= 2025–26 FC Dynamo Kyiv season =

FC Dynamo Kyiv
2025–26 season
- President: Ihor Surkis
- Head coach: Oleksandr Shovkovskyi (until 27 November); Ihor Kostyuk (Acting) (27 November - 17 December); Ihor Kostyuk (from 17 December)
- Stadium: Valeriy Lobanovskyi Stadium (League); Arena Lublin (Europe)
- Premier League: 4th
- Ukrainian Cup: Winners
- UEFA Champions League: Third qualifying round
- UEFA Europa League: Play-off round
- UEFA Conference League: League phase
- Top goalscorer: League: Matviy Ponomarenko (13); All: Matviy Ponomarenko (16)
Home colours	Away colours	Third colours

The 2025–26 season was the 99th season in the history of FC Dynamo Kyiv, and the club's 35th consecutive season in the Ukrainian Premier League. In addition to the domestic league, the club participated in the Ukrainian Cup and the UEFA Conference League after dropping out of the UEFA Champions League and UEFA Europa League.

== Season events ==
On 1 September, Vladyslav Vanat left Dynamo in order to sign for La Liga club Girona, and Dynamo announced the signing of Shola Ogundana from Flamengo, to a four-year contract.

On 2 September, Dynamo announced the signing of Aliou Thiaré from Le Havre to a four-year contract, and the year-long loan signing of Vasyl Burtnyk from Nyva Ternopil.

On 3 September, Dynamo announced the signing of Vladislav Blănuță from U Craiova, to a five-year contract. Shortly after Blănuță's arrival, reports surfaced about controversial social media activity, which the club addressed in an official statement reaffirming the player's pro-Ukrainian stance.

On 27 November, following a 2-0 defeat to AC Omonia in the UEFA Conference League, Dynamo announced that Oleksandr Shovkovskyi and his coaching staff had been relieved of their duties and that Under-19's coach Ihor Kostyuk had been placed in temporary charge.

On 17 December, Dynamo announced the permanent appointment of Ihor Kostyuk as their First-Team Head Coach.

On 7 January, Dynamo announced that they had extended their contract with Denys Popov until the end of 2030.

On 12 January, Dynamo announced that their loan deal with Vasyl Burtnyk had been ended.

On 13 January, Dynamo announced that they had extended their contract with Taras Mykhavko until the end of 2030.

On 17 January, Dynamo announced that Ángel Torres had joined Eyüpspor on loan for the remainder of the season.

On 25 January, Dynamo announced that they had extended their contract with Mykola Shaparenko until the end of 2030.

On 1 February, Dynamo announced that Reshat Ramadani had extended his loan deal with Shkëndija, until the end of the season.

On 5 February, Dynamo announced that they had extended their contract with Bohdan Redushko until 31 December 2030.

On 11 March, Samba Diallo joined Rukh Lviv on loan for the remainder of the season.

On 25 March, Dynamo announced that they had extended their contract with Vladyslav Kabayev until 30 June 2028.

On 29 May, Dynamo announced that they had extended their contract with Andriy Yarmolenko until 30 June 2027.

== Squad ==
As of match played 23 May 2026

Number	Player	Nationality	Position	Date of birth (age)	Signed from	Signed in	Contract ends	Apps.	Goals
Goalkeepers
35	Ruslan Neshcheret	(Ukraine)	GK	22 January 2002 (aged 24)	Academy	2019	2028	81	0
51	Valentyn Morgun	(Ukraine)	GK	10 August 2001 (aged 24)	Academy	2023		6	0
71	Viacheslav Surkis	(Ukraine)	GK	27 February 2006 (aged 20)	Academy	2025		2	0
74	Denys Ignatenko	(Ukraine)	GK	11 January 2003 (aged 23)	Academy	2022	2026	0	0
	Artem Somka	(Ukraine)	GK	29 July 2007 (aged 18)	Academy	2025		0	0
Defenders
2	Kostyantyn Vivcharenko	(Ukraine)	DF	10 June 2002 (aged 23)	Academy	2018	2028	98	4
4	Denys Popov	(Ukraine)	DF	17 February 1999 (aged 27)	Academy	2017	2030	153	14
13	Maksym Korobov	(Ukraine)	DF	6 March 2006 (aged 20)	Academy	2025		11	0
18	Oleksandr Tymchyk	(Ukraine)	DF	20 January 1997 (aged 29)	Academy	2014	2028	121	4
32	Taras Mykhavko	(Ukraine)	DF	30 May 2005 (aged 20)	Lviv	2023	2030	74	5
34	Vladyslav Zakharchenko	(Ukraine)	DF	16 June 2006 (aged 19)	Academy	2025		16	0
40	Kristian Bilovar	(Ukraine)	DF	5 February 2001 (aged 25)	Academy	2021		53	0
44	Vladyslav Dubinchak	(Ukraine)	DF	1 July 1998 (aged 27)	Academy	2016	2028	103	1
66	Aliou Thiaré	(Senegal)	DF	20 December 2003 (aged 22)	Le Havre	2025	2029	15	1
Midfielders
5	Oleksandr Yatsyk	(Ukraine)	MF	3 January 2003 (aged 23)	Academy	2019		23	2
6	Volodymyr Brazhko	(Ukraine)	MF	23 January 2002 (aged 24)	Academy	2019		93	14
7	Andriy Yarmolenko	(Ukraine)	MF	23 October 1989 (aged 36)	Al Ain	2023	2027	420	167
8	Oleksandr Pikhalyonok	(Ukraine)	MF	7 May 1997 (aged 29)	Dnipro-1	2024	2029	69	10
9	Nazar Voloshyn	(Ukraine)	MF	17 June 2003 (aged 22)	Academy	2020	2028	116	18
10	Mykola Shaparenko	(Ukraine)	MF	4 October 1998 (aged 27)	Illichivets Mariupol	2017	2030	235	32
15	Valentyn Rubchynskyi	(Ukraine)	MF	15 February 2002 (aged 24)	Dnipro-1	2024	2028	36	3
16	Shola Ogundana	(Nigeria)	MF	22 February 2005 (aged 21)	Flamengo	2025	2029	23	2
20	Oleksandr Karavayev	(Ukraine)	MF	2 June 1992 (aged 33)	Zorya Luhansk	2019	2026 (+1)	200	16
22	Vladyslav Kabayev	(Ukraine)	MF	1 September 1995 (aged 30)	Zorya Luhansk	2022	2028	117	11
29	Vitaliy Buyalskyi	(Ukraine)	MF	6 January 1993 (aged 33)	Academy	2010	2027	390	86
91	Mykola Mykhaylenko	(Ukraine)	MF	22 May 2001 (aged 25)	Academy	2021		57	3
Forwards
11	Matviy Ponomarenko	(Ukraine)	FW	11 January 2006 (aged 20)	Academy	2022	2028	30	18
19	Vitaliy Lobko	(Ukraine)	FW	11 August 2006 (aged 19)	Academy	2025		1	0
39	Eduardo Guerrero	(Panama)	FW	21 February 2000 (aged 26)	Zorya Luhansk	2024	2029	60	10
70	Bohdan Redushko	(Ukraine)	FW	7 January 2007 (aged 19)	Academy	2025	2030	16	2
77	Vladislav Blănuță	(Romania)	FW	12 January 2002 (aged 24)	U Craiova	2024	2030	10	1
Away on loan
17	Ángel Torres	(Colombia)	MF	6 April 2000 (aged 26)	Unattached	2025	2028	2	0
21	Vladyslav Supryaha	(Ukraine)	FW	15 February 2000 (aged 26)	Dnipro-1	2018		60	3
23	Navin Malysh	(Ukraine)	DF	27 July 2003 (aged 22)	Academy	2023		6	0
25	Maksym Dyachuk	(Ukraine)	DF	21 July 2003 (aged 22)	Academy	2020		48	1
33	Roman Salenko	(Ukraine)	MF	18 May 2005 (aged 21)	Dinaz Vyshhorod	2022		4	0
45	Maksym Braharu	(Ukraine)	MF	21 July 2002 (aged 23)	Unattached	2024	2028	24	1
	Oleksiy Husyev	(Ukraine)	DF	16 March 2005 (aged 21)	Academy	2024		0	0
	Oleksandr Syrota	(Ukraine)	DF	11 June 2000 (aged 25)	Academy	2019		85	2
	Vitinho	(Brazil)	MF	1 April 1999 (aged 27)	Athletico Paranaense	2021	2026	13	3
	Reshat Ramadani	(North Macedonia)	MF	30 June 2003 (aged 22)	Shkëndija	2023		4	0
	Samba Diallo	(Senegal)	MF	5 January 2003 (aged 23)	AF Darou Salam	2021		17	1
	Justin Lonwijk	(Suriname)	MF	21 December 1999 (aged 26)	Viborg FF	2022	2027	24	1
	Anton Tsarenko	(Ukraine)	MF	17 June 2004 (aged 21)	Academy	2022		21	2
	Vikentiy Voloshyn	(Ukraine)	MF	17 April 2001 (aged 25)	Academy	2021		0	0
	Giorgi Tsitaishvili	(Georgia (country))	FW	18 November 2000 (aged 25)	Academy	2018		24	0
	Vladyslav Herych	(Ukraine)	FW	7 November 2005 (aged 20)	Academy	2025		0	0
	Eric Ramírez	(Venezuela)	FW	20 November 1998 (aged 27)	DAC 1904	2021		20	4
Players who left during the season
11	Vladyslav Vanat	(Ukraine)	FW	4 January 2002 (aged 24)	Academy	2021	2027	112	48
14	Vasyl Burtnyk	(Ukraine)	DF	23 July 2002 (aged 23)	on loan from Nyva Ternopil	2025	2026	0	0
	Dmytro Kremchanin	(Ukraine)	MF	22 March 2005 (aged 21)	Academy	2025		0	0

== Transfers ==
=== In ===
Date	Position	Nationality	Name	From	Fee	Ref.
1 September 2025	MF	(Nigeria)	Shola Ogundana	Flamengo	Undisclosed	
2 September 2025	DF	(Senegal)	Aliou Thiaré	Le Havre	Undisclosed	
3 September 2025	FW	(Romania)	Vladislav Blănuță	U Craiova	Undisclosed	

=== Loans in ===
Date from	Position	Nationality	Name	From	Date to	Ref.
2 September 2025	MF	(Ukraine)	Vasyl Burtnyk	Nyva Ternopil	12 January 2026	

=== Out ===
Date	Position	Nationality	Name	To	Fee	Ref.
1 August 2025	MF	(Ukraine)	Davyd Bilyi	Oleksandriya	Undisclosed	
1 September 2025	FW	(Ukraine)	Vladyslav Vanat	Girona	Undisclosed	
5 September 2025	MF	(Ukraine)	Dmytro Kremchanin	Oleksandriya	Undisclosed	

=== Loans out ===
Date from	Position	Nationality	Name	To	Date to	Ref.
11 February 2024	MF	(North Macedonia)	Reshat Ramadani	Shkëndija	30 June 2026	
1 July 2025	MF	(Ukraine)	Navin Malysh	Zorya Luhansk	30 June 2026	
2 July 2025	DF	(Ukraine)	Anton Tsarenko	Lechia Gdańsk	30 June 2026	
11 July 2025	MF	(Georgia (country))	Giorgi Tsitaishvili	Metz	30 June 2026	
17 July 2025	DF	(Ukraine)	Maksym Dyachuk	Lechia Gdańsk	30 June 2026	
21 July 2025	MF	(Ukraine)	Roman Salenko	Zorya Luhansk	30 June 2026	
7 August 2025	MF	(Suriname)	Justin Lonwijk	Fortuna Sittard	30 June 2026	
11 August 2025	DF	(Ukraine)	Oleksiy Husyev	Kudrivka	30 June 2026	
22 August 2025	DF	(Ukraine)	Oleksandr Syrota	Kocaelispor	30 June 2026	
22 August 2025	FW	(Ukraine)	Vladyslav Supryaha	Epitsentr Kamianets-Podilskyi	30 June 2026	
8 September 2025	MF	(Ukraine)	Maksym Braharu	Polissya Zhytomyr	30 June 2026	
8 September 2025	FW	(Ukraine)	Vladyslav Herych	Chornomorets Odesa	30 June 2026	
8 September 2025	FW	(Venezuela)	Eric Ramírez	Bohemians 1905	5 February 2026	
17 January 2026	MF	(Colombia)	Ángel Torres	Eyüpspor	30 June 2026	
5 February 2026	FW	(Venezuela)	Eric Ramírez	Carabobo	30 June 2026	
11 March 2026	MF	(Senegal)	Samba Diallo	Rukh Lviv	30 June 2026	

=== Released ===
Date	Position	Nationality	Name	Joined	Date	Ref.
23 June 2025	MF	(Ukraine)	Valeriy Luchkevych	Epitsentr Kamianets-Podilskyi		

== Friendlies ==
8 September 2025	Dynamo Kyiv	4–0	Lisne
EEST (UTC+3)	Yarmolenko 14', 29'; Vivcharenko 51'; Pikhalyonok 60'	Report

20 January 2026	Korona Kielce	0–0	Dynamo Kyiv	Antalya, Turkey
16:00 EEST (UTC+3)		Report		Stadium: Fanatic Tour Topkapi Football Center

25 January 2026	Dynamo Kyiv	8–1	Malisheva	Antalya, Turkey
16:00 EEST (UTC+3)	Kabayev 10', 41'; Ogundana 46'; Buyalskyi 72'; Herych 80'; Guerrero 107'; Osypenko 110'; Pikhalyonok 120' (pen.)	Report	Ibishi 4'	Stadium: Fanatic Tour Lara Sports Center
Note: Match consisted of four 30minute halfs.

30 January 2026	Dynamo Kyiv	0–1	Kauno Žalgiris	Antalya, Turkey
12:00 EEST (UTC+3)		Report	Černych 88'	Stadium: Fanatic Tour Lara Sports Center

5 February 2026	Dynamo Kyiv	3–2	Veres Rivne	Turkey
EEST (UTC+3)	Shaparenko 22', 38'; Brazhko 67'	Report	Kharatin 40'; Sharay 46'

9 February 2026	Dynamo Kyiv	2–1	Kudrivka	Turkey
11:30 EEST (UTC+3)	Mykhaylenko 56'; Diallo 72'	Report	Morozko 4'

9 February 2026	Dynamo Kyiv	2–0	Iberia 1999	Belek, Turkey
EEST (UTC+3)	Popov (red card) 44'; Brazhko 58'; Ponomarenko 67'	Report		Stadium: Sueno Sport Center

14 February 2026	Dynamo Kyiv	5–3	Zimbru Chișinău	Belek, Turkey
11:00 EEST (UTC+3)	Buyalskyi 8', 60'; Yarmolenko 23'; Mykhaylenko 47'; Zakharchenko (yellow card) 49'; Guerrero 84' (pen.)	Report	Kazlouski 2'; Dosso 25'; Vasilevich 52'; Boyko (yellow card) 67'; Thiago { (yellow card) 72'; Jonatas (yellow card) 83'	Stadium: Sueno Sport Center

14 February 2026	Dynamo Kyiv	2–0	RFS	Belek, Turkey
EEST (UTC+3)	Brazhko 61'; Korobov (yellow card) 78'; Ponomarenko 86' (pen.)	Report		Stadium: Sueno Sport Center

== Competitions ==
=== Overall record ===
Competition	First match	Last match	Starting round	Final position	Record							
Competition	First match	Last match	Starting round	Final position	Pld	W	D	L	GF	GA	GD	Win %
Premier League	2 August 2025	24 May 2026	Matchday 1	4th	30	17	6	7	66	36	+30	56.67
Ukrainian Cup	17 September 2025	20 May 2026	Round of 32	Winners	5	5	0	0	12	3	+9	100.00
Champions League	22 July 2025	12 August 2025	Second qualifying round	Third qualifying round	4	2	0	2	6	3	+3	50.00
Europa League	21 August 2025	28 August 2025	Play-off round	Play-off round	2	1	0	1	2	3	−1	50.00
Conference League	2 October 2025	18 December 2025	League phase	27th	6	2	0	4	9	9	+0	33.33
Total					47	27	6	14	95	54	+41	57.45

Last updated: 24 May 2026
Source: Results

=== Premier League ===
==== League table ====
Pos	Team	Pld	W	D	L	GF	GA	GD	Pts	Qualification or relegation
2	LNZ Cherkasy	30	18	6	6	39	17	+22	60	Qualification for the Conference League second qualifying round
3	Polissya Zhytomyr	30	18	5	7	51	21	+30	59	Qualification for the Conference League second qualifying round
4	Dynamo Kyiv (Note: Dynamo Kyiv is the winner of the 2025–26 Ukrainian Cup)	30	17	6	7	66	36	+30	57	Qualification for the Europa League first qualifying round
5	Metalist 1925 Kharkiv	30	13	12	5	36	19	+17	51	
6	Kolos Kovalivka	30	13	10	7	30	25	+5	49	

Updated to match(es) played on 24 May 2026. Source: upl.ua
Rules for classification: 1) Points; 2) Head-to-head points; 3) Head-to-head goal difference; 4) Head-to-head goals scored; 5) Goal difference; 6) Goals scored; 7) Draw or "Golden match" if two teams tied for title (Article 22, paragraph 3).
Notes:

Teams that placed 13th and 14th in the 2025–26 Ukrainian Premier League play a two-leg play-off with the third and fourth teams of the 2025–26 Ukrainian First League.

The withdrawn 14th-placed Rukh Lviv (Note: The participation of FC Rukh in the relegation playoffs is to be confirmed, since the owner announced that the club may not participate in that stage.) was replaced with the 15th-placed FC Oleksandriya.

This round includes 2 clubs from the Premier League: FC Oleksandriya and Kudrivka; 2 clubs from the First League: Livyi Bereh Kyiv and Ahrobiznes Volochysk.

Premier League teams	Agg.	First League teams	1st leg	2nd leg
FC Oleksandriya	1–2	Livyi Bereh Kyiv	1–1	0–1
Kudrivka	2–2 (3–2 p)	Ahrobiznes Volochysk	0–0	2–2

=== First Semi-final ===
5 June 2025
15:30

FC Oleksandriya	1–1	Livyi Bereh Kyiv
Yade 21'	Report	Voloshyn 51'

CSC Nika, Oleksandriya
Attendance: 1170
Referee: Oleksiy Derevinskyi (Khmelnytskyi)

9 June 2026
15:30

Livyi Bereh Kyiv	1–0	FC Oleksandriya
Banada 45'	Report

Arena Livyi Bereh, Kyiv
Attendance: 1285
Referee: Dmytro Panchyshyn (Kharkiv)

Livyi Bereh Kyiv won 2–1 on aggregate and promotion to Premier League.

==== Second Semi-final ====
5 June 2026
18:00

Kudrivka	0–0	Ahrobiznes Volochysk
	Report

Avanhard, Rivne
Attendance: 75
Referee: Vitaliy Romanov (Dnipro)

9 June 2026
18:00

Ahrobiznes Volochysk	2–2	Kudrivka
B. Kozak 70'; Tolochko 90+1' (p)	Report	Machelyuk 39'; Lyehostayev 81'
Penalties
Havrushko (penalty missed); B.Kozak (penalty scored); Riznyk (penalty missed); Nyzhnyk (penalty scored); Tolochko (penalty missed)	2–3	(penalty missed) Veklyak; (penalty scored) Dumanyuk; (penalty scored) Machelyuk; (penalty missed) Hlushchenko; (penalty scored) Lyehostayev

Ternopilskyi miskyi imeni Shukhevycha, Ternopil
Attendance: 2500
Referee: Oleksandr Shandor (Lviv)

2–2 on aggregate; Kudrivka won 3–2 on penalties

==== Results summary ====
Overall								Home						Away					
Pld	W	D	L	GF	GA	GD	Pts	W	D	L	GF	GA	GD	W	D	L	GF	GA	GD
30	17	6	7	66	35	+31	57	9	2	4	31	14	+17	8	4	3	35	21	+14

Last updated: 24 May 2026.
Source: Results

==== Results by round ====
Round	1	2	3	4	5	6	7	8	9	10	11	12	13	14	15	16	17	18	19	20	21	22	23	24	25	26	27	28	29	30
Ground	A	A	A	H	A	H	A	H	A	H	A	H	A	H	A	H	H	H	A	H	A	H	A	H	A	H	A	H	A	H
Result	W	W	W	W	D	D	D	D	D	W	L	L	L	L	W	W	W	W	W	W	W	L	L	W	W	L	D	W	W	W
Position	5	1	1	1	1	1	2	2	3	2	2	4	6	7	6	4	4	4	4	4	4	4	5	5	4	4	4	4	4	4

Updated to match(es) played on 24 May 2026. Source: Results
A = Away; H = Home; W = Win; D = Draw; L = Loss

==== Results ====
2 August 2025 1	Veres Rivne	0–1	Dynamo Kyiv	Rivne
15:30 EEST (UTC+3)	Honcharenko (yellow card) 27'	Report	Shaparenko 14'	Stadium: Avanhard Stadium; Attendance: 5,154; Referee: Oleksii Derevinskyi

8 August 2025 2	Rukh Lviv	1–5	Dynamo Kyiv	Lviv
18:00 EEST (UTC+3)	Faal 88'	Report	Mykhavko 21'; Kholod 47' (o.g.); Buyalskyi 65'; Braharu 77'; Yatsyk 80'	Stadium: Ukraina Stadium; Attendance: 1,850; Referee: Vitalii Romanov

16 August 2025 3	Epitsentr Kamianets-Podilskyi	1–4	Dynamo Kyiv	Ternopil
18:00 EEST (UTC+3)	Klymets 38'; Myronyuk (yellow card) 90+1'	Report	Guerrero 8'; Mykhaylenko 45+3'; Voloshyn 57'; Vanat 90+3'	Stadium: City Stadium; Attendance: 7,820; Referee: Oleksandr Afanasiev

31 August 2025 4	Dynamo Kyiv	4–1	Polissya Zhytomyr	Kyiv
15:30 EEST (UTC+3)	Guerrero 19'; Buyalskyi 32' (pen.), 44'; Voloshyn 50'; Bilovar (yellow card) 73'	Report	Andriyevskyi (yellow card) 2'; Yosefi 7'; Babenko (yellow card) 59'; Talles (yellow card) 89'; Beskorovaynyi (yellow card) 89'	Stadium: Valeriy Lobanovskyi Dynamo Stadium; Attendance: 1,797; Referee: Vitalii Romanov

13 September 2025 5	Obolon Kyiv	2–2	Dynamo Kyiv	Kyiv
15:30 EEST (UTC+3)	Nesterenko 40'; Ustymenko 90+1' (yellow card) 90+1'	Report	Brazhko (yellow card) 8'; Karavayev 25'; Mykhavko 44'	Stadium: Obolon Arena; Attendance: 4,250; Referee: Denys Shurman

22 September 2025 6	Dynamo Kyiv	2–2	Oleksandriya	Kyiv
15:30 EEST (UTC+3)	Brazhko 40'; Pikhalyonok 63' (pen.); Voloshyn (yellow card) 83'	Report	Buletsa 1'; Silva (yellow card) 76' (yellow-red card) 90+3'; Touati 86'	Stadium: Valeriy Lobanovskyi Dynamo Stadium; Attendance: 1,459; Referee: Maksym Kozyriatskyi

27 September 2025 7	Karpaty Lviv	3–3	Dynamo Kyiv	Lviv
18:00 EEST (UTC+3)	Álvarez 24'; Bruninho 27'; Kostenko (yellow card) 72'; Miroshnichenko 90+3'	Report	Karavayev 43', 52'; Shaparenko 50'	Stadium: Ukraina Stadium; Attendance: 8,700; Referee: Vitalii Romanov

5 October 2025 8	Dynamo Kyiv	1–1	Metalist 1925 Kharkiv	Kyiv
15:30 EEST (UTC+3)	Voloshyn 35'; Ogundana (yellow card) 41'; Zakharchenko (yellow card) 84'	Report	Lytvynenko 58'	Stadium: Valeriy Lobanovskyi Dynamo Stadium; Attendance: 1,794; Referee: Viktor Kopievskii

18 October 2025 9	Zorya Luhansk	1–1	Dynamo Kyiv	Kyiv
15:30 EEST (UTC+3)	Juninho (yellow card) 43'; Kushnirenko (yellow card) 53'; Budkivskyi 84'	Report	Voloshyn (yellow card) 54'; Buyalskyi 61'; Mykhaylenko (yellow card) 87'	Stadium: Valeriy Lobanovskyi Dynamo Stadium; Attendance: 1,950; Referee: Oleksandr Shandor

26 October 2025 10	Dynamo Kyiv	4–0	Kryvbas Kryvyi Rih	Kyiv
18:00 EET (UTC+2)	Popov 15'; Karavayev 25'; Yarmolenko 33' (yellow card) 50'; Kabayev (yellow card) 40'; Guerrero 90+1'	Report	Araujo (yellow card) 59'; Vilivald (yellow card) 72'	Stadium: Valeriy Lobanovskyi Dynamo Stadium; Attendance: 3,460; Referee: Mykola Balakin

2 November 2025 11	Shakhtar Donetsk	3–1	Dynamo Kyiv	Lviv
18:00 EET (UTC+2)	Eguinaldo 3'; Marlon (yellow card) 13'; Newerton 54' (yellow card) 55'; Kabayev 90+4' (o.g.)	Report	Thiaré (yellow card) 40'; Buyalskyi 56'	Stadium: Arena Lviv; Attendance: 4,200; Referee: Vitalii Romanov

9 November 2025 12	Dynamo Kyiv	0–1	LNZ Cherkasy	Kyiv
15:30 EET (UTC+2)	Kabayev (yellow card) 69'; Popov (yellow card) 75'; Mykhavko (yellow card) 90+1'	Report	Pastukh 45+1'; Nonikashvili (yellow card) 72'	Stadium: Valeriy Lobanovskyi Dynamo Stadium; Attendance: 1,950; Referee: Mykola Balakin

22 November 2025 13	Kolos Kovalivka	2–1	Dynamo Kyiv	Kovalivka
18:00 EET (UTC+2)	Klymchuk 8', 37'; Pakholyuk (yellow card) 71'; Salabay (yellow card) 90'; Alefirenko (yellow card) 90+3'	Report	Kabayev (yellow card) 18'; Dubinchak (yellow card) 39'; Popov (yellow card) 73'; Ogundana 86'	Stadium: Kolos Stadium; Attendance: 2,714; Referee: Andrii Kovalenko

1 December 2025 14	Dynamo Kyiv	1–2	Poltava	Kyiv
15:30 EET (UTC+2)	Yatsyk 79'	Report	Odaryuk 45+1'; Plakhtyr (yellow card) 57'; Misyura 74'	Stadium: Valeriy Lobanovskyi Dynamo Stadium; Attendance: 582; Referee: Oleksii Derevinskyi

6 December 2025 15	Kudrivka	1–2	Dynamo Kyiv	Kyiv
18:00 EET (UTC+2)	Mamrosenko (yellow card) 58'; Rohozynskyi (yellow card) 63'; Nahnoynyi 66'; Serdyuk (yellow card) 74'	Report	Pikhalyonok 10'; Ponomarenko 38'; Vivcharenko (yellow card) 48'; Thiaré (yellow card) 90+2'	Stadium: Obolon Arena; Referee: Oleksandr Omelchenko

14 December 2025 16	Dynamo Kyiv	3–0	Veres Rivne	Kyiv
15:30 EET (UTC+2)	Ponomarenko 9'; Thiaré 20'; Yarmolenko 90+1'	Report	Kharatin (yellow card) 53'	Stadium: Valeriy Lobanovskyi Dynamo Stadium; Attendance: 1,120; Referee: Dmytro Panchyshyn

20 February 2026 17	Dynamo Kyiv	1–0	Rukh Lviv	Kyiv
18:00 EET (UTC+2)	Vivcharenko (yellow card) 43'; Pikhalyonok (yellow card) 66'; Ponomarenko 75'	Report	Kitela (yellow card) 40'; Roman (yellow card) 43'; Neves (yellow card) 63'; Talles (yellow card) 90+3'; Pidhurskyi (yellow card) 90+3'	Stadium: Valeriy Lobanovskyi Dynamo Stadium; Attendance: 856; Referee: Dmytro Panchyshyn

27 February 2026 18	Dynamo Kyiv	4–0	Epitsentr Kamianets-Podilskyi	Kyiv
13:00 EET (UTC+2)	Brazhko 36' (pen.); Ponomarenko 49', 53'; Yarmolenko 65'	Report		Stadium: Valeriy Lobanovskyi Dynamo Stadium; Attendance: 814; Referee: Roman Blavatskyi

8 March 2026 19	Polissya Zhytomyr	1–2	Dynamo Kyiv	Zhytomyr
18:00 EET (UTC+2)	Hutsulyak 40' (pen.)	Report	Ponomarenko (yellow card) 45' (goal) 45+2', 60'	Stadium: Tsentralnyi Stadion; Attendance: 5,050; Referee: Mykola Balakin

13 March 2026 20	Dynamo Kyiv	2–1	Obolon Kyiv	Kyiv
18:00 EET (UTC+2)	Yarmolenko 31'; Ponomarenko 40'	Report	Ustymenko 20'; Shevchenko (yellow card) 78'; Feshchenko (yellow card) 90+4'	Stadium: Valeriy Lobanovskyi Dynamo Stadium; Attendance: 2,065; Referee: Oleksandr Afanasiev

19 March 2026 21	Oleksandriya	0–5	Dynamo Kyiv	Oleksandriia
13:00 EET (UTC+2)	Shostak (yellow card) 37'; Behiratche (yellow card) 43'	Report	Yarmolenko 3'; Yatsyk 20'; Zakharchenko (yellow card) 47'; Voloshyn 68'; Redushko 72'; Ponomarenko 83'	Stadium: CSC Nika Stadium; Attendance: 1,146; Referee: Oleksandr Shandor

4 April 2026 22	Dynamo Kyiv	0–1	Karpaty Lviv	Kyiv
18:00 EET (UTC+2)	Brazhko (yellow card) 26'; Ponomarenko (yellow card) 84' (yellow-red card) 90+4'	Report	Faal 5'; Miroshnichenko (yellow card) 28'; Bruninho (yellow card) 74'; Lyakh (yellow card) 90+4'; Baboglo (yellow card) 90+4'; Kholod (yellow card) 90+4'; Domchak (yellow card) 90+8'	Stadium: Valeriy Lobanovskyi Dynamo Stadium; Attendance: 4,300; Referee: Dmytro Panchyshyn

11 April 2026 23	Metalist 1925 Kharkiv	1–0	Dynamo Kyiv	Zhytomyr
15:30 EET (UTC+2)	Antyukh 77'; Varakuta (yellow card) 90+5'	Report	Voloshyn (yellow card) 47'	Stadium: Tsentralnyi Stadion; Referee: Roman Blavatskyi

17 April 2026 24	Dynamo Kyiv	3–1	Zorya Luhansk	Kyiv
15:30 EET (UTC+2)	Ponomarenko 19'; Dubinchak (yellow card) 54'; Brazhko 63' (pen.); Redushko 68'; Buyalskyi (yellow card) 76'	Report	Budkivskyi 9' (pen.); Jordan (yellow card) 19'; Kushnirenko (yellow card) 35'	Stadium: Valeriy Lobanovskyi Dynamo Stadium; Attendance: 1,597; Referee: Maksym Kozyriatskyi

26 April 2026 25	Kryvbas Kryvyi Rih	5–6	Dynamo Kyiv	Kryvyi Rih
13:00 EET (UTC+2)	Mendoza 13', 29', 34', 45+2'; Araujo (yellow card) 53'; Zaderaka 73'	Report	Ponomarenko 15'; Zakharchenko (yellow card) 25'; Mykhavko 48'; Voloshyn (yellow card) 56' (goal) 63'; Buyalskyi 68'; Yarmolenko 75', 88'	Stadium: Hirnyk Stadium; Attendance: 2,400; Referee: Oleksandr Shandor

3 May 2026 26	Dynamo Kyiv	1–2	Shakhtar Donetsk	Kyiv
18:00 EET (UTC+2)	Ponomarenko 13' (yellow card) 90'; Bilovar (yellow card) 46'	Report	Tobias (yellow card) 32'; Matviyenko (yellow card) 34'; Ferreira 50'; Traoré 69'	Stadium: Valeriy Lobanovskyi Dynamo Stadium; Attendance: 7,900; Referee: Oleksandr Afanasiev

9 May 2026 27	LNZ Cherkasy	0–0	Dynamo Kyiv	Cherkasy
15:30 EET (UTC+2)	Horin (yellow card) 61'; Drambayev (yellow card) 79'; Assinor (yellow card) 80'	Report		Stadium: Cherkasy Arena; Attendance: 9,200; Referee: Vitalii Romanov

13 May 2026 28	Dynamo Kyiv	2–1	Kolos Kovalivka	Kyiv
15:30 EET (UTC+2)	Mykhavko 8'; Yarmolenko 13' (pen.); Buyalskyi (yellow card) 45+1'; Zakharchenko (yellow card) 54'	Report	Burda (yellow card) 13'; Salabay 58'; Demchenko (yellow card) 79'	Stadium: Valeriy Lobanovskyi Dynamo Stadium; Attendance: 1,128; Referee: Andrii Kovalenko

16 May 2026 29	Poltava	0–2	Dynamo Kyiv	Kyiv
13:00 EET (UTC+2)	Misyura (yellow card) 23'; Danylenko (yellow card) 66'	Report	Yarmolenko 3' (pen.); Thiaré (yellow card) 15'; Guerrero 90+1'	Stadium: Valeriy Lobanovskyi Dynamo Stadium; Attendance: 1,009; Referee: Mykhailo Raida

24 May 2026 30	Dynamo Kyiv	3–2	Kudrivka	Kyiv
13:00 EET (UTC+2)	Ponomarenko (yellow card) 10' (goal) 61'; Mykhavko 21'; Guerrero 82'; Buyalskyi (yellow card) 87'	Report	Potimkov (yellow card) 10'; Storchous 36', 45'	Stadium: Valeriy Lobanovskyi Dynamo Stadium; Attendance: 2,515; Referee: Roman Blavatskyi

=== Ukrainian Cup ===
17 September 2025 Round of 32	Oleksandriya	1–2	Dynamo Kyiv	Oleksandriia
17:00 EEST (UTC+3)	Behiratche (yellow card) 19'; Kulakov (yellow card) 36'; Buletsa 58'	Report	Pikhalyonok 22'; Dubinchak (yellow card) 72'; Ogundana 85'	Stadium: CSC Nika Stadium; Attendance: 1,180; Referee: Oleksandr Omelchenko

29 October 2025 Round of 16	Dynamo Kyiv	2–1	Shakhtar Donetsk	Kyiv
18:00 EET (UTC+2)	Popov (yellow card) 17'; Yarmolenko 72'; Guerrero 79' (yellow card) 79'	Report	Meirelles 49'; Konoplya (yellow card) 83'	Stadium: Valeriy Lobanovskyi Dynamo Stadium; Attendance: 4,333; Referee: Dmytro Panchyshyn

3 March 2026 Quarter-final	Dynamo Kyiv	2–0	Inhulets Petrove	Kyiv
18:00 EET (UTC+2)	Guerrero 50'; Popov (yellow card) 51'; Pikhalyonok 84'	Report	Benedyuk (yellow card) 67'	Stadium: Valeriy Lobanovskyi Dynamo Stadium; Attendance: 1,125; Referee: Oleksandr Shandor

21 April 2026 Semi-final	Bukovyna Chernivtsi	0–3	Dynamo Kyiv	Ternopil
18:00 EET (UTC+2)	Voytikhovskyi (yellow card) 88'	Report	Redushko (yellow card) 9'; Ponomarenko 23', 82'; Brazhko (yellow card) 29'; Voloshyn 43'; Shaparenko (yellow card) 54'; Dubinchak (yellow card) 88'	Stadium: City Stadium; Attendance: 14,500; Referee: Oleksandr Afanasiev

20 May 2026 Final	Chernihiv	1–3	Dynamo Kyiv	Lviv
18:00 EEST (UTC+3)	Kartushov (yellow card) 23'; Romanchenko 34'; Halstyan (yellow card) 60'; Koydan (yellow card) 84'	Report	Buyalskyi 26', 53'; Yarmolenko 70'	Stadium: Arena Lviv; Attendance: 4,889; Referee: Oleksandr Shandor

=== UEFA Champions League ===
==== Qualifying phase ====
22 July 2025 Second qualifying round 1st leg	Hamrun Spartans (Malta)	0–3	(Ukraine) Dynamo Kyiv	Paola, Malta
20:00 EEST (UTC+3)	Bjeličić (yellow card) 45+1'; Šimkus (yellow card) 50'; Eder (yellow card) 70'	Report	Vanat 13' (yellow card) 74'; Yarmolenko (yellow card) 55'; Popov (yellow card) 55'; Buyalskyi 76'; Voloshyn 90+2'	Stadium: Tony Bezzina Stadium; Attendance: 1,760; Referee: César Soto Grado (Spain)
Note: Hamrun Spartans played their Champions League second qualifying round home match at the Tony Bezzina Stadium, in Paola, instead of their regular venue, the Victor Tedesco Stadium, in Hamrun, which did not meet UEFA requirements.

29 July 2025 Second qualifying round 2nd leg	Dynamo Kyiv (Ukraine)	3–0 (6–0 agg.)	(Malta) Hamrun Spartans	Lublin, Poland
20:00 EEST (UTC+3)	Vanat 28'; Brazhko 35'; Vivcharenko (yellow card) 69'; Mykhavko 82'; Tymchyk (yellow card) 85'	Report	Polito (yellow card) 86'	Stadium: Arena Lublin; Attendance: 2,035; Referee: Jakob Alexander Sundberg (Denmark)
Note: Due to the Russian invasion of Ukraine, Ukrainian teams were required to play their home matches at neutral venues until further notice.

5 August 2025 Third qualifying round 1st leg	Dynamo Kyiv (Ukraine)	0–1	(Cyprus) Pafos	Lublin, Poland
22:00 EEST (UTC+3)	Mykhaylenko (yellow card) 16'; Shaparenko (yellow card) 90+9'	Report	Tanković (yellow card) 29'; Anderson 84'; Pêpê (yellow card) 90+4'; Šunjić (yellow card) 90+9'	Stadium: Arena Lublin; Attendance: 2,020; Referee: Sandro Schärer (Switzerland)
Note: Due to the Russian invasion of Ukraine, Ukrainian teams are required to play their home matches at neutral venues until further notice.

12 August 2025 Third qualifying round 2nd leg	Pafos (Cyprus)	2–0 (3–0 agg.)	(Ukraine) Dynamo Kyiv	Limassol, Cyprus
20:00 EEST (UTC+3)	Oršić 2'; Correia 55'; Quina (yellow card) 90+4'	Report	Vanat (yellow card) 40'	Stadium: Alphamega Stadium; Attendance: 7,601; Referee: Davide Massa (Italy)
Note: Match played at the Alphamega Stadium in Limassol, instead of Pafos' regular Stelios Kyriakides Stadium in Paphos, which did not meet UEFA requirements.

=== UEFA Europa League ===
==== Qualifying phase ====
21 August 2025 Playoff round 1st leg	Maccabi Tel Aviv (Israel)	3–1	(Ukraine) Dynamo Kyiv	Bačka Topola, Serbia
21:00 EEST (UTC+3)	Peretz 12', 69'; Yehezkel 58'; Belić (yellow card) 62'	Report	Voloshyn (yellow card) 25' (goal) 32'; Vivcharenko (red card) 50'; Shaparenko (yellow card) 89'; Mykhavko (yellow card) 90+1'; Mykhaylenko (yellow card) 90+6'	Stadium: TSC Arena; Attendance: 115; Referee: Giorgi Kruashvili (Georgia)
Note: Due to the Gaza war, Israeli teams were required to play their home matches at neutral venues until further notice.

28 August 2025 Playoff round 2nd leg	Dynamo Kyiv (Ukraine)	1–0 (2–3 agg.)	(Israel) Maccabi Tel Aviv	Lublin, Poland
21:00 EEST (UTC+3)	Guerrero 5'; Yarmolenko (yellow card) 33'; Mykhaylenko (yellow card) 90+7'	Report	Sissokho (yellow card) 25'; Belić (yellow card) 58'	Stadium: Arena Lublin; Attendance: 1,537; Referee: Nikola Dabanović (Montenegro)
Note: Due to the Russian invasion of Ukraine, Ukrainian teams were required to play their home matches at neutral venues until further notice.

=== UEFA Conference League ===
==== League Phase ====
Pos	Team	Pld	W	D	L	GF	GA	GD	Pts
25	(Romanian Football Federation) Universitatea Craiova	6	2	1	3	6	8	−2	7
26	(Gibraltar Football Association) Lincoln Red Imps	6	2	1	3	7	15	−8	7
27	(Ukrainian Association of Football) Dynamo Kyiv	6	2	0	4	9	9	0	6
28	(Polish Football Association) Legia Warsaw	6	2	0	4	8	8	0	6
29	(Slovak Football Association) Slovan Bratislava	6	2	0	4	5	9	−4	6

Source: UEFA
Rules for classification: League phase tiebreakers

2 October 2025 1	Dynamo Kyiv (Ukraine)	0–2	(England) Crystal Palace	Lublin, Poland
19:45 EEST (UTC+3)	Thiaré (yellow card) 33'	Report	Muñoz 31'; Hughes (yellow card) 38'; Nketiah 58'; Sosa (yellow card) 74' (yellow-red card) 76'	Stadium: Arena Lublin; Attendance: 6,839; Referee: Lothar D'Hondt (Belgium)
Note: Due to the Russian invasion of Ukraine, Ukrainian teams were required to play their home matches at neutral venues until further notice.

23 October 2025 2	Samsunspor (Turkey)	3–0	(Ukraine) Dynamo Kyiv	Samsun, Turkey
22:00 EET (UTC+2)	Musaba 2'; Mouandilmadji 34'; Holse 62'	Report	Vivcharenko (yellow card) 45+4'; Mykhavko (yellow card) 72'	Stadium: Samsun 19 Mayıs Stadium; Attendance: 13,580; Referee: Ívar Orri Kristjánsson (Iceland)

6 November 2025 3	Dynamo Kyiv (Ukraine)	6–0	(Bosnia and Herzegovina) Zrinjski Mostar	Lublin, Poland
22:00 EET (UTC+2)	Popov 21'; Guerrero 56'; Kabaiev 59'; Buyalskiy 67'; Yarmolenko 78'; Blanuta 83'	Report	Đurasek (yellow card) 45'	Stadium: Arena Lublin; Attendance: 1,576; Referee: Marc Nagtegaal (Netherlands)
Note: Due to the Russian invasion of Ukraine, Ukrainian teams were required to play their home matches at neutral venues until further notice.

27 November 2025 4	Omonia (Cyprus)	2–0	(Ukraine) Dynamo Kyiv	Nicosia, Cyprus
19:45 EET (UTC+2)	Marić (yellow card) 4'; Semedo 34' (pen.); Neophytou 59'; Uzoho (yellow card) 75'	Report	Popov (yellow card) 33'; Mykhaylenko (yellow card) 45+1'; Kabayev (yellow card) 45+2'; Thiaré (yellow card) 57'; Guerrero (yellow card) 79'	Stadium: GSP Stadium; Attendance: 8,979; Referee: Radoslav Gidzhenov (Bulgaria)

11 December 2025 5	Fiorentina (Italy)	2–1	(Ukraine) Dynamo Kyiv	Florence, Italy
19:45 EET (UTC+2)	Kean 18'; Ndour (yellow card) 44'; Guðmundsson 74' (yellow card) 83'; Kouadio (yellow card) 90+3'	Report	Dubinchak (yellow card) 52'; Mykhaylenko 55'; Thiaré (yellow card) 86'; Vivcharenko (yellow card) 90'	Stadium: Stadio Artemio Franchi; Attendance: 8,750; Referee: Miloš Milanović (Serbia)

18 December 2025 6	Dynamo Kyiv (Ukraine)	2–0	(Armenia) Noah	Lublin, Poland
22:00 EET (UTC+2)	Kabayev 27' (yellow card) 52'; Ponomarenko 50' (yellow card) 67'; Mykhavko (yellow card) 54'	Report	Jakoliš (yellow card) 45+1'; Muradyan (yellow card) 70'	Stadium: Arena Lublin; Attendance: 640; Referee: Juxhin Xhaja (Albania)
Note: Due to the Russian invasion of Ukraine, Ukrainian teams were required to play their home matches at neutral venues until further notice.

== Squad statistics ==
As of match played 23 May 2026

=== Appearances and goals ===
No.	Pos	Nat	Player	Total		Premier League		Ukrainian Cup		UEFA Champions League		UEFA Europa League		UEFA Conference League	
No.	Pos	Nat	Player	Apps	Goals	Apps	Goals	Apps	Goals	Apps	Goals	Apps	Goals	Apps	Goals
2	DF	(Ukraine) UKR	Kostyantyn Vivcharenko	29	0	18+2	0	4	0	1+1	0	1	0	1+1	0
4	DF	(Ukraine) UKR	Denys Popov	22	2	10+2	1	2	0	3	0	0+2	0	3	1
5	MF	(Ukraine) UKR	Oleksandr Yatsyk	27	3	10+7	3	1+1	0	0+2	0	0+1	0	1+4	0
6	MF	(Ukraine) UKR	Volodymyr Brazhko	36	4	17+7	3	3+2	0	3	1	0+2	0	1+1	0
7	MF	(Ukraine) UKR	Andriy Yarmolenko	35	12	13+9	9	2+2	2	3	0	2	0	1+3	1
8	MF	(Ukraine) UKR	Oleksandr Pikhalyonok	45	4	20+9	2	2+3	2	3	0	2	0	4+2	0
9	MF	(Ukraine) UKR	Nazar Voloshyn	43	8	21+6	5	3+1	1	1+3	1	2	1	4+2	0
10	MF	(Ukraine) UKR	Mykola Shaparenko	41	2	18+10	2	3	0	3+1	0	1+1	0	3+1	0
11	FW	(Ukraine) UKR	Matviy Ponomarenko	23	16	12+3	13	2	2	0+3	0	0+1	0	1+1	1
13	DF	(Ukraine) UKR	Maksym Korobov	11	0	10+1	0	0	0	0	0	0	0	0	0
15	MF	(Ukraine) UKR	Valentyn Rubchynskyi	5	0	1+1	0	0	0	0	0	0	0	2+1	0
16	MF	(Nigeria) NGA	Shola Ogundana	24	2	9+6	1	3+1	1	0	0	0	0	3+2	0
18	DF	(Ukraine) UKR	Oleksandr Tymchyk	20	0	5+5	0	1+1	0	3+1	0	0	0	4	0
19	FW	(Ukraine) UKR	Vitaliy Lobko	1	0	1	0	0	0	0	0	0	0	0	0
20	MF	(Ukraine) UKR	Oleksandr Karavayev	33	4	16+6	4	3+1	0	1	0	2	0	2+2	0
22	FW	(Ukraine) UKR	Vladyslav Kabayev	25	2	9+4	0	2	0	3+1	0	0+2	0	4	2
29	MF	(Ukraine) UKR	Vitaliy Buyalskyi	37	10	13+12	6	4+1	2	2+1	1	1	0	2+1	1
32	DF	(Ukraine) UKR	Taras Mykhavko	39	6	21+4	5	3	0	4	1	2	0	4+1	0
34	DF	(Ukraine) UKR	Vladyslav Zakharchenko	16	0	5+5	0	2+2	0	0	0	0	0	2	0
35	GK	(Ukraine) UKR	Ruslan Neshcheret	43	0	27	0	4	0	4	0	2	0	6	0
39	FW	(Panama) PAN	Eduardo Guerrero	34	9	12+11	5	1+2	2	0+1	0	1+1	1	4+1	1
40	DF	(Ukraine) UKR	Kristian Bilovar	26	0	16+2	0	3	0	1+1	0	2	0	1	0
44	DF	(Ukraine) UKR	Vladyslav Dubinchak	24	0	10+4	0	1+1	0	3	0	1	0	3+1	0
51	GK	(Ukraine) UKR	Valentyn Morgun	3	0	2	0	1	0	0	0	0	0	0	0
66	DF	(Senegal) SEN	Aliou Thiaré	16	1	9	1	1+1	0	0	0	0	0	5	0
70	FW	(Ukraine) UKR	Bohdan Redushko	16	2	8+5	2	1+1	0	0	0	0	0	0+1	0
71	GK	(Ukraine) UKR	Viacheslav Surkis	2	0	1+1	0	0	0	0	0	0	0	0	0
77	FW	(Romania) ROU	Vladislav Blănuță	11	1	1+6	0	1	0	0	0	0	0	0+3	1
91	MF	(Ukraine) UKR	Mykola Mykhaylenko	35	2	14+9	1	2+1	0	2	0	2	0	5	1
Players away on loan:
17	FW	(Colombia) COL	Ángel Torres	2	0	0+1	0	0	0	0	0	0	0	0+1	0
21	FW	(Ukraine) UKR	Vladyslav Supryaha	1	0	0	0	0	0	0+1	0	0	0	0	0
45	MF	(Ukraine) UKR	Maksym Braharu	3	1	1+1	1	0	0	0+1	0	0	0	0	0
Players who left Dynamo Kyiv during the season:
11	FW	(Ukraine) UKR	Vladyslav Vanat	7	3	1+1	1	0	0	4	2	1	0	0	0

=== Goalscorers ===
Place	Position	Nation	Number	Name	Premier League	Ukrainian Cup	Champions League	Europa League	Conference League	Total
1	FW	(Ukraine)	11	Matviy Ponomarenko	13	2	0	0	1	16
2	MF	(Ukraine)	7	Andriy Yarmolenko	9	2	0	0	1	12
3	MF	(Ukraine)	29	Vitaliy Buyalskyi	6	2	1	0	1	10
4	FW	(Panama)	39	Eduardo Guerrero	5	2	0	1	1	9
5	MF	(Ukraine)	9	Nazar Voloshyn	5	1	1	1	0	8
6	DF	(Ukraine)	32	Taras Mykhavko	5	0	1	0	0	6
7	MF	(Ukraine)	20	Oleksandr Karavayev	4	0	0	0	0	4
7	MF	(Ukraine)	6	Volodymyr Brazhko	3	0	1	0	0	4
7	MF	(Ukraine)	8	Oleksandr Pikhalyonok	2	2	0	0	0	4
10	MF	(Ukraine)	5	Oleksandr Yatsyk	3	0	0	0	0	3
10	FW	(Ukraine)	11	Vladyslav Vanat	1	0	2	0	0	3
12	MF	(Ukraine)	10	Mykola Shaparenko	2	0	0	0	0	2
12	FW	(Ukraine)	70	Bohdan Redushko	2	0	0	0	0	2
12	MF	(Nigeria)	16	Shola Ogundana	1	1	0	0	0	2
12	DF	(Ukraine)	4	Denys Popov	1	0	0	0	1	2
12	MF	(Ukraine)	91	Mykola Mykhaylenko	1	0	0	0	1	2
12	FW	(Ukraine)	22	Vladyslav Kabayev	0	0	0	0	2	2
18	MF	(Ukraine)	45	Maksym Braharu	1	0	0	0	0	1
18	DF	(Senegal)	66	Aliou Thiaré	0	0	0	0	1	1
18	FW	(Romania)	77	Vladislav Blănuță	0	0	0	0	1	1
18				Own goal	1	0	0	0	0	1
TOTALS					66	12	6	2	9	93

=== Clean sheets ===
Place	Position	Nation	Number	Name	Premier League	Ukrainian Cup	Champions League	Europa League	Conference League	Total
1	GK	(Ukraine)	35	Ruslan Neshcheret	7	2	2	1	2	14
2	GK	(Ukraine)	71	Viacheslav Surkis	1	0	0	0	0	1
TOTALS					8	2	2	1	2	15

=== Disciplinary record ===
Number	Nation	Position	Name	Premier League		Ukrainian Cup		Champions League		Europa League		Conference League		Total	
Number	Nation	Position	Name	Booked	Sent off (straight red)	Booked	Sent off (straight red)	Booked	Sent off (straight red)	Booked	Sent off (straight red)	Booked	Sent off (straight red)	Booked	Sent off (straight red)
2	(Ukraine)	DF	Kostyantyn Vivcharenko	2	0	0	0	1	0	0	1	2	0	5	1
4	(Ukraine)	DF	Denys Popov	2	0	2	0	0	0	0	0	1	0	5	0
6	(Ukraine)	MF	Volodymyr Brazhko	2	0	1	0	0	0	0	0	0	0	3	0
7	(Ukraine)	MF	Andriy Yarmolenko	1	0	0	0	1	0	1	0	0	0	3	0
8	(Ukraine)	MF	Oleksandr Pikhalyonok	1	0	0	0	0	0	0	0	0	0	1	0
9	(Ukraine)	MF	Nazar Voloshyn	4	0	0	0	0	0	1	0	0	0	5	0
10	(Ukraine)	MF	Mykola Shaparenko	1	0	1	0	1	0	1	0	0	0	4	0
11	(Ukraine)	FW	Matviy Ponomarenko	3	1	0	0	0	0	0	0	1	0	5	1
16	(Nigeria)	MF	Shola Ogundana	1	0	0	0	0	0	0	0	0	0	1	0
22	(Ukraine)	FW	Vladyslav Kabayev	3	0	0	0	0	0	0	0	2	0	5	0
24	(Ukraine)	DF	Oleksandr Tymchyk	0	0	0	0	1	0	0	0	0	0	1	0
29	(Ukraine)	MF	Vitaliy Buyalskyi	3	0	0	0	0	0	0	0	0	0	3	0
32	(Ukraine)	DF	Taras Mykhavko	1	0	0	0	0	0	1	0	2	0	4	0
34	(Ukraine)	DF	Vladyslav Zakharchenko	4	0	0	0	0	0	0	0	0	0	4	0
39	(Panama)	FW	Eduardo Guerrero	0	0	1	0	0	0	0	0	1	0	2	0
40	(Ukraine)	DF	Kristian Bilovar	2	0	0	0	0	0	0	0	0	0	2	0
44	(Ukraine)	DF	Vladyslav Dubinchak	2	0	2	0	0	0	0	0	1	0	5	0
66	(Senegal)	DF	Aliou Thiaré	3	0	0	0	0	0	0	0	3	0	6	0
70	(Ukraine)	FW	Bohdan Redushko	0	0	1	0	0	0	0	0	0	0	1	0
91	(Ukraine)	MF	Mykola Mykhaylenko	1	0	0	0	1	0	2	0	1	0	5	0
Players away on loan:
Players who left Dynamo Kyiv during the season:
11	(Ukraine)	FW	Vladyslav Vanat	0	0	0	0	2	0	0	0	0	0	2	0
			TOTALS	36	1	8	0	7	0	6	1	14	0	69	2
