= Golden talent of Ukraine =

Award for young Ukrainian football players

Golden talent of Ukraine is a unique national award for young Ukrainian footballers. Winners are determined on a basis of the calendar year results in two age categories – Under-21 (players who are not older than 21 at the end of the year) and Under-19 (players who are not older than 19 at the end of the year). Annual rating is based on monthly surveys of coaches, directors of sport schools, experts, journalists and fans. The final voting is held at the end of a year, to which the participants come with bonus points (for success in the monthly surveys).

The concept of the competition was developed by a football journalist named Andrii Kudyrko. In March 2013 the first monthly survey was held.

== The competition conditions ==
Surveys are conducted in months when matches are played in the Ukrainian Championship (March, April, May, August, September, October and November, according to circumstances – June and July). Respondents call their top three of young and youthful players on a basis of the month results, their votes are summed up (1st place – 3 points, 2nd place – 2 points, 3rd place – 1 point). Indicators of monthly surveys form the annual ranking in both age categories – Under-21 and Under-19.

The top ten of a year is allowed for the final voting with bonus points (1st place – 10, 2nd – 9, ..., 10th – 1). Besides, the players who are trapped in the top 5 of a month at least once and got some bonus points (1st place – 5, 2nd – 4, ..., 5th – 1) are allowed to the final year voting. This ensures the objectivity of the competition – the players who played more consistently during a year (and not only last few months before the final voting) get additional promotion, in traditional polls the one wins more often who proved to be brighter than others at the finish, as recent events are more memorable.

The situation in the category Under-21 in 2013 clearly demonstrated that a complicated procedure of determining the winner in the competition Golden Talent of Ukraine is fair. Serhiy Bolbat got the most points in a year voting, he played the autumn excellent, but with the bonus points for the whole year Ivan Ordets celebrated total victory, who consistently played in spring and autumn.

== Prizes ==
By the end of 2013 six best players (three winners in each of two age categories) received prizes provided by competition partners – diplomas, game shoes and watches.

== The voting winners ==
=== 2013 ===
Month	Player (Under-21)	Club	Player (Under-19)	Club
March	Ivan Ordets	FC Illichivets Mariupol	Eduard Sobol	FC Shakhtar Donetsk
April	Maksym Koval	FC Dynamo Kyiv	Eduard Sobol	FC Shakhtar Donetsk
May	Ivan Ordets	FC Illichivets Mariupol	Ivan Petryak	FC Zorya Luhansk
July	Maksym Koval	FC Dynamo Kyiv	Roman Pidkivka	FC Karpaty Lviv
August	Ivan Ordets	FC Illichivets Mariupol	Roman Pidkivka	FC Karpaty Lviv
September	Serhiy Bolbat	FC Metalurh Donetsk	Eduard Sobol	FC Shakhtar Donetsk
October	Serhiy Bolbat	FC Metalurh Donetsk	Dmytro Yarchuk	FC Tavriya Simferopol
November	Serhiy Bolbat Redvan Memeshev	FC Metalurh Donetsk FC Volyn Lutsk	Dmytro Yarchuk	FC Tavriya Simferopol
2013 (final)	Ivan Ordets	FC Illichivets Mariupol	Eduard Sobol	FC Shakhtar Donetsk

=== 2014 ===
Month	Player (Under-21)	Club	Player (Under-19)	Club
March	Serhiy Bolbat	FC Metalurh Donetsk	Roman Pidkivka	FC Karpaty Lviv
April	Mykyta Shevchenko	FC Zorya Luhansk	Roman Pidkivka	FC Karpaty Lviv
May	Serhiy Bolbat	FC Metalurh Donetsk	Eduard Sobol	FC Shakhtar Donetsk
August	Ruslan Malinovskyi	FC Zorya Luhansk	Valeriy Luchkevych	FC Dnipro Dnipropetrovsk
September	Serhiy Bolbat	FC Metalist Kharkiv	Valeriy Luchkevych	FC Dnipro Dnipropetrovsk
October	Mykyta Shevchenko	FC Zorya Luhansk	Valeriy Luchkevych	FC Dnipro Dnipropetrovsk
November	Serhiy Myakushko	FC Hoverla Uzhhorod	Valeriy Luchkevych	FC Dnipro Dnipropetrovsk
2014 (final)	Ruslan Malinovskyi	FC Zorya Luhansk	Valeriy Luchkevych	FC Dnipro Dnipropetrovsk

=== 2015 ===
Month	Player (Under-21)	Club	Player (Under-19)	Club
March	Serhiy Hryn	FC Illichivets Mariupol	Valeriy Luchkevych	FC Dnipro Dnipropetrovsk
April	Serhiy Hryn	FC Illichivets Mariupol	Maryan Shved	FC Karpaty Lviv
May	Serhiy Hryn	FC Illichivets Mariupol	Valeriy Luchkevych	FC Dnipro Dnipropetrovsk
August	Ivan Petryak	FC Zorya Luhansk	Viktor Kovalenko	FC Shakhtar Donetsk
September	Ivan Petryak	FC Zorya Luhansk	Viktor Kovalenko	FC Shakhtar Donetsk
October	Ivan Petryak	FC Zorya Luhansk	Viktor Kovalenko	FC Shakhtar Donetsk
November	Ivan Petryak	FC Zorya Luhansk	Oleksandr Zinchenko	FC Ufa
2015 (final)	Ivan Petryak	FC Zorya Luhansk	Viktor Kovalenko	FC Shakhtar Donetsk

=== 2016 ===
Month	Player (Under-21)	Club	Player (Under-19)	Club
March	Viktor Kovalenko	FC Shakhtar Donetsk	Maryan Shved	Sevilla FC
April	Viktor Kovalenko	FC Shakhtar Donetsk	Oleksiy Hutsulyak	FC Karpaty Lviv
May	Viktor Kovalenko	FC Shakhtar Donetsk	Oleksiy Hutsulyak	FC Karpaty Lviv
August	Viktor Kovalenko	FC Shakhtar Donetsk	Denys Balanyuk	FC Dnipro
September	Viktor Kovalenko	FC Shakhtar Donetsk	Viktor Tsyhankov	FC Dynamo Kyiv
October	Roman Yaremchuk	FC Oleksandriya	Viktor Tsyhankov	FC Dynamo Kyiv
November	Artem Besyedin	FC Dynamo Kyiv	Viktor Tsyhankov	FC Dynamo Kyiv
2016 (final)	Viktor Kovalenko	FC Shakhtar Donetsk	Viktor Tsyhankov	FC Dynamo Kyiv

=== 2017 ===
Month	Player (Under-21)	Club	Player (Under-19)	Club
March	Artem Besyedin	FC Dynamo Kyiv	Andriy Lunin	FC Dnipro
April	Artem Besyedin	FC Dynamo Kyiv	Andriy Lunin	FC Dnipro
May	Artem Besyedin	FC Dynamo Kyiv	Andriy Lunin	FC Dnipro
July	Viktor Tsyhankov	FC Dynamo Kyiv	Stanislav Bilenkyi	FC Olimpik Donetsk
August	Mykola Matviyenko	FC Vorskla Poltava	Stanislav Bilenkyi	FC Olimpik Donetsk
September	Mykola Matviyenko	FC Vorskla Poltava	Andriy Lunin	FC Zorya Luhansk
October	Mykola Matviyenko	FC Vorskla Poltava	Andriy Lunin	FC Zorya Luhansk
November	Viktor Tsyhankov	FC Dynamo Kyiv	Andriy Lunin	FC Zorya Luhansk
2017 (final)	Viktor Tsyhankov	FC Dynamo Kyiv	Andriy Lunin	FC Zorya Luhansk

=== 2018 ===
Month	Player (Under-21)	Club	Player (Under-19)	Club
March	Viktor Tsyhankov	FC Dynamo Kyiv	Andriy Lunin	FC Zorya Luhansk
April	Viktor Tsyhankov	FC Dynamo Kyiv	Andriy Lunin	FC Zorya Luhansk
May	Viktor Tsyhankov	FC Dynamo Kyiv	Andriy Lunin	FC Zorya Luhansk
July	Viktor Tsyhankov	FC Dynamo Kyiv	Vladyslav Supriaha	SC Dnipro-1
August	Maryan Shved	FC Karpaty Lviv	Vladyslav Supriaha	FC Dynamo Kyiv
September	Viktor Tsyhankov	FC Dynamo Kyiv	Vladyslav Vakula	FC Mariupol
October	Mykola Shaparenko	FC Dynamo Kyiv	Vitalii Mykolenko	FC Dynamo Kyiv
November	Viktor Tsyhankov	FC Dynamo Kyiv	Vitalii Mykolenko	FC Dynamo Kyiv
2018 (final)	Viktor Tsyhankov	FC Dynamo Kyiv	Vitalii Mykolenko	FC Dynamo Kyiv

=== 2019 ===
Month	Player (Under-21)	Club	Player (Under-19)	Club
March	Vitalii Mykolenko	FC Dynamo Kyiv	Heorhiy Tsitaishvili	FC Dynamo Kyiv
April	Vitalii Mykolenko	FC Dynamo Kyiv	Heorhiy Tsitaishvili	FC Dynamo Kyiv
May–June	Andriy Lunin	CD Leganés	Danylo Sikan	FC Mariupol
August	Bohdan Lyednyev	FC Zorya Luhansk	Oleksandr Nazarenko	SC Dnipro-1
September	Bohdan Lyednyev	FC Zorya Luhansk	Vladyslav Supriaha	SC Dnipro-1
October	Bohdan Lyednyev	FC Zorya Luhansk	Oleksandr Nazarenko	SC Dnipro-1
November	Vitalii Mykolenko	FC Dynamo Kyiv	Danylo Sikan	FC Shakhtar Donetsk
2019 (final)	Vitalii Mykolenko	FC Dynamo Kyiv	Heorhiy Tsitaishvili	FC Dynamo Kyiv

=== 2020 ===
Month	Player (Under-21)	Club	Player (Under-19)	Club
March	Vladyslav Supriaha	SC Dnipro-1	Arseniy Batahov	SC Dnipro-1
April–May	COVID-19 pandemic			
June	Andriy Lunin	Real Oviedo	Pavlo Isenko	FC Vorskla Poltava
Jule	Vladyslav Supriaha	SC Dnipro-1	Anatoliy Trubin	FC Shakhtar Donetsk
September	Vladyslav Supriaha	FC Dynamo Kyiv	Illya Zabarnyi	FC Dynamo Kyiv
October	Viktor Korniyenko	FC Shakhtar Donetsk	Illya Zabarnyi	FC Dynamo Kyiv
November	Vitalii Mykolenko	FC Dynamo Kyiv	Illya Zabarnyi	FC Dynamo Kyiv
2020 (final)	Vitalii Mykolenko	FC Dynamo Kyiv	Illya Zabarnyi	FC Dynamo Kyiv

=== 2021 ===
Month	Player (Under-21)	Club	Player (Under-19)	Club
February	Anatoliy Trubin	FC Shakhtar Donetsk	Illya Zabarnyi	FC Dynamo Kyiv
March	Anatoliy Trubin	FC Shakhtar Donetsk	Illya Zabarnyi	FC Dynamo Kyiv
April	Anatoliy Trubin	FC Shakhtar Donetsk	Illya Zabarnyi	FC Dynamo Kyiv
May	Anatoliy Trubin	FC Shakhtar Donetsk	Illya Zabarnyi	FC Dynamo Kyiv
August	Mykhailo Mudryk	FC Shakhtar Donetsk	Illya Zabarnyi	FC Dynamo Kyiv
September	Mykhailo Mudryk	FC Shakhtar Donetsk	Illya Zabarnyi	FC Dynamo Kyiv
October	Mykhailo Mudryk	FC Shakhtar Donetsk	Illya Zabarnyi	FC Dynamo Kyiv
November	Mykhailo Mudryk	FC Shakhtar Donetsk	Illya Zabarnyi	FC Dynamo Kyiv
2021 (final)	Mykhailo Mudryk	FC Shakhtar Donetsk	Illya Zabarnyi	FC Dynamo Kyiv

=== 2022 ===
Month	Player (Under-21)	Club	Player (Under-19)	Club
March	Russo-Ukrainian War			
April	Russo-Ukrainian War			
May	Russo-Ukrainian War			
September	Mykhailo Mudryk	FC Shakhtar Donetsk	Nazar Voloshyn	FC Kryvbas Kryvyi Rih
October	Mykhailo Mudryk	FC Shakhtar Donetsk	Marko Sapuha	FC Rukh Lviv
November	Mykhailo Mudryk	FC Shakhtar Donetsk	Nazar Voloshyn	FC Kryvbas Kryvyi Rih
2022 (final)	Mykhailo Mudryk	FC Shakhtar Donetsk	Nazar Voloshyn	FC Kryvbas Kryvyi Rih

=== 2023 ===
Month	Player (Under-21)	Club	Player (Under-19)	Club
March	Heorhiy Sudakov	FC Shakhtar Donetsk	Anton Tsarenko	FC Dynamo Kyiv
April	Vladyslav Vanat	FC Dynamo Kyiv	Anton Tsarenko	FC Dynamo Kyiv
May	Volodymyr Brazhko	FC Zorya Luhansk	Andriy Buleza	FC Mynai
August	Illya Zabarnyi	AFC Bournemouth	Bohdan Slyubyk	FC Rukh Lviv
September	Heorhiy Sudakov	FC Shakhtar Donetsk	Bohdan Slyubyk	FC Rukh Lviv
October	Heorhiy Sudakov	FC Shakhtar Donetsk	Yevheniy Pastukh	FC Rukh Lviv
November	Illya Zabarnyi	AFC Bournemouth	Yehor Yarmolyuk	Brentford F.C.
2023 (final)	Heorhiy Sudakov	FC Shakhtar Donetsk	Yehor Yarmolyuk	Brentford F.C.

=== 2024 ===
Month	Player (Under-21)	Club	Player (Under-19)	Club
March	Nazar Voloshyn	FC Dynamo Kyiv	Taras Mykhavko	FC Dynamo Kyiv
April	Nazar Voloshyn	FC Dynamo Kyiv	Matviy Ponomarenko	FC Dynamo Kyiv
May	Nazar Voloshyn	FC Dynamo Kyiv	Matviy Ponomarenko	FC Dynamo Kyiv
August	Illya Kvasnytsya	FC Rukh Lviv	Taras Mykhavko	FC Dynamo Kyiv
September	Illya Krupskyi	FC Vorskla Poltava	Taras Mykhavko	FC Dynamo Kyiv
October	Oleh Ocheretko	FC Karpaty Lviv	Taras Mykhavko	FC Dynamo Kyiv
November-december	Yehor Yarmolyuk	Brentford F.C.	Taras Mykhavko	FC Dynamo Kyiv
2024 (final)	Yehor Yarmolyuk	Brentford F.C.	Taras Mykhavko	FC Dynamo Kyiv

=== 2025 ===
Month	Player (Under-21)	Club	Player (Under-19)	Club
March	Yehor Yarmolyuk	Brentford F.C.	Artem Stepanov	Bayer 04 Leverkusen
April	Yehor Yarmolyuk	Brentford F.C.	Artem Stepanov	Bayer 04 Leverkusen
May	Yehor Yarmolyuk	Brentford F.C.	Denys Marchenko	FC Obolon Kyiv
August	Yehor Yarmolyuk	Brentford F.C.	Bohdan Popov	Empoli FC
September	Yehor Yarmolyuk	Brentford F.C.	Hennadiy Synchuk	CF Montréal
October	Yehor Yarmolyuk	Brentford F.C.	Nazar Domchak	FC Karpaty Lviv
November-december	Yehor Yarmolyuk	Brentford F.C.	Matviy Ponomarenko	FC Dynamo Kyiv
2025 (final)	Yehor Yarmolyuk	Brentford F.C.	Matviy Ponomarenko	FC Dynamo Kyiv

=== 2026 ===
Month	Player (Under-21)	Club	Player (Under-19)	Club
February-march	Matviy Ponomarenko	FC Dynamo Kyiv	Bohdan Redushko	FC Dynamo Kyiv
April	Matviy Ponomarenko	FC Dynamo Kyiv	Nazar Domchak	FC Karpaty Lviv
May	Matviy Ponomarenko	FC Dynamo Kyiv	Nazar Domchak	FC Karpaty Lviv
August	Matviy Ponomarenko	FC Dynamo Kyiv	Artem Stepanov	FC Utrecht
September	Matviy Ponomarenko	FC Dynamo Kyiv	Artem Stepanov	FC Utrecht
October	Ramik Hadzhyiev	FC Kharkiv	Nazar Domchak	SK Slavia Prague
November-december				
2026 (final)				
