= Matviy Ponomarenko =

Ukrainian footballer

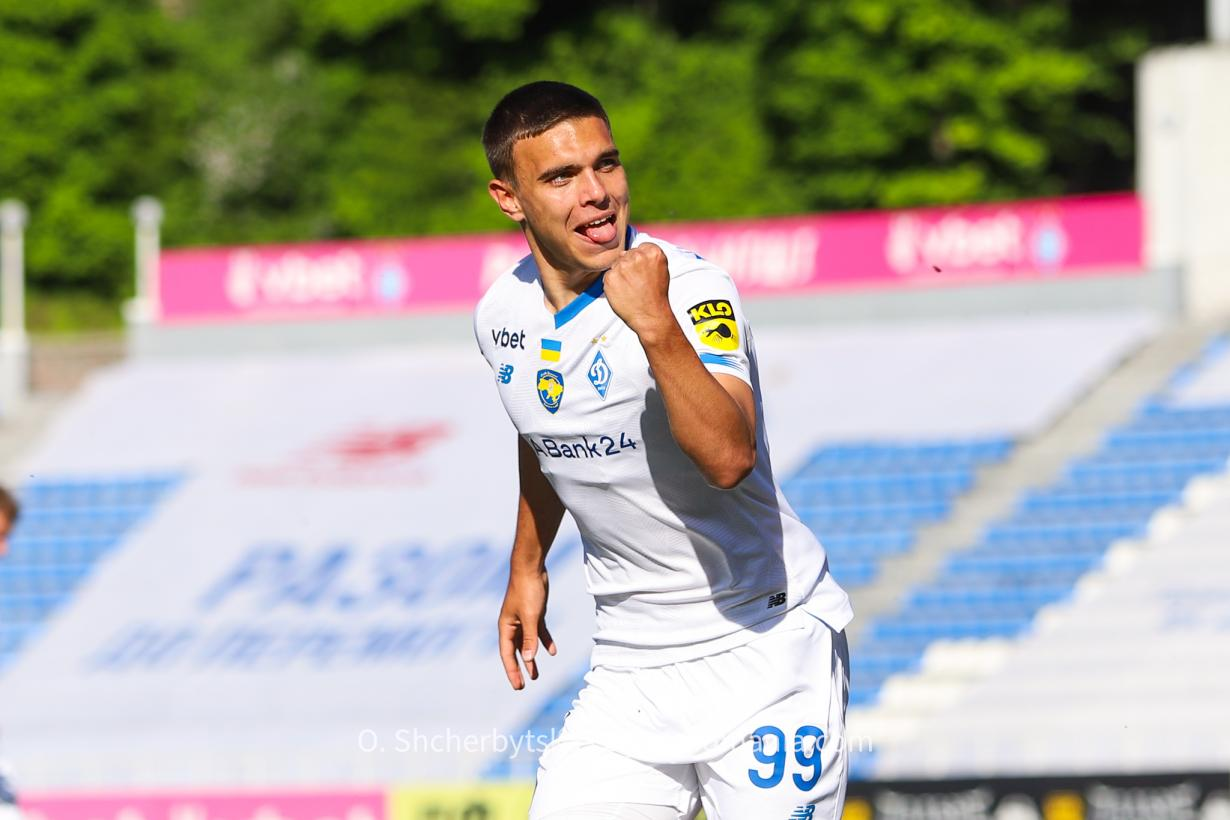
- Ponomarenko in 2024

Personal information
- Full name: Matviy Ruslanovych Ponomarenko
- Date of birth: 11 January 2006 (age 20)
- Place of birth: Myronivka, Kyiv Oblast, Ukraine
- Height: 1.88 m (6 ft 2 in)
- Position: Striker

Team information
- Current team: Dynamo Kyiv
- Number: 11

Youth career
- 2012–2013: Sportive School #1 Myronivka
- 2013–2022: Dynamo Kyiv

Senior career*
Years	Team	Apps	(Gls)
2022–	Dynamo Kyiv	34	(20)
2022–2023	→ Zorya Luhansk (loan)	0	(0)

International career^{‡}
2022–2023	Ukraine U17	6	(8)
2023	Ukraine U18	3	(2)
2023–2024	Ukraine U19	14	(10)
2025	Ukraine U20	7	(1)
2025–	Ukraine U21	1	(0)
2026–	Ukraine	6	(1)
Medal record
Men's football
Representing Ukraine
UEFA European Under-19 Championship
Bronze medal – third place	2024 Northern Ireland
- * Club domestic league appearances and goals as of 23 October 2026 ‡ National team caps and goals as of 6 October 2026

Matviy Ruslanovych Ponomarenko (Ukrainian: Матвій Русланович Пономаренко; born 11 January 2006) is a Ukrainian professional footballer who plays as a striker for Dynamo Kyiv and the Ukraine national team.

== Club career ==
Born in Myronivka, Kyiv Oblast, Ponomarenko began his sportive career in the local sportive school #1, where his first trainer was Mykhaylo Halych. He is a product of the Dynamo Kyiv football academy from the age of seven.

He played for FC Dynamo Kyiv and Zorya Luhansk (as loaned player) in the Ukrainian Premier League Reserves and later was promoted to the senior Dynamo's team. Ponomarenko made his debut for FC Dynamo in the Ukrainian Premier League as a second-half substitute against Shakhtar Donetsk on 3 November 2023. He scored his first goal in a 3–0 win over Veres Rivne on 1 May 2024.

== International career ==
In July 2024, Ponomarenko was called up by manager Dmytro Mykhaylenko to the final squad of the Ukraine national under-19 football team to play in the 2024 UEFA European Under-19 Championship tournament matches. The Ukrainian national team reached the semi-finals with Ponomarenko scoring a game winner against Italy.

On 26 March 2026, he scored on his debut for Ukraine national team in a 3–1 loss to Sweden during the 2026 FIFA World Cup qualification, as Ukraine missed out of the 2026 FIFA World Cup.

== Career statistics ==
=== Club ===
As of match played 27 October 2026

Appearances and goals by club, season and competition
Club	Season	League			Cup		Europe		Other		Total	
Club	Season	Division	Apps	Goals	Apps	Goals	Apps	Goals	Apps	Goals	Apps	Goals
Dynamo Kyiv	2022–23	Ukrainian Premier League	0	0	0	0	0	0	—		0	0
Dynamo Kyiv	2023–24	Ukrainian Premier League	8	1	0	0	0	0	—		8	1
Dynamo Kyiv	2024–25	Ukrainian Premier League	2	1	1	0	2 (Note: Appearances in UEFA Europa League)	0	—		5	1
Dynamo Kyiv	2025–26	Ukrainian Premier League	15	13	2	2	6 (Note: Three appearances in UEFA Champions League, one appearance in UEFA Europa League, two appearances and one goal in UEFA Conference League)	1	—		23	16
Dynamo Kyiv	2026–27	Ukrainian Premier League	9	5	1	0	6 (Note: Four appearances in UEFA Europa League, two appearances and one goal in UEFA Conference League)	1	—		16	6
Dynamo Kyiv	Total		34	20	4	2	14	2	—		52	24
Zorya Luhansk (loan)	2022–23	Ukrainian Premier League	0	0	0	0	0	0	—		0	0
Career total			34	20	4	2	14	2	0	0	52	24

=== International ===
As of match played 5 October 2026

National team	Year	Apps	Goals
Ukraine	2026	6	1
Total		6	1

Scores and results list Ukraine goal tally first, score column indicates score after each Ponomarenko goal

List of international goals scored by Matviy Ponomarenko
No.	Date	Venue	Opponent	Score	Result	Competition
1	26 March 2026	Estadi Ciutat de València, Valencia, Spain	Sweden	1–3	1–3	2026 FIFA World Cup qualification

== Honours ==
Dynamo Kyiv

- Ukrainian Premier League: 2024–25
- Ukrainian Cup: 2025–26

Individual

- 2024–25 UEFA Youth League top scorer (shared): 8
- Golden talent of Ukraine: 2025 (U19)
- 2025–26 Ukrainian Premier League top scorer: 13
