= Oleksandr Yatsyk =

Ukrainian footballer

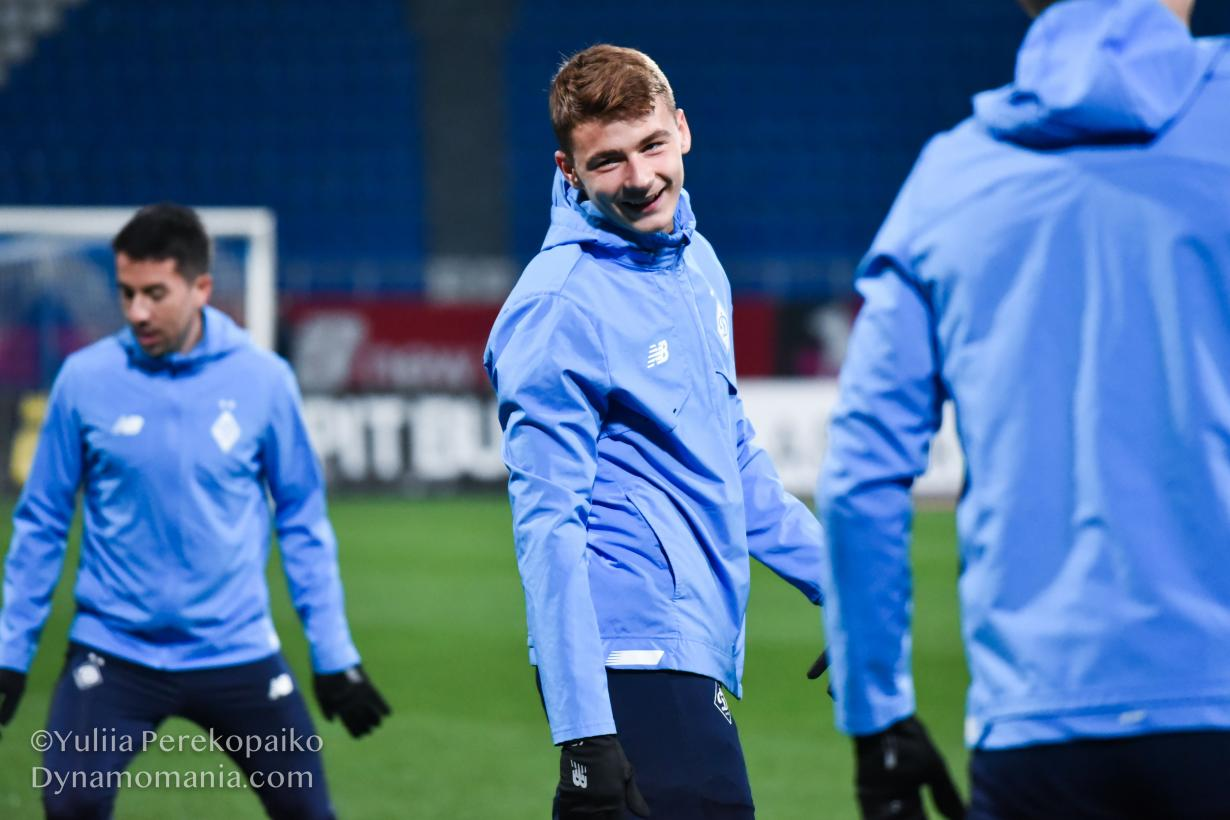

Personal information
- Full name: Oleksandr Oleksandrovych Yatsyk
- Date of birth: 3 January 2003 (age 23)
- Place of birth: Kyiv, Ukraine
- Height: 1.82 m (6 ft 0 in)
- Position: Central midfielder

Team information
- Current team: FC Kharkiv
- Number: 8

Youth career
- 2015–2019: Zmina-Obolon Kyiv
- 2019: Dynamo Kyiv

Senior career*
Years	Team	Apps	(Gls)
2019–2026	Dynamo Kyiv	20	(3)
2023–2025	→ Zorya Luhansk (loan)	47	(8)
2026–	FC Kharkiv	0	(0)

International career^{‡}
2019	Ukraine U17	11	(1)
2021–2022	Ukraine U19	5	(0)
2023–2025	Ukraine U21	10	(1)
- * Club domestic league appearances and goals as of 19 June 2026 ‡ National team caps and goals as of 19 June 2025

Oleksandr Oleksandrovych Yatsyk (Ukrainian: Олександр Олександрович Яцик; born 3 January 2003) is a Ukrainian professional footballer who plays as a central midfielder for FC Kharkiv.

== Club career ==
Yatsyk made his debut for Dynamo Kyiv on 23 August 2022, playing as a second-half substitute player in a losing away match against Portuguese club Benfica in the 2022–23 UEFA Champions League play-off round.

== Career statistics ==
As of match played 24 May 2026

Appearances and goals by club, season and competition
Club	Season	League			Cup		Europe		Other		Total	
Club	Season	Division	Apps	Goals	Apps	Goals	Apps	Goals	Apps	Goals	Apps	Goals
Dynamo Kyiv	2022–23	Ukrainian Premier League	2	0	0	0	1 (Note: Appearance in UEFA Champions League)	0	—		3	0
Dynamo Kyiv	2025–26	Ukrainian Premier League	17	3	2	0	7 (Note: One appearance in UEFA Champions League, one appearance in UEFA Europa League, five appearances in UEFA Conference League)	0	—		26	3
Dynamo Kyiv	Total		19	3	2	0	8	0	0	0	29	3
Zorya Luhansk (loan)	2023–24	Ukrainian Premier League	20	3	1	0	5 (Note: Two appearances in UEFA Europa League, three appearances in UEFA Conference League)	0	—		26	3
Zorya Luhansk (loan)	2024–25	Ukrainian Premier League	28	5	2	1	—		—		30	6
Zorya Luhansk (loan)	Total		48	8	3	1	5	0	—		56	9
Career total			67	11	5	1	13	0	0	0	85	12

== Honours ==
Dynamo Kyiv

- Ukrainian Cup: 2025–26
