= Shola Ogundana =

Nigerian footballer (born 2005)

Personal information
- Full name: Elijah Oluwashola Ogundana
- Date of birth: 22 February 2005 (age 21)
- Place of birth: Ifaki, Nigeria
- Height: 1.72 m (5 ft 8 in)
- Position: Winger

Team information
- Current team: Dynamo Kyiv
- Number: 16

Youth career
- Beyond Limits
- 2022: → Alex Transfiguration (loan)
- 2023–2024: → Flamengo (loan)
- 2024–2025: Flamengo

Senior career*
Years	Team	Apps	(Gls)
2024–2025	Flamengo	5	(0)
2025–	Dynamo Kyiv	19	(2)
- * Club domestic league appearances and goals as of 16:09, 22 November 2026 (UTC)

Elijah Oluwashola Ogundana (born 22 February 2005), known as Shola, is a Nigerian professional footballer who plays as a winger for Ukrainian Premier League club Dynamo Kyiv.

== Career ==
Born in Ifaki, Ekiti State, Shola played for Beyond Limits Football Academy, the youth side of Remo Stars, before being scouted by Flamengo in the 2022 Torneo di Viareggio, while playing for Alex Transfiguration Football Academy. He agreed to join the Brazilian club in April 2023, after his 18th birthday, but only had his loan contract registered in July.

Shola helped the under-20 side to win both the 2024 U-20 Copa Libertadores and the 2024 Under-20 Intercontinental Cup, scoring the opening goal in the former's final. On 17 July of that year, Flamengo bought him outright, paying R$ 2.4 million for 70% of his economic rights.

Shola made his senior – and Série A – debut on 14 November 2024, coming on as a late substitute for Carlos Alcaraz in a 0–0 home draw against Atlético Mineiro; he became the first Nigerian to play for the club, and the third African in the club's history.

=== Dynamo Kyiv ===
On 1 September 2025, Shola signed a four-year contract with Ukrainian champions Dynamo Kyiv.

== Career statistics ==
As of match played 22 November 2026

Appearances and goals by club, season and competition
Club	Season	League			National cup (Note: Includes Ukrainian Cup)		Continental		Other		Total	
Club	Season	Division	Apps	Goals	Apps	Goals	Apps	Goals	Apps	Goals	Apps	Goals
Flamengo	2024	Série A	1	0	—		0	0	—		1	0
Flamengo	2025	Série A	0	0	0	0	0	0	4 (Note: Appearances in Campeonato Carioca)	0	4	0
Flamengo	Total		1	0	0	0	0	0	4	0	5	0
Dynamo Kyiv	2025–26	Ukrainian Premier League	15	1	4	1	5 (Note: Appearances in UEFA Conference League)	0	—		24	2
Dynamo Kyiv	2026–27	Ukrainian Premier League	4	1	1	0	3 (Note: Two appearances in UEFA Europa League, one appearance in UEFA Conference League)	0	—		8	1
Dynamo Kyiv	Total		19	2	5	1	8	0	—		32	3
Career total			20	2	5	1	8	0	4	0	37	3

== Honours ==
Flamengo U20

- Under-20 Intercontinental Cup: 2024, 2025
- U-20 Copa Libertadores: 2024, 2025

Flamengo

- Copa do Brasil: 2024
- Campeonato Carioca: 2025

Dynamo Kyiv

- Ukrainian Cup: 2025–26
