= Viktor Kovalenko (footballer) =

Ukrainian footballer (born 1996)

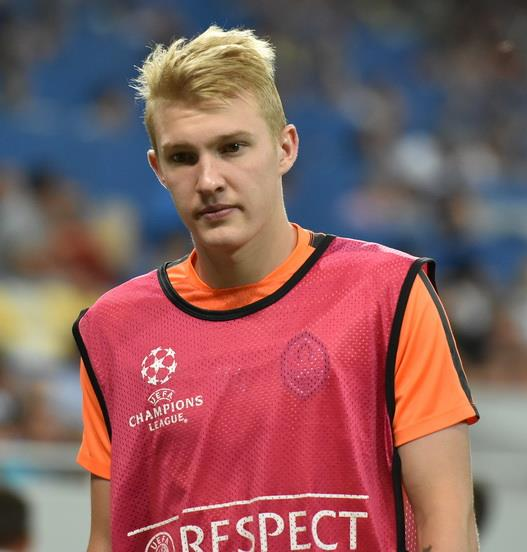
- Kovalenko with Shakhtar Donetsk in 2015

Personal information
- Full name: Viktor Viktorovych Kovalenko
- Date of birth: 14 February 1996 (age 30)
- Place of birth: Kherson, Ukraine
- Height: 1.82 m (6 ft 0 in)
- Position: Midfielder

Youth career
- 2008–2015: Shakhtar Donetsk

Senior career*
Years	Team	Apps	(Gls)
2014–2021	Shakhtar Donetsk	130	(23)
2021–2024	Atalanta	1	(0)
2021–2022	→ Spezia (loan)	26	(1)
2022–2023	→ Spezia (loan)	19	(0)
2023–2024	→ Empoli (loan)	17	(1)
2025	Empoli	6	(0)
2025–2026	Aris Limassol	6	(0)
2026	Olympiakos Nicosia	13	(2)

International career^{‡}
2011–2012	Ukraine U16	13	(4)
2010–2013	Ukraine U17	20	(11)
2013–2015	Ukraine U19	20	(5)
2015	Ukraine U20	5	(5)
2015–2018	Ukraine U21	13	(6)
2016–	Ukraine	33	(0)
- * Club domestic league appearances and goals as of 14 June 2026 ‡ National team caps and goals as of 11 November 2021

Viktor Viktorovych Kovalenko (Ukrainian: Ві́ктор Ві́кторович Ковале́нко; born 14 February 1996) is a Ukrainian professional footballer who played as a midfielder for the Ukraine national team.

== Club career ==
=== Shakhtar Donetsk ===
Kovalenko is product of youth team of Shakhtar Donetsk. He made his début in the Ukrainian Premier League for Shakhtar in the game against Vorskla Poltava on 28 February 2015. On 9 May 2015, he made his first direct contribution for the first team when assisting the fifth and sixth goals for Shakhtar in a 7–3 win over Hoverla Uzhhorod.

On 20 February 2020, Kovalenko scored the winning goal in Shakhtar's 2–1 win against Benfica in the first leg of their Europa League Round of 32 clash.

On 17 October 2020, Kovalenko scored twice in the first 18 minutes of Shakhtar's 5–1 hammering of FC Lviv in the Ukrainian Premier League.

=== Atalanta ===
On 1 February 2021, with less than six months remaining in his contract with Shakhtar, Kovalenko signed a four-and-a-half-year deal with Serie A club Atalanta for a reported fee of €700,000. He made his debut for the club on 21 March, as an 87th-minute substitute for fellow countryman Ruslan Malinovskyi in a Serie A 2–0 win at Verona.

==== Loans to Spezia ====
On 8 August 2021, Kovalenko joined fellow Serie A side Spezia on a season-long loan.

On 2 August 2022, he returned to Spezia on another loan, with Spezia holding an obligation to buy if the club avoids relegation.

=== Release by Atalanta ===
Kovalenko was released from his contract by Atalanta in August 2024 at the end of the summer transfer window.

=== Empoli ===
On 11 February 2025, Kovalenko signed for Empoli on a free transfer after being released.

=== Aris Limassol ===
In September 2025 Kovalenko moved to Cypriot First Division club Aris LImassol on a two-year contract.

=== Olympiakos Nicosia ===
In February 2026 he moved to Olympiakos Nicosia.

== International career ==
Kovalenko was called up by Ukraine to play in the 2015 FIFA U-20 World Cup in New Zealand. He scored two goals in a 6–0 victory over Myanmar and added a hat-trick against the United States to secure 3–0 win at North Harbour Stadium in Auckland, as the team reached the round of 16. He won the Golden Boot of the 2015 FIFA U-20 World Cup with five goals.

== Career statistics ==
=== Club ===
As of match played 25 May 2025

Appearances and goals by club, season and competition
Club	Season	League			National cup		Europe		Other		Total	
Club	Season	Division	Apps	Goals	Apps	Goals	Apps	Goals	Apps	Goals	Apps	Goals
Shakhtar Donetsk	2014–15	Ukrainian Premier League	2	0	2	0	0	0	0	0	4	0
Shakhtar Donetsk	2015–16	Ukrainian Premier League	23	0	7	2	15 (Note: Seven appearances in UEFA Champions League, eight appearances and two goals in UEFA Europa League)	2	1	0	46	4
Shakhtar Donetsk	2016–17	Ukrainian Premier League	28	7	1	0	8 (Note: Appearances in UEFA Europa League)	3	1	0	38	10
Shakhtar Donetsk	2017–18	Ukrainian Premier League	27	4	4	1	5 (Note: Appearances in UEFA Champions League)	0	1	0	37	5
Shakhtar Donetsk	2018–19	Ukrainian Premier League	25	7	3	0	6 (Note: Six appearances in UEFA Champions League, two appearances in UEFA Europa League)	0	1	0	37	7
Shakhtar Donetsk	2019–20	Ukrainian Premier League	17	1	1	0	9 (Note: Five appearances in UEFA Champions League, four appearances and one goal in UEFA Europa League)	1	0	0	27	2
Shakhtar Donetsk	2020–21	Ukrainian Premier League	8	4	0	0	3	0	0	0	11	4
Shakhtar Donetsk	Total		130	23	18	3	48	6	4	0	200	32
Atalanta	2020–21	Serie A	1	0	0	0	—		—		1	0
Spezia (loan)	2021–22	Serie A	26	1	1	0	—		—		27	1
Spezia (loan)	2022–23	Serie A	19	0	1	0	—		—		20	0
Empoli (loan)	2023–24	Serie A	17	1	0	0	—		—		17	1
Empoli	2024–25	Serie A	6	0	2	1	—		—		8	1
Career total			199	26	22	4	48	6	4	0	273	36

=== International ===
As of 11 November 2021

Appearances and goals by national team and year
National team	Year	Apps	Goals
Ukraine	2016	10	0
Ukraine	2017	6	0
Ukraine	2018	4	0
Ukraine	2019	6	0
Ukraine	2020	4	0
Ukraine	2021	3	0
Total		33	0

== Honours ==
Shakhtar Donetsk

- Ukrainian Premier League: 2016–17, 2017–18, 2018–19, 2019–20
- Ukrainian Cup: 2015–16, 2016–17, 2017–18, 2018–19
- Ukrainian Super Cup: 2015, 2017

Individual

- FIFA World Youth Championship Golden Shoe: 2015
- Ukrainian Premier League Best young player: 2015–16
- Golden talent of Ukraine: 2015 (U-19), 2016 (U-21)
