= Taras Mykhavko =

Ukrainian footballer (born 2005)

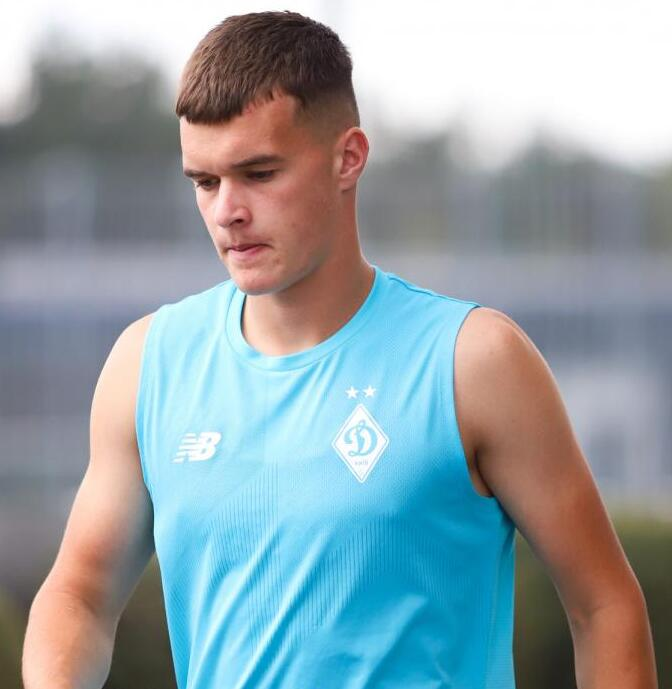

Personal information
- Full name: Taras Vasylyovych Mykhavko
- Date of birth: 30 May 2005 (age 21)
- Place of birth: Dobrohostiv, Lviv Oblast, Ukraine
- Height: 1.85 m (6 ft 1 in)
- Position: Defender

Team information
- Current team: Dynamo Kyiv
- Number: 32

Youth career
- 2018–2019: Skala Stryi
- 2019–2023: Lviv

Senior career*
Years	Team	Apps	(Gls)
2023	Lviv	4	(0)
2023–	Dynamo Kyiv	68	(6)

International career^{‡}
2023–2024	Ukraine U19	12	(2)
2024–	Ukraine U21	8	(1)
2024	Ukraine U23	2	(0)
2025–	Ukraine	3	(0)
Medal record
Men's football
Representing Ukraine
UEFA European Under-19 Championship
Bronze medal – third place	2024 Northern Ireland
- * Club domestic league appearances and goals as of 23 October 2026 ‡ National team caps and goals as of 6 October 2026

Taras Vasylyovych Mykhavko (Ukrainian: Тарас Васильович Михавко; born 30 May 2005) is a Ukrainian professional footballer who plays as a defender for Dynamo Kyiv and the Ukraine national team.

== Career ==
Born in Dobrohostiv, Drohobych Raion, Mykhavko is a product of the neighbouring Skala Stryi and the Lviv football academies.

He played for FC Lviv in the Ukrainian Premier League Reserves and later was promoted to the senior team. Mykhavko made his debut for FC Lviv in the Ukrainian Premier League as a second-half substitute against FC Rukh Lviv on 21 May 2023. In July 2023 he signed a contract with another Ukrainian Premier League side FC Dynamo Kyiv.

== International career ==
In May 2024, Mykhavko was called up by Ruslan Rotan to the Ukraine Olympic football team squad to play at the 2024 Maurice Revello Tournament in France.

Also in July 2024, he was called up by manager Dmytro Mykhaylenko to the final squad of the Ukraine national under-19 football team to play in the 2024 UEFA European Under-19 Championship tournament matches.

On 13 November 2025, Mykhavko debuted for the senior national team in a 2026 FIFA World Cup qualifier against France.

== Career statistics ==
=== Club ===
As of match played 27 October 2026

Appearances and goals by club, season and competition
Club	Season	League			Cup		Europe		Other		Total	
Club	Season	Division	Apps	Goals	Apps	Goals	Apps	Goals	Apps	Goals	Apps	Goals
Lviv	2022–23	Ukrainian Premier League	4	0	—		—		—		4	0
Dynamo Kyiv	2023–24	Ukrainian Premier League	8	0	0	0	0	0	0	0	8	0
Dynamo Kyiv	2024–25	Ukrainian Premier League	26	1	2	0	11 (Note: Four appearances in UEFA Champions League, seven appearances in UEFA Europa League)	0	0	0	39	1
Dynamo Kyiv	2025–26	Ukrainian Premier League	25	5	3	0	11 (Note: Four appearances in UEFA Champions League, two appearances in UEFA Europa League, five appearances in UEFA Conference League)	0	—		39	5
Dynamo Kyiv	2026–27	Ukrainian Premier League	9	1	2	0	6 (Note: Four appearances in UEFA Europa League, two appearances in UEFA Conference League)	0	—		17	1
Dynamo Kyiv	Total		68	7	7	0	28	0	0	0	103	7
Career total			72	7	7	0	28	0	0	0	107	7

=== International ===
As of match played 5 October 2026

Appearances and goals by national team and year
National team	Year	Apps	Goals
Ukraine	2025	1	0
Ukraine	2026	2	0
Total		3	0

== Honours ==
Dynamo Kyiv

- Ukrainian Premier League: 2024–25
- Ukrainian Cup: 2025–26

Ukraine U23

- Toulon Tournament: 2024

Individual

- Golden talent of Ukraine: 2024 (U19)
- Ukrainian Premier League Young Player of the Year: 2024–25
