= 2019 Ukrainian Cup final =

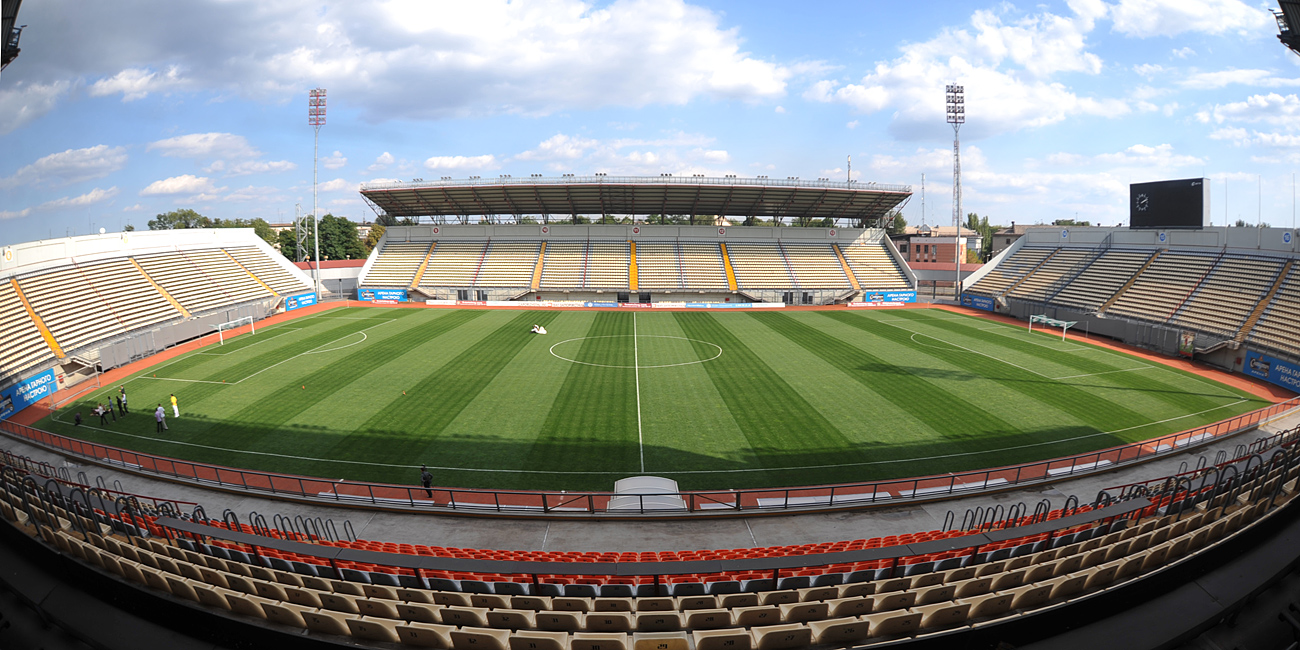
- Event: 2018–19 Ukrainian Cup
Shakhtar Donetsk	Inhulets Petrove
4	0
- Date: 15 May 2019
- Venue: Slavutych Arena, Zaporizhzhia
- Referee: Yevhen Aranovskyi

The 2019 Ukrainian Cup final was a football match that was played on 15 May 2019 in Zaporizhzhia between Shakhtar Donetsk and Inhulets Petrove. The match was the 28th Ukrainian Cup Final since the fall of the Soviet Union. It was the first time the cup final was held in Zaporizhzhia.

Slavutych Arena, where the match was played, had previously hosted the 2010 Ukrainian Super Cup. It was the first final of the Ukrainian Cup to feature a team from a second-tier division.

If Inhulets won the cup, they would have qualified for the group stage of the 2019–20 UEFA Europa League, because Shakhtar had already qualified for the 2019–20 UEFA Champions League.

== Road to the final ==
Note: In all results below, the score of the finalist is given first (H: home; A: away).

Shakhtar Donetsk		Round	Inhulets Petrove
Opponent	Result	2018–19 Ukrainian Cup	Opponent	Result
bye		Preliminary round 2	Kolos Kovalivka	1–0 (H)
bye		Preliminary round 3	Myr Hornostayivka	3–0 (A)
Olimpik Donetsk	3–2 (H)	Round of 16	FC Mariupol	3–1 (H)
Dynamo Kyiv	1–1 (H) (a.e.t.), (4–3 p)	Quarter-finals	Karpaty Lviv	1–1 (H) (a.e.t.), (5–4 p)
SC Dnipro-1	2–0 (A)	Semi-finals	Zorya Luhansk	2–1 (H)

== Previous encounters ==
The game between Shakhtar and Inhulets was the first between the two teams. It was the 19th Cup Final for Shakhtar, the record for any team reaching the final stage. It was Shakhtar's ninth consecutive final since 2011. It was Inhulets' first time reaching the final stage. In addition, Inhulets became the first team from a second tier (Persha Liha) to reach the finals.

== Match ==
15 May 2019
21:00 LST

Shakhtar Donetsk	4–0	Inhulets Petrove
Tetê 27', 39'; Moraes 45+1'; Solomon 64'	Report

Slavutych Arena, Zaporizhzhia
Attendance: 11,100 (press-release) (9,500 (info database))
Referee: Yevhen Aranovskyi

Shakhtar Donetsk	Inhulets Petrove

Shakhtar Donetsk:
GK	1	(Ukraine) Oleksiy Shevchenko
DF	50	(Ukraine) Serhiy Bolbat
DF	4	(Ukraine) Serhiy Kryvtsov
DF	22	(Ukraine) Mykola Matviyenko
DF	31	(Brazil) Ismaily
MF	21	(Brazil) Alan Patrick
MF	88	(Brazil) Marcos Antônio
MF	14	(Brazil) Tetê	27', 39'	(substituted off) 72'
MF	74	(Ukraine) Viktor Kovalenko	(yellow card) 47'	(substituted off) 61'
MF	7	(Brazil) Taison (c)
FW	10	(Ukraine) Júnior Moraes	45+1'	(substituted off) 62'
Substitutes:
GK	30	(Ukraine) Andriy Pyatov
DF	5	(Georgia (country)) Davit Khocholava
MF	6	(Ukraine) Taras Stepanenko
MF	9	(Brazil) Dentinho
MF	19	(Israel) Manor Solomon	(substituted on) 61'	64'
MF	23	(Brazil) Wellington Nem	(substituted on) 72'	(yellow card) 89'
FW	8	(Nigeria) Olarenwaju Kayode	(substituted on) 62'
Coach:
(Portugal) Paulo Fonseca

Inhulets Petrove:
GK	1	(Ukraine) Anton Sytnykov
DF	39	(Ukraine) Denys Balan
DF	55	(Ukraine) Maksym Kovalyov
DF	28	(Ukraine) Vitaliy Pavlov
DF	89	(Ukraine) Oleh Synyohub
MF	80	(Ukraine) Vladyslav Lupashko (c)	(yellow card) 45+1'
MF	13	(Ukraine) Illya Kovalenko
MF	8	(Ukraine) Vladyslav Klymenko	(yellow card) 57'	(substituted off) 67'
MF	5	(Ukraine) Yevhen Zaporozhets
MF	45	(Ukraine) Artem Schedryi	(substituted off) 83'
FW	9	(Ukraine) Oleksandr Mishurenko	(substituted off) 34'
Substitutes:
GK	12	(Ukraine) Bohdan Shukhman
DF	23	(Ukraine) Oleksandr Kucherenko	(substituted on) 67'
DF	17	(Ukraine) Stanislav Peredystyi
MF	25	(Ukraine) Oleksandr Kozak	(substituted on) 83'
MF	7	(Ukraine) Dmytro Sula
MF	21	(Ukraine) Oleksandr Akymenko
FW	49	(Georgia (country)) Nika Sichinava	(substituted on) 34'
Coach:
(Ukraine) Serhiy Lavrynenko

MAN OF THE MATCH

MATCH OFFICIALS

- Assistant referees:
  - S.Prystupa (Kyiv)
  - Ye.Petrakov (Kyiv)
- Fourth official:
  - M.Kozyriatskyi (Zaporizhzhia)
- Reserved assistant referee:
  - V.Vysotskyi (Zaporizhzhia)
- Supervisor of refereeing:
  - A.Shandor (Lviv)

MATCH RULES

- 90 minutes.
- 30 minutes of extra-time if necessary.
- Penalty shoot-out if scores still level.
- Seven named substitutes.
- Maximum of 3 substitutions.

== See also ==
- 2018–19 Ukrainian Premier League
