= Yehor Yarmolyuk =

Ukrainian footballer (born 2004)

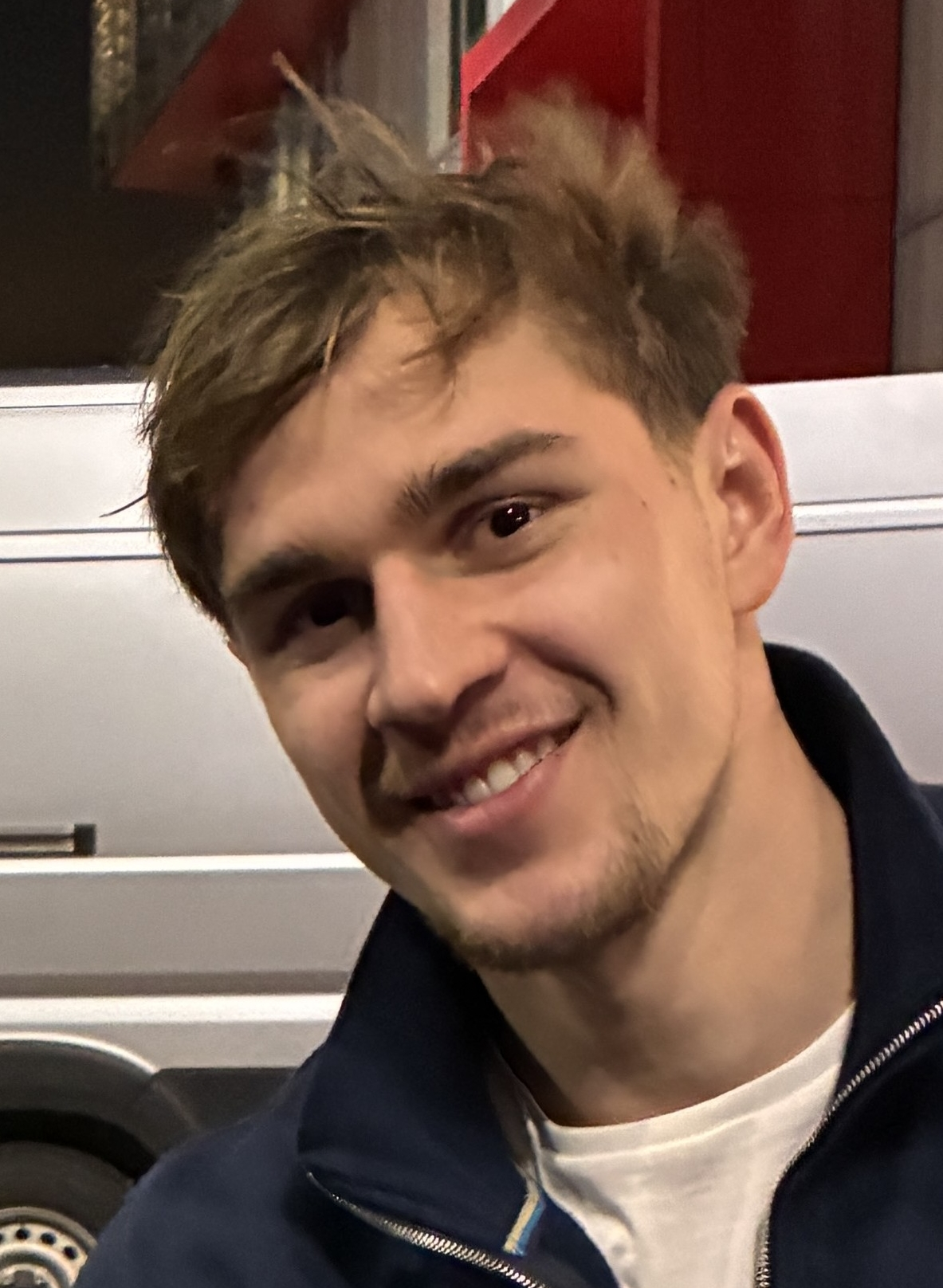
- Yarmolyuk after a Brentford match in 2025

Personal information
- Full name: Yehor Romanovych Yarmolyuk
- Date of birth: 1 March 2004 (age 22)
- Place of birth: Verkhniodniprovsk, Ukraine
- Height: 1.83 m (6 ft 0 in)
- Position: Central midfielder

Team information
- Current team: Brentford
- Number: 6

Youth career
- 2014–2016: Stal Kamianske
- 2016–2018: Dnipro
- 2018–2020: Dnipro-1

Senior career*
| Years | Team | Apps | (Gls) |
| 2020–2022 | Dnipro-1 | 18 | (0) |
| 2022– | Brentford | 101 | (2) |

International career^{‡}
- Ukraine U15
| 2019–2020 | Ukraine U16 | 4 | (0) |
| 2021–2022 | Ukraine U19 | 8 | (6) |
| 2020–2025 | Ukraine U21 | 17 | (1) |
| 2024 | Ukraine U23 | 4 | (1) |
| 2025– | Ukraine | 11 | (0) |
- * Club domestic league appearances and goals as of 19:10, 10 October 2026 (UTC) ‡ National team caps and goals as of 15:30, 18 November 2026 (UTC)

Yehor Romanovych Yarmolyuk (Ukrainian: Єгор Романович Ярмолюк; born 1 March 2004; sometimes transliterated as Yarmoliuk) is a Ukrainian professional footballer who plays as a central midfielder for Premier League club Brentford and the Ukraine national team.

Yarmolyuk is a product of the Dnipro-1 academy and made his senior debut for the club in 2020. He transferred to Brentford in 2022. Yarmolyuk was capped by Ukraine at youth international level and made his senior debut in 2025.

== Club career ==
=== SC Dnipro-1 ===
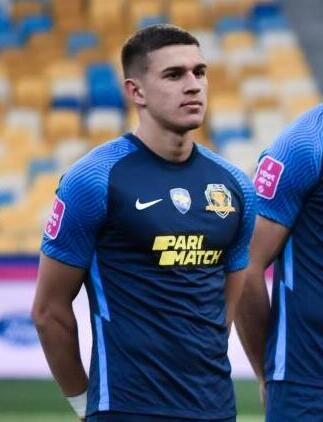
Yarmolyuk while with Dnipro-1 in 2021.

A central midfielder, Yarmolyuk is a product of a number of youth sportive schools of the Dnipropetrovsk Oblast and in May 2019, at age 15, he signed a three-year contract with Ukrainian Premier League club SC Dnipro-1. His progression was such that he made two first-team appearances late in the 2019–20 season. Yarmolyuk's second appearance made him the second youngest player to start a match in the history of the Ukrainian top flight, at the age of 16 years and 140 days. Yarmolyuk signed a new three-year contract in October 2020. He went on to make 19 further appearances during the 2020–21 and 2021–22 seasons, before the latter season was curtailed due to the Russian invasion of Ukraine. Yarmolyuk scored one senior goal for the club, in a 2–1 Ukrainian Cup round of 32 win over VPK-Ahro Shevchenkivka on 22 September 2021.

=== Brentford ===
==== 2022–23 season ====
On 14 July 2022, Yarmolyuk transferred to Premier League club Brentford and signed a three-year contract, with the option of a further year, for a fee reported to be €1.6 million. He began his Brentford career with the club's B team, but made two pre-season friendly substitute appearances for the first team. Following two Premier League matches as an unused substitute, Yarmolyuk made his senior debut for the club as a substitute during the second half of an EFL Cup third round shoot-out defeat to Gillingham on 8 November 2022. He was included in the first team squad for its mid-season training camp in Girona and made three friendly appearances during the period. Yarmolyuk made 16 B team appearances and scored three goals prior to missing much of the second half of the 2022–23 season with a torn hamstring.

==== 2023–24 season ====
Yarmolyuk was promoted into the first team squad in June 2023 and signed a new five-year contract, with the option of a further year. He returned fit for the 2023–24 pre-season and made his first appearance of the regular season with a start in a EFL Cup second round shoot-out win over Newport County on 29 August 2023. Following four substitute appearances in Premier League matches, injury to Mathias Jensen allowed Yarmolyuk to make his maiden Premier League start for the club in a 1–0 defeat to Arsenal on 25 November 2023. He made three further starts before the end of 2023 and Yarmolyuk's progress in the calendar year was recognised in the U19 category of the Golden talent of Ukraine award. Yarmolyuk ended the 2023–24 season with 30 appearances.

==== 2024–present ====
Yarmolyuk made a career-high 35 appearances during the 2024–25 season, 19 of them from the start. In May 2025, he signed a new six-year contract, with the option of a further year. Following the departure of long-time midfield stalwart Christian Nørgaard during the 2025 off-season, Yarmolyuk started in 33 of his 42 appearances during the 2025–26 season. He scored once, his first goal for the club, in a 3–0 victory over Sunderland on 7 January 2026.

== International career ==
=== Youth ===
Yarmolyuk has been capped by Ukraine at youth level and notably made his U21 debut at age 16. He was named in the 2025 UEFA European U21 Championship squad and appeared in each match prior to the team's group stage exit. Yarmolyuk was called into the U23 team's 2024 Maurice Revello Tournament squad and made four appearances in the tournament, scoring once. He converted a penalty in the shoot-out that decided the final versus Ivory Coast in Ukraine's favour.

=== Senior ===
On 16 May 2024, Yarmolyuk was named as a reserve in the senior Ukraine squad for a pre-Euro 2024 training camp and series of friendly matches. He was named in the senior squad for a pair of Nations League B group matches in November 2024 and remained an unused substitute in both. Yarmolyuk won his second call-up for the 2024–25 Nations League promotion playoffs and he appeared in both matches. He became a regular member of the squad during the 2025–26 season.

== Style of play ==
A central midfielder, Yarmolyuk can also "play as a number 6, 8 or even 10" and "is a very good pressing player and has a little bit of bite in his pressure, and his technical abilities are good in terms of passing". Former Brentford head coach Thomas Frank stated that Yarmolyuk is "one of the best trainers. He trains hard and with good intensity – that’s the best way to get into the team".

== Career statistics ==
=== Club ===
As of match played 10 October 2026

Appearances and goals by club, season and competition
| Club | Season | League | | | National cup (Note: Includes Ukrainian Cup, FA Cup) | | League cup (Note: Includes EFL Cup) | | Total | |
| Club | Season | Division | Apps | Goals | Apps | Goals | Apps | Goals | Apps | Goals |
|---|---|---|---|---|---|---|---|---|---|---|
| Dnipro-1 | 2019–20 | Ukrainian Premier League | 2 | 0 | 0 | 0 | — | | 2 | 0 |
| Dnipro-1 | 2020–21 | Ukrainian Premier League | 9 | 0 | 1 | 0 | — | | 10 | 0 |
| Dnipro-1 | 2021–22 | Ukrainian Premier League | 7 | 0 | 2 | 1 | — | | 9 | 1 |
| Dnipro-1 | Total | | 18 | 0 | 3 | 1 | — | | 21 | 1 |
| Brentford | 2022–23 | Premier League | 0 | 0 | 0 | 0 | 1 | 0 | 1 | 0 |
| Brentford | 2023–24 | Premier League | 27 | 0 | 2 | 0 | 1 | 0 | 30 | 0 |
| Brentford | 2024–25 | Premier League | 31 | 0 | 1 | 0 | 3 | 0 | 35 | 0 |
| Brentford | 2025–26 | Premier League | 37 | 1 | 2 | 0 | 3 | 0 | 42 | 1 |
| Brentford | 2026–27 | Premier League | 6 | 1 | 0 | 0 | 2 | 0 | 8 | 1 |
| Brentford | Total | | 101 | 2 | 5 | 0 | 10 | 0 | 116 | 2 |
| Career total | | | 119 | 2 | 8 | 1 | 10 | 0 | 137 | 3 |

=== International ===
As of match played 17 November 2026

Appearances and goals by national team and year
| National team | Year | Apps | Goals |
|---|---|---|---|
| Ukraine | 2025 | 7 | 0 |
| Ukraine | 2026 | 4 | 0 |
| Total | | 11 | 0 |

== Honours ==
Ukraine U15

- UEFA U15 Development Tournament: 2019

Ukraine U23

- Maurice Revello Tournament: 2024

Individual

- Ukrainian Association of Football Best U15 Attacker: 2019
- Golden talent of Ukraine: 2023 (U19), 2024 (U21)
