= Bohdan Shukhman =

Ukrainian footballer

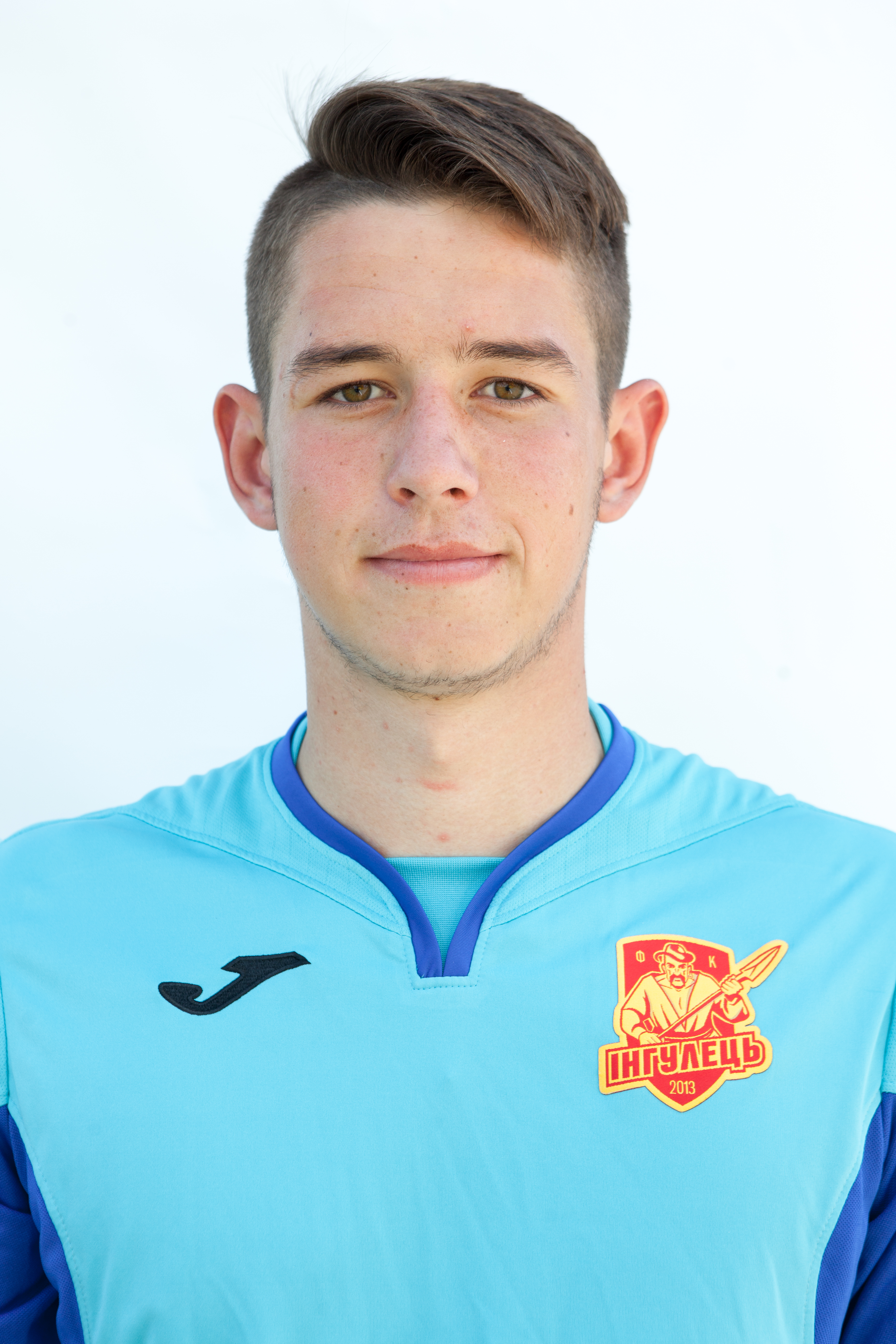

Personal information
- Full name: Bohdan Volodymyrovych Shukhman
- Date of birth: 8 April 2000 (age 26)
- Place of birth: Pinchuky, Kyiv Oblast, Ukraine
- Height: 1.90 m (6 ft 3 in)
- Position: Goalkeeper

Team information
- Current team: Hirnyk-Sport Horishni Plavni
- Number: 35

Youth career
- 2014: BVUFK Brovary
- 2014–2017: Knyazha Shchaslyve
- 2017–2018: Lyubomyr Stavyshche

Senior career*
| Years | Team | Apps | (Gls) |
| 2018–2020 | Inhulets Petrove | 1 | (0) |
| 2018–2019 | → Inhulets-2 Petrove | 0 | (0) |
| 2020–2022 | Podillya Khmelnytskyi | 1 | (0) |
| 2023 | Podillya Khmelnytskyi | 0 | (0) |
| 2023 | Nyva Vinnytsia | 1 | (0) |
| 2024– | Hirnyk-Sport Horishni Plavni | 7 | (0) |
- * Club domestic league appearances and goals as of 19 June 2024

Bohdan Volodymyrovych Shukhman (Ukrainian: Богдан Володимирович Шухман; born 8 April 2000) is a Ukrainian professional footballer who plays as a goalkeeper for Hirnyk-Sport Horishni Plavni.

== Career ==
=== Early years ===
Shukhman is a product of several sports schools from around Kyiv.

=== Inhulets Petrove ===
He made his professional debut on 1 May 2019 for a brief period of time in a home game against PFC Sumy that was struggling that season. Shukhman was listed as a substitute goalkeeper for Inhulets for since the 2018–19 Ukrainian First League season and also was on the roster for the 2019 Ukrainian Cup Final.
