= Giorgi Tsitaishvili =

Georgian footballer (born 2000)

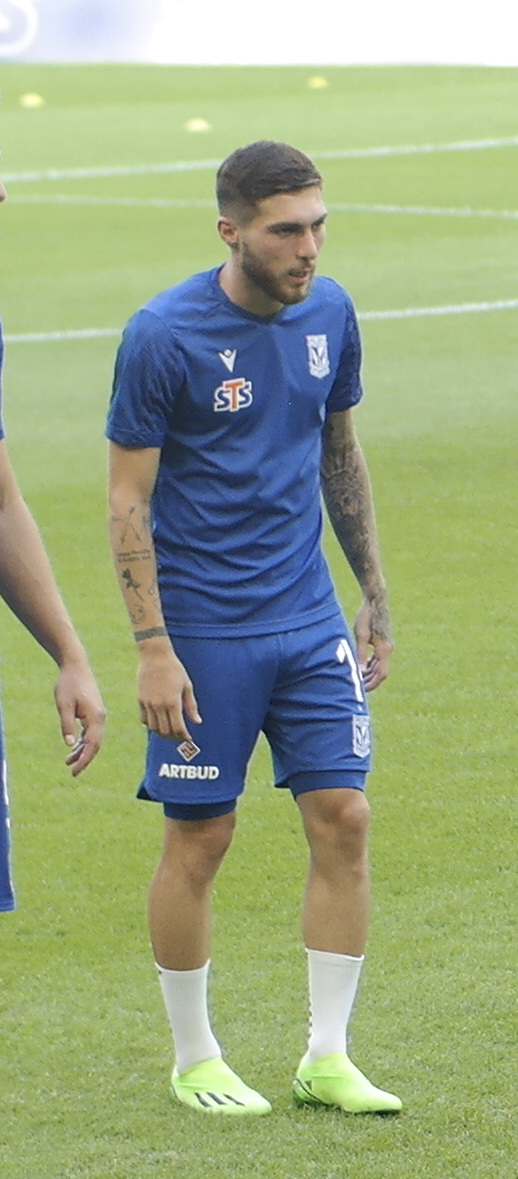
- Tsitaishvili with Lech Poznań in 2022

Personal information
- Date of birth: 18 November 2000 (age 25)
- Place of birth: Rishon LeZion, Israel
- Height: 1.71 m (5 ft 7 in)
- Position: Winger

Team information
- Current team: Rayo Vallecano
- Number: 14

Youth career
- 2012–2018: Dynamo Kyiv

Senior career*
Years	Team	Apps	(Gls)
2018–2026	Dynamo Kyiv	21	(0)
2021	→ Vorskla Poltava (loan)	4	(1)
2021–2022	→ Chornomorets Odesa (loan)	13	(1)
2022	→ Wisła Kraków (loan)	7	(1)
2022–2023	→ Lech Poznań (loan)	12	(1)
2022–2023	→ Lech Poznań II (loan)	5	(0)
2023–2024	→ Dinamo Batumi (loan)	34	(5)
2024–2025	→ Granada (loan)	36	(7)
2025–2026	→ Metz (loan)	33	(3)
2026–	Rayo Vallecano	5	(0)

International career^{‡}
2017	Ukraine U17	2	(0)
2018	Ukraine U18	2	(0)
2018–2019	Ukraine U19	12	(5)
2019	Ukraine U20	5	(1)
2019–2020	Ukraine U21	8	(2)
2023	Georgia U21	4	(1)
2021–	Georgia	34	(1)
Medal record
Men's football
Representing Ukraine
FIFA U-20 World Cup
Winner	2019 Poland
- * Club domestic league appearances and goals as of 16:03, 24 October 2026 (UTC) ‡ National team caps and goals as of 19:34, 14 November 2026 (UTC)

Giorgi Tsitaishvili (Order of Honor) (Ukrainian: Георгій Климентійович Цітаїшвілі, romanized: Heorhii Klymentiiovych Tsitaishvili; Georgian: გიორგი წიტაიშვილი; born 18 November 2000) is a professional footballer who plays as a winger for La Liga club Rayo Vallecano and the Georgia national team.

Born in Israel while his father Klimenti Tsitahshvili played professional football there, he was raised in Ukraine and is of Georgian descent. He represented Ukraine at youth international level before switching his allegiance to Georgia.

== Early life ==
Tsitaishvili was born in Rishon LeZion, Israel. At the time, his father, Klimenti Tsitaishvili, was a footballer playing for Hapoel Rishon LeZion. He grew up in Ukraine, but is of Georgian descent. He is a product of the Dynamo Kyiv youth sportive school.

== Club career ==
=== Dynamo Kyiv ===
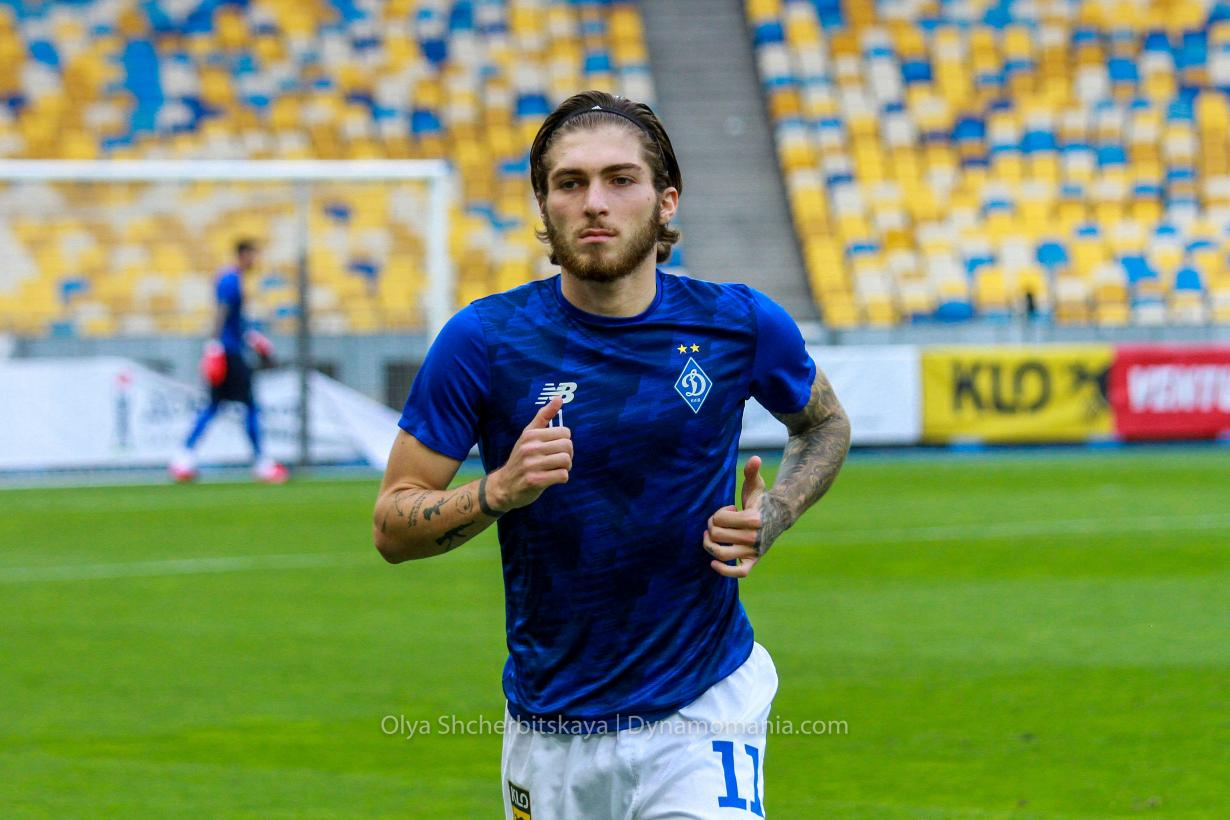
Tsitaishvili playing for Dynamo Kyiv in 2020

Tsitaishvili made his debut for Dynamo in the 2018 Ukrainian Cup Final on 9 May 2018, playing in a match against Shaktar Donetsk. The following season he made his European debut, when he came on as a substitute in Dynamo's 1–0 away loss to FK Jablonec in the UEFA Europa League.

==== Loan spells in Ukraine ====
On 20 December 2020, the manager of Vorskla Poltava, Yuriy Maksymov, announced that Tsitaishvili would be joining his club on a temporary basis.

In July 2021, he moved on loan to Chornomorets Odesa. On 25 July 2021, he made his league debut for Chornomorets in a 3–0 away loss against Desna Chernihiv at the Chernihiv Stadium.

==== Loan spells in Poland ====
On 7 March 2022, following the start of the Russian invasion of Ukraine, FIFA announced all the contracts of foreign players in Ukraine would be suspended until 30 June 2022 and they are allowed to sign with clubs outside Ukraine until 30 June 2022. On 6 April 2022, Tsitaishvili moved to Polish Ekstraklasa side Wisła Kraków on a loan until the end of the season. He appeared in seven league games, scoring one goal, before leaving the relegated team on 7 June 2022.

In late June, he left Dynamo's pre-season camp to return to Poland and join defending champions Lech Poznań on a one-year loan spell. On 9 July 2022, he made his competitive debut for Lech as a starter in a 2–0 Polish Super Cup loss against Raków Częstochowa.

==== Loan to Dinamo Batumi ====
In early July 2023, Erovnuli Liga club Dinamo Batumi announced signing Tsitaishvili on a year-long loan deal. He made a debut with Dinamo in a UEFA Europa Conference League game against Tirana on 13 July 2023. Later the same year, the player won the league title with this club.

==== Loan to Granada ====
On 26 July 2024, Tsitaishvili joined Spanish Segunda División side Granada on a one-year loan deal. On 15 August, he took part in an opening match of the season against Albacete.

On 29 September 2024, Tsitaishvili scored his first Spanish goal in a 2–2 draw against Burgos.

==== Loan to Metz ====
On 11 July 2025, Tsitaishvili joined French Ligue 1 club Metz on loan.

=== Rayo Vallecano ===
On 12 August 2026, Tsitaishvili joined Spanish La Liga side Rayo Vallecano on a permanent transfer.

== International career ==
Tsitaishvili was part of the Ukraine national under-20 football team that won the 2019 FIFA U-20 World Cup. He played in five of his team's seven matches in the tournament, and scored a goal in the final against South Korea.

At senior level, he switched his allegiance to Georgia. He made his debut for the Georgia national team on 2 September 2021 in a World Cup qualifier against Kosovo, starting and playing the full match in a 1–0 home loss.

On 26 September 2022, Tsitaishvili scored for the first time for the team in a UEFA Nations League match against Gibraltar to make it 2–0.

Tsitaishvili participated in all four matches of the 2023 European U21 Championship, co-hosted by Georgia. He came off the bench and scored after six minutes against Belgium in a dramatic 2–2 draw.

Tsitaishvili also took part in both of Georgia's UEFA Euro 2024 qualifying play-off, helping the team qualify for their first major competition. Two months later, he received a call-up for Georgia's squad for the final tournament.

== Career statistics ==
=== Club ===
As of match played 24 October 2026

Appearances and goals by club, season and competition
Club	Season	League			National cup (Note: Includes Ukrainian Cup, Polish Cup, Georgian Cup, Copa del Rey)		Continental		Other		Total	
Club	Season	League	Apps	Goals	Apps	Goals	Apps	Goals	Apps	Goals	Apps	Goals
Dynamo Kyiv	2017–18	Ukrainian Premier League	0	0	1	0	0	0	0	0	1	0
Dynamo Kyiv	2018–19	Ukrainian Premier League	5	0	0	0	1 (Note: Appearance(s) in UEFA Europa League)	0	0	0	6	0
Dynamo Kyiv	2019–20	Ukrainian Premier League	10	0	1	0	1	0	1 (Note: Appearance in Ukrainian Super Cup)	0	13	0
Dynamo Kyiv	2020–21	Ukrainian Premier League	4	0	0	0	0	0	0	0	4	0
Dynamo Kyiv	Total		19	0	2	0	2	0	1	0	24	0
Vorskla Poltava (loan)	2020–21	Ukrainian Premier League	4	1	0	0	—		0	0	4	1
Chornomorets Odesa (loan)	2021–22	Ukrainian Premier League	13	1	2	0	—		0	0	15	1
Wisła Kraków (loan)	2021–22	Ekstraklasa	7	1	0	0	—		—		7	1
Lech Poznań (loan)	2022–23	Ekstraklasa	12	1	1	0	10 (Note: One appearance in UEFA Champions League, nine appearances in UEFA Europa Conference League)	0	1 (Note: Appearance in Polish Super Cup)	0	24	1
Lech Poznań II (loan)	2022–23	II liga	5	0	0	0	—		—		5	0
Dinamo Batumi (loan)	2023	Erovnuli Liga	17	4	2	1	2 (Note: Appearances in UEFA Europa Conference League)	0	0	0	21	5
Dinamo Batumi (loan)	2024	Erovnuli Liga	17	1	0	0	0	0	0	0	17	1
Dinamo Batumi (loan)	Total		34	5	2	1	2	0	0	0	38	6
Granada (loan)	2024–25	Segunda División	36	7	2	0	—		—		38	7
Metz (loan)	2025–26	Ligue 1	33	3	1	0	—		—		34	3
Rayo Vallecano	2026–27	La Liga	5	0	0	0	—		—		5	0
Career total			168	19	10	1	14	0	2	0	194	20

=== International ===
As of match played 14 November 2026

Appearances and goals by national team and year
National team	Year	Apps	Goals
Georgia	2021	2	0
Georgia	2022	11	1
Georgia	2023	1	0
Georgia	2024	9	0
Georgia	2025	5	0
Georgia	2026	6	0
Total		34	1

Scores and results list Georgia's goal tally first, score column indicates score after each Tsitaishvili goal.

List of international goals scored by Giorgi Tsitaishvili
No.	Date	Venue	Opponent	Score	Result	Competition
1	26 September 2022	Victoria Stadium, Gibraltar	Gibraltar	2–0	2–1	2022–23 UEFA Nations League

== Honours ==
Dynamo Kyiv

- Ukrainian Cup: 2019–20
- Ukrainian Super Cup: 2019, 2020

Dynamo Kyiv U19

- Under-19 Ukrainian Premier League: 2018–19, 2019–20, 2020–21

Dinamo Batumi

- Erovnuli Liga: 2023

Ukraine U20

- FIFA U-20 World Cup: 2019

Individual

- Top Golden talent: 2019 (U-19)
