= Vladyslav Supryaha =

Ukrainian footballer

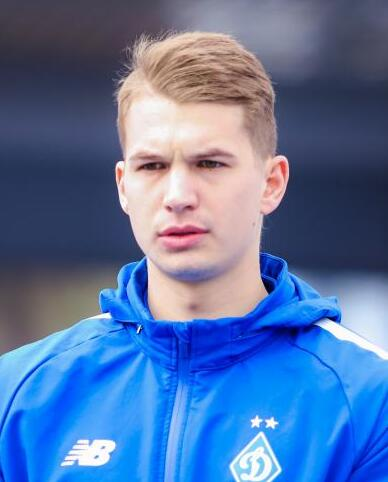

Personal information
- Full name: Vladyslav Serhiyovych Supryaha
- Date of birth: 15 February 2000 (age 26)
- Place of birth: Sarata, Ukraine
- Height: 1.82 m (6 ft 0 in)
- Position: Forward

Team information
- Current team: Epitsentr Kamianets-Podilskyi (loan)
- Number: 21

Youth career
- 2013: Dnipro Dnipropetrovsk
- 2013–2014: DYuSSh Sarata
- 2014–2017: Dnipro

Senior career*
Years	Team	Apps	(Gls)
2016–2017	Dnipro	0	(0)
2017–2018	Dnipro-1	22	(7)
2018–	Dynamo Kyiv	36	(2)
2019–2020	→ Dnipro-1 (loan)	25	(14)
2022	→ Sampdoria (loan)	1	(0)
2024–2025	→ Zorya Luhansk (loan)	9	(0)
2025–2026	→ Epitsentr Kamianets-Podilskyi (loan)	22	(3)

International career^{‡}
2016	Ukraine U16	1	(0)
2016–2017	Ukraine U17	9	(1)
2017–2019	Ukraine U19	20	(5)
2018–2019	Ukraine U20	8	(2)
2019–2022	Ukraine U21	15	(1)
Medal record
Men's football
Representing Ukraine
UEFA European Under-19 Championship
Bronze medal – third place	2018 Finland
FIFA U-20 World Cup
Winner	2019 Poland
- * Club domestic league appearances and goals as of 3 June 2026 ‡ National team caps and goals as of 21 August 2022

Vladyslav Serhiyovych Supryaha (Ukrainian: Владисла́в Сергі́йович Супря́га; born 15 February 2000) is a Ukrainian professional footballer who plays as a forward for Ukrainian club Epitsentr Kamianets-Podilskyi on loan from Dynamo Kyiv.

== Club career ==
=== Dnipro and Dnipro-1 ===
Supryaha is a product of Dnipro youth teams, and started making bench appearances for the senior squad in the 2016–17 season. Following the relegation of Dnipro into the third tier after the 2016–17 season due to financial irregularities, he switched to Dnipro-1. He made his Ukrainian Second League debut for Dnipro-1 on 15 July 2017, in a game against Metalist 1925 Kharkiv as a 61st-minute substitute for Vladyslav Voytsekhovskyi.

=== Dynamo Kyiv ===
On 10 August 2018, Supryaha signed a five-year contract with the Ukrainian Premier League club Dynamo Kyiv. He made his league debut for Dynamo Kyiv on 25 August 2018, in a game against Chornomorets Odesa as an 82nd-minute substitute for Nazariy Rusyn. He started the next Dynamo's game, a Champions League play-off return leg against Ajax on 28 August.

==== Loan to Sampdoria ====
On 30 January 2022, Supryaha was sent on loan to Sampdoria in the Serie A. On 6 February 2022, he made his home debut with the new club against Sassuolo in the 2021–22 season, replacing Manolo Gabbiadini in the 36th minute.

==== Loan to Zorya Luhansk ====
On 6 September 2024, Supryaha moved on loan to Zorya Luhansk.

== International career ==
Supryaha represented Ukraine U17 at the 2017 UEFA European Under-17 Championship, Ukraine did not advance out of the group.

At the 2018 UEFA European Under-19 Championship, Ukraine U19 advanced to the semifinal. Despite only scoring once, Supryaha was selected for team of the tournament at the central forward position. In the 2019 FIFA U-20 World Cup, Ukraine won their first-ever FIFA tournament title; Supryaha scored twice in the final en route to a 3–1 victory over South Korea.

== Career statistics ==
As of match played 10 September 2026

Appearances and goals by club, season and competition
Club	Season	League			National Cup		Continental		Other		Total	
Club	Season	Division	Apps	Goals	Apps	Goals	Apps	Goals	Apps	Goals	Apps	Goals
Dnipro	2016–17	Ukrainian Premier League	0	0	0	0	—		—		0	0
Dnipro-1	2017–18	Ukrainian Second League	22	7	6	0	—		—		28	7
Dynamo Kyiv	2018–19	Ukrainian Premier League	6	0	1	0	3 (Note: One appearance in UEFA Champions League, two appearances in UEFA Europa League)	0	0	0	10	0
Dynamo Kyiv	2020–21	Ukrainian Premier League	17	2	2	0	11 (Note: Nine appearances and one goal in UEFA Champions League, two appearances in UEFA Europa League)	1	1 (Note: Appearance(s) in Ukrainian Super Cup)	0	31	3
Dynamo Kyiv	2021–22	Ukrainian Premier League	3	0	0	0	2 (Note: Appearance(s) in UEFA Champions League)	0	1	0	6	0
Dynamo Kyiv	2023–24	Ukrainian Premier League	8	0	0	0	—		—		8	0
Dynamo Kyiv	2024–25	Ukrainian Premier League	2	0	0	0	3	0	—		5	0
Dynamo Kyiv	2025–26	Ukrainian Premier League	0	0	0	0	1	0	—		1	0
Dynamo Kyiv	2026–27	Ukrainian Premier League	0	0	1	0	0	0	—		1	0
Dynamo Kyiv	Total		36	2	4	0	20	1	2	0	62	3
Dnipro-1 (loan)	2019–20	Ukrainian Premier League	25	14	2	0	—		—		27	14
Sampdoria (loan)	2021–22	Serie A	1	0	0	0	—		—		1	0
Zorya Luhansk (loan)	2024–25	Ukrainian Premier League	9	0	1	0	—		—		10	0
Epitsentr Kamianets-Podilskyi (loan)	2025–26	Ukrainian Premier League	22	3	1	0	—		—		23	3
Career total			115	26	14	0	20	1	2	0	151	27

== Honours ==
Dynamo Kyiv

- Ukrainian Premier League: 2020–21
- Ukrainian Cup: 2020–21
- Ukrainian Super Cup: 2020

Ukraine U20

- FIFA U-20 World Cup: 2019

Individual

- UEFA European Under-19 Championship Team of the Tournament: 2018
- Ukrainian Premier League Best young player: 2019–20
- Ukrainian Premier League player of the Month: 2019–20 (February)
