= Valeriy Luchkevych =

Ukrainian footballer

Personal information
- Full name: Valeriy Ihorovych Luchkevych
- Date of birth: 11 January 1996 (age 30)
- Place of birth: Zaporizhzhia, Ukraine
- Height: 1.76 m (5 ft 9 in)
- Position: Midfielder

Team information
- Current team: Epitsentr Kamianets-Podilskyi
- Number: 67

Youth career
- 2009–2012: Metalurh Zaporizhzhia

Senior career*
| Years | Team | Apps | (Gls) |
| 2012–2013 | Metalurh Zaporizhzhia | 0 | (0) |
| 2013–2017 | Dnipro | 43 | (5) |
| 2017–2019 | Standard Liège | 21 | (1) |
| 2019 | → Oleksandriya (loan) | 13 | (2) |
| 2019–2021 | Oleksandriya | 51 | (3) |
| 2021–2023 | Dnipro-1 | 15 | (0) |
| 2023–2024 | Kolos Kovalivka | 25 | (2) |
| 2025 | Dynamo Kyiv | 2 | (0) |
| 2026– | Epitsentr Kamianets-Podilskyi | 7 | (0) |

International career^{‡}
| 2012–2013 | Ukraine U17 | 14 | (2) |
| 2013–2014 | Ukraine U18 | 15 | (1) |
| 2014–2015 | Ukraine U19 | 10 | (2) |
| 2015 | Ukraine U20 | 5 | (2) |
| 2015–2018 | Ukraine U21 | 19 | (0) |
- * Club domestic league appearances and goals as of 3 June 2026 ‡ National team caps and goals as of 6 October 2021

Valeriy Ihorovych Luchkevych (Ukrainian: Валерій Ігорович Лучкевич; born 11 January 1996) is a Ukrainian professional footballer who plays as a midfielder, who plays for Ukrainian Premier League club Epitsentr Kamianets-Podilskyi.

== Career ==
Luchkevych is a son of Ukrainian international player and current coach Ihor Luchkevych and product of FC Metalurh Zaporizhya youth sportive school system. In December 2013 he signed a contract with FC Dnipro Dnipropetrovsk. He made his debut for FC Dnipro in the match against FC Karpaty Lviv on 10 August 2014 in the Ukrainian Premier League.

On 30 January 2017, Luchkevych signed for Belgian club Standard Liège. On 12 March 2017, he made his debut for the club coming on as a substitute in a 55th minute in a Belgian First Division A match against Oostende. On 13 May 2017, he scored the first goal for his club in a Europa League play-off match of Belgian First Division A against Mechelen.

== Career statistics ==
=== Club ===
As of 24 July 2017

| Club | Season | League | | | National Cup | | Continental | | Other | | Total | |
| Club | Season | Division | Apps | Goals | Apps | Goals | Apps | Goals | Apps | Goals | Apps | Goals |
|---|---|---|---|---|---|---|---|---|---|---|---|---|
| Dnipro | 2014–15 | Ukrainian Premier League | 13 | 2 | 6 | 0 | 8 | 0 | — | | 27 | 2 |
| Dnipro | 2015–16 | Ukrainian Premier League | 20 | 1 | 7 | 1 | 3 | 0 | — | | 30 | 2 |
| Dnipro | 2016–17 | Ukrainian Premier League | 10 | 2 | 1 | 0 | 0 | 0 | — | | 11 | 2 |
| Dnipro | Total | | 43 | 5 | 14 | 1 | 11 | 0 | — | | 68 | 6 |
| Standard Liège | 2016–17 | Belgian First Division A | 10 | 1 | 0 | 0 | 0 | 0 | 0 | 0 | 10 | 1 |
| Standard Liège | 2017–18 | Belgian First Division A | 11 | 0 | 4 | 0 | 0 | 0 | 0 | 0 | 15 | 0 |
| Standard Liège | Total | | 21 | 1 | 4 | 0 | 0 | 0 | 0 | 0 | 25 | 1 |
| Career total | | | 64 | 6 | 18 | 1 | 11 | 0 | 0 | 0 | 93 | 7 |

== Honors ==
Dnipro Dnipropetrovsk

- UEFA Europa League runner-up: 2014–15

Individual

- Golden talent of Ukraine: 2014 (U19)
