= Yevheniy Pastukh =

Ukrainian footballer

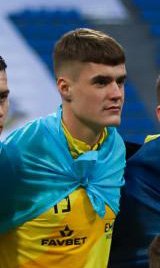
- Yevheniy Pastukh with Rukh Lviv in 2023

Personal information
- Full name: Yevheniy Oleksandrovych Pastukh
- Date of birth: 19 March 2004 (age 22)
- Place of birth: Zhytomyr, Ukraine
- Height: 1.95 m (6 ft 5 in)
- Position: Striker

Team information
- Current team: LNZ Cherkasy
- Number: 19

Youth career
- 200?–2012: Feniks Zhytomyr
- 2012–2017: Dynamo Kyiv
- 2017–2019: Karpaty Lviv
- 2019–2020: Shakhtar Donetsk
- 2020–2021: Dynamo Kyiv

Senior career*
Years	Team	Apps	(Gls)
2021–2025	Rukh Lviv	36	(4)
2025	Karpaty Lviv	0	(0)
2025	→ Rukh Lviv (loan)	18	(1)
2025–	LNZ Cherkasy	26	(1)

International career^{‡}
2022	Ukraine U19	3	(0)
2024–	Ukraine U21	1	(0)
- * Club domestic league appearances and goals as of 3 June 2026 ‡ National team caps and goals as of 4 October 2025

Yevheniy Oleksandrovych Pastukh (Ukrainian: Євгеній Олександрович Пастух; born 19 March 2004) is a Ukrainian professional footballer who plays as a striker for LNZ Cherkasy.

== Career ==
=== Early years ===
Born in Zhytomyr, Pastukh began his career in the local Feniks academy, where he was trained until the age of 8, and then continued in the Dynamo Kyiv, Karpaty Lviv and the Shakhtar Donetsk academies.

=== Rukh Lviv ===
In July 2021 he signed a contract with the Ukrainian Premier League side Rukh Lviv, but only played in the Ukrainian Premier League Reserves and made his debut in the Ukrainian Premier League as a second half-time substuituted player in a home winning match against Zorya Luhansk on 29 July 2023.

== Honours ==
Individual

- Ukraine Premier League Player of the Round: 2025–26 (Round 12),
