= 2026–27 FC Dynamo Kyiv season =

FC Dynamo Kyiv
2026–27 season
- President: Ihor Surkis
- Head coach: Ihor Kostyuk (until 18 October); Maciej Kędziorek (Acting Head Coach) (from 18 October)
- Stadium: Valeriy Lobanovskyi Stadium (League); Arena Lublin (Europe)
- Premier League: 3rd
- Ukrainian Cup: Pre-season
- UEFA Europa League: Second qualifying round vs PAOK
- UEFA Conference League: Third qualifying round vs Qarabağ
- Top goalscorer: League: Matviy Ponomarenko (5); All: Matviy Ponomarenko (6)
| Home colours | Away colours |

The 2026–27 season was the 100th season in the history of FC Dynamo Kyiv, and the club's 36th consecutive season in the Ukrainian Premier League. In addition to the domestic league, the club will participate in the Ukrainian Cup and the UEFA Conference League after dropping out of the UEFA Europa League.

== Season events ==
On 10 June, Dynamo announced that Oleksandr Karavayev had left the club at the end of his contract.

On 13 June, Dynamo announced the signing of Illia Olkhovyi from Nyva Ternopil.

On 19 June, Dynamo announced that Oleksandr Yatsyk had left the club at the end of his contract. Later the same day, Dynamo announced the return of Tomasz Kędziora to the club, with Kędziora signing a two-year contract from PAOK.

On 20 June, Dynamo announced that Maksym Braharu had signed permanently for Polissya Zhytomyr, having spent the previous season on loan at the club.

On 24 June, Dynamo announced the signing of Pierre Mounguengue from Paris Saint-Germain, to a three-year contract.

On 30 June, Dynamo announced that Denys Ignatenko had left the club at the end of his contract.

On 1 July, Dynamo announced that Valentyn Morgun had left the club at the end of his contract.

On 10 July, Dynamo announced that Maksym Dyachuk had joined Baník Ostrava on loan for the season.

On 14 July, Dynamo announced that Anton Tsarenko had joined Blau-Weiß Linz on loan for the season.

On 21 July, Dynamo announced the signing of Oleksiy Sych from Karpaty Lviv, to a three-year contract with the option of an additional year.

On 23 July, Dynamo announced that Matviy Ponomarenko had extended his contract with the club until the summer of 2031.

On 8 August, Dynamo announced that Ángel Torres had joined Operário Ferroviário on loan until 30 June 2027.

On 29 August, Dynamo announced that Vladislav Blănuță had left the club to join Lechia Gdańsk.

On 3 September, Dynamo announced the signing of Keasse Bah from Stade Lausanne Ouchy, to a five-year contract.

On 4 September, Dynamo announced the return to the club of Heorhiy Bushchan, on loan from Polissya Zhytomyr for the season, and the season-long loan signing of Gustavo Prado from Internacional.

On 7 October, Dynamo announced that they had extended their contract with Ruslan Neshcheret until the summer of 2031.

On 18 October, following a 3-1 defeat to Polissya Zhytomyr, Head Coach Ihor Kostyuk was fired with Maciej Kędziorek being placed in temporary charge.

On 22 October, Dynamo announced that they had extended their contract with Mykola Mykhaylenko until the summer of 30 June 2029.

== Squad ==
As of match played 8 November 2026

| Number | Player | Nationality | Position | Date of birth (age) | Signed from | Signed in | Contract ends | Apps. | Goals |
Goalkeepers
| 1 | Heorhiy Bushchan | (Ukraine) | GK | 31 May 1994 (age 32) | on loan from Polissya Zhytomyr | 2026 | 2027 | 185 | 0 |
| 35 | Ruslan Neshcheret | (Ukraine) | GK | 22 January 2002 (age 24) | Academy | 2019 | 2031 | 85 | 0 |
| 43 | Illia Olkhovyi | (Ukraine) | GK | 30 May 2003 (age 23) | Nyva Ternopil | 2026 | | 2 | 0 |
| 71 | Viacheslav Surkis | (Ukraine) | GK | 27 February 2006 (age 20) | Academy | 2025 | | 8 | 0 |
| | Artem Somka | (Ukraine) | GK | 29 July 2007 (age 19) | Academy | 2025 | | 0 | 0 |
Defenders
| 2 | Kostyantyn Vivcharenko | (Ukraine) | DF | 10 June 2002 (age 24) | Academy | 2018 | 2028 | 99 | 4 |
| 4 | Denys Popov | (Ukraine) | DF | 17 February 1999 (age 27) | Academy | 2017 | 2030 | 153 | 14 |
| 5 | Oleksiy Sych | (Ukraine) | DF | 1 April 2001 (age 25) | Karpaty Lviv | 2026 | 2029(+1) | 14 | 0 |
| 13 | Maksym Korobov | (Ukraine) | DF | 6 March 2006 (age 20) | Academy | 2025 | | 11 | 0 |
| 18 | Oleksandr Tymchyk | (Ukraine) | DF | 20 January 1997 (age 29) | Academy | 2014 | 2028 | 129 | 5 |
| 32 | Taras Mykhavko | (Ukraine) | DF | 30 May 2005 (age 21) | Lviv | 2023 | 2030 | 91 | 6 |
| 34 | Vladyslav Zakharchenko | (Ukraine) | DF | 16 June 2006 (age 20) | Academy | 2025 | | 16 | 0 |
| 40 | Kristian Bilovar | (Ukraine) | DF | 5 February 2001 (age 25) | Academy | 2021 | | 61 | 0 |
| 44 | Vladyslav Dubinchak | (Ukraine) | DF | 1 July 1998 (age 28) | Academy | 2016 | 2028 | 120 | 1 |
| 66 | Aliou Thiaré | (Senegal) | DF | 20 December 2003 (age 22) | Le Havre | 2025 | 2029 | 21 | 2 |
| 90 | Denys Dykyi | (Ukraine) | DF | 4 September 2006 (age 20) | Academy | 2026 | | 1 | 0 |
| 94 | Tomasz Kędziora | (Poland) | DF | 11 June 1994 (age 32) | PAOK | 2026 | 2028 | 213 | 7 |
| | Oleksandr Syrota | (Ukraine) | DF | 11 June 2000 (age 26) | Academy | 2019 | | 85 | 2 |
Midfielders
| 6 | Volodymyr Brazhko | (Ukraine) | MF | 23 January 2002 (age 24) | Academy | 2019 | | 110 | 17 |
| 7 | Andriy Yarmolenko | (Ukraine) | MF | 23 October 1989 (age 37) | Al Ain | 2023 | 2027 | 433 | 169 |
| 8 | Oleksandr Pikhalyonok | (Ukraine) | MF | 7 May 1997 (age 29) | Dnipro-1 | 2024 | 2029 | 83 | 11 |
| 9 | Nazar Voloshyn | (Ukraine) | MF | 17 June 2003 (age 23) | Academy | 2020 | 2028 | 133 | 18 |
| 10 | Mykola Shaparenko | (Ukraine) | MF | 4 October 1998 (age 28) | Illichivets Mariupol | 2017 | 2030 | 250 | 32 |
| 14 | Pavlo Lyusin | (Ukraine) | MF | 23 February 2008 (age 18) | Academy | 2026 | | 1 | 0 |
| 15 | Valentyn Rubchynskyi | (Ukraine) | MF | 15 February 2002 (age 24) | Dnipro-1 | 2024 | 2028 | 47 | 3 |
| 16 | Shola Ogundana | (Nigeria) | MF | 22 February 2005 (age 21) | Flamengo | 2025 | 2029 | 30 | 2 |
| 17 | Roman Salenko | (Ukraine) | MF | 18 May 2005 (age 21) | Dinaz Vyshhorod | 2022 | | 4 | 0 |
| 21 | Justin Lonwijk | (Suriname) | MF | 21 December 1999 (age 26) | Viborg FF | 2022 | 2027 | 38 | 3 |
| 22 | Vladyslav Kabayev | (Ukraine) | MF | 1 September 1995 (age 31) | Zorya Luhansk | 2022 | 2028 | 130 | 11 |
| 23 | Navin Malysh | (Ukraine) | MF | 27 July 2003 (age 23) | Academy | 2023 | | 13 | 0 |
| 29 | Vitaliy Buyalskyi | (Ukraine) | MF | 6 January 1993 (age 33) | Academy | 2010 | 2027 | 398 | 86 |
| 42 | Keasse Bah | (Ivory Coast) | MF | 17 December 2004 (age 21) | Stade Lausanne Ouchy | 2026 | 2031 | 6 | 0 |
| 47 | Gustavo Prado | (Brazil) | MF | 6 June 2005 (age 21) | on loan from Internacional | 2026 | 2027 | 1 | 0 |
| 91 | Mykola Mykhaylenko | (Ukraine) | MF | 22 May 2001 (age 25) | Academy | 2021 | 2029 | 65 | 4 |
| | Reshat Ramadani | (North Macedonia) | MF | 30 June 2003 (age 23) | Shkëndija | 2023 | | 4 | 0 |
| | Samba Diallo | (Senegal) | MF | 5 January 2003 (age 23) | AF Darou Salam | 2021 | | 17 | 1 |
Forwards
| 11 | Matviy Ponomarenko | (Ukraine) | FW | 11 January 2006 (age 20) | Academy | 2022 | 2031 | 48 | 25 |
| 19 | Vitaliy Lobko | (Ukraine) | FW | 11 August 2006 (age 20) | Academy | 2025 | | 1 | 0 |
| 20 | Vladyslav Supryaha | (Ukraine) | FW | 15 February 2000 (age 26) | Dnipro-1 | 2018 | | 61 | 3 |
| 39 | Eduardo Guerrero | (Panama) | FW | 21 February 2000 (age 26) | Zorya Luhansk | 2024 | 2029 | 69 | 10 |
| 70 | Bohdan Redushko | (Ukraine) | FW | 7 January 2007 (age 19) | Academy | 2025 | 2030 | 22 | 2 |
| 99 | Pierre Mounguengue | (France) | FW | 3 January 2008 (age 18) | Paris Saint-Germain | 2026 | 2029 | 6 | 0 |
Away on loan
| | Maksym Dyachuk | (Ukraine) | DF | 21 July 2003 (age 23) | Academy | 2020 | | 48 | 1 |
| | Ángel Torres | (Colombia) | MF | 6 April 2000 (age 26) | Unattached | 2025 | 2028 | 2 | 0 |
| | Oleksiy Husyev | (Ukraine) | DF | 16 March 2005 (age 21) | Academy | 2024 | | 0 | 0 |
| | Anton Tsarenko | (Ukraine) | MF | 17 June 2004 (age 22) | Academy | 2022 | | 21 | 2 |
| | Vladyslav Herych | (Ukraine) | FW | 7 November 2005 (age 21) | Academy | 2025 | | 0 | 0 |
Players who left during the season
| 77 | Vladislav Blănuță | (Romania) | FW | 12 January 2002 (age 24) | U Craiova | 2024 | 2030 | 10 | 1 |
| | Eric Ramírez | (Venezuela) | FW | 20 November 1998 (age 27) | DAC 1904 | 2021 | | 20 | 4 |

== Transfers ==
=== In ===
| Date | Position | Nationality | Name | From | Fee | Ref. |
|---|---|---|---|---|---|---|
| 13 June 2026 | GK | (Ukraine) | Illia Olkhovyi | Nyva Ternopil | Undisclosed | |
| 19 June 2026 | DF | (Poland) | Tomasz Kędziora | PAOK | Undisclosed | |
| 24 June 2026 | FW | (France) | Pierre Mounguengue | Paris Saint-Germain | Undisclosed | |
| 21 July 2026 | DF | (Ukraine) | Oleksiy Sych | Karpaty Lviv | Undisclosed | |
| 3 September 2026 | MF | (Ivory Coast) | Keasse Bah | Stade Lausanne Ouchy | Undisclosed | |

=== Loans in ===
| Date from | Position | Nationality | Name | From | Date to | Ref. |
|---|---|---|---|---|---|---|
| 4 September 2026 | GK | (Ukraine) | Heorhiy Bushchan | Polissya Zhytomyr | End of Season | |
| 4 September 2026 | MF | (Brazil) | Gustavo Prado | Internacional | End of Season | |

=== Out ===
| Date | Position | Nationality | Name | To | Fee | Ref. |
|---|---|---|---|---|---|---|
| 20 June 2026 | MF | (Ukraine) | Maksym Braharu | Polissya Zhytomyr | Undisclosed | |
| 26 August 2026 | FW | (Venezuela) | Eric Ramírez | Carabobo | Undisclosed | |
| 29 August 2026 | FW | (Romania) | Vladislav Blănuță | Lechia Gdańsk | Undisclosed | |

=== Loans out ===
| Date from | Position | Nationality | Name | To | Date to | Ref. |
|---|---|---|---|---|---|---|
| 10 July 2026 | DF | (Ukraine) | Maksym Dyachuk | Baník Ostrava | 30 June 2027 | |
| 14 July 2026 | MF | (Ukraine) | Anton Tsarenko | Blau-Weiß Linz | 30 June 2027 | |
| 8 August 2026 | MF | (Colombia) | Ángel Torres | Operário Ferroviário | 30 June 2027 | |

=== Released ===
| Date | Position | Nationality | Name | Joined | Date | Ref. |
|---|---|---|---|---|---|---|
| 10 June 2026 | MF | (Ukraine) | Oleksandr Karavayev | Shakhtar Donetsk | 10 June 2026 | |
| 19 June 2026 | MF | (Ukraine) | Oleksandr Yatsyk | Kharkiv | | |
| 30 June 2026 | GK | (Ukraine) | Denys Ignatenko | Livyi Bereh Kyiv | | |
| 30 June 2026 | MF | (Brazil) | Vitinho | Internacional | 1 July 2026 | |
| 30 June 2026 | FW | (Georgia (country)) | Giorgi Tsitaishvili | Rayo Vallecano | 12 August 2026 | |
| 1 July 2026 | GK | (Ukraine) | Valentyn Morgun | Kolos Kovalivka | | |

== Competitions ==
=== Overall record ===
| Competition | First match | Last match | Starting round | Final position | Record | | | | | | | |
| Competition | First match | Last match | Starting round | Final position | Pld | W | D | L | GF | GA | GD | Win % |
|---|---|---|---|---|---|---|---|---|---|---|---|---|
| Premier League | 9 August 2026 | | Matchday 2 | | 11 | 7 | 2 | 2 | 16 | 9 | +7 | 63.64 |
| Ukrainian Cup | 10 September 2026 | 27 October 2026 | Round of 32 | Round of 16 | 2 | 1 | 0 | 1 | 1 | 3 | −2 | 50.00 |
| Europa League | 9 July 2026 | 30 July 2026 | First qualifying round | Second qualifying round | 4 | 0 | 2 | 2 | 2 | 5 | −3 | 0.00 |
| Conference League | 6 August 2026 | 13 August 2026 | Third qualifying round | Third qualifying round | 2 | 1 | 0 | 1 | 1 | 2 | −1 | 50.00 |
| Total | | | | | 19 | 9 | 4 | 6 | 20 | 19 | +1 | 47.37 |

Last updated: 8 November 2026
Source: Results

=== Premier League ===
==== League table ====
| Pos | Team | Pld | W | D | L | GF | GA | GD | Pts | Qualification or relegation |
|---|---|---|---|---|---|---|---|---|---|---|
| 1 | Shakhtar Donetsk | 12 | 9 | 2 | 1 | 22 | 5 | +17 | 29 | Qualification for the Champions League second qualifying round |
| 2 | Polissya Zhytomyr | 11 | 9 | 1 | 1 | 25 | 8 | +17 | 28 | Qualification for the Conference League second qualifying round |
| 3 | Dynamo Kyiv | 11 | 7 | 2 | 2 | 16 | 9 | +7 | 23 | Qualification for the Conference League second qualifying round |
| 4 | Kharkiv | 9 | 7 | 0 | 2 | 18 | 7 | +11 | 21 | Qualified for the Quarter-finals UC |
| 5 | Karpaty Lviv | 11 | 5 | 4 | 2 | 22 | 8 | +14 | 19 | Qualified for the Quarter-finals UC |

Updated to match(es) played on 8 November 2026. Source: upl.ua
Rules for classification: 1) Points; 2) Head-to-head points; 3) Head-to-head goal difference; 4) Head-to-head goals scored; 5) Goal difference; 6) Goals scored; 7) Draw or "Golden match" if two teams are tied for title (Article 22, paragraph 3).

| Premier League teams | Agg. | First League teams | 1st leg | 2nd leg |
|---|---|---|---|---|
| | x–x | | | |
| | x–x | | | |

=== First Semi-final ===
| v |

| v |

=== Second Semi-final ===
| v |

| v |

==== Results summary ====
| Overall | | | | | | | | Home | | | | | | Away | | | | | |
| Pld | W | D | L | GF | GA | GD | Pts | W | D | L | GF | GA | GD | W | D | L | GF | GA | GD |
|---|---|---|---|---|---|---|---|---|---|---|---|---|---|---|---|---|---|---|---|
| 11 | 7 | 2 | 2 | 16 | 9 | +7 | 23 | 4 | 1 | 0 | 9 | 2 | +7 | 3 | 1 | 2 | 7 | 7 | 0 |

Last updated: 8 November 2026.
Source: Results

==== Results by round ====
| Round | 2 | 3 | 4 | 5 | 6 | 7 | 8 | 9 | 9 | 10 | 11 |
|---|---|---|---|---|---|---|---|---|---|---|---|
| Ground | A | H | A | H | H | A | H | A | H | A | A |
| Result | W | W | L | D | W | W | W | L | W | W | D |
| Position | 6 | 4 | 6 | 7 | 4 | 3 | 3 | 4 | 4 | 3 | 3 |

Updated to match(es) played on 8 November 2026. Source: Results
A = Away; H = Home; W = Win; D = Draw; L = Loss

==== Results ====
| 9 August 2026 2 | Veres Rivne | 1–2 | Dynamo Kyiv | Rivne |
| 18:00 EEST (UTC+3) | Vovchenko (yellow card) 16'; Kharatin 53'; Sharay (yellow card) 74' | Report | Bilovar (yellow card) 16'; Tymchyk 38'; Lonwijk (yellow card) 53'; Ponomarenko 90+2' (pen.) | Stadium: Avanhard Stadium; Attendance: 5,400; Referee: Oleksii Derevinskyi |

| 16 August 2026 3 | Dynamo Kyiv | 2–1 | Kolos Kovalivka | Kyiv |
| 18:00 EEST (UTC+3) | Ponomarenko 20'; Dubinchak (yellow card) 45+1'; Brazhko (yellow card) 56' (yellow-red card) 85' (goal) 73'; Yarmolenko (yellow card) 89' | Report | Demchenko 21'; Telles (yellow card) 25'; Salabay (yellow card) 63'; Honcharenko (yellow card) 84' | Stadium: Valeriy Lobanovskyi Stadium; Attendance: 3,750; Referee: Andrii Kovalenko |

| 31 August 2026 4 | Bukovyna Chernivtsi | 2–0 | Dynamo Kyiv | Kamianets-Podilskyi |
| EEST (UTC+3) | Kozhushko 12'; Surkis 54' (o.g.); Ilyin 83' | Report | Voloshyn (yellow card) 56' | Stadium: Tonkocheyev Stadium; Referee: Volodymyr Novohatnii |

| 6 September 2026 5 | Dynamo Kyiv | 0–0 | LNZ Cherkasy | Kyiv |
| 13:00 EEST (UTC+3) | Kędziora (yellow card) 15' | Report | Dajko (yellow card) 45+1'; Yade (yellow card) 78' | Stadium: Valeriy Lobanovskyi Stadium; Attendance: 2,288; Referee: Oleksandr Omelchenko |

| 14 September 2026 6 | Dynamo Kyiv | 3–0 | Epitsentr Kamianets-Podilskyi | Kyiv |
| 15:30 EEST (UTC+3) | Yarmolenko (yellow card) 31' (goal) 42'; Lonwijk 49'; Mykhavko (yellow card) 59'; Voloshyn (yellow card) 77'; Ponomarenko 85' | Report | Vashchenko (yellow card) 15'; Repaj (yellow card) 67'; Kozak (yellow card) 72'; Rojas (yellow card) 84' | Stadium: Valeriy Lobanovskyi Stadium; Attendance: 955; Referee: Oleksandr Shandor |

| 19 September 2026 7 | Zorya Luhansk | 0–2 | Dynamo Kyiv | Kyiv |
| 15:30 EEST (UTC+3) | Jordan (yellow card) 80'; Budkivskyi (yellow card) 87'; Hlushchenko (yellow card) 90+2' | Report | Brazhko 83'; Ponomarenko 86'; Mykhavko (yellow card) 87' | Stadium: Valeriy Lobanovskyi Stadium; Attendance: 1,567; Referee: Dmytro Panchyshyn |

| 11 October 2026 8 | Dynamo Kyiv | 1–0 | Karpaty Lviv | Kyiv |
| 13:00 EEST (UTC+3) | Rubchynskyi (yellow card) 30'; Ponomarenko 66' (yellow card) 86'; Bah (yellow card) 77' | Report | Rusyn (yellow card) 22' (yellow-red card) 62'; Séry (yellow card) 48'; Sapuha (yellow card) 54'; Diedov (yellow card) 87' | Stadium: Valeriy Lobanovskyi Stadium; Attendance: 3,336; Referee: Denys Shurman |

| 18 October 2026 9 | Polissya Zhytomyr | 3–1 | Dynamo Kyiv | Zhytomyr |
| 13:00 EEST (UTC+3) | Kudryk (red card) 4'; Krasnopir 26', 68' (pen.), 76'; Maisuradze (yellow card) 45'; Araujo (yellow card) 45'; Mykhaylichenko (yellow card) 50' | Report | Mykhavko 19'; Dubinchak (yellow card) 39'; Rubchynskyi (yellow card) 54'; Neshcheret (yellow card) 67' | Stadium: Tsentralnyi Stadium; Attendance: 4,120; Referee: Maksym Kozyriatskyi |

| 23 October 2026 10 | Dynamo Kyiv | 3–1 | Kudrivka | Kyiv |
| 13:00 EEST (UTC+3) | Veklyak 28' (o.g.); Mykhaylenko 46'; Mykhavko (yellow card) 59'; Pikhalyonok 79' | Report | Dumanyuk (yellow card) 60'; Byelyayev (yellow card) 62'; Mykhavko 67' (o.g.); Plaksa (yellow card) 89' | Stadium: Valeriy Lobanovskyi Stadium; Attendance: 412; Referee: Mykhailo Raida |

| 2 November 2026 11 | Kryvbas Kryvyi Rih | 0–2 | Dynamo Kyiv | Kryvyi Rih |
| 13:00 EET (UTC+2) | Pidhurskyi (yellow card) 32'; Vilivald (yellow card) 42'; Herbert (yellow card) 45+2'; Jones (yellow card) 45+3' | Report | Ponomarenko 22' (yellow card) 79'; Yarmolenko 43' (pen.) (red card) 45+3'; Brazhko (yellow card) 45+2'; Shaparenko (yellow card) 45+3'; Voloshyn (yellow card) 86' | Stadium: Hirnyk Stadium; Attendance: 693; Referee: Oleksandr Shandor |

| 8 November 2026 12 | Shakhtar Donetsk | 0–0 | Dynamo Kyiv | Lviv |
| 18:00 EET (UTC+2) | Tobias (red card) 53'; Marlon (yellow card) 69'; Meirelles (yellow card) 85' | Report | Kędziora (yellow card) 28'; Sych (yellow card) 51'; Dubinchak (yellow card) 53'; Shaparenko (yellow card) 89' | Stadium: Arena Lviv; Attendance: 4,023; Referee: Dmytro Panchyshyn |

| 22 November 2026 13 | Dynamo Kyiv | v | Obolon Kyiv | Kyiv |
| EEST (UTC+3) | | | | Stadium: Valeriy Lobanovskyi Stadium |

=== Ukrainian Cup ===
| 10 September 2026 Round of 32 | Nyva Vinnytsia | 0–1 | Dynamo Kyiv | Vinnytsia |
| 15:30 EEST (UTC+3) | | Report | Dykyi (yellow card) 47'; Thiaré 50' | Stadium: NTB Nyva; Attendance: 2,590; Referee: Oleksandr Kalonov |

| 27 October 2026 Round of 16 | Shakhtar Donetsk | 3–0 | Dynamo Kyiv | Lviv |
| 18:00 EET (UTC+2) | Pedro Henrique (yellow card) 15'; Bondar (yellow card) 17'; Ocheretko (yellow card) 31'; Marlon (yellow card) 37'; Mendoza 43'; Isaque 74'; Newerton (yellow card) 80'; Alisson 87' | Report | Mykhavko (red card) 31'; Thiaré (red card) 90+2'; Guerrero (red card) FT | Stadium: Arena Lviv; Attendance: 4,160; Referee: Viktor Kopievskii |

=== UEFA Europa League ===
==== Qualifying phase ====
| 9 July 2026 First qualifying round 1st leg | Dynamo Kyiv (Ukraine) | 0–0 | (Romania) Universitatea Cluj | Lublin, Poland |
| 20:00 EEST (UTC+3) | | Report | Drammeh (yellow card) 72' | Stadium: Arena Lublin; Attendance: 1,795; Referee: Joonas Jaanovits (Estonia) |
Note: Due to the Russian invasion of Ukraine, Ukrainian teams were required to play their home matches at neutral venues until further notice.

| 16 July 2026 First qualifying round 2nd leg | Universitatea Cluj (Azerbaijan) | 0–0 (a.e.t.) (0–0 agg.) (2–4 p) | (Ukraine) Dynamo Kyiv | Cluj-Napoca, Romania |
| 20:30 EEST (UTC+3) | Drammeh (yellow card) 4'; Chipciu (yellow card) 45+2'; Pinho (yellow card) 70' | Report | Redushko (yellow card) 59'; Mykhavko (yellow card) 86'; Lonwijk (yellow card) 105+1' | Stadium: Cluj Arena; Attendance: 20,043; Referee: Iwan Griffith (Wales) |
| | Penalties |
| | Nistor (penalty scored); Codrea (penalty missed); Chipciu (penalty missed); Bic (penalty scored) | | (penalty scored) Yarmolenko; (penalty scored) Brazhko; (penalty scored) Ponomarenko; (penalty scored) Lonwijk |

| 23 July 2026 Second qualifying round 1st leg | Dynamo Kyiv (Ukraine) | 2–3 | (Greece) PAOK | Lublin, Poland |
| 20:00 EEST (UTC+3) | Brazhko 3'; Ponomarenko (yellow card) 46'; Lonwijk 77' | Report | Konstantelias 13' (yellow card) 63'; Zafeiris 38'; Santamaria 51'; Chatzidiakos (yellow card) 57'; Jeremejeff (yellow card) 88' | Stadium: Arena Lublin; Attendance: 3,225; Referee: Sandi Putros (Denmark) |
Note: Due to the Russian invasion of Ukraine, Ukrainian teams were required to play their home matches at neutral venues until further notice.

| 30 July 2026 Second qualifying round 2nd leg | PAOK (Greece) | 2–0 (5–2 agg.) | (Ukraine) Dynamo Kyiv | Thessaloniki, Greece |
| 20:45 EEST (UTC+3) | Chatzidiakos (yellow card) 35'; Konstantelias 45+1', 48' | Report | Ponomarenko (yellow card) 50'; Shaparenko (yellow card) 78' | Stadium: Toumba Stadium; Attendance: 18,760; Referee: Damian Sylwestrzak (Poland) |

=== UEFA Conference League ===
==== Qualifying rounds ====
| 6 August 2026 Third qualifying round 1st leg | Dynamo Kyiv (Ukraine) | 1–0 | (Azerbaijan) Qarabağ | Lublin, Poland |
| 20:00 EEST (UTC+3) | Ponomarenko 10'; Dubinchak (yellow card) 14'; Kędziora (yellow card) 81'; Shaparenko (yellow card) 90+5' | Report | Makreckis (red card) 90+1'; Silva (yellow card) 90+4' | Stadium: Arena Lublin; Attendance: 4,335; Referee: Morten Krogh (Denmark) |
Note: Due to the Russian invasion of Ukraine, Ukrainian teams were required to play their home matches at neutral venues until further notice.

| 13 August 2026 Third qualifying round 2nd leg | Qarabağ (Azerbaijan) | 2–0 (2–1 agg.) | (Ukraine) Dynamo Kyiv | Baku, Azerbaijan |
| 19:00 EEST (UTC+3) | Mouaddib 12'; Guseynov (yellow card) 62'; Kashchuk 69' | Report | Dubinchak (yellow card) 29'; Ponomarenko (yellow card) 45+4' | Stadium: Tofiq Bahramov Republican Stadium; Attendance: 26,449; Referee: Stuart Attwell (England) |

== Squad statistics ==
As of match played 8 November 2026

=== Appearances and goals ===
| No. | Pos | Nat | Player | Total | | Premier League | | Ukrainian Cup | | UEFA Europa League | | UEFA Conference League | |
| No. | Pos | Nat | Player | Apps | Goals | Apps | Goals | Apps | Goals | Apps | Goals | Apps | Goals |
|---|---|---|---|---|---|---|---|---|---|---|---|---|---|
| 1 | GK | (Ukraine) UKR | Heorhiy Bushchan | 8 | 0 | 7 | 0 | 1 | 0 | 0 | 0 | 0 | 0 |
| 2 | DF | (Ukraine) UKR | Kostyantyn Vivcharenko | 1 | 0 | 0 | 0 | 0 | 0 | 0+1 | 0 | 0 | 0 |
| 5 | DF | (Ukraine) UKR | Oleksiy Sych | 14 | 0 | 7+2 | 0 | 1+1 | 0 | 1 | 0 | 2 | 0 |
| 6 | MF | (Ukraine) UKR | Volodymyr Brazhko | 17 | 3 | 9 | 2 | 1+1 | 0 | 4 | 1 | 2 | 0 |
| 7 | MF | (Ukraine) UKR | Andriy Yarmolenko | 13 | 2 | 8+2 | 2 | 0 | 0 | 0+3 | 0 | 0 | 0 |
| 8 | MF | (Ukraine) UKR | Oleksandr Pikhalyonok | 14 | 1 | 2+6 | 1 | 1+1 | 0 | 3 | 0 | 0+1 | 0 |
| 9 | MF | (Ukraine) UKR | Nazar Voloshyn | 17 | 0 | 4+6 | 0 | 2 | 0 | 4 | 0 | 0+1 | 0 |
| 10 | MF | (Ukraine) UKR | Mykola Shaparenko | 15 | 0 | 8 | 0 | 1 | 0 | 3+1 | 0 | 0+2 | 0 |
| 11 | FW | (Ukraine) UKR | Matviy Ponomarenko | 18 | 7 | 10+1 | 6 | 1 | 0 | 4 | 0 | 2 | 1 |
| 14 | MF | (Ukraine) UKR | Pavlo Lyusin | 1 | 0 | 0 | 0 | 1 | 0 | 0 | 0 | 0 | 0 |
| 15 | MF | (Ukraine) UKR | Valentyn Rubchynskyi | 11 | 0 | 6+2 | 0 | 0 | 0 | 0+1 | 0 | 2 | 0 |
| 16 | MF | (Nigeria) NGR | Shola Ogundana | 7 | 0 | 2+1 | 0 | 1 | 0 | 0+2 | 0 | 0+1 | 0 |
| 18 | DF | (Ukraine) UKR | Oleksandr Tymchyk | 8 | 1 | 4+1 | 1 | 0+1 | 0 | 0 | 0 | 0+2 | 0 |
| 20 | FW | (Ukraine) UKR | Vladyslav Supryaha | 1 | 0 | 0 | 0 | 0+1 | 0 | 0 | 0 | 0 | 0 |
| 21 | MF | (Suriname) SUR | Justin Lonwijk | 14 | 2 | 5+4 | 1 | 0 | 0 | 1+2 | 1 | 2 | 0 |
| 22 | MF | (Ukraine) UKR | Vladyslav Kabayev | 13 | 0 | 7+2 | 0 | 0+1 | 0 | 0+1 | 0 | 0+2 | 0 |
| 23 | MF | (Ukraine) UKR | Navin Malysh | 7 | 0 | 1+4 | 0 | 1 | 0 | 0+1 | 0 | 0 | 0 |
| 29 | MF | (Ukraine) UKR | Vitaliy Buyalskyi | 8 | 0 | 2+1 | 0 | 0 | 0 | 1+3 | 0 | 0+1 | 0 |
| 32 | DF | (Ukraine) UKR | Taras Mykhavko | 17 | 1 | 8+1 | 1 | 2 | 0 | 4 | 0 | 2 | 0 |
| 35 | GK | (Ukraine) UKR | Ruslan Neshcheret | 4 | 0 | 1 | 0 | 0 | 0 | 3 | 0 | 0 | 0 |
| 39 | FW | (Panama) PAN | Eduardo Guerrero | 9 | 0 | 1+3 | 0 | 1+1 | 0 | 1 | 0 | 2 | 0 |
| 40 | DF | (Ukraine) UKR | Kristian Bilovar | 8 | 0 | 2+1 | 0 | 0 | 0 | 3+1 | 0 | 1 | 0 |
| 42 | MF | (Ivory Coast) CIV | Keasse Bah | 6 | 0 | 0+5 | 0 | 0+1 | 0 | 0 | 0 | 0 | 0 |
| 43 | GK | (Ukraine) UKR | Illia Olkhovyi | 2 | 0 | 0+1 | 0 | 1 | 0 | 0 | 0 | 0 | 0 |
| 44 | DF | (Ukraine) UKR | Vladyslav Dubinchak | 17 | 0 | 10 | 0 | 1+1 | 0 | 3 | 0 | 2 | 0 |
| 47 | MF | (Brazil) BRA | Gustavo Prado | 1 | 0 | 0+1 | 0 | 0 | 0 | 0 | 0 | 0 | 0 |
| 66 | DF | (Senegal) SEN | Aliou Thiaré | 6 | 1 | 3 | 0 | 1+1 | 1 | 1 | 0 | 0 | 0 |
| 70 | FW | (Ukraine) UKR | Bohdan Redushko | 6 | 0 | 0 | 0 | 0 | 0 | 3+1 | 0 | 2 | 0 |
| 71 | GK | (Ukraine) UKR | Viacheslav Surkis | 6 | 0 | 3 | 0 | 0 | 0 | 1 | 0 | 2 | 0 |
| 90 | DF | (Ukraine) UKR | Denys Dykyi | 1 | 0 | 0 | 0 | 1 | 0 | 0 | 0 | 0 | 0 |
| 91 | MF | (Ukraine) UKR | Mykola Mykhaylenko | 8 | 1 | 1+5 | 1 | 2 | 0 | 0 | 0 | 0 | 0 |
| 94 | DF | (Poland) POL | Tomasz Kędziora | 15 | 0 | 9 | 0 | 1 | 0 | 4 | 0 | 1 | 0 |
| 99 | FW | (France) FRA | Pierre Mounguengue | 6 | 0 | 1+3 | 0 | 1 | 0 | 0+1 | 0 | 0 | 0 |
Players away on loan:
Players who left Dynamo Kyiv during the season:

=== Goalscorers ===
| Place | Position | Nation | Number | Name | Premier League | Ukrainian Cup | Europa League | Conference League | Total |
|---|---|---|---|---|---|---|---|---|---|
| 1 | FW | (Ukraine) | 11 | Matviy Ponomarenko | 6 | 0 | 0 | 1 | 7 |
| 2 | MF | (Ukraine) | 6 | Volodymyr Brazhko | 2 | 0 | 1 | 0 | 3 |
| 3 | MF | (Ukraine) | 7 | Andriy Yarmolenko | 2 | 0 | 0 | 0 | 2 |
| 4 | DF | (Ukraine) | 18 | Oleksandr Tymchyk | 1 | 0 | 0 | 0 | 1 |
| 4 | MF | (Suriname) | 21 | Justin Lonwijk | 1 | 0 | 0 | 0 | 1 |
| 4 | DF | (Ukraine) | 32 | Taras Mykhavko | 1 | 0 | 0 | 0 | 1 |
| 4 | MF | (Ukraine) | 91 | Mykola Mykhaylenko | 1 | 0 | 0 | 0 | 1 |
| 4 | MF | (Ukraine) | 8 | Oleksandr Pikhalyonok | 1 | 0 | 0 | 0 | 1 |
| 4 | DF | (Senegal) | 66 | Aliou Thiaré | 0 | 1 | 0 | 0 | 1 |
| 4 | MF | (Suriname) | 21 | Justin Lonwijk | 0 | 0 | 1 | 0 | 1 |
| 4 | | | | Own goal | 1 | 0 | 0 | 0 | 1 |
| TOTALS | | | | | 16 | 1 | 2 | 1 | 20 |

=== Clean sheets ===
| Place | Position | Nation | Number | Name | Premier League | Ukrainian Cup | Europa League | Conference League | Total |
|---|---|---|---|---|---|---|---|---|---|
| 1 | GK | (Ukraine) | 1 | Heorhiy Bushchan | 6 | 0 | 0 | 0 | 6 |
| 2 | GK | (Ukraine) | 35 | Ruslan Neshcheret | 0 | 0 | 2 | 0 | 2 |
| 3 | GK | (Ukraine) | 43 | Illia Olkhovyi | 0 | 1 | 0 | 0 | 1 |
| 3 | GK | (Ukraine) | 71 | Viacheslav Surkis | 0 | 0 | 0 | 1 | 1 |
| TOTALS | | | | | 6 | 1 | 2 | 1 | 10 |

=== Disciplinary record ===
| Number | Nation | Position | Name | Premier League | | Ukrainian Cup | | Europa League | | Conference League | | Total | |
| Number | Nation | Position | Name | Yellow card | Red card | Yellow card | Red card | Yellow card | Red card | Yellow card | Red card | Yellow card | Red card |
| 5 | (Ukraine) | DF | Oleksiy Sych | 1 | 0 | 0 | 0 | 0 | 0 | 0 | 0 | 1 | 0 |
| 6 | (Ukraine) | MF | Volodymyr Brazhko | 3 | 1 | 0 | 0 | 0 | 0 | 0 | 0 | 3 | 1 |
| 7 | (Ukraine) | MF | Andriy Yarmolenko | 2 | 1 | 0 | 0 | 0 | 0 | 0 | 0 | 2 | 1 |
| 9 | (Ukraine) | MF | Nazar Voloshyn | 3 | 0 | 0 | 0 | 0 | 0 | 0 | 0 | 3 | 0 |
| 10 | (Ukraine) | MF | Mykola Shaparenko | 2 | 0 | 0 | 0 | 1 | 0 | 1 | 0 | 4 | 0 |
| 11 | (Ukraine) | FW | Matviy Ponomarenko | 2 | 0 | 0 | 0 | 2 | 0 | 1 | 0 | 5 | 0 |
| 15 | (Ukraine) | MF | Valentyn Rubchynskyi | 2 | 0 | 0 | 0 | 0 | 0 | 0 | 0 | 2 | 0 |
| 21 | (Suriname) | MF | Justin Lonwijk | 1 | 0 | 0 | 0 | 1 | 0 | 0 | 0 | 2 | 0 |
| 32 | (Ukraine) | DF | Taras Mykhavko | 3 | 0 | 0 | 1 | 1 | 0 | 0 | 0 | 4 | 1 |
| 35 | (Ukraine) | GK | Ruslan Neshcheret | 1 | 0 | 0 | 0 | 0 | 0 | 0 | 0 | 1 | 0 |
| 39 | (Panama) | FW | Eduardo Guerrero | 0 | 0 | 0 | 1 | 0 | 0 | 0 | 0 | 0 | 1 |
| 40 | (Ukraine) | DF | Kristian Bilovar | 1 | 0 | 0 | 0 | 0 | 0 | 0 | 0 | 1 | 0 |
| 42 | (Ivory Coast) | MF | Keasse Bah | 1 | 0 | 0 | 0 | 0 | 0 | 0 | 0 | 1 | 0 |
| 44 | (Ukraine) | DF | Vladyslav Dubinchak | 3 | 0 | 0 | 0 | 0 | 0 | 2 | 0 | 5 | 0 |
| 66 | (Senegal) | DF | Aliou Thiaré | 0 | 0 | 0 | 1 | 0 | 0 | 0 | 0 | 0 | 1 |
| 70 | (Ukraine) | FW | Bohdan Redushko | 0 | 0 | 0 | 0 | 1 | 0 | 0 | 0 | 1 | 0 |
| 90 | (Ukraine) | DF | Denys Dykyi | 0 | 0 | 1 | 0 | 0 | 0 | 0 | 0 | 1 | 0 |
| 94 | (Poland) | DF | Tomasz Kędziora | 2 | 0 | 0 | 0 | 0 | 0 | 1 | 0 | 3 | 0 |
Players away on loan:
Players who left Dynamo Kyiv during the season:
| | | | TOTALS | 27 | 2 | 1 | 3 | 6 | 0 | 5 | 0 | 39 | 5 |
