= 2023–24 FC Dynamo Kyiv season =

FC Dynamo Kyiv
2023–24 season
- President: Ihor Surkis
- Head coach: Mircea Lucescu (until 3 November); Oleksandr Shovkovskyi (from 3 November)
- Stadium: Olimpiyskiy (League); Dynamo Stadium (League); Rapid-Giulești Stadium (Europe)
- Ukrainian Premier League: 2nd
- Ukrainian Cup: Round of 16
- UEFA Europa Conference League: Play-off round
- Top goalscorer: League: Vladyslav Vanat (14); All: Vladyslav Vanat (14)
| Home colours | Away colours | Third colours |

The 2023–24 season was FC Dynamo Kyiv's 97th season in existence and 26th consecutive in the Ukrainian Premier League. They also competed in the Ukrainian Cup and the UEFA Europa Conference League.

== Season events ==
On 1 July, Dynamo Kyiv announced that they had signed a new contract with Anton Bol until the summer of 2026.

On 10 July, Dynamo Kyiv announced that they had signed a new contract with Oleksandr Karavayev until the summer of 2025.

On 3 November, Mircea Lucescu resigned as Head Coach. The following day, 4 November, Oleksandr Shovkovskyi was appointed as caretaker Head Coach.

On 5 March, Dynamo Kyiv announced that they had signed a new contract with Volodymyr Shepelyev until 31 December 2025.

On 22 April, Dynamo Kyiv announced that they had signed a new contract with Vladyslav Vanat until 30 June 2027.

== Squad ==
As of 18 September 2023

Note: Flags indicate national team as defined under FIFA eligibility rules; some limited exceptions apply. Players may hold more than one non-FIFA nationality.

| No. | Pos. | Nation | Player |
|---|---|---|---|
| 1 | GK | UKR | Heorhiy Bushchan |
| 2 | DF | UKR | Kostyantyn Vivcharenko |
| 4 | DF | UKR | Denys Popov |
| 6 | MF | UKR | Volodymyr Brazhko |
| 7 | FW | UKR | Andriy Yarmolenko |
| 8 | MF | UKR | Volodymyr Shepelyev |
| 9 | FW | UKR | Matviy Ponomarenko |
| 10 | MF | UKR | Mykola Shaparenko |
| 11 | FW | UKR | Vladyslav Vanat |
| 18 | MF | UKR | Oleksandr Andriyevskyi |
| 20 | DF | UKR | Oleksandr Karavayev |
| 21 | FW | UKR | Vladyslav Supryaha |
| 22 | MF | UKR | Vladyslav Kabayev |
| 23 | DF | UKR | Navin Malysh |

| No. | Pos. | Nation | Player |
|---|---|---|---|
| 24 | DF | UKR | Oleksandr Tymchyk |
| 25 | DF | UKR | Maksym Dyachuk |
| 29 | MF | UKR | Vitaliy Buyalskyi (captain) |
| 30 | MF | SEN | Samba Diallo |
| 32 | DF | UKR | Taras Mykhavko |
| 34 | DF | UKR | Oleksandr Syrota |
| 35 | GK | UKR | Ruslan Neshcheret |
| 37 | MF | UKR | Anton Tsarenko |
| 40 | DF | UKR | Kristian Bilovar |
| 44 | DF | UKR | Vladyslav Dubinchak |
| 52 | GK | UKR | Valentyn Morhun |
| 74 | GK | UKR | Denys Ihnatenko |
| 77 | MF | NGR | Benito |
| 91 | MF | UKR | Nazar Voloshyn |

=== Out on loan ===
Note: Flags indicate national team as defined under FIFA eligibility rules; some limited exceptions apply. Players may hold more than one non-FIFA nationality.

| No. | Pos. | Nation | Player |
|---|---|---|---|
| — | DF | UKR | Anton Bol (at Zorya Luhansk until 30 June 2024) |
| — | DF | POL | Tomasz Kędziora (at PAOK until 30 June 2024) |
| — | DF | UKR | Mykyta Kravchenko (at Polissya Zhytomyr until 30 June 2024) |
| — | MF | UKR | Serhiy Buletsa (at Zagłębie Lubin until 30 June 2024) |
| — | MF | DEN | Mikkel Duelund (at AGF until 30 June 2024) |
| — | MF | NED | Justin Lonwijk (at Anderlecht until 30 June 2024) |
| — | MF | UKR | Mykola Mykhaylenko (at Oleksandriya until 30 June 2024) |
| — | MF | UKR | Vitaliy Mykhayliv (at Mynai until 30 June 2024) |
| — | MF | JAM | Kaheem Parris (at Sabah until 30 June 2024) |

| No. | Pos. | Nation | Player |
|---|---|---|---|
| — | MF | LUX | Gerson Rodrigues (at Sivasspor until 30 June 2024) |
| — | MF | GEO | Heorhiy Tsitaishvili (at Dinamo Batumi until 30 June 2024) |
| — | MF | BRA | Vitinho (at Red Bull Bragantino until 30 June 2024) |
| — | MF | MKD | Reshat Ramadani (at Shkëndija until 30 June 2024) |
| — | MF | UKR | Vikentiy Voloshyn (at Zorya Luhansk until 30 June 2024) |
| — | MF | UKR | Oleksandr Yatsyk (at Zorya Luhansk until 30 June 2024) |
| — | FW | UKR | Viktor Bliznichenko (at Kryvbas Kryvyi Rih until 30 June 2024) |
| — | FW | UKR | Ihor Horbach (at Zorya Luhansk until 30 June 2024) |
| — | FW | VEN | Eric Ramírez (at Atlético Nacional until 30 June 2024) |

== Transfers ==
=== Out ===
| Date | Position | Nationality | Name | To | Fee | Ref. |
|---|---|---|---|---|---|---|
| 9 August 2023 | MF | (Ukraine) | Bohdan Lyednyev | Dnipro-1 | Undisclosed | |
| 5 September 2023 | MF | (Ukraine) | Serhiy Sydorchuk | KVC Westerlo | Undisclosed | |

=== Loans out ===
| Date from | Position | Nationality | Name | To | Date to | Ref. |
|---|---|---|---|---|---|---|
| 11 July 2023 | DF | (Poland) | Tomasz Kędziora | PAOK | 30 June 2024 | |
| 25 July 2023 | MF | (Netherlands) | Justin Lonwijk | RSC Anderlecht | 19 January 2024 | |
| 26 July 2023 | MF | (Luxembourg) | Gerson Rodrigues | Sivasspor | 30 June 2024 | |
| 26 July 2023 | MF | (Ukraine) | Serhiy Buletsa | Zagłębie Lubin | 30 June 2024 | |
| 26 July 2023 | MF | (Ukraine) | Anton Bol | Zorya Luhansk | 30 June 2024 | |
| 26 July 2023 | MF | (Ukraine) | Oleksandr Yatsyk | Zorya Luhansk | 30 June 2024 | |
| 26 July 2023 | MF | (Ukraine) | Vikentiy Voloshyn | Zorya Luhansk | 30 June 2024 | |
| 3 August 2023 | DF | (Ukraine) | Artem Benedyuk | Zorya Luhansk | 30 June 2024 | |
| 3 August 2023 | MF | (Ukraine) | Artem Slesar | Zorya Luhansk | 30 June 2024 | |
| 3 August 2023 | FW | (Ukraine) | Ihor Horbach | Zorya Luhansk | 30 June 2024 | |
| 6 September 2023 | MF | (Jamaica) | Kaheem Parris | Sabah | 30 June 2024 | |
| 19 January 2024 | MF | (Netherlands) | Justin Lonwijk | Fortuna Sittard | 30 June 2024 | |
| 11 February 2024 | MF | (North Macedonia) | Reshat Ramadani | Shkëndija | 30 June 2024 | |

=== Released ===
| Date | Position | Nationality | Name | Joined | Date | Ref. |
|---|---|---|---|---|---|---|
| 1 July 2023 | DF | (Ukraine) | Mykyta Burda | Kolos Kovalivka | 1 July 2023 | |
| 6 September 2023 | MF | (Ukraine) | Denys Harmash | Osijek | 6 September 2023 | |
| 15 September 2023 | DF | (Brazil) | Sidcley | Lamia | 16 September 2023 | |
| 30 June 2024 | MF | (Denmark) | Mikkel Duelund | AGF | 1 July 2024 | |

== Friendlies ==
| 5 July 2023 | Dynamo Kyiv | 4–1 | Dinamo București |
| 18:00 EEST (UTC+3) | Voloshyn 10'; Popov (yellow card) 15'; Tsarenko 18'; (yellow card) 45'; Dubinchak 67'; Kabayev 73' | Report | Bani 40' |

| 8 July 2023 | Dynamo Kyiv | 8–0 | Wolfsberger AC |
| 19:30 EEST (UTC+3) | Lyednyev 6'; Kabayev 26', 59'; Shepelyev 46'; Benito 68', 90'; Yarmolenko 87'; Buyalskyi 87' | Report |

| 12 July 2023 | Young Boys | 3–3 | Dynamo Kyiv |
| 20:00 EEST (UTC+3) | Elia 19'; Nsame 36'; Łakomy 64' | Report | Dubinchak 9'; Benito 23'; Lustenberger 90+1' |

| 16 July 2023 | Dynamo Kyiv | 4–0 | Aris Limassol |
| 19:00 EEST (UTC+3) | Sydorchuk (yellow card) 33' (goal) 42'; Benito 48'; Voloshyn 88', 90+1' | Report | Sané (yellow card) 25' |

| 19 July 2023 | Al Hilal | 0–1 | Dynamo Kyiv |
| 19:00 EEST (UTC+3) | Neves (yellow card) 27'; Al-Bulaihi (yellow card) 58' (yellow-red card) 75'; Koulibaly (yellow card) 72' | Report | Buyalskyi 5'; Sydorchuk (yellow card) 30' |

| 26 January 2024 | Dynamo Kyiv | 0–2 | Ballkani | Belek, Turkey |
| 16:00 EET (UTC+2) | Ponomarenko (yellow card) 39'; Dyachuk (yellow card) 80' | Report | Danfa 20'; (yellow card) 24'; Zyba (yellow card) 38'; Berisha 74' (pen.) |

| 29 January 2024 | Legia Warsaw | 3–1 | Dynamo Kyiv | Belek, Turkey |
| 16:00 EET (UTC+2) | Muçi 31'; Augustyniak 45'; Kramer 55' | Report | Benito 34' |

| 30 January 2024 | Dynamo Kyiv | 5–1 | Pakhtakor | Belek, Turkey |
| 16:00 EET (UTC+2) | Vanat 12' (pen.), 35'; Popov (yellow card) 30'; Benito 44'; Tsarenko 47'; Brazhko 82'; Kabayev (yellow card) 87'; Dyachuk (yellow card) 89' | Report | Adkhamzoda 41' |

| 2 February 2024 | Levski Sofia | 1–0 | Dynamo Kyiv | Belek, Turkey |
| 16:00 EET (UTC+2) | Galchev 22' | Report |

| 8 February 2024 | Dynamo Kyiv | 5–2 | Liepāja | Belek, Turkey |
| 17:00 EET (UTC+2) | Tsarenko 8'; Dyachuk 22'; Supryaha 34'; Karavayev 48'; Vanat 66' | Report | Kayramani 18'; Silagadze 45' |

| 9 February 2024 | Dynamo Kyiv | 1–1 | Shkëndija | Belek, Turkey |
| 16:00 EET (UTC+2) | Vanat 60' | Report | Shala 26' |

| 12 February 2024 | Dynamo Kyiv | 1–0 | RFS | Belek, Turkey |
| 16:00 EET (UTC+2) | Shaparenko 69' | Report |

| 13 February 2024 | Dynamo Kyiv | 0–0 | Dinamo Tbilisi | Belek, Turkey |
| 16:00 EET (UTC+2) | | Report |

| 16 February 2024 | Dynamo Kyiv | 1–1 | Petrocub Hîncești | Belek, Turkey |
| 16:00 EET (UTC+2) | Supryaha 29' | Report | M.Plătică 2' |

| 17 February 2024 | Dynamo Kyiv | 2–0 | Sheriff Tiraspol | Belek, Turkey |
| 15:00 EET (UTC+2) | Buyalskyi 58'; Voloshyn 80' | Report |

== Competitions ==
=== Overall record ===
| Competition | First match | Last match | Starting round | Final position | Record | | | | | | | |
| Competition | First match | Last match | Starting round | Final position | Pld | W | D | L | GF | GA | GD | Win % |
|---|---|---|---|---|---|---|---|---|---|---|---|---|
| Premier League | 5 August 2023 | 25 May 2024 | Matchday 1 | 2nd | 30 | 22 | 3 | 5 | 72 | 28 | +44 | 73.33 |
| Ukrainian Cup | 27 September 2023 | | Round of 16 | Round of 16 | 1 | 0 | 0 | 1 | 0 | 1 | −1 | 0.00 |
| UEFA Europa Conference League | 10 August 2023 | 31 August 2023 | Third qualifying round | Play-off round | 4 | 1 | 0 | 3 | 4 | 6 | −2 | 25.00 |
| Total | | | | | 35 | 23 | 3 | 9 | 76 | 35 | +41 | 65.71 |

Last updated: 25 May 2024
Source: Soccerway

=== Premier League ===
==== League table ====
| Pos | Team | Pld | W | D | L | GF | GA | GD | Pts | Qualification or relegation |
|---|---|---|---|---|---|---|---|---|---|---|
| 1 | Shakhtar Donetsk (C) | 30 | 22 | 5 | 3 | 63 | 24 | +39 | 71 | Qualification for the Champions League league stage (Note: Since already qualified Real Madrid won the Champions League, Shakhtar Donetsk was promoted to the Champions League league phase as the champion with the highest coefficient in Champions League qualifying.) |
| 2 | Dynamo Kyiv | 30 | 22 | 3 | 5 | 72 | 28 | +44 | 69 | Qualification for the Champions League second qualifying round |
| 3 | Kryvbas Kryvyi Rih | 30 | 17 | 6 | 7 | 51 | 30 | +21 | 57 | Qualification for the Europa League third qualifying round (Note: Since the 2023–24 Ukrainian Cup winners (Shakhtar Donetsk) finished in the top two, the Europa League spot was passed to the third-placed team, and the second Conference League second qualifying round spot was passed to the fifth-placed team.) |
| 4 | Dnipro-1 (D) | 30 | 14 | 10 | 6 | 40 | 27 | +13 | 52 | Withdrew after the season (Note: SC Dnipro-1 that withdrew from all tournaments of the 2024–25 season due to financial hardship after finishing 4th in the league qualified for the Conference League second qualifying round, however it was awarded technical losses in both matches (0:3).) |
| 5 | Polissya Zhytomyr | 30 | 14 | 8 | 8 | 39 | 30 | +9 | 50 | Qualification for the Conference League second qualifying round |

Source: upl.ua
Rules for classification: 1) Points; 2) Head-to-head points; 3) Head-to-head goal difference; 4) Head-to-head goals scored; 5) Goal difference; 6) Goals scored; 7) Draw or "Golden match" if two teams tied for title (Article 22, paragraph 3).
(C) Champions; (D) Disqualified

==== Results summary ====
| Overall | | | | | | | | Home | | | | | | Away | | | | | |
| Pld | W | D | L | GF | GA | GD | Pts | W | D | L | GF | GA | GD | W | D | L | GF | GA | GD |
|---|---|---|---|---|---|---|---|---|---|---|---|---|---|---|---|---|---|---|---|
| 30 | 22 | 3 | 5 | 72 | 28 | +44 | 69 | 12 | 1 | 2 | 36 | 9 | +27 | 10 | 2 | 3 | 36 | 19 | +17 |

Last updated: 25 May 2024.

==== Results by round ====
| Round | 1 | 2 | 4 | 7 | 8 | 9 | 10 | 11 | 12 | 13 | 14 | 15 | 3^{1} | 17 | 18 | 19 | 20 | 21 | 22 | 6^{2} | 23 | 24 | 16 | 25 | 26 | 5^{4} | 27 | 28 | 29 | 30 |
|---|---|---|---|---|---|---|---|---|---|---|---|---|---|---|---|---|---|---|---|---|---|---|---|---|---|---|---|---|---|---|
| Ground | H | A | A | H | A | H | A | H | A | H | A | H | H | H | A | H | A | H | A | A | H | A | A | H | A | H | H | A | H | A |
| Result | W | W | L | W | W | W | L | L | D | L | W | W | W | W | W | W | D | W | W | W | D | W | W | W | W | W | W | L | W | W |
| Position | | | | | | | | | | | | | | | | | | | | | | | | | | | | | | |

Updated to match(es) played on 25 May 2024. Source:
A = Away; H = Home; W = Win; D = Draw; L = Loss; P = Postponed
Notes:
- ^{1} Matchday 3 (vs Metalist 1925 Kharkiv) was postponed.
- ^{2} Matchday 6 (vs Zorya Luhansk) was postponed.
- ^{3} Matchday 16 (vs Mynai) was postponed.
- ^{4} Matchday 5 (vs Veres Rivne) was postponed.

==== Matches ====
| 30 July 2023 1 | Dynamo Kyiv | 4–1 | Mynai | Kyiv |
| 17:00 EEST (UTC+3) | Vanat 27', 30'; Popov (red card) 32'; Buyalskyi 87' (pen.); Brazhko (yellow card) 90'; Karavayev 90+4' | Report | Vitenchuk 3'; Vitenchuk (yellow card) 45+1'; Panasenko (yellow card) 46'; Kravchuk (yellow card) 54' | Stadium: Valeriy Lobanovskyi Dynamo Stadium; Attendance: 0 Referee: Maksym Kozyriatskyi |

| 4 August 2023 2 | Obolon Kyiv | 2–4 | Dynamo Kyiv | Kyiv |
| 17:00 EEST (UTC+3) | Moroz (yellow card) 30'; Chernenko 44'; Karas 51'; Hrusha (yellow card) 69' (yellow-red card) 73'; Medynskyi (yellow card) 80' | Report | Vanat 20'; Kabayev (yellow card) 22'; Yarmolenko 31' (pen.), 77' (pen.); Buyalskyi 45+6'; Sydorchuk (yellow card) 58'; Shepelyev (yellow card) 78'; Dubinchak (yellow card) 80'; Vivcharenko (yellow card) 88' | Stadium: Obolon Arena; Attendance: 0 Referee: Yurii Ivanov |

| 20 August 2023 4 | Chornomorets Odesa | 3–2 | Dynamo Kyiv | Odesa |
| 17:00 EEST (UTC+3) | Avahimyan 20'; Putrya (yellow card) 39'; Shtohrin 53'; Boychuk (yellow card) 55'; Iyede (yellow card) 82' (goal) 90+1' | Report | Yarmolenko 48'; Syrota (yellow card) 51' (yellow-red card) 83'; Dyachuk (yellow card) 53'; Sydorchuk 60' | Stadium: Chornomorets Stadium; Attendance: 0 Referee: Oleksandr Omelchenko |

| 18 September 2023 7 | Dynamo Kyiv | 2–0 | Vorskla Poltava | Kyiv |
| 17:00 EEST (UTC+3) | Voloshyn 5'; Benito 83' | Report | Santana (yellow card) 29'; Sklyar (yellow card) 38'; Korniyenko (yellow card) 44' | Stadium: Valeriy Lobanovskyi Dynamo Stadium; Attendance: 0 Referee: Yaroslav Kozyk |

| 23 September 2023 8 | LNZ Cherkasy | 2–4 | Dynamo Kyiv | Cherkasy |
| 13:00 EEST (UTC+3) | Oliynyk (yellow card) 29'; Norenkov (yellow card) 44'; Boyko 61' (pen.); Muravskyi (yellow card) 76'; Pryadun 90+1' | Report | Brazhko 3'; Voloshyn (yellow card) 66' (goal) 90+3'; Buyalskyi (yellow card) 67' (goal) 77' (pen.); Yarmolenko 73' | Stadium: Cherkasy Arena; Attendance: 0 Referee: Yaroslav Kozyk |

| 1 October 2023 9 | Dynamo Kyiv | 4–2 | Oleksandriya | Kyiv |
| 19:00 EEST (UTC+3) | Brazhko 15', 83'; Vanat 44'; Voloshyn (yellow card) 49'; Buyalskyi 90+3'; Karavayev (yellow card) 90+3'; Shepelyev (yellow card) 90+4' | Report | Siheyev (yellow card) 14'; Geovani 42'; Skorko 47' (yellow card) 51'; Shostak (yellow card) 65'; Kalitvintsev (yellow card) 71' | Stadium: Valeriy Lobanovskyi Dynamo Stadium; Attendance: 0 Referee: Maksym Kozyriatskyi |

| 6 October 2023 10 | Polissya Zhytomyr | 3–2 | Dynamo Kyiv | Zhytomyr |
| 15:00 EEST (UTC+3) | Krushynskyi 15'; Arielson (yellow card) 16'; Morozko (yellow card) 50' (yellow-red card) 57'; Tankovskyi (yellow card) 53'; Budkivskyi 64'; Kozak 70' | Report | Buyalskyi 3', 51' (pen.); Voloshyn (yellow card) 45'; Tymchyk (yellow card) 62'; Karavayev (red card) 90+3' | Stadium: Tsentralnyi Stadion; Attendance: 0 Referee: Vitalii Romanov |

| 22 October 2023 11 | Dynamo Kyiv | 0–1 | Dnipro-1 | Kyiv |
| 17:00 EEST (UTC+3) | Benito (yellow card) 68'; Dubinchak (yellow card) 70' | Report | Hutsulyak 13' (yellow card) 40'; Rubchynskyi (yellow card) 21'; Sarapiy (yellow card) 30'; Kapliyenko (yellow card) 90+4' | Stadium: Valeriy Lobanovskyi Dynamo Stadium; Attendance: 0 Referee: Viktor Kopievskii |

| 28 October 2023 12 | Kolos Kovalivka | 1–1 | Dynamo Kyiv | Kovalivka |
| 15:00 EEST (UTC+3) | Luchkevych 51'; Yemets (yellow card) 89' | Report | Tymchyk 19'; Vanat (yellow card) 31' (yellow-red card) 63'; Brazhko (yellow card) 72' | Stadium: Kolos Stadium; Attendance: 0 Referee: Maksym Kozyriatskyi |

| 3 November 2023 13 | Dynamo Kyiv | 0–1 | Shakhtar Donetsk | Kyiv |
| 17:00 EET (UTC+2) | Shepelyev (yellow card) 14'; Dyachuk (yellow card) 47'; Shaparenko (yellow card) 52'; N.Voloshyn (yellow card) 62'; Dubinchak (yellow card) 90+3' | Report | Kryskiv (yellow card) 16'; Matviyenko (yellow card) 38'; Zubkov (yellow card) 53'; Gocholeishvili (yellow card) 77'; Bondar (yellow card) 85' | Stadium: Valeriy Lobanovskyi Dynamo Stadium; Attendance: 0 Referee: Yaroslav Kozyk |

| 12 November 2023 14 | Kryvbas Kryvyi Rih | 0–2 | Dynamo Kyiv | Kryvyi Rih |
| 13:00 EET (UTC+2) | Beskorovaynyi (red card) 12' | Report | Vanat 8' (yellow card) 57'; Karavayev 27'; Andriyevskyi (yellow card) 90' | Stadium: Hirnyk Stadium; Attendance: 0 Referee: Maksym Kozyriatskyi |

| 26 November 2023 15 | Dynamo Kyiv | 2–0 | Rukh Lviv | Kyiv |
| 15:00 EET (UTC+2) | Tymchyk 7'; Kabayev 43' | Report | | Stadium: Valeriy Lobanovskyi Dynamo Stadium; Attendance: 0 Referee: Volodymyr Novohatnii |

| 7 December 2023 3 | Dynamo Kyiv | 4–2 | Metalist 1925 Kharkiv | Kyiv |
| 15:00 EET (UTC+2) | Voloshyn 11', 22'; Vanat 34'; Dyachuk 90' | Report | Bychek (yellow card) 28' (yellow-red card) 41'; Dmytrenko 30'; Remenyuk 71'; Faryna (yellow card) 84' | Stadium: Valeriy Lobanovskyi Dynamo Stadium; Attendance: 0 Referee: Oleksandr Omelchenko |

| 11 December 2023 17 | Dynamo Kyiv | 2–0 | Obolon Kyiv | Kyiv |
| 15:00 EET (UTC+2) | Voloshyn (yellow card) 31'; Dubinchak (yellow card) 45'; Benito 66'; Vanat 88' (pen.); Brazhko (yellow card) 90+3'; Andriyevskyi (yellow card) 90+4' | Report | Vovkun (red card) 13'; Karas (yellow card) 73'; Moroz (yellow card) 74' (yellow-red card) 84'; Sydorchuk (yellow card) 81'; Lukyanchuk (yellow card) 88' | Stadium: Valeriy Lobanovskyi Dynamo Stadium; Attendance: 0 Referee: Viktor Kopievskii |

| 25 February 2024 18 | Metalist 1925 Kharkiv | 2–4 | Dynamo Kyiv | Kyiv |
| 15:30 EET (UTC+2) | Harmash 5' (yellow card) 30'; Faryna (yellow card) 17'; Chervak (yellow card) 45+1'; Owusu 72' (yellow card) 84'; Boryachuk (yellow card) 74'; Yurchenko (yellow card) 84'; Kurylo (yellow card) 87' | Report | Shaparenko (yellow card) 33'; Kabayev 43'; Vanat 62', 75'; Buyalskyi 69' | Stadium: Valeriy Lobanovskyi Dynamo Stadium; Attendance: 0 Referee: Viktor Kopievskii |

| 2 March 2024 19 | Dynamo Kyiv | 1–0 | Chornomorets Odesa | Kyiv |
| 15:30 EET (UTC+2) | Brazhko (yellow card) 26'; Kabayev (yellow card) 36'; Shepelyev 38' | Report | Zé Gomes (yellow card) 79' | Stadium: Valeriy Lobanovskyi Dynamo Stadium; Attendance: 1,800; Referee: Andrii Kovalenko |

| 7 March 2024 20 | Veres Rivne | 1–1 | Dynamo Kyiv | Rivne |
| 18:00 EET (UTC+2) | Sharay (yellow card) 33'; Mrvaljević (yellow card) 35' (goal) 90+9' (pen.); Kohut (yellow card) 90+3'; Júlio César (yellow card) 90+7'; Morozko (yellow card) 90+7' | Report | Voloshyn 5'; Popov (yellow card) 16'; Vanat (yellow card) 90+2'; Bushchan (yellow card) 90+7' | Stadium: Avanhard Stadium; Attendance: 2,487; Referee: Dmytro Panchyshyn |

| 12 March 2024 21 | Dynamo Kyiv | 2–0 | Zorya Luhansk | Kyiv |
| 15:30 EET (UTC+2) | Vanat 30'; Shepelyev (yellow card) 51'; Shaparenko (yellow card) 81'; Popov 85' | Report | | Stadium: Valeriy Lobanovskyi Dynamo Stadium; Attendance: 1,800; Referee: Vitalii Romanov |

| 31 March 2024 22 | Vorskla Poltava | 1–5 | Dynamo Kyiv | Poltava |
| 15:30 EEST (UTC+3) | Chelyadin (yellow card) 65'; Kovtalyuk 83' | Report | Vanat 30'; Tymchyk (yellow card) 39'; Brazhko 45+3'; Shaparenko 47' (pen.), 77'; Syrota (yellow card) 75'; Yarmolenko 78' | Stadium: Oleksiy Butovsky Vorskla Stadium; Attendance: 2,800; Referee: Oleksandr Shandor |

| 4 April 2024 6 | Zorya Luhansk | 0–3 | Dynamo Kyiv | Kyiv |
| 15:30 EEST (UTC+3) | Jordan (yellow card) 34'; Butko (yellow card) 90+1' | Report | Andriyevskyi 7'; Kabayev 22'; Brazhko 67'; Diallo (yellow card) 79'; Ponomarenko (yellow card) 80' | Stadium: Valeriy Lobanovskyi Dynamo Stadium; Attendance: 1,540; Referee: Oleksandr Omelchenko |
Note: Match originally scheduled for 1 September 2023.

| 8 April 2024 23 | Dynamo Kyiv | 1–1 | LNZ Cherkasy | Kyiv |
| 15:30 EEST (UTC+3) | Yarmolenko 15'; Vivcharenko (yellow card) 26'; Dyachuk (yellow card) 50'; Dubinchak (yellow card) 84' | Report | Boyko (yellow card) 23'; Rybalka (yellow card) 32'; Salihu 40'; Stasyuk (yellow card) 51'; Jashari (yellow card) 57'; Norenkov (yellow card) 68'; Thill (yellow card) 86'; Kucherenko (yellow card) 90+6' | Stadium: Valeriy Lobanovskyi Dynamo Stadium; Attendance: 1,540; Referee: Yurii Ivanov |

| 13 April 2024 24 | Oleksandriya | 0–1 | Dynamo Kyiv | Oleksandriia |
| 15:30 EEST (UTC+3) | Kovalets (yellow card) 22'; Kalyuzhnyi (yellow card) 90+5' | Report | Voloshyn (yellow card) 43' (yellow-red card) 45'; Tymchyk (yellow card) 53'; Brazhko (yellow card) 64' | Stadium: CSC Nika Stadium; Attendance: 1,180; Referee: Oleksii Derevinskyi |

| 17 April 2024 16 | Mynai | 1–3 | Dynamo Kyiv | Kyiv |
| 15:30 EEST (UTC+3) | Korablin 48'; Dmytruk (yellow card) 60'; Kysyl (yellow card) 90+1' | Report | Buyalskyi 5'; Nyemchaninov 29' (o.g.); Yarmolenko (yellow card) 56'; Vanat (yellow card) 75'; Voloshyn 86' | Stadium: Valeriy Lobanovskyi Dynamo Stadium; Attendance: 475; Referee: Oleksandr Shandor |
Note: Match originally scheduled for 3 December 2023, but postponed in the second minute due to an air raid siren.

| 21 April 2024 25 | Dynamo Kyiv | 3–0 | Polissya Zhytomyr | Kyiv |
| 18:00 EEST (UTC+3) | Vanat 32'; Shaparenko 51'; Buyalskyi (yellow card) 75' (goal) 77' | Report | Kushnirenko (yellow card) 38'; Kravets (yellow card) 61' (yellow-red card) 63'; Fortuné (yellow card) 69' | Stadium: Valeriy Lobanovskyi Dynamo Stadium; Attendance: 1,593; Referee: Volodymyr Novohatnii |

| 27 April 2024 26 | Dnipro-1 | 1–2 | Dynamo Kyiv | Dnipro |
| 13:00 EEST (UTC+3) | Sarapiy (yellow card) 33'; Hutsulyak 43'; Miroshnichenko (yellow card) 73'; Svatok (yellow card) 90+1'; Hadzhyiev (yellow card) 90+3'; Horbunov (yellow card) 90+5' | Report | Shaparenko (yellow card) 45'; Andriyevskyi (yellow card) 47'; Kabayev 49'; Yarmolenko (yellow card) 52'; Dyachuk (yellow card) 72'; Tymchyk (red card) 88'; Vanat 90' | Stadium: Dnipro-Arena; Attendance: 0 Referee: Yurii Ivanov |

| 1 May 2024 5 | Dynamo Kyiv | 3–0 | Veres Rivne | Kyiv |
| 15:30 EEST (UTC+3) | Yarmolenko 40'; Vanat (yellow card) 74'; Ponomarenko 80'; Shepelyev 84' | Report | Kucherenko (yellow card) 75' | Stadium: Valeriy Lobanovskyi Dynamo Stadium; Attendance: 1,377; Referee: Maksym Kozyriatskyi |
Note: Match originally scheduled for 27 August 2023.

| 5 May 2024 27 | Dynamo Kyiv | 5–0 | Kolos Kovalivka | Kyiv |
| 15:30 EEST (UTC+3) | Bondarenko 48' (o.g.); Yarmolenko 51'; Buyalskyi 52'; Kabayev 68'; Voloshyn 71' | Report | Bezborodko (yellow card) 25'; Tsurikov (yellow card) 47' | Stadium: Valeriy Lobanovskyi Dynamo Stadium; Attendance: 1,687; Referee: Denys Shurman |

| 11 May 2024 28 | Shakhtar Donetsk | 1–0 | Dynamo Kyiv | Lviv |
| 18:00 EEST (UTC+3) | Sudakov (yellow card) 27' (goal) 33' (pen.); Matviyenko (yellow card) 41'; Konoplya (yellow card) 90+4'; Eguinaldo (red card) FT | Report | Vanat (yellow card) 70'; Yarmolenko (yellow card) 87'; Shaparenko (yellow card) 90+3' | Stadium: Arena Lviv; Attendance: 1,317; Referee: Oleksii Derevinskyi |

| 18 May 2024 29 | Dynamo Kyiv | 3–1 | Kryvbas Kryvyi Rih | Kyiv |
| 15:30 EEST (UTC+3) | Vanat 4' (pen.); Shaparenko 6'; Kabayev (yellow card) 31'; Bilovar (yellow card) 69'; Dubinchak 81' | Report | Tverdokhlib 19'; Saintini (yellow card) 90+3' | Stadium: Valeriy Lobanovskyi Dynamo Stadium; Attendance: 1,800; Referee: Yaroslav Kozyk |

| 25 May 2024 30 | Rukh Lviv | 1–2 | Dynamo Kyiv | Lviv |
| 15:30 EEST (UTC+3) | Roman (yellow card) 60'; Didyk 63'; Kvasnytsya (yellow card) 67' | Report | Diallo 51' (yellow card) 83'; Tsarenko 76' | Stadium: Arena Lviv; Attendance: 1,500; Referee: Dmytro Panchyshyn |

=== Ukrainian Cup ===
| 27 September 2023 Round of 16 | Obolon Kyiv | 1–0 | Dynamo Kyiv | Kyiv |
| 17:00 EEST (UTC+3) | Sukhanov 57'; Chernenko (yellow card) 84'; Dubko (yellow card) 86'; Kychak (yellow card) 87'; Moroz (yellow card) 90+1' | Report | Buyalskyi (yellow card) 53'; Shepelyev (yellow card) 75'; Dubinchak (yellow card) 90+1' | Stadium: Obolon Arena; Referee: Nazariy Dyord |

=== UEFA Europa Conference League ===
==== Knockout phase ====
| 10 August 2023 Third qualifying round 1st leg | Aris (Greece) | 1–0 | (Ukraine) Dynamo Kyiv | Thessaloniki, Greece |
| 21:15 EEST (UTC+3) | Jules (yellow card) 38'; Montoya (yellow card) 51'; Fabiano (yellow card) 54'; Menéndez (yellow card) 64'; Palma 69' (pen.); Ferrari (yellow card) 90+1' | Report | Tymchyk (yellow card) 3'; Shaparenko (yellow card) 16' | Stadium: Kleanthis Vikelidis Stadium; Attendance: 11,847; Referee: Jarred Gillett (Australia) |

| 17 August 2023 Third qualifying round 2nd leg | Dynamo Kyiv (Ukraine) | 2–1 (a.e.t.) (2–2 agg.) (6–5 p) | (Greece) Aris | Bucharest, Romania (Note: Due to the Russian invasion of Ukraine, Ukrainian teams are required to play their home matches at neutral venues until further notice.) |
| 20:00 EEST (UTC+3) | Voloshyn 45'; Karavayev 85'; Syrota (yellow card) 105+1'; Andriyevskyi (yellow card) 110'; Bushchan (yellow card) 135'; Dubinchak (yellow card) 135' | Report | Đurasek 39'; Pavičić (yellow card) 80' (yellow-red card) 106'; Palma (yellow card) 82'; Matarrita (yellow card) 89'; Odubajo 111'; Christodoulopoulos (yellow card) 135' | Stadium: Rapid-Giulești Stadium; Attendance: 4,461; Referee: Sebastian Gishamer (Austria) |
| | Penalties |
| | Brazhko (penalty scored); Andriyevskyi (penalty scored); Diallo (penalty scored); Parris (penalty missed); Benito (penalty scored); Dyachuk (penalty scored); Dubinchak (penalty scored) | | (penalty scored) Fabiano; (penalty missed) Menéndez; (penalty scored) Rupp; (penalty scored) Ferrari; (penalty scored) Christodoulopoulos; (penalty scored) Zamora; (penalty missed) Odubajo |

| 24 August 2023 Playoff round 1st leg | Dynamo Kyiv (Ukraine) | 2–3 | (Turkey) Beşiktaş | Bucharest, Romania |
| 20:15 EEST (UTC+3) | Shaparenko 60'; Voloshyn 65'; Dubinchak (yellow card) 90+1' | Report | Aboubakar 40' (pen.); Colley 63'; Rosier (yellow card) 79'; Hadžiahmetović (yellow card) 89'; Zaynutdinov 90+4' | Stadium: Rapid-Giulești Stadium; Attendance: Referee: Darren England (England) |

| 31 August 2023 Playoff round 2nd leg | Beşiktaş (Turkey) | 1–0 (4–2 agg.) | (Ukraine) Dynamo Kyiv | Istanbul, Turkey |
| 21:00 EEST (UTC+3) | Bulut (yellow card) 33'; Colley (yellow card) 34'; Aboubakar 52', (yellow card) 53'; Rosier (yellow card) 58'; Muleka (yellow card) 72'; Uçan (yellow card) 82' | Report | Shaparenko (yellow card) 30'; Sydorchuk (yellow card) 39'; Popov (yellow card) 48' | Stadium: Beşiktaş Stadium; Attendance: 33,376; Referee: João Pinheiro (Portugal) |

== Squad statistics ==
As of match played 25 May 2024

=== Appearances and goals ===
| No. | Pos | Nat | Player | Total | | Premier League | | Ukrainian Cup | | UEFA Europa Conference League | |
| No. | Pos | Nat | Player | Apps | Goals | Apps | Goals | Apps | Goals | Apps | Goals |
|---|---|---|---|---|---|---|---|---|---|---|---|
| 1 | GK | (Ukraine) UKR | Heorhiy Bushchan | 30 | 0 | 26 | 0 | 0 | 0 | 4 | 0 |
| 2 | DF | (Ukraine) UKR | Kostyantyn Vivcharenko | 15 | 0 | 12+3 | 0 | 0 | 0 | 0 | 0 |
| 4 | DF | (Ukraine) UKR | Denys Popov | 28 | 1 | 24 | 1 | 1 | 0 | 3 | 0 |
| 6 | MF | (Ukraine) UKR | Volodymyr Brazhko | 29 | 6 | 22+4 | 6 | 1 | 0 | 0+2 | 0 |
| 7 | FW | (Ukraine) UKR | Andriy Yarmolenko | 20 | 8 | 13+4 | 8 | 1 | 0 | 2 | 0 |
| 8 | MF | (Ukraine) UKR | Volodymyr Shepelyev | 23 | 2 | 9+12 | 2 | 0+1 | 0 | 0+1 | 0 |
| 9 | MF | (Ukraine) UKR | Nazar Voloshyn | 31 | 9 | 21+5 | 7 | 0+1 | 0 | 3+1 | 2 |
| 10 | MF | (Ukraine) UKR | Mykola Shaparenko | 26 | 5 | 19+3 | 4 | 0 | 0 | 4 | 1 |
| 11 | FW | (Ukraine) UKR | Vladyslav Vanat | 30 | 14 | 26+1 | 14 | 0 | 0 | 3 | 0 |
| 18 | MF | (Ukraine) UKR | Oleksandr Andriyevskyi | 25 | 1 | 14+8 | 1 | 1 | 0 | 0+2 | 0 |
| 20 | MF | (Ukraine) UKR | Oleksandr Karavayev | 25 | 2 | 14+7 | 2 | 1 | 0 | 2+1 | 0 |
| 21 | FW | (Ukraine) UKR | Vladyslav Supryaha | 8 | 0 | 0+8 | 0 | 0 | 0 | 0 | 0 |
| 22 | MF | (Ukraine) UKR | Vladyslav Kabayev | 26 | 5 | 20+5 | 5 | 0 | 0 | 1 | 0 |
| 23 | DF | (Ukraine) UKR | Navin Malysh | 3 | 0 | 0+3 | 0 | 0 | 0 | 0 | 0 |
| 24 | DF | (Ukraine) UKR | Oleksandr Tymchyk | 27 | 2 | 21+2 | 2 | 0 | 0 | 4 | 0 |
| 25 | DF | (Ukraine) UKR | Maksym Dyachuk | 20 | 1 | 16+3 | 1 | 0 | 0 | 1 | 0 |
| 29 | MF | (Ukraine) UKR | Vitaliy Buyalskyi | 28 | 10 | 20+3 | 10 | 1 | 0 | 4 | 0 |
| 30 | MF | (Senegal) SEN | Samba Diallo | 14 | 1 | 2+8 | 1 | 1 | 0 | 0+3 | 0 |
| 32 | DF | (Ukraine) UKR | Taras Mykhavko | 8 | 0 | 7+1 | 0 | 0 | 0 | 0 | 0 |
| 34 | DF | (Ukraine) UKR | Oleksandr Syrota | 20 | 0 | 10+5 | 0 | 0+1 | 0 | 4 | 0 |
| 35 | GK | (Ukraine) UKR | Ruslan Neshcheret | 5 | 0 | 4 | 0 | 1 | 0 | 0 | 0 |
| 37 | MF | (Ukraine) UKR | Anton Tsarenko | 8 | 1 | 1+6 | 1 | 0 | 0 | 0+1 | 0 |
| 40 | DF | (Ukraine) UKR | Kristian Bilovar | 7 | 0 | 4+2 | 0 | 1 | 0 | 0 | 0 |
| 44 | DF | (Ukraine) UKR | Vladyslav Dubinchak | 27 | 1 | 18+4 | 1 | 1 | 0 | 4 | 0 |
| 77 | MF | (Nigeria) NGR | Benito | 23 | 2 | 4+14 | 2 | 1 | 0 | 1+3 | 0 |
| 99 | FW | (Ukraine) UKR | Matviy Ponomarenko | 8 | 1 | 0+8 | 1 | 0 | 0 | 0 | 0 |
Players away on loan:
| 9 | MF | (Jamaica) JAM | Kaheem Parris | 1 | 0 | 0 | 0 | 0 | 0 | 0+1 | 0 |
| 92 | MF | (North Macedonia) MKD | Reshat Ramadani | 3 | 0 | 0+2 | 0 | 0+1 | 0 | 0 | 0 |
Players who left Dynamo Kyiv during the season:
| 5 | MF | (Ukraine) UKR | Serhiy Sydorchuk | 7 | 1 | 0+3 | 1 | 0 | 0 | 4 | 0 |

=== Goalscorers ===
| Place | Position | Nation | Number | Name | Premier League | Ukrainian Cup | UEFA Europa Conference League | Total |
|---|---|---|---|---|---|---|---|---|
| 1 | FW | (Ukraine) | 11 | Vladyslav Vanat | 14 | 0 | 0 | 14 |
| 2 | MF | (Ukraine) | 29 | Vitaliy Buyalskyi | 10 | 0 | 0 | 10 |
| 3 | MF | (Ukraine) | 9 | Nazar Voloshyn | 7 | 0 | 2 | 9 |
| 4 | FW | (Ukraine) | 7 | Andriy Yarmolenko | 8 | 0 | 0 | 8 |
| 5 | FW | (Ukraine) | 6 | Volodymyr Brazhko | 6 | 0 | 0 | 6 |
| 6 | FW | (Ukraine) | 22 | Vladyslav Kabayev | 5 | 0 | 0 | 5 |
| 6 | FW | (Ukraine) | 10 | Mykola Shaparenko | 4 | 0 | 1 | 5 |
| 8 | FW | (Ukraine) | 20 | Oleksandr Karavayev | 2 | 0 | 1 | 3 |
| 9 | DF | (Ukraine) | 24 | Oleksandr Tymchyk | 2 | 0 | 0 | 2 |
| 9 | FW | (Ukraine) | 8 | Volodymyr Shepelyev | 2 | 0 | 0 | 2 |
| 9 | MF | (Nigeria) | 77 | Benito | 2 | 0 | 0 | 2 |
| 9 | | | | Own goal | 2 | 0 | 0 | 2 |
| 13 | DF | (Ukraine) | 4 | Denys Popov | 1 | 0 | 0 | 1 |
| 13 | DF | (Ukraine) | 25 | Maksym Dyachuk | 1 | 0 | 0 | 1 |
| 13 | DF | (Ukraine) | 44 | Vladyslav Dubinchak | 1 | 0 | 0 | 1 |
| 13 | MF | (Ukraine) | 18 | Oleksandr Andriyevskyi | 1 | 0 | 0 | 1 |
| 13 | MF | (Senegal) | 30 | Samba Diallo | 1 | 0 | 0 | 1 |
| 13 | MF | (Ukraine) | 37 | Anton Tsarenko | 1 | 0 | 0 | 1 |
| 13 | FW | (Ukraine) | 99 | Matviy Ponomarenko | 1 | 0 | 0 | 1 |
| 13 | MF | (Ukraine) | 5 | Serhiy Sydorchuk | 1 | 0 | 0 | 1 |
| TOTALS | | | | | 72 | 0 | 4 | 76 |

=== Clean sheets ===
| Place | Position | Nation | Number | Name | Premier League | Ukrainian Cup | UEFA Europa Conference League | Total |
|---|---|---|---|---|---|---|---|---|
| 1 | GK | (Ukraine) | 1 | Heorhiy Bushchan | 11 | 0 | 0 | 11 |
| TOTALS | | | | | 11 | 0 | 0 | 11 |

=== Disciplinary record ===
| Number | Nation | Position | Name | Premier League | | Ukrainian Cup | | UEFA Europa Conference League | | Total | |
| Number | Nation | Position | Name | Yellow card | Red card | Yellow card | Red card | Yellow card | Red card | Yellow card | Red card |
| 1 | (Ukraine) | GK | Heorhiy Bushchan | 1 | 0 | 0 | 0 | 1 | 0 | 2 | 0 |
| 2 | (Ukraine) | DF | Kostyantyn Vivcharenko | 2 | 0 | 0 | 0 | 0 | 0 | 2 | 0 |
| 4 | (Ukraine) | DF | Denys Popov | 1 | 1 | 0 | 0 | 1 | 0 | 2 | 1 |
| 6 | (Ukraine) | MF | Volodymyr Brazhko | 4 | 0 | 0 | 0 | 0 | 0 | 4 | 0 |
| 7 | (Ukraine) | FW | Andriy Yarmolenko | 3 | 0 | 0 | 0 | 0 | 0 | 3 | 0 |
| 8 | (Ukraine) | MF | Volodymyr Shepelyev | 4 | 0 | 1 | 0 | 0 | 0 | 5 | 0 |
| 9 | (Ukraine) | MF | Nazar Voloshyn | 7 | 1 | 0 | 0 | 0 | 0 | 7 | 1 |
| 10 | (Ukraine) | MF | Mykola Shaparenko | 5 | 0 | 0 | 0 | 2 | 0 | 7 | 0 |
| 11 | (Ukraine) | FW | Vladyslav Vanat | 7 | 1 | 0 | 0 | 0 | 0 | 7 | 1 |
| 18 | (Ukraine) | MF | Oleksandr Andriyevskyi | 3 | 0 | 0 | 0 | 1 | 0 | 4 | 0 |
| 20 | (Ukraine) | DF | Oleksandr Karavayev | 1 | 1 | 0 | 0 | 0 | 0 | 1 | 1 |
| 22 | (Ukraine) | MF | Vladyslav Kabayev | 3 | 0 | 0 | 0 | 0 | 0 | 3 | 0 |
| 24 | (Ukraine) | DF | Oleksandr Tymchyk | 3 | 1 | 0 | 0 | 1 | 0 | 4 | 1 |
| 25 | (Ukraine) | DF | Maksym Dyachuk | 4 | 0 | 0 | 0 | 0 | 0 | 4 | 0 |
| 29 | (Ukraine) | MF | Vitaliy Buyalskyi | 2 | 0 | 1 | 0 | 0 | 0 | 3 | 0 |
| 30 | (Senegal) | MF | Samba Diallo | 2 | 0 | 0 | 0 | 0 | 0 | 2 | 0 |
| 34 | (Ukraine) | DF | Oleksandr Syrota | 3 | 1 | 0 | 0 | 1 | 0 | 4 | 1 |
| 40 | (Ukraine) | DF | Kristian Bilovar | 1 | 0 | 0 | 0 | 0 | 0 | 1 | 0 |
| 44 | (Ukraine) | DF | Vladyslav Dubinchak | 5 | 0 | 1 | 0 | 2 | 0 | 8 | 0 |
| 77 | (Nigeria) | MF | Benito | 1 | 0 | 0 | 0 | 0 | 0 | 1 | 0 |
| 99 | (Ukraine) | FW | Matviy Ponomarenko | 1 | 0 | 0 | 0 | 0 | 0 | 1 | 0 |
Players away on loan:
Players who left Dynamo Kyiv during the season:
| 5 | (Ukraine) | MF | Serhiy Sydorchuk | 1 | 0 | 0 | 0 | 1 | 0 | 2 | 0 |
| | | | TOTALS | 64 | 6 | 3 | 0 | 10 | 0 | 77 | 6 |
