= Navin Malysh =

Ukrainian footballer (born 2003)

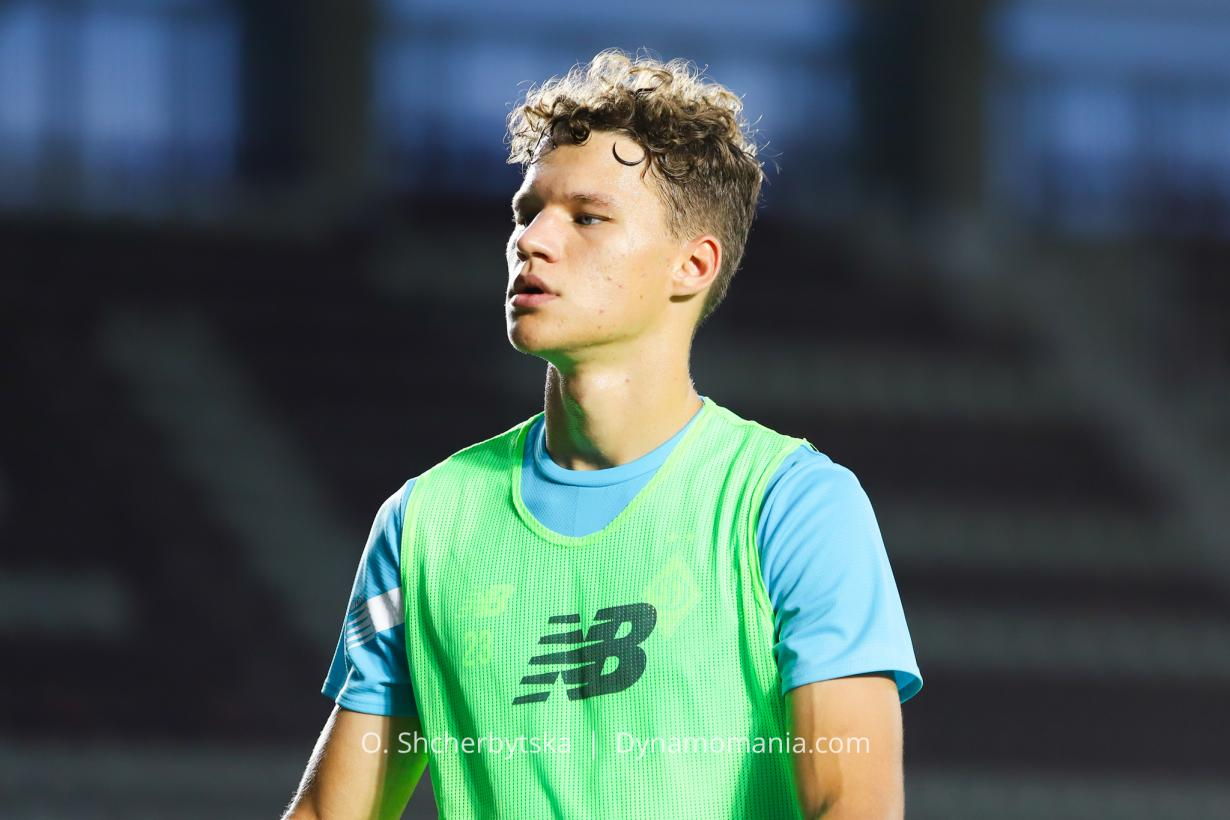

Personal information
- Full name: Navin Volodymyrovych Malysh
- Date of birth: 27 July 2003 (age 23)
- Place of birth: Stara Vyzhivka, Volyn Oblast, Ukraine
- Height: 1.79 m (5 ft 10 in)
- Position: Attacking midfielder

Team information
- Current team: Dynamo Kyiv
- Number: 23

Youth career
- 2016–2017: Dinaz Vyshhorod
- 2018: Dynamo Kyiv
- 2018: RVUFK Kyiv
- 2019–2023: Dynamo Kyiv

Senior career*
Years	Team	Apps	(Gls)
2023–	Dynamo Kyiv	7	(0)
2025	→ Vorskla Poltava (loan)	12	(3)
2025–2026	→ Zorya Luhansk (loan)	17	(1)

International career^{‡}
2021–2022	Ukraine U19	6	(1)
- * Club domestic league appearances and goals as of 19 September 2026 ‡ National team caps and goals as of 14 September 2025

Navin Volodymyrovych Malysh (Ukrainian: Навін Володимирович Малиш; born 27 July 2003) is a Ukrainian professional footballer who plays as an attacking midfielder for Dynamo Kyiv.

== Club career ==
=== Early career ===
He started playing football at the academies of Dynamo Kyiv, Dinaz Vyshhorod and RVUFK Kyiv. Since 2020, he has been playing for Dinamo U-19 in the Ukrainian Youth Football League and the UEFA Youth League, taking part in victories against Bayern Munich U-19 and Barcelona U-19. Malysh won the Ukrainian Under-19 League in 2019 and in 2020.

=== Dynamo Kyiv ===
In 2023, he spent the winter training in Turkey with Dynamo Kyiv senior team, eventually signing with them. On 23 September 2023, he made his debut with his new club in Ukrainian Premier League against LNZ Cherkasy, replacing Vladyslav Dubinchak. On 27 July 2024, he made his debut in UEFA Champions League against Partizan at the Arena Lublin for the 2024–25 UEFA Champions League second qualifying round. On 30 October 2024, he made his debut in Ukrainian Cup against Vorskla Poltava at the Vorskla Stadium in Poltava.

==== Loan to Vorskla Poltava ====
On 3 January 2025, he moved on loan to Vorskla Poltava. On 12 September he scored his first goal against Rukh Lviv giving the victory for his club.

==== Loan to Zorya Luhansk ====
In July 2025 he moved on loan to Zorya Luhansk. On 2 September 2025, he made his debut with his new club against LNZ Cherkasy.

== International career ==
In 2021 he was called up by the Ukraine under-19 team with whom he participated in the unsuccessful qualification for the 2022 UEFA European Under-19 Championship. On 1 June 2022, he also scored against Norway.

== Personal life ==
His older brother Artem Malysh is also a professional football player. In December 2023 he married Yana, receiving the best wishes of Dynamo Kyiv's club.

== Career statistics ==
As of match played 19 September 2026

Club	Season	League			Cup		Europe		Other		Total	
Club	Season	Division	Apps	Goals	Apps	Goals	Apps	Goals	Apps	Goals	Apps	Goals
Dynamo Kyiv	2023–24	Ukrainian Premier League	3	0	0	0	0	0	—		3	0
Dynamo Kyiv	2024–25	Ukrainian Premier League	1	0	1	0	1 (Note: Appearance in UEFA Champions League)	0	—		3	0
Dynamo Kyiv	2026–27	Ukrainian Premier League	5	0	1	0	1 (Note: One appearance in UEFA Europa League)	0	—		7	0
Dynamo Kyiv	Total		9	0	2	0	2	0	—		13	0
Vorskla Poltava (loan)	2024–25	Ukrainian Premier League	12	3	—		—		2 (Note: Appearances in relegation play-offs)	0	14	3
Zorya Luhansk (loan)	2025–26	Ukrainian Premier League	17	1	0	0	—		—		17	1
Career total			38	4	2	0	2	0	2	0	44	4
