= Nazar Voloshyn =

Ukrainian footballer (born 2003)

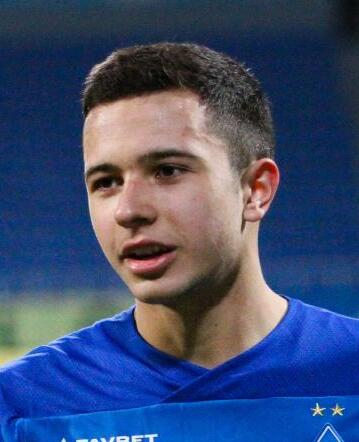

Personal information
- Full name: Nazar Ihorovych Voloshyn
- Date of birth: 17 June 2003 (age 23)
- Place of birth: Kremenchuk, Ukraine
- Height: 1.75 m (5 ft 9 in)
- Position: Right winger

Team information
- Current team: Dynamo Kyiv
- Number: 9

Youth career
- 2013–2016: Metalist Kharkiv
- 2016–2020: Dynamo Kyiv

Senior career*
Years	Team	Apps	(Gls)
2020–	Dynamo Kyiv	95	(14)
2022	→ Kryvbas Kryvyi Rih (loan)	13	(4)

International career^{‡}
2018	Ukraine U15	1	(0)
2019	Ukraine U17	10	(3)
2021–2022	Ukraine U19	6	(0)
2023–2025	Ukraine U21	16	(5)
2024	Ukraine U23	3	(2)
2025–	Ukraine	6	(0)
- * Club domestic league appearances and goals as of 23 October 2026 ‡ National team caps and goals as of 31 March 2026

Nazar Ihorovych Voloshyn (Ukrainian: Назар Ігорович Волошин; born 17 June 2003) is a Ukrainian professional footballer who plays as a right winger for Dynamo Kyiv and the Ukraine national team.

== Career ==
=== Early years ===
Born in Kremenchuk, Voloshyn began his career in the neighbouring Metalist Kharkiv and then continued in the Dynamo Kyiv academy.

=== Dynamo Kyiv ===
He played in the Ukrainian Premier League Reserves and never made his debut for the senior Dynamo Kyiv squad.

==== Loan to Kryvbas Kryvyi Rih ====
In July 2022 Voloshyn signed a one-year loan contract with the newly promoted Ukrainian Premier League side Kryvbas Kryvyi Rih and made his league debut in the losing away match against Kolos Kovalivka on 23 August.

== International career ==
In May 2024, Voloshyn was called up by Ruslan Rotan to the Ukraine Olympic football team squad to play at the 2024 Maurice Revello Tournament in France.

== Career statistics ==
=== Club ===
As of match played 27 October 2026

Appearances and goals by club, season and competition
Club	Season	League			Cup		Europe		Other		Total	
Club	Season	Division	Apps	Goals	Apps	Goals	Apps	Goals	Apps	Goals	Apps	Goals
Dynamo Kyiv	2019–20	Ukrainian Premier League	0	0	0	0	0	0	0	0	0	0
Dynamo Kyiv	2022–23	Ukrainian Premier League	13	3	0	0	0	0	0	0	13	3
Dynamo Kyiv	2023–24	Ukrainian Premier League	26	7	1	0	4 (Note: Appearances in UEFA Conference League)	2	0	0	31	9
Dynamo Kyiv	2024–25	Ukrainian Premier League	24	0	4	2	12 (Note: Six appearances in UEFA Champions League, six appearances in UEFA Europa League)	2	0	0	40	4
Dynamo Kyiv	2025–26	Ukrainian Premier League	27	5	4	1	12 (Note: Four appearances and one goal in UEFA Champions League, two appearances and one goal in UEFA Europa League, six appearances in UEFA Conference League)	2	0	0	44	8
Dynamo Kyiv	2026–27	Ukrainian Premier League	7	0	2	0	5 (Note: Four appearances in UEFA Europa League, one appearance in UEFA Conference League)	0	0	0	14	0
Dynamo Kyiv	Total		95	14	14	4	33	6	0	0	142	24
Kryvbas Kryvyi Rih (loan)	2022–23	Ukrainian Premier League	13	4	—		—		—		13	4
Career total			108	18	14	4	33	6	0	0	155	28

=== International ===
As of match played 31 March 2026

Appearances and goals by national team and year
National team	Year	Apps	Goals
Ukraine	2025	5	0
Ukraine	2026	1	0
Total		6	0

== Honours ==
Dynamo Kyiv

- Ukrainian Premier League: 2024–25
- Ukrainian Cup: 2025–26

Ukraine U-21

- Toulon Tournament: 2024

Individual

- Golden talent of Ukraine: 2022 (U-19)
