= Volodymyr Brazhko =

Ukrainian footballer

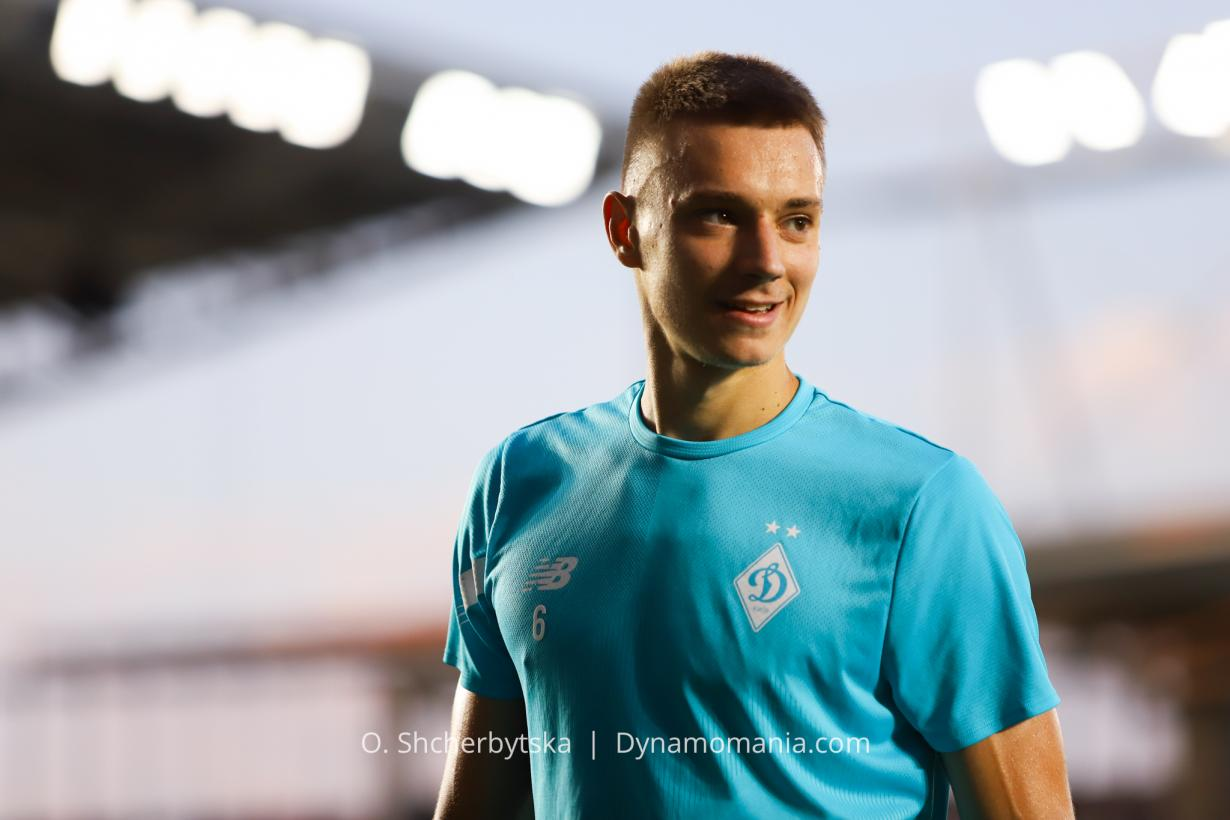
- Brazhko with Dynamo Kyiv in 2023

Personal information
- Full name: Volodymyr Volodymyrovych Brazhko
- Date of birth: 23 January 2002 (age 24)
- Place of birth: Zaporizhzhia, Ukraine
- Height: 1.84 m (6 ft 0 in)
- Position: Defensive midfielder

Team information
- Current team: Dynamo Kyiv
- Number: 6

Youth career
- 2006–2016: Metalurh Zaporizhzhia
- 2016–2019: Dynamo Kyiv

Senior career*
| Years | Team | Apps | (Gls) |
| 2019– | Dynamo Kyiv | 78 | (12) |
| 2022–2023 | → Zorya Luhansk (loan) | 29 | (7) |

International career^{‡}
| 2017 | Ukraine U15 | 1 | (0) |
| 2017–2018 | Ukraine U16 | 6 | (0) |
| 2018–2019 | Ukraine U17 | 6 | (1) |
| 2020–2025 | Ukraine U21 | 26 | (2) |
| 2024– | Ukraine | 11 | (0) |
Medal record
Men's football
Representing Ukraine
UEFA European Under-21 Championship
| Bronze medal – third place | 2023 Georgia-Romania |
- * Club domestic league appearances and goals as of 23 October 2026 ‡ National team caps and goals as of 2 October 2026

Volodymyr Volodymyrovych Brazhko (Ukrainian: Володимир Володимирович Бражко; born 23 January 2002) is a Ukrainian professional footballer who plays as a defensive midfielder for Dynamo Kyiv and the Ukraine national team.

== Career ==
=== Early years ===
Born in Zaporizhzhia, Brazhko began his career at Metalurh Zaporizhzhia from native city (first trainer Andriy Maksymenko) from the age 4, and then continued in the Dynamo Kyiv academy.

=== Dynamo Kyiv ===
He played in the Ukrainian Premier League Reserves and never made his debut for the senior Dynamo Kyiv squad.

==== Loan to Zorya Luhansk ====
In July 2022 Brazhko signed a one-year loan contract with Ukrainian Premier League side Zorya Luhansk and made his debut for this club in the Ukrainian Premier League as a second half-time substituted player in a home winning match against Vorskla Poltava on 23 August 2022.

== International career ==
Brazhko was a part of the Ukraine national under-21 football team squad that qualified to the UEFA European Under-21 Championship semi final.

Brazhko made his debut for the senior Ukraine national team on 21 March 2024 in a UEFA Euro 2024 qualifying play-offs game against Bosnia and Herzegovina.

== Career statistics ==
=== Club ===
As of match played 27 October 2026

Appearances and goals by club, season and competition
| Club | Season | League | | | Cup | | Continental | | Other | | Total | |
| Club | Season | Division | Apps | Goals | Apps | Goals | Apps | Goals | Apps | Goals | Apps | Goals |
|---|---|---|---|---|---|---|---|---|---|---|---|---|
| Dynamo Kyiv | 2019–20 | Ukrainian Premier League | 0 | 0 | 0 | 0 | 0 | 0 | 0 | 0 | 0 | 0 |
| Dynamo Kyiv | 2023–24 | Ukrainian Premier League | 26 | 6 | 1 | 0 | 3 (Note: Appearances in UEFA Conference League) | 0 | — | | 30 | 6 |
| Dynamo Kyiv | 2024–25 | Ukrainian Premier League | 22 | 3 | 4 | 1 | 11 (Note: Five appearances and one goal in UEFA Champions League, six appearances in UEFA Europa League) | 1 | — | | 37 | 5 |
| Dynamo Kyiv | 2025–26 | Ukrainian Premier League | 23 | 3 | 5 | 0 | 8 (Note: Four appearances and one goal in UEFA Champions League, two appearances in UEFA Europa League, two appearances in UEFA Conference League) | 1 | — | | 36 | 4 |
| Dynamo Kyiv | 2026–27 | Ukrainian Premier League | 7 | 2 | 2 | 0 | 6 (Note: Four appearances and one goal in UEFA Europa League, two appearances in UEFA Conference League) | 1 | — | | 15 | 3 |
| Dynamo Kyiv | Total | | 78 | 14 | 12 | 1 | 28 | 3 | — | | 118 | 18 |
| Zorya Luhansk (loan) | 2022–23 | Ukrainian Premier League | 29 | 7 | — | | 0 | 0 | — | | 29 | 7 |
| Career total | | | 107 | 21 | 12 | 1 | 28 | 3 | 0 | 0 | 147 | 25 |

=== International ===
As of match played 2 October 2026

Appearances and goals by national team and year
| National team | Year | Apps | Goals |
|---|---|---|---|
| Ukraine | 2024 | 9 | 0 |
| Ukraine | 2025 | 0 | 0 |
| Ukraine | 2026 | 2 | 0 |
| Total | | 11 | 0 |

== Honours ==
Dynamo Kyiv

- Ukrainian Premier League: 2024–25
- Ukrainian Cup: 2025–26

Individual

- Ukrainian Premier League Player of the Month: November 2023, September 2024
