= Pierre Mounguengue =

French footballer (born 2008)

Personal information
- Full name: Pierre Messie Mounguengue
- Date of birth: 3 January 2008 (age 18)
- Place of birth: Évry-Courcouronnes, France
- Height: 1.82 m (6 ft 0 in)
- Position: Forward

Team information
- Current team: Dynamo Kyiv
- Number: 99

Youth career
- 2014–2018: Évry
- 2018–2019: Mya Futsal Essonne
- 2019–2020: Évry
- 2020–2021: US Villejuif
- 2021–2026: Paris Saint-Germain

Senior career*
Years	Team	Apps	(Gls)
2026	Paris Saint-Germain	1	(0)
2026–	Dynamo Kyiv	2	(0)

International career^{‡}
2025–	France U17	5	(1)
2025–	France U18	1	(0)
2026–	France U19	3	(0)
- * Club domestic league appearances and goals as of 19:00, 31 August 2026 (UTC) ‡ National team caps and goals as of 20:16, 2 May 2026 (UTC)

Pierre Messie Mounguengue (born 3 January 2008) is a French professional footballer who plays as a forward for Ukrainian Premier League club Dynamo Kyiv.

== Club career ==
=== Paris Saint-Germain ===
Mounguengue joined the Paris Saint-Germain Youth Academy in 2021, at the age of 13. In the 2025–26 season, he experienced a breakthrough campaign with the under-19s, notably scoring five goals and assisting another five in PSG's run to the UEFA Youth League semi-finals. On 2 May 2026, he made his professional debut in Ligue 1 as a substitute in a 2–2 home draw against Lorient. In the match, he lost a ball that led to an equalizing goal by Aiyegun Tosin.

=== Dynamo Kyiv ===
On 24 June 2026, Mounguengue signed a 3-year contract with Ukrainian Premier League club Dynamo Kyiv.

== International career ==
Mounguengue is a youth international for France, having made his debut with the under-18s in 2025.

== Personal life ==
Born in France, Mounguengue is of Gabonese descent.

== Career statistics ==
As of match played 10 September 2026

Appearances and goals by club, season and competition
Club	Season	League			National cup		Europe		Other		Total	
Club	Season	Division	Apps	Goals	Apps	Goals	Apps	Goals	Apps	Goals	Apps	Goals
Paris Saint-Germain	2025–26	Ligue 1	1	0	0	0	0	0	0	0	1	0
Dynamo Kyiv	2026–27	Ukrainian Premier League	2	0	1	0	1 (Note: Appearance in UEFA Europa League)	0	—		4	0
Career total			3	0	1	0	1	0	0	0	5	0

== Honours ==
Paris Saint-Germain U19

- Championnat National U19: 2024–25, 2025–26

Paris Saint-Germain U18

- Coupe Gambardella: 2025–26

Paris Saint-Germain

- Ligue 1: 2025–26
