= Popivka, Konotop Raion, Sumy Oblast =

Village in Sumy Oblast, Ukraine

Popivka Попівка
- Village
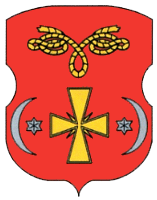
- Coat of arms

- Location of Popivka in Sumy Oblast Location of Popivka in Ukraine
- Coordinates: 51°14′01″N 33°06′55″E
- Country: Ukraine
- Oblast: Sumy Oblast
- Raion: Konotop Raion
- Hromada: Popivka rural hromada
- First mentioned: 17th century

Population
  - Total: 1,679

Popivka (Ukrainian: Попівка; Russian: Поповка, romanized: Popovka) is a village in Konotop Raion, Sumy Oblast, Ukraine. It is the capital of Popivka rural hromada, one of the hromadas of Ukraine. Its population is 4,345 (as of 2023).

== History ==
Popivka was first mentioned in the first half of the 17th century. It became part of the Russian Soviet Federative Socialist Republic in November 1917. 1,103 residents of the village were killed during World War II by Nazi German forces.

Popivka is locally notable for its "Journalist Street", which commemorates local journalists. It is the only monument to journalists in all of Sumy Oblast as of 2014.

== Notable people ==
- Mykhailo Hudenko, Hero of the Soviet Union.
- Anatoly Kovarsky, Soviet agronomist, geneticist, and botanist
- Fyodor Leontovich, Russian lawyer and professor
- Pavlo Suprun, Ukrainian kobzar and pianist
- Stepan Osypenko, member of the Central Rada
- Anton Tsarenko, Ukrainian footballer
