= Kostyantyn Vivcharenko =

Ukrainian footballer

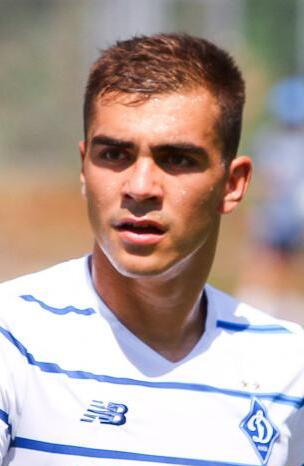

Personal information
- Full name: Kostyantyn Ruslanovych Vivcharenko
- Date of birth: 10 June 2002 (age 24)
- Place of birth: Odesa, Ukraine
- Height: 1.78 m (5 ft 10 in)
- Position: Left-back

Team information
- Current team: Dynamo Kyiv
- Number: 2

Youth career
- 2014–2015: Chornomorets Odesa
- 2015–2019: Dynamo Kyiv

Senior career*
| Years | Team | Apps | (Gls) |
| 2018– | Dynamo Kyiv | 74 | (3) |

International career^{‡}
| 2017 | Ukraine U15 | 2 | (0) |
| 2017–2018 | Ukraine U16 | 9 | (1) |
| 2018–2019 | Ukraine U17 | 6 | (0) |
| 2021–2025 | Ukraine U21 | 33 | (2) |
Medal record
Men's football
Representing Ukraine
UEFA European Under-21 Championship
| Bronze medal – third place | 2023 Georgia-Romania |
- * Club domestic league appearances and goals as of 13 May 2026 ‡ National team caps and goals as of 19 June 2025

Kostyantyn Ruslanovych Vivcharenko (Ukrainian: Костянтин Русланович Вівчаренко; born 10 June 2002) is a Ukrainian professional footballer who plays as a left-back for Ukrainian Premier League club Dynamo Kyiv.

== Club career ==
=== Early years ===
Born in Odesa, Vivcharnko is a product of Chornomorets Odesa and Dynamo Kyiv academies. He played initially for Dynamo Kyiv in the Ukrainian Premier League Reserves.

=== Dynamo Kyiv ===
In August 2020, he was promoted to the senior squad, and was an unused substitution player in the winning Ukrainian Super Cup match against Shakhtar Donetsk on 25 August 2020. Vivcharenko made his debut for Dynamo Kyiv only on 27 July 2022, playing as an extra-time substitution player in a winning match against Turkish club Fenerbahçe in the 2022–23 UEFA Champions League second qualifying round.

== Career statistics ==
=== Club ===
As of match played 16 July 2026

| Club | Season | League | | | Ukrainian Cup | | Europe | | Total | |
| Club | Season | Division | Apps | Goals | Apps | Goals | Apps | Goals | Apps | Goals |
|---|---|---|---|---|---|---|---|---|---|---|
| Dynamo Kyiv | 2022–23 | Ukrainian Premier League | 22 | 2 | 0 | 0 | 10 (Note: Five appearances and one goal in UEFA Champions League, five appearances in UEFA Europa League) | 1 | 32 | 3 |
| Dynamo Kyiv | 2023–24 | Ukrainian Premier League | 15 | 0 | 0 | 0 | 0 | 0 | 15 | 0 |
| Dynamo Kyiv | 2024–25 | Ukrainian Premier League | 17 | 1 | 4 | 0 | 7 (Note: Two appearances in UEFA Champions League, five appearances in UEFA Europa League) | 0 | 28 | 1 |
| Dynamo Kyiv | 2025–26 | Ukrainian Premier League | 20 | 0 | 4 | 0 | 5 (Note: Two appearances in UEFA Champions League, one appearance in UEFA Europa League, two appearances in UEFA Conference League) | 0 | 29 | 0 |
| Dynamo Kyiv | 2026–27 | Ukrainian Premier League | 0 | 0 | 0 | 0 | 1 (Note: One appearance in UEFA Europa League) | 0 | 1 | 0 |
| Career total | | | 74 | 3 | 8 | 0 | 23 | 1 | 98 | 4 |

== Honours ==
Dynamo Kyiv

- Ukrainian Premier League: 2024–25
- Ukrainian Cup: 2025–26
