= Aliou Thiaré =

Senegalese footballer (born 2003)

Personal information
- Full name: Aliou Thiaré
- Date of birth: 20 December 2003 (age 22)
- Place of birth: Diouloulou, Senegal
- Height: 1.94 m (6 ft 4 in)
- Position: Defender

Team information
- Current team: Dynamo Kyiv
- Number: 66

Youth career
- –2019: Diambars FC

Senior career*
Years	Team	Apps	(Gls)
2019–2023	Diambars FC	3	(0)
2023–2025	Le Havre AC	0	(0)
2023–2025	→ Le Havre AC B (loan)	16	(3)
2024–2025	→ Nancy Lorraine (loan)	29	(0)
2025–	Dynamo Kyiv	10	(1)
- * Club domestic league appearances and goals

Aliou Thiaré (born 20 December 2003) is a Senegalese professional footballer who plays as a center back for Ukrainian Premier League club Dynamo Kyiv.

== Club career ==
Thiaré is a product of Diambars FC. In 2021, while at Diambars FC, he made his continental debut in the 2021–22 CAF Confederation Cup. Diambars FC did not advance past the qualification rounds. In 2023, Thiaré went abroad, signing with French side Le Havre AC; however, he did not play for the first squad, playing mostly for their reserves in 2023–24 Championnat National 3, Group F.

In 2024, Thiaré was loaned out to Nancy Lorraine, where he gained most of his playing time and with which he became a winner of the 2024–25 Championnat National.

On September 2, 2025, FC Dynamo Kyiv announced that it signed a 4-year contract with the young defender.
