= Kristian Bilovar =

Ukrainian footballer

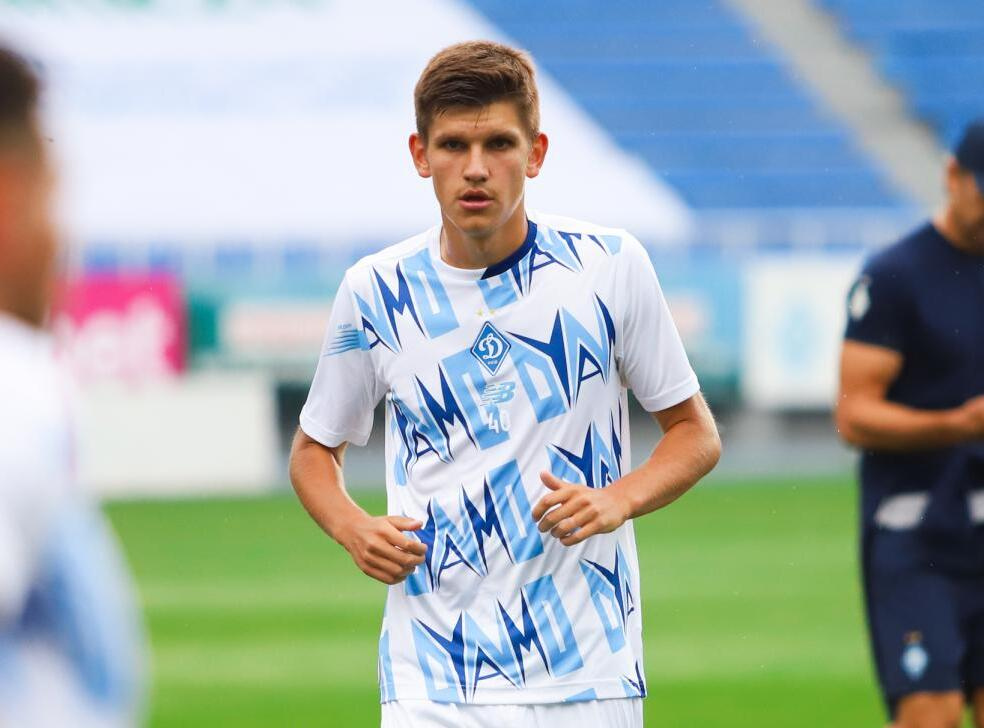

Personal information
- Full name: Kristian Ruslanovych Bilovar
- Date of birth: 5 February 2001 (age 25)
- Place of birth: Debrecen, Hungary
- Height: 1.91 m (6 ft 3 in)
- Position: Centre-back

Team information
- Current team: Dynamo Kyiv
- Number: 40

Youth career
- 2014–2015: SDYuSShOR Uzhhorod
- 2015–2021: Dynamo Kyiv

Senior career*
Years	Team	Apps	(Gls)
2021–	Dynamo Kyiv	42	(0)
2021	→ Desna Chernihiv (loan)	1	(0)
2021–2022	→ Chornomorets Odesa (loan)	8	(0)
2022–2023	→ AEL Limassol (loan)	28	(0)

International career^{‡}
2017–2018	Ukraine U17	5	(1)
2018	Ukraine U18	2	(0)
2018–2019	Ukraine U19	5	(0)
- * Club domestic league appearances and goals as of 16 August 2026 ‡ National team caps and goals as of 9 August 2021

Kristian Ruslanovych Bilovar (Ukrainian: Крістіан Русланович Біловар; born 5 February 2001) is a Ukrainian professional footballer who plays as a defender for Dynamo Kyiv.

== Club career ==
=== Dynamo Kyiv ===
Kristian Bilovar is a youth product of Dynamo Kyiv, winning the Ukrainian Under-19 League in 2019 and in 2020 before signing a professional contract ahead of the |2020–21 season.

==== Loan to Desna Chernihiv ====
In July 2021 he moved on loan to Desna Chernihiv in the Ukrainian Premier League. On 25 July he made his league debut at home against Chornomorets Odesa at the Chernihiv Stadium, replacing Levan Arveladze in the 87th minute.

==== Loan to Chornomorets Odesa ====
On 3 September 2021 he moved on loan to Chornomorets Odesa. On 23 September he played in the Ukrainian Cup against Prykarpattia Ivano-Frankivsk, seeing Odesa through to the round of 16.

==== Loan to AEL Limassol ====
In August 2022 he moved on loan to AEL Limassol in the Cypriot First Division for the 2022–23 season.

== Career statistics ==
=== Club ===
As of match played 16 August 2026

Appearances and goals by club, season and competition
Club	Season	League			Cup		Europe		Other		Total	
Club	Season	Division	Apps	Goals	Apps	Goals	Apps	Goals	Apps	Goals	Apps	Goals
Dynamo Kyiv	2020–21	Ukrainian Premier League	0	0	0	0	0	0	0	0	0	0
Dynamo Kyiv	2022–23	Ukrainian Premier League	0	0	0	0	0	0	0	0	0	0
Dynamo Kyiv	2023–24	Ukrainian Premier League	6	0	1	0	0	0	0	0	7	0
Dynamo Kyiv	2024–25	Ukrainian Premier League	16	0	2	0	10 (Note: Seven appearances in UEFA Champions League, three appearances in UEFA Europa League)	0	0	0	28	0
Dynamo Kyiv	2025–26	Ukrainian Premier League	18	0	3	0	5 (Note: Two appearances in UEFA Champions League, two appearances in UEFA Europa League, one appearance in UEFA Conference League)	0	0	0	26	0
Dynamo Kyiv	2026–27	Ukrainian Premier League	2	0	0	0	5 (Note: Four appearances in UEFA Europa League, one appearance in UEFA Conference League)	0	—		7	0
Dynamo Kyiv	Total		42	0	6	0	20	0	0	0	68	0
Desna Chernihiv (loan)	2021–22	Ukrainian Premier League	1	0	0	0	0	0	0	0	1	0
Chornomorets Odesa (loan)	2021–22	Ukrainian Premier League	8	0	2	0	0	0	0	0	10	0
AEL Limassol (loan)	2022–23	Cypriot First Division	28	0	2	0	0	0	0	0	30	0
Career total			79	0	10	0	20	0	0	0	109	0

== Honours ==
Dynamo Kyiv

- Ukrainian Premier League: 2024–25
- Ukrainian Cup: 2025–26

AEL Limassol

- Cypriot Cup: Runner-Up 2022–23
