= Taras Moroz =

Ukrainian footballer (born 1996)

Personal information
- Full name: Taras Ruslanovych Moroz
- Date of birth: 21 February 1996 (age 30)
- Place of birth: Velyki Birky, Ukraine
- Height: 1.82 m (6 ft 0 in)
- Position: Defensive midfielder

Team information
- Current team: Obolon Kyiv
- Number: 4

Youth career
- 2009–2012: Ternopil
- 2012–2013: Sevastopol-SDYuShOR-5

Senior career*
Years	Team	Apps	(Gls)
2013–2014	Sevastopol	0	(0)
2013	→ Sevastopol-3	0	(0)
2014–2017	Nyva Terebovlya	34	(7)
2017–2022	Nyva Ternopil	104	(0)
2022–	Obolon Kyiv	74	(2)
- * Club domestic league appearances and goals as of 3 June 2026

Taras Ruslanovych Moroz (Ukrainian: Тарас Русланович Мороз; born 21 February 1996) is a Ukrainian professional footballer who plays as a defensive midfielder for Ukrainian club Obolon Kyiv.
