= Ruslan Neshcheret =

Ukrainian footballer

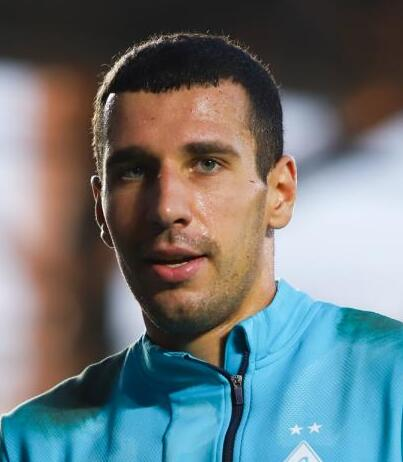

Personal information
- Full name: Ruslan Oleksiyovych Neshcheret
- Date of birth: 22 January 2002 (age 24)
- Place of birth: Mukachevo, Ukraine
- Height: 1.90 m (6 ft 3 in)
- Position: Goalkeeper

Team information
- Current team: Dynamo Kyiv
- Number: 35

Youth career
- 2010–2014: Youth Sportive School Mukachevo
- 2014–2019: Dynamo Kyiv

Senior career*
Years	Team	Apps	(Gls)
2019–	Dynamo Kyiv	68	(0)

International career^{‡}
2017	Ukraine U15	1	(0)
2017	Ukraine U16	2	(0)
2017–2019	Ukraine U17	7	(0)
2019–2025	Ukraine U21	28	(0)
2024	Ukraine U23	2	(0)
Medal record
Men's football
Representing Ukraine
UEFA European Under-21 Championship
Bronze medal – third place	2023 Georgia-Romania
- * Club domestic league appearances and goals as of 18 October 2026 ‡ National team caps and goals as of 19 June 2025

Ruslan Oleksiyovych Neshcheret (Ukrainian: Руслан Олексійович Нещерет; born 22 January 2002) is a Ukrainian professional footballer who plays as a goalkeeper for Dynamo Kyiv.

== Career ==
Neshcheret is a product of his native Mukachevo and Dynamo Kyiv academies.

In July 2019, he was promoted to the Dynamo Kyiv main squad and made his debut in the Ukrainian Premier League on 31 October 2020, starting in an away match against Dnipro-1. He participated in the 2019–20 UEFA Youth League, where he managed to keep 4 clean sheets. On 4 November 2020, he made his UEFA Champions League debut in a 2–1 defeat against Barcelona in the 2020–21 season, in which he made 12 saves to be the joint-third most saves in a single match in that competition.

== International career ==
In May 2024, Neshcheret was called up by Ruslan Rotan to the Ukraine Olympic football team squad to play at the 2024 Maurice Revello Tournament in France.

== Career statistics ==
As of match played 18 October 2026

Appearances and goals by club, season and competition
Club	Season	League			Cup		Europe		Other		Total	
Club	Season	Division	Apps	Goals	Apps	Goals	Apps	Goals	Apps	Goals	Apps	Goals
Dynamo Kyiv	2020–21	Ukrainian Premier League	3	0	0	0	1 (Note: Appearances in UEFA Champions League)	0	—		4	0
Dynamo Kyiv	2021–22	Ukrainian Premier League	0	0	0	0	0	0	—		0	0
Dynamo Kyiv	2022–23	Ukrainian Premier League	20	0	0	0	2 (Note: Appearances in UEFA Europa League)	0	—		22	0
Dynamo Kyiv	2023–24	Ukrainian Premier League	4	0	1	0	0	0	—		5	0
Dynamo Kyiv	2024–25	Ukrainian Premier League	13	0	2	0	3	0	—		18	0
Dynamo Kyiv	2025–26	Ukrainian Premier League	27	0	4	0	12 (Note: Four appearances in UEFA Champions League, two appearances in UEFA Europa League, six appearances in UEFA Conference League)	0	—		43	0
Dynamo Kyiv	2026–27	Ukrainian Premier League	1	0	0	0	3 (Note: Three appearances in UEFA Europa League)	0	—		4	0
Career total			68	0	7	0	21	0	0	0	96	0

== Honours ==
Dynamo Kyiv

- Ukrainian Premier League: 2020–21, 2024–25
- Ukrainian Cup: 2019–20, 2020–21, 2025–26

Ukraine

- Toulon Tournament: 2024
