= Anton Tsarenko =

Ukrainian footballer

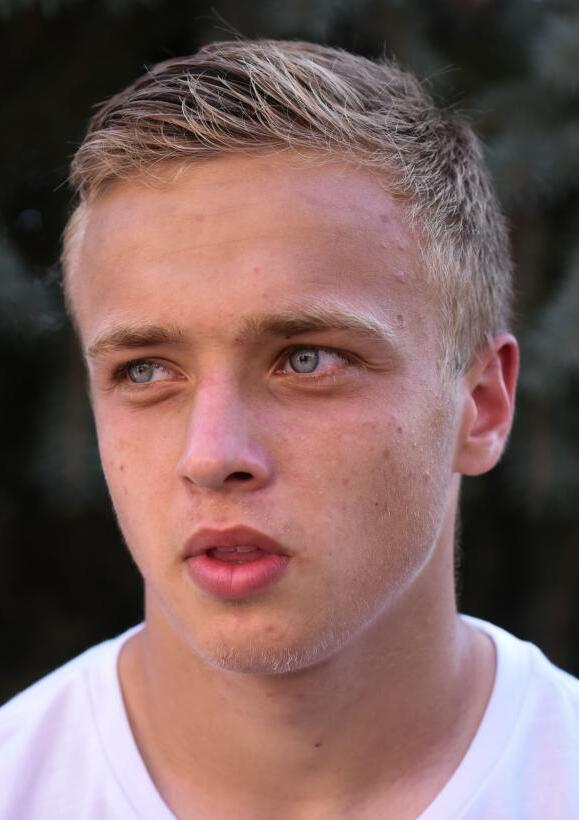
- Tsarenko in 2021

Personal information
- Full name: Anton Oleksandrovych Tsarenko
- Date of birth: 17 June 2004 (age 22)
- Place of birth: Popivka, Konotop Raion, Sumy Oblast, Ukraine
- Height: 1.63 m (5 ft 4 in)
- Position: Attacking midfielder

Team information
- Current team: Blau-Weiß Linz (on loan from Dynamo Kyiv)
- Number: 30

Youth career
- 2017–2022: Dynamo Kyiv

Senior career*
Years	Team	Apps	(Gls)
2022–	Dynamo Kyiv	18	(2)
2024–2026	→ Lechia Gdańsk (loan)	36	(2)
2026–	→ Blau-Weiß Linz (loan)	5	(2)

International career^{‡}
2019	Ukraine U16	2	(0)
2022–2023	Ukraine U19	9	(3)
2024–	Ukraine U21	11	(0)
- * Club domestic league appearances and goals as of 10:13, 18 September 2026 (UTC) ‡ National team caps and goals as of 15:33, 8 June 2026 (UTC)

Anton Oleksandrovych Tsarenko (Ukrainian: Антон Олександрович Царенко; born 17 June 2004) is a Ukrainian professional footballer who plays as an attacking midfielder for 2. Liga club Blau-Weiß Linz, on loan from Dynamo Kyiv.

== Club career ==
Tsarenko is a product of the Dynamo Kyiv academy and has played for the club's reserve team in the Ukrainian Premier League Reserves.

In January 2022, he signed a three-year deal with Dynamo, and participated in the summer training camp with the main team squad. Tsarenko made his senior debut for Dynamo Kyiv on 17 August 2022, playing as a second half-time substitution player in a loss against Portuguese club Benfica in the 2022–23 UEFA Champions League play-off round.

On 13 August 2024, Tsarenko moved to Polish Ekstraklasa club Lechia Gdańsk on a season-long loan. On 2 July 2025, his loan was extended for another year.

== Career statistics ==
As of match played 23 May 2026

Appearances and goals by club, season and competition
Club	Season	League			National cup (Note: Includes Polish Cup)		Continental		Other		Total	
Club	Season	Division	Apps	Goals	Apps	Goals	Apps	Goals	Apps	Goals	Apps	Goals
Dynamo Kyiv	2022–23	Ukrainian Premier League	11	1	0	0	2 (Note: Appearances in UEFA Champions League)	0	0	0	13	1
Dynamo Kyiv	2023–24	Ukrainian Premier League	7	1	0	0	1 (Note: Appearance in UEFA Europa Conference League)	0	0	0	8	1
Dynamo Kyiv	Total		18	2	0	0	3	0	0	0	21	2
Lechia Gdańsk (loan)	2024–25	Ekstraklasa	29	2	1	0	—		—		30	2
Lechia Gdańsk (loan)	2025–26	Ekstraklasa	7	0	1	0	—		—		8	0
Lechia Gdańsk (loan)	Total		36	2	2	0	—		—		38	2
Career total			54	4	2	0	3	0	0	0	59	4
