= Vladyslav Dubinchak =

Ukrainian footballer

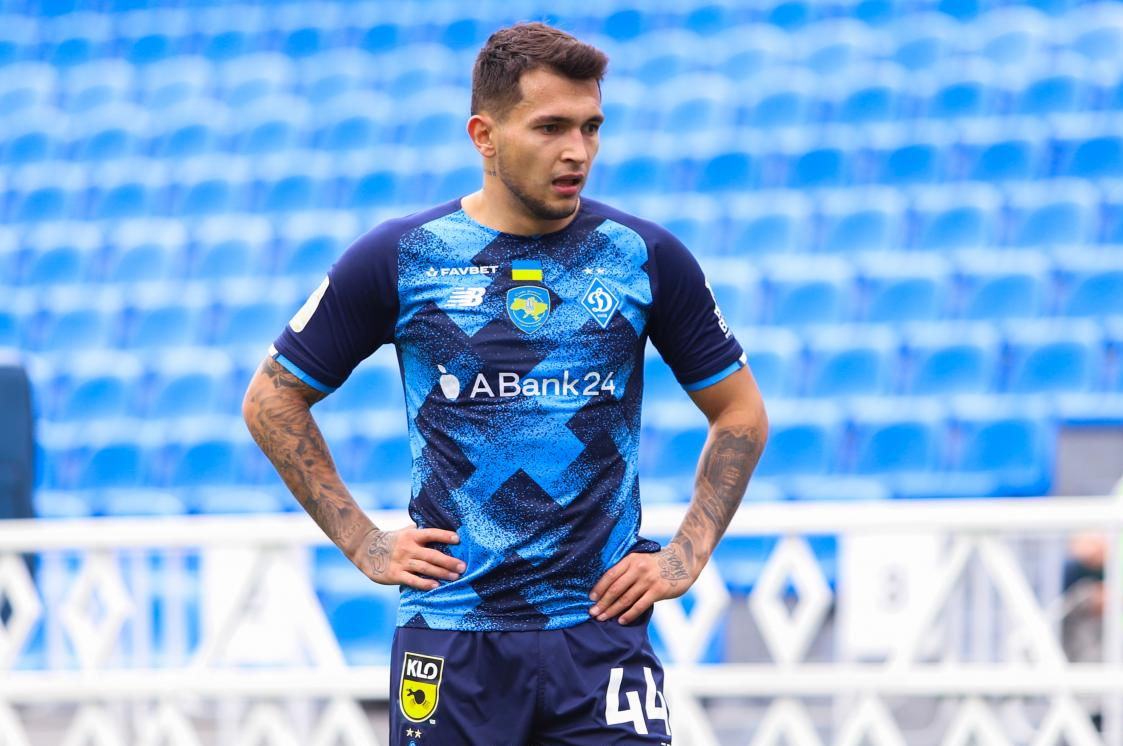

Personal information
- Full name: Vladyslav Yuriyovych Dubinchak
- Date of birth: 1 July 1998 (age 28)
- Place of birth: Tomashpil, Ukraine
- Height: 1.73 m (5 ft 8 in)
- Position: Left-back

Team information
- Current team: Dynamo Kyiv
- Number: 44

Youth career
- 2011–2014: BRW-VIK Volodymyr-Volynskyi
- 2014–2016: Dynamo Kyiv

Senior career*
Years	Team	Apps	(Gls)
2016–	Dynamo Kyiv	83	(1)
2018–2019	→ Arsenal Kyiv (loan)	28	(0)
2019–2020	→ Karpaty Lviv (loan)	19	(0)
2020–2021	→ Dnipro-1 (loan)	38	(0)

International career^{‡}
2013–2015	Ukraine U17	13	(3)
2015–2016	Ukraine U18	11	(2)
2016–2017	Ukraine U19	9	(1)
2018–2020	Ukraine U21	12	(0)
- * Club domestic league appearances and goals as of 23 October 2026 ‡ National team caps and goals as of 6 October 2021

Vladyslav Yuriyovych Dubinchak (Ukrainian: Владисла́в Ю́рійович Дубінча́к; born 1 July 1998) is a Ukrainian professional footballer who plays as a left-back for the Ukrainian Premier League club Dynamo Kyiv.

== Career statistics ==
As of match played 27 October 2026

Appearances and goals by club, season and competition
Club	Season	League			Cup		Continental		Other		Total	
Club	Season	Division	Apps	Goals	Apps	Goals	Apps	Goals	Apps	Goals	Apps	Goals
Arsenal Kyiv (loan)	2018–19	Ukrainian Premier League	28	0	1	0	—		—		29	0
Arsenal Kyiv (loan)	Total		28	0	1	0	—		—		29	0
Karpaty Lviv (loan)	2019–20	Ukrainian Premier League	19	0	1	0	—		—		20	0
Karpaty Lviv (loan)	Total		19	0	1	0	—		—		20	0
Dnipro-1 (loan)	2020–21	Ukrainian Premier League	22	0	3	0	—		—		25	0
Dnipro-1 (loan)	2021–22	Ukrainian Premier League	16	0	2	0	—		—		18	0
Dnipro-1 (loan)	Total		38	0	5	0	—		—		43	0
Dynamo Kyiv	2022–23	Ukrainian Premier League	18	0	0	0	10 (Note: Six appearances in UEFA Champions League, four appearances in UEFA Europa League)	0	0	0	28	0
Dynamo Kyiv	2023–24	Ukrainian Premier League	22	1	1	0	4 (Note: Appearances in UEFA Conference League)	0	0	0	27	1
Dynamo Kyiv	2024–25	Ukrainian Premier League	21	0	2	0	8 (Note: Four appearances in UEFA Champions League, four appearances in UEFA Europa League)	0	0	0	31	0
Dynamo Kyiv	2025–26	Ukrainian Premier League	14	0	2	0	8 (Note: Three appearances in UEFA Champions League, one appearance in UEFA Europa League, four appearances in UEFA Conference League)	0	0	0	24	0
Dynamo Kyiv	2026–27	Ukrainian Premier League	8	0	2	0	5 (Note: Three appearances in UEFA Europa League, two appearances in UEFA Conference League)	0	—		15	0
Dynamo Kyiv	Total		83	1	7	0	35	0	0	0	125	1
Career total			168	1	14	0	35	0	0	0	217	1
