= Samba Diallo =

Senegalese footballer (born 2003)

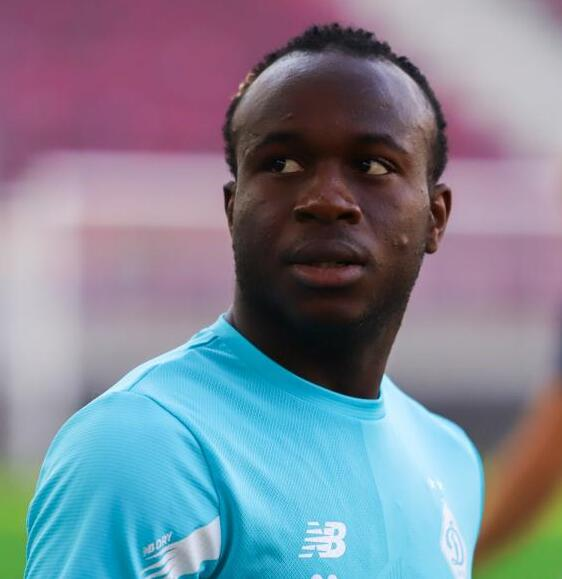

Personal information
- Full name: Samba Diallo
- Date of birth: 5 January 2003 (age 23)
- Place of birth: Ziguinchor, Senegal
- Height: 1.68 m (5 ft 6 in)
- Position: Left winger

Team information
- Current team: Rukh Lviv (on loan from Dynamo Kyiv)
- Number: 14

Youth career
- –2021: AF Darou Salam

Senior career*
Years	Team	Apps	(Gls)
2021–	Dynamo Kyiv	11	(1)
2024–2025	→ Hapoel Jerusalem (loan)	19	(3)
2026–	→ Rukh Lviv (loan)	0	(0)

International career^{‡}
2019	Senegal U17	7	(1)
2019–2023	Senegal U20	10	(2)
2023–	Senegal	1	(0)
- * Club domestic league appearances and goals as of 12 March 2026 ‡ National team caps and goals as of 9 September 2023

Samba Diallo (born 5 January 2003) is a Senegalese professional footballer who plays as a left winger for Ukrainian Premier League club Rukh Lviv on loan from Dynamo Kyiv, and the Senegal national team.

== Club career ==
Samba is a product of the local AF Darou Salam, but in July 2021 he signed a contract with Ukrainian side Dynamo Kyiv and played in the Ukrainian Premier League Reserves.

He made his debut for Dynamo Kyiv on 28 October 2022, playing as a second-half substitute in a draw away to Cypriot club AEK Larnaca in the 2022–23 UEFA Europa League group stage.

On 13 September 2024 loaned to the Israeli Premier League club Hapoel Jerusalem.
