= Maksym Dyachuk =

Ukrainian footballer

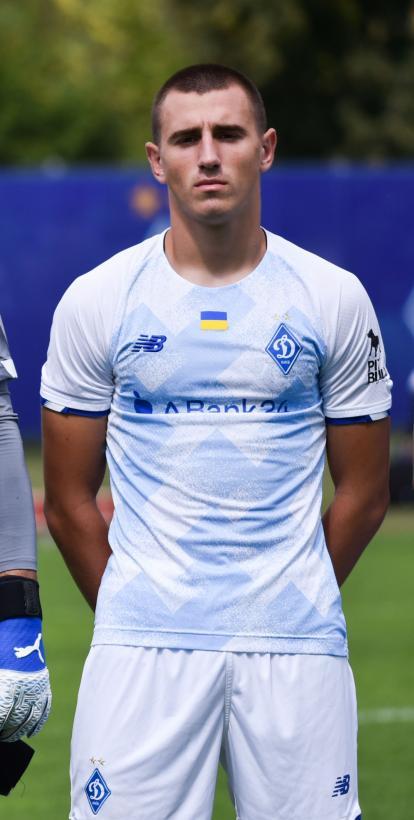
- Dyachuk in 2021

Personal information
- Full name: Maksym Rostyslavovych Dyachuk
- Date of birth: 21 July 2003 (age 23)
- Place of birth: Yasinia, Ukraine
- Height: 1.87 m (6 ft 2 in)
- Position: Centre-back

Team information
- Current team: Baník Ostrava (on loan from Dynamo Kyiv)

Youth career
- 2014: DYuSSh Rakhiv
- 2016–2017: Nika Ivano-Frankivsk
- 2017–2019: Skala Morshyn
- 2019–2020: Dynamo Kyiv

Senior career*
Years	Team	Apps	(Gls)
2020–	Dynamo Kyiv	41	(1)
2022–2023	→ Oleksandriya (loan)	5	(0)
2025–2026	→ Lechia Gdańsk (loan)	26	(1)
2026–	→ Baník Ostrava (loan)	0	(0)

International career
2019	Ukraine U17	8	(0)
2024	Ukraine U23	1	(0)
- * Club domestic league appearances and goals as of 08:13, 26 May 2026 (UTC)

Maksym Rostyslavovych Dyachuk (Ukrainian: Максим Ростиславович Дячук; born 21 July 2003) is a Ukrainian professional footballer who plays as a centre-back for Czech First League club Baník Ostrava, on loan from Dynamo Kyiv.

== Honours ==
Dynamo Kyiv

- Ukrainian Premier League: 2024–25
