= Jordan (footballer, born 1999) =

Brazilian footballer

Personal information
- Full name: Anderson Jordan da Silva Cordeiro
- Date of birth: 22 April 1999 (age 27)
- Place of birth: São Paulo, Brazil
- Height: 1.90 m (6 ft 3 in)
- Position: Centre back

Team information
- Current team: Zorya Luhansk
- Number: 55

Youth career
- Corinthians
- 2014–2017: Ferroviária
- 2018–2019: Cianorte
- 2018–2019: → Corinthians (loan)

Senior career*
Years	Team	Apps	(Gls)
2017–2018	Ferroviária	6	(0)
2018–2022	Cianorte	0	(0)
2018–2019	→ Corinthians (loan)	0	(0)
2020–2021	→ Botafogo-SP (loan)	36	(0)
2021	→ Ceará (loan)	10	(0)
2021	→ Chapecoense (loan)	15	(0)
2022	→ Tombense (loan)	20	(0)
2022	→ Vila Nova (loan)	9	(0)
2023–2024	Vila Nova	12	(0)
2023–2024	→ Zorya Luhansk (loan)	26	(1)
2024–	Zorya Luhansk	58	(6)
- * Club domestic league appearances and goals as of 3 June 2026

Anderson Jordan da Silva Cordeiro (born 22 April 1999), commonly known as Jordan, is a Brazilian footballer who plays as a central defender for Ukrainian club Zorya Luhansk.

== Club career ==
Born in São Paulo, Jordan played for Corinthians and Ferroviária as a youth. He made his senior debut on 2 July 2017, coming on as a late substitute for Danilo Sacramento in a 2–1 Copa Paulista away win against Mirassol.

In 2018, Jordan moved to Cianorte, but was subsequently loaned to Corinthians in June of that year, and featured for their under-20 squad and their under-23 squad in the 2019 Copa Paulista. On 20 December 2019, he moved to Botafogo-SP also in a temporary deal.

Jordan was a regular starter for the Pantera during the campaign, as his club suffered relegation. On 17 February 2021, still owned by Cianorte, he joined Ceará until the end of the year.

Jordan made his Série A debut on 5 June 2021, replacing Gabriel Lacerda late into a 1–3 away loss against Santos.

== Career statistics ==
As of 25 October 2021

Club	Season	League			State League		Cup		Continental		Other		Total	
Club	Season	Division	Apps	Goals	Apps	Goals	Apps	Goals	Apps	Goals	Apps	Goals	Apps	Goals
Ferroviária	2017	Paulista	—		0	0	—		—		5 (Note: Appearance(s) in Copa Paulista)	0	5	0
Cianorte	2018	Série D	0	0	0	0	0	0	—		—		0	0
Corinthians (loan)	2019	Série A	0	0	0	0	0	0	—		8	0	8	0
Botafogo-SP (loan)	2020	Série B	26	0	6	0	—		—		—		32	0
Ceará (loan)	2021	Série A	2	0	3	0	2	0	2 (Note: Appearance(s) in Copa Sudamericana)	0	1 (Note: Appearance(s) in Copa do Nordeste)	0	10	0
Chapecoense (loan)	2021	Série A	12	0	—		—		—		—		12	0
Career total			40	0	9	0	2	0	2	0	14	0	67	0
