= Reshat Ramadani =

Macedonian footballer

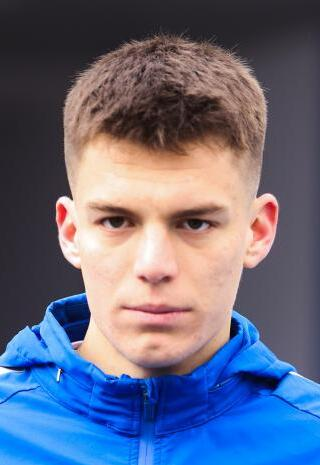
- Ramadani in 2023

Personal information
- Full name: Reshat Ramadani
- Date of birth: 30 June 2003 (age 23)
- Place of birth: Tetovo, Macedonia
- Height: 1.86 m (6 ft 1 in)
- Position: Defensive midfielder

Team information
- Current team: Shkëndija (on loan from Dynamo Kyiv)

Youth career
- Shkëndija

Senior career*
Years	Team	Apps	(Gls)
2021–2023	Shkëndija	23	(1)
2023–	Dynamo Kyiv	3	(0)
2024–	→ Shkëndija (loan)	62	(2)

International career^{‡}
2021	North Macedonia U19	6	(0)
2021–2024	North Macedonia U21	18	(0)
2025–	North Macedonia	2	(0)
- * Club domestic league appearances and goals as of 18 June 2026 ‡ National team caps and goals as of 14:23, 21 November 2025 (UTC)

Reshat Ramadani (Macedonian: Решат Рамадани; born 30 June 2003) is a Macedonian professional footballer who plays as a defensive midfielder for Shkëndija, on loan from Ukrainian Premier League club Dynamo Kyiv and the North Macedonia national team.

== Club career ==
Ramadani is a product of the youth academy of the Macedonian club Shkëndija, and began his senior career with them in 2021 in the Macedonian First Football League. On 1 March 2023 he signed a long-term contract with the Ukrainian Premier League giant Dynamo Kyiv.

== International career ==
Born in North Macedonia, Ramadani is of Albanian descent. He was called up to the senior North Macedonia national team for a set of 2026 FIFA World Cup qualification matches in September 2025.

== Personal life ==
His brother Florent Ramadani is also a professional footballer playing for Shkëndija.
