= 2024–25 FC Dynamo Kyiv season =

FC Dynamo Kyiv
2024–25 season
- President: Ihor Surkis
- Head coach: Oleksandr Shovkovskyi
- Premier League: 1st
- Ukrainian Cup: Runners-up
- UEFA Champions League: Play-off round
- UEFA Europa League: League phase
- Top goalscorer: League: Vladyslav Vanat (17); All: Vladyslav Vanat (21)
Home colours	Away colours	Third colours

The 2024–25 season was the 98th season in the history of FC Dynamo Kyiv, and the club's 34th consecutive season in the Ukrainian Premier League. In addition to the domestic league, the club participated in the Ukrainian Cup, the UEFA Champions League and the UEFA Europa League.

== Season events ==
On 27 June, Dynamo announced the signing of Brayan Ceballos from Fortaleza on a six-month loan deal, with the option to make it permanent. On 13 December, Dynamo announced that Ceballos had left the club after the club had decided not to make the move permanent.

On 23 December, Oleksandr Tymchyk extended his contract with Dynamo until 30 June 2028.

On 31 December, Dynamo announced that Oleksandr Andriyevskyi had left the club after his contract was ended by mutual agreement.

On 3 January, Navin Malysh and Oleksandr Shevchenko joined Vorskla Poltava on loan for the remainder of the season.

On 16 January, Dynamo announced that Volodymyr Shepelyev had left the club after his contract was ended by mutual agreement.

On 29 January, Dynamo announced that Heorhiy Bushchan had left the club to join Saudi Pro League club Al Shabab.

On 7 February, Nazar Voloshyn extended his contract with Dynamo until 30 June 2028, and the following day, 8 February, Vladyslav Dubinchak also extended his contract with Dynamo until 30 June 2028.

On 12 February, Dynamo announced that they had extended their contract with Kostyantyn Vivcharenko until 30 June 2028.

On 6 March, Dynamo announced the signing of Valeriy Luchkevych on a contract until the end of the season.

On 16 April, Dynamo announced that they had signed a new contract with Vitaliy Buyalskyi, until 30 June 2027.

On 6 May, Dynamo announced that they had signed Ángel Torres on a contract until June 2028.

On 20 May, Dynamo announced that they had signed a new contract with Matviy Ponomarenko, until 31 December 2028.

On 21 May, Dynamo announced that they had signed a new one-year contract with Andriy Yarmolenko.

On 28 May, Dynamo announced that they had signed a new one-year contract with Oleksandr Karavayev, with the option of another year.

== Squad ==
As of match played 24 May 2025

Number	Player	Nationality	Position	Date of birth (age)	Signed from	Signed in	Contract ends	Apps.	Goals
Goalkeepers
35	Ruslan Neshcheret	(Ukraine)	GK	22 January 2002 (aged 23)	Academy	2019	2028	49	0
51	Valentyn Morgun	(Ukraine)	GK	10 August 2001 (aged 23)	Academy	2023		3	0
74	Denys Ignatenko	(Ukraine)	GK	11 January 2003 (aged 22)	Academy	2022	2026	0	0
Defenders
2	Kostyantyn Vivcharenko	(Ukraine)	DF	10 June 2002 (aged 22)	Academy	2018	2028	75	4
4	Denys Popov	(Ukraine)	DF	17 February 1999 (aged 26)	Academy	2017		138	12
18	Oleksandr Tymchyk	(Ukraine)	DF	20 January 1997 (aged 28)	Academy	2014	2028	106	4
25	Maksym Dyachuk	(Ukraine)	DF	21 July 2003 (aged 21)	Academy	2020		48	1
32	Taras Mykhavko	(Ukraine)	DF	30 May 2005 (aged 19)	Lviv	2023		47	1
40	Kristian Bilovar	(Ukraine)	DF	5 February 2001 (aged 24)	Academy	2021		36	0
44	Vladyslav Dubinchak	(Ukraine)	DF	1 July 1998 (aged 26)	Academy	2016	2028	86	1
Midfielders
6	Volodymyr Brazhko	(Ukraine)	MF	23 January 2002 (aged 23)	Academy	2019		67	11
9	Nazar Voloshyn	(Ukraine)	MF	17 June 2003 (aged 21)	Academy	2020	2028	84	14
10	Mykola Shaparenko	(Ukraine)	MF	4 October 1998 (aged 26)	Illichivets Mariupol	2017		208	31
15	Valentyn Rubchynskyi	(Ukraine)	MF	15 February 2002 (aged 23)	Dnipro-1	2024	2028	31	3
17	Ángel Torres	(Colombia)	MF	6 April 2000 (aged 25)	Unattached	2025	2028	0	0
20	Oleksandr Karavayev	(Ukraine)	MF	2 June 1992 (aged 32)	Zorya Luhansk	2019	2026 (+1)	174	12
22	Vladyslav Kabayev	(Ukraine)	MF	1 September 1995 (aged 29)	Zorya Luhansk	2022	2026	101	9
27	Valeriy Luchkevych	(Ukraine)	MF	11 January 1996 (aged 29)	Unattached	2025	2025	3	0
29	Vitaliy Buyalskyi	(Ukraine)	MF	6 January 1993 (aged 32)	Academy	2010	2027	360	80
33	Roman Salenko	(Ukraine)	MF	18 May 2005 (aged 20)	Dinaz Vyshhorod	2022		4	0
45	Maksym Braharu	(Ukraine)	MF	21 July 2002 (aged 22)	Unattached	2024	2028	24	1
76	Oleksandr Pikhalyonok	(Ukraine)	MF	7 May 1997 (aged 28)	Dnipro-1	2024	2029	33	6
91	Mykola Mykhaylenko	(Ukraine)	MF	22 May 2001 (aged 24)	Academy	2021		30	2
	Aleksandre Peikrishvili	(Georgia (country))	MF	14 June 2006 (aged 18)	Dinamo Tbilisi	2024	2029	0	0
Forwards
7	Andriy Yarmolenko	(Ukraine)	FW	23 October 1989 (aged 35)	Al Ain	2023	2026	394	155
11	Vladyslav Vanat	(Ukraine)	FW	4 January 2002 (aged 23)	Academy	2021	2027	112	48
39	Eduardo Guerrero	(Panama)	FW	21 February 2000 (aged 25)	Zorya Luhansk	2024	2029	26	1
99	Matviy Ponomarenko	(Ukraine)	FW	11 January 2006 (aged 19)	Academy	2022	2028	13	2
Away on loan
17	Justin Lonwijk	(Suriname)	MF	21 December 1999 (aged 25)	Viborg FF	2022	2027	24	1
21	Vladyslav Supryaha	(Ukraine)	FW	15 February 2000 (aged 25)	Dnipro-1	2018		60	3
23	Navin Malysh	(Ukraine)	DF	27 July 2003 (aged 21)	Academy	2023		6	0
	Oleksandr Syrota	(Ukraine)	DF	11 June 2000 (aged 24)	Academy	2019		85	2
	Vitinho	(Brazil)	MF	1 April 1999 (aged 26)	Athletico Paranaense	2021	2026	13	3
	Reshat Ramadani	(North Macedonia)	MF	30 June 2003 (aged 21)	Shkëndija	2023		4	0
	Samba Diallo	(Senegal)	MF	5 January 2003 (aged 22)	AF Darou Salam	2021		17	1
	Oleksandr Shevchenko	(Ukraine)	MF	25 April 2006 (aged 19)	Vorskla Poltava	2024		0	0
	Anton Tsarenko	(Ukraine)	MF	17 June 2004 (aged 20)	Academy	2022		21	2
	Vikentiy Voloshyn	(Ukraine)	MF	17 April 2001 (aged 24)	Academy	2021		0	0
	Oleksandr Yatsyk	(Ukraine)	MF	3 January 2003 (aged 22)	Academy	2019		3	0
	Eric Ramírez	(Venezuela)	FW	20 November 1998 (aged 26)	DAC 1904	2021		20	4
	Giorgi Tsitaishvili	(Georgia (country))	FW	18 November 2000 (aged 24)	Academy	2018		24	0
	Benito	(Nigeria)	FW	7 September 1998 (aged 26)	Tambov	2020		35	3
	Ihor Horbach	(Ukraine)	FW	27 May 2004 (aged 20)	Academy	2020		0	0
Players who left during the season
1	Heorhiy Bushchan	(Ukraine)	GK	31 May 1994 (aged 30)	Academy	2010		177	0
8	Volodymyr Shepelyev	(Ukraine)	MF	1 June 1997 (aged 27)	Academy	2014	2025	229	7
18	Oleksandr Andriyevskyi	(Ukraine)	MF	25 June 1994 (aged 30)	Metalist Kharkiv	2015		123	5
28	Brayan Ceballos	(Colombia)	DF	24 May 2001 (aged 24)	on loan from Fortaleza	2024	2024	4	1
31	Artem Benedyuk	(Ukraine)	MF	27 February 2004 (aged 21)	Metalist Kharkiv	2020		0	0
	Anton Bol	(Ukraine)	DF	8 January 2003 (aged 22)	Academy	2021	2026	3	0
	Serhiy Buletsa	(Ukraine)	MF	16 February 1999 (aged 26)	Academy	2016		0	0

=== Out on loan ===
Note: Flags indicate national team as defined under FIFA eligibility rules; some limited exceptions apply. Players may hold more than one non-FIFA nationality.

No.	Pos.	Nation	Player
—	DF	UKR	Navin Malysh (at Vorskla Poltava until 30 June 2025)
—	DF	UKR	Oleksandr Syrota (at Maccabi Haifa until 30 June 2025)
—	MF	MKD	Reshat Ramadani (at Shkëndija until 30 June 2025)
—	MF	BRA	Vitinho (at Red Bull Bragantino until 30 June 2025)
—	MF	SEN	Samba Diallo (at Hapoel Jerusalem until 30 June 2025)
—	MF	SUR	Justin Lonwijk (at Viborg FF until 30 June 2025)
—	MF	UKR	Serhiy Buletsa (at Lechia Gdańsk until 30 June 2025)
—	MF	UKR	Oleksandr Shevchenko (at Vorskla Poltava until 30 June 2025)

No.	Pos.	Nation	Player
—	MF	UKR	Anton Tsarenko (at Lechia Gdańsk until 30 June 2025)
—	MF	UKR	Vikentiy Voloshyn (at Zorya Luhansk until 30 June 2025)
—	MF	UKR	Oleksandr Yatsyk (at Zorya Luhansk until 30 June 2025)
—	FW	GEO	Giorgi Tsitaishvili (at Granada until 30 June 2025)
—	FW	NGR	Benito (at Zorya Luhansk until 30 June 2025)
—	FW	UKR	Ihor Horbach (at Zorya Luhansk until 30 June 2025)
—	FW	UKR	Vladyslav Supryaha (at Zorya Luhansk until 30 June 2025)
—	FW	VEN	Eric Ramírez (at Tigre until 30 June 2025)

== Transfers ==
=== In ===
Date	Position	Nationality	Name	From	Fee	Ref.
4 June 2024	MF	(Ukraine)	Maksym Braharu	Unattached	Free	
5 June 2024	MF	(Ukraine)	Oleksandr Pikhalyonok	Dnipro-1	Undisclosed	
3 July 2024	MF	(Ukraine)	Valentyn Rubchynskyi	Dnipro-1	Undisclosed	
16 July 2024	MF	(Georgia (country))	Aleksandre Peikrishvili	Dinamo Tbilisi	Undisclosed	
4 September 2024	FW	(Panama)	Eduardo Guerrero	Zorya Luhansk	Undisclosed	
6 March 2025	MF	(Ukraine)	Valeriy Luchkevych	Unattached	Free	

=== Loans in ===
Date from	Position	Nationality	Name	From	Date to	Ref.
27 June 2024	DF	(Colombia)	Brayan Ceballos	Fortaleza	13 December 2024	

=== Out ===
Date	Position	Nationality	Name	To	Fee	Ref.
24 June 2024	MF	(Jamaica)	Kaheem Parris	Sabah	Undisclosed	
29 January 2025	GK	(Ukraine)	Heorhiy Bushchan	Al Shabab	Undisclosed	
11 March 2025	MF	(Ukraine)	Serhiy Buletsa	Oleksandriya	Undisclosed	

=== Loans out ===
Date from	Position	Nationality	Name	To	Date to	Ref.
11 February 2024	MF	(North Macedonia)	Reshat Ramadani	Shkëndija	30 June 2025	
11 July 2024	DF	(Ukraine)	Oleksandr Syrota	Maccabi Haifa	30 June 2025	
12 July 2024	MF	(Ukraine)	Serhiy Buletsa	Lechia Gdańsk	30 June 2025	
15 July 2024	FW	(Luxembourg)	Gerson Rodrigues	Guangxi Pingguo Haliao	30 June 2025	
24 July 2024	FW	(Venezuela)	Eric Ramírez	Tigre	30 June 2025	
26 July 2024	MF	(Georgia (country))	Giorgi Tsitaishvili	Granada	30 June 2025	
1 August 2024	DF	(Ukraine)	Oleksiy Husyev	Zorya Luhansk	30 June 2025	
1 August 2024	FW	(Nigeria)	Benito	Zorya Luhansk	30 June 2025	
31 August 2024	MF	(Suriname)	Justin Lonwijk	Viborg	30 June 2025	
6 September 2024	FW	(Ukraine)	Vladyslav Supryaha	Zorya Luhansk	30 June 2025	
13 September 2024	MF	(Senegal)	Samba Diallo	Hapoel Jerusalem	30 June 2025	
3 January 2025	DF	(Ukraine)	Navin Malysh	Vorskla Poltava	30 June 2025	
3 January 2025	MF	(Ukraine)	Oleksandr Shevchenko	Vorskla Poltava	30 June 2025	

=== Released ===
Date	Position	Nationality	Name	Joined	Date	Ref.
10 July 2024	DF	(Poland)	Tomasz Kędziora	PAOK		
14 July 2024	MF	(Ukraine)	Mykyta Kravchenko	Oleksandriya	14 July 2024	
31 December 2024	MF	(Ukraine)	Oleksandr Andriyevskyi	Polissya Zhytomyr		
16 January 2025	MF	(Ukraine)	Volodymyr Shepelyev	Oleksandriya	30 January 2025	

=== Trial ===
Date	Position	Nationality	Name	Joined	Date	Ref.
Winter 2025	DF	(South Africa)	Ime Okon	SuperSport United		
Winter 2025	DF	(Ukraine)	Bohdan Slyubyk	Rukh Lviv		

== Friendlies ==
2 July 2024 Friendly	Dynamo Kyiv (Ukraine)	4–0	(Ukraine) Inhulets Petrove
11:00	Braharu 39'; Pashko 48'; Lonwijk 56'; Popov 85'

10 July 2024 Friendly	SC Paderborn (Germany)	0–0	(Ukraine) Dynamo Kyiv	Walchsee, Austria
17:00 UTC+2		Report		Stadium: Ramsbachstadion Walchsee

13 July 2024 Friendly	Schalke 04 (Germany)	2–2	(Ukraine) Dynamo Kyiv	Austria
16:15 UTC+2		Report

14 July 2024 Friendly	Brøndby IF (Denmark)	0–4	(Ukraine) Dynamo Kyiv	Kössen, Austria
14:00			Popov 14'; Tsarenko 71'; Andriyevskyi 75'; Pikhalyonok 81'	Stadium: Kaiserwinkl Arena

17 July 2024 Friendly	Dynamo Kyiv (Ukraine)	1–0	(South Africa) Mamelodi Sundowns	Wörgl, Austria
18:00 UTC+2	Diallo 26'	Report		Stadium: Sportstadion Wörgl

18 July 2024 Friendly	Dynamo Kyiv (Ukraine)	2–3	(Germany) Union Berlin	Kematen
17:00	Vanat 34'; Diallo 83'		Hollerbach 14' (pen.); Bedia 68'; Siebatcheu 90+1'	Stadium: Sportplatz Kematen; Attendance: 648

10 January 2025	Magdeburg	3–1	Dynamo Kyiv	Belek, Turkey
15:00 EET (UTC+2)	Gnaka 2'; Atik 12' (yellow card) 71'; Reimann (yellow card) 71'; Mathisen (yellow card) 71'; Hugonet 83'	Report	Shaparenko (penalty missed) 28'; Buyalskyi (penalty missed) 71' 86'	Stadium: Kaya Palazzo stadium

12 January 2025	Dynamo Kyiv	2–1	FCSB	Belek, Turkey
16:00 EET (UTC+2)	Buyalskyi 21', 27'	Report	Miculescu 73'	Stadium: Gloria Sports Arena

13 January 2025	Widzew Łódź	1–1	Dynamo Kyiv	Antalya, Turkey
14:00 EET (UTC+2)	Sobol 43'; Diliberto (yellow card) 52'; Hanousek (yellow card) 90+4'	Report	Slyubyk (yellow card) 30'; Vanat 88'	Stadium: Miracle Sports Complex

16 January 2025	Maribor	0–2	Dynamo Kyiv	Antalya, Turkey
10:00 EET (UTC+2)	Meško (yellow card) 25'	Report	Dyachuk (yellow card) 19'; Yarmolenko (penalty missed) 25'; Guerrero 31'; Braharu 36'; Pikhalyonok (yellow card) 63'	Stadium: Kaya Palazzo stadium

16 January 2025	CSKA 1948 Sofia	1–4	Dynamo Kyiv	Antalya, Turkey
16:00 EET (UTC+2)	Ilievski 47'; Dudu (yellow card) 74'	Report	Mykhavko (yellow card) 18'; Shaparenko 29'; Vanat 33', 76'; Voloshyn 48'; Mykhaylenko (yellow card) 84'	Stadium: Gloria Sport Arena

23 January 2025	Dynamo Kyiv	2–2	Llapi	Belek, Turkey
15:00 EET (UTC+2)	Pikhalyonok 38' (pen.); Voloshyn 51'	Report	Tahiri 69' (pen.), 89'	Stadium: Kaya Palazzo

6 February 2025	Shkëndija	2–3	Dynamo Kyiv	Belek, Turkey
16:00 EET (UTC+2)	Dyachuk 68' (o.g.); Ramadani 87'	Report	Yarmolenko 38'; Vanat 78', 85'	Stadium: Kaya Palazzo

10 February 2025	Dynamo Kyiv	2–0	Esbjerg	Belek, Turkey
16:00 EET (UTC+2)	Vanat 25'; Dyachuk (yellow card) 57'; Braharu 68'	Report		Stadium: Kaya Palazzo

16 February 2025	Dynamo Kyiv	1–0	RFS	Belek, Turkey
10:30 EET (UTC+2)	Tymchyk 75'	Report		Stadium: Kaya Palazzo stadium

16 February 2025	Dynamo Kyiv	1–0	Petrocub Hîncești	Belek, Turkey
15:00 EET (UTC+2)	Buyalskyi 75'	Report		Stadium: Kaya Palazzo stadium

== Competitions ==
=== Overall record ===
Competition	First match	Last match	Starting round	Final position	Record							
Competition	First match	Last match	Starting round	Final position	Pld	W	D	L	GF	GA	GD	Win %
Premier League	9 August 2024	24 May 2025	Matchday 2	Winners	30	20	10	0	61	18	+43	66.67
Ukrainian Cup	30 October 2024	14 May 2025	Round of 16	Runners up	4	3	1	0	8	3	+5	75.00
UEFA Champions League	23 July 2024	27 August 2024	Second qualifying round	Playoff Round	6	3	2	1	13	6	+7	50.00
UEFA Europa League	25 September 2024	30 January 2025	League phase	34th	8	1	1	6	5	18	−13	12.50
Total					48	27	14	7	87	45	+42	56.25

Last updated: 24 May 2025
Source: Soccerway

=== Premier League ===
==== League table ====
Pos	Team	Pld	W	D	L	GF	GA	GD	Pts	Qualification or relegation
1	Dynamo Kyiv (C)	30	20	10	0	61	19	+42	70	Qualification for the Champions League second qualifying round
2	Oleksandriya	30	20	7	3	46	22	+24	67	Qualification for the Conference League second qualifying round
3	Shakhtar Donetsk	30	18	8	4	69	26	+43	62	Qualification for the Europa League first qualifying round (Note: Shakhtar Donetsk qualified for the Europa League first qualifying round by winning the 2024–25 Ukrainian Cup; the second Conference League spot was passed to the fourth-placed team.)
4	Polissya Zhytomyr	30	12	12	6	38	28	+10	48	Qualification for the Conference League second qualifying round
5	Kryvbas Kryvyi Rih	30	13	8	9	34	26	+8	47	

Source: upl.ua
Rules for classification: 1) Points; 2) Head-to-head points; 3) Head-to-head goal difference; 4) Head-to-head goals scored; 5) Goal difference; 6) Goals scored; 7) Draw or "Golden match" if two teams tied for title (Article 22, paragraph 3).
(C) Champions
Notes:

Teams that placed 13th and 14th in the 2024–25 Ukrainian Premier League played two-leg play-off with the third and fourth teams of the 2024–25 Ukrainian First League. As a result, both the Ukrainian First League teams (Metalist 1925 and Kudrivka) received promotion after beating the Ukrainian Premier League teams (Vorskla and Livyi Bereh), which in turn were relegated. Due to the Russian 2025 summer escalation and the Russian ballistic missile attack warnings, on 1 June 2025, both matches were suspended but later renewed.

Team 1	Agg.	Team 2	1st leg	2nd leg
Kudrivka	2–2 (4–3 p)	Vorskla Poltava	1–2	1–0
Livyi Bereh Kyiv	0–2	Metalist 1925 Kharkiv	0–1	0–1

=== First Semi-final ===
29 May 2025	Kudrivka	1–2	Vorskla Poltava	Kyiv
15:30	Kozak 83'	Report	Ndukve 23'; Pavlyuk 39'	Stadium: Obolon Arena; Attendance: 1,100; Referee: Dmytro Panchyshyn (Kharkiv)

1 June 2025	Vorskla Poltava	0–1 (3–4 p)	Kudrivka	Poltava
13:00		Report	Lytovchenko 9'	Stadium: Vorskla; Attendance: 2,204; Referee: Mykola Balakin (Kyiv oblast)
	Penalties
	Ndukve (penalty scored); Malysh (penalty scored); Iyede (penalty missed); Kane (penalty missed); Salabay (penalty scored); Sklyar (penalty missed)		(penalty scored) Tuzenko; (penalty missed) Storchous; (penalty scored) Shershen; (penalty scored) Potimkov; (penalty missed) Serdyuk; (penalty scored) Liehostayev

2–2 on aggregate; Kudrivka won 4–3 on penalties and promotion to Premier League. While, Vorskla lost 3–4 on penalties and relegation to First League

=== Second Semi-final ===
29 May 2025	Livyi Bereh Kyiv	0–1	Metalist 1925 Kharkiv	Hnidyn, Kyiv Oblast
18:00		Report	Moura 38'	Stadium: Arena Livyi Bereh; Attendance: 1,167; Referee: Viktor Kopiyevskyi (Kropyvnytskyi)

1 June 2025	Metalist 1925 Kharkiv	1–0	Livyi Bereh Kyiv	Hnidyn, Kyiv Oblast
15:30	Kalitvintsev 90'	Report		Stadium: Arena Livyi Bereh; Attendance: 1,800; Referee: Vitaliy Romanov (Dnipro)

Metalist 1925 Kharkiv won 2–0 on aggregate and promotion to Premier League. While, Livyi Bereh Kyiv lost 0–2 on aggregate and relegation to First League.

==== Results summary ====
Overall								Home						Away					
Pld	W	D	L	GF	GA	GD	Pts	W	D	L	GF	GA	GD	W	D	L	GF	GA	GD
30	20	10	0	61	18	+43	70	11	4	0	31	10	+21	9	6	0	30	8	+22

Last updated: 24 May 2025.

==== Matches ====
The match schedule was released on 28 June 2024.

9 August 2024 2	Veres Rivne	1–2	Dynamo Kyiv	Rivne
18:00 EEST (UTC+3)	Protasevych (yellow card) 30'; Mrvaljević (yellow card) 32'; Stepanyuk (yellow card) 59'; Vovchenko (yellow card) 61'; Sharay 63'; Honcharenko (yellow card) 74'	Report	Kabayev (yellow card) 10'; Shaparenko 16'; Popov (yellow card) 34'; Buyalskyi 44'; Braharu (yellow card) 86'	Stadium: Avanhard Stadium; Attendance: 4,509; Referee: Oleksandr Omelchenko

17 August 2024 3	Karpaty Lviv	1–3	Dynamo Kyiv	Lviv
18:00 EEST (UTC+3)	Ocheretko 1' (yellow card) 79'	Report	Pikhalyonok 23'; Vanat 58'; Yarmolenko 90+2' (pen.)	Stadium: Ukraina Stadium; Attendance: 3,600; Referee: Viktor Kopievskii

1 September 2024 5	Dynamo Kyiv	1–0	LNZ Cherkasy	Kyiv
15:30 EEST (UTC+3)	Yarmolenko 22' (pen.); Rubchynskyi (yellow card) 58'; Bushchan (yellow card) 86'	Report	Pasich (yellow card) 5'; Salihu (yellow card) 22'; Bessala (yellow card) 50'; Topalov (yellow card) 67'; Boyko (yellow card) 88'	Stadium: Valeriy Lobanovskyi Dynamo Stadium; Attendance: 1,789; Referee: Oleksandr Shandor

14 September 2024 6	Zorya Luhansk	0–2	Dynamo Kyiv	Kyiv
15:30 EEST (UTC+3)	Mićin (yellow card) 86'	Report	Vivcharenko (yellow card) 39'; Buyalskyi 67'; Braharu 78'	Stadium: Valeriy Lobanovskyi Dynamo Stadium; Attendance: 1,788; Referee: Roman Blavatskyi

18 September 2024 4	Dynamo Kyiv	3–1	Vorskla Poltava	Kyiv
18:00 EEST (UTC+3)	Ceballos 33' (yellow card) 66'; Karavayev 35'; Brazhko (yellow card) 57'; Pikhalyonok 90+1'	Report	Iyede 81'	Stadium: Valeriy Lobanovskyi Dynamo Stadium; Attendance: 2,076; Referee: Volodymyr Novohatnii

21 September 2024 7	Dynamo Kyiv	0–0	Rukh Lviv	Kyiv
18:00 EEST (UTC+3)		Report	Kholod (yellow card) 45'	Stadium: Valeriy Lobanovskyi Dynamo Stadium; Attendance: 1,789; Referee: Vitalii Romanov

29 September 2024 8	Livyi Bereh Kyiv	0–3	Dynamo Kyiv	Hnidyn
18:00 EEST (UTC+3)	Samar (yellow card) 23' (yellow-red card) 80'; Yakymiv (yellow card) 80'	Report	Mykhavko 8'; Popov (yellow card) 44'; Brazhko 62'; Bilovar (yellow card) 74'; Rubchynskyi 90+1'	Stadium: Arena Livyi Bereh; Attendance: 1,179; Referee: Andrii Kovalenko

6 October 2024 9	Dynamo Kyiv	2–1	Kryvbas Kryvyi Rih	Kyiv
18:00 EEST (UTC+3)	Rubchynskyi 5'; Buyalskyi 25' (pen.); Yarmolenko (yellow card) 53'; Andriyevskyi (yellow card) 85'	Report	Mykhavko 45+3' (o.g.); Poé (yellow card) 47'; Bizimana (yellow card) 64'; Ilić (yellow card) 90+4'; Amoroso (yellow card) 90+4'	Stadium: Valeriy Lobanovskyi Dynamo Stadium; Attendance: 1,794; Referee: Mykola Balakin

19 October 2024 10	Obolon Kyiv	1–5	Dynamo Kyiv	Kyiv
15:30 EEST (UTC+3)	Taranukha (yellow card) 8'; Dubko (yellow card) 20'; Mykhavko 52' (o.g.); Chernenko (yellow card) 58'; Kurko (yellow card) 88'	Report	Shaparenko 11'; Vanat 21' (pen.), 29'; Karavayev 49'; Brazhko 73'	Stadium: Obolon Arena; Attendance: 2,400; Referee: Viktor Kopievskii

27 October 2024 11	Dynamo Kyiv	1–1	Shakhtar Donetsk	Kyiv
18:00 EET (UTC+2)	Andriyevskyi (yellow card) 62'; Karavayev 87'	Report	Zubkov (yellow card) 40'; Bondarenko 48'; Pedro Henrique (yellow card) 58'; Kryskiv (red card) 61'	Stadium: Valeriy Lobanovskyi Dynamo Stadium; Attendance: 3,500; Referee: Mykola Balakin

3 November 2024 12	Dynamo Kyiv	5–2	Inhulets Petrove	Kyiv
18:00 EET (UTC+2)	Vanat 4', 44'; Kabayev 25'; Shaparenko 39', 73'	Report	Kyslenko 34'; Pushkaryov (yellow card) 35'; Mykhavko 57' (o.g.); Mysyk (yellow card) 63'	Stadium: Valeriy Lobanovskyi Dynamo Stadium; Attendance: 1,741; Referee: Oleksii Derevinskyi

10 November 2024 13	Dynamo Kyiv	2–1	Polissya Zhytomyr	Kyiv
18:00 EET (UTC+2)	Vanat 22'; Yarmolenko 27' (pen.); Popov (yellow card) 66'	Report	Mykhaylichenko (yellow card) 39' (yellow-red card) 45'; Smolyakov (yellow card) 45'; Taylor (yellow card) 82'; Hutsulyak 87'; Babenko (yellow card) 90'; Talles (yellow card) 90+3'	Stadium: Valeriy Lobanovskyi Dynamo Stadium; Attendance: 3,443; Referee: Vitalii Romanov

23 November 2024 14	Dynamo Kyiv	3–1	Chornomorets Odesa	Kyiv
15:30 EET (UTC+2)	Vanat 16'; Buyalskyi 69'; Rubchynskyi 88'; Vivcharenko (yellow card) 90+1'	Report	Jarju (yellow card) 70'; Skyba 90+3'	Stadium: Valeriy Lobanovskyi Dynamo Stadium; Attendance: 1,492; Referee: Maksym Kozyriatskyi

1 December 2024 15	Kolos Kovalivka	1–1	Dynamo Kyiv	Kovalivka
15:30 EET (UTC+2)	Alefirenko 33' (yellow card) 56'; Bolívar (yellow card) 52'; Kozik (yellow card) 65'; Denysenko (yellow card) 80'; Demchenko (yellow card) 82'	Report	Brazhko 5'	Stadium: Kolos Stadium; Attendance: 726; Referee: Roman Blavatskyi

4 December 2024 1	Oleksandriya	0–0	Dynamo Kyiv	Oleksandriia
15:30 EET (UTC+2)	Kravchenko (yellow card) 57'	Report	Brazhko (yellow card) 90+3'	Stadium: CSC Nika Stadium; Attendance: 1,180; Referee: Vitalii Romanov
Note: The match, originally scheduled for August 2, was postponed due to Dynamo Kyiv's participation in the Champions League.

8 December 2024 16	Dynamo Kyiv	3–0	Oleksandriya	Kyiv
18:00 EET (UTC+2)	Popov 36'; Vanat 42', 55'	Report	Campos (yellow card) 54'	Stadium: Valeriy Lobanovskyi Dynamo Stadium; Attendance: 1,733; Referee: Oleksandr Afanasiev

16 December 2024 17	Dynamo Kyiv	1–0	Veres Rivne	Kyiv
13:00 EET (UTC+2)	Vanat 23'	Report	Honcharenko (yellow card) 61'	Stadium: Valeriy Lobanovskyi Dynamo Stadium; Attendance: 480; Referee: Oleksandr Shandor

23 February 2025 18	Dynamo Kyiv	2–0	Karpaty Lviv	Kyiv
18:00 EET (UTC+2)	Mykhaylenko 54'; Vanat 75'; Popov (yellow card) 90'	Report	Baboglo (yellow card) 29'; Miroshnichenko (yellow card) 32'	Stadium: Valeriy Lobanovskyi Dynamo Stadium; Attendance: 1,461; Referee: Mykola Balakin

28 February 2025 19	Vorskla Poltava	1–1	Dynamo Kyiv	Kyiv
15:30 EET (UTC+2)	Avdyli (yellow card) 28'; Chelyadin (yellow card) 38'; Sklyar (yellow card) 52' (goal) 64'; Ostrovskyi (yellow card) 87' (yellow-red card) 90'; Salabay (yellow card) 87'	Report	Buyalskyi 16'; Vivcharenko (yellow card) 18'; Dyachuk (yellow card) 85'	Stadium: Valeriy Lobanovskyi Dynamo Stadium; Attendance: 526; Referee: Oleksii Derevinskyi

6 March 2025 20	LNZ Cherkasy	1–2	Dynamo Kyiv	Cherkasy
15:30 EET (UTC+2)	Jashari 49'	Report	Vivcharenko 11'; Kabayev (yellow card) 82'; Putrya 89' (o.g.); Brazhko (yellow card) 89'	Stadium: Cherkasy Arena; Attendance: 2,165; Referee: Oleksandr Afanasiev

11 March 2025 21	Dynamo Kyiv	2–2	Zorya Luhansk	Kyiv
15:30 EET (UTC+2)	Vanat 5'; Braharu (yellow card) 26'; Shaparenko (yellow card) 30'; Yarmolenko (yellow card) 32'; Ponomarenko (yellow card) 59' (goal) 72'; Dubinchak (yellow card) 76'; Popov (yellow card) 85'	Report	Budkivskyi 2'; Jordan 9' (yellow card) 32'; Bašić (yellow card) 22'; Juninho (yellow card) 76'	Stadium: Valeriy Lobanovskyi Dynamo Stadium; Attendance: 1,503; Referee: Viktor Kopievskii

29 March 2025 22	Rukh Lviv	0–2	Dynamo Kyiv	Lviv
18:00 EET (UTC+2)	Pidhurskyi (yellow card) 53'	Report	Vanat 11'; Buyalskyi 30'; Kabayev (yellow card) 45'; Pikhalyonok (yellow card) 90+1'	Stadium: Arena Lviv; Attendance: 3,950; Referee: Maksym Kozyriatskyi

6 April 2025 23	Dynamo Kyiv	2–0	Livyi Bereh Kyiv	Kyiv
15:30 EET (UTC+2)	Yarmolenko 44'; Shaparenko 47'	Report	Semenov (yellow card) 55'; Prykhodko (yellow card) 59'; Riznyk (yellow card) 64'	Stadium: Valeriy Lobanovskyi Dynamo Stadium; Attendance: 1,750; Referee: Roman Blavatskyi

12 April 2025 24	Kryvbas Kryvyi Rih	0–2	Dynamo Kyiv	Kryvyi Rih
13:00 EET (UTC+2)	Zaderaka (yellow card) 29'; Konaté (yellow card) 33'	Report	Yarmolenko 35' (yellow card) 38'; Popov (red card) 67'; Shaparenko (yellow card) 72'; Vanat 74'; Brazhko (yellow card) 79'; Mykhavko (yellow card) 85'	Stadium: Hirnyk Stadium; Attendance: 1,398; Referee: Mykola Balakin

18 April 2025 25	Dynamo Kyiv	3–0	Obolon Kyiv	Kyiv
18:00 EET (UTC+2)	Dubinchak (yellow card) 15'; Yarmolenko 39'; Vanat 55' (pen.) (yellow card) 57'; Buyalskyi 67'; Rubchynskyi (yellow card) 90+2'	Report	Ilyin (yellow card) 30'	Stadium: Valeriy Lobanovskyi Dynamo Stadium; Attendance: 1,793; Referee: Oleksandr Shandor

27 April 2025 26	Shakhtar Donetsk	2–2	Dynamo Kyiv	Lviv
18:00 EET (UTC+2)	Kevin 6' (pen.); Eguinaldo 20'; Alisson (yellow card) 78'	Report	Vanat 56'; Dubinchak (yellow card) 79'; Kabayev 90+3'	Stadium: Arena Lviv; Attendance: 4,850; Referee: Vitaliy Romanov

3 May 2025 27	Inhulets Petrove	0–4	Dynamo Kyiv	Oleksandriia
15:30 EET (UTC+2)	Zhovtenko (yellow card) 37'	Report	Dykhtyaruk 38' (o.g.); Shaparenko 40'; Mykhaylenko 55'; Vanat 57'	Stadium: CSC Nika Stadium; Attendance: 619; Referee: Dmytro Panchyshyn

9 May 2025 28	Polissya Zhytomyr	0–0	Dynamo Kyiv	Zhytomyr
18:00 EET (UTC+2)	Hadroj (yellow card) 79'	Report	Vanat (yellow card) 68'; Popov (yellow card) 69'; Dubinchak (yellow card) 90+1'	Stadium: Tsentralnyi Stadion; Attendance: 4,800; Referee: Vitaly Romanov

18 May 2025 29	Chornomorets Odesa	1–1	Dynamo Kyiv	Odesa
15:30 EET (UTC+2)	Khoblenko (yellow card) 45' (goal) 68'	Report	Mykhaylenko (yellow card) 31'; Yarmolenko 54' (pen.); Shaparenko (yellow card) 56'	Stadium: Chornomorets Stadium; Attendance: 2,100; Referee: Igor Paschal

24 May 2025 30	Dynamo Kyiv	1–1	Kolos Kovalivka	Kyiv
18:00 EET (UTC+2)	Pikhalyonok 31' (yellow card) 45'; Vanat (yellow card) 90+2'	Report	Sydorov 47'; Orikhovskyi (yellow card) 90'	Stadium: Valeriy Lobanovskyi Dynamo Stadium; Attendance: 3,650; Referee: Roman Blavatsky

=== Ukrainian Cup ===
30 October 2024 Round of 16	Vorskla Poltava	1–2 (a.e.t.)	Dynamo Kyiv	Poltava
15:30 EET (UTC+2)	Iyede 26'; Perduta (yellow card) 90'	Report	Guerrero 31' (pen.); Dyachuk (yellow card) 75'; Vanat 100'; Dubinchak (yellow card) 108'	Stadium: Vorskla Stadium; Attendance: 2,358; Referee: Oleksandr Afanasyev

2 April 2025 Quarter-final	Rukh Lviv	0–1	Dynamo Kyiv	Lviv
18:00 EEST (UTC+3)	Slyusar (yellow card) 45'	Report	Pikhalyonok 43'; Rubchynskyi (yellow card) 84'	Stadium: Arena Lviv; Attendance: 1,350; Referee: Vitalii Romanov

23 April 2025 Semi-final	Bukovyna Chernivtsi	1–4	Dynamo Kyiv	Lviv
16:00 EEST (UTC+3)	Boychuk 23'; Kanevtsev (yellow card) 70'; Prokopchuk (yellow card) 87'	Report	Voloshyn 56', 63'; Brazhko 72' (pen.); Shaparenko 76' (yellow card) 88'	Stadium: Ukraina Stadium; Attendance: 3,200; Referee: Maksym Kozyriatskyi

14 May 2025 Final	Shakhtar Donetsk	1–1 (a.e.t.) (6–5 p)	Dynamo Kyiv	Zhytomyr
18:30 EEST (UTC+3)	Eguinaldo (yellow card) 34'; Marlon (yellow card) 53'; Kauã 64'	Report	Yarmolenko 43'; Vanat (yellow card) 53'; Yarmolenko (yellow card) 61'; Dubinchak (yellow card) 97'	Stadium: Tsentralnyi Stadion; Attendance: 4,740; Referee: Mykola Balakin
	Penalties
	Nazaryna (penalty scored); Alisson (penalty scored); Kevin (penalty scored); Kauã (penalty scored); Ghram (penalty scored); Kryskiv (penalty scored)		(penalty scored) Vanat; (penalty scored) Brazhko; (penalty scored) Vivcharenko; (penalty scored) Mykhailenko; (penalty scored) Pikhalyonok; (penalty missed) Karavayev

=== UEFA Champions League ===
==== Qualifying rounds ====
23 July 2024 Second qualifying round 1st leg	Dynamo Kyiv (Ukraine)	6–2	(Serbia) Partizan	Lublin, Poland
21:00 EEST (UTC+3)	Shaparenko 40'; Brazhko 43', (yellow card) 47'; Karavayev 45+1'; Kabayev 55'; Popov 83'; Pikhalyonok 90+2'	Report	Saldanha (yellow card) 1', (goal) 22' (pen.), 66'; De Medina (yellow card) 11'; Arriaga (yellow card) 81'	Stadium: Arena Lublin; Attendance: 4,712; Referee: Christian Dingert (Germany)
Note: Due to the Russian invasion of Ukraine, Ukrainian teams were required to play their home matches at neutral venues until further notice.

31 July 2024 Second qualifying round 2nd leg	Partizan (Serbia)	0–3 (2–9 agg.)	(Ukraine) Dynamo Kyiv	Belgrade, Serbia
21:00 EEST (UTC+3)	Filipović (yellow card) 58'; Marković (yellow card) 90'	Report	Yarmolenko 16'; Vanat 69' (pen.); Karavayev 90+3'	Stadium: Partizan Stadium; Attendance: 10; Referee: Marian Barbu (Romania)
Note: The Partizan v Dynamo Kyiv match was played behind closed doors due to a punishment by UEFA to Partizan for discriminatory and racist behaviour of their fans during the match against Nordsjælland in the 2023–24 UEFA Europa Conference League qualifying phase.

6 August 2024 Third qualifying round 1st leg	Dynamo Kyiv (Ukraine)	1–1	(Scotland) Rangers	Lublin, Poland
21:00 EEST (UTC+3)	Yarmolenko 38'	Report	Tavernier (yellow card) 78'; Souttar (yellow card) 84'; Dessers (yellow card) 90', (goal) 90+4'	Stadium: Arena Lublin; Attendance: 8,315; Referee: Donatas Rumšas (Lithuania)
Note: Due to the Russian invasion of Ukraine, Ukrainian teams were required to play their home matches at neutral venues until further notice.

13 August 2024 Third qualifying round 2nd leg	Rangers (Scotland)	0–2 (1–3 agg.)	(Ukraine) Dynamo Kyiv	Glasgow, Scotland
21:45 EEST (UTC+3)	Jefté (yellow card) 31' (yellow-red card) 50'; Diomande (yellow card) 45'	Report	Pikhalyonok 82'; Voloshyn 84'	Stadium: Hampden Park; Attendance: 39,180; Referee: Marco Guida (Italy)
Note: Rangers played their home match at Hampden Park, instead of their regular stadium, Ibrox Stadium, due to renovation works.

21 August 2024 Playoff round 1st leg	Dynamo Kyiv (Ukraine)	0–2	(Austria) Red Bull Salzburg	Lublin, Poland
22:00 EEST (UTC+3)	Shaparenko (yellow card) 45+3'; Dubinchak (yellow card) 81'	Report	Nene 29'; Dedić (yellow card) 45+3'; Kjærgaard 50' (pen.); Van Der Brempt (yellow card) 77'	Stadium: Arena Lublin; Attendance: 7,126; Referee: Sandro Schärer (Switzerland)
Note: Due to the Russian invasion of Ukraine, Ukrainian teams were required to play their home matches at neutral venues until further notice.

27 August 2024 Playoff round 2nd leg	Red Bull Salzburg (Austria)	1–1 (3–1 agg.)	(Ukraine) Dynamo Kyiv	Salzburg, Austria
22:00 EEST (UTC+3)	Daghim 12'; Diambou (yellow card) 70'; Gourna-Douath (yellow card) 77'	Report	Vanat 29', (yellow card) 65'; Popov (yellow card) 31'; Mykhavko (yellow card) 32'; Dubinchak (yellow card) 78'; Bilovar (yellow card) 90+2'	Stadium: Red Bull Arena; Attendance: 23,289; Referee: Halil Umut Meler (Turkey)

=== UEFA Europa League ===
==== League phase ====
Pos	Team	Pld	W	D	L	GF	GA	GD	Pts
32	(Latvian Football Federation) RFS	8	1	2	5	6	13	−7	5
33	(Bulgarian Football Union) Ludogorets Razgrad	8	0	4	4	4	11	−7	4
34	(Ukrainian Association of Football) Dynamo Kyiv	8	1	1	6	5	18	−13	4
35	(French Football Federation) Nice	8	0	3	5	7	16	−9	3
36	(Association of Football Federations of Azerbaijan) Qarabağ	8	1	0	7	6	20	−14	3

Source: UEFA
Rules for classification: League phase tiebreakers

Round	1	2	3	4	5	6	7	8
Ground	H	A	A	H	H	A	A	H
Result	L	L	L	L	L	L	D	W
Position	34	35	35	36	36	36	36	34

Updated to match(es) played on 30 January 2025. Source: Results
A = Away; H = Home; W = Win; D = Draw; L = Loss

25 September 2024 1	Dynamo Kyiv (Ukraine)	0–3	(Italy) Lazio	Hamburg, Germany
22:00 EEST (UTC+3)	Dubinchak (yellow card) 63'; Braharu (red card) 73'; Mykhavko (yellow card) 90+3'	Report	Dia 5', 35'; Dele-Bashiru 34'; Noslin (red card) 82'; Romagnoli (yellow card) 88'	Stadium: Volksparkstadion; Attendance: 7,751; Referee: Anastasios Sidiropoulos (Greece)
Note: Due to the Russian invasion of Ukraine, Ukrainian teams are required to play their home matches at neutral venues until further notice. Therefore, Dynamo Kyiv will play their home matches at Volksparkstadion, Hamburg, Germany, instead of their regular stadium, Olympic Stadium, Kyiv.

3 October 2024 2	TSG Hoffenheim (Germany)	2–0	(Ukraine) Dynamo Kyiv	Sinsheim, Germany
19:45 EEST (UTC+3)	Hložek 22', 60'; Grillitsch (yellow card) 40'	Report		Stadium: Rhein-Neckar-Arena; Attendance: 20,351; Referee: Aleksandar Stavrev (North Macedonia)

24 October 2024 3	Roma (Italy)	1–0	(Ukraine) Dynamo Kyiv	Rome, Italy
19:45 EEST (UTC+3)	Dovbyk 23' (pen.); Angeliño (yellow card) 44'	Report	Mykhavko (yellow card) 22'; Rubchynskyi (yellow card) 36'; Kabayev (yellow card) 84'; Shaparenko (yellow card) 90+4'	Stadium: Stadio Olimpico; Attendance: 61,624; Referee: Serdar Gözübüyük (Netherlands)

7 November 2024 4	Dynamo Kyiv (Ukraine)	0–4	(Hungary) Ferencváros	Hamburg, Germany
22:00 EET (UTC+2)	Dubinchak (red card) 17'; Shaparenko (yellow card) 58'; Brazhko (yellow card) 79'	Report	Zachariassen (yellow card) 22' (goal) 56'; Makreckis (yellow card) 41'; Varga 54', 67'; Rommens (yellow card) 58'; Saldanha 76'	Stadium: Volksparkstadion; Attendance: 5,338; Referee: Mohammed Al-Hakim (Sweden)
Note: Due to the Russian invasion of Ukraine, Ukrainian teams are required to play their home matches at neutral venues until further notice. Therefore, Dynamo Kyiv will play their home matches at Volksparkstadion, Hamburg, Germany, instead of their regular stadium, Olympic Stadium, Kyiv.

28 November 2024 5	Dynamo Kyiv (Ukraine)	1–2	(Czech Republic) Viktoria Plzeň	Hamburg, Germany
19:45 EET (UTC+2)	Brazhko (yellow card) 68'; Kabayev 90+5'	Report	Marković (yellow card) 45'; Vydra 55'; Havel (yellow card) 80'; Šulc 90'	Stadium: Volksparkstadion; Attendance: 4,456; Referee: Luis Godinho (Portugal)
Note: Due to the Russian invasion of Ukraine, Ukrainian teams are required to play their home matches at neutral venues until further notice. Therefore, Dynamo Kyiv will play their home matches at Volksparkstadion, Hamburg, Germany, instead of their regular stadium, Olympic Stadium, Kyiv.

12 December 2024 6	Real Sociedad (Spain)	3–0	(Ukraine) Dynamo Kyiv	San Sebastián, Spain
22:00 EET (UTC+2)	Oyarzabal (penalty missed) 19' 19', 33'; Becker 24'; Odriozola (yellow card) 75'; Magunazelaia (yellow card) 83'	Report	Dubinchak (yellow card) 30'; Braharu (yellow card) 89'	Stadium: Anoeta; Attendance: 26,457; Referee: Harm Osmers (Germany)

21 January 2025 7	Galatasaray (Turkey)	3–3	(Ukraine) Dynamo Kyiv	Istanbul, Turkey
17:30 EET (UTC+2)	Sánchez 6' (yellow card) 80'; Bardakcı 21'; Yılmaz (yellow card) 33'; Jakobs (yellow card) 40'; Osimhen 53' (pen.) (yellow card) 84'	Report	Shaparenko (yellow card) 40'; Vanat 44'; Tymchyk (yellow card) 52'; Yarmolenko 68', 81'; Pikhalyonok (yellow card) 72'; Mykhaylenko (yellow card) 74'; Vivcharenko (yellow card) 84'	Stadium: Rams Park; Attendance: 45,273; Referee: Kristo Tohver (Estonia)

30 January 2025 8	Dynamo Kyiv (Ukraine)	1–0	(Latvia) RFS	Hamburg, Germany
22:00 EET (UTC+2)	Bilovar (yellow card) 20'; Pikhalonok 76'; Ponomarenko (yellow card) 90+1'	Report	Panić (yellow card) 39'; Prenga (yellow card) 90+1'	Stadium: Volksparkstadion; Attendance: 3,698; Referee: Orel Grinfeld (Israel)
Note: Due to the Russian invasion of Ukraine, Ukrainian teams are required to play their home matches at neutral venues until further notice. Therefore, Dynamo Kyiv will play their home matches at Volksparkstadion, Hamburg, Germany, instead of their regular stadium, Olympic Stadium, Kyiv.

== Squad statistics ==
As of match played 24 May 2025

=== Appearances and goals ===
No.	Pos	Nat	Player	Total		Premier League		Ukrainian Cup		UEFA Champions League		UEFA Europa League	
No.	Pos	Nat	Player	Apps	Goals	Apps	Goals	Apps	Goals	Apps	Goals	Apps	Goals
2	DF	(Ukraine) UKR	Kostyantyn Vivcharenko	28	1	15+2	1	3+1	0	2	0	4+1	0
4	DF	(Ukraine) UKR	Denys Popov	35	3	20+1	1	2+1	1	6	1	4+1	0
6	MF	(Ukraine) UKR	Volodymyr Brazhko	37	5	15+7	3	2+2	1	5	1	5+1	0
7	FW	(Ukraine) UKR	Andriy Yarmolenko	33	12	17+4	7	2+1	1	6	2	2+1	2
9	MF	(Ukraine) UKR	Nazar Voloshyn	40	2	8+16	0	3+1	1	1+5	1	5+1	0
10	MF	(Ukraine) UKR	Mykola Shaparenko	38	8	17+6	6	1+2	1	6	1	5+1	0
11	FW	(Ukraine) UKR	Vladyslav Vanat	45	21	25+3	17	1+2	1	6	2	6+2	1
15	MF	(Ukraine) UKR	Valentyn Rubchynskyi	31	3	6+15	3	3	0	0	0	4+3	0
18	DF	(Ukraine) UKR	Oleksandr Tymchyk	29	0	20	0	1+1	0	1+1	0	4+1	0
20	MF	(Ukraine) UKR	Oleksandr Karavayev	29	5	12+5	3	2+1	0	5	2	4	0
22	MF	(Ukraine) UKR	Vladyslav Kabayev	47	4	24+5	2	1+3	0	5+1	1	5+3	1
25	DF	(Ukraine) UKR	Maksym Dyachuk	15	0	6+3	0	3	0	2	0	1	0
27	MF	(Ukraine) UKR	Valeriy Luchkevych	3	0	0+2	0	1	0	0	0	0	0
29	MF	(Ukraine) UKR	Vitaliy Buyalskyi	40	7	26+3	7	1+2	0	3+1	0	3+1	0
32	DF	(Ukraine) UKR	Taras Mykhavko	38	1	23+3	1	1	0	4	0	7	0
33	MF	(Ukraine) UKR	Roman Salenko	4	0	0+2	0	0	0	0	0	0+2	0
35	GK	(Ukraine) UKR	Ruslan Neshcheret	18	0	13	0	2	0	0	0	3	0
39	FW	(Panama) PAN	Eduardo Guerrero	26	1	4+12	0	3	1	0	0	2+5	0
40	DF	(Ukraine) UKR	Kristian Bilovar	29	0	10+7	0	1+1	0	0+3	0	6+1	0
44	DF	(Ukraine) UKR	Vladyslav Dubinchak	31	0	15+6	0	1+1	0	4	0	4	0
45	MF	(Ukraine) UKR	Maksym Braharu	24	1	7+8	1	2	0	0+4	0	0+3	0
51	GK	(Ukraine) UKR	Valentyn Morhun	3	0	1	0	2	0	0	0	0	0
76	MF	(Ukraine) UKR	Oleksandr Pikhalyonok	33	7	7+12	3	2+1	1	4+2	2	2+3	1
91	MF	(Ukraine) UKR	Mykola Mykhaylenko	30	2	16+5	2	2	0	0+2	0	5	0
99	FW	(Ukraine) UKR	Matviy Ponomarenko	5	1	0+2	1	0+1	0	0	0	0+2	0
Players away on loan:
17	MF	(Suriname) SUR	Justin Lonwijk	6	0	1+1	0	0	0	0+4	0	0	0
21	FW	(Ukraine) UKR	Vladyslav Supryaha	5	0	1+1	0	0	0	0+3	0	0	0
23	DF	(Ukraine) UKR	Navin Malysh	3	0	0+1	0	1	0	0+1	0	0	0
Players who left Dynamo Kyiv during the season:
1	GK	(Ukraine) UKR	Heorhiy Bushchan	27	0	16	0	0	0	6	0	5	0
8	MF	(Ukraine) UKR	Volodymyr Shepelyev	1	0	0	0	0	0	0	0	0+1	0
18	MF	(Ukraine) UKR	Oleksandr Andriyevskyi	13	0	3+4	0	1	0	0+2	0	1+2	0
28	DF	(Colombia) COL	Brayan Ceballos	4	1	2+1	1	0	0	0	0	1	0

=== Goalscorers ===
Place	Position	Nation	Number	Name	Premier League	Ukrainian Cup	Champions League	Europa League	Total
1	FW	(Ukraine)	11	Vladyslav Vanat	17	2	2	1	21
2	FW	(Ukraine)	7	Andriy Yarmolenko	7	1	2	2	12
3	MF	(Ukraine)	10	Mykola Shaparenko	6	1	1	0	8
4	MF	(Ukraine)	29	Vitaliy Buyalskyi	7	0	0	0	7
4	MF	(Ukraine)	76	Oleksandr Pikhalyonok	3	1	2	1	7
6	MF	(Ukraine)	6	Volodymyr Brazhko	3	1	1	0	5
6	DF	(Ukraine)	20	Oleksandr Karavayev	3	0	2	0	5
8	MF	(Ukraine)	22	Vladyslav Kabayev	2	0	1	1	3
9	MF	(Ukraine)	15	Valentyn Rubchynskyi	3	0	0	0	3
9	DF	(Ukraine)	4	Denys Popov	1	1	1	0	3
11	MF	(Ukraine)	91	Mykola Mykhaylenko	2	0	0	0	2
11	MF	(Ukraine)	9	Nazar Voloshyn	0	1	1	0	2
11				Own goal	2	0	0	0	2
14	MF	(Ukraine)	45	Maksym Braharu	1	0	0	0	1
14	DF	(Colombia)	28	Brayan Ceballos	1	0	0	0	1
14	DF	(Ukraine)	32	Taras Mykhavko	1	0	0	0	1
14	DF	(Ukraine)	2	Kostyantyn Vivcharenko	1	0	0	0	1
14	FW	(Ukraine)	99	Matviy Ponomarenko	1	0	0	0	1
14	FW	(Panama)	39	Eduardo Guerrero	0	1	0	0	1
TOTALS					61	8	13	5	87

=== Clean sheets ===
Place	Position	Nation	Number	Name	Premier League	Ukrainian Cup	Champions League	Europa League	Total
1	GK	(Ukraine)	1	Heorhiy Bushchan	7	0	2	0	9
2	GK	(Ukraine)	35	Ruslan Neshcheret	7	0	0	1	8
3	GK	(Ukraine)	51	Valentyn Morhun	0	1	0	0	1
TOTALS					14	1	2	1	18

=== Disciplinary record ===
Number	Nation	Position	Name	Premier League		Ukrainian Cup		Champions League		Europa League		Total	
Number	Nation	Position	Name	Yellow card	Red card	Yellow card	Red card	Yellow card	Red card	Yellow card	Red card	Yellow card	Red card
2	(Ukraine)	DF	Kostyantyn Vivcharenko	3	0	0	0	0	0	1	0	4	0
4	(Ukraine)	DF	Denys Popov	6	1	0	0	1	0	0	0	7	1
6	(Ukraine)	MF	Volodymyr Brazhko	4	0	0	0	1	0	2	0	7	0
7	(Ukraine)	FW	Andriy Yarmolenko	3	0	1	0	0	0	0	0	4	0
10	(Ukraine)	MF	Mykola Shaparenko	3	0	1	0	1	0	3	0	8	0
11	(Ukraine)	FW	Vladyslav Vanat	3	0	1	0	1	0	0	0	5	0
15	(Ukraine)	MF	Valentyn Rubchynskyi	2	0	1	0	0	0	1	0	4	0
22	(Ukraine)	MF	Vladyslav Kabayev	3	0	0	0	0	0	1	0	4	0
24	(Ukraine)	DF	Oleksandr Tymchyk	0	0	0	0	0	0	1	0	1	0
25	(Ukraine)	DF	Maksym Dyachuk	1	0	1	0	0	0	0	0	2	0
32	(Ukraine)	DF	Taras Mykhavko	01	0	0	0	1	0	2	0	4	0
40	(Ukraine)	DF	Kristian Bilovar	1	0	0	0	1	0	1	0	3	0
44	(Ukraine)	DF	Vladyslav Dubinchak	4	0	2	0	2	0	2	1	10	1
45	(Ukraine)	MF	Maksym Braharu	2	0	0	0	0	0	1	1	3	1
76	(Ukraine)	MF	Oleksandr Pikhalyonok	2	0	0	0	0	0	1	0	3	0
91	(Ukraine)	MF	Mykola Mykhaylenko	1	0	1	0	0	0	1	0	3	0
99	(Ukraine)	FW	Matviy Ponomarenko	1	0	0	0	0	0	1	0	2	0
Players away on loan:
Players who left Dynamo Kyiv during the season:
1	(Ukraine)	GK	Heorhiy Bushchan	1	0	0	0	0	0	0	0	1	0
18	(Ukraine)	MF	Oleksandr Andriyevskyi	2	0	0	0	0	0	0	0	2	0
28	(Colombia)	DF	Brayan Ceballos	1	0	0	0	0	0	0	0	1	0
			TOTALS	44	1	8	0	8	0	18	2	78	3
