= 2021–22 FC Chornomorets Odesa season =

FC Chornomorets Odesa
2021–22 season
- Owner: Vertex United
- General Director: Anatoly Mysyura
- Manager: Yuriy Moroz (until 31 December 2021); Roman Hryhorchuk (from 1 January 2022)
- Stadium: Chornomorets Stadium
- Ukrainian Premier League: 13th
- Ukrainian Cup: Round of 16
- Top goalscorer: League: Vladyslav Vanat (3); All: Vladyslav Buhay (4)
Home colours	Away colours

The 2021–22 season was the 84th season in the club's history and the 31st season of Odesa football club "Chornomorets" in the domestic league/cup of Ukraine. "The Sailors" competed in the Ukrainian Premier League and Ukrainian Cup. The season was interrupted due to the full-scale invasion of Russia in Ukraine.

== Season overview ==
=== July 2021 ===
- July 25, 2021 In the match of 1st round of the national championship Odesa team played in Chernihiv, and lost 0:3 against FC "Desna".
- July 31, 2021 Due to the poor condition of the Chornomorets stadium field "sailors" were forced to play their home match of 2nd round of the Ukrainian championship in Dnipro, where they lost 0:3 to "Dnipro-1".

=== August 2021 ===
- August 6, 2021 In the match of 3rd round of the national championship "Chornomorets" played in Kharkiv, where they lost 2:3 to the local club "Metalist 1925".
- August 16, 2021 Match of the 4th round of Ukrainian championship was played by "sailors" in Mariupol, where they beat the local FC "Mariupol" 3:2. Mykola Mykhaylenko scored his first goal playing for "Chornomorets".
- August 21, 2021 In the match of 5th round of the national championship "Chornomorets" played at home for the first time in the season, and lost 0:3 to "Shakhtar" (Donetsk).
- August 27, 2021 Match of the 6th round of Ukrainian championship "sailors" played at home 2:2 against "Oleksandriya". Vladyslav Vanat scored his first goal playing for "Chornomorets". First goal of the "Chornomorets" against "Oleksandriya" turned out to be the jubilee, 800th goal scored by "Chornomorets" players in the Ukrainian championships (UPL).

=== September 2021 ===
- September 12, 2021 In the game of 7th round of the national championship "Chornomorets" played in Uzhhorod, where they played 2:2 against "Mynai".
- September 19, 2021 Match of the 8th round of Ukrainian championship "sailors" played in Zaporizhzhia, where they lost to "FC Zorya" (Luhansk) 0:3.
- September 23, 2021 In the game of 1/16 finals of the Ukrainian Cup 2021/22 "Chornomorets" played in Ivano-Frankivsk, where they defeated 4:1 the local FC "Prykarpattya", and reached 1/8 finals of the competition. Yevhen Isayenko scored his first goal for Odesa team.
- September 27, 2021 Match of the 9th round of Ukrainian championship "sailors" played at home 1:1 against "FC Inhulets" (Petrove). Yevhen Smyrnyi scored his first goal playing for "Chornomorets".

=== October 2021 ===
- October 2, 2021 In the game of 10th round of the national championship "Chornomorets" lost (1:2) in Kovalivka to the local "FC Kolos".
- October 18, 2021 Match of the 11th round of Ukrainian championship "sailors" played at home, where they lost 0:1 to the club "Veres" from the city of Rivne.
- October 23, 2021 In the game of 12th round of the national championship "Chornomorets" drew 1:1 at home against "FC Lviv".
- October 27, 2021 Match of the 1/8 finals of the Ukrainian Cup 2021/22 "sailors" played at home, where they lost 0:3 to "Shakhtar" (Donetsk), and thus ended their participation in this competition.

=== November 2021 ===
- November 1, 2021 In the game of 13th round of the national championship "Chornomorets" played in Poltava, where they drew 0:0 with the local club "Vorskla".
- November 6, 2021 Match of the 14th round of the Ukrainian championship "sailors" played in Lviv, where they beat 4:3 local "Rukh". Heorhiy Tsitaishvili and Yuriy Tlumak scored their first goals playing for "Chornomorets".
- November 19, 2021 "Chornomorets" played his home game of 15th round of the national championship in Kyiv, where they lost 1:6 to local "Dynamo".
- November 26, 2021 Match of the 16th round of the Ukrainian championship "sailors" played at home, where they lost 0:1 to the club Desna Chernihiv.

=== December 2021 ===
- December 6, 2021 "Chornomorets" played his away game of 17th round of the national championship in Odesa, where they lost 1:3 to "Dnipro-1".
- December 12, 2021 Match of the 18th round of the Ukrainian championship "sailors" played at home, where they beat 2:1 Kharkiv's club "Metalist 1925". That was the first home victory of Odesa team this season.

== Competitions ==
=== Ukrainian Premier League ===
==== Results summary ====
Overall								Home						Away					
Pld	W	D	L	GF	GA	GD	Pts	W	D	L	GF	GA	GD	W	D	L	GF	GA	GD
18	3	5	10	20	40	−20	14	2	3	6	12	25	−13	1	2	4	8	15	−7

Last updated: 12 December 2021.
Source: Soccerway

===== Results by round =====
Round	1	2	3	4	5	6	7	8	9	10	11	12	13	14	15	16	17	18
Ground	A	H	A	A	H	H	A	A	H	A	H	H	A	H	H	H	A	H
Result	L	L	L	W	L	D	D	L	D	L	L	D	D	W	L	L	L	W
Position	16	16	16	12	14	14	13	14	14	14	15	15	15	12	13	13	13	13

Updated to match(es) played on 12 December 2021. Source: Soccerway
A = Away; H = Home; W = Win; D = Draw; L = Loss
