= Oleksandr Tymchyk =

Ukrainian footballer (born 1997)

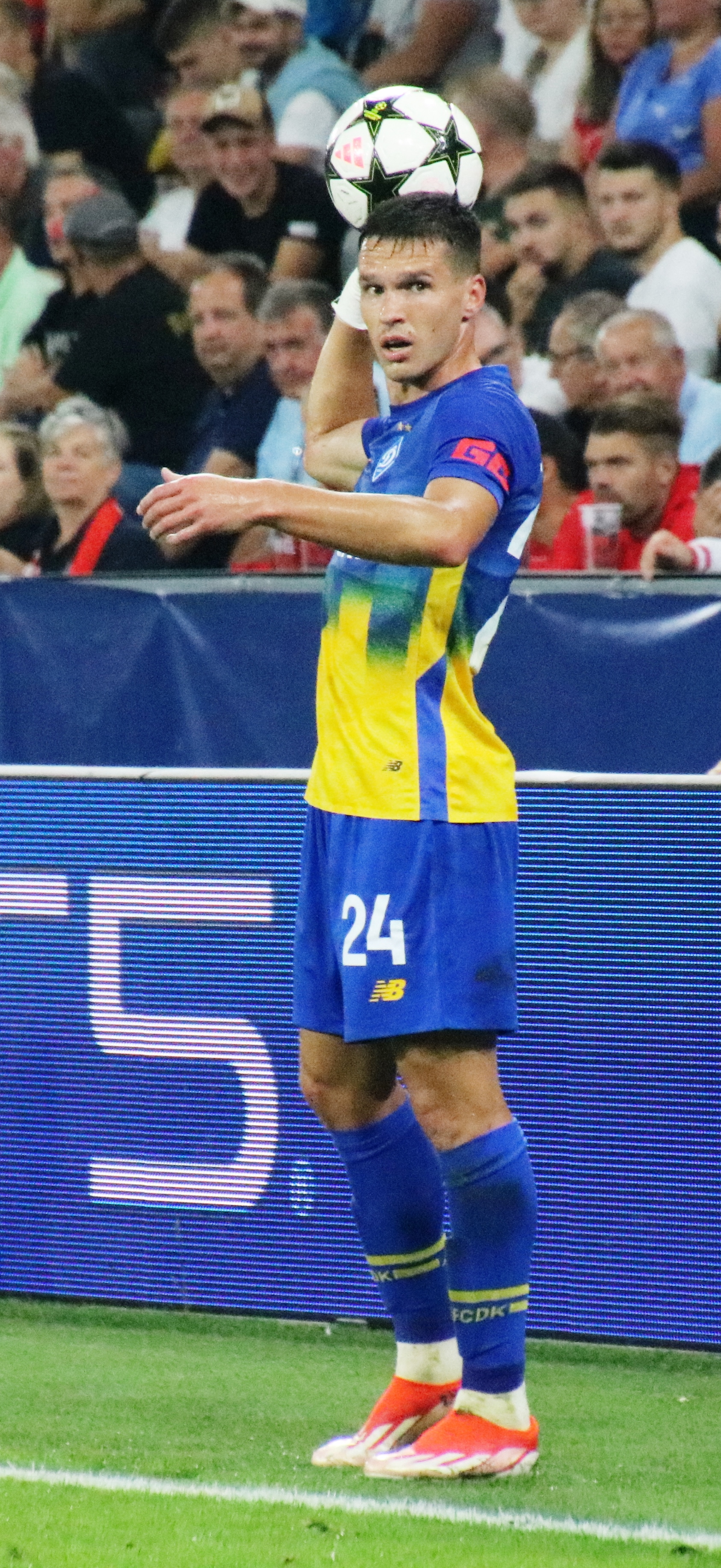
- Tymchyk playing for Dynamo Kyiv in 2024

Personal information
- Full name: Oleksandr Vasylyovych Tymchyk
- Date of birth: 20 January 1997 (age 29)
- Place of birth: Kryklyvets, Vinnytsia Oblast, Ukraine
- Height: 1.80 m (5 ft 11 in)
- Position: Right-back

Team information
- Current team: Dynamo Kyiv
- Number: 18

Youth career
- 2011–2013: FC BRW-BIK Volodymyr-Volynskyi
- 2013–2014: Dynamo Kyiv

Senior career*
Years	Team	Apps	(Gls)
2014–	Dynamo Kyiv	93	(5)
2017	→ Stal Kamianske (loan)	15	(0)
2018–2020	→ Zorya Luhansk (loan)	59	(2)

International career^{‡}
2013	Ukraine U16	4	(0)
2013–2014	Ukraine U17	12	(0)
2014–2015	Ukraine U18	9	(0)
2015–2016	Ukraine U19	7	(0)
2016	Ukraine U20	1	(0)
2016–2017	Ukraine U21	3	(0)
2020–	Ukraine	26	(1)
- * Club domestic league appearances and goals as of 23 October 2026 ‡ National team caps and goals as of 31 March 2026

Oleksandr Vasylyovych Tymchyk (Ukrainian: Олександр Васильович Тимчик; born 20 January 1997) is a Ukrainian professional footballer who plays as a right-back for Ukrainian Premier League club Dynamo Kyiv and the Ukraine national team.

== Club career ==
Tymchyk went to both BRW-BIK Volodymyr-Volynskyi and FC Dynamo youth sportive schools. His first coach was Ruslan Gan. He spent his career in the Ukrainian Premier League Reserves and was promoted to the first team in October 2016. Tymchyk made his Ukrainian Premier League debut for Dynamo Kyiv in a match against Dnipro as a starter on 6 November 2016.

On 23 December 2017, Tymtchyk was loaned with his teammate Bohdan Mykhaylichenko to the Zorya Luhansk. Then he returns to the Dynamo.

On 29 September 2021, Tymchyk played his first UEFA Champions League match against Bayern Munich. His team was beaten by five goals to zero that day.

== International career ==
On 3 September 2020, Tymchyk debuted for the Ukraine national football team in a 2–1 UEFA Nations League victory against Switzerland. He scored his first goal in a 2022–23 UEFA Nations League match against Armenia in September 2022.

Tymchyk was selected by Ukraine's coach Andriy Shevchenko in the list of 26 players to participate in UEFA Euro 2020.

On 24 September 2022, Olexandr scored his first goal in selection against Armenia during Ukraine's 0-5 victory and also offered a decisive pass to his teammate Oleksandr Zubkov.

In May 2024, he was on the list of 26 players summoned by Serhiy Rebrov for the UEFA Euro 2024.

In October 2025, during preparations for the 2026 FIFA World Cup qualification cycle, Tymchyk was forced to withdraw from the Ukraine national team squad due to injury.

== Career statistics ==
=== Club ===
As of match played 27 October 2026

Appearances and goals by club, season and competition
Club	Season	League			National cup (Note: Includes Ukrainian Cup)		Europe		Other (Note: Includes Ukrainian Super Cup)		Total	
Club	Season	Division	Apps	Goals	Apps	Goals	Apps	Goals	Apps	Goals	Apps	Goals
Dynamo Kyiv	2016–17	Ukrainian Premier League	2	0	1	0	0	0	0	0	3	0
Dynamo Kyiv	2020–21	Ukrainian Premier League	4	0	2	0	0	0	1	0	7	0
Dynamo Kyiv	2021–22	Ukrainian Premier League	12	1	1	0	4 (Note: Appearances in UEFA Champions League)	0	0	0	17	1
Dynamo Kyiv	2022–23	Ukrainian Premier League	19	1	0	0	4 (Note: One appearance in UEFA Champions League, three appearances in UEFA Europa League)	0	0	0	23	1
Dynamo Kyiv	2023–24	Ukrainian Premier League	23	2	0	0	4 (Note: Appearances in UEFA Conference League)	0	0	0	27	2
Dynamo Kyiv	2024–25	Ukrainian Premier League	20	0	2	0	7 (Note: Two appearances in UEFA Champions League, five appearances in UEFA Europa League)	0	0	0	29	0
Dynamo Kyiv	2025–26	Ukrainian Premier League	10	0	2	0	8 (Note: Four appearances in UEFA Champions League, four appearances in UEFA Conference League)	0	0	0	20	0
Dynamo Kyiv	2026–27	Ukrainian Premier League	3	1	1	0	2	0	0	0	6	1
Dynamo Kyiv	Total		93	5	9	0	29	0	1	0	132	5
Stal Kamianske (loan)	2017–18	Ukrainian Premier League	15	0	2	0	0	0	0	0	17	0
Zorya Luhansk (loan)	2017–18	Ukrainian Premier League	8	1	0	0	0	0	—		8	1
Zorya Luhansk (loan)	2018–19	Ukrainian Premier League	21	1	3	0	4 (Note: Appearances in UEFA Europa League)	0	—		28	1
Zorya Luhansk (loan)	2019–20	Ukrainian Premier League	30	0	1	0	6	0	—		37	0
Zorya Luhansk (loan)	Total		59	2	4	0	10	0	—		73	2
Career total			167	7	15	0	39	0	1	0	222	7

=== International ===
As of match played 31 March 2026

Appearances and goals by national team and year
National team	Year	Apps	Goals
Ukraine	2020	2	0
Ukraine	2021	8	0
Ukraine	2022	2	1
Ukraine	2023	3	0
Ukraine	2024	7	0
Ukraine	2025	2	0
Ukraine	2026	2	0
Total		26	1

No.	Date	Venue	Opponent	Score	Result	Competition
1.	24 September 2022	Vazgen Sargsyan Republican Stadium, Yerevan, Armenia	Armenia	1–0	5–0	2022–23 UEFA Nations League
