= Heorhiy Bushchan =

Ukrainian footballer

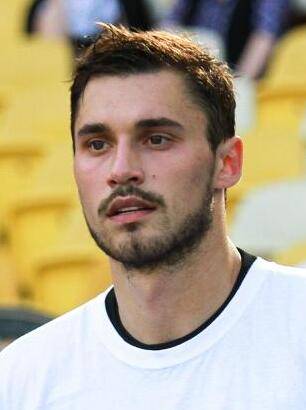
- Bushchan in 2019

Personal information
- Full name: Heorhiy Mykolayovych Bushchan
- Date of birth: 31 May 1994 (age 32)
- Place of birth: Odesa, Ukraine
- Height: 1.96 m (6 ft 5 in)
- Position: Goalkeeper

Team information
- Current team: Dynamo Kyiv (on loan from Polissya Zhytomyr)
- Number: 1

Youth career
- 2007–2009: Chornomorets Odesa
- 2009–2013: Dynamo Kyiv

Senior career*
Years	Team	Apps	(Gls)
2013–2015	Dynamo-2 Kyiv	24	(0)
2015–2025	Dynamo Kyiv	121	(0)
2025–2026	Al-Shabab	12	(0)
2025–2026	→ Polissya Zhytomyr (loan)	3	(0)
2026	→ Polissya-2 Zhytomyr (loan)	1	(0)
2026–	Polissya Zhytomyr	3	(0)
2026–	→ Dynamo Kyiv (loan)	5	(0)

International career
2010	Ukraine U16	6	(0)
2009	Ukraine U17	1	(0)
2011–2012	Ukraine U18	8	(0)
2012–2013	Ukraine U19	2	(0)
2014–2015	Ukraine U21	11	(0)
2020–2024	Ukraine	18	(0)
- * Club domestic league appearances and goals as of 23 October 2026

Heorhiy Mykolayovych Bushchan (Ukrainian: Гео́ргій Микола́йович Буща́н, Romanian: Gheorghe Nicolae Bușcean; born 31 May 1994) is a Ukrainian professional footballer who plays as a goalkeeper for Ukrainian club Dynamo Kyiv, on loan from Polissya Zhytomyr.

== Club career ==
=== Dynamo Kyiv ===
Heorhiy began playing football in Odesa, where he attended Chornomorets Odesa football school. When he was fourteen, Bushchan moved to Kyiv, where he began playing for Dynamo Kyiv youth and reserve squads. He was a part of Dynamo's first team squad on and off from the 2011–12 season onwards. He made his debut until 20 August 2017, when he helped his team to a 4–1 Ukrainian Premier League victory over Stal Kamianske at NSC "Olimpiyskiy". On 2 November 2017, he made his UEFA Europa League debut in a 1–0 victory over Young Boys Bern at Stade de Suisse. In the 2019–20 season, Bushchan established himself as Dynamo's first-choice goalkeeper.

=== Al-Shabab ===
On 29 January 2025, Bushchan joined Saudi Pro League club Al-Shabab on a two-and-a-half year deal.

=== Polissya Zhytomyr ===
On 6 September 2025, Bushchan joined Polissya Zhytomyr on a season long-loan.

== International career ==
He made his debut for the Ukraine national team on 7 October 2020 in a friendly against France, a 7–1 away loss. He made his competitive debut three days later in a Nations League game against Germany. Three days later, on 13 October 2020, he recorded his first international clean sheet in a 1–0 home victory over Spain.

Bushchan was the starting goalkeeper for Ukraine at UEFA Euro 2020 as the country reached the quarter-final stage of a European Championship for the first time.

On 7 June 2024, he was selected for Ukraine's UEFA Euro 2024 squad by the team's manager Serhiy Rebrov.

== Career statistics ==
=== Club ===
As of match played 27 October 2026

Appearances and goals by club, season and competition
Club	Season	League			Cup		Continental		Other		Total	
Club	Season	Division	Apps	Goals	Apps	Goals	Apps	Goals	Apps	Goals	Apps	Goals
Dynamo-2 Kyiv	2013–14	Ukrainian First League	4	0	—		—		—		4	0
Dynamo-2 Kyiv	2014–15	Ukrainian First League	15	0	—		—		—		15	0
Dynamo-2 Kyiv	2015–16	Ukrainian First League	5	0	—		—		—		5	0
Dynamo-2 Kyiv	Total		24	0	—		—		—		24	0
Dynamo Kyiv	2015–16	Ukrainian Premier League	0	0	0	0	0	0	—		0	0
Dynamo Kyiv	2016–17	Ukrainian Premier League	0	0	0	0	0	0	0	0	0	0
Dynamo Kyiv	2017–18	Ukrainian Premier League	6	0	3	0	3 (Note: Appearances in UEFA Europa League)	0	0	0	12	0
Dynamo Kyiv	2018–19	Ukrainian Premier League	7	0	1	0	1	0	0	0	9	0
Dynamo Kyiv	2019–20	Ukrainian Premier League	20	0	3	0	5	0	0	0	28	0
Dynamo Kyiv	2020–21	Ukrainian Premier League	23	0	0	0	11 (Note: Seven appearances in UEFA Champions League, four appearances in UEFA Europa League)	0	1 (Note: Appearance in Ukrainian Super Cup)	0	35	0
Dynamo Kyiv	2021–22	Ukrainian Premier League	15	0	0	0	5 (Note: Appearances in UEFA Champions League)	0	0	0	20	0
Dynamo Kyiv	2022–23	Ukrainian Premier League	8	0	—		8 (Note: Six appearances in UEFA Champions League, two appearances in UEFA Europa League)	0	—		16	0
Dynamo Kyiv	2023–24	Ukrainian Premier League	26	0	0	0	4 (Note: Appearances in UEFA Europa Conference League)	0	—		30	0
Dynamo Kyiv	2024–25	Ukrainian Premier League	16	0	0	0	11 (Note: Six appearances in UEFA Champions League, five appearances in UEFA Europa League)	0	—		27	0
Dynamo Kyiv	Total		121	0	7	0	48	0	1	0	177	0
Al-Shabab	2024–25	Saudi Pro League	11	0	1	0	—		—		12	0
Al-Shabab	2025–26	Saudi Pro League	1	0	—		—		—		1	0
Al-Shabab	Total		12	0	1	0	—		—		13	0
Polissya Zhytomyr (loan)	2025–26	Ukrainian Premier League	0	0	1	0	—		—		1	0
Polissya-2 Zhytomyr (loan)	2025–26	Ukrainian Second League	1	0	0	0	—		—		1	0
Dynamo Kyiv (loan)	2026–27	Ukrainian Premier League	5	0	1	0	0	0	—		6	0
Career total			163	0	10	0	48	0	1	0	222	0

=== International ===
Appearances and goals by national team and year
National team	Year	Apps	Goals
Ukraine	2020	3	0
Ukraine	2021	10	0
Ukraine	2022	2	0
Ukraine	2023	2	0
Ukraine	2024	1	0
Total		18	0

== Honours ==
Dynamo Kyiv

- Ukrainian Premier League: 2015–16, 2020–21
- Ukrainian Cup: 2019–20, 2020–21
- Ukrainian Super Cup: 2018, 2019, 2020

Individual

- Ukrainian Premier League Goalkeeper of the Year: 2020–21
