= Mykola Mykhaylenko =

Ukrainian footballer

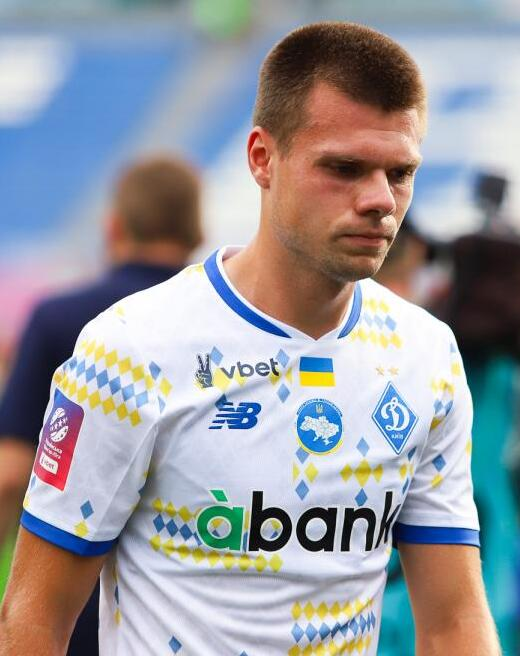

Personal information
- Full name: Mykola Mykolayovych Mykhaylenko
- Date of birth: 22 May 2001 (age 25)
- Place of birth: Varva, Ukraine
- Height: 1.81 m (5 ft 11 in)
- Position: Defensive midfielder

Team information
- Current team: Dynamo Kyiv
- Number: 91

Youth career
- 2009–2013: DYuFSh Yevropa Pryluky
- 2013–2014: Peremozhets Kyiv
- 2014–2021: Dynamo Kyiv

Senior career*
Years	Team	Apps	(Gls)
2021–	Dynamo Kyiv	49	(4)
2021–2022	→ Chornomorets Odesa (loan)	15	(2)
2022	→ Zorya Luhansk (loan)	5	(0)
2023–2024	→ Oleksandriya (loan)	30	(7)

International career^{‡}
2018	Ukraine U18	2	(2)
2020–2023	Ukraine U21	15	(0)
2024	Ukraine U23	7	(1)
2025–	Ukraine	2	(0)
- * Club domestic league appearances and goals as of 23 October 2026 ‡ National team caps and goals as of 10 June 2025

Mykola Mykolayovych Mykhaylenko (Ukrainian: Микола Миколайович Михайленко; born 22 May 2001) is a Ukrainian professional footballer who plays as a midfielder for Dynamo Kyiv and the Ukraine national team.

== Club career ==
=== Early years ===
Started his career at DYuFSh Yevropa Pryluky. Then he moved to Kyiv, where he played for Peremozhets.

=== Dynamo Kyiv ===
At the age of 13, he moved to the youth ranks of Dynamo Kyiv.

==== Loan to Chornomorets Odesa ====
In July 2021, he moved on loan to Chornomorets Odesa. On 25 July 2021, he made his league debut in the losing away match against Desna Chernihiv at the Chernihiv Stadium.

==== Loan to Oleksandriya ====
In January 2023, he moved on loan to Oleksandriya.

== International career ==
On 6 March 2024, Mykhaylenko was called up by Ruslan Rotan to the Ukraine Olympic football team preliminary squad as a preparation to the 2024 Summer Olympics.

In June 2024, he took part in the Maurice Revello Tournament in France with Ukraine. He won the tournament, beating Ivory Coast in the final.

Mykhaylenko made his debut for the Zbirna in a friendly match against Canada on June 7 2025, coming on in the 66th minute for Roman Yaremchuk.

== Personal life ==
Mykhaylenko is married to Daria, with whom he has one son, born in March 2025.

== Career statistics ==
=== Club ===
As of match played 27 October 2026

Appearances and goals by club, season and competition
Club	Season	League			Cup		Europe		Other		Total	
Club	Season	Division	Apps	Goals	Apps	Goals	Apps	Goals	Apps	Goals	Apps	Goals
Dynamo Kyiv	2021–22	Ukrainian Premier League	0	0	0	0	0	0	0	0	0	0
Dynamo Kyiv	2024–25	Ukrainian Premier League	21	2	2	0	7 (Note: Two appearances in UEFA Champions League, five appearances in UEFA Europa League)	0	—		30	2
Dynamo Kyiv	2025–26	Ukrainian Premier League	23	1	3	0	9 (Note: Two appearances in UEFA Champions League, two appearances in UEFA Europa League, five appearances and one goal in UEFA Conference League)	1	—		35	2
Dynamo Kyiv	2026–27	Ukrainian Premier League	5	1	2	0	0	0	—		7	1
Dynamo Kyiv	Total		49	4	7	0	16	1	0	0	72	5
Chornomorets Odesa (loan)	2021–22	Ukrainian Premier League	15	2	1	0	—		—		16	2
Zorya Luhansk (loan)	2022–23	Ukrainian Premier League	5	0	0	0	0	0	—		5	0
Oleksandriya (loan)	2022–23	Ukrainian Premier League	14	2	0	0	—		—		14	2
Oleksandriya (loan)	2023–24	Ukrainian Premier League	23	5	3	0	—		—		26	5
Oleksandriya (loan)	Total		36	7	3	0	—		—		40	7
Career total			105	13	11	0	16	1	0	0	133	14

=== International ===
As of match played 10 June 2025

Appearances and goals by national team and year
National team	Year	Apps	Goals
Ukraine	2025	2	0
Total		2	0

== Honours ==
Dynamo Kyiv

- Ukrainian Premier League: 2024–25
- Ukrainian Cup: 2025–26
