= Oleksandr Karavayev =

Ukrainian footballer (born 1992)

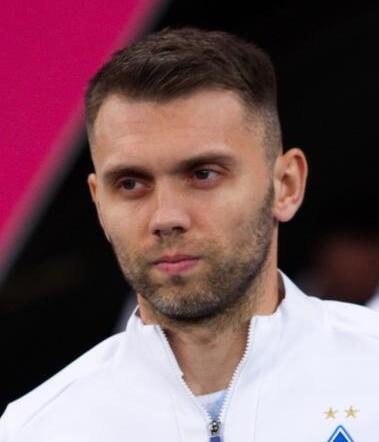
- Karavayev with Dynamo Kyiv in 2021

Personal information
- Full name: Oleksandr Oleksandrovych Karavayev
- Date of birth: 2 June 1992 (age 34)
- Place of birth: Kherson, Ukraine
- Height: 1.75 m (5 ft 9 in)
- Position: Midfielder

Team information
- Current team: Shakhtar Donetsk
- Number: 20

Youth career
- 2005: FC Osvita Kherson
- 2005–2009: Shakhtar Donetsk

Senior career*
Years	Team	Apps	(Gls)
2009–2017	Shakhtar Donetsk	0	(0)
2009–2010	→ Shakhtar-3 Donetsk	24	(9)
2012–2014	→ Sevastopol (loan)	60	(8)
2014–2016	→ Zorya Luhansk (loan)	66	(16)
2017	→ Fenerbahçe (loan)	3	(0)
2017–2019	Zorya Luhansk	57	(9)
2019–2026	Dynamo Kyiv	149	(11)
2026–	Shakhtar Donetsk	9	(0)

International career^{‡}
2007–2009	Ukraine U16	10	(3)
2008–2009	Ukraine U17	12	(2)
2009–2010	Ukraine U18	17	(0)
2010–2011	Ukraine U19	9	(1)
2012	Ukraine U20	1	(0)
2011–2014	Ukraine U21	27	(1)
2015–	Ukraine	50	(3)
- * Club domestic league appearances and goals as of 30 October 2026 ‡ National team caps and goals as of 13 November 2025

Oleksandr Oleksandrovych Karavayev (Ukrainian: Олекса́ндр Олекса́ндрович Карава́єв, born 2 June 1992) is a Ukrainian professional footballer who plays as a midfielder for Shakhtar Donetsk and the Ukraine national team.

== Club career ==
Karavayev was born in Kherson, Ukraine. In 2017, he played for Fenerbahçe SK in the Süper Lig on loan from FC Shakhtar Donetsk. He signed six-month loan deal with the club.

== International career ==
Karavayev was a member of different Ukrainian national football teams. He was a member of the Ukraine U21, called up by Pavlo Yakovenko for a friendly match against the Czech Republic on 17 November 2010.

== Career statistics ==
=== Club ===
As of 30 October 2026

Appearances and goals by club, season and competition
Club	Season	League			Cup		Continental		Other		Total	
Club	Season	Division	Apps	Goals	Apps	Goals	Apps	Goals	Apps	Goals	Apps	Goals
Shakhtar-3 Donetsk	2008–09	Ukrainian Second League	1	0	—		—		—		1	0
Shakhtar-3 Donetsk	2009–10	Ukrainian Second League	13	5	—		—		3 (Note: Appearance(s) in Ukrainian League Cup)	1	16	6
Shakhtar-3 Donetsk	2010–11	Ukrainian Second League	10	4	—		—		—		10	4
Shakhtar-3 Donetsk	Total		24	9	—		—		3	1	27	10
Sevastopol (loan)	2011–12	Ukrainian First League	10	1	0	0	—		—		10	1
Sevastopol (loan)	2012–13	Ukrainian First League	26	5	5	1	—		—		31	6
Sevastopol (loan)	2013–14	Ukrainian Premier League	24	2	1	0	—		—		25	2
Sevastopol (loan)	Total		60	8	6	1	—		—		66	9
Zorya Luhansk (loan)	2014–15	Ukrainian Premier League	24	2	4	0	6 (Note: Appearance(s) in UEFA Europa League)	0	—		34	2
Zorya Luhansk (loan)	2015–16	Ukrainian Premier League	25	8	8	4	4	0	—		37	12
Zorya Luhansk (loan)	2016–17	Ukrainian Premier League	17	6	1	0	6	0	—		24	6
Zorya Luhansk (loan)	Total		66	16	13	4	16	0	—		95	20
Fenerbahçe (loan)	2016–17	Süper Lig	3	0	3	1	0	0	—		6	1
Zorya Luhansk	2017–18	Ukrainian Premier League	26	1	1	0	6	0	—		33	1
Zorya Luhansk	2018–19	Ukrainian Premier League	31	8	3	0	4	2	—		38	10
Zorya Luhansk	Total		57	9	4	0	10	2	—		71	11
Dynamo Kyiv	2019–20	Ukrainian Premier League	28	0	3	0	5 (Note: One appearance in UEFA Champions League, four appearances in UEFA Europa League)	0	1 (Note: Appearance(s) in Ukrainian Super Cup)	0	37	0
Dynamo Kyiv	2020–21	Ukrainian Premier League	23	2	3	0	10 (Note: Seven appearances in UEFA Champions League, three appearances in UEFA Europa League)	0	1	0	37	2
Dynamo Kyiv	2021–22	Ukrainian Premier League	18	0	1	0	6 (Note: Appearance(s) in UEFA Champions League)	0	1	0	26	0
Dynamo Kyiv	2022–23	Ukrainian Premier League	20	0	0	0	10 (Note: Six appearances and two goals in UEFA Champions League, four appearances in UEFA Europa League)	0	—		30	0
Dynamo Kyiv	2023–24	Ukrainian Premier League	21	2	1	0	3 (Note: Appearance(s) in UEFA Conference League)	0	—		25	2
Dynamo Kyiv	2024–25	Ukrainian Premier League	17	3	3	0	9 (Note: Five appearances and two goals in UEFA Champions League, four appearances in UEFA Europa League)	2	—		29	5
Dynamo Kyiv	2025–26	Ukrainian Premier League	22	4	4	0	7 (Note: One appearance in UEFA Champions League, two appearances in UEFA Europa League, four appearances in UEFA Conference League)	0	—		32	4
Dynamo Kyiv	Total		149	11	15	0	50	2	3	0	216	13
Shakhtar Donetsk	2026–27	Ukrainian Premier League	9	0	0	0	0	0	—		9	0
Career total			368	53	41	6	76	4	6	1	490	64

=== International ===
As of match played 13 November 2025

Appearances and goals by national team and year
National team	Year	Apps	Goals
Ukraine	2015	2	0
Ukraine	2016	3	0
Ukraine	2017	3	0
Ukraine	2018	10	1
Ukraine	2019	7	0
Ukraine	2020	2	0
Ukraine	2021	13	0
Ukraine	2022	6	1
Ukraine	2023	3	1
Ukraine	2024	0	0
Ukraine	2025	1	0
Total		50	3

Scores and results list Ukraine's goal tally first, score column indicates score after each Karavayev goal.

List of international goals scored by Oleksandr Karavayev
No.	Date	Venue	Opponent	Score	Result	Competition
1	27 March 2018	Stade Maurice Dufrasne, Liège, Belgium	Japan	2–1	2–1	Friendly
2	11 June 2022	Stadion Miejski ŁKS, Łódź, Poland	Armenia	2–0	3–0	2022–23 UEFA Nations League B
3	14 October 2023	Stadion Letná, Prague, Czech Republic	North Macedonia	2–0	2–0	UEFA Euro 2024 qualifying

== Honours ==
=== Club ===
Sevastopol

- Ukrainian First League: 2012–13

Zorya Luhansk

- Ukrainian Cup: runner-up 2015–16

Dynamo Kyiv

- Ukrainian Premier League: 2020–21, 2024–25
- Ukrainian Cup: 2019–20, 2020–21, 2025–26
- Ukrainian Super Cup: 2019, 2020

=== Individual ===
- Ukrainian Cup top scorer: 2015–16
