= Mykola Shaparenko =

Ukrainian footballer

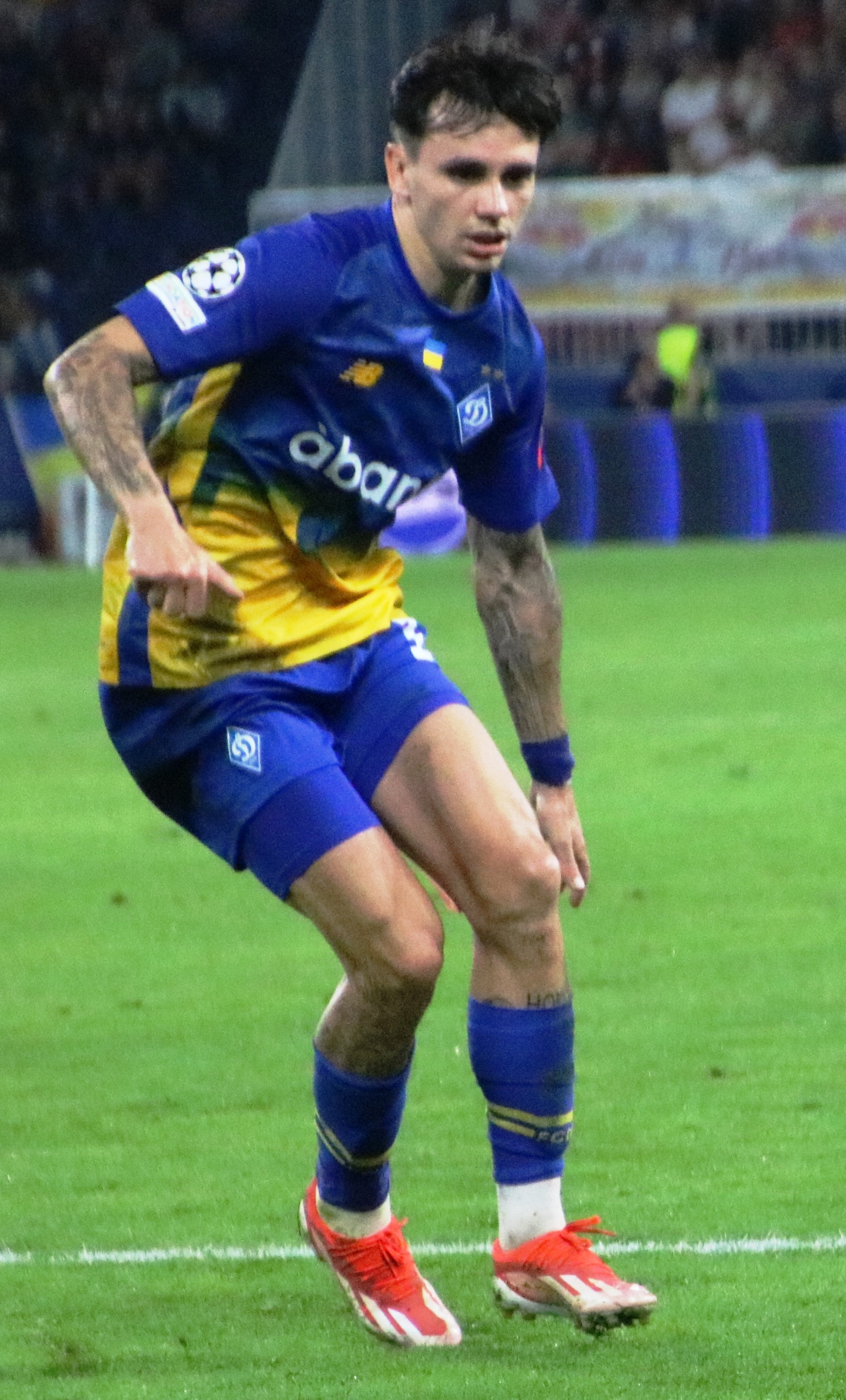
- Shaparenko playing for Dynamo Kyiv in 2024

Personal information
- Full name: Mykola Volodymyrovych Shaparenko
- Date of birth: 4 October 1998 (age 28)
- Place of birth: Rozdolne, Ukraine
- Height: 1.78 m (5 ft 10 in)
- Position: Midfielder

Team information
- Current team: Dynamo Kyiv
- Number: 10

Youth career
- 2010–2011: Youth Sportive School #4 Mariupol
- 2011–2014: Illichivets Mariupol
- 2015–2017: Dynamo Kyiv

Senior career*
Years	Team	Apps	(Gls)
2014–2015	Illichivets Mariupol	2	(1)
2017–	Dynamo Kyiv	168	(25)

International career^{‡}
2015–2016	Ukraine U18	4	(1)
2016–2017	Ukraine U19	6	(1)
2018	Ukraine U21	1	(1)
2018–	Ukraine	52	(2)
- * Club domestic league appearances and goals as of 23 October 2026 ‡ National team caps and goals as of 28 September 2026

Mykola Volodymyrovych Shaparenko (Ukrainian: Мико́ла Володи́мирович Шапаре́нко; born 4 October 1998) is a Ukrainian professional footballer who plays as a midfielder for Ukrainian Premier League club Dynamo Kyiv and the Ukraine national team. Shaparenko is one of the youngest players to have scored in the Ukrainian Premier League.

== Club career ==
Shaparenko made his senior debut for Illichivets Mariupol as a substitute player in a 6–2 loss against Shakhtar Donetsk in the Ukrainian Premier League on 5 April 2015.

In June 2015, Shaparenko signed a contract with FC Dynamo Kyiv. After playing for Dynamo's youth and reserve teams for two seasons, he made his senior team debut on 18 November 2017 at Zirka Stadium, as a stoppage-time substitute in a 2–0 victory over FC Zirka Kropyvnytskyi.

== International career ==
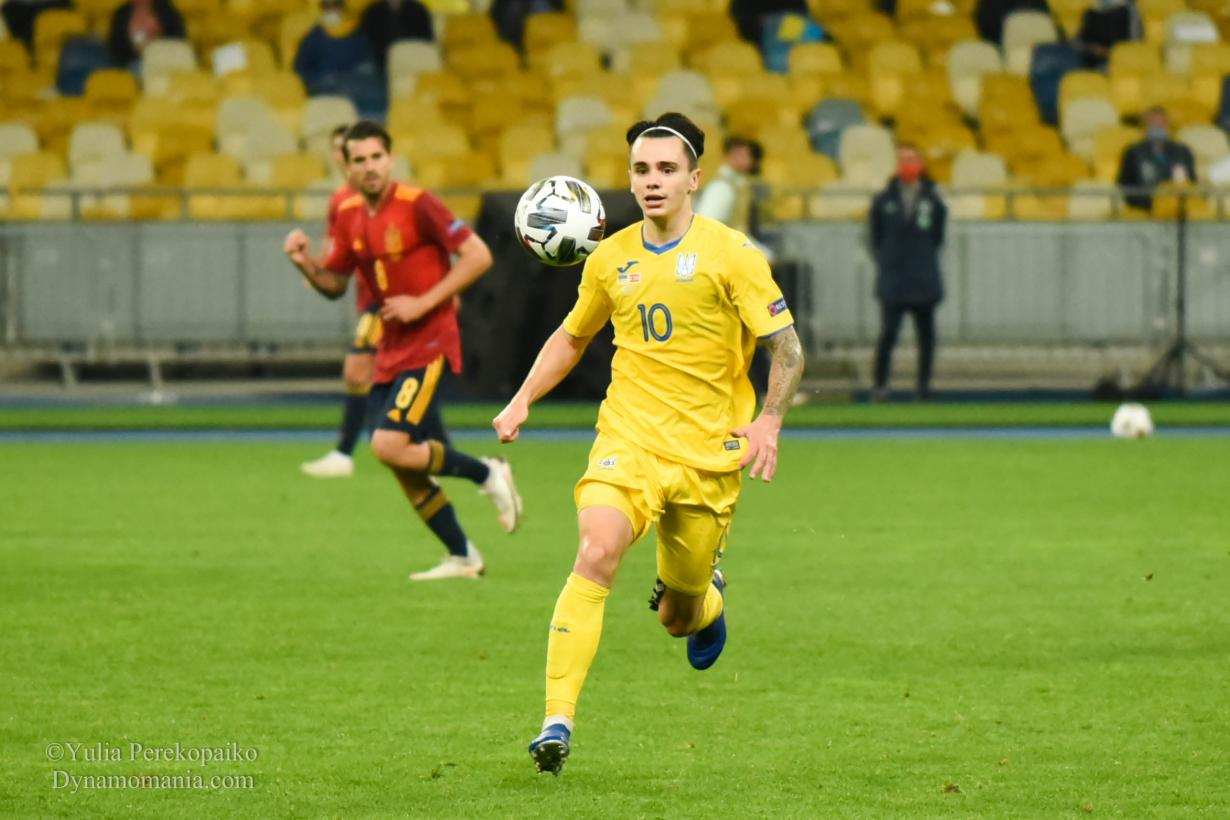
Shaparenko in 2021 with Ukraine

On 31 May 2018, Shaparenko debuted for the Ukraine national football team at Stade de Genève, coming on as a substitute in a goalless friendly draw against Morocco.

In June 2021, he is on the list of 26 players summoned by Andriy Shevchenko to compete for the UEFA Euro 2020.

In May 2024, he was on the list of 26 players summoned by Serhiy Rebrov for the UEFA Euro 2024.

== Personal life ==
Shaparenko is married to Kristina, daughter of former Dynamo Kyiv player, Maksim Shatskikh, whom he wed in 2025.

== Career statistics ==
=== Club ===
As of match played 27 October 2026

Appearances and goals by club, season and competition
Club	Season	League			Ukrainian Cup		Europe		Other		Total	
Club	Season	Division	Apps	Goals	Apps	Goals	Apps	Goals	Apps	Goals	Apps	Goals
Illichivets Mariupol	2014–15	Ukrainian Premier League	2	1	0	0	—		—		2	1
Dynamo Kyiv	2017–18	Ukrainian Premier League	14	1	2	0	5 (Note: Appearance(s) in UEFA Europa League)	0	0	0	21	1
Dynamo Kyiv	2018–19	Ukrainian Premier League	22	5	2	2	8 (Note: One appearance in UEFA Champions League, seven appearances and one goal in UEFA Europa League)	1	1 (Note: Appearance in Ukrainian Super Cup)	0	33	8
Dynamo Kyiv	2019–20	Ukrainian Premier League	15	1	2	0	1	0	0	0	18	1
Dynamo Kyiv	2020–21	Ukrainian Premier League	24	4	3	0	11 (Note: Eight appearances and one goal in UEFA Champions League, three appearances in UEFA Europa League)	1	1	0	39	5
Dynamo Kyiv	2021–22	Ukrainian Premier League	13	3	1	0	6 (Note: Appearance(s) in UEFA Champions League)	0	1	0	21	3
Dynamo Kyiv	2022–23	Ukrainian Premier League	5	0	—		7 (Note: Six appearances in UEFA Champions League, one appearance in UEFA Europa League)	0	—		12	0
Dynamo Kyiv	2023–24	Ukrainian Premier League	22	4	0	0	4 (Note: Appearances in UEFA Europa Conference League)	1	—		26	5
Dynamo Kyiv	2024–25	Ukrainian Premier League	23	5	3	1	12 (Note: Six appearances and one goal in UEFA Champions League, six appearances in UEFA Europa League)	1	—		38	7
Dynamo Kyiv	2025–26	Ukrainian Premier League	24	2	3	0	10 (Note: Four appearances in UEFA Champions League, two appearances in UEFA Europa League, four appearances in UEFA Conference League)	0	—		37	2
Dynamo Kyiv	2026–27	Ukrainian Premier League	6	0	1	0	6 (Note: Four appearances in UEFA Europa League, two appearances in UEFA Conference League)	0	—		13	0
Dynamo Kyiv	Total		168	25	17	3	70	4	3	0	258	32
Career total			170	26	17	3	70	4	3	0	260	33

=== International ===
As of match played 28 September 2026

Appearances and goals by national team and year
National team	Year	Apps	Goals
Ukraine	2018	4	0
Ukraine	2019	0	0
Ukraine	2020	3	0
Ukraine	2021	16	1
Ukraine	2022	5	0
Ukraine	2023	0	0
Ukraine	2024	12	1
Ukraine	2025	8	0
Ukraine	2026	4	0
Total		52	2

Scores and results list Ukraine's goal tally first.

List of international goals scored by Mykola Shaparenko
No.	Date	Venue	Opponent	Score	Result	Competition
1.	4 September 2021	Olympic Stadium, Kyiv, Ukraine	France	1–0	1–1	2022 FIFA World Cup qualification
2.	21 June 2024	Merkur Spiel-Arena, Düsseldorf, Germany	Slovakia	1–1	2–1	UEFA Euro 2024

== Honours ==
Dynamo Kyiv

- Ukrainian Premier League: 2020–21, 2024–25
- Ukrainian Cup: 2019–20, 2020–21, 2025–26
- Ukrainian Super Cup: 2018, 2019, 2020
