= Denys Popov =

Ukrainian footballer

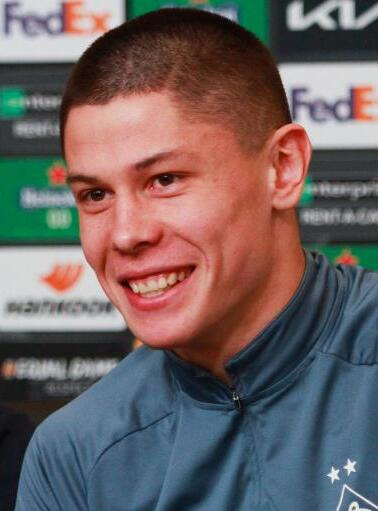
- Denys Popov at training

Personal information
- Full name: Denys Yuriyovych Popov
- Date of birth: 17 February 1999 (age 27)
- Place of birth: Myhiia, Mykolaiv Oblast, Ukraine
- Height: 1.86 m (6 ft 1 in)
- Position: Centre-back

Team information
- Current team: Dynamo Kyiv
- Number: 4

Youth career
- 201?–2014: RVUFK Kyiv
- 2015–2017: Dynamo Kyiv

Senior career*
Years	Team	Apps	(Gls)
2017–	Dynamo Kyiv	108	(8)

International career^{‡}
2015–2016	Ukraine U17	9	(1)
2017	Ukraine U18	1	(0)
2016–2018	Ukraine U19	11	(1)
2019	Ukraine U20	6	(3)
2018–2021	Ukraine U21	10	(1)
2021–	Ukraine	3	(0)
Medal record
Men's football
Representing Ukraine
UEFA European Under-19 Championship
Bronze medal – third place	2018 Finland
FIFA U-20 World Cup
Winner	2019 Poland
- * Club domestic league appearances and goals as of 24 May 2026 ‡ National team caps and goals as of 14 June 2022

Denys Yuriyovych Popov (Ukrainian: Дени́с Ю́рійович Попо́в; born 17 February 1999) is a Ukrainian professional footballer who plays as a centre-back for Dynamo Kyiv.

== Club career ==
Born in Pervomaisk Raion, Popov is a product of the RVUFK Kyiv and Dynamo Kyiv youth sportive schools.

He played for FC Dynamo in the Ukrainian Premier League Reserves and in July 2017 he was promoted to the senior squad team. Popov made his debut in the Ukrainian Premier League for Dynamo Kyiv only on 13 April 2019, playing in a winning match against FC Mariupol.

== International career ==
In 2019, Popov played a key role in Ukraine U20's first ever FIFA U-20 World Cup title. He appeared in six of his team's seven matches at the tournament, scoring three goals. He missed the final against South Korea after being sent off in the semifinal match against Italy.

He made his debut for Ukraine national team on 23 May 2021 in a friendly against Bahrain.

== Career statistics ==
=== Club ===
As of match played 24 May 2026

Appearances and goals by club, season and competition
Club	Season	League			Cup		Continental		Other		Total	
Club	Season	Division	Apps	Goals	Apps	Goals	Apps	Goals	Apps	Goals	Apps	Goals
Dynamo Kyiv	2018–19	Ukrainian Premier League	1	0	0	0	0	0	0	0	1	0
Dynamo Kyiv	2019–20	Ukrainian Premier League	16	1	3	1	3 (Note: Appearances in UEFA Europa League)	0	0	0	22	2
Dynamo Kyiv	2020–21	Ukrainian Premier League	15	2	2	0	8 (Note: Six appearances and one goal in UEFA Champions League, two appearances in UEFA Europa League)	1	0	0	25	3
Dynamo Kyiv	2021–22	Ukrainian Premier League	1	1	0	0	0	0	0	0	1	1
Dynamo Kyiv	2022–23	Ukrainian Premier League	18	1	—		6 (Note: Four appearances in UEFA Champions League, two appearances in UEFA Europa League)	0	—		24	1
Dynamo Kyiv	2023–24	Ukrainian Premier League	24	1	1	0	3 (Note: Appearances in UEFA Europa Conference League)	0	—		28	1
Dynamo Kyiv	2024–25	Ukrainian Premier League	21	1	3	0	11 (Note: Six appearances and one goal in UEFA Champions League, five appearances in UEFA Europa League)	1	—		35	2
Dynamo Kyiv	2025–26	Ukrainian Premier League	12	1	2	0	8 (Note: Three appearances in UEFA Champions League, two appearances in UEFA Europa League, three appearances and one goal in UEFA Conference League)	1	—		22	2
Dynamo Kyiv	Total		108	8	11	1	39	3	0	0	158	12
Career total			108	7	11	1	39	3	0	0	158	12

=== International ===
As of 14 June 2022

Appearances and goals by national team and year
National team	Year	Apps	Goals
Ukraine	2021	1	0
Ukraine	2022	2	0
Total		3	0

== Honours ==
Dynamo Kyiv

- Ukrainian Premier League: 2020–21, 2024–25
- Ukrainian Cup: 2019–20, 2020–21, 2025–26
- Ukrainian Super Cup: 2018, 2019, 2020

Ukraine U20

- FIFA U-20 World Cup: 2019
