= 2021–22 FC Dynamo Kyiv season =

Dynamo Kyiv
2021–22 season
- Owner: Ihor Surkis
- President: Ihor Surkis
- Head coach: Mircea Lucescu
- Stadium: NSC Olimpiyskiy
- Ukrainian Premier League: 2nd (cancelled)
- Ukrainian Cup: Quarter-finals (cancelled)
- Ukrainian Super Cup: Runners-up
- UEFA Champions League: Group stage
Home colours	Away colours	Third colours

The 2021–22 season was the 95th season in the existence of FC Dynamo Kyiv and the club's 31st consecutive season in the top flight of Ukrainian football. In addition to the domestic league, Dynamo Kyiv participated in this season's editions of the Ukrainian Cup, the Ukrainian Super Cup, and the UEFA Champions League.

== Players ==
=== First-team squad ===
As of 21 January 2022

Note: Flags indicate national team as defined under FIFA eligibility rules; some limited exceptions apply. Players may hold more than one non-FIFA nationality.

No.	Pos.	Nation	Player
1	GK	UKR	Heorhiy Bushchan
4	DF	UKR	Denys Popov
5	MF	UKR	Serhiy Sydorchuk (captain)
6	DF	UKR	Mykyta Burda
7	MF	SLO	Benjamin Verbič
8	MF	UKR	Volodymyr Shepelyev
9	FW	VEN	Eric Ramírez
10	MF	UKR	Mykola Shaparenko
13	DF	UKR	Artem Shabanov
14	MF	URU	Carlos de Pena
15	MF	UKR	Viktor Tsyhankov (vice-captain)
18	MF	UKR	Oleksandr Andriyevskyi
19	MF	UKR	Denys Harmash
20	DF	UKR	Oleksandr Karavayev
22	FW	BRA	Vitinho

No.	Pos.	Nation	Player
24	DF	UKR	Oleksandr Tymchyk
25	DF	UKR	Illya Zabarnyi
26	MF	UKR	Oleksandr Yatsyk
28	FW	UKR	Vladyslav Kulach
29	MF	UKR	Vitaliy Buyalskyi (vice-captain)
34	DF	UKR	Oleksandr Syrota
35	GK	UKR	Ruslan Neshcheret
41	FW	UKR	Artem Besyedin
51	GK	UKR	Valentyn Morhun
71	GK	UKR	Denys Boyko
73	FW	BLR	Ilya Shkurin (on loan from CSKA Moscow)
89	FW	UKR	Vladyslav Supriaha
94	DF	POL	Tomasz Kędziora
99	MF	UKR	Denys Antyukh
—	DF	UKR	Vladyslav Dubinchak

== Pre-season and friendlies ==
Win Draw Loss

1 July 2021 Friendly	Basel (Switzerland)	4–4	(Ukraine) Dynamo Kyiv	Vevey, Switzerland
19:00 CEST (UTC+2)	Kasami 36'; Cabral 45' (pen.), 60'; Marchand 82'	Report	Antyukh 23'; Syrota 30'; Lyednyev 49'; Korobenko 66'	Stadium: Stade de Copet; Attendance: 500; Referee: Urs Schnyder

3 July 2021 Friendly	Lausanne-Sport (Switzerland)	1–1	(Ukraine) Dynamo Kyiv	Lausanne, Switzerland
15:00 CEST (UTC+2)	Ribeiro 48'	Report	Rodrigues 8' (pen.)	Stadium: Stade de la Tuilière

7 July 2021 Friendly	Luzern (Switzerland)	3–3	(Ukraine) Dynamo Kyiv	Luzern, Switzerland
16:00 CEST (UTC+2)	Sorgić 9', 63'; Ugrinic 16'	Report	Lyednyev 56'; Antyukh 81'; Harmash (yellow card) 76', (goal) 88'	Stadium: Swissporarena

10 July 2021 Friendly	Servette (Switzerland)	1–1	(Ukraine) Dynamo Kyiv	Meyrin, Switzerland
20:00 CEST (UTC+2)	Imeri 13'	Report	Shkurin 85'	Stadium: Stade des Arbères

14 July 2021 Friendly	Sion (Switzerland)	0–2	(Ukraine) Dynamo Kyiv	Sion, Switzerland
19:00 CEST (UTC+2)		Report	Rodrigues 24'; Shkurin 27'	Stadium: Stade Tourbillon

17 July 2021 Friendly	Nice (France)	2–1	(Ukraine) Dynamo Kyiv	Meyrin, Switzerland
20:00 CEST (UTC+2)	Atal (yellow card) 39'; Pelmard (yellow card) 52'; Ndoye 70'; Trouillet 80', (yellow card) 86'	Report	Shkurin (yellow card) 37', (goal) 38'	Stadium: Stade des Arbères; Attendance: 500

20 July 2021 Friendly	Athletic Bilbao (Spain)	1–0	(Ukraine) Dynamo Kyiv	Winterthur, Switzerland
15:00 CEST (UTC+2)	I. Williams 75'	Report		Stadium: Stadion Schützenwiese; Referee: Mirel Turkes

23 July 2021 Friendly	Dynamo Kyiv (Ukraine)	1–1	(Germany) Union Berlin	Kematen in Tirol, Austria
17:00 CEST (UTC+2)	Rodrigues (yellow card) 30'; Harmash (yellow card) 32'; Verbič 47'	Report	Voglsammer 36'; Andrich (yellow card) 44'	Stadium: Sportplatz Kematen

4 August 2021 Friendly	Fenerbahçe (Turkey)	1–1	(Ukraine) Dynamo Kyiv	Istanbul, Turkey
18:00 CEST (UTC+2)	Pelkas 63'	Report	Lyednyev 28'; Harmash (yellow card) 84'	Stadium: Atatürk Olympic Stadium; Referee: Cağdaş Altay

14 August 2021 Friendly	Internazionale (Italy)	3–0	(Ukraine) Dynamo Kyiv	Monza, Italy
18:30 CEST (UTC+2)	Barella 13'; Džeko 34'; Sensi 60'			Stadium: U-Power Stadium; Referee: Marco Piccinini

22 January 2022 Friendly	Dynamo Kyiv (Ukraine)	4–0	(Luxembourg) Racing-Union	San Pedro del Pinatar, Spain
17:00 CET (UTC+1)				Stadium: Pinatar Arena Football Center

25 January 2022 Friendly	Dynamo Kyiv (Ukraine)	3–1	(Spain) Real Murcia	San Pedro del Pinatar, Spain
11:00 CET (UTC+1)				Stadium: Pinatar Arena Football Center

27 January 2022 Friendly	Dynamo Kyiv (Ukraine)	1–1	(Norway) Bodø/Glimt	Algorfa, Spain
11:00 CET (UTC+1)	Vitinho 20'		Bonface 38'	Stadium: La Finca Golf & Spa Resort

15 February 2022 Friendly	Dynamo Kyiv (Ukraine)	4–0	(Kazakhstan) Kairat	Turkey
16:00 EET (UTC+2)		Report

17 February 2022 Friendly	Dynamo Kyiv (Ukraine)	2–0	(Latvia) Valmiera	Turkey
16:00 EET (UTC+2)

12 April 2022 Global Tour for Peace	Legia Warsaw (Poland)	1–3	(Ukraine) Dynamo Kyiv	Warsaw, Poland
20:30 EET (UTC+2)	Strzałek 54'	Report	Buyalskyi 4'; Besedin 56', 71'	Stadium: Stadion Wojska Polskiego; Attendance: 20,000

14 April 2022 Global Tour for Peace	Galatasaray (Turkey)	1–3	(Ukraine) Dynamo Kyiv	Sarıyer, Istanbul, Turkey
16:00 EET (UTC+2)	Yılmaz 56'	Report	Buyalskyi 14'; Besedin 28'; Tsygankov 81'	Stadium: Türk Telekom Stadium; Attendance: 6,726

20 April 2022 Global Tour for Peace	CFR Cluj (Romania)	0–0	(Ukraine) Dynamo Kyiv	Cluj-Napoca, Romania
21:30 EET (UTC+2)		Report		Stadium: Stadionul Dr. Constantin Rădulescu

26 April 2022 Global Tour for Peace	Borussia Dortmund (Germany)	2–3	(Ukraine) Dynamo Kyiv	Dortmund, Germany
18:00 CEST (UTC+2)	Bynoe-Gittens 4'; Reinier (penalty missed) 54'; Rothe 65'	Report	Buyalskyi 9'; Vanat 11', 35'; Shaparenko (penalty missed) 17'	Stadium: Signal Iduna Park; Attendance: 35,000; Referee: Denys Shurman

28 April 2022 Global Tour for Peace	Dinamo Zagreb (Croatia)	2–2	(Ukraine) Dynamo Kyiv	Zagreb, Croatia
18:00 CEST (UTC+2)	Vukotić 29'; Menalo 38'; Hrvoj (yellow card) 80'	Report	Vanat 8', 16'; Popov (yellow card) 59'	Stadium: Stadion Maksimir

4 May 2022 Global Tour for Peace	Basel (Switzerland)	2–3	(Ukraine) Dynamo Kyiv	Basel, Switzerland
18:00 CEST (UTC+2)	Szalai 43'; Esposito 61'	Report	Karavayev 23'; Andriyevskyi 78'; Popov 81'	Stadium: St. Jakob-Park; Attendance: 15,391; Referee: Esther Staubli

13 May 2022 Global Tour for Peace	Flora (Estonia)	0–3	(Ukraine) Dynamo Kyiv	Tallinn, Estonia
18:00 CEST (UTC+2)		Report	Voloshyn 16'; Burda 42'; Vanat 60'	Stadium: A. Le Coq Arena; Attendance: 4,550

== Competitions ==
=== Overall record ===
Competition	First match	Last match	Starting round	Final position	Record							
Competition	First match	Last match	Starting round	Final position	Pld	W	D	L	GF	GA	GD	Win %
Ukrainian Premier League	1 August 2021	12 December 2021	Matchday 1	Cancelled	18	14	3	1	47	9	+38	77.78
Ukrainian Cup	27 October 2021	27 October 2021	Round of 16	Cancelled	1	1	0	0	2	1	+1	100.00
Ukrainian Super Cup	22 September 2021		Final	Runners-up	1	0	0	1	0	3	−3	0.00
UEFA Champions League	14 September 2021	8 December 2021	Group stage	Group stage	6	0	1	5	1	11	−10	0.00
Total					26	15	4	7	50	24	+26	57.69

Source: Soccerway

=== Ukrainian Premier League ===
==== League table ====
Pos	Team	Pld	W	D	L	GF	GA	GD	Pts	Qualification or relegation
1	Shakhtar Donetsk	18	15	2	1	49	10	+39	47	Qualification for the Champions League group stage
2	Dynamo Kyiv	18	14	3	1	47	9	+38	45	Qualification for the Champions League second qualifying round
3	Dnipro-1	18	13	1	4	35	17	+18	40	Qualification for the Europa League play-off round
4	Zorya Luhansk	18	11	3	4	37	19	+18	36	Qualification for the Europa Conference League third qualifying round
5	Vorskla Poltava	18	9	6	3	30	18	+12	33	Qualification for the Europa Conference League second qualifying round

Source: upl.ua
Rules for classification: 1) Points; 2) Head-to-head points; 3) Head-to-head goal difference; 4) Head-to-head higher number of goals scored; 5) Goal difference; 6) higher number of goals scored; 7) Draw or "Golden match" if two teams tied for title (Article 22, paragraph 3).

==== Matches ====
1 August 2021 2	Dynamo Kyiv	4–0	Veres Rivne	Kyiv
				Stadium: NSC Olimpiyskyi

8 August 2021 3	Zorya Luhansk	1–2	Dynamo Kyiv	[[]]
				Stadium: [[]]

11 August 2021 1	Dynamo Kyiv	2–0	Mynai	Kyiv
				Stadium: NSC Olimpiyskyi

18 August 2021 4	Inhulets Petrove	1–1	Dynamo Kyiv	[[]]
				Stadium: [[]]

22 August 2021 5	Dynamo Kyiv	4–0	Desna Chernihiv	Kyiv
				Stadium: NSC Olimpiyskyi

28 August 2021 6	Dynamo Kyiv	7–0	Kolos Kovalivka	Kyiv
				Stadium: NSC Olimpiyskyi

11 September 2021 7	Metalist 1925 Kharkiv	0–2	Dynamo Kyiv	[[]]
				Stadium: [[]]

18 September 2021 8	Dynamo Kyiv	1–0	FC Oleksandriya	Kyiv
				Stadium: NSC Olimpiyskyi

25 September 2021 9	Rukh Lviv	0–2	Dynamo Kyiv	Lviv
				Stadium: Arena Lviv

3 October 2021 10	Dynamo Kyiv	0–0	Shakhtar Donetsk	Kyiv
				Stadium: NSC Olimpiyskyi

16 October 2021 11	FC Lviv	1–4	Dynamo Kyiv	Lviv
				Stadium: Arena Lviv

24 October 2021 12	Dynamo Kyiv	2–0	SC Dnipro-1	Kyiv
				Stadium: NSC Olimpiyskyi

30 October 2021 13	FC Mariupol	2–3	Dynamo Kyiv	Mariupol
				Stadium: Volodymyr Boiko Stadium

6 November 2021 14	Dynamo Kyiv	1–2	Vorskla Poltava	Kyiv
				Stadium: NSC Olimpiyskyi

19 November 2021 15	Chornomorets Odesa	1–6	Dynamo Kyiv	[[]]
				Stadium: [[]]

27 November 2021 16	Mynai	0–2	Dynamo Kyiv	Uzhhorod
				Stadium: Avanhard Stadium

4 December 2021 17	Veres Rivne	0–3	Dynamo Kyiv	Lutsk
				Stadium: Avanhard Stadium (Lutsk)

12 December 2021 18	Dynamo Kyiv	1–1	Zorya Luhansk	Kyiv
				Stadium: NSC Olimpiyskyi

26 February 2022 19	Dynamo Kyiv	Cancelled	Inhulets Petrove	Kyiv
				Stadium: NSC Olimpiyskyi

6 March 2022 20	Desna Chernihiv	Cancelled	Dynamo Kyiv	Chernihiv
				Stadium: Chernihiv Stadium

12 March 2022 21	Kolos Kovalivka	Cancelled	Dynamo Kyiv	Kovalivka
				Stadium: Kolos Stadium

17 March 2022 22	Dynamo Kyiv	Cancelled	Metalist 1925 Kharkiv	Kyiv
				Stadium: NSC Olimpiyskyi

=== Ukrainian Cup ===
27 October 2021 Round of 16	Mariupol	1–2	Dynamo Kyiv	Mariupol
17:00	Ocheretko 85'	Report	Verbič 16'; Shabanov 33'	Stadium: Volodymyr Boyko Stadium; Attendance: 0 (Note: The FC Mariupol – Dynamo Kyiv match was played without any spectators due to the COVID-19 pandemic in Ukraine and the unprecedented rise in infections in Donetsk oblast enacting the government to declare the region a "red zone" and thus issuing restrictions with gatherings.); Referee: A. A. Kovalenko (Poltava)

2 March 2022 Quarter-finals	Oleksandriya	Cancelled	Dynamo Kyiv	Oleksandriya
17:00				Stadium: CSC Nika Stadium

=== Ukrainian Super Cup ===
22 September 2021 Final	Shakhtar Donetsk	3–0	Dynamo Kyiv	Kyiv
21:00 EEST (UTC+3)	Traoré 30', 54'; Patrick (yellow card) 39', (goal) 61'; Marlon (yellow card) 59'; Kryvtsov (yellow card) 77'; Pedrinho (yellow card) 88'	Report	Buyalskyi (yellow card) 42'; De Pena (yellow card) 43'; Shaparenko (yellow card) 63'; Syrota (yellow card) 71'; Tsyhankov (yellow card) 80'	Stadium: NSC Olimpiyskiy; Attendance: 27,553; Referee: Andryii Kovalenko

=== UEFA Champions League ===
==== Group stage ====
The draw for the group stage was held on 26 August 2021.

Pos	Team	Pld	W	D	L	GF	GA	GD	Pts	Qualification	BAY	BEN	BAR	DKV
1	(Germany) Bayern Munich	6	6	0	0	22	3	+19	18	Advance to knockout phase	—	5–2	3–0	5–0
2	(Portugal) Benfica	6	2	2	2	7	9	−2	8	Advance to knockout phase	0–4	—	3–0	2–0
3	(Spain) Barcelona	6	2	1	3	2	9	−7	7	Transfer to Europa League	0–3	0–0	—	1–0
4	(Ukraine) Dynamo Kyiv	6	0	1	5	1	11	−10	1		1–2	0–0	0–1	—

Source: UEFA
Rules for classification: Group stage tiebreakers

14 September 2021 1	Dynamo Kyiv (Ukraine)	0–0	(Portugal) Benfica	Kyiv, Ukraine
22:00 EEST (UTC+03:00)	Sydorchuk (yellow card) 52'; Zabarnyi (yellow card) 73'; Harmash (yellow card) 82'	Report	Silva (yellow card) 21'; Yaremchuk (yellow card) 44'; Weigl (yellow card) 71'	Stadium: NSC Olimpiyskiy Stadium; Attendance: 21,657; Referee: Anthony Taylor (England)

29 September 2021 2	Bayern Munich (Germany)	5–0	(Ukraine) Dynamo Kyiv	Munich, Germany
21:00 CEST (UTC+2)	Lewandowski 12' (pen.), 27'; Gnabry 68'; Sané 74'; Choupo-Moting 87'; Hernandez (yellow card) 90+1'	Report	Tymchyk (yellow card) 38'	Stadium: Allianz Arena; Attendance: 25,000; Referee: Marco Guida (Italy)

20 October 2021 3	Barcelona (Spain)	1–0	(Ukraine) Dynamo Kyiv	Barcelona, Spain
18:45 CEST (UTC+2)	Piqué 36'; F. de Jong (yellow card) 90'	Report		Stadium: Camp Nou; Attendance: 45,968; Referee: Clément Turpin (France)

2 November 2021 4	Dynamo Kyiv (Ukraine)	0–1	(Spain) Barcelona	Kyiv, Ukraine
22:00 EET (UTC+2)	Harmash (yellow card) 41'; Buyalskyi (yellow card) 45+1'	Report	García (yellow card) 20'; Gavi (yellow card) 46'; Lenglet (yellow card) 50'; Fati 70'	Stadium: NSC Olimpiyskiy Stadium; Attendance: 31,378; Referee: Ovidiu Hațegan (Romania)

23 November 2021 5	Dynamo Kyiv (Ukraine)	1–2	(Germany) Bayern Munich	Kyiv, Ukraine
19:45 EET (UTC+2)	Shaparenko (yellow card) 32'; Harmash 70'	Report	Lewandowski 14'; Coman 42'; Sarr (yellow card) 52'	Stadium: NSC Olimpiyskiy Stadium; Attendance: 28,732; Referee: Halil Umut Meler (Turkey)

8 December 2021 6	Benfica (Portugal)	2–0	(Ukraine) Dynamo Kyiv	Lisbon, Portugal
20:00 WET (UTC±0)	Yaremchuk 16'; Gilberto 22', (yellow card) 24'	Report	Zabarnyi (yellow card) 29'; Verbič (yellow card) 36'; Tsyhankov (yellow card) 44'	Stadium: Estádio da Luz; Referee: Deniz Aytekin (Germany)
