= Vladyslav Vanat =

Ukrainian footballer

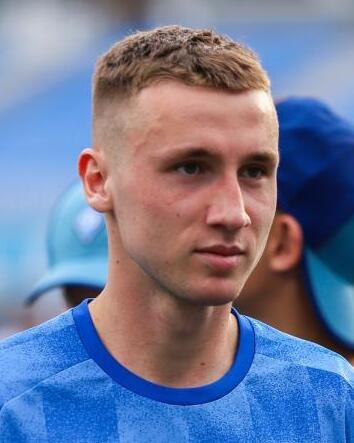
- Vanat in 2024

Personal information
- Full name: Vladyslav Andriyovych Vanat
- Date of birth: 4 January 2002 (age 24)
- Place of birth: Kamianets-Podilskyi, Ukraine
- Height: 1.82 m (6 ft 0 in)
- Position: Striker

Team information
- Current team: Girona
- Number: 19

Youth career
- 2011–2015: DYuSSh-2 Kamianets-Podilskyi
- 2015–2021: Dynamo Kyiv

Senior career*
Years	Team	Apps	(Gls)
2021–2025	Dynamo Kyiv	81	(43)
2021–2022	→ Chornomorets Odesa (loan)	17	(3)
2025–	Girona	34	(14)

International career^{‡}
2017	Ukraine U16	2	(2)
2018–2019	Ukraine U17	5	(2)
2021–2025	Ukraine U21	16	(5)
2023–	Ukraine	20	(2)
Medal record
Men's football
Representing Ukraine
UEFA European Under-21 Championship
Bronze medal – third place	2023 Georgia-Romania
- * Club domestic league appearances and goals as of 24 October 2026 ‡ National team caps and goals as of 6 October 2026

Vladyslav Andriyovych Vanat (Ukrainian: Владисла́в Андрі́йович Вана́т; born 4 January 2002) is a Ukrainian professional footballer who plays as a striker for Segunda División club Girona and the Ukraine national team.

== Club career ==
=== Early career ===
Born in Kamianets-Podilskyi, Vanat is a product of the DYuSSh-2 Kamianets-Podilskyi and Dynamo Kyiv academy systems.

=== Dynamo Kyiv ===
He made his debut in the Ukrainian Premier League for Dynamo on 9 May 2021 against Kolos Kovalivka.

==== Loan to Chornomorets Odesa ====
In July 2021, Vanat moved on loan to Chornomorets Odesa for the 2021-22 season. On 25 July, he made his league debut against Desna Chernihiv at the Chernihiv Stadium. The season was interrupted due to the full-scale invasion of Russia in Ukraine.

=== Girona ===
On 1 September 2025, Vanat signed a five-year contract with La Liga club Girona. On 14 September, he scored a goal on his debut in a 1–1 away draw against Celta.

== International career ==
Vanat was a part of the Ukraine national under-21 football team squad that qualified to the UEFA European Under-21 Championship semi final.

In May 2024, he was on the list of 26 players summoned by Serhiy Rebrov for the UEFA Euro 2024.

== Career statistics ==
=== Club ===
As of match played 24 October 2026

Appearances and goals by club, season and competition
Club	Season	League			National cup (Note: Includes Ukrainian Cup, Copa del Rey)		Europe		Total	
Club	Season	Division	Apps	Goals	Apps	Goals	Apps	Goals	Apps	Goals
Dynamo Kyiv	2020–21	Ukrainian Premier League	1	0	—		—		1	0
Dynamo Kyiv	2022–23	Ukrainian Premier League	25	12	—		11 (Note: Six appearances in UEFA Champions League, five appearances and one goal in UEFA Europa League)	1	36	13
Dynamo Kyiv	2023–24	Ukrainian Premier League	27	14	0	0	3 (Note: Appearances in UEFA Europa Conference League)	0	30	14
Dynamo Kyiv	2024–25	Ukrainian Premier League	28	17	3	1	14 (Note: Six appearances and two goals in UEFA Champions League, six appearances and one goal in UEFA Europa League)	3	45	21
Dynamo Kyiv	Total		81	43	3	1	28	4	112	48
Chornomorets Odesa (loan)	2021–22	Ukrainian Premier League	17	3	1	0	—		18	3
Girona	2025–26	La Liga	27	9	2	1	—		29	10
Girona	2026–27	Segunda División	7	5	0	0	—		7	5
Girona	Total		34	14	2	1	—		36	15
Career total			132	60	6	2	28	4	166	66

=== International ===
As of match played 5 October 2026

Appearances and goals by national team and year
National team	Year	Apps	Goals
Ukraine
Ukraine	2023	5	0
Ukraine	2024	4	1
Ukraine	2025	7	1
Ukraine	2026	4	0
Total		20	2

Scores and results list Ukraine's goal tally first, score column indicates score after each Vanat goal.

List of international goals scored by Vladyslav Vanat
No.	Date	Venue	Opponent	Score	Result	Competition
1	10 September 2024	Fortuna Arena, Prague, Czech Republic	Czech Republic	1–1	2–3	2024–25 UEFA Nations League
2	20 March 2025	Estadio Nueva Condomina, Murcia, Spain	Belgium	2–1	3–1	2024–25 UEFA Nations League play-offs

== Honours ==
Dynamo Kyiv

- Ukrainian Premier League: 2020–21, 2024–25
- Ukrainian Cup: 2020–21

Individual

- Ukrainian Premier League Player of the Month: December 2023/February 2024, March 2024
- Ukrainian Premier League top goalscorers: 2023–24, 2024–25
