= Maksym Braharu =

Ukrainian footballer

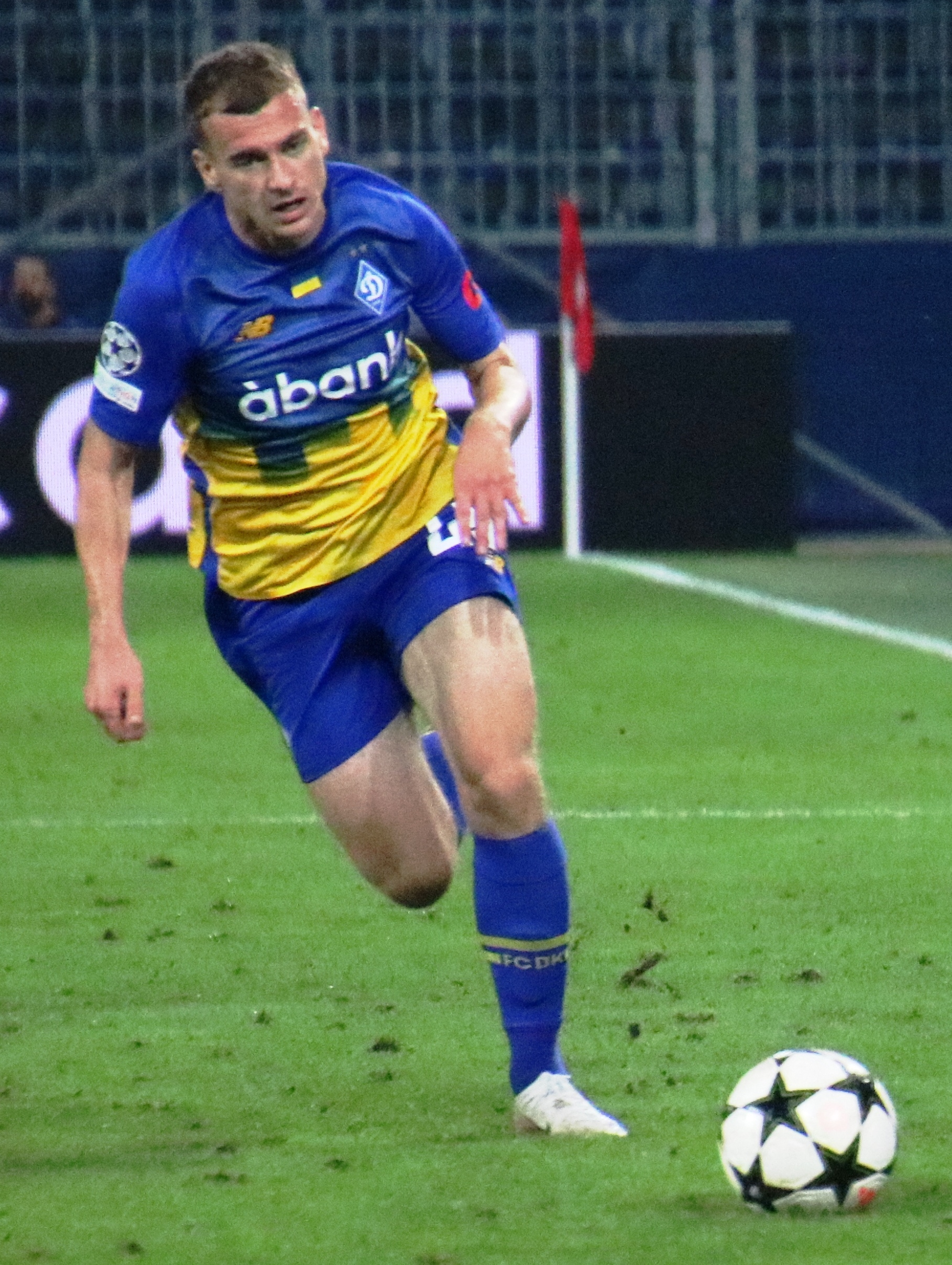

Personal information
- Full name: Maksym Ihorovych Braharu
- Date of birth: 21 July 2002 (age 24)
- Place of birth: Reni, Ukraine
- Height: 1.75 m (5 ft 9 in)
- Position: Winger

Team information
- Current team: Polissya Zhytomyr (on loan from Dynamo Kyiv)
- Number: 45

Youth career
- 2015–2019: Chornomorets Odesa

Senior career*
Years	Team	Apps	(Gls)
2019–2024	Chornomorets Odesa	110	(9)
2019	Chornomorets-2 Odesa	5	(0)
2024–	Dynamo Kyiv	17	(2)
2025–	→ Polissya Zhytomyr (loan)	25	(4)

International career^{‡}
2021–2025	Ukraine U21	33	(4)
2024	Ukraine Olympic	7	(1)
Medal record
Men's football
Representing Ukraine
UEFA European Under-21 Championship
Bronze medal – third place	2023 Georgia-Romania
- * Club domestic league appearances and goals as of 3 June 2026 ‡ National team caps and goals as of 19 June 2025

Maksym Ihorovych Braharu (Ukrainian: Максим Ігорович Брагару, Romanian: Maxim Igorovici Brăgaru; born 21 July 2002) is a Ukrainian professional footballer who plays as a winger for Ukrainian Premier League club Polissya Zhytomyr, on loan from Dynamo Kyiv.

== Club career ==
=== Chornomorets Odesa ===
In July 2019, Braharu joined the structure of Chornomorets Odesa, where he played first in the U-19 youth championship, and then in the Ukrainian youth championship. On August 17, 2019, he made his debut for the first team of the "Sailors" in the 2019/20 Ukrainian First League match against Avangard Kramatorsk, replacing Bohdan Kovalenko in the 89th minute.

=== Dynamo Kyiv ===
On 1 July 2024, Braharu moved to Dynamo Kyiv.

=== Polissya Zhytomyr ===
On 5 September 2025, Braharu joined Polissya Zhytomyr on a season long-loan.

== Honours ==
Dynamo Kyiv

- Ukrainian Premier League: 2024–25
- Ukrainian Cup runner-up: 2024–25

Ukraine Olympic

- Toulon Tournament: 2024
