= Oleksandr Andriyevskyi =

Ukrainian footballer

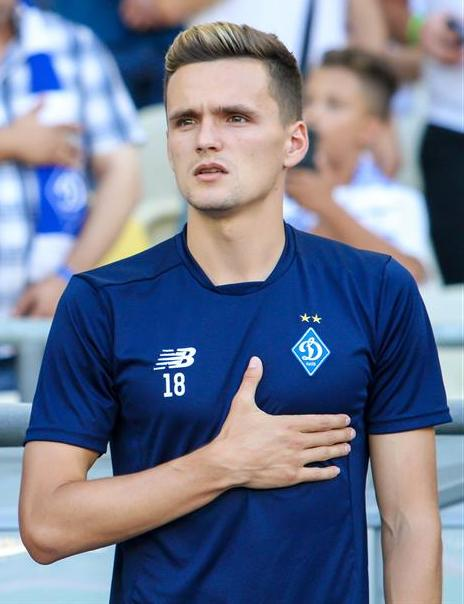

Personal information
- Full name: Oleksandr Petrovych Andriyevskyi
- Date of birth: 25 June 1994 (age 32)
- Place of birth: Kyiv, Ukraine
- Height: 1.80 m (5 ft 11 in)
- Position: Midfielder

Team information
- Current team: Polissya Zhytomyr
- Number: 18

Youth career
- 2007: Dynamo Kyiv
- 2008–2009: Atlet Kyiv
- 2009–2011: Metalist Kharkiv

Senior career*
Years	Team	Apps	(Gls)
2011–2015	Metalist Kharkiv	2	(0)
2014	→ Hirnyk-Sport Komsomolsk (loan)	16	(5)
2015–2024	Dynamo Kyiv	87	(5)
2016–2017	→ Chornomorets Odesa (loan)	24	(3)
2017–2018	→ Zorya Luhansk (loan)	18	(3)
2025–	Polissya Zhytomyr	39	(5)

International career
2011	Ukraine U17	1	(0)
2011–2012	Ukraine U18	6	(1)
2012–2013	Ukraine U19	7	(1)
2014	Ukraine U20	1	(0)
2015	Ukraine U21	3	(0)
2017	Ukraine	1	(0)
- * Club domestic league appearances and goals as of 3 June 2026

Oleksandr Petrovych Andriyevskyi (Ukrainian: Олександр Петрович Андрієвський; born 25 June 1994) is a Ukrainian professional footballer who plays as a midfielder for Polissya Zhytomyr in the Ukrainian Premier League.

== Career ==
=== Club ===
Andriyevskyi is a product of the FC Metalist Kharkiv youth school system. He made his debut for FC Metalist in the match against FC Vorskla Poltava on 10 May 2012 in the Ukrainian Premier League along with another débutante, Oleksandr Azatskyi.

In March 2015, Andriyevskyi joined FC Dynamo Kyiv.

While playing for FC Zorya Luhansk, he made his debut at continental competitions and in October 2017 he was selected as a player of the month in the Ukrainian Premier League.

In December 2020, the club Desna Chernihiv in the city of Chernihiv, showed interest in him.

=== International ===
Andriyevskyi made his Ukraine national team debut on 10 November 2017, when he came on as a substitute in a friendly 2–1 win over Slovakia at Arena Lviv.

== Career statistics ==
=== Club ===
As of the end of 2021–22 season

Club	Season	League			Cup		Continental		Other (Note: Includes Ukrainian Super Cup)		Total	
Club	Season	Division	Apps	Goals	Apps	Goals	Apps	Goals	Apps	Goals	Apps	Goals
Metalist Kharkiv	2011–12	Ukrainian Premier League	1	0	—		—		—		1	0
Metalist Kharkiv	2012–13	Ukrainian Premier League	1	0	—		—		—		1	0
Metalist Kharkiv	Total		2	0	—		—		—		2	0
Hirnyk-Sport Komsomolsk (loan)	2014–15	Ukrainian First League	15	5	1	0	—		—		16	5
Dynamo Kyiv	2014–15	Ukrainian First League	1	0	1	0	—		—		2	0
Dynamo Kyiv	2018–19	Ukrainian First League	12	0	1	0	3 (Note: One appearance in the UEFA Champions League, two appearances in the UEFA Europa League)	0	—		16	0
Dynamo Kyiv	2019–20	Ukrainian First League	7	0	3	0	1 (Note: Appearance(s) in the UEFA Champions League)	0	0	0	11	0
Dynamo Kyiv	2020–21	Ukrainian First League	14	1	1	0	8 (Note: Five appearance in the UEFA Champions League, three appearances in the UEFA Europa League)	0	1	0	24	1
Dynamo Kyiv	2021–22	Ukrainian First League	8	0	0	0	2	0	1	0	11	0
Dynamo Kyiv	Total		42	1	6	0	14	0	2	0	64	1
Chornomorets Odesa (loan)	2016–17	Ukrainian Premier League	24	3	1	0	—		—		25	3
Zorya Luhansk (loan)	2017–18	Ukrainian Premier League	18	3	1	0	6 (Note: Appearance(s) in the UEFA Europa League)	0	—		25	3
Career totals			101	12	9	0	20	0	2	0	132	12

=== International ===
National team	Year	Caps	Goals
Ukraine	2017	1	0
Total		1	0

== Honours ==
Dynamo Kyiv

- Ukrainian Premier League: 2020–21
- Ukrainian Cup: 2020–21

Individual

- Ukrainian Premier League player of the Month: 2017–18 (October)
