= Vitinho (footballer, born April 1999) =

Brazilian footballer

- Vitinho with Dynamo Kyiv in 2021

Personal information
- Full name: Vitor Hugo Naum dos Santos
- Date of birth: 1 April 1999 (age 27)
- Place of birth: São José dos Campos, Brazil
- Height: 1.80 m (5 ft 11 in)
- Position: Forward

Team information
- Current team: SC Internacional (on loan from Dynamo Kyiv)
- Number: 28

Youth career
- –2013: São José-SP
- 2014: Ferroviária
- 2015–2019: Athletico Paranaense

Senior career*
Years	Team	Apps	(Gls)
2018–2021	Athletico Paranaense	64	(12)
2021–	Dynamo Kyiv	8	(3)
2022–2023	→ Athletico Paranaense (loan)	30	(2)
2023–2024	→ Red Bull Bragantino (loan)	79	(6)
2025–	→ Internacional (loan)	55	(13)
- * Club domestic league appearances and goals as of 8 April 2026

Vitor Hugo Naum dos Santos (born 1 April 1999), commonly known as Vitinho, is a Brazilian footballer who plays as a forward for SC Internacional, on loan from Dynamo Kyiv.

== Club career ==
On 31 August 2021, Vitihno signed a 5 year contract with Ukrainian club Dynamo Kyiv.

== Career statistics ==
=== Club ===
As of 1 April 2022.

Club	Season	League			State League		Cup		Continental		Other		Total	
Club	Season	Division	Apps	Goals	Apps	Goals	Apps	Goals	Apps	Goals	Apps	Goals	Apps	Goals
Athletico Paranaense	2018	Série A	0	0	4	0	0	0	—		—		4	0
Athletico Paranaense	2019	Série A	16	2	9	2	4	0	2 (Note: Appearances in Copa Libertadores)	0	0	0	31	4
Athletico Paranaense	2020	Série A	13	4	7	0	0	0	1	0	0	0	21	4
Athletico Paranaense	2021	Série A	12	2	3	2	4	1	9 (Note: Appearances in Copa Sudamericana)	4	—		28	9
Athletico Paranaense	Total		41	8	23	4	8	1	12	4	0	0	84	17
Dynamo Kyiv	2021–22	Ukrainian Premier League	8	3	—		1	0	0	0	1 (Note: Appearances in Ukrainian Super Cup)	0	10	3
Career total			49	11	24	4	8	1	12	4	1	0	94	20

== Honours ==
Athletico Paranaense

- Campeonato Paranaense: 2019, 2020
- J.League Cup / Copa Sudamericana Championship: 2019
- Copa do Brasil: 2019

Internacional

- Campeonato Gaúcho: 2025
- Recopa Gaúcha: 2026
