= 2022–23 FC Dynamo Kyiv season =

Dynamo Kyiv
2022–23 season
- Owner: Ihor Surkis
- President: Ihor Surkis
- Head coach: Mircea Lucescu
- Stadium: NSC Olimpiyskiy
- Premier League: 4th
- Ukrainian Cup: Cancelled
- UEFA Champions League: Play-off round
- UEFA Europa League: Group stage
- Top goalscorer: League: Vitaliy Buyalskyi; Vladyslav Vanat (12 each); All: Vitaliy Buyalskyi; Vladyslav Vanat (13 each)
Home colours	Away colours	Third colours

The 2022–23 season was the 96th season in the history of FC Dynamo Kyiv and their 32nd consecutive season in the top flight. The club participated in the Premier League, the UEFA Champions League and the UEFA Europa League.

== Players ==
=== Squad ===
As of 25 January 2023

Note: Flags indicate national team as defined under FIFA eligibility rules; some limited exceptions apply. Players may hold more than one non-FIFA nationality.

No.	Pos.	Nation	Player
1	GK	UKR	Heorhiy Bushchan
2	DF	UKR	Kostyantyn Vivcharenko
3	DF	UKR	Anton Bol
4	DF	UKR	Denys Popov
5	MF	UKR	Serhiy Sydorchuk (captain)
7	MF	UKR	Vladyslav Kabayev
8	MF	UKR	Volodymyr Shepelyev
9	MF	JAM	Kaheem Parris
10	MF	UKR	Mykola Shaparenko
11	FW	UKR	Vladyslav Vanat
14	MF	UKR	Oleksandr Yatsyk
15	FW	VEN	Eric Ramírez
17	FW	UKR	Vladyslav Supryaha
18	MF	UKR	Oleksandr Andriyevskyi
19	MF	UKR	Denys Harmash
20	DF	UKR	Oleksandr Karavayev

No.	Pos.	Nation	Player
21	DF	UKR	Volodymyr Kostevych
22	MF	NED	Justin Lonwijk
24	DF	UKR	Oleksandr Tymchyk
25	DF	UKR	Maksym Dyachuk
29	MF	UKR	Vitaliy Buyalskyi (vice-captain)
30	MF	SEN	Samba Diallo
34	DF	UKR	Oleksandr Syrota
35	GK	UKR	Ruslan Neshcheret
37	MF	UKR	Anton Tsarenko
44	DF	UKR	Vladyslav Dubinchak
70	MF	UKR	Bohdan Lyednyev
71	GK	UKR	Denys Boyko
75	GK	UKR	Yuriy Avramenko
77	MF	NGR	Benito
91	MF	UKR	Nazar Voloshyn
92	MF	MKD	Reshat Ramadani

=== Also under contract ===
Note: Flags indicate national team as defined under FIFA eligibility rules; some limited exceptions apply. Players may hold more than one non-FIFA nationality.

No.	Pos.	Nation	Player
—	DF	UKR	Volodymyr Kostevych
—	MF	GHA	Mohammed Kadiri
—	FW	UKR	Oleh Vlasov

=== Out on loan ===
Note: Flags indicate national team as defined under FIFA eligibility rules; some limited exceptions apply. Players may hold more than one non-FIFA nationality.

No.	Pos.	Nation	Player
—	DF	POL	Tomasz Kędziora (at PAOK until 30 June 2023)
—	DF	UKR	Akhmed Alibekov (at Zorya Luhansk until 30 June 2023)
—	DF	UKR	Kristian Bilovar (at (Cyprus) AEL Limassol until 30 June 2023)
—	DF	UKR	Mykyta Burda (at Zorya Luhansk until 30 June 2023)
—	DF	UKR	Maksym Dyachuk (at Oleksandriya until 30 June 2023)
—	DF	UKR	Vasyl Tanchak (at Lviv until 30 June 2023)
—	MF	UKR	Bohdan Biloshevskyi (at Oleksandriya until 30 June 2023)
—	MF	UKR	Viktor Bliznichenko (at Inhulets Petrove until 30 June 2023)
—	MF	UKR	Volodymyr Brazhko (at Zorya Luhansk until 30 June 2024)
—	MF	UKR	Serhiy Buletsa (at Zorya Luhansk until 30 June 2023)
—	MF	DEN	Mikkel Duelund (at (Netherlands) NEC Nijmegen until 30 June 2023)
—	MF	UKR	Mykyta Kravchenko (at Kolos Kovalivka until 30 June 2023)
—	DF	UKR	Denys Kuzyk (at Lviv until 30 June 2023)

No.	Pos.	Nation	Player
—	MF	UKR	Mykola Mykhaylenko (at Oleksandriya until 30 June 2023)
—	MF	UKR	Roman Mykhayliv (at Lviv until 30 June 2023)
—	MF	UKR	Illya Skrypnyk (at Bukovyna Chernivtsi until 30 June 2023)
—	MF	UKR	Yevheniy Smyrnyi (at Kolos Kovalivka until 30 June 2023)
—	MF	GEO	Heorhiy Tsitaishvili (at (Poland) Lech Poznań until 30 June 2023)
—	MF	UKR	Nazar Voloshyn (at Kryvbas Kryvyi Rih until 30 June 2023)
—	MF	UKR	Vikentiy Voloshyn (at Oleksandriya until 30 June 2023)
—	FW	UKR	Artem Besedin (at AC Omonia until 30 June 2023)
—	FW	UKR	Kiril Popov (at Kolos Kovalivka until 30 June 2023)
—	FW	UKR	Yevhen Isayenko (at Kolos Kovalivka until 31 December 2023)
—	FW	LUX	Gerson Rodrigues (at (Saudi Arabia) Al Wehda until 30 June 2023)
—	FW	ESP	Fran Sol (at (Spain) Málaga until 30 June 2023)
—	FW	BRA	Vitinho (at (Brazil) Athletico Paranaense until 30 June 2023)

== Transfers ==
=== In ===
Date	Position	Nationality	Name	From	Fee	Ref.
31 August 2022	MF	(Ukraine)	Vladyslav Kabayev	Zorya Luhansk	Undisclosed	
2 September 2022	FW	(Jamaica)	Kaheem Parris	Koper	Undisclosed	
22 September 2022	MF	(Netherlands)	Justin Lonwijk	Viborg	Undisclosed	

=== Out ===
Date	Position	Nationality	Name	To	Fee	Ref.
29 July 2022	MF	(Slovenia)	Benjamin Verbič	Panathinaikos	Undisclosed	
6 August 2022	DF	(Brazil)	Sidcley	Cuiabá	Undisclosed	
9 August 2022	GK	(Ukraine)	Nazariy Rusyn	Zorya Luhansk	Undisclosed	
1 September 2022	MF	(Ukraine)	Denys Antyukh	Zorya Luhansk	Undisclosed	
1 September 2022	DF	(Ukraine)	Roman Vantukh	Zorya Luhansk	Undisclosed	
5 January 2023	FW	(Belgium)	Ibrahim Kargbo Jr.	Celje	Undisclosed	
17 January 2023	MF	(Ukraine)	Viktor Tsyhankov	Girona	€5,000,000	
25 January 2023	FW	(Ukraine)	Vladyslav Kulach	Zira	Undisclosed	
31 January 2023	DF	(Ukraine)	Illya Zabarnyi	Bournemouth	Undisclosed	

=== Loans out ===
Date from	Position	Nationality	Name	To	Date to	Ref.
1 July 2021	MF	(Ukraine)	Akhmed Alibekov	Zorya Luhansk	30 June 2023	
1 July 2021	MF	(Ukraine)	Serhiy Buletsa	Zorya Luhansk	30 June 2023	
10 January 2022	DF	(Ukraine)	Bohdan Biloshevskyi	Oleksandriya	30 June 2023	
21 January 2022	MF	(Ukraine)	Bohdan Lyednyev	Fehérvár	31 December 2022	
4 February 2022	FW	(Ukraine)	Yevhen Isayenko	Kolos Kovalivka	30 June 2023	
4 February 2022	DF	(Ukraine)	Denys Kuzyk	Kolos Kovalivka	31 December 2022	
1 April 2022	FW	(Brazil)	Vitinho	Athletico Paranaense	31 December 2022	
1 July 2022	DF	(Ukraine)	Roman Vantukh	Dnipro-1	18 July 2022	
1 July 2022	MF	(Georgia (country))	Heorhiy Tsitaishvili	Lech Poznań	30 June 2023	
1 July 2022	MF	(Luxembourg)	Gerson Rodrigues	Al Wehda	30 June 2023	
1 July 2022	MF	(Ukraine)	Roman Mykhayliv	Lviv	31 December 2022	
1 July 2022	FW	(Ecuador)	Eric Ramírez	Slovan Bratislava	30 June 2023	
1 July 2022	FW	(Ukraine)	Kiril Popov	Kolos Kovalivka	30 June 2023	
6 July 2022	FW	(Spain)	Fran Sol	Málaga	30 June 2023	
8 July 2022	MF	(Ukraine)	Yevheniy Smyrnyi	Kolos Kovalivka	30 June 2023	
11 July 2022	DF	(Ukraine)	Maksym Dyachuk	Oleksandriya	30 June 2024	
15 July 2022	MF	(Ukraine)	Viktor Bliznichenko	Inhulets Petrove	30 June 2023	
17 July 2022	MF	(Ukraine)	Nazar Voloshyn	Kryvbas Kryvyi Rih	30 June 2023	
18 July 2022	DF	(Ukraine)	Roman Vantukh	Zorya Luhansk	1 September 2022	
18 July 2022	MF	(Ukraine)	Volodymyr Brazhko	Zorya Luhansk	30 June 2024	
18 July 2022	MF	(Ukraine)	Mykola Mykhaylenko	Zorya Luhansk	9 January 2023	
18 July 2022	MF	(Ukraine)	Vikentiy Voloshyn	Oleksandriya	30 June 2023	
7 August 2022	FW	(Belgium)	Ibrahim Kargbo Jr.	Doxa Katokopias	5 January 2023	
15 August 2022	MF	(Ukraine)	Vadym Mashchenko	Jonava	31 December 2022	
23 August 2022	MF	(Ukraine)	Illya Skrypnyk	Bukovyna Chernivtsi	30 June 2023	
31 August 2022	DF	(Ukraine)	Kristian Bilovar	AEL Limassol	30 June 2023	
9 January 2023	MF	(Ukraine)	Mykola Mykhaylenko	Oleksandriya	30 June 2023	
29 January 2023	DF	(Poland)	Tomasz Kędziora	PAOK	30 June 2023	
29 January 2023	MF	(Denmark)	Mikkel Duelund	AGF	30 June 2023	
31 January 2023	FW	(Ukraine)	Artem Biesiedin	AC Omonia	30 June 2023	
6 February 2023	DF	(Ukraine)	Denys Kuzyk	Kolos Kovalivka	31 December 2023	
17 February 2023	DF	(Ukraine)	Mykyta Kravchenko	Kolos Kovalivka	31 December 2023	
1 March 2023	DF	(Ukraine)	Mykyta Burda	Zorya Luhansk	30 June 2023	

=== Contract suspensions ===
Date	Position	Nationality	Name	Joined	Date	Ref.
6 August 2022	MF	(Denmark)	Mikkel Duelund	NEC Nijmegen	29 January 2023	

=== Released ===
Date	Position	Nationality	Name	Joined	Date	Ref.
15 October 2022	GK	(Ukraine)	Vladyslav Kucheruk	Zorya Luhansk	10 January 2023	

== Pre-season and friendlies ==
Win Draw Loss Fixtures

26 June 2022 Global Tour for Peace	Yverdon (Switzerland)	1–1	(Ukraine) Dynamo Kyiv	Yverdon-les-Bains, Switzerland
16:00 CEST (UTC+2)				Stadium: Stade Municipal; Attendance: 800

2 July 2022 Global Tour for Peace	Sion (Switzerland)	0–1	(Ukraine) Dynamo Kyiv	Savièse, Switzerland
18:00 CEST (UTC+2)			Vanat 35'	Stadium: Stade St-Germain; Attendance: 800

5 July 2022 Global Tour for Peace	Young Boys (Switzerland)	0–0	(Ukraine) Dynamo Kyiv	Bern, Switzerland
20:00 CEST (UTC+2)				Stadium: Stadion Wankdorf

9 July 2022 Global Tour for Peace	Luzern (Switzerland)	1–2	(Ukraine) Dynamo Kyiv	Lucerne, Switzerland
18:00 CEST (UTC+2)	Emini 81'		Tsyhankov 16' (pen.); Verbič 24'	Stadium: Swissporarena

12 July 2022 Global Tour for Peace	Lyon (France)	1–3	(Ukraine) Dynamo Kyiv	Rennes, France
18:00 CEST (UTC+2)	El Arouch 59'		Vanat (penalty missed) 19'; Antiukh 25'; Supryaha 56'; Voloshyn 84'	Stadium: Roazhon Park

12 July 2022 Global Tour for Peace	Lyon (France)	3–0	(Ukraine) Dynamo Kyiv	Rennes, France
21:00 CEST (UTC+2)	Lukeba 52'; Boueye 73'; Lega 76'		Sydorchuk (yellow card) 15'	Stadium: Roazhon Park

15 July 2022 Global Tour for Peace	Antwerp (Belgium)	2–1	(Ukraine) Dynamo Kyiv	Antwerp, Belgium
20:00 CEST (UTC+2)	Janssen 7'; Benson 70'		Tsyhankov 40'	Stadium: Bosuilstadion

== Competitions ==
=== Overall record ===
Competition	First match	Last match	Starting round	Final position	Record							
Competition	First match	Last match	Starting round	Final position	Pld	W	D	L	GF	GA	GD	Win %
Premier League	28 August 2022		Matchday 1		21	12	4	5	30	17	+13	57.14
UEFA Champions League	20 July 2022	23 August 2022	Second qualifying round	Play-off round	6	3	1	2	5	7	−2	50.00
UEFA Europa League	8 September 2022	3 November 2022	Group stage	Group stage	6	0	1	5	5	11	−6	0.00
Total					33	15	6	12	40	35	+5	45.45

Last updated: 14 April 2023
Source: Soccerway

=== Premier League ===
==== League table ====
Pos	Team	Pld	W	D	L	GF	GA	GD	Pts	Qualification or relegation
2	Dnipro-1	30	21	4	5	61	27	+34	67	Qualification for the Champions League second qualifying round
3	Zorya Luhansk	30	20	4	6	61	34	+27	64	Qualification for the Europa League play-off round
4	Dynamo Kyiv	30	18	6	6	51	25	+26	60	Qualification for the Europa Conference League third qualifying round
5	Vorskla Poltava	30	13	6	11	38	37	+1	45	Qualification for the Europa Conference League second qualifying round
6	Oleksandriya	30	10	14	6	42	39	+3	44	

Source: upl.ua
Rules for classification: 1) Points; 2) Head-to-head points; 3) Head-to-head goal difference; 4) Head-to-head goals scored; 5) Goal difference; 6) Goals scored; 7) Draw or "Golden match" if two teams tied for title (Article 22, paragraph 3).

Teams that placed 13th and 14th in the 2022–23 Ukrainian Premier League play two-leg play-off with the third and fourth teams of the 2022–23 Ukrainian First League. The draw for play-offs took place on 2 June 2023 and the games will be played on 10 and 14 June 2023. If players of the clubs would be called to the national teams, games will be moved to June 8 and 12.

Team 1	Agg.	Team 2	1st leg	2nd leg
Inhulets Petrove	2–3	LNZ Cherkasy	1–1	1–2
Metalurh Zaporizhzhia	2–6	Veres Rivne	1–0	1–6

=== First leg ===
10 June 2023
17:40 UTC+3 (Note: Kick off time was delayed for 40 minutes due to air alert.)

Inhulets Petrove	1 – 1	LNZ Cherkasy
Klymenko 46'	Report	Tyshchenko 57' (pen.)

Inhulets Stadium, Petrove
Attendance: 0
Referee: Vitaliy Romanov (Dnipro)

10 June 2023
17:00 UTC+3

Metalurh Zaporizhzhia	1 – 0	Veres Rivne
Sad 29'	Report	Vovchenko (red card) 5'

Ukraina Stadium, Lviv
Attendance: 0
Referee: Yuriy Ivanov (Donetsk Oblast)

=== Second leg ===
14 June 2023
15:00 UTC+3

LNZ Cherkasy	2 – 1	Inhulets Petrove
Savin 17'; Korobenko 30' (o.g.); Tyshchenko (red card) 90+1'	Report	Sitalo 51'

Cherkasy Arena, Cherkasy
Attendance: 0
Referee: Maksym Kozyryatskyi (Zaporizhia)

LNZ Cherkasy won 3–2 on aggregate and were promoted to the UPL; Inhulets were relegated to the First League

14 June 2023
13:00 UTC+3

Veres Rivne	6 – 1	Metalurh Zaporizhzhia
Krapyvnyi 16' (o.g.); Balan 23', 66'; Hahun 29'; Pasich 82'; Hayduchyk 89'	Report	Sokol (red card) 37'; Mohylnyi 90+1'

Avanhard Stadium, Rivne
Attendance: 0
Referee: Dmytro Bondarenko (Odesa)

Veres Rivne won 6–2 on aggregrate and both teams remained in their respective divisions

==== Results summary ====
Overall								Home						Away					
Pld	W	D	L	GF	GA	GD	Pts	W	D	L	GF	GA	GD	W	D	L	GF	GA	GD
30	18	6	6	51	25	+26	60	7	4	4	22	13	+9	11	2	2	29	12	+17

Last updated: 14 April 2023.
Source: VBet Liha

==== Results by round ====
Round	1	2	3	4	5	6	7	8	9	10	11	12	13	14	15	16	17	18	19	20	21	22	23	24	25	26	27	28	29	30
Ground	H	A	H	A	H	A	H	H	A	H	H	A	A	H	H	H	A	H	A	H	A	H	A	A	A	H	A	A	H	A
Result	L	L	W	W	W	L	D	W	W	W	D	W	W	D	W	L	W	L	W	W	D	D	W	W	W	L	W	W	W	D
Position	16	16	11	9	8	8	8	8	6	5	5	3	3	3	3	4	4	4	4	4	4	4	4	4	4	4	4	4	4	4

Updated to match(es) played on 14 April 2023. Source: VBet Liha
A = Away; H = Home; W = Win; D = Draw; L = Loss

==== Matches ====
28 August 2022 2	Dynamo Kyiv	0–3	Dnipro-1	Lviv
17:00 EEST (UTC+3)	Shepelev (yellow card) 29'; Karavayev (yellow card) 35'; Bushchan (yellow card) 42'; Sydorchuk (yellow card) 68'	Report	Svatok (yellow card) 26'; Sarapiy 43'; Busanello (yellow card) 45+2'; Pikhalyonok 55'; Nazarenko (yellow card) 86'; Rubchynskyi 90+1'	Stadium: Arena Lviv; Attendance: 0 Referee: Andriy Kovalenko
Note: Match played behind closed doors.

3 September 2022 3	Zorya Luhansk	3–2	Dynamo Kyiv	Kyiv
13:00 EEST (UTC+3)	Rusyn 7' (yellow card) 31'; Myshnyov 35'; Vantukh (yellow card) 58' (yellow-red card) 68'; Brazhko 70'; Nazaryna (yellow card) 79'; Alefirenko (yellow card) 81'	Report	Syrota (yellow card) 22'; Zabarnyi (yellow card) 42'; Vanat 50' (yellow card) 51'; Karavayev (yellow card) 55'; Shaparenko (yellow card) 75'; Buyalskyi 83' (yellow card) 86'	Stadium: NSC Olimpiyskiy; Attendance: 0 Referee: Ihor Paskhal
Note: Match played behind closed doors.

11 September 2022 4	Dynamo Kyiv	1–0	Lviv	Lviv
17:00 EEST (UTC+3)	Buyalskyi 32'; Vanat (yellow card) 86'	Report	Vasylyev (yellow card) 21'; Busko (yellow card) 25'; Vovkun (yellow card) 47'; Hrysyo (yellow card) 81'	Stadium: Arena Lviv; Attendance: 0 Referee: Oleksandr Omelchenko
Note: Match played behind closed doors.

2 October 2022 5	Mynai	0–1	Dynamo Kyiv	Mynai
13:00 EEST (UTC+3)	Horin (yellow card) 7'; Kolesnyk (yellow card) 85'; Nyemchaninov (yellow card) 87'; Baydal (yellow card) 90+2'	Report	Tsyhankov 51'; Shepelyev (yellow card) 56'; Popov (yellow card) 90+3'	Stadium: Mynai Arena; Attendance: 0 Referee: Oleksandr Shandor
Note: Match played behind closed doors.

9 October 2022 6	Dynamo Kyiv	3–0	Rukh Lviv	Lviv
17:00 EEST (UTC+3)	Buyalskyi 43', 60'; Tymchyk (yellow card) 56' (goal) 81'	Report	Roman (yellow card) 14'; Dovhyi (yellow card) 37'	Stadium: Arena Lviv; Attendance: 0 Referee: Ihor Paskhal
Note: Match played behind closed doors.

16 October 2022 7	Shakhtar Donetsk	3–1	Dynamo Kyiv	Lviv
17:00 EEST (UTC+3)	Mykhaylichenko (yellow card) 10'; Zubkov 29'; Traoré (penalty missed) 45'; Mudryk 47'; Konoplya (yellow card) 56'; Sikan (yellow card) 63' (goal) 74'; Stepanenko (yellow card) 71'; Petryak (yellow card) 88'	Report	Vivcharenko (yellow card) 6'; Vanat (yellow card) 14' (goal) 46'; Zabarnyi (red card) 69'	Stadium: Arena Lviv; Attendance: 0 Referee: Kateryna Monzul
Note: Match played behind closed doors.

23 October 2022 9	Dynamo Kyiv	1–1	Vorskla Poltava	Kyiv
13:00 EEST (UTC+3)	Karavayev (yellow card) 21'; Buyalskyi 33'	Report	Sklyar (yellow card) 16'; Yurchenko 44'; Marlyson (yellow card) 90+3'	Stadium: Valeriy Lobanovskyi Dynamo Stadium; Attendance: 0 Referee: Maksym Kozyriatskyi
Note: Match played behind closed doors.

30 October 2022 10	Dynamo Kyiv	3–1	Kryvbas Kryvyi Rih	Lviv
17:00 EET (UTC+2)	Vanat 20'; Buyalskyi 22', 59'; Tymchyk (yellow card) 38'; Harmash (yellow card) 43'; Tsyhankov (penalty missed) 58'; Sydorchuk (yellow card) 88'; Vivcharenko (yellow card) 90+1'	Report	Debelko 45+2'; Dibango (yellow card) 58'	Stadium: Arena Lviv; Referee: Mykola Balakin

6 November 2022 11	Chornomorets Odesa	0–3	Dynamo Kyiv	Odesa
15:00 EET (UTC+2)	James (yellow card) 30'; Kravchenko (yellow card) 34'; Bilyi (yellow card) 87'	Report	Lonwijk (yellow card) 20'; Tsyhankov 25' (pen.); Buyalskyi 48'; Sydorchuk (yellow card) 53'; Vanat 90' (pen.)	Stadium: Chornomorets Stadium; Referee: Andrii Kovalenko

10 November 2022 12	Dynamo Kyiv	3–1	Oleksandriya	Kyiv
15:00 EET (UTC+2)	Buyalskyi 10'; Dubinchak (yellow card) 32'; Tsyhankov (yellow card) 70'; Vanat (yellow card) 71'; Lonwijk 73'; Shepelyev 88'	Report	Tsurikov (yellow card) 29'; Kozhushko (yellow card) 76'; Shulyanskyi 90+1'	Stadium: Valeriy Lobanovskyi Dynamo Stadium; Referee: Dmytro Panchyshyn

13 November 2022 13	Dynamo Kyiv	0–0	Kolos Kovalivka	Kyiv
15:00 EET (UTC+2)	Popov (yellow card) 25' (yellow-red card) 68'; Kabayev (yellow card) 48'; Syrota (yellow card) 90+4'; Sydorchuk (yellow card) 90+5'	Report	Orikhovskyi (yellow card) 14'; Ilyin (yellow card) 26'; Milko (yellow card) 62'; Bolbat (yellow card) 83'; Bohdanov (yellow card) 90+5'	Stadium: Valeriy Lobanovskyi Dynamo Stadium; Referee: Ihor Paskhal

17 November 2022 1	Inhulets Petrove	1–2	Dynamo Kyiv	Kyiv
13:00 EET (UTC+2)	Kozak (yellow card) 13'; Kovalyov (yellow card) 15'; Korobenko (yellow card) 31'; Sitalo 62'	Report	Tsyhankov 32', 45+1'; Syrota (yellow card) 71'	Stadium: Valeriy Lobanovskyi Dynamo Stadium; Referee: Kateryna Monzul
Note: Match originally scheduled for 23 August 2022.

21 November 2022 14	Veres Rivne	0–1	Dynamo Kyiv	Kyiv
14:00 EET (UTC+2)		Report	Tsyhankov 27'; Dubinchak (yellow card) 69'	Stadium: Valeriy Lobanovskyi Dynamo Stadium; Referee: Yaroslav Kozyk

26 November 2022 15	Dynamo Kyiv	0–0	Metalist 1925 Kharkiv	Kyiv
14:00 EET (UTC+2)	Tsyhankov (penalty missed) 44'; Karavayev (yellow card) 54'; Besedin (yellow card) 90+1'; Buyalskyi (yellow card) 90+3'	Report	Tkachuk (yellow card) 24'; Kurylo (yellow card) 33'; Kapinus (yellow card) 71'	Stadium: Valeriy Lobanovskyi Dynamo Stadium; Referee: Maksym Kozyriatskyi

30 November 2022 8	Dynamo Kyiv	3–0	Metalist Kharkiv	Kyiv
14:00 EET (UTC+2)	Buyalskyi 20'; Vanat 29'; Sydorchuk (yellow card) 42'; Tsyhankov 77'	Report	Tankovskyi (yellow card) 19'; Demchenko (yellow card) 80'	Stadium: Valeriy Lobanovskyi Dynamo Stadium; Referee: Oleksandr Shandor
Note: Match originally scheduled for 19 October 2022.

4 March 2022 16	Dynamo Kyiv	0–2	Inhulets Petrove	Kyiv
14:00 EET (UTC+2)	Lonwijk (yellow card) 90+1'	Report	Kozak 12'; Odaryuk 43'; Smolyakov (yellow card) 73'	Stadium: Valeriy Lobanovskyi Dynamo Stadium; Referee: Kateryna Monzul

12 March 2022 17	Dnipro-1	0–1	Dynamo Kyiv	Uzhhorod
13:00 EET (UTC+2)	Babenko (yellow card) 21'; Blanco (yellow card) 83'	Report	Popov (yellow card) 32'; Buyalskyi 41' (red card) 90+9'; Benito (yellow card) 53'; Lonwijk (yellow card) 70'; Karavayev (yellow card) 86'	Stadium: Avanhard Stadium; Referee: Dmytro Kryvushkin

18 March 2023 18	Dynamo Kyiv	0–1	Zorya Luhansk	Kyiv
14:00 EET (UTC+2)	Tymchyk (yellow card) 31'; Sydorchuk (yellow card) 78'	Report	Rusyn (yellow card) 9'; Antyukh (yellow card) 30'; Guerrero (yellow card) 40' (goal) 83'; Batahov (yellow card) 70'; Butko (yellow card) 76'	Stadium: Valeriy Lobanovskyi Dynamo Stadium; Referee: Yaroslav Kozyk

2 April 2023 19	Lviv	0–2	Dynamo Kyiv	Lviv
13:00 EEST (UTC+3)	Bohunov (yellow card) 51'; Eseola (yellow card) 73'	Report	Dubinchak (yellow card) 50'; Vanat 52'; Shepelyev (yellow card) 72'; Ramírez 87'	Stadium: Arena Lviv; Referee: Ihor Paskhal

8 April 2023 20	Dynamo Kyiv	2–0	Mynai	Kyiv
13:00 EEST (UTC+3)	Tsarenko 35'; Vanat 62'; Yatsyk (yellow card) 83'	Report	Horin (yellow card) 58'	Stadium: Valeriy Lobanovskyi Dynamo Stadium; Referee: Maksym Kozyriatskyi

14 April 2023 21	Rukh Lviv	1–1	Dynamo Kyiv	Lviv
15:00 EEST (UTC+3)	Dovhyi 41' (yellow card) 45+1'; Klymchuk (yellow card) 63'; Prytula (yellow card) 81'	Report	Popov (yellow card) 13'; Vanat 16'; Dyachuk (yellow card) 20'; Andriyevskyi (yellow card) 65'	Stadium: Arena Lviv; Referee: Anastasia Romaniuk

22 April 2023 22	Dynamo Kyiv	1–1	Shakhtar Donetsk	Kyiv
17:00 EEST (UTC+3)	Andriyevskyi 82'; Benito (yellow card) 89'	Report	Stepanenko 12'; Đurasek (yellow card) 27'; Rakitskyi (yellow card) 38'; Bondarenko (yellow card) 55'; Nazaryna (yellow card) 86'; Mykhaylichenko (yellow card) 87'	Stadium: Valeriy Lobanovskyi Dynamo Stadium; Referee: Vitalii Romanov

28 April 2023 23	Metalist Kharkiv	1–3	Dynamo Kyiv	Uzhhorod
13:00 EEST (UTC+3)	Pryadun (yellow card) 34' (goal) 81'; Corral (yellow card) 45+2'; Romanyuk (red card) 48'; Demchenko (yellow card) 86'	Report	Vivcharenko (yellow card) 47' (goal) 90+1'; Syrota 70'; Vanat 75'; Ramírez (yellow card) 82'	Stadium: Avanhard Stadium; Referee: Ihor Paskhal

4 May 2023 24	Vorskla Poltava	1–2	Dynamo Kyiv	Poltava
15:00 EEST (UTC+3)	Stepanyuk 13'; Chelyadin (yellow card) 26'; Batsula (yellow card) 84'	Report	Vanat (yellow card) 7', (goal) 24'; Benito 48'; Dyachuk (yellow card) 79'	Stadium: Butovsky Vorskla Stadium; Referee: Oleksandr Shandor

8 May 2023 25	Kryvbas Kryvyi Rih	0–1	Dynamo Kyiv	Kryvyi Rih
13:00 EEST (UTC+3)	Khomchenovskyi (yellow card) 28'; Debelko (yellow card) 80'	Report	Andriyevskyi (yellow card) 45+1'; Popov 48', (yellow card) 90+2'; Tymchyk (yellow card) 65'; Parris (yellow card) 74'; Sydorchuk (yellow card) 90+4'	Stadium: Hirnyk Stadium; Referee: Yaroslav Kozyk

13 May 2023 26	Dynamo Kyiv	2–3	Chornomorets Odesa	Kyiv
14:00 EEST (UTC+3)	Benito (yellow card) 22'; Vanat 53'; Buyalskyi 55'; Dyachuk (yellow card) 56'; Dubinchak (yellow card) 72'	Report	Yermakov 4'; Demchenko 11', 71'; Salyuk (yellow card) 76'	Stadium: Valeriy Lobanovskyi Dynamo Stadium; Referee: Vitaliy Romanov

20 May 2023 27	Oleksandriya	1–5	Dynamo Kyiv	Oleksandriia
15:00 EEST (UTC+3)	Siheyev 40'; Kulakov (yellow card) 84'	Report	Andriyevskyi 17'; Vanat 32'; Kabayev (yellow card) 54'; Vivcharenko 73'; Lohinov 77' (o.g.); Voloshyn 88'	Stadium: CSC Nika; Referee: Dmytro Kryvushkin

24 May 2023 28	Kolos Kovalivka	0–3	Dynamo Kyiv	Kovalivka
13:00 EEST (UTC+3)	Orikhovskyi (yellow card) 87'	Report	Volynets 9' (o.g.); Parris (yellow card) 27'; Andriyevskyi 67'; Vivcharenko (yellow card) 90'; Buyalskyi (yellow card) 90+2'; Voloshyn 90+3'	Stadium: Kolos Stadium; Referee: Igor Paskhal

29 May 2023 29	Dynamo Kyiv	3–0	Veres Rivne	Rivne
15:00 EEST (UTC+3)	Sydorchuk (yellow card) 26'; Dyachuk (yellow card) 38'; Ramírez 49'; Shaparenko (yellow card) 83'; Harmash 89'; Voloshyn 90+3'	Report	Shestakov (penalty missed) 87'	Stadium: Avanhard Stadium; Referee: Denys Shurman

4 June 2023 30	Metalist 1925 Kharkiv	1–1	Dynamo Kyiv	Kyiv
15:00 EEST (UTC+3)	Habelok 39', (yellow card) 53' (yellow-red card) 89'; Tkachuk (yellow card) 57'; Kovalenko (yellow card) 68'; Mozil (yellow card) 90+2'	Report	Ramírez 20' (pen.); Dyachuk (red card) 32'; Bol (yellow card) 83'	Stadium: Bannikov Stadium; Referee: Maksim Kozyryatskiy

=== UEFA Champions League ===
==== Second qualifying round ====
The draw for the third qualifying round was held on 15 June 2022.

20 July 2022 First leg	Dynamo Kyiv (Ukraine)	0–0	(Turkey) Fenerbahçe	Łódź, Poland
20:00 CEST (UTC+2)	Sydorchuk (yellow card) 58'; Besedin (yellow card) 73'; Harmash (yellow card) 90+1'	Report	King (yellow card) 31'; Dursun (yellow card) 87'	Stadium: Stadion Miejski im. Władysława Króla; Attendance: 11,603; Referee: Glenn Nyberg (Sweden)

27 July 2022 Second leg	Fenerbahçe (Turkey)	1–2 (a.e.t.) (1–2 agg.)	(Ukraine) Dynamo Kyiv	Istanbul, Turkey
20:00 TRT (UTC+3)	Yüksek (yellow card) 29' (yellow-red card) 53'; Osayi-Samuel (yellow card) 37'; Valencia (yellow card) 45+2', (penalty missed) 70'; Szalai 89', (yellow card) 98'	Report	Tsyhankov (yellow card) 13'; Sydorchuk (yellow card) 33'; Dubinchak (yellow card) 45+2'; Buyalskyi 57', (yellow card) 58'; Shaparenko (yellow card) 60'; Popov (yellow card) 68'; Harmash (yellow card) 111'; Karavayev 114'	Stadium: Şükrü Saracoğlu Stadium; Attendance: 40,000; Referee: Massimiliano Irrati (Italy)

==== Third qualifying round ====
The draw for the third qualifying round was held on 18 July 2022.

3 August 2022 First leg	Dynamo Kyiv (Ukraine)	1–0	(Austria) Sturm Graz	Łódź, Poland
20:00 CEST (UTC+2)	Karavayev 28'	Report		Stadium: Stadion Miejski im. Władysława Króla; Attendance: 6,092; Referee: François Letexier (France)

9 August 2022 Second leg	Sturm Graz (Austria)	1–2 (a.e.t.) (1–3 agg.)	(Ukraine) Dynamo Kyiv	Graz, Austria
20:30 CEST (UTC+2)	Højlund 27'	Report	Vivcharenko 97'; Tsyhankov 112'	Stadium: Liebenauer Stadium; Attendance: 14,007; Referee: Ivan Kružliak (Slovakia)

==== Play-off round ====
The draw for the play-off round was held on 2 August 2022.

17 August 2022 First leg	Dynamo Kyiv (Ukraine)	0–2	(Portugal) Benfica	Łódź, Poland
21:00 CEST (UTC+02:00)	Andriyevskyi (yellow card) 40'	Report	Gilberto 9'; Ramos 37'	Stadium: Stadion Miejski im. Władysława Króla; Attendance: 16,450; Referee: Felix Zwayer (Germany)

23 August 2022 Second leg	Benfica (Portugal)	3–0 (5–0 agg.)	(Ukraine) Dynamo Kyiv	Lisbon, Portugal
20:00 WEST (UTC+01:00)	Otamendi 27'; R. Silva 40'; Neres 42'; Musa (yellow card) 85'	Report	Shaparenko (yellow card) 81'	Stadium: Estádio da Luz; Attendance: 58,705; Referee: Clément Turpin (France)

=== UEFA Europa League ===
==== Group stage ====
The draw for the group stage was held on 26 August 2022.

Pos	Team	Pld	W	D	L	GF	GA	GD	Pts	Qualification
1	(Turkey) Fenerbahçe	6	4	2	0	13	7	+6	14	Advance to round of 16
2	(France) Rennes	6	3	3	0	11	8	+3	12	Advance to knockout round play-offs
3	(Cyprus) AEK Larnaca	6	1	2	3	7	10	−3	5	Transfer to Europa Conference League
4	(Ukraine) Dynamo Kyiv	6	0	1	5	5	11	−6	1	

Source: UEFA
Rules for classification: Group stage tiebreakers

8 September 2022 1	Fenerbahçe (Turkey)	2–1	(Ukraine) Dynamo Kyiv	Istanbul, Turkey
19:45 EEST (UTC+3)	Gustavo Henrique 35'; King (yellow card) 50'; Rossi (yellow card) 68'; Yandaş (yellow card) 72'; Alioski (yellow card) 82'; Batshuayi 90+1'; Bayındır (yellow card) 90+6'	Report	Harmash (yellow card) 11'; Tsyhankov 63'; Syrota (yellow card) 78'; Bushchan (yellow card) 87'	Stadium: Şükrü Saracoğlu Stadium; Attendance: 41,895; Referee: Tamás Bognár (Hungary)

15 September 2022 2	Dynamo Kyiv (Ukraine)	0–1	(Cyprus) AEK Larnaca	Kraków, Poland (Note: Due to the Russian invasion of Ukraine, Ukrainian teams are required to play their home matches at neutral venues until further notice. Therefore, Dynamo Kyiv play at Stadion Cracovii im. Józefa Piłsudskiego, Kraków, Poland, instead of their regular stadium NSC Olimpiyskiy, Kyiv.)
22:00 EEST (UTC+3)	Andriyevskyi (yellow card) 35'; Sydorchuk (yellow card) 76'	Report	Gyurcsó 8'; Ángel (yellow card) 42'; Mamas (yellow card) 44'; Pons (yellow card) 63'; Pirić (yellow card) 83'	Stadium: Stadion Cracovii im. Józefa Piłsudskiego; Attendance: 3,362; Referee: Jakob Kehlet (Denmark)

6 October 2022 3	Rennes (France)	2–1	(Ukraine) Dynamo Kyiv	Rennes, France
22:00 EEST (UTC+3)	Terrier 23'; D.Doué 89'	Report	Tsyhankov 33'; Zabarnyi (yellow card) 88'	Stadium: Roazhon Park; Attendance: 24,761; Referee: José María Sánchez Martínez (Spain)

13 October 2022 4	Dynamo Kyiv (Ukraine)	0–1	(France) Rennes	Kraków, Poland
19:45 EEST (UTC+3)	Besedin (yellow card) 44'; Tymchyk (yellow card) 53'; Vanat (yellow card) 90+5'	Report	Bourigeaud (yellow card) 24'; Wooh 48'; D.Doué (yellow card) 70'	Stadium: Stadion Cracovii im. Józefa Piłsudskiego; Attendance: 5,398; Referee: Serdar Gözübüyük (Netherlands)

27 October 2022 5	AEK Larnaca (Cyprus)	3–3	(Ukraine) Dynamo Kyiv	Larnaca, Cyprus
19:45 EEST (UTC+3)	Altman 26', 72'; Lopes 53'; Rosales (yellow card) 79'	Report	Shepelyev (yellow card) 35'; Vanat 45'; Tsyhankov (yellow card) 55'; Zabarnyi (yellow card) 69'; Harmash 82', 90+2'; Diallo (yellow card) 85'	Stadium: AEK Arena – Georgios Karapatakis; Attendance: 4,321; Referee: John Beaton (Scotland)

3 November 2022 6	Dynamo Kyiv (Ukraine)	0–2	(Turkey) Fenerbahçe	Kraków, Poland
22:00 EET (UTC+2)	Harmash (yellow card) 52'; Zabarnyi (yellow card) 57' (yellow-red card) 68'; Sydorchuk (yellow card) 90+3'	Report	Güler 23'; Arão 45+2'; Szalai (yellow card) 64'; Mor (yellow card) 90'; Kahveci (yellow card) 90+5'	Stadium: Stadion Cracovii im. Józefa Piłsudskiego; Attendance: 6,304; Referee: Duje Strukan (Croatia)

== Squad statistics ==
As of match played 28 April 2023

=== Appearances and goals ===
No.	Pos	Nat	Player	Total		Premier League		UEFA Champions League		UEFA Europa League	
No.	Pos	Nat	Player	Apps	Goals	Apps	Goals	Apps	Goals	Apps	Goals
1	GK	(Ukraine) UKR	Heorhiy Bushchan	13	0	5	0	6	0	2	0
2	DF	(Ukraine) UKR	Kostyantyn Vivcharenko	28	2	10+8	1	1+4	1	2+3	0
4	DF	(Ukraine) UKR	Denys Popov	23	0	15+2	0	4	0	2	0
5	MF	(Ukraine) UKR	Serhiy Sydorchuk	33	0	21+1	0	5	0	6	0
7	FW	(Ukraine) UKR	Vladyslav Kabayev	21	0	13+2	0	0	0	4+2	0
8	MF	(Ukraine) UKR	Volodymyr Shepelyev	29	1	15+3	1	4+1	0	4+2	0
9	FW	(Jamaica) JAM	Kaheem Parris	9	0	0+8	0	0	0	0+1	0
10	MF	(Ukraine) UKR	Mykola Shaparenko	9	0	1+1	0	6	0	1	0
11	FW	(Ukraine) UKR	Vladyslav Vanat	32	10	17+4	9	0+6	0	2+3	1
14	MF	(Ukraine) UKR	Oleksandr Yatsyk	3	0	0+2	0	0+1	0	0	0
15	FW	(Venezuela) VEN	Eric Ramírez	7	1	0+7	1	0	0	0	0
18	MF	(Ukraine) UKR	Oleksandr Andriyevskyi	14	1	4+5	1	1+2	0	1+1	0
19	MF	(Ukraine) UKR	Denys Harmash	30	2	4+17	0	0+4	0	3+2	2
20	DF	(Ukraine) UKR	Oleksandr Karavayev	26	2	11+5	0	2+4	2	0+4	0
22	MF	(Netherlands) NED	Justin Lonwijk	15	1	11+4	1	0	0	0	0
24	DF	(Ukraine) UKR	Oleksandr Tymchyk	17	1	11+2	1	0+1	0	3	0
25	DF	(Ukraine) UKR	Maksym Dyachuk	8	0	8	0	0	0	0	0
29	MF	(Ukraine) UKR	Vitaliy Buyalskyi	32	12	20	11	6	1	6	0
30	MF	(Senegal) SEN	Samba Diallo	3	0	0+1	0	0	0	0+2	0
34	DF	(Ukraine) UKR	Oleksandr Syrota	20	1	8+3	1	2+2	0	4+1	0
35	GK	(Ukraine) UKR	Ruslan Neshcheret	18	0	15+1	0	0	0	2	0
37	MF	(Ukraine) UKR	Anton Tsarenko	9	1	3+4	1	0+2	0	0	0
41	FW	(Ukraine) UKR	Artem Besedin	20	0	4+5	0	6	0	3+2	0
44	DF	(Ukraine) UKR	Vladyslav Dubinchak	24	0	10+4	0	5+1	0	4	0
71	GK	(Ukraine) UKR	Denys Boyko	5	0	3	0	0	0	2	0
77	MF	(Nigeria) NGR	Benito	7	0	6+1	0	0	0	0	0
91	MF	(Ukraine) UKR	Nazar Voloshyn	6	0	3+3	0	0	0	0	0
Players who suspended their contracts:
Players away on loan:
6	DF	(Ukraine) UKR	Mykyta Burda	2	0	1	0	0	0	1	0
21	MF	(Ukraine) UKR	Mykyta Kravchenko	4	0	1+2	0	0	0	0+1	0
94	DF	(Poland) POL	Tomasz Kędziora	18	0	6+3	0	6	0	3	0
Players who left Dynamo Kyiv during the season:
7	MF	(Slovenia) SLO	Benjamin Verbič	2	0	0	0	2	0	0	0
15	MF	(Ukraine) UKR	Viktor Tsyhankov	23	9	13	6	4	1	6	2
25	DF	(Ukraine) UKR	Illya Zabarnyi	25	0	14	0	6	0	5	0
28	FW	(Ukraine) UKR	Vladyslav Kulach	2	0	0+2	0	0	0	0	0

=== Goalscorers ===
Place	Position	Nation	Number	Name	Premier League	Champions League	Europa League	Total
1	MF	(Ukraine)	29	Vitaliy Buyalskyi	11	1	0	12
2	FW	(Ukraine)	11	Vladyslav Vanat	9	0	1	10
3	MF	(Ukraine)	15	Viktor Tsyhankov	6	1	2	9
4	DF	(Ukraine)	2	Kostyantyn Vivcharenko	1	1	0	2
4	DF	(Ukraine)	20	Oleksandr Karavayev	0	2	0	2
4	MF	(Ukraine)	19	Denys Harmash	0	0	2	2
7	DF	(Ukraine)	24	Oleksandr Tymchyk	1	0	0	1
7	MF	(Netherlands)	22	Justin Lonwijk	1	0	0	1
7	MF	(Ukraine)	8	Volodymyr Shepelyev	1	0	0	1
7	FW	(Venezuela)	15	Eric Ramírez	1	0	0	1
7	MF	(Ukraine)	37	Anton Tsarenko	1	0	0	1
7	MF	(Ukraine)	18	Oleksandr Andriyevskyi	1	0	0	1
7	DF	(Ukraine)	34	Oleksandr Syrota	1	0	0	1
TOTALS					34	5	5	44

=== Clean sheets ===
Place	Position	Nation	Number	Name	Premier League	Champions League	Europa League	Total
1	GK	(Ukraine)	35	Ruslan Neshcheret	4	0	0	4
1	GK	(Ukraine)	1	Heorhiy Bushchan	2	2	0	4
3	GK	(Ukraine)	71	Denys Boyko	3	0	0	3
TOTALS					9	2	0	11

=== Disciplinary record ===
Number	Nation	Position	Name	Premier League		Champions League		Europa League		Total	
Number	Nation	Position	Name	Yellow card	Red card	Yellow card	Red card	Yellow card	Red card	Yellow card	Red card
1	(Ukraine)	GK	Heorhiy Bushchan	1	0	1	0	1	0	3	0
2	(Ukraine)	DF	Kostyantyn Vivcharenko	3	0	0	0	0	0	3	0
4	(Ukraine)	DF	Denys Popov	5	1	2	0	0	0	7	1
5	(Ukraine)	MF	Serhiy Sydorchuk	6	0	3	0	2	0	11	0
7	(Ukraine)	FW	Vladyslav Kabayev	1	0	0	0	0	0	1	0
8	(Ukraine)	MF	Volodymyr Shepelyev	3	0	1	0	1	0	5	0
10	(Ukraine)	MF	Mykola Shaparenko	1	0	2	0	0	0	3	0
11	(Ukraine)	FW	Vladyslav Vanat	4	0	1	0	1	0	6	0
14	(Ukraine)	MF	Oleksandr Yatsyk	1	0	0	0	0	0	1	0
15	(Venezuela)	FW	Eric Ramírez	1	0	0	0	0	0	1	0
18	(Ukraine)	MF	Oleksandr Andriyevskyi	1	0	1	0	1	0	3	0
19	(Ukraine)	MF	Denys Harmash	1	0	3	0	2	0	6	0
20	(Ukraine)	DF	Oleksandr Karavayev	4	0	1	0	0	0	5	0
22	(Netherlands)	MF	Justin Lonwijk	3	0	0	0	0	0	3	0
24	(Ukraine)	DF	Oleksandr Tymchyk	3	0	0	0	1	0	4	0
25	(Ukraine)	DF	Maksym Dyachuk	1	0	0	0	0	0	1	0
29	(Ukraine)	MF	Vitaliy Buyalskyi	2	1	1	0	0	0	3	1
30	(Senegal)	MF	Samba Diallo	0	0	0	0	1	0	1	0
34	(Ukraine)	DF	Oleksandr Syrota	4	0	0	0	1	0	5	0
41	(Ukraine)	FW	Artem Besedin	1	0	1	0	1	0	3	0
44	(Ukraine)	DF	Vladyslav Dubinchak	2	0	1	0	0	0	3	0
77	(Nigeria)	MF	Benito	2	0	0	0	0	0	2	0
Players away on loan:
Players who left Dynamo Kyiv during the season:
15	(Ukraine)	MF	Viktor Tsyhankov	1	0	2	0	1	0	4	0
25	(Ukraine)	DF	Illya Zabarnyi	1	1	0	0	4	1	5	2
			TOTALS	54	3	20	0	17	1	91	4
