= Anton Bol =

Ukrainian footballer (born 2003)

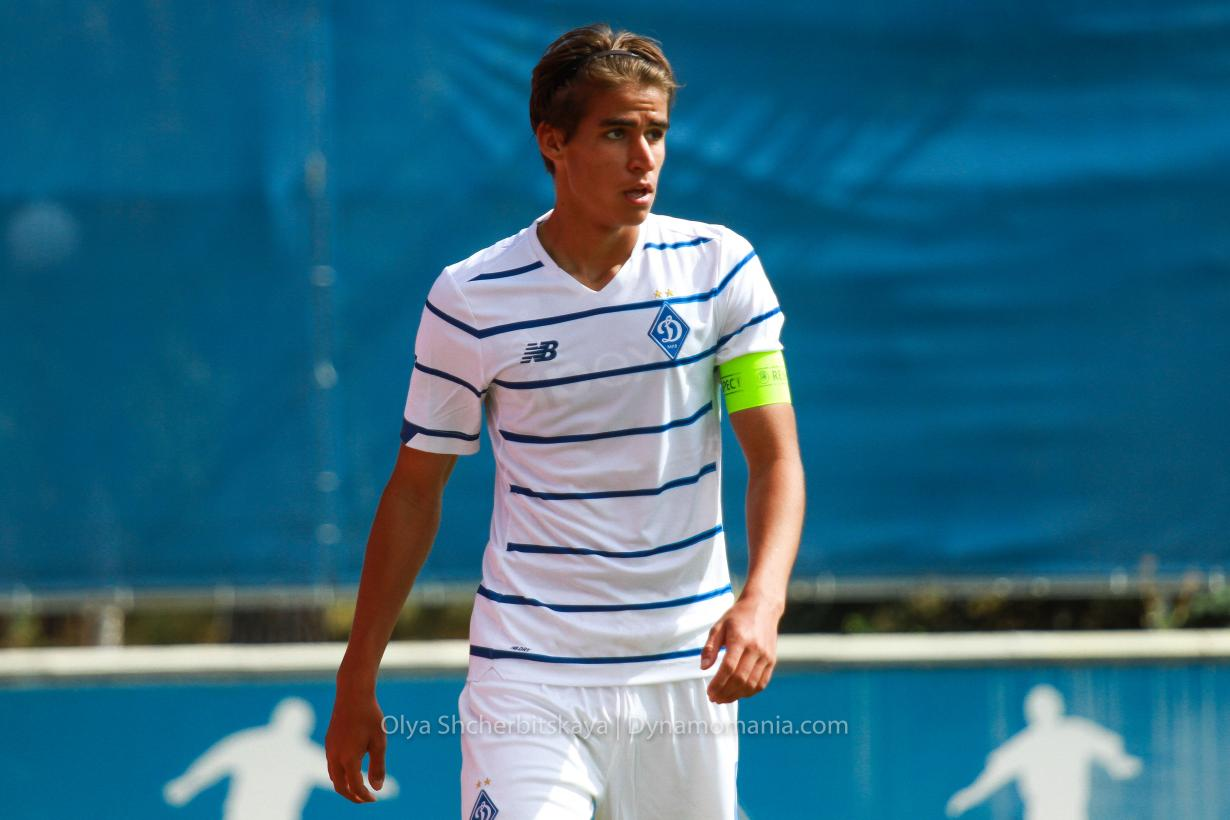

Personal information
- Full name: Anton Yuriyovych Bol
- Date of birth: 8 January 2003 (age 23)
- Place of birth: Zhytomyr, Ukraine
- Height: 1.87 m (6 ft 2 in)
- Position: Centre-back

Team information
- Current team: Oleksandriya
- Number: 86

Youth career
- 2008–2016: Feniks Zhytomyr
- 2016–2021: Dynamo Kyiv

Senior career*
| Years | Team | Apps | (Gls) |
| 2021–2024 | Dynamo Kyiv | 3 | (0) |
| 2023–2024 | → Zorya Luhansk (loan) | 8 | (0) |
| 2025– | Oleksandriya | 25 | (0) |

International career^{‡}
| 2018 | Ukraine U15 | 2 | (0) |
| 2018 | Ukraine U16 | 2 | (0) |
| 2021–2023 | Ukraine U21 | 7 | (0) |
| 2024 | Ukraine U23 | 1 | (0) |
- * Club domestic league appearances and goals as of 3 June 2026 ‡ National team caps and goals as of 19 June 2025

Anton Yuriyovych Bol (Ukrainian: Антон Юрійович Боль; born 8 January 2003) is a Ukrainian professional footballer who plays as a centre-back for Oleksandriya.

== Club career ==
=== Early years ===
Born in Zhytomyr, Bol is a product of Feniks Zhytomyr and Dynamo Kyiv academies.

=== Dynamo Kyiv ===
Bol played initially for Dynamo Kyiv in the Ukrainian Premier League Reserves. He made his debut for Dynamo Kyiv only on 20 May 2023 in the Ukrainian Premier League, playing in a winning away match against FC Oleksandriya.

== International career ==
On 6 March 2024, Bol was called up by Ruslan Rotan to the Ukraine Olympic football team preliminary squad as a preparation to the 2024 Summer Olympics.

== Career statistics ==
=== Club ===
As of match played 24 May 2023

| Club | Season | League | | | Ukrainian Cup | | Europe | | Total | |
| Club | Season | Division | Apps | Goals | Apps | Goals | Apps | Goals | Apps | Goals |
|---|---|---|---|---|---|---|---|---|---|---|
| Dynamo Kyiv | 2022–23 | Ukrainian Premier League | 2 | 0 | 0 | 0 | 0 | 0 | 2 | 0 |
| Career total | | | 2 | 0 | 0 | 0 | 0 | 0 | 2 | 0 |
