= Game4Ukraine =

2023 charity football match

Team Zinchenko	Team Shevchenko
Arsene Wenger	Emma Hayes
2	2
- Date: 5 August 2023
- Venue: Stamford Bridge, Fulham, London
- Referee: David Coote
- Attendance: 30,000
- Weather: 16 °C (61 °F), showers

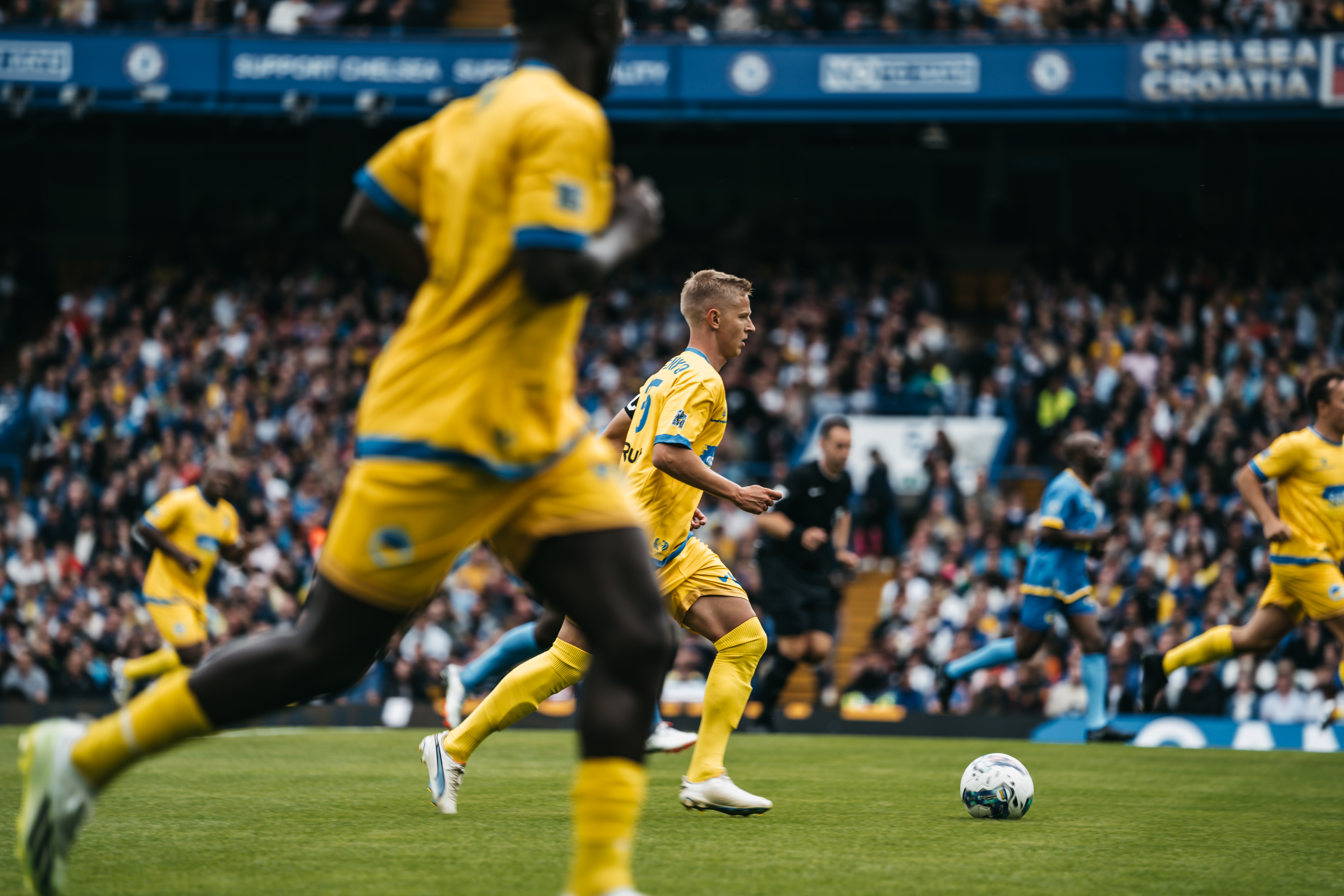
Oleksandr Zinchenko, Photo of Oleksandr Zinchenko, captured by András Stefuca, part of the We Stream team, at Game4Ukraine.

Game4Ukraine was a charity football match played on 5 August 2023 to raise money for the United24 initiative, a fundraiser to help in Ukraine's rebuilding of facilities and infrastructure that suffered damage from the Russian invasion of Ukraine as well as the ongoing Russo-Ukrainian War. It was played at Stamford Bridge, home stadium of Chelsea F.C. Past and present Ukrainian footballers Oleksandr Zinchenko and Andriy Shevchenko featured as team captains for "Team Zinchenko" and "Team Shevchenko" respectively, whose teams each played in yellow and blue (colours in the flag of Ukraine), along with other players as well as celebrities. The game was mixed-sex, with several women footballers playing.

The match was produced by Legends Soccer Group for Sky and televised live on Sky Max, Sky Showcase and the Freeview channel Pick. Entertainers that were present at the event included Melanie C, The Pretenders, Pete Doherty, Tom Walker, Tom Grennan and Sviatoslav Vakarchuk. The event was also covered by We Stream, who provided video and photo documentation of the entire match.

== Pre-match ==
=== Opening ceremony ===
Fans in the stadium, as well as those watching on TV in the UK and around the World, saw a great line-up of players and celebrities on the pitch. There were also two DJ sets, two sopranos performing the national anthems, an address from the President of Ukraine, Volodymyr Zelenskyy, live stage performances from Tom Walker, Pete Doherty, BoomBox, Vakarchuk, Tom Grennan, and The Pretenders, as detailed below.

The half-time show was performances from Pete Doherty, BoomBox, and Tom Walker. Pete performed a version of "Dirty Old Town" in Ukrainian, BoomBox with lead singer Andriy Khlyvnyuk performed "Hey Hey Rise Up" with his band, and Tom Walker followed with his first big hit, "Leave a Light On".

== Teams ==
Team Zinchenko (Team Yellow)

Professionals

- Oleksandr Zinchenko (captain)
- Jens Lehmann
- Joleon Lescott
- Per Mertesacker
- Robert Pires
- John Arne Riise
- Antonio Valencia
- Wes Morgan
- Jack Wilshere
- Bacary Sagna
- David James
- Charlie Adam
- Mark Noble
- Gaël Clichy
- Martin Škrtel
- Yevhen Konoplyanka
- Yevhen Levchenko
- Oleh Luzhnyi
- Mikaël Silvestre
- Darijo Srna
- Gilberto Silva
- Katie Chapman
- Jessica Hurtado
- Rachel Yankey
- Yakubu

Celebrities

- Tom Grennan
- Phil Dunster
- Roman Kemp
- Hero Fiennes Tiffin

Manager: Arsène Wenger

Team Shevchenko (Team Blue)

Professionals

- Andriy Shevchenko (captain)
- Michael Essien
- Luca Toni
- Dida
- Massimo Oddo
- Gianfranco Zola
- Carlo Cudicini
- Claude Makélélé
- William Gallas
- Samuel Eto'o
- Mykhailo Mudryk
- Clarence Seedorf
- Fabio Cannavaro
- Shota Arveladze
- Christian Panucci
- Jimmy Floyd Hasselbaink
- Joe Cole
- Serginho
- Jermain Defoe
- Petr Čech
- Serhiy Rebrov
- Gerard Piqué
- Júlio César
- Claire Rafferty
- Carly Telford

Celebrities

- Russell Howard
- Toheeb Jimoh
- Ralf Little
- James Arthur
- Chelcee Grimes
- Archie Renaux

Manager: Emma Hayes

Confirmed to play

- Edgar Davids
- Eric Abidal
- Ricardo Carvalho
- Danny Drinkwater
- Glen Johnson
- Ben Cohen
- Ben Shephard
- Mark Strong
- Patrick Owomoyela
- Patrick Vieira
- Robbie Keane
- Patrik Berger

== See also ==
- Soccer Aid
- Global Tour for Peace
- Game 4 Grenfell
- 1963 England v Rest of the World football match
- UEFA Celebration Match
- Match Against Poverty
- Football for Hope
