= Illya Skrypnyk =

Ukrainian footballer

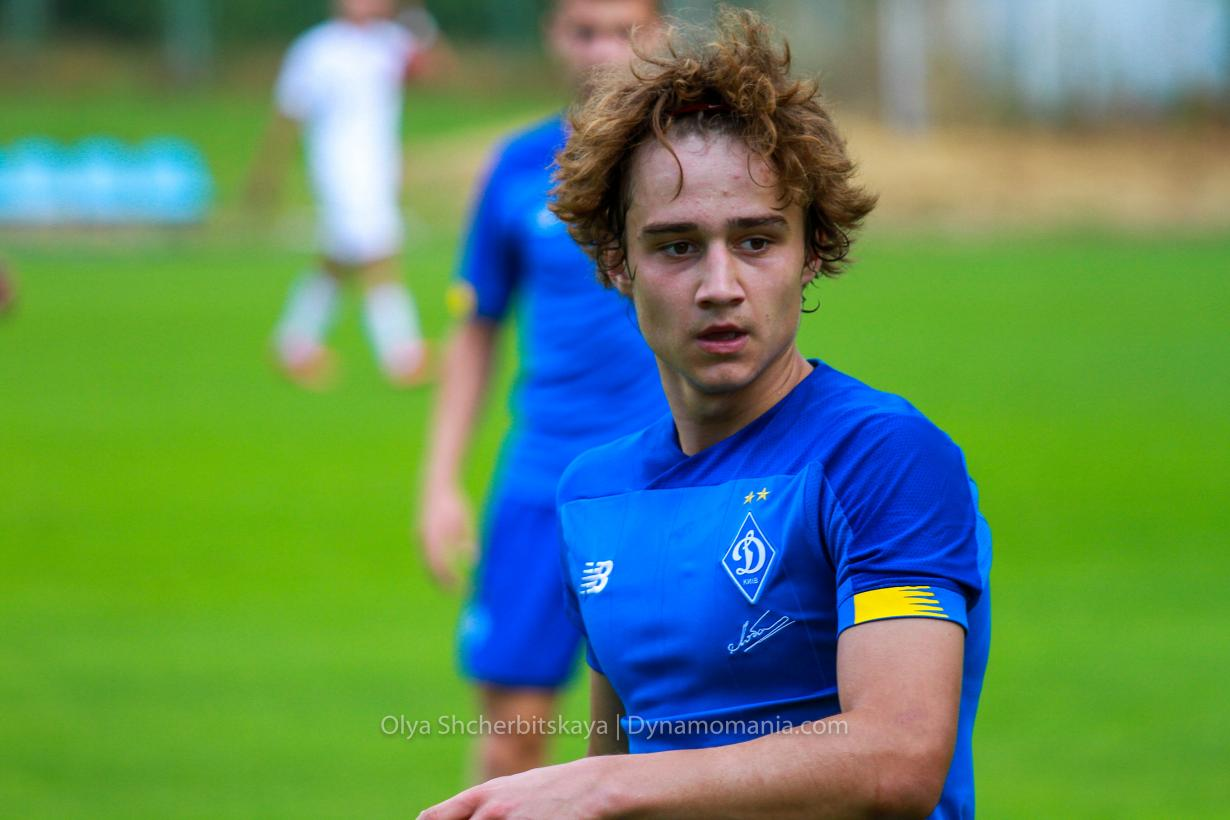

Personal information
- Full name: Illya Eduardovych Skrypnyk
- Date of birth: 25 June 2003 (age 23)
- Place of birth: Chernivtsi, Ukraine
- Height: 1.78 m (5 ft 10 in)
- Position: Central midfielder

Team information
- Current team: Gagra
- Number: 8

Youth career
- 2016–2017: Bukovyna Chernivtsi
- 2017–2020: Dynamo Kyiv

Senior career*
| Years | Team | Apps | (Gls) |
| 2020–2023 | Dynamo Kyiv | 0 | (0) |
| 2022–2023 | → Bukovyna Chernivtsi (loan) | 18 | (4) |
| 2023–2024 | Fossano | | |
| 2025 | Sevlievo | 2 | (0) |
| 2025 | 1. SC Znojmo | 14 | (0) |
| 2025– | Gagra | 33 | (3) |
- * Club domestic league appearances and goals as of 10 July 2026 @ 13:25(AEST)

Illya Eduardovych Skrypnyk (Ukrainian: Ілля Едуардович Скрипник; born 25 June 2003) is a Ukrainian professional footballer who plays as a central midfielder for Georgian club Gagra.

== Career ==
In summer 2022 he moved on loan to Bukovyna Chernivtsi. On 14 April 2023 he scored against Chernihiv in Ukrainian First League.

In November 2023 he signed a contract with Italian Fossano Calcio.

In January 2025 he joined Bulgarian Second League team Fratria on trials. After 2 weeks, he moved to another Bulgarian Second league team and joined Pirin Blagoevgrad on trials.

== Career statistics ==
=== Club ===
As of match played 11 September 2022

| Club | Season | League | | | Cup | | Continental | | Other | | Total | |
| Club | Season | Division | Apps | Goals | Apps | Goals | Apps | Goals | Apps | Goals | Apps | Goals |
|---|---|---|---|---|---|---|---|---|---|---|---|---|
| Bukovyna Chernivtsi (loan) | 2022–23 | Ukrainian First League | 3 | 1 | 0 | 0 | — | | — | | 3 | 1 |
| Bukovyna Chernivtsi (loan) | Total | | 3 | 1 | 0 | 0 | 0 | 0 | 0 | 0 | 3 | 1 |
| Career total | | | 3 | 1 | 0 | 0 | 0 | 0 | 0 | 0 | 3 | 1 |
