= Global Tour for Peace =

2022 association football charity tournament

- Organiser(s): Ukrainian Association of Football, Dynamo Kyiv & Shakhtar Donetsk
- Founded: 7 April 2022; 4 years ago
- Abolished: 16 August 2022; 3 years ago
- Region: Europe (Belgium, Croatia, England, Estonia, France, Germany, Greece, Italy, Netherlands, Poland, Romania, Slovenia Switzerland, Turkey); Asia (Saudi Arabia, Turkey)
- Teams: Ukraine: 3 (Dynamo Kyiv, Shakhtar Donetsk & Ukraine); Rest of Europe: 25; Asia: 4
- Broadcaster(s): Ukraine: 2+2, Football 1, Indigo TV, Kyivstar TV, M1, MEGOGO, XSPORT; Belgium: Eleven; Croatia: HRT 2 England: DAZN, ESPN+ Estonia: ERR, ETV2; Germany: ProSieben, ZDF; Greece: One Channel; Italy: DAZN; Netherlands: ESPN, Ziggo; Poland: Polsat, Polsat Sport, TVP; Romania: Prima TV; Turkey: Galatasaray TV, TRT 3, TV8; International: 1+1, YouTube
- Motto: Dynamo: "Match for Peace! Let's Stop the War!"; Shakhtar: "Football for Peace. Stop War in Ukraine."

The "Global Tour for Peace" was a European tour of international club friendlies organised by two Ukrainian football clubs whose football league had to cease due to the 2022 Russian invasion of Ukraine. The aim of the tour was to raise funds to provide aid for people in Ukraine affected by the Russian invasion. The Ukrainian teams involved with the tour were Dynamo Kyiv and Shakhtar Donetsk, the two most successful teams coming out the Ukrainian Premier League, as well as the Ukraine national football team who played friendlies in preparation for their World Cup qualification games in June 2022.

The tour can be split into two phases. The first phase was a reaction to the Russian invasion, raising money for refugees, and the need to keep the Ukraine national team players match fit for the 2022 World Cup qualifiers. The second phase is of friendlies being used to raise money while the teams are preparing for the resumption of the Ukrainian Premier League.

The Dynamo Kyiv tour played with the name "Tour for Peace in Ukraine", with each match playing under one of the following titles, "Match for Peace! Stop the War!" and "Hand in Hand for Peace", while the Shakhtar Donetsk tour was played under the name "Shakhtar Global Tour for Peace".

In total 32 games were played during the tour against 30 clubs. Clubs from 16 countries on two continents took part in the tour, with over 250,000 fans attending the games, and over €1 million raised in confirmed donations, with the total possibly being much higher due to 15 clubs yet to release the figures of their own fundraisers. Over 100 goals were scored during the friendlies. These 104 goals came from 72 players, who were from 26 countries on four continents. The tour saw fans from many nationalities coming together to show support for Ukraine in the wake of the invasion, and showing condemnation for Russia's actions.

== Organisation of the tour ==
On 24 February 2022 Russian forces invaded Ukraine resulting in all sporting events in Ukraine being stopped. In the initial days of the war players and staff members of Dynamo Kyiv helped people from the capital to flee the city and country, while also helping those who stayed in Kyiv. Dynamo Kyiv suggested to Ukrainian president, Volodymyr Zelenskyy, that the clubs personnel could leave Ukraine and go on a tour around Europe spreading Ukraine's message of peace. Zelenskyy agreed to the tour, and the club left Ukraine and based themselves in the Romanian capital, Bucharest.

After Dynamo's plans for a tour were accepted Shakhtar Donetsk, who had been displaced from their home city since 2014 due to the war in Donbas, formally applied to Zelenskyy too to start their own tour and the right to leave the country during the war. Shakhtar based themselves in Riva, Istanbul, Turkey.

The main objective of the tour was to help raise money for the humanitarian crisis caused by the Russian invasion and to support Ukrainians who have been displaced by the war. A secondary objective of the tour was also helping the Ukraine national team players prepare for their World Cup qualifying games against Scotland, and potentially Wales, as after their domestic league was cancelled as a result of the invasion it denied half of the international players the chance to stay match fit.

The tour was fully supported by UEFA, the Ukrainian Ministry of Youth and Sports, Ministry of Culture and Information Policy of Ukraine, Ministry of Social Policy of Ukraine, and the Ministry of Foreign Affairs of Ukraine.

=== Dynamo and Shakhtar ===
Dynamo and Shakhtar are Ukraine's most successful and most supported clubs in the country. Since Ukraine's independence in 1991, Dynamo and Shakhtar have won a combined total of 29 Ukrainian Premier League titles out of 30 (16 for Dynamo, 13 for Shakhtar), with Tavriya Simferopol being the only other club to win a Ukrainian title, coming in 1992, the first season in an independent Ukraine. The two clubs have also dominated the Ukrainian Cup, winning the competition a combined 26 times out of 30 (both with 13 wins) and both teams having a perfect record in the Ukrainian Super Cup, winning the competition a combined 18 times out of 18 (both with 9 wins).

Due to the two teams' dominance in their domestic competitions, Dynamo Kyiv and Shakhtar Donetsk are the most recognisable clubs to play in Ukraine, with both clubs regularly competing in European competitions. Both teams often have the core of players who are called up to represent the Ukraine national team.

For the tour, Dynamo chose to hold their series of games under the name "Tour for Peace in Ukraine". The club further played each game with one of two mottos, "Match for Peace! Stop the War!", which was the most commonly used motto for the games and "Hand in Hand for Peace" being the second motto, but which was only used in one match. All of the games played under the "Match for Peace! Stop the War!" motto featured a small concert with Ukrainian singers before, during half-time and after the game. The "Hand in Hand for Peace" game is the only Dynamo game so far to be held without a concert during the event.

The tour for Shakhtar was held under the name "Shakhtar Global Tour for Peace". Like the refugees that the tour is mostly raising money for, Shakhtar have faced the situation of being forced out of their home, having been unable to play in their home stadium (the Donbas Arena) since 2014 when Russian forces invaded Crimea and the Donbas region, starting the Russo-Ukrainian War. Since 2014, Shakhtar have played their home games at Tsentralnyi Stadion in Cherkasy, Obolon Arena in Kyiv, Chornomorets Stadium in Odesa, Slavutych-Arena in Zaporizhzhia, Bannikov Stadium in Kyiv, Arena Lviv in Lviv, OSC Metalist in Kharkiv and the NSC Olimpiyskiy in Kyiv. For the majority of the games on the Shakhtar tour, both teams have played without a sponsor on the front of their shirts, instead, wearing a Ukrainian flag with "Stop War" written on it in the sponsorships' place.

== Teams (phase one) ==
Locations of the teams involved in the Global Tour for Peace. The short names of the clubs have been used.

Played against

- Dynamo
- Shakhtar
- Ukraine
- Multiple matches in these locations. See map below.
Istanbul clubs taking part in the charity tour.

Date	Team	Nat.	Stadium	Capacity
(Ukraine) FC Dynamo Kyiv
"Tour for Peace in Ukraine"
12 April 2022	Legia Warsaw	(Poland)	Stadion Wojska Polskiego	31,800
14 April 2022	Galatasaray	(Turkey)	Nef Stadium	52,280
20 April 2022	CFR Cluj	(Romania)	CFR Cluj Stadium	23,500
26 April 2022	Borussia Dortmund	(Germany)	Westfalenstadion	81,365
28 April 2022	Dinamo Zagreb	(Croatia)	Stadion Maksimir	25,000
4 May 2022	Basel	(Switzerland)	St. Jakob-Park	38,512
13 May 2022	Flora	(Estonia)	A. Le Coq Arena	14,336
(Ukraine) FC Shakhtar Donetsk
"Shakhtar Global Tour for Peace"
9 April 2022	Olympiacos	(Greece)	Karaiskakis Stadium	32,115
14 April 2022	Lechia Gdańsk	(Poland)	Stadion Gdańsk	41,620
19 April 2022	Fenerbahçe	(Turkey)	Şükrü Saracoğlu Stadium	50,530
25 April 2022	Antalyaspor	(Turkey)	Antalya Stadium	32,537
1 May 2022	Hajduk Split	(Croatia)	Stadion Poljud	33,987
Ukraine national team
11 May 2022	Borussia Mönchengladbach	(Germany)	Borussia-Park	54,057
17 May 2022	Empoli	(Italy)	Stadio Carlo Castellani	16,284
18 May 2022	Rijeka	(Croatia)	Stadion HNK Rijeka	8,279

== Dynamo & Shakhtar tours ==
=== Greece ===
The tour started on 9 April 2022 with Shakhtar Donetsk playing in Greece against Olympiacos. This was the first time a professional team from Ukraine had played a game since the invasion of Russian forces. The teams wore "Stop War" on their shirts in place of sponsors, with Shakhtar players wearing names of cities and towns heavily bombed by Russian forces in place of their own last names. The stadium however saw a low attendance, in part due to the event being organised at short notice, with another factor being that Olympiacos ultras were not wanting to condemn the war due to their fan friendship with Russian football team Spartak Moscow. Those Olympiacos fans who were in attendance left toys on empty seats to be donated to the children of Ukraine. Shakhtar, who had only 1 training session since the invasion and with the loss of all of their foreign born players due to the invasion, fell to a 1–0 defeat.

The amount raised from the Olympiacos game was ₴3.2 million (€100k).

=== Poland ===
Dynamo Kyiv's tour started on 12 April 2022 in the Polish capital, playing against the Polish champions Legia Warsaw. The match was attended by over 20,000, however the fans from the Żyleta section of the stadium were notably absent, with a Legia fan group announcing that after discussions with Dynamo fans, who feel that their owners Ihor and Hryhoriy Surkis have pro-Russian views, decided not to attend the match. Before the game both teams players were draped in Ukrainian flags, with a large banners of "Stop The War" featuring on the Żyleta end of the stadium, and banners of "Stop Russia Now" also featuring around the ground. Dynamo won their match with their first goal of the tour coming from Vitaliy Buyalskyi. The match paired up to being a concert too, with performances before and after the game, as well as during half-time. The singing performances for the Legia game were from Tina Karol, Julia Sanina (from the band The Hardkiss), Kateryna Pavlenko, and Dorofeeva. Due to Poland accepting more Ukrainian refugees than any other country the game in Warsaw saw a large amount of Ukrainian's in attendance who had either been displaced by the initial invasion in 2014, or displaced by the more recent events in 2022.

Prior to the Lechia Gdańsk game against Shakhtar an initiative was set up by the Gdańsk Foundation as part of the "Gdańsk Helps Ukraine" campaign called the "Ticket for Peace". The initiative was set up so that people could make a ticket donation online so that a Ukrainian refugee living in Gdańsk would be able to attend the game for free. Lechia brought out a red kit for specifically for the game, with Shakhtar opting to wear their white third kit for the game. The game was 2–1 to Shakhtar going into stoppage time, with Lechia equalising in the 92nd minute. After Lechia's equaliser, Dmytro Keda, a 12-year-old Shakhtar fan who had escaped from the Siege of Mariupol and fled to Poland, came on as a substitute and scored Shakhtar's winning goal in the 94th minute. The first two goals in the tour for Shakhtar both came from Mykhailo Mudryk, and the game saw over 12,000 spectators in attendance, the second highest attendance Lechia had for a home game that season.

The total amount raised from the Polish section of the tour was ₴9.5 million (€298k). ₴7 million (€220k) was raised from the Legia game, and ₴2.5 million (€78k) from the Lechia game.

=== Turkey ===
The tour in Turkey, which would see two games being played in Istanbul, started on 14 April 2022. The first game played in Turkey was between Dynamo and Galatasaray. The game saw the Dynamo manager, Mircea Lucescu, facing the team he had previously managed from 2000 to 2002. Apart from Galatasary, Lucescu also managed Beşiktaş and the Turkish national team, highlighting before the game that "he knows very well how helpful the Turkish people are" and the hopes that the games in Turkey can help to raise the needed funds for those Ukrainians who have been displaced. The crowd for the Galatasaray was a contrast of what was experienced with Dynamo's game against Legia, where the large amount of Ukrainians in attendance made the game feel more like both sides were equally supported. The Galatasaray fans made a more intimidating atmosphere, one which would be expected in a European club game. Despite the loud support for the home team, Dynamo comfortably won the match 3–1 with both Buialskyi and Besedin each scoring in their second consecutive game of the tour.

The second game of the tour to be played in Turkey was Fenerbahçe against Shakhtar. This was to be the first of two games in the Turkish capital for Shakthar in Turkey, who based themselves in Istanbul city for the first phase of the tour. While warming up, Shakhtar players wore t-shirts showing a picture of a 4 year old Ukrainian girl called Alisa, who has been trapped in Mariupol during the siege, and at the time of the game had spent 55 days living underground in a bunker. Over 11,000 fans attended the game, with chants of "Ukraine! Ukraine! Ukraine!" being heard from Fenerbahçe fans and Ukrainians in attendance throughout the match. Despite both teams hitting the woodwork, Fenerbahçe won the game 1–0 with the only goal coming in the first half from Enner Valencia. After the match, while the story of Alisa and the pre-match shirts was again being highlighted, comments made by the Shakhtar goalkeeper, Andriy Pyatov, stated that more attention needed to be given to the fact that over 200 Ukrainian children had already died due to the actions of the Russian army and calling for the Russian army to stop their war of aggression.

Shakhtar's second and the third game to be played in Turkey was the game against Antalyaspor. Before the game Shakhtar players once again wore tshirts bearing a message of the war. Before the game with Antalyaspor the warm-up shirts highlighted the number of children who had been killed since the outbreak of the war. The two teams started the game well, each finding the net in the first quarter of the game. After going in level at the break, both teams made a high number of substitutions with Shakhtar edging the game with a late goal. The games against Fenerbahçe and Antalyaspor were the only games during the tour to be played in Asia.

The total amount raised from the Turkish section of the tour was ₴5.5 million+ (€170k+). ₴5 million (€155k) was raised from the Fenerbahçe game, and ₴500k (€16k) from the Antalyaspor game. The money raised from the Galatasaray game was announced with the amount also raised from the Cluj match, with neither matches fundraising amounts being released individually.

=== Romania ===
The tour visiting Romania was meant to see Dynamo Kyiv playing FCSB on 20 April 2022. However, on 14 April Dynamo cancelled the planned game with FCSB after comments and accusations made by the club's owner, Gigi Becali, on Volodymyr Zelenskyy, the Azov Battalion, and the supposed role of billionaires on Zelenskyy winning the presidential election. Dynamo stated that the FCSB owners comments were inadmissible, and that while Dynamo appreciated the efforts of the club with helping to organise training facilities and the teams stay in Romania, Dynamo no longer saw a friendly with the club as feasible. Dynamo announced in the same statement that the tour in Romania would instead see the club facing the Romanian champions CFR Cluj on 20 April.

Before the Dynamo game with Cluj, it was announced that like the Legia game, this game would also be partnered up into being a concert with songs before and after the game, as well as at half time. The line-up for the concert was similar to that of the concert at the Legia game, with Julia Sanina, Kateryna Pavlenko, and Dorofeeva all returning, with Tina Karol being replaced by Ruslana. The pre-match concert saw 200 Ukrainian refugees on the stage on the pitch with Ruslana while she performed her song. The game itself was filled with many chances for both sides, however neither side could find the opening goal with the game finishing 0–0, the first draw in the tour, and the first time a game finished goalless on the tour.

As mentioned above, the Galatasaray and Cluj fundraising amounts were announced together. Jointly, both games raised ₴1.1 million (€35k).

=== Germany ===
The tour arrived in Germany for its eighth game, with Dynamo's fourth game of the tour coming against Borussia Dortmund. The game with Borussia was one of the first games of the tour to be organised, leading to the possibility of greater planning and fundraising efforts for the game. Due to the size of the club, and the global reach the club holds, this game was the biggest yet to be held on the tour, with Kyiv mayor Vitali Klitschko thanking "BVB and everyone who made this game possible". Fund raising efforts took place before the match, with Borussia selling blue and yellow wristbands with all of the proceeds being donated to charity. In total the game with Borussia raised over €400,000 for Ukrainian refugees, with the possibility of the final amount that is to be donated being higher. The game itself started at a fast pace. Borussia were without many of their first team players, but still featuring big names such as Emre Can, Marco Reus, and Erling Haaland, took the lead after 4 minutes when Haaland assisted Jamie Bynoe-Gittens. Dynamo, who were starting the game with 11 Ukrainian internationals, quickly found themselves back in the game after levelling on 9 minutes. Dynamo turned the game around, taking the lead only two minutes later, and had the chance to extend their lead further with a penalty which was ultimately saved by the Dortmund goalkeeper. While both teams continued to attack and ultimately score goals, Dynamo secured their third victory of the tour with a 3–2 win over the German footballing giants.

The amount raised from the Borussia game was ₴12.8 million (€400k).

=== Croatia ===
After Dynamo's game in Germany, both teams travelled to Croatia for a double header on the tour, with Dynamo playing Dinamo Zagreb on 28 April 2022 with Shakhtar playing 3 days later on 1 May 2022 against Hajduk Split.

Before the Dynamo game against their namesake, Dinamo, the Croatian club announced that it would releasing a special shirt with a limited run of 1000 to be sold to fans with all of the profits going towards the humanitarian effort that the tour is supporting. Due to Dinamo still being involved in a title fight in their domestic league, the Zagreb side was composed of first team players as well as players from the Dinamo Zagreb II team. Dynamo Kyiv started the game strongly scoring two goals in the opening 20 minutes, however the first half was to be high scoring with Dinamo Zagreb equalising on the 38th minute, with the first half ending 2–2. Despite the strong start from both teams, neither side was able to find the net in the second half, with the game finishing 2–2 and ensuring that Dynamo went unbeaten in their opening 5 games of the tour.

Before the Shakhtar game with Hajduk Split, the Croatian club gave the chance for Ukrainian children who fled Ukraine to the city of Split a tour of the club's facilities as well as tickets to the game. Hajduk also announced that the match worn shirts were to be auctioned off after the game to raise funds for the charity. The Shakhtar came onto the pitch wearing shirts with "SAVE MARIUPOL" and "WE AZOVSTAL" (We are Azovstal) written on the front in reference to the long lasting siege of Mariupol, which had lasted 66 days at the time of the game. Viktor Korniyenko joined the Shakhtar team for the first time on the tour, having taken part in the territorial defence of Poltava region. Once the game started, Shakthar found themselves on the backfoot, with Hajduk starting strongly. Hajduk led 1–0 at the break, taking a 2–0 lead shortly after. Shakhtar eventually levelled after the goal from Petro Stasyuk, one of the few Mariupol players who were playing with Shakhtar on the tour. After one more goal for each side, the teams ended the game level at 3–3, Shakhtars first draw on the tour, and the highest scoring game in the tour.

The total amount raised from the Croatian section of the tour was ₴3.1 million (€101k). ₴1.1 million (€35k) was raised from the Dinamo game, and ₴2 million (€66k) from the Hajduk game.

=== Switzerland ===
Before Dynamo's match with Borussia Dortmund it was announced that the club were to play Swiss side FC Basel. While the match was to include the usual concert which has supported the charity matches, the game with Basel saw the introduction of the first non-Ukrainian singer taking part in the concerts, with Swiss singer Baschi singing during the match's half-time break. While all of the previous games provided free tickets to Ukrainian nationals, for this game all tickets were free, with the fans in attendance choosing themselves if they wanted to donate, or how much they would like to donate. FC Basel also worked alongside a Michelin starred chef and 10 local chefs to host a charity dinner before the game for high donating attendees.

As was becoming common for games involving Dynamo, both teams started at a fast pace, with Basel having many opportunities early in the match. Dynamo scored the opener on the 23rd minute, with Basel getting an equaliser just before the half-time. Basel took the lead in the second half, giving Dynamo the threat of them possibly losing their first game of the tour. Dynamo responded late in the game, scoring two goals in three minutes to turn the game around and hold the lead to the final whistle, and remaining unbeaten in their opening 6 games on the tour.

The total amount raised from the Swiss section of the tour was ₴3 million (€97k).

=== Estonia ===
11 players of the Dynamo squad left to join the Ukraine national team after their game with FC Basel, with Dynamo II players filling in for the outgoing internationals. The hybrid Dynamo squad were to play in a former USSR country for the first time on the tour when it was announced that the club would be playing in Estonia against FC Flora Tallinn, the current leaders of the Meistriliiga, and 13 times Estonian champions. The match with Flora featured the largest number of Ukrainian singers taking part in the match concert, with 7 artists being involved, and the most for a game since Dynamo's tour kicked off against Legia, when 5 groups/performers were involved.

Despite the Dynamo squad missing the majority of the key players, the game proved to be an easy contest, with Dynamo taking an early lead, and controlling the game 2–0 at half time. Flora posed a few threats throughout the game, but were unable to find a breakthrough. Dynamo's quality was clear to see with the team securing an easy 3–0 win, and the biggest win of the tour.

The total amount raised from the Estonian section of the tour was ₴569k (€18k).

== Ukraine national team tour ==
In early April it was announced that Ukraine national team manager Oleksandr Petrakov wanted to prepare a training camp so that the team would be fully prepared for their World Cup qualifier against Scotland, the potential qualifying match for the World Cup with Wales if the first game was won and the three Nations League matches against Republic of Ireland (x2) and Armenia. The month-long training camp was organised due to the suspension of the Ukrainian football league and that many of the national team's players would not have the match fitness needed to play competitively in the international games. While Shakhtar agreed to stop their tour during the duration of the training camp and the international games, there was resistance on the idea from Dynamo's board and their manager Mircea Lucescu, stating that he believed the national team would be better suited if the Dynamo players continued their tour and joined later on during the training camp. The Dynamo board and management relented and agreed that the Dynamo national team players would go to the training camp and that the Dynamo tour would continue with the players that remained.

The training camp was based at the National Football Centre in Brdo, Slovenia, with the Shakhtar players joining the camp on 1 May after their game with Hajduk Split and Dynamo players joining on 4 May after their game against FC Basel. Due to the camp being started while most European leagues were finishing their domestic leagues, the 25 players joining the camp in early May were all players who played in the Ukrainian league. The 25 players included 1 player each from Vorskla Poltava and Zorya Luhansk, 3 SC Dnipro-1 players, 9 Shakhtar Donetsk players and 11 Dyanmo Kyiv players.

The Ukraine national team also scheduled their own games to be played as part of preparation for the upcoming game against Scotland and like the Dynamo and Shakhtar games, all of the proceeds for these games will also be going to charity. While although these games were friendlies and involved the Ukraine national team, because the games were not sanctioned as official friendlies by UEFA any player representing Ukraine on the tour did not receive an official cap. Ukraine's first game was to be held on 11 May, playing against German club Borussia Mönchengladbach. The day before Ukraine's friendly with Mönchengladbach they announced their second friendly match, being hosted by Croatian club HNK Rijeka. This meant that Croatia would be the first country to host charity games for Dynamo, Shakhtar and the national team. On the day of their first game, Ukraine also announced a friendly with Italian side Empoli, to take place the day before their Rijeka match.

On 13 May, Petrakov released a list announcing the names of those Ukrainian players who play in international leagues who would be joining the training camp. Depending on when their teams finished their domestic leagues dictated when the players would be joining the camp. The first to join were Roman Yaremchuk (Benfica), Danylo Sikan (Hansa Rostock), Taras Kacharaba (Slavia Prague) and Oleksandr Zubkov (Ferencvárosi), who all joined on 16 May and were available for the games against Empoli and Rijeka. Due to some leagues finishing later than others, Vitaliy Mykolenko (Everton), Eduard Sobol (Club Brugge), Andriy Yarmolenko (West Ham United), Oleksandr Zinchenko (Manchester City) and Ruslan Malinovskyi (Atalanta) were unable to join the national team until 23 May. The final player called up, Andriy Lunin (Real Madrid), was unable to join the team until after 28 May due to Real Madrid's appearance in the Champions League Final and would not have the possibility to feature for Ukraine in their charity games.

=== Germany ===
Ukraine's first game since the Russian invasion was with Borussia Mönchengladbach. Due to the squad being composed of only players from the Ukrainian league, many of the players were making their debuts for the national team. Both teams were competitive throughout the game, with early goals from both sides made it 1–1 after 15 minutes. The chances continued for both sides, but with both teams struggling to find a breakthrough. It wasn't until late into the game after the sides were getting more tired and team changes had been made that Ukraine found the goal they needed to win the game. Ukraine scored their second goal on the 82nd minute to secure victory for visitors. Both goalscorers for Ukraine, Mykhailo Mudryk and Oleksandr Pikhalyonok, were representing Ukraine for the first time.

=== Italy ===
The Ukraine squad was bolstered by additional players whose clubs domestic seasons had finished after the nations game with Borussia. The match with Empoli was to start the back-to-back games organised by Ukraine, with the national team playing twice in two days. Empoli started the stronger of the two sides, but it was Ukraine who scored the first goal, with the seasoned international player Roman Yaremchuk opening the scoring on the 26th minute. The teams were level going into half time after a defensive mix-up allowed Empoli to equalise in stoppage time. Ukraine scored early in the second half, with Oleksandr Karavayev scoring his first goal while representing Ukraine, with Oleksandr Pikhalyonok scoring the third goal minutes later. This would prove to be the winning goal, as although both teams continued to have chances, neither side could find the back of the net late into the match.

=== Croatia ===
The national team travelled to Croatia for their second game of their double header, this time with HNK Rijeka hosting the Ukrainian side. The whole of the starting 11 was changed for this game, giving an opportunity for maximum match preparation for each of the squads players. Ukraine was the stronger of the two teams starting the match, scoring their opening goal from a deflected shot that gave the goalkeeper no chance of saving. Rijeka grew into the game after conceding and levelled the game before half time. Ukraine scored early in the second half, however the goal was flagged for offside. The game slowed down later into the game and finished without any second half goals. After three games in Croatia, each of the Ukrainian sides had proved to be unable to find a win in any of their games, with each game finishing as a score draw.

=== Final qualification preparations ===
Ukraine tried to organise friendlies for the 22, 23 or 26 May, but for a variety of reasons none of the offers progressed to an actual match. Ukraine had offers to play against DR Congo, however the DRC national team withdrew for unknown reasons, Lithuania, but Ukraine did not want to risk injury by playing on an artificial pitch, two teams from the Spanish Segunda División, but the hot weather and distance to travel was felt it would be too much, Malta, but the game would have been on the 28th or 29th and left too little time to recover for the games against Scotland Venezuela, but Venezuela were unable to meet the requirements that Ukraine wanted in a friendly. Ukraine therefore decided on staying at their training base in Slovenia and having inter-team matches to finish off their preparations. Despite initially trying to organise four or five charity matches, Ukraine finished its tour having played three times.

=== World Cup qualifiers & UEFA Nations League ===
As previously stated, with the Ukrainian league being cancelled and the qualifying game with Scotland being delayed from 24 March to 1 June, both due to the Russian invasion of Ukraine, part of the tour's objective was to ensure the Ukrainian players were fit enough to be competitive for the qualifiers. The preparation of the tour proved to have been important as the starting 11 to play against Scotland featured 7 players of Dynamo and Shakhtar, each player featuring during their teams respective tours prior to joining the Ukraine set-up and players who without the tour would have spent months without playing a competitive game of football. The team as a whole started strongly and were dangerous throughout, however they relied on those playing abroad to score their goals, with Ukraine's first 2 goals coming from English-based Yarmolenko and Portuguese-based Yaremchuk. Despite a late goal from Scotland, Ukraine held off for a convincing 3–1 win and progressed to a final qualifying match on 5 June against Wales. Despite Ukraine performing strongly in the game with Wales and having more possession and shots throughout the match, it proved to be one game too many for the Ukrainians. Wales progressed to the World Cup after scoring from an own goal due to a deflected Gareth Bale free kick, with the game finishing 1–0 to Wales.

Ukraine also performed well in the UEFA Nations League, winning their opening two games against Ireland and Armenia and drawing their third game with Ireland, with Ukraine being top of their group midway through the tournament. In the five competitive games Ukraine played, they won three, drew once and lost once.

== Pausing the tour ==
After the Ukraine national team games had finished, the aims of raising money and providing the national team with players who were able to compete had been completed. While the players of Dynamo Kyiv and Shakhtar Donetsk had taken their breaks during the international games, the national team players needed a break themselves before the start of the season, especially those playing in foreign leagues as the resumption of most leagues was to start earlier than usual due to the 2022 World Cup taking place during the winter instead of its usual time during the summer.

On 27 May, representatives of the Ukrainian football association and each of the 16 clubs who played in the Premier League before the cancellation of the 2021–22 season, all voted unanimously to restart the Premier League in August. With the announcement that the Ukrainian league was to resume and with Ukrainian clubs taking part in European competitions, it highlighted a need for a normal preseason with the ability for teams and players to get match ready and to be competitive, especially as no Ukrainian club side had played a competitive match since December 2021. While not every Ukrainian side will have gone on tour to raise money for humanitarian efforts, those that have are listed below.

== Teams (phase two) ==
Locations of the teams involved in the Global Tour for Peace. The short names of the clubs have been used.

Legend

- Played against Dynamo
- Location of Dynamo match (note 1)
- Played against Shakhtar
- Location of Shakhtar match (note 2)
- Multiple matches in these locations. See maps below.

Note 1: When the marker is purple it highlights a city that Dynamo played in that was different to where the opponents they were playing against were from (eg. Dynamo played Lyon in Bourgoin-Jallieu)

Note 2: When the marker is brown it highlights a city that Shakhtar played in that was different to where the opponents they were playing against were from (eg. Shakhtar played 3 games in Brdo, Slovenia, against non-Slovenian opponents)
Location of the teams on Dynamo's Swiss tour. Sion played in Savièse and Young Boys played in Fribourg.
Teams from the Benelux region that played in the tour
Teams and locations played, in Slovenia. Al-Adalah and Al-Fateh both played at Brdo.
Teams from Saudi Arabia that played in the tour. Both teams played in Brdo, Slovenia.

Date	Team	Nat.	Stadium	Capacity
(Ukraine) FC Dynamo Kyiv
"Match for Peace! Stop the War!"
26 June 2022	Yverdon-Sport	(Switzerland)	Stade Municipal	6,600
29 June 2022	Lausanne-Sport	(Switzerland)	Stade de la Tuilière	12,544
2 July 2022	FC Sion	(Switzerland)	Stade Tourbillon (Note: Stade Tourbillon is FC Sion's football stadium, however the Stadia used for the game with Dynamo is the stadium used by FC Savièse, and FC Sion's U21 team, Stade St-Germain, Savièse (capacity: 1,100))	14,283
5 July 2022	BSC Young Boys	(Switzerland)	Stadion Wankdorf (Note: Stadion Wankdorf is Young Boys' football stadium, however the Stadia used for the game with Dynamo is the stadium used by FC Fribourg, Stade Universitaire Saint-Léonard, Fribourg (capacity: 9,000))	32,000
9 July 2022	FC Luzern	(Switzerland)	Swissporarena	17,000
12 July 2022	Olympique Lyonnais (x2)	(France)	Parc Olympique Lyonnais (Note: Parc Olympique Lyonnais is Olympique Lyonnais's football stadium, however the Stadia used for both games with Dynamo is the stadium used by FC Bourgoin-Jallieu, Stade Pierre Rajon, Bourgoin-Jallieu (capacity: 9,441))	56,186
15 July 2022	Royal Antwerp	(Belgium)	Bosuilstadion	16,144
29 July 2022	Everton	(England)	Goodison Park	39,414
(Ukraine) FC Shakhtar Donetsk
"Shakhtar Global Tour for Peace"
22 July 2022	Fortuna Sittard	(Netherlands)	Fortuna Sittard Stadion	12,500
26 July 2022	AFC Ajax	(Netherlands)	Johan Cruyff Arena	56,120
30 July 2022	FC Utrecht	(Netherlands)	Stadion Galgenwaard	23,750
7 August 2022	A.S. Roma	(Italy)	Stadio Olimpico	70,634
10 August 2022	Al-Adalah FC	(Saudi Arabia)	Prince Abdullah bin Jalawi Stadium (Note: Prince Abdullah bin Jalawi Stadium is Al-Adalah's and Al-Fateh's football stadium, however the Stadia used for their games with Shakhtar is the National Football Center Brdo, Brdo, Slovenia)	26,000
10 August 2022	NK Domžale	(Slovenia)	Domžale Sports Park	3,100
15 August 2022	Al Fateh SC (x2)	(Saudi Arabia)	Prince Abdullah bin Jalawi Stadium	26,000

== Second tour background ==
Although the Ukrainian Premier League had been cancelled for the 2021–22 season, Ukraine were still given their 5 spaces to compete in the European club competitions. As the league was unable to finish and there were no final standings the Ukrainian Football Association decided that the teams who would represent Ukraine on the European stage would be those who were in the top 5 when the season was paused and later cancelled. The top five teams, by their standings in the league, were; 1. Shakhtar Donetsk, 2. Dynamo Kyiv, 3. Dnipro-1, 4. Zorya Luhansk, and 5. Vorskla Poltava. Dynamo Kyiv and Shakhtar Donetsk were to progress into UEFA Champions League, with Shakhtar progressing straight to the Group Stage, and Dynamo entering at the Second qualifying round. SC Dnipro-1 were to play in the UEFA Europa League and were to enter at the play-off round, while Zorya Luhansk and Vorskla Poltava were to play in the UEFA Europa Conference League, with Zorya entering in the third qualifying round and Vorskla entering in the second qualifying round.

The first matches of the 4 teams who had to qualify for their respective European competitions were; Dynamo Kyiv have been drawn against Fenerbahçe (Home; 20 July, Away; 27 July). Dynamo Kyiv are to play their European matches at Stadion Miejski im. Władysława Króla, the stadium of ŁKS Łódź in Łódź, Poland. Dnipro-1 has yet to be drawn their opponents, this will be drawn on 2 August (matches; 18 & 25 August). Zorya Luhansk also don't yet know their opponent, the draw will be made on 18 July (matches; 4 & 11 August). Vorskla Poltava have been drawn against AIK (Home; 21 July, Away; 28 July). After the draw was announced Vorskla proposed to UEFA to play both games in Stockholm, Sweden, with AIK playing in their usual stadium, Friends Arena, and Vorskla playing at the Tele2 Arena.

Due to the differing dates in when their seasons start, Dynamo was the first club to announce the continuation of their tour, announcing 8 games to be played between 26 June and 12 July. Shakhtar announced their first game of the second phase of the tour to be played on 26 July.

=== Dnipro, Zorya & Vorskla tours ===
The three other Ukrainian teams also went on pre-season tours for their respective European campaigns. Dnipro based themselves in Slovenia and faced four teams during their training camp, playing Slovenian lower league side NK Čarda (won, 14–0), Cypriot side Aris Limassol (lost, 2–4), Israeli side Beitar Jerusalem (drew, 1–1), Saudi Arabian side Al Nassr (drew, 0–0), Croatian lower league side NK Polet Sveti Martin na Muri (won, 2–0), Slovenian second division side ND Beltinci (won, 3–0), Emirati side Sharjah FC (drew, 1–1), and Croatian side NK Varaždin (drew, 3–3).

Both Zorya and Vorskla based themselves in Poland. Zorya played Polish sides Legia Warsaw (lost, 2–1), Legionovia Legionowo (won, 4–1), Korona Kielce (won, 4–1), and Wisła Płock (won, 3–2). Zorya then played the Ukrainian team, Polissya Zhytomyr (won, 5–3). Zorya returned to playing Polish opposition with a combined match against KS Błonianka Błonie and Hutnik Warsaw, where Zorya played each team for 45 minutes in a 90-minute match (won, 3–1, 4–0, agg. 7–1), before finishing off their pre-season preparations against KS Raszyn (won, 10–0). Vorsklas tour saw them playing Górnik Zabrze (lost, 2–1), and played Radomiak Radom twice (lost, 2–1, & won, 2–1). After being knocked out of the European Conference League Vorskla returned to Ukraine to prepare for the start of the Ukrainian Premier League where they played against Kryvbas Kryvyi Rih (won, 3–2).

Although these three teams have gone on tours outside of Ukraine, the games played have not been with the aim of raising money for charity, and thus are not part of the Peace Tour.

== Dynamo tour ==
Dynamo's season was to start on 20 July with their game against Fenerbahçe, meaning an early start to their preseason preparations. The team had returned to Ukraine and to their training complex in Kyiv to start their seasons preparations at the Dynamo Training Center. The club did not stay in their home training complex for long, spending five days in Kyiv, heading to Bucharest, Romania, for two days, before finally heading off to Switzerland.

=== Switzerland ===
The second phase of the tour started with Dynamo Kyiv in Switzerland. Before the first game of the tour restarting Dynamo had announced they would be starting their Swiss tour against Yverdon-Sport FC, and would also be playing Lausanne-Sport, FC Sion, BSC Young Boys, and FC Luzern.

Dynamo's Swiss tour started against two second division teams, Yverdon-Sport and Lausanne-Sport. The game against Yverdon was 39 days after Dynamo's last match on the tour, and 36 days since the tour took its break. The match started in typical Dynamo style, with a fast-paced start and an early goal. Dynamo however struggled after their confident start, with Yverdon having the better chances towards the end of the first half, however were unable to find an equaliser. Yverden were again the better team after the break, eventually getting an equaliser midway through the half before the match slowed down to a 1–1 draw.

The match against Lausanne saw Dynamo players wearing t-shirts reading "Pray for Kremenchuk" after a shopping mall in the city of Kremenchuk was struck by a missile, leaving at least 20 dead. The game itself saw Dynamo conceding after only 5 mins. Dynamo grew into the game, becoming stronger and having numerous attacks, but were unable to take their chances. Lausanne player Trae Coyle scored two goals, not taking his chance late on to score the tours first hat-trick. The high number of missed opportunities for Dynamo saw Lausanne securing a 2–0 win, and inflicting Dynamo's first defeat since the charity tour began.

After the games against Yverdon-Sport and Lausanne-Sport, Dynamo's next Swiss opposition all came from the Swiss Super League, Switzerland's top division. The first of which would be against FC Sion. Throughout the match Sion struggled offensively, losing one of their key players during the transfer window. Dynamos Vladyslav Vanat opened the scoring in the first half, scoring his 6th goal on the tour, and going 3 goals clear of the next player. The game however fizzled out with neither side offering much in the second half, and the game finishing 1–0 to Dynamo.

Dyanmo's next Swiss Super League opponents were BSC Young Boys. The match started in a slower pace than usual, with both sides struggling to make goalscoring chances other than through set pieces. Later into the first half both sides started to open up more, with Dynamo having the clearest goalscoring chance, which was saved by the Young Boys goalkeeper. The second half started in the same way as the first, with Dynamo having to sit deeper and defend more, but with both teams opening up as the half went on. Despite opportunities for both teams, the game finished as a scoreless 0–0 draw.

The final Swiss opposition for Dynamo was FC Luzern. Dynamo had a virtually unchanged starting eleven to the team that faced Young Boys. In contrast to the previous game, it was Dynamo who was the more confident in possession, with Luzern relying on counterattacks. On the 16th minute Dynamo scored the opener from the penalty spot after the Luzern goalkeeper had fouled in the box, with Dynamo taking a commanding 2–0 lead after the 24th minute. In the second half Luzern started more attacking, causing the Dynamo defence more problems. The Dynamo defence managed to weather the Luzern attacks until a defensive mistake gifted Luzern an opportunity late on to score themselves, with the match finishing 2–1 to Dynamo. The Swiss section of Dynamo's tour saw them taking 2 wins, 2 draws, and 1 defeat in their 5 games.

=== France & Belgium ===
After their games in Switzerland, Dynamo prepared for a double header against their French opponents Olympique Lyonnais. In the first of the games, both teams started the game well, with Dynamo having an early chance to score from a penalty. The penalty hit the post, however Dynamo scored the opener not long after a goal from Denys Antyukh, sending Dynamo into the break with a lead. After half-time both teams pushed for the game's second goal, with Dynamo doubling their lead in the 57th minute. Lyon hit back almost instantly with a 60th-minute goal, but were unable to bring the game level. Dynamo scored late on to guarantee the win in the first game.

The second game was the complete opposite of the first. Despite heading into half-time level at 0–0, Lyon dominated the second half, winning the game easily with a score of 3–0.

On the back of a tiring double header, Dynamo had 3 days rest before their next match against Royal Antwerp. This was their last game before starting their European campaign against Fenerbahçe S.K. The game was not ideal preparation for Dynamo as they were behind early in the game, but found a leveller before half-time. Antwerp extended their lead again midway through the second half, leading to Dynamo starting their season on the back of two defeats.

=== England ===
Dynamo's final tour game before fully focusing on the season ahead saw the team playing against Premier League team Everton. Vitalii Mykolenko, who joined Everton from Dynamo Kyiv in the transfer window before Russia's invasion of Ukraine, was an important figure in with the tour coming to England and Everton being the opposition. In the match Everton took an early lead, with Dominic Calvert-Lewin opening the scoring in the 4th minute. Dynamo showed threats throughout the match, but after failing to capitalise on their dominant periods two second half goals from Dwight McNeil saw Everton taking a convincing 3–0 lead. While the official score line was 3–0, Paul Stratton, a 44 year old Everton fan who helped Ukrainian refugees at the outbreak of the war, entered for Dele Alli toward the end of the game and scored a penalty.

== Shakhtar tour ==
With Shakhtar having already qualified for European football their preseason was able to start much later than Dynamo's. Shakhtar started training 14 July, with plans to start their second tour a week later playing 3 Dutch opponents and basing themselves in Rotterdam for a training camp until 30 July.

== Matches ==
The games played by Dynamo, Shakhtar and Ukraine during their tour.

Ukrainian team win Draw Ukrainian team loss

Phase one

9 April 2022	Olympiacos (Greece)	1–0	(Ukraine) Shakhtar Donetsk	Athens, Greece
EEST (UTC+3)	Tiquinho 22'	Report		Stadium: Karaiskakis Stadium; Attendance: 5,000

12 April 2022	Legia Warsaw (Poland)	1–3	(Ukraine) Dynamo Kyiv	Warsaw, Poland
20:30 CEST (UTC+2)	Strzałek 54'	Report	Buyalskyi 4'; Besedin 56', 71'	Stadium: Stadion Wojska Polskiego; Attendance: 20,000

14 April 2022	Galatasaray (Turkey)	1–3	(Ukraine) Dynamo Kyiv	Istanbul, Turkey
16:00 TRT (UTC+3)	Barış 56'	Report	Buyalskyi 14'; Besedin 28'; Tsyhankov 80'	Stadium: Nef Stadium; Attendance: 6,726

14 April 2022	Lechia Gdańsk (Poland)	2–3	(Ukraine) Shakhtar Donetsk	Gdańsk, Poland
19:30 CEST (UTC+2)	Diabaté 12'; Okoniewski 90+2'		Mudryk 7', 58'; Keda 90+4'	Stadium: Polsat Plus Arena Gdańsk; Attendance: 12,620

19 April 2022	Fenerbahçe (Turkey)	1–0	(Ukraine) Shakhtar Donetsk	Istanbul, Turkey
16:00 TRT (UTC+3)	Valencia 26'			Stadium: Şükrü Saracoğlu Stadium; Attendance: 11,781

20 April 2022	CFR Cluj (Romania)	0–0	(Ukraine) Dynamo Kyiv	Cluj-Napoca, Romania
21:30 CEST (UTC+2)				Stadium: Stadionul Dr. Constantin Rădulescu; Attendance: 5,000

25 April 2022	Antalyaspor (Turkey)	1–2	(Ukraine) Shakhtar Donetsk	Antalya, Turkey
20:30 TRT (UTC+3)	Erdilman 9'		Solomon 21'; Topalov 76'	Stadium: Antalya Stadium; Attendance: 4,500

26 April 2022	Borussia Dortmund (Germany)	2–3	(Ukraine) Dynamo Kyiv	Dortmund, Germany
18:00 CEST (UTC+2)	Bynoe-Gittens 4'; Rothe 65'		Buyalskyi 9'; Vanat 11', 35'	Stadium: Westfalenstadion; Attendance: 35,000; Referee: Denys Shurman

28 April 2022	Dinamo Zagreb (Croatia)	2–2	(Ukraine) Dynamo Kyiv	Zagreb, Croatia
19:00 CEST (UTC+2)	Vukotić 29'; Menalo 38'		Vanat 8', 16'	Stadium: Stadion Maksimir; Attendance: 4,909

1 May 2022	Hajduk Split (Croatia)	3–3	(Ukraine) Shakhtar Donetsk	Split, Croatia
15:00 CEST (UTC+2)	Marin Ljubičić 10', 80'; Franjo Lazar 49'		Dmytro Topalov 59'; Petro Stasyuk 74'; Andriy Boryachuk 90'	Stadium: Stadion Poljud; Attendance: 6,500

4 May 2022	FC Basel (Switzerland)	2–3	(Ukraine) Dynamo Kyiv	Basel, Switzerland
19:00 CEST (UTC+2)	Szalai 43'; Esposito 61'	FC Dynamo summary FCB report	Karavayev 23'; Andriyevskyi 78'; Popov 81'	Stadium: St. Jakob-Park; Attendance: 15,391; Referee: (Switzerland) Esther Staubli

11 May 2022	Borussia Mönchengladbach (Germany)	1–2	Ukraine	Mönchengladbach, Germany
20:45 CEST (UTC+2)	Noß 14'		Mudryk 9'; Pikhalyonok 82'	Stadium: Borussia-Park; Attendance: 20,223

13 May 2022	FC Flora (Estonia)	0–3	(Ukraine) Dynamo Kyiv	Tallinn, Estonia
19:00 EEST (UTC+3)			V. Voloshyn 16'; Burda 42'; Vanat 60'	Stadium: A. Le Coq Arena; Attendance: 4,550

17 May 2022	Empoli (Italy)	1–3	Ukraine	Empoli, Italy
20:30 CEST (UTC+2)	La Mantia 45'		Yaremchuk 26'; Karavayev 46'; Pikhalyonok 53'	Stadium: Stadio Carlo Castellani

18 May 2022	HNK Rijeka (Croatia)	1–1	Ukraine	Rijeka, Croatia
18:00 CEST (UTC+2)	Drmić 36'		Garmash 23'	Stadium: Stadion HNK Rijeka; Attendance: 2,200

Phase two

26 June 2022	Yverdon-Sport (Switzerland)	1–1	(Ukraine) Dynamo Kyiv	Yverdon-les-Bains, Switzerland
16:00 CEST (UTC+2)	Beyer 71'		Yatsyk 14'	Stadium: Stade Municipal; Attendance: 800

29 June 2022	Lausanne-Sport (Switzerland)	2–0	(Ukraine) Dynamo Kyiv	Lausanne, Switzerland
20:00 CEST (UTC+2)	Trae Coyle 5', 44'			Stadium: Stade de la Tuilière; Attendance: 4,050

2 July 2022	FC Sion (Switzerland)	0–1	(Ukraine) Dynamo Kyiv	Savièse, Switzerland
18:00 CEST (UTC+2)			Vanat 35'	Stadium: Stade St-Germain; Attendance: 800

5 July 2022	BSC Young Boys (Switzerland)	0–0	(Ukraine) Dynamo Kyiv	Fribourg, Switzerland
20:00 CEST (UTC+2)				Stadium: Stade Universitaire Saint-Léonard; Attendance: 3,000

9 July 2022	FC Luzern (Switzerland)	1–2	(Ukraine) Dynamo Kyiv	Lucerne, Switzerland
18:00 CEST (UTC+2)	Emini 81'		Tsyhankov 16' (pen.); Verbič 24'	Stadium: Swissporarena

12 July 2022	Olympique Lyonnais (France)	1–3	(Ukraine) Dynamo Kyiv	Bourgoin-Jallieu, France
18:00 CEST (UTC+2)	El Arouch 60'		Antyukh 28'; Supryaha 57'; Voloshyn 86'	Stadium: Stade Pierre Rajon

12 July 2022	Olympique Lyonnais (France)	3–0	(Ukraine) Dynamo Kyiv	Bourgoin-Jallieu, France
21:00 CEST (UTC+2)	Lukeba 52'; Boueye 73'; Lega 76'			Stadium: Stade Pierre Rajon

15 July 2022	Royal Antwerp (Belgium)	2–1	(Ukraine) Dynamo Kyiv	Antwerp, Belgium
20:00 CEST (UTC+2)	Janssen 7'; Benson 70'		Tsyhankov 40'	Stadium: Bosuilstadion

22 July 2022	Fortuna Sittard (Netherlands)	3–3	(Ukraine) Shakhtar Donetsk	Sittard, Netherlands
CEST (UTC+2)	Noslin 11', 69'; Seuntjens 14'		Sikan 35'; Stepanenko 45'; Ocheretko 65'	Stadium: Fortuna Sittard Stadion

26 July 2022	AFC Ajax (Netherlands)	3–1	(Ukraine) Shakhtar Donetsk	Amsterdam, Netherlands
CEST (UTC+2)	Tadić 45'; Berghuis 73'; Kudus 85'		Mudryk 33'	Stadium: Johan Cruyff Arena

29 July 2022	Everton (England)	3–0	(Ukraine) Dynamo Kyiv	Liverpool, England
19:45 BST (UTC+1)	Calvert-Lewin 4'; McNeil 73', 78'			Stadium: Goodison Park

30 July 2022	FC Utrecht (Netherlands)	2–2	(Ukraine) Shakhtar Donetsk	Utrecht, Netherlands
16:30 CEST (UTC+2)	Redan 7'; Kryvtsov 65' (o.g.)		Bondarenko 41'; Kryskiv 47'	Stadium: Stadion Galgenwaard

7 August 2022	A.S. Roma (Italy)	5–0	(Ukraine) Shakhtar Donetsk	Rome, Italy
20:45 CEST (UTC+2)	Pellegrini 19'; Gianluca Mancini 41'; Konoplya 45+1' (o.g.); Zaniolo 59'; Bove 87'			Stadium: Stadio Olimpico

10 August 2022	Al-Adalah FC (Saudi Arabia)	0–1	(Ukraine) Shakhtar Donetsk	Brdo, Slovenia
11:00 CEST (UTC+2)			Al-Jamaan 42' (o.g.)	Stadium: National Football Center Brdo

10 August 2022	NK Domžale (Slovenia)	0–3	(Ukraine) Shakhtar Donetsk	Domžale, Slovenia
19:00 CEST (UTC+2)			Mudryk 11', 32'; Topalov 34'	Stadium: Domžale Sports Park

15 August 2022	Al Fateh SC (Saudi Arabia)	0–5	(Ukraine) Shakhtar Donetsk	Brdo, Slovenia
11:00 CEST (UTC+2)			Sikan 7', 37'; Vakula 24'; Kryvtsov 34'; Traoré 80'	Stadium: National Football Center Brdo

15 August 2022	Al Fateh SC (Saudi Arabia)	3–1	(Ukraine) Shakhtar Donetsk	Brdo, Slovenia
18:00 CEST (UTC+2)	Cueva 38'; Al-Harbi 80'; Valera 80+2'		Mudryk 29'	Stadium: National Football Center Brdo

== Fundraising ==
The main fundraising events are the football games themselves, however other fundraisers or initiatives have helped to either increase money by other donations, or to help people attend the game.

Often, each club organised their own method of fundraising that was different to the money raised through ticket sales, while in other cases fans of the club donated goods during the match to help those who have been displaced during the war. While many games featured a food collection, fans of Olympiacos left 176 toys on seats inside the stadium to be donated to Ukrainian children, 176 being the same number of children who had died in the conflict up to that point. A method used my Dynamo to help ticket sales was to include live music in most of their matches, with three of the six games featuring live music (Legia, CFR Cluj, & FC Flora) having at least six songs sung by Ukrainian singers. While every fan in attendance with a Ukrainian passport was able to watch every game for free, the Fundacja Gdańska set up an initiative where fans could still pay for the tickets of the Ukrainian's who watched the game. This fundraiser raised the equivalent of 6,800zł, which would have been enough to cover the tickets of 680 Ukrainians living in Gdańsk. Borussia Dortmund helped to raise funds by selling wristbands showing support for Ukraine, while Dinamo Zagreb helped to raise funds by selling commemorative scarves, and a limited run of special football shirts. FC Basel offered free entry to every fan in attendance, with each fan donating as much as they wanted for their ticket. Basel also hosted a charity dinner before the match to raise additional funds.

While this does not highlight each and every club's fundraising for charity, it does highlight the support and camaraderie between the host clubs and the visiting Ukrainian teams, and the eagerness to help support displaced Ukrainian refugees.

Information			Fundraising		
Date	Team	Attendance	Hryvnia (₴)	Euro (€)	Refs
9 April 2022	Olympiacos	5,000	₴3.2mil	€102k	
12 April 2022	Legia Warsaw	20,000	₴7mil	€220k	
14 April 2022	Galatasaray	6,726	Note A (Note: Dynamo Kyiv announced that they had raised ₴22mil (€690k) from their 5 games in April. After deducting the amounts raised from the Legia Warsaw, Borussia Dortmund, and Dinamo Zagreb, it would suggest that the Galatasaray and CFR Cluj games jointly raised a total of ₴1.1mil (€35k). Due to the official figures not being released, a figure raised cannot be attached to either club, however the ₴1.1mil and €35k have been added to the total amounts raised at the bottom of the table.)		
14 April 2022	Lechia Gdańsk	12,620	₴2.5mil	€78k	
19 April 2022	Fenerbahçe	11,781	₴5mil	€155k	
20 April 2022	CFR Cluj	5,000	Note A		
25 April 2022	Antalyaspor	4,500	₴500k (Note: Shakhtar Donetsk announced that they had raised ₴13.2mil (€423k) from the 5 games in their tour. The match with Antalyaspor was the only Shakhtar match not to have previously stated how much was raised from the game before the announcement. After deducting the amounts raised from the Olympiacos, Lechia Gdańsk, Fenerbahçe, and Hajduk Split, it would suggest that the Antalyaspor game raised a total of ₴500k (€16k).)	€16k	
26 April 2022	Borussia Dortmund	35,000	₴12.8mil	€400k	
28 April 2022	Dinamo Zagreb	4,909	₴1.1mil	€35k	
1 May 2022	Hajduk Split	6,500	₴2mil	€66k	
4 May 2022	FC Basel	15,391	₴3mil	€97k	
11 May 2022	Borussia Mönchengladbach	20,223	Note C (Note: Ukraine announced that they had raised ₴4,323,827 (€136k) from their games with Borussia and Empoli. Due to the official figures not being released for each club, no monetary amount is shown for either club, but the total amounts raised have been added to the bottom of the table.)		
13 May 2022	FC Flora	4,550	₴569k	€18k	
17 May 2022	Empoli	N.A.	Note C		
18 May 2022	HNK Rijeka	2,200	Note D (Note: Neither Ukraine or HNK Rijeka announced the amount raised from the match.)		
26 June 2022	Yverdon-Sport	800	Note E (Note: The matches involving Dynamo Kyiv and their opponents; Yverdon-Sport, Lausanne-Sport, FC Sion, Young Boys, FC Luzern, Olympique Lyonnais, Royal Antwerp, and Everton, did not have any official puplic announcement as to how much money was raised.)		
29 June 2022	Lausanne-Sport	4,050	Note E		
2 July 2022	FC Sion	800	Note E		
5 July 2022	Young Boys	3,000	Note E		
9 July 2022	FC Luzern	N.A.	Note E		
12 July 2022	Olympique Lyonnais	N.A.	Note E		
15 July 2022	Royal Antwerp	N.A.	Note E		
22 July 2022	Fortuna Sittard	750	Note F (Note: Shakhtar Donetsk announced after the conclusion of their tour that they had raised ₴44mil (€1.2mil) from their 13 games. The amounts raised are known for the games with Olympiacos, Lechia Gdańsk, Fenerbahçe, Antalyaspor, Hajduk Split, AFC Ajax & Roma. These 7 games raised a total of ₴31.6mil, suggesting that the other ₴12.4mil was raised from the games with Fortuna Sittard, FC Utrecht, Al-Adalah FC, NK Domžale, and Al Fateh SC (x2). However the breakdown of figures raised from these games has not been officially released.)		
26 July 2022	AFC Ajax	N.A.	₴5.1mil	€134k	
29 July 2022	Everton	30,000	Note E		
30 July 2022	FC Utrecht	8,511	Note F		
7 August 2022	AS Roma	65,303	₴13.3mil	€350k	
10 August 2022	Al-Adalah FC	N.A.	Note F		
10 August 2022	NK Domžale	N.A.	Note G (Note: NK Domžale announced that due to the match with Shakhtar they were able to raise the funds for 125 food for Ukrainian refugees in Slovenia, however no official figure raised due to the game was announced.)		-
15 August 2022	Al-Fateh SC	N.A.	Note F		
Total		246,094+	₴78.71mil+	€2.188mil+	(Note: Due to the conversion rate fluctuation since the start of the invasion, the figures stated in the Euro section are as accurate as possible to the time of the games being played. Most of the figures released of money raised has been in Hryvnia, and thus this currency is the most accurate figure.)

While the games themselves were not part of the charity tour, the Ukrainian Association of Football helped to raise additional funds through virtual ticket sales of the national teams World Cup qualifiers against Scotland and Wales, and the European Nations League games against Ireland (home and away), and Armenia. The game against Wales for instance helped to raise an additional ₴199k (€6360). In total the five games helped to raise ₴770k (€24784), all of which was transferred to the United24 initiative to help the reconstruction of Ukraine after the war.

Dynamo Kyiv also raised additional funds during their Champions League qualifying rounds, where a QR code shown on TV throughout the matches sent people who scanned the image to a donation page.

=== Aid donations ===
After the war started, a joint project was set up with coordination from Shakhtar Social (a Shakhtar Donetsk nonprofit organisation), European Football for Development Network (EFDN, a Netherlands-based nonprofit organisation), and Fundacja Legii ("Legia Foundation", a Legia Warsaw nonprofit organisation), with Legia Warsaw providing its stadium to work as the logistics hub. By 28 April 2022, 2 months after the outbreak of the war, 9 tons of humanitarian aid had been raised and donated by the EFDN (Netherlands), Fundacja Legii (Legia Warsaw, Poland), Fundação Benfica (Benfica Foundation, Portugal), AFC Wimbledon, Aston Villa, Blackburn Rovers, Chesterfield, Colchester United, Foundation 92 (a Salford City charity), Leicester City (all in England), KAA Gent (Belgium), Heart of Midlothian, Montrose (both Scotland), and Schalke 04 (Germany). The aid provided included mattresses, pillows, blankets, sleeping bags, clothes, food, medicines, water, and baby food.

On 2 June 2022, 20 tons of aid was donated from the money raised through the match with Lechia Gdańsk. The €78k raised in the match helped to pay for the essentials for 800 Ukrainian refugees living in Gdańsk, with the Fundacja Gdańska (Gdańsk Foundation), Polsat Plus Arena Gdańsk, the Ukrainian Consulate in Gdansk, and the local government, helping to prepare the 20 tons of aid and organise delivery of the goods to Shakhtar's Shelter Centre at the Arena Lviv. The aid from Gdańsk included food, beverages, hygiene items, disposable tableware and household appliances. 7 June saw an undisclosed amount of humanitarian aid which was donated by the Israel Football Association.

On 6 July 2022, Shakhtar announced that part of the money raised in their games had gone towards Ukrainian soldiers fighting, with 750 protective helmets for soldiers and 1500 first aid kits being donated to the armed forces.

== Statistics ==
=== Team overview ===
Team	Games	Wins	Draws	Defeats	GF	GA	GD
(Ukraine) Dynamo Kyiv	16	8	4	4	25	22	+3
(Ukraine) Shakhtar Donetsk	13	5	3	5	24	24	0
Ukraine	3	2	1	0	6	3	+3
Total	32	15	8	9	55	49	+6

=== Goalscorers ===
7 goals

- Mykhailo Mudryk (Shakhtar Donetsk/Ukraine)

6 goals

- (Ukraine) Vladyslav Vanat (Dynamo Kyiv)

3 goals

- (Ukraine) Artem Besedin (Dynamo Kyiv)
- (Ukraine) Vitaliy Buyalskyi (Dynamo Kyiv)
- (Ukraine) Dmytro Topalov (Shakhtar Donetsk)
- (Ukraine) Viktor Tsyhankov (Dynamo Kyiv)
- Own Goals

2 goals

- (England) Trae Coyle (Lausanne-Sport)
- Oleksandr Karavayev (Dynamo Kyiv/Ukraine)
- (Croatia) Marin Ljubičić (Hajduk Split)
- (England) Dwight McNeil (Everton)
- (Netherlands) Tijjani Noslin (Fortuna Sittard)
- Oleksandr Pikhalyonok (Ukraine)
- (Ukraine) Danylo Sikan (Shakhtar Donetsk)
- (Ukraine) Vikentiy Voloshyn (Dynamo Kyiv)

1 goal

- (Saudi Arabia) Fahad Al-Harbi (Al-Fateh)
- (Ukraine) Oleksandr Andriyevskyi (Dynamo Kyiv)
- (Ukraine) Denys Antyukh (Dynamo Kyiv)
- (Belgium) Manuel Benson (Royal Antwerp)
- (Netherlands) Steven Berghuis (AFC Ajax)
- (France) Brian Beyer (Yverdon-Sport)
- (Ukraine) Artem Bondarenko (Shakhtar Donetsk)
- (Ukraine) Andriy Boryachuk (Shakhtar Donetsk)
- (France) Philippe Boueye (Olympique Lyonnais)
- (Italy) Edoardo Bove (Roma)
- (Ukraine) Mykyta Burda (Dynamo Kyiv)
- (England) Jamie Bynoe-Gittens (Borussia Dortmund)
- (England) Dominic Calvert-Lewin (Everton)
- (Peru) Christian Cueva (Al-Fateh)
- (Mali) Bassekou Diabaté (Lechia Gdańsk)
- (Switzerland) Josip Drmić (HNK Rijeka)
- (France) Mohamed El Arouch (Olympique Lyonnais)
- (Kosovo) Lorik Emini (FC Luzern)
- (Turkey) Mustafa Erdilman (Antalyaspor)
- (Italy) Sebastiano Esposito (FC Basel)
- Denys Harmash (Ukraine)
- (Netherlands) Vincent Janssen (Royal Antwerp)
- (Ukraine) Dmytro Keda (Shakhtar Donetsk)
- (Ukraine) Dmytro Kryskiv (Shakhtar Donetsk)
- (Ukraine) Serhiy Kryvtsov (Shakhtar Donetsk)
- (Ghana) Mohammed Kudus (AFC Ajax)
- (Italy) Andrea La Mantia (Empoli)
- (Croatia) Franjo Lazar (Hajduk Split)
- (France) Sekou Lega (Olympique Lyonnais)
- (France) Castello Lukeba (Olympique Lyonnais)
- (Italy) Gianluca Mancini (Roma)
- (Bosnia and Herzegovina) Luka Menalo (Dinamo Zagreb)
- (Republic of Ireland) Conor Noß (Borussia M'gladbach)
- (Ukraine) Oleh Ocheretko (Shakhtar Donetsk)
- (Poland) Krystian Okoniewski (Lechia Gdańsk)
- (Italy) Lorenzo Pellegrini (Roma)
- (Ukraine) Denys Popov (Dynamo Kyiv)
- (Netherlands) Daishawn Redan (Utrecht)
- (Germany) Tom Rothe (Borussia Dortmund)
- (Netherlands) Mats Seuntjens (Fortuna Sittard)
- (Brazil) Tiquinho Soares (Olympiacos)
- (Israel) Manor Solomon (Shakhtar Donetsk)
- (Ukraine) Petro Stasyuk (Shakhtar Donetsk)
- (Ukraine) Taras Stepanenko (Shakhtar Donetsk)
- (Poland) Igor Strzałek (Legia Warsaw)
- (Ukraine) Vladyslav Supryaha (Dynamo Kyiv)
- (Hungary) Ádám Szalai (FC Basel)
- (Serbia) Dušan Tadić (AFC Ajax)
- (Burkina Faso) Lassina Traoré (Shakhtar Donetsk)
- (Ukraine) Vladyslav Vakula (Shakhtar Donetsk)
- (Ecuador) Enner Valencia (Fenerbahçe)
- (Peru) Alex Valera (Al-Fateh)
- (Slovenia) Benjamin Verbič (Dynamo Kyiv)
- (Montenegro) Milan Vukotić (Dinamo Zagreb)
- Roman Yaremchuk (Ukraine)
- (Ukraine) Oleksandr Yatsyk (Dynamo Kyiv)
- (Turkey) Barış Yılmaz (Galatasaray)
- (Italy) Nicolò Zaniolo (Roma)

== Dynamo Kyiv concerts ==
Those games that Dynamo played during the evening and in the first phase of the tour featured a concert, where Ukrainian singers sang songs before the game, at half time, and after the game. The first concert to be paired to a game on the tour was Dynamo's game against Legia Warsaw, with two further concerts following. Dynamo's game with Galatasaray was played in the afternoon and did not feature any performances of the Ukrainian singers, and was the only Dynamo friendly in the first phase of the tour to not feature a concert.

Dynamo's first game after the tour resumed, against Yverdon-Sport, also did not feature any singers present. Singers were present for the second game back, against Lausanne-Sport, however the match only featured two songs sung by professional singers, the lowest in any of the twos games to feature any singing/a concert.

Information	Song list	
1. 12 April 2022; Legia Warsaw	Prematch	Ukraine National Anthem - Veryovka Ukrainian Folk Choir "Oh, the Red Viburnum in the Meadow" - Veryovka Ukrainian Folk Choir
1. 12 April 2022; Legia Warsaw	Post match	"Imagine" - Kateryna Pavlenko & Karolina Cicha (Note: Polish singer, Karolina Cicha, sang "Imagine" as a duet with Kateryna Pavlenko.) "Kokhantsi" - Julia Sanina "SHUM" - Kateryna Pavlenko "Ukraine is Me" - Tina Karol "Oh, the Red Viburnum in the Meadow" - Dorofeeva, Kateryna Pavlenko, Julia Sanina & Tina Karol
2. 20 April 2022; CFR Cluj	Prematch	Ukraine National Anthem - Julia Sanina
2. 20 April 2022; CFR Cluj	Half-time	"Kokhantsi" - Julia Sanina "SHUM" - Kateryna Pavlenko "Wild Dances" - Ruslana "Oh, the Red Viburnum in the Meadow" - Dorofeeva, Kateryna Pavlenko, Julia Sanina & Ruslana
2. 20 April 2022; CFR Cluj	Post match	"Imagine" - Ruslana & Adela Todoran (Note: Romanian singer, Adela Todoran, sang "Imagine" as a duet with Ruslana.)
3. 26 April 2022; Borussia Dortmund	Prematch	Ukraine National Anthem - Julia Sanina
3. 26 April 2022; Borussia Dortmund	Half-time	"1944" - Jamala "Ave Maria" - Jamala
4. 28 April 2022; Dinamo Zagreb	Prematch	Ukraine National Anthem - Michelle Andrade
4. 28 April 2022; Dinamo Zagreb	Half-time	"Oh, the Red Viburnum in the Meadow" - Michelle Andrade
5. 4 May 2022; FC Basel	Prematch	"Vilna" - Tina Karol; Ukraine National Anthem - Tina Karol
5. 4 May 2022; FC Basel	Half-time	Two songs by Baschi
5. 4 May 2022; FC Basel	Post match	"Imagine" - Inessa Hrytsayenko
6. 13 May 2022; FC Flora	Prematch	"Misto Marii" - ALYA; Ukraine National Anthem - Alyona Alyona & Taras Topol (Note: Due to Taras Topol fighting with the Ukrainian Territorial Defence he was recorded singing while standing with his regiment. Alyona Alyona then sang the duet along with the pre-recorded video.)
6. 13 May 2022; FC Flora	Half-time	"Hold Me" - Khrystyna Soloviy & Kseniia Resnytska (Note: Kseniia Resnytska, a 12 year old refugee from Mariupol, sang a duet with Khrystyna Soloviy.) "Prayer" - Alyona Alyona & Jerry Heil "Oh, the Red Viburnum in the Meadow" - Alyona Alyona, Jerry Heil & Khrystyna Soloviy
6. 13 May 2022; FC Flora	Post match	"Imagine" - Vera Kekelija, Marta Adamchuk & TANJA (Note: Estonian singer, TANJA, sang "Imagine" with Vera Kekelija & Marta Adamchuk.)
7. 29 June 2022; Lausanne-Sport	Prematch	Ukraine National Anthem - NK
7. 29 June 2022; Lausanne-Sport	Post match	"Imagine" - KOLA & Inessa Hrytsaienko
8. 15 July 2022; Royal Antwerp	Prematch	Ukraine National Anthem - Dorofeeva
8. 15 July 2022; Royal Antwerp	Post match	"Imagine" - Inessa Hrytsaienko & Oleksandra Zaritska

The singers who featured in the concerts for the games listed above;
Featured in the matches concert Did not feature

Singer	1	2	3	4	5	6	7	8
Alyona Alyona								
ALYA								
Marta Adamchuk								
Michelle Andrade								
Dorofeeva								
Jerry Heil								
Inessa Hrytsayenko								
Jamala								
Tina Karol								
Vera Kekelija								
KOLA								
Kateryna Pavlenko								
NK								
Ruslana								
Julia Sanina								
Khrystyna Soloviy								
Taras Topolia								
Veryovka Ukrainian Folk Choir								
Oleksandra Zaritska								

Some of the singers are better known for their band than they are as a solo-artist. Those singers who have taken part in the concerts but are usually part of a band are; ALYA (Oleksandra Lishchuk) - The Pamphlets, Kateryna Pavlenko - Go_A, Julia Sanina - The Hardkiss, Taras Topol - Antibodies, and Oleksandra Zaritska - Kazka.

== Broadcasting ==
As the tour has been played in multiple countries, and often with the games being announced at short notice, the broadcasting rights of the games have been decided on a game-by-game basis. The broadcasting rights in Ukraine have remained the same throughout the competition, but with each country having their own sporting channels, each new country visited has resulted in new broadcasting rights needing to be secured. In most cases the games have been shown on free-to-air channels within the host country, with all games also being shown on the respective clubs YouTube channels to make each game available to a global audience.

As the second phase of the tour was less publicised, the games were continued to be broadcast on the teams YouTube channels, but broadcasting rights in each individual country was not attained in every case. 5 games did get domestic broadcasts, with those games often being from teams that had a larger fan base and were therefore more likely to watch the broadcast if it was made available, however large teams such as Olympique Lyonnais still failed to secure a domestic broadcast for either of their two games.

Nat.	Game	Domestic TV	Ukrainian TV	International
(Greece)	Olympiacos	One Channel	Football 1	FC Shakhtar Donetsk on YouTube
(Poland)	Legia Warsaw	TVP	2+2, Kyivstar TV	1+1, FC Dynamo Kyiv on YouTube
(Turkey)	Galatasaray	Galatasaray TV, TRT 3	2+2, Kyivstar TV, M1	1+1, FC Dynamo Kyiv on YouTube
(Poland)	Lechia Gdańsk	Polsat, Polsat Sport	Football 1	FC Shakhtar Donetsk on YouTube
(Turkey)	Fenerbahçe	TV8	Football 1	FC Shakhtar Donetsk on YouTube
(Romania)	CFR Cluj	Prima TV	2+2, Kyivstar TV, M1	1+1, FC Dynamo Kyiv on YouTube
(Turkey)	Antalyaspor	No rights	Football 1	FC Shakhtar Donetsk on YouTube
(Germany)	Borussia Dortmund	ZDF	2+2, Kyivstar TV, M1	1+1, FC Dynamo Kyiv on YouTube
(Croatia)	Dinamo Zagreb	HRT 2	2+2, Kyivstar TV, M1	1+1, FC Dynamo Kyiv on YouTube
(Croatia)	Hajduk Split	HRT 2	Football 1	FC Shakhtar Donetsk on YouTube
(Switzerland)	FC Basel	No rights	2+2, Kyivstar TV, M1	1+1, FC Dynamo Kyiv on YouTube
(Germany)	Borussia M'gladbach	ProSieben	Football 1, Indigo TV, OLL.TV	Ukrainian Association of Football on YouTube
(Estonia)	FC Flora	ERR, ETV2	2+2, Kyivstar TV, M1	1+1, FC Dynamo Kyiv on YouTube
(Italy)	Empoli	No rights	Football 1, Indigo TV, OLL.TV	Ukrainian Association of Football on YouTube
(Croatia)	HNK Rijeka	HRT2	Football 1, Indigo TV, OLL.TV	Ukrainian Association of Football on YouTube
(Switzerland)	Yverdon-Sport	No rights	No rights	FC Dynamo Kyiv on YouTube
(Switzerland)	Lausanne-Sport	No rights	No rights	FC Dynamo Kyiv on YouTube
(Switzerland)	FC Sion	No rights	No rights	FC Dynamo Kyiv on YouTube
(Switzerland)	BSC Young Boys	No rights	No rights	FC Dynamo Kyiv on YouTube
(Switzerland)	FC Luzern	No rights	No rights	FC Dynamo Kyiv on YouTube
(France)	Olympique Lyonnais (x2)	No rights	No rights	FC Dynamo Kyiv on YouTube
(Belgium)	Royal Antwerp	Eleven	2+2, Kyivstar TV, M1	1+1, FC Dynamo Kyiv on YouTube
(Netherlands)	Fortuna Sittard	No rights	No rights	FC Shakhtar Donetsk on YouTube
(Netherlands)	AFC Ajax	Ziggo	MEGOGO, XSPORT	FC Shakhtar Donetsk on YouTube
(England)	Everton	DAZN, ESPN+	2+2, Kyivstar TV, M1	1+1, FC Dynamo Kyiv on YouTube
(Netherlands)	FC Utrecht	ESPN	MEGOGO, XSPORT	FC Shakhtar Donetsk on YouTube
(Italy)	A.S. Roma	DAZN	MEGOGO, XSPORT	FC Shakhtar Donetsk on YouTube
(Saudi Arabia)	Al-Adalah FC	No rights	No rights	FC Shakhtar Donetsk on YouTube
(Slovenia)	NK Domžale	No rights	No rights	FC Shakhtar Donetsk on YouTube
(Saudi Arabia)	Al-Adalah FC (x2)	No rights	No rights	FC Shakhtar Donetsk 1 on YouTube

== See also ==
- Soccer Aid
- Game4Ukraine
