= Ivan Kovalenko =

Ukrainian footballer

Personal information
- Full name: Ivan Oleksandrovych Kovalenko
- Date of birth: 10 March 1999 (age 27)
- Place of birth: Kharkiv, Ukraine
- Height: 1.79 m (5 ft 10 1/2 in)
- Position: Left-back

Youth career
- 2013–2016: Metalist Kharkiv

Senior career*
Years	Team	Apps	(Gls)
2016	SC Metalist Kharkiv	11	(0)
2017–2024	Metalist 1925 Kharkiv	44	(0)
- * Club domestic league appearances and goals as of 4 July 2024 ‡ National team caps and goals as of 29 July 2021

Ivan Oleksandrovych Kovalenko (Ukrainian: Іван Олександрович Коваленко; born 10 March 1999) is a professional Ukrainian footballer who plays as a left-back.
