= Roman Mykhayliv =

Ukrainian footballer

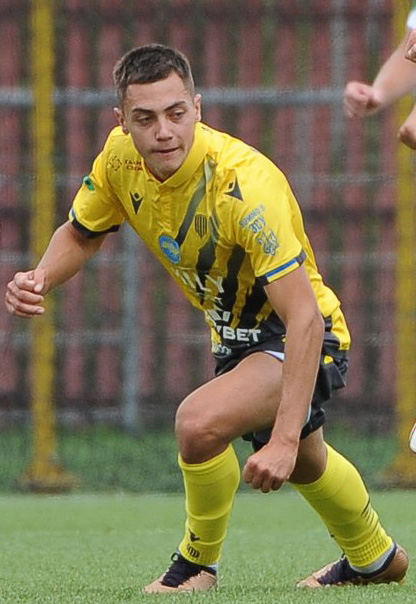
- Roman Mykhayliv playing for Rukh-2 Lviv in 2023

Personal information
- Full name: Roman Romanovych Mykhayliv
- Date of birth: 31 January 2003 (age 23)
- Place of birth: Lviv, Ukraine
- Height: 1.65 m (5 ft 5 in)
- Position: Midfielder

Team information
- Current team: Feniks Pidmonastyr

Youth career
- 2012–2014: Karpaty Lviv
- 2014–2020: Lviv
- 2020: Dynamo Kyiv

Senior career*
Years	Team	Apps	(Gls)
2020–2023	Dynamo Kyiv	0	(0)
2021	→ Lviv (loan)	1	(0)
2022–2023	→ Lviv (loan)	6	(0)
2023	Rukh Lviv	0	(0)
2023	Rukh-2 Lviv	14	(0)
2024–	Feniks Pidmonastyr		
- * Club domestic league appearances and goals as of 8 January 2024

Roman Romanovych Mykhayliv (Ukrainian: Роман Романович Михайлів; born 31 January 2003) is a Ukrainian professional footballer who plays as a midfielder for an amateur side Feniks Pidmonastyr.

== Career ==
Born in Lviv, Mykhayliv is a product of the local Karpaty Lviv and Lviv youth academy systems.

In October 2020, he transferred to Dynamo Kyiv. Almost one year later, in September 2021 he returned to Lviv on loan for the 2021–22 Ukrainian Premier League season. He made his professional debut as a second-half substitute on 20 November against Zorya Luhansk.
