= 2026–27 FC Chornomorets Odesa season =

FC Chornomorets Odesa
2026–27 season
- Owner: Vertex United
- General Director: Valery Deordiev
- Head coach: Roman Hryhorchuk
- Stadium: Chornomorets Stadium
- Ukrainian Premier League: TBD
- Ukrainian Cup: Round of 64
Home colours	Away colours	Third colours

The 2026–27 season is the 89th season in the history of FC Chornomorets Odesa, and the 36th season of the club in the domestic league/cup of Ukraine. It is the team's 29th season in the Ukrainian Premier League. The Sailors compete in the 2026–27 Ukrainian Premier League and 2026–27 Ukrainian Cup.

== Transfers, loans and other signings ==
=== June – September 2026 ===
==== Out ====
Date	Pos.	Player	Moved to	Particularities	Ref.
30 June 2026	DF	(Ukraine) Denys Gryshkevych	(Ukraine) Polissya-2 Zhytomyr	End of loan	
30 June 2026	FW	(Ukraine) Vladyslav Herych	(Ukraine) Dynamo Kyiv	End of loan	
30 June 2026	DF	(Ukraine) Vitaliy Yermakov	(Ukraine) Obolon Kyiv	End of contract	
30 June 2026	DF	(Ukraine) Oleksandr Kapliyenko		Career end	
30 June 2026	MF	(Ukraine) Oleksandr Sklyar	(Ukraine) UCSA Tarasivka	End of contract	
30 June 2026	MF	(Ukraine) Yuriy Romanyuk	(Ukraine) Mayak Sarny	End of contract	
30 June 2026	MF	(Ukraine) Artem Habelok	(Ukraine) Nyva Ternopil	End of contract	
30 June 2026	FW	(Ukraine) Vladyslav Kulach	(Ukraine) Mayak Sarny	End of contract	
30 June 2026	FW	(Ukraine) Maksym Lunyov		End of contract	
30 June 2026	FW	(Ukraine) Oleksiy Khoblenko	(Ukraine) UCSA Tarasivka	End of contract	
30 June 2026	GK	(Ukraine) Vadym Yushchyshyn	(Ukraine) UCSA Tarasivka	End of contract	
30 June 2026	MF	(Ukraine) Anel Ryce	(Panama) Plaza Amador	End of loan	

==== In ====
Date	Pos.	Player	Moved from	Particularities	Ref.
1 July 2026	FW	(Ukraine) Yevheniy Ryazantsev	(Ukraine) Podillya Khmelnytskyi	Loan return	
1 July 2026	DF	(Ukraine) Serhiy Korniychuk	(Ukraine) Polissya Zhytomyr	Free	
1 July 2026	GK	(Ukraine) Nazar Bayda	(Ukraine) Metalurh Zaporizhzhia	Free	
1 July 2026	FW	(Ukraine) Danyil Alefirenko	(Ukraine) Kolos Kovalivka	Undisclosed	
6 July 2026	MF	(Ukraine) Dmytro Klyots	(Ukraine) Veres Rivne	Free	
31 July 2026	FW	(Ukraine) Vladyslav Herych	(Ukraine) Dynamo Kyiv	Loan	
31 July 2026	FW	(Republic of the Congo) Jerry Yoka	(Ukraine) Polissya-2 Zhytomyr	Loan	
31 July 2026	DF	(Ukraine) Maryan Faryna	(Ukraine) Shakhtar Donetsk	Loan	
8 August 2026	DF	(Ukraine) Oleksiy Husyev	(Ukraine) Dynamo Kyiv	Loan	
29 August 2026	MF	(Ukraine) Oleh Pushkarov	(Ukraine) Shakhtar Donetsk	Undisclosed	
29 August 2026	MF	(Ukraine) Maksym Melnychenko	(Ukraine) Polissya Zhytomyr	Loan	
3 September 2026	FW	(Nigeria) Christian Mba	(Ukraine) FC Kharkiv	Loan	

== Season overview ==
Note: Only the date of an official match is marked in bold.

=== June 2026 ===
- June 25, 2026 The Sailors won against Real Pharma 4–0 in a friendly in Lymanka, Ukraine.
- June 28, 2026 Chornomorets defeated the amateur team To4ka 12–0 in a friendly in Lymanka.

=== July 2026 ===
- July 1, 2026 The Sailors won against Kryvbas Kryvyi Rih 2–1 in a friendly in Lymanka, Ukraine.
- July 4, 2026 Chornomorets lost 0–2 against FC Oleksandriya in a friendly in Lymanka, Ukraine.
- July 10, 2026 The Sailors won against Inhulets Petrove 1–0 in a friendly in Lymanka, Ukraine.
- July 18, 2026 Chornomorets won against Nyva Vinnytsia 2–1 in a friendly in Lymanka, Ukraine.
- July 19, 2026 The Sailors won against Real Pharma 2–0 in a friendly in Lymanka, Ukraine.
- July 25, 2026 Chornomorets played two friendly matches in Kovalivka against local side Kolos. The hosts won the first game 2–1. The second match ended in a 2–2 draw.

=== August 2026 ===
- **August 2, 2026** In the 1st round of the Ukrainian Premier League (UPL), playing in Odesa, the Sailors lost 1–2 against Polissya Zhytomyr. Faryna, Klyots, Korniychuk made their official debut as players of Chornomorets, and Robakidze scored his first goal in the UPL.
- August 8, 2026 Due to the attack on the stadium, Chornomorets cancelled the 2nd round match of the Ukrainian Premier League against Kolos Kovalivka.
- **August 16, 2026** In the 3rd round of the Ukrainian Premier League, playing in Cherkasy, the Sailors lost 0–2 against local side FC LNZ. Yoka made his official debut as a player of Chornomorets.
- **August 23, 2026** In the round of 64 (1/32) of the 2026–27 Ukrainian Cup, playing in Vilkhivtsi, Chornomorets lost 0–1 against local side SC Vilkhivtsi.
- **August 30, 2026** In the 4th round of the Ukrainian Premier League, playing in Odesa, the Sailors won 1–0 against Kryvbas Kryvyi Rih. Starting time of the match was delayed by fifteen minutes due to an air-raid warning. Pushkaryov made his official debut as a player of Chornomorets.

=== September 2026 ===
- **September 4, 2026** In the 5th round of the Ukrainian Premier League, playing in Odesa, Chornomorets drew 0–0 Livyi Bereh. Starting time of the match was delayed by forty minutes due to an air-raid warning. Husyev and Mba made their official debut as players of Chornomorets.
- **September 14, 2026** Ukrainian licensed online gambling and betting operator BETON officially became the new title sponsor of FC Chornomorets Odesa. In the 6th round of the Ukrainian Premier League, playing in Lviv, the Sailors lost 0–2 against Shakhtar Donetsk.
- September 17, 2026 Company "Creator-Bud" became a patron of the football club Chornomorets Odesa.
- **September 18, 2026** In the 7th round of the Ukrainian Premier League, playing in Odesa, Chornomorets drew 1–1 Obolon Kyiv. Odesa team jerseys featured new title sponsor BETON for the first time. Starting time of the match was delayed by twenty minutes due to an air-raid warning. The match was interrupted in the 12th minute due to an air-raid warning, and the break lasted 28 minutes. Next time the match was interrupted in the 37th minute again due to an air-raid warning, and the break lasted 36 minutes. The standard halftime break was cut to a minimum; the teams did not even go to the dressing rooms. The match continued until the 66th minute, when another air-raid warning began. This proved to be the longest one, lasting almost 45 minutes. In 10 minutes after the air-raid alert was ended, the players returned to the pitch, but before the referee could resume the match, the next air-raid warning — the shortest one — began. Fifteen minutes later, the match finally resumed.

=== October 2026 ===
- October 6, 2026 In a friendly match, the Sailors defeated 31–0 an amateur team of Armed Forces of Ukraine.
- **October 10, 2026** In the 8th round of the Ukrainian Premier League, playing in Odesa, Chornomorets lost 1–2 against FC Kharkiv.
- **October 17, 2026** In the 9th round of the Ukrainian Premier League, playing in Kyiv, the Sailors lost 1–2 against Zorya Luhansk. Melnychenko made his official debut as a player of Chornomorets, and Mba scored his first club goal. It was Roman Hryhorchuk’s 200th match as head coach in the UPL.
- **October 25, 2026** In the 10th round of the Ukrainian Premier League, playing in Odesa, Chornomorets drew 0–0 Karpaty Lviv.
- **October 31, 2026** In the 11th round of the Ukrainian Premier League, playing in Rivne, the Sailors won 3–1 against local side Veres. Kurko scored his first club goal, and Khoma scored his first goal in the UPL.

=== November 2026 ===
- **November 7, 2026** In the 12th round of the Ukrainian Premier League, playing in Rivne, Chornomorets lost 0–1 against FC Kudrivka. This was the first official-level match between the teams.
- **November 23, 2026** In the 13th round of the Ukrainian Premier League the Sailors will play home against Epitsentr Kamianets-Podilskyi. This will be the first official-level match between the teams.

== Club staff ==
=== Staff changes ===
- July 21, 2026 Valentyn Poltavets was appointed head coach of the Chornomorets-2 Odesa team.
- August 1, 2026 Victoria Samar was appointed head coach of the WFC Chornomorets Odesa team.

=== Staff (personalities and positions) ===
Job title	Since 1 July 2026	Since 1 August 2026
Administration
President	(Ukraine) Oleksandr Hranovskyi	
Vice-president	(Ukraine) Dmytro Shapiro	
General director	(Ukraine) Valeriy Deordiev	
Executive director	(Ukraine) Andriy Chernov	
Sporting director	-	-
Coaching (first team)
Head coach	(Ukraine) Roman Hryhorchuk	
Assistant coach	(Ukraine) Serhiy Politylo (Ukraine) (Russia) Andriy Parkhomenko	
Goalkeeping coach	(Ukraine) Andriy Hlushchenko	
Coaching (Chornomorets-2 team)
Head coach	(Ukraine) Valentyn Poltavets (Note: since 21 July 2026)	
Goalkeeping coach	(Ukraine) Serhiy Kravchenko	
Fitness coach	(Ukraine) Victoria Samar	-

== Kits ==
=== Kit information ===
It is Kelme's sixth year supplying Chornomorets Odesa kit. Only the main sponsor on the chest is marked in bold.

Supplier: Kelme / Chest sponsors: (Note: Only the title sponsor is marked in bold.) BETON (Note: since 14 September 2026), Pharmacy 9-1-1, Tavria V / Sleeve sponsors: UPL.TV, ТОЧКА. / Back sponsor: MTB Bank / Shorts sponsor: Tavria V

Kits without club sponsor names/logos
**Main kit**	**Second kit**	**Third kit**

== Pre-season and friendlies ==
Win Draw Loss Fixtures

=== Pre-season ===
25 June 2026 Friendly	**Chornomorets (Ukraine)**	**4–0**	**(Ukraine) Real Pharma**	Lymanka, Ukraine
18:00 EEST (UTC+03:00)		Report		Stadium: Complex "Lyustdorf"

28 June 2026 Friendly	**Chornomorets (Ukraine)**	**12–0**	**(Ukraine) To4ka**	Lymanka, Ukraine
TBD EEST (UTC+03:00)		TBD		Stadium: Complex "Lyustdorf"

1 July 2026 Friendly	**Chornomorets (Ukraine)**	**2–1**	**(Ukraine) Kryvbas Kryvyi Rih**	Lymanka, Ukraine
13:00 EEST (UTC+03:00)		Report		Stadium: Complex "Lyustdorf"
Note: Vlog

4 July 2026 Friendly	**Chornomorets (Ukraine)**	**0–2**	**(Ukraine) FC Oleksandriya**	Lymanka, Ukraine
13:00 EEST (UTC+03:00)		Report		Stadium: Complex "Lyustdorf"
Note: Vlog

10 July 2026 Friendly	**Chornomorets (Ukraine)**	**1–0**	**(Ukraine) Inhulets Petrove**	Lymanka, Ukraine
16:00 EEST (UTC+03:00)		Report		Stadium: Complex "Lyustdorf"
Note: Vlog

18 July 2026 Friendly	**Chornomorets (Ukraine)**	**2–1**	**(Ukraine) Nyva Vinnytsia**	Lymanka, Ukraine
15:00 EEST (UTC+03:00)		Report		Stadium: Complex "Lyustdorf"

19 July 2026 Friendly	**Chornomorets (Ukraine)**	**2–0**	**(Ukraine) Real Pharma**	Lymanka, Ukraine
12:00 EEST (UTC+03:00)		Report		Stadium: Complex "Lyustdorf"

25 July 2026 Friendly	**Kolos Kovalivka (Ukraine)**	**2–1**	**(Ukraine) Chornomorets**	Kovalivka, Ukraine
14:00 EEST (UTC+03:00)		Report		Stadium: Kolos

25 July 2026 Friendly	**Kolos Kovalivka (Ukraine)**	**2–2**	**(Ukraine) Chornomorets**	Kovalivka, Ukraine
16:00 EEST (UTC+03:00)		Report		Stadium: Kolos

=== Season breaks and Mid-season ===
6 October 2026 Friendly	**Chornomorets (Ukraine)**	**31–0**	**(Ukraine) AFU Team**	Lymanka, Ukraine
TBD EEST (UTC+03:00)		Report		Stadium: Complex "Lyustdorf"

== Competitions ==
=== Overall record ===
Competition	First match	Last match	Starting round	Final position	Record							
Competition	First match	Last match	Starting round	Final position	Pld	W	D	L	GF	GA	GD	Win %
Ukrainian Premier League	2 August 2026	4 June 2027	Matchday 1	TBD	11	2	3	6	8	13	−5	18.18
Ukrainian Cup	21 August 2026	19 May 2027	Round of 64	Round of 64	1	0	0	1	0	1	−1	0.00
Total					**12**	**2**	**3**	**7**	**8**	**14**	**−6**	**16.67**

Last updated: 7 November 2026
Source: Soccerway

=== Ukrainian Premier League ===
==== Results summary ====
Overall								Home						Away					
Pld	W	D	L	GF	GA	GD	Pts	W	D	L	GF	GA	GD	W	D	L	GF	GA	GD
11	2	3	6	8	13	−5	9	1	3	2	4	5	−1	1	0	4	4	8	−4

Last updated: 7 November 2026.
Source: Soccerway

==== Results by round ====
Round	1	2	3	4	5	6	7	8	9	10	11	12
Ground	H	H	A	H	H	A	H	H	A	H	A	A
Result	L		L	W	D	L	D	L	L	D	W	L
Position	?	?	?	?	?	?	?	?	?	?	?	?
Points	0		0	3	4	4	5	5	5	6	9	9
Head coach / Hryhorchuk	x		x	x	x	x	x	x	x	x	x	x

Updated to match(es) played on 7 November 2026. Source: Match protocols.
A = Away; H = Home; W = Win; D = Draw; L = Loss

==== Score overview ====
Win Draw Loss

Opposition	Home score	Away score	Aggregate score	Double
Shakhtar Donetsk		0–2		No
LNZ Cherkasy		0–2		No
Polissya Zhytomyr	1–2			No
Dynamo Kyiv				
FC Kharkiv	1–2			No
Kolos Kovalivka				
Kryvbas Kryvyi Rih	1–0			
Zorya Luhansk		1–2		No
Karpaty Lviv	0–0			No
Epitsentr Kamianets-Podilskyi				
Veres Rivne		3–1		
Obolon Kyiv	1–1			No
Bukovyna Chernivtsi				
Livyi Bereh Kyiv	0–0			No
FC Kudrivka		0–1		No

==== Matches ====
The league fixtures were announced on 26 June 2026.
Win Draw Loss Fixture

2 August 2026 1	**Chornomorets**	**1–2**	**Polissya Zhytomyr**	Odesa, Ukraine
13:00 EEST (UTC+03:00)	Robakidze 13'	Report	Veleten 32'; Krasnopir 50'	Stadium: Chornomorets; Attendance: 2,120; Referee: A. Kovalenko (Poltava)
Note: Protocol, Vlog, Starting captain (Note: Starting captain of the Chornomorets Odesa in the domestic league this season.) - V. Kurko (1) (Note: Number of matches as starting captain in the domestic league this season.), Kit (Note: Kit of the Chornomorets Odesa.) - Home colours

postponed 2	**Chornomorets**	?–?	**Kolos Kovalivka**	TBA
TBA		TBD		Stadium: TBA; Attendance: TBA; Referee: TBA
Note: Protocol, [TBD Vlog], Starting captain - TBA, Kit - Home colours

14 August 2026 3	**LNZ Cherkasy**	**2–0**	**Chornomorets**	Cherkasy, Ukraine
13:00 EEST (UTC+03:00)	Kravchuk 43'; Talles 55'	Report		Stadium: Cherkasy Arena; Attendance: 700; Referee: D. Panchyshyn (Kharkiv)
Note: Protocol, Vlog, Starting captain - V. Kurko (2), Kit - Away colours

30 August 2026 4	**Chornomorets**	**1–0**	**Kryvbas Kryvyi Rih**	Odesa, Ukraine
13:15 EEST (UTC+03:00)	Farasyeyenko 77'	Report		Stadium: Chornomorets; Attendance: 0 Referee: O. Solovian (Kyiv)
Note: Protocol, Vlog, Starting captain - V. Klymenko (2), Kit - Home colours

4 September 2026 5	**Chornomorets**	**0–0**	**Livyi Bereh**	Odesa, Ukraine
13:40 EEST (UTC+03:00)		Report		Stadium: Chornomorets; Attendance: 0 Referee: O. Kohut (Ternopil)
Note: Protocol, Vlog, Starting captain - V. Kurko (3), Kit - Home colours

14 September 2026 6	**Shakhtar Donetsk**	**2–0**	**Chornomorets**	Lviv, Ukraine
18:00 EEST (UTC+03:00)	Ocheretko 13'; Meirelles 34'	Report		Stadium: Arena Lviv; Attendance: 405; Referee: M. Kozyriatskyi (Zaporizhzhia)
Note: Protocol, Vlog, Starting captain - V. Kurko (4), Kit - Away colours

18 September 2026 7	**Chornomorets**	**1–1**	**Obolon Kyiv**	Odesa, Ukraine
13:20 EEST (UTC+03:00)	Popov 37' (pen.)	Report	Fedorivskyi 90+2'	Stadium: Chornomorets; Attendance: 0 Referee: Y. Tsybulko (Cherkasy Oblast)
Note: Protocol, Vlog, Starting captain - V. Kurko (5), Kit - Home colours

10 October 2026 8	**Chornomorets**	**1–2**	**FC Kharkiv**	Odesa, Ukraine
13:00 EEST (UTC+03:00)	Yoka (red card) 17' Popov 61'	Report	Paraco 24'; Zabërgja 58'	Stadium: Chornomorets; Attendance: 1,027; Referee: A. Kovalenko (Poltava)
Note: Protocol, Vlog, Starting captain - V. Klymenko (3), Kit - Home colours

17 October 2026 9	**Zorya Luhansk**	**2–1**	**Chornomorets**	Kyiv, Ukraine
13:00 EEST (UTC+03:00)	Boyko 27' Kushnirenko 89'	Report	Mba 45+3'	Stadium: Valeriy Lobanovskyi Dynamo Stadium; Attendance: 137; Referee: O. Shandor (Lviv)
Note: Protocol, Vlog, Starting captain - A. Avahimyan (1), Kit - Home colours

25 October 2026 10	**Chornomorets**	**0–0**	**Karpaty Lviv**	Odesa, Ukraine
13:00 EET (UTC+02:00)		Report	Pedroso (red card) 5'	Stadium: Chornomorets; Attendance: 1,496; Referee: D. Panchyshyn (Kharkiv)
Note: Protocol, Vlog, Starting captain - V. Kurko (6), Kit - Home colours

31 October 2026 11	**Veres Rivne**	**1–3**	**Chornomorets**	Rivne, Ukraine
13:00 EET (UTC+02:00)	Wesley 3'	Report	Kurko 21'; Mba 33'; Khoma 70'	Stadium: Avanhard Stadium; Attendance: 1,321; Referee: O. Kohut (Ternopil)
Note: Protocol, Vlog, Starting captain - V. Kurko (7), Kit - Third colours

7 November 2026 12	**FC Kudrivka**	**1–0**	**Chornomorets**	Rivne, Ukraine
13:00 EET (UTC+02:00)	Smyrnyi 9'	Report		Stadium: Avanhard Stadium; Attendance: 63; Referee: K. Zabroda (Kyiv)
Note: Protocol, Vlog, Starting captain - V. Kurko (8), Kit - Home colours

23 November 2026 13	**Chornomorets**	?–?	**Epitsentr Kamianets-Podilskyi**	Odesa, Ukraine
13:00 EET (UTC+02:00)		TBD		Stadium: Chornomorets; Attendance: TBA; Referee: N. Dyord (Uzhhorod)
Note: Protocol, [TBD Vlog], Starting captain - TBA, Kit - Home colours

=== Ukrainian Cup ===
Win Draw Loss

23 August 2026 Round of 64	**SC Vilkhivtsi**	**1–0**	**Chornomorets**	Vilkhivtsi, Ukraine
16:00 EEST (UTC+03:00)	Shestakov 33'	Report		Stadium: Vilkhivtsi-Arena-Park; Attendance: TBA; Referee: I. Salash (Kalush)
Note: Protocol, Vlog, Starting captain - V. Klymenko (1), Kit - Home colours

== Statistics ==
=== Clean sheets ===
The list is sorted by squad number when total clean sheets are equal.

Rank	No.	Player	Domestic League	Domestic Cup	Total
1	12	(Nigeria) Chijioke Aniagboso	3	0	3
Totals			3	0	3

Source: Match protocols.
