= 2025–26 FC Chornomorets Odesa season =

FC Chornomorets Odesa
2025–26 season
- Owner: Vertex United
- General Director: Anatoly Mysyura (until 17 September 2025); Valery Deordiev (since 18 September 2025)
- Head coach: Oleksandr Kucher (until 13 January 2026); Roman Hryhorchuk (since 14 January 2026)
- Stadium: Chornomorets Stadium
- Ukrainian First League: 2nd of 16 (promoted)
- Ukrainian Cup: Round of 32
- Top goalscorer: League: Vladyslav Herych (8); All: Vladyslav Herych (8)
Home colours	Away colours	Third colours

The 2025–26 season was the 88th season in the history of FC Chornomorets Odesa, and the 35th season of the club in the domestic league/cup of Ukraine. It was the team's 6th season in the Ukrainian First League after four consecutive seasons in the top flight of Football in Ukraine. The Sailors were competing in the 2025–26 Ukrainian First League and 2025–26 Ukrainian Cup. During the season the club celebrated its 90th anniversary since its foundation. On 1 June 2026, the Sailors were promoted to the Ukrainian Premier League following a 1–0 win against Metalist Kharkiv. This was the 5th time the team reached the Ukrainian Premier League, having finished 2nd in the Ukrainian First League.

== Transfers, loans and other signings ==
=== June – October 2025 ===
==== Out ====
Date	Pos.	Player	Moved to	Particularities	Ref.
30 June 2025	MF	(Ukraine) Bogdan Panchyshyn	(Ukraine) Polissya-2 Zhytomyr	End of loan	
30 June 2025	DF	(Brazil) Ryan Carlos Santos de Sousa	(Brazil) Bahia	End of loan	
1 July 2025	DF	(Ukraine) Bohdan Butko		End of contract	
1 July 2025	GK	(Ukraine) Artur Rudko		End of contract	
1 July 2025	DF	(Bosnia and Herzegovina) Vladimir Arsić		End of contract	
1 July 2025	DF	(Georgia (country)) Luka Latsabidze	(Ukraine) Shakhtar Donetsk	End of loan	
1 July 2025	DF	(Ukraine) Danylo Udod	(Ukraine) Shakhtar Donetsk	End of loan	
1 July 2025	MF	(Ukraine) Kyrylo Siheyev	(Ukraine) Shakhtar Donetsk	End of loan	
1 July 2025	FW	(Tajikistan) Khusrav Toirov	(Ukraine) Shakhtar Donetsk	End of loan	
1 July 2025	MF	(Ukraine) Ihor Kohut	(Ukraine) Metalist 1925 Kharkiv	End of loan	
1 July 2025	MF	(Azerbaijan) Emil Mustafayev	(Ukraine) Polissya Zhytomyr	End of loan	
1 July 2025	DF	(Brazil) Caio Gomes	(Brazil) Brusque Futebol Clube	Free	
1 July 2025	MF	(Slovenia) Jon Šporn		Released	
1 July 2025	FW	(Ukraine) Illya Shevtsov		Released	
3 July 2025	FW	(Ukraine) Denis Yanakov	(Ukraine) Epitsentr Kamianets-Podilskyi	Free	
13 July 2025	DF	(Ukraine) Yaroslav Kysil	(Ukraine) LNZ Cherkasy	Undisclosed	
29 July 2025	FW	(Ukraine) Denys Bezborodko	(Ukraine) Kudrivka	Free	

==== In ====
Date	Pos.	Player	Moved from	Particularities	Ref.
1 July 2025	MF	(Ukraine) Ivan Kohut	(Ukraine) Livyi Bereh	Free	
1 July 2025	MF	(Ukraine) Mykola Kohut	(Ukraine) Livyi Bereh	Free	
1 July 2025	DF	(Ukraine) Oleksandr Osman	(Ukraine) Obolon Kyiv	Free	
8 July 2025	DF	(Ukraine) Tymofiy Sukhar	(Ukraine) Kolos Kovalivka	Free	
8 July 2025	MF	(Ukraine) Yuriy Romanyuk	(Ukraine) Prykarpattia Ivano-Frankivsk	Free	
13 July 2025	MF	(Ukraine) Rostyslav Rusyn	(Ukraine) Metalist 1925 Kharkiv	Free	
13 July 2025	DF	(Ukraine) Maksym Lopyryonok	(Ukraine) Bukovyna Chernivtsi	Free	
13 July 2025	DF	(Ukraine) Nikita Stepovy	(Ukraine) Palmira Odesa	Free	
14 July 2025	FW	(Ukraine) Vladyslav Kulach	(Ukraine) Vorskla Poltava	Free	
14 July 2025	MF	(Ukraine) Oleksandr Sklyar	(Ukraine) Vorskla Poltava	Free	
14 July 2025	FW	(Ukraine) Yevheniy Ryazantsev	(Ukraine) Mynai	Free	
18 July 2025	MF	(The Gambia) Muhammed Jobe	(Ukraine) Polissya-2 Zhytomyr	Free	
18 July 2025	GK	(Ukraine) Vadym Yushchyshyn	(Ukraine) Vorskla Poltava	Free	
25 August 2025	DF	(Ukraine) Yevhen Khacheridi	Career break	Free	
5 September 2025	FW	(Ukraine) Vladyslav Herych	(Ukraine) Dynamo Kyiv	Loan	
5 September 2025	FW	(Venezuela) Luifer Hernández	(Ukraine) Polissya Zhytomyr	Loan	
30 October 2025	MF	(Ukraine) Maksym Lunyov	(Ukraine) Kryvbas Kryvyi Rih	Free	

=== December 2025 – March 2026 ===
==== Out ====
Date	Pos.	Player	Moved to	Particularities	Ref.
31 December 2025	FW	(Venezuela) Luifer Hernández	(Ukraine) Polissya Zhytomyr	End of loan	
1 January 2026	DF	(Ukraine) Yevhen Khacheridi	End of career		
1 January 2026	DF	(Ukraine) Oleksandr Osman	(Ukraine) UCSA	Free	
1 January 2026	MF	(Ukraine) Rostyslav Rusyn	(Ukraine) Feniks-Mariupol	Free	
16 January 2026	DF	(Ukraine) Yevheniy Skyba	(Czech Republic) Karviná	€100,000	
6 February 2026	DF	(Ukraine) Maksym Lopyryonok	(Ukraine) Bratslav Vinnytsia		
6 February 2026	DF	(Ukraine) Tymofiy Sukhar	TBA		
16 February 2026	DF	(Ukraine) Yaroslav Rakitskyi	Career break		
26 February 2026	DF	(Ukraine) Bohdan Biloshevskyi	(Ukraine) SC Poltava		
26 February 2026	FW	(Brazil) João Neto	TBA		
4 March 2026	GK	(Ukraine) Yan Vichnyi	TBA		
4 March 2026	FW	(Ukraine) Yevheniy Ryazantsev	(Ukraine) Podillya Khmelnytskyi	Loan	

==== In ====
Date	Pos.	Player	Moved from	Particularities	Ref.
15 January 2026	DF	(Ukraine) Vasyl Kurko	(Ukraine) Obolon Kyiv	Free	
22 January 2026	MF	(Ukraine) Vladyslav Klymenko	(Ukraine) Karpaty Lviv	Free	
26 January 2026	FW	(Ukraine) Andriy Khoma	(Ukraine) Prykarpattia Ivano-Frankivsk	€50,000	
26 January 2026	DF	(Ukraine) Oleksandr Kapliyenko	(Ukraine) LNZ Cherkasy	Free	
29 January 2026	MF	(Ukraine) Artur Avahimyan	(Ukraine) LNZ Cherkasy	Free	
3 February 2026	MF	(Ukraine) Vitaliy Farasyeyenko	(Ukraine) Inhulets Petrove	€100,000	
10 February 2026	GK	(Ukraine) Maksym Koval	(Kazakhstan) Yelimay	Free	
11 February 2026	DF	(Ukraine) Denys Gryshkevych	(Ukraine) Polissya-2 Zhytomyr	Loan	

== Season overview ==
Note: Only the date of an official match is marked in bold.

=== June 2025 ===
- June 25, 2025 The Sailors won against Nyva Vinnytsia 3–0 in a friendly in Lymanka, Ukraine.
- June 27, 2025 Chornomorets won against Real Pharma 4–0 in a friendly in Lymanka, Ukraine.

=== July 2025 ===
- July 4, 2025 The Sailors lost against Inhulets Petrove 1–3 in a friendly in Lymanka, Ukraine.
- July 7, 2025 Chornomorets won against Real Pharma 3–1 in a friendly in Lymanka, Ukraine.
- July 9, 2025 The Sailors lost against Rukh Lviv 0–1 in a friendly in Vynnyky, Ukraine.
- July 16, 2025 Chornomorets lost against Obolon Kyiv 0–2 in a friendly in Bucha, Ukraine.
- July 20, 2025 The Sailors won against Real Pharma 4–1 in a friendly in Lymanka, Ukraine.
- July 23, 2025 Chornomorets won against Palmira 4–0 in a friendly in Lymanka, Ukraine.
- July 25, 2025 The Sailors won against LNZ Cherkasy 2–1 in a friendly in Cherkasy, Ukraine.

=== August 2025 ===
- **August 2, 2025** In the 1st round of the Ukrainian First League, playing at home, Chornomorets outlasted Nyva Ternopil, winning 2–1. Romanyuk, Sukhar, Sklyar, I. Kohut, M. Kohut, Osman, Jobe and Ryazantsev made their official debut as players of Chornomorets. Sklyar and I. Kohut scored their first club goals.
- **August 10, 2025** In the 2nd round of the Ukrainian First League, playing in Khmelnytskyi, the Sailors outlasted local side Podillya, winning 2–0. Rakitskyi and Ryazantsev scored their first club goals.
- August 14, 2025 Control and Disciplinary Committee of the Ukrainian Association of Football has awarded Nyva Ternopil a technical defeat (0–3) in the match of the first round of Ukrainian First League against Chornomorets Odesa.
- **August 16, 2025** In the 3rd round of the Ukrainian First League, playing at home, the Sailors drew Vorskla Poltava 0–0.
- **August 23, 2025** In the round of 64 (1/32) of the 2025–26 Ukrainian Cup, Chornomorets played at home against Zorya Luhansk, winning 2–1 and moving on to the round of 32 (1/16). Lopyryonok and Yushchyshyn made their official debut as players of Chornomorets. Lopyryonok scored his first club goal, and Khoblenko scored his first goal in the Ukrainian Cup matches.
- **August 29, 2025** In the 4th round of the Ukrainian First League, playing in Bucha, the Sailors outlasted FC UCSA, winning 1–0. Khacheridi made his official debut as a player of Chornomorets.

=== September 2025 ===
- **September 7, 2025** In the 5th round of the Ukrainian First League, playing at home, Chornomorets outlasted Feniks-Mariupol, winning 2–0. Herych and Hernández made their official debut as players of Chornomorets.
- **September 13, 2025** In the 6th round of the Ukrainian First League, playing in Odesa, the Sailors won 3–0 against Metalurh Zaporizhzhia. The match was interrupted in the 79th minute due to an air raid warning that lasted for almost an hour, and was finished after the air raid alarm ended. Kulach made his official debut as a player of Chornomorets.
- **September 20, 2025** In the 7th round of the Ukrainian First League, playing in Petrove, Chornomorets outlasted local side FC Inhulets, winning 3–2. Herych and Hernández scored their first club goals.
- **September 24, 2025** In the round of 32 (1/16) of the 2025–26 Ukrainian Cup, playing in Tyshkivka, the Sailors drew the local side Ahrotekh 1–1 in regular time, but lost in a penalty shootout 3–5. Starting time of the match was delayed by forty minutes due to an air raid warning. Rusyn and Kozyr, made their official debut as players of Chornomorets.
- **September 28, 2025** In the 8th round of the Ukrainian First League, playing at home, Chornomorets outlasted Ahrobiznes Volochysk, winning 1–0.

=== October 2025 ===
- **October 4, 2025** In the 9th round of the Ukrainian First League, playing in Horodenka, the Sailors outlasted local side FC Probiy, winning 2–0. Mykola Kohut scored his first goal as a player of Chornomorets.
- **October 9, 2025** In the 10th round of the Ukrainian First League, playing in Odesa, Chornomorets drew Viktoriya Sumy 0–0.
- **October 13, 2025** In the 10th round of the Ukrainian First League, playing in Ivano-Frankivsk, the Sailors drew local side Prykarpattia-Blaho 1–1. Kulach scored his first goal as a player of Chornomorets.
- **October 19, 2025** In the 12th round of the Ukrainian First League, playing in Odesa, Chornomorets outlasted FC Chernihiv, winning 1–0. Ryce scored his first goal as a player of Chornomorets.
- **October 19, 2025** In the 13th round of the Ukrainian First League, playing in Kyiv Oblast, the Sailors drew Livyi Bereh Kyiv 1–1.

=== November 2025 ===
- **November 2, 2025** In the 14th round of the Ukrainian First League, playing in Odesa, Chornomorets lost 1–2 against Bukovyna Chernivtsi. Lunyov made his official debut as a player of Chornomorets.
- **November 8, 2025** In the 15th round of the Ukrainian First League, playing in Uzhhorod, the Sailors drew Metalist Kharkiv 1–1.
- **November 16, 2025** In the 16th round of the Ukrainian First League, playing in Ternopil, Chornomorets outlasted local side Nyva, winning 1–0.
- **November 22, 2025** In the 17th round of the Ukrainian First League, playing in Odesa, the Sailors won 4–1 against Podillya Khmelnytskyi. Robakidze scored his first goal as a player of Chornomorets. The match was interrupted in the 46th minute due to an air raid warning that lasted for almost three hours, and was finished after the air raid alarm ended.
- **November 29, 2025** In the 18th round of the Ukrainian First League, playing in Poltava, Chornomorets lost 0–3 against local side Vorskla. The match was interrupted in the 42th minute due to an air raid warning that lasted more than an hour, and was finished after the air raid alarm ended.

=== February 2026 ===
- February 8, 2026 The Sailors won against Real Pharma 5–0 in a friendly in Lymanka. On the same day they also won against amateur team Tochka-Energetik 4–0 in a friendly in Lymanka.
- February 14, 2026 Chornomorets won against amateur team South Palmira NGU 5–0 in a friendly in Lymanka.
- February 17, 2026 The Sailors won against Chornomorets-2 5–1 in a friendly in Lymanka.
- February 23, 2026 Chornomorets lost against Polissya Zhytomyr 2–3 in a friendly in Hlybochytsia.
- February 24, 2026 The Sailors lost against Nyva Vinnytsia 0–1 in a friendly in Lymanka.

=== March 2026 ===
- March 2, 2026 Chornomorets won against Chornomorets-2 16–1 in a friendly in Lymanka. On the same day the Sailors also won against Real Pharma 3–1 in a friendly in Lymanka.
- March 8, 2026 The Sailors lost against Kolos Kovalivka 0–2 in a friendly in Kovalivka.
- March 9, 2026 Chornomorets won against Real Pharma 5–0 in a friendly in Lymanka.
- March 14, 2026 The Sailors lost against Nyva Ternopil 0–1 in a friendly in Lymanka.
- March 15, 2026 Chornomorets won against Real Pharma 2–0 in a friendly in Lymanka.
- **March 21, 2026** In the 19th round of the Ukrainian First League, playing in Odesa, the Sailors won 1–0 against UCSA Tarasivka. Koval, Gryshkevych, Kapliyenko, Klymenko, Kurko, Avahimyan, and Khoma made their official debut as players of Chornomorets in the 2025–26 season.
- March 26, 2026 FC Chornomorets Odesa celebrated its 90th anniversary since its foundation.
- **March 28, 2026** In the 20th round of the Ukrainian First League, playing in Lviv, the Sailors drew Feniks-Mariupol 1–1. Faraseyenko made his official debut as a player of Chornomorets.

=== April 2026 ===
- **April 3, 2026** In the 21st round of the Ukrainian First League, playing in Zaporizhzhia, Chornomorets won 1–0 against local side Metalurh Zaporizhzhia. During extra time the match was interrupted due to an air raid warning that lasted half an hour, and was finished after the air raid alarm ended. Khoma scored his first goal as a player of Chornomorets.
- **April 8, 2026** In the 22nd round of the Ukrainian First League, playing in Odesa, the Sailors outlasted Inhulets Petrove, winning 2–0. The match was interrupted in the 46th minute due to an air raid warning that lasted more than an hour, and was finished after the air raid alarm ended. Klymenko scored his first goal as a player of Chornomorets this season.
- **April 12, 2026** In the 23rd round of the Ukrainian First League, playing in Volochysk, Chornomorets won 2–1 against local side Ahrobiznes Volochysk.
- **April 18, 2026** In the 24th round of the Ukrainian First League, playing in Odesa, the Sailors outlasted Probiy Horodenka, winning 1–0.
- **April 26, 2026** In the 25th round of the Ukrainian First League, playing in Trostyanets, Chornomorets lost 0–4 against Viktoriya Sumy.

=== May 2026 ===
- **May 3, 2026** In the 26th round of the Ukrainian First League, playing in Odesa, the Sailors outlasted Prykarpattia-Blaho, winning 3–0.
- **May 9, 2026** In the 27th round of the Ukrainian First League, playing in Chernihiv, Chornomorets drew local side FC Chernihiv 2–2.
- **May 16, 2026** In the 28th round of the Ukrainian First League, playing in Odesa, the Sailors drew Livyi Bereh 1–1. Both halves of the match started with a delay due to an air raid warning. Yermakov played his 100th official match as a player of FC Chornomorets Odesa.
- **May 23, 2026** In the 29th round of the Ukrainian First League, playing in Chernivtsi, Chornomorets won 3–1 against local side Bukovyna. Farasyeyenko scored his first goal as a player of Chornomorets.

=== June 2026 ===
- **June 1, 2026** In the 30th round of the Ukrainian First League, playing in Odesa, the Sailors outlasted Metalist Kharkiv 1–0, marking their 5th return to the top flight of Football in Ukraine. The start of the match was delayed by 40 minutes due to an air raid warning that was announced a few minutes before kick-off. The match was interrupted in the 67th minute due to an air raid warning that lasted twenty minutes, and was finished after the air raid alarm ended. FC Chornomorets dedicated the match to the memory of the fallen fans who gave their lives for Ukraine in the war against Russia that has been going on since 2014.

== Club staff ==
=== Staff changes ===
- June 9, 2025 As it became known one of the assistants of the head coach of Chornomorets, Anatoliy Didenko, has left his post. However, he did not leave the club, but took the position of senior coach of the U-19 team.
- June 10, 2025 It was announced that Andriy Uschapovskyi will replace Oleksandr Babych as sporting director of the first team.
- June 17, 2025 It was announced that FC Chornomorets hired Oleksandr Rybka as goalkeepers coach.
- September 18, 2025 According to the analytical online platform "YouControl", Valeriy Deordiev has become the new general director of the club. Already former general director Anatoliy Mysyura remained at the club and will now serve as executive director.
- January 8, 2026 According to the FC Chornomorets Odesa head coach of the Chornomorets-2 team Anatoliy Didenko has left the club.
- January 13, 2026 According to the media head coach of the first team Oleksandr Kucher has been fired.
- January 14, 2026 It was announced that Chornomorets Odesa had appointed Roman Hryhorchuk as new head coach of the first team. According to the media Andriy Chernov replaced Anatoliy Mysyura as Executive director.
- January 16, 2026 FC Chornomorets has officially announced the appointment of Denys Kolchin as the club's head coach of the Chornomorets-2 team. It is noted that the specialist will also become the club's deputy general director for youth and youth football development. On the same day was announced that Anatoliy Mysyura (his latest job in the club was executive director) leaves FC Chornomorets.

=== Staff (personalities and positions) ===
Job title	Since 1 July 2025	Since 2026
Administration
President	(Ukraine) Oleksandr Hranovskyi	
Vice-president	(Ukraine) Dmytro Shapiro	
General director	(Ukraine) Anatoliy Mysyura (Ukraine) Valeriy Deordiev	(Ukraine) Valeriy Deordiev
Executive director	(Ukraine) Artur Ohanesyan (Ukraine) Anatoliy Mysyura	(Ukraine) Andriy Chernov
Sporting director	(Ukraine) Andriy Uschapovskyi	-
Coaching (first team)
Head coach	(Ukraine) Oleksandr Kucher	(Ukraine) Roman Hryhorchuk
Assistant coach	(Ukraine) Taras Gvozdyk (Ukraine) Oleksandr Pryzetko (Ukraine) Oleksandr Hrytsay	(Ukraine) Serhiy Politylo (Ukraine) (Russia) Andriy Parkhomenko
Goalkeeping coach	(Ukraine) Oleksandr Rybka	(Ukraine) Andriy Hlushchenko
Coaching (Chornomorets-2 team)
Head coach	(Ukraine) Anatoliy Didenko	(Ukraine) Denys Kolchin
Assistant coach	(Ukraine) Vitaliy Starovyk	(Ukraine) Vitaliy Starovyk (Ukraine) Andriy Uschapovskyi
Goalkeeping coach	(Ukraine) Yevhen Borovyk	
Fitness coach	(Ukraine) Victoria Samar	
Coach analyst	(Ukraine) Sergey Aristarkhov	

== Kits ==
=== Kit information ===
It was Kelme's fifth year supplying Chornomorets Odesa kit.

Supplier: Kelme / Chest sponsors: vbet, Tavria V / Sleeve sponsors: Kelme, vbet / Back sponsor: MTB Bank / Shorts sponsor: Tavria V

Kits without club sponsor names/logos
Main kit	Second kit	Third kit

== Pre-season and friendlies ==
Win Draw Loss

=== Pre-season ===
25 June 2025 Friendly	Chornomorets (Ukraine)	3–0	(Ukraine) Nyva Vinnytsia	Lymanka, Ukraine
16:00 EEST (UTC+03:00)		Report		Stadium: Complex "Lyustdorf"
Note: Vlog

27 June 2025 Friendly	Chornomorets (Ukraine)	4–0	(Ukraine) Real Pharma	Lymanka, Ukraine
10:00 EEST (UTC+03:00)		Report		Stadium: Complex "Lyustdorf"
Note: Vlog

4 July 2025 Friendly	Chornomorets (Ukraine)	1–3	(Ukraine) Inhulets Petrove	Lymanka, Ukraine
11:00 EEST (UTC+03:00)		Report		Stadium: Complex "Lyustdorf"
Note: Vlog

7 July 2025 Friendly	Chornomorets (Ukraine)	3–1	(Ukraine) Real Pharma	Lymanka, Ukraine
11:00 EEST (UTC+03:00)		Report		Stadium: Complex "Lyustdorf"
Note: Vlog

9 July 2025 Friendly	Rukh Lviv (Ukraine)	1–0	(Ukraine) Chornomorets	Vynnyky, Ukraine
11:00 EEST (UTC+03:00)		Report		Stadium: Training base FC "Rukh Lviv"
Note: Vlog

16 July 2025 Friendly	Obolon Kyiv (Ukraine)	2–0	(Ukraine) Chornomorets	Bucha, Ukraine
17:00 EEST (UTC+03:00)		Report		Stadium: Training base FC "Obolon Kyiv"

20 July 2025 Friendly	Chornomorets (Ukraine)	4–1	(Ukraine) Real Pharma	Lymanka, Ukraine
11:00 EEST (UTC+03:00)		Report		Stadium: Complex "Lyustdorf"
Note: Vlog

23 July 2025 Friendly	Chornomorets (Ukraine)	4–0	(Ukraine) Palmira Odesa	Lymanka, Ukraine
17:00 EEST (UTC+03:00)		Report		Stadium: Complex "Lyustdorf"

25 July 2025 Friendly	LNZ Cherkasy (Ukraine)	1–2	(Ukraine) Chornomorets	Cherkasy, Ukraine
13:00 EEST (UTC+03:00)		Report		Stadium: Training center FC LNZ Cherkasy

=== Mid-season ===
8 February 2026 Friendly	Chornomorets (Ukraine)	5–0	(Ukraine) Real Pharma	Lymanka, Ukraine
13:00 EET (UTC+02:00)		Report		Stadium: Complex "Lyustdorf"
Note: Vlog

8 February 2026 Friendly	Chornomorets (Ukraine)	4–0	(Ukraine) Tochka-Energetik	Lymanka, Ukraine
14:30 EET (UTC+02:00)		Report		Stadium: Complex "Lyustdorf"
Note: Vlog

14 February 2026 Friendly	Chornomorets (Ukraine)	5–0	(Ukraine) South Palmira NGU	Lymanka, Ukraine
12:30 EET (UTC+02:00)		Report		Stadium: Complex "Lyustdorf"
Note: Vlog

17 February 2026 Friendly	Chornomorets (Ukraine)	5–1	(Ukraine) Chornomorets-2	Lymanka, Ukraine
13:30 EET (UTC+02:00)		Report		Stadium: Complex "Lyustdorf"

23 February 2026 Friendly	Polissya Zhytomyr (Ukraine)	3–2	(Ukraine) Chornomorets	Hlybochytsia, Ukraine
12:30 EET (UTC+02:00)		Report		Stadium: ETC Polissya
Note: Vlog

24 February 2026 Friendly	Chornomorets (Ukraine)	0–1	(Ukraine) Nyva Vinnytsia	Lymanka, Ukraine
14:00 EET (UTC+02:00)		Report		Stadium: Complex "Lyustdorf"
Note: Vlog

2 March 2026 Friendly	Chornomorets (Ukraine)	16–1	(Ukraine) Chornomorets-2	Lymanka, Ukraine
12:15 EET (UTC+02:00)		Report		Stadium: Complex "Lyustdorf"

2 March 2026 Friendly	Chornomorets (Ukraine)	3–1	(Ukraine) Real Pharma	Lymanka, Ukraine
15:30 EET (UTC+02:00)		Report		Stadium: Complex "Lyustdorf"

8 March 2026 Friendly	Kolos Kovalivka (Ukraine)	2–0	(Ukraine) Chornomorets	Kovalivka, Ukraine
14:00 EET (UTC+02:00)		Report		Stadium: Kolos
Note: Protocol Vlog

9 March 2026 Friendly	Chornomorets (Ukraine)	5–0	(Ukraine) Real Pharma	Lymanka, Ukraine
14:00 EET (UTC+02:00)		Report		Stadium: Complex "Lyustdorf"

14 March 2026 Friendly	Chornomorets (Ukraine)	0–1	(Ukraine) Nyva Ternopil	Lymanka, Ukraine
15:00 EET (UTC+02:00)		Report		Stadium: Complex "Lyustdorf"

15 March 2026 Friendly	Chornomorets (Ukraine)	2–0	(Ukraine) Real Pharma	Lymanka, Ukraine
14:00 EET (UTC+02:00)		Report		Stadium: Complex "Lyustdorf"

== Competitions ==
=== Overall record ===
Competition	First match	Last match	Starting round	Final position	Record							
Competition	First match	Last match	Starting round	Final position	Pld	W	D	L	GF	GA	GD	Win %
Ukrainian First League	2 August 2025	30 May 2026	Matchday 1	2nd	30	19	8	3	44	20	+24	63.33
Ukrainian Cup	23 August 2025	24 September 2025	Round of 64	Round of 32	2	1	1	0	3	2	+1	50.00
Total					32	20	9	3	47	22	+25	62.50

Last updated: 1 June 2026
Source: Soccerway
Note: Control and Disciplinary Committee of the UAF has awarded Nyva Ternopil a technical defeat (0–3) in the 1st round match of the Ukrainian First League against Chornomorets Odesa.

=== Ukrainian First League ===
==== League table ====
Pos	Team	Pld	W	D	L	GF	GA	GD	Pts	Promotion, qualification or relegation
1	Bukovyna Chernivtsi (P, C)	30	26	3	1	74	21	+53	81	Promotion to Ukrainian Premier League
2	CHORNOMORETS ODESA (P)	30	19	8	3	44	20	+24	65	Promotion to Ukrainian Premier League
3	Livyi Bereh Kyiv (O, P)	30	19	6	5	50	21	+29	63	Qualification to promotion play-offs
4	Ahrobiznes Volochysk	30	16	5	9	36	28	+8	53	Qualification to promotion play-offs
5	Inhulets Petrove	30	12	10	8	41	32	+9	46	
6	Prykarpattia-Blaho	30	9	10	11	33	33	0	37	
7	Metalist Kharkiv	30	10	7	13	31	35	−4	37	
8	Probiy Horodenka	30	10	6	14	29	37	−8	36 (Note: Ranked on head-to-head points Head-to-head goal difference Head-to-head goals scored: Probiy Horodenka 12 +3 5, Feniks-Mariupol 10 +3 5, Viktoriya Sumy 4 -3 6, UCSA Tarasivka 4 -3 2)	
9	Feniks-Mariupol	30	9	9	12	31	32	−1	36	
10	Viktoriya Sumy	30	10	6	14	37	38	−1	36	
11	UCSA Tarasivka	30	10	6	14	30	40	−10	36	
12	Nyva Ternopil	30	8	10	12	24	34	−10	34	
13	Chernihiv	30	8	7	15	30	36	−6	31	
14	Vorskla Poltava (W)	30	7	9	14	23	36	−13	30	Denied license
15	Podillya Khmelnytskyi (R)	30	4	9	17	20	45	−25	21	Relegation to Ukrainian Second League
16	Metalurh Zaporizhzhia (R)	30	4	7	19	16	61	−45	19	Relegation to Ukrainian Second League

Source: PFL.ua
Rules for classification: 1) Points; 2) Head-to-head points; 3) Head-to-head goal difference; 4) Head-to-head goals scored; 5) Goal difference in all games; 6) Goals scored in all games (Note: calculation by criteria indicated in rules 2, 3, 4 is conducted with consideration of all teams that have an equal number of tournament points at the moment of calculation and not only among those which after preliminary criteria have appeared more successful).
(C) Champions; (O) Relegation play-offs winner; (P) Promoted; (R) Relegated; (W) Denied license for the next season

==== Results summary ====
Overall								Home						Away					
Pld	W	D	L	GF	GA	GD	Pts	W	D	L	GF	GA	GD	W	D	L	GF	GA	GD
30	19	8	3	44	20	+24	65	11	3	1	23	3	+20	8	5	2	21	17	+4

Last updated: 1 June 2026.
Source: Soccerway
Note: Control and Disciplinary Committee of the UAF has awarded Nyva Ternopil a technical defeat (0–3) in the 1st round match of the Ukrainian First League against Chornomorets Odesa.

==== Results by round ====
Round	1	2	3	4	5	6	7	8	9	10	11	12	13	14	15	16	17	18	19	20	21	22	23	24	25	26	27	28	29	30
Ground	H	A	H	A	H	H	A	H	A	H	A	H	A	H	A	A	H	A	H	A	A	H	A	H	A	H	A	H	A	H
Result	W	W	D	W	W	W	W	W	W	D	D	W	D	L	D	W	W	L	W	D	W	W	W	W	L	W	D	D	W	W
Position	4	1	1	1	1	1	1	1	1	1	2	2	2	2	2	2	2	3	2	2	2	2	2	2	2	2	2	2	2	2
Points	3	6	7	10	13	16	19	22	25	26	27	30	31	31	32	35	38	38	41	42	45	48	51	54	54	57	58	59	62	65
Head coach / Kucher	x	x	x	x	x	x	x	x	x	x	x	x	x	x	x	x	x	x												
Head coach / Hryhorchuk																			x	x	x	x	x	x	x	x	x	x	x	x

Updated to match(es) played on 1 June 2026. Source: Match protocols.
A = Away; H = Home; W = Win; D = Draw; L = Loss

==== Score overview ====
Win Draw Loss

Opposition	Home score	Away score	Aggregate score	Double
Ahrobiznes Volochysk	1–0	2–1	3–1	Yes
Bukovyna Chernivtsi	1–2	3–1	4–3	No
FC Chernihiv	1–0	2–2	3–2	No
Feniks-Mariupol	2–0	1–1	3–1	No
Inhulets Petrove	2–0	3–2	5–2	Yes
Livyi Bereh	0–0	1–1	1–1	No
Metalist Kharkiv	1–0	1–1	2–1	No
Metalurh Zaporizhzhia	3–0	1–0	4–0	Yes
Nyva Ternopil	3–0; ~~2–1~~	1–0	4–0	Yes
Podillya Khmelnytskyi	4–1	2–0	6–1	Yes
Probiy Horodenka	1–0	2–0	3–0	Yes
Prykarpattia-Blaho	3–0	1–1	4–1	No
UCSA Tarasivka	1–0	1–0	2–0	Yes
Viktoriya Sumy	0–0	0–4	0–4	No
Vorskla Poltava	0–0	0–3	0–3	No

Last updated: April 2026.
Source: Soccerway
Note: Control and Disciplinary Committee of the UAF has awarded Nyva Ternopil a technical defeat (0–3) in the 1st round match of the Ukrainian First League against Chornomorets Odesa.

==== Matches ====
The league fixtures were announced on 4 July 2025.
Win Draw Loss

2 August 2025 1	Chornomorets	3–0; ~~2–1~~	Nyva Ternopil	Odesa, Ukraine
16:30 EEST (UTC+03:00)	Sklyar 51'; I. Kohut 77'; Romanyuk (yellow card) 80'	Report	Tlumak (yellow card) 41'; Palamarchuk (yellow card) 74'; Posyevkin (yellow card) 83'; Haladey 90+1'	Stadium: Chornomorets; Attendance: 1,415; Referee: Y. Kevlich (Kropyvnytskyi)
Note: Protocol, Vlog, Starting captain (Note: Starting captain of the Chornomorets Odesa in the domestic league this season.) - Y. Rakitskyi (1) (Note: Number of matches as starting captain in the domestic league this season.), Kit (Note: Kit of the Chornomorets Odesa.) - Home colours

10 August 2025 2	Podillya Khmelnytskyi	0–2	Chornomorets	Khmelnytskyi, Ukraine
13:45 EEST (UTC+03:00)		Report	Rakitskyi 11'; Ryazantsev 90+2'	Stadium: SC Podillya; Attendance: 987; Referee: P. Pleshko (Kremenchuk)
Note: Protocol, Vlog, Starting captain - Y. Rakitskyi (2), Kit - Home colours

16 August 2025 3	Chornomorets	0–0	Vorskla Poltava	Odesa, Ukraine
17:00 EEST (UTC+03:00)		Report		Stadium: Chornomorets; Attendance: 1,500; Referee: D. Osaulenko (Kyiv)
Note: Protocol, Vlog, Starting captain - Y. Rakitskyi (3), Kit - Home colours

29 August 2025 4	UCSA Tarasivka	0–1	Chornomorets	Bucha, Ukraine
13:00 EEST (UTC+03:00)		Report	Sabiev 43' (o.g.)	Stadium: Yuvileinyi; Attendance: 500; Referee: S. Lapko (Lviv)
Note: Protocol, Vlog, Starting captain - Y. Rakitskyi (4), Kit - Home colours

7 September 2025 5	Chornomorets	2–0	Feniks-Mariupol	Odesa, Ukraine
16:00 EEST (UTC+03:00)	Sklyar 65'; Khoblenko 80'	Report		Stadium: Chornomorets; Attendance: 1,500; Referee: I. Stashuk (Chernihiv)
Note: Protocol, Vlog, Starting captain - Y. Rakitskyi (5), Kit - Home colours

13 September 2025 6	Chornomorets	3–0	Metalurh Zaporizhzhia	Odesa, Ukraine
16:00 EEST (UTC+03:00)	Khoblenko 61' 70' 72'	Report		Stadium: Chornomorets; Attendance: 1,500; Referee: A. Ukhov (Kryvyi Rih)
Note: Protocol, Vlog, Starting captain - Y. Rakitskyi (6), Kit - Home colours

20 September 2025 7	Inhulets Petrove	2–3	Chornomorets	Petrove, Ukraine
12:30 EEST (UTC+03:00)	Benedyuk 37'; Malysh (penalty missed) 45' (pen.); Faraseenko 82'	Report	Herych 11'; Kyslenko 64' (o.g.); Hernández 73'	Stadium: Inhulets; Attendance: 200; Referee: O. Tytov (Donezk)
Note: Protocol, Vlog, Starting captain - Y. Rakitskyi (7), Kit - Home colours

28 September 2025 8	Chornomorets	1–0	Ahrobiznes Volochysk	Odesa, Ukraine
16:30 EEST (UTC+03:00)	Herych 49'	Report		Stadium: Chornomorets; Attendance: 1,500; Referee: M. Firsov (Rivne)
Note: Protocol, Vlog, Starting captain - Y. Rakitskyi (8), Kit - Home colours

4 October 2025 9	Probiy Horodenka	0–2	Chornomorets	Horodenka, Ukraine
13:00 EEST (UTC+03:00)		Report	Yermakov 35'; M. Kohut 62'	Stadium: Probiy Arena; Attendance: 1,150; Referee: S. Prychyna (Zhovtantsi)
Note: Protocol, Vlog, Starting captain - Y. Rakitskyi (9), Kit - Home colours

9 October 2025 10	Chornomorets	0–0	Viktoriya Sumy	Odesa, Ukraine
14:30 EEST (UTC+03:00)		Report		Stadium: Chornomorets; Attendance: 876; Referee: P. Detsiuk (Chernihiv)
Note: Protocol, Vlog, Starting captain - Y. Rakitskyi (10), Kit - Home colours

13 October 2025 11	Prykarpattia-Blaho	1–1	Chornomorets	Ivano-Frankivsk, Ukraine
13:30 EEST (UTC+03:00)	Chushenko 71'	Report	Kulach 13'	Stadium: Rukh; Attendance: 500; Referee: N. Bohatyr (Zaporizhzhia)
Note: Protocol, Vlog, Starting captain - V. Yermakov (1), Kit - Home colours

19 October 2025 12	Chornomorets	1–0	FC Chernihiv	Odesa, Ukraine
15:30 EEST (UTC+03:00)	Ryce 41'	Report		Stadium: Chornomorets; Attendance: 1,500; Referee: Y. Kevlich (Kropyvnytskyi)
Note: Protocol, Vlog, Starting captain - Y. Rakitskyi (11), Kit - Home colours

26 October 2025 13	Livyi Bereh	1–1	Chornomorets	Kyiv Oblast, Ukraine
14:00 EET (UTC+02:00)	Vorobchak 25'	Report	Rakitskyi 38'	Stadium: Arena Livyi Bereh; Attendance: 597; Referee: S. Podryhulya (Lutsk)
Note: Protocol, Vlog, Starting captain - Y. Rakitskyi (12), Kit - Home colours

2 November 2025 14	Chornomorets	1–2	Bukovyna Chernivtsi	Odesa, Ukraine
16:00 EET (UTC+02:00)	Kulach 68'	Report	Boychuk 9'; Pidlepenets 27'	Stadium: Chornomorets; Attendance: 1,500; Referee: I. Salash (Kalush)
Note: Protocol, Vlog, Starting captain - Y. Rakitskyi (13), Kit - Home colours

8 November 2025 15	Metalist Kharkiv	1–1	Chornomorets	Uzhhorod, Ukraine
13:00 EET (UTC+02:00)	Bahachanskyi 24'	Report	Porokh 47' (o.g.)	Stadium: Avanhard; Attendance: 180; Referee: I. Stashuk (Chernihiv)
Note: Protocol, Vlog, Starting captain - A. Habelok (1), Kit - Away colours

16 November 2025 16	Nyva Ternopil	0–1	Chornomorets	Ternopil, Ukraine
14:30 EET (UTC+02:00)		Report	Rakitskyi 12'	Stadium: Roman Shukhevych stadium Attendance: 400; Referee: D. Osaulenko (Kyiv)
Note: Protocol, Vlog, Starting captain - Y. Rakitskyi (14), Kit - Away colours

22 November 2025 17	Chornomorets	4–1	Podillya Khmelnytskyi	Odesa, Ukraine
14:00 EET (UTC+02:00)	I. Kohut 42'; Robakidze 47'; Hernández 52' 74'	Report	Shavrin 82'	Stadium: Chornomorets; Attendance: 1,500; Referee: M. Skrypnyk (Kyiv Oblast)
Note: Protocol, Vlog, Starting captain - Y. Rakitskyi (15), Kit - Home colours

29 November 2025 18	Vorskla Poltava	3–0	Chornomorets	Poltava, Ukraine
14:00 EET (UTC+02:00)	Andrushchenko 2'; Prikhna 11'; Korablin 62'	Report		Stadium: Butovsky Vorskla Stadium; Attendance: 365; Referee: A. Zaitsev (Donetsk Oblast)
Note: Protocol, Vlog, Starting captain - Y. Rakitskyi (16), Kit - Home colours

21 March 2026 19	Chornomorets	1–0	UCSA Tarasivka	Odesa, Ukraine
16:00 EET (UTC+02:00)	Khoblenko 70'	Report		Stadium: Chornomorets; Attendance: 1,480; Referee: I. Stashuk (Chernihiv)
Note: Protocol, Vlog, Starting captain - O. Khoblenko (1), Kit - Home colours

28 March 2026 20	Feniks-Mariupol	1–1	Chornomorets	Lviv, Ukraine
15:00 EET (UTC+02:00)	Balan 68'	Report	Popov 40'	Stadium: SKIF; Attendance: 370; Referee: D. Osaulenko (Kyiv)
Note: Protocol, Vlog, Starting captain - O. Khoblenko (2), Kit - Away colours

3 April 2026 21	Metalurh Zaporizhzhia	0–1	Chornomorets	Zaporizhzhia, Ukraine
13:00 EEST (UTC+03:00)		Report	Khoma 45+3'	Stadium: Slavutych Arena; Attendance: 300; Referee: Y. Kevlich (Kropyvnytskyi)
Note: Protocol, Vlog, Starting captain - O. Sklyar (1), Kit - Third colours

8 April 2026 22	Chornomorets	2–0	Inhulets Petrove	Odesa, Ukraine
17:00 EET (UTC+02:00)	Klymenko 65'; Herych 88'	Report		Stadium: Chornomorets; Attendance: 1,500; Referee: M. Skrypnyk (Kyiv Oblast)
Note: Protocol, Vlog, Starting captain - V. Klymenko (1), Kit - Home colours

12 April 2026 23	Ahrobiznes Volochysk	1–2	Chornomorets	Volochysk, Ukraine
16:00 EEST (UTC+03:00)	Kuzmyn 90+4'	Report	Yermakov 7'; Khoma 90+3'	Stadium: Yunist; Attendance: 550; Referee: I. Salash (Kalush)
Note: Protocol, Vlog, Starting captain - O. Sklyar (2), Kit - Home colours

18 April 2026 24	Chornomorets	1–0	Probiy Horodenka	Odesa, Ukraine
16:30 EET (UTC+02:00)	Herych 88'	Report		Stadium: Chornomorets; Attendance: 1,500; Referee: O. Tytov (Donezk)
Note: Protocol, Vlog, Starting captain - O. Sklyar (3), Kit - Home colours

26 April 2026 25	Viktoriya Sumy	4–0	Chornomorets	Trostyanets, Ukraine
12:00 EEST (UTC+03:00)	Vasylyev 1'; Shpyryonok 54' 64'; Ulyanov 89'	Report		Stadium: Kuts Stadium; Attendance: 0 Referee: I. Stashuk (Chernihiv)
Note: Protocol, Vlog, Starting captain - O. Sklyar (4), Kit - Third colours

3 May 2026 26	Chornomorets	3–0	Prykarpattia-Blaho	Odesa, Ukraine
15:00 EET (UTC+02:00)	Herych 44' 55'; Khoma 47'	Report		Stadium: Chornomorets; Attendance: 1,485; Referee: P. Detsiuk (Chernihiv)
Note: Protocol, Vlog, Starting captain - O. Sklyar (5), Kit - Home colours

9 May 2026 27	FC Chernihiv	2–2	Chornomorets	Chernihiv, Ukraine
12:00 EEST (UTC+03:00)	Romanchenko 14'; Bezborodko 46'; Kartushov (yellow card) 73'	Report	Khoma 31'; Klymenko (yellow card) 45'; Yermakov 76'	Stadium: Chernihiv Arena; Attendance: 300; Referee: S. Lapko (Lviv)
Note: Protocol, Vlog, Starting captain - O. Sklyar (6), Kit - Home colours

16 May 2026 28	Chornomorets	0–0	Livyi Bereh	Odesa, Ukraine
16:30 EET (UTC+02:00)		Report		Stadium: Chornomorets; Attendance: 2,850; Referee: R. Blavatsky (Lviv)
Note: Protocol, Vlog, Starting captain - O. Sklyar (7), Kit - Home colours

23 May 2026 29	Bukovyna Chernivtsi	1–3	Chornomorets	Chernivtsi, Ukraine
13:00 EEST (UTC+03:00)	Dakhnovskyi 42' (pen.)	Report	I. Kohut 3'; Herych 50'; Farasyeyenko 90+1'	Stadium: Bukovyna; Attendance: 5,594; Referee: O. Kohut (Ternopil)
Note: Protocol, Vlog, Starting captain - O. Sklyar (8), Kit - Home colours

1 June 2026 30	Chornomorets	1–0	Metalist Kharkiv	Odesa, Ukraine
13:00 EET (UTC+02:00)	Herych 63' (pen.)	Report		Stadium: Chornomorets; Attendance: 2,330; Referee: A. Mykhailiuk (Kyiv)
Note: Protocol, Vlog, Starting captain - V. Yermakov (2), Kit - Home colours

=== Ukrainian Cup ===
Win Draw Loss Fixtures

23 August 2025 Round of 64	Chornomorets	2–1	Zorya Luhansk	Odesa, Ukraine
13:00 EEST (UTC+03:00)	Lopyryonok 11'; Khoblenko 77'	Report	Budkivskyi 50'	Stadium: Chornomorets; Attendance: 1,500; Referee: D. Osaulenko (Kyiv)
Note: Protocol, Vlog, Starting captain (Note: Starting captain of the Chornomorets Odesa in the domestic cup this season.) - Y. Rakitskyi (1) (Note: Number of matches as starting captain in the domestic cup this season.), Kit - Home colours

24 September 2025 Round of 32	Ahrotekh Tyshkivka	1–1 (5–3 p)	Chornomorets	Tyshkivka, Ukraine
13:40 EEST (UTC+03:00)	Pastukhov 18'	Report	Hernández 73' (pen.)	Stadium: Litsey Arena; Attendance: 500; Referee: A. Zaitsev (Donetsk Oblast)
	Penalties
	Zagalsky (penalty scored); Kovalenko (penalty scored); Kovalev (penalty scored); Chichikov (penalty scored); Pastukhov (penalty scored)		(penalty scored) Gabelok; (penalty scored) Kulach; (penalty missed) Hernández; (penalty scored) Kratov
Note: Protocol, Vlog, Starting captain - V. Yermakov (1), Kit - Home colours

== Statistics ==
- Team statistics for the season 2025–26 (in Ukrainian)

=== Clean sheets ===
The list is sorted by squad number when total clean sheets are equal.

Rank	No.	Player	Domestic League	Domestic Cup	Total
1	12	(Nigeria) Chijioke Aniagboso	16 (Note: The match against Nyva Ternopil on August 2, 2025 was not included in the statistics, as the result of 3–0 was only achieved through a decision by the Control and Disciplinary Committee of the Ukrainian Football Federation.)	0	16
2	35	(Ukraine) Maksym Koval	1	0	1
Totals			17	0	17

Source: Match protocols.
