= Zboriv =

City in Ternopil Oblast, Ukraine

Zboriv Зборів
- City
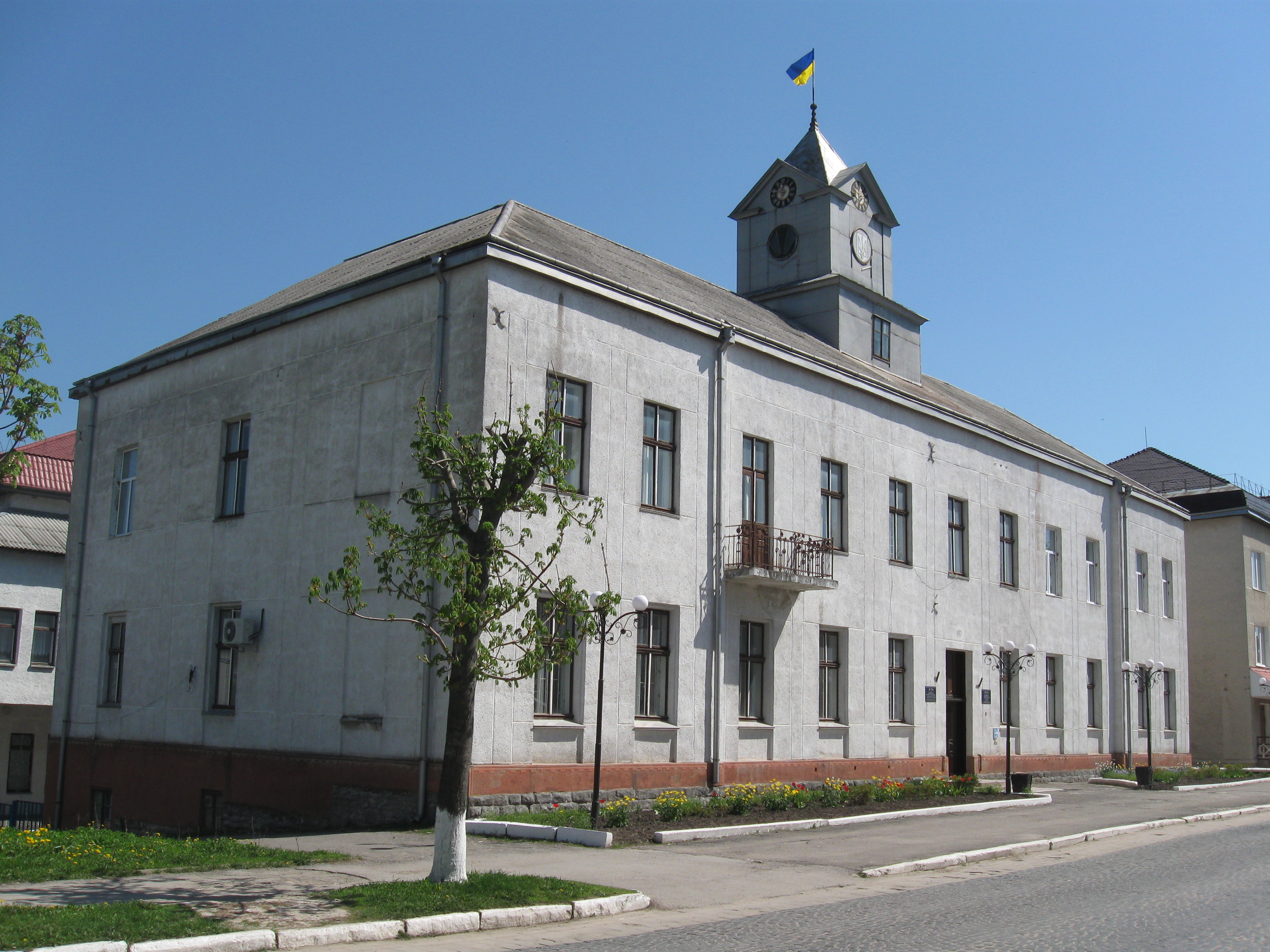
- City hall

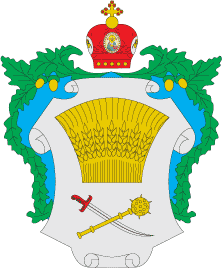
- Flag Seal
- Interactive map of Zboriv
- Location of Zboriv in Ukraine Zboriv (Ukraine)
- Coordinates: 49°40′N 25°09′E
- Country: Ukraine
- Oblast: Ternopil Oblast
- Raion: Ternopil Raion
- Hromada: Zboriv urban hromada
- First mentioned: 1166

Population (2022)
  - Total: 6,621
- Time zone: UTC+2 (EET)
  - Summer (DST): UTC+3 (EEST)

Zboriv (Ukrainian: Зборів, IPA: [ˈzbɔr⁽ʲ⁾iu̯]; Polish: Zborów; Yiddish: זבאָרעוו, romanized: Zbarev; Russian: Зборов, romanized: Zborov) is a small city in Ternopil Raion, Ternopil Oblast, western Ukraine. It is located in the historical region of Galicia. The local government is administered by Zboriv City Council. Zboriv hosts the administration of Zboriv urban hromada, one of the hromadas of Ukraine. Population: 6,621 (2022 estimate).

Located 35 km (22 mi) northwest of Ternopil, and 85 km (53 mi) southeast of Lviv, the town lies on the Strypa River (Ukrainian: Cтpипа) in the western part of the historical region of Podolia.

== History ==
Zboriv was mentioned for the first time in a document from 1166. In 1241, during the Mongol invasion of Europe, it was ransacked and destroyed. The city's present name comes from the noble Polish family of Zborowscy. In 1639, Zboriv was granted city rights. Ten years later, during the Khmelnytsky Uprising, it was the site of a battle between Polish troops and a Tatar-Cossack army. During the late 18th century a Baroque church was erected in the town.

Under the Austrian rule Zboriv served as a district centre. In 1913 it had about 6000 inhabitants, including 2400 Ukrainians, 1300 Poles and 2300 Jews. During World War I, in June 1917 the town's vicinity was the site of heavy fighting between the Czechoslovak legionnaires and the Austrian Army Battle. After the Polish-Ukrainian War of 1918-1919, Zboriv became part of Poland and was the seat of a powiat of the Tarnopol Voivodeship. In 1931 the town had a population of about 5,000 inhabitants.

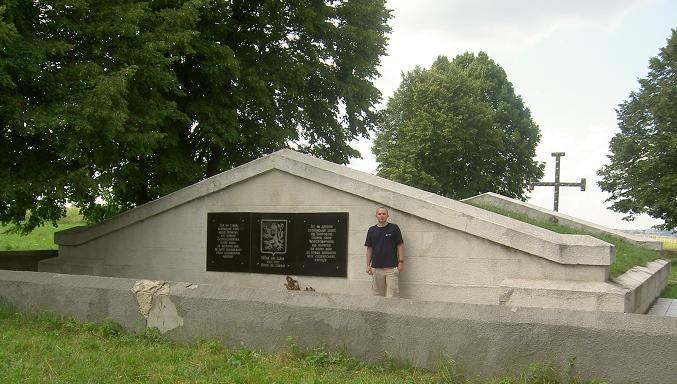
Memorial of the Czechoslovak Legion in Battle of Zboriv, 1917

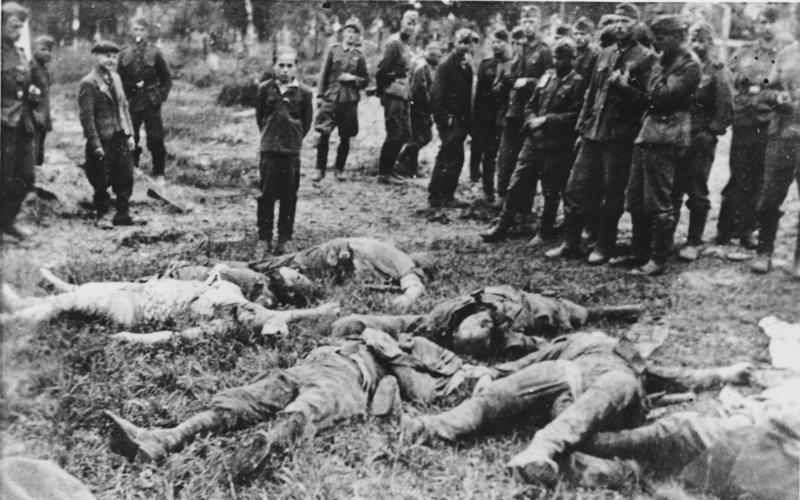
A teenage boy views his murdered family shortly before his own death. Zboriv, Ukraine, 5 July 1941

On 18 September 1939 Red Army units captured Zboriv, as a result of which the town was annexed into the Soviet Union as part of the Ukrainian SSR.

In 1941, during World War II, Zboriv was the site of a mass murder conducted by Germans of the Einsatzgruppen, along with local Ukrainians. Information about the Jewish community destroyed during the Holocaust can be found in a Yizkor book published by Jews who fled Zborow and survived the Holocaust.

The town was completely destroyed in the summer of 1944 due to the Soviet offensive. Under Soviet rule (1944–1991), Zboriv was rebuilt and redeveloped. Construction plant and a small food processing factory were built in the 1960s. A significant part of the local budget relied on agriculture and governmental subsidies. The state farm in Zboriv was one of the best in the region. In the 1980s, the town became the object of serious governmental investments. Among these few new town improvements were built, like: cinema, agricultural market, new secondary school, waterbike lake station, football stadium, a city hall and a culture hall.

After the collapse of the Soviet Union, the local economy experienced a deep downturn. During the 1990s (until present time) as a result of economic decline many working-age people emigrated - mostly as a low-skilled labourers in Western Europe or Russia. Nowadays, in spite of the unfavorable conditions, the younger generation is less likely to quit and prefer to commute daily to work in the larger cities Ternopil and Lviv, which offer wider job opportunities.

Until 18 July 2020, Zboriv was the administrative center of Zboriv Raion. The raion was abolished in July 2020 as part of the administrative reform of Ukraine, which reduced the number of raions of Ternopil Oblast to three. The area of Zboriv Raion was merged into Ternopil Raion.

== Demographics ==
As of the 2001 Ukrainian census, Zboriv had a population of 7,339 people. The population consisted almost entirely of ethnic Ukrainians. The exact ethnic composition was as follows:

Ethnic groups in Zboriv
	percent
Ukrainians	99.13%
Russians	0.55%
others	0.32%

== Gallery ==
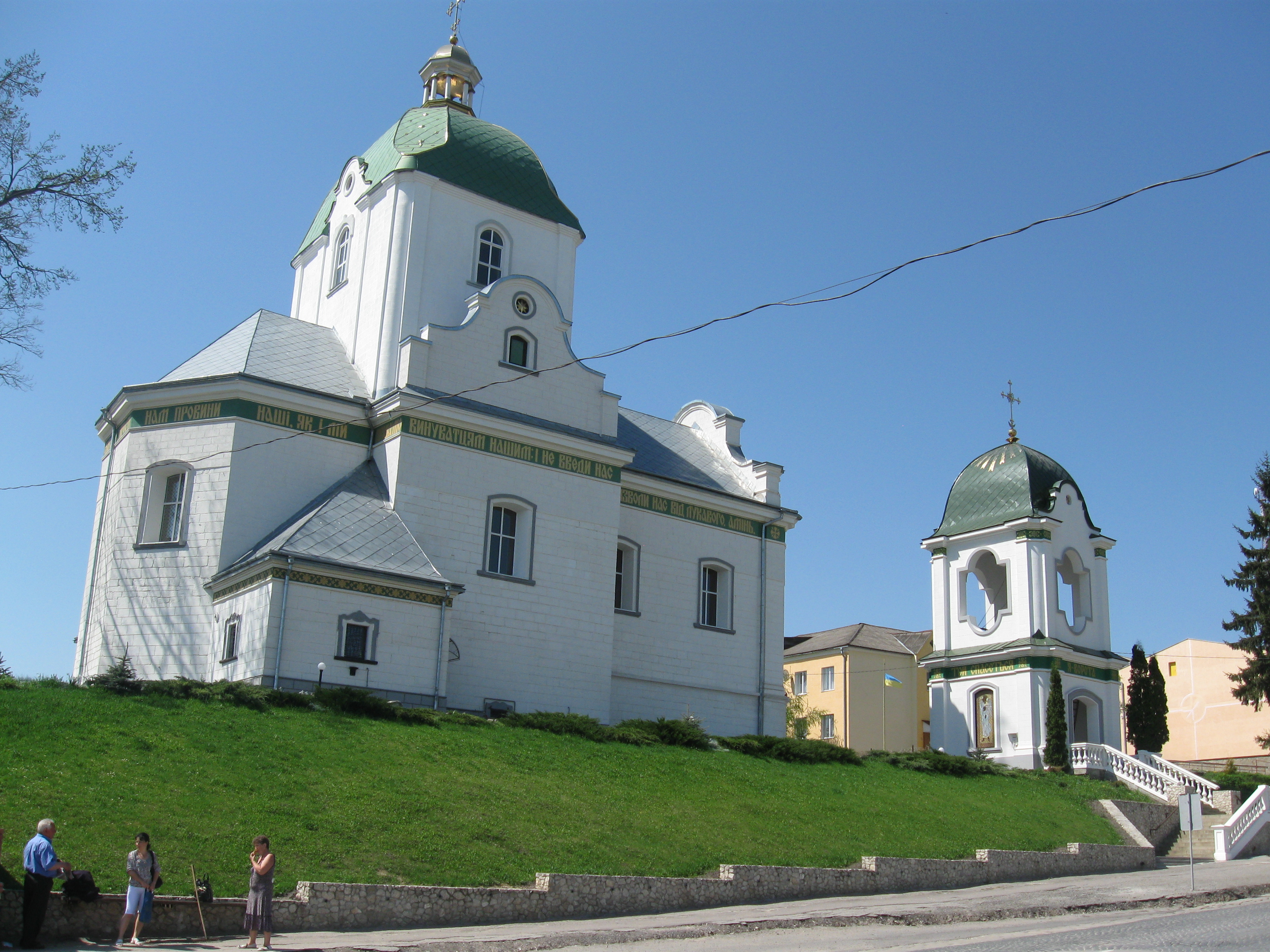
Church of New Martyrs of Ukrainian People (Orthodox)

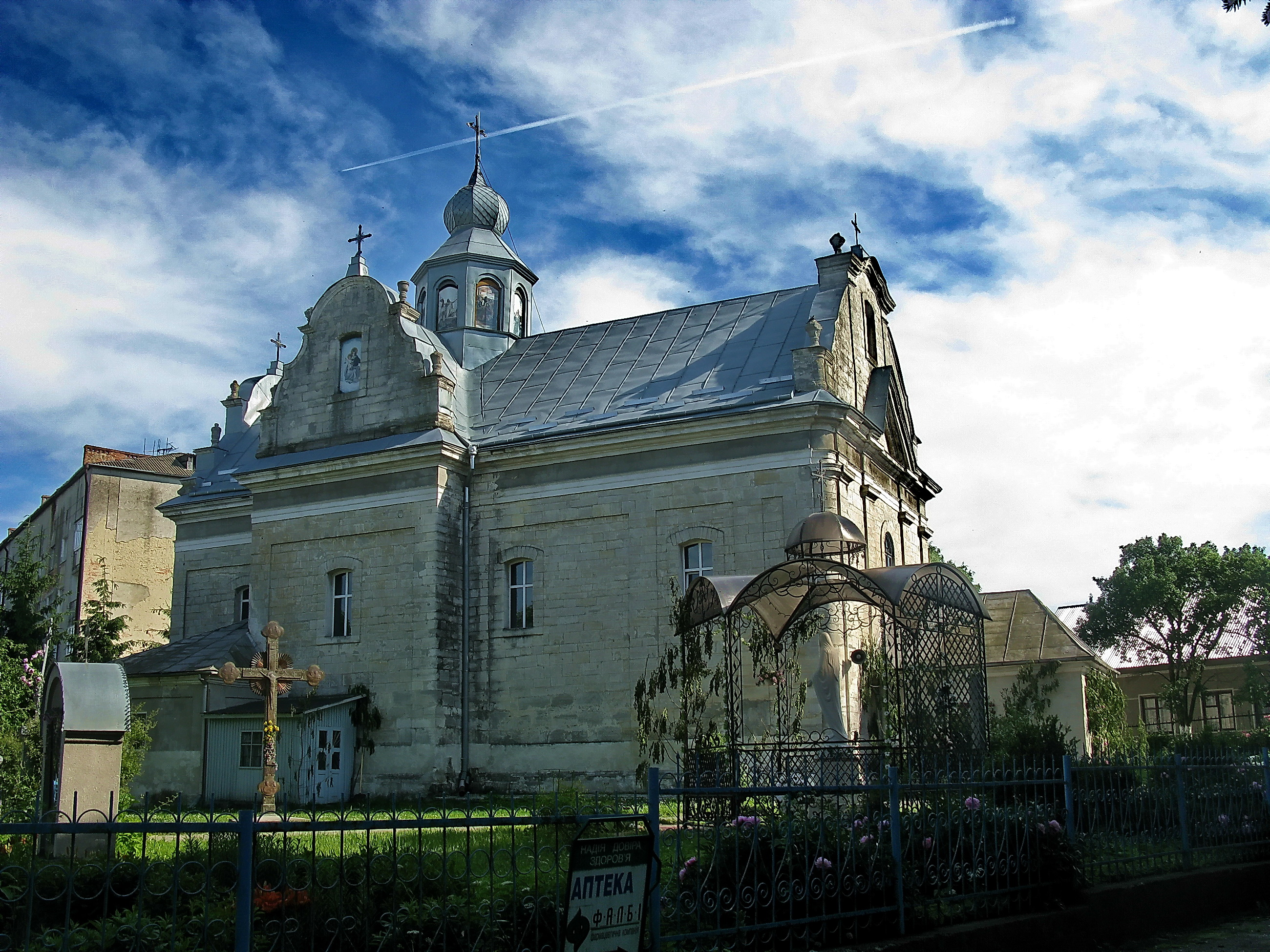
Transfiguration Church (Catholic)

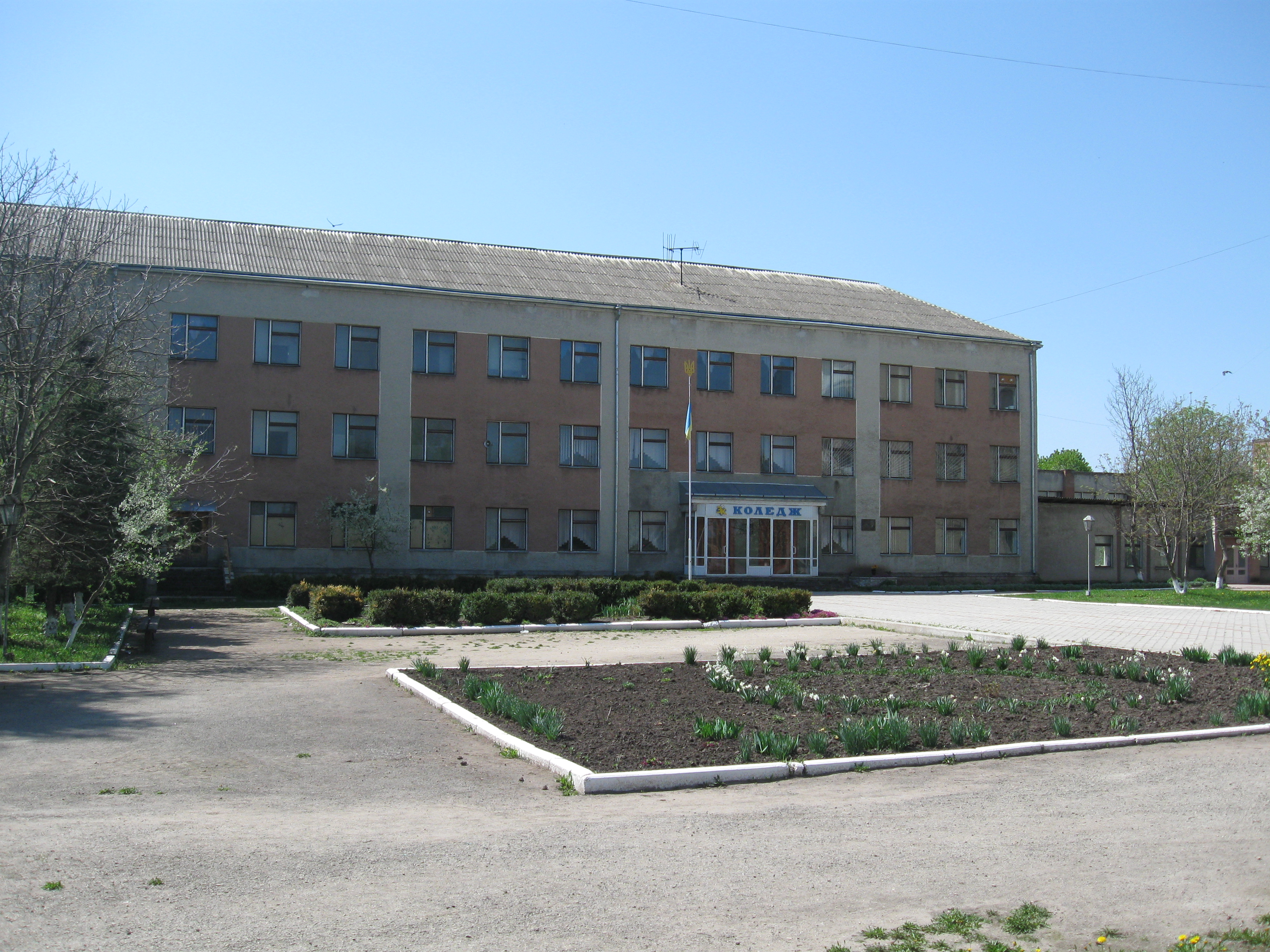
College

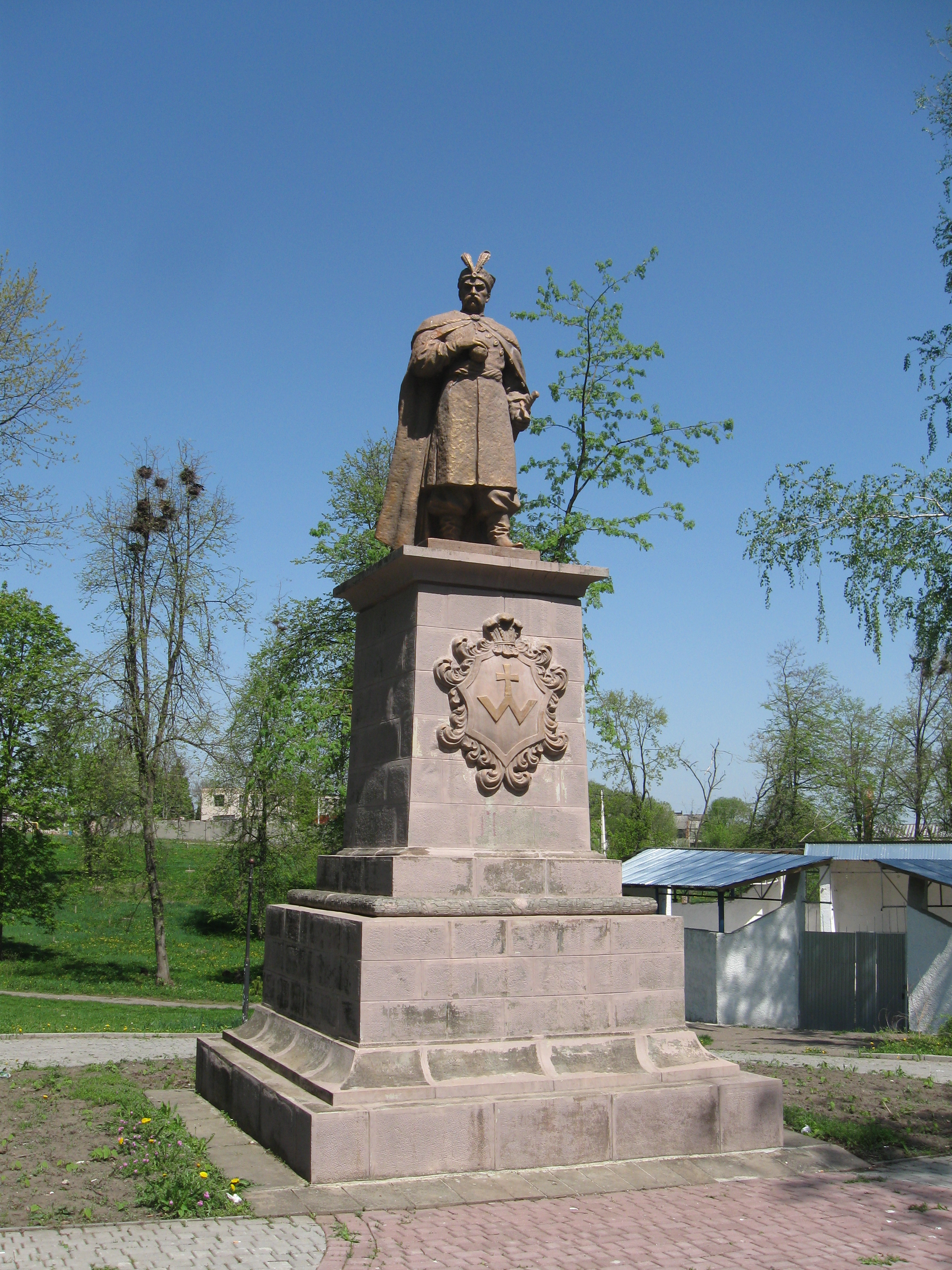
Bohdan Khmelnytskyi monument

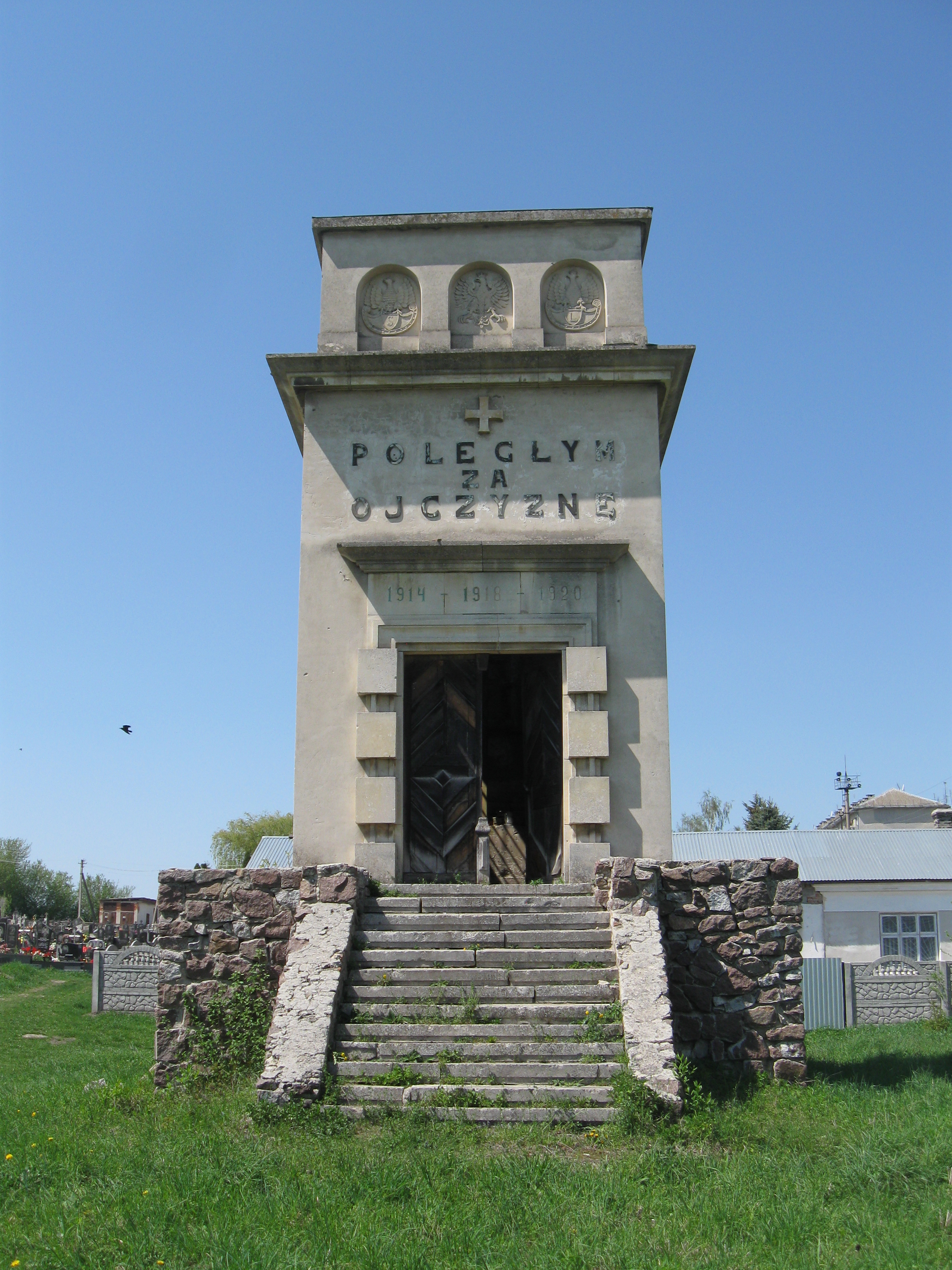
Polish-Soviet War monument

== Notable people ==
- Raphael Zaborovsky (1677–1747), Russian Orthodox bishop
- Mykola Skorodynskyi (1751–1805), Ukrainian Greek Catholic hierarch
- Milena Rudnytska (1892–1976), Ukrainian educator, women's activist, politician and writer
- Roman Pokora (1948–2021), Ukrainian football player
- Volodymyr Shandra (born 1963), Ukrainian politician and former Governor of Kyiv Oblast
- Andrii Sybiha (born 1975), Ukrainian diplomat
- Ihor Kurylo (born 1993), Ukrainian football player
- Sviatoslav Dziadykevych (born 1995), Ukrainian football player
- Ivan Kohut (born 1998), Ukrainian football player
- Mykola Kohut (born 1998), Ukrainian football player

== See also ==
- Battle of Zboriv (1649)
- Treaty of Zboriv (1649)
- Battle of Zboriv (1917)
- Einsatzgruppen
