= Maksym Boyko =

Ukrainian footballer

Personal information
- Full name: Maksym Anatoliyovych Boyko
- Date of birth: 27 May 2004 (age 22)
- Place of birth: Nedryhailiv, Ukraine
- Position: Central midfielder

Team information
- Current team: FC Zorya Luhansk
- Number: 18

Youth career
- 2014–: Barsa Sumy

Senior career*
Years	Team	Apps	(Gls)
2020–2021	Alians-2 Lypova Dolyna	9	(5)
2021	Ukraina Tokari	0	(0)
2021–2023	Alians Lypova Dolyna	2	(0)
2023–26	Viktoriya Sumy	45	(3)
2026–	FC Zorya Luhansk	4	(1)
- * Club domestic league appearances and goals as of 14 October 2026 @ 15:25(AEST)

Maksym Anatoliyovych Boyko (Ukrainian: Максим Анатолійович Бойко; born 27 May 2004) is a Ukrainian professional footballer who plays as a central midfielder for Ukrainian club Zorya Luhansk.
