= Artur Avahimyan =

Ukrainian footballer (born 1997)

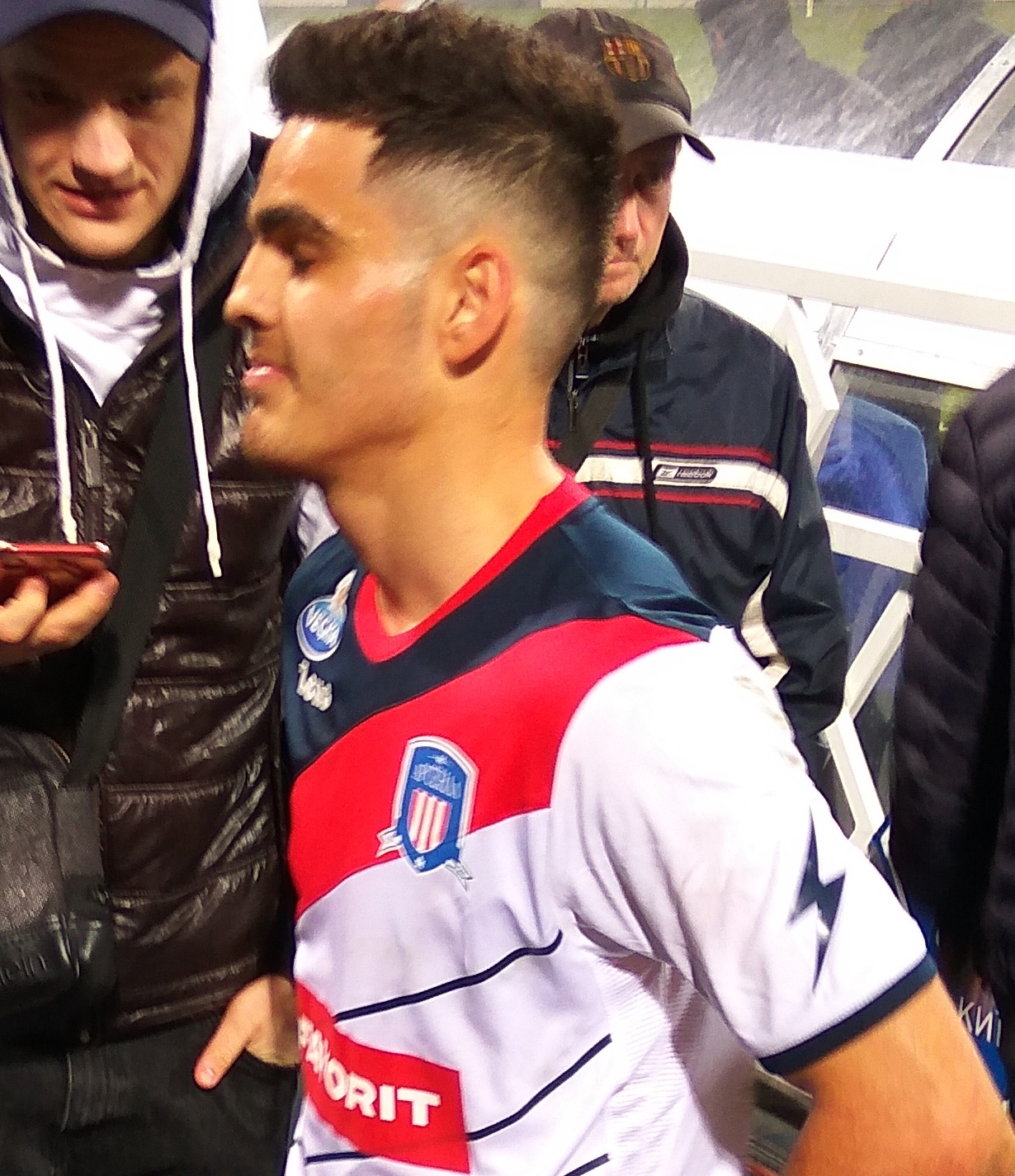
- Avahimyan with Arsenal Kyiv in 2019

Personal information
- Full name: Artur Samvelovych Avahimyan
- Date of birth: 16 January 1997 (age 29)
- Place of birth: Mariupol, Ukraine
- Height: 1.71 m (5 ft 7 in)
- Position: Midfielder

Team information
- Current team: Chornomorets Odesa
- Number: 10

Youth career
- 2009–2011: Illichivets Mariupol
- 2012–2014: Shakhtar Donetsk

Senior career*
Years	Team	Apps	(Gls)
2014–2017	Shakhtar Donetsk	0	(0)
2017	→ Illichivets Mariupol (loan)	1	(0)
2017	→ Illichivets-2 Mariupol (loan)	10	(1)
2017–2018	Mariupol	3	(0)
2019	Arsenal Kyiv	8	(2)
2019	Alashkert	1	(0)
2020–2022	Chornomorets Odesa	55	(12)
2022–2024	Oleksandriya	11	(0)
2023	→ Chornomorets Odesa (loan)	12	(0)
2023–2024	→ Chornomorets Odesa (loan)	24	(5)
2024–2025	LNZ Cherkasy	16	(0)
2026–	Chornomorets Odesa	8	(0)

International career
2012–2013	Ukraine U16	13	(7)
2013–2014	Ukraine U17	8	(6)
2014	Ukraine U18	6	(5)
2016	Ukraine U19	9	(7)
- * Club domestic league appearances and goals as of 2 August 2026

Artur Samvelovych Avahimyan (Ukrainian: Артур Самвелович Авагімян; born 16 January 1997) is a Ukrainian professional footballer who plays as a midfielder for Ukrainian club Chornomorets Odesa.

== Career ==
Avahimyan is of Armenian descent. He is a product of the FC Mariupol and FC Shakhtar youth sportive schools.

In February 2017 he went on loan for the Ukrainian First League club FC Illichivets Mariupol. His career continued, when he finished on loan playing and signed in June 2017 a 2 years deal with FC Mariupol (former FC Illichivets), that was promoted to the Ukrainian Premier League. On 3 February 2020, Avahimyan joined Chornomorets Odesa.

He spend the last of 2022-2023 season on loan at FC Chornomorets Odesa from Oleksandriya, and in August 2023 he moved back to FC Chornomorets Odesa on a loan-deal for the 2023-24 season.

On 20 August 2024, Avahimyan joined Ukrainian Premier League side LNZ Cherkasy.

On 29 January 2026, he left LNZ Cherkasy and for the fourth time in his career joined Chornomorets Odesa. As a player for Chornomorets in the 2025–26 season, he made his official debut against UCSA Tarasivka on 21 March 2026.

== Honours ==
Chornomorets Odesa

- Ukrainian First League runner-up: 2025–26
