= Vladyslav Herych =

Ukrainian footballer

Personal information
- Full name: Vladyslav Volodymyrovych Herych
- Date of birth: 7 November 2005 (age 20)
- Place of birth: Lviv, Ukraine
- Height: 1.80 m (5 ft 11 in)
- Position: Forward

Team information
- Current team: Chornomorets Odesa (on loan from Dynamo Kyiv)
- Number: 77

Youth career
- 2015–2017: Pokrova-Viktoriya Lviv
- 2017–2022: Lviv

Senior career*
Years	Team	Apps	(Gls)
2023	Lviv	3	(0)
2023–	Dynamo Kyiv	0	(0)
2025–	→ Chornomorets Odesa (loan)	24	(8)
- * Club domestic league appearances and goals as of 2 August 2026

Vladyslav Volodymyrovych Herych (Ukrainian: Владислав Володимирович Герич; born 7 November 2005) is a Ukrainian professional footballer who plays as a forward for Ukrainian club Chornomorets Odesa on loan from Dynamo Kyiv.

== Career ==
A native of Lviv, Herych is a graduate of the local Pokrova-Viktoriya football school, from which he entered the Lviv academy. At the Ukrainian Youth Football League, he played 64 matches for Lviv scoring 9 goals. In 2022, after Russia's military invasion of Ukraine, he went to Germany, where he played at the amateur level for a short time, after which he returned to Lviv. In the summer of 2022, Herych joined the U19 team and played 23 matches in the Ukrainian youth championship, scoring 5 goals. In mid-May, he scored once against his peers of Vorskla Poltava (2–1) and of Rukh Lviv (1–2), after which he got a chance to debut in the Ukrainian Premier League.

=== Lviv ===
In May 2023, the head coach of the first team Anatoliy Bezsmertnyi gave the opportunity to test their strength at the Ukrainian Premier League level in the Lviv first team to a group of U-19 players, as the team prematurely lost its chances of retaining its place in the Ukrainian Premier League, and lost a number of players. Herych made his debut in the Ukrainian Premier League at the age of 17 years and 198 days, playing the second half of the match against Chornomorets Odesa (0–1), after which he came on as a substitute in the matches against Ingulets Petrove (0–2) and Kolos Kovalivka (0–1).

=== Dynamo Kyiv ===
In July 2023, together with teammate Taras Mykhavko, Herych moved to Dynamo Kyiv, where he began playing for the youth team.

=== Chornomorets Odesa ===
On 5 September 2025, Herych joined Chornomorets Odesa, on a loan deal until the end of 2025. As a player for the Sailors, he made his official debut against Feniks-Mariupol on 7 September 2025. On 20 September 2025 in the 7th round match of the Ukrainian First League between Inhulets Petrove and Chornomorets Herych scored his first goal as a player of Chornomorets. In January 2026, he returned to Dynamo Kyiv where he participated in the mid-season training sessions. Despite this, his loan to Chornomorets was extended until the end of the 2025–26 season. In the 22nd round of the Ukrainian First League, in which the Sailors beat Ingulets Petrove 2–0, Herych scored the winning goal, although he initially planned to pass the ball to one of his teammates. In the 2025–26 season, he became the top scorer for FC Chornomorets Odesa.

== Honours ==
Chornomorets Odesa

- Ukrainian First League runner-up: 2025–26
