= Oleksandr Kapliyenko =

Ukrainian footballer

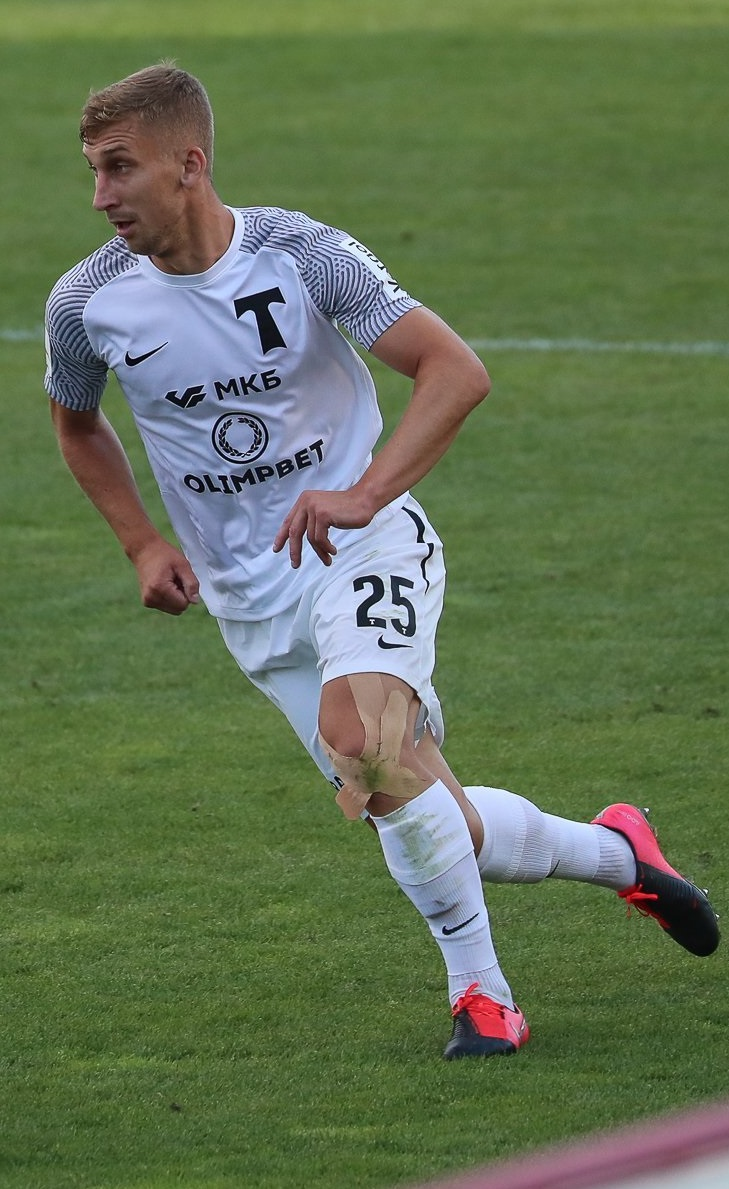
- Kapliyenko with FC Torpedo Moscow in 2021

Personal information
- Full name: Oleksandr Maksymovych Kapliyenko
- Date of birth: 7 March 1996 (age 30)
- Place of birth: Zaporizhzhia, Ukraine
- Height: 1.79 m (5 ft 10 in)
- Position: Left-back

Youth career
- 2009–2013: Metalurh Zaporizhzhia

Senior career*
Years	Team	Apps	(Gls)
2013–2015	Metalurh Zaporizhzhia	35	(4)
2016	Metalist Kharkiv	8	(0)
2016	Alanyaspor	0	(0)
2017	Chornomorets Odesa	14	(0)
2018	Smolevichi	28	(0)
2019	Metalurh Zaporizhzhia	8	(1)
2019	Dinamo Tbilisi	12	(0)
2020	Tambov	25	(0)
2021	Torpedo Moscow	18	(1)
2022	Auda	15	(0)
2022–2023	Metalist Kharkiv	14	(2)
2023	→ Dnipro-1 (loan)	16	(0)
2024–2025	LNZ Cherkasy	19	(0)
2026	Chornomorets Odesa	6	(0)

International career
2012	Ukraine U-17	1	(0)
2013–2014	Ukraine U-18	4	(0)
2014–2015	Ukraine U-19	3	(0)
2015–2016	Ukraine U-20	2	(0)
- * Club domestic league appearances and goals as of 20 June 2026

Oleksandr Maksymovych Kapliyenko (Ukrainian: Олекса́ндр Макси́мович Капліє́нко; born 7 March 1996) is a Ukrainian professional footballer who plays as a defender.

== Career ==
Kapliyenko is product of youth team system Metalurh Zaporizhzhia.

Made his debut for Metalurh Zaporizhzhia playing a full-time game against Chornomorets Odesa on 6 April 2014 in Ukrainian Premier League.

On 12 December 2016, Kapliyenko joined Chornomorets Odesa.

He made his debut in the Russian Football National League for Torpedo Moscow on 27 February 2021 in a game against SKA-Khabarovsk.

On 26 January 2026, Kapliyenko has left LNZ Cherkasy and joined Chornomorets Odesa for the second time in his career. As a player for Chornomorets in the 2025–26 season, he made his official debut against UCSA Tarasivka on 21 March 2026. Kapliyenko left the team on June 30, 2026.

== Honours ==
Chornomorets Odesa

- Ukrainian First League runner-up: 2025–26
