= Mykola Kohut =

Ukrainian footballer

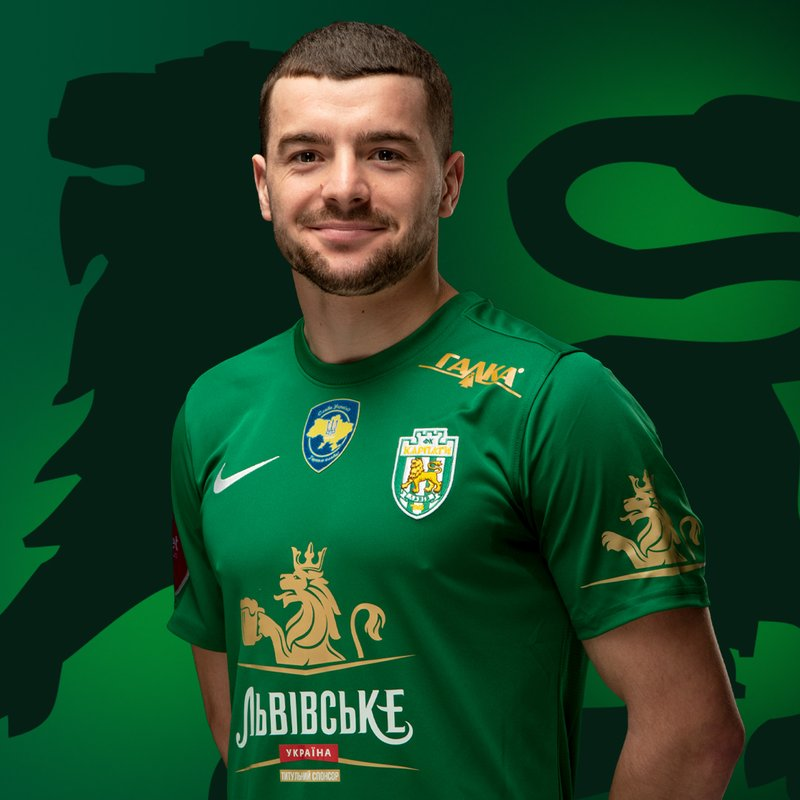

Personal information
- Full name: Mykola Volodymyrovych Kohut
- Date of birth: 31 August 1998 (age 28)
- Place of birth: Zboriv, Ukraine
- Height: 2.10 m (6 ft 11 in)
- Position: Right midfielder

Team information
- Current team: Chornomorets Odesa
- Number: 19

Youth career
- 2013–2014: DYuSSh Zboriv
- 2014–2015: Ternopil
- 2015: Sokil Zolochiv

Senior career*
Years	Team	Apps	(Gls)
2015	Zboriv	0	(0)
2016	Nyva Berezhany	6	(1)
2016–2018	Krystal Chortkiv	50	(11)
2018–2022	Ahrobiznes Volochysk	69	(5)
2022–2023	Karpaty Lviv	17	(0)
2023–2025	Livyi Bereh Kyiv	49	(3)
2025–	Chornomorets Odesa	14	(1)
- * Club domestic league appearances and goals as of 2 August 2026

Mykola Volodymyrovych Kohut (Ukrainian: Микола Володимирович Когут; born 31 August 1998) is a Ukrainian professional footballer who plays as a midfielder for Ukrainian club Chornomorets Odesa.

== Career ==
=== Chornomorets Odesa ===
On 20 June 2025, Mykola Kohut joined Chornomorets Odesa. On 2 August 2025 in the 1st round match of Ukrainian First League between Chornomorets and Nyva Ternopil he made his official debut as a player of Chornomorets. On 4 October 2025 in the 9th round match of the Ukrainian First League 2025–26 between Probiy Horodenka and Chornomorets M. Kohut scored his first goal as player of Chornomorets.

== Honours ==
Chornomorets Odesa

- Ukrainian First League runner-up: 2025–26

== Personal life ==
He is the twin brother of Ivan Kohut who is also a professional footballer.
