= Serhiy Podryhulya =

Ukrainian footballer

Personal information
- Full name: Serhiy Vasylyovych Podryhulya
- Date of birth: 5 February 1992 (age 34)
- Place of birth: Lutsk, Ukraine
- Height: 1.82 m (5 ft 11 1/2 in)
- Position: Midfielder

Youth career
- 2004–2006: FC Volyn Lutsk
- 2006: FC BRV-VIK Volodymyr-Volynskyi
- 2006–2008: FC Volyn Lutsk

Senior career*
Years	Team	Apps	(Gls)
2008–	FC Volyn Lutsk	9	(0)
2010	→FC Spartakus Szarowola	14	(5)
2013–2014	→FC Karlivka	22	(2)

International career^{‡}
2010–2011	Ukraine-19	6	(0)
- * Club domestic league appearances and goals as of 23 October 2025 ‡ National team caps and goals as of 8 August 2014

Serhiy Podryhulya (Ukrainian: Сергій Васильович Подригуля; born 5 February 1992 in Lutsk, Volyn Oblast, Ukraine) is a Ukrainian football referee and former footballer who played as a midfielder.

Podryhulya began his playing career in sportive school in native town Lutsk, where he joined to FC Volyn Lutsk team. He made his first team debut entering as a second-half substitute against FC Enerhetyk Burshtyn on 16 June 2008.

In 2010, Podryhulya was called up to the Ukraine national under-19 football team for a series of matches in preparation for the 2012 UEFA European Under-19 Championship.
