= Ivan Kohut =

Ukrainian footballer

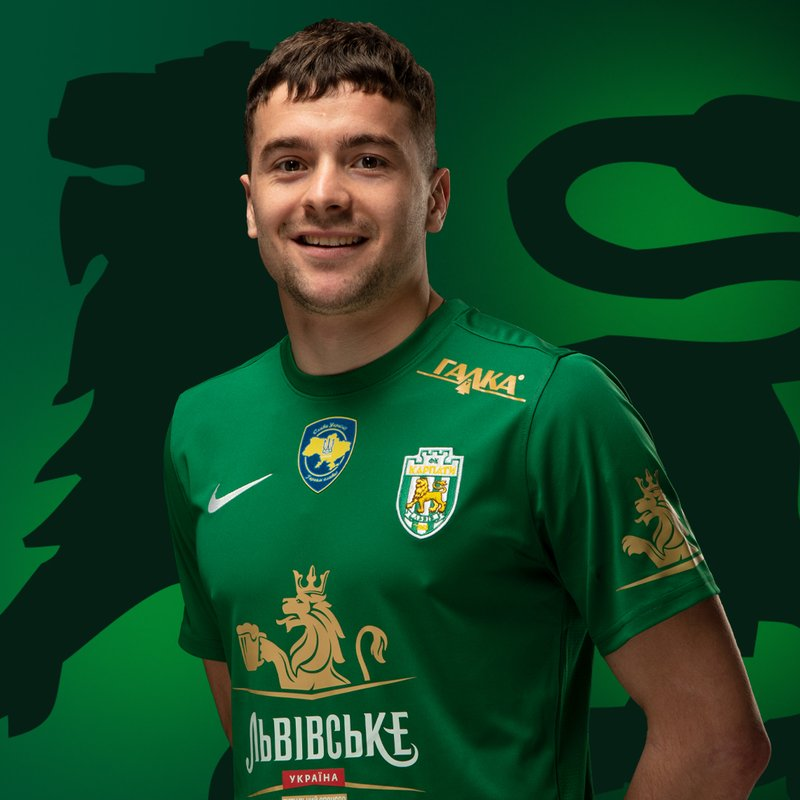

Personal information
- Full name: Ivan Volodymyrovych Kohut
- Date of birth: 31 August 1998 (age 28)
- Place of birth: Zboriv, Ukraine
- Height: 1.72 m (5 ft 8 in)
- Position: Left midfielder

Team information
- Current team: Chornomorets Odesa
- Number: 17

Youth career
- 2013–2014: DYuSSh Zboriv
- 2014–2015: Ternopil
- 2015: Sokil Zolochiv

Senior career*
Years	Team	Apps	(Gls)
2015	Zboriv	0	(0)
2016	Nyva Berezhany	6	(0)
2016–2018	Krystal Chortkiv	50	(11)
2018–2022	Ahrobiznes Volochysk	83	(5)
2022–2023	Karpaty Lviv	21	(1)
2023–2025	Livyi Bereh Kyiv	47	(2)
2025–	Chornomorets Odesa	18	(3)
- * Club domestic league appearances and goals as of 7 June 2026

Ivan Volodymyrovych Kohut (Ukrainian: Іван Володимирович Когут; born 31 August 1998) is a Ukrainian professional footballer who plays as a midfielder for Ukrainian club Chornomorets Odesa.

== Career ==
=== Chornomorets Odesa ===
On 20 June 2025, Ivan Kohut joined Chornomorets Odesa. On 2 August 2025 in the 1st round match of Ukrainian First League between FC Chornomorets and Nyva Ternopil I. Kohut made his official debut as player of Chornomorets. In this match he also scored his first goal as a Chornomorets player. Later, the Control and Disciplinary Committee of the UAF annulled the result of the match and awarded Nyva Ternopil a technical defeat (0–3).

== Honours ==
Chornomorets Odesa

- Ukrainian First League runner-up: 2025–26

== Personal life ==
He is the twin brother of Mykola Kohut who is also a professional footballer.
