= Vladyslav Klymenko =

Ukrainian footballer

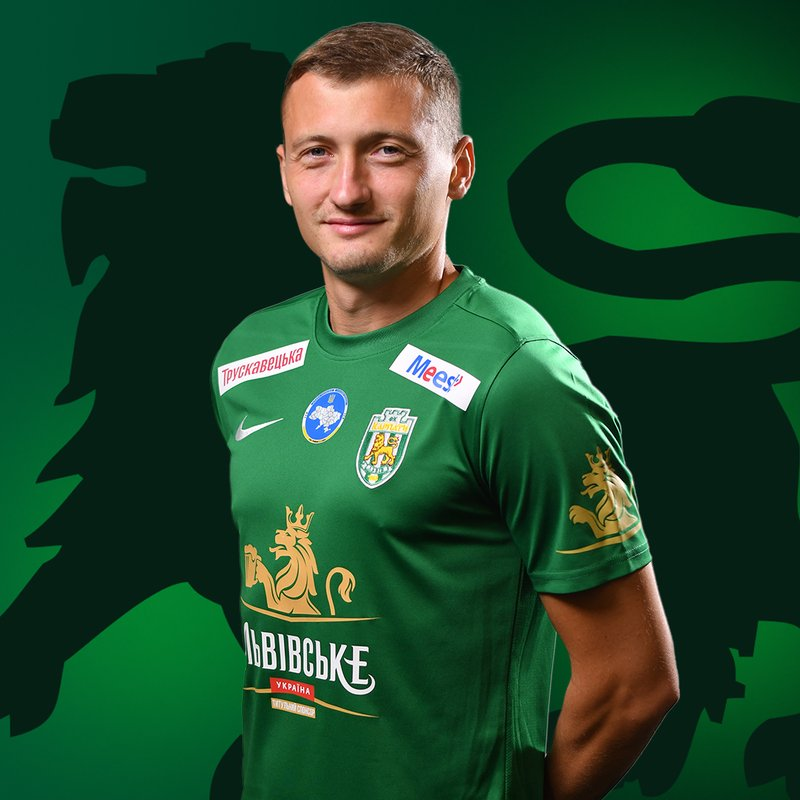

Personal information
- Full name: Vladyslav Serhiyovych Klymenko
- Date of birth: 19 June 1994 (age 32)
- Place of birth: Odesa, Ukraine
- Height: 1.75 m (5 ft 9 in)
- Position: Midfielder

Team information
- Current team: Chornomorets Odesa
- Number: 21

Youth career
- 2007–2011: DYuSSh–11 [Chornomorets] Odesa

Senior career*
Years	Team	Apps	(Gls)
2011–2012	Real Pharma Yuzhne	13	(0)
2012–2013	Kryvbas Kryvyi Rih	0	(0)
2013–2014	Real Pharma Ovidiopol	21	(0)
2014–2016	Skala Stryi	70	(2)
2017–2020	Inhulets Petrove	88	(8)
2020–2021	Chornomorets Odesa	20	(1)
2021–2022	Mariupol	6	(1)
2022–2023	Inhulets Petrove	27	(1)
2023–2025	Karpaty Lviv	44	(1)
2026–	Chornomorets Odesa	13	(1)
- * Club domestic league appearances and goals as of 2 August 2026

Vladyslav Klymenko (Ukrainian: Владислав Сергійович Клименко; born 19 June 1994) is a Ukrainian professional footballer who plays as a midfielder for Ukrainian club Chornomorets Odesa.

== Career ==
He is a product of Odesa sports school DYuSSh–11. Klymenko made his debut at senior level for FC Real Pharma Yuzhne in the Ukrainian Second League in 2011. In 2012 he joined the Ukrainian Premier League club FC Kryvbas Kryvyi Rih, where he played in the youth team in the UPL youth league. Klymenko joined FC Inhulets Petrove during winter of 2016–17 after leaving Skala Stryi.

On 7 January 2021, Klymenko left Inhulets Petrove and joined Chornomorets Odesa. On 6 August 2021, Klymenko left Chornomorets Odesa and joined FC Mariupol.

On 15 January 2026, Klymenko left Karpaty Lviv and for the second time in his career joined Chornomorets Odesa As a player for Chornomorets in the 2025–26 season, he made his official debut against UCSA Tarasivka on 21 March 2026. On 8 April 2026 in the 22nd round match of the 2025–26 Ukrainian First League between Chornomorets and Inhulets Petrove Klymenko scored his first goal as a player of Chornomorets this season.

== Honours ==
Chornomorets Odesa

- Ukrainian First League runner-up: 2025–26
