= Oleksiy Khoblenko =

Ukrainian footballer

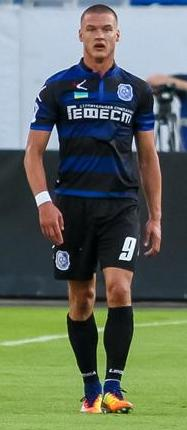

Personal information
- Full name: Oleksiy Serhiyovych Khoblenko
- Date of birth: 4 April 1994 (age 32)
- Place of birth: Yekaterinburg, Russia
- Height: 1.84 m (6 ft 0 in)
- Position: Striker

Team information
- Current team: UCSA Tarasivka
- Number: 9

Youth career
- 2008: Elektron Romny
- 2008–2009: Yunist Chernihiv
- 2009–2011: Dynamo Kyiv

Senior career*
Years	Team	Apps	(Gls)
2011–2016	Dynamo Kyiv	0	(0)
2011–2013	→ Dynamo-2 Kyiv	43	(4)
2013–2014	→ Poltava (loan)	18	(4)
2014–2015	→ Dynamo-2 Kyiv	28	(7)
2015	→ Hoverla Uzhhorod (loan)	12	(0)
2016	→ Chornomorets Odesa (loan)	7	(1)
2016–2018	Chornomorets Odesa	46	(10)
2018	→ Lech Poznań (loan)	11	(2)
2018–2019	Dynamo Brest	37	(13)
2020–2021	Dnipro-1	30	(9)
2021	→ Stabæk (loan)	4	(0)
2021	→ Kryvbas Kryvyi Rih (loan)	19	(11)
2022–2023	Kryvbas Kryvyi Rih	8	(1)
2022	→ Levadia Tallinn (loan)	6	(1)
2023	→ Karpaty Lviv (loan)	7	(1)
2023	→ LNZ Cherkasy (loan)	11	(1)
2024	LNZ Cherkasy	11	(1)
2024–2026	Chornomorets Odesa	43	(9)
2026–	UCSA Tarasivka	10	(3)

International career^{‡}
2009–2010	Ukraine U16	21	(9)
2010–2011	Ukraine U17	15	(2)
2011–2012	Ukraine U18	13	(5)
2012–2013	Ukraine U19	12	(1)
2014	Ukraine U20	3	(0)
2014–2015	Ukraine U21	10	(1)
- * Club domestic league appearances and goals as of 25 October 2026 ‡ National team caps and goals as of 28 December 2019

Oleksiy Serhiyovych Khoblenko (Ukrainian: Олексій Сергійович Хобленко; born 4 April 1994) is a Ukrainian professional footballer who plays as a striker.

== Career ==
Khoblenko is a product of the Elektron Romny, Yunist Chernihiv in Chernihiv and Dynamo youth sportive schools. He started his senior career in the Ukrainian First League club Dynamo-2 Kyiv.

=== Poltava (Loan) ===
In Summer 2013 he moved on loan for FC Poltava in Ukrainian First League, where in the season 2013-14, he played 18 games and scored 4 goals.

=== Dynamo-2 Kyiv ===
In summer 2014 he moved to Dynamo-2 Kyiv in Ukrainian First League, where in the season 2014-15, he played 28 games and he scored 7 goals.

=== Hoverla Uzhhorod (loan) ===
In 2015 he went on loan to Hoverla Uzhhorod.

=== Chornomorets Odesa ===
In 2016 he moved to Chornomorets Odesa then he extended his contract. Here he played until 2018.

=== Lech Poznań (Loan) ===
On 12 January 2018 he was loaned for a half year to Ekstraklasa side Lech Poznań, where he contributed to Europa League first qualifying round, playing 11 matches and scoring 2 goals.

=== Dynamo Brest ===
In summer 2018 he moved to Dynamo Brest, where he won the Belarusian Premier League in 2019 the Belarusian Cup in 2017–18 and two Belarusian Super Cup in 2018 and 2019

=== Dnipro-1 ===
In 2020, he moved to Dnipro-1 and on 12 September 2020 he scored against Olimpik Donetsk in Ukrainian Premier League. On 18 september 2020 he scored against FC Mariupol at Dnipro Arena and on 22 November 2020 he scored against FC Mynai On 1 May 2021 he scored against Shakhtar Donetsk in Ukrainian Premier League in the season 2020-21 at the Olympic Stadium in Kyiv

=== Stabæk (Loan) ===
On 11 May 2021 he went on loan to Stabæk in Eliteserien.

=== Dnipro-1 ===
In summer 2021, he returned to Dnipro-1 in Ukrainian Premier League. Rumors state that, earlier in the press wrote that Khoblenko on lease rights will pass to Kryvbas Kryvyi Rih for which already played the first control match against Oleksandriya scoring also by penalty.

=== Kryvbas Kryvyi Rih ===
On 21 July 2021 he went on loan to Kryvbas Kryvyi Rih (2020) in the Ukrainian First League. On 25 July he made his debut, scoring a goal against Olimpik Donetsk. On 7 August he scored against Hirnyk-Sport Horishni Plavni. On 14 August he scored two goals against Kremin Kremenchuk. He has been voted Player of the Month for August 2021. On 12 September he scored four goals in a match against Uzhhorod. As a result, he was voted Player of Week for round 8 of the Ukrainian First League. On 5 November he scored against Nyva Ternopil. On 21 November he scored two goals against Kremin Kremenchuk. On 11 December, he signed a permanent two-and-a-half-year contract with the club.

==== FCI Levadia (Loan) ====
On 10 March 2022, Khoblenko joined Estonian club FCI Levadia on loan as a result of the 2022 Russian invasion of Ukraine. On 20 April he scored his first goal with the new club against Narva.

==== Karpaty Lviv (Loan) ====
On 27 December 2022 he moved on loan Karpaty Lviv until the end of the season.

=== Chornomorets Odesa ===
In summer 2024 Khoblenko moved to Chornomorets Odesa in Ukrainian Premier League. On 13 September 2025, he scored three goals against Feniks-Mariupol at the Chornomorets Stadium in Odesa. Khoblenko left the team on June 30, 2026.

=== UCSA Tarasivka ===
In summer 2026 he signed for UCSA in Ukrainian First League and on 25 July 2026, he scored his first goal with the new club against Polissya-2 Zhytomyr.

== Career statistics ==
As of 25 October 2026

Appearances and goals by club, season and competition
Club	Season	League			National cup (Note: Includes Ukrainian Cup, Belarusian Cup)		Continental		Other		Total	
Club	Season	Division	Apps	Goals	Apps	Goals	Apps	Goals	Apps	Goals	Apps	Goals
Dynamo-2 Kyiv	2011–12	Ukrainian First League	23	3	—		—		—		23	3
Dynamo-2 Kyiv	2012–13	Ukrainian First League	20	1	—		—		1 (Note: Includes promotion/relegation play-offs)	0	21	1
Dynamo-2 Kyiv	2014–15	Ukrainian First League	28	7	—		—		—		28	7
Dynamo-2 Kyiv	Total		71	11	—		—		1	0	72	11
FC Poltava (loan)	2013–14	Ukrainian First League	18	4	0	0	—		—		18	4
Hoverla Uzhhorod	2015–16	Ukrainian Premier League	12	0	0	0	—		—		12	0
Chornomorets Odesa	2015–16	Ukrainian Premier League	7	1	0	0	—		—		7	1
Chornomorets Odesa	2016–17	Ukrainian Premier League	27	2	0	0	—		—		27	2
Chornomorets Odesa	2017–18	Ukrainian Premier League	19	8	1	0	—		—		20	8
Chornomorets Odesa	Total		53	11	1	0	—		—		54	11
Lech Poznań (loan)	2017–18	Ekstraklasa	11	2	—		—		—		11	2
Dynamo Brest	2018	Belarusian Premier League	12	4	1	0	4 (Note: Appearances in UEFA Europa League)	0	0	0	30	9
Dynamo Brest	2019	Belarusian Premier League	25	9	1	0	0	0	1 (Note: Appearance in Belarusian Super Cup)	0	14	4
Dynamo Brest	Total		37	13	2	0	4	0	1	0	44	13
Dnipro-1	2019–20	Ukrainian Premier League	12	5	0	0	0	0	0	0	12	5
Dnipro-1	2020–21	Ukrainian Premier League	18	4	1	0	0	0	0	0	19	4
Dnipro-1	Total		30	9	1	0	0	0	1	0	31	9
Stabæk (loan)	2021	Eliteserien	4	0	0	0	0	0	0	0	4	0
Kryvbas Kryvyi Rih	2021–22	Ukrainian First League	19	11	1	0	0	0	0	0	20	11
Kryvbas Kryvyi Rih	2022–23	Ukrainian Premier League	8	1	0	0	0	0	0	0	8	1
Kryvbas Kryvyi Rih	Total		27	12	1	0	0	0	0	0	28	12
FCI Levadia (loan)	2022	Meistriliiga	6	1	0	0	0	0	0	0	6	1
Karpaty Lviv (loan)	2022–23	Ukrainian First League	0	0	0	0	0	0	0	0	0	0
LNZ Cherkasy	2023–24	Ukrainian Premier League	22	2	1	0	0	0	0	0	20	11
Chornomorets Odesa	2024–25	Ukrainian Premier League	28	4	0	0	0	0	0	0	28	4
Chornomorets Odesa	2025–26	Ukrainian First League	15	5	1	1	0	0	0	0	16	6
Chornomorets Odesa	Total		43	9	1	1	—		—		44	10
UCSA Tarasivka	2026–27	Ukrainian First League	10	3	0	0	0	0	0	0	10	3
UCSA Tarasivka	Total		10	3	1	0	—		—		11	3
Career total			344	77	8	1	4	0	2	0	358	86

== Honours ==
Dynamo Brest

- Belarusian Premier League: 2019
- Belarusian Cup: 2017–18
- Belarusian Super Cup: 2018, 2019

Chornomorets Odesa

- Ukrainian First League runner-up: 2025–26

Individual

- Ukrainian First League Player of the Month: August 2021
- Ukrainian First League Player of the Month: September 2025
