= Vadym Yushchyshyn =

Ukrainian footballer

Personal information
- Full name: Vadym Yevhenovych Yushchyshyn
- Date of birth: 23 November 1999 (age 26)
- Place of birth: Lviv, Ukraine
- Height: 1.87 m (6 ft 2 in)
- Position: Goalkeeper

Team information
- Current team: UCSA Tarasivka
- Number: 31

Youth career
- 2011–2016: Karpaty Lviv

Senior career*
Years	Team	Apps	(Gls)
2016–2019	Karpaty Lviv	0	(0)
2019–2024	Veres Rivne	7	(0)
2021	→ Uzhhorod (loan)	5	(0)
2025	Vorskla Poltava	0	(0)
2025–2026	Chornomorets Odesa	3	(0)
2026–	UCSA Tarasivka	3	(0)
- * Club domestic league appearances and goals as of 14 August 2026

Vadym Yevhenovych Yushchyshyn (Ukrainian: Вадим Євгенович Ющишин; born 23 November 1999) is a Ukrainian professional footballer who plays as a goalkeeper.

== Career ==
In February 2025 he moved to Vorskla Poltava. In July 2025 Yushchyshyn signed for Chornomorets Odesa. He made his debut for Chornomorets on 23 August 2025 against Zorya Luhansk in the 2025–26 Ukrainian Cup. Yushchyshyn left the team on June 30, 2026.

On 23 July 2026, Yushchyshyn joined UCSA Tarasivka.

== Honours ==
Chornomorets Odesa

- Ukrainian First League runner-up: 2025–26
