= Andriy Khoma =

Ukrainian footballer

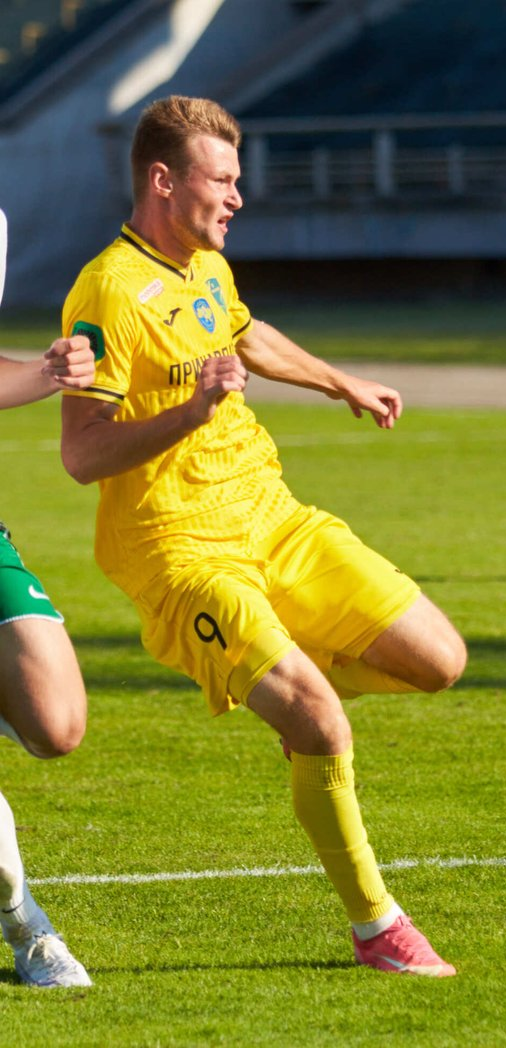
- Khoma with Prykarpattia Ivano-Frankivsk in 2023

Personal information
- Full name: Andriy Volodymyrovych Khoma
- Date of birth: 23 September 2001 (age 25)
- Place of birth: Ivano-Frankivsk, Ukraine
- Height: 1.75 m (5 ft 9 in)
- Position: Centre-forward

Team information
- Current team: Chornomorets Odesa
- Number: 9

Youth career
- 2012–2013: DYuSSh-99 Rohatyn
- 2015–2019: Prykarpattia Ivano-Frankivsk

Senior career*
Years	Team	Apps	(Gls)
2017	Putyatyntsi	4	(4)
2018–2019	Prykarpattia-Teplovyk Ivano-Frankivsk	16	(5)
2019–2025	Prykarpattia Ivano-Frankivsk	110	(36)
2026–	Chornomorets Odesa	19	(5)
- * Club domestic league appearances and goals as of 1 November 2026

Andriy Volodymyrovych Khoma (Ukrainian: Андрій Володимирович Хома; born 23 September 2001) is a Ukrainian professional footballer who plays as a centre-forward for Ukrainian club Chornomorets Odesa.

== Career ==
On 26 January 2026, Andriy Khoma has left Prykarpattia Ivano-Frankivsk and joined Chornomorets Odesa. As a player for Chornomorets, he made his official debut against UCSA Tarasivka on 21 March 2026. On 3 April 2026 in the 21st round match of the 2025–26 Ukrainian First League between Metalurh Zaporizhzhia and Chornomorets Khoma scored his first goal as a player of Chornomorets. On 31 October 2026 in the 11th round match of the 2026–27 Ukrainian Premier League between Veres Rivne and Chornomorets Khoma scored his first goal in the UPL.

== Honours ==
Chornomorets Odesa

- Ukrainian First League runner-up: 2025–26
