= Lymanka =

Rural locality in Odesa Oblast, Ukraine

Lymanka Лиманка
- Village
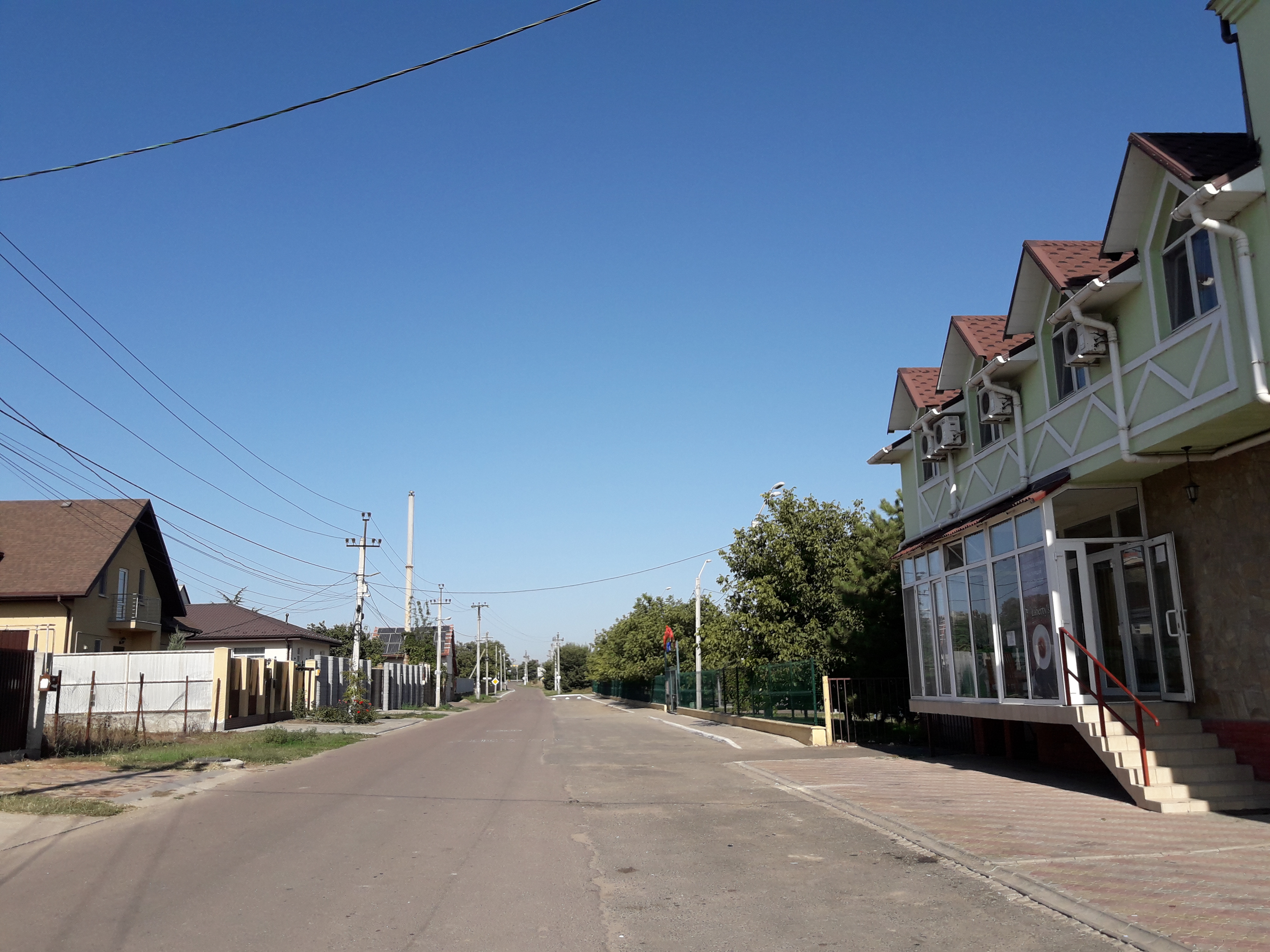
- Interactive map of Lymanka
- Location within Ukraine Location within Odesa Oblast
- Coordinates: 46°23′18″N 30°40′51″E
- Country: Ukraine
- Oblast: Odesa Oblast
- Raion: Odesa Raion
- Hromada: Tairove settlement hromada

Population (2019)
  - Total: 10,590
- Time zone: UTC+2 (EET (Kyiv))
  - Summer (DST): UTC+3 (EEST)

Lymanka (Ukrainian: Лиманка, until 2016 called Mizikevycha Ukrainian: Мізікевича) is a village in Odesa Raion of Odesa Oblast, Ukraine. It belongs to Tairove settlement hromada, one of the hromadas of Ukraine. As of 2019, its population was 10590.

Until 18 July 2020, Lymanka belonged to Ovidiopol Raion. The raion was abolished in July 2020 as part of the administrative reform of Ukraine, which reduced the number of raions of Odesa Oblast to seven. The area of Ovidiopol Raion was split between Odesa and Bilhorod-Dnistrovskyi Raions, with Lymanka being transferred to Odesa Raion.
