= Yevheniy Ryazantsev =

Ukrainian footballer

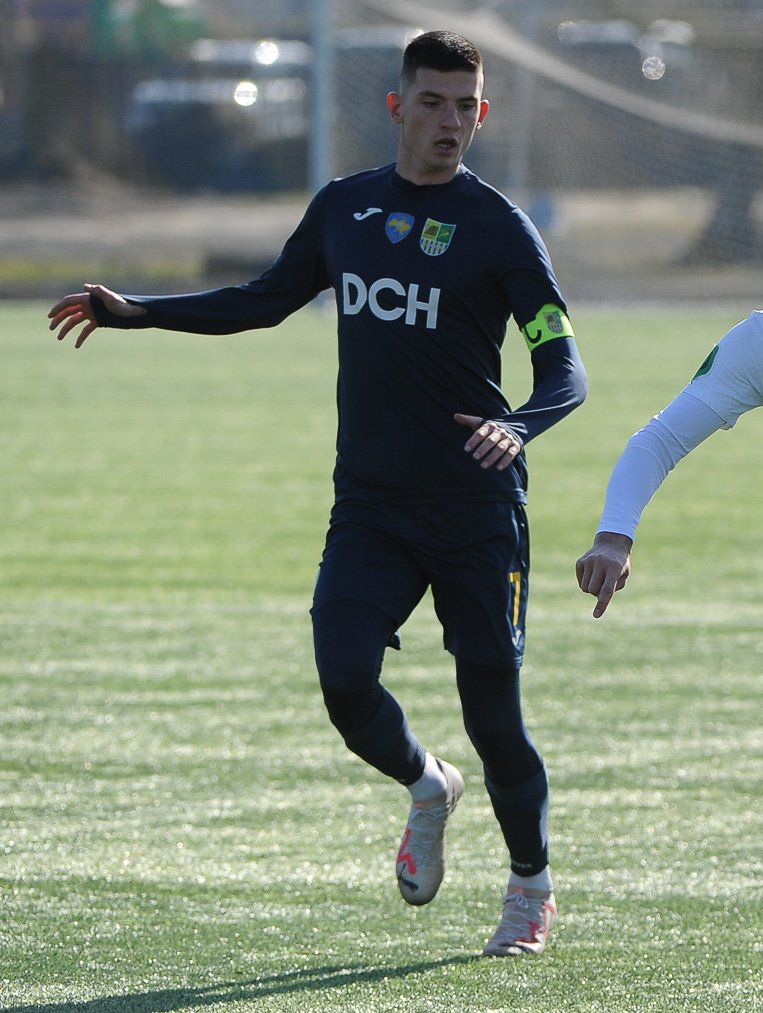

Personal information
- Full name: Yevheniy Ruslanovych Ryazantsev
- Date of birth: 28 January 2002 (age 24)
- Place of birth: Kyiv, Ukraine
- Height: 1.84 m (6 ft 0 in)
- Position: Forward

Team information
- Current team: Podillya Khmelnytskyi (on loan from Chornomorets Odesa)
- Number: 28

Youth career
- 2015–2020: Dynamo Kyiv

Senior career*
Years	Team	Apps	(Gls)
2020	Mayak Valky	3	(2)
2020–2024	Metalist Kharkiv	70	(14)
2024–2025	Mynai	17	(4)
2025–	Chornomorets Odesa	8	(1)
2025	Chornomorets-2 Odesa	6	(0)
2026	→ Podillya Khmelnytskyi (loan)	7	(0)

International career^{‡}
2018–2019	Ukraine U17	6	(1)
- * Club domestic league appearances and goals as of 21 June 2026 ‡ National team caps and goals as of 11 October 2021

Yevheniy Ruslanovych Ryazantsev (Ukrainian: Євгеній Русланович Рязанцев; born 28 January 2002) is a Ukrainian professional footballer who plays as a forward for Ukrainian club Podillya Khmelnytskyi on loan from Chornomorets Odesa.

== Career ==
On 4 September 2024, Ryazantsev joined FC Mynai.

=== Chornomorets Odesa ===
On 14 July 2025, Ryazantsev joined Chornomorets Odesa. On 2 August 2025 in the 1st round match of the Ukrainian First League 2025–26 between FC Chornomorets and Nyva Ternopil he made his official debut as player of Chornomorets. On 10 August 2025 in the 2nd round match of the Ukrainian First League 2025–26 between Podillya Khmelnytskyi and FC Chornomorets he scored his first goal as a player of Chornomorets.

=== Podillya Khmelnytskyi ===
On 4 March 2026, Ryazantsev joined Podillya Khmelnytskyi on loan from Chornomorets Odesa until the end of the 2025–26 season. As a player for Podillya, he made his official debut against Inhulets Petrove on 22 March 2026.
