= Vasyl Kurko =

Ukrainian footballer (born 1995)

Personal information
- Full name: Vasyl Mykolayovych Kurko
- Date of birth: 25 April 1995 (age 31)
- Place of birth: Illichivsk, Ukraine
- Height: 1.90 m (6 ft 3 in)
- Position: Centre-back

Team information
- Current team: Chornomorets Odesa
- Number: 5

Youth career
- 2007–2012: Bastion Illichivsk
- 2012: Metalurh Donetsk

Senior career*
Years	Team	Apps	(Gls)
2012–2015	Chornomorets Odesa	0	(0)
2015–2016	Metalist Kharkiv	0	(0)
2016–2017	Zhemchuzhyna Odesa	53	(4)
2018–2020	Volyn Lutsk	60	(3)
2021	Prykarpattia Ivano-Frankivsk	16	(2)
2021–2022	Livyi Bereh Kyiv	19	(2)
2022–2024	Veres Rivne	53	(0)
2024–2025	Obolon Kyiv	32	(1)
2026–	Chornomorets Odesa	20	(1)
- * Club domestic league appearances and goals as of 31 October 2026

Vasyl Mykolayovych Kurko (Ukrainian: Василь Миколайович Курко; born 25 April 1995) is a Ukrainian professional footballer who plays as a centre-back for Ukrainian club Chornomorets Odesa.

== Career ==
On 15 January 2026, Kurko has left Obolon Kyiv and joined Chornomorets Odesa. As a player for Chornomorets, he made his official debut against UCSA Tarasivka on 21 March 2026. On 31 October 2026 in the 11th round match of the Ukrainian Premier League 2026–27 between Veres Rivne and Chornomorets Vasyl Kurko scored his first club goal.

== Honours ==
Chornomorets Odesa

- Ukrainian First League runner-up: 2025–26
