= 2023–24 FC Mynai season =

Mynai
2023–24 season
- Owner: Valeriy Peresolyak
- Manager: Volodymyr Sharan (until 17 November); Željko Ljubenović (from 18 November)
- Stadium: Mynai Arena
- Ukrainian Premier League: 15th (relegated via mini tournament)
- Ukrainian Cup: Round of 16
- Top goalscorer: League: Artur Remenyak; Denys Ustymenko (5 each); All: Artur Remenyak (6)

The 2023–24 season was Football Club Mynai's 4th consecutive season in the Ukrainian Premier League and 7th season in existence as a football club. In addition to the domestic league, Mynai participated in this season's editions of the Ukrainian Cup.

The club started terminating the contracts of their personnel in the winter break after the abysmal start of the season without winning a match out of 15 in the league. The manager got replaced, and by mutual agreement, six players left the team, followed by another three players.

== Squad ==
Squad at end of season

Note: Flags indicate national team as defined under FIFA eligibility rules; some limited exceptions apply. Players may hold more than one non-FIFA nationality.

No.	Pos.	Nation	Player
1	GK	UKR	Maksym Rosul
2	DF	UKR	Taras Dmytruk
3	DF	UKR	Kyrylo Prokopchuk
4	DF	UKR	Bohdan Chuyev
5	DF	UKR	Sergiy Korniychuk
6	MF	UKR	Vasyl Vashkeba
7	FW	UKR	Yehor Hunichev (on loan from Oleksandriya)
8	MF	UKR	Ivan Matyushenko
9	FW	UKR	Denys Ustymenko (on loan from Kryvbas Kryvyi Rih)
10	MF	UKR	Pavlo Tyshchuk
11	FW	UKR	Ivan Demydenko
13	GK	UKR	Oleksandr Bandura

No.	Pos.	Nation	Player
17	MF	UKR	Nazariy Vorobchak
19	FW	UKR	Kiril Popov (on loan from Kolos Kovalivka)
22	DF	UKR	Yevheniy Skyba
23	DF	UKR	Dmytro Nyemchaninov
29	DF	UKR	Artur Remenyak
32	MF	UKR	Serhiy Petko
35	GK	UKR	Oleksandr Kemkin
44	MF	UKR	Vadym Vitenchuk
71	MF	UKR	Vladyslav Semotyuk (on loan from Kryvbas Kryvyi Rih)
77	DF	UKR	Yaroslav Kysil
97	MF	UKR	Tymur Korablin
99	FW	UKR	Vladyslav Vakula

== Competitions ==
=== Overview ===
Competition	First match	Last match	Starting round	Final position	Record							
Competition	First match	Last match	Starting round	Final position	Pld	W	D	L	GF	GA	GD	Win %
Ukrainian Premier League	30 July 2023	25 May 2024	Matchday 1	15th	30	5	10	15	27	50	−23	16.67
Ukrainian Premier League mini tournament	26 July 2024	30 July 2024	Semi-finals	Runners-up	2	0	1	1	3	6	−3	0.00
Ukrainian Cup	23 September 2023	23 September 2023	Round of 16	Round of 16	1	0	0	1	0	1	−1	0.00
Total					33	5	11	17	30	57	−27	15.15

Source: Competitions

=== Ukrainian Premier League ===
==== League table ====
Pos	Team	Pld	W	D	L	GF	GA	GD	Pts	Qualification or relegation
12	Chornomorets Odesa	30	10	2	18	38	47	−9	32 (Note: Zorya Luhansk finished ahead of Kolos Kovalivka and Chornomorets Odesa on head-to-head points: Zorya Luhansk 7, Kolos Kovalivka 6, Chornomorets Odesa 4)	
13	Veres Rivne (O)	30	6	10	14	31	46	−15	28	Qualification for the Relegation play-off
14	Obolon Kyiv (O)	30	5	11	14	18	41	−23	26	Qualification for the Relegation play-off
15	Mynai (R)	30	5	10	15	27	50	−23	25	Qualification for the mini tournament
16	Metalist 1925 Kharkiv (R)	30	5	8	17	32	57	−25	23	Qualification for the mini tournament

Source: upl.ua
Rules for classification: 1) Points; 2) Head-to-head points; 3) Head-to-head goal difference; 4) Head-to-head goals scored; 5) Goal difference; 6) Goals scored; 7) Draw or "Golden match" if two teams tied for title (Article 22, paragraph 3).
(O) Play-off winners; (R) Relegated

==== Results summary ====
Overall								Home						Away					
Pld	W	D	L	GF	GA	GD	Pts	W	D	L	GF	GA	GD	W	D	L	GF	GA	GD
30	5	10	15	27	50	−23	25	3	6	6	16	22	−6	2	4	9	11	28	−17

Source: Worldfootball

==== Results by round ====
Round	1	2	3	4	5	6	7	8	9	10	11	12	13	14	15	16	17	18	19	20	21	22	23	24	25	26	27	28	29	30
Ground	A	H	H	A	H	H	A	A	H	A	A	H	H	A	H	H	A	A	H	A	A	H	H	A	H	H	A	A	H	A
Result	L	L	D	L	D	L	D	L	L	D	L	D	D	L	L	L	W	D	W	L	L	D	L	D	D	W	L	W	W	L
Position	16	16	14	16	15	16	16	16	16	16	16	16	16	16	16	16	16	16	15	16	16	16	16	16	16	15	16	15	15	15
Points	0	0	1	1	2	2	3	3	3	4	4	5	6	6	6	6	9	10	13	13	13	14	14	15	16	19	19	22	25	25

Source: Worldfootball
A = Away; H = Home; W = Win; D = Draw; L = Loss

==== Matches ====
30 July 2023 1	Dynamo Kyiv	4–1	Mynai	Kyiv
17:00 EEST (UTC+3)	Vanat 27', 30'; Popov (red card) 32'; Buyalskyi 87' (pen.); Brazhko (yellow card) 90'; Karavayev 90+3'	Report	Vitenchuk 3', (yellow card) 45+1'; Panasenko (yellow card) 46'; Kravchuk (yellow card) 54'; Bandura (red card) 56'	Stadium: Valeriy Lobanovskyi Dynamo Stadium; Referee: Maksim Kozyryatskiy

5 August 2023 2	Mynai	0–3	LNZ Cherkasy	Mynai
15:00 CET (UTC+1)	Buleza (yellow card) 52'	Report	Muravskyi (yellow card) 16'; Boyko 45'; Pryadun (yellow card) 48', (goal) 53'; Naumets 78'; Penkov (yellow card) 82'	Stadium: Mynai Arena; Referee: Roman Blavatskiy

13 August 2023 3	Mynai	1–1	Dnipro-1	Mynai
13:00 EEST (UTC+3)	Panasenko (yellow card) 43'; Petko (yellow card) 65'; Tverdokhlib 89'	Report	Adamyuk (yellow card) 29'; Sarapiy (red card) 50'; Babenko (yellow card) 59', (penalty missed) 83'; Blanco 90+3' (pen.)	Stadium: Mynai Arena; Referee: Viktor Kopiyevskyy

19 August 2023 4	Metalist 1925 Kharkiv	1–0	Mynai	Zolochivsk rural hromada
17:00 CEST (UTC+2)	Tkachuk (yellow card) 64'; Dmytrenko 71'; Zhychykov (yellow card) 74'	Report	Vyshnevskyi (yellow card) 75'	Stadium: Livyi Bereh Stadium; Referee: Klym Zabroda

27 August 2023 5	Mynai	1–1	Zorya Luhansk	Mynai
13:00 EEST (UTC+3)	Vitenchuk 24' (pen.); Vyshnevskyi (yellow card) 76'	Report	Voloshyn 16'; Snurnitsyn (yellow card) 39'	Stadium: Mynai Arena; Referee: Oleksandr Afanasiev

2 September 2023 6	Mynai	1–4	Shakhtar Donetsk	Mynai
13:00 EEST (UTC+3)	Odaryuk (yellow card) 50'; Ralyuchenko (yellow card) 67'; Hunichev 72'	Report	Matviyenko 36'; Kashchuk 60'; Sudakov (yellow card) 65', (goal) 66'; Kelsy (yellow card) 74'; Vyunnyk 78'; Castillo (yellow card) 85'	Stadium: Mynai Arena; Referee: Dmytro Bondarenko

16 September 2023 7	Oleksandriya	1–1	Mynai	Oleksandriia
19:00 EEST (UTC+3)	Hernández (yellow card) 8'; Kulakovskyi (yellow card) 54', (goal) 73' (pen.); Mykytyshyn (yellow card) 57'	Report	Melnyk (yellow card) 14'; Dmytruk (yellow card) 29'; Ralyuchenko (yellow card) 34'; Hunichev 60'; Vitenchuk (yellow card) 88'	Stadium: CSC Nika; Referee: Oleksandr Shandor

23 September 2023 8	Polissya Zhytomyr	2–1	Mynai	Zhytomyr
15:00 EEST (UTC+3)	Hrytsuk (penalty missed) 45'; Smolyakov 68'; Ohirya (yellow card) 71'; Mustafayev (yellow card) 81', (goal) 83'	Report	Tverdokhlib 39', (yellow card) 44'; Rohozynskyi (yellow card) 45+1'; Korablin (yellow card) 65'; Vitenchuk (yellow card) 76'	Stadium: Tsentralnyi Stadion; Referee: Dmytro Evtukhov

1 October 2023 9	Mynai	0–1	Obolon Kyiv	Mynai
13:00 EEST (UTC+3)	Kravchuk (yellow card) 71'; Holub (yellow card) 76'; Rohozynskyi (yellow card) 87'	Report	Lukyanchuk (yellow card) 53'; Taranukha 78', (yellow card) 90+1'	Stadium: Mynai Arena; Referee: Oleksandr Afanasiev

8 October 2023 10	Rukh Lviv	0–0	Mynai	Lviv
15:00 EEST (UTC+3)	Teslyuk (yellow card) 31'	Report	Rohozynskyi (yellow card) 23'; Dmytruk (yellow card) 79'; Korablin (yellow card) 90+1'	Stadium: Arena Lviv; Referee: Oleksandr Solovyan

21 October 2023 11	Chornomorets Odesa	3–0	Mynai	Odesa
15:00 EEST (UTC+3)	Shtohrin 19', 68'; Kuzyk 81'	Report	Ralyuchenko (yellow card) 48'; Ghecev (yellow card) 72'	Stadium: Chornomorets Stadium; Referee: Vladimir Novokhatniy

29 October 2023 12	Mynai	0–0	Veres Rivne	Mynai
13:00 EET (UTC+2)	Soldat (yellow card) 22'; Vitenchuk (yellow card) 41'; Tverdokhlib (yellow card) 66'	Report	Shevchenko (yellow card) 18'; Sharay (yellow card) 27' (yellow-red card) 90+1'; Siqueira (yellow card) 80'; Balan (yellow card) 88'	Stadium: Mynai Arena; Referee: Yury Ivanov

5 November 2023 13	Mynai	0–0	Vorskla Poltava	Mynai
13:00 EET (UTC+2)	Odaryuk (yellow card) 34'; Panasenko (yellow card) 80'; Nyemchaninov (yellow card) 90'; Ghecev (yellow card) 90+5'	Report	Chelyadin (yellow card) 13'; Sklyar (red card) 89'; Stepanyuk (penalty missed) 90+1'; Khrypchuk (yellow card) 90+5'; Isenko (yellow card) 90+6'	Stadium: Mynai Arena; Referee: Serhiy Zadyran

10 November 2023 14	Kolos Kovalivka	2–0	Mynai	Kovalivka
17:00 EET (UTC+2)	Milko 18'; Burda 35'; Demchenko (yellow card) 80'	Report	Petko (yellow card) 27'; Melnyk (yellow card) 32' (yellow-red card) 49'; Korablin (yellow card) 72'; Soldat (yellow card) 76'	Stadium: Kolos Stadium; Referee: Roman Blavatskiy

25 November 2023 15	Mynai	0–1	Kryvbas Kryvyi Rih	Mynai
13:00 EET (UTC+2)	Dmytruk (yellow card) 6'; Nyemchaninov (yellow card) 55'; Petko (yellow card) 64'	Report	Bliznichenko 64'; Vakulko (yellow card) 81' (yellow-red card) 86'	Stadium: Mynai Arena; Referee: Alexander Omelchenko

24 February 2024 18	Dnipro-1	1–1	Mynai	Dnipro
13:00 EET (UTC+2)	Babenko (yellow card) 39'; Pikhalyonok 51' (pen.)	Report	Remenyak 26'; Korablin (penalty missed) 40', (yellow card) 70'	Stadium: Dnipro-Arena; Referee: Oleksandr Kalonov

2 March 2024 19	Mynai	2–0	Metalist 1925 Kharkiv	Mynai
13:00 EET (UTC+2)	Korniychuk 31'; Petko (yellow card) 56'; Skyba 90+1'	Report	Chervak (yellow card) 5'; Imerekov (yellow card) 52'; Rusyn (yellow card) 56' (yellow-red card) 59'; Habelok (yellow card) 88'	Stadium: Mynai Arena; Attendance: 332; Referee: Roman Blavatskyi

7 March 2024 20	Zorya Luhansk	2–0	Mynai	Zolochivsk rural hromada
15:30 EET (UTC+2)	Antyukh 18'; Buhay 73'	Report	Vitenchuk (yellow card) 14'; Semotyuk (yellow card) 51'; Korniychuk (yellow card) 84'	Stadium: Arena Livyi Bereh; Referee: Dmytro Bondarenko

12 March 2024 21	Shakhtar Donetsk	2–0	Mynai	Lviv
18:00 EET (UTC+2)	Sudakov 24' (pen.); Sikan 30'	Report	Korniychuk (yellow card) 23'; Korablin (yellow card) 75'; Ustymenko (yellow card) 88'	Stadium: Arena Lviv; Attendance: 410; Referee: Volodymyr Novohatnii

23 March 2024 17	LNZ Cherkasy	1–2	Mynai	Cherkasy
15:30 EET (UTC+2)	Rybalka (yellow card) 27'; Norenkov (yellow card) 74'; Kovalyov (yellow card) 89'; Bar 90+3'	Report	Korablin 33'; Ustymenko 60'	Stadium: Cherkasy Arena; Attendance: 400; Referee: Dmytro Kubriak
Note: The match was postponed to a later date due to problems with LNZ Cherkasy's home venue.

31 March 2024 22	Mynai	2–2	Oleksandriya	Mynai
13:00 EEST (UTC+3)	Vitenchuk (yellow card) 30'; Vakula (yellow card) 42'; Petko (yellow card) 49'; Ustymenko 63'; Hunichev 75', (yellow card) 90+5'; Remenyak (yellow card) 90+3'	Report	Loginov (yellow card) 12'; Campos (yellow card) 19'; Kulakov (yellow card) 45+2', (goal) 50'; Kalitvintsev 58'; Kovalets (penalty missed) 68', (yellow card) 71' (yellow-red card) 79'	Stadium: Mynai Arena; Attendance: 680; Referee: Dmytro Kryvushkin

8 April 2024 23	Mynai	2–3	Polissya Zhytomyr	Mynai
13:00 EEST (UTC+3)	Hunichev (yellow card) 13'; Ustymenko 65', 87'; Semotyuk (yellow card) 90+6'	Report	Hernández 9', 23'; Mustafayev 59'; Petryak (yellow card) 76'; Tankovskyi (yellow card) 86'	Stadium: Mynai Arena; Attendance: 709; Referee: Ihor Paskhal

13 April 2024 24	Obolon Kyiv	1–1	Mynai	Kyiv
13:00 EEST (UTC+3)	O. Rybka (red card) 12'; Hrysyo (yellow card) 31'; Chernenko (yellow card) 45'; Osman (yellow card) 55'; Pryimak 63'	Report	Petko (yellow card) 38'; Korablin (yellow card) 45+3'; Ustymenko 58' (pen.); Korniychuk (yellow card) 60' (yellow-red card) 67'; Dmytruk (yellow card) 90+4'	Stadium: Obolon Arena; Attendance: 1,012; Referee: Maksim Kozyryatskiy

17 April 2024 16	Mynai	1–3	Dynamo Kyiv	Mynai
15:30 EEST (UTC+3)	Korablin 48'; Dmytruk (yellow card) 60'; Kysil (yellow card) 90+1'	Report	Buyalskyi 5'; Nyemchaninov 29' (o.g.); Yarmolenko (yellow card) 56'; Vanat (yellow card) 75'; Voloshyn 86'	Stadium: Mynai Arena; Attendance: 475; Referee: Oleksandr Shandor
Note: The match was postponed to a later date due to the prolonged air alert in Ukraine which started at the beginning of the game.

22 April 2024 25	Mynai	1–1	Rukh Lviv	Mynai
13:00 EEST (UTC+3)	Kysil (yellow card) 40'; Petko 68', (yellow card) 90'	Report	Fedor (yellow card) 55'; Plumain (yellow card) 64'; Kvasnytsya 77'	Stadium: Mynai Arena; Attendance: 250; Referee: Dmytro Yevtukhov

27 April 2024 26	Mynai	2–0	Chornomorets Odesa	Mynai
13:00 EEST (UTC+3)	Korablin 6'; Dmytruk (yellow card) 45'; Skyba (yellow card) 51'; Remenyak 62'	Report	Badibanga (yellow card) 37'; Braharu (yellow card) 90+3'	Stadium: Mynai Arena; Attendance: 520; Referee: Denys Reznikov

6 May 2024 27	Veres Rivne	3–1	Mynai	Rivne
18:00 EEST (UTC+3)	Dakhnovskyi (yellow card) 28', (goal) 62'; Siqueira 30'; Shastal (penalty missed) 86', 86'	Report	Remenyak 5'; Skyba (yellow card) 73'	Stadium: Avanhard Stadium; Attendance: 1,910; Referee: Ihor Paskhal

11 May 2024 28	Vorskla Poltava	2–3	Mynai	Poltava
13:00 EEST (UTC+3)	Stepanyuk (yellow card) 28'; Pavlyuk 36'; Hlushchenko 55', (yellow card) 81'; Chelyadin (yellow card) 64'; Felipe (yellow card) 85', (penalty missed) 90+2'	Report	Petko (yellow card) 3'; Skyba (yellow card) 35'; Remenyak 74'; Pavlyuk 80' (o.g.); Vakula (yellow card) 90+2'; Vitenchuk 90+5' (pen.)	Stadium: Butovsky Vorskla Stadium; Attendance: 570; Referee: Nazarii Dord

19 May 2024 29	Mynai	3–2	Kolos Kovalivka	Mynai
15:30 EEST (UTC+3)	Remenyak 36', (yellow card) 69'; Ustymenko (yellow card) 47'; Semotyuk (yellow card) 56'; Korablin 67'; Vakula 81'; Kemkin (yellow card) 90+4'	Report	Ilyin 2', (yellow card) 49'; Tsurikov 58'; Topalov (yellow card) 71'	Stadium: Mynai Arena; Attendance: 650; Referee: Viktor Kopievskii

25 May 2024 30	Kryvbas Kryvyi Rih	3–0	Mynai	Kryvyi Rih
15:30 EEST (UTC+3)	Ponyedyelnik 38', (yellow card) 77'; Kuzyk 42'; Tverdokhlib (yellow card) 54'; Kozhushko 65'	Report	Ustymenko (yellow card) 51'	Stadium: Hirnyk Stadium; Attendance: 600; Referee: Roman Blavatskyi

==== Mini tournament ====
26 July 2024 Semi-finals	Epitsentr Kamianets-Podilskyi	3–3 (a.e.t.) (3–5 p)	Mynai	Rivne
18:00 EEST (UTC+3)	Myronyuk 12', (red card) 85'; Bezhenar (yellow card) 25'; Bendera 66'; Krystin (yellow card) 70'; Kravchuk 77'	Report	Vakula 19'; Dvorovenko (yellow card) 52'; Prikhna 57'; Remenyak 87'	Stadium: Avanhard Stadium; Attendance: 310; Referee: Andrii Kovalenko
	Penalties
	Zaporozhets (penalty scored); Ravlyk (penalty missed); Kravchuk (penalty scored); Klymets (penalty scored)		Demydenko (penalty scored); Remenyak (penalty scored); Dmytruk (penalty scored); Korablin (penalty scored); Kysil (penalty scored)
Note: Mynai won 5–3 on penalties.

30 July 2024 Final	Livyi Bereh Kyiv	3–0	Mynai	Rivne
18:00 EEST (UTC+3)	Sukhoruchko 20'; Synytsya 29'; M. Kohut 65', (yellow card) 69'; Spivakov (yellow card) 89' (yellow-red card) 90+2'	Report	Hunichev (yellow card) 44'; Matyushenko (yellow card) 50'; Skyba (yellow card) 58'; Kysil (yellow card) 77'	Stadium: Avanhard Stadium; Attendance: 300; Referee: Oleksandr Shandor

=== Ukrainian Cup ===
23 September 2023 Round of 16	Viktoriya Sumy	1–0	Mynai	Sumy
14:00 EEST (UTC+3)	Sasovskyi 47', (yellow card) 56'; Nelin (yellow card) 79'; Shpyryonok (yellow card) 81'	Report	Remenyak (yellow card) 74'; Panasenko (yellow card) 87'	Stadium: Yuvileiny Stadium; Referee: Krystina Kozorog

== Statistics ==
=== Overall ===
Appearances (Apps) numbers are for appearances in competitive games only, including sub appearances.

No.	Player	Pos.	Ukrainian Premier League				Mini tournament				Ukrainian Cup				Total			
No.	Player	Pos.	Apps	Goal	Yellow card	Red card	Apps	Goal	Yellow card	Red card	Apps	Goal	Yellow card	Red card	Apps	Goal	Yellow card	Red card
1	(Ukraine) Maksym Rosul	GK	1												1			
2	(Ukraine) Taras Dmytruk	DF	26		6		2								28		6	
3	(Ukraine) Kyrylo Prokopchuk	DF	9				2								11			
3	(Ukraine) Ihor Soldat	DF	13		2						1				14		2	
4	(Ukraine) Bohdan Chuyev	DF	19				2								21			
4	(Ukraine) Yuriy Mykhayliv	MF									1				1			
5	(Ukraine) Sergiy Korniychuk	DF	11	1	4	1									11	1	4	1
5	(Ukraine) Yuriy Kravchuk	DF	9		3										9		3	
5	(Ukraine) Dmytro Prikhna	DF					1	1							1	1		
6	(Ukraine) Andriy Ralyuchenko	MF	12		3										12		3	
6	(Ukraine) Vasyl Vashkeba	MF	1												1			
7	(Moldova) Mihail Ghecev	MF	12		1						1				13		1	
7	(Ukraine) Yehor Hunichev	FW	22	3	2		2		1						24	3	3	
8	(Ukraine) Andriy Buleza	DF	11		1										11		1	
8	(Ukraine) Ivan Matyushenko	MF	6				2		1						8		1	
9	(Ukraine) Danylo Kolesnyk	FW	1												1			
9	(Ukraine) Denys Ustymenko	FW	15	5	3										15	5	3	
10	(Ukraine) Volodymyr Odaryuk	FW	15		2										15		2	
10	(Ukraine) Pavlo Tyshchuk	MF	2				1								3			
11	(Ukraine) Ivan Demydenko	FW	6				2				1				9			
13	(Ukraine) Oleksandr Bandura	GK	15			1	2								17			1
16	(Ukraine) Yehor Shalfyeyev	MF					2								2			
17	(Ukraine) Nazariy Vorobchak	MF	3				2								5			
19	(Ukraine) Kiril Popov	FW	6												6			
20	(Ukraine) Danylo Holub	FW	4		1						1				5		1	
21	(Ukraine) Vladyslav Dvorovenko	MF					2		1						2		1	
21	(Ukraine) Serhiy Panasenko	MF	8		3						1		1		9		4	
22	(Ukraine) Vitaliy Mykhayliv	FW									1				1			
22	(Ukraine) Yevhenii Skyba	DF	14	1	3		2		1						16	1	4	
22	(Ukraine) Yehor Tverdokhlib	MF	15	2	2										15	2	2	
23	(Ukraine) Nikita Lednev	DF									1				1			
23	(Ukraine) Dmytro Nyemchaninov	DF	23		2										23		2	
29	(Ukraine) Artur Remenyak	FW	19	5	2		2	1			1		1		22	6	3	
32	(Ukraine) Bogdan Bidzinskyi	MF									1				1			
32	(Ukraine) Serhiy Petko	MF	19	1	8										19	1	8	
34	(Ukraine) Illya Olkhovyi	GK	2												2			
35	(Ukraine) Oleksandr Kemkin	GK	14		1						1				15		1	
44	(Ukraine) Vladyslav Klymak	DF									1				1			
44	(Ukraine) Vadym Vitenchuk	MF	29	3	6										29	3	6	
47	(Ukraine) Dmytro Piddubnyi	DF	6												6			
71	(Ukraine) Vladyslav Semotyuk	FW	15		3										15		3	
73	(Ukraine) Oleksandr Melnyk	DF	8		4	1									8		4	1
77	(Ukraine) Yaroslav Kysil	DF	11		2		2		1						13		3	
77	(Ukraine) Oleh Vyshnevskyi	FW	12		2						1				13		2	
78	(Ukraine) Mykola Kyrychok	DF									1				1			
78	(Ukraine) Valeriy Rohozynskyi	MF	13		3										13		3	
97	(Ukraine) Tymur Korablin	MF	23	4	6		2								25	4	6	
99	(Ukraine) Vladyslav Vakula	FW	15	1	1		2	1							17	2	1	
Own goals				1												1		
Totals				27	76	3		3	5				2			30	83	3

=== Clean sheets ===
			Clean sheets			
No.	Player	Games Played	Ukrainian Premier League	Mini tournament	Ukrainian Cup	Total
13	(Ukraine) Oleksandr Bandura	17	3			3
35	(Ukraine) Oleksandr Kemkin	15	1			1
34	(Ukraine) Illya Olkhovyi	2				
1	(Ukraine) Maksym Rosul	1				
Totals			4			4
