= List of Ukrainian football transfers winter 2025–26 =

This is a list of Ukrainian football transfers winter 2025–26

== Ukrainian Premier League ==
=== Dynamo Kyiv ===
In:

No.	Pos.	Nation	Player
—	MF	MLI	Savan Ousmane (from (Mali) AS Real Bamako)
—	MF	UKR	Kirill Pashko (loan return from (Poland) Lechia Gdańsk)
—	FW	VEN	Eric Ramírez (loan return from (Czech Republic) Bohemians 1905)

Out:

No.	Pos.	Nation	Player
—	MF	UKR	Vasyl Burtnyk (Loan return to Nyva Ternopil)
—	MF	UKR	Valentyn Rubchynskyi (Loan to Karpaty Lviv)
—	MF	SEN	Samba Diallo (Loan to Rukh Lviv)
—	MF	MKD	Reshat Ramadani (Loan to (North Macedonia) Shkëndija)
—	MF	UKR	Oleksandr Syrota (Loan to (Turkey) Amed)
—	MF	UKR	Fedir Zadorozhnyi (To Zorya Luhansk)
—	MF	BRA	Vitinho (To (Brazil) Club Athletico Paranaense)
—	FW	UKR	Andriy Matkevych (Loan to Epitsentr)
—	FW	COL	Ángel Torres (To (Turkey) Eyüpspor)
—	FW	VEN	Eric Ramírez (loan to (Venezuela) Carabobo)

=== Epitsentr ===
In:

No.	Pos.	Nation	Player
—	GK	UKR	Nikita Fedotov (Free Agent)
—	DF	ESP	Alagy Oliveira (Loan from (Spain) Torrent)
—	MF	ESP	Carlos Rojas (Loan from (Spain) Hércules)
—	MF	UKR	Kyrylo Kovalets (Free Agent)
—	MF	UKR	Valeriy Luchkevych (Free Agent)
—	FW	UKR	Andriy Matkevych (Loan from Dynamo Kyiv)

Out:

No.	Pos.	Nation	Player
—	GK	UKR	Hlib Bushnyak (Released)
—	DF	UKR	Hlib Savchuk (Released)
—	MF	UKR	Zakhar Khamelyuk (Released)
—	MF	UKR	Andriy Lyashenko (Released)
—	MF	BRA	Geovane (Loan to (Brazil) Clube de Regatas Brasil)
—	FW	UKR	Vladyslav Halushka (Released)
—	FW	UKR	Denis Yanakov (To (Romania) Unirea Slobozia)

=== Karpaty Lviv ===
In:

No.	Pos.	Nation	Player
—	GK	UKR	Nazar Domchak (Free Agent)
—	DF	UKR	Vitaliy Kholod (From Rukh Lviv)
—	DF	UKR	Rostyslav Lyakh (From Rukh Lviv)
—	DF	BRA	Eriki (From (Armenia) Van)
—	MF	UKR	Valentyn Rubchynskyi (Loan from Dynamo Kyiv)
—	MF	UKR	Marko Sapuha (From Rukh Lviv)
—	MF	UKR	Illya Kvasnytsya (From Rukh Lviv)
—	MF	BRA	Edson Fernando (From Rukh Lviv)
—	MF	BRA	Stênio (Loan return from (Brazil) América Mineiro)
—	MF	ESP	Xeber Alkain (From (Spain) Eibar)
—	FW	GAM	Baboucarr Faal (From Rukh Lviv)

Out:

No.	Pos.	Nation	Player
—	DF	ECU	Diego Palacios (Loan return to (Brazil) Corinthians)
—	MF	UKR	Pavlo Polehenko (Released)
—	MF	UKR	Vladyslav Klymenko (Released)
—	MF	UKR	Oleh Fedor (To Polissya Zhytomyr)
—	MF	ESP	Pablo Álvarez (To (Kazakhstan) Aktobe)
—	MF	ARG	Patricio Tanda (Loan return to (Argentina) Racing Club)
—	MF	UKR	Mykola Kyrychok (Loan to Rukh Lviv)
—	FW	BRA	Igor Neves (Loan to Rukh Lviv)
—	FW	UKR	Ihor Krasnopir (To Polissya Zhytomyr)
—	FW	UKR	Fabiano (Loan to (Brazil) Palmeiras)

=== Kolos Kovalivka ===
In:

No.	Pos.	Nation	Player
—	GK	UKR	Artem Nedozymovanyi (from Shakhtar Donetsk U19)
—	MF	UKR	Oleh Kryvoruchko (Loan return from Livyi Bereh Kyiv)
—	MF	UKR	Oleh Ilyin (Loam return from Obolon Kyiv)
—	MF	UKR	Daniil Khrypchuk (From Vorskla Poltava)
—	MF	KOS	Ardit Tahiri (From (Kosovo) Llapi)
—	MF	UKR	Taras Stepanenko (From (Turkey) Eyüpspor)
—	MF	MKD	Luka Stankovski (From (Serbia) Radnički 1923)

Out:

No.	Pos.	Nation	Player
—	MF	KOS	Albin Krasniqi (Loan to (Kosovo) Prishtina)
—	MF	UKR	Oleh Ilyin (Released)
—	MF	UKR	Maksym Tretyakov (Released)
—	MF	UKR	Vladyslav Shershen (Loan to Podillya Khmelnytskyi)
—	MF	UKR	Oleksiy Bezruchuk (Loan to Podillya Khmelnytskyi)
—	FW	NGA	Mathias Oyewusi (To (Morocco) Raja)

=== Kryvbas Kryvyi Rih ===
In:

No.	Pos.	Nation	Player
—	DF	PAN	Joseph Jones (From (Panama) Plaza Amador)
—	MF	ISR	Sami Adam (From (Israel) Hapoel Tel Aviv)
—	MF	VEN	Gleiker Mendoza (From (Venezuela) Angostura)
—	MF	PAN	Giovany Herbert (From (Panama) Athletico Paranaense)
—	FW	SEN	Assan Seck (From (Finland) KTP)

Out:

No.	Pos.	Nation	Player
—	DF	MLI	Bakary Konaté (To (Israel) Maccabi Netanya)
—	MF	VEN	Gleiker Mendoza (Released)
—	MF	UKR	Artur Mykytyshyn (To LNZ Cherkasy)
—	MF	BRA	Guilherme Bahia (To Veres Rivne)
—	MF	BOL	José Flores (Loan return to (Bolivia) The Strongest)
—	FW	FRA	Noha Ndombasi (Released)
—	FW	NGA	Oche Ochowechi (To (Greece) Chania)
—	FW	UKR	Yehor Tverdokhlib (To LNZ Cherkasy)

=== Kudrivka ===
In:

No.	Pos.	Nation	Player
—	GK	UKR	Illya Karavashchenko (Loan return from Lisne)
—	DF	UKR	Yaroslav Kysil (Loan from LNZ Cherkasy)
—	MF	CGO	Kaya Makosso (Free Agent)
—	MF	UKR	Oleksandr Byelyayev (Free Agent)
—	MF	UKR	Anton Hlushchenko (Loan from Shakhtar Donetsk)
—	MF	UKR	Maryan Faryna (Loan from Shakhtar Donetsk)
—	MF	UKR	Danylo Tuzenko (Loan return from Metalurh Zaporizhzhia)
—	MF	NGA	Victor Adeoye (From (Nigeria) Kwara United)
—	MF	ECU	Jair Collahuazo (From (United States) New York Red Bulls II)
—	FW	MKD	Alban Taipi (From (North Macedonia) Arsimi)

Out:

No.	Pos.	Nation	Player
—	DF	UKR	Vladyslav Shapoval (Loan to Chernihiv)
—	DF	UKR	Ivan Mamrosenko (Released)
—	MF	UKR	Kyrylo Matvyeyev (Released)
—	MF	UKR	Danylo Tuzenko (To Inhulets Petrove)
—	MF	UKR	Anton Demchenko (Loan to Podillya Khmelnytskyi)
—	MF	UKR	Andriy Totovytskyi (Released)
—	MF	UKR	Ivan Losenko (Loan return to Shakhtar Donetsk)
—	MF	UKR	Mykola Vechurko (To SC Chaika)
—	FW	UKR	Dmytro Korkishko (Released)
—	FW	UKR	Oleksiy Lytovchenko (Released)
—	FW	UKR	Denys Bezborodko (To Chernihiv)

=== LNZ Cherkasy ===
In:

No.	Pos.	Nation	Player
—	MF	NGA	Adam Yakubu (From (Slovakia) AS Trenčín)
—	MF	UKR	Artur Mykytyshyn (From Kryvbas Kryvyi Rih)
—	MF	GHA	Abdul Awudu (Loan from (Portugal) Vizela)
—	FW	UKR	Yehor Tverdokhlib (From Kryvbas Kryvyi Rih)

Out:

No.	Pos.	Nation	Player
—	DF	UKR	Oleksandr Kapliyenko (Released)
—	DF	UKR	Ivan Yermachkov (Released)
—	DF	UKR	Yaroslav Kysil (Loan to Kudrivka)
—	MF	NGA	Prosper Obah (to Shakhtar Donetsk)
—	MF	UKR	Davyd Blagodarnyi (loan to (Latvia) Grobiņa)
—	FW	UKR	Artur Avahimyan (Released)
—	FW	CPV	Eynel Soares (Loan to (Slovakia) AS Trenčín)

=== Metalist 1925 Kharkiv ===
In:

No.	Pos.	Nation	Player
—	MF	VEN	Sebastian Castillo (From (Venezuela) Deportivo La Guaira)
—	MF	COL	Nicolás Arévalo (From (Colombia) Millonarios)
—	MF	BRA	Cauan Baptistella (From (Brazil) Cruzeiro)
—	MF	UKR	Valeriy Dubko (Free Agent)

Out:

No.	Pos.	Nation	Player
—	MF	UKR	Maksym Imerekov (Released)

=== Obolon Kyiv ===
In:

No.	Pos.	Nation	Player
—	DF	UKR	Oleksandr Zhovtenko (From Inhulets Petrove)
—	MF	UKR	Roman Volokhatyi (From Inhulets Petrove)
—	MF	UKR	Pavlo Polehenko (Free Agent)
—	MF	UKR	Maksym Tretyakov (Free Agent)
—	FW	UKR	Taras Lyakh (Loan return from Lokomotyv Kyiv)

Out:

No.	Pos.	Nation	Player
—	GK	UKR	Vitaliy Chebotaryov (Released)
—	GK	UKR	Roman Sherstyanykh (Released)
—	DF	UKR	Valeriy Dubko (Released)
—	MF	UKR	Vasyl Kurko (Released)
—	MF	UKR	Oleh Ilyin (Loan return to Kolos Kovalivka)
—	MF	UKR	Yevhen Pasich (Loan return to Metalist 1925 Kharkiv)
—	MF	UKR	Dmytro Semenov (To (Kyrgyzstan) Dordoi Bishkek)

=== Oleksandriya ===
In:

No.	Pos.	Nation	Player
—	MF	UKR	Bohdan Butko (Free Agent)
—	MF	ALG	Yanis Hamache (Free Agent)
—	MF	UKR	Artur Andreichyk (From (Germany) Wacker Burghausen)
—	MF	SEN	Papa Ndiaga Yade (From (Moldova) Sheriff Tiraspol)
—	MF	POR	Mauro Rodrigues (Loan from (Switzerland) Yverdon-Sport)

Out:

No.	Pos.	Nation	Player
—	GK	UKR	Mykyta Shevchenko (Released)
—	DF	FRA	Théo Ndicka (Released)
—	DF	UKR	Ilya Ukhan (Released)
—	MF	UKR	Artem Kozak (Released)
—	MF	UKR	Kyrylo Kovalets (Released)
—	MF	UKR	Yevheniy Smyrnyi (Released)
—	FW	UKR	Andriy Kulakov (Released)

=== Polissya Zhytomyr ===
In:

No.	Pos.	Nation	Player
—	DF	KOS	Ilir Krasniqi (From Kolos Kovalivka)
—	MF	KOS	Lindon Emërllahu (From (Romania) CFR Cluj)
—	MF	UKR	Oleh Fedor (From Karpaty Lviv)
—	FW	UKR	Ihor Krasnopir (From Karpaty Lviv)
—	FW	VEN	Luifer Hernández (Loan return from Chornomorets Odesa)

Out:

No.	Pos.	Nation	Player
—	DF	UKR	Danylo Beskorovaynyi (To (Azerbaijan) Sumgayit)
—	MF	BRA	Talles Costa (Released)
—	MF	UKR	Emil Mustafayev (Loan to (Azerbaijan) Sumgayit)
—	FW	POR	André Gonçalves (Loan to Veres Rivne)
—	FW	VEN	Luifer Hernández (Loan to (Colombia) Cúcuta Deportivo)

=== SC Poltava ===
In:

No.	Pos.	Nation	Player
—	DF	UKR	Bohdan Biloshevskyi (Free Agent)
—	DF	UKR	Illya Ukhan (Free Agent)
—	MF	UKR	Valeriy Sad (From Inhulets Petrove)
—	MF	UKR	Oleksandr Pyatov (From Inhulets Petrove)
—	FW	UKR	Danyil Sukhoruchko (Free Agent)

Out:

No.	Pos.	Nation	Player
—	DF	UKR	Illya Khodulya (Released)
—	DF	UKR	Yevhen Opanasenko (Released)
—	MF	UKR	Yevhen Streltsov (Released)
—	MF	UKR	Artem Onishchenko (Released)
—	MF	UKR	Svyatoslav Shapovalov (Released)
—	MF	UKR	Oleksiy Khakhlyov (Released)

=== Rukh Lviv ===
In:

No.	Pos.	Nation	Player
—	MF	UKR	Mykola Kyrychok (Loan from Karpaty Lviv)
—	MF	SEN	Samba Diallo (Loan from Dynamo Kyiv)
—	FW	BRA	Igor Neves (Loan from Karpaty Lviv)

Out:

No.	Pos.	Nation	Player
—	DF	UKR	Bohdan Slyubyk (To (Czech Republic) Pardubice)
—	DF	UKR	Vitaliy Kholod (To Karpaty Lviv)
—	DF	UKR	Rostyslav Lyakh (To Karpaty Lviv)
—	MF	UKR	Marko Sapuha (To Karpaty Lviv)
—	MF	UKR	Illya Kvasnytsya (To Karpaty Lviv)
—	MF	BRA	Edson Fernando (To Karpaty Lviv)
—	FW	GAM	Baboucarr Faal (To Karpaty Lviv)

=== Shakhtar Donetsk ===
In:

No.	Pos.	Nation	Player
—	MF	NGA	Prosper Obah (From LNZ Cherkasy)
—	MF	UKR	Ivan Losenko (Loan return from Kudrivka)
—	MF	BRA	Maycon (Loan return from (Brazil) Corinthians)
—	MF	BRA	Bruninho (From (Brazil) Athletico Paranaense)

Out:

No.	Pos.	Nation	Player
—	DF	GEO	Luka Latsabidze (Loan to (Denmark) Vejle Boldklub)
—	MF	UKR	Ivan Losenko (Loan to (Canada) CF Montréal)
—	MF	BRA	Maycon (To (Brazil) América Futebol Clube)
—	MF	UKR	Anton Hlushchenko (Loan to Kudrivka)
—	MF	UKR	Maryan Faryna (Loan to Kudrivka)
—	MF	UKR	Danylo Udod (Loan to (Kyrgyzstan) Dordoi Bishkek)
—	MF	UKR	Dmytro Topalov (To (Kazakhstan) Aktobe)
—	FW	TJK	Khusrav Toirov (Loan to (Tajikistan) Istiklol)

=== Veres Rivne ===
In:

No.	Pos.	Nation	Player
—	DF	UKR	Nazar Balaba (Loan return from UCSA Tarasivka)
—	MF	BRA	Guilherme Bahia (From Kryvbas Kryvyi Rih)
—	MF	BRA	Fabrício Yan (Free Agent)
—	MF	GAM	David Noya (Free Agent)
—	FW	POR	André Gonçalves (Loan from Polissya Zhytomyr)

Out:

No.	Pos.	Nation	Player
—	DF	UKR	Nazar Balaba (Released)
—	MF	UKR	Valeriy Kucherov (Released)
—	MF	UKR	Rostyslav Taranukha (To Kolos-2 Kovalivka)
—	MF	GEO	Giorgi Kutsia (Loan to (Georgia (country)) Iberia 1999)
—	FW	CMR	Samuel Nongoh (To (Albania) Elbasani)
—	FW	TUR	Eren Aydın (To (Azerbaijan) Zira)
—	FW	MNE	Marko Mrvaljević (Released)

=== Zorya Luhansk ===
In:

No.	Pos.	Nation	Player
—	MF	UKR	Tymur Korablin (Loan return from Vorskla Poltava)
—	MF	UKR	Fedir Zadorozhnyi (From Dynamo Kyiv)
—	MF	CRO	Domagoj Jelavic (From (Bosnia and Herzegovina) Široki Brijeg)
—	MF	SLE	Sallieu Bah (From (Sierra Leone) Petrolul 95 Ploieşti)
—	FW	PAN	Reynaldiño Verley (From (Panama) Alianza F.C.)

Out:

No.	Pos.	Nation	Player
—	MF	UKR	Tymur Korablin (To (Bulgaria) Fratria)

== Ukrainian First League ==
=== Ahrobiznes Volochysk ===
In:

No.	Pos.	Nation	Player
—	MF	UKR	Ilya Beskorovayny (Free Agent)
—	FW	UKR	Arsen Sheiko (Free Agent)
—	FW	UKR	Oleksandr Starikov (Free Agent)
—	FW	UKR	Nazariy Nych (Free Agent)
—	FW	UKR	Andriy Riznyk (Free Agent)

Out:

No.	Pos.	Nation	Player
—	MF	UKR	Kyrylo Pavlyuk (End Contract)
—	MF	UKR	Andrey Bogoslavsky (End Contract)
—	MF	UKR	Nazariy Bohomaz (End Contract)
—	FW	UKR	Maksym Voytikhovskyi (End Contract)

=== Bukovyna Chernivtsi ===
In:

No.	Pos.	Nation	Player
—	MF	UKR	Oleh Ilyin (From Kolos Kovalivka)
—	FW	UKR	Maksym Voytikhovskyi (Free Agent)

Out:

No.	Pos.	Nation	Player
—	GK	UKR	Nikita Fedotov (Released)
—	DF	UKR	Artem Dashkovets (To (United States) Austin FC II)
—	MF	UKR	Yuriy Hlushchuk (Released)
—	FW	UKR	Maksym Hirnyi (Released)
—	FW	UKR	Andriy Andreychuk (To (Georgia (country)) Gagra)

=== FC Chernihiv ===
In:

No.	Pos.	Nation	Player
—	DF	UKR	Vladyslav Shapoval (Loan from Kudrivka)
—	DF	UKR	Mykyta Teplyakov (Free Agent)
—	FW	UKR	Denys Bezborodko (From Kudrivka)

Out:

No.	Pos.	Nation	Player
—	MF	UKR	Vladyslav Shkolnyi (Released)

=== FC Chornomorets Odesa ===
In:

No.	Pos.	Nation	Player
—	GK	UKR	Maksym Koval (From (Kazakhstan) Elimai)
—	DF	UKR	Oleksandr Kapliyenko (Free Agent)
—	DF	UKR	Denys Gryshkevych (Loan from Polissya-2 Zhytomyr)
—	MF	UKR	Vasyl Kurko (Free Agent)
—	MF	UKR	Vladyslav Klymenko (Free Agent)
—	MF	UKR	Andriy Khoma (Free Agent)
—	MF	UKR	Vitaliy Farasyeyenko (From Inhulets Petrove)
—	MF	UKR	Artur Avahimyan (Free Agent)

Out:

No.	Pos.	Nation	Player
—	GK	UKR	Yan Vichnyi (Released)
—	DF	UKR	Bohdan Biloshevskyi (Released)
—	DF	UKR	Yevhen Khacheridi (Released)
—	DF	UKR	Yaroslav Rakitskyi (Released)
—	DF	UKR	Oleksandr Osman (Released)
—	DF	UKR	Yevheniy Skyba (To (Czech Republic) Karviná)
—	DF	UKR	Maksym Lopyryonok (Released)
—	DF	UKR	Tymofiy Sukhar (Released)
—	MF	UKR	Rostyslav Rusyn (Released)
—	MF	UKR	Oleksandr Sklyar (Released)
—	FW	UKR	Yevheniy Ryazantsev (Loan to Podillya Khmelnytskyi)
—	FW	UKR	Vladyslav Herych (Loan return to Dynamo Kyiv)
—	FW	BRA	João Neto (Released)
—	FW	VEN	Luifer Hernández (Loan return to Polissya Zhytomyr)

=== Inhulets Petrove ===
In:

No.	Pos.	Nation	Player
—	GK	UKR	Dmitry Karlyuk (Free Agent)
—	MF	UKR	Danylo Tuzenko (From Kudrivka)
—	MF	UKR	Danylo Arkusha (From Dnister Zalishchyky)
—	MF	UKR	Oleh Manastyrny (Free Agent)
—	MF	UKR	Yuriy Tlumak (Free Agent)
—	MF	UKR	Yegor Dankovskyi (Free Agent)
—	FW	UKR	Stanislav Ursolov (Free Agent)
—	FW	UKR	Dmitry Bezkleyny (Free Agent)
—	FW	UKR	Yegor Knyazev (From Bukovyna-2 Chernivtsi)

Out:

No.	Pos.	Nation	Player
—	DF	UKR	Oleksandr Zhovtenko (To Obolon Kyiv)
—	MF	UKR	Roman Volokhatyi (To Obolon Kyiv)
—	MF	UKR	Vitaliy Farasyeyenko (To Chornomorets Odesa)
—	FW	UKR	Serhiy Kyslenko (to Feniks-Mariupol)

=== FC Livyi Bereh Kyiv ===
In:

No.	Pos.	Nation	Player
—	MF	UKR	Andriy Chepurnyi (From Lisne)
—	MF	UKR	Illya Kovalenko (From Lisne)
—	MF	UKR	Oleksandr Kalinin (From Lisne)
—	MF	UKR	Ivan Kotukha (From Lisne)
—	MF	UKR	Vikentiy Voloshyn (From Lisne)
—	MF	BRA	Marcel (From (Brazil) Linense)
—	FW	BRA	Thiaguinho (From (Brazil) Esporte Clube Noroeste)
—	FW	UKR	Nazar Voloshyn (From Lisne)

Out:

No.	Pos.	Nation	Player
—	MF	UKR	Taras Halas (Released)
—	MF	UKR	Oleh Kryvoruchko (Loan return to Kolos Kovalivka)
—	FW	UKR	Danyil Sukhoruchko (Released)
—	FW	UKR	Oleh Synytsya (Released)
—	FW	UKR	Andriy Riznyk (Released)

=== Feniks-Mariupol ===
In:

No.	Pos.	Nation	Player
—	DF	UKR	Oleksandr Chornomorets (From Vorskla Poltava)
—	DF	UKR	Nazar Balaba (Free Agent)
—	MF	UKR	Oleh Synytsya (Free Agent)
—	MF	UKR	Valeriy Kucherov (Free Agent)
—	MF	UKR	Andriy Kukharuk (Free Agent)
—	MF	UKR	Rostyslav Rusyn (Free Agent)
—	MF	UKR	Nazar Hrytsak (From Skala Stryi)
—	MF	UKR	Pavlo Orikhovskyi (Free Agent)
—	FW	UKR	Serhiy Kyslenko (From Inhulets Petrove)

Out:

No.	Pos.	Nation	Player
—	MF	UKR	Ivan Orobets (Released)
—	MF	UKR	Nikita Rohachov (Released)
—	MF	UKR	Serhiy Petko (Released)
—	MF	UKR	Orest Panchyshyn (Released)
—	MF	UKR	Valeriy Boldenkov (Released)
—	FW	UKR	Ruslan Buryak (To Prykarpattia-Blaho)
—	FW	UKR	Nazariy Nych (Released)
—	FW	UKR	Ruslan Nepeypiyev (To (Bulgarian Football Union) Hebar)

=== Metalist Kharkiv ===
In:

No.	Pos.	Nation	Player

Out:

No.	Pos.	Nation	Player

=== FC Metalurh Zaporizhzhia ===
In:

No.	Pos.	Nation	Player
—	DF	UKR	Ivan Mamrosenko (Free Agent)
—	DF	UKR	Danylo Izotov (Free Agent)
—	MF	UKR	Serhiy Loginov (From Novi Sanzhary)
—	MF	UKR	Maksym Vorona (From Dinaz Vyshhorod)
—	MF	UKR	Artem Sitalo (Free Agent)
—	MF	UKR	Suleyman Seytkhalilov (Free Agent)

Out:

No.	Pos.	Nation	Player
—	GK	UKR	Heorhiy Klimov (Released)
—	DF	UKR	Dmytro Kostyuchenko (Released)
—	DF	UKR	Denys Chervinskyi (Released)
—	DF	UKR	Mykyta Kuralekh (Released)
—	DF	UKR	Tymofiy Machulyan (Released)
—	MF	UKR	Serhiy Loginov (Released)
—	MF	UKR	Nazariy Pasternak (Released)
—	MF	UKR	Danylo Tuzenko (Loan return to Kudrivka)
—	MF	UKR	Andriy Bliznichenko (Released)

=== Nyva Ternopil ===
In:

No.	Pos.	Nation	Player
—	MF	UKR	Vasyl Burtnyk (Loan return from Dynamo Kyiv)
—	MF	UKR	Taras Halas (Free Agent)

Out:

No.	Pos.	Nation	Player
—	MF	UKR	Yuriy Tlumak (Released)
—	MF	UKR	Andriy Bey (Released)
—	FW	UKR	Dmytro Haladey (To Kulykiv-Bilka)

=== Podillya Khmelnytskyi ===
In:

No.	Pos.	Nation	Player
—	MF	UKR	Nazar Boyko (Free Agent)
—	MF	UKR	Zakhar Boyko (Free Agent)
—	MF	UKR	Mykolay Bystrytskyi (Free Agent)
—	MF	UKR	Kyrylo Leskov (Free Agent)
—	MF	UKR	Serhiy Hamayun (Free Agent)
—	MF	UKR	Roman Bodnya (From Rebel Kyiv)
—	MF	UKR	Anton Demchenko (Loan from Kudrivka)
—	MF	UKR	Vladyslav Shershen (Loan from Kolos Kovalivka)
—	MF	UKR	Oleksiy Bezruchuk (Loan from Kolos Kovalivka)
—	MF	UKR	Maksym Perekhodko (Free Agent)
—	FW	UKR	Yevheniy Ryazantsev (Loan from Chornomorets Odesa)

Out:

No.	Pos.	Nation	Player
—	GK	UKR	Dmytro Fastov (To (Tajikistan) Khatlon)
—	MF	UKR	Danylo Falkovskyi (Released)
—	FW	UKR	Yevheniy Profatylo (Released)
—	FW	UKR	Yuriy Kozyrenko (Released)
—	FW	UKR	Artem Sitalo (Released)

=== Probiy Horodenka ===
In:

No.	Pos.	Nation	Player
—	MF	UKR	Andriy Fesenko (From Skala Stryi)
—	MF	UKR	Andriy Bliznichenko (Free Agent)
—	MF	UKR	Andriy Lyashenko (Free Agent)
—	MF	UKR	Ruslan Tkachenko (Loan from Metalist 1925 Kharkiv)
—	MF	UKR	Daniil Pilhanchuk (Loan from Metalist 1925 Kharkiv)
—	FW	UKR	Maksym Hirnyi (Free Agent)

Out:

No.	Pos.	Nation	Player
—	GK	UKR	Ivan Pitsan (To Prykarpattia-Blaho)
—	DF	UKR	Ivan Bilyi (Released)
—	MF	UKR	Ivan Dmytruk (Released)
—	MF	UKR	Valentyn Pasichnyk (Released)
—	MF	UKR	Roman Holodryga (Released)
—	MF	UKR	Ivan Sondey (Released)
—	MF	UKR	Danylo Volynets (Released)
—	FW	UKR	Vasyl Palahnyuk (Released)

=== Prykarpattia Ivano-Frankivsk ===
In:

No.	Pos.	Nation	Player
—	GK	UKR	Ivan Pitsan (From Probiy Horodenka)
—	FW	UKR	Ruslan Buryak (From Feniks-Mariupol)
—	MF	UKR	Vitaliy Kozenko (Free Agent)
—	MF	UKR	Maksym Maksymets (Free Agent)
—	FW	UKR	Danylo Holub (Loan from Bukovyna Chernivtsi)

Out:

No.	Pos.	Nation	Player
—	GK	UKR	Ivan Shiryaev (Released)
—	DF	UKR	Dmytro Tytov (Released)
—	MF	UKR	Serhiy Romanov (Released)
—	MF	UKR	Andriy Khoma (Released)
—	MF	UKR	Vladyslav Buchakchyiskyi (Released)
—	MF	UKR	Oleksandr Tsybulnyk (Released)

=== UCSA Tarasivka ===
In:

No.	Pos.	Nation	Player
—	MF	UKR	Serhiy Petko (Free Agent)
—	MF	UKR	Oleksandr Osman (Free Agent)
—	MF	UKR	Antoniy Emere (From Uzhhorod)
—	MF	UKR	Oleksandr Shevchuk (From Skala Stryi)

Out:

No.	Pos.	Nation	Player
—	MF	UKR	Oleh Synyohub (Retired)
—	MF	UKR	Nazar Balaba (Released)
—	FW	BRA	Bruno Jesus (Released)

=== Viktoriya Sumy ===
In:

No.	Pos.	Nation	Player
—	MF	UKR	Yaroslav Dobrokhotov (From Lisne)
—	FW	UKR	Pavlo Fedosov (Free Agent)
—	MF	UKR	Oleksandr Vasylyev (From Bukovyna Chernivtsi)

Out:

No.	Pos.	Nation	Player
—	MF	UKR	Suleyman Seytkhalilov (Released)
—	MF	UKR	Ruslan Palamar (Released)

=== Vorskla Poltava ===
In:

No.	Pos.	Nation	Player
—	MF	UKR	Yaroslav Semenyuta (Free Agent)
—	MF	UKR	Ivan Piddubny (Free Agent)

Out:

No.	Pos.	Nation	Player
—	MF	UKR	Daniil Khrypchuk (To Kolos Kovalivka)
—	MF	UKR	Tymur Korablin (Loan return to Zorya Luhansk)
—	FW	UKR	Mykyta Tatarkov (To (Tajikistan) Khatlon)

== Ukrainian Second League ==
=== Atlet Kyiv ===
In:

No.	Pos.	Nation	Player

Out:

No.	Pos.	Nation	Player
—	DF	UKR	Andriy Romanenko (Released)
—	MF	UKR	Dmytro Hlushko (Released)
—	FW	UKR	Andriy Lypovyi (Released)

=== Bukovyna-2 Chernivtsi ===
In:

No.	Pos.	Nation	Player
—	FW	UKR	Danylo Holub (From Bukovyna Chernivtsi)

Out:

No.	Pos.	Nation	Player
—	DF	UKR	Nikita Lednev (Released)
—	MF	UKR	Nazar Kayda (Released)
—	MF	UKR	Yegor Knyazev (Released)

=== Chaika Petropavlivska Borshchahivka ===
In:

No.	Pos.	Nation	Player
—	MF	UKR	Volodymyr Lazarets (Free Agent)
—	MF	UKR	Mykyta Sviderskyi (Free Agent)
—	MF	UKR	Mykhaylo Tymoshenko (From Dinaz Vyshhorod)
—	MF	UKR	Mykhaylo Hopkalo (From Polissya Stavky)
—	FW	UKR	Dmytro Denisyenko (Free Agent)
—	FW	UKR	Mykola Vechurko (From Kudrivka)

Out:

No.	Pos.	Nation	Player
—	MF	UKR	Vladyslav Kulakevych (Released)
—	MF	UKR	Olaksandr Huskov (Released)

=== Chornomorets-2 Odesa ===
In:

No.	Pos.	Nation	Player

Out:

No.	Pos.	Nation	Player

=== Dinaz Vyshhorod ===
In:

No.	Pos.	Nation	Player

Out:

No.	Pos.	Nation	Player
—	MF	UKR	Maksym Vorona (To Metalurh Zaporizhzhia)

=== Hirnyk-Sport Horishni Plavni ===
In:

No.	Pos.	Nation	Player

Out:

No.	Pos.	Nation	Player

=== Kolos-2 Kovalivka ===
In:

No.	Pos.	Nation	Player
—	MF	UKR	Rostyslav Taranukha (From Veres Rivne)
—	MF	UKR	Serhiy Shestakov (From Lisne)

Out:

No.	Pos.	Nation	Player

=== Kulykiv-Bilka ===
In:

No.	Pos.	Nation	Player
—	GK	UKR	Denys Zavhorodniy (From Skala Stryi)
—	GK	UKR	Heorhiy Klimov (Free Agent)
—	MF	UKR	Andriy Bey (Free Agent)
—	MF	UKR	Mykhailo Kashuba (From FC Olesko)
—	FW	UKR	Dmytro Haladey (From Nyva Ternopil)

Out:

No.	Pos.	Nation	Player
—	GK	UKR	Roman Sherekhora (Released)
—	GK	UKR	Roman Dankovych (Released)
—	GK	UKR	Artem Deneha (Released)
—	DF	UKR	Oleksandr Dudarenko (Released)
—	MF	UKR	Vitaliy Ravlyk (Released)
—	MF	UKR	Volodymyr Antoniuk (Loan to Veres U19)

=== Livyi Bereh-2 Kyiv ===
In:

No.	Pos.	Nation	Player
—	MF	UKR	Zakhar Rudoman (Free Agent)

Out:

No.	Pos.	Nation	Player
—	DF	UKR	Ivan Rachuk (Released)
—	MF	UKR	Vladislav Chernenko (Released)
—	MF	UKR	Danylo Hrabovetsky (Released)

=== FC Lisne ===
In:

No.	Pos.	Nation	Player

Out:

No.	Pos.	Nation	Player
—	GK	UKR	Illya Karavashchenko (Loan return to Kudrivka)
—	MF	UKR	Serhiy Rybalka (Retired)
—	MF	UKR	Denys Harmash (Released)
—	MF	UKR	Edvard Kobak (to SC Vilkhivtsi)
—	MF	UKR	Serhiy Shestakov (to Kolos-2 Kovalivka)
—	MF	UKR	Andriy Chepurnyi (to Livyi Bereh Kyiv)
—	MF	UKR	Illya Kovalenko (to Livyi Bereh Kyiv)
—	MF	UKR	Oleksandr Kalinin (to Livyi Bereh Kyiv)
—	MF	UKR	Ivan Kotukha (to Livyi Bereh Kyiv)
—	MF	UKR	Vikentiy Voloshyn (to Livyi Bereh Kyiv)
—	MF	UKR	Yaroslav Dobrokhotov (To Viktoriya Sumy)
—	FW	UKR	Nazar Voloshyn (to Livyi Bereh Kyiv)

=== Lokomotyv Kyiv ===
In:

No.	Pos.	Nation	Player
—	MF	NGA	Saheed Faruk Ikenna (Free Agent)
—	FW	UKR	Illya Zubkov (Free Agent)

Out:

No.	Pos.	Nation	Player
—	GK	UKR	Denis Paliy (Released)
—	DF	UKR	Nazar Nazarenko (Released)
—	MF	UKR	Vladimir Chernetsky (Released)
—	MF	UKR	Daniil Kostyrya (Released)
—	FW	UKR	Alexander Smityukh (Released)
—	FW	UKR	Maksym Maitak (Released)
—	FW	UKR	Taras Lyakh (Loan return to Obolon Kyiv)

=== Nyva Vinnytsia ===
In:

No.	Pos.	Nation	Player
—	MF	UKR	Maksym Vasin (Loan from UCSA)
—	MF	UKR	Nikita Petruk (Loan from UCSA)
—	MF	BRA	Icaro Mendes (Loan from UCSA)
—	MF	UKR	Vitaliy Hemeha (From Podillya Khmelnytskyi)

Out:

No.	Pos.	Nation	Player
—	GK	UKR	Yehor Kolomiets (To (Poland) Wislok Wisniowa)
—	DF	UKR	Borys Lototskyi (To (Kazakhstan) Okzhetpes)
—	MF	UKR	Sergiy Katerynka (Released)
—	MF	UKR	Oleksandr Yevtikhov (Released)

=== Oleksandriya-2 ===
In:

No.	Pos.	Nation	Player

Out:

No.	Pos.	Nation	Player

=== Polissya-2 Zhytomyr ===
In:

No.	Pos.	Nation	Player

Out:

No.	Pos.	Nation	Player
—	DF	UKR	Denys Gryshkevych (Loan to Chornomorets Odesa)

=== Penuel Kryvyi Rih ===
In:

No.	Pos.	Nation	Player

Out:

No.	Pos.	Nation	Player

=== Real Pharma Odesa ===
In:

No.	Pos.	Nation	Player

Out:

No.	Pos.	Nation	Player

=== Rebel Kyiv ===
In:

No.	Pos.	Nation	Player
—	MF	UKR	Yaroslav Bazayev (Free Agent)
—	MF	UKR	Viktor Uliganets (From Polissya-2 Zhytomyr)
—	MF	UKR	Daniil Yushko (Loan from Obolon Kyiv)

Out:

No.	Pos.	Nation	Player
—	MF	UKR	Danyil Titov (Released)
—	MF	UKR	Roman Bodnya (Released)
—	MF	UKR	Renat Chubov (Released)

=== Sambir-Nyva-2 Ternopil ===
In:

No.	Pos.	Nation	Player
—	FW	UKR	Anton Dudik (From (Lithuania) Dainava)

Out:

No.	Pos.	Nation	Player

=== Skala 1911 Stryi ===
In:

No.	Pos.	Nation	Player
—	MF	UKR	Vladyslav Chernenko (From Livyi Bereh-2 Kyiv)
—	MF	UKR	Andriy Vilkhovyi (From Feniks-Mariupol)

Out:

No.	Pos.	Nation	Player
—	MF	UKR	Andriy Fesenko (to Probiy Horodenka)
—	MF	UKR	Bohdan Sahaidak (Released)
—	MF	UKR	Nazar Hrytsak (To Feniks-Mariupol)
—	MF	UKR	Ostap Kravets (Released)
—	MF	UKR	Vadim Merdeev (Released)
—	MF	UKR	Oleksandr Shevchuk (To UCSA)
—	FW	UKR	Artur Fedor (Released)

=== Trostianets ===
In:

No.	Pos.	Nation	Player
—	GK	UKR	Bohdan Vasetskyi (From Vorskla Poltava)
—	MF	UKR	Vladyslav Vasylchenko (From Horishni Plavni)

Out:

No.	Pos.	Nation	Player
—	GK	UKR	Vladyslav Ryabenko (To (Lithuania) Džiugas)

=== Uzhhorod ===
In:

No.	Pos.	Nation	Player
—	GK	UKR	Hlib Bushnyak (Released)
—	MF	UKR	Kyrylo Khovayko (Loan from UCSA)
—	MF	UKR	Matviy Zherebetskyi (Loan from UCSA)
—	MF	UKR	Arsen Bilinsky (From Kudrivka U19)
—	MF	UKR	Maksym Tereshchenko (Free Agent)
—	MF	UKR	Dmytro Rozhko (Free Agent)
—	MF	UKR	Serhiy Rebrysh (From (Czech Republic) Karlovy Vary)

Out:

No.	Pos.	Nation	Player
—	MF	UKR	Antoniy Emere (To UCSA)
—	MF	UKR	Pavlo Tyshchuk (Released)
—	MF	UKR	Ivan Vovkunovych (Released)
—	MF	UKR	Ivan Vovkunovych (Released)
—	FW	UKR	Mykola Shelelyo (Released)
—	FW	UKR	Oleh Vyshnevskyi (Released)

=== Vorskla-2 Poltava ===
In:

No.	Pos.	Nation	Player

Out:

No.	Pos.	Nation	Player

=== Vilkhivtsi ===
In:

No.	Pos.	Nation	Player
—	GK	UKR	Dmytro Kosach (Free Agent)
—	MF	UKR	Edvard Kobak (From Lisne)
—	MF	UKR	Dmytro Humeniak (Free Agent)
—	MF	UKR	Nazar Sapiga (Free Agent)
—	MF	UKR	Arseniy Zhilenko (Free Agent)
—	MF	UKR	Vyacheslav Sobosloy (Free Agent)
—	MF	UKR	Nazariy Bohomaz (Free Agent)

Out:

No.	Pos.	Nation	Player
—	MF	UKR	Dmytro Shostak (Released)
—	MF	UKR	Vladyslav Babkov (Released)
—	MF	UKR	Artem Andritsa (Released)

== See also ==
- Football in Ukraine
- 2025–26 Ukrainian Cup
- 2025–26 Ukrainian Premier League
- 2025–26 Ukrainian First League
- 2025–26 Ukrainian Second League
- 2025–26 Ukrainian Amateur Cup
- 2025–26 Ukrainian Football Amateur League
- 2025–26 Ukrainian Premier League Under-19
- 2025–26 Ukrainian Women's Top League
- List of Ukrainian football transfers summer 2026
