= Vladyslav Vakula =

Ukrainian footballer

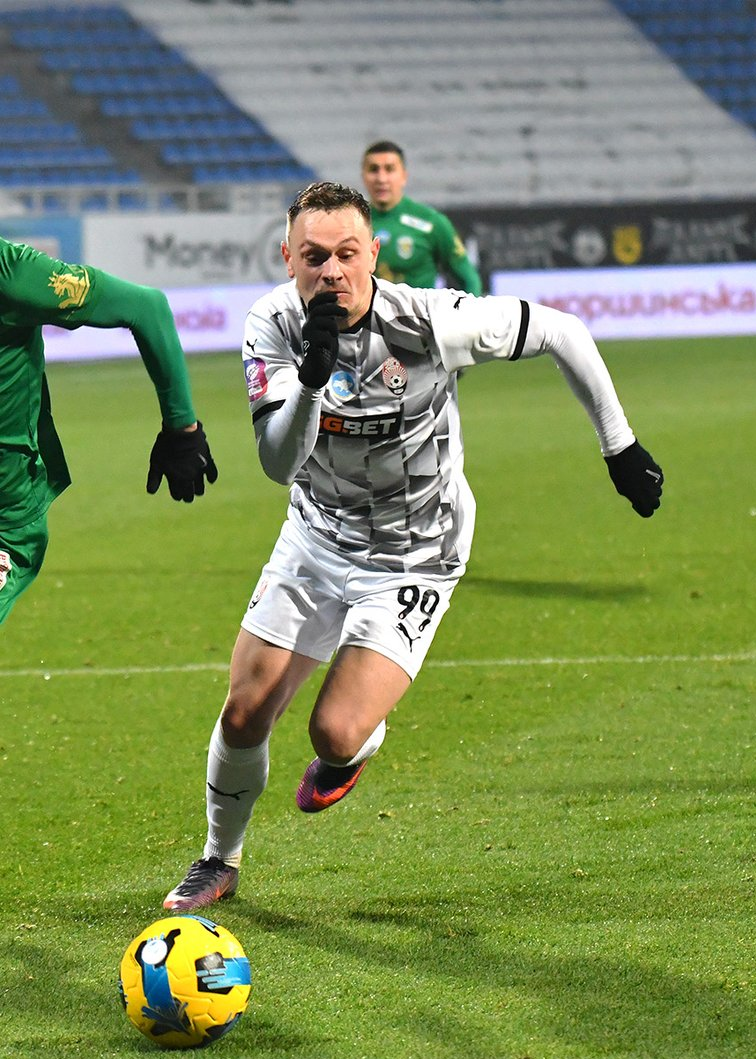

Personal information
- Full name: Vladyslav Olehovych Vakula
- Date of birth: 29 April 1999 (age 27)
- Place of birth: Berdychiv, Ukraine
- Height: 1.73 m (5 ft 8 in)
- Position: Striker

Team information
- Current team: Fratria
- Number: 99

Youth career
- 2010: Darnytsya Sportive School Kyiv
- 2012–2013: Dynamo Kyiv
- 2013: Youth Sportive School Berdychiv
- 2014: UFK Dnipropetrovsk
- 2015: Youth Sportive School Vinnytsia
- 2015: Youth Sportive School Berdychiv
- 2016: UFK-Olimpik Kharkiv

Senior career*
Years	Team	Apps	(Gls)
2016–2018	Stal Kamianske	3	(0)
2018–2019	Mariupol	34	(8)
2019–2022	Shakhtar Donetsk	4	(0)
2019	→ Mariupol (loan)	11	(1)
2021	→ Desna Chernihiv (loan)	0	(0)
2021	→ Vorskla Poltava (loan)	6	(0)
2022	→ Polissya Zhytomyr (loan)	0	(0)
2022–2024	Polissya Zhytomyr	17	(1)
2023	→ Chornomorets Odesa (loan)	7	(0)
2024	Mynai	15	(1)
2024–2026	Zorya Luhansk	13	(0)
2026–	Fratria	3	(1)

International career^{‡}
2019	Ukraine U20	2	(1)
2018–2019	Ukraine U21	3	(0)
- * Club domestic league appearances and goals as of 08:10, 19 November 2026 (UTC) ‡ National team caps and goals as of 23 August 2023

Vladyslav Olehovych Vakula (Ukrainian: Владислав Олегович Вакула; born 29 April 1999) is a Ukrainian professional footballer who plays as a striker for Fratria.

== Career ==
=== Early years ===
Born in Berdychiv, Vakula is a product of the different cities sportive schools.

=== Stal Kamianske ===
In the summer of 2016 Vakula signed a contract with Stal Kamianske and played initially in the Ukrainian Premier League Reserves. He made his debut in the Ukrainian Premier League for Stal Kamianske on 5 August 2017, playing in the match against Karpaty Lviv.

=== Shakhtar Donetsk ===
==== Loan to Desna Chernihiv ====
On 13 January 2021, he moved on loan to Desna Chernihiv until the end of the 2020–21 season. On 25 January, he made his debut with the new team in the friendly match against Partizan. On 30 January, the loan agreement was terminated by Desna and he was expelled by the club for violating the sports regime, and Vakula returned to Shakhtar Donetsk without playing any official match.

==== Loan to Vorskla Poltava ====
In July 2021 he went on loan to Vorskla Poltava and made his debut against Dnipro-1 on 26 July in the Ukrainian Premier League. On 29 July he played in the UEFA Europa Conference League second qualifying round against KuPs, which was lost after two legs.

== Personal life ==
On 8 February 2021, he was involved in a drunken accident in Mariupol, driving a Mercedes in a state of intoxication at about midnight. The incident occurred at the intersection of Flotska and Bakhchivaji streets. A car driven drove onto the sidewalk and knocked down a sign. Fortunately, there were no people on the sidewalk, so no one was hurt. Vladyslav Vakula himself was not injured.

== Career statistics ==
=== Club ===
As of 20 October 2026

Club	Season	League			Cup (Note: Includes Ukrainian Cup)		Continental		Other		Total	
Club	Season	Division	Apps	Goals	Apps	Goals	Apps	Goals	Apps	Goals	Apps	Goals
Stal Kamianske	2017–18	Ukrainian Premier League	3	0	1	0	—		—		4	0
Mariupol	2018–19	Ukrainian Premier League	30	6	0	0	3 (Note: Appearance(s) in UEFA Europa League)	0	—		33	6
Mariupol	2019–20	Ukrainian Premier League	15	3	2	0	2	0	—		19	3
Mariupol	Total		45	9	2	0	5	0	—		52	9
Shakhtar Donetsk	2020–21	Ukrainian Premier League	2	0	0	0	0	0	0	0	2	0
Shakhtar Donetsk	2021–22	Ukrainian Premier League	2	0	0	0	0	0	0	0	2	0
Shakhtar Donetsk	Total		4	0	0	0	0	0	0	0	4	0
Vorskla Poltava (loan)	2021–22	Ukrainian Premier League	6	0	0	0	2 (Note: Appearance(s) in UEFA Conference League)	0	—		8	0
Polissya Zhytomyr	2022–23	Ukrainian First League	17	1	0	0	0	0	0	0	17	1
Chornomorets Odesa (loan)	2023–24	Ukrainian Premier League	7	0	3	0	0	0	0	0	10	0
Mynai	2023–24	Ukrainian Premier League	15	1	2	1	0	0	0	0	17	2
Zorya Luhansk	2024–25	Ukrainian Premier League	13	0	1	0	0	0	0	0	14	0
Zorya Luhansk	2025–26	Ukrainian Premier League	3	0	0	0	0	0	0	0	3	0
Career total			106	10	9	1	7	0	0	0	128	10

== Honours ==
Polissya Zhytomyr

- Ukrainian First League: 2022–23

Shakhtar Donetsk

- Ukrainian Premier League: 2019–20; runner-up: 2020–21
