= Nazariy Vorobchak =

Ukrainian footballer

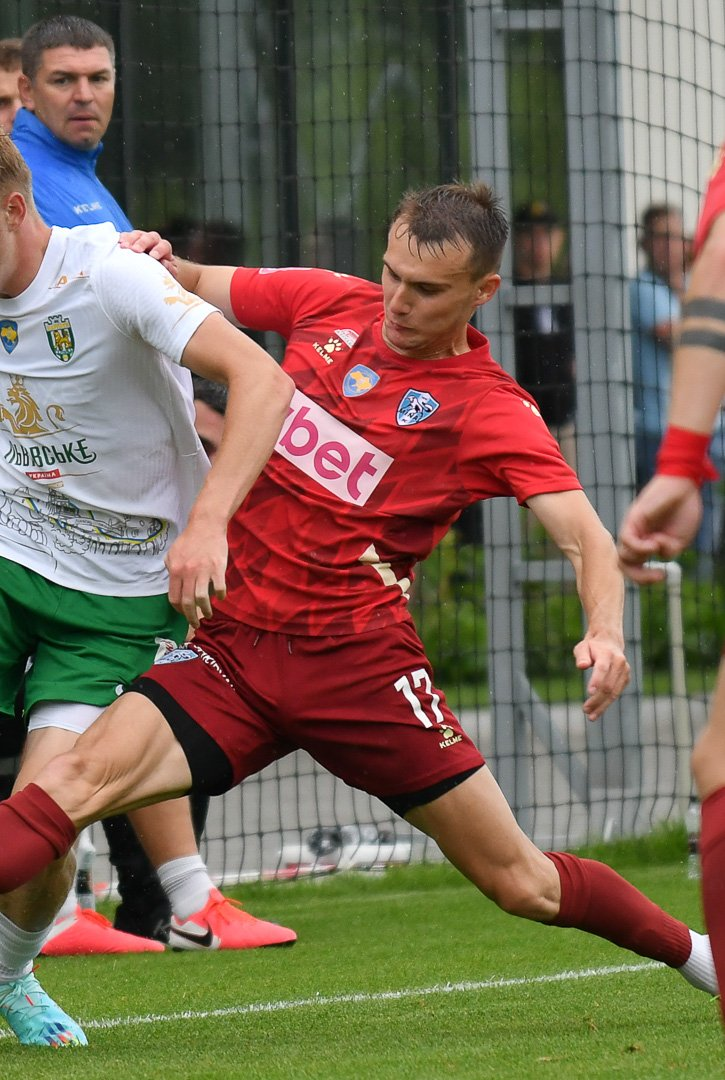

Personal information
- Full name: Nazariy Volodymyrovych Vorobchak
- Date of birth: 22 March 2000 (age 26)
- Place of birth: Burshtyn, Ukraine
- Height: 1.76 m (5 ft 9 in)
- Position: Right midfielder

Team information
- Current team: Livyi Bereh Kyiv
- Number: 17

Youth career
- 2012–2015: UFK-Karpaty Lviv
- 2015–2016: Enerhetyk-DYuSSh Halych
- 2016–2018: Nika Ivano-Frankivsk

Senior career*
Years	Team	Apps	(Gls)
2017	Bystrytsya Vovchynets	5	(0)
2018–2019	Oleksandriya	0	(0)
2019–2020	Karpaty Halych	20	(6)
2020–2022	Prykarpattia Ivano-Frankivsk	57	(5)
2022–2025	Mynai	44	(4)
2025–	Livyi Bereh Kyiv	29	(5)
- * Club domestic league appearances and goals as of 3 June 2026

Nazariy Volodymyrovych Vorobchak (Ukrainian: Назарій Володимирович Воробчак; born 22 March 2000) is a Ukrainian professional footballer who plays as a right midfielder for Ukrainian club Livyi Bereh Kyiv.
