= Dmytro Prikhna =

Ukrainian footballer

Personal information
- Full name: Dmytro Vitaliyovych Prikhna
- Date of birth: 6 June 1995 (age 31)
- Place of birth: Stanychne, Kharkiv Oblast, Ukraine
- Height: 1.84 m (6 ft 0 in)
- Position: Defender

Team information
- Current team: SC Poltava
- Number: 5

Youth career
- 2007–2009: Metalist Kharkiv
- 2009–2010: Helios Kharkiv
- 2011–2012: Vostok Kharkiv

Senior career*
Years	Team	Apps	(Gls)
2013–2014	Illichivets Mariupol	0	(0)
2015	Avanhard Kakhovka	19	(3)
2016	Nyva Berezhany	17	(4)
2017	Nyva Ternopil	25	(0)
2018–2019	Metalist 1925 Kharkiv	11	(2)
2019	Veres Rivne	9	(0)
2019–2020	Tavriya Simferopol	17	(1)
2020	Ridna Borshchivshchyna	5	(1)
2020–2023	Podillya Khmelnytskyi	43	(5)
2022–2023	→ Broń Radom (loan)	19	(4)
2023	Radunia Stężyca	14	(0)
2023–2024	Podillya Khmelnytskyi	22	(1)
2024–2025	Mynai	22	(1)
2025–26	Vorskla Poltava	25	(1)
2026-	SC Poltava	10	(2)
- * Club domestic league appearances and goals as of 30/10/26 @ 12:28(AEST)

Dmytro Vitaliyovych Prikhna (Ukrainian: Дмитро Віталійович Пріхна; born 6 June 1995) is a Ukrainian professional footballer who plays as a defender for Vorskla Poltava.
