= Anton Zadereyko =

Ukrainian footballer

Personal information
- Full name: Anton Vyacheslavovych Zadereyko
- Date of birth: 4 March 1999 (age 27)
- Place of birth: Bystryk, Zhytomyr Oblast, Ukraine
- Height: 1.93 m (6 ft 4 in)
- Position: Goalkeeper

Team information
- Current team: Feniks-Mariupol
- Number: 55

Youth career
- 2011–2016: UFK-Karpaty Lviv

Senior career*
Years	Team	Apps	(Gls)
2016–2020	Karpaty Lviv	0	(0)
2021–2022	Ahrobiznes Volochysk	0	(0)
2022	Podillya Khmelnytskyi	0	(0)
2022–2023	Bukovyna Chernivtsi	8	(0)
2023–2025	Podillya Khmelnytskyi	13	(0)
2025–	Feniks-Mariupol	6	(0)
- * Club domestic league appearances and goals as of 4 June 2026

Anton Vyacheslavovych Zadereyko (Ukrainian: Антон Вячеславович Задерейко; born 4 March 1999) is a Ukrainian professional footballer who plays as a goalkeeper for Feniks-Mariupol.

== Club career ==
=== Ahrobiznes Volochysk ===
He made his professional debut for Ahrobiznes Volochysk in the losing Ukrainian Cup match against Bukovyna Chernivtsi on 18 August 2021.
