= Serhiy Panasenko =

Ukrainian footballer

Personal information
- Full name: Serhiy Oleksandrovych Panasenko
- Date of birth: 9 March 1992 (age 34)
- Place of birth: Dnipropetrovsk, Ukraine
- Height: 1.72 m (5 ft 8 in)
- Position: Central midfielder

Team information
- Current team: Vilkhivtsi
- Number: 92

Youth career
- –2009: Inter Dnipropetrovsk

Senior career*
Years	Team	Apps	(Gls)
2009–2010	Kryvbas Kryvyi Rih	0	(0)
2010–2012	Dnipro-2 Dnipropetrovsk	35	(2)
2012	Kolos Zachepylivka	1	(0)
2012–2013	Hirnyk-Sport Komsomolsk	19	(2)
2013	Slavutych Cherkasy	8	(1)
2013–2014	VPK-Ahro Shevchenkivka	0	(0)
2014–2016	Helios Kharkiv	48	(3)
2016–2017	Inhulets Petrove	19	(2)
2017–2018	Hirnyk-Sport Horishni Plavni	43	(6)
2018–2019	Dnipro-1	15	(1)
2019–2020	Mykolaiv	11	(1)
2020–2022	Veres Rivne	30	(3)
2022–2023	Metalist Kharkiv	25	(3)
2023	Mynai	8	(0)
2024	Inhulets Petrove	8	(1)
2024–	Vilkhivtsi	32	(4)
- * Club domestic league appearances and goals as of 20 June 2024

Serhiy Oleksandrovych Panasenko (Ukrainian: Сергій Олександрович Панасенко; born 9 March 1992) is a Ukrainian professional footballer who plays as a central midfielder for Vilkhivtsi.

== Career ==
On 7 February 2020, Panasenko signed for Ukrainian Second League club Veres Rivne. In summer 2022 he moved to Metalist Kharkiv.
