= Ivan Demydenko =

Ukrainian footballer

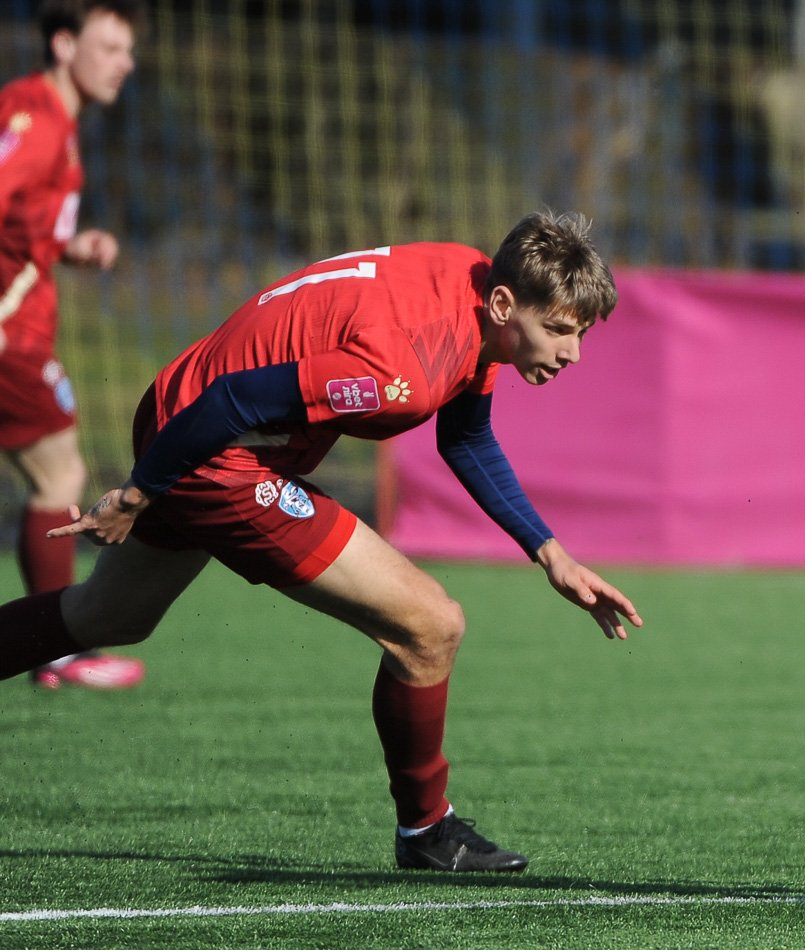

Personal information
- Full name: Ivan Mykhailovych Demydenko
- Date of birth: 11 June 2003 (age 23)
- Place of birth: Kyiv, Ukraine
- Height: 1.93 m (6 ft 4 in)
- Position: Forward

Team information
- Current team: Epitsentr Kamianets-Podilskyi
- Number: 19

Youth career
- 2016–2019: Dynamo Kyiv
- 2019–2020: DYuSSh Kyiv
- 2020: Cherkashchyna
- 2020–2021: Olimpik Donetsk
- 2021–2022: Dnipro-1

Senior career*
Years	Team	Apps	(Gls)
2022	Minija	9	(1)
2023	Asteras Tripolis	2	(0)
2023–2024	Mynai	7	(0)
2024–	Epitsentr Kamianets-Podilskyi	1	(0)
- * Club domestic league appearances and goals as of 10 June 2025

Ivan Mykhailovych Demydenko (Ukrainian: Іван Михайлович Демиденко; born 11 June 2003) is a Ukrainian professional footballer who plays as a forward for Ukrainian First League club Epitsentr Kamianets-Podilskyi.
