= Serhiy Petko =

Ukrainian footballer

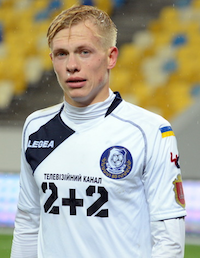
- Petko in 2010

Personal information
- Full name: Serhiy Yuriyovych Petko
- Date of birth: 23 January 1994 (age 32)
- Place of birth: Kharkiv, Ukraine
- Height: 1.83 m (6 ft 0 in)
- Position: Defensive midfielder

Team information
- Current team: UCSA Tarasivka
- Number: 32

Youth career
- 2007–2011: UFK Kharkiv

Senior career*
Years	Team	Apps	(Gls)
2013–2017	Chornomorets Odesa	25	(1)
2017	→ Veres Rivne (loan)	7	(0)
2017	Zhemchuzhyna Odesa	11	(1)
2018–2019	Volyn Lutsk	29	(0)
2019–2022	Veres Rivne	50	(6)
2022	Chornomorets Odesa	2	(0)
2023–2024	Mynai	31	(2)
2024	Inhulets Petrove	5	(0)
2025	FSC Mariupol	16	(1)
2026–	UCSA Tarasivka	10	(0)

International career^{‡}
2015	Ukraine U21	4	(0)
- * Club domestic league appearances and goals as of 4 June 2026 ‡ National team caps and goals as of 3 July 2022

Serhiy Yuriyovych Petko (Ukrainian: Сергій Юрійович Петько; born 23 January 1994) is a Ukrainian professional footballer who plays as a defensive midfielder for UCSA Tarasivka.

== Career ==
Petko is a product of the UFK Kharkiv youth system. Made his debut for FC Chornomorets in the game against FC Dynamo Kyiv on 4 April 2015 in the Ukrainian Premier League.

On 27 June 2022, he decided not to extend his contract with Veres Rivne.

On 7 February 2026, Petko has left FSC Mariupol and joined UCSA Tarasivka. As a player for UCSA, he made his official debut against Chornomorets Odesa on 21 March 2026.
