= Denys Ustymenko =

Ukrainian footballer

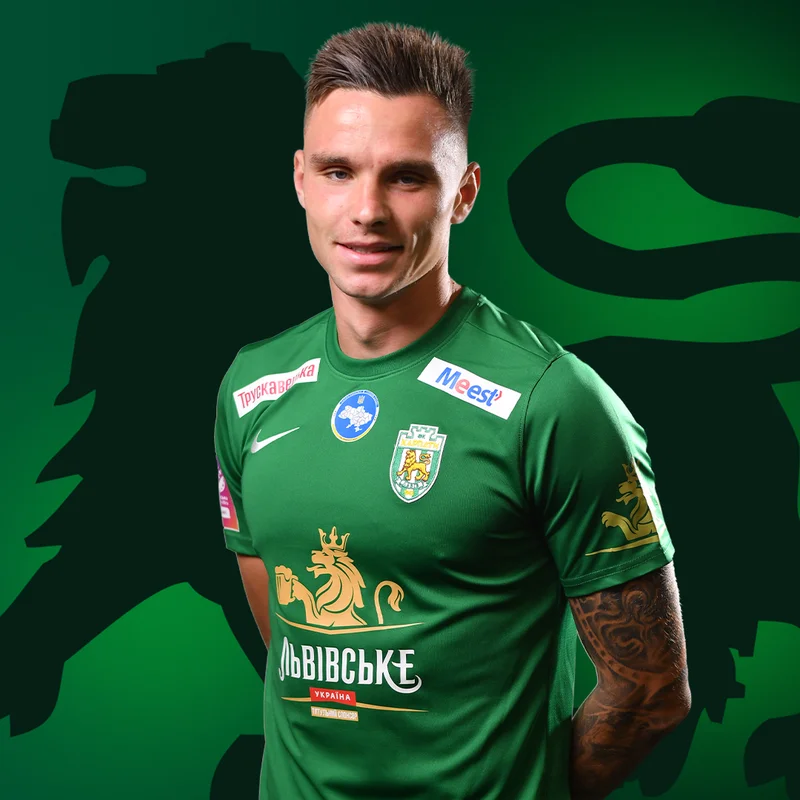

Personal information
- Full name: Denys Olehovych Ustymenko
- Date of birth: 12 April 1999 (age 27)
- Place of birth: Derhachi, Ukraine
- Height: 1.85 m (6 ft 1 in)
- Position: Forward

Team information
- Current team: Obolon Kyiv
- Number: 9

Youth career
- –2012: KhTZ Kharkiv
- 2012–2015: Metalurh Donetsk

Senior career*
Years	Team	Apps	(Gls)
2014–2015	Metalurh Donetsk	0	(0)
2015–2018	Stal Kamianske	0	(0)
2018–2022	Oleksandriya	38	(3)
2022–2025	Kryvbas Kryvyi Rih	24	(0)
2024	→ Mynai (loan)	15	(5)
2024	→ Karpaty Lviv (loan)	12	(1)
2025–	Obolon Kyiv	37	(6)

International career^{‡}
2015	Ukraine U16	3	(0)
2018–2019	Ukraine U20	6	(1)
Medal record
Men's football
Representing Ukraine
FIFA U-20 World Cup
Winner	2019 Poland
- * Club domestic league appearances and goals as of 3 June 2026 ‡ National team caps and goals as of 27 June 2022

Denys Olehovych Ustymenko (Ukrainian: Денис Олегович Устименко; born 12 April 1999) is a Ukrainian professional footballer who plays for Obolon Kyiv.

== Club career ==
He made his Ukrainian Premier League debut for FC Oleksandriya on 27 October 2018 in a game against FC Zorya Luhansk.

== International career ==
Ustymenko was a part of the Ukraine national U20 football team, that won the 2019 FIFA U20 World Cup.

== Honours ==
=== International ===
==== Ukraine U20 ====
- FIFA U-20 World Cup: 2019
