= Mynai Arena =

Stadium in Mynai, Ukraine

- Минай Арена
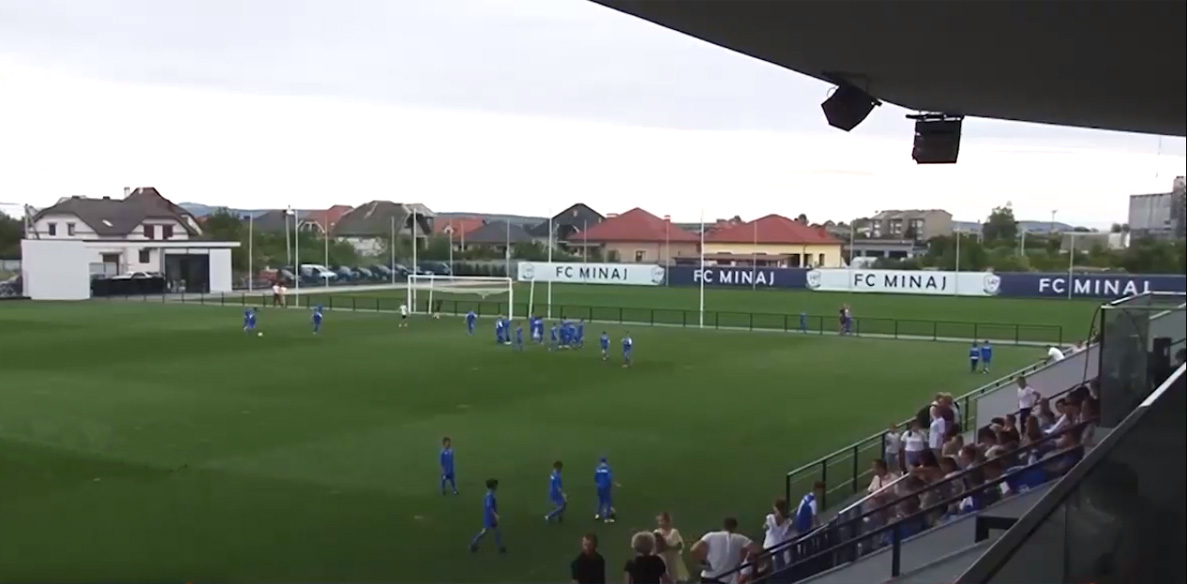
- Interactive map of Mynai Arena
- Location: Mynai, Ukraine
- Coordinates: 48.5900°N 22.2581°E
- Capacity: 1,312
- Surface: Grass

Construction
- Built: 2018
- Opened: 2018; 8 years ago

Tenant
- FC Mynai (2018–present)

Mynai Arena (Ukrainian: Минай Арена) is the main stadium in the village of Mynai, Ukraine. It is the home stadium of FC Mynai.

The stadium has been officially operational since June 9, 2018. "Minai-Arena" accommodates 1,312 fans. However, the attendance record was 3,100 fans at the match of the 1/8 finals of the Cup of Ukraine against Dynamo Kyiv, which took place on October 31, 2018. This became possible thanks to the installation of additional stands.

There are two football fields on the territory of the stadium: size 105x68 m (game), 98x50 m (training) and a field with an artificial surface. There are changing rooms, a VIP sector, a press center, a hostel, a canteen, office premises, a kitchen, as well as a modern scoreboard measuring 6 by 3 meters.

Despite the fact that "Mynai Arena" has the second category, in the 2022/23 and 2023/24 seasons the stadium received permission from the UAF to host UPL matches. The decision was made during the period of martial law in Ukraine because of the Russian invasion of Ukraine.
