= Artur Remenyak =

Ukrainian footballer

Personal information
- Full name: Artur Volodymyrovych Remenyak
- Date of birth: 9 August 2000 (age 26)
- Place of birth: Velykyi Liubin, Ukraine
- Height: 1.81 m (5 ft 11 in)
- Positions: Right winger; right-back

Team information
- Current team: Feniks-Mariupol
- Number: 29

Youth career
- 2012–2016: Lviv

Senior career*
Years	Team	Apps	(Gls)
2016–2017	Lviv	8	(1)
2017–2018	Veres Rivne	0	(0)
2018–2023	Lviv	41	(4)
2023–2025	Mynai	32	(10)
2025	Rukh Lviv	4	(0)
2025–	Feniks-Mariupol	26	(7)

International career^{‡}
2017	Ukraine U17	3	(0)
2021	Ukraine U21	1	(0)
- * Club domestic league appearances and goals as of 4 June 2026 ‡ National team caps and goals as of 7 October 2021

Artur Volodymyrovych Remenyak (Ukrainian: Артур Володимирович Ременяк; born 9 August 2000) is a Ukrainian professional footballer who plays as a winger for Feniks-Mariupol.

== Career ==
Remenyak is a product of the FC Lviv youth sportive school system.

In 2017–18 he was on the roster of Veres Rivne during the Lviv-Veres affair when both clubs swapped places between 1st and 3rd tiers.

He made his debut for FC Lviv as a second half-time substituted player in the winning away match against FC Desna Chernihiv on 22 November 2020 in the Ukrainian Premier League.
