= Roman Bodnya =

Ukrainian footballer

Personal information
- Full name: Roman Serhiyovych Bodnya
- Date of birth: 21 June 2001 (age 25)
- Place of birth: Dnipropetrovsk, Ukraine
- Height: 1.82 m (5 ft 11 1/2 in)
- Position: Midfielder

Team information
- Current team: Podillya Khmelnytskyi
- Number: 8

Youth career
- 2013–2015: Inter Dnipropetrovsk
- 2015–2016: Shakhtar Donetsk
- 2016–2018: Dynamo Kyiv

Senior career*
Years	Team	Apps	(Gls)
2018–2021	Dynamo Kyiv	0	(0)
2021	→ Chornomorets Odesa (loan)	3	(0)
2021–2022	Mynai	0	(0)
2022	Hirnyk-Sport Horishni Plavni	12	(0)
2023–2025	Bukovyna Chernivtsi	36	(2)
2025	Rebel Kyiv	7	(2)
2026–	Podillya Khmelnytskyi	6	(0)

International career^{‡}
2017—2018	Ukraine U17	14	(0)
2019	Ukraine U19	3	(0)
- * Club domestic league appearances and goals as of 4 June 2026 ‡ National team caps and goals as of 31 August 2021

Roman Serhiyovych Bodnya (Ukrainian: Роман Сергійович Бодня; born 21 June 2001) is a Ukrainian football midfielder who plays for Podillya Khmelnytskyi.

== Career ==
Born in Dnipro, Bodnya began his training career in the local FC Inter youth sportive school, and after continued in the FC Shakhtar and FC Dynamo youth sportive systems.

He played in the Ukrainian Premier League Reserves and never made his debut for the senior Dynamo Kyiv's squad. In February 2021 Bodnya signed a half-year loan contract with the Ukrainian First League FC Chornomorets Odesa.

On 7 February 2026, he signed for Podillya Khmelnytskyi.
