= Yevheniy Skyba =

Ukrainian footballer (born 2003)

Personal information
- Full name: Yevheniy Volodymyrovych Skyba
- Date of birth: 25 March 2003 (age 23)
- Place of birth: Bila Tserkva, Ukraine
- Height: 1.90 m (6 ft 3 in)
- Position: Centre-back

Team information
- Current team: Baník Ostrava

Youth career
- 2014–2018: Ros Bila Tserkva
- 2018–2019: Chornomorets Odesa
- 2019–2020: DYuSSh-11 Odesa
- 2020–2022: Mynai

Senior career*
Years	Team	Apps	(Gls)
2022–2025	Mynai	16	(1)
2022–2023	→ Mariupol (loan)	11	(0)
2023–2024	→ Khust (loan)	17	(0)
2024–2025	Chornomorets Odesa	38	(4)
2026	Karviná	9	(0)
2026–	Baník Ostrava	0	(0)
- * Club domestic league appearances and goals as of 27 May 2026

Yevheniy Volodymyrovych Skyba (Ukrainian: Євгеній Володимирович Скиба; born 25 March 2003) is a Ukrainian professional footballer who plays as a defender for Czech club Baník Ostrava.

== Career ==
Skyba is a product of several sports schools in Bila Tserkva, Odesa, and Uzhhorod. In 2020, he started to play for FC Mynai at youth competitions. He made his professional debut when he was loaned out to FSC Mariupol in the away match against Karpaty Lviv on 27 August 2022 in the Ukrainian First League in a 3–0 loss.

On 9 September 2024, Skyba signed a contract with Chornomorets Odesa, making his debut against Inhulets Petrove on 14 September 2024. On 13 May 2025, he was recognized as the player of the UPL Round of 28 by a Ukrainian internet publisher "SportArena". On 16 January 2026, Skyba left Chornomorets and joined Czech First League club MFK Karviná.

== Honours ==
Karviná

- Czech Cup: 2025–26
