= Taras Dmytruk =

Ukrainian footballer

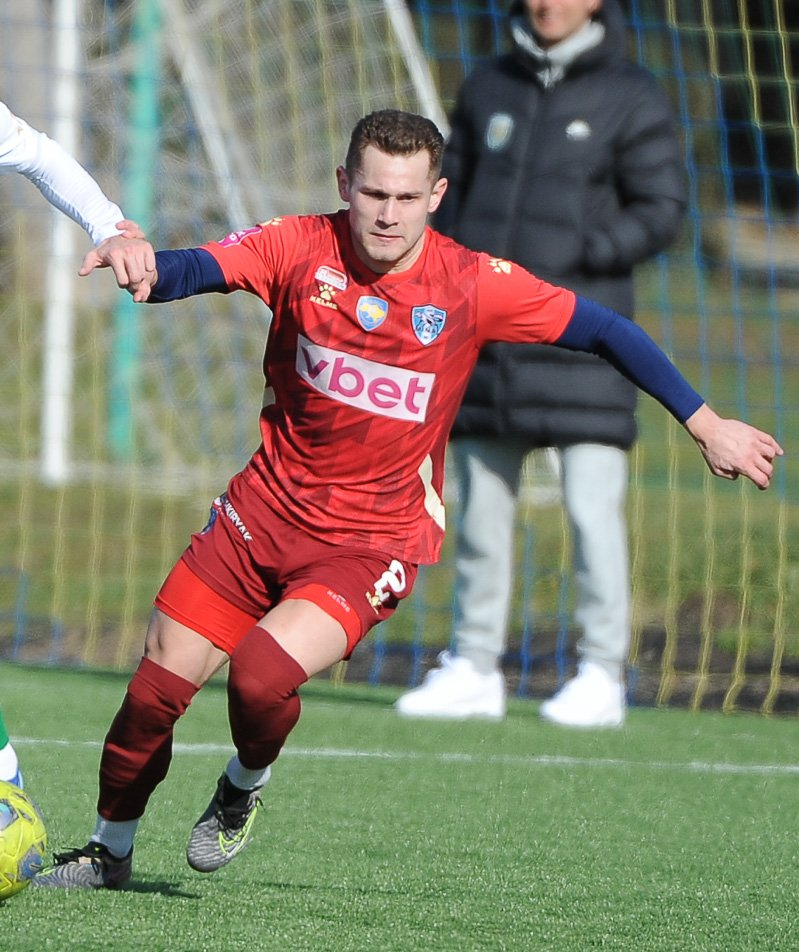

Personal information
- Full name: Taras Valeriyovych Dmytruk
- Date of birth: 9 March 2000 (age 26)
- Place of birth: Novovolynsk, Ukraine
- Height: 1.71 m (5 ft 7 in)
- Position: Defender

Team information
- Current team: Oleksandriya
- Number: 2

Youth career
- 2013–2014: BRW-VIK Volodymyr-Volynskyi
- 2014–2017: Dynamo Kyiv

Senior career*
| Years | Team | Apps | (Gls) |
| 2017–2019 | Dynamo Kyiv | 0 | (0) |
| 2020–2021 | Vorskla Poltava | 3 | (0) |
| 2021 | → Hirnyk-Sport Horishni Plavni (loan) | 8 | (0) |
| 2022–2025 | Mynai | 60 | (1) |
| 2025– | Vorskla Poltava | 26 | (1) |

International career^{‡}
| 2016 | Ukraine U16 | | |
| 2016–2017 | Ukraine U17 | 12 | (1) |
- * Club domestic league appearances and goals as of 3 June 2026 ‡ National team caps and goals as of 2 September 2021

Taras Valeriyovych Dmytruk (Ukrainian: Тарас Валерійович Дмитрук; born 9 March 2000) is a Ukrainian professional footballer who plays as a defender for Oleksandriya.

== Career ==
Born in Volyn Oblast, Dmytruk is a product of local BRW-VIK from Volodymyr-Volynskyi (first trainer Vasyl Hryhorovych) and Dynamo Kyiv youth sportive school systems.

In February 2020 he was signed by Vorskla Poltava. He made his debut as a second half-time substituted player for Vorskla Poltava in the Ukrainian Premier League in an away drawing match against FC Lviv on 3 July 2020.
