= Vladyslav Semotyuk =

Ukrainian footballer (born 2000)

Personal information
- Full name: Vladyslav Mykolayovych Semotyuk
- Date of birth: 14 November 2000 (age 25)
- Place of birth: Ivano-Frankivsk, Ukraine
- Height: 1.77 m (5 ft 10 in)
- Position: Central midfielder

Team information
- Current team: Vorskla Poltava
- Number: 17

Youth career
- –2017: RVUFK Kyiv

Senior career*
Years	Team	Apps	(Gls)
2017–2018	Stal Kamianske	0	(0)
2018–2019	Arsenal Kyiv	1	(0)
2019–2022	Prykarpattia Ivano-Frankivsk	69	(3)
2022–2024	Kryvbas Kryvyi Rih	10	(0)
2024	→ Mynai (loan)	15	(0)
2024	→ Rukh Lviv (loan)	4	(0)
2025	Probiy Horodenka	4	(1)
2025–26	Vorskla Poltava	26	(2)
2026–	FC Kulykiv-Bilka	0	(0)
- * Club domestic league appearances and goals as of 23/10/26 @ 04:36(AEST)

Vladyslav Mykolayovych Semotyuk (Ukrainian: Владислав Миколайович Семотюк; born 14 November 2000) is a Ukrainian professional footballer who plays as a central midfielder for Vorskla Poltava.

== Club career ==
He made his Ukrainian Premier League debut for FC Arsenal Kyiv on 30 September 2018 in a game against FC Dynamo Kyiv.

On 25 July 2024, Semotyuk joined Rukh Lviv on loan.
