= Vadym Vitenchuk =

Ukrainian footballer

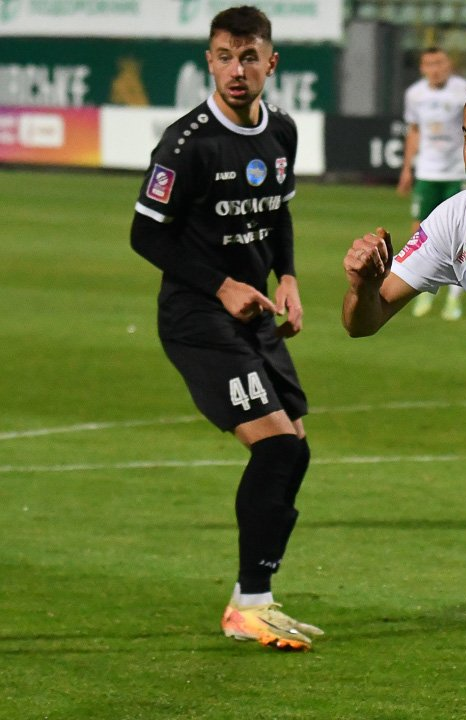

Personal information
- Full name: Vadym Vyacheslavovych Vitenchuk
- Date of birth: 13 January 1997 (age 29)
- Place of birth: Illichivsk, Ukraine
- Height: 1.77 m (5 ft 10 in)
- Position: Defensive midfielder

Team information
- Current team: Bukovyna Chernivtsi
- Number: 44

Youth career
- 2010–2013: Chornomorets Odesa
- 2013–2014: DYuSSh-11 Odesa

Senior career*
Years	Team	Apps	(Gls)
2015–2016	Zorya Luhansk	0	(0)
2016–2019	Oleksandriya	0	(0)
2019–2021	Mykolaiv	56	(1)
2021	→ Mykolaiv-2	2	(0)
2021–2022	Kramatorsk	17	(3)
2022–2024	Mynai	57	(5)
2024–2025	Obolon Kyiv	29	(0)
2025–	Bukovyna Chernivtsi	28	(5)
- * Club domestic league appearances and goals as of 3 June 2026

Vadym Vyacheslavovych Vitenchuk (Ukrainian: Вадим Вячеславович Вітенчук; born 13 January 1997) is a Ukrainian professional footballer who plays as a defensive midfielder for Ukrainian club Bukovyna Chernivtsi.
