= Luifer Hernández =

Venezuelan footballer (born 2001)

Personal information
- Full name: Luifer Enrique Hernández Quintero
- Date of birth: 28 April 2001 (age 25)
- Place of birth: Puerto Cabello, Venezuela
- Height: 1.81 m (5 ft 11 in)
- Position: Forward

Team information
- Current team: Puebla
- Number: 9

Youth career
- –2018: Academia Puerto Cabello

Senior career*
Years	Team	Apps	(Gls)
2018–2024	Academia Puerto Cabello	111	(36)
2024–2026	Polissya Zhytomyr	19	(5)
2025	→ Vinotinto (loan)	4	(1)
2025	→ Chornomorets Odesa (loan)	13	(3)
2026	→ Cúcuta Deportivo (loan)	18	(6)
2026–	Puebla	11	(1)
- * Club domestic league appearances and goals as of 26 October 2026

Luifer Enrique Hernández Quintero (born 28 April 2001) is a Venezuelan professional footballer who plays as a forward for Liga MX club Puebla.

== Club career ==
A graduate of the Academia Puerto Cabello youth academy, Hernández made his competitive debut for the club on 9 May 2018 in a 1-0 league victory over Monagas.

=== Chornomorets Odesa ===
On 5 September 2025, Hernández joined Ukrainian club Chornomorets Odesa, on loan from Polissya Zhytomyr. On 7 September 2025 in the 5th round match of the Ukrainian First League 2025–26 between Chornomorets and Feniks-Mariupol Hernández made his official debut as a player of Chornomorets. On 20 September 2025 in the 7th round match of the Ukrainian First League 2025–26 between Inhulets Petrove and Chornomorets he scored his first goal as a player of Chornomorets. On January 10, 2026, FC Chornomorets announced that Hernandez's loan had ended.

=== Puebla ===
On 2 June 2026, Hernández signed with Liga MX club Puebla.

== International career ==
In June 2023, Hernández took part in the Maurice Revello Tournament in France with Venezuela.
