= Yehor Hunichev =

Ukrainian footballer

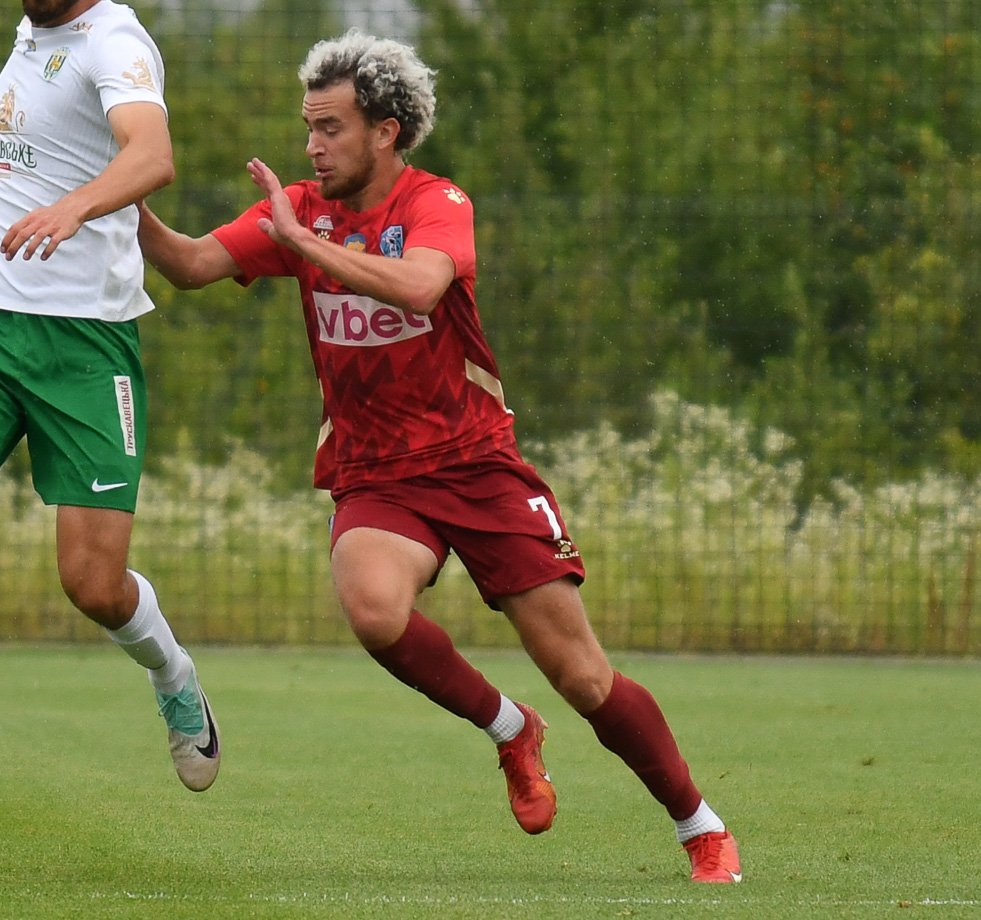

Personal information
- Full name: Yehor Maksymovych Hunichev
- Date of birth: 31 December 2003 (age 22)
- Place of birth: Sloviansk, Ukraine
- Height: 1.80 m (5 ft 11 in)
- Position: Centre-forward

Team information
- Current team: Livyi Bereh Kyiv
- Number: 9

Youth career
- 2016–2019: Serhiy Bubka College
- 2019–: Kramatorsk

Senior career*
| Years | Team | Apps | (Gls) |
| 2020–2022 | Kramatorsk | 31 | (3) |
| 2022–2024 | Oleksandriya | 0 | (0) |
| 2023–2024 | → Mynai (loan) | 22 | (3) |
| 2024–2025 | Mynai | 21 | (0) |
| 2025– | Livyi Bereh Kyiv | 17 | (2) |

International career^{‡}
| 2021 | Ukraine U19 | 1 | (0) |
| 2023 | Ukraine U21 | 1 | (0) |
- * Club domestic league appearances and goals as of 3 June 2026 ‡ National team caps and goals as of 19 June 2025

Yehor Maksymovych Hunichev (Ukrainian: Єгор Максимович Гунічев; born 31 December 2003) is a Ukrainian professional footballer who plays as a centre-forward for Ukrainian club Livyi Bereh Kyiv.
