= Tymur Korablin =

Ukrainian footballer

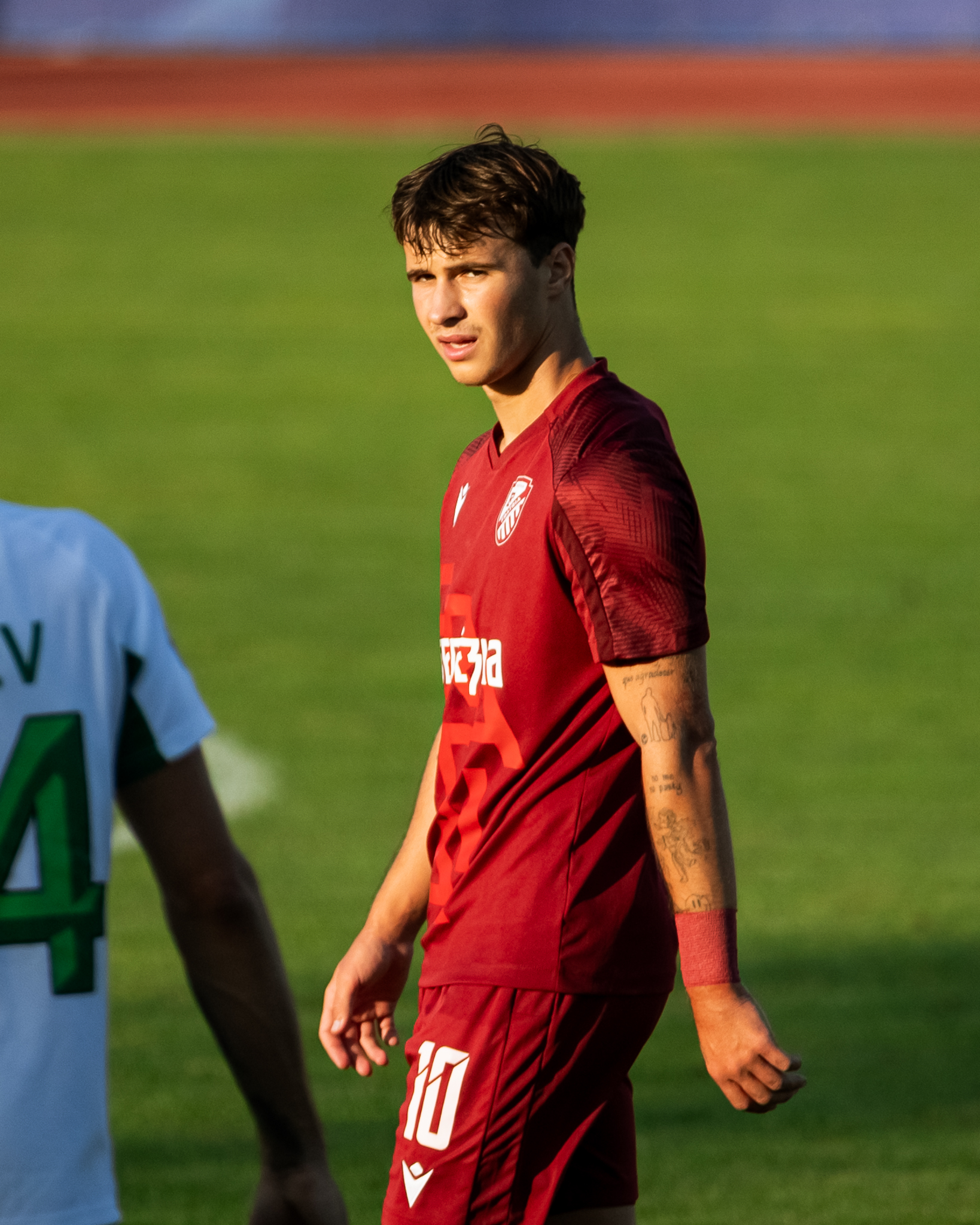

Personal information
- Full name: Tymur Mykhaylovych Korablin
- Date of birth: 2 January 2002 (age 24)
- Place of birth: Zaporizhzhia, Ukraine
- Height: 1.74 m (5 ft 9 in)
- Position: Midfielder

Team information
- Current team: Fratria
- Number: 10

Youth career
- 2011–2019: Metalurh Zaporizhzhia

Senior career*
Years	Team	Apps	(Gls)
2019–2021	Metalurh Zaporizhzhia	0	(0)
2020–2021	→ Metalurh-2	10	(1)
2021	→ OSDYuShOR Zaporizhzhia	7	(7)
2022–2023	Kryvbas Kryvyi Rih	11	(1)
2023–2024	Mynai	23	(4)
2024–2026	Zorya Luhansk	12	(0)
2025–2026	→ Vorskla Poltava (loan)	13	(2)
2026–	Fratria	30	(6)
- * Club domestic league appearances and goals as of 07:32, 20 November 2026 (UTC)

Tymur Mykhaylovych Korablin (Ukrainian: Тимур Михайлович Кораблін; born 2 January 2002) is a Ukrainian professional footballer who plays as a midfielder for Bulgarian Second League team Fratria.

== Career ==
After spending his entire career in Ukraine, until this moment, on 6 February 2026 he was announced as the new signing of Bulgarian Second League team Fratria.
