= Oleh Vyshnevskyi =

Ukrainian footballer

Personal information
- Full name: Oleh Viktorovych Vyshnevskyi
- Date of birth: 4 October 1995 (age 31)
- Place of birth: Perechyn, Ukraine
- Height: 1.79 m (5 ft 10 in)
- Position: Centre-forward

Youth career
- 2011–2012: SDYuSShOR Uzhhorod
- 2012: Uzhhorod
- 2012–2013: SDYuSShOR Uzhhorod

Senior career*
Years	Team	Apps	(Gls)
2014	Serednye	0	(0)
2014	Karpaty Perechyn	0	(0)
2014–2016	Agrifop Stakčín	5	(2)
2015	→ Snina (loan)	21	(2)
2016	→ Snina (loan)	11	(4)
2016	Uzhhorod	1	(0)
2016–2019	Snina	56	(55)
2018	→ Košice (loan)	10	(11)
2019–2021	Košice	24	(18)
2021	Uzhhorod	13	(5)
2021–2023	Mynai	52	(7)
2024	Obolon Kyiv	11	(0)
2024	Mynai	10	(1)
2025–	Uzhhorod	2	(0)
- * Club domestic league appearances and goals as of 21 April 2025

Oleh Viktorovych Vyshnevskyi (Ukrainian: Олег Вікторович Вишневський; born 4 October 1995) is a Ukrainian professional footballer who plays as a centre-forward.
