= Heorhiy Klimov =

Ukrainian footballer

Personal information
- Full name: Heorhiy Oleksiyovych Klimov
- Date of birth: 7 June 2000 (age 26)
- Place of birth: Kyiv, Ukraine
- Height: 1.97 m (6 ft 6 in)
- Position: Goalkeeper

Team information
- Current team: Kulykiv-Bilka
- Number: 32

Youth career
- 2014–2015: CSKA Kyiv
- 2015–2019: Kolos Kovalivka

Senior career*
Years	Team	Apps	(Gls)
2019–2020	Kolos Kovalivka	0	(0)
2020–2023	Hirnyk-Sport Horishni Plavni	12	(0)
2023–2024	Nyva Buzova	18	(0)
2024–2025	Viktoriya Sumy	0	(0)
2025	Metalurh Zaporizhzhia	0	(0)
2026–	Kulykiv-Bilka	1	(0)
- * Club domestic league appearances and goals as of 4 June 2026

Heorhiy Oleksiyovych Klimov (Ukrainian: Георгій Олексійович Клімов; born 7 June 2000) is a Ukrainian professional footballer who plays as a goalkeeper for Ukrainian club Kulykiv-Bilka.
