= Pavlo Tyshchuk =

Ukrainian footballer (born 1997)

Personal information
- Full name: Pavlo Ihorovych Tyshchuk
- Date of birth: 28 June 1997 (age 29)
- Place of birth: Uzhhorod, Ukraine
- Height: 1.80 m (5 ft 11 in)
- Position: Right winger

Team information
- Current team: Mynai
- Number: 10

Youth career
- 2010–2014: SDYuSShOR Uzhhorod
- 2013: → Serednye (loan)

Senior career*
Years	Team	Apps	(Gls)
2014	Serednye		
2014–2015	Hoverla Uzhhorod	0	(0)
2015–2016	Skala Stryi	0	(0)
2016	Spartakus Uzhhorod	11	(1)
2017	Olimpik Donetsk	0	(0)
2017–2018	Horné Saliby	8	(1)
2018	Serednye	18	(8)
2019–2020	Stará Říše	21	(1)
2019–2020	Stará Říše B	12	(12)
2020–2021	Uzhhorod	29	(2)
2022–2023	Skala Stryi	13	(4)
2023–2024	Vilkhivtsi	8	(3)
2024–	Mynai	14	(0)
- * Club domestic league appearances and goals as of 10 June 2025

Pavlo Ihorovych Tyshchuk (Ukrainian: Павло Ігорович Тищук; born 28 June 1997) is a Ukrainian professional footballer who plays as a right winger for Mynai.
