= Yehor Tverdokhlib =

Ukrainian footballer

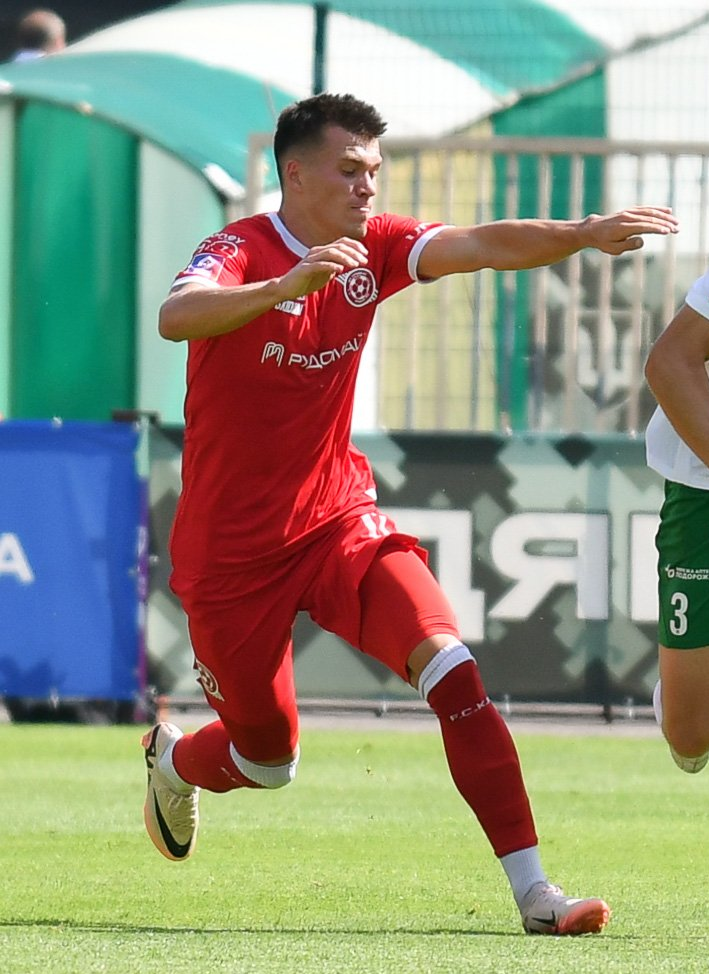

Personal information
- Full name: Yehor Mykhaylovych Tverdokhlib
- Date of birth: 17 December 2000 (age 25)
- Place of birth: Borova, Ukraine
- Height: 1.82 m (6 ft 0 in)
- Position: Attacking midfielder

Team information
- Current team: LNZ Cherkasy
- Number: 22

Youth career
- 2013–2014: Dynamo Kyiv
- 2014–2018: Chayka Vyshhorod

Senior career*
Years	Team	Apps	(Gls)
2018–2019	Chayka Vyshhorod	20	(6)
2019	Atlet Kyiv	14	(13)
2020–2022	Hirnyk-Sport Horishni Plavni	57	(7)
2022–2023	Mynai	45	(7)
2024–2025	Kryvbas Kryvyi Rih	46	(22)
2026–	LNZ Cherkasy	11	(1)
- * Club domestic league appearances and goals as of 3 June 2026

Yehor Mykhaylovych Tverdokhlib (Ukrainian: Єгор Михайлович Твердохліб; born 17 December 2000) is a Ukrainian professional footballer who plays as an attacking midfielder for Ukrainian club LNZ Cherkasy.

== Honours ==
Individual

- Ukrainian Premier League Player of the Round: 2025–26 (Round 4)
