= Ivan Pitsan =

Ukrainian footballer

Personal information
- Full name: Ivan Ihorovych Pitsan
- Date of birth: 19 January 1990 (age 36)
- Place of birth: Kalush, Soviet Union (now Ukraine)
- Height: 1.91 m (6 ft 3 in)
- Position: Goalkeeper

Team information
- Current team: Prykarpattia-Blaho
- Number: 24

Youth career
- 2002–2005: SDYuShOR Kalush
- 2005–2007: UFK Lviv

Senior career*
Years	Team	Apps	(Gls)
2007–2012	Karpaty Lviv	0	(0)
2007–2009	→ Karpaty-2 Lviv	19	(0)
2011	→ Sambir (loan)	1	(0)
2011	→ Prykarpattia Ivano-Frankivsk (loan)	5	(0)
2012	→ Lviv (loan)	8	(0)
2012–2013	Dinamo Batumi	18	(0)
2013	→ Dinamo Batumi II	1	(0)
2014	Stal Alchevsk	3	(0)
2015	Stal Dniprodzerzhynsk	1	(0)
2015–2017	Obolon-Brovar Kyiv	5	(0)
2017	Kalush	9	(0)
2018–2024	Prykarpattia Ivano-Frankivsk	66	(0)
2024–2025	Probiy Horodenka	9	(0)
2026–	Prykarpattia Ivano-Frankivsk	0	(0)

International career^{‡}
2007–2008	Ukraine U18	3	(0)
2008–2009	Ukraine U19	2	(0)
- * Club domestic league appearances and goals as of 4 June 2026 ‡ National team caps and goals as of 23 February 2014

Ivan Ihorovych Pitsan (Ukrainian: Іван Ігорович Піцан; born 19 January 1990) is a Ukrainian professional footballer who plays as a goalkeeper for Prykarpattia Ivano-Frankivsk.

He is the product of Youth Sportive School in his native city Kalush and UFK Lviv. His first trainer was Ihor Vasylkiv. Pitsan was the member of different Ukrainian national youth football teams.

== Honours ==
Probiy Horodenka

- Ukrainian Second League: 2024–25
