= Danylo Holub =

Ukrainian footballer

Personal information
- Full name: Danylo Olehovych Holub
- Date of birth: 3 July 2003 (age 23)
- Place of birth: Vuhledar, Ukraine
- Height: 1.76 m (5 ft 9 in)
- Position: Centre-forward

Team information
- Current team: Prykarpattia-Blaho (on loan from Bukovyna Chernivtsi)
- Number: 8

Youth career
- 2015–2016: Azovstal Mariupol
- 2016–2018: Shakhtar Donetsk
- 2018–2020: Mariupol
- 2020: Inhulets Petrove
- 2021: Kolos Kovalivka
- 2021–2022: Mynai

Senior career*
Years	Team	Apps	(Gls)
2022–2024	Mynai	11	(1)
2024	Chornomorets Odesa	2	(0)
2024–25	Bukovyna Chernivtsi	13	(0)
2025-26	Bukovyna-2 Chernivtsi	4	(0)
2025–26	→ Prykarpattia-Blaho (loan)	8	(0)
2026-	FC Lokomotyv Kyiv	10	(0)
- * Club domestic league appearances and goals as of 23/10/26 @ 13:40(AEST)

Danylo Olehovych Holub (Ukrainian: Данило Олегович Голуб; born 3 July 2003) is a Ukrainian professional footballer who plays as a forward for Ukrainian First League club Prykarpattia-Blaho on loan from Bukovyna Chernivtsi.

== Club career ==
In January 2024 Holub became a player of Chornomorets Odesa. In July 2024 Holub became a player of Bukovyna Chernivtsi.
