= Emil Mustafayev =

Azеrbaijani footballer (born 2001)

Personal information
- Full name: Emil Ramil ohly Mustafayev
- Date of birth: 24 September 2001 (age 25)
- Place of birth: Kirovohrad, Ukraine
- Height: 1.74 m (5 ft 9 in)
- Position: Midfielder

Team information
- Current team: Sumgayit (on loan from Polissya Zhytomyr)

Youth career
- 2007–2015: Pioner Kirovohrad
- 2013: → Dobro Kyiv (loan)
- 2015–2016: Youth Sportive School #2 Kirovohrad
- 2016: Ametyst Oleksandriya
- 2016–2017: Pyatykhatky

Senior career*
Years	Team	Apps	(Gls)
2017–2018	Tarasivka (futsal)	15	(12)
2018–2023	Oleksandriya	24	(2)
2023–	Polissya Zhytomyr	29	(3)
2025	→ Chornomorets Odesa (loan)	11	(0)
2025–	→ Sumgayit (loan)	14	(1)

International career^{‡}
2021–2022	Azerbaijan U21	3	(0)
2024–	Azerbaijan	5	(0)
- * Club domestic league appearances and goals as of 14 June 2026 ‡ National team caps and goals as of 14 June 2025

Emil Ramil ohly Mustafayev (Azerbaijani: Emil Ramil oğlu Mustafayev; Ukrainian: Еміль Раміль огли Мустафаєв; born 24 September 2001) is a professional footballer who plays as a midfielder for Sumgayit FK, on loan from Polissya Zhytomyr. Born in Ukraine, he represents the Azerbaijan national team.

== Career ==
Mustafayev is a product of the different youth sportive school systems from Kirovohrad Oblast and was playing a football from age 5 years old.

He also played a one season in a futsal FC Tarasivka.

=== Oleksandriya ===
In August 2018 Mustafayev signed a deal with the Ukrainian Premier League club FC Oleksandriya and made his debut in the Ukrainian Premier League on 9 May 2021, playing as the second half-time substituted player in an away losing match against FC Zorya Luhansk.

=== Polissya Zhytomyr ===
In July 2023 he signed a deal with the Ukrainian Premier League club Polissya Zhytomyr.

=== Loan to Chornomorets Odesa ===
In January 2025 Mustafayev went on loan to Chornomorets Odesa. He made his debut against Kolos Kovalivka on 21 February 2025.

== International career ==
Mustafayev was born in Ukraine, but because he is of Azerbaijani descent, was called up to the Azerbaijan national under-21 team in November 2021.

Mustafayev made his debut for the senior Azerbaijan national team on 22 March 2024 in a friendly against Mongolia national team.
