= Mynai =

Mynai Минай Minaj
- Village
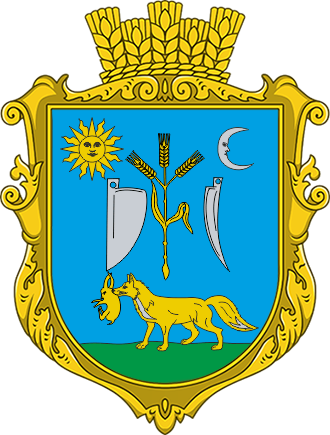
- Coat of arms

- Location in Ukraine Mynai (Zakarpattia Oblast)
- Coordinates: 48°35′31″N 22°16′40″E
- Country: Ukraine
- Oblast: Zakarpattia Oblast
- Raion: Uzhhorod Raion

Area
  - Total: 3.882 km^{2} (1.499 sq mi)

Population (2001)
  - Total: 3,088
- Time zone: UTC+2 (EET)
  - Summer (DST): UTC+3 (EEST)
- Postal code: 89427

Mynai or Minaj, (Ukrainian: Минай; Hungarian: Minaj) is a village in Uzhhorod Raion, Zakarpattia Oblast, Ukraine. The village has a population of 3,088. The village is adjacent to the city of Uzhhorod. Mynai is the second biggest village in the raion. The village is de jure a village, but is de facto a well urbanized place. It is separated from Uzhhorod by Mozhaiskoho Street. In close vicinity is a border with Slovakia and the European Union.

== Overview ==
In the first written records of the settlement in 1273, it is named Ninay. The village is mentioned at least since the 15th century as private community which was passed from one nobleman to another. Sometimes after 1422 it changed its name from Ninay (or Ninai, Nyna, Ninye) to Minaj (Mynai in slavic languages). In the 16th century the village belonged to Ung domini which was governed by some member of Drugeth family. Among some members of the family Gábor Drugeth owned some land lots in Minaj since 1453. It is assumed by some local history researchers (Ludvik Filip) that the name of the village derived from some of its owners Mynayi to whom the village belonged in 1422–1424. According to "Geographic dictionary of Hungary" by Elek Fényes, Minaj was located in Ung comitat quarter mile away from Ungvár. In 1910, 350, mostly Hungarian people lived in Minaj. The village belonged to Hungary until 1920, when it became part of the newly formed Czechoslovakia. In 1938, it was given back to Hungary, but after World War II, along with the whole Subcarpathia, became part of the Soviet Union.

The main church of the village was Sts Peter and Paul Greek Catholic church which exists since at least 1751. Beside it, there also was a reformist church (Calvinism). In 1908 the church of Sts Peter and Paul was rebuilt out of stone in place of a wooden one. With arrival of the Soviet regime, the church was soon closed after the Greek Catholic Eparchy of Mukachevo was liquidated in 1949. In 1963 the temple was turned into a warehouse. During dissolution of the Soviet Union, the Greek Catholic community was revived on 31 July 1991. On 16 October 1991 the damaged temple was handed back to the community. The Theodore Romzha Theological Academy of the Greek Catholic Eparchy of Mukachevo is located at the entrance to the village.

In 2016 as part of decommunization in Ukraine, the village's square Zhovtneva was renamed in honor of American artist of Lemko descent Andy Warhol.

In 2018 the local football club FC Mynai owned by a chief of Chop customs debuted in Ukrainian professional football competitions. They debuted in 2020 in the Ukrainian Premier League.

== Gallery ==
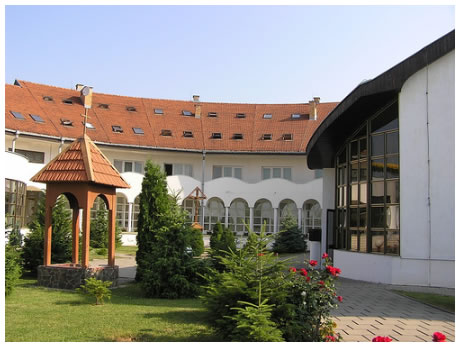
Theological Academy

== See also ==
- FC Mynai
