= Oleh Synytsya =

Ukrainian footballer

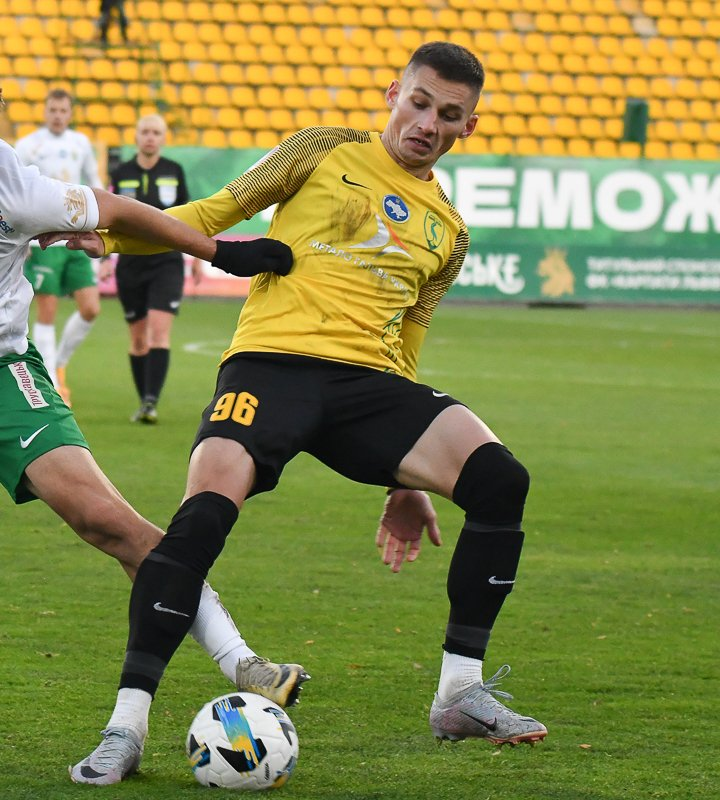

Personal information
- Full name: Oleh Viktorovych Synytsya
- Date of birth: 20 March 1996 (age 30)
- Place of birth: Kharkiv, Ukraine
- Height: 1.77 m (5 ft 9 1/2 in)
- Position: Midfielder

Team information
- Current team: Feniks-Mariupol
- Number: 96

Youth career
- 2002–2013: Metalist Kharkiv

Senior career*
Years	Team	Apps	(Gls)
2013–2016	Metalist Kharkiv	4	(0)
2016–2019	Metalist 1925 Kharkiv	76	(24)
2019–2020	Rukh Lviv	26	(0)
2021	Ventspils	12	(0)
2021–2022	Ahrobiznes Volochysk	20	(1)
2022–2023	Świt Szczecin	41	(13)
2023–2025	Livyi Bereh Kyiv	64	(7)
2026–	Feniks-Mariupol	12	(1)
- * Club domestic league appearances and goals as of 4 June 2026

Oleh Viktorovych Synytsya (Ukrainian: Олег Вікторович Синиця; born 20 March 1996) is a Ukrainian professional footballer who plays as a midfielder for Feniks-Mariupol.

== Career ==
Synytsya is a product of the FC Metalist School System, where he trained from age 6. From 2009 till 2013 he played 38 games and scored 1 goal in the Ukrainian Youth Football League.

On 31 July 2013 he made his debut for Metalist U-19 team in a match against Zorya Luhansk.

On 1 August 2014 he made his debut for Metalist U-21 team against Dynamo Kyiv U-21 Team.

On 8 April 2015 he made his debut for FC Metalist as a substitute in a match against FC Shakhtar Donetsk on 73 minute of game.

He made his debut for FC Metalist in the match against FC Chornomorets Odesa on 6 December 2015 in the Ukrainian Premier League.
