= FC Feniks-Mariupol =

Feniks-Mariupol
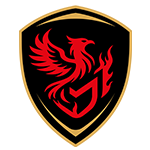
- Full name: Feniks-Mariupol
- Founded: 2007
- Ground: Azovets Stadium, Mariupol; Zakhidnyi Stadium, Mariupol (due to Russian invasion of Ukraine, moved to Kolos Stadium, Boryspil)
- Capacity: 3,206
- Chairman: Oleksandr Yaroshenko
- Manager: Maksym Feshchuk
- League: Ukrainian First League
- 2024–25: Ukrainian First League, 13th of 20
- Website: fcfeniks.org.ua
Home colours	Away colours

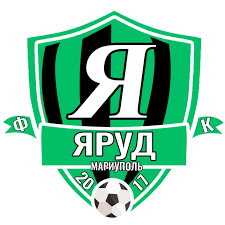
Logo of Yarud in 2020–2022

Logo of Mariupol in 2022–2023

FSC Mariupol (Ukrainian: Футбольний спортивний клуб «Маріуполь») is a Ukrainian professional football club based in the city of Mariupol. The team currently plays in the Ukrainian First League.

The club currently plays its home games near Kyiv in Demydiv (Dinaz Stadium, 2022–23) and Boryspil (Kolos Stadium, 2023–24), due to the destruction and occupation of Mariupol by Russia.

== History ==
The team was founded in 2007 as Lider. In 2017 the club changed its name to Yarud. It debuted in the Ukrainian Second League in the 2020–21 season, adopting its current name—FSC Mariupol—at the start of the next season as another FC Mariupol was forced to withdraw from competition due to the ongoing war in Ukraine.

In 2023-2024 the club struggled financially and by the start of 2025 it was bought out by an amateur club Feniks Pidmonastyr from Lviv Oblast.

=== Home stadium ===
The club originally was playing at Azovets Stadium located in the city center of Mariupol near the city park. Sometime in 2020 it moved to newer Zakhidnyi Stadium.

Due to the Russian full-scale invasion of Ukraine in 2022, Yarud was rebranded and moved to Kyiv suburbs Vyshhorod at first and then Boryspil.

Since the second half of the season 2024–25 team uses SKIF Stadium in Lviv as home ground.

== Current squad ==
As of 10 September 2026

Note: Flags indicate national team as defined under FIFA eligibility rules; some limited exceptions apply. Players may hold more than one non-FIFA nationality.

No.	Pos.	Nation	Player
1	GK	UKR	Vitaliy Zhupanskyi
2	MF	UKR	Roman Hahun
3	DF	UKR	Danylo Sydorenko
5	MF	UKR	Oleksiy Khakhlyov
6	FW	UKR	Yehor Hunichev
7	FW	UKR	Roman Kovalyuk
8	MF	UKR	Andriy Kukharuk
9	FW	UKR	Serhiy Kyslenko
10	MF	UKR	Pavlo Orikhovskyi
11	MF	UKR	Valeriy Kucherov
12	GK	UKR	Svyatoslav-Mykhaylo Oryshchak
14	MF	UKR	Nazar Hrytsak

No.	Pos.	Nation	Player
15	DF	UKR	Oleksandr Chornomorets
17	MF	UKR	Pavlo Maletskyi
20	DF	UKR	Oleksandr Nikolyshyn
21	DF	UKR	Kevin Tsyupalevych-Semochko
22	MF	UKR	Marko Podolyak
29	FW	UKR	Artur Remenyak
33	DF	UKR	Vladyslav Sydorenko
39	DF	UKR	Denys Balan
55	GK	UKR	Anton Zadereyko
84	DF	UKR	Andriy Kusyi
96	FW	UKR	Oleh Synytsya
97	DF	UKR	Oleksandr Hereha

=== Out on loan ===
Note: Flags indicate national team as defined under FIFA eligibility rules; some limited exceptions apply. Players may hold more than one non-FIFA nationality.

No. / Pos. / Nation / Player	No. / Pos. / Nation / Player

== League and cup history ==
Season	Div.	Pos.	Pl.	W	D	L	GS	GA	P	Domestic Cup	Europe		Notes
Yarud Mariupol
2017–18	4th Group 3 (Amateur Championship)	7	16	4	5	7	20	19	17	Amateur	-	-	-
2018–19	4th Group 3 (Amateur Championship)	9	22	6	6	10	24	20	24	-	-	-	-
2019–20	4th Group 3 (Amateur Championship)	4	18	12	3	3	37	14	39	Amateur	-	-	Promoted
FSC Mariupol
2020–21	3rd"B" (Second League)	6	22	8	4	10	27	39	28	1/64 finals	-	-	-
2021–22	3rd"B" (Second League)	11	20	6	6	8	36	29	24	1/64 finals	-	-	began on 24.02.2022 Russian invasion of Ukraine Admitted to Ukrainian First League
2022–23	2nd (First League)	15	14	3	3	8	18	23	12	Not played	-	-	-
2023–24	2nd (First League)	9	28	8	13	7	29	26	37	1/32 finals	-	-	-
2024–25	2nd"B" (First League)	6_{/9}	16	5	3	8	17	23	18	1/64 finals	-	-	to the Relegation group
2024–25	2nd"Relegation Group" (First League)	13_{/17}	24	8	4	12	26	34	28	1/64 finals	-	-	merger with Feniks Pidmonastyr
Feniks-Mariupol
2025–26	2nd (First League)	9_{/16}	30	9	9	12	31	32	36	1/4 finals	-	-	-
2026–27	2nd (First League)	7_{/16}	10	4	3	3	12	11	15	1/16 finals	-	-	TBD

== Managers ==
- –2018 Dmytro Yesin
- 2018–2018 Artem Savin
- 2017–2020 Dmytro Yesin
- 2020–2021 Volodymyr Kilikevych
- 2021–2025 Oleh Krasnopyorov
- 2025–2026 Maksym Feshchuk (Feniks Pidmonastyr)
- 2026 Volodymyr Zhuravchak
- 2026– Bohdan Blavatskyi
