= FC Mynai =

Ukrainian football club

Mynai
- Full name: FC Mynai
- Nickname: The Wolf
- Founded: 2015; 11 years ago
- Dissolved: 2025; 1 year ago
- Ground: Avanhard Stadium, Uzhhorod; Mynai Arena, Mynai
- Capacity: 12,000
- Owner: Valeriy Peresolyak (president)
- Head coach: vacant
- League: Ukrainian First League
- 2024–25: 12th
- Website: fcminaj.com
Home colours	Away colours

FC Mynai (Ukrainian: Футбольний клуб Минай) is a Ukrainian professional football club from Mynai, a suburb of Uzhhorod in Zakarpattia Oblast. In July 2025 the club announced it had withdrawn from playing professional football for the time being while claiming "we will do everything in our power to return."

== History ==
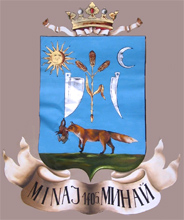
The Coat of Arms of Mynai features a fox which is also the club's symbol

The club was founded in 2015 by former customs officials in one of the Uzhhorod suburbs Mynai and played at the city and since 2016 – at the regional level.

The club was admitted to the Professional Football League of Ukraine after passing attestation for the 2018–19 Ukrainian Second League season. In their first professional season, Mynai managed to win Group A of the Second League, which earned them promotion to the Ukrainian First League. However, they lost the Ukrainian Second League Championship Game to Group B winners FC Kremin Kremenchuk.

In the 2019-20 Ukrainian First League season, they finished first, earning them promotion to the Ukrainian Premier League. Since the start of the 2020–21 season they play their home matches in the Avanhard Stadium in Uzhhorod. They continued to play in the Ukrainian Premier League, despite finishing last in the 2020–2021 season. Instead Olimpik Donetsk (they had finished 13th in the Premier League) were relegated back to the Persha Liha (Second Ukrainian League). In the 2023–24 season the club did relegate after four seasons in the top flight (finishing second to last). In July 2024 FC Mynai was extremely close to returning straight away to the Ukrainian Premier League. The club took part in a Mini-Tournament play-offs that was created for an open spot in the competition due to the disappearing of SC Dnipro-1. It made it to the final of this tournament, but lost to FC Livyi Bereh Kyiv.

On 22 July 2025 the club announced that it had withdrawn from the 2025–26 Ukrainian First League and was "forced to interrupt our history." The club stated it was intending to return to professional football claiming "we will do everything in our power to return."

== Current squad ==
As of 11 September 2025

Note: Flags indicate national team as defined under FIFA eligibility rules; some limited exceptions apply. Players may hold more than one non-FIFA nationality.

No.	Pos.	Nation	Player

=== Other players under contract ===
Note: Flags indicate national team as defined under FIFA eligibility rules; some limited exceptions apply. Players may hold more than one non-FIFA nationality.

No.	Pos.	Nation	Player

=== Out on loan ===
Note: Flags indicate national team as defined under FIFA eligibility rules; some limited exceptions apply. Players may hold more than one non-FIFA nationality.

No.	Pos.	Nation	Player

== Notable players ==
Had international caps for their respective countries. Players whose name is listed in bold represented their countries while playing for Mynai.

Ukraine

- (Ukraine) Oleh Dopilka
- (Ukraine) Vasyl Kobin
- (Ukraine) Yuriy Kolomoyets
- (Ukraine) Denys Kozhanov
- (Ukraine) Artem Milevskyi
- (Ukraine) Serhiy Myakushko
- (Ukraine) Ihor Oshchypko
- (Ukraine) Yevhen Seleznyov
- (Ukraine) Anton Shynder

Europe

- (Azerbaijan) **Rustam Akhmedzade**
- (Azerbaijan) **Anatoliy Nuriyev**
- (Azerbaijan) Andriy Popovych
- (Moldova) Mihail Ghecev

Africa

- (Mali) **Siaka Bagayoko**
- (South Africa) Tercious Malepe
- (Zambia) Shemmy Mayembe

== Honours ==
- Ukrainian First League
  - Winners (1): 2019–20
- Ukrainian Second League
  - Winners of group A (1): 2019
- Ukrainian Football Amateur League
  - Winners of group 1 (1): 2018
- Zakarpattia Oblast championship
  - Winners (1): 2017
  - 3rd place (1): 2016
- Zakarpattia Cup
  - Winners (2): 2017, 2018
- Zakarpattia Supercup
  - Winners (1): 2017

== League and cup history ==
Season	Div.	Pos.	Pl.	W	D	L	GS	GA	P	Domestic Cup	Other		Notes
2017–18	4th	**1**/9	16	11	4	1	34	9	37		PL	QF	Admitted
2018–19	3rd	**1**/10	27	15	4	8	41	26	49	1/8 finals			Promoted
2019–20	2nd	**1**/16	30	19	5	6	51	27	62	1/2 finals			Promoted
2020–21	1st	**14**/14	26	4	6	16	16	47	18	1/8 finals			Readmitted
2021–22	1st	**15**/16	18	1	7	10	12	30	10	1/16 finals			Avoided relegation
2022–23	1st	**8**/16	30	9	9	12	25	30	36	—			
2023–24	1st	**15** /16	30	5	10	15	27	50	25	1/8 finals			
2024–25	2nd	**12** /18	24	8	6	10	26	30	30	1/16 finals			Withdrew

== List of coaches ==
- 2015: Viacheslav Pinkovskyi
- 2016: Mykola Hibaliuk
- 2016: Mykhailo Ivanytsia
- 2017: Mykola Hibaliuk
- 2018–2019: Ihor Kharkovshchenko
- 2019: Kirill Kurenko
- 2019–2021: Vasyl Kobin
- 2021: Mykola Tsymbal
- 2021: Vasyl Kobin
- 2021: Ihor Leonov
- 2022–2023: Volodymyr Sharan

== Staff ==
Administration	Coaching (senior team)	Coaching (U-21/U-19 team)
President – Valeriy Peresolyak; Vice-president – Yevhen Plavaiko; Sporting director – Mykhaylo Kopolovets; Administrator – Serhiy Rushchak; Head coach –; Assistant coach – Vadym Chernyshenko; Assistant coach – Ihor Luchkevych; Assistant coach – Oleksiy Antonovych; GK coach – Andriy Novak; Head coach U21 –; Head coach U19 – Oleksiy Polyanskyi
