= 2015–16 FC Dynamo Kyiv season =

Dynamo Kyiv
2015–16 season
- Chairman: Ihor Surkis
- Manager: Serhii Rebrov
- Stadium: Olimpiysky National Sports Complex
- Premier League: 1st
- Ukrainian Cup: Quarter-finals
- Champions League: Round of 16
- Ukrainian Super Cup: Runners-up
- Top goalscorer: League: Andriy Yarmolenko (13); All: Andriy Yarmolenko (19)
Home colours	Away colours	Third colours

The 2014–15 Dynamo Kyiv season was Dynamo's 25th Ukrainian Premier League season, and their second season under manager Serhii Rebrov. During the season, Dynamo competed in the Ukrainian Premier League, Ukrainian Cup and in the UEFA Champions League.

== Squad ==
As of 4 February 2016

Note: Flags indicate national team as defined under FIFA eligibility rules; some limited exceptions apply. Players may hold more than one non-FIFA nationality.

No.	Pos.	Nation	Player
1	GK	UKR	Oleksandr Shovkovskyi (captain)
2	DF	BRA	Danilo Silva
4	MF	POR	Miguel Veloso
5	DF	POR	Vitorino Antunes
6	DF	AUT	Aleksandar Dragović
7	MF	UKR	Oleksandr Yakovenko
8	MF	SRB	Radosav Petrović
9	MF	UKR	Mykola Morozyuk
10	FW	UKR	Andriy Yarmolenko (2nd vice-captain)
11	FW	BRA	Júnior Moraes
16	MF	UKR	Serhiy Sydorchuk
17	MF	UKR	Serhiy Rybalka
18	MF	BLR	Nikita Korzun
19	MF	UKR	Denys Harmash
20	MF	UKR	Oleh Husyev (1st vice-captain)

No.	Pos.	Nation	Player
22	DF	LAT	Vitālijs Jagodinskis
23	GK	UKR	Oleksandr Rybka
24	DF	CRO	Domagoj Vida
25	FW	PAR	Derlis González
26	DF	UKR	Mykyta Burda
27	DF	UKR	Yevhen Makarenko
29	MF	UKR	Vitaliy Buyalskyi
32	MF	UKR	Valeriy Fedorchuk
34	DF	UKR	Yevhen Khacheridi
45	MF	UKR	Vladyslav Kalytvyntsev
52	GK	UKR	Heorhiy Bushchan
72	GK	UKR	Artur Rudko
88	MF	UKR	Serhiy Myakushko
91	FW	POL	Łukasz Teodorczyk

=== Out on loan ===
Note: Flags indicate national team as defined under FIFA eligibility rules; some limited exceptions apply. Players may hold more than one non-FIFA nationality.

No.	Pos.	Nation	Player
—	GK	UKR	Maksym Koval (at OB)
—	GK	UKR	Oleksiy Shevchenko (at Dila Gori)
—	GK	UKR	Myroslav Bon (at)
—	DF	UKR	Vyacheslav Lukhtanov (at Hoverla Uzhhorod)
—	DF	UKR	Pavlo Polehenko (at Hoverla Uzhhorod)
—	DF	UKR	Serhiy Lyulka (at Hoverla Uzhhorod)
—	DF	UKR	Dmytro Ryzhuk (at Metalist Kharkiv)
—	DF	UKR	Yevhen Selin (at Platanias)
—	MF	ARG	Facundo Bertoglio (at Asteras Tripolis)
—	MF	UKR	Yevhen Chumak (at Hoverla Uzhhorod)

No.	Pos.	Nation	Player
—	MF	UKR	Vitaliy Kaverin (at)
—	MF	UKR	Orest Kuzyk (at Hoverla Uzhhorod)
—	MF	UKR	Vitaliy Hemeha (at Hoverla Uzhhorod)
—	MF	UKR	Oleksiy Savchenko (at Hoverla Uzhhorod)
—	MF	NGR	Lukman Haruna (at Anzhi Makhachkala)
—	MF	UKR	Andriy Tsurikov (at Hoverla Uzhhorod)
—	FW	COL	Andrés Escobar (at Atlético Nacional)
—	FW	UKR	Dmytro Khlyobas (at Hoverla Uzhhorod)
—	FW	UKR	Oleksiy Khoblenko (at Hoverla Uzhhorod)
—	FW	UKR	Artem Besyedin (at Metalist Kharkiv)
—	FW	ARG	Marco Ruben (at Rosario Central)
—	FW	COD	Dieumerci Mbokani (at Norwich City)

=== Retired number(s) ===
12 – (Ukraine) Club Supporters (the 12th Man)

== Transfers ==
=== Summer ===
In: Note: Flags indicate national team as defined under FIFA eligibility rules; some limited exceptions apply. Players may hold more than one non-FIFA nationality.

No.	Pos.	Nation	Player
8	MF	SRB	Radosav Petrović (from (Turkey) Gençlerbirliği)
9	MF	UKR	Mykola Morozyuk (from (Ukraine) Metalurh Donetsk)
11	FW	BRA	Júnior Moraes (from (Ukraine) Metalurh Donetsk)
25	FW	PAR	Derlis González (from (Switzerland) Basel)
35	GK	UKR	Maksym Koval (loan return from (Ukraine) Hoverla Uzhhorod)
88	MF	UKR	Serhiy Myakushko (loan return from (Ukraine) Hoverla Uzhhorod)

Out: Note: Flags indicate national team as defined under FIFA eligibility rules; some limited exceptions apply. Players may hold more than one non-FIFA nationality.

No.	Pos.	Nation	Player
7	FW	NED	Jeremain Lens (to (England) Sunderland)
28	DF	UKR	Yevhen Chumak (loan to (Ukraine) Hoverla Uzhhorod)
30	DF	BRA	Betão (to (France) Evian)
35	GK	UKR	Maksym Koval (loan to (Denmark) OB)
45	MF	UKR	Vladyslav Kalytvyntsev (loan to (Ukraine) Chornomorets Odesa)
72	GK	UKR	Artur Rudko (loan to (Ukraine) Hoverla Uzhhorod)
85	FW	COD	Dieumerci Mbokani (loan to (England) Norwich City)
—	MF	NGR	Lukman Haruna (loan to (Russia) Anzhi Makhachkala)

=== Winter ===
In: Note: Flags indicate national team as defined under FIFA eligibility rules; some limited exceptions apply. Players may hold more than one non-FIFA nationality.

No.	Pos.	Nation	Player
7	MF	UKR	Oleksandr Yakovenko (from (Italy) Fiorentina)
18	MF	BLR	Nikita Korzun (from (Belarus) Dinamo Minsk)
22	DF	LAT	Vitālijs Jagodinskis (loan return from (Ukraine) Hoverla Uzhhorod)
32	MF	UKR	Valeriy Fedorchuk (from (Ukraine) Dnipro Dnipropetrovsk)
72	GK	UKR	Artur Rudko (loan return from (Ukraine) Hoverla Uzhhorod)

Out: Note: Flags indicate national team as defined under FIFA eligibility rules; some limited exceptions apply. Players may hold more than one non-FIFA nationality.

No.	Pos.	Nation	Player
21	MF	CRO	Niko Kranjčar (to (United States) New York Cosmos)
22	FW	UKR	Artem Kravets (loan to (Germany) VfB Stuttgart)
90	MF	MAR	Younès Belhanda (loan to (Germany) Schalke 04)

== Competitions ==
=== Ukrainian Super Cup ===
14 July 2015	Dynamo Kyiv	0–2	Shakhtar Donetsk	Odesa
21:00 EEST (UTC+3)	Sydorchuk (yellow card) 27'; Dragović (yellow card) 53'; Silva (yellow card) 55'; Rybalka (yellow card) 56' (yellow-red card) 90+6'; Vida (yellow card) 73'; Shovkovskyi (red card) 90'; Kravets (yellow card) 90+3'	Summary	Fred (yellow card) 69'; Teixeira (yellow card) 86'; Srna 90+2', (yellow card) 90+2'; Bernard 90+4'	Stadium: Chornomorets Stadium; Attendance: 34,164; Referee: Anatoliy Zhabchenko

=== Ukrainian Premier League ===
==== League table ====
Pos	Team	Pld	W	D	L	GF	GA	GD	Pts	Qualification or relegation
1	Dynamo Kyiv (C)	26	23	1	2	54	11	+43	70	Qualification to Champions League group stage
2	Shakhtar Donetsk	26	20	3	3	76	25	+51	63	Qualification to Champions League third qualifying round (Note: Shakhtar Donetsk qualified for the Europa League group stage by winning the 2015–16 Ukrainian Cup. However, since they already qualified for European competition based on their league position, the spot awarded to the cup winners was passed down the league.)
3	Dnipro Dnipropetrovsk (Note: On 31 March 2016, the Adjudicatory Chamber of the UEFA Club Financial Control Body (CFCB) announced that Dnipro Dnipropetrovsk will be excluded from participating in the next UEFA club competition for which they would otherwise qualify in the next three (3) seasons (i.e. the 2016–17, 2017–18 and 2018–19 seasons).)	26	16	5	5	50	22	+28	53	
4	Zorya Luhansk	26	14	6	6	51	26	+25	48	Qualification to Europa League group stage
5	Vorskla Poltava	26	11	9	6	32	26	+6	42	Qualification to Europa League third qualifying round

Source: uafootball.net.ua
Rules for classification: 1) Points; 2) Goal difference; 3) Goals scored; 4) Head-to-head points; 5) Head-to-head goal difference; 6) Head-to-head goals scored; 7) Fairplay ranking; 8) Draw.
(C) Champions

==== Results summary ====
Overall								Home						Away					
Pld	W	D	L	GF	GA	GD	Pts	W	D	L	GF	GA	GD	W	D	L	GF	GA	GD
26	22	2	2	55	11	+44	68	12	1	1	26	4	+22	10	1	1	29	7	+22

==== Results by round ====
Round	1	2	3	4	5	6	7	8	9	10	11	12	13	14	15	16	17	18	19	20	21	22	23	24	25	26
Ground	A	H	A	A	H	A	H	A	H	A	H	H	H	A	H	A	H	A	H	A	H	A	H	A	H	A
Result	W	W	W	W	W	D	W	W	W	W	L	W	W	W	W	W	W	W	W	W	W	W	W	L	W	W
Position	4	2	2	1	1	1	1	1	1	1	2	2	2	2	2	2	1	1	1	1	1	1	1	1	1	1

Updated to match(es) played on 14 May 2016. Source: Socceraway
A = Away; H = Home; W = Win; D = Draw; L = Loss

==== Results ====
19 July 2015 1	Stal Dniprodzerzhynsk	1–2	Dynamo Kyiv	Dniprodzerzhynsk
19:30 EEST (UTC+3)	Veloso 4' (o.g.); Voronin (yellow card) 52'; Ischenko (yellow card) 52' (red card) 52'	Summary	Buyalskyi 44', (yellow card) 58'; Husyev 53' (pen.); Silva (red card) 60'; Belhanda (yellow card) 72'; Yarmolenko (yellow card) 88'	Stadium: Metalurh Stadium; Attendance: 4,700; Referee: Yury Grisjo

25 July 2015 2	Dynamo Kyiv	2–0	Olimpik Donetsk	Kyiv
19:30 EEST (UTC+3)	Yarmolenko 12'; Dragović (yellow card) 18' (yellow-red card) 64'; Veloso (yellow card) 43'; Khacheridi (yellow card) 48' (yellow-red card) 51'; Moraes 61'; Rybalka (yellow card) 90+5'	Summary	Tanchyk (yellow card) 34' (yellow-red card) 87'; Hoshkoderya (yellow card) 40'; Tyschenko (yellow card) 50'; Drachenko (yellow card) 57'	Stadium: NSC Olimpiyskiy Stadium; Attendance: 9,130; Referee: Vitaliy Romanov

2 August 2015 3	Chornomorets Odesa	0–2	Dynamo Kyiv	Odesa
19:30 EEST (UTC+3)	Khocholava (yellow card) 39'; Nyemchaninov (yellow card) 45'; Fylymonov (yellow card) 49'; Nasimi (yellow card) 87'	Summary	Veloso (yellow card) 44'; Morozyuk (yellow card) 46'; Moraes 89'; Antunes (yellow card) 90+1'; Yarmolenko 90+3'	Stadium: Chornomorets Stadium; Attendance: 22,222; Referee: Yuriy Moseychuk

9 August 2015 4	Dnipro Dnipropetrovsk	1–2	Dynamo Kyiv	Dnipropetrovsk
19:30 EEST (UTC+3)	Seleznyov (yellow card) 2'; Matos (yellow card) 22'; Fedorchuk 50'	Summary	Harmash (yellow card) 22'; Douglas 25' (o.g.); Veloso 40', (yellow card) 86'	Stadium: Dnipro-Arena; Attendance: 22,060; Referee: Yuriy Mozharovsky

15 August 2015 5	Dynamo Kyiv	3–0	Karpaty Lviv	Kyiv
19:30 EEST (UTC+3)	Veloso 22', (yellow card) 90'; Moraes (yellow card) 23', (goal) 72'; Yarmolenko 53'	Summary		Stadium: NSC Olimpiyskiy Stadium; Attendance: 17,476; Referee: Vury Vaks

28 August 2015 6	Zorya Luhansk	0–0	Dynamo Kyiv	Luhansk
EEST (UTC+3)	Pylyavskyi (yellow card) 10'; Sivakow (yellow card) 54'; Hordiyenko (yellow card) 81'; Shevchenko (yellow card) 88'; Lipartia (yellow card) 90+4'	Summary	Belhanda (yellow card) 30'; Silva (yellow card) 52'; Rybalka (yellow card) 56'; Antunes (yellow card) 74'; Khacheridi (yellow card) 90'	Stadium: Avanhard Stadium; Attendance: 6,800; Referee: Kostyantin Trukhanov

12 September 2015 7	Dynamo Kyiv	3–0	Oleksandriya	Kyiv
17:00 EEST (UTC+3)	Harmash 33'; Vida 38'; González (yellow card) 57'; Silva (yellow card) 71', (goal) 90+4'; Belhanda (yellow card) 82'	Summary	Y. Kolomoyets (yellow card) 56'; Banada (yellow card) 82'	Stadium: NSC Olimpiyskiy Stadium; Attendance: 10,843; Referee: Olexander Derdo

20 September 2015 8	Volyn Lutsk	0–2	Dynamo Kyiv	Lutsk
17:00 EEST (UTC+3)	Shish (yellow card) 53'; Sharpar (yellow card) 56'; Kravchenko (yellow card) 61'	Summary	Kravets 43'; Husyev 62' (pen.); Sydorchuk (yellow card) 76'; Silva (yellow card) 86'	Stadium: Avanhard Stadium; Attendance: 10,280; Referee: Anatoliy Abdula

27 September 2015 9	Dynamo Kyiv	2–0	Hoverla Uzhhorod	Kyiv
19:30 EEST (UTC+3)	Kravets 33'; Husyev 60'; Khacheridi (yellow card) 64'	Summary		Stadium: NSC Olimpiyskiy Stadium; Attendance: 10,618; Referee: Kostyantin Trukhanov

4 October 2015 10	Vorskla Poltava	0–4	Dynamo Kyiv	Poltava
19:30 EEST (UTC+3)	Tkachuk (yellow card) 31'; Shynder (yellow card) 57'	Summary	Buyalskyi 18'; Antunes 33'; González 67'; Yarmolenko 71'	Stadium: Oleksiy Butovskyi Vorskla Stadium; Referee: Yury Vaks

16 October 2015 11	Dynamo Kyiv	0–3	Shakhtar Donetsk	Kyiv
19:00 EEST (UTC+3)	González (yellow card) 57' (yellow-red card) 89'; Silva (yellow card) 78'; Belhanda (yellow card) 79'; Sydorchuk (yellow card) 90+1'	Summary	Teixeira (yellow card) 3', (goal) 59', 67'; Marlos 40'	Stadium: NSC Olimpiyskiy Stadium; Attendance: 32,794; Referee: Anatoliy Abdula

31 October 2015 12	Dynamo Kyiv	2–0	Metalist Kharkiv	Kyiv
17:00 EET (UTC+2)	Sydorchuk 34'; Moraes 74'	Summary	Lyopa (yellow card) 60'; Rudyka (yellow card) 65'; Zubeyko (yellow card) 88'	Stadium: NSC Olimpiyskiy Stadium; Attendance: 10,976; Referee: Oleksandr Golovkov

8 November 2015 13	Dynamo Kyiv	2–0	Stal Dniprodzerzhynsk	Kyiv
19:30 EET (UTC+2)	Khacheridi (yellow card) 79'; Yarmolenko 88', 90+4'; Dragović (yellow card) 88'	Summary	Voronin (yellow card) 82'; Pankiv (yellow card) 86'	Stadium: NSC Olimpiyskiy Stadium; Attendance: 7,644; Referee: Olexander Derdo

20 November 2015 14	Olimpik Donetsk	0–3	Dynamo Kyiv	Kyiv
19:00 EET (UTC+2)	Hryshko (yellow card) 32'; Hoshkoderya (yellow card) 51'; Tanchyk (yellow card) 90+2'	Summary	Moraes 25'; Veloso (yellow card) 29'; Harmash 45+1'; Husyev 70' (pen.); Belhanda (yellow card) 90+2'	Stadium: Bannikov Stadium; Attendance: 2,500; Referee: Kostyantin Trukhanov

29 November 2015 15	Dynamo Kyiv	2–1	Chornomorets Odesa	Kyiv
17:00 EET (UTC+2)	González 43'; Yarmolenko 47' (pen.); Dragović (yellow card) 67'	Summary	Martynenko (yellow card) 35'; Gadrani (yellow card) 46' (yellow-red card) 90+2'; Petko (yellow card) 46'; Filimonov (yellow card) 48'; Kovalets 87'	Stadium: NSC Olimpiyskiy Stadium; Referee: Yury Vaks

4 December 2015 16	Metalurh Zaporizhya	0–6	Dynamo Kyiv	Zaporizhia
19:00 EET (UTC+2)	Demchenko (yellow card) 20'; Kornyev (yellow card) 45'; Haponchuk (yellow card) 79'	Summary	Yarmolenko 8'; Petrović 22', (yellow card) 56'; Harmash 47'; Teodorczyk 61'; Husyev 86' (pen.), 90+1'	Stadium: Slavutych-Arena; Attendance: 4,800; Referee: Oleksandr Ivanov

5 March 2016 17	Dynamo Kyiv	2–0	Dnipro Dnipropetrovsk	Kyiv
17:00 EET (UTC+2)	Yarmolenko 19'; Husyev 38'; Buyalskyi (yellow card) 63'; Sydorchuk (yellow card) 87'	Summary	Matos (yellow card) 22'; Rotan (yellow card) 35'; Zozulya (yellow card) 42'; Fedetskyi (yellow card) 59'; Ruiz (yellow card) 90'	Stadium: NSC Olimpiyskiy Stadium; Attendance: 14,096; Referee: Anatoliy Zhabchenko

11 March 2016 18	Karpaty Lviv	1–2	Dynamo Kyiv	Lviv
20:00 EET (UTC+2)	Chachua 28', (yellow card) 40'; Kadymyan (yellow card) 90+2'	Summary	Yarmolenko (yellow card) 16', (goal) 64'; Vida (yellow card) 45+3'; Teodorczyk 55'	Stadium: Ukraina Stadium; Attendance: 14,656; Referee: Kostyantin Trukhanov

20 March 2016 19	Dynamo Kyiv	1–0	Zorya Luhansk	Kyiv
19:30 EET (UTC+2)	Harmash (yellow card) 32'; Moraes 76'; Sydorchuk (yellow card) 90+2'	Summary	Hordiyenko (yellow card) 12'; Tankovskyi (yellow card) 51'; Checher (yellow card) 78'; Karavayev (yellow card) 81'; Petryak (yellow card) 87'; Kamenyuka (yellow card) 90'	Stadium: NSC Olimpiyskiy Stadium; Attendance: 6,919; Referee: Yuriy Mozharovsky

2 April 2016 20	Oleksandriya	0–2	Dynamo Kyiv	Oleksandriia
19:30 EET (UTC+2)	Putrash (yellow card) 24'; Shendrik (yellow card) 55'	Summary	Veloso (yellow card) 11'; Vida 15'; Husyev 44'; Khacheridi (yellow card) 70'	Stadium: CSC Nika Stadium; Attendance: 7,000; Referee: Anatoliy Abdula

10 April 2016 21	Dynamo Kyiv	3–0	Volyn Lutsk	Kyiv
19:30 EET (UTC+2)	Yarmolenko 29', 36'; Husyev 33'	Summary	Shabanov (yellow card) 26' (yellow-red card) 45'; Nykytyuk (yellow card) 42'; Kravchenko (yellow card) 55'; Humenyuk (yellow card) 72'	Stadium: NSC Olimpiyskiy Stadium; Attendance: 8,079; Referee: Yury Grisjo

16 April 2016 22	Hoverla Uzhhorod	0–2	Dynamo Kyiv	Uzhhorod
17:00 EET (UTC+2)	Havrysh (yellow card) 64'; Khudobyak (yellow card) 74'; Khomenko (yellow card) 90+3'	Summary	Moraes (yellow card) 22'; Yarmolenko 48'; Silva (yellow card) 62'; Khacheridi 78'	Stadium: Avanhard Stadium; Attendance: 6,800; Referee: Igor Paskhal

24 April 2016 23	Dynamo Kyiv	1–0	Vorskla	Kyiv
19:30 EET (UTC+2)	Moraes 36', (yellow card) 90'; Rybalka (yellow card) 86'; Yarmolenko (yellow card) 90'	Summary	Shynder (yellow card) 66'; Dytyatev (yellow card) 90'	Stadium: NSC Olimpiyskiy Stadium; Attendance: 20,621; Referee: (Ukraine) Anatoliy Abdula

1 May 2016 24	Shakhtar Donetsk	3–0	Dynamo Kyiv	Lviv
19:30 EET (UTC+2)	Eduardo 33', 78', (yellow card) 69'; Stepanenko (yellow card) 50' (yellow-red card) 80'; Ordets (yellow card) 58'; Kobin (yellow card) 69'; Wellington Nem 73'; Kucher (red card) 80'; Lucescu (red card) 81'	Summary	Harmash (yellow card) 40'; Yarmolenko (yellow card) 42' (red card) 80'; Khacheridi (yellow card) 45+1'; Vida (yellow card) 80'; Rybalka (yellow card) 80'	Stadium: Arena Lviv; Attendance: 6,497; Referee: (Ukraine) Yuriy Mozharovsky

6 May 2016 25	Dynamo Kyiv	3–0	Metalurh Zaporizhya	Kyiv
		Summary		Stadium: NSC Olimpiyskiy Stadium

14 May 2016 26	Metalist Kharkiv	1–4	Dynamo Kyiv	Kharkiv
19:3 EET (UTC+2)	Napolov 90+3'	Summary	Teodorczyk 7', 8', 67'; Husyev 90+4'	Stadium: OSC Metalist; Attendance: 8,814; Referee: (Ukraine) Anatoliy Zhabchenko

=== Ukrainian Cup ===
22 August 2015 Round of 32	Hirnyk-Sport Komsomolsk	0–6	Dynamo Kyiv	Komsomolsk
17:00 EEST (UTC+3)	Klischuk (yellow card) 10'	Summary	Kravets 26'; Yarmolenko 39', 65', 76'; Khacheridi (yellow card) 50'; Veloso 56'; Antunes 67'; Sydorchuk (yellow card) 70'	Stadium: Yunist Stadium; Attendance: 3,000; Referee: Andrew Yablonskyi

23 September 2015 Round of 16 1st leg	Obolon-Brovar Kyiv	0–2	Dynamo Kyiv	Kyiv
19:30 EEST (UTC+3)	Mandzyuk (yellow card) 84'; Ablitarov (yellow card) 87'	Summary	K. Kovalenko 27' (o.g.); Moraes 73'	Stadium: Obolon Arena; Attendance: 5,100; Referee: Sergiy Skrypak

27 October 2015 Round of 16 2nd leg	Dynamo Kyiv	5–0 (7–0 agg.)	Obolon-Brovar Kyiv	Kyiv
19:00 EET (UTC+2)	Harmash 5', 32'; Husyev 66', 69'; Teodorczyk 80'	Summary	Prodan (yellow card) 19' (yellow-red card) 61'; Favorov (yellow card) 68'	Stadium: NSC Olimpiyskiy Stadium; Attendance: 6,758; Referee: Mykola Balakin

1 March 2016 Quarterfinal 1st leg	Oleksandriya	1–1	Dynamo Kyiv	Kyiv
19:00 EET (UTC+2)	Basov 30'; Chorniy (yellow card) 88'	Summary	González (yellow card) 59'; Yarmolenko 67'; Khacheridi (yellow card) 87'	Stadium: NSC Olimpiyskiy Stadium; Attendance: 3,554; Referee: Yuri Mozharovskiy

6 April 2016 Quarterfinal 2nd leg	Dynamo Kyiv	0–1 (1–2 agg.)	Oleksandriya	Kyiv
17:00 EET (UTC+2)	Rybalka (yellow card) 6' (yellow-red card) 53'; Vida (yellow card) 65'	Summary	Chorniy 25', (yellow card) 45'; Chebotayev (yellow card) 31'; Basov (yellow card) 90+4'; Shendrik (yellow card) 90+5'	Stadium: NSC Olimpiyskiy Stadium; Attendance: 6,800; Referee: Olexander Derdo

=== Champions League ===
==== Group stage ====
Pos	Team	Pld	W	D	L	GF	GA	GD	Pts	Qualification
1	(England) Chelsea	6	4	1	1	13	3	+10	13	Advance to knockout phase
2	(Ukraine) Dynamo Kyiv	6	3	2	1	8	4	+4	11	Advance to knockout phase
3	(Portugal) Porto	6	3	1	2	9	8	+1	10	Transfer to Europa League
4	(Israel) Maccabi Tel Aviv	6	0	0	6	1	16	−15	0	

Source: UEFA
Rules for classification: Group stage tiebreakers

16 September 2015 1	Dynamo Kyiv (Ukraine)	2–2	(Portugal) Porto	Kyiv, Ukraine
21:45 EEST (UTC+3)	Husyev 20' (yellow card) 46'; Rybalka (yellow card) 58'; Buyalskyi 89'	Report	Maicon (yellow card) 17'; Aboubakar 23', 81', (yellow card) 48'; M. Pereira (yellow card) 40'; D. Pereira (yellow card) 88'	Stadium: NSC Olimpiyskiy Stadium; Attendance: 52,369; Referee: Felix Brych (Germany)

29 September 2015 2	Maccabi Tel Aviv (Israel)	0–2	(Ukraine) Dynamo Kyiv	Haifa, Israel
21:45 EEST (UTC+3)	Basat (yellow card) 20'; Rikan (yellow card) 47'; Ben Haim I (yellow card) 75'	Report	Yarmolenko 4'; Veloso (yellow card) 36'; Moraes 50'; Khacheridi (yellow card) 64'; Antunes (yellow card) 80'	Stadium: Sammy Ofer Stadium; Attendance: 27,100; Referee: David Fernández Borbalán (Spain)

20 October 2015 3	Dynamo Kyiv (Ukraine)	0–0	(England) Chelsea	Kyiv, Ukraine
21:45 EEST (UTC+3)	Buyalskyi (yellow card) 65'	Report	Zouma (yellow card) 67'	Stadium: NSC Olimpiyskiy Stadium; Attendance: 60,291; Referee: Damir Skomina (Slovenia)

4 November 2015 4	Chelsea (England)	2–1	(Ukraine) Dynamo Kyiv	London, England
21:45 EET (UTC+2)	Dragović 34' (o.g.); Willian 83'	Report	González (yellow card) 26'; Antunes (yellow card) 59'; Buyalskyi (yellow card) 72'; Dragović 78', (yellow card) 90'	Stadium: Stamford Bridge; Attendance: 41,241; Referee: Pavel Královec (Czech Republic)

24 November 2015 5	Porto (Portugal)	0–2	(Ukraine) Dynamo Kyiv	Porto, Portugal
21:45 EET (UTC+2)		Report	Yarmolenko 35' (pen.); Silva (yellow card) 36'; Harmash (yellow card) 38'; Sydorchuk (yellow card) 68'; González 64'	Stadium: Estádio do Dragão; Attendance: 31,220; Referee: Carlos Velasco Carballo (Spain)

9 December 2015 6	Dynamo Kyiv (Ukraine)	1–0	(Israel) Maccabi Tel Aviv	Kyiv, Ukraine
21:45 EET (UTC+2)	Harmash 16'; Antunes (yellow card) 31'; Silva (yellow card) 40'; Rybalka (yellow card) 45+1'	Report	Igiebor (yellow card) 42'; Tibi (yellow card) 81'; Yitzhaki (yellow card) 87'	Stadium: NSC Olimpiyskiy Stadium; Attendance: 475; Referee: Björn Kuipers (Netherlands)

==== Knockout stage ====
24 February 2016 Round of 16 1st leg	Dynamo Kyiv (Ukraine)	1–3	(England) Manchester City	Kyiv, Ukraine
21:45 EET (UTC+2)	Buyalskyi 59'	Report	Agüero 15'; Silva 40'; Touré 90'	Stadium: NSC Olimpiyskiy Stadium; Attendance: 53,691; Referee: Antonio Mateu Lahoz (Spain)

15 March 2016 Round of 16 2nd leg	Manchester City (England)	0–0 (3–1 agg.)	(Ukraine) Dynamo Kyiv	Manchester
21:45 EET (UTC+2)	Otamendi (yellow card) 18'	Report	Antunes (yellow card) 21'; Harmash (yellow card) 57'	Stadium: City of Manchester Stadium; Attendance: 43,630; Referee: Ovidiu Hațegan (Romania)

== Squad statistics ==
As of match played 16 April 2016

=== Appearances and goals ===
No.	Pos	Nat	Player	Total		Premier League		Ukrainian Cup		Champions League		Supercup	
No.	Pos	Nat	Player	Apps	Goals	Apps	Goals	Apps	Goals	Apps	Goals	Apps	Goals
1	GK	(Ukraine) UKR	Oleksandr Shovkovskyi	24	0	16	0	0	0	7	0	1	0
2	DF	(Brazil) BRA	Danilo Silva	24	1	15	1	2	0	6	0	1	0
4	MF	(Portugal) POR	Miguel Veloso	27	2	17+1	2	3	0	3+2	0	1	0
5	DF	(Portugal) POR	Vitorino Antunes	31	2	20	1	3+1	1	6	0	1	0
6	DF	(Austria) AUT	Aleksandar Dragović	30	1	17	0	4	0	8	1	1	0
7	MF	(Ukraine) UKR	Oleksandr Yakovenko	5	0	0+3	0	1	0	0+1	0	0	0
8	MF	(Serbia) SRB	Radosav Petrović	11	1	5+1	1	5	0	0	0	0	0
9	MF	(Ukraine) UKR	Mykola Morozyuk	10	0	3+3	0	3	0	0	0	1	0
10	FW	(Ukraine) UKR	Andriy Yarmolenko	33	19	21	13	2+2	4	7	2	1	0
11	FW	(Brazil) BRA	Júnior Moraes	27	8	16+1	6	2	1	4+3	1	1	0
16	MF	(Ukraine) UKR	Serhiy Sydorchuk	26	1	9+7	1	1+2	0	5+1	0	1	0
17	MF	(Ukraine) UKR	Serhiy Rybalka	24	0	15	0	1	0	7	0	1	0
19	MF	(Ukraine) UKR	Denys Harmash	27	6	11+5	3	2+1	2	5+2	1	0+1	0
20	MF	(Ukraine) UKR	Oleh Husyev	27	12	16+5	9	1+1	2	2+1	1	0+1	0
21	FW	(Ukraine) UKR	Artem Besyedin	1	0	0+1	0	0	0	0	0	0	0
23	GK	(Ukraine) UKR	Oleksandr Rybka	11	0	6	0	4	0	1	0	0	0
24	DF	(Croatia) CRO	Domagoj Vida	25	2	16	2	3	0	4+1	0	1	0
25	FW	(Paraguay) PAR	Derlis González	24	3	5+7	2	3+1	0	7+1	1	0	0
26	DF	(Ukraine) UKR	Mykyta Burda	2	0	0	0	1+1	0	0	0	0	0
27	DF	(Ukraine) UKR	Yevhen Makarenko	6	0	2	0	2+1	0	0+1	0	0	0
29	MF	(Ukraine) UKR	Vitaliy Buyalskyi	25	4	8+7	2	3	0	4+3	2	0	0
34	DF	(Ukraine) UKR	Yevhen Khacheridi	22	1	12	1	2	0	8	0	0	0
48	MF	(Ukraine) UKR	Pavlo Orikhovskyy	1	0	0+1	0	0	0	0	0	0	0
72	GK	(Ukraine) UKR	Artur Rudko	1	0	0	0	1	0	0	0	0	0
88	MF	(Ukraine) UKR	Serhiy Myakushko	5	0	0+3	0	1+1	0	0	0	0	0
91	FW	(Poland) POL	Łukasz Teodorczyk	17	3	3+7	2	1+2	1	2+2	0	0	0
	FW	(Ukraine) UKR	Roman Yaremchuk	1	0	0	0	1	0	0	0	0	0
Players who left Dynamo Kyiv on loan during the season :
22	FW	(Ukraine) UKR	Artem Kravets	18	3	4+8	2	1	1	2+2	0	0+1	0
90	MF	(Morocco) MAR	Younès Belhanda	14	0	5+5	0	1+1	0	0+2	0	0	0
Players who left Dynamo Kyiv during the season :
21	MF	(Croatia) CRO	Niko Kranjčar	1	0	0	0	0+1	0	0	0	0	0

=== Goalscorers ===
Place	Position	Nation	Number	Name	Premier League	Ukrainian Cup	Champions League	Ukrainian Super Cup	Total
1	FW	(Ukraine)	10	Andriy Yarmolenko	13	4	2	0	19
2	MF	(Ukraine)	20	Oleh Husyev	9	2	1	0	12
3	FW	(Brazil)	11	Júnior Moraes	6	1	1	0	8
4	MF	(Ukraine)	19	Denys Harmash	3	2	1	0	6
5	MF	(Ukraine)	29	Vitaliy Buyalskyi	2	0	2	0	4
6	MF	(Portugal)	4	Miguel Veloso	2	1	0	0	3
6	FW	(Ukraine)	22	Artem Kravets	2	1	0	0	3
6	FW	(Paraguay)	25	Derlis González	2	0	1	0	3
6	FW	(Poland)	91	Łukasz Teodorczyk	2	1	0	0	3
10	DF	(Croatia)	24	Domagoj Vida	2	0	0	0	2
10	DF	(Portugal)	5	Vitorino Antunes	1	1	0	0	2
			Own goal	1	1	0	0	2	
13	DF	(Brazil)	2	Danilo Silva	1	0	0	0	1
13	MF	(Ukraine)	16	Serhiy Sydorchuk	1	0	0	0	1
13	MF	(Serbia)	8	Radosav Petrović	1	0	0	0	1
13	DF	(Ukraine)	34	Yevhen Khacheridi	0	0	1	0	1
13	DF	(Austria)	6	Aleksandar Dragović	0	0	1	0	1
				TOTALS	49	14	9	0	72

=== Disciplinary record ===
Number	Nation	Position	Name	Premier League		Ukrainian Cup		Champions League		Ukrainian Super Cup		Total	
Number	Nation	Position	Name	Yellow card	Red card	Yellow card	Red card	Yellow card	Red card	Yellow card	Red card	Yellow card	Red card
1	(Ukraine)	GK	Oleksandr Shovkovskyi	0	0	0	0	0	0	0	1	0	1
2	(Brazil)	DF	Danilo Silva	5	1	0	0	2	0	1	0	8	1
4	(Portugal)	MF	Miguel Veloso	6	0	0	0	1	0	0	0	7	0
5	(Portugal)	DF	Vitorino Antunes	2	0	0	0	4	0	0	0	6	0
6	(Austria)	DF	Aleksandar Dragović	4	1	0	0	1	0	1	0	6	1
8	(Serbia)	MF	Radosav Petrović	1	0	0	0	0	0	0	0	1	0
9	(Ukraine)	MF	Mykola Morozyuk	1	0	0	0	0	0	0	0	1	0
10	(Ukraine)	FW	Andriy Yarmolenko	2	0	0	0	0	0	0	0	2	0
11	(Brazil)	FW	Júnior Moraes	2	0	0	0	0	0	0	0	2	0
16	(Ukraine)	MF	Serhiy Sydorchuk	4	0	1	0	1	0	1	0	7	0
17	(Ukraine)	MF	Serhiy Rybalka	2	0	2	1	2	0	2	1	8	2
19	(Ukraine)	MF	Denys Harmash	2	0	0	0	2	0	0	0	4	0
20	(Ukraine)	MF	Oleh Husyev	0	0	0	0	1	0	0	0	1	0
22	(Ukraine)	FW	Artem Kravets	0	0	0	0	0	0	1	0	1	0
24	(Croatia)	MF	Domagoj Vida	1	0	1	0	0	0	1	0	3	0
25	(Paraguay)	FW	Derlis González	3	1	1	0	1	0	0	0	5	1
29	(Ukraine)	MF	Vitaliy Buyalskyi	2	0	0	0	2	0	0	0	4	0
34	(Ukraine)	DF	Yevhen Khacheridi	6	1	2	0	1	0	0	0	9	1
90	(Morocco)	MF	Younès Belhanda	5	0	0	0	0	0	0	0	5	0
			TOTALS	49	4	2	0	20	1	7	1	78	6

== Notes ==
Notes

1. Shakhtar Donetsk play their home matches at Arena Lviv, Lviv instead of their regular stadium, Donbas Arena, Donetsk, due to the war conditions in Eastern Ukraine.
2. The Dynamo Kyiv v Maccabi Tel Aviv match was played behind closed doors due to punishment by UEFA.
