= 2014–15 FC Dynamo Kyiv season =

Dynamo Kyiv
2014–15 season
- Chairman: Ihor Surkis
- Manager: Serhii Rebrov
- Stadium: Olimpiysky National Sports Complex
- Premier League: 1st
- Ukrainian Cup: Winners
- Ukrainian Super Cup: Runners-up
- Europa League: Quarter-finals
- Top goalscorer: League: Artem Kravets (15); All: Artem Kravets (19)
Home colours	Away colours	Third colours

The 2014–15 Dynamo season was the club's 24th Ukrainian Premier League season, and their first season under manager Serhii Rebrov. During the season, Dynamo competed in the Ukrainian Premier League, Ukrainian Cup and UEFA Europa League.

== Squad ==
As of 9 March 2015

Note: Flags indicate national team as defined under FIFA eligibility rules; some limited exceptions apply. Players may hold more than one non-FIFA nationality.

No.	Pos.	Nation	Player
1	GK	UKR	Oleksandr Shovkovskyi (captain)
2	DF	BRA	Danilo Silva
4	MF	POR	Miguel Veloso
5	DF	POR	Vitorino Antunes
6	DF	AUT	Aleksandar Dragović
7	FW	NED	Jeremain Lens
10	FW	UKR	Andriy Yarmolenko (vice-captain)
16	MF	UKR	Serhiy Sydorchuk
17	MF	UKR	Serhiy Rybalka
19	MF	UKR	Denys Harmash
20	MF	UKR	Oleh Husyev (vice-captain)
22	FW	UKR	Artem Kravets
23	GK	UKR	Oleksandr Rybka

No.	Pos.	Nation	Player
24	DF	CRO	Domagoj Vida
26	DF	UKR	Mykyta Burda
27	DF	UKR	Yevhen Makarenko
28	MF	UKR	Yevhen Chumak
29	MF	UKR	Vitaliy Buyalskyi
30	DF	BRA	Betão
34	DF	UKR	Yevhen Khacheridi
45	MF	UKR	Vladyslav Kalytvyntsev
72	GK	UKR	Artur Rudko
85	FW	COD	Dieumerci Mbokani
90	MF	MAR	Younès Belhanda
91	FW	POL	Łukasz Teodorczyk

=== Out on loan ===
Note: Flags indicate national team as defined under FIFA eligibility rules; some limited exceptions apply. Players may hold more than one non-FIFA nationality.

No.	Pos.	Nation	Player
—	GK	UKR	Oleksiy Shevchenko (at Torpedo Kutaisi)
—	GK	UKR	Myroslav Bon (at Hoverla Uzhhorod)
—	GK	UKR	Maksym Koval (at Hoverla Uzhhorod)
—	DF	UKR	Vyacheslav Lukhtanov (at Hoverla Uzhhorod)
—	DF	UKR	Serhiy Lyulka (at Hoverla Uzhhorod)
—	DF	UKR	Dmytro Ryzhuk (at Metalist Kharkiv)
—	DF	UKR	Yevhen Selin (at Metalist Kharkiv)
—	DF	LAT	Vitālijs Jagodinskis (at Hoverla Uzhhorod)
—	MF	ARG	Facundo Bertoglio (at Tigre)
—	MF	UKR	Vitaliy Kaverin (at Hoverla Uzhhorod)

No.	Pos.	Nation	Player
—	MF	CRO	Niko Kranjčar (at Queens Park Rangers)
—	MF	UKR	Serhiy Myakushko (at Hoverla Uzhhorod)
—	MF	NGR	Lukman Haruna (at Hoverla Uzhhorod)
—	MF	UKR	Andriy Tsurikov (at Metalurh Zaporizhya)
—	MF	CRO	Ognjen Vukojević (at Dinamo Zagreb)
—	FW	COL	Andrés Escobar (at Atlético Nacional)
—	FW	UKR	Dmytro Khlyobas (at Hoverla Uzhhorod)
—	FW	UKR	Artem Besyedin (at Metalist Kharkiv)
—	FW	ARG	Marco Ruben (at Rosario Central)

=== Retired number(s) ===
12 – (Ukraine) Club Supporters (the 12th Man)

== Transfers ==
=== Summer ===
In: Note: Flags indicate national team as defined under FIFA eligibility rules; some limited exceptions apply. Players may hold more than one non-FIFA nationality.

No.	Pos.	Nation	Player
17	MF	UKR	Serhiy Rybalka (loan return from (Czech Republic) Slovan Liberec)
29	MF	UKR	Vitaliy Buyalskyi (loan return from (Ukraine) Hoverla Uzhhorod)
91	FW	POL	Łukasz Teodorczyk (from (Poland) Lech Poznań)

Out: Note: Flags indicate national team as defined under FIFA eligibility rules; some limited exceptions apply. Players may hold more than one non-FIFA nationality.

No.	Pos.	Nation	Player
5	MF	CRO	Ognjen Vukojević (loan to (Croatia) Dinamo Zagreb)
11	FW	NGR	Brown Ideye (to (England) West Bromwich Albion)
33	DF	FRA	Benoît Trémoulinas (to (Spain) Sevilla, previously on loan to (France) Saint-Étienne)
35	GK	UKR	Maksym Koval (loan to (Ukraine) Hoverla Uzhhorod)
99	MF	BRA	Dudu (to (Brazil) Palmeiras, previously on loan to Grêmio)

=== Winter ===
In: Note: Flags indicate national team as defined under FIFA eligibility rules; some limited exceptions apply. Players may hold more than one non-FIFA nationality.

No.	Pos.	Nation	Player
5	DF	POR	Vitorino Antunes (from (Spain) Málaga)
30	DF	BRA	Betão (from (Brazil) Ponte Preta)

Out: Note: Flags indicate national team as defined under FIFA eligibility rules; some limited exceptions apply. Players may hold more than one non-FIFA nationality.

No.	Pos.	Nation	Player
3	DF	UKR	Yevhen Selin (to (Ukraine) Metalist Kharkiv)
9	FW	UKR	Roman Bezus (to (Ukraine) Dnipro Dnipropetrovsk)
25	MF	NGR	Lukman Haruna (loan to (Ukraine) Hoverla Uzhhorod)
77	MF	UKR	Andriy Tsurikov (to (Ukraine) Metalurh Zaporizhya)

== Competitions ==
=== Ukrainian Premier League ===
==== Results summary ====
Overall								Home						Away					
Pld	W	D	L	GF	GA	GD	Pts	W	D	L	GF	GA	GD	W	D	L	GF	GA	GD
26	20	6	0	65	12	+53	66	9	4	0	30	5	+25	11	2	0	35	7	+28

==== Results by round ====
Round	1	2	3	4	5	6	7	8	9	10	11	12	13	14	15	16	17	18	19	20	21	22	23	24	25	26
Ground	H	A	H	A	H	A	H	H	A	A	H	A	A	H	H	A	H	A	H	A	A	H	A	H	A	H
Result	W	W	D	W	W	D	W	W	W	W	D	W	W	W	W	W	W	W	D	W		W	W	W	W	D
Position	6	3	4	3	3	3	3	2	2	1	1	1	1	1	1	1	1	1	1	1	1	1	1	1	1	1

Source: Soccerway
A = Away; H = Home; W = Win; D = Draw; L = Loss

==== Results ====
27 July 2014 1	Dynamo Kyiv	1 – 0	Vorskla Poltava	Kyiv
19:00 EEST (UTC+3)	Bezus 10'; Makarenko (yellow card) 51'; Kravets (yellow card) 58'; Vida (yellow card) 65'	Report	Dallku (yellow card) 65'	Stadium: NSC Olimpiyskiy; Attendance: 18,630; Referee: Yaroslav Kozyk

2 August 2014 2	Metalist Kharkiv	1 – 2	Dynamo Kyiv	Kharkiv
17:00 EEST (UTC+3)	Xavier 60' (pen.); Villagra (yellow card) 85'	Report	Kravets 14'; Rybalka (yellow card) 27' (yellow-red card) 85'; Yarmolenko 44' (pen.); Shovkovskyi (yellow card) 60'; Belhanda (yellow card) 68'; Harmash (yellow card) 78'; Bezus (yellow card) 90+2'	Stadium: OSC Metalist; Attendance: 17,624; Referee: Anatoliy Zhabchenko

9 August 2014 3	Dynamo Kyiv	0 – 0	Olimpik Donetsk	Kyiv
19:30 EEST (UTC+3)	Dragović (yellow card) 43'; Makarenko (yellow card) 69'	Report	Yeremenko (yellow card) 34'; Drachenko (yellow card) 58'; Kadymyan (yellow card) 71'; Lysenko (yellow card) 90+1'; Lebed (yellow card) 90+3'	Stadium: NSC Olimpiyskiy; Attendance: 14,180; Referee: Oleksandr Golovkov

17 August 2014 4	Illichivets Mariupol	1 – 4	Dynamo Kyiv	Kyiv
19:30 EEST (UTC+3)	Targamadze (yellow card) 12'; Chyzhov (yellow card) 52'; Ischenko (yellow card) 61'; Yavorskyi 65'	Report	Kravets 6', 58', 87'; Husyev 54'	Stadium: NSC Olimpiyskiy; Attendance: 12,140; Referee: Yuriy Moseychuk

30 August 2014 5	Dynamo Kyiv	2 – 0	Chornomorets Odesa	Kyiv
19:30 EEST (UTC+3)	Yarmolenko 20', 85'	Report	Fomin (yellow card) 74'	Stadium: NSC Olimpiyskiy; Attendance: 17,590; Referee: Yuri Mozharovskiy

13 September 2014 6	Zorya Luhansk	2 – 2	Dynamo Kyiv	Zaporizhia
19:30 EEST (UTC+3)	Khomchenovskyi 24'; Malyshev (yellow card) 36'; Yarmash (yellow card) 65'; Ljubenović 90+3'	Report	Silva (yellow card) 58'; Teodorczyk 59'; Belhanda (yellow card) 70'; Kravets 88'	Stadium: Slavutych-Arena; Attendance: 4,100; Referee: Anatoliy Abdula

22 September 2014 7	Dynamo Kyiv	4 – 1	Volyn Lutsk	Kyiv
19:00 EEST (UTC+3)	Yarmolenko 18', 61'; Lens 35'; Kalytvyntsev 85'	Report	Bicfalvi (yellow card) 51'; Žunić 72'	Stadium: NSC Olimpiyskiy; Attendance: 11,180; Referee: Kostyantin Trukhanov

5 October 2014 8	Dynamo Kyiv	1 – 0	Shakhtar Donetsk	Kyiv
19:30 EEST (UTC+3)	Kravets (yellow card) 34'; Vida 71'; Sydorchuk (yellow card) 82'; Dragović (yellow card) 90'; Yarmolenko (yellow card) 90+2'	Report	Ilsinho (yellow card) 6'; Luiz Adriano 16'; Shevchuk (yellow card) 41' (yellow-red card) 62'; Teixeira (yellow card) 58'; Srna (yellow card) 64'; Stepanenko (yellow card) 85'	Stadium: NSC Olimpiyskiy; Attendance: 57,502; Referee: Yuri Mozharovskiy

18 October 2014 9	Hoverla Uzhhorod	0 – 4	Dynamo Kyiv	Uzhhorod
19:30 EEST (UTC+3)	Akakpo (yellow card) 79'	Report	Kravets 12'; Sydorchuk 43'; Lens 46', (yellow card) 57'; Husyev 80' (pen.)	Stadium: Avanhard Stadium; Attendance: 8,800; Referee: Yury Vaks

2 November 2014 10	Dnipro Dnipropetrovsk	0 – 3	Dynamo Kyiv	Dnipropetrovsk
19:30 EET (UTC+2)	Rotan (yellow card) 33' (yellow-red card) 85'; Strinić (yellow card) 44'; Zozulya (yellow card) 83'	Report	Lens 28'; Rybalka (yellow card) 35'; Yarmolenko 40' (yellow card) 68'; Silva (yellow card) 43'; Sydorchuk (yellow card) 64'; Kravets 83'	Stadium: Dnipro-Arena; Attendance: 22,609; Referee: Victor Shvetsov

9 November 2014 11	Dynamo Kyiv	0 – 0	Karpaty Lviv	Kyiv
19:30 EET (UTC+2)	Sydorchuk (yellow card) 20' (yellow-red card) 87'; Rybalka (yellow card) 36'; Lens (yellow card) 90+5'	Report	Miroshnichenko (yellow card) 14'; Khudobyak (yellow card) 58'; Daushvili (yellow card) 77'; Mysak (yellow card) 80'; Plastun (yellow card) 90+1'	Stadium: NSC Olimpiyskiy; Attendance: 14,369; Referee: Yuriy Moseychuk

23 November 2014 12	Metalurh Zaporizhya	2 – 4	Dynamo Kyiv	Zaporizhia
19:30 EET (UTC+2)	Pryyomov (yellow card) 28'; Platon 50'; Orelesi 72'; Ulyanov (yellow card) 82'; Pashayev (yellow card) 85'	Report	Yarmolenko 41'; Lens 56', 90+3'; Veloso 61'; Vida (yellow card) 71'; Buyalskyi (yellow card) 89'	Stadium: Slavutych-Arena; Attendance: 4,320; Referee: Kostyantin Trukhanov

30 November 2014 13	Vorskla Poltava	0 – 3	Dynamo Kyiv	Poltava
19:30 EET (UTC+2)	Y. Tkachuk (yellow card) 12'	Report	Yarmolenko 53'; Mbokani 62', 67'	Stadium: Oleksiy Butovskyi Vorskla Stadium; Attendance: 35,00; Referee: Victor Shvetsov

5 December 2014 14	Dynamo Kyiv	3 – 0	Metalurh Donetsk	Kyiv
19:00 EET (UTC+2)	Dragović (yellow card) 8'; Mbokani 16'; Yarmolenko 40'; Kravets 83'	Report	Sobol (yellow card) 87'	Stadium: NSC Olimpiyskiy; Attendance: 10,196; Referee: Anatoliy Zhabchenko

1 March 2015 15	Dynamo Kyiv	3 – 0	Metalist Kharkiv	Kyiv
19:30 EET (UTC+2)	Rybalka (yellow card) 45'; Belhanda 52'; Buyalskyi 79'; Mbokani (yellow card) 90'; Dragović (yellow card) 90+2'; Chumak 90+4'	Report	Tkachuk (yellow card) 43'; Pryyomov (yellow card) 44'; Kovalchuk (yellow card) 51'; Kovtun (yellow card) 84'	Stadium: NSC Olimpiyskiy; Attendance: 15,374; Referee: Victor Shvetsov

8 March 2015 16	Olimpik Donetsk	0 – 1	Dynamo Kyiv	Kyiv
14:00 EET (UTC+2)	Doroshenko (yellow card) 34' (yellow-red card) 39'; Dytyatev (yellow card) 42'; Lytovka (yellow card) 85'; Hryshko (yellow card) 90+1'	Report	Antunes (yellow card) 73'; Burda 90+4'	Stadium: NSC Olimpiyskiy; Attendance: 14,287; Referee: Yaroslav Kozyk

15 March 2015 17	Dynamo Kyiv	5 – 0	Illichivets Mariupol	Kyiv
19:30 EET (UTC+2)	Belhanda (yellow card) 9'; Yarmolenko 37' (pen.), 62'; Zubkov 53' (o.g.); Teodorczyk 79'; Antunes 83'; Rybalka (yellow card) 88'	Report	Vakulenko (yellow card) 21'; Prykhodko (yellow card) 86'	Stadium: NSC Olimpiyskiy; Attendance: 7,500; Referee: Oleksandr Golovkov

4 April 2015 18	Chornomorets Odesa	0 – 2	Dynamo Kyiv	Kyiv
17:00 EEST (UTC+3)	Kabayev (yellow card) 9'; Fylymonov (yellow card) 34'; Kutas (yellow card) 40'; Martyshchuk (yellow card) 69'; Lutsenko (yellow card) 89'; Slinkin (yellow card) 90+3'	Report	Sydorchuk (yellow card) 5'; Husyev 49'; Buyalskyi (yellow card) 63'; Teodorczyk 76'	Stadium: Valeriy Lobanovskyi Dynamo Stadium; Attendance: 5,314; Referee: Anatoliy Zhabchenko

12 April 2015 19	Dynamo Kyiv	2 – 2	Zorya Luhansk	Kyiv
17:00 EEST (UTC+3)	Kravets 4'; Rybalka 35'; Antunes (yellow card) 90+1'	Report	Pylyavskyi 9' (pen.); Ljubenović 68'	Stadium: NSC Olimpiyskiy; Attendance: 7,200; Referee: Yaroslav Kozyk

19 April 2015 20	Volyn Lutsk	1 – 3	Dynamo Kyiv	Luhansk
19:30 EEST (UTC+3)	Bicfalvi 6' (pen.); Polyovyi (yellow card) 33'; Sharpar (yellow card) 59'; Babatunde (yellow card) 64'	Report	Yarmolenko (yellow card) 50'; Silva (yellow card) 61'; Lens (yellow card) 62'; Kravets 65', 69'; Buyalskyi 73'	Stadium: Avanhard Stadium; Referee: Victor Shvetsov

26 April 2015 21	Shakhtar Donetsk	0 – 0	Dynamo Kyiv	Lviv
19:30 EEST (UTC+3)	Taison (yellow card) 42'; Luiz Adriano (yellow card) 70'; Rakytskiy (yellow card) 79'	Report	Khacheridi (yellow card) 54'; Vida (yellow card) 90+4'	Stadium: Arena Lviv; Attendance: 32,509; Referee: Anatoliy Zhabchenko

1 May 2015 22	Dynamo Kyiv	6 – 0	Hoverla Uzhhorod	Kyiv
17:00 EEST (UTC+3)	Kravets 12', 28'; Hlushytskyi 20' (o.g.); Yarmolenko 30' (pen.); Sydorchuk 40'; Teodorczyk 73'	Report	Akimov (yellow card) 18'; Šimić (yellow card) 50'	Stadium: NSC Olimpiyskiy; Referee: Vitaly Romanov

10 May 2015 23	Metalurh Donetsk	0 – 6	Dynamo Kyiv	Kyiv
19:30 EEST (UTC+3)	Pryima (yellow card) 49'; Hovsepyan (yellow card) 52'; Myshenko (yellow card) 54'	Report	Yarmolenko 9', 27'; Khacheridi 45+2'; Dragović (yellow card) 45+4'; Kravets 50'; Belhanda 58'; Teodorczyk 77'	Stadium: NSC Olimpiyskiy; Attendance: 12,869; Referee: Yury Vaks

17 May 2015 24	Dynamo Kyiv	1 – 0	Dnipro Dnipropetrovsk	Kyiv
19:30 EEST (UTC+3)	Sydorchuk (yellow card) 60'; Vida 84', (yellow card) 87'	Report	Bezus (yellow card) 16'; Mihunov (yellow card) 90+2'	Stadium: NSC Olimpiyskiy; Attendance: 50,702; Referee: Anatoliy Zhabchenko

24 May 2015 25	Karpaty Lviv	0 – 1	Dynamo Kyiv	Lviv
19:30 EEST (UTC+3)	Serhiychuk (yellow card) 90+2'	Report	Kravets 58'	Stadium: Ukraina Stadium; Attendance: 11,800; Referee: Olexander Derdo

30 May 2015 26	Dynamo Kyiv	2 – 2	Metalurh Zaporizhya	Kyiv
17:00 EEST (UTC+3)	Sydorchuk 11'; Rudyka 67' (o.g.)	Report	Rudyka (yellow card) 14'; Platon (yellow card) 47', (goal) 58'; Kapliyenko 90+1'; Klymenchuk (yellow card) 90+1'; Zhurakhovskyi (yellow card) 90+4'	Stadium: NSC Olimpiyskiy; Attendance: 10,000; Referee: Igor Paskhal

==== League table ====
Pos	Team	Pld	W	D	L	GF	GA	GD	Pts	Qualification or relegation
1	Dynamo Kyiv (C)	26	20	6	0	65	12	+53	66	Qualification for the Champions League group stage
2	Shakhtar Donetsk	26	17	5	4	71	21	+50	56	Qualification for the Champions League third qualifying round
3	Dnipro Dnipropetrovsk	26	16	6	4	47	17	+30	54	Qualification for the Europa League group stage (Note: Since winners of 2014–15 Ukrainian Cup, Dynamo Kyiv, qualified for the 2015–16 UEFA Champions League, the place in the Europa League group stage for the cup winner will be given to the third-placed team and the spots to Europa League third qualifying round will be given to the fourth-placed and fifth-placed teams.)
4	Zorya Luhansk (Note: Zorya Luhansk were initially deducted a total of 3 points on decision of the FFU Control Disciplinary Committee on 18 February 2015, but the decision was reversed and the FFU reinstated the three points to Zorya Luhansk. (17 June 2015))	26	13	6	7	40	31	+9	45	Qualification for the Europa League third qualifying round
5	Vorskla Poltava	26	11	9	6	35	22	+13	42	Qualification for the Europa League third qualifying round

Source: uafootball.net.ua
Rules for classification: 1) points; 2) goal difference; 3) goals scored; 4) head-to-head points; 5) head-to-head goal difference; 6) head-to-head goals scored; 7) fair play rating
(C) Champions

=== Ukrainian Cup ===
23 August 2014 Round of 32	Zirka Kirovohrad	1 – 3	Dynamo Kyiv	Kirovohrad
18:00 EEST (UTC+3)	Batsula 90+1'; S. Rozhok (yellow card) 90+4'	Summary	Kravets 2'; Kalytvyntsev 12'; Dragović 66'	Stadium: Zirka Stadium; Attendance: 12,890; Referee: Yury Hrysyo

27 September 2014 Round of 16 1st leg	Karpaty Lviv	0 – 1	Dynamo Kyiv	Lviv
19:30 EEST (UTC+3)	Martynyuk (yellow card) 15'; Chachua (yellow card) 60'	Summary	Teodorczyk 4'; Sydorchuk (yellow card) 36'	Stadium: Ukraina Stadium; Attendance: 11,200; Referee: Yuriy Vaks

28 October 2014 Round of 16 2nd leg	Dynamo Kyiv	1 – 0 (2 – 0 agg.)	Karpaty Lviv	Kyiv
19:00 EEST (UTC+3)	Khacheridi (yellow card) 90'; Husyev 90+1'	Summary	Miroshnichenko (yellow card) 37'; Mysak (yellow card) 62'; Holodyuk (yellow card) 62'; Daushvili (yellow card) 63'	Stadium: NSC Olimpiyskiy; Attendance: 11,130; Referee: Oleksandr Ivanov

4 March 2015 Quarterfinal 1st leg	Zorya Luhansk	1 – 2	Dynamo Kyiv	Zaporizhya
17:00 EEST (UTC+3)	Kamenyuka 50', (yellow card) 82'; Chaykovskyi (yellow card) 90+3'	Summary	Husyev 12' (pen.); Kravets 21'; Harmash (yellow card) 90'	Stadium: Slavutych Arena; Attendance: 1,500; Referee: Yuriy Morzharovskyi

8 April 2015 Quarterfinal 2nd leg	Dynamo Kyiv	2 – 0 (4 – 1 agg.)	Zorya Luhansk	Kyiv
EEST (UTC+3)	Belhanda 33'; Teodorczyk 42'	Summary		Stadium: NSC Olimpiyskiy; Attendance: 8,200; Referee: Konstiantyn Trukhanov

29 April 2015 Semifinal 1st Leg	Olimpik Donetsk	0 – 0	Dynamo Kyiv	Kyiv
20:00 EET (UTC+2)	Doronin (yellow card) 24'; Sytnik (yellow card) 87'; Ohirya (yellow card) 90+5'	Summary	Sydorchuk (yellow card) 21'; Dragović (yellow card) 68'; Buyalskyi (yellow card) 75' (yellow-red card) 90+4'	Stadium: Bannikov Stadium; Attendance: 8,500; Referee: Yury Vaks

20 May 2015 Semifinal 2nd Leg	Dynamo Kyiv	4 – 1 (4 – 1 agg.)	Olimpik Donetsk	Kyiv
19:00 EEST (UTC+3)		Report		Stadium: NSC Olimpiyskiy

==== Final ====
4 June 2015	Dynamo Kyiv	0 – 0 (5 – 4 p)	Shakhtar Donetsk	Kyiv
21:00 EEST (UTC+3)	Kravets (yellow card) 56'; Yarmolenko (yellow card) 62'; Dragović (yellow card) 68'; Rybalka (yellow card) 81' (yellow-red card) 115'; Khacheridi (yellow card) 82'; Vida (yellow card) 88'	Report	Ilsinho (yellow card) 44'; Srna (yellow card) 55'; Taison (yellow card) 120'	Stadium: NSC Olimpiyskiy Stadium; Attendance: 53,455; Referee: Yuriy Mozharovsky
	Penalties
	Veloso (penalty missed); Dragović (penalty scored); Antunes (penalty missed); Husyev (penalty scored); Yarmolenko (penalty scored); Belhanda (penalty scored); Khacheridi (penalty scored)		Srna (penalty scored); Luiz Adriano (penalty scored); Douglas Costa (penalty scored); Taison (penalty missed); Rakytskiy (penalty missed); Teixeira (penalty scored); Hladkyy (penalty missed)

=== Europa League ===
==== Group stage ====
Pos	Team	Pld	W	D	L	GF	GA	GD	Pts	Qualification	DYK	AAB	STE	RIO
1	(Ukraine) Dynamo Kyiv	6	5	0	1	12	4	+8	15	Advance to knockout phase	—	2–0	3–1	2–0
2	(Denmark) AaB	6	3	0	3	5	10	−5	9	Advance to knockout phase	3–0	—	1–0	1–0
3	(Romania) Steaua București	6	2	1	3	11	9	+2	7		0–2	6–0	—	2–1
4	(Portugal) Rio Ave	6	1	1	4	5	10	−5	4		0–3	2–0	2–2	—

Source: Soccerway

18 September 2014 1	Rio Ave (Portugal)	0 – 3	(Ukraine) Dynamo Kyiv	Vila do Conde, Portugal
22:05 EEST (UTC+3)	Bressan (yellow card) 31'; Jebor (yellow card) 89'	Report	Yarmolenko 20'; Kravets (yellow card) 22', (goal) 70'; Belhanda 25'; Vida (yellow card) 47'; Burda (yellow card) 59'	Stadium: Estádio dos Arcos; Attendance: Stefan Johannesson (Sweden); Referee: 2,315

2 October 2014 2	Dynamo Kyiv (Ukraine)	3 – 1	(Romania) Steaua București	Kyiv, Ukraine
20:00 EEST (UTC+3)	Yarmolenko 40'; Kravets 66'; Rybalka (yellow card) 86'; Teodorczyk 90+1'	Report	Papp (yellow card) 38'; Szukała (yellow card) 77'; Rusescu 89'; Tănase (yellow card) 90+1'; Prepeliță (yellow card) 90+2'	Stadium: Olympic Stadium; Attendance: 15,000; Referee: Robert Schörgenhofer (Austria)

23 October 2014 3	AaB (Denmark)	3 – 0	(Ukraine) Dynamo Kyiv	Aalborg, Denmark
20:00 EEST (UTC+3)	Enevoldsen 11'; Thomsen 39', 90+1'; Würtz (yellow card) 54'; Thelander (yellow card) 77'	Report	Burda (yellow card) 57'; Belhanda (yellow card) 65'; Silva (yellow card) 88'	Stadium: Nordjyske Arena; Attendance: 6,043; Referee: Stephan Studer (Switzerland)

6 November 2014 4	Dynamo Kyiv (Ukraine)	2 – 0	(Denmark) Aalborg BK	Kyiv, Ukraine
21:05 EET (UTC+2)	Vida (yellow card) 43' (goal) 70'; Dragović (red card) 68'; Sydorchuk (yellow card) 76'; Husyev 90+3'	Report		Stadium: Olympic Stadium; Attendance: 25,230; Referee: Aleksei Kulbakov (Belarus)

27 November 2014 5	Dynamo Kyiv (Ukraine)	2 – 0	(Portugal) Rio Ave	Kyiv, Ukraine
20:00 EEST (UTC+3)	Sydorchuk (yellow card) 25'; Kravets (yellow card) 52'; Lens 53'; Veloso 78'; Vida (yellow card) 85'	Report	Luís Gustavo (yellow card) 36'	Stadium: Olympic Stadium; Attendance: 14,500; Referee: Tom Harald Hagen (Norway)

11 December 2014 6	Steaua București (Romania)	0 – 2	(Ukraine) Dynamo Kyiv	Bucharest, Romania
22:05 EET (UTC+2)	Papp (yellow card) 45+1'	Report	Dragović (yellow card) 26'; Veloso (yellow card) 52'; Yarmolenko 71'; Burda (yellow card) 81'; Lens 90+4'	Stadium: Arena Națională; Attendance: 7,620; Referee: Michael Oliver (England)

==== Knockout phase ====
19 February 2015 Round of 32 1st leg	Guingamp (France)	2 – 1	(Ukraine) Dynamo Kyiv	Guingamp, France
22:05 EET (UTC+2)	Mandanne (yellow card) 16'; Sankharé (yellow card) 34'; Lévêque (yellow card) 66'; Beauvue 72'; Diallo 75'	Report	Veloso 19'; Sydorchuk (yellow card) 21'; Yarmolenko (red card) 39'; Belhanda (red card) 45'; Rybalka (yellow card) 45'; Husyev (yellow card) 45+2'; Vida (yellow card) 88'	Stadium: Stade du Roudourou; Attendance: 16,191; Referee: Slavko Vinčić (Slovenia)

26 February 2015 Round of 32 2nd leg	Dynamo Kyiv (Ukraine)	3 – 1 (4 – 3 agg.)	(France) Guingamp	Kyiv, Ukraine
20:00 EEST (UTC+3)	Rybalka (yellow card) 1'; Teodorczyk 31'; Buyalskyi 46', (yellow card) 47'; Husyev 75' (pen.); Lens (yellow card) 89'	Report	Mathis (yellow card) 8'; Mandanne 68'	Stadium: Olympic Stadium; Attendance: 54,308; Referee: Martin Strömbergsson (Sweden)

12 March 2015 Round of 16 1st leg	Everton (England)	2 – 1	(Ukraine) Dynamo Kyiv	Liverpool, England
22:05 EET (UTC+2)	Mirallas (yellow card) 16'; Naismith 39'; Lukaku 82' (pen.)	Report	Husyev 14'; Mbokani (yellow card) 90'	Stadium: Goodison Park; Attendance: 26,150; Referee: Carlos Velasco Carballo (Spain)

19 March 2015 Round of 16 2nd leg	Dynamo Kyiv (Ukraine)	5 – 2 (6 – 4 agg.)	(England) Everton	Kyiv, Ukraine
20:00 EEST (UTC+3)	Yarmolenko 21'; Teodorczyk 35'; Veloso 37'; Husyev 56'; Antunes 76', (yellow card) 90+1'; Rybalka (yellow card) 83'; Dragović (yellow card) 85'	Report	Lukaku 29', (yellow card) 83'; Jagielka 82'; Bešić (yellow card) 90+4'	Stadium: Olympic Stadium; Attendance: 67,553; Referee: Deniz Aytekin (Germany)

16 April 2015 Quarter-final 1st leg	Dynamo Kyiv (Ukraine)	1 – 1	(Italy) Fiorentina	Kyiv, Ukraine
22:05 EEST (UTC+3)	Lens 36', (yellow card) 71'; Dragović (yellow card) 44'; Sydorchuk (yellow card) 65'; Khacheridi (yellow card) 69'	Report	Gómez (yellow card) 45+2'; Alonso (yellow card) 66'; Babacar 90+2'; Tomović (yellow card) 90+4'	Stadium: Olympic Stadium; Referee: Szymon Marciniak (Poland)

23 April 2015 Quarter-final 2nd leg	Fiorentina (Italy)	2 – 0 (3 – 1 agg.)	(Ukraine) Dynamo Kyiv	Florence. Italy
22:05 EEST (UTC+3)	Gómez 43'; Vargas 90+4'	Summary	Lens (yellow card) 14' (yellow-red card) 40'	Stadium: Stadio Artemio Franchi; Attendance: 28,058; Referee: Jonas Eriksson (Sweden)

== Squad statistics ==
As of match played 4 June 2014

=== Appearances and goals ===
No.	Pos	Nat	Player	Total		Premier League		Ukrainian Cup		Europa League	
No.	Pos	Nat	Player	Apps	Goals	Apps	Goals	Apps	Goals	Apps	Goals
1	GK	(Ukraine) UKR	Oleksandr Shovkovskyi	29	0	18	0	2	0	9	0
2	DF	(Brazil) BRA	Danilo Silva	37	0	25	0	2	0	10	0
4	MF	(Portugal) POR	Miguel Veloso	27	4	9+5	1	3+1	0	5+4	3
5	DF	(Portugal) POR	Vitorino Antunes	16	2	8	1	1+1	0	6	1
6	DF	(Austria) AUT	Aleksandar Dragović	40	1	24	0	6	1	10	0
7	FW	(Netherlands) NED	Jeremain Lens	36	8	18+3	5	5	0	10	3
10	FW	(Ukraine) UKR	Andriy Yarmolenko	41	18	24+2	14	3+1	0	11	4
14	MF	(Ukraine) UKR	Bohdan Mykhaylychenko	2	0	0+1	0	1	0	0	0
16	MF	(Ukraine) UKR	Serhiy Sydorchuk	39	3	18+4	3	5+1	0	9+2	0
17	MF	(Ukraine) UKR	Serhiy Rybalka	39	1	19+3	1	4+2	0	11	0
19	MF	(Ukraine) UKR	Denys Harmash	9	0	3+3	0	0+2	0	0+1	0
20	MF	(Ukraine) UKR	Oleh Husyev	32	9	8+9	3	4+2	2	4+5	4
22	FW	(Ukraine) UKR	Artem Kravets	39	19	19+5	15	3+2	2	8+2	2
23	GK	(Ukraine) UKR	Oleksandr Rybka	16	0	8	0	5	0	3	0
24	DF	(Croatia) CRO	Domagoj Vida	35	3	20	2	5	0	9+1	1
26	DF	(Ukraine) UKR	Mykyta Burda	13	1	3+1	1	3	0	5+1	0
27	DF	(Ukraine) UKR	Yevhen Makarenko	10	0	7	0	2	0	1	0
28	MF	(Ukraine) UKR	Yevhen Chumak	10	1	2+3	1	0+2	0	0+3	0
29	MF	(Ukraine) UKR	Vitaliy Buyalskyi	23	3	5+6	2	3+2	0	4+3	1
30	DF	(Brazil) BRA	Betão	3	0	0	0	3	0	0	0
34	DF	(Ukraine) UKR	Yevhen Khacheridi	25	1	13	1	5	0	6+1	0
37	MF	(Ukraine) UKR	Oleksandr Andriyevskyi	1	0	0+1	0	0	0	0	0
45	MF	(Ukraine) UKR	Vladyslav Kalytvyntsev	14	2	4+2	1	2+1	1	0+5	0
85	FW	(Democratic Republic of the Congo) COD	Dieumerci Mbokani	12	3	5+3	3	1	0	1+2	0
90	MF	(Morocco) MAR	Younès Belhanda	39	4	22+2	2	5+1	1	7+2	1
91	FW	(Poland) POL	Łukasz Teodorczyk	23	10	2+11	5	3+1	2	3+3	3
Players who left Dynamo Kyiv on loan during the season :
Players who left Dynamo Kyiv during the season :
3	DF	(Ukraine) UKR	Yevhen Selin	3	0	0+2	0	0	0	0+1	0
9	FW	(Ukraine) UKR	Roman Bezus	11	1	2+7	1	1+1	0	0	0
77	MF	(Ukraine) UKR	Andriy Tsurikov	1	0	0	0	0+1	0	0	0

=== Goalscorers ===
Place	Position	Nation	Number	Name	Premier League	Ukrainian Cup	Europa League	Total
1	FW	(Ukraine)	22	Artem Kravets	15	2	2	19
2	FW	(Ukraine)	10	Andriy Yarmolenko	14	0	4	18
3	FW	(Poland)	91	Łukasz Teodorczyk	5	2	3	10
4	MF	(Ukraine)	20	Oleh Husyev	3	2	4	9
5	FW	(Netherlands)	7	Jeremain Lens	5	0	3	8
6	MF	(Morocco)	90	Younès Belhanda	2	1	1	4
6	MF	(Portugal)	4	Miguel Veloso	1	0	3	4
8	FW	(Democratic Republic of the Congo)	85	Dieumerci Mbokani	3	0	0	3
8	MF	(Ukraine)	16	Serhiy Sydorchuk	3	0	3	
8				Own goal	3	0	0	3
8	MF	(Ukraine)	29	Vitaliy Buyalskyi	2	0	1	3
8	DF	(Croatia)	24	Domagoj Vida	2	0	1	3
13	MF	(Ukraine)	45	Vladyslav Kalytvyntsev	1	1	0	2
13	DF	(Portugal)	5	Vitorino Antunes	1	0	1	2
15	FW	(Ukraine)	9	Roman Bezus	1	0	0	1
15	MF	(Ukraine)	28	Yevhen Chumak	1	0	0	1
15	DF	(Ukraine)	26	Mykyta Burda	1	0	0	1
15	MF	(Ukraine)	17	Serhiy Rybalka	1	0	0	1
15	DF	(Ukraine)	34	Yevhen Khacheridi	1	0	0	1
15	DF	(Austria)	6	Aleksandar Dragović	0	1	0	1
				TOTALS	65	9	23	97

=== Disciplinary record ===
Number	Nation	Position	Name	Premier League		Ukrainian Cup		Europa League		Total	
Number	Nation	Position	Name	Yellow card	Red card	Yellow card	Red card	Yellow card	Red card	Yellow card	Red card
1	(Ukraine)	GK	Oleksandr Shovkovskyi	1	0	0	0	0	0	1	0
2	(Brazil)	DF	Danilo Silva	3	0	0	0	1	0	4	0
4	(Portugal)	MF	Miguel Veloso	0	0	0	0	1	0	1	0
5	(Portugal)	DF	Vitorino Antunes	2	0	0	0	1	0	3	0
6	(Austria)	DF	Aleksandar Dragović	5	0	3	0	3	1	11	1
7	(Netherlands)	FW	Jeremain Lens	3	0	0	0	4	1	7	1
9	(Ukraine)	FW	Roman Bezus	1	0	0	0	0	0	1	0
10	(Ukraine)	FW	Andriy Yarmolenko	3	0	1	0	0	1	4	1
14	(Ukraine)	MF	Serhiy Rybalka	6	1	2	1	4	0	12	2
16	(Ukraine)	MF	Serhiy Sydorchuk	6	1	2	0	4	0	12	1
19	(Ukraine)	MF	Denys Harmash	1	0	2	0	1	0	4	0
20	(Ukraine)	MF	Oleh Husyev	0	0	0	0	1	0	1	0
22	(Ukraine)	FW	Artem Kravets	2	0	1	0	2	0	5	0
24	(Croatia)	DF	Domagoj Vida	4	0	1	0	4	0	9	0
26	(Ukraine)	DF	Mykyta Burda	0	0	0	0	3	0	3	0
27	(Ukraine)	DF	Yevhen Makarenko	2	0	0	0	0	0	2	0
29	(Ukraine)	MF	Vitaliy Buyalskyi	2	0	2	1	1	0	5	1
34	(Ukraine)	DF	Yevhen Khacheridi	1	0	2	0	1	0	4	0
85	(Democratic Republic of the Congo)	FW	Dieumerci Mbokani	1	0	0	0	1	0	2	0
90	(Morocco)	MF	Younès Belhanda	3	0	1	0	1	1	5	1
			TOTALS	50	3	13	1	33	4	96	8

== Notes ==
Notes

1. Originally scheduled on 30 October 2014, games Dnipro – Volyn, Dynamo – Karpaty, and Metalist – Hoverla were moved to earlier dates.
2. Steaua București played their home matches at Arena Națională, Bucharest instead of their regular stadium, Stadionul Steaua, Bucharest.
3. Shakhtar Donetsk play their home matches at Arena Lviv, Lviv instead of their regular stadium, Donbas Arena, Donetsk, due to the war conditions in Eastern Ukraine.
