= 2023–24 Ukrainian Premier League =

33rd season of top-tier football league in Vyshcha Liha

VBet Liha (UPL)
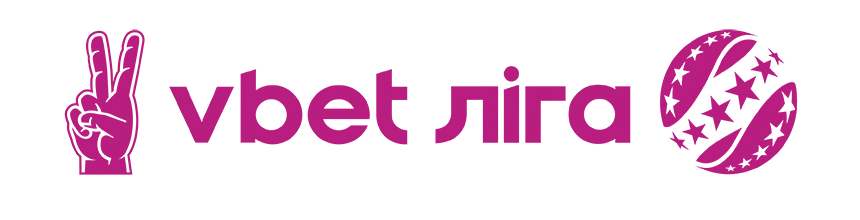
- Official logo
- Season: 2023–24
- Dates: 29 July 2023 – 25 May 2024; 12 December 2023 – 23 February 2024 (winter break)
- Champions: Shakhtar Donetsk; 15th Ukrainian league title
- Relegated: FC Mynai; Metalist 1925 Kharkiv; SC Dnipro-1 (bankrupt)
- Champions League: Shakhtar Donetsk; Dynamo Kyiv
- Europa League: Kryvbas Kryvyi Rih
- Conference League: Dnipro-1; Polissya Zhytomyr
- Matches: 240
- Goals: 594 (2.48 per match)
- Top goalscorer: Vladyslav Vanat (Dynamo) (14 goals)
- Biggest home win: Dynamo 5–0 Kolos (5 May 2024)
- Biggest away win: Oleksandriya 1–5 Chornomorets (22 September 2023); Vorskla 1–5 Dynamo (31 March 2024)
- Highest scoring: 7 goals (4 matches)
- Highest attendance: 2800; Vorskla 1–5 Dynamo (31 March 2024); Veres 2–2 Oleksandriya (19 May 2024)
- Total attendance: 86 019
- All statistics correct as of 03 June 2024.

The 2023–24 Ukrainian Premier League season, referred to as the VBet Liha for sponsorship reasons, was the 33rd top-level football club competition since the fall of the Soviet Union and the 16th since the establishment of the Ukrainian Premier League. The competition took place during the ongoing war with the Russia since late February 2022. On 7 June 2023 the UPL published highlights of the next season regulation draft announcing that preliminary the next season is expected to start on 29 July 2023. Also, this season had the national cup competitions restored which started on 16 August. The season regulation draft is yet to be approved by the General Assembly of the UPL participants.

== Teams ==
This season the Ukrainian Premier League remained at 16 teams. Two teams had their status suspended due to the Russian occupation and/or destruction of their sports infrastructure. If one or both of Desna and Mariupol decide to return to the league competitions next season, it has been determined that the league would be increased to 18 teams. On 9 June 2023 the president of FC Desna stated that the club would return to professional football the next season in 2024 and would start from the Second League due to issues with player transfers.

=== Promoted teams ===
- Polissia Zhytomyr – first-placed team of the 2022–23 Ukrainian First League (debut)
- Obolon Kyiv – second-placed team of the 2022–23 Ukrainian First League (returning, last competed in 2011–12, for the first time since its reorganization in 2013)
- LNZ Cherkasy – winner of promotion/relegation play-off (debut)

=== Relegated teams ===
- Inhulets Petrove – Relegated after three seasons in the top flight.
- Metalist Kharkiv – Relegated after one season in the top flight
- FC Lviv – Relegated after five seasons in the top flight.

=== Location map ===
Home venues of teams in the 2023–24 Ukrainian Premier League.
Several teams were playing their home games in different cities due to the Russian invasion of Ukraine

=== Stadiums ===
The minimum threshold for the stadium's capacity in the UPL is 4,500 (Article 10, paragraph 7.3).

The following stadiums are regarded as home grounds:

Rank	Stadium	Place	Club	Capacity	Notes
1	Arena Lviv	Lviv	Rukh Lviv	34,915	
1	Arena Lviv	Lviv	Shakhtar Donetsk	34,915	used as home ground during the season
2	Chornomorets Stadium	Odesa	Chornomorets Odesa	34,164	
3	Dnipro-Arena	Dnipro	Dnipro-1	31,003	
4	Ukraina Stadium	Lviv	Rukh Lviv	27,925	used as home ground in 1 match
4	Ukraina Stadium	Lviv	Zorya Luhansk	27,925	used as home ground in 1 match
5	Butovsky Vorskla Stadium	Poltava	Vorskla Poltava	24,795	
6	Lobanovskyi Dynamo Stadium	Kyiv	Dynamo Kyiv	16,873	
6	Lobanovskyi Dynamo Stadium	Kyiv	Metalist 1925 Kharkiv	16,873	used as home ground in 1 match
6	Lobanovskyi Dynamo Stadium	Kyiv	FC Mynai	16,873	used as home ground in 1 match
6	Lobanovskyi Dynamo Stadium	Kyiv	Zorya Luhansk	16,873	used as home ground in 1 match
7	Avanhard Stadium	Uzhhorod	Dnipro-1	12,000	used as home ground in 3 matches
7	Avanhard Stadium	Uzhhorod	Zorya Luhansk	12,000	used as home ground in 1 match
8	Tsentralnyi Stadion	Cherkasy	LNZ Cherkasy	10,321	
9	CSC Nika Stadium	Oleksandriya	FC Oleksandriya	7,000	
10	Tsentralnyi Stadion	Zhytomyr	Polissya Zhytomyr	5,928	
10	Tsentralnyi Stadion	Zhytomyr	Zorya Luhansk	5,928	used as home ground in 1 match
11	Obolon Arena	Kyiv	Obolon Kyiv	5,100	
12	Kolos Stadium	Kovalivka	Kolos Kovalivka	5,050	
12	Kolos Stadium	Kovalivka	LNZ Cherkasy	5,050	used as home ground in 2 matches
12	Kolos Stadium	Kovalivka	Zorya Luhansk	5,050	used as home ground in 1 match
13	Arena Livyi Bereh	Zolochivska hromada	Metalist 1925 Kharkiv	4,700	used as home ground during the season
13	Arena Livyi Bereh	Zolochivska hromada	Zorya Luhansk	4,700	used as home ground during the season
13	Arena Livyi Bereh	Zolochivska hromada	Shakhtar Donetsk	4,700	used as home ground in 2 matches
13	Arena Livyi Bereh	Zolochivska hromada	Chornomorets Odesa	4,700	used as home ground in 1 match
14	Avanhard Stadium	Rivne	Veres Rivne	4,650	
15	Skif Stadium	Lviv	Zorya Luhansk	4,033	used as home ground in 1 match
16	Hirnyk Stadium	Kryvyi Rih	Kryvbas Kryvyi Rih	2,500	
17	Mynai Arena	Mynai	FC Mynai	1,312	

=== Personnel and sponsorship ===
Team	President	Head coach	Captain	Kit manufacturer	Shirt sponsor
Chornomorets Odesa	Leonid Klimov	(Ukraine) Roman Hryhorchuk	(Ukraine) Illya Putrya	Kelme	Vbet
Dnipro-1	Maksym Bereza	(Ukraine) Yuriy Maksymov	(Ukraine) Oleksandr Svatok	Nike	Windrose
Dynamo Kyiv	Ihor Surkis	(Ukraine) Oleksandr Shovkovskyi	(Ukraine) Vitaliy Buyalskyi	New Balance	A-Bank
Kolos Kovalivka	Andriy Zasukha	(Ukraine) Oleksandr Pozdeyev	(Ukraine) Vadym Milko	Nike	ATTP
Kryvbas Kryvyi Rih	Kostyantyn Karamanits	(Ukraine) Yuriy Vernydub	(Ukraine) Dmytro Khomchenovskyi	Joma	Rudomain
LNZ Cherkasy	Andriy Poltavets	(Belarus) Oleg Dulub	(Ukraine) Oleh Tarasenko	Macron	Vbet
Metalist 1925 Kharkiv	Yaroslav Vdovenko	(Ukraine) Viktor Skrypnyk	(Ukraine) Artem Habelok	Puma	AES group
Mynai	Valeriy Peresolyak	(Serbia) Željko Ljubenović	(Ukraine) Oleksandr Bandura	Kelme	FavBet
Obolon Kyiv	Oleksandr Slobodian	(Ukraine) Valeriy Ivashchenko	(Ukraine) Nazariy Fedorivskyi	Jako	FavBet
Oleksandriya	Serhiy Kuzmenko	(Ukraine) Ruslan Rotan	(Ukraine) Vladyslav Kalitvintsev	Nike	AhroVista
Polissya Zhytomyr	Volodymyr Zahurskyi	(Ukraine) Serhiy Shyshchenko (caretaker)	(Ukraine) Vladyslav Ohirya	Nike	BGV Group
Rukh Lviv	Hryhoriy Kozlovskyi	(Ukraine) Vitaliy Ponomaryov	(Ukraine) Marko Sapuha	Macron	Emily Resort
Shakhtar Donetsk	Rinat Akhmetov	(Bosnia and Herzegovina) (Note: Born on territory of Bosnian republic in Yugoslavia before its dissolution, Marino Pušić is of mixed ethnic background and carries a dual citizenship.) Marino Pušić	(Ukraine) Taras Stepanenko	Puma	FavBet
Veres Rivne	Ivan Nadieyin	(Ukraine) Oleh Shandruk	(Ukraine) Bohdan Kohut	Kelme	Vbet
Vorskla Poltava	Kostyantyn Zhevago	(Ukraine) Serhiy Dolhanskyi (caretaker)	(Ukraine) Volodymyr Chesnakov	Nike	Ferrexpo
Zorya Luhansk	Yevhen Heller	(Ukraine) Yuriy Koval (caretaker)	(Ukraine) Vyacheslav Churko	Puma	—

=== Managerial changes ===
Team	Outgoing manager	Manner of departure	Date of vacancy	Table	Incoming manager	Date of appointment
Shakhtar Donetsk	(Croatia) Igor Jovićević	Fired	8 June 2023 (Note: Confirmed on 1 July 2023)	Pre-season	(Netherlands) Patrick van Leeuwen	3 July 2023
Veres Rivne	(Ukraine) Yuriy Virt	Resigned	14 June 2023	Pre-season	(Ukraine) Serhiy Lavrynenko	16 June 2023
Zorya Luhansk	(Netherlands) Patrick van Leeuwen	Signed with Shakhtar	3 July 2023	Pre-season	(Serbia) Nenad Lalatović	4 July 2023
SC Dnipro-1	(Ukraine) Oleksandr Kucher	Resigned	20 August 2023	11th	(Ukraine) Valeriy Horodov (interim)	21 August 2023
LNZ Cherkasy	(Ukraine) Oleksandr Kovpak	Fired	23 August 2023	13th	(Ukraine) Yuriy Dudnyk (caretaker)	25 August 2023
LNZ Cherkasy	(Ukraine) Yuriy Dudnyk (caretaker)	End of interim	30 August 2023	15th	(Belarus) Oleg Dulub	30 August 2023
Zorya Luhansk	(Serbia) Nenad Lalatović	Resigned	27 August 2023	11th	(Croatia) Mladen Bartulović (caretaker)	27 August 2023
Zorya Luhansk	(Croatia) Mladen Bartulović (caretaker)	End of interim	9 September 2023	12th	(Ukraine) Valeriy Kryventsov	9 September 2023
SC Dnipro-1	(Ukraine) Valeriy Horodov (interim)	End of interim	14 September 2023	11th	(Ukraine) Yuriy Maksymov	14 September 2023
Shakhtar Donetsk	(Netherlands) Patrick van Leeuwen	Fired	16 October 2023	2nd	(Croatia) Darijo Srna (interim)	16 October 2023
Shakhtar Donetsk	(Croatia) Darijo Srna (interim)	Returned to previous position	24 October 2023	3rd	(Bosnia and Herzegovina) Marino Pušić	24 October 2023
Dynamo Kyiv	(Romania) Mircea Lucescu	Resigned	3 November 2023	7th	(Ukraine) Oleksandr Shovkovskyi (caretaker)	4 November 2023
Metalist 1925 Kharkiv	(Ukraine) Edmar (caretaker)	Resigned	5 November 2023	9th	(Ukraine) Oleh Holodyuk (caretaker)	5 November 2023
Zorya Luhansk	(Ukraine) Valeriy Kryventsov	Resigned	11 November 2023	13th	(Ukraine) Yuriy Koval (caretaker)	11 November 2023
FC Mynai	(Ukraine) Volodymyr Sharan	Mutual agreement	17 November 2023	16th	(Serbia) Željko Ljubenović	18 November 2023
Dynamo Kyiv	(Ukraine) Oleksandr Shovkovskyi (caretaker)	Made a head coach	12 December 2023	5th	(Ukraine) Oleksandr Shovkovskyi	12 December 2023
Veres Rivne	(Ukraine) Serhiy Lavrynenko	Sacked	12 December 2023	15th	(Ukraine) Oleh Shandruk	12 December 2023
Metalist 1925 Kharkiv	(Ukraine) Oleh Holodyuk (caretaker)	Change of role	20 December 2023	12th	(Ukraine) Viktor Skrypnyk	20 December 2023
Vorskla Poltava	(Ukraine) Viktor Skrypnyk	Mutual agreement	20 December 2023	7th	(Ukraine) Serhiy Dolhanskyi (caretaker)	4 January 2024
Polissya Zhytomyr	(Ukraine) Yuriy Kalitvintsev	Resigned	11 March 2024	6th	(Ukraine) Serhiy Shyshchenko (caretaker)	12 March 2024
Kolos Kovalivka	(Ukraine) Yaroslav Vyshnyak	Change of role	28 April 2024	12th	(Ukraine) Oleksandr Pozdeyev (caretaker)	28 April 2024
Kolos Kovalivka	(Ukraine) Oleksandr Pozdeyev (caretaker)	End of interim	12 May 2024	12th	(Ukraine) Oleksandr Pozdeyev	12 May 2024

== League table ==
Pos	Team	Pld	W	D	L	GF	GA	GD	Pts	Qualification or relegation
1	Shakhtar Donetsk (C)	30	22	5	3	63	24	+39	71	Qualification for the Champions League league stage (Note: Since already qualified Real Madrid won the Champions League, Shakhtar Donetsk was promoted to the Champions League league phase as the champion with the highest coefficient in Champions League qualifying.)
2	Dynamo Kyiv	30	22	3	5	72	28	+44	69	Qualification for the Champions League second qualifying round
3	Kryvbas Kryvyi Rih	30	17	6	7	51	30	+21	57	Qualification for the Europa League third qualifying round (Note: Since the 2023–24 Ukrainian Cup winners (Shakhtar Donetsk) finished in the top two, the Europa League spot was passed to the third-placed team, and the second Conference League second qualifying round spot was passed to the fifth-placed team.)
4	Dnipro-1 (D)	30	14	10	6	40	27	+13	52	Withdrew after the season (Note: SC Dnipro-1 that withdrew from all tournaments of the 2024–25 season due to financial hardship after finishing 4th in the league qualified for the Conference League second qualifying round, however it was awarded technical losses in both matches (0:3).)
5	Polissya Zhytomyr	30	14	8	8	39	30	+9	50	Qualification for the Conference League second qualifying round
6	Rukh Lviv	30	12	13	5	44	31	+13	49	
7	LNZ Cherkasy	30	11	8	11	31	34	−3	41	
8	Oleksandriya	30	8	10	12	30	38	−8	34	
9	Vorskla Poltava	30	9	6	15	30	46	−16	33	
10	Zorya Luhansk	30	7	11	12	29	37	−8	32 (Note: Zorya Luhansk finished ahead of Kolos Kovalivka and Chornomorets Odesa on head-to-head points: Zorya Luhansk 7, Kolos Kovalivka 6, Chornomorets Odesa 4)	
11	Kolos Kovalivka	30	7	11	12	22	31	−9	32	
12	Chornomorets Odesa	30	10	2	18	38	47	−9	32	
13	Veres Rivne (O)	30	6	10	14	31	46	−15	28	Qualification for the Relegation play-off
14	Obolon Kyiv (O)	30	5	11	14	18	41	−23	26	Qualification for the Relegation play-off
15	Mynai (R)	30	5	10	15	27	50	−23	25	Qualification for the mini tournament
16	Metalist 1925 Kharkiv (R)	30	5	8	17	32	57	−25	23	Qualification for the mini tournament

Source: upl.ua
Rules for classification: 1) Points; 2) Head-to-head points; 3) Head-to-head goal difference; 4) Head-to-head goals scored; 5) Goal difference; 6) Goals scored; 7) Draw or "Golden match" if two teams tied for title (Article 22, paragraph 3).
(C) Champions; (D) Disqualified; (O) Play-off winners; (R) Relegated

== Results ==
Teams play each other twice on a home and away basis.

Home \ Away	CHO	DN1	DYN	KOL	KRY	LNZ	M25	MYN	OBL	OLK	PZH	RUX	SHA	VER	VOR	ZOR
Chornomorets Odesa		0–2	3–2	1–0	1–2	1–3	3–0	3–0	2–0	3–2	1–0	2–3	1–4	0–1	0–1	0–0
Dnipro-1	5–2		1–2	1–1	1–0	0–0	1–0	1–1	1–2	1–0	2–1	0–1	1–1	2–0	1–2	2–2
Dynamo Kyiv	1–0	0–1		5–0	3–1	1–1	4–2	4–1	2–0	4–2	3–0	2–0	0–1	3–0	2–0	2–0
Kolos Kovalivka	2–0	0–2	1–1		0–3	1–3	1–1	2–0	0–0	0–0	0–0	0–1	0–2	2–0	0–0	0–1
Kryvbas Kryvyi Rih	1–0	3–0	0–2	1–0		2–0	3–0	3–0	1–0	2–1	0–1	1–3	3–3	2–1	1–1	2–2
LNZ Cherkasy	0–2	1–1	2–4	1–1	0–3		0–1	1–2	3–0	0–0	1–2	2–1	0–3	1–0	1–0	2–1
Metalist 1925 Kharkiv	2–1	1–1	2–4	0–0	1–3	1–1		1–0	1–1	0–3	3–3	1–4	1–2	1–2	3–2	2–1
Mynai	2–0	1–1	1–3	3–2	0–1	0–3	2–0		0–1	2–2	2–3	1–1	1–4	0–0	0–0	1–1
Obolon Kyiv	1–1	0–1	2–4	0–0	0–0	1–0	1–0	1–1		0–3	1–0	0–0	0–3	0–0	0–1	2–4
Oleksandriya	1–5	1–0	0–1	0–1	1–0	1–2	1–0	1–1	2–2		0–3	2–2	0–3 (Note: The match that originally ended in 0:0 draw was changed to technical result due to an ineligible player for Oleksandriya.)	1–0	1–0	0–0
Polissia Zhytomyr	1–4	1–1	3–2	1–0	1–1	0–1	2–1	2–1	2–0	1–2		0–1	2–0	1–1	1–0	1–1
Rukh Lviv	2–0	0–2	1–2	1–1	1–1	1–0	1–1	0–0	2–2	0–0	1–1		1–1	3–1	4–1	2–1
Shakhtar Donetsk	3–0	1–3	1–0	3–2	5–2	3–0	2–0	2–0	1–0	2–1	0–0	3–1		2–0	1–2	2–1
Veres Rivne	3–1	1–1	1–1	0–2	0–2	0–0	4–3	3–1	3–0	2–2	0–2	2–5	1–1		1–2	2–2
Vorskla Poltava	2–1	2–3	1–5	0–2	1–4	0–0	2–2	2–2	3–1	1–0	0–3	1–1	0–1	2–1		1–2
Zorya Luhansk	1–0	0–1	0–3	0–1	1–3	1–2	2–1	2–0	0–0	0–0	0–1	0–0	1–3	1–1	1–0	

Source: UPL calendar
Legend: Blue = home team win; Yellow = draw; Red = away team win.
For upcoming matches, an "a" indicates there is an article about the rivalry between the two participants.

=== Matches affected by air alerts ===
Round 1.
Veres vs Polissia. The match had been interrupted in the 89th minute for 30 minutes.
Oleksandriya vs Kryvbas. Kick off time was delayed for 30 minutes.
Round 2.
Oleksandriya vs Metalist 1925. Kick off time was delayed for 75 minutes.
Round 3.
Kryvbas vs LNZ. Kick off time was delayed for 45 minutes.
Round 4.
Kryvbas vs Shakhtar. Kick off time was delayed for 10 minutes.
Round 9.
Kryvbas vs Rukh. Kick off time was delayed for 30 minutes.
Round 10.
Dnipro-1 vs Veres. Kick off time was delayed for 15 minutes.
LNZ vs Oleksandriya. Kick off time was delayed for 75 minutes.
Round 12.
Kryvbas vs Dnipro-1. Kick off time was delayed for 80 minutes.
Round 13.
LNZ vs Kolos. Kick off time was delayed for 170 minutes.
Polissia vs Kryvbas. The match had been interrupted in the 4th minute for almost 2 hours.
Dnipro-1 vs Oleksandriya. Kick off time was delayed for 17 minutes. The match had been interrupted three times (in 57th, 69th, 90th minute).
Round 14.
Kolos vs Mynai. The match had been interrupted in the 43rd minute for 3 minutes.
Polissia vs Metalist 1925. Kick off time was delayed for 80 minutes.
Obolon vs Vorskla. Kick off time was delayed for 195 minutes.
Kryvbas vs Dynamo. Kick off time was delayed for 40 minutes.
Round 15.
Kolos vs Zorya. Kick off time was delayed for 35 minutes.
Round 16.
Kolos vs Obolon. Kick off time was delayed for 120 minutes.
Chornomorets vs LNZ. Kick off time was delayed for 30 minutes.
Mynai vs Dynamo. The match, which kicked off on 3 December 2023 at the Mynai Arena, has been interrupted in the 2nd minute, then resumed on 17 April 2024 at the Lobanovskyi Dynamo Stadium.
Round 18.
Dnipro-1 vs Mynai. Kick off time was delayed for 40 minutes. The match had been interrupted twice (in the 14th, 27th minute).
Zorya vs Vorskla. Kick off time was delayed for 55 minutes.
Oleksandriya vs Shakhtar. Kick off time was delayed for 105 minutes. The match had been interrupted in the 78th minute.
Round 20.
Veres vs Dynamo. Kick off time was delayed for 40 minutes.
Dnipro-1 vs Rukh. Beginning of the second half was delayed for 30 minutes. The match had been interrupted twice (in the 66th, 78th minute).
Kryvbas vs Obolon. The match had been interrupted in the 54th minute for 15 minutes.
Round 21.
Chornomorets vs Veres. Beginning of the second half was delayed for 55 minutes.
Round 22.
Zorya vs Metalist 1925. Beginning of the second half was delayed for 35 minutes. The match had been interrupted in the 83rd minute.
Vorskla vs Dynamo. The match had been interrupted in the 36th minute for 144 minutes.
Kolos vs Dnipro-1. Kick off time was delayed for 35 minutes.
Round 23.
Mynai vs Polissia. The match had been interrupted in the 21st minute for 55 minutes.
Kryvbas vs Vorskla. Kick off time was delayed for 30 minutes.
Dnipro-1 vs Zorya. The match had been interrupted twice (in the 75th, 86th minute).
Round 24.
Oleksandriya vs Dynamo. The match had been interrupted twice (in the 33rd, 60th minute).
LNZ vs Veres. Beginning of the second half was delayed for 45 minutes.
Round 25.
Chornomorets vs Kryvbas. Beginning of the second half was delayed for 18 minutes.
Vorskla vs Kolos. Kick off time was delayed for 20 minutes.
Round 26.
Dnipro-1 vs Dynamo. The match had been interrupted in the 13th minute for 40 minutes.
Kryvbas vs Metalist 1925. Kick off time was delayed for 30 minutes.
Round 27.
Obolon vs LNZ. Kick off time was delayed for 18 minutes.
Dnipro-1 vs Kryvbas. Kick off time was delayed for 40 minutes. Beginning of the second half was delayed for 30 minutes. The match had been interrupted in the 79th minute.
Round 28.
Vorskla vs Mynai. The match had been interrupted in the 64th minute for 40 minutes.
Kryvbas vs Polissia. The match, which kicked off on 12 May 2024 (kick off time was delayed for 80 minutes), has been interrupted in the 38th minute, then resumed on 13 May 2024 (kick off time for resumption was delayed for 60 minutes; the match had been also interrupted in the 81st minute).
Kolos vs LNZ. Kick off time was delayed for 45 minutes.
Round 29.
Vorskla vs Obolon. The match had been interrupted twice (in the 18th, 34th minute).
Dnipro-1 vs Shakhtar. The match had been interrupted four times (in the 19th, 24th, 75th minute; then kick off time for 75th minute resumption was delayed for 22 minutes).

== Relegation play-offs ==
Teams that placed 13th and 14th in the 2023–24 Ukrainian Premier League play two-leg play-off with the third and fourth teams of the 2023–24 Ukrainian First League.

Team 1	Agg.	Team 2	1st leg	2nd leg
Epitsentr Kamianets-Podilskyi	2–4	Veres Rivne	1–1	1–3
Obolon Kyiv	2–1	Livyi Bereh Kyiv	1–0	1–1

=== First leg ===
29 May 2024
15:30

Epitsentr Kamianets-Podilskyi	1–1	Veres Rivne
Moroz 28'	Report	Hayduchyk 80'

Arena Livyi Bereh, Zolochivska rural hromada
Attendance: 1,170
Referee: Viktor Kopiyevskyi

29 May 2024
18:30 (Note: Kick off time was delayed for 30 minutes due to air alert.)

Obolon Kyiv	1–0	Livyi Bereh Kyiv
Moroz 53'	Report

Obolon Arena, Kyiv
Attendance: 1,200
Referee: Maksym Kozyriatskyi

=== Second leg ===
2 June 2024
17:00

Veres Rivne	3–1	Epitsentr Kamianets-Podilskyi
Hayduchyk 7', 45+4'; Sharay 45+2'	Report	Sten 89'

Avanhard Stadium, Rivne
Attendance: 3,789
Referee: Oleksiy Derevinskyi

Veres Rivne won 4–2 on aggregate and remained for the 2024–25 Ukrainian Premier League. Epitsentr Kamianets-Podilskyi returned to the 2024–25 Ukrainian First League. Due to withdrawal of Dnipro-1, Epitsentr was selected for the mini tournament.

2 June 2024
16:00

Livyi Bereh Kyiv	1–1	Obolon Kyiv
Sidnney 54'	Report	Krasnopir 65'

Arena Livyi Bereh, Zolochivska rural hromada
Attendance: 1,711
Referee: Mykola Balakin

Obolon Kyiv won 2–1 on aggregate and remained for the 2024–25 Ukrainian Premier League. Livyi Bereh Kyiv returned to the 2024–25 Ukrainian First League. Due to withdrawal of Dnipro-1, Livyi Bereh was selected for the mini tournament.

== Mini tournament ==
On 22 July 2024 the UAF executive committee approved that the club which will replace SC Dnipro-1 should be the winner of the transitional tournament, organization of which was awarded to the UPL. The draw of the tournament was scheduled for the same date. The tournament was decided to include three games (two semifinals and a final) on 26 and 30 July 2024. The tournament was won by Livyi Bereh that gained promotion to the 2024–25 Ukrainian Premier League.

Semi-finals; 26 July 2024
1L	Livyi Bereh Kyiv (p)	1 (5)
PL	Metalist 1925 Kharkiv	1 (4)
1L	Epitsentr Kamianets-Podilskyi	3 (3)
PL	FC Mynai (p)	3 (5)

Final; 30 July 2024
1L	Livyi Bereh Kyiv	3
PL	FC Mynai	0

=== Semi-finals ===
Team 1	Score	Team 2
Livyi Bereh Kyiv	1–1 (5–4 p)	Metalist 1925 Kharkiv
Epitsentr Kamianets-Podilskyi	3–3 (3–5 p)	FC Mynai

26 July 2024
15:30 UTC+3

Livyi Bereh Kyiv	1–1 (a.e.t.)	Metalist 1925 Kharkiv
Voytsekhovskyi 45+1'	Report	Kravets 90+5'
Penalties
Spivakov (penalty scored); Kolesnyk (penalty scored); Sidney (penalty scored); Dedukh (penalty scored); Sokolov (penalty scored)	5–4	Boryachuk (penalty scored); Panchenko (penalty scored); Kravets (penalty scored); Sydorov (penalty scored); Moura (penalty missed)

Livyi Bereh Arena, Zolocha community
Attendance: 1,280
Referee: Andriy Kovalenko, Poltava

26 July 2024
18:00 UTC+3

Epitsentr Kamianets-Podilskyi	3–3 (a.e.t.)	FC Mynai
Myronyuk 12'; Bendera 66'; Kravchuk 77'	Report	Vakula 19'; Prikhna 57'; Remenyak 87'
Penalties
Zaporozhets (penalty scored); Ravlyk (penalty missed); Kravchuk (penalty scored); Klymets (penalty scored)	3–5	Demydenko (penalty scored); Remenyak (penalty scored); Dmytruk (penalty scored); Korablin (penalty scored); Kysil (penalty scored)

Avanhard, Rivne
Attendance: 310
Referee: Oleksandr Omelchenko, Slovyansk

=== Final ===
Team 1	Score	Team 2
Livyi Bereh Kyiv	3–0	FC Mynai

30 July 2024
18:00 UTC+3

Livyi Bereh Kyiv	3–0	FC Mynai
Sukhoruchko 20'; Synytsya 29'; M.Kohut 65'; Spivakov (yellow card) 89' (yellow-red card) 90+2'	Report

Avanhard, Rivne
Attendance: 300
Referee: Oleksandr Shandor, Lviv

Livyi Bereh Kyiv won the Mini tournament by beating in its final game Mynai, thus gaining promotion in place of SC Dnipro-1. Epitsentr Kamianets-Podilskyi remained in the Ukrainian First League, while Mynai and Metalist 1925 Kharkiv both were relegated to the Ukrainian First League.

== Season statistics ==
=== Top goalscorers ===
As of 25 May 2024

Rank	Scorer	Team	Goals (Pen.)
1	(Ukraine) Vladyslav Vanat	Dynamo Kyiv	14 (2)
2	(Ukraine) Danylo Sikan	Shakhtar Donetsk	10 (0)
2	(Ukraine) Vitaliy Buyalskyi	Dynamo Kyiv	10 (3)
4	(Ukraine) Oleksandr Filippov	Dnipro-1	9 (0)
4	(Panama) Eduardo Guerrero	Zorya Luhansk	9 (0)
4	(Ukraine) Oleksiy Hutsulyak	Dnipro-1	9 (0)
4	(Ukraine) Oleh Kozhushko	Kryvbas Kryvyi Rih	8 (0)
8	(Ukraine) Illya Kvasnytsya	Rukh Lviv	8 (0)
8	(Ukraine) Andriy Shtohrin	Chornomorets Odesa	8 (0)
8	(Ukraine) Andriy Yarmolenko	Dynamo Kyiv	8 (2)

=== Clean sheets ===
As of 25 May 2024

Rank	Player	Club	Clean sheets
1	(Ukraine) Dmytro Riznyk	Shakhtar Donetsk	13
2	(Ukraine) Kiril Fesyun	Kolos Kovalivka	12
3	(Ukraine) Heorhiy Bushchan	Dynamo Kyiv	11
4	(Ukraine) Andriy Klishchuk	Kryvbas Kryvyi Rih	10
4	(Ukraine) Mykyta Shevchenko	Oleksandriya	10
6	(Ukraine) Dmytro Ledviy	Rukh Lviv	9
6	(Ukraine) Yevhen Volynets	Dnipro-1	9
8	(Ukraine) Denys Boyko	Polissya Zhytomyr	7
8	(Ukraine) Herman Penkov	LNZ Cherkasy	7
10	(Ukraine) Pavlo Isenko	Vorskla Poltava	6
10	(Ukraine) Oleksandr Saputin	Zorya Luhansk	6

== Awards ==
=== Monthly awards ===
Month	Player of the Month		Coach of the Month		Ref.
Month	Player	Club	Coach	Club	Ref.
July—August 2023	(Cameroon) Yvan Dibango	Kryvbas Kryvyi Rih	(Ukraine) Roman Hryhorchuk	Chornomorets Odesa	
September 2023	(Ukraine) Maksym Zaderaka	Kryvbas Kryvyi Rih	(Ukraine) Yuriy Vernydub	Kryvbas Kryvyi Rih	
October 2023	(Republic of the Congo) Béni Makouana	Polissia Zhytomyr	(Ukraine) Yuriy Kalitvintsev	Polissia Zhytomyr	
November 2023	(Ukraine) Volodymyr Brazhko	Dynamo Kyiv	(Ukraine) Oleksandr Shovkovskyi	Dynamo Kyiv	
December 2023 / February 2024	(Ukraine) Vladyslav Vanat	Dynamo Kyiv	(Ukraine) Oleksandr Shovkovskyi	Dynamo Kyiv	
March 2024	(Ukraine) Vladyslav Vanat	Dynamo Kyiv	(Ukraine) Oleksandr Shovkovskyi	Dynamo Kyiv	
April 2024	(Ukraine) Danylo Sikan	Shakhtar Donetsk	(Ukraine) Oleksandr Shovkovskyi	Dynamo Kyiv	
May 2024	(Venezuela) Luifer Hernández	Polissia Zhytomyr	(Ukraine) Serhiy Shyshchenko	Polissia Zhytomyr	

=== Round awards ===
Round	Player			Coach		
Round	Player	Club	Reference	Coach	Club	Reference
Round 1	(Ukraine) Vladyslav Vanat	Dynamo Kyiv		(Romania) Mircea Lucescu	Dynamo Kyiv	
Round 2	(Ukraine) Yuriy Klymchuk	Rukh Lviv		(Ukraine) Oleksandr Kovpak	LNZ Cherkasy	
Round 3	(Ukraine) Oleksandr Bandura	FC Mynai		(Ukraine) Vitaliy Ponomaryov	Rukh Lviv	
Round 4	(Ukraine) Dmytro Kryskiv	Shakhtar Donetsk		(Ukraine) Roman Hryhorchuk	Chornomorets Odesa	
Round 5	(Ukraine) Oleksandr Nazarenko	Polissia Zhytomyr		(Ukraine) Yuriy Kalitvintsev	Polissia Zhytomyr	
Round 6	(Ukraine) Maksym Zaderaka	Kryvbas Kryvyi Rih		(Ukraine) Yuriy Vernydub	Kryvbas Kryvyi Rih	
Round 7	(Ukraine) Vladyslav Vanat	Dynamo Kyiv		(Ukraine) Yuriy Vernydub	Kryvbas Kryvyi Rih	
Round 8	(Ukraine) Volodymyr Brazhko	Dynamo Kyiv		(Ukraine) Yuriy Vernydub	Kryvbas Kryvyi Rih	
Round 9	(Ukraine) Volodymyr Brazhko	Dynamo Kyiv		(Romania) Mircea Lucescu	Dynamo Kyiv	
Round 10	(Ukraine) Vitaliy Buyalskyi	Dynamo Kyiv		(Ukraine) Yuriy Kalitvintsev	Polissia Zhytomyr	
Round 11	(Ukraine) Oleksandr Pikhalyonok	SC Dnipro-1		(Croatia) Darijo Srna	Shakhtar Donetsk	
Round 12	(Republic of the Congo) Béni Makouana	Polissya Zhytomyr		(Ukraine) Yuriy Vernydub	Kryvbas Kryvyi Rih	
Round 13	(Ukraine) Oleksandr Zubkov	Shakhtar Donetsk		(Bosnia and Herzegovina) Marino Pušić	Shakhtar Donetsk	
Round 14	(Ukraine) Vladyslav Vanat	Dynamo Kyiv		(Ukraine) Yuriy Maksymov	SC Dnipro-1	
Round 15	(Ukraine) Denys Boyko	Polissya Zhytomyr		(Ukraine) Oleksandr Shovkovskyi	Dynamo Kyiv	
Round 16	(Ukraine) Oleksandr Zubkov	Shakhtar Donetsk		(Bosnia and Herzegovina) Marino Pušić	Shakhtar Donetsk	
Round 17	(Ukraine) Oleksandr Zubkov	Shakhtar Donetsk		(Ukraine) Oleksandr Shovkovskyi	Dynamo Kyiv	
winter break
Round 18	(Ukraine) Vladyslav Vanat	Dynamo Kyiv		(Ukraine) Oleksandr Shovkovskyi	Dynamo Kyiv	
Round 19	(Ukraine) Dmytro Kryskiv	Shakhtar Donetsk		(Bosnia and Herzegovina) Marino Pušić	Shakhtar Donetsk	
Round 20	(Brazil) Kevin	Shakhtar Donetsk		(Ukraine) Ruslan Rotan	Oleksandriya	
Round 21	(Ukraine) Illya Kvasnytsya	Rukh Lviv		(Ukraine) Oleh Shandruk	Veres Rivne	
Round 22	(Ukraine) Artur Avahimyan	Chornomorets Odesa		(Ukraine) Oleksandr Shovkovskyi	Dynamo Kyiv	
Round 23	(Ukraine) Artem Bondarenko	Shakhtar Donetsk		(Bosnia and Herzegovina) Marino Pušić	Shakhtar Donetsk	
Round 24	(Ukraine) Volodymyr Brazhko	Dynamo Kyiv		(Ukraine) Oleksandr Shovkovskyi	Dynamo Kyiv	
Round 25	(Ukraine) Mykola Shaparenko	Dynamo Kyiv		(Ukraine) Oleksandr Shovkovskyi	Dynamo Kyiv	
Round 26	(Ukraine) Vladyslav Vanat	Dynamo Kyiv		(Ukraine) Oleksandr Shovkovskyi	Dynamo Kyiv	
Round 27	(Ukraine) Andriy Yarmolenko	Dynamo Kyiv		(Ukraine) Oleh Shandruk	Veres Rivne	
Round 28	(Ukraine) Heorhiy Sudakov	Shakhtar Donetsk		(Serbia) Željko Ljubenović	FC Mynai	
Round 29	(Brazil) Ari Moura	Metalist 1925 Kharkiv		(Serbia) Željko Ljubenović	FC Mynai	
Round 30	(Venezuela) Luifer Hernández	Polissya Zhytomyr		(Ukraine) Serhiy Shyshchenko (caretaker)	Polissya Zhytomyr	

== See also ==
- 2023–24 Ukrainian Cup
- 2023–24 Ukrainian First League
- 2023–24 Ukrainian Second League
- 2023–24 Ukrainian Football Amateur League
- 2023–24 Ukrainian Women's League
- List of Ukrainian football transfers summer 2023
- List of Ukrainian football transfers winter 2023–24
