= Marino Pušić =

Bosnia and Herzegovina football manager

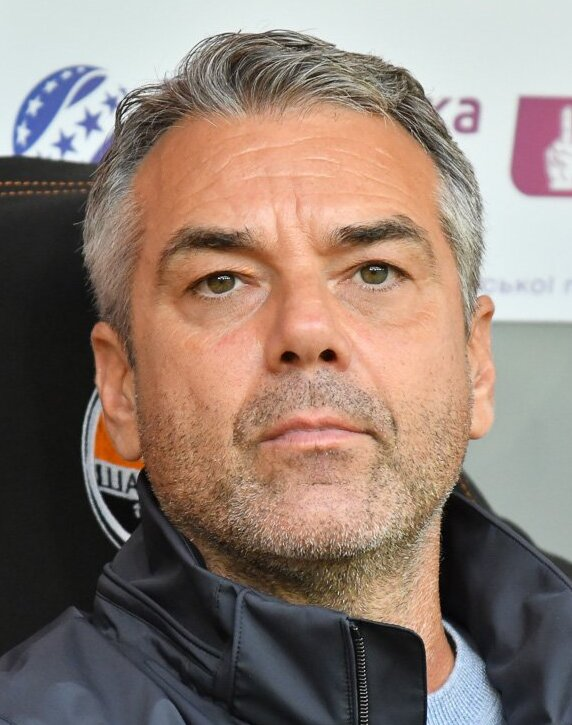
- Pušić as manager of Shakhtar Donetsk in 2024

Personal information
- Full name: Marino Pušić
- Date of birth: 18 August 1971 (age 55)
- Place of birth: Mostar, SR Bosnia and Herzegovina, Yugoslavia
- Position: Midfielder

Team information
- Current team: Al-Ahli (head coach)

Youth career
- Red Star Belgrade
- –1989: Velež Mostar

Senior career*
Years	Team	Apps	(Gls)
1989–1990	De Graafschap	0	(0)
1990–1991	Red Star Belgrade	0	(0)
1991–1992	Velež Mostar		
1992–1993	De Graafschap	0	(0)
1993–1994	Rheden		
1994–1995	1. FC Köln II		
1995–1996	Eupen	6	(0)
1996–2000	Babberich		
2000–2001	De Treffers		
2001–200?	Doc Shop (futsal)		
200?–200?	LZV (futsal)		

Managerial career
- 2017: Twente (interim)
- 2018–2019: Twente
- 2023–2025: Shakhtar Donetsk
- 2025–2026: Al Jazira
- 2026–: Al-Ahli
- * Club domestic league appearances and goals

Marino Pušić (born 18 August 1971) is a Croatian-Dutch football manager and former player who played as a midfielder. Besides football, he was also a player and a manager in competitive futsal. He is currently the head coach of Saudi Pro League club Al-Ahli.

== Playing career ==
=== Club ===
As a player, Pušić played for De Graafschap, VV Rheden, 1. FC Köln II, and KAS Eupen.

He was part of the Red Star Belgrade squad that won the 1990–91 European Cup, but was still too young to feature in any of their games. After fleeing the Yugoslav Wars for the Netherlands he rejected a move to Croatia Zagreb in 1999 when he played for Dutch Hoofdklasse side Babberich. Pušić later became a club legend at Babberich, when he scored both goals in the 1996 Dutch Amateur Cup final against SHO in De Kuip.

== Managerial career ==
Pušić was a trainer in the Vitesse/AGOVV Football Academy and assistant manager of Nebojša Gudelj at NAC Breda, of Kakhaber Tskhadadze at Inter Baku and of René Hake and Gertjan Verbeek at FC Twente.

=== FC Twente ===
On 18 October 2017, Pušić was appointed interim manager at FC Twente after his predecessor René Hake was forced to leave. On 29 October 2017, Gertjan Verbeek was appointed as the new manager, after which Pušić was demoted back to his role as assistant manager. On 26 March 2018, he was promoted to the interim manager position again, as Verbeek was fired. As interim head coach, Pušić failed to save FC Twente's season and the club finished last in the Eredivisie and was relegated to the Eerste Divisie. For 2018–19 season, Pušić was promoted to head coach.

After finishing in first place and becoming the champions of the Eerste Divisie, and securing promotion back to the Eredivisie, Pušić was sacked on 7 May 2019. He was then recruited to become the assistant manager for AZ Alkmaar in May 2019.

=== Feyenoord ===
In January 2021, Feyenoord announced signing of Pušić as assistant-manager, starting in the summer of 2021. As manager Arne Slot was previously transferred by AZ Alkmaar for having discussions about a role with Feyenoord, Pušić was transferred by AZ Alkmaar also.

=== Shakhtar Donetsk ===
On 24 October 2023, Pušić left Feyenoord to become the new head coach of Ukraine club Shakhtar Donetsk. On 11 May 2024, he guided the club to their 15th league title in the 2023–24 season, following a 1–0 victory over second-placed Dynamo Kyiv. He left the club by the end of the 2024–25 season.

=== Al Jazira ===
On 9 September 2025, Pušić became the head coach of UAE Pro League club Al Jazira.

=== Al-Ahli ===
On 6 August 2026, Pušić was appointed as head coach of Saudi Pro League club Al-Ahli, signing a two-year contract.

== Managerial statistics ==
As of match played 20 November 2026

Team	Nat	From	To	Record							
Team	Nat	From	To	G	W	D	L	GF	GA	GD	Win %
FC Twente	(Netherlands)	18 October 2017	30 October 2017	3	2	0	1	7	3	+4	66.67
FC Twente	(Netherlands)	26 March 2018	6 May 2019	48	29	7	12	87	55	+32	60.42
Shakhtar Donetsk	(Ukraine)	24 October 2023	24 May 2025	71	44	13	14	142	71	+71	61.97
Al Jazira	(United Arab Emirates)	9 September 2025	30 June 2026	31	16	6	9	51	37	+14	51.61
Al-Ahli	(Saudi Arabia)	6 August 2026	Present	19	12	2	5	41	26	+15	63.16
Total				172	103	28	41	328	192	+136	59.88

== Honours ==
=== Manager ===
FC Twente

- Eerste Divisie: 2018–19

Shakhtar Donetsk

- Ukrainian Premier League: 2023–24
- Ukrainian Cup: 2023–24, 2024–25

=== Assistant manager ===
Feyenoord

- Eredivisie: 2022–23
