= Oleksiy Khomenko =

Ukrainian footballer

Personal information
- Full name: Oleksiy Volodymyrovych Khomenko
- Date of birth: 28 August 1994 (age 32)
- Place of birth: Ukraine
- Height: 1.76 m (5 ft 9 1/2 in)
- Position: Midfielder

Team information
- Current team: FC Munkach Mukachevo

Youth career
- 2007–2011: FC Molod Poltava

Senior career*
Years	Team	Apps	(Gls)
2012–2013	FC Volyn Lutsk	0	(0)
2013–2016	FC Hoverla Uzhhorod	4	(0)
2016–	FC Munkach Mukachevo (amateur)	15	(2)
- * Club domestic league appearances and goals as of 29 January 2017

Oleksiy Khomenko (Ukrainian: Олексій Володимирович Хоменко; born 28 August 1994) is a Ukrainian football midfielder who currently plays for amateur club FC Munkach Mukachevo.

Khomenko is a product of the FC Molod Poltava Youth Sportive School System. In 2013, he signed a contract with FC Hoverla, but played only in the FC Hoverla Uzhhorod reserves. In the main-team squad he made his debut playing as a substitute player in the match against FC Dynamo Kyiv on 16 April 2016 in the Ukrainian Premier League.
