= Dmytro Haponchuk =

Ukrainian footballer

Personal information
- Full name: Dmytro Serhiyovych Haponchuk
- Date of birth: 8 November 1995 (age 31)
- Place of birth: Ivano-Frankivsk, Ukraine
- Height: 1.85 m (6 ft 1 in)
- Position: Defender

Youth career
- 2008–2009: Prykarpattya Ivano-Frankivsk
- 2009–2010: Nika Ivano-Frankivsk
- 2010: Skala Morshyn
- 2011: Prykarpattya Ivano-Frankivsk
- 2011–2012: Volyn Lutsk

Senior career*
Years	Team	Apps	(Gls)
2012	MFK Nika-Teplovyk Ivano-Frankivsk (amateurs)	14	(6)
2013	Karpaty Yaremche (amateurs)	19	(0)
2014–2016	Metalurh Zaporizhzhia	3	(0)
2016–2017	Teplovyk Ivano-Frankivsk	20	(0)
2017	Prydnistrovya Tlumach (amateurs)	?	(?)
2018	Nyva Ternopil	7	(0)
2018	Veres Rivne	5	(0)
- * Club domestic league appearances and goals as of 18 March 2019

Dmytro Haponchuk (Ukrainian: Дмитро Сергійович Гапончук; born 8 November 1995) is a Ukrainian football defender.

Haponchuk is a product of different youth team system, but began from FC Prykarpattya Ivano-Frankivsk. His first trainer was Viktor Poptanych.

Made his debut for FC Metalurh in the match against FC Zorya Luhansk on 7 November 2015 in the Ukrainian Premier League.
