= Mykola Hayduchyk =

Ukrainian footballer

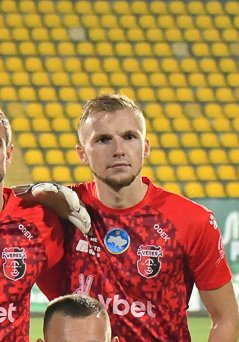

Personal information
- Full name: Mykola Mykhaylovych Hayduchyk
- Date of birth: 30 December 1999 (age 26)
- Place of birth: Zdolbuniv, Ukraine
- Height: 1.88 m (6 ft 2 in)
- Position: Forward

Team information
- Current team: Polissya Zhytomyr
- Number: 89

Youth career
- 2016: DYuSSh Berezne
- 2016–2017: Veres Rivne

Senior career*
| Years | Team | Apps | (Gls) |
| 2017 | Veres Rivne | 0 | (0) |
| 2018–2019 | Malynsk | 74 | (36) |
| 2020 | ODEK Orzhiv | 26 | (27) |
| 2021–2025 | Veres Rivne | 102 | (14) |
| 2021 | → Uzhhorod (loan) | 16 | (5) |
| 2025– | Polissya Zhytomyr | 30 | (9) |
- * Club domestic league appearances and goals as of 3 June 2026

Mykola Mykhaylovych Hayduchyk (Ukrainian: Микола Михайлович Гайдучик; born 30 December 1999) is a Ukrainian professional footballer who plays as a forward for Ukrainian club Polissya Zhytomyr.

== Club career ==
Hayduchyk is a product of DYuSSh Berezne, Veres Rivne, and Lviv youth sportive school systems.

In spring 2018, he moved to Malynsk, where he played in the Rivne Oblast Championship and the Ukrainian Amateur League. In the 2019 and 2020 seasons, he was the best goalscorer of the Rivne Oblast championship. In 2020, he played for ODEK Orzhiv in the Rivne Oblast championship and in the Ukrainian Amateur League.

In January 2021, he went back to Veres Rivne for a trial, as a result of which he signed a contract with the club. He made his Veres debut on 3 March 2021, in a home defeat in the quarter-finals of the 2020–21 Ukrainian Cup against Zorya Luhansk. Mykola came on in the 83rd minute, replacing Robert Hehedosh.
