= Oleksandr Shovkovskyi =

Ukrainian footballer

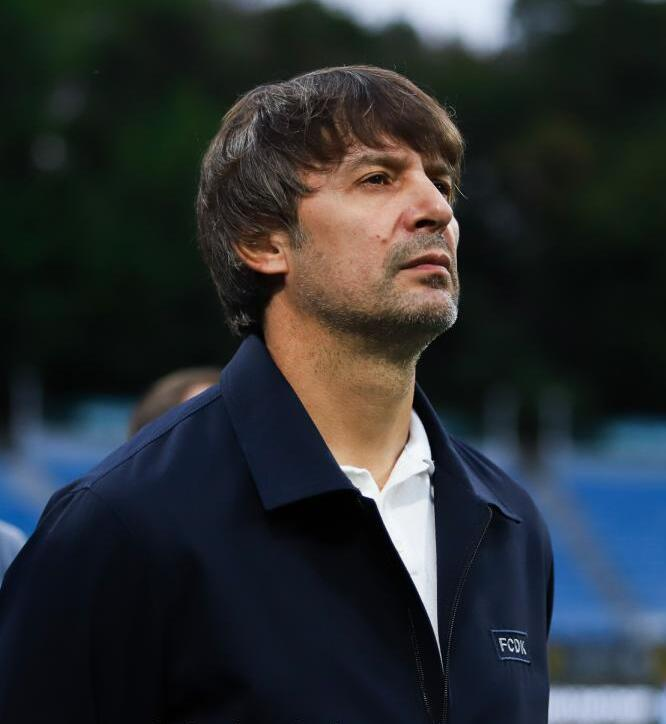
- Shovkovskyi managing Dynamo Kyiv in 2024

Personal information
- Full name: Oleksandr Volodymyrovych Shovkovskyi
- Date of birth: 2 January 1975 (age 51)
- Place of birth: Kyiv, Ukrainian SSR, Soviet Union
- Height: 1.91 m (6 ft 3 in)
- Position: Goalkeeper

Youth career
- 1986–1993: Dynamo Kyiv

Senior career*
Years	Team	Apps	(Gls)
1992–2016	Dynamo Kyiv	426	(0)
1992–1993	→ Dynamo-3 Kyiv	16	(0)
1993–2006	→ Dynamo-2 Kyiv	31	(0)
1993	→ CSK ZSU Kyiv (loan)	2	(0)
Total		475	(0)

International career
1993–1997	Ukraine U21	12	(0)
1994–2012	Ukraine	92	(0)

Managerial career
- 2023–2025: Dynamo Kyiv
- * Club domestic league appearances and goals

Oleksandr Volodymyrovych Shovkovskyi (Ukrainian: Олекса́ндр Володи́мирович Шовко́вський; born 2 January 1975) is a Ukrainian professional football manager and former player who played as a goalkeeper. He was most recently in charge of Ukrainian Premier League club Dynamo Kyiv.

He played for Dynamo Kyiv in the Ukrainian Premier League, the top level of Ukrainian football, from 1993 to 2016. In the 2020 Kyiv local election, Shovkovskyi was elected into the Kyiv City Council, as candidate of UDAR (the party of incumbent Kyiv Mayor Vitaliy Klychko).

== Club career ==
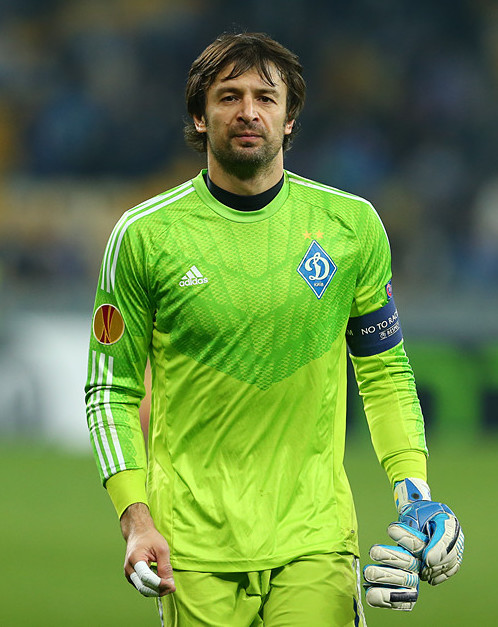
Shovkovskyi with Dynamo Kyiv in 2015

Born in Kyiv, Ukraine, Shovkovskyi is a graduate of the Dynamo Kyiv football academy. Since his teenage years and up until now he has played for only one club. In fact, he has more caps for the club than anybody else in the history of Dynamo. After advancing from one age group youth team to another, the talented young goalkeeper made his way to the first squad of the Ukrainian giants Dynamo where he made his debut in a league fixture in 1993. By next year he was already called up to the Ukraine national football team. Throughout the majority of his career he was the first choice goalkeeper for Dynamo, except for a few brief periods caused by injuries. The goalkeeper's fame came to him as he became notorious for saving penalties, which made him popular in the media and among fans. By the end of 2009 his goals against average in the League was .632 with over 300 games played.

In the summer of 2011, Shovkovskyi played his 100th match in the Champions League (against Rubin Kazan in Kazan). Shovkovskyi has played 121 matches in European cups, keeping 33 clean-sheets; 109 of these appearances have come in the UEFA Champions League (77, excluding qualifiers), in which he has kept 28 clean sheets (16, excluding qualifiers).

On 13 December 2016, Shovkovskyi announced his retirement at the age of 41.

== International career ==
Shovkovskyi is well known for his blunder during the UEFA Euro 2000 play-off game where the Ukraine national team faced Slovenia. In the 83rd minute of the first leg in Ljubljana, Shovkovskyi came out of his goal almost to the corner flag to kick the ball away, but scuffed his kick to Milenko Ačimovič who scored into the empty net from 40 meters out. Ukraine lost this match 2–1 and drew the second leg 1–1 and hence did not qualify for Euro 2000 in Netherlands/Belgium.

Shovkovskyi was the first-choice keeper for Ukraine at the 2006 FIFA World Cup. Notably, he saved two spot kicks from Marco Streller and Ricardo Cabanas in the penalty shootout against Switzerland in their second-round match, which sent Ukraine through to the quarterfinals, becoming the first goalkeeper in FIFA World Cup history not to concede a goal during penalty shootout (Tranquillo Barnetta also hit the bar); Shovkovskyi was subsequently awarded the man of the match award. Also more recently Oleksandr was voted player of the tournament in early 2008, in a Channel One Cup in Israel, which was won by Dynamo in a notorious game against the club's top rival Shakhtar Donetsk. During this game in a series of penalty kicks, Oleksandr Shovkovskyi saved 3 kicks and almost single-handedly won the match. His goals against average for the national team is .86 with a bit short of 100 games mark on his count (92).

In September 2012, Shovkovskyi announced his retirement from the Ukraine national team.

Until 2013 Shovkovskyi held the record for the Ukraine national team of minutes played without a goal, 728 minutes, but it was beaten by Andriy Pyatov.

Four years after his retirement from the game, Shovkovskyi, as an assistant to national team coach Andriy Shevchenko and aged 45, was listed as a back-up goalkeeper for Ukraine for a friendly match away to France on 7 October 2020 after three of the four goalkeepers in the squad tested positive for COVID-19.

== Political views and career ==
Shovkovskyi got a lot of media attention when giving an interview about the Euromaidan situation. When commenting on the number of people killed, he mentioned how his grandfather started every toast saying "For not having any wars", after which he couldn't hold his tears. Before a Europa League game against Valencia, Shovkovskyi sent a request to UEFA to start the games of the Ukrainian clubs from a moment of silence, a request that was granted.

Shovkovskyi is a supporter of the Euromaidan movement, and said he wants to live by "European values and not by Soviet values". When questioned about the Euromaidan, he said that for him it started on November 29-30, 2013, when students were beaten, and considering that his son was a student and could have been among those students, it made him upset. As the protests developed, he stopped watching Russian television due to manipulations. However, he criticized the decision of the new government to take away the status of Russian language as a second language in regions where the Russian language was dominant.

Shovkovskyi was a Kyiv City Council candidate of UDAR (the party of incumbent Kyiv Mayor Vitaliy Klychko) in the 2020 Kyiv local election set for 25 October 2020. He was elected, together with 29 other representatives of his party.

In January 2023, he left his post as assistant coach of Ukraine national team, which he held since 2018.

== Career statistics ==
=== Club ===
Appearances and goals by club, season and competition
Club	Season	League		Cup		Europe		Super Cup		Total	
Club	Season	Apps	GA	Apps	GA	Apps	GA	Apps	GA	Apps	GA
Dynamo Kyiv	1993–94	9	6	—		—		—		9	6
Dynamo Kyiv	1994–95	25	15	2	1	8	12	—		35	28
Dynamo Kyiv	1995–96	25	13	4	0	3	1	—		32	14
Dynamo Kyiv	1996–97	24	14	2	1	3	6	—		29	21
Dynamo Kyiv	1997–98	26	13	7	4	12	14	—		45	31
Dynamo Kyiv	1998–99	24	14	6	4	13	13	—		43	31
Dynamo Kyiv	1999–2000	15	10	1	1	16	19	—		32	30
Dynamo Kyiv	2000–01	19	9	—		6	8	—		25	17
Dynamo Kyiv	2001–02	6	2	2	3	—		—		8	5
Dynamo Kyiv	2002–03	15	13	5	0	2	2	—		22	15
Dynamo Kyiv	2003–04	19	15	3	0	8	9	—		30	24
Dynamo Kyiv	2004–05	23	9	4	2	10	12	—		37	23
Dynamo Kyiv	2005–06	24	17	3	0	2	3	1	1	30	21
Dynamo Kyiv	2006–07	24	19	5	5	8	16	1	0	38	40
Dynamo Kyiv	2007–08	22	21	4	3	6	12	—		32	36
Dynamo Kyiv	2008–09	10	9	2	0	2	2	1	1	15	12
Dynamo Kyiv	2009–10	24	13	1	0	4	5	1	0	30	18
Dynamo Kyiv	2010–11	10	7	2	2	8	4	—		20	13
Dynamo Kyiv	2011–12	24	11	1	3	9	9	1	1	35	24
Dynamo Kyiv	2012–13	6	5	1	4	2	3	—		9	12
Dynamo Kyiv	2013–14	8	5	2	1	5	3	—		15	9
Dynamo Kyiv	2014–15	18	9	2	0	9	10	1	2	30	21
Dynamo Kyiv	2015–16	18	7	—		7	5	1	0	26	12
Dynamo Kyiv	2016–17	8	7	—		1	2	1	0	10	9
Total		426	263	59	34	144	170	8	5	637	440

=== International ===
Appearances and goals by national team and year
National team	Year	Apps	GA
Ukraine	1994	1	0
Ukraine	1995	0	0
Ukraine	1996	1	0
Ukraine	1997	9	7
Ukraine	1998	5	4
Ukraine	1999	9	5
Ukraine	2000	3	2
Ukraine	2001	6	2
Ukraine	2002	4	2
Ukraine	2003	8	7
Ukraine	2004	10	9
Ukraine	2005	8	4
Ukraine	2006	12	11
Ukraine	2007	7	9
Ukraine	2008	1	1
Ukraine	2009	2	5
Ukraine	2010	0	0
Ukraine	2011	5	3
Ukraine	2012	1	0
Total		92	71

=== Managerial ===
As of match played 27 November 2025

Managerial record by team and tenure
Team	From	To	Record							
Team	From	To	G	W	D	L	GF	GA	GD	Win %
Dynamo Kyiv	3 November 2023	27 November 2025	93	55	21	17	183	91	+92	59.14
Total			93	55	21	17	183	91	+92	59.14

== Honours ==
=== Player ===
Dynamo Kyiv

- Ukrainian Premier League (14): 1993–94, 1994–95, 1995–96, 1996–97, 1997–98, 1998–99, 1999–2000, 2000–01, 2002–03, 2003–04, 2006–07, 2008–09, 2014–15, 2015–16
- Ukrainian Cup (10): 1995–96, 1997–98, 1998–99, 1999–2000, 2002–03, 2004–05, 2005–06, 2006–07, 2013–14, 2014–15
- Ukrainian Super Cup (6): 2004, 2006, 2007, 2009, 2011, 2016
- CIS Cup: 1996, 1997, 1998, 2002
- Valeriy Lobanovskyi Memorial Tournament: 2003, 2004

Individual

- Ukrainian Footballer of the Year: 2nd place 2004–05 (by newspaper «Komanda»)
- Ukrainian goalkeeper of the Year (9): 1994, 1997–1999, 2003–2006, 2011 (by newspaper «Ukrayinskyi futbol»)
- UPL goalkeeper of the season: 2010–11, 2011–12
- independent Ukraine's history the best footballer, with Andriy Shevchenko and Anatoliy Tymoshchuk)
- 2000–2010 CIS the best goalkeeper (by soccer.ru)
- Ukrainian Footballer of the Year: 2nd place (1994), 3rd place (1999) (by newspaper «Ukrayinskyi futbol»)
- 1999 European Goalkeeper of the Year – 2nd place (Based on Ballon d'Or Ranking)
- 2006 FIFA World Cup round of 16 Switzerland vs Ukraine Man of the Match
- Shovkovskyi's save in match Rubin Kazan vs. Dynamo Kyiv – 2009–10 UEFA Champions League group stage fifth round Moment of the Round
- 2010–11 UEFA Europa League best goalkeeper

=== Manager ===
Dynamo Kyiv

- Ukrainian Premier League (1): 2024–25

Individual

- Ukrainian Premier League Coach of the Month: November 2023, December 2023/February 2024, March 2024
- SportArena Coach of the Round: 2025–26 (Round 4),
- Ukrainian Premier League Coach of the Round: 2025–26 (Round 4, Round 10),

Preceded by Svyatoslav Vakarchuk	Most beautiful by VIVA! 2006; With: Natalia Mohylevska	Succeeded by Savik Shuster
