= Myroslav Bon =

Ukrainian footballer

Personal information
- Full name: Myroslav Ivanovych Bon
- Date of birth: 16 February 1993 (age 33)
- Place of birth: Khust, Zakarpattia Oblast, Ukraine
- Height: 1.91 m (6 ft 3 in)
- Position: Goalkeeper

Youth career
- 2005–2006: FC Karpaty Khust
- 2006–2009: FC Dynamo Kyiv

Senior career*
Years	Team	Apps	(Gls)
2009–2015	FC Dynamo Kyiv	0	(0)
2009–2014	→FC Dynamo-2 Kyiv (loan)	4	(0)
2014–2015	→FC Hoverla Uzhhorod (loan)	0	(0)
2015–2017	FC Poltava	24	(0)

International career^{‡}
2009	Ukraine-16	4	(0)
- * Club domestic league appearances and goals as of 17 May 2017 ‡ National team caps and goals as of 17 May 2017

Myroslav Ivanovych Bon (Ukrainian: Мирослав Іванович Бонь; born 16 February 1993) is a Ukrainian former professional football goalkeeper.

Bon is a product of FC Dynamo Kyiv youth sportive system. He spent his career in the Ukrainian First League club FC Dynamo-2 Kyiv. And in July 2014 went on loan for FC Hoverla in the Ukrainian Premier League.

He retired from professional football playing, because of health issues in May 2017.
