= List of Ukrainian football transfers summer 2024 =

Ukrainian football transfers summer 2024

This is a list of Ukrainian football transfers summer 2024

== Ukrainian Premier League ==
=== Chornomorets Odesa ===
In:

No.	Pos.	Nation	Player
—	GK	UKR	Artur Rudko (from Shakhtar Donetsk)
—	MF	UKR	Denis Yanakov (from Zorya Luhansk)
—	DF	UKR	Bohdan Butko (from Polissya Zhytomyr)
—	DF	UKR	Bohdan Biloshevskyi (from FC Oleksandriya)
—	FW	UKR	Oleksiy Khoblenko (from LNZ Cherkasy)
—	DF	UKR	Borys Lototskyi (from LNZ Cherkasy)
—	DF	UKR	Danylo Udod (from Shakhtar Donetsk)
—	MF	UKR	Illya Shevtsov
—	MF	UKR	Artem Habelok (from Shakhtar Donetsk)
—	MF	UKR	Vladyslav Kalyn (from Dynamo Kyiv U19)
—	FW	UKR	Kiril Popov (from Kolos Kovalivka)
—	DF	UKR	Yaroslav Kysil (from FC Mynai)
—	DF	BRA	Caio Gomes (from (Brazil) Atlético Clube Paranavaí)
—	MF	BRA	João Neto (from (Portugal) Famalicão U23)
—	MF	UKR	Yevhen Yanovich (from Shakhtar Donetsk)
—	MF	UKR	Mykhaylo Khromey (from Shakhtar Donetsk)
—	MF	UKR	Ivan Petryak (from Shakhtar Donetsk)
—	MF	UKR	Kyrylo Siheyev (from Shakhtar Donetsk)
—	DF	GEO	Luka Latsabidze (from Shakhtar Donetsk)
—	GK	NGR	Chijioke Aniagboso (from Polissya Zhytomyr)
—	DF	GAM	Moses Jarju (from Polissya Zhytomyr)
—	DF	UKR	Yevheniy Skyba (from FC Mynai)

Out:

No.	Pos.	Nation	Player
—	FW	UKR	Samson Iyede (End Loan (Denmark) AC Horsens)
—	MF	UKR	Artur Avahimyan (to FC Oleksandriya)
—	FW	UKR	Maksym Braharu (to Dynamo Kyiv)
—	MF	UKR	Illya Putrya (to LNZ Cherkasy)
—	FW	UKR	Danylo Holub (to Bukovyna Chernivtsi)
—	FW	UKR	Bohdan Boychuk (to Bukovyna Chernivtsi)
—	MF	UKR	Orest Kuzyk (to Karpaty Lviv)
—	DF	UKR	Illya Ukhan (to FC Oleksandriya-2)
—	DF	BEL	Ziguy Badibanga (Released)
—	FW	ARG	Fabricio Alvarenga (Released)
—	DF	SLO	Luka Guček (to Vorskla Poltava)
—	MF	UKR	Vladyslav Ohirya (to Dinaz Vyshhorod)
—	GK	UKR	Oleh Bilyk (to Epitsentr Kamianets-Podilskyi)
—	FW	UKR	Andriy Shtohrin (to (Azerbaijan) Neftçi Baku)
—	MF	UKR	Yevhen Danylyuk (to Revera 1908 Ivano-Frankivsk)
—	DF	UKR	Volodymyr Salyuk (to Metalist 1925)
—	DF	UKR	Vladyslav Shapoval (to Livyi Bereh)
—	MF	UKR	Jack Ipalibo (to (Hungary) Zalaegerszegi TE)
—	GK	UKR	Danylo Varakuta (to Metalist 1925)

=== Dynamo Kyiv ===
In:

No.	Pos.	Nation	Player
—	MF	UKR	Maksym Braharu (from Chornomorets Odesa)
—	MF	UKR	Oleksandr Pikhalyonok (from Dnipro-1)
—	MF	UKR	Valentyn Rubchynskyi (from Dnipro-1)
—	MF	UKR	Aleksandre Peikrishvili (from (Georgia (country)) Dinamo Tbilisi)
—	FW	PAN	Eduardo Guerrero (from Zorya Luhansk)
—	DF	COL	Brayan Ceballos (Loan from (Brazil) Fortaleza)

Out:

No.	Pos.	Nation	Player
—	MF	JAM	Kaheem Parris (to (Azerbaijan) Sabah)
—	DF	POL	Tomasz Kędziora (to (Greece) PAOK)
—	MF	UKR	Mykyta Kravchenko (to Oleksandriya)
—	MF	MKD	Reshat Ramadani (loan to (North Macedonia) Shkëndija)
—	DF	UKR	Oleksandr Syrota (loan to (Israel) Maccabi Haifa)
—	MF	UKR	Serhiy Buletsa (loan to (Poland) Lechia Gdańsk)
—	MF	LUX	Gerson Rodrigues (loan to (China) Guangxi Pingguo Haliao)
—	FW	VEN	Eric Ramírez (loan to (Argentina) Tigre)
—	MF	GEO	Giorgi Tsitaishvili (loan to (Spain) Granada)
—	MF	UKR	Oleksiy Husyev (loan to Zorya Luhansk)
—	FW	NGR	Benito (loan to Zorya Luhansk)
—	MF	SUR	Justin Lonwijk (loan to (Denmark) Viborg)
—	FW	UKR	Vladyslav Supryaha (loan to Zorya Luhansk)
—	MF	GEO	Samba Diallo (loan to (Israel) Hapoel Jerusalem)

=== Karpaty Lviv ===
In:

No.	Pos.	Nation	Player
—	MF	UKR	Denys Ustymenko (loan to Kryvbas)
—	MF	BRA	Bruninho (loan to (Brazil) Atlético Mineiro)
—	MF	UKR	Orest Kuzyk (from Chornomorets Odesa)

Out:

No.	Pos.	Nation	Player
—	MF	UKR	Andriy Lomnytskyi (to Obolon Kyiv)
—	FW	UKR	Vadym Sydun (to Nyva Ternopil)
—	MF	UKR	Maksym Melnychenko (to Polissya Zhytomyr)
—	MF	UKR	Yehor Kartushov (to Dinaz Vyshhorod)

=== Kolos Kovalivka ===
In:

No.	Pos.	Nation	Player
—	MF	UKR	Eduard Kozik (Loan from Shakhtar Donetsk)
—	FW	VEN	Denys Ustymenko (Loan from (Spain) Albacete)

Out:

No.	Pos.	Nation	Player
—	MF	UKR	Andriy Totovytskyi (Loan return to Shakhtar Donetsk)
—	MF	UKR	Dmytro Topalov (Loan return to Shakhtar Donetsk)

=== Kryvbas Kryvyi Rih ===
In:

No.	Pos.	Nation	Player
—	MF	UKR	Denys Ustymenko (loan return from Karpaty Lviv)

Out:

No.	Pos.	Nation	Player
—	MF	UKR	Danylo Beskorovaynyi (to Polissya Zhytomyr)

=== Inhulets Petrove ===
In:

No.	Pos.	Nation	Player
—	MF	UKR	Oleh Osypenko (loan return from Chernihiv)

Out:

No.	Pos.	Nation	Player
—	MF	UKR	Anatoliy Romanchenko (Reliased)

=== Livyi Bereh Kyiv ===
In:

No.	Pos.	Nation	Player
—	MF	UKR	Vladyslav Shapoval (From Chornomorets Odesa)

Out:

No.	Pos.	Nation	Player
—	MF	UKR	Maksym Serdyuk (Loan to Chernihiv)

=== LNZ Cherkasy ===
In:

No.	Pos.	Nation	Player
—	MF	ISR	Osama Khalaila (from (Azerbaijan) Bnei Sakhnin)
—	MF	GEO	Shota Nonikashvili (from (Georgia (country)) Iberia 1999)
—	MF	UKR	Dmytro Topalov (Loan from Shakhtar Donetsk)
—	MF	UKR	Artur Avahimyan (From Oleksandriya)
—	FW	NIG	Francis Momoh (from (Switzerland) Grasshoppers U21)

Out:

No.	Pos.	Nation	Player
—	GK	UKR	Ivan Dubovyi (Loan to Trostianets)
—	MF	UKR	Maksym Pryadun (Reliased)

=== Obolon Kyiv ===
In:

No.	Pos.	Nation	Player
—	MF	UKR	Denys Teslyuk (from Rukh Lviv)

Out:

No.	Pos.	Nation	Player
—	MF	UKR	Ihor Krasnopir (to Rukh Lviv)

=== Oleksandriya ===
In:

No.	Pos.	Nation	Player
—	MF	UKR	Oleksandr Filippov (from Dnipro-1)
—	MF	UKR	Artem Kozak
—	MF	UKR	Artem Shabanov (from Polissya Zhytomyr)
—	MF	UKR	Mykyta Kravchenko (from Dynamo Kyiv)

Out:

No.	Pos.	Nation	Player
—	MF	UKR	Vladyslav Kalitvintsev (to Metalist 1925 Kharkiv)
—	MF	UKR	Artur Avahimyan (to LNZ Cherkasy)

=== Polissya Zhytomyr ===
In:

No.	Pos.	Nation	Player
—	GK	UKR	Yevhen Volynets (from Dnipro-1)
—	MF	UKR	Bohdan Lyednyev (from Dnipro-1)
—	MF	UKR	Oleksiy Hutsulyak (from Dnipro-1)
—	FW	UKR	Daniels Radzenieks (From (Denmark) Super Nova)
—	DF	UKR	Yaroslav Karaman (from Uzhhorod)
—	MF	UKR	Maksym Melnychenko (Loan from Karpaty Lviv)
—	MF	UKR	Eduard Sarapiy (from Dnipro-1)
—	MF	UKR	Sergiy Korniychuk (from Mynai)
—	FW	BRA	Paixão (Loan from (Brazil) Vasco da Gama)
—	FW	BIH	Admir Bristrić (Loan from (Slovenia) Olimpija Ljubljana)
—	DF	CRO	Matey Matich (from (Croatia) Lokomotiva Zagreb)
—	MF	GEO	Giorgi Maisuradze (from (Georgia (country)) Dinamo Tbilisi)
—	MF	BRA	João Vialle (from (Brazil) Ituano)
—	MF	UKR	Ruslan Babenko (from Dnipro-1)
—	MF	UKR	Danylo Beskorovaynyi (from Kryvbas Kryvyi Rih)
—	MF	MKD	Dimitar Traikov (from (North Macedonia) Brera Strumica)

Out:

No.	Pos.	Nation	Player
—	GK	UKR	Denys Boyko (Reliased)
—	MF	MKD	Dimitar Traikov (to Polissya-2 Zhytomyr)
—	FW	UKR	Pylyp Budkivskyi (Reliased)
—	MF	UKR	Artem Kozak (Reliased)
—	GK	NGR	Chijioke Aniagboso (to Chornomorets Odesa)
—	DF	GAM	Moses Jarju (to Chornomorets Odesa)
—	MF	UKR	Denis Yanakov (to Chornomorets Odesa)
—	MF	UKR	Denys Ndukve (to Vorskla Poltava)
—	MF	UKR	Yevheniy Morozko (to Veres Rivne)
—	MF	UKR	Vasyl Kravets (to Metalist 1925 Kharkiv)
—	MF	UKR	Artem Shabanov (to Oleksandriya)
—	MF	UKR	Vasyl Hrytsuk (Loan to Zviahel)
—	MF	UKR	Vasyl Hrytsuk (Loan to Zviahel)
—	MF	UKR	Denis Yanakov (Loan to Chornomorets Odesa)

=== Rukh Lviv ===
In:

No.	Pos.	Nation	Player
—	DF	UKR	Oleh Veremiyenko (from FC Podillya Khmelnytskyi)
—	MF	UKR	Volodymyr Rudyuk (loan return Prykarpattia Ivano-Frankivsk)
—	MF	SEN	Djibril Diaw (loan return (France) Stade Lavallois)
—	MF	UKR	Ihor Krasnopir (from FC Obolon Kyiv)

Out:

No.	Pos.	Nation	Player
—	MF	UKR	Denys Teslyuk (to FC Obolon Kyiv)

=== Shakhtar Donetsk ===
In:

No.	Pos.	Nation	Player
—	GK	UKR	Kiril Fesyun (from Kolos Kovalivka)
—	DF	TUN	Alaa Ghram (from (Tunisia) CS Sfaxien)
—	DF	CRO	Bartol Franjić (from (Germany) VfL Wolfsburg)
—	MF	UKR	Andriy Totovytskyi (Loan return from Kolos Kovalivka)

Out:

No.	Pos.	Nation	Player
—	DF	ECU	Denil Castillo (to (Denmark) Midtjylland)
—	DF	BRA	Marlon (to (United Arab Emirates) Al Ain)
—	DF	UKR	Oleksandr Drambayev (to Kryvbas Kryvyi Rih)
—	DF	UKR	Andriy Buleza (to Karpaty Lviv)
—	DF	UKR	Yaroslav Rakitskyi (Released)
—	DF	UKR	Viktor Korniyenko (Loan to Vorskla Poltava)
—	MF	TJK	Khusrav Toirov (Loan to (Kazakhstan) Atyrau)
—	FW	VEN	Kevin Kelsy (Loan to Vorskla Poltava)
—	FW	UKR	Viktor Korniyenko (Loan to Vorskla Poltava)
—	DF	GEO	Giorgi Gocholeishvili (Loan to (Denmark) Copenhagen)
—	DF	UKR	Roman Savchenko (Loan to Chornomorets Odesa)
—	DF	UKR	Danylo Udod (Loan to Chornomorets Odesa)
—	DF	UKR	Oleh Ocheretko (Loan to Karpaty Lviv)
—	MF	UKR	Kyrylo Siheyev (Loan to Chornomorets Odesa)
—	MF	UKR	Ivan Petryak (Loan to Chornomorets Odesa)
—	MF	GEO	Luka Latsabidze (Loan to Chornomorets Odesa)
—	MF	ISR	Stav Lemkin (Loan to (Israel) Maccabi Tel Aviv)
—	MF	MKD	Yevheniy Mykytyuk (to Polissya-2 Zhytomyr)
—	MF	UKR	Dmytro Topalov (Loan to LNZ Cherkasy)

=== Veres Rivne ===
In:

No.	Pos.	Nation	Player
—	MF	UKR	Danyil Khondak (loan return from Chernihiv)
—	MF	UKR	Arsenii Korkodym (loan return from Kremin Kremenchuk)
—	MF	UKR	Yevheniy Morozko (from Polissya Zhytomyr)

Out:

No.	Pos.	Nation	Player
—	GK	UKR	Yevhen Past (Retired)

=== Vorskla Poltava ===
In:

No.	Pos.	Nation	Player
—	MF	UKR	Artem Umanets (loan return from Kremin Kremenchuk)
—	MF	UKR	Denys Ndukve (from Polissya Zhytomyr)

Out:

No.	Pos.	Nation	Player

=== Zorya Luhansk ===
In:

No.	Pos.	Nation	Player
—	DF	UKR	Oleksiy Husyev (Loan from Dynamo Kyiv)
—	MF	UKR	Tymur Korablin (from Mynai)
—	FW	NGR	Benito (Loan from Dynamo Kyiv)
—	FW	UKR	Vladyslav Buhay (Loan from Metalist 1925 Kharkiv)
—	FW	UKR	Vladyslav Vakula (from Mynai)
—	FW	UKR	Pylyp Budkivskyi
—	FW	UKR	Vladyslav Supryaha (Loan from Dynamo Kyiv)

Out:

No.	Pos.	Nation	Player
—	MF	UKR	Arseniy Batahov (to (Turkey) Trabzonspor)
—	FW	BRA	Eduardo Guerrero (to Dynamo Kyiv)

== Ukrainian First League ==
=== Ahrobiznes Volochysk ===
In:

No.	Pos.	Nation	Player
—	MF	UKR	Danylo Sydorenko (from Kremin Kremenchuk)
—	MF	UKR	Andrii Hloba (from Kremin Kremenchuk)

Out:

No.	Pos.	Nation	Player

=== Bukovyna Chernivtsi ===
In:

No.	Pos.	Nation	Player
—	MF	UKR	Yurii Dudnyk (from Kremin Kremenchuk)
—	MF	UKR	Davronbek Azizov (from Kremin Kremenchuk)
—	MF	UKR	Orest Panchyshyn (to Kremin Kremenchuk)

Out:

No.	Pos.	Nation	Player

=== Dinaz Vyshhorod ===
In:

No.	Pos.	Nation	Player
—	MF	UKR	Vladyslav Ohirya (from Chornomorets Odesa)
—	MF	UKR	Yehor Kartushov (from Karpaty Lviv)
—	MF	UKR	Yevhen Chepurnenko
—	MF	UKR	Dmytro Kulyk (from Nyva Buzova)

Out:

No.	Pos.	Nation	Player

=== Kremin Kremenchuk ===
In:

No.	Pos.	Nation	Player

Out:

No.	Pos.	Nation	Player
—	MF	UKR	Davronbek Azizov (to Bukovyna Chernivtsi)
—	MF	UKR	Orest Panchyshyn (loan return to Bukovyna Chernivtsi)
—	MF	UKR	Danylo Sydorenko (to Ahrobiznes Volochysk)
—	MF	UKR	Artem Tovkach (loan return to Metalurh Zaporizhzhia)
—	MF	UKR	Andrii Savitskyi
—	MF	UKR	Andrii Hloba (to Ahrobiznes Volochysk)
—	MF	UKR	Simon Galoyan (to Oleksandriya-2)
—	MF	UKR	Arsenii Korkodym (loan return to Veres Rivne)
—	MF	UKR	Artem Umanets (loan return to Vorskla Poltava)
—	MF	UKR	Yurii Dudnyk (to Bukovyna Chernivtsi)

=== Kudrivka ===
In:

No.	Pos.	Nation	Player
—	MF	UKR	Myroslav Serdyuk (from Nyva Buzova)
—	MF	UKR	Andriy Storchous (from Druzhba Myrivka)
—	FW	UKR	Yaroslav Kvasov (from Inhulets Petrove)
—	MF	UKR	Artur Dumanyuk (from UCSA Tarasivka)
—	FW	UKR	Danylo Volynets (from Zvyahel)
—	GK	UKR	Anton Yashkov (from Zvyahel)
—	MF	UKR	Danylo Tuzenko (from Horishni Plavni)
—	MF	UKR	Yuriy Potimkov (from Metalist 1925)
—	MF	UKR	Kyrylo Matvyeyev (from Karpaty Lviv)
—	MF	UKR	Oleksiy Lytovchenko (from Livyi Bereh Kyiv)

Out:

No.	Pos.	Nation	Player
—	GK	UKR	Georgiy Klimov (to Viktoriya Sumy)
—	MF	UKR	Volodymyr Tymenko (to Poltava)
—	MF	UKR	Yevgen Misyura (to Poltava)
—	MF	UKR	Oleksandr Mihunov (to Standart Novi Sanzhary)
—	MF	UKR	Oleksandr Kalinin (to Lisne)
—	MF	UKR	Vladyslav Zorenko (to Rebel Kyiv)
—	MF	UKR	Pavlo Zakhidnyi (to Lokomotyv Kyiv)
—	FW	UKR	Dmytro Kulyk (to Dinaz Vyshhorod)

=== Metalist 1925 Kharkiv ===
In:

No.	Pos.	Nation	Player
—	MF	UKR	Vasyl Kravets (from Polissya Zhytomyr)
—	MF	UKR	Vladyslav Kalitvintsev (from Oleksandriya)

Out:

No.	Pos.	Nation	Player
—	FW	UKR	Vladyslav Buhay (Loan to Zorya Luhansk)

=== Metalurh Zaporizhzhia ===
In:

No.	Pos.	Nation	Player
—	MF	UKR	Artem Tovkach (from Kremin Kremenchuk)

Out:

No.	Pos.	Nation	Player

=== Mynai ===
In:

No.	Pos.	Nation	Player
—	MF	UKR	Danyil Khondak (from Veres Rivne)

Out:

No.	Pos.	Nation	Player
—	MF	UKR	Sergiy Korniychuk (to Polissya Zhytomyr)
—	MF	UKR	Tymur Korablin (to Zorya Luhansk)
—	FW	UKR	Vladyslav Vakula (to Zorya Luhansk)

=== Nyva Ternopil ===
In:

No.	Pos.	Nation	Player

Out:

No.	Pos.	Nation	Player

=== Zviahel ===
In:

No.	Pos.	Nation	Player

Out:

No.	Pos.	Nation	Player
—	MF	UKR	Bogdan Panchyshyn (to Polissya-2 Zhytomyr)

== Ukrainian Second League ==
=== FC Chernihiv ===
In:

No.	Pos.	Nation	Player
—	GK	UKR	Maksym Tatarenko (From Druzhba Myrivka)
—	MF	UKR	Andriy Porokhnya (From Druzhba Myrivka)
—	MF	UKR	Maksym Serdyuk (Loan from Livyi Bereh Kyiv)
—	MF	UKR	Anatoliy Romanchenko (From Inhulets Petrove)

Out:

No.	Pos.	Nation	Player
—	MF	UKR	Oleh Osypenko (loan return to Inhulets Petrove)
—	MF	UKR	Danyil Khondak (loan return to Veres Rivne)
—	MF	UKR	Daniil Davydenko (Released)
—	MF	UKR	Roman Vovk (Released)

=== Nyva-2 Ternopil ===
In:

No.	Pos.	Nation	Player
—	MF	UKR	Yehor Kolomiets

Out:

No.	Pos.	Nation	Player

=== Oleksandriya-2 ===
In:

No.	Pos.	Nation	Player
—	MF	UKR	Simon Galoyan (from Kremin Kremenchuk)
—	DF	UKR	Illya Ukhan (from Chornomorets Odesa)

Out:

No.	Pos.	Nation	Player

=== Polissya Zhytomyr 2 ===
In:

No.	Pos.	Nation	Player
—	MF	MKD	Yevheniy Mykytyuk (from Polissya Zhytomyr)
—	MF	MKD	Dimitar Traikov (from Polissya Zhytomyr)
—	MF	UKR	Bogdan Panchyshyn (from Zviahel)
—	MF	COD	Bogdan Panchyshyn (from (Democratic Republic of the Congo) Brazzaville)
—	DF	UKR	Oleksiy Avramenko (from Dnipro-1)

Out:

No.	Pos.	Nation	Player
—	GK	UKR	Artem Pospyelov (Reliased)

=== Uzhhorod ===
In:

No.	Pos.	Nation	Player
—	GK	UKR	Ivan Dubovyi (Loan from Cherkasy)

Out:

No.	Pos.	Nation	Player

=== Uzhhorod ===
In:

No.	Pos.	Nation	Player
—	DF	UKR	Yaroslav Karaman (to Polissya Zhytomyr)

Out:

No.	Pos.	Nation	Player
