= 2024–25 FC Chornomorets Odesa season =

FC Chornomorets Odesa
2024–25 season
- Owner: Vertex United
- General Director: Anatoly Mysyura
- Head coach: Oleksandr Babych (until 23 March 2025); Oleksandr Kucher (since 24 March 2025)
- Stadium: Chornomorets Stadium
- Ukrainian Premier League: 16th of 16 (relegated)
- Ukrainian Cup: Third preliminary round
- Top goalscorer: League: Denis Yanakov (5); All: Denis Yanakov (5)
Main colours	Second colours

The 2024–25 season was the 87th season in the club's history and the 34th season of Odesa football club "Chornomorets" in the domestic league/cup of Ukraine. "The Sailors" competed in the 2024–25 Ukrainian Premier League and 2024–25 Ukrainian Cup. The team was playing in the top flight of Ukrainian football for the 29th time, and in the Ukrainian Premier League for the 15th time. On 18 May 2025, Chornomorets were relegated to the Ukrainian First League following a 1–1 draw to Dynamo Kyiv.

== Transfers, loans and other signings ==
=== June – September 2024 ===
==== Out ====
Date	Pos.	Player	Moved to	Fee	Ref.
30 June 2024	FW	(Nigeria) Samson Iyede	(Denmark) AC Horsens	End of loan	
30 June 2024	MF	(Ukraine) Artur Avahimyan	(Ukraine) FC Oleksandriya	End of loan	
1 July 2024	MF	(Ukraine) Maksym Braharu	(Ukraine) Dynamo Kyiv	€300,000	
1 July 2024	MF	(Ukraine) Illya Putrya	(Ukraine) LNZ Cherkasy	Free	
1 July 2024	FW	(Ukraine) Danylo Holub	(Ukraine) Bukovyna Chernivtsi	Free	
1 July 2024	FW	(Ukraine) Bohdan Boychuk	(Ukraine) Bukovyna Chernivtsi	Free	
2 July 2024	MF	(Ukraine) Orest Kuzyk	(Ukraine) Karpaty Lviv	Free	
5 July 2024	DF	(Ukraine) Illya Ukhan	(Ukraine) FC Oleksandriya-2	Free	
8 July 2024	MF	(Belgium) Ziguy Badibanga	Released		
11 July 2024	FW	(Argentina) Fabricio Alvarenga	Released		
13 July 2024	DF	(Slovenia) Luka Guček	(Ukraine) Vorskla Poltava	Free	
17 July 2024	MF	(Ukraine) Vladyslav Ohirya	(Ukraine) Dinaz Vyshhorod	Free	
30 July 2024	GK	(Ukraine) Oleh Bilyk	(Ukraine) Epitsentr Kamianets-Podilskyi	Free	
30 July 2024	FW	(Ukraine) Andriy Shtohrin	(Azerbaijan) Neftçi Baku	€230,000	
1 August 2024	MF	(Ukraine) Yevhen Danylyuk	(Ukraine) Revera 1908 Ivano-Frankivsk	Free	
5 August 2024	DF	(Ukraine) Volodymyr Salyuk	(Ukraine) Metalist 1925	€500,000	
17 August 2024	DF	(Ukraine) Vladyslav Shapoval	(Ukraine) Livyi Bereh	Free	
27 August 2024	MF	(Nigeria) Jack Ipalibo	(Hungary) Zalaegerszegi TE	Free	
6 September 2024	GK	(Ukraine) Danylo Varakuta	(Ukraine) Metalist 1925	Free	

==== In ====
Date	Pos.	Player	Moved from	Fee	Ref.
1 July 2024	GK	(Ukraine) Artur Rudko	(Ukraine) Shakhtar Donetsk	Free	
1 July 2024	DF	(Ukraine) Bohdan Butko	(Ukraine) Zorya Luhansk	Free	
22 July 2024	MF	(Ukraine) Denis Yanakov	(Ukraine) Polissya Zhytomyr	Free	
22 July 2024	DF	(Ukraine) Bohdan Biloshevskyi	(Ukraine) FC Oleksandriya	Free	
24 July 2024	FW	(Ukraine) Oleksiy Khoblenko	(Ukraine) LNZ Cherkasy	Free	
26 July 2024	DF	(Ukraine) Borys Lototskyi	(Ukraine) Nyva Vinnytsia	Free	
30 July 2024	DF	(Ukraine) Danylo Udod	(Ukraine) Shakhtar Donetsk	Loan	
30 July 2024	DF	(Ukraine) Roman Savchenko	(Ukraine) Shakhtar Donetsk	Loan	
2 August 2024	MF	(Ukraine) Artem Habelok	(Ukraine) Metalist 1925	Free	
2 August 2024	MF	(Ukraine) Vladyslav Kalyn	(Ukraine) Dynamo Kyiv U19	Loan	
3 August 2024	FW	(Ukraine) Kiril Popov	(Ukraine) Kolos Kovalivka	Free	
9 August 2024	DF	(Ukraine) Yaroslav Kysil	(Ukraine) FC Mynai	Free	
12 August 2024	DF	(Brazil) Caio Gomes	(Brazil) Atlético Clube Paranavaí	Free	
16 August 2024	MF	(Brazil) João Neto	(United Arab Emirates) Emirates Club	Free	
20 August 2024	MF	(Ukraine) Yevhen Yanovich	(Ukraine) Shakhtar Donetsk	Loan	
21 August 2024	MF	(Ukraine) Mykhaylo Khromey	(Ukraine) Shakhtar Donetsk	Loan	
26 August 2024	MF	(Ukraine) Ivan Petryak	(Ukraine) Shakhtar Donetsk	Loan	
28 August 2024	MF	(Ukraine) Kyrylo Siheyev	(Ukraine) Shakhtar Donetsk	Loan	
3 September 2024	DF	(Georgia (country)) Luka Latsabidze	(Ukraine) Shakhtar Donetsk	Loan	
6 September 2024	GK	(Nigeria) Chijioke Aniagboso	(Ukraine) Polissya Zhytomyr	Free	
6 September 2024	DF	(The Gambia) Moses Jarju	(Ukraine) Polissya Zhytomyr	Free	
6 September 2024	DF	(Ukraine) Yevheniy Skyba	(Ukraine) FC Mynai	Free	
6 September 2024	MF	(Ukraine) Illya Shevtsov	Free agent	Free	

=== December 2024 – March 2025 ===
==== Out ====
Date	Pos.	Player	Moved to	Fee	Ref.
31 December 2024	MF	(Ukraine) Ivan Petryak	(Ukraine) Shakhtar Donetsk	End of loan	
1 January 2025	DF	(Ukraine) Borys Lototskyi	Released		
7 January 2025	DF	(Ukraine) Roman Savchenko	(Ukraine) Shakhtar Donetsk	End of loan	
7 January 2025	MF	(Ukraine) Vladyslav Kalyn	(Ukraine) Dynamo Kyiv U19	End of loan	
7 January 2025	MF	(Ukraine) Yevhen Yanovich	(Ukraine) Shakhtar Donetsk	End of loan	
7 January 2025	MF	(Ukraine) Mykhaylo Khromey	(Ukraine) Shakhtar Donetsk	End of loan	
11 March 2025	MF	(Ukraine) Oleksandr Vasylyev	(Ukraine) Bukovyna Chernivtsi	Free	

==== In ====
Date	Pos.	Player	Moved from	Fee	Ref.
18 January 2025	DF	(Ukraine) Mahomed Kratov	(Ukraine) Lokomotyv Kyiv	Free	
24 January 2025	FW	(Ukraine) Denys Bezborodko	(Ukraine) Kolos Kovalivka	Free	
24 January 2025	MF	(Azerbaijan) Emil Mustafayev	(Ukraine) Polissya Zhytomyr	Loan	
19 February 2025	DF	(Brazil) Ryan Carlos Santos de Sousa	(Brazil) Bahia	Loan	
19 February 2025	MF	(Ukraine) Ihor Kohut	(Ukraine) Metalist 1925 Kharkiv	Loan	
19 February 2025	MF	(Ukraine) Bogdan Panchyshyn	(Ukraine) Polissya-2 Zhytomyr	Loan	
20 February 2025	MF	(Georgia (country)) Giorgi Robakidze	(Georgia (country)) WIT Georgia	Free	
25 February 2025	FW	(Tajikistan) Khusrav Toirov	(Ukraine) Shakhtar Donetsk	Loan	
28 February 2025	MF	(Panama) Anel Ryce	(Panama) Plaza Amador	Loan	
28 March 2025	DF	(Ukraine) Yaroslav Rakitskyi	Career break	Free	

== Season overview ==
Note: Only the date of an official match is marked in bold.

=== July 2024 ===
- July 9, 2024 FC Chornomorets announced appointment of Oleksandr Babych as head coach, after Roman Hryhorchuk left the club.

=== August 2024 ===
- **August 3, 2024** In the 1st round of the Ukrainian Premier League, Chornomorets played in Kryvyi Rih against local club FC Kryvbas and lost 0–1. Rudko, Butko, Udod, Savchenko, Popov, Kalyn, Habelok, Pshenychnyuk Arsić, and Lototskyi made their official debut as players of Chornomorets.
- **August 10, 2024** In the 2nd round of the Ukrainian Premier League, playing at home, the Sailors lost 0–1 to Zorya Luhansk. Kysil made his official debut as a player of Chornomorets.
- **August 16, 2024** In the 3rd round of the Ukrainian Premier League, playing in Odesa, Chornomorets outlasted Kolos Kovalivka, winning 1–0. Caio Gomes made his official debut as a player of Chornomorets.
- **August 21, 2024** In the third preliminary round (1/16) of the 2024–25 Ukrainian Cup, the Sailors played in Lviv against FC Karpaty Lviv and lost 0–3. In this match FC Chornomorets coaches let players play who have little playing time in the matches of UPL or who have not played at all so far. Vichnyi, Khromey, Yanovich, Kaptenko, Timerlan Hryhorchuk and João Neto made their official debut as players of Chornomorets.
- **August 26, 2024** In the 4th round of the Ukrainian Premier League, Chornomorets played in Kyiv Oblast against local club Livyi Bereh and lost 0–1. The match was scheduled to start at 15:30 EET. But in connection with the long-term air alarm, the start of the match was postponed to 17:00 EET. Petryak and Biloshevskyi made their official debut as players of Chornomorets.
- **August 31, 2024** In the 5th round of the Ukrainian Premier League, playing at home, the Sailors lost 1–4 to Polissya Zhytomyr. Siheyev made his official debut as a player of Chornomorets.

=== September 2024 ===
- September 7, 2024 Chornomorets won against FC Athletic Odesa 8–1 in a friendly in Odesa.
- **September 14, 2024** In the 6th round of the Ukrainian Premier League, playing at home, the Sailors outlasted Inhulets Petrove 1–0. Oleksandr Pshenychnyuk scored his first club and league goal. Skyba and Latsabidze made their official debut as players of Chornomorets.
- **September 21, 2024** In the 7th round of the Ukrainian Premier League, playing in Odesa, Chornomorets lost 0–1 to Karpaty Lviv. This was the 800th match for the club from Odesa in the Ukrainian top division.
- **September 28, 2024** In the 8th round of the Ukrainian Premier League, playing in Kovalivka, Chornomorets drew LNZ Cherkasy 1–1. Aniagboso and Jarju made their official debut as players of Chornomorets. Making his official debut in the Ukrainian Premier League at the age of 20 years 166 days, Aniagboso became the youngest foreign goalkeeper in the Ukrainian national championship.

=== October 2024 ===
- **October 4, 2024** In the 9th round of the Ukrainian Premier League, playing at home, the Sailors outlasted Obolon Kyiv, winning 1–0. Illya Shevtsov made his official debut as a player of Chornomorets, and scored his first club and league goal.
- October 12, 2024 Chornomorets lost against Inhulets Petrove 0–1 in a friendly in Odesa. The game took place in the format of 4 halves of 35 minutes each.
- **October 20, 2024** In the 10th round of the Ukrainian Premier League, playing at home, the Sailors drew Veres Rivne 1–1.
- **October 25, 2024** In the 11th round of the Ukrainian Premier League, playing in Lviv, Chornomorets drew Rukh Lviv 1–1.

=== November 2024 ===
- **November 2, 2024** In the 12th round of the Ukrainian Premier League, playing in Lviv, the Sailors lost 1–2 to Shakhtar Donetsk. Artem Habelok scored his first goal for Chornomorets.
- **November 8, 2024** In the 13th round of the Ukrainian Premier League, playing at home, Chornomorets lost 0–1 to Vorskla Poltava.
- November 16, 2024 The Sailors won against Obolon Kyiv 5–1 in a friendly in Kyiv. The game took place in the format of 4 halves of 35 minutes each.
- **November 23, 2024** In the 14th round of the Ukrainian Premier League, playing in Kyiv Chornomorets lost 1–3 to local side Dynamo. Yevhen Skyba scored his first goal for Chornomorets.

=== December 2024 ===
- **December 1, 2024** In the 15th round of the Ukrainian Premier League, playing in Oleksandriya the Sailors lost 0–3 to local side FC Oleksandriya.
- **December 7, 2024** In the 16th round of the Ukrainian Premier League, playing at home, Chornomorets lost 1–3 to Kryvbas Kryvyi Rih.
- **December 14, 2024** In the 17th round of the Ukrainian Premier League, playing in Kyiv the Sailors lost 1–2 to Zorya Luhansk.

=== January 2025 ===
- January 23, 2025 Chornomorets won against Dukagjini 2–1 in a friendly in Manavgat, Turkey.
- January 26, 2025 The Sailors won against Drita 3–1 in a friendly in Belek, Turkey.
- January 30, 2025 Chornomorets lost against Kisvárda 1–2 in a friendly in Manavgat, Turkey. The Sailors won against Malisheva 1–0 in a friendly in Belek, Turkey.

=== February 2025 ===
- February 4, 2025 Chornomorets won against Fratria 2–1 in a friendly in Manavgat, Turkey. The Sailors lost against Kolkheti-1913 3–4 in a friendly in Manavgat, Turkey.
- February 8, 2025 Chornomorets drew Csíkszereda 1–1 in a friendly in Belek, Turkey. The Sailors won against Bălți 3–0 in a friendly in Manavgat, Turkey.
- February 11, 2025 Chornomorets lost against Uzgen 1–4 in a friendly in Manavgat, Turkey.
- February 12, 2025 The Sailors drew Dila 1–1 in a friendly in Manavgat, Turkey.
- **February 21, 2025** In the 18th round of the Ukrainian Premier League, playing in Kovalivka, Chornomorets outlasted Kolos Kovalivka, winning 2–1. Kratov, Ryan, Mustafayev, Bezborodko and Robakidze made their official debut as players of Chornomorets. Popov scored his first goal as a player of Chornomorets.

=== March 2025 ===
- **March 1, 2025** In the 19th round of the Ukrainian Premier League, playing at home, the Sailors lost 0–1 to Livyi Bereh. Kohut and Toirov made their official debut as players of Chornomorets.
- **March 6, 2025** In the 20th round of the Ukrainian Premier League, playing in Zhytomyr, Chornomorets lost 1–3 to Polissya Zhytomyr. Ryce made his official debut as a player of Chornomorets.
- **March 16, 2025** In the 21st round of the Ukrainian Premier League, playing in Odesa the Sailors lost 0–1 to Inhulets Petrove.
- March 22, 2025 Chornomorets won against Real Pharma 5–0 in a friendly in Lymanka, Ukraine. There were four times of 30 minutes each.
- March 23, 2025 The Sailors have announced, the head coach Oleksandr Babych has been fired.
- March 24, 2025 FC Chornomorets has announced they had appointed Oleksandr Kucher as new head coach.
- **March 30, 2025** In the 22nd round of the Ukrainian Premier League, playing in Lviv, Chornomorets lost 0–4 to Karpaty Lviv. Rakitskyi made his official debut as a player of Chornomorets.

=== April 2025 ===
- **April 5, 2025** In the 23rd round of the Ukrainian Premier League, playing at home, the Sailors outlasted LNZ Cherkasy, winning 1–0.
- **April 12, 2025** In the 24th round of the Ukrainian Premier League, playing in Kyiv, Chornomorets lost 0–1 to Obolon Kyiv.
- **April 20, 2025** In the 25th round of the Ukrainian Premier League, playing in Rivne, the Sailors lost 1–2 to NK Veres.
- **April 26, 2025** In the 26th round of the Ukrainian Premier League, playing at home, Chornomorets lost 1–2 to Rukh Lviv.

=== May 2025 ===
- **May 3, 2025** In the 27th round of the Ukrainian Premier League, playing at home, the Sailors lost 0–3 to Shakhtar Donetsk.
- **May 10, 2025** In the 28th round of the Ukrainian Premier League, playing in Poltava, Chornomorets outlasted FC Vorskla, winning 2–1. Moses Jarju scored his first club and league goal.
- **May 18, 2025** In the 29th round of the Ukrainian Premier League, playing at home, the Sailors drew Dynamo Kyiv 1–1. Following the draw Chornomorets were relegated to the Ukrainian First League.
- **May 24, 2025** In the 30th round of the Ukrainian Premier League, playing at home, Chornomorets drew FC Oleksandriya 0–0.

== Club staff ==
=== Staff (personalities and positions) ===
Job title	Since 1 July 2024	Since 25 March 2025	Since 16 April 2025
Administration
Vice-president	(Ukraine) Oleksiy Klimov (Ukraine) Ihor Cherkasov	(Ukraine) Dmytro Shapiro	
General director	(Ukraine) Anatoliy Mysyura		
Executive director	-	(Ukraine) Artur Ohanesyan	
Sporting director	(Ukraine) Serhiy Syvolap	(Ukraine) Oleksandr Babych	
Coaching (first team)
Head coach	(Ukraine) Oleksandr Babych	(Ukraine) Oleksandr Kucher	
Assistant coach	(Ukraine) Anatoliy Didenko (Ukraine) Sergey Syzykhin (Ukraine) Volodymyr Belakov	(Ukraine) Anatoliy Didenko (Ukraine) Taras Gvozdyk (Ukraine) Vladyslav Burlaka (Ukraine) Oleksandr Pryzetko	(Ukraine) Anatoliy Didenko (Ukraine) Taras Gvozdyk (Ukraine) Oleksandr Pryzetko (Ukraine) Oleksandr Hrytsay
Goalkeeping coach	(Ukraine) Yevhen Borovyk		
Coach analyst	(Ukraine) Orest Dmyterko	-	
Coaching (U-19 team)
Head coach	(Ukraine) Andriy Uschapovskyi		
Assistant coach	(Ukraine) Vitaliy Starovik		
Fitness coach	(Ukraine) Victoria Samar		
Coach analyst	(Ukraine) Sergey Aristarkhov		

== Kits ==
=== Kit information ===
It was Kelme's fourth year supplying Chornomorets Odesa kit. In the first four official matches of the season, the Sailors used the uniform of the 2023–24 season. On August 27, 2024, the team presented a new "home" (main kit) uniform. For the first time, Chornomorets used the new uniform on August 31, 2024 in the 5th round of the Ukrainian Premier League.

Supplier: Kelme / Kit sponsor (chest): vbet, Tavria V / Sleeve sponsor: Kelme, UPL.TV / Back sponsor: MTB Bank / Shorts sponsor: Tavria V

Kits used in the first four official matches of the season
Main kit	Second kit

Kits used since August 31, 2024
Main kit	Second kit

== Pre-season and friendlies ==
Win Draw Loss

3 July 2024 Friendly	Chornomorets (Ukraine)	2–2	(Ukraine) Nyva Vinnytsia	Lymanka, Ukraine
16:00 EET		Report		Stadium: Training base "Chornomorets"

6 July 2024 Friendly	Chornomorets (Ukraine)	1–2	(Ukraine) Inhulets Petrove	Lymanka, Ukraine
17:00 EET		Report		Stadium: Training base "Chornomorets"

11 July 2024 Friendly	Chornomorets (Ukraine)	3–3	(Ukraine) Real Pharma	Lymanka, Ukraine
18:00 EET		Report		Stadium: Training base "Chornomorets"

14 July 2024 Friendly	Kolos Kovalivka (Ukraine)	3–1	(Ukraine) Chornomorets	Kovalivka, Ukraine
17:00 EET		Report		Stadium: Kolos

19 July 2024 Friendly	Chornomorets (Ukraine)	2–1	(Ukraine) FSC Mariupol	Lymanka, Ukraine
18:30 EET		Report		Stadium: Training base "Chornomorets"

20 July 2024 Friendly	Chornomorets (Ukraine)	5–2	(Ukraine) Real Pharma	Lymanka, Ukraine
18:00 EET		Report		Stadium: Training base "Chornomorets"

27 July 2024 Friendly	FC Oleksandriya (Ukraine)	2–0	(Ukraine) Chornomorets	Oleksandriya, Ukraine
10:30 EET		Report		Stadium: CSC «Nika»

23 January 2025 Friendly	Chornomorets (Ukraine)	2–1	(Kosovo) Dukagjini	Manavgat, Turkey
11:00		Report		Stadium: «Emirhan Sport Center»

26 January 2025 Friendly	Chornomorets (Ukraine)	3–1	(Kosovo) Drita	Belek, Turkey
15:30		Report		Stadium: «Fanatic Sport»

30 January 2025 Friendly	Chornomorets (Ukraine)	1–2	(Hungary) Kisvárda	Manavgat, Turkey
10:30		Report		Stadium: «Emirhan Sport Center»

30 January 2025 Friendly	Malisheva (Kosovo)	0–1	(Ukraine) Chornomorets	Belek, Turkey
16:00		Report		Stadium: «Fanatic Sport»

4 February 2025 Friendly	Chornomorets (Ukraine)	2–1	(Bulgaria) Fratria	Manavgat, Turkey
11:30		Report		Stadium: «Emirhan Sport Center»

4 February 2025 Friendly	Chornomorets (Ukraine)	3–4	(Georgia (country)) Kolkheti-1913	Manavgat, Turkey
16:30		Report		Stadium: «Hane Hotels Football Center»

8 February 2025 Friendly	Chornomorets (Ukraine)	1–1	(Romania) Csíkszereda	Belek, Turkey
11:00		Report		Stadium: «Fanatic sport»

8 February 2025 Friendly	Chornomorets (Ukraine)	3–0	(Moldova) Bălți	Manavgat, Turkey
17:00		Report		Stadium: «Emirhan Sport Center»

11 February 2025 Friendly	Chornomorets (Ukraine)	1–4	(Kyrgyzstan) Uzgen	Manavgat, Turkey
16:00		Report		Stadium: «Ilica»

12 February 2025 Friendly	Chornomorets (Ukraine)	1–1	(Georgia (country)) Dila	Manavgat, Turkey
16:30		Report		Stadium: «Hane Hotels Football Center»

22 March 2025 Friendly	Chornomorets (Ukraine)	5–0	(Ukraine) Real Pharma	Lymanka, Ukraine
11:00 EET		Report		Stadium: Training base "Chornomorets"

== Competitions ==
=== Overall record ===
Competition	First match	Last match	Starting round	Final position	Record							
Competition	First match	Last match	Starting round	Final position	Pld	W	D	L	GF	GA	GD	Win %
Ukrainian Premier League	3 August 2024	24 May 2025	Matchday 1	16th of 16	30	6	5	19	20	45	−25	20.00
Ukrainian Cup	21 August 2024	21 August 2024	Round of 32	Round of 32	1	0	0	1	0	3	−3	0.00
Total					31	6	5	20	20	48	−28	19.35

Last updated: 1 May 2025
Source: Soccerway

=== Ukrainian Premier League ===
==== League table ====
Pos	Team	Pld	W	D	L	GF	GA	GD	Pts	Qualification or relegation
1	Dynamo Kyiv (C)	30	20	10	0	61	19	+42	70	Qualification for the Champions League second qualifying round
2	Oleksandriya	30	20	7	3	46	22	+24	67	Qualification for the Conference League second qualifying round
3	Shakhtar Donetsk	30	18	8	4	69	26	+43	62	Qualification for the Europa League first qualifying round (Note: Shakhtar Donetsk qualified for the Europa League first qualifying round by winning the 2024–25 Ukrainian Cup; the second Conference League spot was passed to the fourth-placed team.)
4	Polissya Zhytomyr	30	12	12	6	38	28	+10	48	Qualification for the Conference League second qualifying round
5	Kryvbas Kryvyi Rih	30	13	8	9	34	26	+8	47	
6	Karpaty Lviv	30	13	7	10	42	36	+6	46	
7	Zorya Luhansk	30	12	4	14	34	39	−5	40	
8	Rukh Lviv	30	9	11	10	30	27	+3	38	
9	Veres Rivne	30	9	9	12	33	44	−11	36 (Note: Head-to-head points: Veres Rivne 6, Kolos Kovalivka 0.)	
10	Kolos Kovalivka	30	8	12	10	27	25	+2	36	
11	Obolon Kyiv	30	8	8	14	19	43	−24	32	
12	LNZ Cherkasy	30	7	10	13	25	37	−12	31	
13	Vorskla Poltava	30	6	9	15	24	38	−14	27	Qualification for the Relegation play-off
14	Livyi Bereh Kyiv	30	7	5	18	18	39	−21	26	Qualification for the Relegation play-off
15	Inhulets Petrove (R)	30	5	9	16	21	47	−26	24	Relegation to the Ukrainian First League
16	CHORNOMORETS ODESA (R)	30	6	5	19	20	45	−25	23	Relegation to the Ukrainian First League

Source: upl.ua
Rules for classification: 1) Points; 2) Head-to-head points; 3) Head-to-head goal difference; 4) Head-to-head goals scored; 5) Goal difference; 6) Goals scored; 7) Draw or "Golden match" if two teams tied for title (Article 22, paragraph 3).
(C) Champions; (R) Relegated

==== Results summary ====
Overall								Home						Away					
Pld	W	D	L	GF	GA	GD	Pts	W	D	L	GF	GA	GD	W	D	L	GF	GA	GD
30	6	5	19	20	45	−25	23	4	3	8	9	18	−9	2	2	11	11	27	−16

Source: Soccerway

==== Results by round ====
Round	1	2	3	4	5	6	7	8	9	10	11	12	13	14	15	16	17	18	19	20	21	22	23	24	25	26	27	28	29	30
Ground	A	H	H	A	H	H	H	A	H	H	A	A	H	A	A	H	A	A	H	A	A	A	H	A	A	H	H	A	H	H
Result	L	L	W	L	L	W	L	D	W	D	D	L	L	L	L	L	L	W	L	L	L	L	W	L	L	L	L	W	D	D
Position	14	15	11	14	13	11	13	11	9	10	10	11	13	13	13	14	15	15	15	15	16	16	16	16	16	16	16	16	16	16
Points	0	0	3	3	3	6	6	7	10	11	12	12	12	12	12	12	12	15	15	15	15	15	18	18	18	18	18	21	22	23
Head coach / Babych	x	x	x	x	x	x	x	x	x	x	x	x	x	x	x	x	x	x	x	x	x									
Head coach / Kucher																						x	x	x	x	x	x	x	x	x

Updated to match(es) played on April 2026. Source: Soccerway
A = Away; H = Home; W = Win; D = Draw; L = Loss

==== Score overview ====
Win Draw Loss

Opposition	Home score	Away score	Aggregate score	Double
Dynamo Kyiv	1–1	1–3	2–4	No
Oleksandriya	0–0	0–3	0–3	No
Shakhtar Donetsk	0–3	1–2	1–5	No
Polissya Zhytomyr	1–3	1–4	2–7	No
Kryvbas Kryvyi Rih	1–3	0–1	1–4	No
Karpaty Lviv	0–1	0–4	0–5	No
Zorya Luhansk	0–1	1–2	1–3	No
Rukh Lviv	1–2	1–1	2–3	No
Veres Rivne	1–1	1–2	2–3	No
Kolos Kovalivka	1–0	2–1	3–1	Yes
Obolon Kyiv	1–0	0–1	1–1	No
LNZ Cherkasy	1–0	1–1	2–1	No
Vorskla Poltava	0–1	2–1	2–2	No
Livyi Bereh Kyiv	0–1	0–1	0–2	No
Inhulets Petrove	1–0	0–1	1–1	No

==== Matches ====
The league fixtures were announced on 28 June 2024.
Win Draw Loss Fixtures

3 August 2024 1	Kryvbas Kryvyi Rih	1–0	Chornomorets Odesa	Kryvyi Rih, Ukraine
18:00 EET	Tverdokhlib 6'	Report		Stadium: Hirnyk; Attendance: 587; Referee: M. Kozyryatskyi (Zaporizhzhia)
Note: Protocol Vlog

10 August 2024 2	Chornomorets Odesa	0–1	Zorya Luhansk	Odesa, Ukraine
15:30 EET		Report	Guerrero 50'	Stadium: Chornomorets; Attendance: 0 Referee: D. Yevtukhov (Dnipro)
Note: Protocol Vlog

16 August 2024 3	Chornomorets Odesa	1–0	Kolos Kovalivka	Odesa, Ukraine
15:30 EET	Khoblenko 35'	Report		Stadium: Chornomorets; Attendance: 0 Referee: K. Zabroda (Kyiv)
Note: Protocol Vlog

26 August 2024 4	Livyi Bereh	1–0	Chornomorets Odesa	Kyiv Oblast, Ukraine
17:00 EET	Yakymiv 29'	Report		Stadium: Arena Livyi Bereh; Attendance: 587; Referee: Y. Tsybulko (Cherkasy)
Note: Protocol Vlog

31 August 2024 5	Chornomorets Odesa	1–4	Polissya Zhytomyr	Odesa, Ukraine
18:30 EET	Butko 45+3'	Report	Nazarenko 3' (pen.); Cauã Paixão 8'; Hutsulyak 35'; Lyednyev 90+5'	Stadium: Chornomorets; Attendance: 0 Referee: O. Afanasyev (Kharkiv)
Note: Protocol Vlog

14 September 2024 6	Chornomorets Odesa	1–0	Inhulets Petrove	Odesa, Ukraine
13:00 EET	Pshenychnyuk 90+3'	Report		Stadium: Chornomorets; Attendance: 0 Referee: A. Romanyuk (Ivano-Frankivsk)
Note: Protocol Vlog

21 September 2024 7	Chornomorets Odesa	0–1	Karpaty Lviv	Odesa, Ukraine
13:00 EET		Report	Sakiv 52'	Stadium: Chornomorets; Attendance: 0 Referee: D. Yevtukhov (Dnipro)
Note: Protocol Vlog

28 September 2024 8	LNZ Cherkasy	1–1	Chornomorets Odesa	Kovalivka, Ukraine
17:00 EET	Momoh 42'	Report	Yanakov 82'	Stadium: Kolos; Attendance: 170; Referee: A. Mykhaylyuk (Zhytomyr)
Note: Protocol Vlog

4 October 2024 9	Chornomorets Odesa	1–0	Obolon Kyiv	Odesa, Ukraine
15:30 EET	Shevtsov 87'	Report		Stadium: Chornomorets; Attendance: 0 Referee: O. Kohut (Ternopil)
Note: Protocol Vlog

20 October 2024 10	Chornomorets Odesa	1–1	Veres Rivne	Odesa, Ukraine
15:30 EET	Morozko 22' (o.g.)	Report	Vovchenko 65'	Stadium: Chornomorets; Attendance: 0 Referee: O. Solovyan (Kyiv)
Note: Protocol Vlog

25 October 2024 11	Rukh Lviv	1–1	Chornomorets Odesa	Lviv, Ukraine
15:30 EET	Kvasnytsya 54'	Report	Yanakov 83'	Stadium: Arena Lviv; Attendance: 350; Referee: K. Zabroda (Kyiv)
Note: Protocol Vlog

2 November 2024 12	Shakhtar Donetsk	2–1	Chornomorets Odesa	Lviv, Ukraine
18:00 EET	Zubkov 17'; Bondarenko 45+1'	Report	Habelok 20'	Stadium: Arena Lviv; Attendance: 967; Referee: D. Panchyshyn (Kharkiv)
Note: Protocol Vlog

8 November 2024 13	Chornomorets Odesa	0–1	Vorskla Poltava	Odesa, Ukraine
15:30 EET		Report	Ndukve 79'	Stadium: Chornomorets; Attendance: 0 Referee: D. Reznikov (Kamianske)
Note: Protocol Vlog

23 November 2024 14	Dynamo Kyiv	3–1	Chornomorets Odesa	Kyiv, Ukraine
15:30 EET	Vanat 16'; Buyalskyi 69'; Rubchynskyi 88'	Report	Skyba 90+3'	Stadium: Valeriy Lobanovskyi Dynamo Stadium; Attendance: 1,492; Referee: M. Kozyryatskyi (Zaporizhzhia)
Note: Protocol Vlog

1 December 2024 15	Oleksandriya	3–0	Chornomorets Odesa	Oleksandriya, Ukraine
13:00 EET	Vashchenko 16'; Kostyshyn 80'; Kozak 90+1'	Report		Stadium: CSC Nika Stadium; Attendance: 865; Referee: O. Omelchenko (Sloviansk)
Note: Protocol Vlog

7 December 2024 16	Chornomorets Odesa	1–3	Kryvbas Kryvyi Rih	Odesa, Ukraine
15:30 EET	Skyba 34'	Report	Ilić 41' (pen.); Mykytyshyn 45+1'; Tverdokhlib 80'	Stadium: Chornomorets; Attendance: 0 Referee: V. Kopiyevskyi (Kropyvnytskyi)
Note: Protocol Vlog

14 December 2024 17	Zorya Luhansk	2–1	Chornomorets Odesa	Kyiv, Ukraine
18:00 EET	Mićin 9'; Bašić 90+2'	Report	Yanakov 81'	Stadium: Valeriy Lobanovskyi Dynamo Stadium; Attendance: 176; Referee: R. Blavatskyi (Lviv)
Note: Protocol Vlog

21 February 2025 18	Kolos Kovalivka	1–2	Chornomorets Odesa	Kovalivka, Ukraine
15:30 EET	Kovtalyuk 2'	Report	Skyba 10'; Popov 87'	Stadium: Kolos; Attendance: 256; Referee: V. Novokhatniy (Cherkasy Oblast)
Note: Protocol Vlog

1 March 2025 19	Chornomorets Odesa	0–1	Livyi Bereh	Odesa, Ukraine
15:30 EET		Report	Shastal 22'	Stadium: Chornomorets; Attendance: 0 Referee: O. Shandor (Lviv)
Note: Protocol Vlog

6 March 2025 20	Polissya Zhytomyr	3–1	Chornomorets Odesa	Zhytomyr, Ukraine
13:00 EET	Batista 5'; Andriyevskyi 43'; Hutsulyak 78'	Report	Yanakov 57' (pen.)	Stadium: Tsentralnyi; Attendance: 1,200; Referee: D. Shurman (Kyiv Oblast)
Note: Protocol Vlog

16 March 2025 21	Inhulets Petrove	1–0	Chornomorets Odesa	Odesa, Ukraine
13:00 EET	Pushkaryov 18'	Report		Stadium: Chornomorets; Attendance: 0 Referee: O. Solovyan (Kyiv)
Note: Protocol Vlog

30 March 2025 22	Karpaty Lviv	4–0	Chornomorets Odesa	Lviv, Ukraine
15:30 EET	Bruninho 41' (pen.); Bruninho 45' (pen.); Bruninho 50'; Kostenko 56'	Report		Stadium: Ukraina; Attendance: 3,200; Referee: A. Romanyuk (Ivano-Frankivsk)
Note: Protocol Vlog

5 April 2025 23	Chornomorets Odesa	1–0	LNZ Cherkasy	Odesa, Ukraine
15:30 EET	Skyba 18'	Report		Stadium: Chornomorets; Attendance: 0 Referee: S. Zadyran (Kyiv Oblast)
Note: Protocol Vlog

12 April 2025 24	Obolon Kyiv	1–0	Chornomorets Odesa	Kyiv, Ukraine
18:00 EET	Aniagboso 30' (o.g.)	Report		Stadium: Obolon Arena; Attendance: 1,340; Referee: O. Derevinskyi (Khmelnytskyi)
Note: Protocol Vlog

20 April 2025 25	Veres Rivne	2–1	Chornomorets Odesa	Rivne, Ukraine
18:00 EET	Stepanyuk 51'; Dakhnovskyi 61'	Report	Yanakov 8'	Stadium: Avanhard; Attendance: 1,733; Referee: O. Kohut (Ternopil)
Note: Protocol Vlog

26 April 2025 26	Chornomorets Odesa	1–2	Rukh Lviv	Odesa, Ukraine
13:00 EET	Khoblenko 62'	Report	Klymchuk 20'; Ryabov 76'	Stadium: Chornomorets Stadium; Attendance: 0 Referee: Y. Tsybulko (Cherkasy)
Note: Protocol Vlog

3 May 2025 27	Chornomorets Odesa	0–3	Shakhtar Donetsk	Odesa, Ukraine
13:00 EET		Report	Bondarenko 55'; Newerton 71', 75'	Stadium: Chornomorets Stadium; Attendance: 0 Referee: R. Blavatskyi (Lviv)
Note: Protocol Vlog

10 May 2025 28	Vorskla Poltava	1–2	Chornomorets Odesa	Poltava, Ukraine
13:00 EET	Ndukve 43'	Report	Khoblenko 77'; Jarju 82'	Stadium: Oleksiy Butovsky Vorskla Stadium; Attendance: 2,743; Referee: K. Zabroda (Kyiv)
Note: Protocol Vlog

18 May 2025 29	Chornomorets Odesa	1–1	Dynamo Kyiv	Odesa, Ukraine
15:30 EET	Khoblenko 68'	Report	Yarmolenko 54' (pen.)	Stadium: Chornomorets Stadium; Attendance: 2,100; Referee: I. Paschal (Kherson)
Note: Protocol Vlog

24 May 2025 30	Chornomorets Odesa	0–0	Oleksandriya	Odesa, Ukraine
13:00 EET		Report		Stadium: Chornomorets Stadium; Attendance: 1,492; Referee: Y. Tsybulko (Cherkasy)
Note: Protocol Vlog

=== Ukrainian Cup ===
==== Matches ====
Loss

21 August 2024 Round of 32	Karpaty Lviv	3–0	Chornomorets Odesa	Lviv, Ukraine
18:00 EET	Ocheretko 34'; Kuzyk 43'; Chachua 75'	Report		Stadium: Ukraina Stadium; Attendance: 1,930; Referee: N. Dyord (Uzhgorod)
Note: Protocol Vlog

== Statistics ==
- Team statistics for the season 2024–25 (in Ukrainian)

=== Clean sheets ===
The list is sorted by squad number when total clean sheets are equal.

Rank	No.	Player	Domestic League	Domestic Cup	Total
1	1	(Ukraine) Artur Rudko	3	0	3
2	12	(Nigeria) Chijioke Aniagboso	1	0	1
Totals			4	0	4

Source: Protocols of the matches.
