= 2025–26 Ukrainian First League =

Ukrainian First League
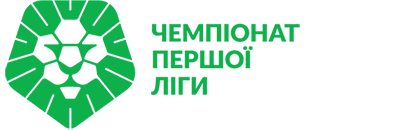
- Season: 2025–26
- Dates: 2 August 2025 – 2 June 2026 (winter break: 30 November 2025 – 20 March 2026)
- Champions: Bukovyna Chernivtsi
- Promoted: Bukovyna Chernivtsi; Chornomorets Odesa; Livyi Bereh Kyiv (play-offs win)
- Relegated: Podillya Khmelnytskyi; Metalurh Zaporizhia; Vorskla Poltava (withdrew)
- Matches: 215
- Goals: 492 (2.29 per match)
- Top goalscorer: Vitaliy Dakhnovskyi (18 goals)
- Biggest home win: Bukovyna 6–0 Vorskla (9 May 2026)
- Biggest away win: Metalurh 0–5 Livyi Bereh (1 November 2025); Metalurh 1–6 Ahrobiznes (19 April 2026)
- Highest scoring: Probiy 3–4 Bukovyna (15 August 2025); Metalurh 1–6 Ahrobiznes (19 April 2026)
- Longest winning run: 13 matches Bukovyna
- Longest unbeaten run: 28 matches Bukovyna
- Longest winless run: 15 matches Metalurh
- Longest losing run: 7 matches Metalurh
- Highest attendance: 5,594; Bukovyna 1–3 Chornomorets (23 May 2026)
- Lowest attendance: 0 (31 matches)
- Total attendance: 109,016
- Average attendance: 592
- All statistics correct as of 26 May 2026.

The 2025–26 Ukrainian First League is the 35th football season of the Ukrainian second-tier competition, PFL Persha Liha (PFL First League or Ukrainian First League), since its establishment. The league competition consisted of 16 teams. The competition is being conducted during the ongoing war with Russia since late February 2022.

== Format ==
It was planned to have 16 teams for this season. The format of the competition changed compared with the previous season. Instead of two groups in the fall and the spring, it was decided that clubs would compete in a straightforward double round robin format.

== Teams ==
This season, the Ukrainian First League consisted of 16 teams.

=== Newcoming teams ===
==== Promoted teams ====
One team received direct promotion, and another won a playoff matchup at the end of the 2024–25 Ukrainian Second League.

- Probiy Horodenka – placed 1st (debut)
- Chernihiv – 3rd placed, play-off winner (returning after one season)

==== Relegated teams ====
Four teams were relegated at the end of the 2024–25 Ukrainian Premier League.

- Chornomorets Odesa – 16th placed (returning after four seasons)
- Inhulets Petrove – 15th placed (returning after a season)
- Livyi Bereh Kyiv – lost play-offs (returning after a season)
- Vorskla Poltava – lost play-offs (returning after 29 seasons)

=== Outgoing teams ===
==== Promoted teams ====
Four teams were promoted to the 2025–26 Ukrainian Premier League.

- Metalist 1925 Kharkiv – promoted after a season in the second tier.
- Epitsentr Kamianets-Podilskyi – promoted for the first time after three seasons in the second tier.
- Poltava – promoted for the first time after three seasons in the second tier.
- Kudrivka – promoted for the first time after a season in the second tier.

==== Relegated teams ====
Three teams were relegated to the 2025–26 Ukrainian Second League, but one withdrew right after it, and another Metalurh Zaporizhzhia was reinstated after the withdrawal of Mynai.

- Kremin Kremenchuk – relegated after six seasons in the second tier and later withdrew.
- Dinaz Vyshhorod – relegated after three seasons in the second tier.

=== Other administrative issues ===
==== Withdrawn teams ====
- Mynai withdrew less than two weeks before the start of the season in the First League. It was replaced by relegated Metalurh Zaporizhzhia, which was preparing to start in the Second League. The club withdrew after a season (2 total) in the second tier.
- One more club withdrew right after the previous season, after it was relegated, which is Kremin Kremenchuk.

==== Renamed teams ====
- On 11 July 2025, Prykarpattia Ivano-Frankivsk was renamed as Prykarpattia-Blaho Ivano-Frankivsk. The company's name in the Latin script is "blago". At the same time, in Cyrillic, the club adopted its name as "Blaho".

=== Location map ===
The following displays the location of teams.

Home venues of teams in the 2025–26 Ukrainian First League.

== Stadiums ==
The following stadiums were used as home grounds for the teams in the competition.

Rank	Stadium	Location	Capacity	Club	Notes
1	Chornomorets	Odesa	34,164	Chornomorets Odesa	
2	Vorskla imeni Butovskoho	Poltava	23,842	Vorskla Poltava	
3	Miskyi imeni Shukhevycha	Ternopil	15,150	Nyva Ternopil	
4	Bukovyna	Chernivtsi	12,000	Bukovyna Chernivtsi	
4	Bukovyna	Chernivtsi	12,000	Metalurh Zaporizhzhia	used as home ground in 1 match
5	Slavutych-Arena	Zaporizhzhia	11,883	Metalurh Zaporizhzhia	
6	Avanhard	Uzhhorod	10,383	Metalist Kharkiv	used as home ground during the season (Note: Due to the Russian invasion of Ukraine (2022).)
7	Podillia	Khmelnytskyi	6,800	Podillia Khmelnytskyi	
8	Rukh	Ivano-Frankivsk	6,500	Prykarpattia-Blaho	
9	Kolos	Boryspil, Kyiv Oblast	5,654	Viktoriya Sumy	used as home ground in 2 matches
10	Arena Livyi Bereh	Zolocha hromada, Kyiv Oblast	4,700	Livyi Bereh Kyiv	
10	Arena Livyi Bereh	Zolocha hromada, Kyiv Oblast	4,700	Vorskla Poltava	used as home ground in 1 match
11	Inhulets Arena	Petrove, Kirovohrad Oblast	4,600	Inhulets Petrove	
12	Skif	Lviv	3,742	Feniks-Mariupol	used as home ground during the season
13	Yunist	Volochysk, Khmelnytskyi Oblast	2,700	Ahrobiznes Volochysk	
14	imeni Tonkocheyeva	Kamianets-Podilskyi, Khmelnytskyi Oblast	2,587	Ahrobiznes Volochysk	used as home ground in 1 match
15	Probiy Arena	Horodenka, Ivano-Frankivsk Oblast	2,500	Probiy Horodenka	
16	imeni Kutsa	Trostianets, Sumy Oblast	1,124	Viktoriya Sumy	used as home ground during the season
17	Yuvileinyi	Bucha, Kyiv Oblast	1,028	UCSA Tarasivka	used as home ground during the season
18	Molodizhnyi	Poltava	680	Vorskla Poltava	
19	Chernihiv Arena	Chernihiv	500	Chernihiv	
20	FC LNZ training base	Heronymivka, Cherkasy Oblast	300	Viktoriya Sumy	used as home ground in 2 matches

== Personnel and sponsorship ==
Team	President	Head coach	Captain	Kit manufacturer	Shirt sponsor
Ahrobiznes Volochysk	Oleh Sobutskyi	Oleksandr Chyzhevskyi	Roman Tolochko	Nike	Агробізнес
Bukovyna Chernivtsi	Andriy Safronyak	Serhiy Shyshchenko	Bohdan Boychuk	Nike	Dmart
Chernihiv	Yuriy Synytsya	Valeriy Chornyi	Maksym Tatarenko	Jako	BETON
Chornomorets Odesa	Oleksandr Hranovskyi	Roman Hryhorchuk	Oleksandr Sklyar	Kelme	Vbet
Feniks-Mariupol	Yuriy Pavlyshyn	Volodymyr Zhuravchak Maksym Feshchuk	Andriy Bohdanov	Kelme	GLOBUS
Inhulets Petrove	Oleksandr Povoroznyuk	Vasyl Kobin	Stanislav-Nuri Malysh	Joma (Note: Given the fact that the company continues to cooperate with Russian clubs, the logo of Joma on the game uniform is disguised by the logo of another sponsor of the club)	П'ятихатська
Livyi Bereh Kyiv	Mykola Lavrenko	Oleksandr Ryabokon	Ruslan Dedukh	Nike	Метало Гальва України
Metalist Kharkiv	Yevhen Krasnikov	Andriy Anishchenko	Vladyslav Rybak	Joma	betking
Metalurh Zaporizhzhia	Maksym Lupashko	Serhiy Kovalets	Andriy Bliznichenko	Kelme	Weltum
Nyva Ternopil	Oleksandr Stadnyk	Yaroslav Matviyiv (caretaker)	Maryan Mysyk	Kelme	Fantazia Group
Podillya Khmelnytskyi	Yevhen Beiderman	Oleksandr Volovyk	Vadym Shavrin	Kelme	Kolvi
Probiy Horodenka	Vitaliy Shevaha	Volodymyr Kovalyuk	Roman Borysevych	Joma	VD
Prykarpattia-Blaho	Serhiy Ptashnyk	Vasyl Yatsurak	Vasyl Tsyutsyura	Joma	blago
UCSA Tarasivka	Serhiy Lesnyk	(Brazil) Anderson Ribeiro	Serhiy Petko	Kelme	—
Viktoriya Sumy	Serhiy Bondarenko	Volodymyr Romanenko (caretaker)	Dmytro Ulyanov	Puma	—
Vorskla Poltava	Maksym Harus (Note: as a general director)	Valeriy Kutsenko (caretaker)	Dmytro Prikhna	Nike	Ferrexpo

=== Managerial changes ===
Team	Outgoing head coach	Manner of departure	Date of vacancy	Table	Incoming head coach	Date of appointment
Vorskla Poltava	Yuriy Maksymov	Mutual consent	9 June 2025	Pre-season	(Serbia) Željko Ljubenović	24 June 2025
Livyi Bereh Kyiv	Vitaliy Pervak	Mutual consent	10 June 2025	Pre-season	Andriy Havryushov	10 June 2025
Bukovyna Chernivtsi	Hryhoriy Churilov (caretaker)	End of caretaker spell	20 June 2025	Pre-season	Serhiy Shyshchenko	20 June 2025
Mynai	Yevhen Kalynychenko	Mutual consent	20 June 2025	Pre-season	Team withdrew	
UCSA Tarasivka	Ivan Ostapov (caretaker)	End of caretaker spell	5 July 2025	Pre-season	(Brazil) Anderson Ribeiro	5 July 2025
Vorskla Poltava	(Serbia) Željko Ljubenović	Mutual consent	10 July 2025	Pre-season	Oleksandr Babych	15 July 2025
Metalurh Zaporizhzhia	Coaching crew (Note: Yuriy Slabyshev, Serhiy Rudyka, and Ruslan Halihuzov (caretakers))	Change of role	1 August 2025	Pre-season	Ruslan Halihuzov (caretaker)	1 August 2025
Feniks-Mariupol	Maksym Feshchuk	Sharing the role	11 September 2025	8th	Volodymyr Zhuravchak and Maksym Feshchuk	11 September 2025
Livyi Bereh Kyiv	Andriy Havryushov	Resigned	23 September 2025	7th	Vyacheslav Nivinskyi (caretaker)	23 September 2025
Livyi Bereh Kyiv	Vyacheslav Nivinskyi (caretaker)	End of interim	7 October 2025	6th	Oleksandr Ryabokon	7 October 2025
Vorskla Poltava	Oleksandr Babych	Sacked	10 October 2025	7th	Valeriy Kutsenko (caretaker)	10 October 2025
Podillya Khmelnytskyi	Serhiy Kovalets	Sacked	21 October 2025	15th	Oleksandr Volovyk (caretaker)	21 October 2025
Nyva Ternopil	Yuriy Virt	Mutual consent	16 December 2025	8th	(Belarus) Oleg Dulub	20 January 2026
Chornomorets Odesa	Oleksandr Kucher	Mutual agreement	13 January 2026	3rd	Roman Hryhorchuk	14 January 2026
Metalurh Zaporizhzhia	Ruslan Halihuzov (caretaker)	End of caretaker spell	15 January 2026	16th	Serhiy Kovalets	15 January 2026
Podillya Khmelnytskyi	Oleksandr Volovyk (caretaker)	Permanent basis	24 February 2026	15th	Oleksandr Volovyk	24 February 2026
Prykarpattya-Blaho	Oleh Rypan	Change of role	9 April 2026	8th	Vasyl Yatsurak	9 April 2026
Nyva Ternopil	(Belarus) Oleg Dulub	Mutual consent	11 May 2026	11th	Yaroslav Matviyiv (caretaker)	17 May 2026
Viktoriya Sumy	Anatoliy Bezsmertnyi	Signed with Dynamo Kyiv	28 May 2026	8th	Volodymyr Romanenko (caretaker)	29 May 2026

== League table ==
Pos	Team	Pld	W	D	L	GF	GA	GD	Pts	Promotion, qualification or relegation
1	Bukovyna Chernivtsi (P, C)	30	26	3	1	74	21	+53	81	Promotion to Ukrainian Premier League
2	Chornomorets Odesa (P)	30	19	8	3	44	20	+24	65	Promotion to Ukrainian Premier League
3	Livyi Bereh Kyiv (O, P)	30	19	6	5	50	21	+29	63	Qualification to promotion play-offs
4	Ahrobiznes Volochysk	30	16	5	9	36	28	+8	53	Qualification to promotion play-offs
5	Inhulets Petrove	30	12	10	8	41	32	+9	46	
6	Prykarpattia-Blaho	30	9	10	11	33	33	0	37	
7	Metalist Kharkiv	30	10	7	13	31	35	−4	37	
8	Probiy Horodenka	30	10	6	14	29	37	−8	36 (Note: Ranked on head-to-head points Head-to-head goal difference Head-to-head goals scored: Probiy Horodenka 12 +3 5, Feniks-Mariupol 10 +3 5, Viktoriya Sumy 4 -3 6, UCSA Tarasivka 4 -3 2)	
9	Feniks-Mariupol	30	9	9	12	31	32	−1	36	
10	Viktoriya Sumy	30	10	6	14	37	38	−1	36	
11	UCSA Tarasivka	30	10	6	14	30	40	−10	36	
12	Nyva Ternopil	30	8	10	12	24	34	−10	34	
13	Chernihiv	30	8	7	15	30	36	−6	31	
14	Vorskla Poltava (W)	30	7	9	14	23	36	−13	30	Denied license
15	Podillya Khmelnytskyi (R)	30	4	9	17	20	45	−25	21	Relegation to Ukrainian Second League
16	Metalurh Zaporizhzhia (R)	30	4	7	19	16	61	−45	19	Relegation to Ukrainian Second League

Source: PFL.ua
Rules for classification: 1) Points; 2) Head-to-head points; 3) Head-to-head goal difference; 4) Head-to-head goals scored; 5) Goal difference in all games; 6) Goals scored in all games (Note: calculation by criteria indicated in rules 2, 3, 4 is conducted with consideration of all teams that have an equal number of tournament points at the moment of calculation and not only among those which after preliminary criteria have appeared more successful).
(C) Champions; (O) Relegation play-offs winner; (P) Promoted; (R) Relegated; (W) Denied license for the next season

=== Match results ===
Home \ Away	AHR	BUK	CHE	CHO	FMA	INH	LBK	MET	MTZ	NVT	POD	PRO	PRY	UCS	VKT	VOR
Ahrobiznes		0–3	1–0	1–2	1–0	1–0	2–0	1–0	3–0	0–0	2–1	0–3	3–1	1–0	1–0	2–0
Bukovyna	0–0		4–1	1–3	2–1	1–1	2–1	2–0	3–0	1–0	2–0	3–1	3–1	4–1	2–0	6–0
Chernihiv	0–2	0–1		2–2	1–4	1–2	4–0 (Note: The round 5 match Chernihiv v Livyi Bereh that was scheduled to take place on September 6, 2025, did not even start due to an extended air raid alert over the north-eastern portions of Ukraine and had to be postponed. On 24 October 2025, the General Director of FC Chernihiv informed in an interview that the replay of the match was scheduled to take place on November 12, 2025.)	1–2 (Note: The round 7 match Chernihiv v Metalist that was scheduled to take place on September 21, 2025, did not even start due to an extended air raid alert and had to be postponed. On 24 October 2025, the General Director of FC Chernihiv informed in an interview that his club is seeking to convince the federation administration that Metalist deserved to receive a technical loss. On May 6, 2026, information appeared that Chernihiv filed a case against Metalist, UAF, and PFL in Lausanne, the Court of Arbitration for Sport. On May 9, it became known that FC Chernihiv lost the case in CAS so that the match can be played. The game has finally taken place on 26 May 2026, although with some delay due to another air raid from the Russian Federation.)	1–1 (Note: The round 13 match Chernihiv v Metalurh that was scheduled to take place on October 24, 2025, did not even start due to an extended air raid alert and had to be postponed. On 5 November 2025, it was announced that the game was scheduled to take place on December 4, 2025. The game between Chernihiv and Metalurh could not start on December 4 due to air raid sirens and was postponed again, on 15 December.)	1–0	1–1	3–0 (Note: The round 16 match Chernihiv v Probiy that was scheduled to take place on November 16, 2025, did not even start due to an extended air raid alert and had to be postponed. Just as the situation with Metalist, Probiy also did not wait for more than an hour before departing back home. It was rescheduled for 9 December.)	1–0	2–0	1–2	1–2
Chornomorets	1–0	1–2	1–0		2–0	2–0	0–0	1–0	3–0	3–0 (Note: The round 1 match Chornomorets vs Nyva that took place on August 2, 2025, ended in a 2–1 victory for the Odesa club, but on the UAF CDC decision on August 7, 2025, it was changed to 3–0 because of an ineligible player in the referee report. Nyva Ternopil was fined for 25,000 hryvnia.)	4–1	1–0	3–0	1–0	0–0	0–0
Feniks-Mariupol	4–0	2–3	1–0	1–1		1–1	1–0	0–1	2–1	0–2	0–1	0–0	0–2	1–1	2–0	2–0
Inhulets	3–2	0–0	1–1	2–3	2–0		1–3	3–0	0–0	2–2	0–3	3–1	0–0	0–2	4–2	3–0
Livyi Bereh	4–1	1–3	1–1	1–1	3–1	1–0		3–0	4–0	0–0	1–0	3–1	2–1	3–1	3–0	2–0
Metalist	0–1	1–2	2–1	1–1	1–1	1–2	0–1		1–0	1–2	3–0	1–1	2–2	2–0	2–1	1–1
Metalurh	1–6	0–4	0–0 (Note: The round 28 match between Metalurh and Chernihiv was scheduled for May 15, 2026, but was postponed by a day due to a Russian air raid. The game finally took place on 29 May 2026, although with some delay due to another air raid from the Russian Federation.)	0–1	1–1	0–0	0–5	1–3 (Note: The round 1 match Metalurh v Metalist was scheduled to take place on August 3, 2025, but at the request of Metalist, it has been postponed by the Professional Football League as the club delegated four of its players to the Ukraine national under-19 team. The match was rescheduled for September 25, 2025.)		2–2 (Note: The round 17 match Metalurh v Nyva was scheduled to take place on November 22, 2025, but was stopped and postponed during a play due to an extended air raid sirens. The match was played out from the 76th minute on December 7, 2025, and Nyva Ternopil managed to score, saving themselves from a loss.)	1–1	0–1	0–3	0–3	0–3 (Note: The round 26 match between Metalurh and Viktoriya was scheduled for May 3, 2026, but was postponed by a day due to a Russian air raid.)	2–0
Nyva	0–0	1–2	2–0	0–1	0–3	0–1	0–0	2–0	1–0		0–1	0–0	1–1	1–4	2–1	1–1
Podillya	0–1	0–2	0–0	0–2	0–0	1–5	0–2	0–2	3–0	1–2		1–1	0–3 (Note: Administrative score. The round 8 match Podillya v Prykarpattia-Blaho that took place on September 28, 2025, and ended in a 2–1 victory for Podillya, was reviewed by the UAF Control and Disciplinary Commission. On 2 October 2025, the result of the match was scratched and replaced with a technical loss to Podillya (0:3) and a technical victory for Prykarpattia-Blaho (3:0), as Podillya submitted a footballer's name to the referee report, who was disqualified.)	1–2	1–2	1–1
Probiy	1–0	3–4	1–0	0–2	0–0	0–1	0–2	1–2	3–1	1–2	3–0		0–3	1–0	3–2	0–2
Prykarpattia-Blaho	1–1	1–2	0–3	1–1	3–0	0–2	0–0	0–0	0–1	1–1	1–1	1–0		1–2	1–1	1–0
UCSA	2–1	0–5	0–2	0–1	0–0	0–0	0–1	2–1	1–3	3–0	1–0	0–0	3–1		1–1	1–1
Viktoriya	1–2	1–3	3–0	4–0	1–2	2–2	1–2	1–0	3–0	1–0	0–0	0–1	0–2	2–0		1–0
Vorskla	0–0	0–2	0–1	3–0	2–1	2–0	0–1 (Note: The round 26 match between Vorskla and Livyi Bereh was scheduled for May 2, 2026, but was postponed by a day due to a Russian air raid.)	1–1	0–1	2–0	1–1	0–2	0–1	3–0	1–1	

Source: Calendar (in Ukrainian)
Legend: Blue = home team win; Yellow = draw; Red = away team win.

=== Match results by week ===
Team ╲ Round	1	2	3	4	5	6	7	8	9	10	11	12	13	14	15	16	17	18	19	20	21	22	23	24	25	26	27	28	29	30
Ahrobiznes	W	D	W	D	W	D	W	L	W	L	W	L	W	W	W	L	L	W	D	W	W	L	L	W	W	L	L	W	D	W
Bukovyna	D	D	W	W	W	W	W	W	W	W	W	W	W	W	W	D	W	W	W	W	W	W	W	W	W	W	W	W	L	W
Chernihiv	L	L	W	L	L	L	L	D	W	W	L	D	L	D	L	W	W	D	L	W	L	L	W	D	L	W	D	D	L	L
Chornomorets	W	W	D	W	W	W	W	W	W	D	D	W	D	L	D	W	W	L	W	D	W	W	W	W	L	W	D	D	W	W
Feniks	L	L	D	W	L	W	D	L	L	L	L	L	D	L	W	W	L	D	W	D	L	W	L	D	D	W	W	D	D	W
Inhulets	D	W	D	W	W	D	L	D	W	W	W	W	W	D	L	D	W	W	L	L	L	L	D	D	L	W	D	D	W	L
Livyi Bereh	L	W	W	W	L	L	W	D	W	W	W	D	W	W	D	W	W	W	D	L	W	L	W	D	W	W	W	D	W	W
Metalist	L	L	D	L	D	W	W	L	L	W	L	W	D	L	D	W	L	L	W	W	D	W	L	L	D	L	W	D	W	L
Metalurh	L	D	W	L	L	D	L	D	L	L	L	L	L	L	L	D	L	D	W	W	L	L	D	L	L	L	W	D	L	L
Nyva	L	W	D	D	W	W	D	W	D	L	W	W	L	L	L	L	D	L	D	D	L	D	L	D	L	W	L	W	D	L
Podillya	L	L	D	L	L	D	D	L	D	L	L	L	W	W	D	L	L	W	W	L	L	L	D	D	L	L	L	L	D	D
Probiy	W	L	L	D	L	D	L	D	L	W	L	W	D	W	L	L	L	L	L	D	W	W	W	L	W	L	W	D	W	L
Prykarpattia	W	W	L	L	L	D	D	W	W	L	D	W	L	L	W	D	W	L	D	L	D	D	D	W	L	L	L	D	D	W
UCSA	W	L	D	L	W	D	L	D	L	W	L	L	L	W	W	W	D	D	L	L	W	W	L	D	W	L	L	L	L	W
Viktoriya	L	W	L	L	W	L	D	D	W	D	W	L	L	L	L	D	W	L	L	L	W	W	W	D	W	W	D	L	L	L
Vorskla	W	W	D	L	L	D	W	D	L	L	L	L	D	W	D	L	D	W	L	W	L	L	L	L	W	L	L	D	D	D

Source: pfl.ua
W = Win; D = Draw; L = Loss

== Statistics ==
=== Goalscorers ===
As of 2 June 2026

Rank	Scorer	Team	Goals (Pen.)
1	Vitaliy Dakhnovskyi	Bukovyna Chernivtsi	18 (4)
2	Andriy Khoma	Prykarpattia-Blaho → Chornomorets	14 (1)
2	Maksym Voytikhovskyi	Ahrobiznes → Bukovyna	14 (2)
4	Vitaliy Farasyeyenko	Inhulets → Chornomorets	12 (2)
5	Roman Kuzmyn	Ahrobiznes Volochysk	10 (0)
5	Serhiy Kyslenko	Inhulets → Feniks-Mariupol	10 (0)
7	Yevhen Pidlepenets	Bukovyna Chernivtsi	8 (0)
7	Vladyslav Herych	Chornomorets Odesa	8 (1)
9	4 player(s)		7
13	6 player(s)		6
19	12 player(s)		5
31	17 player(s)		4
48	24 player(s)		3
72	49 player(s)		2
121	75 player(s)		1
0	own goal(s)		19

- Own goal(s):
- Dmytro Sabiyev (UCSA Tarasivka vs Chornomorets)
- Serhiy Kyslenko (Inhulets Petrove vs Chornomorets)
- Mykhaylo Rudavskyi (Metalurh Zaporizhia vs Metalist)
- Milan Mykhalchuk (Nyva Ternopil vs Metalist)
- Roman Bilyi (Feniks-Mariupol vs Ahrobiznes)
- Nazar Lys (Podillya Khmelnytskyi vs Metalist)
- Nazar Balaba (UCSA Tarasivka vs Bukovyna)
- Yehor Popravka (UCSA Tarasivka vs Metalist)
- Denys Doroshenko (Metalurh Zaporizhia vs Livyi Bereh)
- Bohdan Porokh (Metalist Kharkiv vs Chornomorets)
- Vladyslav Klymenko (Metalurh Zaporizhia vs Nyva)
- Vitaliy Horin (Feniks-Mariupol vs Prykarpattia-Blaho)
- Stanislav Sharay (Viktoriya Sumy vs Livyi Bereh)
- Andriy Demydenko (Nyva Ternopil vs Inhulets)
- (Brazil) Sidnney (Livyi Bereh Kyiv vs Bukovyna)
- Yevhen Yanovich (Inhulets Petrove vs Feniks-Mariupol)
- Oleksiy Zhdanovych (UCSA Tarasivka vs Bukovyna)
- (Nigeria) Prince Chisom Chibueze (Vorskla Poltava vs Podillya)
- Maksym Vorona (Metalurh Zaporizhia vs Bukovyna)

=== Hat-tricks ===
As of 9 May 2026

Player	For	Against	Result	Date
(Ukraine) Vyacheslav Koydan	Chernihiv	Prykarpattia-Blaho	0–3 (A)	17 August 2025
(Ukraine) Bohdan Boychuk	Bukovyna	Chernihiv	4–1 (H)	12 September 2025
(Ukraine) Oleksiy Khoblenko	Chornomorets Odesa	Metalurh Zaporizhzhia	3–0 (H)	13 September 2025
(Ukraine) Vitaliy Farasyeyenko	Inhulets Petrove	Viktoriya Sumy	4–2 (H)	19 October 2025
(Ukraine) Nazariy Nych	Ahrobiznes Volochysk	Metalurh Zaporizhia	6–1 (A)	19 April 2026
(Ukraine) Vitaliy Dakhnovskyi	Bukovyna Chernivtsi	Vorskla Poltava	6–0 (H)	9 May 2026

=== Clean sheets ===
As of 2 June 2026

Rank	Player	Club	Clean sheets
1	(Nigeria) Chijioke Aniagboso	Chornomorets Odesa	17
2	Roman Zhmurko	Livyi Bereh Kyiv	15
3	Andriy Bobynets	Prykarpattia-Blaho	12
4	Anton Zhylkin	Inhulets Petrove	11
5	2 player(s)		10
7	2 player(s)		9
9	1 player(s)		8
10	2 player(s)		7
12	3 player(s)		6
15	3 player(s)		5
18	3 player(s)		4
21	3 player(s)		3
24	6 player(s)		1

== Awards ==
=== Monthly awards ===
Month	Player of the Month		Awarded by	Ref.
Month	Player	Club	Awarded by	Ref.
August 2025	(Brazil) Sidnney	Livyi Bereh Kyiv	Ukrfootball.ua	
August 2025	Yaroslav Rakitskyi	Chornomorets Odesa	PFL press service	
September 2025	Oleksiy Khoblenko	Chornomorets Odesa	PFL press service	
October 2025	Maksym Voytikhovskyi	Ahrobiznes Volochysk	PFL press service	
November 2025	Yevhen Pidlepenets	Bukovyna Chernivtsi	PFL press service	
April 2026	Vitaliy Dakhnovskyi	Bukovyna Chernivtsi	PFL press service	
May 2026				

=== Round awards ===
Round	Player			Coach		
Round	Player	Club	Reference	Coach	Club	Reference
Round 1	(Ukraine) Maksym Voytikhovskyi	Ahrobiznes Volochysk		(Ukraine) Oleksandr Chyzhevskyi	Ahrobiznes Volochysk	
Round 2	(Ukraine) Yaroslav Rakitskyi	Chornomorets Odesa		(Ukraine) Oleh Rypan	Prykarpattia Ivano-Frankivsk	
Round 3	(Ukraine) Vyacheslav Koydan	FC Chernihiv		(Ukraine) Valeriy Chornyi	FC Chernihiv	
Round 4	(Ukraine) Vitaliy Farasyeyenko	Inhulets Petrove		(Ukraine) Vasyl Kobin	Inhulets Petrove	
Round 5	(Ukraine) Maryan Mysyk	Nyva Ternopil		(Ukraine) Vasyl Kobin (2)	Inhulets Petrove	
Round 6	(Ukraine) Bohdan Boychuk	Bukovyna Chernivtsi		(Ukraine) Oleksandr Kucher	Chornomorets Odesa	
Round 7	(Ukraine) Oleksiy Khoblenko	Chornomorets Odesa		(Ukraine) Serhiy Shyshchenko	Bukovyna Chernivtsi	
Round 8	(Ukraine) Vitaliy Dakhnovskyi	Bukovyna Chernivtsi		(Ukraine) Serhiy Kovalets	Podillya Khmelnytskyi	
Round 9	(Ukraine) Maksym Voytikhovskyi (2)	Ahrobiznes Volochysk		(Ukraine) Oleksandr Kucher (2)	Chornomorets Odesa	
Round 10	(Ukraine) Maksym Tatarenko	FC Chernihiv		(Ukraine) Valeriy Chornyi (2)	FC Chernihiv	
Round 11	(Ukraine) Maksym Yevpak	Viktoriya Sumy		(Ukraine) Serhiy Shyshchenko (2)	Bukovyna Chernivtsi	
Round 12	(Ukraine) Vitaliy Farasyeyenko (2)	Inhulets Petrove		(Ukraine) Volodymyr Kovalyuk	Probiy Horodenka	
Round 13	(Ukraine) Roman Kuzmyn	Ahrobiznes Volochysk		(Ukraine) Oleksandr Chyzhevskyi (2)	Ahrobiznes Volochysk	
Round 14	(Brazil) Diego Henrique	Livyi Bereh Kyiv		(Ukraine) Serhiy Shyshchenko (3)	Bukovyna Chernivtsi	
Round 15	(Paraguay) Pablo Castro	UCSA Tarasivka		(Ukraine) Oleksandr Ryabokon	Livyi Bereh Kyiv	
Round 16	(Ukraine) Artur Remenyak	Feniks-Mariupol		(Brazil) Anderson Ribeiro	UCSA Tarasivka	
Round 17	(Ukraine) Stanislav-Nuri Malysh	Inhulets Petrove		(Ukraine) Anatoliy Bezsmertnyi	Viktoriya Sumy	
Round 18	(Ukraine) Yevhen Pidlepenets	Bukovyna Chernivtsi		(Ukraine) Valeriy Kutsenko	Vorskla Poltava	
winter break
Round 19	(Ukraine) Oleksandr Tsvirenko	Metalist Kharkiv		(Ukraine) Oleksandr Volovyk	Podillya Khmelnytskyi	
Round 20	(Ukraine) Andriy Novikov	FC Chernihiv		(Ukraine) Valeriy Chornyi (3)	FC Chernihiv	
Round 21	(Ukraine) Andriy Fesenko	Probiy Horodenka		(Ukraine) Volodymyr Kovalyuk (2)	Probiy Horodenka	
Round 22	(Ukraine) Serhiy Kyslenko	Feniks-Mariupol		(Ukraine) Andriy Anishchenko	Metalist Kharkiv	
Round 23	(Ukraine) Vikentiy Voloshyn	Livyi Bereh Kyiv		(Ukraine) Oleksandr Ryabokon (2)	Livyi Bereh Kyiv	
Round 24	(Ukraine) Nazariy Nych	Ahrobiznes Volochysk		(Ukraine) Serhiy Shyshchenko (4)	Bukovyna Chernivtsi	
Round 25	(Ukraine) Artem Shpyryonok	Viktoriya Sumy		(Ukraine) Anatoliy Bezsmertnyi (2)	Viktoriya Sumy	
Round 26	(Ukraine) Vladyslav Herych	Chornomorets Odesa		(Ukraine) Maksym Feshchuk	Feniks-Mariupol	
Round 27	(Ukraine) Vitaliy Dakhnovskyi (2)	Bukovyna Chernivtsi		(Ukraine) Serhiy Kovalets (2)	Metalurh Zaporizhzhya	
Round 28	(Ukraine) Ivan Tyshchenko	Bukovyna Chernivtsi		(Ukraine) Yaroslav Matviyiv	Nyva Ternopil	
Round 29	(Brazil) Wendell	Livyi Bereh Kyiv		(Ukraine) Roman Hryhorchuk	Chornomorets Odesa	
Round 30	(Ukraine) Vitaliy Hrusha	Bukovyna Chernivtsi		(Ukraine) Vasyl Yatsurak	Prykarpattya-Blaho	

== Post-season play-offs ==
=== Relegation play-offs ===
The relegation–promotion play-off games were expected to be scheduled to take place between the 13th- and 14th-placed teams with the third- and fourth-placed teams of the Second League. The draw was held on May 14, 2026. Following the withdrawal of Rukh Lviv in the Premier League, relegation play-offs were reduced, but later were canceled as Vorskla Poltava failed to receive the Professional Football League license for the next season. The third and fourth-placed teams of the Second League had received direct promotion to the First League.

=== Promotion play-offs ===
Teams that placed 13th and 14th in the 2025–26 Ukrainian Premier League play a two-leg play-off with the third and fourth teams of the 2025–26 Ukrainian First League.

The withdrawn 14th-placed Rukh Lviv (Note: The participation of FC Rukh in the relegation playoffs is to be confirmed, since the owner announced that the club may not participate in that stage.) was replaced with the 15th-placed FC Oleksandriya.

This round includes 2 clubs from the Premier League: FC Oleksandriya and Kudrivka; 2 clubs from the First League: Livyi Bereh Kyiv and Ahrobiznes Volochysk.

Premier League teams	Agg.	First League teams	1st leg	2nd leg
FC Oleksandriya	1–2	Livyi Bereh Kyiv	1–1	0–1
Kudrivka	2–2 (3–2 p)	Ahrobiznes Volochysk	0–0	2–2

=== First Semi-final ===
5 June 2025
15:30

FC Oleksandriya	1–1	Livyi Bereh Kyiv
Yade 21'	Report	Voloshyn 51'

CSC Nika, Oleksandriya
Attendance: 1170
Referee: Oleksiy Derevinskyi (Khmelnytskyi)

9 June 2026
15:30

Livyi Bereh Kyiv	1–0	FC Oleksandriya
Banada 45'	Report

Arena Livyi Bereh, Kyiv
Attendance: 1285
Referee: Dmytro Panchyshyn (Kharkiv)

Livyi Bereh Kyiv won 2–1 on aggregate and promotion to Premier League.

==== Second Semi-final ====
5 June 2026
18:00

Kudrivka	0–0	Ahrobiznes Volochysk
	Report

Avanhard, Rivne
Attendance: 75
Referee: Vitaliy Romanov (Dnipro)

9 June 2026
18:00

Ahrobiznes Volochysk	2–2	Kudrivka
B. Kozak 70'; Tolochko 90+1' (p)	Report	Machelyuk 39'; Lyehostayev 81'
Penalties
Havrushko (penalty missed); B.Kozak (penalty scored); Riznyk (penalty missed); Nyzhnyk (penalty scored); Tolochko (penalty missed)	2–3	(penalty missed) Veklyak; (penalty scored) Dumanyuk; (penalty scored) Machelyuk; (penalty missed) Hlushchenko; (penalty scored) Lyehostayev

Ternopilskyi miskyi imeni Shukhevycha, Ternopil
Attendance: 2500
Referee: Oleksandr Shandor (Lviv)

2–2 on aggregate; Kudrivka won 3–2 on penalties

== Number of teams by region ==
Number	Region	Team(s)
2	Ivano-Frankivsk Oblast	Probiy Horodenka and Prykarpattia Ivano-Frankivsk
2	Khmelnytskyi Oblast	Ahrobiznes Volochysk and Podillya Khmelnytskyi
1	Chernihiv Oblast	Chernihiv
1	Chernivtsi Oblast	Bukovyna Chernivtsi
1	Kharkiv Oblast	Metalist Kharkiv
1	Kirovohrad Oblast	Inhulets Petrove
1	Kyiv	Livyi Bereh Kyiv
1	Kyiv Oblast	UCSA Tarasivka
1	Lviv Oblast	Feniks-Mariupol Lviv
1	Odesa Oblast	Chornomorets Odesa
1	Poltava Oblast	Vorskla Poltava
1	Sumy Oblast	Viktoriya Sumy
1	Ternopil Oblast	Nyva Ternopil
1	Zaporizhia Oblast	Metalurh Zaporizhzhia

== See also ==
- Football in Ukraine
- 2025–26 Ukrainian Cup
- 2025–26 Ukrainian Premier League
- 2025–26 Ukrainian Second League
- 2025–26 Ukrainian Amateur Cup
- 2025–26 Ukrainian Football Amateur League
- 2025–26 Ukrainian Premier League Under-19
- 2025–26 Ukrainian Women's Top League
- List of Ukrainian football transfers summer 2025
- List of Ukrainian football transfers winter 2025–26
