= Vitaliy Farasyeyenko =

Ukrainian footballer

Personal information
- Full name: Vitaliy Leonidovych Farasyeyenko
- Date of birth: 9 May 2003 (age 23)
- Place of birth: Odesa, Ukraine
- Height: 1.69 m (5 ft 7 in)
- Position: Midfielder

Team information
- Current team: Chornomorets Odesa
- Number: 13

Youth career
- 2016–2017: Shakhtar Donetsk
- 2017–2018: Chornomorets Odesa
- 2018–2020: DYuSSh-11 Chornomorets Odesa
- 2020: MFA Mukachevo

Senior career*
Years	Team	Apps	(Gls)
2020–2022	MFA Mukachevo	29	(2)
2022–2025	Bukovyna Chernivtsi	41	(4)
2025–2026	Inhulets Petrove	30	(12)
2026–	Chornomorets Odesa	14	(2)
- * Club domestic league appearances and goals ‡ National team caps and goals as of 30 August 2026

Vitaliy Leonidovych Farasyeyenko (Ukrainian: Віталій Леонідович Фарасєєнко; born 9 May 2003) is a Ukrainian professional footballer who plays as a midfielder for Ukrainian club Chornomorets Odesa.

== Playing career ==
Farasyeyenko started his football career in 2016–2020 in competitions of the Ukrainian Youth Football League, where he played for Shakhtar Donetsk academy, Chornomorets Odesa academy, and DYuSSh-11 Chornomorets Odesa. His first coach was Oleksandr Suprun. In one of his interviews, Farasyeyenko also said that he was to play for MFA Mukachevo in the Ukrainian Youth Football League, but the competitions were canceled due to the COVID-19 situation in Ukraine.

=== MFA Mukachevo ===
In 2020, he joined MFA Mukachevo, which entered the competitions of the Ukrainian Football Amateur League (4th tier). Farasyeyenko played 16 league games and scored 2 goals. In its group, MFA Mukachevo placed 8th among 9 teams and was admitted to national professional competitions at the Ukrainian Second League.

On 31 July 2021, Farasyeyenko made his debut in professional football, when MFA Mukachevo was visiting Bukovyna Chernivtsi during the 2021–22 Ukrainian Second League season. He came on as a substitute for Taras Halas in the 78th minute. MFA Mukachevo won the match 1:0 after a late goal from Maksym Hirnyi. He was not able to play the full season due to the 2022 Russian invasion of Ukraine. When football competitions resumed in late summer of 2022, MFA Mukachevo chose not to continue their participation in professional competitions.

=== Bukovyna Chernivtsi ===
In 2022, Farasyeyenko signed with Bukovyna Chernivtsi, which was admitted to the 2022–23 Ukrainian First League after football competitions resumed in Ukraine. On 27 August 2022, he made his debut in the First League, when Bukovyna was hosting Epitsentr Kamianets-Podilskyi. During his first season in Bukovyna, Farasyeyenko played 18 matches. His first goal in the First League, Farasyeyenko scored the next season on 9 September 2023, when Bukovyna was visiting Epitsentr. The next week, Farasyeyenko scored again and was noted in the Ukrainian internet media as the round's best young player. During one of training sessions before the match against Hirnyk-Sport Horishni Plavni on 13 April 2024, Farasyeyenko was injured. It was announced that the player would be out for the next 6–7 weeks. During the 2023–24 season, Farasyeyenko played 21 league games and scored 4 goals. During the first half of the 2024–25 Ukrainian First League season, Farasyeyenko almost did not play and before the winter break accumulated only 2 matches on record.

=== Inhulets Petrove ===
On 7 February 2025, Inhulets Petrove, which participated in the 2024–25 Ukrainian Premier League, presented several new players, among which was Farasyeyenko. On 22 February 2025, he made his debut in the Ukrainian Premier League, when Inhulets was hosting Polissya. His first goal in the Ukrainian Premier League, Farasyeyenko scored on 12 May 2025 when Inhulets was hosting Livyi Bereh Kyiv. At the end of the season, Inhulets was relegated and entered the 2025–26 Ukrainian First League. Already in the First League, Farasyeyenko scored his first hat-trick on 19 October 2025, when Inhulets was hosting Viktoriya Sumy. During the first half of the season, Farasyeyenko was recognized as the round's hero (Ukrainian: Герой туру) twice and before the winter break shared the first place on the league's top scorers list with Maksym Voytikhovskyi.

=== Chornomorets Odesa ===
On 3 February 2026, Chornomorets Odesa announced the signing of Vitaliy Farasyeyenko. On 23 May 2026 in the 29th round match of the Ukrainian First League between Bukovyna and Chornomorets he scored his first goal as a player of Chornomorets.

== Honours ==
Chornomorets Odesa

- Ukrainian First League runner-up: 2025–26
