= Denys Ryabyi =

Ukrainian footballer

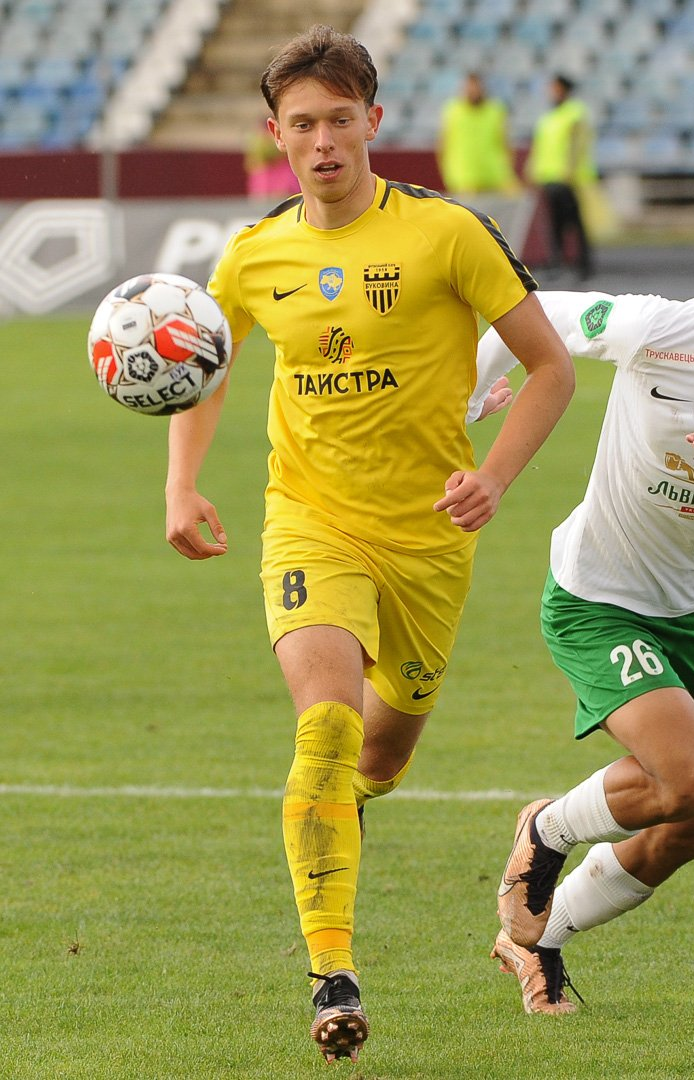

Personal information
- Full name: Denys Vladyslavovych Ryabyi
- Date of birth: 4 August 2001 (age 25)
- Place of birth: Chernivtsi, Ukraine
- Height: 1.80 m (5 ft 11 in)
- Position: Left back

Team information
- Current team: Viktoriya Sumy
- Number: 28

Youth career
- 2014–2020: Bukovyna Chernivtsi

Senior career*
Years	Team	Apps	(Gls)
2019	Dovbush Chernivtsi	0	(0)
2020–2024	Bukovyna Chernivtsi	55	(0)
2024–	Viktoriya Sumy	31	(2)
- * Club domestic league appearances and goals as of 4 June 2026

Denys Vladyslavovych Ryabyi (Ukrainian: Денис Владиславович Рябий; born 4 August 2001) is a Ukrainian professional footballer who plays as a left back for Ukrainian club Viktoriya Sumy.

== Personal life ==
He is the twin brother of Artem Ryabyi.
