= Oleksandr Lebedenko =

Ukrainian footballer

Personal information
- Full name: Oleksandr Viktorovych Lebedenko
- Date of birth: 13 August 1989 (age 37)
- Place of birth: Krasnopillia, Ukrainian SSR
- Height: 1.70 m (5 ft 7 in)
- Position: Striker

Team information
- Current team: Viktoriya Sumy
- Number: 11

Youth career
- 2001–2006: Yavir Krasnopilya

Senior career*
Years	Team	Apps	(Gls)
2006–2009	Yavir Krasnopilya	75	(4)
2011–2016	Sumy	121	(18)
2016	Illichivets Mariupol	18	(2)
2017	Poltava	13	(1)
2017	Sumy	22	(3)
2018	Helios Kharkiv	9	(1)
2018–2019	Polissya Zhytomyr	12	(0)
2020–2022	Alians Lypova Dolyna	40	(1)
2022–2023	Veres Rivne	29	(1)
2023–	Viktoriya Sumy	48	(2)
- * Club domestic league appearances and goals as of 4 June 2026

Oleksandr Viktorovych Lebedenko (Ukrainian: Олександр Вікторович Лебеденко; born 13 August 1989) is a Ukrainian football striker, who plays for Viktoriya Sumy in the Ukrainian First League.

== Career ==
Lebedenko is a product of his native town's FC Yavir Krasnopilya youth sportive school systems.

After the spending 15 years of his career in all age levels representations of FC Yavir – FC Sumy, in July 2016 he signed 1 year deal with the Ukrainian First League club FC Illichivets Mariupol.
