= Mahomed Kratov =

Ukrainian footballer

Personal information
- Full name: Mahomed Vadymovych Kratov
- Date of birth: 30 June 2004 (age 22)
- Place of birth: Sudak, Ukraine
- Height: 1.90 m (6 ft 3 in)
- Position: Centre-back

Team information
- Current team: Chornomorets Odesa
- Number: 4

Youth career
- 2017–2018: Zirka Kyiv
- 2018–2019: DYuSSh-26 Kyiv
- 2019–2020: Zmina-Obolon Kyiv
- 2020–2021: Lokomotyv Kyiv

Senior career*
Years	Team	Apps	(Gls)
2023–2025	Lokomotyv Kyiv	20	(2)
2025–	Chornomorets Odesa	13	(0)
- * Club domestic league appearances and goals as of 12 April 2026

Mahomed Vadymovych Kratov (Ukrainian: Магомед Вадимович Кратов; born 30 June 2004) is a Ukrainian professional footballer who plays as a centre-back for Ukrainian club Chornomorets Odesa. He is a product of the Zirka Kyiv amateur team academy. Kratov has Crimean Tatar roots.

== Career ==
=== Chornomorets Odesa ===
On 18 January 2025, Kratov joined Chornomorets Odesa, signing a contract with the Sailors on a 1+1 basis. On 21 February 2025 in the 18th round match of the 2024–25 Ukrainian Premier League between Kolos Kovalivka and Chornomorets he made his official debut as a player of Chornomorets. At the beginning of 2026, Kratov underwent a trial at the German Schalke 04, but a contract with the German club was not signed.

== Honours ==
Chornomorets Odesa

- Ukrainian First League runner-up: 2025–26
