= Moses Jarju =

Gambian professional footballer (born 2003)

Personal information
- Date of birth: 5 October 2003 (age 23)
- Place of birth: Gambia
- Height: 1.87 m (6 ft 2 in)
- Position: Centre-back

Team information
- Current team: Chornomorets Odesa
- Number: 24

Senior career*
Years	Team	Apps	(Gls)
2019–2023	Fortune		
2023–2024	Polissya Zhytomyr	0	(0)
2024	→ Zviahel (loan)	2	(0)
2024	→ Polissya-2 Zhytomyr	0	(0)
2024–	Chornomorets Odesa	46	(1)
2025–	→ Chornomorets-2 Odesa	4	(0)

International career
2023–	Gambia U20	6	(1)
- * Club domestic league appearances and goals as of 7 November 2026

Moses Jarju (born 5 October 2003) is a Gambian professional footballer who plays as a centre-back for Ukrainian club Chornomorets Odesa.

== Club career ==
In 2020, Jarju started his career at Fortune Football Club. On 19 September 2021, he played one match in CAF Champions League during the preliminary round against ES Sétif replacing Assan Njie at the 73 minute.

In 2023, due to the limited playing opportunities on the horizon, Jarju joined Zviahel in the Ukrainian Second League.

On 20 August 2024, Jarju joined Ukrainian Premier League side Chornomorets Odesa and signed a two-year deal with the club from Odesa. He made his debut against LNZ Cherkasy on 28 September 2024. On 10 May 2025, he scored his first goal with the new club against Vorskla Poltava at the Butovsky Vorskla Stadium in Poltava. In June 2026, he extended his contract with the club.

== International career ==
In 2023, Jarju was called up by the Gambia under-20 team for the U-20 Africa Cup of Nations where he played five matches and scored one goal and reached the final, eventually losing to Senegal 2–0. In 2023, he was again called up by the Gambia under-20 side for the 2023 FIFA U-20 World Cup.

== Career statistics ==
=== Club ===
As of match played 7 November 2026

Appearances and goals by club, season and competition
Club	Season	League			Cup		Continental		Other		Total	
Club	Season	Division	Apps	Goals	Apps	Goals	Apps	Goals	Apps	Goals	Apps	Goals
Polissya Zhytomyr	2023–24	Ukrainian Premier League	0	0	0	0	0	0	0	0	0	0
Zviahel	2023–24	Ukrainian Second League	2	0	2	0	0	0	0	0	4	0
Chornomorets Odesa	2024–25	Ukrainian Premier League	15	1	0	0	0	0	0	0	15	1
Chornomorets Odesa	2025–26	Ukrainian First League	20	0	1	0	0	0	0	0	21	0
Chornomorets Odesa	2026–27	Ukrainian Premier League	11	0	1	0	0	0	0	0	12	0
Chornomorets-2 Odesa (Loan)	2025–26	Ukrainian Second League	4	0	0	0	0	0	0	0	4	0
Career total			52	1	4	0	0	0	0	0	56	1

== Honours ==
Chornomorets Odesa

- Ukrainian First League runner-up: 2025–26
