= Oleksandr Chernov =

Ukrainian footballer

Personal information
- Full name: Oleksandr Volodymyrovych Chernov
- Date of birth: 13 July 2002 (age 24)
- Place of birth: Sarny, Ukraine
- Height: 1.74 m (5 ft 9 in)
- Position: Right midfielder

Team information
- Current team: Viktoriya Sumy
- Number: 9

Youth career
- 2015: Mayak Sarny
- 2016–2017: KOLIFKS Kostopil
- 2017–2018: VIK-Volyn Volodymyr-Volynskyi
- 2018: Mayak Sarny
- 2018–2019: VIK-Volyn Volodymyr-Volynskyi

Senior career*
Years	Team	Apps	(Gls)
2019–2022	Volyn Lutsk	20	(0)
2020–2021	→ Volyn-2 Lutsk	20	(1)
2022–2026	Obolon Kyiv	37	(1)
2025	→ Viktoriya Sumy (loan)	24	(2)
2026–	Viktoriya Sumy	11	(1)
- * Club domestic league appearances and goals as of 4 June 2026

Oleksandr Volodymyrovych Chernov (Ukrainian: Олександр Володимирович Чернов; born 13 July 2002) is a Ukrainian professional footballer who plays as a right midfielder for Ukrainian club Viktoriya Sumy.
