= Artem Radionov =

Ukrainian footballer (born 1983)

Personal information
- Date of birth: 3 September 1983 (age 43)
- Place of birth: Sumy, Ukraine
- Height: 1.76 m (5 ft 9 in)
- Positions: Defender; midfielder

Youth career
- –2000: Zmina Sumy

Senior career*
Years	Team	Apps	(Gls)
2001–2003	Spartak Sumy	1	(0)
2002–2003	Yavir Krasnopillia	22	(1)
2003–2005	Vorskla-2 Poltava	38	(1)
2004–2005	Spartak Sumy	8	(0)
2005–2008	Stal Dniprodzerzhynsk	53	(1)
2008–2010	Helios Kharkiv	56	(0)
2011–2013	Sumy		
2014	Ahrobiznes TSC Romny		
2015–2016	Viktoriya Mykolaivka		

Managerial career
- 2015–2021: Viktoriya Mykolaivka
- * Club domestic league appearances and goals

Artem Radionov (born 3 September 1983) is a Ukrainian former professional football defender who became a football manager.

Radionov is a product of the Sumy specialized sports school of Olympic Reserve coached by Kostiantyn Zinoviev.

In 2000–01 season Radionov also played for futsal club Sumyhaz Sumy.

In 2001 he joined the newly revived Yavir Krasnopillia which played in amateur championship. After playing four games in the summer of 2001, he joined Spartak Sumy and played with the team until 2013. He became a manager in 2015.
