= FC Prykarpattia Ivano-Frankivsk =

FC Prykarpattia Ivano-Frankivsk may refer to:

- FC Prykarpattia Ivano-Frankivsk (1940), also known as FC Spartak
- FC Prykarpattia Ivano-Frankivsk (1998), also known as FC Teplovyk
- FC Prykarpattia Ivano-Frankivsk (2004), also known as FC Fakel
