= Andriy Havryushov =

Ukrainian footballer

Personal information
- Full name: Andriy Valeriyovych Havryushov
- Date of birth: 24 September 1977 (age 49)
- Place of birth: Dnipropetrovsk, Ukrainian SSR
- Height: 1.78 m (5 ft 10 in)
- Position: Defender

Team information
- Current team: Livyi Bereh Kyiv (manager)

Youth career
- 1990s: Dnipro-75 Dnipropetrovsk

Senior career*
Years	Team	Apps	(Gls)
1994–1998	Metalurh Novomoskovsk	74	(1)
1998-2003	Oleksandriya	110	(2)
2003–2004	Nyva Vinnytsia	30	(3)
2004–2007	Stal Alchevsk	89	(0)
2007	Metalurh Donetsk	15	(0)
2008–2009	Zorya Luhansk	27	(0)
2010	Oleksandriya	20	(0)

Managerial career
- 2011–2012: Oleksandriya (youth)
- 2013–2016: Dnipro Dnipropetrovsk (youth)
- 2019–2021: Oleksandriya (U21 assistant)
- 2021–2022: Oleksandriya (U19 assistant)
- 2023–2024: Rukh Lviv (youth)
- 2024: Rukh Lviv (U17)
- 2024–2025: Livyi Bereh Kyiv (U19)
- 2025–: Livyi Bereh Kyiv
- * Club domestic league appearances and goals

Andriy Valeriyovych Havryushov (born 24 September 1977) is a Ukrainian football coach and former professional football defender.
