= Dmytro Ulyanov =

Ukrainian footballer

Personal information
- Full name: Dmytro Serhiyovych Ulyanov
- Date of birth: 1 December 1993 (age 32)
- Place of birth: Zaporizhzhia, Ukraine
- Height: 1.72 m (5 ft 8 in)
- Position: Left-back

Team information
- Current team: Viktoriya Sumy
- Number: 33

Youth career
- 2006–2009: Metalurh Zaporizhzhia

Senior career*
Years	Team	Apps	(Gls)
2009–2012	Metalurh-2 Zaporizhzhia	55	(0)
2009–2016	Metalurh Zaporizhzhia	6	(0)
2016	Hirnyk-Sport Komsomolsk	10	(0)
2016–2018	Avanhard Kramatorsk	61	(4)
2018	Samtredia	2	(0)
2019	Avanhard Kramatorsk	13	(0)
2020–2021	Mykolaiv	37	(0)
2021–2022	Viktoriya Mykolaivka	17	(1)
2022	Alians Lypova Dolyna	0	(0)
2022–2023	Vranov nad Topľou	10	(1)
2023–	Viktoriya Sumy	75	(3)
- * Club domestic league appearances and goals as of 4 June 2026

Dmytro Serhiyovych Ulyanov (Ukrainian: Дмитро Сергійович Ульянов; born 1 December 1993) is a Ukrainian professional footballer who plays as a left-back for Viktoriya Sumy.

== Club career ==
Yusov is a product of the youth team system Metalurh Zaporizhzhia. He made his debut for Metalurh entering as a second time playing against Dynamo Kyiv on 26 May 2013 in Ukrainian Premier League.
