= Vladimir Arsić =

Bosnian footballer

Personal information
- Date of birth: 20 April 2001 (age 25)
- Place of birth: Banja Luka, Bosnia and Herzegovina
- Height: 1.92 m (6 ft 4 in)
- Position: Centre-back

Team information
- Current team: Gagra
- Number: 4

Senior career*
Years	Team	Apps	(Gls)
2021–2022	Leotar	26	(0)
2022–2024	Vejle	8	(0)
2024–2025	Chornomorets Odesa	5	(0)
2026–	Gagra	16	(1)
- * Club domestic league appearances and goals as of 10 July 2026

Vladimir Arsić (born 20 April 2001) is a Bosnian professional footballer who plays as a centre-back for Georgian top-league club Gagra.

== Career ==
On 18 July 2022, Arsić joined Danish Superliga side Vejle.

On 30 January 2024, Arsić joined Ukrainian Premier League side Chornomorets Odesa. On 3 August 2024 in the 1st round match of the Ukrainian Premier League between Kryvbas Kryvyi Rih and Chornomorets he made his official debut as player of Chornomorets.

== Honours ==
- Danish 1st Division: 2022–23
