= Denys Teslyuk =

Ukrainian footballer

Personal information
- Full name: Denys Valeriyovych Teslyuk
- Date of birth: 11 April 2003 (age 23)
- Place of birth: Lutsk, Ukraine
- Height: 1.90 m (6 ft 3 in)
- Position: Centre-forward

Team information
- Current team: Obolon Kyiv
- Number: 99

Youth career
- 2014–2020: Volyn Lutsk

Senior career*
Years	Team	Apps	(Gls)
2020–2022	Volyn Lutsk	12	(0)
2020–2021	→ Volyn-2 Lutsk	24	(1)
2022–2024	Rukh Lviv	20	(1)
2023–2024	→ Rukh-2 Lviv	6	(3)
2024–	Obolon Kyiv	33	(1)

International career^{‡}
2019	Ukraine U17	4	(1)
2023	Ukraine U21	1	(0)
- * Club domestic league appearances and goals as of 3 June 2026 ‡ National team caps and goals as of 19 June 2025

Denys Valeriyovych Teslyuk (Ukrainian: Денис Валерійович Теслюк; born 11 April 2003) is a Ukrainian professional footballer who plays as a centre-forward for Ukrainian club Obolon Kyiv.

== Club career ==
On 5 July 2024, Teslyuk signed a two-year contract with Obolon Kyiv.
