= Volodymyr Romanenko =

Ukrainian footballer

Personal information
- Full name: Volodymyr Romanenko
- Date of birth: 8 June 1985 (age 41)
- Place of birth: Sumy, Ukrainian SSR
- Height: 1.80 m (5 ft 11 in)
- Position: Midfielder

Youth career
- 1998–2000: Frunzenets Sumy
- 2000–2002: Dynamo Kyiv

Senior career*
Years	Team	Apps	(Gls)
2000–2002	Dynamo Kyiv	0	(0)
2001–2002	→ Borysfen-2 Boryspil (loan)	20	(3)
2002	→ Dynamo-3 Kyiv	2	(0)
2002–2005	Dnipro Dnipropetrovsk	0	(0)
2002–2004	→ Dnipro-2 Dnipropetrovsk	52	(2)
2005–2007	Stal Dniprodzerzhynsk	56	(3)
2007–2009	Metalurh Donetsk	11	(0)
2009	Banants	12	(0)
2009–2010	Stal Dniprodzerzhynsk	10	(0)
2010–2013	Krymteplytsia Molodizhne	76	(1)
2013	Sumy	6	(0)
2013–2015	Helios Kharkiv	33	(2)
2015–2016	Okean Kerch	25	(2)
2016–2021	Viktoriya Mykolaivka	37	(6)

International career
2001–2002	Ukraine U17	1	(0)

Managerial career
- 2021–: Viktoriya Mykolaivka/Sumy (assistant)
- 2022–2023: Viktoriya Sumy (caretaker)
- 2026–: Viktoriya Sumy (caretaker)
- * Club domestic league appearances and goals

Volodymyr Romanenko (born 8 June 1985) is a professional Ukrainian football midfielder and coach.

Following the Russian annexation of Crimea in 2015–2016, Romanenko participated in the Crimean championship.
