= Yevheniy Mykytyuk =

Ukrainian footballer

Personal information
- Full name: Yevheniy Volodymyrovych Mykytyuk
- Date of birth: 21 September 2005 (age 21)
- Place of birth: Cherniakhiv, Ukraine
- Height: 1.79 m (5 ft 10 in)
- Position: Attacking midfielder

Team information
- Current team: Polissya Zhytomyr

Youth career
- 2016–2017: DYuSSh-Zherm Chernyakhiv
- 2018–2022: Dynamo Kyiv

Senior career*
Years	Team	Apps	(Gls)
2022–	Polissya Zhytomyr	11	(1)
2024–	Polissya-2 Zhytomyr	10	(1)

International career^{‡}
2021–2022	Ukraine U17	3	(1)
2023	Ukraine U19	6	(0)
- * Club domestic league appearances and goals as of 14 June 2025 ‡ National team caps and goals as of 8 October 2024

Yevheniy Volodymyrovych Mykytyuk (Ukrainian: Євгеній Володимирович Микитюк; born 21 September 2005) is a Ukrainian professional footballer who plays as an attacking midfielder for Ukrainian First League club Polissya Zhytomyr.
