= Artem Shpyryonok =

Ukrainian footballer

Personal information
- Full name: Artem Volodymyrovych Shpyryonok
- Date of birth: 30 July 2002 (age 24)
- Place of birth: Sumy, Ukraine
- Position: Centre-forward

Team information
- Current team: Viktoriya Sumy
- Number: 22

Youth career
- 2011–2019: Barsa Sumy

Senior career*
Years	Team	Apps	(Gls)
2019–2023	Alians Lypova Dolyna	29	(0)
2020	→ Alians-2 Lypova Dolyna	9	(3)
2023–	Viktoriya Sumy	43	(3)
- * Club domestic league appearances and goals as of 4 June 2026

Artem Volodymyrovych Shpyryonok (Ukrainian: Артем Володимирович Шпирьонок; born 30 July 2002) is a Ukrainian professional footballer who plays as a centre-forward for Ukrainian club Viktoriya Sumy.
