= Vitaliy Dakhnovskyi =

Ukrainian footballer

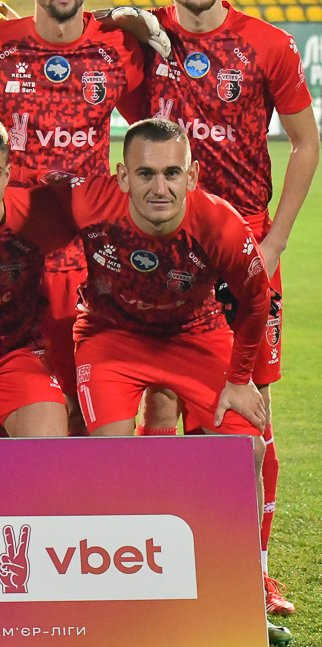

Personal information
- Full name: Vitaliy Olehovych Dakhnovskyi
- Date of birth: 10 February 1999 (age 27)
- Place of birth: Piatnytsia, Lviv Oblast, Ukraine
- Height: 1.75 m (5 ft 9 in)
- Position: Left midfielder

Team information
- Current team: Bukovyna Chernivtsi
- Number: 8

Youth career
- 2011–2016: Lviv
- 2017–2018: Veres Rivne
- 2018–2019: Lviv

Senior career*
Years	Team	Apps	(Gls)
2016–2017	Lviv	22	(2)
2019	Cosmos Nowotaniec	13	(16)
2019–2020	Wisła Sandomierz	18	(3)
2020–2025	Veres Rivne	119	(14)
2025–	Bukovyna Chernivtsi	28	(18)
- * Club domestic league appearances and goals as of 3 June 2026

Vitaliy Olehovych Dakhnovskyi (Ukrainian: Віталій Олегович Дахновський; born 10 February 1999) is a Ukrainian professional footballer who plays as a midfielder for Bukovyna Chernivtsi.

== Club career ==
In early 2020, Dakhnovskyi joined Polish semi-professional club Cosmos Nowotaniec, before spending the 2019–20 season with fourth-tier side Wisła Sandomierz.

On 23 August 2020, he signed for Ukrainian First League club Veres Rivne.

In June 2021, Dakhnovskyi was selected as a player of the month in the Ukrainian First League.

== Honours ==
Cosmos Nowotaniec

- Klasa A Krosno I: 2018–19
