= Chijioke Aniagboso =

Nigerian football player

Personal information
- Full name: Chijioke Kingsley Aniagboso
- Date of birth: 15 April 2004 (age 22)
- Position: Goalkeeper

Team information
- Current team: Chornomorets Odesa
- Number: 12

Senior career*
Years	Team	Apps	(Gls)
–2023	Giant Brillars		
2023–2024	Polissya Zhytomyr	0	(0)
2024	→ Zviahel (loan)	0	(0)
2024–	Chornomorets Odesa	31	(0)

International career^{‡}
2023	Nigeria U20	11	(0)
- * Club domestic league appearances and goals as of 2 August 2026 ‡ National team caps and goals as of 18 September 2026

Chijioke Kingsley Aniagboso (born 15 April 2004) is a Nigerian footballer who plays as a goalkeeper for Ukrainian club Chornomorets Odesa.

== Club career ==
Aniangboso played for Giant Brillars FC in his homeland. In May 2023, he joined FC Polissya Zhytomyr of the Ukrainian Premier League on a five-year deal.

On 6 September 2024 Aniagboso joined Ukrainian Premier League side Chornomorets Odesa, making his debut against LNZ Cherkasy on 28 September 2024. Making his debut in the Ukrainian Premier League at the age of 20 years 166 days, Aniagboso became the youngest foreign goalkeeper in the Ukrainian national championship.

== International career ==
Aniagboso played five matches as Nigeria finished third at the 2023 AFCON U-20 championships. He captained Nigeria during the tournament when skipper Daniel Bameyi was suspended. Following the tournament, he and Bameyi were called up to the senior Nigeria squad for their 2023 Africa Cup of Nations (AFCON) qualifying matches against Guinea-Bissau on March 24 and March 27, 2023 but remained an unused substitute. In May 2023, he was named in the Nigeria squad for the 2023 FIFA U-20 World Cup.

== Honours ==
Chornomorets Odesa

- Ukrainian First League runner-up: 2025–26
