= FC Viktoriya Sumy =

Viktoriya Sumy
- Full name: Футбольний клуб «Вікторія» Суми; Football Club Viktoriya Sumy
- Founded: 2015; 11 years ago, as F.C. Viktoriya Mykolaivka; 2023; 3 years ago, as F.C. Viktoriya Sumy
- Ground: Yuvileiny Stadium, Sumy; Kuts Stadium, Trostyanets (currently)
- Capacity: 25,830; 1,124 (currently)
- Owner: LNZ Group
- Chairman: Serhiy Bondarenko
- Head coach: Anatoliy Bezsmertnyi
- League: Ukrainian First League
- 2024–25: 9th
- Website: https://fcviktoria.com.ua/
Home colours	Away colours	Third colours

Football Club Viktoriya Sumy (Ukrainian: Футбольний клуб «Вікторія» Суми) is a Ukrainian professional football club based in Sumy. The club competes in the Ukrainian First League, the second division of Ukrainian football. Founded in 2015 as Football Club Viktoriya Mykolaivka, the club merged with FC Alians Lypova Dolyna in 2022 and subsequently relocated from Arena Viktoriya in Mykolaivka to Yuvileiny Stadium in Sumy.

== History ==
Viktoriya Stadium in Mykolaivka

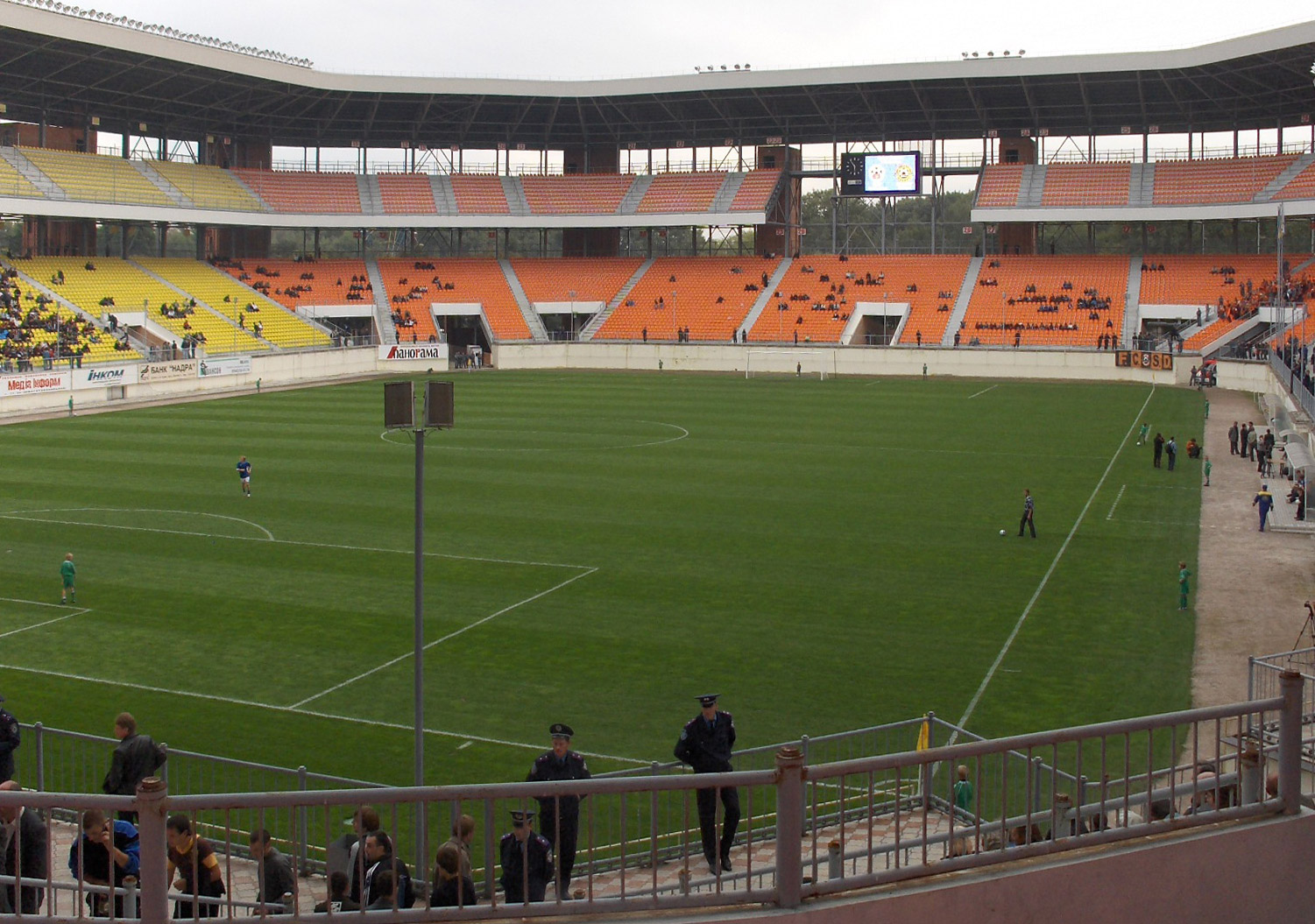
Yuvileiny Stadium in Sumy

The club was created in 2015 in town of Zhovtneve (today Mykolaivka). From its establishment to 2021 the club was coached by Artem Radionov, a footballer out of Sumy, who spent most of his career playing for teams from the city of Sumy as well as the region.

The club returned to professional competitions in 2023 due to the 2022 Russian aggression against Ukraine. During their time away, Viktoriya merged with another club FC Alyans Lypova Dolyna taking over their place in the Ukrainian First League (2nd tier). The merger took place in January 2022 and was postponed during the active phase of the Russian full-scale invasion and partial occupation of Sumy Oblast. In 2023 the club officially moved its administration of Sumy playing at the main stadium.

== Honours ==
- Ukrainian Football Amateur League
  - Winners (2): 2017–18, 2019–20
  - Runners-up (1): 2018–19
- Ukrainian Amateur Cup
  - Runners-up (2): 2017–18, 2019–20
- Sumy Oblast Championship
  - Runners-up (2): 2015, 2016
- Sumy Oblast Winter Championship
  - Winner (1): 2016
- Sumy Oblast Cup
  - Runners-up (2): 2015

== Current squad ==
As of 8 September 2026

Note: Flags indicate national team as defined under FIFA eligibility rules; some limited exceptions apply. Players may hold more than one non-FIFA nationality.

No.	Pos.	Nation	Player
1	GK	UKR	Nazar Yurchenko
4	DF	UKR	Daniil Melnyk
5	MF	UKR	Oleksandr Vasylyev
6	MF	UKR	Vladyslav Khamelyuk
7	FW	UKR	Dmytro Hryshchenko
8	MF	UKR	Yaroslav Dobrokhotov
9	DF	UKR	Oleksandr Chernov
10	FW	UKR	Danylo Knysh
11	MF	UKR	Oleksandr Lebedenko
15	FW	UKR	Danylo Kirichenko
16	DF	UKR	Artur Novotryasov
17	DF	UKR	Andriy Dedyaev

No.	Pos.	Nation	Player
18	MF	UKR	Ruslan Dedukh
19	MF	UKR	Vladyslav Savytskyi
22	FW	UKR	Artem Shpyryonok
25	MF	UKR	Stanislav Sharay
27	MF	UKR	Denys Dolinskyi
28	DF	UKR	Denys Ryabyi
29	MF	UKR	Artem Ryabyi
31	GK	UKR	Vladyslav Kucheruk
32	GK	UKR	Oleksandr Lytvynenko
33	DF	UKR	Dmytro Ulyanov
45	DF	UKR	Ivan Ilchuk
77	FW	UKR	Artem Lyehostayev

== Head coaches ==
- 2015 – 2021 Artem Radionov
- 2021 – 2022 Anatoliy Bezsmertnyi
- 2022 – 2023 Volodymyr Romanenko (caretaker)
- 2023 – 2026 Anatoliy Bezsmertnyi
- 2026 – present Volodymyr Romanenko (caretaker)

== League and cup history ==
Season	Div.	Pos.	Pl.	W	D	L	GS	GA	P	Domestic Cup	Other		Notes
Viktoriya Mykolaivka
2016–17	4th Group 2 (Amateur Championship)	4_{/12}	20	8	6	6	21	23	30		AM	1/4 finals	
2017–18	4th Group 2 (Amateur Championship)	1_{/8}	14	11	3	0	31	10	36		PL	Winner	
2017–18	4th Group 2 (Amateur Championship)	1_{/8}	14	11	3	0	31	10	36		AM	Finalist	
2018–19	4th Group 2 (Amateur Championship)	2_{/12}	22	17	4	1	58	11	55	1/32 finals	PL	Finalist	
2018–19	4th Group 2 (Amateur Championship)	2_{/12}	22	17	4	1	58	11	55	1/32 finals	AM	1/16 finals	
2019–20	4th Group 2 (Amateur Championship)	1_{/12}	22	18	3	1	59	12	57		PL	Winner	
2019–20	4th Group 2 (Amateur Championship)	1_{/12}	22	18	3	1	59	12	57		AM	Finalist	
2020–21	4th Group 2 (Amateur Championship)	1_{/11}	20	18	1	1	61	21	55	1/16 finals	PL	Finalist	Promoted
2020–21	4th Group 2 (Amateur Championship)	1_{/11}	20	18	1	1	61	21	55	1/16 finals	AM	1/2 finals	Promoted
2021–22	3rd"B" (Second League)	10_{/16}	19	8	3	8	22	23	27	1/64 finals			Withdrew after season
2022–23	club idle, merger → Viktoriya Sumy												
2023–24	2nd(Persha Liha "B")	4/10	18	8	6	4	19	18	30	1/4 finals			Qualified to the Promotion group
2023–24	2nd(Persha Liha "PRO")	7/10	28	10	9	9	23	27	39	1/4 finals			
2024–25	2nd(Persha Liha "B")	5/9	16	6	5	5	23	12	23	1/4 finals			Qualified to the Relegation group
2024–25	2nd(Persha Liha "REL")	9/17	24	9	9	6	32	17	36	1/4 finals			
2025–26	2nd(Persha Liha)	10/16	30	10	6	14	37	38	36	1/8 finals	-	-	-
2026–27	2nd(Persha Liha)	1/16	10	6	2	2	12	6	20	1/16 finals	-	-	TBD

== See also ==
- FC LNZ-Lebedyn
- FC Alians Lypova Dolyna
