= 2026–27 FC Karpaty Lviv season =

Karpaty Lviv
2026–27 season
- President: Stepan Yurchyshyn
- Manager: Fran Fernández
- Stadium: Ukraina Stadium, Lviv
- Premier League: 4th
- Ukrainian Cup: Quarter-finals
- Top goalscorer: League: Yan Kostenko (7); All: Yan Kostenko (7)
- Highest home attendance: 11,200 vs Shakhtar; 5 September 2026
- Lowest home attendance: 2,500 vs Kudrivka; 2 November 2026

The 2026–27 season is the 30th season in the top Ukrainian football league for FC Karpaty Lviv overall and their third since reorganization in 2021. Karpaty will participate in Premier League and Ukrainian Cup.

== Season events ==
On 22 June Karpaty gathered at club's base in Bartativ for the first pre-season training camp. On 5 July team departed for two-week training camp in Slovenia. Overall eight pre-season matches are planned.

== Players ==
=== Squad information ===
As of 22 August 2026

Squad no.	Name	Nationality	Position	Date of birth (age)
Goalkeepers
1	Denys Marchenko	(Ukraine)	GK	5 February 2007 (age 19)
36	Anton Zhylkin	(Ukraine)	GK	14 April 2003 (age 23)
80	Roman Mysak	(Ukraine)	GK	9 September 1991 (age 35)
99	Yuriy-Volodymyr Hereta	(Ukraine)	GK	30 January 2004 (age 22)
Defenders
2	Mykola Kyrychok	(Ukraine)	DF	16 May 2006 (age 20)
4	Vladislav Baboglo	(Moldova)	DF	14 November 1998 (age 28)
5	Andriy Buleza	(Ukraine)	DF	25 January 2004 (age 22)
11	Denys Miroshnichenko	(Ukraine)	DF	11 October 1994 (age 32)
14	Iván Calero	(Spain)	DF	21 April 1995 (age 31)
17	Roman Vantukh	(Ukraine)	DF	4 July 1998 (age 28)
22	Yurii Kokodyniak	(Ukraine)	DF	14 July 2007 (age 19)
39	Vitaliy Katrych	(Ukraine)	DF	17 February 2005 (age 21)
44	Vitaliy Kholod	(Ukraine)	DF	15 January 2004 (age 22)
47	Jean Pedroso	(Brazil)	DF	28 January 2004 (age 22)
55	Tymur Stetskov	(Ukraine)	DF	27 January 1998 (age 28)
73	Rostyslav Lyakh	(Ukraine)	DF	12 October 2000 (age 26)
Midfielders
7	Fellipe Vieira	(Brazil)	MF	31 May 2005 (age 21)
8	Ambrosiy Chachua	(Ukraine)	MF	2 April 1994 (age 32)
10	Moha Moukhliss	(Spain)	MF	6 February 2000 (age 26)
16	Ivan Chaban	(Ukraine)	MF	24 July 2006 (age 20)
18	Eriki	(Brazil)	MF	6 August 2005 (age 21)
19	Yaroslav Karabin	(Ukraine)	MF	19 November 2002 (age 24)
20	Marko Sapuha	(Ukraine)	MF	29 May 2003 (age 23)
21	Bruno Iglesias	(Spain)	MF	1 May 2003 (age 23)
26	Yan Kostenko	(Ukraine)	MF	4 July 2003 (age 23)
70	Xeber Alkain	(Spain)	MF	26 June 1997 (age 29)
77	Joaquinete	(Spain)	MF	30 July 1997 (age 29)
Forwards
9	Joseph Sery	(France)	FW	5 August 2000 (age 26)
28	Oleksandr Diedov	(Ukraine)	FW	19 June 2008 (age 18)
31	Nazariy Rusyn	(Ukraine)	FW	25 October 1998 (age 28)
Away on loan
9	Fabiano	(Brazil)	MF	15 April 2006 (age 20)
14	Illya Kvasnytsya	(Ukraine)	MF	20 March 2003 (age 23)
33	Artur Shakh	(Ukraine)	MF	11 May 2005 (age 21)
35	Edson Fernando	(Brazil)	MF	24 April 1998 (age 28)
Players who left during the season

== Transfers ==
=== In ===
Date	Pos.	Player	Age	Moving from	Type	Fee	Source
Summer
20 June 2026	GK	(Ukraine) Denys Marchenko	19	(Ukraine) Obolon Kyiv	Transfer	€1,000,000	
24 June 2026	DF	(Ukraine) Roman Vantukh	27	(Ukraine) Zorya Luhansk	Transfer	Free	
30 June 2026	FW	(Brazil) Igor Neves	27	(Ukraine) Rukh Lviv	End of loan		
30 June 2026	DF	(Ukraine) Mykola Kyrychok	20	(Ukraine) Rukh Lviv	End of loan		
1 July 2026	GK	(Ukraine) Anton Zhylkin	23	(Ukraine) Inhulets Petrove	Transfer	€30,000	
1 July 2026	FW	(Ukraine) Nazariy Rusyn	27	(England) Sunderland	Transfer	Free	
3 July 2026	MF	(Spain) Moha Moukhliss	26	(Portugal) Vizela	Transfer	€600,000	
22 July 2026	MF	(Brazil) Fellipe Vieira	21	(Latvia) Liepāja	Transfer	€450,000	
30 July 2026	DF	(Spain) Iván Calero	31	(Spain) Cultural Leonesa	Transfer	€450,000	
31 July 2026	MF	(Spain) Bruno Iglesias	23	(Spain) RM Castilla	Transfer	Free	
3 August 2026	GK	(Ukraine) Yuriy-Volodymyr Hereta	22	(Ukraine) Rukh Lviv	Transfer	Free	
12 August 2026	FW	(France) Joseph Sery	26	(Portugal) Penafiel	Transfer	€200,000	
19 August 2026	MF	(Spain) Joaquinete	29	(Ukraine) Epitsentr Kamianets-Podilskyi	Transfer	€260,000	
Winter
1 February 2027	MF	(Brazil) Fabiano	20	(Brazil) Palmeiras	End of loan		

=== Out ===
Date	Pos.	Player	Age	Moving to	Type	Fee	Source
Summer
28 May 2026	GK	(Ukraine) Nazar Domchak	19	(Czech Republic) Slavia Prague	Transfer	€5,000,000	
29 May 2026	FW	(The Gambia) Baboucarr Faal	23	(Czech Republic) Viktoria Plzeň	Transfer	€3,000,000	
6 June 2026	GK	(Ukraine) Oleksandr Kemkin	23	(Ukraine) Kryvbas Kryvyi Rih	Transfer	€175,000	
30 June 2026	GK	(Ukraine) Andriy Klishchuk	33	(Ukraine) FC Oleksandriya	Transfer	Free	
30 June 2026	DF	(Ukraine) Volodymyr Adamyuk	34	(Ukraine) FC Oleksandriya	Transfer	Free	
30 June 2026	MF	(Ukraine) Valentyn Rubchynskyi	24	(Ukraine) Dynamo Kyiv	End of loan		
30 June 2026	MF	(Brazil) Paulo Vitor	27	(Portugal) Portimonense	End of loan		
30 June 2026	FW	(Brazil) Igor Neves	27	Released			
1 July 2026	MF	(Brazil) Edson Fernando	28	(Brazil) Remo	Loan	?	
2 July 2026	MF	(Brazil) Bruninho	26	(Israel) Maccabi Haifa	Transfer	€1,700,000	
14 July 2026	MF	(Brazil) Stênio	23	(Italy) Modena	Transfer	€500,000	
21 July 2026	DF	(Ukraine) Oleksiy Sych	25	(Ukraine) Dynamo Kyiv	Transfer	€1,000,000	
26 July 2026	MF	(Ukraine) Illya Kvasnytsya	23	(Ukraine) Livyi Bereh Kyiv	Loan		
13 August 2026	MF	(Ukraine) Artur Shakh	21	(Poland) Lechia Gdańsk	Loan		
Winter

== Pre-season and friendlies ==
2 July 2026 Friendly	Karpaty Lviv	1–1	Feniks-Mariupol	Bartativ
10:00 EEST (UTC+03:00)	Stetskov 69'	Report	Buhay 53'	Stadium: FC Karpaty Training Center

3 July 2026 Friendly	Karpaty Lviv	2–1	Nyva Ternopil	Bartativ
10:00 EEST (UTC+03:00)	Karabin 49'; Reznik 55'	Report	Botskiv 80'	Stadium: FC Karpaty Training Center

9 July 2025 Friendly	CFR Cluj (Romania)	1–0	Karpaty Lviv	Radomlje, Slovenia
17:30 CEST (UTC+02:00)	Đoković 71' (pen.)	Report		Stadium: Športni park Radomlje

11 July 2025 Friendly	Bravo (Slovenia)	0–1	Karpaty Lviv	Grosuplje, Slovenia
18:30 CEST (UTC+02:00)		Report	Karabin 68'	Stadium: Športni park Brinje

17 July 2025 Friendly	Lokomotiva Zagreb (Croatia)	0–0	Karpaty Lviv	Grosuplje, Slovenia
17:30 CEST (UTC+02:00)		Report		Stadium: Športni park Brinje

18 July 2025 Friendly	Željezničar Sarajevo (Bosnia and Herzegovina)	0–4	Karpaty Lviv	Šmartno ob Paki, Slovenia
16:00 CEST (UTC+02:00)		Report	Diedov 14', 32'; Shakh 43', 50'	Stadium: Šmartno Stadium

25 July 2026 Friendly	Karpaty Lviv	5–1	Veres Rivne	Bartativ
11:00 EEST (UTC+03:00)	Karabin 13'; Fellipe 21'; Vantukh 37'; Sapuha 42'; Diedov 48'	Report	? 26'	Stadium: FC Karpaty Training Center; Referee: Yaroslav Leskiv

25 July 2026 Friendly	Karpaty Lviv	1–0	Veres Rivne	Bartativ
13:00 EEST (UTC+03:00)	Kostenko 31'	Report		Stadium: FC Karpaty Training Center; Referee: Stepan Lapko

3 October 2025 Friendly	Mechelen (Belgium)	2–3	Karpaty Lviv	Mechelen, Belgium
17:00 CEST (UTC+02:00)	Boersma 54' van Brederode 71' van Meirvenne (red card) 78'	Report	Sery 24'; Alkain 69'; Kostenko 76'; Moukhliss (yellow card) 78'	Stadium: Achter de Kazerne; Attendance: 4,000

12 November 2026 Friendly	Karpaty Lviv	1–1	Veres Rivne	Lviv
14:00 EET (UTC+02:00)	Calero 72'	Report	Sharay 31'	Stadium: Ukraina Stadium

== Competitions ==
=== Overall ===
Competition	Record							
Competition	Pld	W	D	L	GF	GA	GD	Win %
Premier League	11	5	4	2	22	8	+14	45.45
Cup	3	3	0	0	7	3	+4	100.00
Total	14	8	4	2	29	11	+18	57.14

Last updated: 2 November 2026
Source: Competitions

=== Premier League ===
==== League table ====
Pos	Team	Pld	W	D	L	GF	GA	GD	Pts	Qualification or relegation
2	Polissya Zhytomyr	11	9	1	1	25	8	+17	28	Qualification for the Conference League second qualifying round
3	Dynamo Kyiv	11	7	2	2	16	9	+7	23	Qualification for the Conference League second qualifying round
4	Karpaty Lviv	12	6	4	2	23	8	+15	22	Qualified for the Quarter-finals UC
5	Kharkiv	10	7	0	3	19	9	+10	21	Qualified for the Quarter-finals UC
6	LNZ Cherkasy	11	5	3	3	12	10	+2	18 (Note: Ranked on head-to-head points: LNZ Cherkasy 3, Zorya Luhansk 0)	

Updated to match(es) played on 21 November 2026. Source: upl.ua
Rules for classification: 1) Points; 2) Head-to-head points; 3) Head-to-head goal difference; 4) Head-to-head goals scored; 5) Goal difference; 6) Goals scored; 7) Draw or "Golden match" if two teams are tied for title (Article 22, paragraph 3).
Notes:

Premier League teams	Agg.	First League teams	1st leg	2nd leg
	x–x			
	x–x			

=== First Semi-final ===
v

v

=== Second Semi-final ===
v

v

==== Results summary ====
Overall								Home						Away					
Pld	W	D	L	GF	GA	GD	Pts	W	D	L	GF	GA	GD	W	D	L	GF	GA	GD
12	6	4	2	23	8	+15	22	4	2	1	16	5	+11	2	2	1	7	3	+4

Last updated: 21 November 2026.
Source: Competitive matches

==== Results by round ====
Round	1	2	3	4	5	6	7	8	9	10	11	12	13	14	15
Ground	A	H	H	A	H	A	H	A	H	A	H	A	H	H	H
Result	W	W	W	D	L	W	D	L	D	D	W	A	W		
Position	2	1	1	1	3	3	3	5	5	5	5	5	4		

Updated to match(es) played on 21 November 2026. Source: Competitive matches
A = Away; H = Home; W = Win; D = Draw; L = Loss

==== Matches ====
1 August 2025 1	Kryvbas Kryvyi Rih	1–4	Karpaty Lviv	Kryvyi Rih
13:00 EEST (UTC+03:00)	Jurčec 22' (pen.); Satchwell (yellow card) 37'	Report	Rusyn (yellow card) 8'; Eriki (yellow card) 30'; Chachua 45+4' (pen.); Baboglo 57'; Kostenko 65'; Vantukh 72'	Stadium: Hirnyk Stadium; Attendance: 600; Referee: Oleksandr Afanasiev

10 August 2025 2	Karpaty Lviv	3–0	LNZ Cherkasy	Lviv
18:00 EEST (UTC+03:00)	Chachua (yellow card) 3'; Stetskov (yellow card) 51'; Baboglo 67'; Calero 77'; Fellipe 86'	Report	Pastukh (yellow card) 24'; Muravskyi (yellow card) 48'; Pasich (yellow card) 62'; Cara (penalty missed) 89'	Stadium: Ukraina Stadium; Attendance: 5,516; Referee: Oleksandr Omelchenko

15 August 2025 3	Karpaty Lviv	3–0	Bukovyna Chernivtsi	Lviv
18:00 EEST (UTC+03:00)	Fellipe 5'; Rusyn 8'; Kostenko 64'; Calero (yellow card) 90+2'	Report	Vitenchuk (yellow card) 49'; Busko (yellow card) 59'	Stadium: Ukraina Stadium; Attendance: 6,150; Referee: Artem Mykhaylyuk

29 August 2026 4	Livyi Bereh Kyiv	1–1	Karpaty Lviv	Kyiv Oblast
15:30 EEST (UTC+03:00)	Banada (yellow card) 56'; Vorobchak 76'	Report	Vantukh (yellow card) 57'; Fellipe 60'	Stadium: Arena Livyi Bereh; Attendance: 1,097; Referee: Mykhaylo Rayda

5 September 2026 5	Karpaty Lviv	1–2	Shakhtar Donetsk	Lviv
18:00 EEST (UTC+03:00)	Rusyn 12'; Moukhliss (yellow card) 22'	Report	Meirelles 25'; Bondar (yellow card) 34'; Newerton (yellow card) 55'; Alisson 67'; Lucas (yellow card) 81'	Stadium: Ukraina Stadium; Attendance: 11,200; Referee: Oleksandr Afanasiev

11 September 2026 6	Kolos Kovalivka	0–2	Karpaty Lviv	Kovalivka
13:00 EEST (UTC+03:00)	Salabay (yellow card) 39'; Tahiri (yellow card) 43'; Ndukve (yellow card) 74'	Report	Rusyn 9', (yellow card) 51'; Sery 20'; Baboglo (yellow card) 32'; Chachua (yellow card) 39'	Stadium: Kolos Stadium; Attendance: 1,080; Referee: Oleksiy Derevinskyi

20 September 2026 7	Karpaty Lviv	1–1	Veres Rivne	Lviv
15:30 EEST (UTC+03:00)	Fellipe 24', (yellow card) 38'; Baboglo (yellow card) 59'; Vantukh (yellow card) 62'; Kostenko (red card) 64'	Report	Vovchenko (yellow card) 29'; Cipot (yellow card) 46'; Gonçalves 82'; Baran (yellow card) 85'	Stadium: Ukraina Stadium; Attendance: 9,100; Referee: Mykola Balakin

11 October 2026 8	Dynamo Kyiv	1–0	Karpaty Lviv	Kyiv
13:00 EEST (UTC+03:00)	Rubchynskyi (yellow card) 30'; Ponomarenko 66', (yellow card) 85'; Bah (yellow card) 77'	Report	Rusyn (yellow card) 22' (yellow-red card) 62'; Sery (yellow card) 48'; Sapuha (yellow card) 54'; Diedov (yellow card) 87'	Stadium: Lobanovskyi Dynamo Stadium; Attendance: 3,336; Referee: Denys Shurman

18 October 2026 9	Karpaty Lviv	2–2	Epitsentr Kamianets-Podilskyi	Lviv
18:00 EEST (UTC+03:00)	Lyakh 35', (yellow card) 37'; Alkain 90+4'	Report	Kozak 15'; Rojas 39'; Repaj (yellow card) 84'; Vashchenko (yellow card) 84'	Stadium: Ukraina Stadium; Attendance: 5,700; Referee: Volodymyr Novokhatniy

25 October 2026 10	Chornomorets Odesa	0–0	Karpaty Lviv	Odesa
13:00 EET (UTC+02:00)	Pushkaryov (yellow card) 5'; Jarju (yellow card) 8'	Report	Pedroso (red card) 5'; Stetskov (yellow card) 33'; Moukhliss (yellow card) 48'; Baboglo (yellow card) 71'; Mysak (yellow card) 90+2'; Vantukh (yellow card) 90+3'	Stadium: Chornomorets Stadium; Attendance: 1,496; Referee: Dmytro Panchyshyn

2 November 2026 11	Karpaty Lviv	5–0	FC Kudrivka	Lviv
18:00 EET (UTC+02:00)	Calero (yellow card) 48'; Kostenko 50', 54', 73'; Chachua 80'; Antoniuk 86'	Report	Melnychuk (yellow card) 42'; Veklyak (yellow card) 57'; Dumanyuk (yellow card) 89'	Stadium: Ukraina Stadium; Attendance: 2,500; Referee: Artem Mykhaylyuk

7 November 2026 12	FC Kharkiv	1–2^{[a]}	Karpaty Lviv	Kyiv Oblast
13:00 EET (UTC+02:00)	Yatsyk 40'; Krupskyi (yellow card) 42'	Report	Alkain 4', (yellow card) 38'; Kostenko 26'; Kholod (yellow card) 34'	Stadium: Arena Livyi Bereh; Attendance: 275; Referee: Oleksiy Derevinskyi

21 November 2026 13	Karpaty Lviv	1–0	Zorya Luhansk	Lviv
18:00 EET (UTC+02:00)	Kostenko 32'; Vantukh (yellow card) 60'	Report	Karavashchenko (yellow card) 61'; Perduta (yellow card) 90+3'	Stadium: Ukraina Stadium; Attendance: 4,500; Referee: Oleksandr Afanasiev

29 November 2026 14	Karpaty Lviv	–	Polissya Zhytomyr	Lviv
18:00 EET (UTC+02:00)				Stadium: Ukraina Stadium

5 December 2026 15	Karpaty Lviv	–	Obolon Kyiv	Lviv
13:00 EET (UTC+02:00)				Stadium: Ukraina Stadium

- ^{a} Match abandoned on 46th minute due to ongoing drone attack in Kyiv Oblast. Will be finished on December 9.

=== Ukrainian Cup ===
22 August 2026 Round of 64	Karpaty Lviv	2–0	Obolon Kyiv	Lviv
18:00 EEST (UTC+03:00)	Sery 37'; Moukhliss (yellow card) 75'; Iglesias 85'; Chachua (yellow card) 90+3'	Report	Moroz (yellow card) 3'; Sukhanov (yellow card) 53'; Kulakovskyi (yellow card) 53'; Chekh (yellow card) 60'; Rebrysh (yellow card) 78'	Stadium: Ukraina Stadium; Attendance: 6,200; Referee: Dmytro Yevtukhov

16 September 2026 Round of 32	Kolos Kovalivka	2–3	Karpaty Lviv	Kovalivka
12:00 EEST (UTC+03:00)	Salabay 9', (yellow card) 90+2'; Demchenko (yellow card) 24'; Rrapaj (yellow card) 34'; Ndukve 45+2'; Honcharenko (yellow card) 80'; Tahiri (yellow card) 86'; Telles (yellow card) 90+4'	Report	Chachua (yellow card) 8', (goal) 47'; Baboglo 32', (yellow card) 87'; Vantukh 68'; Moukhliss (yellow card) 82'; Iglesias (yellow card) 90+2'; Sapuha (yellow card) 90+4'; Rusyn (yellow card) 90+5'	Stadium: Kolos Stadium; Attendance: 536; Referee: Oleh Kohut

29 October 2026 Round of 16	Karpaty Lviv	2–1	FC Oleksandriya	Lviv
18:00 EET (UTC+02:00)	Chachua 27' (pen.); Fellipe 43'; Lyakh (yellow card) 85'	Report	Kopyna (yellow card) 26'; Kozak 45'; Slyusar (yellow card) 64'; Jhonnatan (yellow card) 68'	Stadium: Ukraina Stadium; Attendance: 6,500; Referee: Maksym Kozyryatskyi

2 March 2027 Quarter-finals	Karpaty Lviv	–	TBD	TBD
EET (UTC+02:00)

== Statistics ==
=== Appearances and goals ===
No.	Pos	Nat	Player	Total		Premier League		Cup	
No.	Pos	Nat	Player	Apps	Goals	Apps	Goals	Apps	Goals
Goalkeepers
1	GK	(Ukraine) UKR	Denys Marchenko	6	0	5	0	1	0
80	GK	(Ukraine) UKR	Roman Mysak	10	0	8	0	2	0
Defenders
4	DF	(Moldova) MDA	Vladislav Baboglo	15	3	12	2	3	1
11	DF	(Ukraine) UKR	Denys Miroshnichenko	13	0	3+8	0	1+1	0
14	DF	(Spain) ESP	Iván Calero	15	1	10+2	1	2+1	0
17	DF	(Ukraine) UKR	Roman Vantukh	16	2	11+2	1	1+2	1
44	DF	(Ukraine) UKR	Vitaliy Kholod	3	0	1+2	0	0	0
47	DF	(Brazil) BRA	Jean Pedroso	13	0	6+5	0	2	0
55	DF	(Ukraine) UKR	Tymur Stetskov	9	0	7+1	0	1	0
73	DF	(Ukraine) UKR	Rostyslav Lyakh	15	1	8+4	1	2+1	0
Midfielders
7	MF	(Brazil) BRA	Fellipe Vieira	15	5	8+4	4	3	1
8	MF	(Ukraine) UKR	Ambrosiy Chachua	16	4	13	2	3	2
10	MF	(Spain) ESP	Moha Moukhliss	16	0	11+2	0	3	0
18	MF	(Brazil) BRA	Eriki	5	0	2+3	0	0	0
19	MF	(Ukraine) UKR	Yaroslav Karabin	7	0	1+6	0	0	0
20	MF	(Ukraine) UKR	Marko Sapuha	6	0	2+2	0	0+2	0
21	MF	(Spain) ESP	Bruno Iglesias	8	1	0+5	0	0+3	1
26	MF	(Ukraine) UKR	Yan Kostenko	8	7	6+1	7	1	0
58	MF	(Ukraine) UKR	Volodymyr Antoniuk	1	1	0+1	1	0	0
70	MF	(Spain) ESP	Xeber Alkain	16	2	12+1	2	3	0
77	MF	(Spain) ESP	Joaquinete	5	0	0+3	0	1+1	0
Forwards
9	FW	(France) FRA	Joseph Sery	10	2	6+2	1	2	1
28	FW	(Ukraine) UKR	Oleksandr Diedov	6	0	0+4	0	0+2	0
31	FW	(Ukraine) UKR	Nazariy Rusyn	15	3	11+1	3	2+1	0
Away on loan
33	MF	(Ukraine) UKR	Artur Shakh	1	0	0+1	0	0	0

Source: Competitions

Last updated: 21 November 2026

=== Goalscorers ===
Rank	No.	Pos	Nat	Name	Premier League	Cup	Total
1	26	MF	(Ukraine)	Yan Kostenko	7	0	7
2	7	MF	(Brazil)	Fellipe Vieira	4	1	5
3	8	MF	(Ukraine)	Ambrosiy Chachua	2	2	4
4	31	FW	(Ukraine)	Nazariy Rusyn	3	0	3
	4	DF	(Moldova)	Vladislav Baboglo	2	1	3
6	9	FW	(France)	Joseph Sery	1	1	2
	17	DF	(Ukraine)	Roman Vantukh	1	1	2
	70	MF	(Spain)	Xeber Alkain	2	0	2
9	14	DF	(Spain)	Iván Calero	1	0	1
	21	MF	(Spain)	Bruno Iglesias	0	1	1
	73	DF	(Ukraine)	Rostyslav Lyakh	1	0	1
	58	MF	(Ukraine)	Volodymyr Antoniuk	1	0	1
				Total	25	7	32

Last updated: 21 November 2026

=== Clean sheets ===
Rank	No.	Pos	Nat	Name	Premier League	Cup	Total
1	80	GK	(Ukraine)	Roman Mysak	4	0	4
2	1	GK	(Ukraine)	Denys Marchenko	2	1	3
				Total	6	1	7

Last updated: 21 November 2026

=== Disciplinary record ===
No.	Pos	Nat	Player	Premier League			Cup			Total		
No.	Pos	Nat	Player	Yellow card	(yellow card) (yellow-red card)	Red card	Yellow card	(yellow card) (yellow-red card)	Red card	Yellow card	(yellow card) (yellow-red card)	Red card
4	DF	(Moldova)	Vladislav Baboglo	3	0	0	1	0	0	4	0	0
7	MF	(Brazil)	Fellipe Vieira	1	0	0	0	0	0	1	0	0
8	MF	(Ukraine)	Ambrosiy Chachua	2	0	0	2	0	0	4	0	0
9	FW	(France)	Joseph Sery	1	0	0	0	0	0	1	0	0
10	MF	(Spain)	Moha Moukhliss	2	0	0	2	0	0	4	0	0
14	DF	(Spain)	Iván Calero	2	0	0	0	0	0	2	0	0
17	DF	(Ukraine)	Roman Vantukh	4	0	0	0	0	0	4	0	0
18	MF	(Brazil)	Eriki	1	0	0	0	0	0	1	0	0
20	MF	(Ukraine)	Marko Sapuha	1	0	0	1	0	0	2	0	0
21	MF	(Spain)	Bruno Iglesias	0	0	0	1	0	0	1	0	0
26	MF	(Ukraine)	Yan Kostenko	0	0	1	0	0	0	0	0	1
28	FW	(Ukraine)	Oleksandr Diedov	1	0	0	0	0	0	1	0	0
31	FW	(Ukraine)	Nazariy Rusyn	2	1	0	1	0	0	3	1	0
44	DF	(Ukraine)	Vitaliy Kholod	1	0	0	0	0	0	1	0	0
47	DF	(Brazil)	Jean Pedroso	0	0	1	0	0	0	0	0	1
55	DF	(Ukraine)	Tymur Stetskov	2	0	0	0	0	0	2	0	0
70	MF	(Spain)	Xeber Alkain	1	0	0	0	0	0	1	0	0
73	DF	(Ukraine)	Rostyslav Lyakh	1	0	0	1	0	0	2	0	0
80	GK	(Ukraine)	Roman Mysak	1	0	0	0	0	0	1	0	0
			Total	26	1	2	9	0	0	35	1	2

Last updated: 21 November 2026

== Sources ==
- Official website
