= 2025–26 FC Karpaty Lviv season =

Karpaty Lviv
2025–26 season
- President: Stepan Yurchyshyn
- Manager: Vladyslav Lupashko (until 31 December); Fran Fernández (from 8 January)
- Stadium: Ukraina Stadium, Lviv
- Premier League: 9th
- Ukrainian Cup: Round of 32
- Top goalscorer: League: Bruninho (8); All: Bruninho (9)
- Highest home attendance: 8,700 vs Dynamo; 27 September 2025
- Lowest home attendance: 2,110 vs Oleksandriya; 11 April 2026

The 2025–26 season was 29th season in the top Ukrainian football league for FC Karpaty Lviv overall and their second since reorganization in 2021. Karpaty participated in Premier League and Ukrainian Cup.

== Season events ==
On 24 June Karpaty gathered at club's base in Bartativ for the first pre-season training camp, which continued until 5 July.

On 7 July Karpaty departed for two-week training camp in Austria. Five friendly fixtures were planned, but match against Hertha Berlin on 18 July was cancelled due to excessive number of injuries in German team.

On 31 December Karpaty terminated cooperation with head coach Vladyslav Lupashko by mutual agreement, mainly due to mediocre performance during first half of the season. About a week later he was replaced by former Murcia manager Fran Fernández.

== Players ==
=== Squad information ===
As of 17 May 2026

Squad no.	Name	Nationality	Position	Date of birth (age)
Goalkeepers
1	Nazar Domchak	(Ukraine)	GK	6 April 2007 (age 19)
30	Andriy Klishchuk	(Ukraine)	GK	3 July 1992 (age 33)
80	Roman Mysak	(Ukraine)	GK	9 September 1991 (age 34)
Defenders
3	Volodymyr Adamyuk	(Ukraine)	DF	17 July 1991 (age 34)
4	Vladislav Baboglo	(Moldova)	DF	14 November 1998 (age 27)
5	Andriy Buleza	(Ukraine)	DF	25 January 2004 (age 22)
11	Denys Miroshnichenko	(Ukraine)	DF	11 October 1994 (age 31)
22	Yurii Kokodyniak	(Ukraine)	DF	14 July 2007 (age 18)
39	Vitaliy Katrych	(Ukraine)	DF	17 February 2005 (age 21)
44	Vitaliy Kholod	(Ukraine)	DF	15 January 2004 (age 22)
47	Jean Pedroso	(Brazil)	DF	28 January 2004 (age 22)
55	Tymur Stetskov	(Ukraine)	DF	27 January 1998 (age 28)
73	Rostyslav Lyakh	(Ukraine)	DF	12 October 2000 (age 25)
77	Oleksiy Sych	(Ukraine)	DF	1 April 2001 (age 25)
Midfielders
7	Paulo Vitor	(Brazil)	MF	24 June 1999 (age 26)
8	Ambrosiy Chachua	(Ukraine)	MF	2 April 1994 (age 32)
10	Stênio	(Brazil)	MF	5 April 2003 (age 23)
14	Illya Kvasnytsya	(Ukraine)	MF	20 March 2003 (age 23)
15	Valentyn Rubchynskyi	(Ukraine)	MF	15 February 2002 (age 24)
16	Ivan Chaban	(Ukraine)	MF	24 July 2006 (age 19)
18	Eriki	(Brazil)	MF	6 August 2005 (age 20)
19	Yaroslav Karabin	(Ukraine)	MF	19 November 2002 (age 23)
20	Marko Sapuha	(Ukraine)	MF	29 May 2003 (age 22)
26	Yan Kostenko	(Ukraine)	MF	4 July 2003 (age 22)
33	Artur Shakh	(Ukraine)	MF	11 May 2005 (age 21)
35	Edson Fernando	(Brazil)	MF	24 April 1998 (age 28)
37	Bruninho	(Brazil)	MF	27 April 2000 (age 26)
70	Xeber Alkain	(Spain)	MF	26 June 1997 (age 28)
Forwards
28	Oleksandr Diedov	(Ukraine)	FW	19 June 2008 (age 17)
99	Baboucarr Faal	(The Gambia)	FW	3 April 2003 (age 23)
Away on loan
2	Mykola Kyrychok	(Ukraine)	DF	16 May 2006 (age 20)
9	Fabiano	(Brazil)	MF	15 April 2006 (age 20)
10	Igor Neves	(Brazil)	FW	13 March 1999 (age 27)
35	Oleksandr Kemkin	(Ukraine)	GK	5 August 2002 (age 23)
Players who left during the season
17	Oleh Fedor	(Ukraine)	MF	23 July 2004 (age 21)
18	Vladyslav Klymenko	(Ukraine)	MF	19 June 1994 (age 31)
21	Patricio Tanda	(Argentina)	MF	5 April 2002 (age 24)
23	Pablo Álvarez	(Spain)	MF	23 April 1997 (age 29)
25	Diego Palacios	(Ecuador)	DF	12 July 1999 (age 26)
28	Pavlo Polehenko	(Ukraine)	DF	6 January 1995 (age 31)
95	Ihor Krasnopir	(Ukraine)	FW	1 December 2002 (age 23)

== Transfers ==
=== In ===
Date	Pos.	Player	Age	Moving from	Type	Fee	Source
Summer
14 June 2025	DF	(Brazil) Jean Pedroso	21	(Brazil) Coritiba	Transfer	€900,000	
18 June 2025	MF	(Brazil) Bruninho	25	(Brazil) Atlético Mineiro	Transfer	€800,000	
30 June 2025	FW	(Ukraine) Vadym Sydun	20	(Ukraine) Nyva Ternopil	End of loan		
1 July 2025	GK	(Ukraine) Andriy Klishchuk	32	(Ukraine) Kryvbas Kryvyi Rih	Transfer	Free	
1 July 2025	MF	(Ukraine) Yaroslav Karabin	22	(Ukraine) Rukh Lviv	Transfer	€600,000	
23 July 2025	GK	(Ukraine) Roman Mysak	33	(Ukraine) Kolos Kovalivka	Transfer	Free	
24 July 2025	MF	(Brazil) Paulo Vitor	26	(Portugal) Portimonense	Loan		
14 August 2025	DF	(Ecuador) Diego Palacios	26	(Brazil) Corinthians	Loan		
Winter
31 December 2025	MF	(Brazil) Stênio	22	(Brazil) América Mineiro	End of loan		
8 January 2026	DF	(Ukraine) Vitaliy Kholod	21	(Ukraine) Rukh Lviv	Transfer	€700,000	
9 January 2026	DF	(Ukraine) Rostyslav Lyakh	25	(Ukraine) Rukh Lviv	Transfer	€300,000	
13 January 2026	MF	(Ukraine) Marko Sapuha	22	(Ukraine) Rukh Lviv	Transfer	€200,000	
14 January 2026	MF	(Ukraine) Illya Kvasnytsya	22	(Ukraine) Rukh Lviv	Transfer	€1,000,000	
15 January 2026	MF	(Brazil) Edson Fernando	27	(Ukraine) Rukh Lviv	Transfer	€400,000	
7 February 2026	FW	(The Gambia) Baboucarr Faal	22	(Ukraine) Rukh Lviv	Transfer	€500,000	
18 February 2026	MF	(Brazil) Eriki	20	(Armenia) Van	Transfer	Free	
19 February 2026	MF	(Spain) Xeber Alkain	28	(Spain) Eibar	Transfer	Free	
11 March 2026	MF	(Ukraine) Valentyn Rubchynskyi	24	(Ukraine) Dynamo Kyiv	Loan		

=== Out ===
Date	Pos.	Player	Age	Moving to	Type	Fee	Source
Summer
21 June 2025	DF	(Ukraine) Taras Sakiv	27	(Ukraine) Bukovyna Chernivtsi	Transfer	Free	
30 June 2025	MF	(Ukraine) Oleh Ocheretko	22	(Ukraine) Shakhtar Donetsk	End of loan		
30 June 2025	MF	(Ukraine) Orest Kuzyk	30	Released			
30 June 2025	GK	(Ukraine) Oleksandr Ilyushchenkov	35	Released			
1 July 2025	MF	(Ukraine) Yevhen Pidlepenets	26	(Ukraine) Bukovyna Chernivtsi	Transfer	Free	
5 July 2025	GK	(Ukraine) Oleksandr Kemkin	22	(Ukraine) Kryvbas Kryvyi Rih	Loan		
7 July 2025	FW	(Ukraine) Vadym Sydun	20	(Ukraine) Epitsentr Kamianets-Podilskyi	Transfer	Free	
15 July 2025	MF	(Ukraine) Maksym Chekh	26	(Ukraine) Obolon Kyiv	Transfer	Free	
21 July 2025	GK	(Ukraine) Yakiv Kinareykin	21	(Spain) Villarreal B	Transfer	€700,000	
28 July 2025	DF	(Ukraine) Bohdan Veklyak	25	(Ukraine) FC Kudrivka	Transfer	Free	
5 September 2025	MF	(Ukraine) Illya Kvasnytsya	22	(Ukraine) Rukh Lviv	End of loan		
Winter
31 December 2025	MF	(Argentina) Patricio Tanda	23	(Argentina) Racing	End of loan		
8 January 2026	DF	(Ukraine) Pavlo Polehenko	31	(Ukraine) Obolon Kyiv	Transfer	Free	
12 January 2026	FW	(Ukraine) Ihor Krasnopir	23	(Ukraine) Polissya Zhytomyr	Transfer	€1,200,000	
14 January 2026	MF	(Ukraine) Vladyslav Klymenko	31	(Ukraine) Chornomorets Odesa	Transfer	Free	
21 January 2026	DF	(Ecuador) Diego Palacios	26	(Brazil) Corinthians	End of loan		
5 February 2026	MF	(Spain) Pablo Álvarez	28	(Kazakhstan) Aktobe	Transfer	Free	
6 February 2026	FW	(Brazil) Igor Neves	26	(Ukraine) Rukh Lviv	Loan		
28 February 2026	DF	(Ukraine) Mykola Kyrychok	19	(Ukraine) Rukh Lviv	Loan		
2 March 2026	MF	(Ukraine) Oleh Fedor	21	(Ukraine) Polissya Zhytomyr	Transfer	€1,800,000	
5 March 2026	MF	(Brazil) Fabiano	19	(Brazil) Palmeiras	Loan		

== Pre-season and friendlies ==
1 July 2025 Friendly	Karpaty Lviv	1–0	FC Kulykiv-Bilka	Bartativ
11:30 EEST (UTC+03:00)	Bruninho 51'	Report		Stadium: FC Karpaty Training Center

5 July 2025 Friendly	Karpaty Lviv	2–3	Ahrobiznes Volochysk	Bartativ
15:00 EEST (UTC+03:00)	Neves 20'; Kostenko 52'	Report	Tolochko 28'; Voytikhovskyi 43'; Len 78' (pen.)	Stadium: FC Karpaty Training Center

13 July 2025 Friendly	Wolfsberger AC (Austria)	3–3	Karpaty Lviv	Maria Alm, Austria
17:00 CEST (UTC+02:00)	Emeka 39'; Pink 42', 56' (pen.)	Report	Krasnopir 18' (pen.); Bruninho 47' (pen.); Shakh 86'	Stadium: Rudi Hasenauer Sportplatz

17 July 2025 Friendly	Karpaty Lviv	1–2	(Hungary) Győri ETO	Söchau, Austria
17:30 CEST (UTC+02:00)	Bruninho 10'	Report	Bumba 15'; Vitális 86'	Stadium: Kräuterdorfstadion

21 July 2025 Friendly	Karpaty Lviv	1–1	(United Arab Emirates) Sharjah FC	Söchau, Austria
17:00 CEST (UTC+02:00)	Krasnopir 88'	Report	Luanzinho 64'	Stadium: Kräuterdorfstadion

25 July 2025 Friendly	Karpaty Lviv	1–2	(England) Leicester City	Friedberg, Austria
11:30 CEST (UTC+02:00)	Karabin 48'	Report	Daka 50' (pen.), 73'	Stadium: Sportzentrum Friedberg; Referee: Lena Hirtl

20 January 2026 Friendly	Karpaty Lviv	1–2	(South Korea) Daejeon Hana Citizen	San Pedro del Pinatar, Spain
11:00 CET (UTC+01:00)	Karabin 9'; Edson (red card) 38'	Report	Diogo 26'; João Victor (red card) 38'; Kim Jin-ya 84'	Stadium: Pinatar Arena

22 January 2026 Friendly	Murcia B (Spain)	0–3	Karpaty Lviv	San Pedro del Pinatar, Spain
11:00 CET (UTC+01:00)		Report	Miroshnichenko 39'; Shakh 64'; Kostenko 88'	Stadium: Pinatar Arena

28 January 2026 Friendly	Karpaty Lviv	2–3	(Denmark) Odense	Albir, Spain
15:00 CET (UTC+01:00)	Stênio 45'; Chaban 69'	Report	Ganaus 42'; Suhonen 43'; Niemiec 72'

29 January 2026 Friendly	Karpaty Lviv	1–1	(Sweden) Värnamo	San Pedro del Pinatar, Spain
17:00 CET (UTC+01:00)	Miroshnichenko 74' (pen.)	Report	Antonsson 26'	Stadium: Pinatar Arena

7 February 2026 Friendly	Karpaty Lviv	0–1	(Sweden) GAIS	Albir, Spain
12:00 CET (UTC+01:00)		Report	Salter 56'

8 February 2026 Friendly	Karpaty Lviv	1–2	(Iceland) Stjarnan	Algorfa, Spain
12:00 CET (UTC+01:00)	Turay 23' (o.g.)	Report	Kristjánsson 4'; Brink 47'

13 February 2026 Friendly	Karpaty Lviv	1–0	(China) Tianjin Jinmen Tiger	Algorfa, Spain
11:30 CET (UTC+01:00)	Chen 83' (o.g.)	Report

14 March 2026 Friendly	Karpaty Lviv	3–1	Bukovyna Chernivtsi	Bartativ
13:00 EET (UTC+02:00)	Stênio 20', 46'; Shakh 24'	Report	Boychuk (penalty missed) 28'; Kozhushko (penalty missed) 65'; Voytikhovskyi 81'	Stadium: FC Karpaty Training Center

25 March 2026 Friendly	Karpaty Lviv	1–0	FC Kulykiv-Bilka	Bartativ
12:00 EET (UTC+02:00)	Shakh 28'	Report		Stadium: FC Karpaty Training Center

15 April 2026 Friendly	Karpaty Lviv	5–0	Feniks-Mariupol	Bartativ
12:00 EEST (UTC+03:00)	Karabin 6', 44'; Stetskov 14'; Shakh 70'; Chachua 85'	Report		Stadium: FC Karpaty Training Center

== Competitions ==
=== Overall ===
Competition	Record							
Competition	Pld	W	D	L	GF	GA	GD	Win %
Premier League	30	10	11	9	40	31	+9	33.33
Cup	2	1	0	1	8	1	+7	50.00
Total	32	11	11	10	48	32	+16	34.38

Last updated: 23 May 2026
Source: Competitions

=== Premier League ===
==== League table ====
Pos	Team	Pld	W	D	L	GF	GA	GD	Pts
7	Kryvbas Kryvyi Rih	30	13	9	8	53	46	+7	48
8	Zorya Luhansk	30	12	10	8	42	36	+6	46
9	Karpaty Lviv	30	10	11	9	40	31	+9	41
10	Epitsentr Kamianets-Podilskyi	30	8	8	14	36	45	−9	32
11	Veres Rivne	30	7	10	13	26	40	−14	31 (Note: Ranked on head-to-head points: Veres Rivne 4, Obolon Kyiv 1)

Updated to match(es) played on 24 May 2026. Source: upl.ua
Rules for classification: 1) Points; 2) Head-to-head points; 3) Head-to-head goal difference; 4) Head-to-head goals scored; 5) Goal difference; 6) Goals scored; 7) Draw or "Golden match" if two teams tied for title (Article 22, paragraph 3).
Notes:

Teams that placed 13th and 14th in the 2025–26 Ukrainian Premier League play two-leg play-off with the third and fourth teams of the 2025–26 Ukrainian First League.

Refusal from relegation play-off: Rukh Lviv (Note: The participation of FC Rukh in the relegation playoffs is to be confirmed, since the owner announced that the club may not participate in that stage.)

This round includes 2 clubs from Premier League: FC Oleksandriya and Kudrivka; 2 clubs from First League: Livyi Bereh Kyiv or Chornomorets Odesa and Ahrobiznes Volochysk.

Team 1	Agg.	Team 2	1st leg	2nd leg
FC Oleksandriya	x–x	Livyi Bereh Kyiv or Chornomorets Odesa		
Ahrobiznes Volochysk	x–x	Kudrivka		

==== First Semi-final ====
FC Oleksandriya	v	Livyi Bereh Kyiv or Chornomorets Odesa

Livyi Bereh Kyiv or Chornomorets Odesa	v	FC Oleksandriya

==== Second Semi-final ====
Ahrobiznes Volochysk	v	Kudrivka

Kudrivka	v	Ahrobiznes Volochysk

==== Results summary ====
Overall								Home						Away					
Pld	W	D	L	GF	GA	GD	Pts	W	D	L	GF	GA	GD	W	D	L	GF	GA	GD
30	10	11	9	40	31	+9	41	4	6	5	20	18	+2	6	5	4	20	13	+7

Last updated: 23 May 2026.
Source: Competitive matches

==== Results by round ====
Round	1	2	3	4	5	6	7	8	9	10	11	12	13	14	15	16	17	18	19	20	21	22	23	24	25	26	27	28	29	30
Ground	H	H	A	A	H	A	H	A	H	H	A	H	H	A	A	A	A	H	H	A	H	A	H	A	A	H	A	A	H	H
Result	L	D	D	D	D	W	D	W	L	D	W	W	L	D	L	L	L	L	D	W	W	W	W	D	W	D	L	D	W	L
Position	16	12	13	14	12	11	10	8	10	10	9	8	9	9	9	9	10	12	11	9	9	9	9	8	8	9	9	9	9	9

Updated to match(es) played on 23 May 2026. Source: Competitive matches
A = Away; H = Home; W = Win; D = Draw; L = Loss

==== Matches ====
3 August 2025 1	Karpaty Lviv	0–2	Polissya Zhytomyr	Lviv
18:00 EEST (UTC+03:00)	Álvarez (yellow card) 68'; Bruninho (yellow card) 78'; Baboglo (yellow card) 87'	Report	Lyednyev (yellow card) 13'; Hayduchyk 29'; Nazarenko 38' (pen.); Talles (yellow card) 68'; Filippov (penalty missed) 89'	Stadium: Ukraina Stadium; Attendance: 6,490; Referee: Dmytro Panchyshyn

10 August 2025 2	Karpaty Lviv	3–3	Shakhtar Donetsk	Lviv
18:00 EEST (UTC+03:00)	Neves 18'; Krasnopir (yellow card) 64', (goal) 90+1'; Bruninho 77'; Miroshnichenko (yellow card) 90+8'	Report	Newerton 9'; Elias 23'; Azarovi (yellow card) 28'; Konoplya (yellow card) 45'; Alisson 82'	Stadium: Ukraina Stadium; Attendance: 6,500; Referee: Mykola Balakin

16 August 2025 3	Kolos Kovalivka	1–1	Karpaty Lviv	Kovalivka
15:30 EEST (UTC+03:00)	Klymchuk 20'; Rrapaj (red card) 35'; Alefirenko (yellow card) 55'	Report	Chachua (yellow card) 43'; Krasnopir 67'; Álvarez (yellow card) 77'; Miroshnichenko (yellow card) 81'; Pedroso (yellow card) 81'; Baboglo (yellow card) 87'	Stadium: Kolos Stadium; Attendance: 1,287; Referee: Oleh Kohut

29 August 2025 4	FC Kudrivka	2–2	Karpaty Lviv	Kyiv
18:00 EEST (UTC+03:00)	Rohozynskyi 3'; Morozko (yellow card) 32'; Storchous 43'; Losenko (yellow card) 70'; Svityukha (yellow card) 72'; Nahnoynyi (yellow card) 90+5'	Report	Pedroso (yellow card) 22', (goal) 90+6'; Baboglo (red card) 26'; Miroshnichenko (yellow card) 41'; Álvarez 52'	Stadium: Obolon Arena; Attendance: 1,053; Referee: Viktor Kopiyevskyi

14 September 2025 5	Karpaty Lviv	1–1	SC Poltava	Lviv
18:00 EEST (UTC+03:00)	Fabiano 68', (yellow card) 85'; Jean Pedroso (yellow card) 90'	Report	Odaryuk 21'; Veremiyenko (yellow card) 70'; Khodulya (yellow card) 85'	Stadium: Ukraina Stadium; Attendance: 3,600; Referee: Ihor Paskhal

22 September 2025 6	Obolon Kyiv	0–2	Karpaty Lviv	Kyiv
13:00 EEST (UTC+03:00)	Chernenko (yellow card) 55'; Ilyin (yellow card) 64'	Report	Lomnytskyi 5' (o.g.); Baboglo 51'; Álvarez (yellow card) 65'; Krasnopir (yellow card) 87'	Stadium: Obolon Arena; Attendance: 750; Referee: Oleksandr Afanasiev

27 September 2025 7	Karpaty Lviv	3–3	Dynamo Kyiv	Lviv
18:00 EEST (UTC+03:00)	Álvarez 24'; Bruninho 27'; Kostenko (yellow card) 71'; Miroshnichenko 90+3'	Report	Karavayev 43', 52'; Shaparenko 50'	Stadium: Ukraina Stadium; Attendance: 8,700; Referee: Vitaliy Romanov

4 October 2025 8	FC Oleksandriya	0–2	Karpaty Lviv	Oleksandriya
13:00 EEST (UTC+03:00)	Myshnyov (yellow card) 26'; Skorko (yellow card) 83'; Behiratche (yellow card) 85'	Report	Kostenko (yellow card) 24'; Bruninho 43' (pen.); Chachua (yellow card) 67'; Campos 71' (o.g.); Baboglo (yellow card) 79'	Stadium: Nika Stadium; Attendance: 1,104; Referee: Denys Shurman

19 October 2025 9	Karpaty Lviv	1–3	Epitsentr Kamianets-Podilskyi	Lviv
18:00 EEST (UTC+03:00)	Kostenko (yellow card) 45'; Vitor 62'	Report	Tanchyk (yellow card) 8'; Kyryukhantsev (yellow card) 45+1'; Myronyuk 57'; Klymets 61'; Ceberio (yellow card) 75'; Moroz 85'	Stadium: Ukraina Stadium; Attendance: 3,500; Referee: Yevhen Tsybulko

25 October 2025 10	Karpaty Lviv	0–0	Rukh Lviv	Lviv
15:30 EEST (UTC+03:00)	Vitor (yellow card) 12'; Pedroso (yellow card) 90+5'	Report	Edson (yellow card) 60'; Lyakh (yellow card) 90+5'	Stadium: Ukraina Stadium; Attendance: 5,000; Referee: Klym Zabroda

3 November 2025 11	LNZ Cherkasy	0–1	Karpaty Lviv	Cherkasy
15:30 EET (UTC+02:00)	Jashari (yellow card) 13'; Muravskyi (yellow card) 62'; Horin (yellow card) 74'	Report	Krasnopir 25', (yellow card) 62'; Domchak (yellow card) 54'; Álvarez (yellow card) 58'; Miroshnichenko (yellow card) 59'; Kyrychok (yellow card) 88'	Stadium: Cherkasy Arena; Attendance: 623; Referee: Viktor Kopiyevskyi

8 November 2025 12	Karpaty Lviv	1–0	Kryvbas Kryvyi Rih	Lviv
18:00 EET (UTC+02:00)	Baboglo (yellow card) 45+5'; Bruninho 47'	Report	Kemkin (red card) 16'; Tverdokhlib (yellow card) 36'	Stadium: Ukraina Stadium; Attendance: 3,500; Referee: Dmytro Panchyshyn

22 November 2025 13	Karpaty Lviv	1–2	Metalist 1925 Kharkiv	Lviv
13:00 EET (UTC+02:00)	Bruninho 39'; Adamyuk (yellow card) 62'; Tanda (yellow card) 84'	Report	Antyukh 21', 51'; Kalyuzhnyi (yellow card) 74'	Stadium: Ukraina Stadium; Attendance: 2,655; Referee: Mykola Balakin

29 November 2025 14	Veres Rivne	0–0	Karpaty Lviv	Rivne
18:00 EET (UTC+02:00)	Kharatin (yellow card) 34'; Wesley (yellow card) 64'; Hodia (yellow card) 78'	Report		Stadium: Avanhard Stadium; Attendance: 2,720; Referee: Oleksandr Afanasiev

5 December 2025 15	Zorya Luhansk	1–0	Karpaty Lviv	Kyiv
18:00 EET (UTC+02:00)	Budkivskyi 28', (yellow card) 85'	Report	Baboglo (yellow card) 81'	Stadium: Lobanovskyi Dynamo Stadium; Attendance: 389; Referee: Denys Shurman

13 December 2025 16	Polissya Zhytomyr	3–2	Karpaty Lviv	Zhytomyr
18:00 EET (UTC+02:00)	Hayduchyk 15'; Hutsulyak 27'; Braharu 52'	Report	Pedroso (yellow card) 47'; Kostenko 54'; Tanda (yellow card) 82'; Krasnopir 88'	Stadium: Tsentralnyi Stadion; Attendance: 1,894; Referee: Oleksandr Afanasiev

22 February 2026 17	Shakhtar Donetsk	3–0	Karpaty Lviv	Lviv
15:30 EET (UTC+02:00)	Traoré 67', 71', 82'; Marlon (yellow card) 77'	Report		Stadium: Arena Lviv; Attendance: 4,117; Referee: Oleksandr Afanasiev

1 March 2026 18	Karpaty Lviv	0–1	Kolos Kovalivka	Lviv
18:00 EET (UTC+02:00)	Faal (penalty missed) 14'; Sapuha (yellow card) 42'	Report	Klymchuk (penalty missed) 29'; Burda (yellow card) 42' (yellow-red card) 79'; Salabay 62'; Stankovski (yellow card) 86'; Bondarenko (yellow card) 90+5'	Stadium: Ukraina Stadium; Attendance: 4,200; Referee: Vitaliy Romanov

8 March 2026 19	Karpaty Lviv	1–1	FC Kudrivka	Lviv
15:30 EET (UTC+02:00)	Kostenko 5'; Stênio (yellow card) 90+4'	Report	Nahnoynyi (yellow card) 45+1'; Faryna (yellow card) 54'; Kozak 66'; Husiev (yellow card) 83'	Stadium: Ukraina Stadium; Attendance: 3,600; Referee: Yevhen Tsybulko

13 March 2026 20	SC Poltava	0–4	Karpaty Lviv	Lviv^{[a]}
13:00 EET (UTC+02:00)	Plakhtyr (penalty missed) 25'; Veremiyenko (yellow card) 63'	Report	Kostenko (yellow card) 21', (goal) 70'; Alkain 30'; Baboglo 50', (yellow card) 58'; Bruninho (yellow card) 65'; Faal 74'	Stadium: Ukraina Stadium; Attendance: 1,100; Referee: Oleksandr Kalyonov

22 March 2026 21	Karpaty Lviv	4–0	Obolon Kyiv	Lviv
18:00 EET (UTC+02:00)	Bruninho 22', 53'; Baboglo (yellow card) 33'; Alkain 37'; Edson (yellow card) 78'; Shakh 87'	Report	Kulakovskyi (yellow card) 27'; Zhovtenko (yellow card) 33'; Sukhanov (yellow card) 73'; Pryimak (yellow card) 78'	Stadium: Ukraina Stadium; Attendance: 4,150; Referee: Oleksiy Derevinskyi

4 April 2026 22	Dynamo Kyiv	0–1	Karpaty Lviv	Kyiv
18:00 EEST (UTC+03:00)	Brazhko (yellow card) 26'; Ponomarenko (yellow card) 84' (yellow-red card) 90+4'	Report	Faal 6'; Miroshnichenko (yellow card) 29'; Bruninho (yellow card) 73'; Lyakh (yellow card) 90+4'; Baboglo (yellow card) 90+4'; Kholod (yellow card) 90+4'; Domchak (yellow card) 90+8'	Stadium: Lobanovskyi Dynamo Stadium; Attendance: 4,300; Referee: Dmytro Panchyshyn

11 April 2026 23	Karpaty Lviv	2–0	FC Oleksandriya	Lviv
13:00 EEST (UTC+03:00)	Sapuha (yellow card) 41'; Miroshnichenko (yellow card) 45+1' (yellow-red card) 73'; Bruninho (yellow card) 56'; Kostenko 75'; Pedroso 90+2'	Report	Vashchenko (yellow card) 45+1'; Oharkov (red card) 87'	Stadium: Ukraina Stadium; Attendance: 2,110; Referee: Mykola Balakin

19 April 2026 24	Epitsentr Kamianets-Podilskyi	0–0	Karpaty Lviv	Kyiv Oblast
15:30 EEST (UTC+03:00)	Zaporozhets (yellow card) 90'; Kyryukhantsev (yellow card) 90+4'	Report	Lyakh (yellow card) 34'	Stadium: Arena Livyi Bereh; Attendance: 1,540; Referee: Klym Zabroda

25 April 2026 25	Rukh Lviv	0–3	Karpaty Lviv	Lviv
18:00 EEST (UTC+03:00)	Roman (yellow card) 3'; Pidhurskyi (yellow card) 80'	Report	Lyakh (yellow card) 25'; Kostenko 32'; Chachua 44'; Pedroso 56'	Stadium: Arena Lviv; Referee: Oleh Kohut

2 May 2026 26	Karpaty Lviv	0–0	LNZ Cherkasy	Lviv
18:00 EEST (UTC+03:00)	Chachua (yellow card) 45+2'; Pedroso (yellow card) 70'; Miroshnichenko (yellow card) 90+3'	Report	Tverdokhlib (yellow card) 19'; Mykytyshyn (penalty missed) 62', (yellow card) 64'; Jashari (yellow card) 76'	Stadium: Ukraina Stadium; Attendance: 5,500; Referee: Mykola Balakin

8 May 2026 27	Kryvbas Kryvyi Rih	1–0	Karpaty Lviv	Kryvyi Rih
14:15 EEST (UTC+03:00)	Seck 32'; Jones (yellow card) 44'; Mendoza (yellow card) 89'; Kemkin (yellow card) 90+3'	Report	Edson (yellow card) 30'; Shakh (yellow card) 59'; Kholod (yellow card) 90+1'	Stadium: Hirnyk Stadium; Attendance: 695; Referee: Oleksiy Derevinskyi

12 May 2026 28	Metalist 1925 Kharkiv	2–2	Karpaty Lviv	Zhytomyr
18:00 EEST (UTC+03:00)	Pavlyuk (yellow card) 27'; Zabërgja 41', (yellow card) 45'; Itodo (yellow card) 49', (goal) 65'; Kalyuzhnyi (yellow card) 59'; Krupskyi (yellow card) 87'	Report	Stetskov (yellow card) 49'; Chachua 52', 60' (pen.); Kostenko (yellow card) 70'	Stadium: Tsentralnyi Stadion; Attendance: 550; Referee: Denys Shurman

17 May 2026 29	Karpaty Lviv	2–0	Veres Rivne	Lviv
18:00 EEST (UTC+03:00)	Baboglo 54', 70'; Eriki (yellow card) 63'; Alkain (yellow card) 88'; Kostenko (yellow card) 90+9'	Report	Stamoulis (yellow card) 88'; Checher (yellow card) 88'; Cojuhar (yellow card) 90+2'	Stadium: Ukraina Stadium; Attendance: 4,550; Referee: Serhiy Zadyran jr.

23 May 2026 30	Karpaty Lviv	1–2	Zorya Luhansk	Lviv
18:00 EEST (UTC+03:00)	Bruninho 30'; Miroshnichenko (yellow card) 58'; Baboglo (yellow card) 77'; Kholod (yellow card) 90+6'; Eriki (yellow card) 90+6'	Report	Kushnirenko (yellow card) 11'; Jordan (yellow card) 37'; Vantukh 73'; Mićin 89'; Janjić (yellow card) 90'; Perduta (yellow card) 90+6'; Budkivskyi (yellow card) 90+6'	Stadium: Ukraina Stadium; Attendance: 5,200; Referee: Oleksandr Afanasiev

- ^{a} Originally to be played at Zirka Stadium in Kropyvnytskyi. Venue changed due to harsh winter conditions which rendered the pitch unplayable.

=== Ukrainian Cup ===
24 August 2025 Round of 64	Penuel Kryvyi Rih	0–8	Karpaty Lviv	Lviv^{[b]}
13:00 EEST (UTC+03:00)	Matko (yellow card) 60'	Report	Adamyuk 24', 42'; Krasnopir 47'; Vitor 55'; Klymenko 61'; Tanda 67'; Bruninho 82'; Kyrychok (yellow card) 86'; Neves 90'	Stadium: Ukraina Stadium; Attendance: 2,500; Referee: Dmytro Kubriak

18 September 2025 Round of 32	Bukovyna Chernivtsi	1–0	Karpaty Lviv	Chernivtsi
15:30 EEST (UTC+03:00)	Kozhushko 17'; Boychuk (yellow card) 22'; Dakhnovskyi (yellow card) 34'	Report	Baboglo (yellow card) 39'; Klymenko (yellow card) 59'	Stadium: Bukovyna Stadium; Attendance: 4,435; Referee: Yevhen Tsybulko

- ^{b} Originally to be played at Oleksandr Povorozniuk Stadium in Volodymyrivka, Oleksandriia Raion. Penuel decided to play the game in Lviv after Karpaty agreed to offset costs.

== Statistics ==
=== Appearances and goals ===
No.	Pos	Nat	Player	Total		Premier League		Cup	
No.	Pos	Nat	Player	Apps	Goals	Apps	Goals	Apps	Goals
Goalkeepers
1	GK	(Ukraine) UKR	Nazar Domchak	29	0	27	0	2	0
30	GK	(Ukraine) UKR	Andriy Klishchuk	3	0	3	0	0	0
Defenders
3	DF	(Ukraine) UKR	Volodymyr Adamyuk	12	2	5+5	0	2	2
4	DF	(Moldova) MDA	Vladislav Baboglo	27	4	26	4	1	0
5	DF	(Ukraine) UKR	Andriy Buleza	1	0	0+1	0	0	0
11	DF	(Ukraine) UKR	Denys Miroshnichenko	25	1	20+4	1	1	0
22	DF	(Ukraine) UKR	Yurii Kokodyniak	1	0	0	0	1	0
44	DF	(Ukraine) UKR	Vitaliy Kholod	10	0	10	0	0	0
47	DF	(Brazil) BRA	Jean Pedroso	22	3	17+4	3	1	0
55	DF	(Ukraine) UKR	Tymur Stetskov	2	0	1+1	0	0	0
73	DF	(Ukraine) UKR	Rostyslav Lyakh	14	0	14	0	0	0
77	DF	(Ukraine) UKR	Oleksiy Sych	18	0	13+5	0	0	0
Midfielders
7	MF	(Brazil) BRA	Paulo Vitor	26	2	14+10	1	1+1	1
8	MF	(Ukraine) UKR	Ambrosiy Chachua	31	3	28+2	3	0+1	0
10	MF	(Brazil) BRA	Stênio	5	0	2+3	0	0	0
14	MF	(Ukraine) UKR	Illya Kvasnytsya	9	0	0+8	0	1	0
15	MF	(Ukraine) UKR	Valentyn Rubchynskyi	9	0	3+6	0	0	0
16	MF	(Ukraine) UKR	Ivan Chaban	1	0	0	0	0+1	0
18	MF	(Brazil) BRA	Eriki	8	0	2+6	0	0	0
19	MF	(Ukraine) UKR	Yaroslav Karabin	20	0	4+14	0	1+1	0
20	MF	(Ukraine) UKR	Marko Sapuha	9	0	8+1	0	0	0
26	MF	(Ukraine) UKR	Yan Kostenko	26	5	24+1	5	1	0
33	MF	(Ukraine) UKR	Artur Shakh	19	1	8+11	1	0	0
35	MF	(Brazil) BRA	Edson Fernando	8	0	5+3	0	0	0
37	MF	(Brazil) BRA	Bruninho	28	9	22+4	8	0+2	1
70	MF	(Spain) ESP	Xeber Alkain	14	2	11+3	2	0	0
Forwards
28	FW	(Ukraine) UKR	Oleksandr Diedov	2	0	0+2	0	0	0
99	FW	(The Gambia) GAM	Baboucarr Faal	10	2	10	2	0	0
Players who left during the season
2	DF	(Ukraine) UKR	Mykola Kyrychok	2	0	1	0	1	0
9	MF	(Brazil) BRA	Fabiano	12	1	0+10	1	0+2	0
10	FW	(Brazil) BRA	Igor Neves	16	2	6+8	1	0+2	1
17	MF	(Ukraine) UKR	Oleh Fedor	11	0	3+6	0	2	0
18	MF	(Ukraine) UKR	Vladyslav Klymenko	11	1	1+8	0	2	1
21	MF	(Argentina) ARG	Patricio Tanda	14	1	8+4	0	2	1
23	MF	(Spain) ESP	Pablo Álvarez	13	2	12+1	2	0	0
25	DF	(Ecuador) ECU	Diego Palacios	2	0	1	0	1	0
28	DF	(Ukraine) UKR	Pavlo Polehenko	11	0	11	0	0	0
95	FW	(Ukraine) UKR	Ihor Krasnopir	18	5	10+6	4	2	1

Source: Competitions

Last updated: 23 May 2026

=== Goalscorers ===
Rank	No.	Pos	Nat	Name	Premier League	Cup	Total
1	37	MF	(Brazil)	Bruninho	8	1	9
2	95	FW	(Ukraine)	Ihor Krasnopir	4	1	5
	26	MF	(Ukraine)	Yan Kostenko	5	0	5
4	4	DF	(Moldova)	Vladislav Baboglo	4	0	4
5	47	DF	(Brazil)	Jean Pedroso	3	0	3
	8	MF	(Ukraine)	Ambrosiy Chachua	3	0	3
7	3	DF	(Ukraine)	Volodymyr Adamyuk	0	2	2
	10	FW	(Brazil)	Igor Neves	1	1	2
	23	MF	(Spain)	Pablo Álvarez	2	0	2
	7	MF	(Brazil)	Paulo Vitor	1	1	2
	70	MF	(Spain)	Xeber Alkain	2	0	2
	99	FW	(The Gambia)	Baboucarr Faal	2	0	2
				Own goal	2	0	2
14	18	MF	(Ukraine)	Vladyslav Klymenko	0	1	1
	21	MF	(Argentina)	Patricio Tanda	0	1	1
	9	MF	(Brazil)	Fabiano	1	0	1
	11	DF	(Ukraine)	Denys Miroshnichenko	1	0	1
	33	MF	(Ukraine)	Artur Shakh	1	0	1
				Total	40	8	48

Last updated: 23 May 2026

=== Clean sheets ===
Rank	No.	Pos	Nat	Name	Premier League	Cup	Total
1	1	GK	(Ukraine)	Nazar Domchak	14	1	15
				Total	14	1	15

Last updated: 17 May 2026

=== Disciplinary record ===
No.	Pos	Nat	Player	Premier League			Cup			Total		
No.	Pos	Nat	Player	Booked	(yellow card) (yellow-red card)	Sent off (straight red)	Booked	(yellow card) (yellow-red card)	Sent off (straight red)	Booked	(yellow card) (yellow-red card)	Sent off (straight red)
1	GK	(Ukraine)	Nazar Domchak	2	0	0	0	0	0	2	0	0
2	DF	(Ukraine)	Mykola Kyrychok	1	0	0	1	0	0	2	0	0
3	DF	(Ukraine)	Volodymyr Adamyuk	1	0	0	0	0	0	1	0	0
4	DF	(Moldova)	Vladislav Baboglo	9	0	1	1	0	0	10	0	1
7	MF	(Brazil)	Paulo Vitor	1	0	0	0	0	0	1	0	0
8	MF	(Ukraine)	Ambrosiy Chachua	3	0	0	0	0	0	3	0	0
9	MF	(Brazil)	Fabiano	1	0	0	0	0	0	1	0	0
10	MF	(Brazil)	Stênio	1	0	0	0	0	0	1	0	0
11	DF	(Ukraine)	Denys Miroshnichenko	7	1	0	0	0	0	7	1	0
18	MF	(Ukraine)	Vladyslav Klymenko	0	0	0	1	0	0	1	0	0
18	MF	(Brazil)	Eriki	2	0	0	0	0	0	2	0	0
20	MF	(Ukraine)	Marko Sapuha	2	0	0	0	0	0	2	0	0
21	MF	(Argentina)	Patricio Tanda	2	0	0	0	0	0	2	0	0
23	MF	(Spain)	Pablo Álvarez	4	0	0	0	0	0	4	0	0
26	MF	(Ukraine)	Yan Kostenko	6	0	0	0	0	0	6	0	0
33	MF	(Ukraine)	Artur Shakh	1	0	0	0	0	0	1	0	0
35	MF	(Brazil)	Edson Fernando	2	0	0	0	0	0	2	0	0
37	MF	(Brazil)	Bruninho	4	0	0	0	0	0	4	0	0
44	DF	(Ukraine)	Vitaliy Kholod	3	0	0	0	0	0	3	0	0
47	DF	(Brazil)	Jean Pedroso	6	0	0	0	0	0	6	0	0
55	DF	(Ukraine)	Tymur Stetskov	1	0	0	0	0	0	1	0	0
70	MF	(Spain)	Xeber Alkain	1	0	0	0	0	0	1	0	0
73	DF	(Ukraine)	Rostyslav Lyakh	3	0	0	0	0	0	3	0	0
95	FW	(Ukraine)	Ihor Krasnopir	3	0	0	0	0	0	3	0	0
			Total	66	1	1	3	0	0	69	1	1

Last updated: 23 May 2026

== Sources ==
- Official website
