= Nazariy Rusyn =

Ukrainian footballer

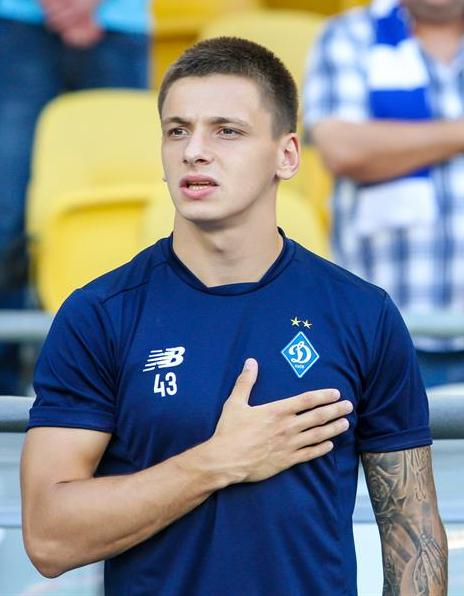
- Rusyn with Dynamo Kyiv

Personal information
- Full name: Nazariy Orestovych Rusyn
- Date of birth: 25 October 1998 (age 28)
- Place of birth: Novoyavorivsk, Ukraine
- Height: 1.77 m (5 ft 10 in)
- Position: Forward

Team information
- Current team: Karpaty Lviv
- Number: 31

Youth career
- Jantarnyi Novoyavorivsk
- 2011–2015: Lviv
- 2015–2017: Dynamo Kyiv

Senior career*
Years	Team	Apps	(Gls)
2018–2022	Dynamo Kyiv	33	(7)
2019	→ Zorya Luhansk (loan)	14	(5)
2021	→ Legia Warsaw (loan)	0	(0)
2021	→ Legia Warsaw II (loan)	1	(0)
2021–2022	→ Dnipro-1 (loan)	8	(1)
2022	→ Chornomorets Odesa (loan)	0	(0)
2022–2023	Zorya Luhansk	32	(14)
2023–2026	Sunderland	29	(2)
2025	→ Hajduk Split (loan)	16	(0)
2025–2026	→ Arka Gdynia (loan)	23	(4)
2026–	Karpaty Lviv	4	(1)

International career
2015	Ukraine U17	3	(0)
2015	Ukraine U18	6	(1)
2017	Ukraine U19	3	(1)
2018–2019	Ukraine U21	11	(7)
- * Club domestic league appearances and goals as of 12:00, 31 August 2026 (UTC)

Nazariy Orestovych Rusyn (Ukrainian: Назарій Орестович Русин; born 25 October 1998) is a Ukrainian professional footballer who plays as a forward for Ukrainian Premier League club Karpaty Lviv.

== Club career ==
Born in Novoyavorivsk, just to the west of Lviv city, Rusyn is a product of the Lviv and Dynamo Kyiv academies. Before moving to Lviv in 2011, Rusyn's first club was FK Jantarnyi Novoyavorivsk in his hometown, where his first coach was Yuriy Triska.

=== Dynamo Kyiv ===
He played for Dynamo in the Ukrainian Premier League Reserves and in November 2017 he was promoted to the senior squad team. Rusyn made his debut for the Dynamo's senior squad in a match against Albanian Skënderbeu Korçë in the 2017–18 UEFA Europa League on 23 November 2017 and scored on 90'+1 minute.

Also he made his debut in the Ukrainian Premier League for Dynamo Kyiv on 26 November 2017, playing in a winning match against FC Stal Kamianske.

As a player of Zorya Luhansk on loan from Dynamo in September 2019 Rusyn was recognised as a player of the month in the Ukrainian Premier League.

==== Legia Warsaw ====
On 23 February 2021, Rusyn moved to Polish club Legia Warsaw, on a loan deal until December 2021, joining his compatriot Artem Shabanov. The deal included an option to buy. On 3 March 2021, he made his debut for Legia in a 1–2 Polish Cup defeat against Piast Gliwice at the Stadion Wojska Polskiego. On 6 April 2021, after refusing to partake in Legia II's match against Legionovia Legionowo three days prior, Rusyn was moved to the reserve team for two weeks.

=== Sunderland ===
On 1 September 2023, Sunderland announced the transfer of Rusyn on a four-year contract for an undisclosed fee. On 24 September, he made his debut for the club in a 1–0 home defeat to Cardiff. On 1 January 2024, Rusyn scored his first goal for Sunderland in a 2–0 home win against Preston.

=== Hajduk Split ===
On 25 January 2025, Hajduk Split announced Rusyn's loan move until the end of season.

=== Arka Gdynia ===
On 2 September 2025, Rusyn was sent on loan to Polish club Arka Gdynia for the remainder of the season.

=== Karpaty Lviv ===
On 1 July 2026, Rusyn returned to Ukraine, joining Karpaty Lviv on a three-year contract with an option for a fourth.

== International career ==
In October 2023, Rusyn received his first call-up to the Ukraine senior national team for two UEFA Euro 2024 qualifying matches against North Macedonia and Malta.

== Career statistics ==
As of match played 31 August 2026

Appearances and goals by club, season and competition
Club	Season	League			National cup (Note: Includes Ukrainian Cup, Polish Cup, FA Cup, Croatian Cup)		League cup (Note: Includes EFL Cup)		Europe		Other		Total	
Club	Season	Division	Apps	Goals	Apps	Goals	Apps	Goals	Apps	Goals	Apps	Goals	Apps	Goals
Dynamo Kyiv	2017–18	Ukrainian Premier League	1	0	1	1	—		1 (Note: Appearance(s) in UEFA Europa League)	1	0	0	3	2
Dynamo Kyiv	2018–19	Ukrainian Premier League	19	5	—		—		5 (Note: One appearance in UEFA Champions League, four appearances in UEFA Europa League)	0	0	0	24	5
Dynamo Kyiv	2019–20	Ukrainian Premier League	12	2	1	0	—		0	0	0	0	13	2
Dynamo Kyiv	2020–21	Ukrainian Premier League	1	0	0	0	—		0	0	0	0	1	0
Dynamo Kyiv	Total		33	7	2	1	—		6	1	0	0	41	9
Zorya Luhansk (loan)	2019–20	Ukrainian Premier League	14	5	0	0	—		3	2	—		17	7
Legia Warsaw (loan)	2020–21	Ekstraklasa	0	0	1	0	—		0	0	—		1	0
Legia Warsaw II (loan)	2020–21	III liga, group I	1	0	—		—		—		—		1	0
Dnipro-1 (loan)	2021–22	Ukrainian Premier League	8	1	2	1	—		—		—		10	2
Zorya Luhansk	2022–23	Ukrainian Premier League	30	13	0	0	—		—		—		30	13
Zorya Luhansk	2023–24	Ukrainian Premier League	2	1	0	0	—		—		—		2	1
Zorya Luhansk	Total		32	14	0	0	—		—		—		32	14
Sunderland	2023–24	Championship	21	2	1	0	0	0	—		0	0	22	2
Sunderland	2024–25	Championship	8	0	1	0	1	0	—		—		10	0
Sunderland	Total		29	2	2	0	1	0	—		—		32	2
Hajduk Split (loan)	2024–25	Croatian Football League	16	0	1	0	—		—		—		17	0
Arka Gdynia (loan)	2025–26	Ekstraklasa	23	4	2	0	—		—		—		25	4
Karpaty Lviv	2026–27	Ukrainian Premier League	4	1	0	0	—		—		—		4	1
Career total			156	33	10	2	1	0	9	3	0	0	176	38

== Honours ==
Individual

- Ukrainian Premier League Player of the Month: August 2019, May–June 2023
- Ukrainian Premier League Best Player of the Round: 2022–23 Round 3
