= Andriy Sapuha =

Ukrainian footballer and coach

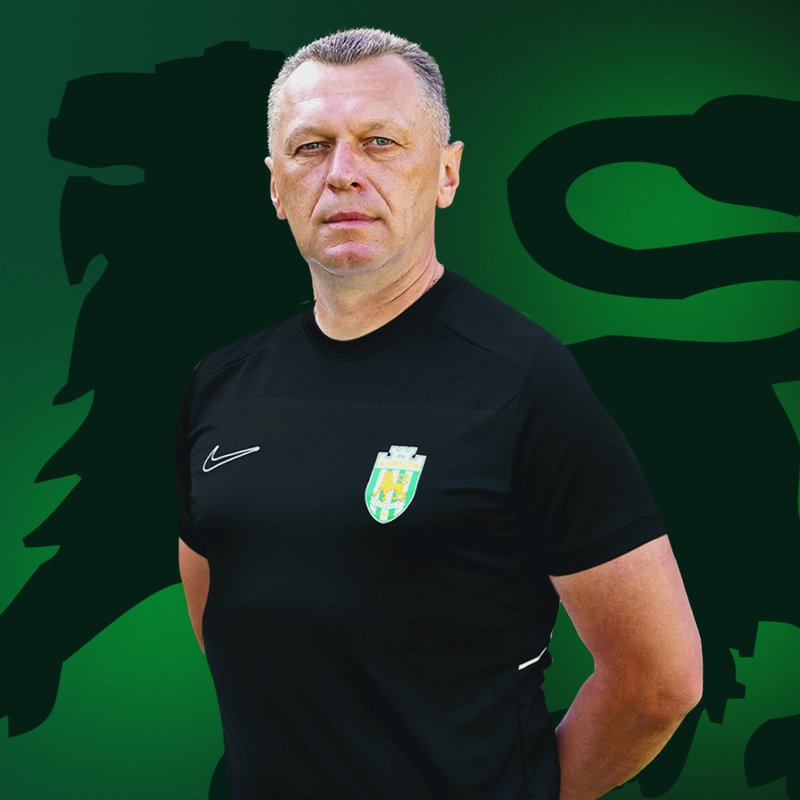

Personal information
- Full name: Andriy Mykhailovych Sapuha
- Date of birth: 4 October 1976 (age 50)
- Place of birth: Teisariv, Lviv Oblast, Ukrainian SSR
- Height: 1.79 m (5 ft 10 in)
- Position: Midfielder

Youth career
- LUFK Lviv

Senior career*
Years	Team	Apps	(Gls)
1992	Tryzub Philadelphia		
1993	Karpaty Lviv	2	(0)
1993	Hazovyk Komarno	1	(0)
1993	Hazovyk-Skala Stryi	15	(0)
1995–1998	Karpaty Lviv	72	(5)
1997–1998	→ Karpaty-2 Lviv	26	(6)
1998–2000	Torpedo Moscow	29	(0)
1998–2000	→ Torpedo-d Moscow	13	(1)
2000	Lokomotiv Nizhny Novgorod	11	(2)
2001	Gazovik-Gazprom Izhevsk	20	(1)
2002–2003	Karpaty Lviv	20	(0)
2002–2003	→ Karpaty-2 Lviv	24	(1)
2004–2005	Zakarpattia Uzhhorod	56	(0)
2006	Fakel Voronezh	22	(0)
2007	Lviv	11	(0)
2007–2008	Metallurg-Kuzbass Novokuznetsk	23	(0)
2008	Atyrau	13	(0)
2009–2010	FC Naftusia Skhidnytsia		
2011	FC Karyer Torchynovychi		

Managerial career
- 2016–2017: Karpaty Lviv (assistant)
- 2017–2018: Karpaty Lviv U-19 (assistant)
- 2018–2020: Volyn Lutsk (assistant)
- 2020–: Karpaty Lviv (assistant)
- * Club domestic league appearances and goals

Andriy Mykhailovych Sapuha (Ukrainian: Андрій Михайлович Сапуга; born 4 October 1976) is a Ukrainian professional football coach and a former player. He is an assistant coach with Karpaty Lviv.

== Career ==
He made his professional debut in the Ukrainian Premier League in 1992 for FC Karpaty Lviv.

== Personal life ==
He has a son Marko, born in 2003, who also is a professional football player.

== Honours ==
- Ukrainian Premier League bronze: 1998.
- Russian Premier League bronze: 2000.
