= Yuriy-Volodymyr Hereta =

Ukrainian footballer

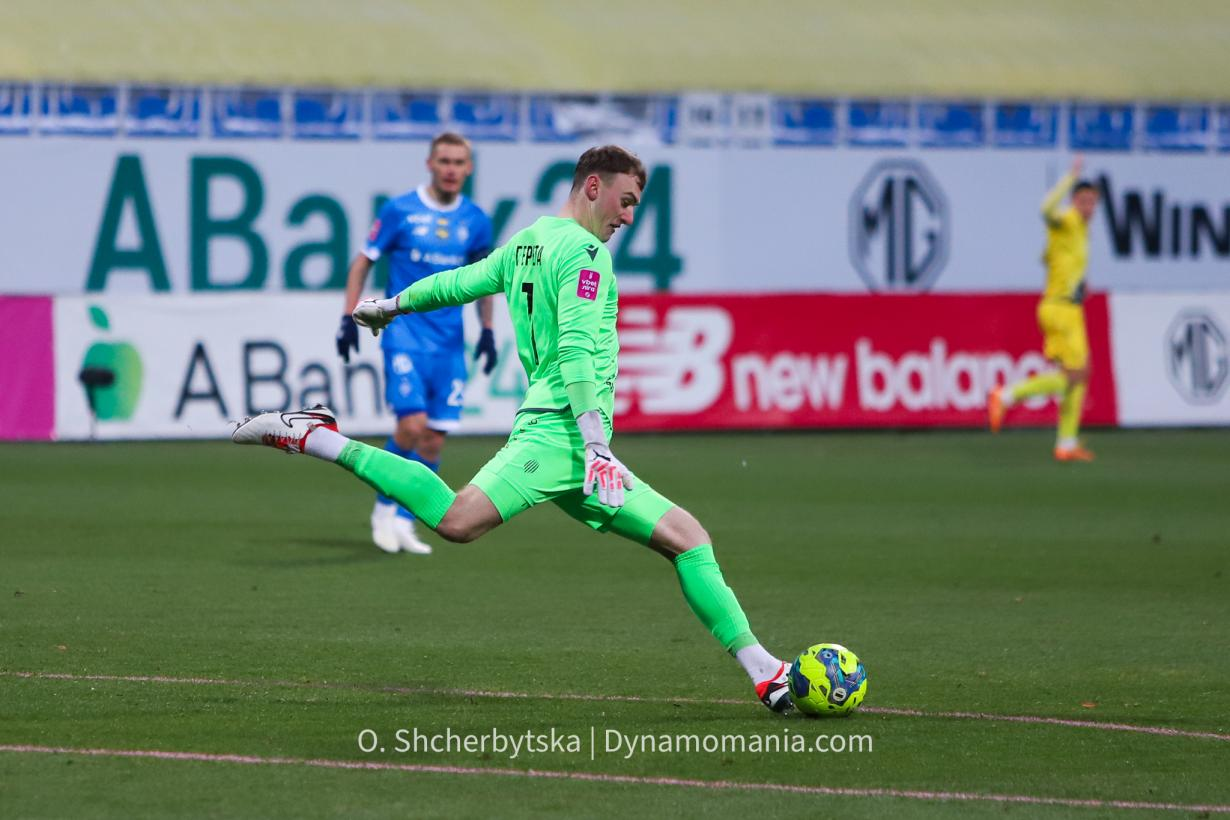
- Hereta playing for Rukh Lviv in 2023

Personal information
- Full name: Yuriy-Volodymyr Ostapovych Hereta
- Date of birth: 30 January 2004 (age 22)
- Place of birth: Lviv, Ukraine
- Height: 1.90 m (6 ft 3 in)
- Position: Goalkeeper

Team information
- Current team: Rukh Lviv
- Number: 1

Youth career
- 2012–2014: Poshuk-Opir Lviv
- 2014–2020: Karpaty Lviv

Senior career*
Years	Team	Apps	(Gls)
2020	Karpaty Lviv	0	(0)
2020–	Rukh Lviv	33	(0)
2023–2024	→ Rukh-2 Lviv	23	(0)

International career^{‡}
2019	Ukraine U16	2	(0)
2022–2023	Ukraine U19	5	(0)
- * Club domestic league appearances and goals as of 3 June 2026 ‡ National team caps and goals as of 7 October 2023

Yuriy-Volodymyr Ostapovych Hereta (Ukrainian: Юрій-Володимир Остапович Герета; born 30 January 2004) is a Ukrainian professional footballer who plays as a goalkeeper for Rukh Lviv.

== Career ==
Hereta is a product of Poshuk-Opir (first coach Volodymyr Mandzynyak) and Karpaty Lviv (first coach Vitaliy Ponomaryov) academies in his native Lviv.

After he spent six seasons in the Karpaty youth team and played in the Ukrainian Premier League Reserves, he signed a contract with Rukh Lviv in September 2020.

Hereta made his debut for FC Rukh as a second-half substitute against FC Zorya Luhansk on 25 October 2020 in the Ukrainian Premier League.
