= Patricio Tanda =

Argentine professional footballer

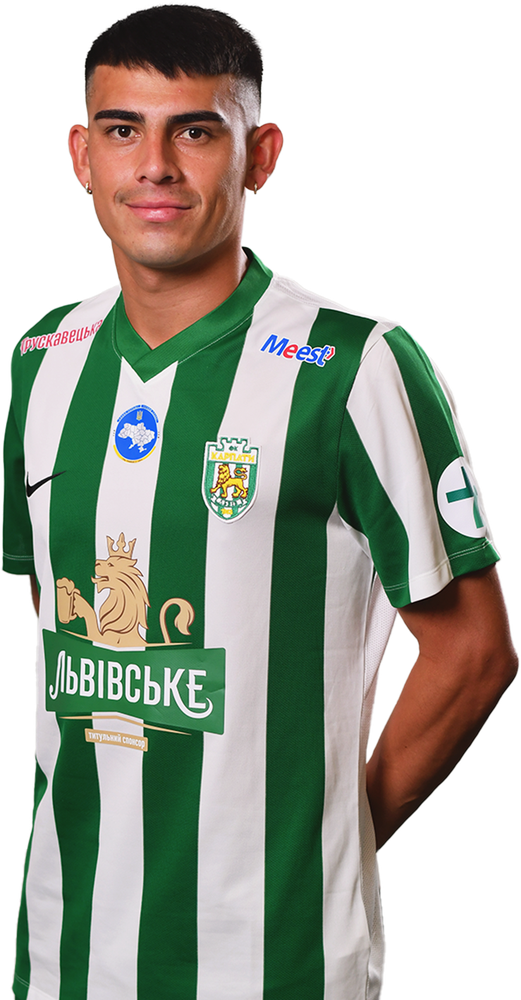

Personal information
- Full name: Patricio Damián Tanda
- Date of birth: 5 April 2002 (age 24)
- Place of birth: Lomas de Zamora, Argentina
- Height: 1.85 m (6 ft 1 in)
- Position: Midfielder

Team information
- Current team: Karpaty Lviv (on loan from Racing Club)
- Number: 21

Youth career
- Alberdi (B)
- Almafuerte (SJ)
- 2010–2018: Boca Juniors
- → Cultural Mármol (loan)
- → Olimpia (LdZ) (loan)
- 2018–2020: Racing Club

Senior career*
Years	Team	Apps	(Gls)
2020–	Racing Club	5	(0)
2021	→ Ferro Carril Oeste (loan)	5	(0)
2023–2024	→ Unión de Santa Fe (loan)	28	(0)
2025–	→ Karpaty Lviv (loan)	21	(0)
- * Club domestic league appearances and goals as of 20 December 2025

Patricio Damián Tanda (born 5 April 2002) is an Argentine professional footballer who plays as a midfielder for Karpaty Lviv, on loan from Racing Club.

== Career ==
Tanda had early youth career stints with Alberdi de Burzaco and Almafuerte de San José, which preceded the midfielder's arrival at Boca Juniors. Whilst with Boca, he also appeared for local clubs Cultural Mármol and Olimpia de Lomas de Zamora. 2018 saw Tanda depart Boca for Racing Club. He made the breakthrough into their first-team in November 2020, with the midfielder making his senior debut on 19 November in a 2–0 defeat away to Atlético Tucumán in the Copa de la Liga Profesional; he played the full duration, aged eighteen.

== Career statistics ==
As of 20 November 2020.

Appearances and goals by club, season and competition
Club	Season	League			Cup		League Cup		Continental		Other		Total	
Club	Season	Division	Apps	Goals	Apps	Goals	Apps	Goals	Apps	Goals	Apps	Goals	Apps	Goals
Racing Club	2020–21 (Note: Soccerway counts Copa de la Liga Profesional appearances as league appearances.)	Primera División	1	0	0	0	0	0	0	0	0	0	1	0
Career total			1	0	0	0	0	0	0	0	0	0	1	0
