= Vitaliy Kholod =

Ukrainian footballer

Personal information
- Full name: Vitaliy Ruslanovych Kholod
- Date of birth: 15 January 2004 (age 22)
- Place of birth: Lviv, Ukraine
- Height: 1.83 m (6 ft 0 in)
- Position: Centre-back

Team information
- Current team: Karpaty Lviv
- Number: 44

Youth career
- 2012–2013: Youth Sportive School #4 Lviv
- 2013–2020: Karpaty Lviv
- 2020–2022: Rukh Lviv

Senior career*
Years	Team	Apps	(Gls)
2022–2025	Rukh Lviv	64	(1)
2024	→ Rukh-2 Lviv	2	(0)
2026–	Karpaty Lviv	10	(0)

International career^{‡}
2022–2023	Ukraine U19	4	(1)
2025–	Ukraine U21	1	(0)
- * Club domestic league appearances and goals as of 3 June 2026 ‡ National team caps and goals as of 5 September 2025

Vitaliy Ruslanovych Kholod (Ukrainian: Віталій Русланович Холод; born 15 January 2004) is a Ukrainian professional footballer who plays as a centre-back for Karpaty Lviv.

== Club career ==
=== Early years ===
Born in Lviv, Kholod began his career in the youth sportive school #4 from his native city, where his first coaches were Andriy Chornyi and Vitaliy Ponomaryov. Then he continued in the Karpaty Lviv and the Rukh Lviv academies.

=== Rukh Lviv ===
In September 2020 he signed a contract with the Ukrainian Premier League side Rukh Lviv. He made his debut in the Ukrainian Premier League on 7 December 2022 as a second half-time substituted player in a home match against Chornomorets Odesa.
