= Oleksandr Kemkin =

Ukrainian footballer

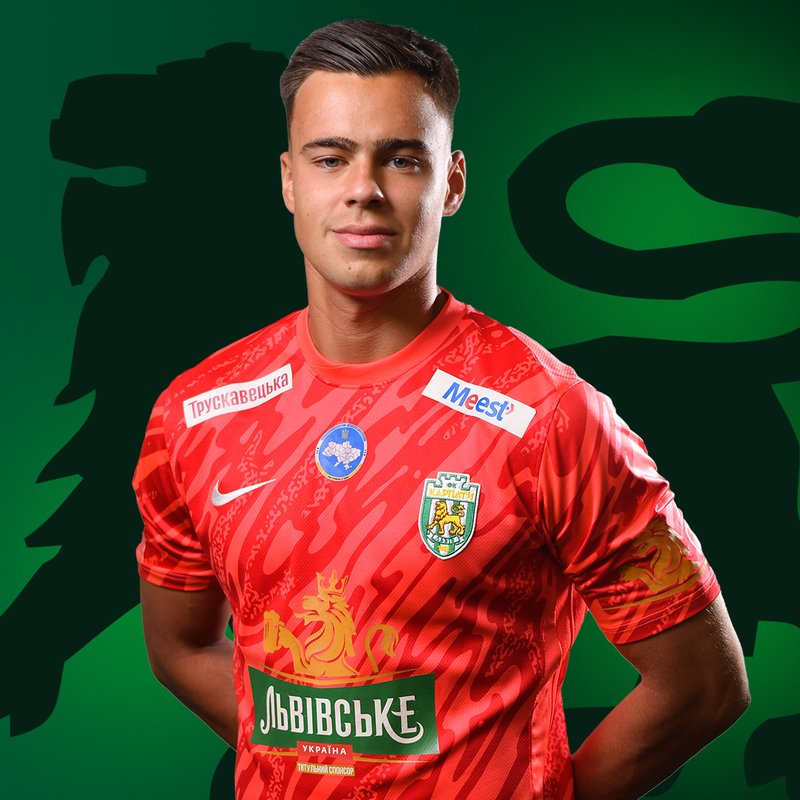

Personal information
- Full name: Oleksandr Olehovych Kemkin
- Date of birth: 5 August 2002 (age 24)
- Place of birth: Melitopol, Ukraine
- Height: 1.87 m (6 ft 2 in)
- Position: Goalkeeper

Team information
- Current team: Kryvbas Kryvyi Rih
- Number: 12

Youth career
- 2015–2019: Metalurh Zaporizhzhia
- 2019: Shakhtar Donetsk

Senior career*
Years	Team	Apps	(Gls)
2019–2021	Shakhtar Donetsk	0	(0)
2021–2024	Mynai	16	(0)
2024–	Karpaty Lviv	17	(0)
2025–	→ Kryvbas Kryvyi Rih (loan)	24	(0)
- * Club domestic league appearances and goals as of 3 June 2026

Oleksandr Olehovych Kemkin (Ukrainian: Олександр Олегович Кемкін; born 5 August 2002) is a Ukrainian professional footballer who plays as a goalkeeper for Kryvbas Kryvyi Rih.

== Career ==
Born in Melitopol, Kemkin is a product of the neighbouring Metalurh Zaporizhzhia and also Shakhtar Donetsk youth sportive school systems and in July 2021 he signed a contract with Ukrainian side Mynai and played for its in the Ukrainian Premier League Reserves and Under 19 Championship.

Lately Kemkin was promoted to the senior squad of this team. He made his debut in the Ukrainian Premier League for Mynai as a second half-time last minutes substituted player on 12 September 2022, playing in a winning away match against Inhulets Petrove.
