= Nazar Domchak =

Ukrainian footballer (born 2007)

- Domchak with the Karpaty Lviv jersey in 2025

Personal information
- Full name: Nazar Tarasovych Domchak
- Date of birth: 6 April 2007 (age 19)
- Place of birth: Stryi, Ukraine
- Height: 1.90 m (6 ft 3 in)
- Position: Goalkeeper

Team information
- Current team: Slavia Prague
- Number: 29

Youth career
- Karpaty Lviv

Senior career*
Years	Team	Apps	(Gls)
2025–2026	Karpaty Lviv	27	(0)
2026–	Slavia Prague	2	(0)

International career^{‡}
2025–2026	Ukraine U19	10	(0)
2025–	Ukraine U21	4	(0)
- * Club domestic league appearances and goals as of 4 November 2026 ‡ National team caps and goals as of 4 November 2026

Nazar Tarasovych Domchak (Ukrainian: Домчак Назар Тарасович; born 6 April 2007) is a Ukrainian professional footballer who plays as a goalkeeper for Slavia Prague.

== Club career ==
Born in Stryi in the Lviv Oblast, Domchak is a youth product of Karpaty Lviv.

Domchak made his professional debut with Karpaty Lviv on 3 August 2025, in a 2–0 Ukrainian Premier League loss to FK Polissja Zhytomyr, where despite the two goals he already stopped his first penalty.

The young player soon emerged as one of the most promising keepers of the country most notably stopping 4 penalties in a row during the season.

In the summer 2026, as his performance earned him interest from the likes of Champions League teams Lille and Manchester United, he chose to sign for Slavia Prague in the Czech First League, with the perspective of fighting for a place in the starting eleven. The Czech champions reportedly paid 5 million euros for the transfer, making him the most expensive goalkeeper in the history of the Czech first tier.

He started the season as the backup for Jakub Markovič, only playing the Czech cup, but when Markovič injured himself in October 2026, Domchak started two games in the First League, before making his Champions league debut, as he played the full 90 minutes during a 2–1 home loss to English champions Arsenal.

== International career ==
Domchak is a youth international for Ukraine, having played for the under-19 and under-21.

== Style of play ==
A goalkeeper with good feet that first made headlines for stopping penalties, Domchak has been compared to Brazilian international Ederson, while his arrival at Slavia Prague drew parallels with Antonín Kinský.
