= Yaroslav Karabin =

Ukrainian footballer

Personal information
- Full name: Yaroslav Myronovych Karabin
- Date of birth: 19 November 2002 (age 23)
- Place of birth: Lviv, Ukraine
- Height: 1.82 m (6 ft 0 in)
- Position: Striker

Team information
- Current team: Karpaty Lviv
- Number: 19

Youth career
- 2011–2019: Karpaty Lviv

Senior career*
Years	Team	Apps	(Gls)
2019–2020	Karpaty Lviv	4	(0)
2020–2025	Rukh Lviv	74	(11)
2023	→ Rukh-2 Lviv	15	(2)
2025–	Karpaty Lviv	18	(0)

International career^{‡}
2017	Ukraine U16	2	(0)
- * Club domestic league appearances and goals as of 3 June 2026 ‡ National team caps and goals as of 14 May 2021

Yaroslav Myronovych Karabin (Ukrainian: Ярослав Миронович Карабін; born 19 November 2002) is a Ukrainian professional footballer who plays as a striker for Karpaty Lviv.

== Career ==
Born in Lviv, Karabin is a product of the FC Karpaty Lviv School Sportive System, where his first trainer was Yaroslav Kikot.

In October 2020 he signed contract with another team from Lviv – Rukh, and made his debut for FC Rukh as the second half-time substituted player in the home losing match against FC Desna Chernihiv on 8 March 2021 in the Ukrainian Premier League.
