= Marko Sapuha =

Ukrainian footballer

- Marko Sapuha with Karpaty Lviv in 2026

Personal information
- Full name: Marko Andriyovych Sapuha
- Date of birth: 29 May 2003 (age 23)
- Place of birth: Lviv, Ukraine
- Height: 1.94 m (6 ft 4 in)
- Position: Defensive midfielder

Team information
- Current team: Karpaty Lviv
- Number: 20

Youth career
- 2011–2020: UFK-Karpaty Lviv

Senior career*
Years	Team	Apps	(Gls)
2020–2025	Rukh Lviv	49	(1)
2026–	Karpaty Lviv	9	(0)

International career^{‡}
2022	Ukraine U19	3	(1)
2022–	Ukraine U21	2	(0)
- * Club domestic league appearances and goals as of 3 June 2026 ‡ National team caps and goals as of 3 April 2024

Marko Andriyovych Sapuha (Ukrainian: Марко Андрійович Сапуга; born 29 May 2003) is a Ukrainian professional footballer who plays as a defensive midfielder for Karpaty Lviv.

== Career ==
Born in Lviv, Sapuha is a product of the FC Karpaty Lviv youth system, where his first trainer was Oleh Rodin.

In September 2020, he transferred to Rukh Lviv and made his Ukrainian Premier League debut as a second-half substitute against SC Dnipro-1 on 9 May.

== Personal life ==
He is the son of former Ukrainian footballer and football coach Andriy Sapuha.
