= Paulo Vitor (footballer, born 1999) =

Brazilian footballer (born 1999)

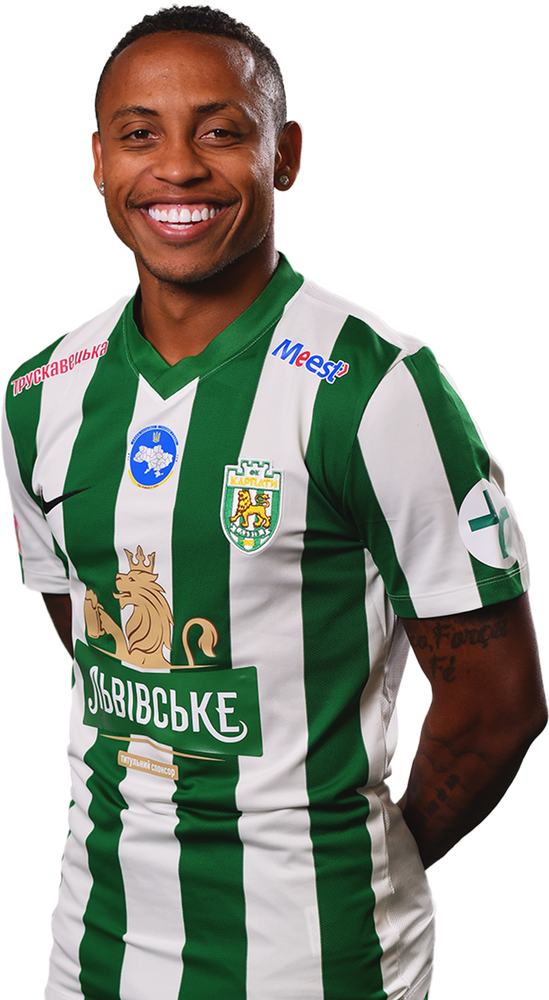

Personal information
- Full name: Paulo Vitor Fernandes Pereira
- Date of birth: 24 June 1999 (age 27)
- Place of birth: Rio de Janeiro, Brazil
- Height: 1.72 m (5 ft 8 in)
- Positions: Forward; left winger

Team information
- Current team: Dinamo Batumi
- Number: 11

Youth career
- 2007–2013: Vasco da Gama
- 2013–2014: Fluminense
- 2015–2017: Vasco da Gama

Senior career*
Years	Team	Apps	(Gls)
2017–2019	Vasco da Gama	31	(6)
2018–2019	→ Albacete (loan)	17	(7)
2019	→ Marbella (loan)	14	(4)
2019–2020	Marbella	25	(7)
2020–2023	Valladolid B	41	(17)
2022–2023	→ Rio Ave (loan)	29	(7)
2023–2024	Cruzeiro	9	(0)
2024	→ Novorizontino (loan)	22	(1)
2024–2026	Portimonense	25	(8)
2025–2026	→ Karpaty Lviv (loan)	24	(1)
2026–	Dinamo Batumi	0	(0)
- * Club domestic league appearances and goals as of 12 July 2026

Paulo Vitor Fernandes Pereira (born 24 June 1999), known as Paulo Vitor, is a Brazilian footballer who plays as a forward or left winger for Georgian club Dinamo Batumi.

== Club career ==
Born in Rio de Janeiro, Paulo Vitor graduated from Vasco da Gama's youth setup. He scored his first goal as professional on 12 July 2017, in the match against Vitória.

On 28 August 2018, Paulo Vitor joined Spanish Segunda División side Albacete Balompié on loan for one year, with a buyout clause. The following 30 January, after being rarely used, he moved to Marbella FC in Segunda División B on loan until June.

On 2 October 2020, Paulo Vitor moved to Real Valladolid and was assigned to the reserves in the third division. He renewed his contract until 2025 on 12 January 2022, and was loaned to Portuguese Primeira Liga side Rio Ave F.C. on 16 July, with a buyout clause.

On 24 July 2025, Paulo Vitor joined Karpaty Lviv in Ukraine on loan.

In July 2026, Vitor joined the Erovnuli Liga club Dinamo Batumi on a deal until December 2028.

== Personal life ==
Paulo Vitor's older brother Denílson is also a footballer and a forward.

== Career statistics ==
As of match played 2 May 2026

Appearances and goals by club, season and competition
Club	Season	League			State league		National cup (Note: Includes Copa do Brasil, Copa del Rey, Taça de Portugal)		League cup (Note: Includes Taça da Liga)		Continental		Other		Total	
Club	Season	Division	Apps	Goals	Apps	Goals	Apps	Goals	Apps	Goals	Apps	Goals	Apps	Goals	Apps	Goals
Vasco da Gama	2017	Série A	15	4	0	0	0	0	—		—				15	4
Vasco da Gama	2018	Série A	5	2	7 (Note: Appearance(s) in Campeonato Carioca)	0	0	0	—		4 (Note: Two appearances in Copa Libertadores, One appearance in Copa Sudamericana)	0	—		16	2
Vasco da Gama	Total		20	6	7	0	0	0	—		4	0	0	0	31	6
Albacete (loan)	2018-19	Segunda División	16	6	—		1	0	—		—		0	0	17	6
Marbella (loan)	2018-19	Segunda División B	14	4	—		0	0	—		—		—		14	4
Marbella	2019-20	Segunda División B	22	6	—		1	1	—		—		1 (Note: Appearance(s) in Segunda División B play-offs)	0	25	7
Valladolid B	2020-21	Segunda División B	19	8	—		—		—		—		—		19	8
Valladolid B	2021-22	Primera División RFEF	32	9	—		—		—		—		—		32	9
Valladolid B	Total		103	33	—		—		—		—		—		106	34
Rio Ave (loan)	2022-23	Primeira Liga	25	7	—		1	0	3	0	—		—		29	7
Cruzeiro	2023	Série A	9	0	0	0	0	0	—		—		—		9	0
Novorizontino (loan)	2024	Série B	16	1	6 (Note: Appearance(s) in Campeonato Paulista)	0	—		—		—		—		22	1
Portimonense	2024-25	Liga Portugal 2	25	8	—		0	0	0	0	—		—		25	8
Karpaty Lviv	2025—26	Ukrainian Premier League	24	1	2	1	—		—		—		—		26	2
Dinamo Batumi	2026	Erovnuli Liga	0	0	0	0	—		—		—		—		0	0
Career total			99	22	15	1	3	1	3	0	4	0	1	0	248	63
