= Bartativ =

Rural locality in Lviv Oblast, Ukraine

Bartativ Бартатів
- Village
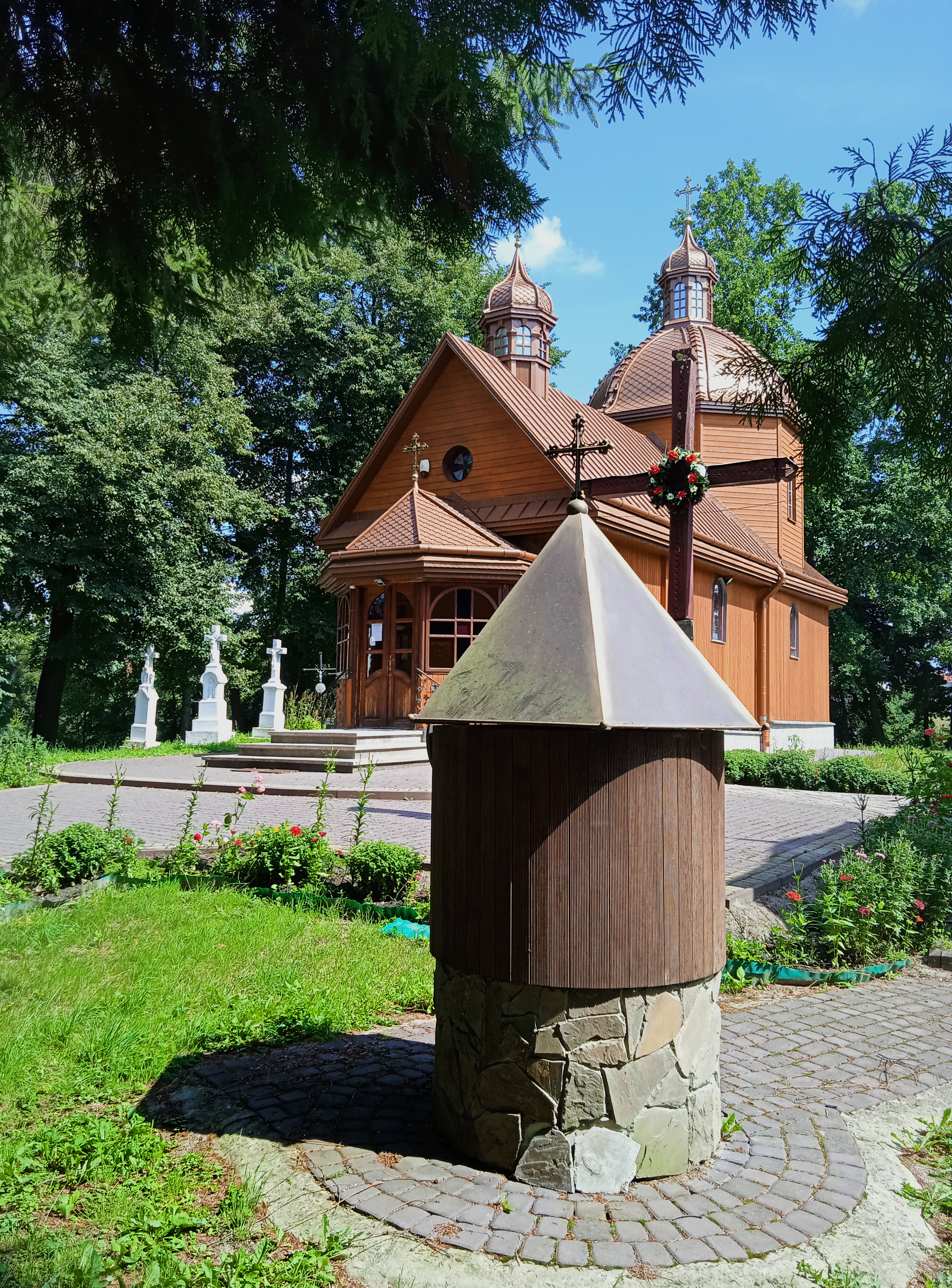
- Church of St. Basil.

- Location within Lviv Oblast Location within Ukraine
- Coordinates: 49°47′59″N 23°49′08″E
- Country: Ukraine
- Oblast: Lviv Oblast
- District: Lviv Raion
- Established: 1648

Area
  - Total: 1,656 km^{2} (639 sq mi)
- Elevation /(average value of): 284 m (932 ft)

Population
  - Total: 723
  - Density: 0.437/km^{2} (1.13/sq mi)
- Time zone: UTC+2 (EET)
  - Summer (DST): UTC+3 (EEST)
- Postal code: 81551
- Area code: +380 3231
- Website: с Бартатів, Городоцький район ^{(Ukrainian)}

Bartativ (Ukrainian: Барта́тів, Polish: Bartatów) is a village (selo) in Lviv Raion, Lviv Oblast (province) of Ukraine. It belongs to Horodok urban hromada, one of the hromadas of Ukraine. The village has an area of 16,56 km^{2} and population of the village is around 723 persons. Local government is administered by Bartativska village council.

== Geography ==
The village of Bartativ is located along the Highway in Ukraine M 11 connecting Lviv with Przemyśl. It is situated 17 kilometres (11 mi) from the regional center Lviv, 14 kilometres (8.7 mi) from Horodok and 75 kilometres (47 mi) from Przemyśl.

== History ==
The original name was Bartholdowa karczma (Barthold's Inn) (1433). In 1442, the owner, Barthold, donated the village to establish a town. Bartatów did not prosper and remained a village under the ownership of the Roman Catholic Archdiocese of Lviv.

The date of establishment of the village is considered 1648, but for the first time the village mentioned in historical documents in the early 15th century.

In the Second Polish Republic, the village was located in the Grodno County of the Lviv Voivodeship.

Between 1939 and 1944, Ukrainian nationalists from the OUN-UPA brutally murdered 55 Poles here as a part of considered as a genocide Massacres of Poles in Volhynia and Eastern Galicia.

Until 18 July 2020, Bartativ belonged to Horodok Raion. The raion was abolished in July 2020, as part of the administrative reform of Ukraine, which reduced the number of raions of Lviv Oblast to seven. The area of Horodok Raion was merged into Lviv Raion.

== Cult constructions and religion ==
An architectural monument of local importance of Horodok district is in the village of Bartativ:

- St. Basil's Ukrainian Greek-catholic church (wooden) 1826 (442-І/М)
- Wooden belfry 1826 (442-2/М)

== Gallery ==
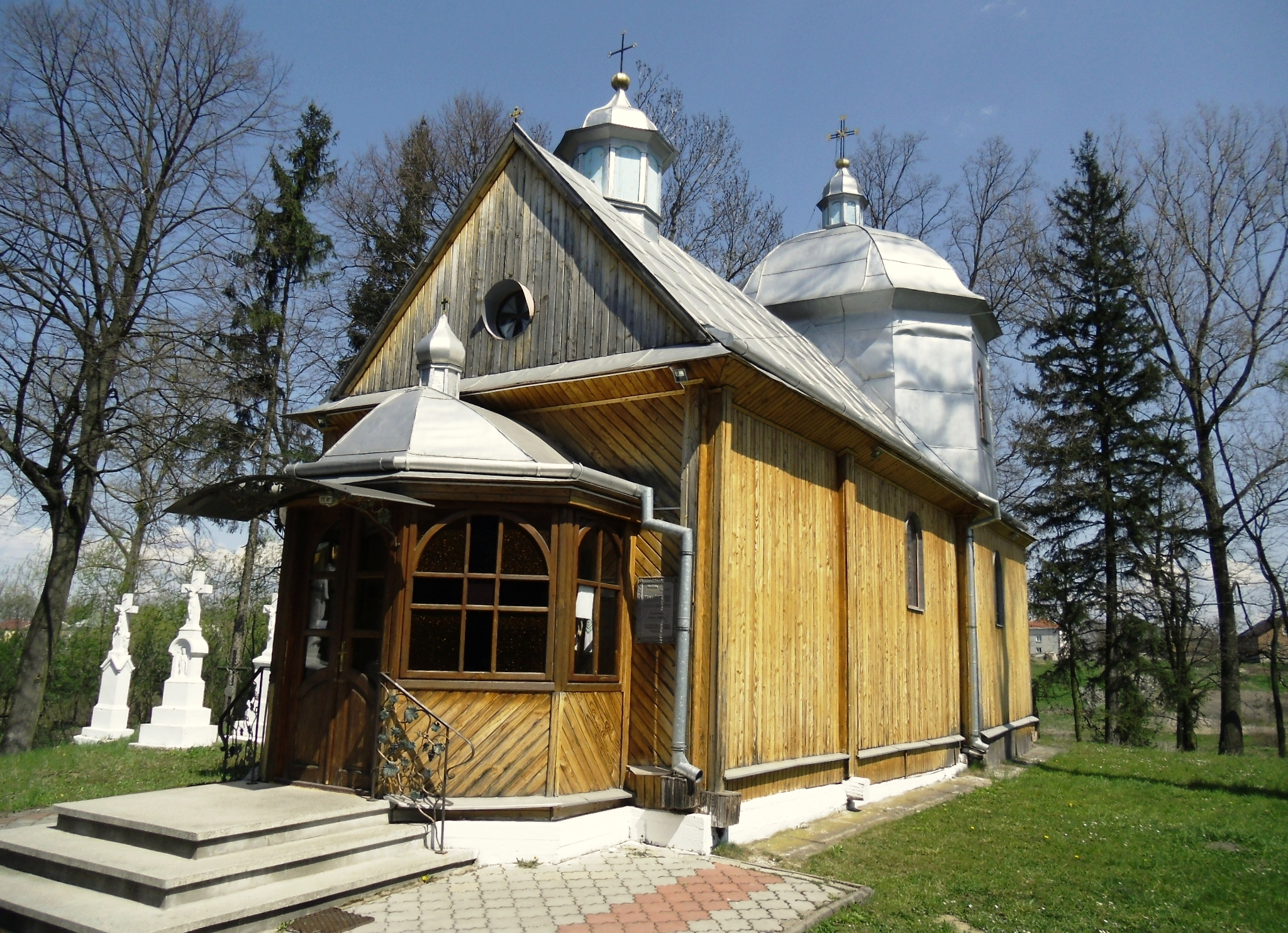
St. Basil's Ukrainian Greek-catholic church in the village Bartativ

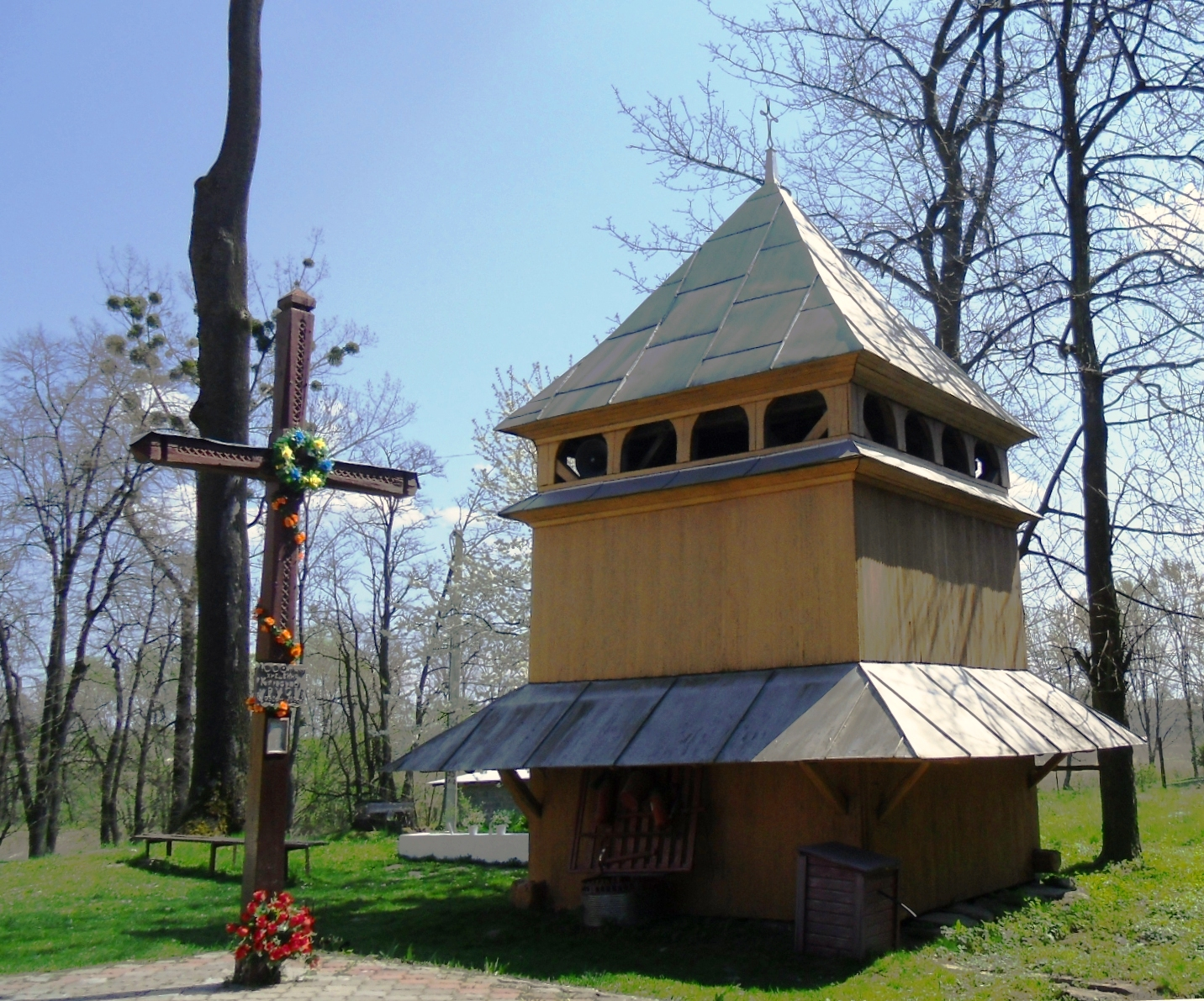
Wooden belfry of St. Basil's church in Bartativ

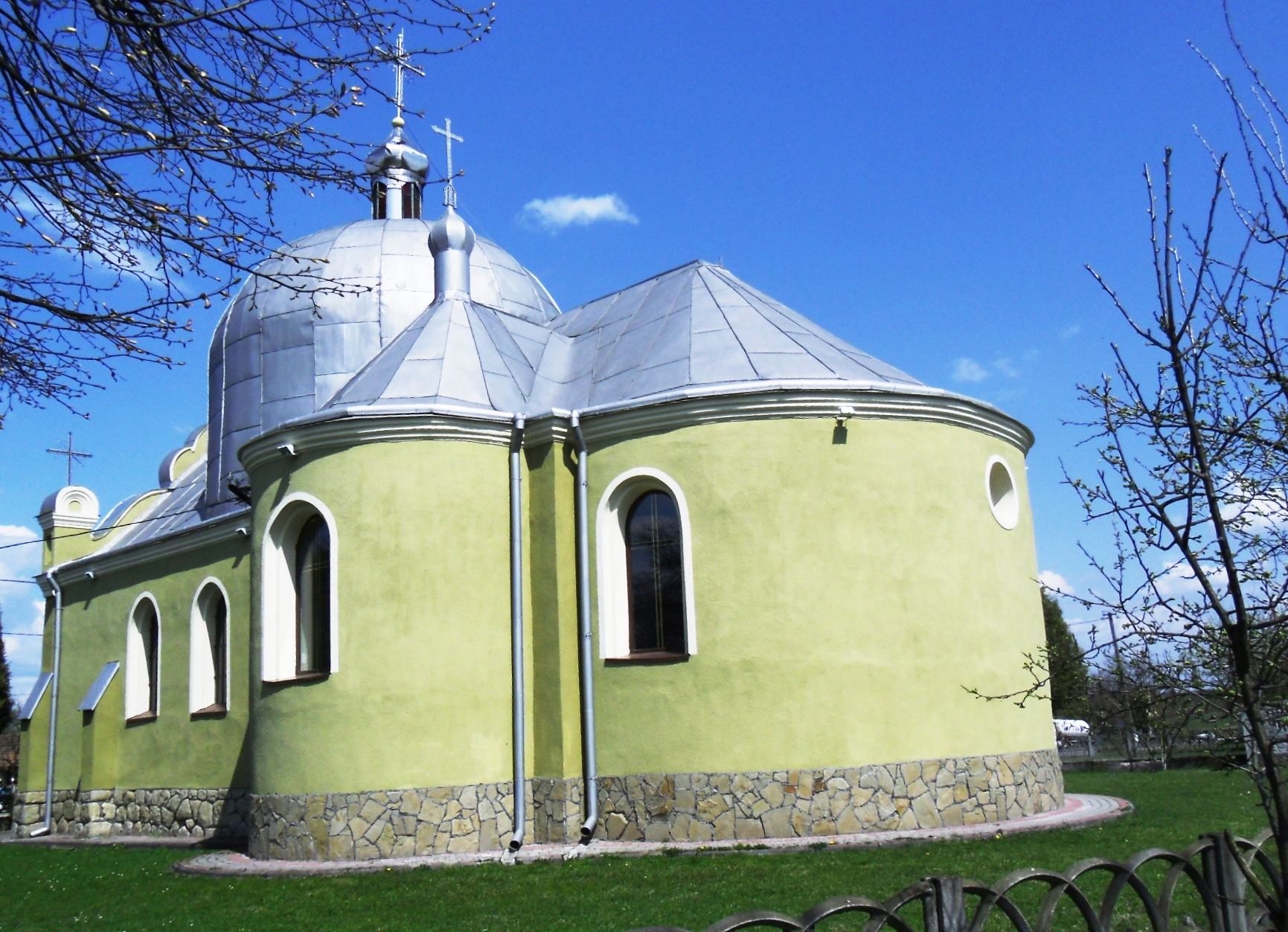
St.Basil church UAOC, Bartativ

== Literature ==
- Ukrainian: Історія міст і сіл УРСР : Львівська область. – К. : ГРУРЕ, 1968 р.) Page 257
