= Vladislav Baboglo =

Moldovan football player

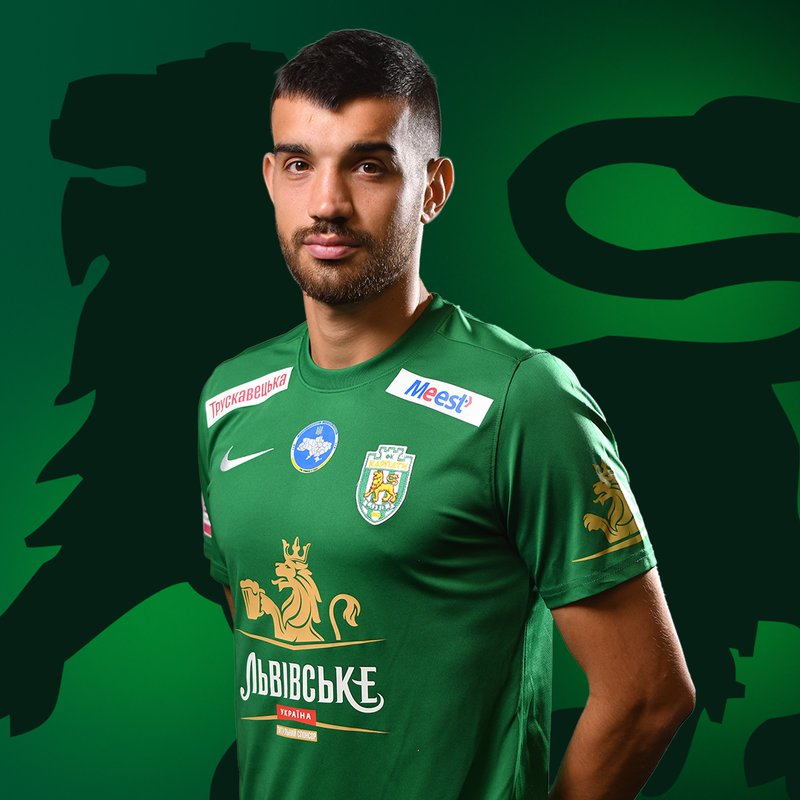
- Baboglo at Karpaty Lviv in 2024

Personal information
- Date of birth: 14 November 1998 (age 28)
- Place of birth: Copceac, Moldova
- Height: 1.87 m (6 ft 2 in)
- Position: Defender

Team information
- Current team: Karpaty Lviv
- Number: 4

Youth career
- 2011–2015: Chornomorets Odesa

Senior career*
Years	Team	Apps	(Gls)
2015–2017	Chornomorets Odesa	0	(0)
2017–2023	Oleksandriya	102	(6)
2023–	Karpaty Lviv	75	(10)

International career^{‡}
2013	Ukraine U17	3	(0)
2019–2020	Ukraine U21	7	(1)
2023–	Moldova	34	(3)
- * Club domestic league appearances and goals as of 3 June 2026 ‡ National team caps and goals as of 17 November 2026

Vladislav Baboglo (Ukrainian: Владислав Віталійович Бабогло; born 14 November 1998) is a Moldovan professional footballer who plays for Ukrainian Premier League club Karpaty Lviv. A former youth international for Ukraine, he plays for and captains the Moldova national team.

== Club career ==
Born in Gagauzia, Moldova, at 4 years of age Baboglo along with his parents moved to Odesa. At 5 he joined the Chornomorets sports school where among his first coaches was former Soviet and Ukrainian striker Viktor Sakhno.

He made his Ukrainian Premier League debut for FC Oleksandriya on 17 February 2018 in a game against FC Stal Kamianske.

== International career ==
In May 2013 Baboglo played for the Ukraine U17 team in a UEFA Development Tournament which took place in Minsk. He won the Valeriy Lobanovskyi Memorial Tournament in 2019 with the Ukraine U21 team and played in 2021 UEFA European Under-21 Championship qualification, scoring a goal against Northern Ireland.

In March 2023 Baboglo was called up to Moldova national football team, but he wasn't able to leave Ukraine. He made his debut for Moldova on 17 June 2023 in a 2–0 loss to Albania in UEFA Euro 2024 qualifying. Three days later he scored the winning goal in a 3–2 win over Poland.

== Career statistics ==
=== International ===
As of match played on 16 November 2026

Appearances and goals by national team and year
National team	Year	Apps	Goals
Moldova	2023	8	2
Moldova	2024	7	0
Moldova	2025	9	0
Moldova	2026	10	1
Total		34	3

Scores and results list Moldova's goal tally first, score column indicates score after each Baboglo goal.

List of international goals scored by Vladislav Baboglo
No.	Date	Venue	Opponent	Score	Result	Competition
1.	20 June 2023	Zimbru Stadium, Chișinău, Moldova	Poland	3–2	3–2	UEFA Euro 2024 qualifying
2.	17 November 2023	Zimbru Stadium, Chișinău, Moldova	Albania	1–1	1–1	UEFA Euro 2024 qualifying
3.	5 June 2026	Zimbru Stadium, Chișinău, Moldova	Bulgaria	2–2	2–2	Friendly
