= Jean Pedroso =

Brazilian footballer (born 2004)

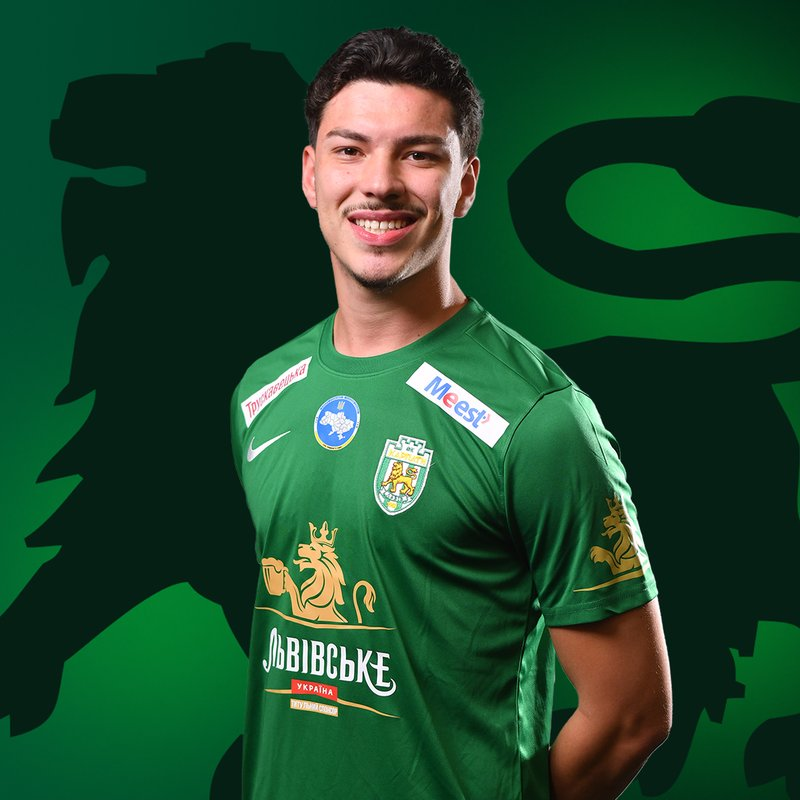

Personal information
- Full name: Jean Henrique Carneiro Pedroso
- Date of birth: 28 January 2004 (age 22)
- Place of birth: Carambeí, Brazil
- Height: 1.91 m (6 ft 3 in)
- Position: Centre back

Team information
- Current team: Karpaty Lviv
- Number: 47

Youth career
- 2015–2022: Coritiba

Senior career*
| Years | Team | Apps | (Gls) |
| 2023–2025 | Coritiba | 13 | (1) |
| 2024–2025 | → Karpaty Lviv (loan) | 20 | (1) |
| 2025– | Karpaty Lviv | 21 | (3) |

International career^{‡}
| 2023 | Brazil U20 | 14 | (2) |
- * Club domestic league appearances and goals as of 3 June 2026 ‡ National team caps and goals as of 18:49, 10 June 2023 (UTC)

Jean Henrique Carneiro Pedroso (born 28 January 2004), known as Jean Pedroso, is a Brazilian footballer who plays as a central defender for Ukrainian club Karpaty Lviv.

== Club career ==
Born in Carambeí, Paraná, Jean Pedroso joined Coritiba's youth setup in 2015, aged 11, after playing futsal for local teams. He was promoted to the first team for the 2023 season, after impressing with the under-20s.

On 16 March 2023, Jean Pedroso renewed his contract with Coxa until the end of 2026. He made his first team – and Série A – debut on 10 June, starting in a 0–0 home draw against Santos.

On 31 July 2024, Pedroso signed with Ukrainian Premier League club Karpaty Lviv on a one-year loan deal.

== International career ==
On 12 January 2023, Jean Pedroso was called up to the Brazil national under-20 team for the 2023 South American U-20 Championship. A starter as the team lifted the trophy, he was also included in Ramon Menezes' 21-man squad for the 2023 FIFA U-20 World Cup on 3 May, after Kaiky withdrew due to an injury.

== Personal life ==
Jean Pedroso is of the Ukrainian descent.

== Career statistics ==
As of 10 June 2023

| Club | Season | League | | | State League | | Cup | | Continental | | Other | | Total | |
| Club | Season | Division | Apps | Goals | Apps | Goals | Apps | Goals | Apps | Goals | Apps | Goals | Apps | Goals |
|---|---|---|---|---|---|---|---|---|---|---|---|---|---|---|
| Coritiba | 2023 | Série A | 1 | 0 | 0 | 0 | 0 | 0 | — | | — | | 1 | 0 |
| Career total | | | 1 | 0 | 0 | 0 | 0 | 0 | 0 | 0 | 0 | 0 | 1 | 0 |

== Honours ==
=== International ===
Brazil U20

- South American U-20 Championship: 2023
