= Edson Fernando =

Brazilian footballer

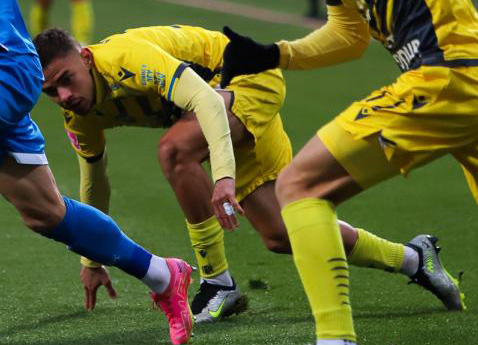
- Edson Fernando playing for Rukh Lviv in 2023

Personal information
- Full name: Edson Fernando da Silva Gomes
- Date of birth: 24 April 1998 (age 28)
- Place of birth: Natal, Brazil
- Height: 1.78 m (5 ft 10 in)
- Position: Defensive midfielder

Team information
- Current team: Remo (on loan from Karpaty Lviv)
- Number: 35

Youth career
- Alecrim
- 2017: → Vitória (loan)
- 2017–2018: → Votuporanguense (loan)

Senior career*
Years	Team	Apps	(Gls)
2015–2018	Alecrim	12	(0)
2019	Globo	12	(0)
2019–2022	Bahia	35	(0)
2022–2025	Rukh Lviv	35	(0)
2022	→ Atlético Goianiense (loan)	25	(0)
2024	→ Juárez (loan)	24	(2)
2026–	Karpaty Lviv	8	(0)
2026–	→ Remo (loan)	1	(0)
- * Club domestic league appearances and goals as of 3 June 2026

Edson Fernando da Silva Gomes (born 24 April 1998), commonly known as Edson Fernando, is a Brazilian footballer who plays as a defensive midfielder for Remo, on loan from Karpaty Lviv.

== Club career ==
Edson Fernando was born in Natal, Rio Grande do Norte, and was an Alecrim youth graduate. He made his first team debut on 19 April 2015, five days shy of his 18th birthday, by coming on as a half-time substitute in a 2–1 Campeonato Potiguar home win against Santa Cruz.

In March 2017, Edson Fernando moved to Vitória on loan, returning to the youth setup. He subsequently played for the under-20 squad of Votuporanguense before returning to his parent club for the 2018 season, where he featured sparingly in the year's Campeonato Potiguar.

Ahead of the 2019 campaign, Edson Fernando moved to Globo, being mainly utilized as a right back. In April of that year, he agreed to a one-year deal with Bahia, being initially assigned to the under-23 squad.

On 29 May 2020, after winning the 2020 Campeonato Baiano with the under-23 squad, Edson Fernando renewed his contract until December 2021, and was definitely promoted to the main squad. He made his Série A debut on 3 September, replacing Elton late into a 3–5 home loss against Flamengo.

== Career statistics ==
As of 25 October 2021

Club	Season	League			State League		Cup		Continental		Other		Total	
Club	Season	Division	Apps	Goals	Apps	Goals	Apps	Goals	Apps	Goals	Apps	Goals	Apps	Goals
Alecrim	2015	Potiguar	—		1	0	0	0	—		—		1	0
Alecrim	2016	Potiguar	—		0	0	—		—		—		0	0
Alecrim	2017	Potiguar	—		4	0	—		—		—		4	0
Alecrim	2018	Potiguar 2ª Divisão	—		7	0	—		—		—		7	0
Alecrim	Total		—		12	0	0	0	—		—		12	0
Globo	2019	Série C	0	0	12	0	—		—		—		12	0
Bahia	2019	Série A	0	0	—		0	0	—		—		0	0
Bahia	2020	Série A	12	0	10	0	0	0	2 (Note: Appearances in Copa Sudamericana)	0	0	0	24	0
Bahia	2021	Série A	7	0	0	0	3	0	0	0	5 (Note: Appearances in Copa do Nordeste)	0	15	0
Bahia	Total		19	0	10	0	3	0	2	0	5	0	39	0
Career total			19	0	34	0	3	0	2	0	5	0	63	0

== Honours ==
Bahia

- Campeonato Baiano: 2020
- Copa do Nordeste: 2021

Atlético Goianiense

- Campeonato Goiano: 2022
