= Stênio (footballer, born 2003) =

Brazilian footballer

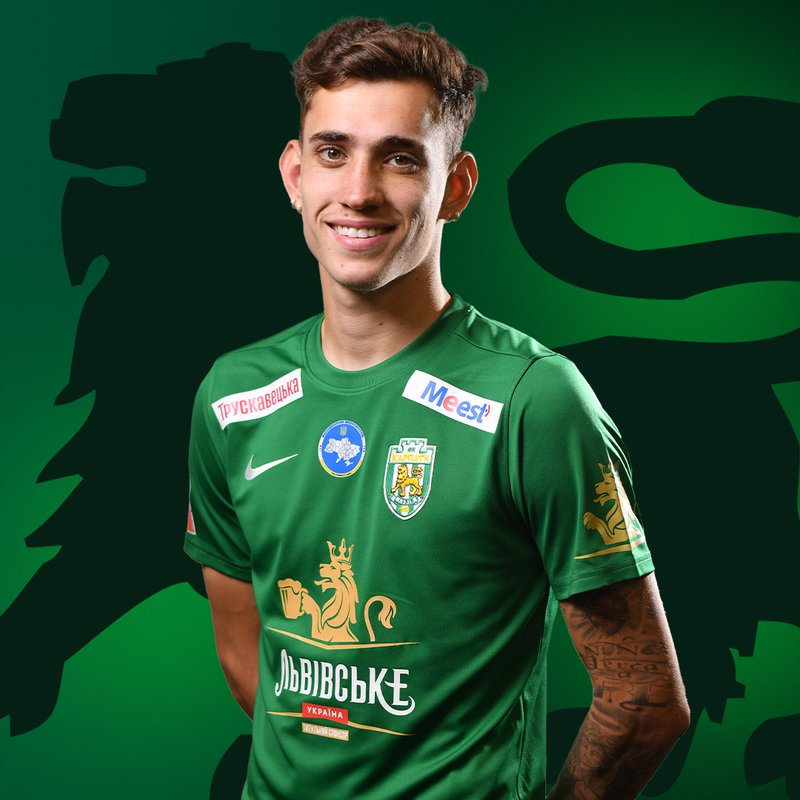

Personal information
- Full name: Stênio Zanetti Toledo
- Date of birth: 5 April 2003 (age 23)
- Place of birth: Poços de Caldas, Brazil
- Height: 1.80 m (5 ft 11 in)
- Position: Winger

Team information
- Current team: Modena
- Number: 33

Senior career*
Years	Team	Apps	(Gls)
2020–2024	Cruzeiro	38	(2)
2021–2022	→ Torino (loan)	0	(0)
2024	→ AVS (loan)	16	(1)
2024–2026	Karpaty Lviv	20	(0)
2025	→ América Mineiro (loan)	29	(1)
2026–	Modena	1	(0)

International career^{‡}
2019	Brazil U16	3	(0)
2023	Brazil U20	8	(1)
Medal record
Men's football
Representing Brazil
South American U-20 Championship
Winner	2023 Colombia
- * Club domestic league appearances and goals as of 22 August 2026 ‡ National team caps and goals as of 22:35, 21 January 2024 (UTC)

Stênio Zanetti Toledo (born 5 April 2003), commonly known as Stênio, is a Brazilian professional footballer who plays as a winger for Serie B club Modena.

== Career ==
On 19 January 2024, Campeonato Brasileiro Série A club Cruzeiro sent Stênio on a six-month loan to Liga Portugal 2 side AVS Futebol SAD.

== Career statistics ==
=== Club ===
As of 9 August 2020

Appearances and goals by club, season and competition
Club	Season	League			State league		Cup		Other		Total	
Club	Season	Division	Apps	Goals	Apps	Goals	Apps	Goals	Apps	Goals	Apps	Goals
Cruzeiro	2020	Série B	1	0	3 (Note: Appearances in Campeonato Mineiro)	0	0	0	0	0	4	0
Career total			1	0	3	0	0	0	0	0	4	0
