= Yan Kostenko =

Ukrainian footballer

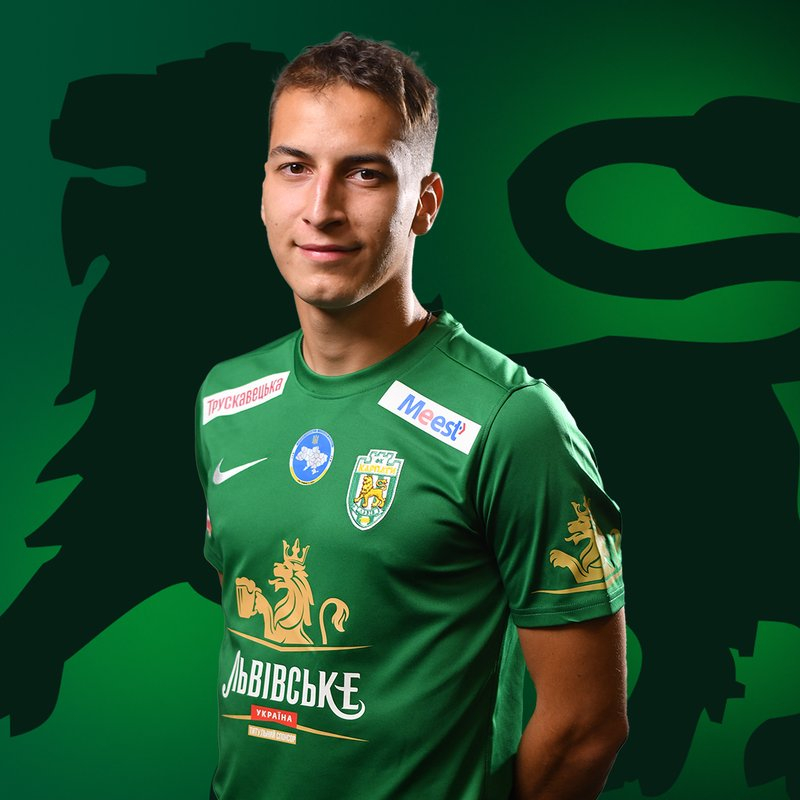

Personal information
- Full name: Yan Volodymyrovych Kostenko
- Date of birth: 4 July 2003 (age 23)
- Place of birth: Poltava, Ukraine
- Height: 1.84 m (6 ft 0 in)
- Position: Midfielder

Team information
- Current team: Karpaty Lviv
- Number: 26

Youth career
- 2011–2020: Vorskla Poltava

Senior career*
| Years | Team | Apps | (Gls) |
| 2020–2021 | Vorskla Poltava | 2 | (0) |
| 2021–2023 | Poltava | 35 | (7) |
| 2023– | Karpaty Lviv | 76 | (12) |
- * Club domestic league appearances and goals as of 3 June 2026

Yan Volodymyrovych Kostenko (Ukrainian: Ян Володимирович Костенко; born 4 July 2003) is a Ukrainian professional football midfielder who plays for club Karpaty Lviv in the Ukrainian Premier League.

== Career ==
Born in Poltava, Kostenko is a product of the local Vorskla Poltava youth sportive school system.

In February 2021 he was promoted to the Vorskla's main squad and made his debut as a second half-time substituted player for Vorskla Poltava in the Ukrainian Premier League in an away losing match against SC Dnipro-1 on 19 July 2020.
