= Baboucarr Faal =

Gambian footballer (born 2003)

Personal information
- Date of birth: 3 April 2003 (age 23)
- Place of birth: Banjul, Gambia
- Height: 1.87 m (6 ft 2 in)
- Position: Forward

Team information
- Current team: Viktoria Plzeň
- Number: 23

Youth career
- Hawks

Senior career*
Years	Team	Apps	(Gls)
–2023	Hawks		
2023–2025	Orijent	52	(11)
2025–2026	Rukh Lviv	27	(10)
2026	Karpaty Lviv	10	(2)
2026–	Viktoria Plzeň	4	(2)
- * Club domestic league appearances and goals as of 11 October 2026

Baboucarr Faal (born 3 April 2003) is a Gambian professional footballer who plays as a forward for Czech First League club Viktoria Plzeň.

== Career ==
=== Orijent ===
Faal joined First League club Orijent on 18 January 2023.

=== Rukh Lviv ===
Faal joined Rukh Lviv on 24 February 2025.

=== Viktoria Plzeň ===
On 29 May 2026, Faal signed a four-year contract with Czech First League club Viktoria Plzeň.
