= Fabiano (footballer, born 2006) =

Brazilian footballer

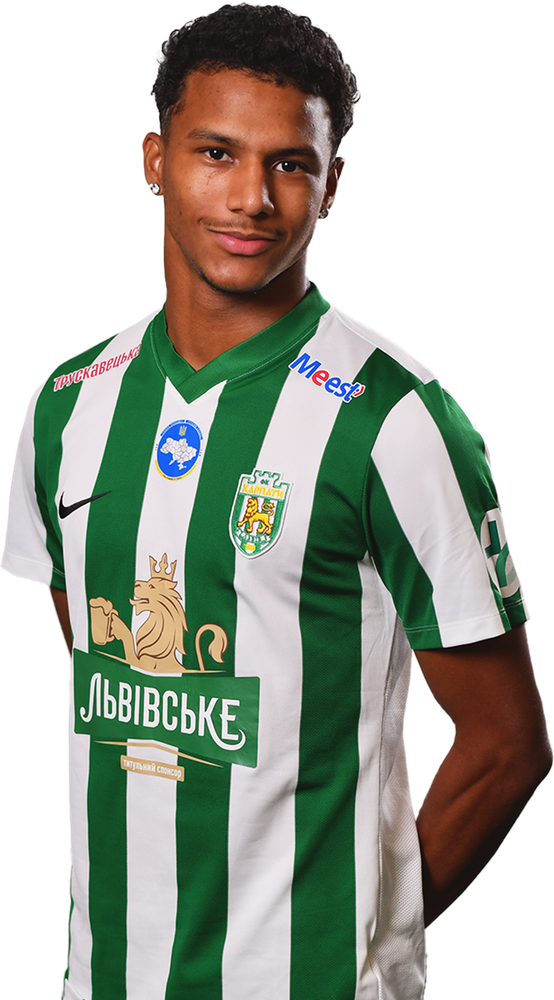

Personal information
- Full name: Fabiano Rodrigues Pereira
- Date of birth: 15 April 2006 (age 20)
- Place of birth: Brasília, Brazil
- Height: 1.81 m (5 ft 11 in)
- Position: Forward

Team information
- Current team: Karpaty Lviv
- Number: 9

Youth career
- Fluminense
- 2020–2024: Botafogo

Senior career*
Years	Team	Apps	(Gls)
2024	Botafogo	1	(0)
2025–	Karpaty Lviv	10	(1)
- * Club domestic league appearances and goals as of 20 December 2025

Fabiano Rodrigues Pereira (born 15 April 2006), simply known as Fabiano, is a Brazilian footballer who plays as a forward for Karpaty Lviv.

== Career ==
Born in Brasília, Federal District, Fabiano began his career with the under-13 squad of Fluminense, before moving to Botafogo in the under-15 category. On 6 September 2022, he signed his first professional contract with the latter after agreeing to a three-year deal.

Fabiano made his first team debut for Fogão on 22 May 2024, coming on as a second-half substitute for Jefferson Savarino in a 2–1 away win over Vitória, for the year's Copa do Brasil.

== Career statistics ==
As of 19 June 2024.

Club	Season	League			State League		Cup		Continental		Other		Total	
Club	Season	Division	Apps	Goals	Apps	Goals	Apps	Goals	Apps	Goals	Apps	Goals	Apps	Goals
Botafogo	2024	Série A	1	0	—		1	0	1 (Note: Appearance(s) in Copa Libertadores)	0	—		3	0
Career total			1	0	0	0	1	0	1	0	0	0	3	0

== Honours ==
Botafogo

- Copa Libertadores: 2024
- Campeonato Brasileiro Série A: 2024
