= Igor Neves =

Brazilian footballer

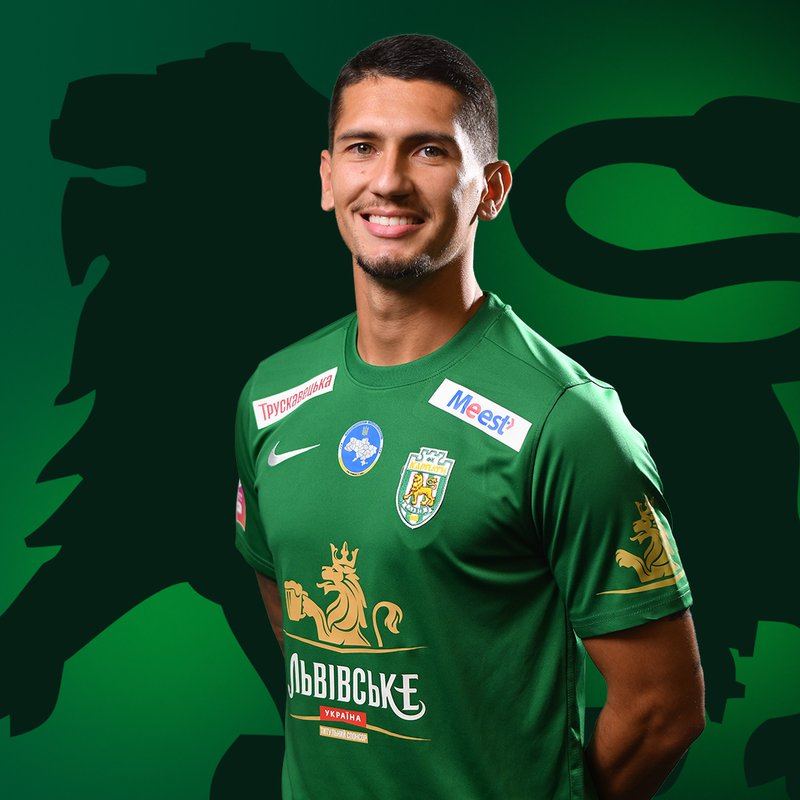

Personal information
- Full name: Igor Neves Alves
- Date of birth: 13 March 1999 (age 27)
- Place of birth: Paraná, Brazil
- Height: 1.77 m (5 ft 10 in)
- Position: Forward

Youth career
- –2016: Athletico Paranaense
- 2016–2017: Trieste
- 2017–2019: Criciúma

Senior career*
Years	Team	Apps	(Gls)
2019–2020	Atlético Reynosa	21	(14)
2020–2022	Cancún	28	(6)
2022	Real Estelí	17	(5)
2022–2023	Al Jazirah Al Hamra	20	(13)
2023–2026	Karpaty Lviv	71	(15)
2026-2026	→ Rukh Lviv (loan)	13	(2)
2026	Pattani FC		
- * Club domestic league appearances and goals as of 3 June 2026

Igor Neves Alves (born 13 March 1999) is a Brazilian professional footballer who plays as a forward.

== Career ==
A native of Paraná state, Brazil, Neves is a product of several Brazilian football academies including Athletico Paranaense, Trieste Futebol Clube, and Criciúma.

In 2019 he went abroad to Mexico joining Atlético Reynosa playing in the Mexican Serie A, but after a season left the club as it dissolved in 2020. Neves stayed in the country and signed with Cancun where he played couple of seasons, about a year. In 2021 Neves moved to Nicaragua and later to the United Arab Emirates.

In 2023 Neves signed with Ukrainian Karpaty Lviv playing in the second tier. During the 2023–24 season he was selected as a player of the Round and Ukrainian internet media SportArena made an interview with him about the current season and his adaptation in the club.
