= Rostyslav Lyakh =

Ukrainian footballer

Personal information
- Full name: Rostyslav Mykolayovych Lyakh
- Date of birth: 12 October 2000 (age 26)
- Place of birth: Mukachevo, Ukraine
- Height: 1.78 m (5 ft 10 in)
- Position: Midfielder

Team information
- Current team: Karpaty Lviv
- Number: 73

Youth career
- 201?–2013: Munkach Mukachevo
- 2013–2017: LDUFK Lviv
- 2017–2019: Karpaty Lviv

Senior career*
Years	Team	Apps	(Gls)
2019–2020	Karpaty Lviv	11	(0)
2020–2025	Rukh Lviv	82	(1)
2020	→ Karpaty Halych (loan)	6	(0)
2023	→ Rukh-2 Lviv	5	(0)
2026–	Karpaty Lviv	14	(0)

International career^{‡}
2018	Ukraine U18	3	(0)
2018	Ukraine U19	4	(1)
2022–2023	Ukraine U21	7	(0)
Medal record
Men's football
Representing Ukraine
UEFA European Under-21 Championship
Bronze medal – third place	2023 Georgia-Romania
- * Club domestic league appearances and goals as of 3 June 2026 ‡ National team caps and goals as of 6 July 2023

Rostyslav Mykolayovych Lyakh (Ukrainian: Ростислав Миколайович Лях; born 12 October 2000) is a Ukrainian professional footballer who plays as a midfielder for Karpaty Lviv.

== Career ==
Lyakh is a product of the FC Karpaty Lviv School Sportive System.

He made his debut for FC Karpaty as a substitute in the derby match against FC Lviv on 19 October 2019 in the Ukrainian Premier League.
