= 2020–21 FC Karpaty Lviv season =

Karpaty Lviv
2020–21 season
- President: Oleh Smaliychuk
- Manager: Lyubomyr Vovchuk
- Stadium: Ukraina Stadium, Lviv
- Second League: 13th
- Ukrainian Cup: Round 1 (1/64)
- Top goalscorer: League: Joseph Enete, Kostyantyn Bychek (3); All: Joseph Enete, Kostyantyn Bychek (3)
- Highest home attendance: 1,100 vs Rubikon; 3 October 2020
- Lowest home attendance: 0^{[a]} (9 matches)

After being expelled from Ukrainian Premier League Karpaty were admitted to Ukrainian Second League for the 2020–21 season. It was their 1st season on the 3rd tier of Ukrainian football.

== Players ==
=== Squad information ===
As of 11 June 2021

Squad no.	Name	Nationality	Position	Date of birth (age)
Goalkeepers
1	Valentyn Horokh	(Ukraine)	GK	14 February 2001 (age 25)
22	Nazar-Stefan Sass	(Ukraine)	GK	9 January 2002 (age 24)
39	Nazariy Stehnitskyi	(Ukraine)	GK	10 May 2002 (age 24)
Defenders
2	Roman Nazarchuk	(Ukraine)	DF	4 April 2003 (age 23)
4	Tymofiy Kalynchuk	(Ukraine)	DF	20 March 2001 (age 25)
5	Roman Danilovskyi	(Ukraine)	DF	21 May 2002 (age 24)
14	Oleh Bereza	(Ukraine)	DF	20 August 2001 (age 25)
21	Vladyslav Mudryk	(Ukraine)	DF	17 January 2001 (age 25)
28	Stepan Slichnyi	(Ukraine)	DF	11 January 2001 (age 25)
30	Roman Slyva	(Ukraine)	DF	23 September 2000 (age 26)
Midfielders
11	Denys Pidhurskyi	(Ukraine)	MF	27 May 2003 (age 23)
13	Vadym Hudzinskyi	(Ukraine)	MF	2 July 2001 (age 25)
18	Kostyantyn Bychek	(Ukraine)	MF	21 April 2000 (age 26)
31	Serhiy Sten	(Ukraine)	MF	26 February 2002 (age 24)
Forwards
7	Yuriy Radelytskyi	(Ukraine)	FW	5 April 2002 (age 24)
15	Nazar Sushchak	(Ukraine)	FW	23 January 2002 (age 24)
16	Roman Lisovyk	(Ukraine)	FW	26 December 2001 (age 24)
17	Maksym Ivanyuk	(Ukraine)	FW	9 March 2001 (age 25)
25	Lyubomyr Stepanchuk	(Ukraine)	FW	28 March 2000 (age 26)
32	Joseph Enete	(Nigeria)	FW	14 November 2000 (age 25)

== Transfers ==
=== In ===
Date	Pos.	Player	Age	Moving from	Type	Fee	Source
Summer

=== Out ===
Date	Pos.	Player	Age	Moving to	Type	Fee	Source
Summer
21 July 2020	DF	(Georgia (country)) Andro Giorgadze	24	(Georgia (country)) Torpedo Kutaisi	Transfer	Free	
21 July 2020	MF	(Ukraine) Oleksiy Khakhlyov	21	(Ukraine) FC Mynai	Transfer	Free	
27 July 2020	MF	(Ukraine) Dmytro Klyots	24	(Azerbaijan) Keşla	Transfer	Free	
31 July 2020	MF	(Ukraine) Hennadiy Pasich	27	(Ukraine) Veres Rivne	Transfer	Free	
31 July 2020	MF	(Ukraine) Volodymyr Tanchyk	28	(Ukraine) Metal Kharkiv	Transfer	Free	
9 August 2020	FW	(Moldova) Alexandru Boiciuc	22	(Romania) Academica Clinceni	Transfer	Free	
9 August 2020	MF	(Ukraine) Yuriy Tlumak	18	(Ukraine) Dynamo Kyiv	Transfer	Free	
20 August 2020	GK	(Ukraine) Volodymyr Makhankov	22	(Ukraine) Polissya Zhytomyr	Transfer	Free	
21 August 2020	FW	(Israel) Hisham Layous	19	(Ukraine) Rukh Lviv	Transfer	Free	
19 September 2020	FW	(Ukraine) Yaroslav Deda	21	(Ukraine) Karpaty Halych	Transfer	Free	
19 September 2020	MF	(Ukraine) Volodymyr Rudyuk	20	(Ukraine) Rukh Lviv	Transfer	Free	
25 September 2020	GK	(Ukraine) Yuriy-Volodymyr Hereta	16	(Ukraine) Rukh Lviv	Transfer	Free	
25 September 2020	MF	(Ukraine) Nazar Rusyak	16	(Ukraine) Rukh Lviv	Transfer	Free	
1 October 2020	DF	(Ukraine) Oleh Veremiyenko	21	(Ukraine) Rukh Lviv	Transfer	Free	
1 October 2020	MF	(Ukraine) Ostap Prytula	20	(Ukraine) Rukh Lviv	Transfer	Free	
5 October 2020	DF	(Ukraine) Bohdan Slyubyk	16	(Ukraine) Rukh Lviv	Transfer	Free	
6 October 2020	DF	(Ukraine) Vitaliy Roman	17	(Ukraine) Rukh Lviv	Transfer	Free	
6 October 2020	MF	(Ukraine) Vasyl Runich	20	(Ukraine) Rukh Lviv	Transfer	Free	
6 October 2020	FW	(Ukraine) Yaroslav Karabin	17	(Ukraine) Rukh Lviv	Transfer	Free	
6 October 2020	MF	(Ukraine) Oleksiy Sych	19	(Ukraine) Karpaty Halych	Transfer	Free	
6 October 2020	FW	(Ukraine) Rostyslav Lyakh	19	(Ukraine) Karpaty Halych	Transfer	Free	
6 October 2020	MF	(Ukraine) Andriy Remenyuk	21	(Ukraine) Kryvbas Kryvyi Rih	Transfer	Free	
6 October 2020	MF	(Ukraine) Oleksandr Avramenko	21	Unattached	Transfer	Free	
6 October 2020	MF	(Ukraine) Volodymyr Yakimets	22	(Ukraine) FC Lviv	Transfer	Free	
15 October 2020	DF	(Ukraine) Denys Slyusar	18	(Ukraine) Rukh Lviv	Transfer	Free	
15 October 2020	DF	(Ukraine) Petro Kharzhevskyi	20	(Ukraine) Rukh Lviv	Transfer	Free	
31 July 2020	GK	(Ukraine) Oleh Kudryk	23	(Ukraine) Shakhtar Donetsk	Loan return	Free	
Winter
4 January 2021	MF	(Ukraine) Orest Panchyshyn	20	(Ukraine) FC Mynai	Transfer	Free	
27 January 2021	MF	(Ukraine) Maksym Khlan	18	(Ukraine) Zorya Luhansk	Transfer	$70,000	
14 February 2021	DF	(Ukraine) Hlib Savchuk	17	(Ukraine) Rukh Lviv	Transfer	Free	
14 February 2021	FW	(Ukraine) Dmytro Shostak	17	(Ukraine) Rukh Lviv	Transfer	Free	

== Pre-season and friendlies ==
8 August 2020 Friendly	Karpaty Lviv	5 – 2	FC Lviv U-21	Briukhovychi
	Hudzinskyi 38'; Vereshchak 53'; Kozak 67', 73'; Karabin 76'	Report	Slyusar 58' (o.g.); Khimchak 90'	Stadium: NTB Karpaty

18 August 2020 Friendly	Karpaty Lviv	0 – 3	Nyva Ternopil	Lviv
12:00 EEST (UTC+03:00)		Report	Malashchuk 4'; Skakun 44'; Protsiv 52'	Stadium: Ukraina Stadium

26 November 2020 Friendly	Karpaty Lviv	0 – 2	Karpaty Halych	Lviv
12:00 EET (UTC+02:00)		Report	Deda 43'; Sedov 67'	Stadium: Ukraina Stadium; Referee: Oleksandr Shandor

20 February 2021 Ernest Yust Memorial. Group stage	Karpaty Lviv	6 – 0	Standart Artasiv	Vynnyky
12:00 EET (UTC+02:00)	Suschak 10'; Stepanchuk 25'; Radelytskyi 39'; Bychek 40', 77'; Enete 75'	Report		Stadium: Bohdan Markevych Stadium; Referee: Taras Putas

24 February 2021 Friendly	Prykarpattia Ivano-Frankivsk	2 – 0	Karpaty Lviv	Ivano-Frankivsk
13:00 EET (UTC+02:00)	Kokhman 24'; Barchuk 36'	Report		Stadium: Hat Trick Arena

27 February 2021 Ernest Yust Memorial. Group stage	Karpaty Lviv	4 – 0	FC Pustomyty	Vynnyky
12:00 EET (UTC+02:00)	Hudzinskyi 10'; Kalynchuk 59'; Suschak 74'; Enete 85'	Report		Stadium: Bohdan Markevych Stadium; Referee: Taras Putas

3 March 2021 Friendly	Karpaty Lviv	5 – 0	Shakhtar Novovolynsk	Lviv
12:00 EET (UTC+02:00)	Bychek 34'; Radelytskyi 56', 68', 76', 79'	Report		Stadium: UFK Stadium

6 March 2021 Ernest Yust Memorial. Group stage	Karpaty Lviv	1 – 2	Lviv Oblast XI	Vynnyky
12:00 EET (UTC+02:00)	Enete 37'	Report	Ivanyshyn 9'; Kurylyshyn 26'	Stadium: Bohdan Markevych Stadium; Referee: Taras Putas

11 March 2021 Friendly	Karpaty Lviv	1 – 1	FC Mykolaiv	Lviv
12:00 EET (UTC+02:00)	Bereza 11'	Report	? (?)	Stadium: Sokil Stadium

13 March 2021 Ernest Yust Memorial. Round of 32	Karpaty Lviv	5 – 1	Bosota Chornushovychi	Lviv
15:00 EET (UTC+02:00)	Enete 39', 49'; Bereza 69', 85' (pen.); Radelytskyi 74'	Report	Permyakov 41' (pen.)	Stadium: UFK Stadium; Referee: Yuriy Kovalchuk

21 March 2021 Ernest Yust Memorial. Round of 16	Karpaty Lviv U-17	0 – 3	Skala 1911 Stryi	Lviv
14:00 EET (UTC+02:00)		Report	Cherepuschak 7', 9', 40'	Stadium: UFK Stadium; Referee: Oleh Vaschyshyn

== Competitions ==
=== Overall ===
Competition	Record							
Competition	Pld	W	D	L	GF	GA	GD	Win %
Second League	24	3	4	17	20	55	−35	12.50
Cup	1	0	0	1	0	4	−4	0.00
Total	25	3	4	18	20	59	−39	12.00

Last updated: 11 June 2021
Source: Competitions

=== Second League. Group A ===
==== League table ====
Pos	Team	Pld	W	D	L	GF	GA	GD	Pts	Promotion, qualification or relegation
1	Podillya Khmelnytskyi (P, C)	24	17	6	1	46	13	+33	57	Promotion to Ukrainian First League
2	FC Uzhhorod (P)	24	17	4	3	50	23	+27	55	Promotion to Ukrainian First League
3	Dinaz Vyshhorod	24	15	6	3	52	19	+33	51	
4	Epitsentr Dunaivtsi	24	14	6	4	36	15	+21	48	
5	Karpaty Halych	24	14	4	6	42	25	+17	46	
6	Nyva Vinnytsia	24	10	3	11	38	38	0	33	
7	Bukovyna Chernivtsi	24	9	5	10	27	31	−4	32	
8	Chaika Petropavlivska Borshchahivka	24	6	7	11	26	32	−6	25	
9	Obolon-2 Bucha	24	6	6	12	21	39	−18	24	Promotion restrictions
10	FC Chernihiv	24	5	6	13	19	33	−14	21	
11	Rubikon Kyiv	24	4	5	15	17	44	−27	17	
12	Volyn-2 Lutsk	24	3	4	17	16	43	−27	13 (Note: Head-to-head points: Volyn-2 4, Karpaty 1)	Promotion restrictions
13	Karpaty Lviv	24	3	4	17	20	55	−35	13	
-	FC Kalush	0	-	-	-	-	-	—	0	Withdrew after Round 1 before their first game

Updated to match(es) played on 11 June 2021. Source: PFL.ua
Rules for classification: 1) Points; 2) Head-to-head points; 3) Head-to-head goal difference; 4) Head-to-head goals scored; 5) Goal difference in all games; 6) Goals scored in all games (Note: calculation by criteria indicated in rules 2, 3, 4 is conducted with consideration of all teams that have an equal number of tournament points at the moment of calculation and not only among those which after preliminary criteria have appeared more successful).
(C) Champions; (P) Promoted

==== Results summary ====
Overall								Home						Away					
Pld	W	D	L	GF	GA	GD	Pts	W	D	L	GF	GA	GD	W	D	L	GF	GA	GD
24	3	4	17	20	55	−35	13	1	2	9	10	32	−22	2	2	8	10	23	−13

Last updated: 11 June 2021.
Source: Competitive matches

==== Results by round ====
Round	1	2	3	4	5	6	7	8	9	10	11	12	13	14	15	16	17	18	19	20	21	22	23	24	25	26
Ground	H	A	H	A	H	A	H	H	A	H	H	H	A	A	H	A	H	A	H	A	A	H	A	A	A	H
Result	L	C	W	L	L	L	D	L	L	L	L	L	L	L	C	W	L	W	L	D	D	D	L	L	L	L
Position	13	13	7	11	12	12	11	12	12	12	13	13	13	13	13	13	13	13	13	13	13	12	12	12	12	13

Updated to match(es) played on 11 June 2021. Source: Competitive matches
A = Away; H = Home; W = Win; D = Draw; L = Loss; C = Cancelled

==== Matches ====
6 September 2020 1	Karpaty Lviv	0 – 3	Podillya Khmelnytskyi	Lviv
16:00 EEST (UTC+03:00)	Veremiyenko (yellow card) 25'	Report	Kostenko 19'; Zhdanov 25' (pen.); Prylyopa 32'; Shpikula (yellow card) 87'	Stadium: Ukraina Stadium; Attendance: 0^{[a]} Referee: Nazariy Dyord

12 September 2020 2	FC Kalush	cancelled^{[b]}	Karpaty Lviv	Kalush
EEST (UTC+03:00)				Stadium: Khimik Stadium

19 September 2020 3	Karpaty Lviv	4 – 1	FC Chernihiv	Lviv
15:00 EEST (UTC+03:00)	Lisovyk 1'; Pidhurskyi 16'; Enete 45+1'; Hudzinskyi 83'	Report	Lazarenko (yellow card) 32'; Mentei (yellow card) 65'; Kokhanovskyi (yellow card) 67'; Romanchenko 71'	Stadium: Ukraina Stadium; Attendance: 0^{[a]} Referee: Serhiy Podryhulya

27 September 2020 4	Karpaty Halych	3 – 1	Karpaty Lviv	Burshtyn
16:00 EEST (UTC+03:00)	Vereshchak (yellow card) 21'; Bey 28'; Zavalyak (yellow card) 43'; Kozak (yellow card) 57', (goal) 77'; Merdeyev 90+6'	Report	Enete 32'; Mudryk (yellow card) 34'; Runich (yellow card) 65'; Pidhurskyi (yellow card) 76' (yellow-red card) 79'	Stadium: Enerhetyk Stadium; Attendance: 200; Referee: Valeriy Kopmar

3 October 2020 5	Karpaty Lviv	1 – 2	Rubikon Kyiv	Lviv
14:00 EEST (UTC+03:00)	Slichnyi (yellow card) 8'; Mudryk (yellow card) 39' (yellow-red card) 65'; Shostak 71'; Karabin (yellow card) 78'	Report	Shvets (yellow card) 55'; Tyschenko 67' (pen.), 80'; Zarichnyuk (yellow card) 81'	Stadium: Ukraina Stadium; Attendance: 1,100; Referee: Vitaliy Malyar

11 October 2020 6	Epitsentr Dunaivtsi	2 – 0	Karpaty Lviv	Dunaivtsi
15:00 EEST (UTC+03:00)	Nychyporenko 2'; Ratsa (yellow card) 27', (goal) 50'	Report	Slichnyi (red card) 22'; Panchyshyn (yellow card) 44'	Stadium: Kolos Stadium; Attendance: 250; Referee: Roman Halitsyn

18 October 2020 7	Karpaty Lviv	1 – 1	Chaika Petropavlivska Borshchahivka	Lviv
14:00 EEST (UTC+03:00)	Panchyshyn 36' (pen.); Mudryk (yellow card) 50' (yellow-red card) 71'	Report	Bartoshuk (yellow card) 31'; Vechurko (yellow card) 52'; Tymenko 83' (pen.); Muzychenko (yellow card) 89'	Stadium: Ukraina Stadium; Attendance: 0^{[a]} Referee: Myroslav Lypko

23 October 2020 8	Karpaty Lviv	0 – 4	Volyn-2 Lutsk	Lviv
14:00 EEST (UTC+03:00)	Radelytskyi (yellow card) 21'; Slyva (yellow card) 90+3'	Report	Bohomaz 6' (pen.), 14' (pen.); Kuzmych (yellow card) 43'; Voytikhovskyi 52', 90+4'	Stadium: Ukraina Stadium; Attendance: 0^{[a]} Referee: Kateryna Usova

6 November 2020 10	Karpaty Lviv	0 – 3	Dinaz Vyshhorod	Lviv
14:00 EET (UTC+02:00)	Panchyshyn (yellow card) 62'; Savchuk (yellow card) 68'; Pidhurskyi (yellow card) 84' (yellow-red card) 86'	Report	Bovtruk 19', (yellow card) 57'; Banasevych (yellow card) 55'; Kirienko (yellow card) 58', (goal) 79'; Chepurnenko 69'	Stadium: Ukraina Stadium; Attendance: 0^{[a]} Referee: Serhiy Podryhulya

13 November 2020 11	Karpaty Lviv	0 – 3	Bukovyna Chernivtsi	Lviv
14:30 EET (UTC+02:00)	Panchyshyn (yellow card) 25'; Radelytskyi (yellow card) 33'	Report	Orlovskyi (yellow card) 24', (goal) 47'; Nahornyi (yellow card) 27'; Palahnyuk 34', 87'; A.Ryabyi (yellow card) 58'	Stadium: Ukraina Stadium; Attendance: 0^{[a]} Referee: Kristina Kozoroh

17 November 2020 9	Obolon-2 Kyiv	1 – 0	Karpaty Lviv	Bucha
14:00 EET (UTC+02:00)	Potopalskyi (yellow card) 70'; Kovalenko 72'; Tyurin (yellow card) 90+3'	Report	Sten (yellow card) 41'; Bereza (yellow card) 48'	Stadium: Yuvileynyi Stadium; Attendance: 0^{[a]} Referee: Rostyslav Dubyna

21 November 2020 12	Karpaty Lviv	0 – 5	FC Uzhhorod	Lviv
14:00 EET (UTC+02:00)	Stepanchuk (yellow card) 13'; Bereza (yellow card) 73'; Slichnyi (yellow card) 80'; Ivanyuk (yellow card) 90+2'	Report	Pukanych 1'; Fedak (yellow card) 56'; Chonka 60'; Ryashko 63'; Tyschuk 77'; Ferentsyk (yellow card) 79'; Betsa 81'; Kapustei (yellow card) 85'	Stadium: Ukraina Stadium; Attendance: 0^{[a]} Referee: Maksym Firsov

20 March 2021 13	Nyva Vinnytsia	4 – 2	Karpaty Lviv	Vinnytsia
14:00 EET (UTC+02:00)	Zahorulko 8', 70'; Kalitov 40'; Braslavskyi 87'; Zahrobskyi (yellow card) 90+1'	Report	Bereza 21'; Suschak 30'; Pidhurskyi (yellow card) 45+1'	Stadium: Nyva Stadium; Attendance: 0^{[a]} Referee: Nazariy Dyord

25 March 2021 14	Podillya Khmelnytskyi	4 – 1	Karpaty Lviv	Vynnyky
15:00 EET (UTC+02:00)	Kostenko 2'; Lipovuz 42'; Karpenko 45+1'; Prikhna (yellow card) 72'; Salback 79'; Kaverin (yellow card) 87'	Report	Slichnyi (yellow card) 16' (yellow-red card) 53'; Pidhurskyi (yellow card) 34'; Sten 90+1'	Stadium: NTB Rukh; Attendance: 0^{[a]} Referee: Maksym Firsov

3 April 2021 15	Karpaty Lviv	cancelled^{[b]}	FC Kalush	Lviv
EEST (UTC+03:00)				Stadium: Ukraina Stadium

10 April 2021 16	FC Chernihiv	0 – 1	Karpaty Lviv	Chernihiv
15:00 EEST (UTC+03:00)	Myronenko (yellow card) 9'; Serdyuk (yellow card) 43'; Koydan (yellow card) 45'; Zenchenko (yellow card) 87'	Report	Kalynchuk (yellow card) 28'; Slyva (yellow card) 78'; Mudryk 79'; Enete (yellow card) 86'; Radelytskyi (yellow card) 87'; Bereza (yellow card) 90+3'	Stadium: Chernihiv Arena; Attendance: 0^{[a]} Referee: Valeriy Kopmar

14 April 2021 17	Karpaty Lviv	1 – 3	Karpaty Halych	Lviv
12:00 EEST (UTC+03:00)	Mudryk (yellow card) 31'; Bychek 86'; Enete (yellow card) 90+2'	Report	Lebed 47', 57'; Poruchynskyi (yellow card) 81'; Khomchenko 90+2' (pen.)	Stadium: Sokil Stadium; Attendance: 0^{[a]} Referee: Kristina Kozoroh

19 April 2021 18	Rubikon Kyiv	0 – 3	Karpaty Lviv	Shchaslyve
13:00 EEST (UTC+03:00)	Novykov (yellow card) 21'; Kabanyuk (yellow card) 54'; Tyschenko (yellow card) 69'; Niankah (yellow card) 78'; Khodulya (yellow card) 83'; Zarichnyuk (yellow card) 85'	Report	Enete 4', (yellow card) 52'; Bychek 33'; Kalynchuk 88'; Nazarchuk (yellow card) 90+1'	Stadium: Arsenal Arena; Attendance: 0^{[a]} Referee: Taras Panasyuk

25 April 2021 19	Karpaty Lviv	0 – 3	Epitsentr Dunaivtsi	Lviv
13:00 EEST (UTC+03:00)	Danilovskyi (yellow card) 78'	Report	Ivashko 13' (pen.), 16'; Mudryk 29' (o.g.)	Stadium: Sokil Stadium; Attendance: 0^{[a]} Referee: Denys Fedan

30 April 2021 20	Chaika Petropavlivska Borshchahivka	1 – 1	Karpaty Lviv	Makariv
16:00 EEST (UTC+03:00)	Bartoshuk (yellow card) 53'; Pohranichnyi 60'; Mosiyuk (yellow card) 79'	Report	Bychek 36', (yellow card) 64'	Stadium: Brukvenko Central Stadium; Attendance: 50; Referee: Rostyslav Dubyna

8 May 2021 21	Volyn-2 Lutsk	1 – 1	Karpaty Lviv	Lutsk
16:00 EEST (UTC+03:00)	Chernov 26'; Kuznyechikov (yellow card) 33'; Sasovskyi (yellow card) 38'; Moroz (yellow card) 85'	Report	Suschak (yellow card) 47'; Stepanchuk (yellow card) 53'; Enete (yellow card) 55'; Pidhurskyi 83'	Stadium: Pidshypnyk Stadium; Attendance: 250; Referee: Pavlo Detsyuk

16 May 2021 22	Karpaty Lviv	2 – 2	Obolon-2 Kyiv	Lviv
13:00 EEST (UTC+03:00)	Radelytskyi 12'; Suschak (yellow card) 55'; Bychek (yellow card) 71'; Mudryk (yellow card) 74' (yellow-red card) 90+4'; Lisovyk 90+1'; Nazarchuk (yellow card) 90+4'	Report	Prokopenko 58'; Vasylenko (yellow card) 84'; Kovalenko 90+4'	Stadium: Ukraina Stadium; Attendance: 450; Referee: Maksym Firsov

22 May 2021 23	Dinaz Vyshhorod	3 – 0	Karpaty Lviv	Demydiv
16:00 EEST (UTC+03:00)	Ichanskyi (yellow card) 4', (goal) 33'; Starenkyi 23'; Petrenko (yellow card) 61'; Belych (yellow card) 68'; Apanchuk 84' (pen.); Pomazan (yellow card) 86'	Report	Danilovskyi (yellow card) 56'; Nazarchuk (yellow card) 78'	Stadium: Dinaz Stadium; Attendance: 100; Referee: Lyudmyla Telbukh

30 May 2021 24	Bukovyna Chernivtsi	1 – 0	Karpaty Lviv	Chernivtsi
16:00 EEST (UTC+03:00)	Enogela 37', (yellow card) 67'; Kalaytan (yellow card) 77'; Orlovskyi (yellow card) 85'; Ryabyi (yellow card) 88'	Report	Slyva (yellow card) 24'; Suschak (yellow card) 53'	Stadium: Bukovyna Stadium; Attendance: 1,000; Referee: Taras Panasyuk

4 June 2021 25	FC Uzhhorod	3 – 0	Karpaty Lviv	Uzhhorod
17:30 EEST (UTC+03:00)	Vyshnevskyi 34'; Mayboroda 44', 50'	Report		Stadium: Avanhard Stadium; Attendance: 250; Referee: Ivan Salash

11 June 2021 26	Karpaty Lviv	1 – 2	Nyva Vinnytsia	Lviv
17:30 EEST (UTC+03:00)	Nazarchuk (yellow card) 38'; Enete (yellow card) 48'; Radelytskyi 62'	Report	Braslavskyi (yellow card) 18'; Malyarenko 39'; Serbul (yellow card) 74'; Zelenevych 82'	Stadium: Ukraina Stadium; Attendance: 300; Referee: Myroslav Lypko

- ^{a} Match held without spectators due to dire epidemic situation.
- ^{b} Matches cancelled because FC Kalush decided to withdraw.

=== Ukrainian Cup ===
30 August 2020 Round 1 (1/64)	Epitsentr Dunaivtsi	4 – 0	Karpaty Lviv	Dunaivtsi
17:00 EEST (UTC+03:00)	Badlo 42'; Buy 67', 83', 88'	Report	Panchyshyn (red card) 44'	Stadium: Kolos Stadium; Referee: Ivan Salash

== Statistics ==
=== Appearances and goals ===
No.	Pos	Nat	Player	Total		Second League		Cup	
No.	Pos	Nat	Player	Apps	Goals	Apps	Goals	Apps	Goals
Goalkeepers
1	GK	(Ukraine) UKR	Valentyn Horokh	19	0	18	0	1	0
22	GK	(Ukraine) UKR	Nazar-Stefan Sass	7	0	6	0	0+1	0
Defenders
2	DF	(Ukraine) UKR	Roman Nazarchuk	8	0	2+5	0	0+1	0
4	DF	(Ukraine) UKR	Tymofiy Kalynchuk	25	1	24	1	1	0
5	DF	(Ukraine) UKR	Roman Danilovskyi	21	0	13+7	0	1	0
14	DF	(Ukraine) UKR	Oleh Bereza	21	1	20	1	1	0
21	DF	(Ukraine) UKR	Vladyslav Mudryk	20	1	16+3	1	1	0
28	DF	(Ukraine) UKR	Stepan Slichnyi	9	0	6+3	0	0	0
30	DF	(Ukraine) UKR	Roman Slyva	16	0	16	0	0	0
Midfielders
11	MF	(Ukraine) UKR	Denys Pidhurskyi	21	2	8+12	2	1	0
13	MF	(Ukraine) UKR	Vadym Hudzinskyi	25	1	24	1	1	0
18	MF	(Ukraine) UKR	Kostyantyn Bychek	11	3	11	3	0	0
31	MF	(Ukraine) UKR	Serhiy Sten	24	1	8+16	1	0	0
Forwards
7	FW	(Ukraine) UKR	Yuriy Radelytskyi	17	2	10+7	2	0	0
15	FW	(Ukraine) UKR	Nazar Suschak	17	1	14+3	1	0	0
16	FW	(Ukraine) UKR	Roman Lisovyk	21	2	14+7	2	0	0
17	FW	(Ukraine) UKR	Maksym Ivanyuk	5	0	0+4	0	1	0
25	FW	(Ukraine) UKR	Lyubomyr Stepanchuk	23	0	17+6	0	0	0
32	FW	(Nigeria) NGR	Joseph Enete	14	3	13+1	3	0	0
Players transferred out during the season
3	DF	(Ukraine) UKR	Oleh Veremiyenko	1	0	1	0	0	0
8	MF	(Ukraine) UKR	Orest Panchyshyn	10	1	9	1	1	0
10	MF	(Ukraine) UKR	Ostap Prytula	1	0	1	0	0	0
20	DF	(Ukraine) UKR	Vitaliy Roman	2	0	0+1	0	0+1	0
23	FW	(Ukraine) UKR	Yaroslav Karabin	4	0	4	0	0	0
24	DF	(Ukraine) UKR	Hlib Savchuk	9	0	4+4	0	1	0
26	FW	(Ukraine) UKR	Dmytro Shostak	9	1	0+8	1	1	0
27	DF	(Ukraine) UKR	Denys Slyusar	1	0	1	0	0	0
29	MF	(Ukraine) UKR	Vasyl Runich	4	0	4	0	0	0

Source: Competitions

Last updated: 11 June 2021

=== Goalscorers ===
Rank	No.	Pos	Nat	Name	Second League	Cup	Total
1	32	FW	(Nigeria)	Joseph Enete	3	0	3
	18	MF	(Ukraine)	Kostyantyn Bychek	3	0	3
3	11	MF	(Ukraine)	Denys Pidhurskyi	2	0	2
	16	FW	(Ukraine)	Roman Lisovyk	2	0	2
	7	FW	(Ukraine)	Yuriy Radelytskyi	2	0	2
6	13	MF	(Ukraine)	Vadym Hudzinskyi	1	0	1
	26	FW	(Ukraine)	Dmytro Shostak	1	0	1
	8	MF	(Ukraine)	Orest Panchyshyn	1	0	1
	14	DF	(Ukraine)	Oleh Bereza	1	0	1
	15	FW	(Ukraine)	Nazar Suschak	1	0	1
	31	MF	(Ukraine)	Serhiy Sten	1	0	1
	21	DF	(Ukraine)	Vladyslav Mudryk	1	0	1
	4	DF	(Ukraine)	Tymofiy Kalynchuk	1	0	1
				Total	20	0	20

Last updated: 11 June 2021

=== Clean sheets ===
Rank	No.	Pos	Nat	Name	Second League	Cup	Total
1	1	GK	(Ukraine)	Valentyn Horokh	2	0	2
				Total	2	0	2

Last updated: 20 April 2021

=== Disciplinary record ===
No.	Pos	Nat	Player	Second League			Cup			Total		
No.	Pos	Nat	Player	Yellow card	(yellow card) (yellow-red card)	Red card	Yellow card	(yellow card) (yellow-red card)	Red card	Yellow card	(yellow card) (yellow-red card)	Red card
2	DF	(Ukraine)	Roman Nazarchuk	4	0	0	0	0	0	4	0	0
3	DF	(Ukraine)	Oleh Veremiyenko	1	0	0	0	0	0	1	0	0
4	DF	(Ukraine)	Tymofiy Kalynchuk	1	0	0	0	0	0	1	0	0
5	DF	(Ukraine)	Roman Danilovskyi	2	0	0	0	0	0	2	0	0
7	FW	(Ukraine)	Yuriy Radelytskyi	3	0	0	0	0	0	3	0	0
8	MF	(Ukraine)	Orest Panchyshyn	3	0	0	0	0	1	3	0	1
11	MF	(Ukraine)	Denys Pidhurskyi	2	2	0	0	0	0	2	2	0
14	DF	(Ukraine)	Oleh Bereza	3	0	0	0	0	0	3	0	0
15	FW	(Ukraine)	Nazar Suschak	3	0	0	0	0	0	3	0	0
17	FW	(Ukraine)	Maksym Ivanyuk	1	0	0	0	0	0	1	0	0
18	FW	(Ukraine)	Kostyantyn Bychek	2	0	0	0	0	0	2	0	0
21	DF	(Ukraine)	Vladyslav Mudryk	2	3	0	0	0	0	2	3	0
23	FW	(Ukraine)	Yaroslav Karabin	1	0	0	0	0	0	1	0	0
24	DF	(Ukraine)	Hlib Savchuk	1	0	0	0	0	0	1	0	0
25	FW	(Ukraine)	Lyubomyr Stepanchuk	2	0	0	0	0	0	2	0	0
28	DF	(Ukraine)	Stepan Slichnyi	2	1	1	0	0	0	2	1	1
29	MF	(Ukraine)	Vasyl Runich	1	0	0	0	0	0	1	0	0
30	DF	(Ukraine)	Roman Slyva	3	0	0	0	0	0	3	0	0
31	MF	(Ukraine)	Serhiy Sten	1	0	0	0	0	0	1	0	0
32	FW	(Nigeria)	Joseph Enete	5	0	0	0	0	0	5	0	0
			Total	43	6	1	0	0	1	43	6	2

Last updated: 11 June 2021
