= 2024–25 FC Rukh Lviv season =

Rukh Lviv
2024–25 season
- Honorary president: Hryhoriy Kozlovskyi
- President: Yuliya Dumanska
- Head coach: Vitaliy Ponomaryov
- Stadium: Arena Lviv
- Ukrainian Premier League: 9th
- Ukrainian Cup: Quarter-finals
- Top goalscorer: League: Yaroslav Karabin; Ihor Krasnopir (6 each); All: Yaroslav Karabin; Ihor Krasnopir (6 each)

The 2024–25 season was the 22nd season in the history of FC Rukh Lviv, and the club's fifth consecutive season in Ukrainian Premier League. In addition to the domestic league, the team participated in the Ukrainian Cup.

== Players ==
=== First team squad ===
Squad at the end of season

Note: Flags indicate national team as defined under FIFA eligibility rules; some limited exceptions apply. Players may hold more than one non-FIFA nationality.

No.	Pos.	Nation	Player
1	GK	UKR	Yuriy-Volodymyr Hereta
4	DF	UKR	Vitaliy Kholod
6	MF	UKR	Yuriy Tlumak
7	MF	UKR	Yuriy Klymchuk
8	FW	UKR	Yaroslav Karabin
9	FW	UKR	Artur Remenyak
10	MF	UKR	Ostap Prytula
11	MF	UKR	Vasyl Runich
12	GK	UKR	Markiyan Bakus
15	MF	UKR	Denys Pidhurskyi
16	MF	UKR	Artur Ryabov
17	DF	UKR	Denys Slyusar
18	DF	UKR	Arsen Zalypka
19	FW	UKR	Yevheniy Pastukh (on loan from Karpaty Lviv)
20	FW	BRA	Klayver
22	DF	UGA	Ibrahim Juma
23	GK	UKR	Dmytro Ledviy
25	DF	UKR	Oleh Horin
29	DF	UKR	Roman Didyk

No.	Pos.	Nation	Player
34	MF	UKR	Danylo Slyva
35	MF	BRA	Edson Fernando
47	FW	UKR	Kostyantyn Kvas
50	MF	UKR	Ivan Denysov
59	DF	UKR	Erik Kalinets
62	GK	UKR	Svyatoslav Vanivskyi
63	MF	UKR	Marko Sapuha (captain)
73	DF	UKR	Rostyslav Lyakh
75	DF	UKR	Andriy Kitela
76	DF	UKR	Oleksiy Tovarnytskyi
77	FW	KGZ	Beknaz Almazbekov
78	MF	UKR	Mukhammad Dzhurabayev
82	DF	UKR	Nazariy Turko
87	MF	UKR	Nazar Rusyak
88	FW	UKR	Vladyslav Pohorilyi
92	DF	UKR	Bohdan Slyubyk
93	DF	UKR	Vitaliy Roman
99	FW	GAM	Baboucarr Faal

=== Left during the season ===
Note: Flags indicate national team as defined under FIFA eligibility rules; some limited exceptions apply. Players may hold more than one non-FIFA nationality.

No.	Pos.	Nation	Player
14	FW	UKR	Illya Kvasnytsya (loan to Karpaty Lviv)
22	FW	GLP	Ange-Freddy Plumain (to Nea Salamis)
67	DF	UKR	Milan Mykhalchuk (to Nyva Ternopil)
71	MF	UKR	Oleh Fedor (loan to Karpaty Lviv)

No.	Pos.	Nation	Player
77	DF	UKR	Oleksiy Sych (to Karpaty Lviv)
91	MF	UKR	Vladyslav Semotyuk (loan return to Kryvbas Kryvyi Rih)
95	FW	UKR	Ihor Krasnopir (to Karpaty Lviv)

== Transfers ==
=== In ===
Pos.	Player	Transferred from	Fee	Date	Source
MF	(Ukraine) Volodymyr Rudyuk	(Ukraine) Prykarpattia Ivano-Frankivsk	Loan return	30 June 2024	
DF	(Ukraine) Oleh Veremiyenko	(Ukraine) FC Podillya Khmelnytskyi	Loan return	30 June 2024	
DF	(Senegal) Djibril Diaw	(France) Stade Lavallois	Loan return	30 June 2024	
FW	(Ukraine) Ihor Krasnopir	(Ukraine) FC Obolon Kyiv		1 July 2024	

=== Out ===
Pos.	Player	Transferred to	Fee	Date	Source
MF	(Ukraine) Denys Teslyuk	(Ukraine) FC Obolon Kyiv		5 July 2024	

== Friendlies ==
=== Pre-season ===
29 June 2024 Friendly	Rukh Lviv (Ukraine)	4–0	(Ukraine) Veres Rivne
	Runich 5'; Krasnopir 26'; Talles 39' (pen.); Fedor 85'

3 July 2024 Friendly	Rukh Lviv (Ukraine)	2–2	(Hungary) Kecskemét
	Krasnopir 39'; Panchenko 110'		Pálinkás 44'; Katona 56'

6 July 2024 Friendly	Sturm Graz (Austria)	1–4	(Ukraine) Rukh Lviv	Gralla
18:00	Sarkaria 85' (pen.)		Pidhurskyi 4' (pen.); Krasnopir 35', 63'; Karabin 77'; Slyubyk (red card) 83'	Stadium: Sportplatz Gralla

9 July 2024 Friendly	Rukh Lviv (Ukraine)	1–3	(Croatia) Hajduk Split
	Prytula 62'		Šošić 35'; Durdov 66'; Skoko 72'

13 July 2024 Friendly	Rukh Lviv (Ukraine)	0–3	(Slovenia) Domžale
			Vanivskyi 16' (o.g.); Kolobarić 36', 40'

13 July 2024 Friendly	Osijek (Croatia)	3–1	(Ukraine) Rukh Lviv
	Miérez 5'; Pušić 39', 67'		Soldo 63' (o.g.)

16 July 2024 Friendly	Luton Town (England)	1–0	(Ukraine) Rukh Lviv	Rogla, Slovenia
	Morris 15'; Woodrow (penalty missed) 22'

17 July 2024 Friendly	Rukh Lviv (Ukraine)	1–2	(Azerbaijan) Sabah
17:30	Sekidika 2' (o.g.)		Parris 45+2'; Kupusović 90'

20 July 2024 Friendly	Hartberg (Austria)	0–2	(Ukraine) Rukh Lviv
16:00			Lyakh 24'; Prytula 51'

27 July 2024 Friendly	Rukh Lviv (Ukraine)	2–0	(Ukraine) Ahrobiznes Volochysk
13:00	Karabin 71' (pen.); Klayver 84'

== Competitions ==
=== Overall record ===
Competition	First match	Last match	Starting round	Record							
Competition	First match	Last match	Starting round	Pld	W	D	L	GF	GA	GD	Win %
Ukrainian Premier League	3 August 2024		Matchday 1	0	0	0	0	0	0	+0	—
Ukrainian Cup				0	0	0	0	0	0	+0	—
Total				0	0	0	0	0	0	+0	—

Source: Soccerway

=== Ukrainian Premier League ===
==== League table ====
Pos	Team	Pld	W	D	L	GF	GA	GD	Pts
6	Karpaty Lviv	30	13	7	10	42	36	+6	46
7	Zorya Luhansk	30	12	4	14	34	39	−5	40
8	Rukh Lviv	30	9	11	10	30	27	+3	38
9	Veres Rivne	30	9	9	12	33	44	−11	36 (Note: Head-to-head points: Veres Rivne 6, Kolos Kovalivka 0.)
10	Kolos Kovalivka	30	8	12	10	27	25	+2	36

Source: upl.ua
Rules for classification: 1) Points; 2) Head-to-head points; 3) Head-to-head goal difference; 4) Head-to-head goals scored; 5) Goal difference; 6) Goals scored; 7) Draw or "Golden match" if two teams tied for title (Article 22, paragraph 3).
Notes:

Teams that placed 13th and 14th in the 2024–25 Ukrainian Premier League played two-leg play-off with the third and fourth teams of the 2024–25 Ukrainian First League. As a result, both the Ukrainian First League teams (Metalist 1925 and Kudrivka) received promotion after beating the Ukrainian Premier League teams (Vorskla and Livyi Bereh), which in turn were relegated. Due to the Russian 2025 summer escalation and the Russian ballistic missile attack warnings, on 1 June 2025, both matches were suspended but later renewed.

Team 1	Agg.	Team 2	1st leg	2nd leg
Kudrivka	2–2 (4–3 p)	Vorskla Poltava	1–2	1–0
Livyi Bereh Kyiv	0–2	Metalist 1925 Kharkiv	0–1	0–1

=== First Semi-final ===
29 May 2025	Kudrivka	1–2	Vorskla Poltava	Kyiv
15:30	Kozak 83'	Report	Ndukve 23'; Pavlyuk 39'	Stadium: Obolon Arena; Attendance: 1,100; Referee: Dmytro Panchyshyn (Kharkiv)

1 June 2025	Vorskla Poltava	0–1 (3–4 p)	Kudrivka	Poltava
13:00		Report	Lytovchenko 9'	Stadium: Vorskla; Attendance: 2,204; Referee: Mykola Balakin (Kyiv oblast)
	Penalties
	Ndukve (penalty scored); Malysh (penalty scored); Iyede (penalty missed); Kane (penalty missed); Salabay (penalty scored); Sklyar (penalty missed)		(penalty scored) Tuzenko; (penalty missed) Storchous; (penalty scored) Shershen; (penalty scored) Potimkov; (penalty missed) Serdyuk; (penalty scored) Liehostayev

2–2 on aggregate; Kudrivka won 4–3 on penalties and promotion to Premier League. While, Vorskla lost 3–4 on penalties and relegation to First League

=== Second Semi-final ===
29 May 2025	Livyi Bereh Kyiv	0–1	Metalist 1925 Kharkiv	Hnidyn, Kyiv Oblast
18:00		Report	Moura 38'	Stadium: Arena Livyi Bereh; Attendance: 1,167; Referee: Viktor Kopiyevskyi (Kropyvnytskyi)

1 June 2025	Metalist 1925 Kharkiv	1–0	Livyi Bereh Kyiv	Hnidyn, Kyiv Oblast
15:30	Kalitvintsev 90'	Report		Stadium: Arena Livyi Bereh; Attendance: 1,800; Referee: Vitaliy Romanov (Dnipro)

Metalist 1925 Kharkiv won 2–0 on aggregate and promotion to Premier League. While, Livyi Bereh Kyiv lost 0–2 on aggregate and relegation to First League.

==== Results summary ====
Overall								Home						Away					
Pld	W	D	L	GF	GA	GD	Pts	W	D	L	GF	GA	GD	W	D	L	GF	GA	GD
0	0	0	0	0	0	0	0	0	0	0	0	0	0	0	0	0	0	0	0

==== Matches ====
The match schedule was released on 28 June 2024.

11 August 2024 2	Obolon Kyiv	0–4	Rukh Lviv	Kyiv
13:00 EET		Report	Prytula 19' (pen.); Sych (yellow card) 54'; Krasnopir 67'; Kvasnytsya 88'; Klayver 90'	Stadium: Obolon Arena; Attendance: 1,490; Referee: Ihor Paskhal

18 August 2024 3	LNZ Cherkasy	3–1	Rukh Lviv	Cherkasy
15:30 EET	Thill 73' (yellow card) 79'; Pasich 82'; Jashari 90+6'	Report	Roman (yellow card) 49'; Kvasnytsya 51'	Stadium: Cherkasy Arena; Attendance: 374; Referee: Denys Shurman

25 August 2024 4	Rukh Lviv	3–0	Zorya Luhansk	Lviv
15:30 EET (UTC+2)	Prytula (penalty missed) 14'; Karabin 16'; Pidhurskyi (yellow card) 19'; Kholod (yellow card) 44'; Runich 48'; Krasnopir 60'; Klayver (yellow card) 78' (yellow-red card) 90+1'	Report	Budkivskyi (yellow card) 66'	Stadium: Arena Lviv; Attendance: 1,150; Referee: Oleksiy Derevinskyi

30 August 2024 5	Rukh Lviv	5–0	Inhulets Petrove	Lviv
18:00 EET (UTC+2)	Karabin 14'; Didyk (yellow card) 35'; Kvasnytsya 47'; Krasnopir 51', 61'; Kholod 57'	Report	Melnychuk (yellow card) 18'	Stadium: Arena Lviv; Attendance: 950; Referee: Dmytro Panchyshyn

15 September 2024 6	Vorskla Poltava	0–0	Rukh Lviv	Poltava
13:00 EET	Sklyar (yellow card) 32' (yellow-red card) 38'; Chelyadin (yellow card) 64'; Kane (yellow card) 73'; Isenko (yellow card) 85'	Report	Kvasnytsya (yellow card) 45+2'; Sych (yellow card) 66'; Didyk (yellow card) 86'	Stadium: Oleksiy Butovsky Vorskla Stadium; Attendance: 1,100; Referee: Mykola Balakin

21 September 2024 7	Dynamo Kyiv	0–0	Rukh Lviv	Kyiv
18:00 EEST (UTC+3)		Report	Kholod (yellow card) 45'	Stadium: Valeriy Lobanovskyi Dynamo Stadium; Attendance: 1,789; Referee: Vitaliy Romanov

29 September 2024 8	Rukh Lviv	0–0	Kolos Kovalivka	Lviv
15:30 EET (UTC+2)	Didyk (yellow card) 54'; Fedor (yellow card) 73'	Report	Tsurikov (yellow card) 58'; Kryvoruchko (yellow card) 63'; Kozik (yellow card) 76'	Stadium: Arena Lviv; Attendance: 910; Referee: Ihor Paskhal

5 October 2024 9	Oleksandriya	1–1	Rukh Lviv	Oleksandriya
15:30 EET	Filippov 88' (yellow card) 88'; Campos (yellow card) 90+5'	Report	Kvasnytsya (yellow card) 77'; Roman (yellow card) 79'; Krasnopir 90+6' (pen.)	Stadium: CSC Nika Stadium; Attendance: 1,180; Referee: Dmytro Panchyshyn

21 October 2024 10	Rukh Lviv	0–1	Karpaty Lviv	Lviv
18:00 EEST (UTC+03:00)	Klymchuk (yellow card) 45+1'	Report	Pedroso 43'; Miroshnichenko (yellow card) 45+1'; Shakh (yellow card) 66'	Stadium: Arena Lviv; Attendance: 3,300; Referee: Oleksandr Afanasyev

25 October 2024 11	Rukh Lviv	1–1	Chornomorets Odesa	Lviv
15:30	Kvasnytsya 54'	Report	Yanakov 83'	Stadium: Arena Lviv; Attendance: 350; Referee: Klym Zabroda (Sumy)
Note: Protocol Vlog

4 November 2024 12	Kryvbas Kryvyi Rih	1–1	Rukh Lviv	Kryvyi Rih
15:30 EET	Zaderaka 47'; Tverdokhlib (yellow card) 82'	Report	Karabin 36'; Didyk (yellow card) 40'	Stadium: Hirnyk Stadium; Attendance: 327; Referee: Maksym Kozyryatskyi

10 November 2024 13	Veres Rivne	2–0	Rukh Lviv	Rivne
13:00 EET	Dakhnovskyi 6'; Iago Siqueira (yellow card) 12'; Luan Campos 22'	Report	Kvasnytsya (yellow card) 2'; Slyubyk (yellow card) 45'; Fedor (yellow card) 62'	Stadium: Avanhard Stadium; Attendance: 1,049; Referee: Oleksandr Omelchenko

24 November 2024 14	Rukh Lviv	1–0	Livyi Bereh Kyiv	Lviv
18:00	Karabin 45' (pen.); Didyk (yellow card) 45+2'; Slyubyk (yellow card) 46'; Roman (yellow card) 68'	Report	Semenov (yellow card) 58'; Dedukh (yellow card) 58'	Stadium: Arena Lviv; Attendance: 650; Referee: Denys Shurman
Note: Vlog

1 December 2024 15	Shakhtar Donetsk	1–1	Rukh Lviv	Lviv
18:00 EET (UTC+2)	Matviyenko 23'; Sudakov (yellow card) 45'	Report	Didyk (yellow card) 18' (goal) 90+2'; Krasnopir (yellow card) 30'; Slyubyk (yellow card) 45+1'	Stadium: Arena Lviv; Attendance: 1,280; Referee: Viktor Kopiyevskyi

4 December 2024 1	Rukh Lviv	1–1	Polissya Zhytomyr	Lviv
18:00 EET	Klymchuk (yellow card) 32'; Karabin 49'	Report	Krushynskyi (yellow card) 73'; Babenko (yellow card) 76'; Hutsulyak 82'; Matić (yellow card) 86'	Stadium: Arena Lviv; Attendance: 580; Referee: Mykola Balakin

9 December 2024 16	Polissya Zhytomyr	0–1	Rukh Lviv	Zhytomyr
18:00 EET	Wendell (red card); Volynets (yellow card) 64' (yellow-red card) 82'; Nazarenko (yellow card) 69'; Kushnirenko (yellow card) 90+6'	Report	Krasnopir 30' (yellow card) 33'; Kholod (yellow card) 63'; Klymchuk (yellow card) 79'; Didyk (yellow card) 90+6'	Stadium: Tsentralnyi Stadion; Attendance: 400; Referee: Ihor Paskhal

15 December 2024 17	Rukh Lviv	1–3	Obolon Kyiv	Lviv
15:30 EET (UTC+2)	Didyk 71'	Report	Bychek 9'; Taranukha 65'; Pryimak (yellow card) 65'; Bliznichenko 72'	Stadium: Arena Lviv; Attendance: 500; Referee: Oleksandr Kalyonov

22 February 2025 18	Rukh Lviv	0–1	LNZ Cherkasy	Lviv
18:00 EET (UTC+2)	Prytula (yellow card) 81'	Report	Tankovskyi 3'; Jashari (yellow card) 45'; Bessala (yellow card) 48'; Drambayev (yellow card) 62'	Stadium: Arena Lviv; Attendance: 500; Referee: Mykhaylo Rayda

2 March 2025 19	Zorya Luhansk	2–0	Rukh Lviv	Kyiv
15:30 EET	Yatsyk 3'; Budkivskyi 74'	Report	Horin (yellow card) 44'	Stadium: Valeriy Lobanovskyi Dynamo Stadium; Attendance: 250; Referee: Dmytro Panchyshyn

8 March 2025 20	Inhulets Petrove	0–1	Rukh Lviv	Lviv
15:30 EET (UTC+2)	Benedyuk (yellow card) 19'; Volokhatyi (yellow card) 79' (yellow-red card) 90+6'; Katrych (yellow card) 90+4'; Kyslenko (yellow card) 90+7'	Report	Klymchuk (yellow card) 79'; Prytula 90+7'	Stadium: Arena Lviv; Attendance: 405; Referee: Oleh Kohut

15 March 2025 21	Rukh Lviv	0–1	Vorskla Poltava	Lviv
18:00 EET (UTC+2)	Karabin (yellow card) 30'; Horin (yellow card) 51'; Ryabov (yellow card) 80'	Report	Kulach (yellow card) 56'; Malysh 82'	Stadium: Arena Lviv; Attendance: 350; Referee: Klym Zabroda

29 March 2025 22	Rukh Lviv	0–2	Dynamo Kyiv	Lviv
18:00 EET (UTC+2)	Pidhurskyi (yellow card) 53'	Report	Vanat 11'; Buyalskyi 30'; Kabayev (yellow card) 45'; Pikhalyonok (yellow card) 90+1'	Stadium: Arena Lviv; Attendance: 3,950; Referee: Maksym Kozyryatskyi

7 April 2025 23	Kolos Kovalivka	0–1	Rukh Lviv	Kovalivka
15:30 EET	Rrapaj (yellow card) 90+1'	Report	Karabin 27'	Stadium: Kolos Stadium; Attendance: 456; Referee: Dmytro Kubryak

12 April 2025 24	Rukh Lviv	1–1	Oleksandriya	Lviv
15:30 EET (UTC+2)	Edson Fernando (yellow card) 64'; Faal 66'	Report	Myshnyov 43'; Campos (yellow card) 49'; Shostak (yellow card) 83'; Martynyuk (yellow card) 85'	Stadium: Arena Lviv; Attendance: 900; Referee: Oleksandr Afanasyev

19 April 2025 25	Karpaty Lviv	3–1	Rukh Lviv	Lviv
13:00 EEST (UTC+03:00)	Bruninho 20'; Ocheretko (yellow card) 38'; Neves 45' (yellow card) 45+1'; Pidhurskyi 72' (o.g.); Klymenko (yellow card) 74'; Krasnopir (yellow card) 80'; Kinareykin (yellow card) 90+2'; Baboglo (yellow card) 90+5'	Report	Slyusar (yellow card) 23'; Lyakh (yellow card) 33' (yellow-red card) 90+5'; Ryabov (yellow card) 83'; Pastukh 89'; Runich (yellow card) 90+3'	Stadium: Ukraina Stadium; Attendance: 4,100; Referee: Maksym Kozyryatskyi

26 April 2025 26	Chornomorets Odesa	1–2	Rukh Lviv	Odesa
13:00 EET	Khoblenko 62'	Report	Klymchuk 20'; Ryabov 76'	Stadium: Chornomorets Stadium; Attendance: 0 Referee: Yevhen Tsybulko (Cherkasy)
Note: Protocol Vlog

2 May 2025 27	Rukh Lviv	0–0	Kryvbas Kryvyi Rih	Lviv
18:00 EET (UTC+2)	Kitela (yellow card) 39'; Ryabov (yellow card) 40'	Report	Romanchuk (yellow card) 24'	Stadium: Arena Lviv; Attendance: 850; Referee: Viktor Kopiyevskyi

=== Ukrainian Cup ===
29 October 2024 Round of 16	Rukh Lviv	1–0	Karpaty Lviv	Lviv
18:00 EET	Pidhurskyi 78'; Klymchuk (yellow card) 90+1'	Report	Adamyuk (yellow card) 16'; Miroshnichenko (yellow card) 50'; Álvarez (yellow card) 70'	Stadium: Arena Lviv; Attendance: 3,000; Referee: Vitaliy Romanov

2 April 2025 Quarter-finals	Rukh Lviv	0–1	Dynamo Kyiv	Lviv
18:00 EET	Slyusar (yellow card) 45'	Report	Pikhalyonok 43'; Rubchynskyi (yellow card) 84'	Stadium: Arena Lviv; Attendance: 1,350; Referee: Vitaliy Romanov
