= 2023–24 FC Obolon Kyiv season =

The 2023–24 season was the Obolon Kyiv's 33rd season in existence, and their 13th season since being re-established. It was their first season back in the Ukrainian Premier League since the 2011–12 season. In addition to the league, Obolon Kyiv also competed in the Ukrainian Cup.

== Squad ==
As of 1 March 2024 Note: Flags indicate national team as defined under FIFA eligibility rules; some limited exceptions apply. Players may hold more than one non-FIFA nationality.

No.	Pos.	Nation	Player
1	GK	(Ukraine) UKR	Nazariy Fedorivskyi
2	DF	(Ukraine) UKR	Danylo Karas
3	MF	(Ukraine) UKR	Vladyslav Pryimak
4	MF	(Ukraine) UKR	Taras Moroz
5	DF	(Ukraine) UKR	Oleksandr Osman
7	FW	(Ukraine) UKR	Oleh Vyshnevskyi
8	FW	(Ukraine) UKR	Rostyslav Taranukha
9	FW	(Ukraine) UKR	Ihor Medynskyi
10	MF	(Ukraine) UKR	Oleh Slobodyan (captain)
11	FW	(Ukraine) UKR	Maksym Hrysyo
13	GK	(Ukraine) UKR	Artem Kychak
14	DF	(Ukraine) UKR	Oleksandr Chernov
16	DF	(Ukraine) UKR	Pavlo Lukyanchuk
17	DF	(Ukraine) UKR	Ruslan Chernenko

No.	Pos.	Nation	Player
19	MF	(Ukraine) UKR	Serhiy Kosovskyi
21	FW	(Ukraine) UKR	Oleksandr Kozlov
23	GK	(Ukraine) UKR	Oleksandr Rybka
24	DF	(Ukraine) UKR	Yehor Prokopenko
25	MF	(Ukraine) UKR	Vitaliy Hrusha
31	GK	(Ukraine) UKR	Denys Marchenko
33	DF	(Azerbaijan) AZE	Dmitri Naghiyev
34	DF	(Ukraine) UKR	Artem Vovkun
37	DF	(Ukraine) UKR	Valeriy Dubko
50	MF	(Ukraine) UKR	Yevhen Zaporozhets
55	DF	(Ukraine) UKR	Serhiy Sukhanov
70	MF	(Ukraine) UKR	Kiril Korkh
90	FW	(Ukraine) UKR	Taras Lyakh
95	FW	(Ukraine) UKR	Ihor Krasnopir

== Competitions ==
=== Overview ===
Competition	First match	Last match	Starting round	Final position	Record							
Competition	First match	Last match	Starting round	Final position	Pld	W	D	L	GF	GA	GD	Win %
Ukrainian Premier League	29 July 2023	TBA	Matchday 1		0	0	0	0	0	0	0	0.00
Ukrainian Cup	TBA	TBA	TBA		0	0	0	0	0	0	0	0.00
Total					0	0	0	0	0	0	0	0.00

=== Ukrainian Premier League ===
Main Article: 2023–24 Ukrainian Premier League

==== League Table ====
Pos	Team	Pld	W	D	L	GF	GA	GD	Pts	Qualification or relegation
12	Chornomorets Odesa	30	10	2	18	38	47	−9	32 (Note: Zorya Luhansk finished ahead of Kolos Kovalivka and Chornomorets Odesa on head-to-head points: Zorya Luhansk 7, Kolos Kovalivka 6, Chornomorets Odesa 4)	
13	Veres Rivne (O)	30	6	10	14	31	46	−15	28	Qualification for the Relegation play-off
14	Obolon Kyiv (O)	30	5	11	14	18	41	−23	26	Qualification for the Relegation play-off
15	Mynai (R)	30	5	10	15	27	50	−23	25	Qualification for the mini tournament
16	Metalist 1925 Kharkiv (R)	30	5	8	17	32	57	−25	23	Qualification for the mini tournament

Source: upl.ua
Rules for classification: 1) Points; 2) Head-to-head points; 3) Head-to-head goal difference; 4) Head-to-head goals scored; 5) Goal difference; 6) Goals scored; 7) Draw or "Golden match" if two teams tied for title (Article 22, paragraph 3).
(O) Play-off winners; (R) Relegated

==== Results Summary ====
Overall								Home						Away					
Pld	W	D	L	GF	GA	GD	Pts	W	D	L	GF	GA	GD	W	D	L	GF	GA	GD
10	3	3	4	6	10	−4	12	1	3	1	3	4	−2	2	0	3	3	6	−3

==== Results ====
28 July 2023 1	Obolon Kyiv	0–0	Kolos Kovalivka	Kyiv
17:00 EEST (UTC+3)		Report		Stadium: Obolon Arena; Referee: Dmytro Bondarenko

4 August 2023 2	Obolon Kyiv	2–4	Dynamo Kyiv	Kyiv
17:00 EEST (UTC+3)	Chernenko 44'; Karas 51'	Report	Vanat 20'; Buyalskyi 45+6'; Yarmolenko 31' (pen.), 77' (pen.)	Stadium: Obolon Arena; Referee: Yurii Ivanov

12 August 2023 3	Chornomorets Odesa	2–0	Obolon Kyiv	Odesa
15:00 EEST (UTC+3)	Vasiliev 15' Iyede 62'	Report		Stadium: Chornomorets Stadium; Referee: Dmytro Panchyshyn

20 August 2023 4	Dnipro-1	1–2	Obolon Kyiv	Uzhhorod
15:00 EEST (UTC+3)	Pikhalonok 16' (o.g.)	Report	Taranukha 46' Krasnopir 83'	Stadium: Avanhard Stadium; Referee: Mykola Balakin

28 August 2023 5	Obolon Kyiv	0–0	Kryvbas Kryvyi Rih	Kyiv
19:00 EEST (UTC+3)		Report		Stadium: Obolon Arena; Referee: Kateryna Monzul

2 September 2023 6	Polissya Zhytomyr	2–0	Obolon Kyiv	Zhytomyr
15:00 EEST (UTC+3)	Hrytsuk 90+5' (o.g.) Kozak 90+9'	Report		Stadium: Tsentralnyi Stadion; Referee: Viktor Kopievskii

16 September 2023 7	Shakhtar Donetsk	1–0	Obolon Kyiv	Lviv
17:00 EEST (UTC+3)	Nazaryna 77'	Report		Stadium: Arena Lviv; Referee: Mykola Balakin

22 September 2023 8	Obolon Kyiv	0–0	Veres Rivne	Kyiv
17:00 EEST (UTC+3)		Report		Stadium: Obolon Arena; Referee: Dmytro Bondarenko

1 October 2023 9	Mynai	0–1	Obolon Kyiv	Mynai
13:00 EEST (UTC+3)		Report	Taranukha 78'	Stadium: Mynai Arena; Referee: Oleksandr Afanasiev

1 October 2023 10	Obolon Kyiv	1–0	Metalist 1925 Kharkiv	Kyiv
13:00 EEST (UTC+3)	Krasnopir 33'	Report		Stadium: Obolon Arena; Referee: Dmytro Kubriak
