= Mudryk =

Mudryk (Ukrainian: Мудрик) is a Ukrainian surname. Notable people with this surname include:

- Bryan Mudryk (born 1979), Canadian sportscaster
- Mykhailo Mudryk (born 2001), Ukrainian footballer
- Vladyslav Mudryk (born 2001), Ukrainian footballer

== See also ==
- Mudrik, a cognate surname
