= Oleh Slobodyan =

Ukrainian footballer

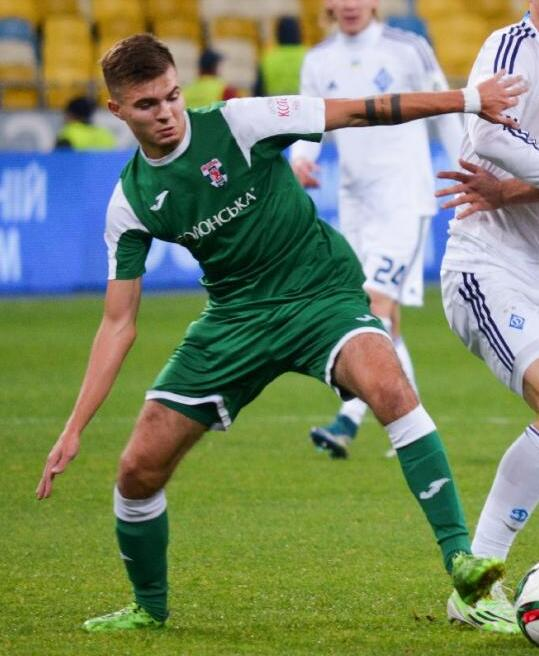
- Oleh Slobodyan in 2015

Personal information
- Full name: Oleh Oleksandrovych Slobodyan
- Date of birth: 3 October 1996 (age 30)
- Place of birth: Kyiv, Ukraine
- Height: 1.81 m (5 ft 11 in)
- Position: Attacking midfielder

Team information
- Current team: Obolon Kyiv
- Number: 10

Youth career
- 2006–2013: Zmina-Obolon Kyiv

Senior career*
Years	Team	Apps	(Gls)
2013–	Obolon Kyiv	240	(27)
2016	→ Obolon-2 Bucha	1	(0)
2021	→ Obolon-2 Bucha	1	(0)
- * Club domestic league appearances and goals as of 3 June 2026

Oleh Oleksandrovych Slobodyan (Ukrainian: Олег Олександрович Слободян; born 3 October 1996) is a Ukrainian professional footballer who plays as an attacking midfielder for Ukrainian club Obolon Kyiv.

== Personal life ==
He is the son of Oleksandr Slobodian, original CEO and current honorary president of beverages company Obolon and president of Obolon Kyiv. He was born in Troieshchyna, a large neighbourhood of Kyiv.
