= Ihor Krasnopir =

Ukrainian footballer (born 2002)

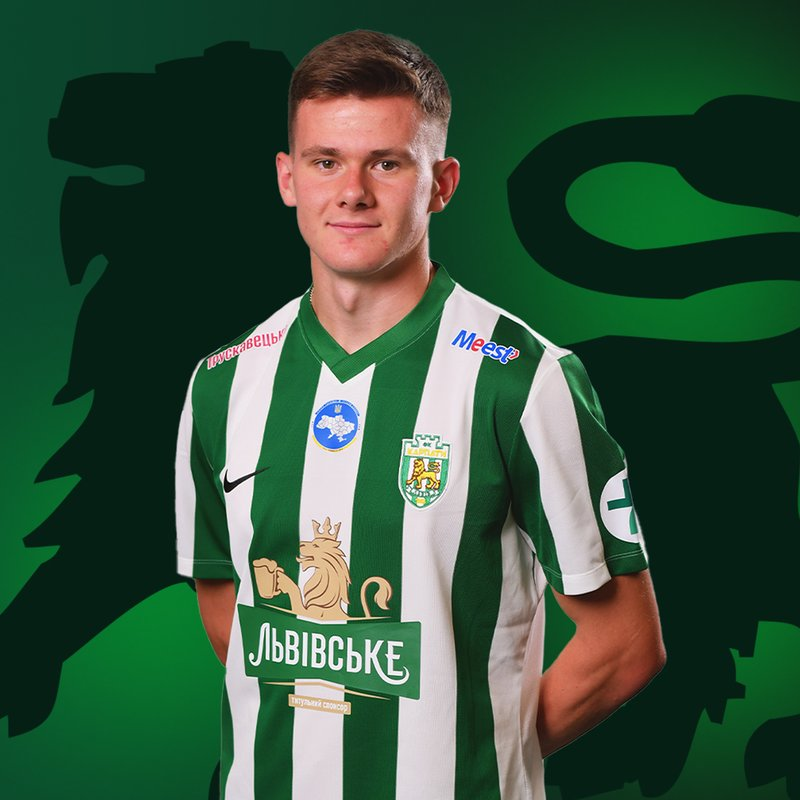

Personal information
- Full name: Ihor Vyacheslavovych Krasnopir
- Date of birth: 1 December 2002 (age 23)
- Place of birth: Kyiv, Ukraine
- Height: 1.87 m (6 ft 2 in)
- Position: Forward

Team information
- Current team: Polissya Zhytomyr
- Number: 95

Youth career
- 2016: DYuSSh-21 Kyiv
- 2016–2018: Monolit Kyiv
- 2018–2020: Arsenal Kyiv
- 2020–2021: Champion Kyiv

Senior career*
Years	Team	Apps	(Gls)
2021	Yunior Makariv		
2021	Kalynivka	4	(8)
2022–2024	Obolon Kyiv	48	(9)
2024–2025	Rukh Lviv	17	(6)
2025–2026	Karpaty Lviv	29	(5)
2026–	Polissya Zhytomyr	20	(7)

International career^{‡}
2022–2025	Ukraine U21	16	(3)
2024	Ukraine U23	8	(1)
2026–	Ukraine	4	(0)
- * Club domestic league appearances and goals as of 18 September 2026 ‡ National team caps and goals as of 18 November 2026

Ihor Vyacheslavovych Krasnopir (Ukrainian: Ігор В'ячеславович Краснопір [ˈiɦor wjɐtʃeˈslɑwowɪtʃ krɐsnoˈpir]; born 1 December 2002) is a Ukrainian professional footballer who plays as a forward for Polissya Zhytomyr and the Ukraine national team.

== Career ==
Born in Kyiv, Krasnopir is a product of a local academy school systems, before joined some amateurs clubs and subsequently transferring to the professional Obolon Kyiv in the Ukrainian First League in August 2022.

== International career ==
In November 2022, Krasnopir was called up for the first time to the Ukraine under-21 team as a reserve squad player, ahead of friendly matches vs Israel under-21 and Georgia under-21.

In May 2024, he was called up by Ruslan Rotan to the Ukraine Olympic football team squad to play at the 2024 Maurice Revello Tournament in France.

== Career statistics ==
=== Club ===
As of match played 18 September 2026

Appearances and goals by club, season and competition
Club	Season	League			Cup		Europe		Other		Total	
Club	Season	Division	Apps	Goals	Apps	Goals	Apps	Goals	Apps	Goals	Apps	Goals
Obolon Kyiv	2022–23	Ukrainian First League	19	3	—		—		—		19	3
Obolon Kyiv	2023–24	Ukrainian Premier League	29	6	—		—		2 (Note: Appearances in relegation play-offs)	1	31	7
Obolon Kyiv	Total		48	9	—		—		2	1	50	10
Rukh Lviv	2024–25	Ukrainian Premier League	17	6	1	0	—		—		18	6
Karpaty Lviv	2024–25	Ukrainian Premier League	13	1	—		—		—		13	1
Karpaty Lviv	2025–26	Ukrainian Premier League	16	4	2	1	—		—		18	5
Karpaty Lviv	Total		29	5	2	1	—		—		31	6
Polissya Zhytomyr	2025–26	Ukrainian Premier League	13	2	—		—		—		13	2
Polissya Zhytomyr	2026–27	Ukrainian Premier League	7	5	1	0	2 (Note: Appearances in UEFA Conference League)	1	—		10	6
Polissya Zhytomyr	Total		20	7	1	0	2	1	—		23	8
Career total			114	27	4	1	2	1	2	0	122	30

=== International ===
As of match played 17 November 2026

Appearances and goals by national team and year
National team	Year	Apps	Goals
Ukraine	2026	4	0
Total		4	0
