= Rostyslav Taranukha =

Ukrainian footballer

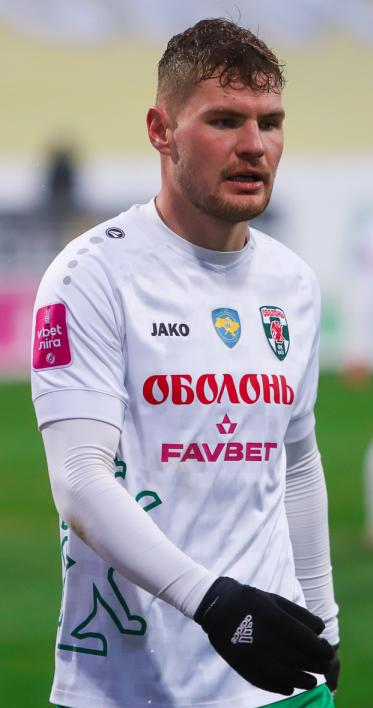

Personal information
- Full name: Rostyslav Yaroslavovych Taranukha
- Date of birth: 26 January 1997 (age 29)
- Place of birth: Lubny, Ukraine
- Height: 1.79 m (5 ft 10 in)
- Position: Midfielder

Team information
- Current team: Kolos Kovalivka

Youth career
- 2003–2014: Dynamo Kyiv

Senior career*
Years	Team	Apps	(Gls)
2014–2017	Dynamo Kyiv	0	(0)
2018–2019	Sumy	12	(2)
2019	Polissya Zhytomyr	6	(0)
2019–2020	Kremin Kremenchuk	18	(2)
2020	Cherkashchyna	10	(1)
2020	Polissya Zhytomyr	7	(0)
2022–2023	Karpaty Lviv	19	(6)
2023–2025	Obolon Kyiv	52	(6)
2025	Veres Rivne	8	(0)
2026–	Kolos Kovalivka	0	(0)

International career
2013–2014	Ukraine U17	10	(5)
2014–2015	Ukraine U18		(2)
2015–2016	Ukraine U19	5	(0)
- * Club domestic league appearances and goals as of 19 March 2026

Rostyslav Yaroslavovych Taranukha (Ukrainian: Ростислав Ярославович Тарануха; born 26 January 1997) is a Ukrainian professional footballer who plays as a midfielder for Ukrainian Premier League club Kolos Kovalivka.

== Club career ==
Taranukha is a product of Dynamo Kyiv academy. As part of the Dynamo under-19 team took part in the 2015–16 UEFA Youth League season. He came on as a substitute for Oleksiy Shchebetun when Dynamo was eliminated from the competition by Middlesbrough during the knockout phase.

He made his first official appearance at professional level competition after signing a contract with PFC Sumy in 2018 playing his first game for the club in the away match against Helios Kharkiv on 26 March 2018 in the Ukrainian First League in a 4-0 win. In 2019, Taranukha signed with the recently revived Polissya Zhytomyr that was just starting in the Ukrainian Second League. In summer of 2019, Taranukha returned to the Ukrainian First League after signing with Kremin Kremenchuk. Later that season, following the winter break, he signed with FC Cherkashchyna. Soon after the club was relegated, Taranukha returned to Polissya, which gained promotion.

In 2021 Taranukha was a futsal player for FC Karbon Cherkasy.

Following the restoration of football competitions after the 2022 full-scale Russian invasion, Taranukha signed with FC Karpaty Lviv.

Since 2023, Taranukha has played for FC Obolon Kyiv, which was just promoted to the 2023–24 Ukrainian Premier League. He made his first appearance in the League on 28 July 20023 in Round 1 of the competition when Obolon was hosting Kolos Kovalivka and tied the game at 0. Taranukha came on as a substitute for Ihor Krasnopir in the 69th minute.

== International career ==
Taranukha was on various Ukraine national youth teams.
