= Oleksandr Slobodian =

Ukrainian millionaire and politician

- Олександр Слободян
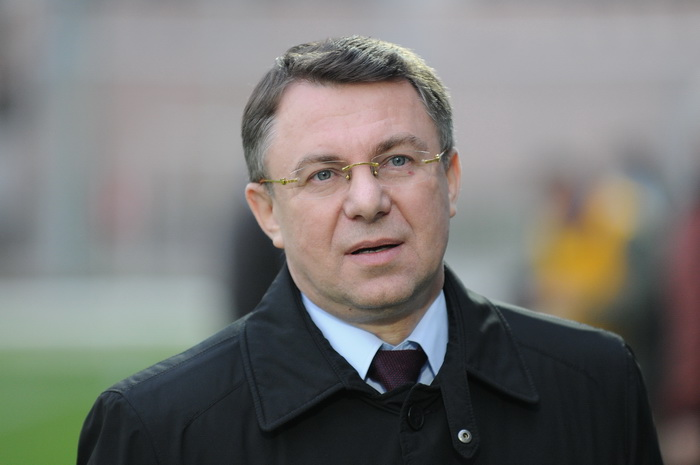
- Slobodian in 2012

People's Deputy of Ukraine
- In office 23 November 2007 – 12 December 2012
- Constituency: Our Ukraine–People's Self-Defense Bloc, No. 42
- In office 29 March 1998 – 25 May 2006
- Preceded by: Constituency established (1998)
- Succeeded by: Valeriy Asadchev (2002)
- Constituency: Kyiv, No. 220 (1998–2002); Our Ukraine Bloc, No. 7 (2002–2006)

Personal details
- Born: February 21, 1956 (age 70) Ternopil, Ukrainian SSR, Soviet Union (now Ukraine)
- Party: Ukrainian People's Party
- Other political affiliations: People's Movement of Ukraine (1998–2002); Our Ukraine–People's Self-Defense Bloc (2002–2012)
- Education: Kiev Food Technology Institute
- Occupation: Engineer, manager
- Known for: Founder and chair of the Obolon CJSC, FC Obolon

Oleksandr Vyacheslavovych Slobodian (Ukrainian: Олександр В'ячеславович Слободян: born February 21, 1956) is a Ukrainian millionaire businessman and politician. He is the original CEO and current honorary president of the Kyiv-based Obolon CJSC, Europe's largest brewing company, and the president of the Ukrainian Premier League football club Obolon Kyiv (both since 1998).

== Biography ==
Slobodian graduated from the Kiev Technological Institute of Food Science in 1978. Since 1980, he works for Obolon CJSC. In 1989, he became CEO and in 1993 the head of the board of Obolon. In 1998, he landed th posts President of CJSC Obolon and President of FC Obolon Kyiv.

Slobodian was also a long-time People's Deputy of Ukraine in the Verkhovna Rada (from 1998 until December 2012), representing the Our Ukraine Bloc & Our Ukraine–People's Self-Defense Bloc as a member of Ukrainian People's Party from 2002 till December 2012. Slobodian is a member of the Ukrainian People's Party since 1997. Since 1999, he is deputy head of the party. In the 2012 parliamentary election Slobodian unsuccessfully tried to get (re)-elected into parliament by falling to win a single-member districts (number 187) (first-past-the-post wins a parliament seat) located in Khmelnytskyi as an independent candidate. He was runner-up in the district with 28.26% of the votes.

On February 21, 2013 FC Obolon Kyiv (which he was the president of) withdrew voluntarily from the Ukrainian First League after Slobodyan had refused to finance the club after goalkeeper Kostyantyn Makhnovskyi was sold by the club without his consent. In December 2012, Slobodian announced he would create a new team under the moniker "Obolon Brovar".

Slobodian did not participate in the 2014 Ukrainian parliamentary election.
