= Illya Kvasnytsya =

Ukrainian footballer

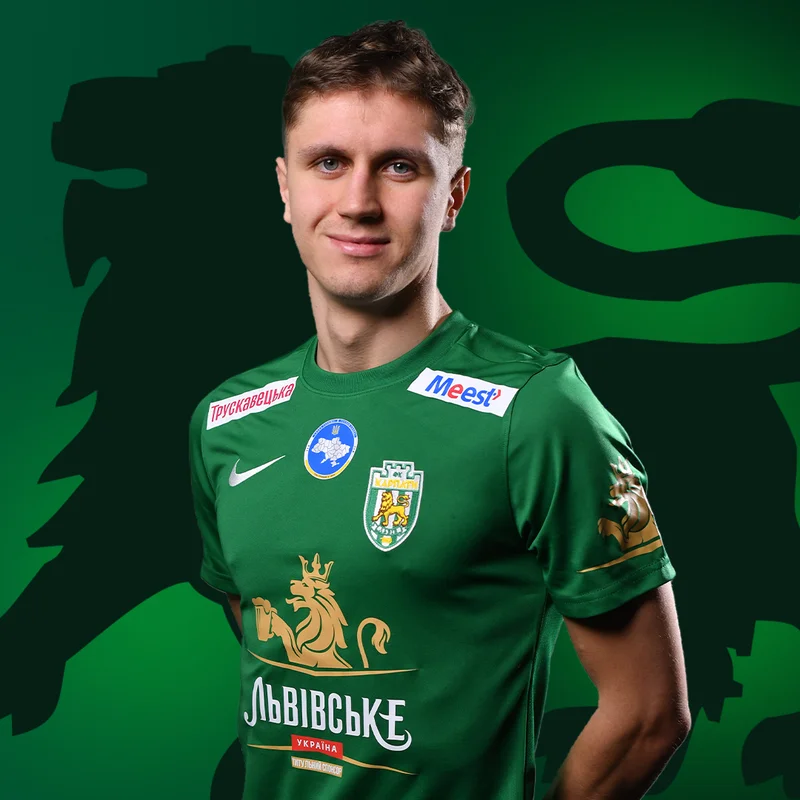

Personal information
- Full name: Illya Serhiyovych Kvasnytsya
- Date of birth: 20 March 2003 (age 23)
- Place of birth: Doroshivtsi, Ukraine
- Height: 1.72 m (5 ft 8 in)
- Position: Striker

Team information
- Current team: FC Livyl Bereh Kyiv
- Number: 14

Youth career
- 2015–2017: Bukovyna Chernivtsi
- 2017: Shakhtar Donetsk
- 2017–2018: Bukovyna Chernivtsi
- 2018–2020: UFK-Karpaty Lviv
- 2020–2021: Rukh Lviv

Senior career*
Years	Team	Apps	(Gls)
2021–2025	Rukh Lviv	67	(13)
2025	→ Karpaty Lviv (loan)	8	(0)
2026	Karpaty Lviv	8	(0)
2026-	FC Livyi Bereh Kyiv	6	(0)

International career^{‡}
2019	Ukraine U17	3	(0)
2022	Ukraine U19	3	(1)
2023–2025	Ukraine U21	17	(4)
- * Club domestic league appearances and goals as of 3 June 2026 ‡ National team caps and goals as of 19 June 2025

Illya Serhiyovych Kvasnytsya (Ukrainian: Ілля Сергійович Квасниця; born 20 March 2003) is a Ukrainian professional footballer who plays as a striker for Karpaty Lviv.

== Club career ==
=== Early years ===
Born in Doroshkivtsi, Chernivtsi Oblast, Kvasnytsia began his career in the local Bukovyna Chernivtsi youth sportive school, where his first coach was Yurii Kraft. Then he continued in the Shakhtar Donetsk, Karpaty Lviv and the Rukh Lviv academies.

=== Rukh Lviv ===
In September 2020 he signed a contract with the Ukrainian Premier League side Rukh Lviv. He made his debut in the Ukrainian Premier League on 7 December 2022 as a second half-time substituted player in a home match against Chornomorets Odesa.
