= Valentyn Horokh =

Ukrainian footballer (born 2001)

Personal information
- Full name: Valentyn Viktorovych Horokh
- Date of birth: 14 February 2001 (age 25)
- Place of birth: Slavuta, Ukraine
- Height: 1.87 m (6 ft 2 in)
- Position: Goalkeeper

Team information
- Current team: Veres Rivne
- Number: 91

Youth career
- 2014–2015: Shturm Kostopil
- 2015–2018: Karpaty Lviv

Senior career*
Years	Team	Apps	(Gls)
2018–2021	Karpaty Lviv	18	(0)
2021–2023	Oleksandriya	4	(0)
2023–2025	Kolos Kovalivka	4	(0)
2025–	Veres Rivne	25	(0)

International career^{‡}
2017	Ukraine U17	1	(0)
2019	Ukraine U18	5	(0)
- * Club domestic league appearances and goals as of 3 June 2026 ‡ National team caps and goals as of 8 March 2024

Valentyn Viktorovych Horokh (Ukrainian: Валентин Вікторович Горох; born 14 February 2001) is a Ukrainian professional footballer who plays as a goalkeeper for Veres Rivne in the Ukrainian Premier League.

== Career ==
Born in Slavuta, Khmelnytskyi Oblast, Horokh began his training career in the neighbouring Shturm academy from Kostopil, and after continued in the Karpaty academy.

He played in the Ukrainian Second League for Karpaty Lviv and in July 2021 Horokh signed contract with the Ukrainian Premier League side Oleksandriya.
