= Andriy Kitela =

Ukrainian footballer

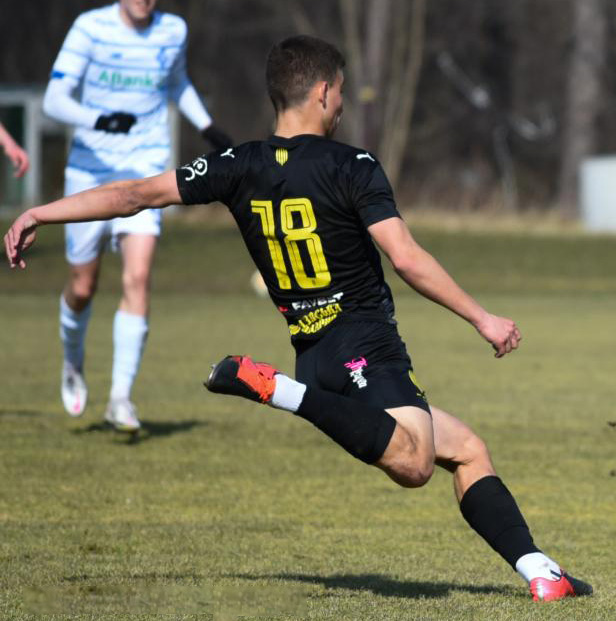

Personal information
- Full name: Andriy Yuriyovych Kitela
- Date of birth: 13 December 2004 (age 21)
- Place of birth: Stryi, Ukraine
- Height: 1.80 m (5 ft 11 in)
- Position: Right-back

Team information
- Current team: Rukh Lviv
- Number: 75

Youth career
- DYuSSh Stryi
- 2015–2020: Karpaty Lviv
- 2020–2022: Rukh Lviv

Senior career*
Years	Team	Apps	(Gls)
2022–26	Rukh Lviv	35	(0)
2023–26	→ Rukh-2 Lviv	22	(4)
2026-	FC LNZ Cherkasy	1	(0)

International career^{‡}
2020	Ukraine U16	2	(0)
2022–2023	Ukraine U19	6	(0)
- * Club domestic league appearances and goals as of 3 June 2026 ‡ National team caps and goals as of 16 December 2023

Andriy Yuriyovych Kitela (Ukrainian: Андрій Юрійович Кітела; born 13 December 2004) is a Ukrainian professional footballer who plays as a right-back for Rukh Lviv.

== Club career ==
=== Early years ===
Born in Stryi, Kitela began his career in the academy from his native city, where his first coaches were Vasyl Bahrych and Vitaliy Ponomaryov. Then he continued in the Karpaty Lviv and the Rukh Lviv academies.

=== Rukh Lviv ===
In September 2020 he signed a contract with the Ukrainian Premier League side Rukh Lviv. He made his debut in the Ukrainian Premier League on 19 October 2022 in an away match against Vorskla Poltava.
