= Vadym Hudzinskyi =

Ukrainian footballer

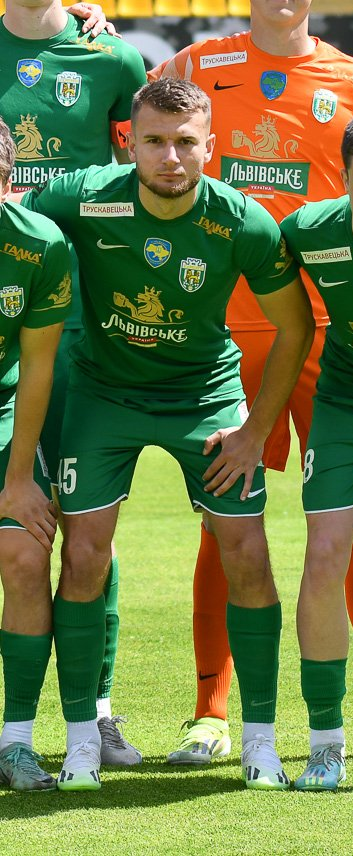

Personal information
- Full name: Vadym Vasylyovych Hudzinskyi
- Date of birth: 2 July 2001 (age 25)
- Place of birth: Pavliv, Ukraine
- Height: 1.76 m (5 ft 9 in)
- Position: Central midfielder

Team information
- Current team: Skala Stryi
- Number: 13

Youth career
- 2014–2018: UFK-Karpaty Lviv

Senior career*
Years	Team	Apps	(Gls)
2018–2021	Karpaty Lviv	24	(1)
2021–2023	Ahrobiznes Volochysk	11	(0)
2024	Karpaty-2 Lviv	8	(0)
2025–	Skala Stryi	33	(2)
- * Club domestic league appearances and goals as of 4 June 2026

Vadym Vasylyovych Hudzinskyi (Ukrainian: Вадим Васильович Гудзінський; born 2 July 2001) is a Ukrainian professional footballer who plays as a central midfielder for Ukrainian club Skala Stryi.
