= Stefan Fedak =

Ukrainian footballer

Personal information
- Full name: Stefan Oleksandrovych Fedak
- Date of birth: 18 March 1998 (age 28)
- Place of birth: Uzhhorod, Ukraine
- Height: 1.79 m (5 ft 10 in)
- Position: Left-back

Team information
- Current team: Uzhhorod
- Number: 13

Youth career
- 2011–2015: SDYuSShOR Uzhhorod

Senior career*
Years	Team	Apps	(Gls)
2015	Serednye		
2015–2016	Hoverla Uzhhorod	0	(0)
2016	Spartakus Uzhhorod	24	(1)
2017–2019	Mynai	35	(3)
2019–	Uzhhorod	51	(1)
- * Club domestic league appearances and goals as of 14 February 2022

Stefan Oleksandrovych Fedak (Ukrainian: Стефан Олександрович Федак; born 18 March 1998) is a Ukrainian professional footballer who plays as a left-back for Ukrainian club Uzhhorod.
