= Obolon (company) =

Ukrainian brewer and soft drinks producer

Obolon JSC
- Company type: Private
- Industry: Beverages
- Founded: 1980; 46 years ago, in Kyiv, Ukraine
- Headquarters: Kyiv, Ukraine
- Key people: Oleksandr Slobodian (honorary president)
- Products: beer, sodas, cocktails, mineral water
- Revenue: ₴4.5 billion (2010)
- Net income: ₴90 million (2010)
- Number of employees: 6,500 (2010)
- Website: obolon.com

Obolon Joint Stock Company (Ukrainian: ПАТ "Оболонь") is a major Ukrainian producer of beverages: beer, low alcohol drinks (cocktails), soda drinks and locally extracted natural mineral water, as well as a major malt producer. Based in Kyiv, Obolon JSC has sites across Ukraine and employs several thousand people.

Obolon's main plant in Kyiv is the largest brewing facility in Europe by installed capacity. As of 2008, that facility was Europe's largest single beer manufacturer in terms of physical volume. Obolon's plant in Khmelnytskyi Oblast is the largest malting facility in Europe by installed capacity.

== History ==
The company's main brewery was built in 1980 based on designs made by Czech engineers, near an artesian well in Kyiv's Obolon district. Initially called 'Kyiv brewery #3', it was renamed 'Obolon' in 1986. In 1992, Obolon became the first privatized company in independent Ukraine and registered its corporate brand Obolon (Ukrainian: Оболонь). The shares of company stock were distributed among its employees. In 1993, Obolon changed its legal status to a closed joint-stock company (currently it is a private joint stock company under present legislation).

In 1997, Obolon obtained a $40 million loan from the European Bank for Reconstruction and Development (EBRD) to significantly expand its production capacities. In 2009, Obolon obtained a further $50 million loan from the EBRD towards financial stability and increased energy efficiency.

In 2011 Obolon is changing its form of ownership, becoming a public joint stock company. Molson Coors Brewing Company and Obolon Corporation announce commercial cooperation in Ukraine. This is how the legendary Carling beer appeared on the Ukrainian market. Obolon Corporation ranks 28th in the world in terms of beer production in 2010 and is the first exporter of beer to China.

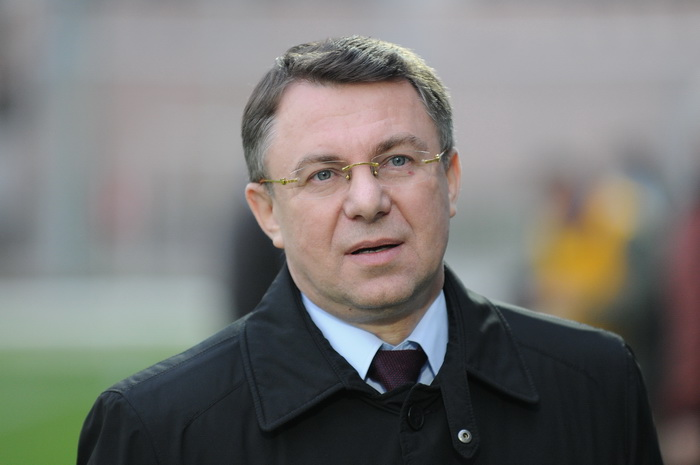
Oleksandr Slobodian

Oleksandr Slobodian, the CEO and veteran of the company was also a national politician till the 2012 Ukrainian parliamentary election; he was a member of the Verkhovna Rada and has represented the conservative People's Movement of Ukraine for three consecutive sessions.

In 2020, Obolon launched a large-scale renovation of Obolon TM and Zibert TM took place. New beers, cider ("Ciber Rose"), two new flavors of soft drinks TM "Zhyvchyk" were released, mineral water "Obolonskaya low-carbonated". The company was also the first in Ukraine to launch low-alcohol beverages new to the market in the category of "hard zeltser".

== Structure ==
The Obolon Corporation has its own malting plant, able to produce 120,000 tonnes of malt per year. The malting plant uses equipment from the German company Schmidt-Seeger. Obolon uses the malt in its own products and exports it.

Obolon has its main site in Kyiv and 8 facilities in Ukraine:

- Bershad (Vinnytsia Oblast),
- Fastiv (Kyiv Oblast),
- Krasyliv and Chemerivtsi (Khmelnytskyi Oblast),
- Kolomyia (Ivano-Frankivsk Oblast)
- Oleksandria (Kirovohrad Oblast),
- Okhtyrka (Sumy Oblast)
- Rokytne (Rivne Oblast)
- Sevastopol.

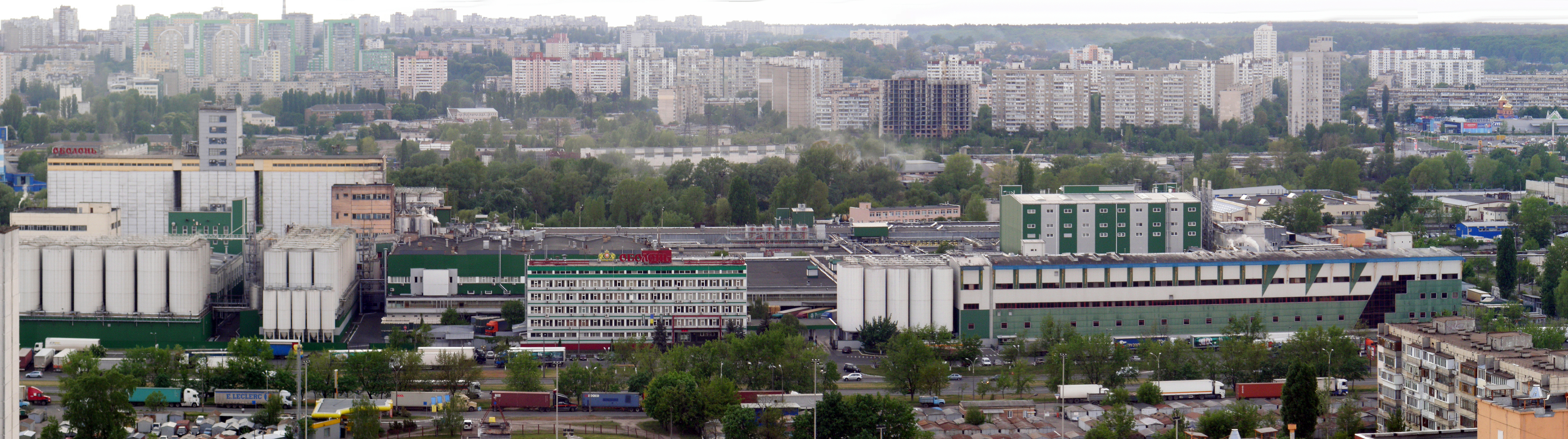
The main Obolon plant on Bohatyrska Str. in Kyiv

== Products and market share ==
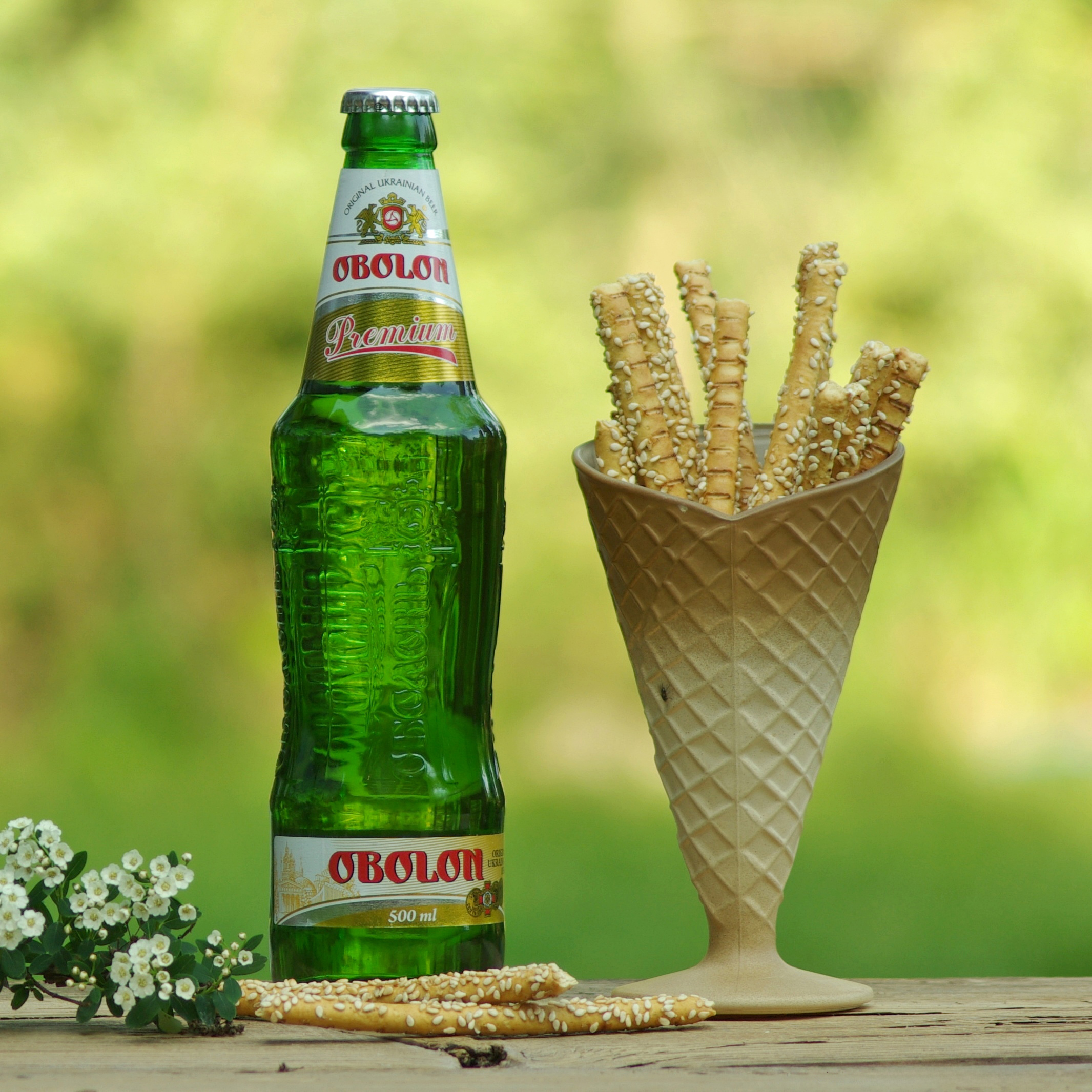
Obolon Premium

Obolon sells beer under six brands: Obolon, Obolon BeerMix, Magnat, hike premium beer, Zibert and Desant. Brands for its non-alcoholic products are Zhyvchyk, Prozora and Obolonska mineral waters, and the Jett line of energy drinks. The enterprise also produces low-alcohol beverages, such as kvass. Obolon bottles Bitburger beer under license.

Obolon is the largest Ukrainian exporter of beer, accounting for 80% of Ukrainian beer exports. It was the first Ukrainian brewery to export to the United States. As of 2020, the company exported to 33 countries. It started exporting beer to China in 2011. Prior to 2014, most exports were to Russia. In September 2014, Russia banned imports of Ukrainian beer over alleged inaccuracies in the nutrition information displayed on the products' labels. Early summer 2015 the company signed a licensing agreement with the Moscow Brewing Company to make beer inside Russia under its label, hence to re-enter the Russian beer market. In March 2022, the company withdrew from this agreement following Russia's military invasion of Ukraine.

== Sponsoring ==
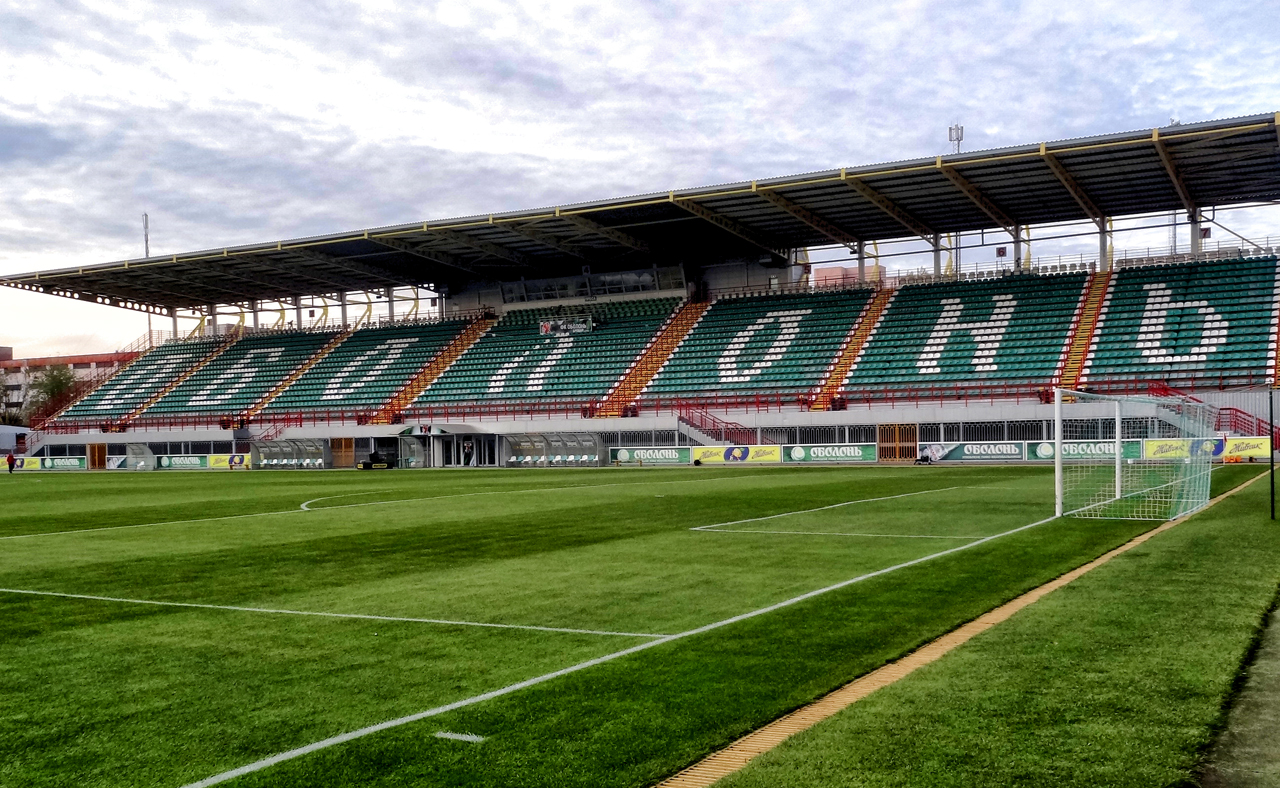
Obolon Arena

Obolon has sponsored FC Obolon Kyiv since 1999. The company's CEO was an amateur footballer in his youth. On 21 February 2013 FC Obolon Kyiv withdrew voluntary from the Ukrainian First League after Obolon CEO Slobodyan had refused to finance the club after goalkeeper Kostyantyn Makhnovskyi was sold by the club without his consent. In December 2012 Slobodian announced he would create a new team under the moniker "Obolon Brovar" (Obolon Brewery). This club started its residence in competitive football in the 2013–14 Ukrainian Second League season.

== See also ==
- Beer
- Economy of Ukraine
