= Roman Didyk =

Ukrainian footballer

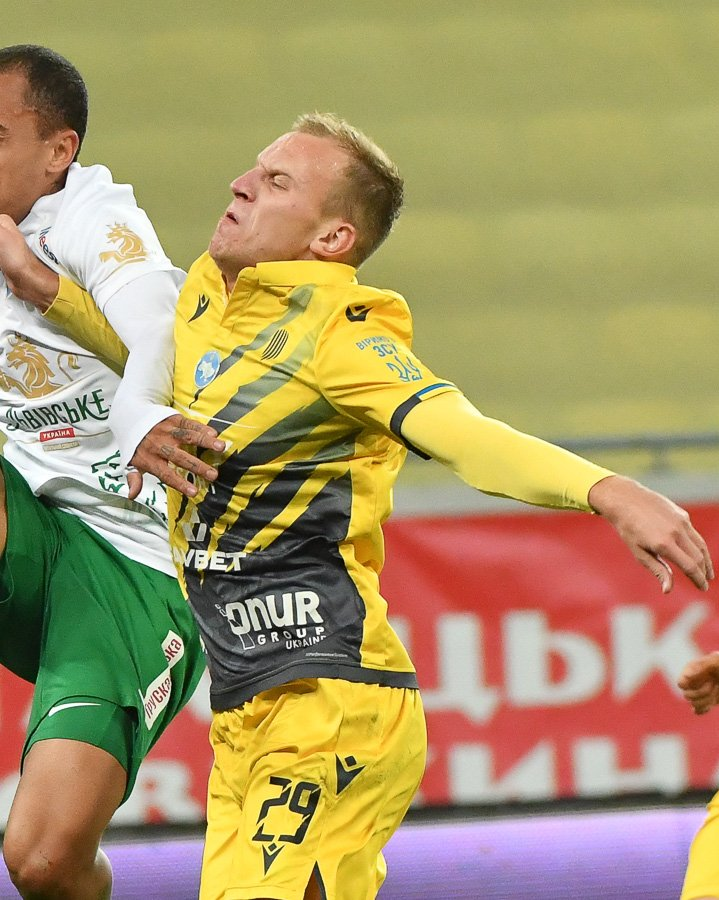

Personal information
- Full name: Roman Ihorovych Didyk
- Date of birth: 2 December 2002 (age 23)
- Place of birth: Lviv, Ukraine
- Height: 1.85 m (6 ft 1 in)
- Position: Centre-back

Team information
- Current team: LNZ Cherkasy
- Number: 29

Youth career
- 2011–2015: Rukh Vynnyky
- 2015–2019: UFK-Karpaty Lviv

Senior career*
Years	Team	Apps	(Gls)
2019–2021	Ahrobiznes Volochysk	42	(2)
2021–2025	Rukh Lviv	88	(4)
2025–	LNZ Cherkasy	24	(1)

International career
2017	Ukraine U16	4	(0)
2019	Ukraine U18	1	(0)
2022–2023	Ukraine U21	3	(0)
2024	Ukraine U23	1	(0)
- * Club domestic league appearances and goals as of 3 June 2026

Roman Ihorovych Didyk (Ukrainian: Роман Ігорович Дідик; born 2 December 2002) is a Ukrainian professional footballer who plays as a centre-back for LNZ Cherkasy.

== Club career ==
On 23 July 2021, he moved to Rukh Lviv, and made his league debut two days after in the losing match against Metalist 1925 Kharkiv in the 2021–22 Ukrainian Premier League.

== International career ==
On 6 March 2024, Didyk was called up by Ruslan Rotan to the Ukraine Olympic football team preliminary squad as a preparation to the 2024 Summer Olympics.
