= Oleksiy Sych =

Ukrainian footballer (born 2001)

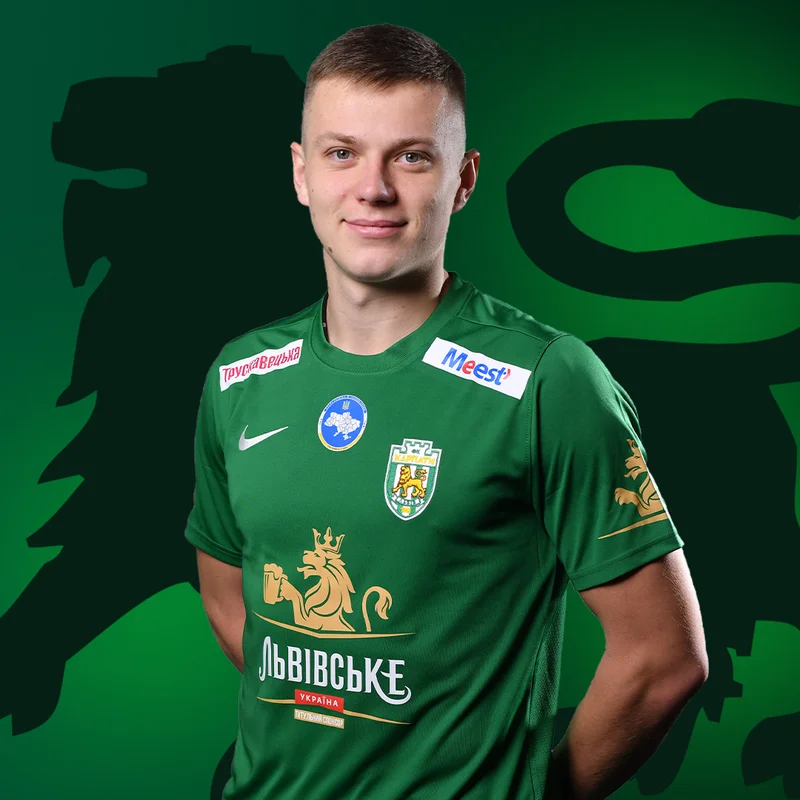

Personal information
- Full name: Oleksiy Mykolayovych Sych
- Date of birth: 1 April 2001 (age 25)
- Place of birth: Zorya, Rivne Oblast, Ukraine
- Height: 1.85 m (6 ft 1 in)
- Position: Midfielder

Team information
- Current team: Dynamo Kyiv
- Number: 5

Youth career
- 2015–2018: Karpaty Lviv

Senior career*
Years	Team	Apps	(Gls)
2020	Karpaty Lviv	2	(0)
2020–2024	Rukh Lviv	63	(1)
2020	→ Karpaty Halych (loan)	6	(0)
2022–2023	→ Kortrijk (loan)	14	(1)
2025–2026	Karpaty Lviv	22	(0)
2026–	Dynamo Kyiv	8	(0)

International career^{‡}
2021–2023	Ukraine U21	22	(0)
2024	Ukraine U23	5	(0)
2024–	Ukraine	2	(0)
Medal record
Men's football
Representing Ukraine
UEFA European Under-21 Championship
Bronze medal – third place	2023 Georgia-Romania
- * Club domestic league appearances and goals as of 23 October 2026 ‡ National team caps and goals as of 20 March 2025

Oleksiy Mykolayovych Sych (Ukrainian: Олексій Миколайович Сич [olekˈs⁽ʲ⁾ij ˈsɪtʃ]; born 1 April 2001) is a Ukrainian professional footballer who plays as a defender for Dynamo Kyiv and the Ukraine national team.

== Club career ==
Sych was born in Zorya, Rivne Raion, and is a product of the FC Karpaty Lviv School Sportive System. He made a one and half year break in the playing career, because of an injury.

He made his debut for Karpaty Lviv as the main-squad player in the draw away derby match against FC Lviv on 14 March 2020 in the Ukrainian Premier League.

=== Dynamo Kyiv ===
On 21 July 2026, Sych signed a 3-year contract with Dynamo Kyiv.

== International career ==
On 6 March 2024, Sych was called up by Ruslan Rotan to the Ukraine Olympic football team preliminary squad as a preparation to the 2024 Summer Olympics.

Sych made his debut for Ukraine national team on 19 November 2024 in a Nations League game against Albania at Arena Kombëtare. He substituted Yukhym Konoplya in the 76th minute, as Ukraine won 2–1.

== Personal life ==
His father, Mykola Sych, played as an amateur for Veres Rivne and ODEK Orzhiv.

== Career statistics ==
=== Club ===
As of match played 27 October 2026

Appearances and goals by club, season and competition
Club	Season	League			National cup		Europe		Other		Total	
Club	Season	Division	Apps	Goals	Apps	Goals	Apps	Goals	Apps	Goals	Apps	Goals
Karpaty Lviv	2019–20	Ukrainian Premier League	2	0	—		—		—		2	0
Rukh Lviv	2020–21	Ukrainian Premier League	2	0	—		—		—		2	0
Rukh Lviv	2021–22	Ukrainian Premier League	12	0	1	0	—		—		13	0
Rukh Lviv	2022–23	Ukrainian Premier League	3	0	—		—		—		3	0
Rukh Lviv	2023–24	Ukrainian Premier League	30	1	—		—		—		30	1
Rukh Lviv	2024–25	Ukrainian Premier League	16	0	1	0	—		—		17	0
Rukh Lviv	Total		63	1	2	0	—		—		65	1
Karpaty Halych (loan)	2020–21	Ukrainian Second League	6	0	—		—		—		6	0
Kortrijk (loan)	2022–23	Belgian Pro League	14	1	3	0	—		—		17	1
Karpaty Lviv	2024–25	Ukrainian Premier League	4	0	—		—		—		4	0
Karpaty Lviv	2025–26	Ukrainian Premier League	18	0	—		—		—		18	0
Karpaty Lviv	Total		22	0	—		—		—		22	0
Dynamo Kyiv	2026–27	Ukrainian Premier League	8	0	2	0	3 (Note: One appearance in UEFA Europa League, two appearances in UEFA Conference League)	0	—		13	0
Career total			115	2	7	0	3	0	0	0	125	2

=== International ===
As of match played 20 March 2025

Appearances and goals by national team and year
National team	Year	Apps	Goals
Ukraine	2024	1	0
Ukraine	2025	1	0
Total		2	0
