= Denys Pidhurskyi =

Ukrainian footballer

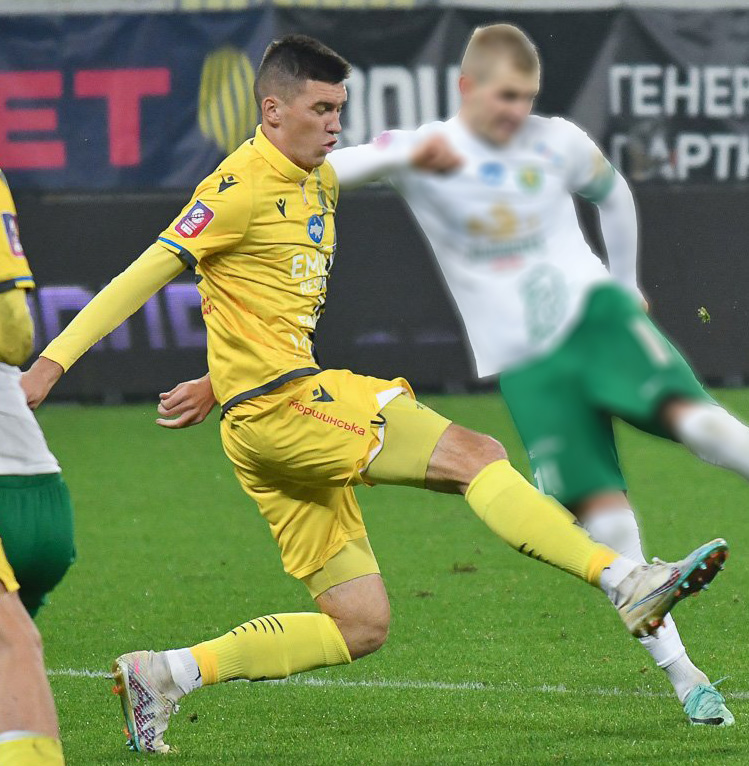
- Denys Pidhurskyi playing for Rukh Lviv in 2024

Personal information
- Full name: Denys Stepanovych Pidhurskyi
- Date of birth: 27 May 2003 (age 23)
- Place of birth: Seredkevychi, Lviv Oblast, Ukraine
- Height: 1.91 m (6 ft 3 in)
- Position: Midfielder

Team information
- Current team: Kryvbas Kryvyi Rih
- Number: 6

Youth career
- 2011–2013: Rava Rava-Ruska
- 2013–2020: UFK-Karpaty Lviv

Senior career*
Years	Team	Apps	(Gls)
2020–2021	Karpaty Lviv	20	(2)
2021–2026	Rukh Lviv	83	(2)
2023	→ Rukh-2 Lviv	7	(1)
2026–	Kryvbas Kryvyi Rih	5	(0)

International career^{‡}
2022	Ukraine U19	2	(0)
- * Club domestic league appearances and goals as of 7 September 2026 ‡ National team caps and goals as of 7 December 2022

Denys Stepanovych Pidhurskyi (Ukrainian: Денис Степанович Підгурський; born 27 May 2003) is a Ukrainian professional footballer who plays as a midfielder for Kryvbas Kryvyi Rih.

== Career ==
Born in Seredkevychi, Yavoriv Raion, Lviv Oblast, Pidhurskyi is a product of the Rava Rava-Ruska and FC Karpaty Lviv youth systems.

In July 2021 he transferred RukhLviv.
