= Bohdan Slyubyk =

Ukrainian footballer

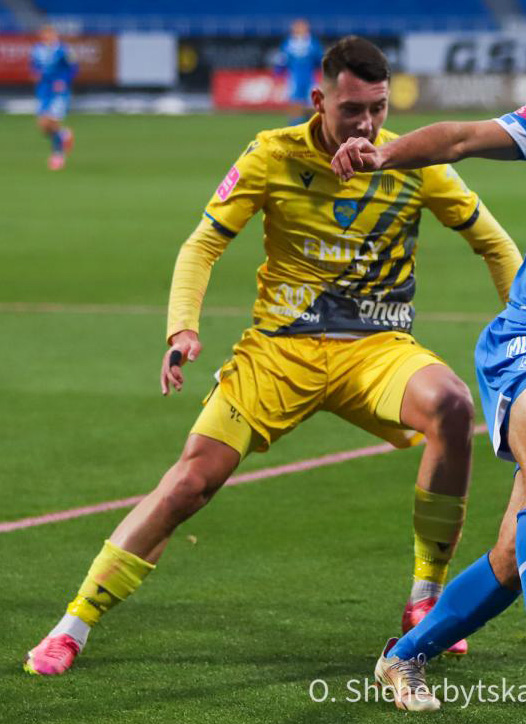
- Bohdan Slyubyk playing for Rukh Lviv in 2023

Personal information
- Full name: Bohdan Ivanovych Slyubyk
- Date of birth: 11 February 2004 (age 22)
- Place of birth: Ushkovychi, Lviv Oblast, Ukraine
- Height: 1.86 m (6 ft 1 in)
- Position: Centre-back

Team information
- Current team: LNZ Cherkasy (on loan from Pardubice)
- Number: 92

Youth career
- 2014–2020: Karpaty Lviv
- 2020–2021: Rukh Lviv

Senior career*
Years	Team	Apps	(Gls)
2020	Karpaty Lviv	0	(0)
2020–2026	Rukh Lviv	77	(4)
2026–	Pardubice	1	(0)
2026	Pardubice B	9	(0)
2026–	→ LNZ Cherkasy (loan)	1	(0)

International career^{‡}
2019–2020	Ukraine U16	4	(0)
2022–2023	Ukraine U19	5	(0)
2023–	Ukraine U21	2	(0)
- * Club domestic league appearances and goals as of 12 September 2026 ‡ National team caps and goals as of 19 June 2025

Bohdan Ivanovych Slyubyk (Ukrainian: Богдан Іванович Слюбик; born 11 February 2004) is a Ukrainian professional footballer who plays as a centre-back for LNZ Cherkasy on loan from Pardubice.

== Club career ==
=== Pardubice ===
In January 2026, Slyubyk transferred to Czech First League side Pardubice, signing a four-and-a-half-year contract.

==== Loan to LNZ Cherkasy ====
In September 2026, Slyubyk joined Ukrainian Premier League club LNZ Cherkasy on a season-long loan.
