= Vladyslav Mudryk =

Ukrainian footballer

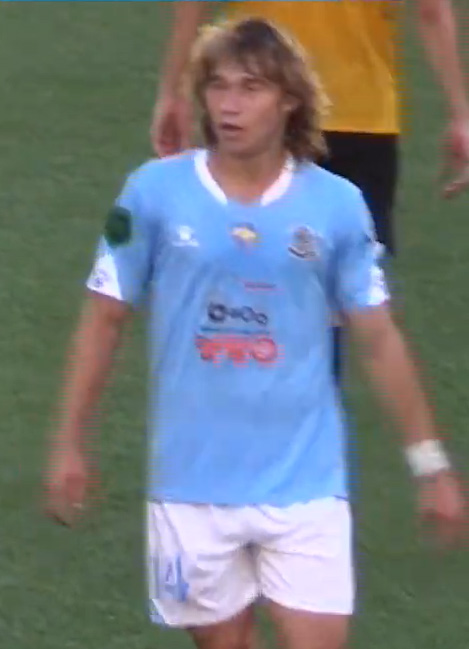
- Mudryk with Olimpik Donetsk in 2021

Personal information
- Full name: Vladyslav Oleksandrovych Mudryk
- Date of birth: 17 January 2001 (age 25)
- Place of birth: Novovolynsk, Ukraine
- Height: 1.74 m (5 ft 9 in)
- Position: Right-back

Team information
- Current team: Metalist Kharkiv
- Number: 15

Youth career
- 2013–2018: UFK-Karpaty Lviv

Senior career*
Years	Team	Apps	(Gls)
2018–2021	Karpaty Lviv	19	(1)
2021	Pogoń Lwów	0	(0)
2021–2022	Olimpik Donetsk	5	(0)
2022–	Metalist Kharkiv	0	(0)

International career^{‡}
2018	Ukraine U17	10	(0)
- * Club domestic league appearances and goals as of 17 October 2022 ‡ National team caps and goals as of 17 October 2022

Vladyslav Oleksandrovych Mudryk (Ukrainian: Владислав Олександрович Мудрик; born 17 January 2001) is a Ukrainian professional footballer who plays as a right-back for Ukrainian Premier League club Metalist Kharkiv.
