= Vasyl Runich =

Ukrainian footballer

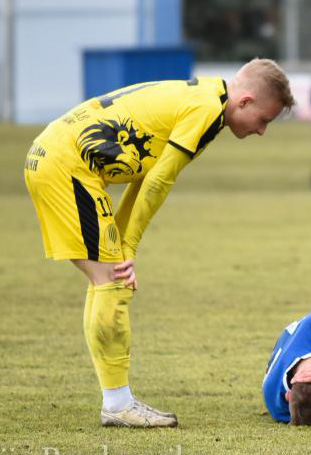
- Vasyl Runich playing for Rukh Lviv U-21 in 2021

Personal information
- Full name: Vasyl Zenoviyovych Runich
- Date of birth: 21 January 2000 (age 26)
- Place of birth: Livchytsi, Zhydachiv Raion, Lviv Oblast, Ukraine
- Height: 1.68 m (5 ft 6 in)
- Position: Midfielder

Youth career
- 2011–2012: Youth Sportive School Zhydachiv
- 2012–2017: Karpaty Lviv

Senior career*
Years	Team	Apps	(Gls)
2017–2020	Karpaty Lviv	5	(0)
2020–2026	Rukh Lviv	105	(8)
2023	→ Rukh-2 Lviv	3	(4)
2026-	FC Prykarpattia Ivano-Frankivsk (1998)	14	(1)
- * Club domestic league appearances and goals as of 3/11/26 @ 11:20(AEST)

Vasyl Zenoviyovych Runich (Ukrainian: Василь Зеновійович Руніч; born 31 January 2000) is a Ukrainian professional footballer who plays as a midfielder.

== Career ==
Runich was born in Zhydachiv Raion, Western Ukraine and is a product of Youth Sportive School in his native raion centre and the FC Karpaty Lviv School System, where played for it in the Ukrainian Premier League Reserves and Under 19 Championship during some seasons.

He made his debut for FC Karpaty as the second half-time substituted player in the draw home derby match against FC Lviv on 27 June 2020 in the Ukrainian Premier League.
