= Yehor Prokopenko =

Ukrainian footballer

Personal information
- Full name: Yehor Volodymyrovych Prokopenko
- Date of birth: 24 May 1998 (age 28)
- Place of birth: Kyiv, Ukraine
- Height: 1.78 m (5 ft 10 in)
- Position: Left back

Team information
- Current team: Obolon Kyiv
- Number: 24

Youth career
- 2008–2011: Kyiv
- 2011–2013: Arsenal Kyiv
- 2013: Kyiv
- 2013–2015: Atlet Kyiv
- 2017: Obolon-Brovar Kyiv

Senior career*
Years	Team	Apps	(Gls)
2017–	Obolon Kyiv	116	(3)
2016–2017	→ Obolon-2 Bucha	12	(1)
2019–2021	→ Obolon-2 Bucha	19	(2)
- * Club domestic league appearances and goals as of 3 June 2026

Yehor Volodymyrovych Prokopenko (Ukrainian: Єгор Володимирович Прокопенко; born 24 May 1998) is a Ukrainian professional footballer who plays as a left back for Ukrainian club Obolon Kyiv.
