= Vitaliy Roman =

Ukrainian footballer

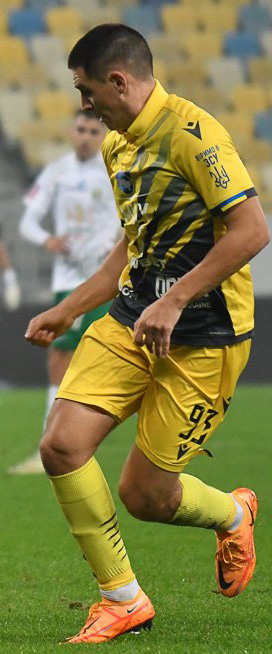

Personal information
- Full name: Vitaliy Vasylyovych Roman
- Date of birth: 15 April 2003 (age 23)
- Place of birth: Novyi Rozdil, Ukraine
- Height: 1.78 m (5 ft 10 in)
- Position: Defender

Team information
- Current team: LNZ Cherkasy
- Number: 93

Youth career
- –2012: Youth Sportive School Novyi Rozdil
- 2012–2020: UFK-Karpaty Lviv

Senior career*
| Years | Team | Apps | (Gls) |
| 2020 | Karpaty Lviv | 1 | (0) |
| 2021–26 | Rukh Lviv | 104 | (3) |
| 2026- | FC LNZ Cherkasy | 0 | (0) |

International career^{‡}
| 2019–2020 | Ukraine U17 | 13 | (0) |
| 2022 | Ukraine U19 | 3 | (0) |
| 2022–2025 | Ukraine U21 | 16 | (1) |
- * Club domestic league appearances and goals as of 4/10/26 @ 11:22(AEST) ‡ National team caps and goals as of 19 June 2025

Vitaliy Vasylyovych Roman (Ukrainian: Віталій Васильович Роман; born 15 April 2003) is a Ukrainian professional footballer who plays as a defender for Ukrainian Premier League club Rukh Lviv.

== Career ==
Born in Novyi Rozdil, Roman is a product of the local youth sportive school and the UFK-Karpaty Lviv youth sportive school system. His first trainer was Viktor Pavroznyk.

He played for FC Karpaty Lviv in the Ukrainian Premier League Reserves and later was promoted to the senior team after Karpaty was relegated into the Ukrainian Second League. Roman made his debut for FC Karpaty as a second-half substitute against FC Chernihiv on 19 September 2020. The following month, he signed with Ukrainian Premier League side FC Rukh Lviv.

He made his debut for Rukh Lviv on 21 August 2021 as a starter against SC Dnipro-1.
