= Ostap Prytula =

Ukrainian footballer

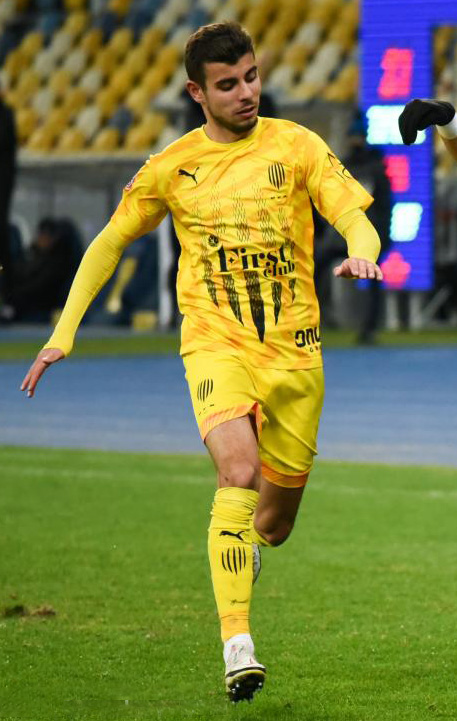
- Ostap Prytula playing for Rukh Lviv in 2021

Personal information
- Full name: Ostap Ihorovych Prytula
- Date of birth: 24 June 2000 (age 26)
- Place of birth: Lviv, Ukraine
- Height: 1.75 m (5 ft 9 in)
- Position: Midfielder

Team information
- Current team: Rukh Lviv
- Number: 10

Youth career
- 200?–2011: Pokrova Lviv
- 2011–2020: Karpaty Lviv

Senior career*
Years	Team	Apps	(Gls)
2020	Karpaty Lviv	7	(0)
2020–26	Rukh Lviv	71	(4)
2024	→ Rukh-2 Lviv	3	(0)
2026-	FC Oleksandriya	8	(0)

International career^{‡}
2016	Ukraine U16	2	(0)
- * Club domestic league appearances and goals as of 25/10/26 @ 16:50(AEST) ‡ National team caps and goals as of 11 August 2020

Ostap Ihorovych Prytula (Ukrainian: Остап Ігорович Притула; born 24 June 2000) is a Ukrainian professional footballer who plays as a midfielder for Rukh Lviv.

== Career ==
Prytula was born in Lviv, Western Ukraine and is a product of the local FC Pokrova and FC Karpaty Lviv School Sportive Systems.

He made his debut for FC Karpaty as the main-squad player in the draw home match against SC Dnipro-1 on 23 February 2020 in the Ukrainian Premier League.
