= FC Obolon Kyiv =

Obolon Kyiv
- Full name: Football Club Obolon Kyiv
- Nicknames: Pyvovary (Ukrainian: Пивовари, The Brewers)
- Founded: 13 June 1992
- Ground: Obolon Arena
- Capacity: 5,100
- Owner: Oleksandr Slobodian
- Director: Oleksandr Riznychenko
- Manager: Oleksandr Antonenko (caretaker)
- League: Ukrainian Premier League
- 2025–26: Ukrainian Premier League, 12th of 16
- Website: fc.obolon.ua
Home colours	Away colours	Third colours

Old logo

FC Obolon Kyiv (Ukrainian: Оболонь Київ, pronounced [oboˈǀɔnʲ ˈkɪjiu̯]) is a Ukrainian professional football club based in Kyiv (Obolonskyi District). Its home colors are green shirts and white shorts; while its away uniforms are white shirts and green shorts. Its main sponsor was the brewery Obolon in 1999–2013. Since 2013, the club is owned by the factory.

The club was reformed in 2013 due to administrative issues and hence the team withdrew from the Professional Football League of Ukraine during the 2012–13 Ukrainian First League season in February 2013. The club restarted from amateur competitions. Between 2013 and 2020, the team was known as Obolon-Brovar Kyiv.

== History ==
=== Names ===
- 1992: FC Zmina
- 1993: FC Zmina-Obolon (after a Kyiv neighborhood Obolon)
- 1995: FC Obolon
- 1997: FC Obolon-PPO
- 1999: FC Obolon JSC (brewery became officially the club's sponsor)
- 2001: FC Obolon (after its sponsor Obolon Brewery)
- 2013: FC Obolon-Brovar (forced to reorganized and renamed)
- 2020: FC Obolon

=== Obolon (original) ===
The football club was created in 1992 by a collective of enthusiasts based on the specialized sports school of Olympic Reserve Zmina in Kyiv. The team changed its name to Zmina-Obolon in 1993 because it was located in the historical neighborhood in Kyiv. The same year as Zmina-Obolon, the club participated in the national amateur competitions KFK at first placing third and next year winning a group competitions. After its promotion to professionals, the name portion Zmina was dropped leaving only with Obolon in 1995, and later changed to Obolon PPO in 1997. It adopted its current name on 23 April 2001. In 1995, it received professional status and entered the Ukrainian Second League for the 1995–96 season.

After finishing 3rd in the Ukrainian First League 2001–02 season, Obolon was promoted to the Ukrainian Premier League when that competition expanded to 16 teams for the 2002–03 season. Obolon was relegated to the Ukrainian First League after finishing 15th (out of 16) in the 2004–05 season. Until 2002, Obolon played its home games at Zmina Stadium and sometimes at the sport complex of Bilshovyk factory.

In the 2008–09 season, Obolon finished second in the Ukrainian First League and were promoted to the Ukrainian Premier League for the 2009–10 season for the second time.

The club competed in the Premier League for three seasons and was relegated after the 2011–12 Ukrainian Premier League season.

At the end of 2012, a conflict arose in club due to a transfer policy of the club. Major club sponsor Slobodyan had refused to finance the club after goalkeeper Kostyantyn Makhnovskyi was sold by the club without his consent. Due to lack of financing, on 21 February 2013, the club was forced to withdraw from the Ukrainian First League.

=== Obolon Brovar ===
In December 2012, the president of Obolon, Oleksandr Slobodian, announced he would create a new team under the moniker Obolon-Brovar ("Obolon Brewery"). The reorganized club was completely restructured and brought to a complete control of the Obolon factory, unlike its predecessor that was a public organization which was sponsored by the factory. In spring 2013, the team applied to PFL and was accepted for the 2013–14 Ukrainian Second League season.

In early March 2013, it was announced that the former honorary president of Obolon Kyiv, Oleksandr Slobodian would form a new football team called Obolon Brovar. Legally the team could not keep the old name and had to register a new name. FC Obolon as a public organization with Obolon brewery as its title sponsor was reorganized into a limited liability company of Obolon brewery and completely owned by the last. During the organization many first team players left, but infrastructure with its academy, staff and stadium were preserved.

Learning about a new club, the fans of Obolon immediately appealed to the new leadership of Obolon-Brovar with a request to leave the symbols and logos of the old club. Also they asked not to put on the club emblem the year the club was founded.

Only the doctors, administrators, massage therapists and reserve team coach Obolon-2 Kyiv Oleg Mazurenko moved from the former club to the new club. Also some players from Obolon-2 Kyiv and experienced defenders Andriy Kornyev and Valeriy Ivaschenko, who once played for Obolon Kyiv. All the rest were alumni from the Youth Academy Zmina-Obolon. Serhiy Soldatov was appointed head coach of the new team, who worked previously in the Youth Academy which was based with the team "Obolon Brovar". For the second season in the second league "Obolon Brovar" took second place and went into the first league. The season of 2015/2016, the "Brewers" finished at a high third place and were close to raising in the Premier League. The season was held mediocre by the team, however, in the Ukrainian Cup reached the 1/8 finals where the penalty kick lost to MFC Mykolaiv.

=== Obolon (2020 re-renaming) ===
In August 2020 Obolon-Brovar Kyiv was renamed (again) to Obolon Kyiv. The club's logo was changed accordingly. The 2022-23 season saw Obolon Kyiv get promoted to the Ukrainian Premier League for the 2023-24 season. They finished 14th in the league but beat Livyi Bereh Kyiv in the play-offs (1–0 home, 1–1 away).

== Stadium ==
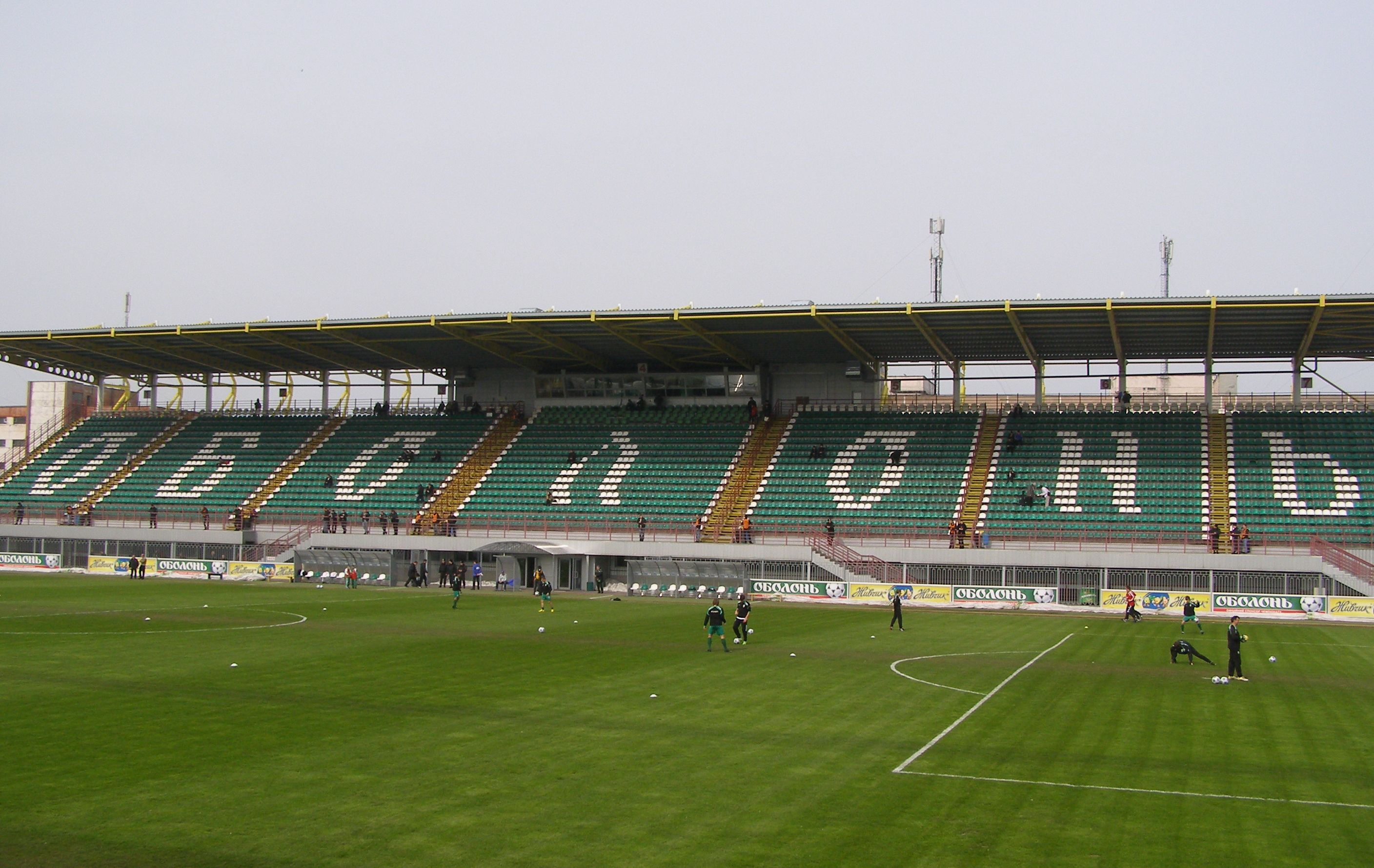
Obolon Arena

The club originally played at its Zmina Stadium.

Since 2002, it plays at Obolon Arena, while Zmina Stadium is used by its football academy Sports school Zmina Kyiv. Unlike Zmina Stadium that is located closer to the city's centre, Obolon Arena is located right on northern outskirts of Kyiv on vulytsia Pivnichna (Northern Street).

== Honours ==
- Ukrainian First League
  - Runners-up (2): 2008–09, 2022–23
- PFL U–19
  - Winners (1): 2017–18
- Ukrainian Second League
  - Winners (2): 1998–99, 2000–01
  - Runners-up (1): 2014–15
- Ukrainian Amateur Football Championship
  - Winners (1): 1994–95

=== Football kits and sponsors ===
Years	Football kit	Shirt sponsor
2002–2003	adidas	Obolon
2003–2005	nike	Obolon
2009–2011	puma	Obolon
2011–2012	puma	Carling

== League and cup history ==
Season	Div.	Pos.	Pl.	W	D	L	GS	GA	P	Domestic Cup	Europe		Notes
As FC Obolon Kyiv (1993–2013)
1993–94	4th (Amateur League)	3	22	14	5	3	32	17	33				
1994–95	4th (Amateur League)	1	30	23	4	3	60	17	73	1/64 finals	-	-	Admitted to Second League
1995–96	3rd "A" (Second League)	4	40	22	9	9	60	35	75	1/32 finals	-	-	-
1996–97	3rd "A" (Second League)	4	30	15	11	4	34	17	56	1/32 finals Phase II	-	-	-
1997–98	3rd "C" (Second League)	5	30	15	7	8	47	28	52	1/128 finals	-	-	-
1998–99	3rd "C" (Second League)	1	26	20	4	2	45	18	64	1/64 finals	-	-	Promoted
1999-00	2nd (First League)	16	34	5	12	17	23	52	27	1/16 finals	-	-	Relegated
2000–01	3rd "B" (Second League)	1	28	21	4	3	51	14	67	1/4 finals 2nd League Cup	-	-	Promoted
2001–02	2nd (First League)	3	34	18	8	8	49	26	62	1/8 finals	-	-	Promoted
2002–03	1st (Vyshcha Liha)	14	30	7	7	16	32	45	28	1/8 finals	-	-	-
2003–04	1st (Vyshcha Liha)	6	30	11	8	11	34	35	41	1/8 finals	-	-	-
2004–05	1st (Vyshcha Liha)	15	30	4	9	17	18	43	21	1/16 finals	-	-	Relegated
2005–06	2nd (First League)	3	34	22	6	6	51	19	72	1/32 finals	-	-	-
2006–07	2nd (First League)	3	36	23	4	9	47	27	73	1/16 finals	-	-	-
2007–08	2nd (First League)	3	38	22	6	10	67	42	72	1/32 finals	-	-	-
2008–09	2nd (First League)	2	32	19	6	7	74	40	63	1/8 finals	-	-	Promoted
2009–10	1st (Premier Liha)	11	30	9	4	17	26	50	31	1/4 finals	-	-	-
2010–11	1st (Premier Liha)	10	30	9	7	14	26	38	34	1/16 finals	-	-	-
2011–12	1st (Premier Liha)	15	30	4	9	17	17	42	21	1/16 finals	-	-	Relegated
2012–13	2nd (First League)	17	34	5	7	22	19	28	22	1/16 finals	-	-	Withdrew
As FC Obolon-Brovar Kyiv (2013–2020)
2013	4th (Amateur League)	6	10	1	4	5	4	5	7	-	-	-	Promoted
2013–14	3rd (Second League)	8	36	16	12	8	51	34	60	1/32 finals	-	-	-
2014–15	3rd (Second League)	2	27	20	4	3	46	19	64	1/16 finals	-	-	Promoted
2015–16	2nd (First League)	3	30	16	6	8	45	35	51	1/8 finals	-	-	-
2016–17	2nd (First League)	9	34	12	9	13	37	37	45	1/8 finals	-	-	-
2017–18	2nd (First League)	14	34	9	8	17	24	37	35	1/32 finals	-	-	-
2018–19	2nd (First League)	6	28	13	8	7	35	28	47	1/32 finals	-	-	-
2019–20	2nd (First League)	6	30	14	9	7	40	31	51	1/16 finals	-	-	-
As Obolon Kyiv (2020– )
2020–21	2nd (First League)	8	30	13	4	13	44	35	43	1/32 finals	-	-	-
2021–22was terminated	2nd (First League)	4	19/30	10	3	6	24	16	33	1/16 finals	-	-	began on 24.02.2022 Russian invasion of Ukraine
2022–23	2nd (First League)	2	14	9	2	3	20	9	29	Not played			to Promotion group
2022–23	2nd (First League)	2	14	8	5	1	19	8	29	Not played			Promoted
2023–24	1st (Premier Liha)	14	30	5	11	14	18	41	26	1/4 finals	-	-	Relegation play-offs: Livyi Bereh Kyiv 1:0/1:1 (2-1)
2024–25	1st (Premier Liha)	11	30	8	8	14	19	43	32	Round of 16 (1/8)	-	-	-
2025–26	1st (Premier Liha)	12	30	7	10	13	28	49	31	Round of 64 (1/32)	-	-	-
2026–27	1st (Premier Liha)	10	3	0	2	1	0	3	2	Round of 64 (1/32)	-	-	TBD

== Current squad ==
As of 8 September 2026 Note: Flags indicate national team as defined under FIFA eligibility rules; some limited exceptions apply. Players may hold more than one non-FIFA nationality.

No.	Pos.	Nation	Player
1	GK	UKR	Nazariy Fedorivskyi
2	DF	UKR	Dmytro Kapinus (on loan from Kharkiv)
3	DF	UKR	Vitaliy Yermakov
4	MF	UKR	Taras Moroz
5	DF	UKR	Yevheniy Shevchenko
6	MF	UKR	Maksym Chekh
7	FW	UKR	Andriy Matkevych (on loan from Dynamo Kyiv)
8	MF	UKR	Artem Kulakovskyi
9	FW	UKR	Denys Ustymenko
10	MF	UKR	Oleh Slobodyan (captain)
11	MF	UKR	Maksym Hrysyo
12	GK	UKR	Kyrylo Barantsov
13	FW	UKR	Ihor Medynskyi
14	FW	UKR	Artem Shulyanskyi
15	MF	UKR	Dmytro Myshnyov

No.	Pos.	Nation	Player
17	DF	UKR	Yevheniy Morozko
20	MF	UKR	Roman Volokhatyi
22	DF	UKR	Oleksandr Feshchenko
23	GK	UKR	Vadym Stashkiv
24	DF	UKR	Yehor Prokopenko
28	DF	UKR	Pavlo Polehenko
30	DF	UKR	Kyrylo Prokopchuk
32	DF	UKR	Andriy Lomnytskyi
44	DF	UKR	Oleksandr Zhovtenko
50	MF	UKR	Denys Shostak
55	FW	UKR	Serhiy Sukhanov
70	MF	UKR	Kirill Korkh
90	FW	UKR	Taras Lyakh
99	FW	UKR	Denys Teslyuk

=== Out on loan ===
Note: Flags indicate national team as defined under FIFA eligibility rules; some limited exceptions apply. Players may hold more than one non-FIFA nationality.

No. / Pos. / Nation / Player	No. / Pos. / Nation / Player

== Managers ==
- (Ukraine) Stanislav Honcharenko (Aug 1995 – Oct 1995)
- (Ukraine) Pavlo Neverov (Oct 1995 – June 1997)
- (Ukraine) Vadym Lazorenko (July 1997 – Sept 1999)
- (Ukraine) Oleh Fedorchuk (Sept 1999 – June 2000)
- (Ukraine) Volodymyr Muntyan (Aug 2000 – Nov 2001)
- (Ukraine) Petro Slobodian (March 2002 – Dec 2004)
- (Ukraine) Oleksandr Ryabokon (Jan 2005 – June 2005)
- (Ukraine) Bohdan Blavatskyi (July 2005 – March 2006)
- (Ukraine) Petro Slobodian (April 2006 – May 2008)
- (Ukraine) Ihor Artymovych (caretaker) (May 2008 – June 2008)
- (Ukraine) Yuriy Maksymov (June 2008 – Dec 2009)
- (Ukraine) Serhiy Kovalets (Jan 2010 – Nov 2011)
- (Ukraine) Vasyl Rats (caretaker) (Nov 2011)
- (Ukraine) Serhiy Konyushenko (Nov 2011 – Feb 2013)
- (Russia) Sergei Soldatov (Mar 2013 – 24 Oct 2016)
- (Ukraine) Oleh Mazurenko (24 Oct 2016 – 16 Sep 2017)
- (Ukraine) Valeriy Ivashchenko (caretaker, 19 Sep 2017 – 12 Jan 2018)
- (Ukraine) Volodymyr Pyatenko (12 Jan 2018 – 31 May 2018)
- (Ukraine) Serhiy Kovalets (13 Jun 2018 – 9 Jan 2020)
- (Ukraine) Oleh Mazurenko (13 Jan 2020 – present)
- (Ukraine) Valeriy Ivashchenko (8 July 2020 – 17 Oct 2020)
- (Ukraine) Pavlo Yakovenko (18 Oct 2020 – 5 May 2021)
- (Ukraine) Valeriy Ivashchenko (8 July 2020 – 5 September 2024)
- (Ukraine) Serhiy Shyshchenko (5 September 2024 – 4 June 2025)
- (Ukraine) Oleksandr Antonenko (caretaker, 4 June 2025 – )
