= List of Ukrainian football transfers summer 2025 =

This is a list of Ukrainian football transfers summer 2025

== Ukrainian Premier League ==
=== Dynamo Kyiv ===
In:

No.	Pos.	Nation	Player
—	DF	SEN	Aliou Thiaré (from (France) Le Havre)
—	MF	UKR	Vasyl Burtnyk (Loan from Nyva Ternopil)
—	MF	SUR	Justin Lonwijk (Loan return from (Denmark) Viborg FF)
—	MF	NGR	Shola Ogundana (from (Brazil) Flamengo)
—	FW	ROU	Vladislav Blănuță (from (Poland) U Craiova)

Out:

No.	Pos.	Nation	Player
—	DF	UKR	Maksym Dyachuk (loan to (Poland) Lechia Gdańsk)
—	DF	UKR	Anton Tsarenko (loan to (Poland) Lechia Gdańsk)
—	MF	UKR	Valeriy Luchkevych (Released)
—	MF	UKR	Navin Malysh (Loan to Zorya Luhansk)
—	MF	UKR	Roman Salenko (Loan to Zorya Luhansk)
—	MF	SUR	Justin Lonwijk] (loan to (Netherlands) Fortuna Sittard)
—	MF	UKR	Oleksiy Husiev (loan to Kudrivka)
—	MF	UKR	Maksym Braharu (Loan to Polissya Zhytomyr)
—	MF	UKR	Davyd Bilyi (to Oleksandriya)
—	MF	UKR	Dmytro Kremchanin (to Oleksandriya)
—	MF	UKR	Oleksandr Syrota (Loan to (Turkey) Kocaelispor)
—	FW	UKR	Vladyslav Supryaha (loan to Epitsentr)
—	FW	UKR	Vladyslav Herych (Loan to Chornomorets Odesa)
—	FW	VEN	Eric Ramírez (Loan to (Czech Republic) Bohemians 1905)
—	FW	GEO	Giorgi Tsitaishvili (Loan to (France) Metz)
—	FW	UKR	Vladyslav Vanat (to (Spain) Girona)

=== Epitsentr ===
In:

No.	Pos.	Nation	Player
—	GK	UKR	Arseniy Vavshko (from Kolos-2 Kovalivka)
—	DF	ESP	Jon Ceberio (from (Spain) CD Lugo)
—	DF	UKR	Denis Yanakov (from Chornomorets Odesa)
—	DF	UKR	Ihor Kyryukhantsev (from Zorya Luhansk)
—	MF	UKR	Artem Sitalo (from Inhulets Petrove)
—	MF	BRA	Geovane (from (Portugal) Portimonense)
—	FW	UKR	Vadym Sydun (from Karpaty Lviv)
—	FW	UKR	Andriy Boryachuk (from Metalist 1925 Kharkiv)
—	FW	UKR	Vladyslav Supryaha (loan from Dynamo Kyiv)
—	FW	ESP	Joaquinete (from (Andorra) Santa Coloma)

Out:

No.	Pos.	Nation	Player
—	GK	UKR	Roman Zhmurko (to Livyi Bereh Kyiv)
—	DF	UKR	Oleksandr Zhmuyda (to Prykarpattia Ivano-Frankivsk)
—	MF	UKR	Mykola Myronyuk (Released)
—	MF	UKR	Maksym Protsiv (to Prykarpattia Ivano-Frankivsk)
—	FW	UKR	Ivan Demydenko (Released)
—	FW	UKR	Danylo Kravchuk (to LNZ Cherkasy)

=== Karpaty Lviv ===
In:

No.	Pos.	Nation	Player
—	GK	UKR	Roman Mysak (from Kolos Kovalivka)
—	GK	UKR	Andriy Klishchuk (from Kryvbas Kryvyi Rih)
—	DF	BRA	Jean Pedroso (from (Brazil) Coritiba)
—	MF	BRA	Bruninho (from (Brazil) Clube Atlético Mineiro)
—	FW	UKR	Yaroslav Karabin (from Rukh Lviv)
—	FW	BRA	Paulo Vitor (from (Portugal) Portimonense)

Out:

No.	Pos.	Nation	Player
—	GK	UKR	Yakiv Kinareykin (to (Spain) Villarreal B)
—	GK	UKR	Oleksandr Ilyushchenkov (Released)
—	GK	UKR	Oleksandr Kemkin (Loan to Kryvbas Kryvyi Rih)
—	DF	UKR	Bohdan Veklyak (to FC Kudrivka)
—	MF	UKR	Taras Sakiv (to Bukovyna Chernivtsi)
—	MF	UKR	Orest Kuzyk (Released)
—	MF	UKR	Maksym Chekh (to Obolon Kyiv)
—	MF	UKR	Yevhen Pidlepenets (to Bukovyna Chernivtsi)
—	MF	UKR	Oleh Ocheretko (Loan return to Shakhtar Donetsk)

=== Kolos Kovalivka ===
In:

No.	Pos.	Nation	Player
—	GK	UKR	Dmytro Matsapura (from Zorya Luhansk)
—	GK	UKR	Tymur Puzankov (Loan from Shakhtar Donetsk)
—	DF	MLI	Ibrahim Kane (from Vorskla Poltava)
—	MF	UKR	Andriy Ponyedyelnik (from Kryvbas Kryvyi Rih)
—	MF	UKR	Yuriy Klymchuk (from Rukh Lviv)
—	MF	KOS	Albin Krasniqi (from (Kosovo) Prishtina)
—	MF	GEO	Zurab Rukhadze (from (Georgia (country)) Dila Gori)
—	FW	NGR	Mathias Oyewusi (from (France) Valenciennes)

Out:

No.	Pos.	Nation	Player
—	GK	UKR	Roman Mysak (to Karpaty Lviv)
—	GK	UKR	Valentyn Horokh (to Veres Rivne)
—	DF	UKR	Tymofiy Sukhar (to Chornomorets Odesa)
—	DF	UKR	Vladyslav Yemets (Released)
—	MF	UKR	Pavlo Orikhovskyi (Released)
—	MF	UKR	Oleksiy Sydorov (Loan return to Metalist 1925 Kharkiv)
—	MF	UKR	Oleh Kryvoruchko (Loan to Livyi Bereh Kyiv)
—	MF	LTU	Gytis Paulauskas (to (Slovakia) Zemplín)
—	FW	UKR	Mykola Kovtalyuk (to (Romania) FC Botoșani)

=== Kryvbas Kryvyi Rih ===
In:

No.	Pos.	Nation	Player
—	GK	UKR	Oleksandr Kemkin (Loan from Karpaty Lviv)
—	DF	BRA	Thiago Borges (from (Brazil) América Futebol Clube U20)
—	MF	ISR	Bar Lin (Loan from (Israel) Maccabi Tel Aviv)
—	MF	CRO	Ante Bekavac (From (Bosnia and Herzegovina) HŠK Posušje)
—	MF	UKR	Klim Prykhodko (Loan return from Livyi Bereh Kyiv)
—	MF	VEN	Carlos Rojas (Loan from (Venezuela) Deportivo La Guaira)
—	MF	VEN	Andrusw Araujo (Loan from (Venezuela) Deportivo Rayo Zuliano)
—	FW	NGR	Oche Ochowechi (loan return from (Azerbaijan) Gabala)
—	FW	VEN	Carlos Paraco (from (Venezuela) Metropolitanos)

Out:

No.	Pos.	Nation	Player
—	GK	UKR	Andriy Klishchuk (to Karpaty Lviv)
—	MF	UKR	Volodymyr Yakimets (Released)
—	MF	NIG	Daniel Sosah (to (Kazakhstan) Aktobe)
—	MF	UKR	Dmytro Khomchenovskyi (Released)
—	MF	UKR	Maksym Lunyov (Released)
—	MF	UKR	Yuriy Vakulko (to (Kazakhstan) Ordabasy)
—	MF	UKR	Andriy Ponyedyelnik (to Kolos Kovalivka)
—	MF	UKR	Denys Kuzyk (to LNZ Cherkasy)
—	MF	NGR	Clement Ikenna (loan return to (Bulgaria) Levski Sofia)
—	MF	UKR	Oleksandr Romanchuk (to (Romania) Universitatea Craiova)
—	MF	BRA	Matteo Amoroso (Loan to (Moldova) Zimbru)
—	MF	CRO	Hrvoje Ilić (Released)

=== Kudrivka ===
In:

No.	Pos.	Nation	Player
—	GK	UKR	Illya Karavashchenko (from Livyi Bereh Kyiv)
—	GK	UKR	Mykhaylo Kulyk (from Veres Rivne)
—	DF	UKR	Denys Nahnoynyi (on loan from Metalist 1925 Kharkiv)
—	DF	UKR	Oleksiy Husiev (on loan from Dynamo Kyiv)
—	DF	UKR	Vladyslav Shapoval (from Livyi Bereh Kyiv)
—	MF	UKR	Yevheniy Morozko (Free Agent)
—	MF	UKR	Bohdan Veklyak (from Karpaty Lviv)
—	MF	UKR	Ivan Losenko (Loan from Shakhtar Donetsk)
—	MF	UKR	Oleh Pushkaryov (Loan from Shakhtar Donetsk)
—	MF	UKR	Anton Demchenko (Loan from Mynai)
—	MF	UKR	Andriy Totovytskyi (from Shakhtar Donetsk)
—	FW	GHA	Raymond Owusu (Loan from Metalist 1925 Kharkiv)
—	FW	UKR	Denys Bezborodko (from Chornomorets Odesa)

Out:

No.	Pos.	Nation	Player
—	GK	UKR	Illya Karavashchenko (Loan to Lisne)
—	DF	UKR	Oleksandr Nikolyshyn (to Podillya Khmelnytskyi)
—	DF	UKR	Mykyta Teplyakov (Released)
—	DF	UKR	Roman Hahun (to Feniks-Mariupol)
—	MF	UKR	Mykhaylo Shershen (To Vorskla Poltava)
—	MF	UKR	Ivan Melnychenko (Loan to Lokomotyv Kyiv)
—	MF	UKR	Mykola Vechurko (Loan to Chaika)
—	FW	UKR	Oleksandr Yevtushenko (Released)

=== LNZ Cherkasy ===
In:

No.	Pos.	Nation	Player
—	GK	UKR	Dmytro Ledviy (from Rukh Lviv)
—	GK	UKR	Oleksiy Palamarchuk (from Inhulets Petrove)
—	DF	UKR	Roman Didyk (from Rukh Lviv)
—	DF	UKR	Oleh Horin (from Rukh Lviv)
—	MF	CRC	Jewison Bennette (from (England) Sunderland)
—	MF	UKR	Denys Kuzyk (from Kryvbas Kryvyi Rih)
—	MF	UKR	Artur Ryabov (from Rukh Lviv)
—	MF	UKR	Yuriy Tlumak (to Rukh Lviv)
—	MF	NGR	Prosper Obah (from (Portugal) Vizela)
—	FW	UKR	Danylo Kravchuk (from Epitsentr Kamianets-Podilskyi)

Out:

No.	Pos.	Nation	Player
—	GK	UKR	Yevhen Kucherenko (to (Scotland) Dundee United)
—	GK	UKR	Herman Penkov (to Bukovyna Chernivtsi)
—	MF	LUX	Olivier Thill (to (Luxembourg) Progrès Niederkorn)
—	MF	UKR	Vitaliy Boyko (to Veres Rivne)
—	MF	ISR	Arad Bar (Released)
—	MF	KOS	Hajdin Salihu (Loan to (Poland) Polonia Warsaw)
—	MF	UKR	Bohdan Kushnirenko (Released)
—	MF	NGR	Francis Momoh (Released)
—	FW	UKR	Vladyslav Naumets (to (Kazakhstan) Ordabasy)
—	FW	UKR	Oleksandr Yakymenko (Released)
—	FW	ISR	Osama Khalaila (to (Israel) Hapoel Acre)
—	FW	CMR	Mollo Bessala (Loan to (Moldova) Sheriff Tiraspol)
—	FW	CGO	Béni Makouana (Loan return to Polissya Zhytomyr)

=== Metalist 1925 Kharkiv ===
In:

No.	Pos.	Nation	Player
—	DF	UKR	Illya Krupskyi (Loan return from Vorskla Poltava)
—	DF	UKR	Oleksandr Martynyuk (from Oleksandriya)
—	DF	UKR	Artem Shabanov (from Oleksandriya)
—	MF	UKR	Denys Antyukh (from Zorya Luhansk)
—	MF	UKR	Yevhen Pavlyuk (from Vorskla Poltava)
—	MF	UKR	Oleksiy Sydorov (Loan return to Kolos Kovalivka)
—	MF	KOS	Baton Zabërgja (from (Albania) Dinamo City)

Out:

No.	Pos.	Nation	Player
—	DF	UKR	Oleksandr Chornomorets (Loan return to Vorskla Poltava)
—	DF	UKR	Denys Nahnoynyi (loan to Kudrivka)
—	MF	UKR	Maksym Zhychykov (Released)
—	MF	UKR	Igor Kurylo (Released)
—	MF	UKR	Andriy Boryachuk (to Epitsentr)
—	FW	UKR	Andriy Chyruk (Released)
—	FW	UKR	Serhiy Sten (to Veres Rivne)

=== Obolon Kyiv ===
In:

No.	Pos.	Nation	Player
—	GK	UKR	Vitaliy Chebotaryov (Free Agent)
—	GK	UKR	Vadym Stashkiv (from Livyi Bereh Kyiv)
—	DF	UKR	Dmytro Semenov (from Livyi Bereh Kyiv)
—	MF	UKR	Ivan Nesterenko (from Vorskla Poltava)
—	MF	UKR	Yevheniy Shevchenko (from Veres Rivne)
—	MF	UKR	Yevhen Pasich (Loan from Metalist 1925 Kharkiv)
—	MF	UKR	Maksym Chekh (from Karpaty Lviv)
—	MF	UKR	Artem Kulakovskyi (from Vorskla Poltava)

Out:

No.	Pos.	Nation	Player
—	GK	UKR	Oleksandr Rybka (retired)

=== Oleksandriya ===
In:

No.	Pos.	Nation	Player
—	DF	BRA	Fernando Henrique (from (Brazil) Cruzeiro)
—	MF	CIV	Jocelin Behiratche (from (Moldova) Sheriff Tiraspol)
—	MF	BRA	Mateus Amaral (from (Brazil) São Paulo U20)
—	MF	BRA	Jhonnatan Silva (from (Brazil) América Futebol Clube U20)
—	MF	FRA	Hussayn Touati (from (Switzerland) Neuchâtel Xamax)
—	FW	POR	Jota Pereira (from (Portugal) Sanjoanense)

Out:

No.	Pos.	Nation	Player
—	GK	UKR	Heorhiy Yermakov (to (Israel) Maccabi Haifa)
—	DF	UKR	Oleksandr Martynyuk (to Metalist 1925 Kharkiv)
—	DF	UKR	Serhiy Lohinov (Released)
—	DF	UKR	Artem Shabanov (to Metalist 1925 Kharkiv)
—	MF	UKR	Yuriy Kopyna (to Rukh Lviv)
—	MF	UKR	Volodymyr Shepelyev (Released)
—	MF	UKR	Ivan Kalyuzhnyi (to Metalist 1925 Kharkiv)
—	MF	UKR	Mykyta Kravchenko (to Polissya Zhytomyr)
—	MF	BRA	Juan Alvina (to (Egypt) Zamalek)
—	MF	UKR	Oleksandr Byelyayev (Released)
—	FW	BRA	Geovani (to (South Korea) Daegu)
—	FW	UKR	Oleksandr Filippov (to Polissya Zhytomyr)

=== Polissya Zhytomyr ===
In:

No.	Pos.	Nation	Player
—	GK	UKR	Heorhiy Bushchan (on loan from (Saudi Arabia) Al-Shabab)
—	MF	UKR	Volodymyr Shepelyev (Free Agent)
—	MF	UKR	Mykyta Kravchenko (from Oleksandriya)
—	MF	UKR	Maksym Braharu (Loan from Dynamo Kyiv)
—	FW	UKR	Mykola Hayduchyk (from Veres Rivne)
—	FW	UKR	Oleksandr Filippov (from Oleksandriya)
—	FW	CGO	Béni Makouana (Loan return from LNZ Cherkasy)
—	FW	BRA	Wendell (loan return from Veres Rivne)

Out:

No.	Pos.	Nation	Player
—	FW	URU	Facundo Batista (to (Colombia) Atlético Nacional)
—	FW	BRA	Wendell (to (Estonia) Levadia Tallinn)

=== SC Poltava ===
In:

No.	Pos.	Nation	Player
—	GK	UKR	Daniil Yermolov (from Vorskla Poltava)
—	GK	UKR	Mykyta Minchev (from Ahrobiznes Volochysk)
—	DF	UKR	Oleh Veremiyenko (from Podillya Khmelnytskyi)
—	MF	UKR	Artem Onishchenko (from Olimpiya Savyntsi)
—	MF	UKR	Oleksiy Khakhlyov (from Zorya Luhansk)

Out:

No.	Pos.	Nation	Player
—	GK	UKR	Bohdan Vasetskyi (to Vorskla Poltava)
—	MF	UKR	Denys Chervinskyi (to Metalurh Zaporizhzhia)
—	MF	UKR	Bohdan Shmyhelskyi (to Ahrobiznes Volochysk)
—	MF	UKR	Volodymyr Tymenko (Released)

=== Rukh Lviv ===
In:

No.	Pos.	Nation	Player
—	MF	MDA	Vlad Reilanu (from (Moldova) Zimbru Chișinău)
—	MF	UKR	Yuriy Kopyna (from FC Oleksandriya)
—	FW	UKR	Illya Kvasnytsya (Loan return from Karpaty Lviv)

Out:

No.	Pos.	Nation	Player
—	GK	UKR	Dmytro Ledviy (to LNZ Cherkasy)
—	DF	UKR	Oleh Horin (to LNZ Cherkasy)
—	DF	UKR	Roman Didyk (to LNZ Cherkasy)
—	MF	UKR	Yuriy Klymchuk (to Kolos Kovalivka)
—	MF	UKR	Artur Ryabov (to LNZ Cherkasy)
—	FW	UKR	Yaroslav Karabin (to Karpaty Lviv)
—	FW	UKR	Vladyslav Pohorilyi (Released)
—	FW	UKR	Yevheniy Pastukh (Released)
—	FW	UKR	Artur Remenyak (to Feniks-Mariupol)

=== Shakhtar Donetsk ===
In:

No.	Pos.	Nation	Player
—	DF	BRA	Marlon (from (United States) Los Angeles FC)
—	MF	GEO	Giorgi Gocholeishvili (Loan return from (Denmark) Copenhagen)

Out:

No.	Pos.	Nation	Player
—	MF	ISR	Stav Lemkin (to (Netherlands) Twente)
—	MF	UKR	Ivan Losenko (on loan to FC Kudrivka)
—	MF	UKR	Oleh Pushkaryov (on loan to FC Kudrivka)
—	MF	UKR	Kyrylo Siheyev (Loan to (Slovenia) Tatran Prešov)
—	MF	BRA	Kevin (Loan to (England) Fulham)

=== Veres Rivne ===
In:

No.	Pos.	Nation	Player
—	GK	UKR	Valentyn Horokh (from Kolos Kovalivka)
—	DF	UKR	Serhiy Korniychuk (Loan from Polissya Zhytomyr)
—	MF	UKR	Vitaliy Boyko (from LNZ Cherkasy)
—	MF	GRE	Konstantinos Stamoulis (from (Cyprus) Anorthosis Famagusta)
—	MF	UKR	Denys Ndukve (on loan from Vorskla Poltava)
—	MF	SLO	Kai Cipot (from (Slovenia) Mura)
—	MF	TUR	Eren Aydın (Loan return from (Turkey) Galatasaray)
—	FW	MNE	Marko Mrvaljević (Loan return from (Poland) ŁKS Łódź)
—	FW	UKR	Ignat Pushkutsa (from Metalist 1925-2 Kharkiv)
—	FW	UKR	Serhiy Sten (from Metalist 1925 Kharkiv)
—	FW	GAM	Alagie Wally (from (The Gambia) Hawks)
—	FW	BRA	Wesley (from (Brazil) Coritiba)

Out:

No.	Pos.	Nation	Player
—	GK	UKR	Bohdan Kohut (Released)
—	GK	UKR	Mykhaylo Kulyk (to Kudrivka)
—	MF	UKR	Vasyl Hakman (to Bukovyna Chernivtsi)
—	MF	UKR	Vitaliy Dakhnovskyi (to Bukovyna Chernivtsi)
—	FW	BRA	Wendell (loan return to Polissya Zhytomyr)
—	FW	UKR	Roman Kovalyuk (Released)
—	FW	UKR	Ruslan Stepanyuk (Released)
—	FW	UKR	Orest Lepskyi (Released)
—	FW	UKR	Mykola Hayduchyk (to Polissya Zhytomyr)
—	FW	BRA	Wendell (loan return to Polissya Zhytomyr)

=== Zorya Luhansk ===
In:

No.	Pos.	Nation	Player
—	DF	BIH	Andrija Janjic (From (Bosnia and Herzegovina) Radnik Bijeljina)
—	DF	UKR	Ihor Perduta (From Vorskla Poltava)
—	MF	UKR	Roman Salenko (Loan from Dynamo Kyiv)
—	MF	UKR	Navin Malysh (Loan from Dynamo Kyiv)
—	FW	UKR	Artem Slesar (From Dynamo Kyiv)
—	FW	BRA	Ruan Oliveira (From (Brazil) Metropolitano)

Out:

No.	Pos.	Nation	Player
—	DF	SLO	Žan Trontelj (loan to (Croatia) Gorica)
—	MF	UKR	Kyrylo Dryshlyuk (Released)
—	MF	UKR	Oleksiy Khakhlyov (to Poltava)
—	MF	UKR	Illya Hulko (Released)

== Ukrainian First League ==
=== Ahrobiznes Volochysk ===
In:

No.	Pos.	Nation	Player
—	GK	UKR	Ihor Potimkov (from Metalist 1925 Kharkiv)
—	DF	UKR	Andriy Bogoslavskyy
—	DF	UKR	Serhiy Palyukh (from Mariupol)
—	MF	UKR	Danylo Basovskyi (from Vilkhivtsi)
—	MF	UKR	Bohdan Shmyhelskyi (from Poltavak)
—	FW	UKR	Vyacheslav Studenko (from Hirnyk-Sport Horishni Plavni)

Out:

No.	Pos.	Nation	Player
—	MF	UKR	Dmytro Kasimov (Released)
—	FW	UKR	Taras Puchkovskyi (Retired)

=== Bukovyna Chernivtsi ===
In:

No.	Pos.	Nation	Player
—	GK	UKR	Nikita Fedotov (from UCSA)
—	GK	UKR	Herman Penkov (from LNZ Cherkasy)
—	DF	UKR	Petro Stasyuk (from LNZ Cherkasy)
—	DF	UKR	Vadym Vitenchuk (from Obolon Kyiv)
—	MF	UKR	Danylo Karas (from Obolon Kyiv)
—	MF	UKR	Vitaliy Hrusha (from Obolon Kyiv)
—	MF	UKR	Taras Sakiv (from Karpaty Lviv)
—	MF	UKR	Yevhen Pidlepenets (from Karpaty Lviv)
—	MF	UKR	Vitaliy Dakhnovskyi (from Veres Rivne)
—	MF	UKR	Vasyl Hakman (from Veres Rivne)

Out:

No.	Pos.	Nation	Player Vitaliy Dakhnovskyi
—	GK	UKR	Ivan Ponomarenko (to Podillia Khmelnytskyi)
—	DF	UKR	Ihor Soldat (Released)
—	DF	UKR	Maksym Lopyryonok (Released)
—	MF	UKR	Vladyslav Khamelyuk (Released)
—	MF	UKR	Roman Bodnya (Released)
—	MF	UKR	Oleksandr Vasylyev (Released)

=== FC Chernihiv ===
In:

No.	Pos.	Nation	Player
—	DF	UKR	Nikita Terrekhovets (From Chernihiv U-19)
—	MF	UKR	Maksym Serdyuk (From Livyi Bereh Kyiv)
—	MF	UKR	Andriy Stolyarchuk (Free Agent)
—	MF	UKR	Dmytro Didok (From Chernihiv U-19)
—	MF	UKR	Nikita Dorosh (Loan from Rukh Lviv)
—	MF	UKR	Vladyslav Chaban (Loan from Inhulets Petrove)

Out:

No.	Pos.	Nation	Player
—	MF	UKR	Vitaliy Mentey (Released)
—	MF	UKR	Nikita Posmashnyi (Released)
—	MF	UKR	Dmytro Sakhno (Released)

=== FC Chornomorets Odesa ===
In:

No.	Pos.	Nation	Player
—	GK	UKR	Vadym Yushchyshyn (from Vorskla Poltava)
—	DF	UKR	Yevhen Khacheridi (Free Agent)
—	DF	UKR	Oleksandr Osman (from Obolon Kyiv)
—	DF	UKR	Tymofiy Sukhar (from Kolos Kovalivka)
—	MF	UKR	Ivan Kohut (from Livyi Bereh Kyiv)
—	MF	UKR	Mykola Kohut (from Livyi Bereh Kyiv)
—	MF	UKR	Yuriy Romanyuk (from Prykarpattia Ivano-Frankivsk)
—	MF	UKR	Rostyslav Rusyn (from Metalist 1925 Kharkiv)
—	MF	UKR	Oleksandr Sklyar (from Vorskla Poltava)
—	MF	GAM	Muhammed Jobe (from Polissya-2 Zhytomyr)
—	FW	UKR	Vladyslav Kulach (from Vorskla Poltava)
—	FW	UKR	Yevheniy Ryazantsev (from Mynai)

Out:

No.	Pos.	Nation	Player
—	MF	UKR	Bohdan Butko (Released)

=== Inhulets Petrove ===
In:

No.	Pos.	Nation	Player
—	MF	UKR	Dmytro Kasimov (Free Agent)

Out:

No.	Pos.	Nation	Player
—	GK	UKR	Oleksiy Palamarchuk (to LNZ Cherkasy)
—	MF	UKR	Artem Sitalo (to Epitsentr)

=== FC Livyi Bereh Kyiv ===
In:

No.	Pos.	Nation	Player
—	GK	UKR	Roman Zhmurko (from Epitsentr Kamianets-Podilskyi)
—	GK	UKR	Oleksandr Domolega (from Vorskla Poltava)
—	DF	UKR	Volodymyr Shvets (Loan return from Podillya Khmelnytskyi)
—	MF	UKR	Maksym Serdyuk (Loan return from Chernihiv)
—	MF	UKR	Nazariy Vorobchak (from Mynai)
—	MF	UKR	Bohdan Chuyev (from Mynai)
—	MF	UKR	Simon Haloyan (from Oleksandriya-2)
—	MF	UKR	Oleh Kryvoruchko (Loan from Kolos Kovalivka)
—	FW	UKR	Yehor Hunichev (from Mynai)

Out:

No.	Pos.	Nation	Player
—	GK	UKR	Illya Karavashchenko (to FC Kudrivka)
—	GK	UKR	Vadym Stashkiv (to Obolon Kyiv)
—	DF	UKR	Dmytro Semenov (to Obolon Kyiv)
—	MF	UKR	Maksym Serdyuk (Released)
—	MF	UKR	Vladyslav Shapoval (to Kudrivka)
—	MF	UKR	Ivan Kohut (to Chornomorets Odesa)
—	MF	UKR	Mykola Kohut (to Chornomorets Odesa)
—	MF	UKR	Maksym Serdyuk (Released)
—	MF	UKR	Klim Prykhodko (Loan return to Kryvbas Kryvyi Rih)
—	FW	UKR	Vladyslav Voytsekhovskyi (Released)

=== Feniks-Mariupol ===
In:

No.	Pos.	Nation	Player
—	DF	UKR	Roman Hahun (from Kudrivka)

Out:

No.	Pos.	Nation	Player

=== Metalist Kharkiv ===
In:

No.	Pos.	Nation	Player

Out:

No.	Pos.	Nation	Player

=== Mynai ===
In:

No.	Pos.	Nation	Player

Out:

No.	Pos.	Nation	Player
—	DF	UKR	Bohdan Chuyev (to Livyi Bereh Kyiv)
—	DF	UKR	Taras Dmytruk (Released)
—	MF	UKR	Nazariy Vorobchak (to Livyi Bereh Kyiv)

=== Nyva Ternopil ===
In:

No.	Pos.	Nation	Player

Out:

No.	Pos.	Nation	Player
—	DF	UKR	Arsen Slotyuk (Released)

=== Podillya Khmelnytskyi ===
In:

No.	Pos.	Nation	Player
—	GK	UKR	Ivan Ponomarenko (from Bukovyna Chernivtsi)
—	DF	UKR	Yevhen Korokhov (from Viktoriya Sumy)
—	MF	UKR	Volodymyr Rudyuk (from Prykarpattia Ivano-Frankivsk)

Out:

No.	Pos.	Nation	Player
—	DF	UKR	Volodymyr Shvets (Loan return to Livyi Bereh Kyiv)
—	DF	UKR	Oleh Veremiyenko (to Poltava)
—	MF	UKR	Vladyslav Chushenko (to Prykarpattia Ivano-Frankivsk)

=== Probiy Horodenka ===
In:

No.	Pos.	Nation	Player

Out:

No.	Pos.	Nation	Player

=== Prykarpattia Ivano-Frankivsk ===
In:

No.	Pos.	Nation	Player
—	GK	UKR	Vladyslav Gumenyuk (From Metalist 1925-2 Kharkiv)
—	DF	UKR	Oleksandr Zhmuyda (From Epitsentr Kamianets-Podilskyi)
—	MF	UKR	Vladyslav Chushenko (From Podillya Khmelnytskyi)
—	MF	UKR	Maksym Protsiv (From Epitsentr Kamianets-Podilskyi)
—	MF	UKR	Nazar Prykhodko (From Dinaz Vyshhorod)
—	MF	UKR	Dmytro Makotyak

Out:

No.	Pos.	Nation	Player
—	GK	UKR	Vladyslav Kucheruk (Released)
—	DF	UKR	Valeriy Boldenkov (Released)

=== UCSA Tarasivka ===
In:

No.	Pos.	Nation	Player
—	DF	UKR	Oleksii Zhdanovych (from Kremin)
—	MF	UKR	Sergiy Lebedev (from Oleksandriya-2)
—	MF	UKR	Danylo Sydorenko (from Kremin)

Out:

No.	Pos.	Nation	Player
—	GK	UKR	Nikita Fedotov (from Bukovyna Chernivtsi)
—	DF	UKR	Andriy Spivakov (Released)
—	DF	UKR	Oleksiy Zozulya (Retired)
—	DF	UKR	Yevhen Selin (to Avanhard Lozova)

=== Viktoriya Sumy ===
In:

No.	Pos.	Nation	Player

Out:

No.	Pos.	Nation	Player
—	DF	UKR	Yevhen Korokhov (to Podillya Khmelnytskyi)

=== Vorskla Poltava ===
In:

No.	Pos.	Nation	Player
—	MF	UKR	Mykhaylo Shershen (From Kudrivka)

Out:

No.	Pos.	Nation	Player
—	GK	UKR	Pavlo Isenko (to (Romania) Universitatea Craiova)
—	GK	UKR	Daniil Yermolov (to Poltava)
—	GK	UKR	Vadym Yushchyshyn (to Chornomorets Odesa)
—	GK	UKR	Oleksandr Domolega (to Livyi Bereh Kyiv)
—	DF	MLI	Ibrahim Kane (to Kolos Kovalivka)
—	DF	UKR	Ihor Perduta (Released)
—	DF	UKR	Illya Krupskyi (Loan return to Vorskla Poltava)
—	MF	KOS	Milot Avdyli (to (Slovenia) Celje)
—	MF	UKR	Yevhen Pavlyuk (to Metalist 1925 Kharkiv)
—	MF	UKR	Andriy Batsula (to (Kyrgyzstan) Muras United)
—	MF	UKR	Oleksandr Sklyar (Released)
—	MF	SLO	Luka Guček (to (Slovenia) Maribor)
—	MF	UKR	Artem Kulakovskyi (to Obolon Kyiv)

== Ukrainian Second League ==
=== Atlet Kyiv ===
In:

No.	Pos.	Nation	Player

Out:

No.	Pos.	Nation	Player

=== Bukovyna-2 Chernivtsi ===
In:

No.	Pos.	Nation	Player

Out:

No.	Pos.	Nation	Player

=== Chaika Petropavlivska Borshchahivka ===
In:

No.	Pos.	Nation	Player
—	MF	UKR	Mykola Vechurko (Loan from Kudrivka)

Out:

No.	Pos.	Nation	Player
—	GK	UKR	Oleksiy Slutskyi (Released)

=== Chornomorets-2 Odesa ===
In:

No.	Pos.	Nation	Player

Out:

No.	Pos.	Nation	Player

=== Dinaz Vyshhorod ===
In:

No.	Pos.	Nation	Player

Out:

No.	Pos.	Nation	Player
—	MF	UKR	Serhiy Starenkyi (Retired)
—	MF	UKR	Stanislav Morarenko (to (Latvia) Grobiņa)

=== Hirnyk-Sport Horishni Plavni ===
In:

No.	Pos.	Nation	Player

Out:

No.	Pos.	Nation	Player

=== Kolos-2 Kovalivka ===
In:

No.	Pos.	Nation	Player

Out:

No.	Pos.	Nation	Player

=== Kulykiv-Bilka ===
In:

No.	Pos.	Nation	Player
—	GK	UKR	Roman Sherekhora
—	DF	UKR	Nazariy Turko (from Rukh-2 Lviv)
—	MF	UKR	Ilya Popovskyi (from Rukh-2 Lviv)
—	MF	UKR	Dmytro Humenyak (from Revera 1908)
—	MF	UKR	Roman Bodnar
—	MF	UKR	Volodymyr Antonyuk
—	MF	UKR	Mykyta Sharabura (from Probiy Horodenka)
—	MF	UKR	Ivan Stankovych (from Mynai)

Out:

No.	Pos.	Nation	Player
—	GK	UKR	Dmytro Maloid (Released)
—	MF	UKR	Edvard Kobak (Released)

=== Livyi Bereh-2 Kyiv ===
In:

No.	Pos.	Nation	Player

Out:

No.	Pos.	Nation	Player

=== FC Lisne ===
In:

No.	Pos.	Nation	Player
—	GK	UKR	Illya Karavashchenko (Loan from Kudrivka)
—	MF	UKR	Ihor Soldat (Free Agent)
—	MF	UKR	Vladyslav Ohirya (Free Agent)
—	MF	UKR	Vikentiy Voloshyn (From Dynamo Kyiv)

Out:

No.	Pos.	Nation	Player

=== Lokomotyv Kyiv ===
In:

No.	Pos.	Nation	Player
—	MF	UKR	Mykola Syrash (Free Agent)
—	MF	UKR	Ivan Melnychenko (Loan from Kudrivka)

Out:

No.	Pos.	Nation	Player

=== FC Metalurh Zaporizhzhia ===
In:

No.	Pos.	Nation	Player

Out:

No.	Pos.	Nation	Player

=== Nyva Vinnytsia ===
In:

No.	Pos.	Nation	Player
—	DF	UKR	Yevheniy Moroz (from Horishni Plavni)

Out:

No.	Pos.	Nation	Player

=== Oleksandriya-2 ===
In:

No.	Pos.	Nation	Player

Out:

No.	Pos.	Nation	Player
—	MF	UKR	Simon Haloyan (to Livyi Bereh Kyiv)
—	MF	UKR	Sergiy Lebedev (to UCSA)
—	MF	UKR	Danylo Volynets (Released)
—	MF	UKR	Artem Petryk (Released)
—	MF	UKR	Oleksandr Zhadan (Released)

=== Polissya-2 Zhytomyr ===
In:

No.	Pos.	Nation	Player

Out:

No.	Pos.	Nation	Player

=== Penuel Kryvyi Rih ===
In:

No.	Pos.	Nation	Player

Out:

No.	Pos.	Nation	Player

=== Real Pharma Odesa ===
In:

No.	Pos.	Nation	Player

Out:

No.	Pos.	Nation	Player

=== Rebel Kyiv ===
In:

No.	Pos.	Nation	Player

Out:

No.	Pos.	Nation	Player

=== Sambir-Nyva-2 Ternopil ===
In:

No.	Pos.	Nation	Player

Out:

No.	Pos.	Nation	Player

=== Skala 1911 Stryi ===
In:

No.	Pos.	Nation	Player
—	MF	UKR	Oleksandr Fetko (From Karpaty Lviv)

Out:

No.	Pos.	Nation	Player
—	DF	UKR	Oleksandr Rudenko (to Polissya Stavky)

=== Trostianets ===
In:

No.	Pos.	Nation	Player
—	MF	UKR	Heorhii Kovalskyi (From Kremin Kremenchuk)
—	MF	UKR	Serhiy Miserzhy (From Hirnyk-Sport Horishni Plavni)

Out:

No.	Pos.	Nation	Player
—	GK	UKR	Ivan Dubovyi (Loan return to LNZ Cherkasy)
—	MF	UKR	Mykhaylo Serhiychuk (Released)

=== Uzhhorod ===
In:

No.	Pos.	Nation	Player

Out:

No.	Pos.	Nation	Player

=== Vorskla-2 Poltava ===
In:

No.	Pos.	Nation	Player

Out:

No.	Pos.	Nation	Player

=== Vilkhivtsi ===
In:

No.	Pos.	Nation	Player

Out:

No.	Pos.	Nation	Player

== See also ==
- 2025–26 Ukrainian Premier League
- 2025–26 Ukrainian First League
- 2025–26 Ukrainian Second League
- 2025–26 Ukrainian Cup
