= 2024–25 FC Karpaty Lviv season =

Karpaty Lviv
2024–25 season
- President: Stepan Yurchyshyn
- Manager: Vladyslav Lupashko
- Stadium: Ukraina Stadium, Lviv
- Premier League: 6th
- Ukrainian Cup: Round of 16
- Top goalscorer: League: Ambrosiy Chachua (10); All: Ambrosiy Chachua (11)
- Highest home attendance: 6,500 vs Zorya; 25 May 2025
- Lowest home attendance: 0 (ban) vs Vorskla; 31 August 2024

The 2024–25 season was 28th season in the top Ukrainian football league for FC Karpaty Lviv overall and their first since reorganization in 2021. Karpaty were competing in Premier League and Ukrainian Cup.

== Season events ==
On 18 July, during pre-season, Karpaty announced that their head coach Myron Markevych has resigned. Renowned 73 year old Ukrainian manager had left Karpaty for the fifth time in his managerial career. Later in an interview Markevych claimed his resignation was due to differences in vision on club development between him and the president. Markevych desired to compete for European qualification right after getting promoted to the Premier League and demanded more qualified players to achieve that goal, while the president favored more cautious "step-by-step" approach.

On 19 July, Vladyslav Lupashko, the U-19 team's senior coach, was presented as the head coach of the first team ahead of new season.

== Players ==
=== Squad information ===
As of 30 March 2025

Squad no.	Name	Nationality	Position	Date of birth (age)
Goalkeepers
1	Yakiv Kinareykin	(Ukraine)	GK	22 October 2003 (age 23)
31	Oleksandr Ilyushchenkov	(Ukraine)	GK	23 March 1990 (age 36)
35	Oleksandr Kemkin	(Ukraine)	GK	5 August 2002 (age 24)
41	Nazar Domchak	(Ukraine)	GK	6 April 2007 (age 19)
Defenders
3	Volodymyr Adamyuk	(Ukraine)	DF	17 July 1991 (age 35)
4	Vladislav Baboglo	(Moldova)	DF	14 November 1998 (age 27)
5	Andriy Buleza	(Ukraine)	DF	25 January 2004 (age 22)
11	Denys Miroshnichenko	(Ukraine)	DF	11 October 1994 (age 32)
22	Bohdan Veklyak	(Ukraine)	DF	31 August 1999 (age 27)
28	Pavlo Polehenko	(Ukraine)	DF	6 January 1995 (age 31)
39	Vitaliy Katrych	(Ukraine)	DF	17 February 2005 (age 21)
44	Taras Sakiv	(Ukraine)	DF	19 November 1997 (age 28)
47	Jean Pedroso	(Brazil)	DF	28 January 2004 (age 22)
55	Tymur Stetskov	(Ukraine)	DF	27 January 1998 (age 28)
77	Oleksiy Sych	(Ukraine)	DF	1 April 2001 (age 25)
Midfielders
7	Yevhen Pidlepenets	(Ukraine)	MF	10 November 1998 (age 28)
8	Ambrosiy Chachua	(Ukraine)	MF	2 April 1994 (age 32)
9	Fabiano	(Brazil)	MF	15 April 2006 (age 20)
14	Illya Kvasnytsya	(Ukraine)	MF	20 March 2003 (age 23)
17	Oleh Fedor	(Ukraine)	MF	23 July 2004 (age 22)
18	Vladyslav Klymenko	(Ukraine)	MF	19 June 1994 (age 32)
19	Ivan Chaban	(Ukraine)	MF	24 July 2006 (age 20)
20	Oleh Ocheretko	(Ukraine)	MF	25 May 2003 (age 23)
21	Patricio Tanda	(Argentina)	MF	5 April 2002 (age 24)
23	Pablo Álvarez	(Spain)	MF	23 April 1997 (age 29)
26	Yan Kostenko	(Ukraine)	MF	4 July 2003 (age 23)
27	Orest Kuzyk	(Ukraine)	MF	17 May 1995 (age 31)
33	Artur Shakh	(Ukraine)	MF	11 May 2005 (age 21)
37	Bruninho	(Brazil)	MF	27 April 2000 (age 26)
40	Maksym Skorokhod	(Ukraine)	MF	25 March 2005 (age 21)
45	Vladyslav Reznik	(Ukraine)	MF	28 March 2007 (age 19)
Forwards
10	Igor Neves	(Brazil)	FW	13 March 1999 (age 27)
38	Oleksandr Fetko	(Ukraine)	FW	10 February 2005 (age 21)
95	Ihor Krasnopir	(Ukraine)	FW	1 December 2002 (age 23)
Away on loan
30	Vadym Sydun	(Ukraine)	FW	10 February 2005 (age 21)
43	Stênio	(Brazil)	MF	5 April 2003 (age 23)
Players who left during the season
9	Yuriy Tlumak	(Ukraine)	MF	11 July 2002 (age 24)
13	Denys Ustymenko	(Ukraine)	FW	12 April 1999 (age 27)
16	Artur Ryabov	(Ukraine)	MF	20 August 2000 (age 26)
27	Tymofiy Sukhar	(Ukraine)	DF	4 February 1999 (age 27)
29	Maksym Melnychenko	(Ukraine)	MF	12 February 2005 (age 21)
32	Andriy Lomnytskyi	(Ukraine)	DF	3 October 2005 (age 21)

== Transfers ==
=== In ===
Date	Pos.	Player	Age	Moving from	Type	Fee	Source
Summer
12 August 2024	FW	(Ukraine) Denys Ustymenko	25	(Ukraine) Kryvbas Kryvyi Rih	Loan		
6 September 2024	MF	(Brazil) Bruninho	24	(Brazil) Atlético Mineiro	Loan		
Winter
13 January 2025	DF	(Ukraine) Tymur Stetskov	26	(Ukraine) Kryvbas Kryvyi Rih	Transfer	€500,000	
20 January 2025	FW	(Ukraine) Ihor Krasnopir	22	(Ukraine) Rukh Lviv	Transfer	€1,000,000	
20 January 2025	DF	(Ukraine) Oleksiy Sych	23	(Ukraine) Rukh Lviv	Transfer	€1,000,000	
20 January 2025	MF	(Ukraine) Illya Kvasnytsya	21	(Ukraine) Rukh Lviv	Loan		
20 January 2025	MF	(Ukraine) Oleh Fedor	20	(Ukraine) Rukh Lviv	Loan		
23 January 2025	MF	(Argentina) Patricio Tanda	22	(Argentina) Racing	Loan		
12 March 2025	FW	(Brazil) Fabiano	18	(Brazil) Botafogo	Transfer	€70,000	

=== Out ===
Date	Pos.	Player	Age	Moving to	Type	Fee	Source
Summer
6 September 2024	DF	(Ukraine) Andriy Lomnytskyi	18	(Ukraine) Obolon Kyiv	Transfer	Free	
6 September 2024	FW	(Ukraine) Vadym Sydun	19	(Ukraine) Nyva Ternopil	Loan		
7 September 2024	MF	(Ukraine) Maksym Melnychenko	19	(Ukraine) Polissya Zhytomyr	Loan		
Winter
31 December 2024	FW	(Ukraine) Denys Ustymenko	25	(Ukraine) Kryvbas Kryvyi Rih	End of loan		
8 January 2025	DF	(Ukraine) Tymofiy Sukhar	25	(Ukraine) Kolos Kovalivka	Transfer	Free	
10 January 2025	MF	(Ukraine) Maksym Melnychenko	19	(Ukraine) Polissya Zhytomyr	Transfer	€300,000	
21 January 2025	MF	(Ukraine) Artur Ryabov	24	(Ukraine) Rukh Lviv	Transfer	Free	
21 January 2025	MF	(Ukraine) Yuriy Tlumak	22	(Ukraine) Rukh Lviv	Transfer	Free	
28 February 2025	MF	(Brazil) Stênio	21	(Brazil) América Mineiro	Loan		

== Pre-season and friendlies ==
3 July 2024 Friendly	Karpaty Lviv	3–1	FC Mynai	Bartativ
17:00 EEST (UTC+03:00)	Sakiv 24'; Polehenko 65'; Sydun 70'	Report	Hunichev 22'	Stadium: FC Karpaty Training Center

5 July 2024 Friendly	Karpaty Lviv	0–1	Metalist 1925 Kharkiv	Bartativ
17:00 EEST (UTC+03:00)		Report	Sukhar 44' (o.g.)	Stadium: FC Karpaty Training Center

8 July 2024 Friendly	Karpaty Lviv	1–1	Prykarpattia Ivano-Frankivsk	Bartativ
17:00 EEST (UTC+03:00)	Álvarez 43'	Report	Tsyutsyura 39'	Stadium: FC Karpaty Training Center

10 July 2024 Friendly	Karpaty Lviv	1–1	Ahrobiznes Volochysk	Bartativ
17:00 EEST (UTC+03:00)	Shakh 24'	Report	Volkov 30'	Stadium: FC Karpaty Training Center

14 July 2024 Friendly	Karpaty Lviv	2–3	Bukovyna Chernivtsi	Bartativ
16:00 EEST (UTC+03:00)	Kostenko 52'; Kuzyk 60'	Report	Kilyevyi 24'; Andreychuk 27'; Boychuk 58'	Stadium: FC Karpaty Training Center

17 July 2024 Friendly	Karpaty Lviv	3–3	Nyva Ternopil	Bartativ
17:00 EEST (UTC+03:00)	Neves 2' (pen.); Polehenko 15' (pen.); Tlumak 53'	Report	Haladey 5'; Kozak 14'; Riznyk 25' (pen.)	Stadium: FC Karpaty Training Center

27 July 2024 Friendly	Karpaty Lviv	1–0	FC Kulykiv-Bilka	Lviv
	Kostenko 9'			Stadium: Ukraina Stadium; Attendance: 0

8 September 2024 Friendly	Karpaty Lviv	0–1	Veres Rivne	Bartativ
14:15 EEST (UTC+03:00)			Stepanyuk 58'	Stadium: FC Karpaty Training Center

16 November 2024 Friendly	Karpaty Lviv	0–1	Bukovyna Chernivtsi	Bartativ
11:00 EET (UTC+02:00)			Andreychuk 42'	Stadium: FC Karpaty Training Center

24 January 2025 Friendly	Kecskemét (Hungary)	0–3	Karpaty Lviv	Belek, Turkey
11:00 TRT (UTC+03:00)		Report	Miroshnichenko 15'; Shakh 23'; Belényesi 55' (o.g.)	Stadium: Titanic Sports Center

25 January 2025 Friendly	Bohemians 1905 (Czech Republic)	5–2	Karpaty Lviv	Belek, Turkey
11:00 TRT (UTC+03:00)	Ristovski 17'; Matoušek 50'; Kareem 69'; Zeman 81'; Dostál 87'	Report	Krasnopir 45'; Kvasnytsya 68'	Stadium: Titanic Sports Center

31 January 2025 Friendly	Termalica Nieciecza (Poland)	2–1	Karpaty Lviv	Belek, Turkey
11:00 TRT (UTC+03:00)	Zapolnik 4', 59'	Report	Fedor 29'	Stadium: Titanic Sports Center

1 February 2025 Friendly	Željezničar Sarajevo (Bosnia and Herzegovina)	2–3	Karpaty Lviv	Belek, Turkey
15:30 TRT (UTC+03:00)	Cvetanoski 29'; Fočo 90+2'	Report	Krasnopir 6'; Klymenko 15'; Polehenko 90+6'	Stadium: Titanic Sports Center

7 February 2025 Friendly	Dinamo Batumi (Georgia (country))	1–6	Karpaty Lviv	Belek, Turkey
17:00 TRT (UTC+03:00)	Japaridze 21'	Report	Krasnopir 5', 49'; Shakh 23'; Kostenko 59' (pen.), 80'; Tanda 85'	Stadium: Titanic Sports Center

12 February 2025 Friendly	Polissya Zhytomyr	3–0	Karpaty Lviv	Belek, Turkey
15:00 TRT (UTC+03:00)	Yosefi 4'; Krushynskyi 45'; Andriyevskyi 61'	Report

13 February 2025 Friendly	Zimbru Chișinău (Moldova)	1–1	Karpaty Lviv	Belek, Turkey
15:00 TRT (UTC+03:00)	Ordóñez 43'	Report	Pedroso 23'	Stadium: Titanic Sports Center

12 March 2025 Friendly	Karpaty Lviv	1–2	Shakhtar Donetsk	Lviv
12:00 EET (UTC+02:00)	Pidlepenets 1'	Report	Hlushchenko 12'; Elias 82'	Stadium: Ukraina Stadium; Referee: Oleksandr Shandor

23 March 2025 Friendly	Karpaty Lviv	3–0	Nyva Ternopil	Lviv
13:00 EET (UTC+02:00)	Kostenko 76'; Fabiano 86'; Bruninho 90'	Report		Stadium: Ukraina Stadium

== Competitions ==
=== Overall ===
Competition	Record							
Competition	Pld	W	D	L	GF	GA	GD	Win %
Premier League	30	13	7	10	42	36	+6	43.33
Cup	2	1	0	1	3	1	+2	50.00
Total	32	14	7	11	45	37	+8	43.75

Last updated: 25 May 2025
Source: Competitions

=== Premier League ===
==== League table ====
Pos	Team	Pld	W	D	L	GF	GA	GD	Pts	Qualification or relegation
4	Polissya Zhytomyr	30	12	12	6	38	28	+10	48	Qualification for the Conference League second qualifying round
5	Kryvbas Kryvyi Rih	30	13	8	9	34	26	+8	47	
6	Karpaty Lviv	30	13	7	10	42	36	+6	46	
7	Zorya Luhansk	30	12	4	14	34	39	−5	40	
8	Rukh Lviv	30	9	11	10	30	27	+3	38	

Source: upl.ua
Rules for classification: 1) Points; 2) Head-to-head points; 3) Head-to-head goal difference; 4) Head-to-head goals scored; 5) Goal difference; 6) Goals scored; 7) Draw or "Golden match" if two teams tied for title (Article 22, paragraph 3).

Teams that placed 13th and 14th in the 2024–25 Ukrainian Premier League played two-leg play-off with the third and fourth teams of the 2024–25 Ukrainian First League. As a result, both the Ukrainian First League teams (Metalist 1925 and Kudrivka) received promotion after beating the Ukrainian Premier League teams (Vorskla and Livyi Bereh), which in turn were relegated. Due to the Russian 2025 summer escalation and the Russian ballistic missile attack warnings, on 1 June 2025, both matches were suspended but later renewed.

Team 1	Agg.	Team 2	1st leg	2nd leg
Kudrivka	2–2 (4–3 p)	Vorskla Poltava	1–2	1–0
Livyi Bereh Kyiv	0–2	Metalist 1925 Kharkiv	0–1	0–1

=== First Semi-final ===
29 May 2025	Kudrivka	1–2	Vorskla Poltava	Kyiv
15:30	Kozak 83'	Report	Ndukve 23'; Pavlyuk 39'	Stadium: Obolon Arena; Attendance: 1,100; Referee: Dmytro Panchyshyn (Kharkiv)

1 June 2025	Vorskla Poltava	0–1 (3–4 p)	Kudrivka	Poltava
13:00		Report	Lytovchenko 9'	Stadium: Vorskla; Attendance: 2,204; Referee: Mykola Balakin (Kyiv oblast)
	Penalties
	Ndukve (penalty scored); Malysh (penalty scored); Iyede (penalty missed); Kane (penalty missed); Salabay (penalty scored); Sklyar (penalty missed)		(penalty scored) Tuzenko; (penalty missed) Storchous; (penalty scored) Shershen; (penalty scored) Potimkov; (penalty missed) Serdyuk; (penalty scored) Liehostayev

2–2 on aggregate; Kudrivka won 4–3 on penalties and promotion to Premier League. While, Vorskla lost 3–4 on penalties and relegation to First League

=== Second Semi-final ===
29 May 2025	Livyi Bereh Kyiv	0–1	Metalist 1925 Kharkiv	Hnidyn, Kyiv Oblast
18:00		Report	Moura 38'	Stadium: Arena Livyi Bereh; Attendance: 1,167; Referee: Viktor Kopiyevskyi (Kropyvnytskyi)

1 June 2025	Metalist 1925 Kharkiv	1–0	Livyi Bereh Kyiv	Hnidyn, Kyiv Oblast
15:30	Kalitvintsev 90'	Report		Stadium: Arena Livyi Bereh; Attendance: 1,800; Referee: Vitaliy Romanov (Dnipro)

Metalist 1925 Kharkiv won 2–0 on aggregate and promotion to Premier League. While, Livyi Bereh Kyiv lost 0–2 on aggregate and relegation to First League.

==== Results summary ====
Overall								Home						Away					
Pld	W	D	L	GF	GA	GD	Pts	W	D	L	GF	GA	GD	W	D	L	GF	GA	GD
30	13	7	10	42	36	+6	46	9	3	3	27	12	+15	4	4	7	15	24	−9

Last updated: 25 May 2025.
Source: Competitive matches

==== Results by round ====
Round	1	2	3	4	5	6	7	8	9	10	11	12	13	14	15	16	17	18	19	20	21	22	23	24	25	26	27	28	29	30
Ground	A	H	H	A	H	A	A	H	H	A	H	H	A	H	A	H	A	A	H	A	H	H	A	A	H	A	A	H	A	H
Result	D	W	L	L	D	L	W	L	D	W	W	W	L	W	L	W	L	L	W	D	D	W	D	W	W	D	W	W	L	L
Position	7	2	8	10	11	12	10	10	10	8	8	5	7	6	6	6	6	6	6	7	7	6	6	5	5	5	5	4	5	6

Updated to match(es) played on 25 May 2025. Source: Competitive matches
A = Away; H = Home; W = Win; D = Draw; L = Loss

==== Matches ====
3 August 2024 1	Veres Rivne	0–0	Karpaty Lviv	Rivne
15:30 EEST (UTC+03:00)	Sharay (yellow card) 61'; Kucherov (yellow card) 75'	Report	Miroshnichenko (yellow card) 10'; Kostenko (yellow card) 45+3' (yellow-red card) 89'; Álvarez (yellow card) 73'	Stadium: Avanhard Stadium; Attendance: 1,607; Referee: Andriy Kovalenko

11 August 2024 2	Karpaty Lviv	3–0	Kryvbas Kryvyi Rih	Lviv
15:30 EEST (UTC+03:00)	Shakh 39'; Polehenko 42'; Chachua 81'	Report	Lunyov (penalty missed) 19'; Amoroso (yellow card) 48'; Bizimana (yellow card) 59'	Stadium: Ukraina Stadium; Attendance: 3,500; Referee: Oleksiy Derevinskyi

17 August 2024 3	Karpaty Lviv	1–3	Dynamo Kyiv	Lviv
18:00 EEST (UTC+03:00)	Ocheretko 1', (yellow card) 79'	Report	Pikhalyonok 23'; Vanat 58'; Yarmolenko 90+2' (pen.)	Stadium: Ukraina Stadium; Attendance: 6,300; Referee: Viktor Kopiyevskyi

26 August 2024 4	LNZ Cherkasy	2–1	Karpaty Lviv	Cherkasy
19:00 EEST (UTC+03:00)	Bessala (yellow card) 45+2'; Kucherenko (yellow card) 60'; Pasich 61'; Thill (yellow card) 70'; Jashari 76', (yellow card) 88'	Report	Chachua 34'	Stadium: Cherkasy Arena; Attendance: 357; Referee: Oleksandr Omelchenko

31 August 2024 5	Karpaty Lviv	1–1	Vorskla Poltava	Lviv
13:00 EEST (UTC+03:00)	Shakh 15'; Álvarez (yellow card) 25'; Miroshnichenko (yellow card) 84'	Report	Kovtalyuk (yellow card) 54'; Sklyar 57'; Chornomorets (yellow card) 90+2'	Stadium: Ukraina Stadium; Attendance: 0^{[a]} Referee: Volodymyr Novokhatniy

14 September 2024 6	Shakhtar Donetsk	5–2	Karpaty Lviv	Lviv
18:00 EEST (UTC+03:00)	Zubkov 21'; Kryskiv (yellow card) 28'; Bondarenko 29', 39', 65'; Sikan 42'; Pedro Henrique (yellow card) 64'; Kevin (yellow card) 66'	Report	Pidlepenets 25'; Chachua 83'; Miroshnichenko (yellow card) 90+3'	Stadium: Arena Lviv; Attendance: 1,319; Referee: Andriy Kovalenko

21 September 2024 7	Chornomorets Odesa	0–1	Karpaty Lviv	Odesa
13:00 EEST (UTC+03:00)	Udod (yellow card) 18'; Petryak (yellow card) 34'; Siheyev (yellow card) 70'; Pshenychnyuk (yellow card) 84'	Report	Sakiv 52'; Adamyuk (yellow card) 53' (yellow-red card) 64'; Kemkin (yellow card) 89'	Stadium: Chornomorets Stadium; Referee: Dmytro Yevtukhov

28 September 2024 8	Karpaty Lviv	1–3	Polissya Zhytomyr	Lviv
18:00 EEST (UTC+03:00)	Miroshnichenko 19'	Report	Krushynskyi 18', (yellow card) 25'; Hutsulyak 45+1'; Nazarenko 70'	Stadium: Ukraina Stadium; Attendance: 2,200; Referee: Denys Reznikov

4 October 2024 9	Karpaty Lviv	0–0	Inhulets Petrove	Lviv^{[b]}
18:00 EEST (UTC+03:00)	Shakh (yellow card) 73'; Neves (penalty missed) 83'	Report	Sitalo (yellow card) 71'	Stadium: Ukraina Stadium; Attendance: 1,200; Referee: Serhiy Zadyran

21 October 2024 10	Rukh Lviv	0–1	Karpaty Lviv	Lviv
18:00 EEST (UTC+03:00)	Klymchuk (yellow card) 45+1'	Report	Pedroso 43'; Miroshnichenko (yellow card) 45+1'; Shakh (yellow card) 66'	Stadium: Arena Lviv; Attendance: 3,300; Referee: Oleksandr Afanasyev

26 October 2024 11	Karpaty Lviv	1–0	Obolon Kyiv	Lviv
18:00 EEST (UTC+03:00)	Klymenko (yellow card) 8'; Bruninho 10'; Pedroso (yellow card) 14'; Chachua (yellow card) 70'; Ryabov (yellow card) 87'	Report	Vitenchuk (yellow card) 18'; Sukhanov (yellow card) 47'	Stadium: Ukraina Stadium; Attendance: 2,187; Referee: Yevhen Tsybulko

2 November 2024 12	Karpaty Lviv	3–0	Livyi Bereh Kyiv	Lviv
15:30 EET (UTC+02:00)	Pidlepenets 71'; Ocheretko 75' (pen.); Chachua 90+1'	Report	Shapoval (yellow card) 20'; Dedukh (yellow card) 30'	Stadium: Ukraina Stadium; Attendance: 1,450; Referee: Anastasiya Romanyuk

9 November 2024 13	Oleksandriya	3–0	Karpaty Lviv	Oleksandriia
15:30 EET (UTC+02:00)	Campos 36', 54' (pen.), 87' (pen.)	Report	Álvarez (yellow card) 44'	Stadium: Nika Stadium; Attendance: 895; Referee: Mykola Balakin

22 November 2024 14	Karpaty Lviv	1–0	Kolos Kovalivka	Lviv
18:00 EET (UTC+02:00)	Bruninho 31'; Baboglo (yellow card) 78'	Report	Veleten (yellow card) 18'; Bondarenko (yellow card) 23'; Kozik (yellow card) 39'	Stadium: Ukraina Stadium; Attendance: 1,030; Referee: Volodymyr Novokhatniy

2 December 2024 15	Zorya Luhansk	2–1	Karpaty Lviv	Kyiv
18:00 EET (UTC+02:00)	Slesar (yellow card) 40'; Budkivskyi (yellow card) 42'; Dryshlyuk (yellow card) 65'; Mićin 69', 80', (yellow card) 84'; Bašić (yellow card) 84'	Report	Polehenko 20' (pen.); Kostenko (yellow card) 46'; Pedroso (yellow card) 74'; Álvarez (yellow card) 77'; Baboglo (yellow card) 84'; Miroshnichenko (yellow card) 84'	Stadium: Lobanovskyi Dynamo Stadium; Attendance: 287; Referee: Oleh Kohut

7 December 2024 16	Karpaty Lviv	5–0	Veres Rivne	Lviv
18:00 EET (UTC+02:00)	Chachua 3', 54'; Pidlepenets 19'; Baboglo (yellow card) 31'; Bruninho 66'; Neves (penalty missed) 74'; Ustymenko 90+2', (yellow card) 90+2'	Report	Siqueira (yellow card) 25' (yellow-red card) 27'; Kohut (yellow card) 90+1'	Stadium: Ukraina Stadium; Attendance: 1,600; Referee: Maksym Kozyryatskyi

14 December 2024 17	Kryvbas Kryvyi Rih	2–0	Karpaty Lviv	Kryvyi Rih
15:30 EET (UTC+02:00)	Ilić 27' (pen.); Vakulko (yellow card) 56'; Tverdokhlib 69'	Report	Miroshnichenko (yellow card) 33'; Neves (yellow card) 34'	Stadium: Hirnyk Stadium; Attendance: 593; Referee: Dmytro Panchyshyn

23 February 2025 18	Dynamo Kyiv	2–0	Karpaty Lviv	Kyiv
18:00 EET (UTC+02:00)	Mykhaylenko 54'; Vanat 75'; Popov (yellow card) 90+1'	Report	Baboglo (yellow card) 29'; Miroshnichenko (yellow card) 31'	Stadium: Lobanovskyi Dynamo Stadium; Attendance: 1,461; Referee: Mykola Balakin

28 February 2025 19	Karpaty Lviv	1–0	LNZ Cherkasy	Zhytomyr^{[c]}
18:00 EET (UTC+02:00)	Álvarez (yellow card) 21' (yellow-red card) 29'; Bruninho 74' (pen.); Chachua (yellow card) 79'; Kostenko (yellow card) 90'; Klymenko (yellow card) 90+7'	Report	Tankovskyi (yellow card) 38'; Nonikashvili (yellow card) 49'; Eynel (yellow card) 54'; Kushnirenko (yellow card) 90+7', (red card) 90+7'	Stadium: Tsentralnyi Stadion; Attendance: 512; Referee: Ihor Paskhal

6 March 2025 20	Vorskla Poltava	0–0	Karpaty Lviv	Poltava
13:00 EET (UTC+02:00)	Krupskyi (yellow card) 55'	Report	Tanda (yellow card) 10'; Shakh (yellow card) 47'	Stadium: Butovsky Vorskla Stadium; Attendance: 530; Referee: Oleksandr Omelchenko

11 March 2025 21	Karpaty Lviv	0–0	Shakhtar Donetsk	Lviv
18:00 EET (UTC+02:00)	Tanda (yellow card) 15'; Sych (yellow card) 75'	Report	Marlon (yellow card) 35'; Matviyenko (yellow card) 79'	Stadium: Ukraina Stadium; Attendance: 3,250; Referee: Vitaliy Romanov

30 March 2025 22	Karpaty Lviv	4–0	Chornomorets Odesa	Lviv
15:30 EEST (UTC+03:00)	Kostenko (yellow card) 22', (goal) 56'; Bruninho 41' (pen.), 45' (pen.), 50'	Report	Rakitskyi (yellow card) 87'	Stadium: Ukraina Stadium; Attendance: 3,200; Referee: Anastasiya Romanyuk

7 April 2025 23	Polissya Zhytomyr	1–1	Karpaty Lviv	Zhytomyr
18:00 EEST (UTC+03:00)	Sarapiy (yellow card) 26'; Batista (yellow card) 74'; Hutsulyak 88' (pen.)	Report	Stetskov (yellow card) 56'; Baboglo (yellow card) 58'; Chachua 60'; Miroshnichenko (yellow card) 85'	Stadium: Tsentralnyi Stadion; Attendance: 1,500; Referee: Viktor Kopiyevskyi

14 April 2025 24	Inhulets Petrove	1–2	Karpaty Lviv	Oleksandriia
15:30 EEST (UTC+03:00)	Pushkaryov (yellow card) 23'; Dykhtyaruk (yellow card) 37'; Svystun 90'	Report	Baboglo 5', 81'; Bruninho (penalty missed) 12'; Kostenko (yellow card) 39'	Stadium: Nika Stadium; Attendance: 386; Referee: Dmytro Yevtukhov

19 April 2025 25	Karpaty Lviv	3–1	Rukh Lviv	Lviv
13:00 EEST (UTC+03:00)	Bruninho 20'; Ocheretko (yellow card) 38'; Neves 45', (yellow card) 45+1'; Pidhurskyi 72' (o.g.); Klymenko (yellow card) 74'; Krasnopir (yellow card) 80'; Kinareykin (yellow card) 90+2'; Baboglo (yellow card) 90+5'	Report	Slyusar (yellow card) 23'; Lyakh (yellow card) 33' (yellow-red card) 90+5'; Ryabov (yellow card) 83'; Pastukh 89'; Runich (yellow card) 90+3'	Stadium: Ukraina Stadium; Attendance: 4,100; Referee: Maksym Kozyryatskyi

26 April 2025 26	Obolon Kyiv	2–2	Karpaty Lviv	Kyiv
18:00 EEST (UTC+03:00)	Stasyuk 20'; Kurko (yellow card) 26'; Karas (yellow card) 45+3'; Vitenchuk (yellow card) 62'; Taranukha 81'	Report	Pryimak 28' (o.g.); Polehenko (penalty missed) 35'; Chachua (yellow card) 45+2'; Neves 90'	Stadium: Obolon Arena; Attendance: 2,400; Referee: Nazariy Dyord

2 May 2025 27	Livyi Bereh Kyiv	2–3	Karpaty Lviv	Kyiv Oblast
15:30 EEST (UTC+03:00)	Samar (yellow card) 5'; Sokolov (yellow card) 21'; Synytsya 33'; Kohut (yellow card) 45+1'; Diego (yellow card) 58'; Banada (yellow card) 66'; Shastal (yellow card) 67'; Baboglo 73' (o.g.)	Report	Álvarez (yellow card) 8' (yellow-red card) 19'; Chachua 30', 59'; Yakymiv 63' (o.g.); Kostenko (yellow card) 66'; Baboglo (yellow card) 86'; Bruninho (yellow card) 88'; Kinareykin (yellow card) 90+4'; Polehenko (yellow card) 90+5'	Stadium: Arena Livyi Bereh; Attendance: 685; Referee: Denys Reznikov

11 May 2025 28	Karpaty Lviv	2–1	Oleksandriya	Lviv
18:00 EEST (UTC+03:00)	Krasnopir 80' (pen.); Baboglo (yellow card) 82'; Chachua 90+5'	Report	Campos 11'; Shepelyev (yellow card) 49'; Cara (yellow card) 60'; Kalyuzhnyi (yellow card) 74' (yellow-red card) 90+1'; Kopyna (yellow card) 79'; Shabanov (yellow card) 82'; Kravchenko (yellow card) 82'; Geovani (yellow card) 85'; Yermakov (yellow card) 90+3'	Stadium: Ukraina Stadium; Attendance: 3,200; Referee: Oleksiy Derevinskyi

17 May 2025 29	Kolos Kovalivka	2–1	Karpaty Lviv	Kovalivka
13:00 EEST (UTC+03:00)	Alefirenko (yellow card) 44'; Kinareykin 55' (o.g.); Krasniqi (yellow card) 67'; Gagnidze 89'; Veleten (yellow card) 90+4'	Report	Krasniqi 9' (o.g.)	Stadium: Kolos Stadium; Attendance: 495; Referee: Andriy Kovalenko

25 May 2025 30	Karpaty Lviv	1–3	Zorya Luhansk	Lviv
18:00 EEST (UTC+03:00)	Baboglo 18'; Miroshnichenko (yellow card) 65'	Report	Jordan 25'; Dryshlyuk (yellow card) 26'; Mićin 57'; Budkivskyi (yellow card) 70'; Slesar 73'	Stadium: Ukraina Stadium; Attendance: 6,500; Referee: Vitaliy Romanov

- ^{a} Karpaty stadium was banned for one match due to exceeding spectator quota in their previous home fixture against Dynamo Kyiv.
- ^{b} Venue reversal agreed upon between Karpaty and Inhulets because additional time was needed to complete certification of newly built Inhulets stadium for Premier League matches.
- ^{c} Venue changed due to unacceptable pitch condition of Ukraina Stadium after winter break.

=== Ukrainian Cup ===
21 August 2024 Round 3	Karpaty Lviv	3–0	Chornomorets Odesa	Lviv
18:00 EEST (UTC+03:00)	Ocheretko 34'; Kuzyk 43'; Chachua 75'	Report	Vasylyev (yellow card) 21'	Stadium: Ukraina Stadium; Attendance: 1,930; Referee: Nazariy Dyord

29 October 2024 Round of 16	Rukh Lviv	1–0	Karpaty Lviv	Lviv
18:00 EET (UTC+02:00)	Pidhurskyi 78'; Klymchuk (yellow card) 90+1'	Report	Adamyuk (yellow card) 16'; Miroshnichenko (yellow card) 50'; Álvarez (yellow card) 70'	Stadium: Arena Lviv; Attendance: 3,000; Referee: Vitaliy Romanov

== Statistics ==
=== Appearances and goals ===
No.	Pos	Nat	Player	Total		Premier League		Cup	
No.	Pos	Nat	Player	Apps	Goals	Apps	Goals	Apps	Goals
Goalkeepers
1	GK	(Ukraine) UKR	Yakiv Kinareykin	13	0	13	0	0	0
35	GK	(Ukraine) UKR	Oleksandr Kemkin	19	0	17	0	2	0
Defenders
3	DF	(Ukraine) UKR	Volodymyr Adamyuk	20	0	15+3	0	2	0
4	DF	(Moldova) MDA	Vladislav Baboglo	30	3	28	3	2	0
11	DF	(Ukraine) UKR	Denys Miroshnichenko	27	1	25	1	1+1	0
22	DF	(Ukraine) UKR	Bohdan Veklyak	3	0	0+2	0	0+1	0
28	DF	(Ukraine) UKR	Pavlo Polehenko	22	2	18+4	2	0	0
44	DF	(Ukraine) UKR	Taras Sakiv	7	1	4+2	1	1	0
47	DF	(Brazil) BRA	Jean Pedroso	22	1	17+3	1	1+1	0
55	DF	(Ukraine) UKR	Tymur Stetskov	7	0	7	0	0	0
77	DF	(Ukraine) UKR	Oleksiy Sych	4	0	4	0	0	0
Midfielders
7	MF	(Ukraine) UKR	Yevhen Pidlepenets	26	3	15+11	3	0	0
8	MF	(Ukraine) UKR	Ambrosiy Chachua	31	11	28+1	10	1+1	1
14	MF	(Ukraine) UKR	Illya Kvasnytsya	7	0	0+7	0	0	0
17	MF	(Ukraine) UKR	Oleh Fedor	9	0	0+9	0	0	0
18	MF	(Ukraine) UKR	Vladyslav Klymenko	16	0	3+11	0	1+1	0
19	MF	(Ukraine) UKR	Ivan Chaban	1	0	0+1	0	0	0
20	MF	(Ukraine) UKR	Oleh Ocheretko	28	3	22+4	2	2	1
21	MF	(Argentina) ARG	Patricio Tanda	9	0	5+4	0	0	0
23	MF	(Spain) ESP	Pablo Álvarez	28	0	26	0	2	0
26	MF	(Ukraine) UKR	Yan Kostenko	28	1	19+7	1	0+2	0
27	MF	(Ukraine) UKR	Orest Kuzyk	8	1	1+6	0	1	1
33	MF	(Ukraine) UKR	Artur Shakh	27	2	6+19	2	1+1	0
37	MF	(Brazil) BRA	Bruninho	25	8	23+1	8	1	0
Forwards
10	FW	(Brazil) BRA	Igor Neves	31	2	19+11	2	1	0
95	FW	(Ukraine) UKR	Ihor Krasnopir	13	1	9+4	1	0	0
Away on loan
30	FW	(Ukraine) UKR	Vadym Sydun	1	0	0+1	0	0	0
43	MF	(Brazil) BRA	Stênio	17	0	4+11	0	2	0
Players who left during the season
9	MF	(Ukraine) UKR	Yuriy Tlumak	5	0	0+4	0	0+1	0
13	FW	(Ukraine) UKR	Denys Ustymenko	14	1	2+10	1	1+1	0
16	MF	(Ukraine) UKR	Artur Ryabov	4	0	0+4	0	0	0

Source: Competitions

Last updated: 25 May 2025

=== Goalscorers ===
Rank	No.	Pos	Nat	Name	Premier League	Cup	Total
1	8	MF	(Ukraine)	Ambrosiy Chachua	10	1	11
2	37	MF	(Brazil)	Bruninho	8	0	8
3				Own goal	4	0	4
4	20	MF	(Ukraine)	Oleh Ocheretko	2	1	3
	7	MF	(Ukraine)	Yevhen Pidlepenets	3	0	3
	4	DF	(Moldova)	Vladislav Baboglo	3	0	3
7	33	MF	(Ukraine)	Artur Shakh	2	0	2
	28	DF	(Ukraine)	Pavlo Polehenko	2	0	2
	10	FW	(Brazil)	Igor Neves	2	0	2
10	17	MF	(Ukraine)	Orest Kuzyk	0	1	1
	44	DF	(Ukraine)	Taras Sakiv	1	0	1
	11	DF	(Ukraine)	Denys Miroshnichenko	1	0	1
	47	DF	(Brazil)	Jean Pedroso	1	0	1
	13	FW	(Ukraine)	Denys Ustymenko	1	0	1
	26	MF	(Ukraine)	Yan Kostenko	1	0	1
	95	FW	(Ukraine)	Ihor Krasnopir	1	0	1
				Total	42	3	45

Last updated: 25 May 2025

=== Clean sheets ===
Rank	No.	Pos	Nat	Name	Premier League	Cup	Total
1	35	GK	(Ukraine)	Oleksandr Kemkin	8	1	9
2	1	GK	(Ukraine)	Yakiv Kinareykin	5	0	5
				Total	13	1	14

Last updated: 30 March 2025

=== Disciplinary record ===
No.	Pos	Nat	Player	Premier League			Cup			Total		
No.	Pos	Nat	Player	Yellow card	(yellow card) (yellow-red card)	Red card	Yellow card	(yellow card) (yellow-red card)	Red card	Yellow card	(yellow card) (yellow-red card)	Red card
1	GK	(Ukraine)	Yakiv Kinareykin	2	0	0	0	0	0	2	0	0
3	DF	(Ukraine)	Volodymyr Adamyuk	0	1	0	1	0	0	1	1	0
4	DF	(Moldova)	Vladislav Baboglo	8	0	0	0	0	0	8	0	0
8	MF	(Ukraine)	Ambrosiy Chachua	3	0	0	0	0	0	3	0	0
10	FW	(Brazil)	Igor Neves	2	0	0	0	0	0	2	0	0
11	DF	(Ukraine)	Denys Miroshnichenko	9	0	0	1	0	0	10	0	0
18	MF	(Ukraine)	Vladyslav Klymenko	3	0	0	0	0	0	3	0	0
20	MF	(Ukraine)	Oleh Ocheretko	2	0	0	0	0	0	2	0	0
21	MF	(Argentina)	Patricio Tanda	2	0	0	0	0	0	2	0	0
23	MF	(Spain)	Pablo Álvarez	4	2	0	1	0	0	5	2	0
26	MF	(Ukraine)	Yan Kostenko	5	1	0	0	0	0	5	1	0
28	DF	(Ukraine)	Pavlo Polehenko	1	0	0	0	0	0	1	0	0
33	MF	(Ukraine)	Artur Shakh	3	0	0	0	0	0	3	0	0
35	GK	(Ukraine)	Oleksandr Kemkin	1	0	0	0	0	0	1	0	0
37	MF	(Brazil)	Bruninho	1	0	0	0	0	0	1	0	0
47	DF	(Brazil)	Jean Pedroso	2	0	0	0	0	0	2	0	0
55	DF	(Ukraine)	Tymur Stetskov	1	0	0	0	0	0	1	0	0
77	DF	(Ukraine)	Oleksiy Sych	1	0	0	0	0	0	1	0	0
95	FW	(Ukraine)	Ihor Krasnopir	1	0	0	0	0	0	1	0	0
Players who left during the season:
13	FW	(Ukraine)	Denys Ustymenko	1	0	0	0	0	0	1	0	0
16	MF	(Ukraine)	Artur Ryabov	1	0	0	0	0	0	1	0	0
			Total	53	4	0	3	0	0	56	4	0

Last updated: 25 May 2025

== Sources ==
- Official website
