= Pavlo Polehenko =

Ukrainian footballer

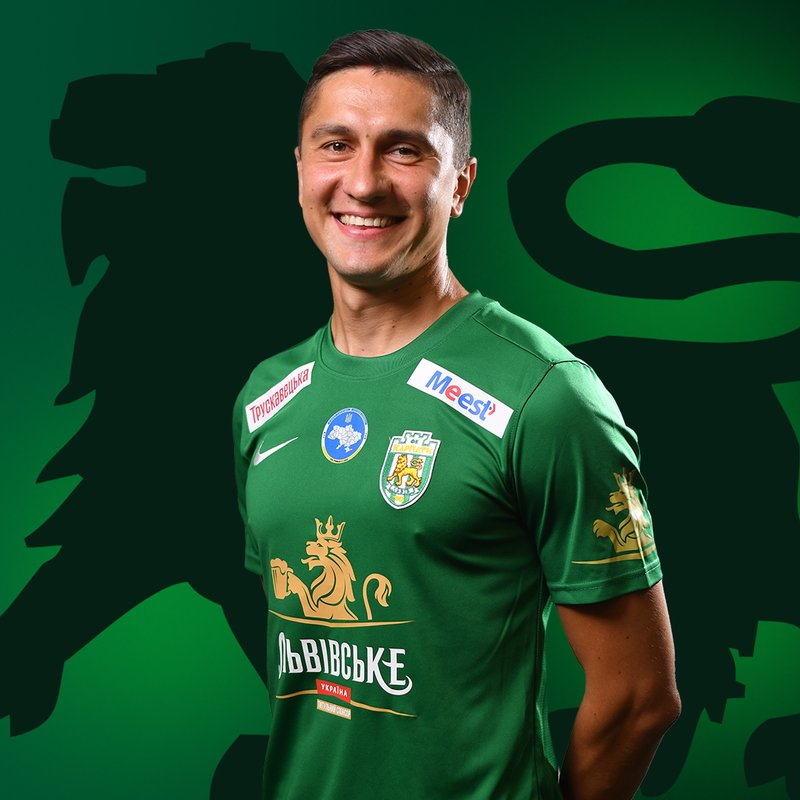

Personal information
- Full name: Pavlo Ihorovych Polehenko
- Date of birth: 6 January 1995 (age 31)
- Place of birth: Chernihiv, Ukraine
- Height: 1.79 m (5 ft 10 in)
- Position: Defender

Team information
- Current team: Obolon Kyiv
- Number: 28

Youth career
- 2001–2006: Yunist Chernihiv
- 2006–2012: Dynamo Kyiv

Senior career*
Years	Team	Apps	(Gls)
2012–2016	Dynamo Kyiv	0	(0)
2015	→ Hoverla Uzhhorod (loan)	3	(0)
2015–2016	→ Dynamo-2 Kyiv	22	(5)
2016–2018	Zirka Kropyvnytskyi	43	(1)
2018–2020	Mariupol	38	(1)
2020–2021	Desna Chernihiv	10	(0)
2021–2022	Inhulets Petrove	17	(1)
2022	Lviv	9	(0)
2023	Zorya Luhansk	12	(0)
2023–2025	Karpaty Lviv	70	(8)
2026–	Obolon Kyiv	22	(2)

International career^{‡}
2012	Ukraine U16	1	(0)
2012	Ukraine U17	5	(0)
2012–2013	Ukraine U18	11	(0)
2013	Ukraine U19	6	(0)
2014–2015	Ukraine U20	10	(1)
2016	Ukraine U21	3	(0)
- * Club domestic league appearances and goals as of 22 November 2026 ‡ National team caps and goals as of 27 August 2020

Pavlo Ihorovych Polehenko (Ukrainian: Павло Ігорович Полегенько; born 6 January 1995) is a Ukrainian professional footballer who plays as a defender for Obolon Kyiv.

== Career ==
Polehenko is a product of the Yunist Chernihiv and Dynamo Kyiv youth academies.

=== Loan to Hoverla Uzhhorod ===
In July 2015, Polehenko went on loan to Hoverla Uzhhorod in the Ukrainian Premier League. On 19 July, He made his debut for the club against Dnipro Dnipropetrovsk.

=== Dynamo-2 Kyiv ===
In 2015 he moved to Dynamo-2 Kyiv in the Ukrainian First League.

=== Zirka Kropyvnytskyi ===
In 2016, Polehenko moved to Zirka Kropyvnytskyi in the Ukrainian Premier League.

=== Mariupol ===
In 2018 he moved to Mariupol, where played for two seasons.

=== Desna Chernihiv ===
In the summer of 2020 he signed a contract with Desna. On 4 October he made his debut with the new team against Shakhtar Donetsk at the Chernihiv Stadium. At the end of May 2021 his contract with Desna was ended by mutual agreement.

=== Inhulets Petrove ===
That same month, he signed for Inhulets Petrove. He made his debut for the club against Shakhtar Donetsk at the NSC Olimpiyskiy in Kyiv on 24 July 2021. On 10 December he scored his first league goal for Inhulets Petrove against Desna Chernihiv.

=== Lviv ===
In summer 2022 he moved to Lviv in the Ukrainian Premier League.

=== Zorya Luhansk ===
In March 2023 he signed for Zorya Luhansk. On 18 March 2023 he made his debut against Dynamo Kyiv at the Valeriy Lobanovskyi Dynamo Stadium.

=== Karpaty Lviv ===
In summer 2023 he moved to Karpaty Lviv in Ukrainian First League. He made his contribution to the promotion to the Ukrainian First League. On 2 July 2025 his contract with the club was extended. On 8 January 2026 his contract with the club was terminated by mututal agreement.

=== Obolon Kyiv ===
On 15 January 2026, he signed for Obolon Kyiv.

== Career statistics ==
=== Club ===
As of match played 22 November 2026

Appearances and goals by club, season and competition
Club	Season	League			Cup		Europe		Other		Total	
Club	Season	Division	Apps	Goals	Apps	Goals	Apps	Goals	Apps	Goals	Apps	Goals
Hoverla Uzhhorod (loan)	2015–16	Ukrainian Premier League	3	0	1	0	0	0	0	0	4	0
Dynamo-2 Kyiv (loan)	2015–16	Ukrainian First League	22	3	0	0	0	0	0	0	22	3
Zirka Kropyvnytskyi	2016–17	Ukrainian Premier League	19	1	1	0	0	0	0	0	20	1
Zirka Kropyvnytskyi	2017–18	Ukrainian Premier League	23	0	1	0	0	0	0	0	24	0
Mariupol	2018–19	Ukrainian Premier League	21	0	1	0	4	0	0	0	26	0
Mariupol	2019–20	Ukrainian Premier League	17	1	3	0	2	0	0	0	20	1
Desna Chernihiv	2020–21	Ukrainian Premier League	10	0	0	0	0	0	0	0	10	0
Inhulets Petrove	2021–22	Ukrainian Premier League	17	1	1	0	0	0	0	0	18	1
Lviv	2022-23	Ukrainian Premier League	9	0	0	0	0	0	0	0	9	0
Zorya Luhansk	2022-23	Ukrainian Premier League	12	0	0	0	0	0	0	0	12	0
Karpaty Lviv	2023-24	Ukrainian First League	28	6	0	0	0	0	0	0	28	6
Karpaty Lviv	2024–25	Ukrainian Premier League	22	2	0	0	0	0	0	0	22	2
Karpaty Lviv	2025–26	Ukrainian Premier League	12	0	1	0	0	0	0	0	13	0
Obolon Kyiv	2025–26	Ukrainian Premier League	13	1	0	0	0	0	0	0	13	1
Obolon Kyiv	2026–27	Ukrainian Premier League	10	1	1	0	0	0	0	0	11	1
Career total			238	16	10	0	6	0	0	0	252	16

== Honours ==
Karpaty Lviv

- Ukrainian First League runner-up: 2023–24
