= Yuriy Dyachuk-Stavytskyi =

Ukrainian footballer (1947–2020)

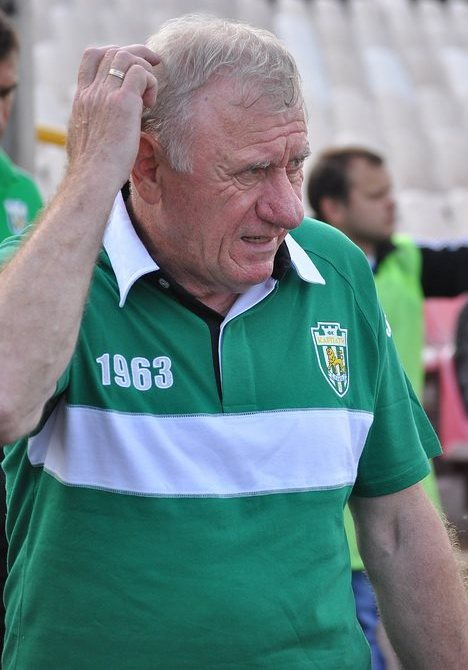

Personal information
- Full name: Yuriy Mykhaylovych Dyachuk-Stavytskyi
- Date of birth: 26 January 1947
- Place of birth: Lviv, Ukrainian SSR
- Date of death: 24 June 2020 (aged 73)
- Place of death: Lviv, Ukraine
- Position: Goalkeeper

Senior career*
Years	Team	Apps	(Gls)
1966–1968	Horyn Rivne		
1969	FC Shakhtar Chervonohrad		
1970–1975	Avanhard Stryi		

Managerial career
- 1980: Bukovyna Chernivtsi (assistant)
- 1983–1988: Prykarpattya Ivano-Frankivsk
- 1989: Karpaty Lviv (vice-president)
- 1990: FC Elektron Mostyska
- 1994–1995: Hazovyk Komarno
- 1996: Volyn Lutsk
- 1996–1998: Karpaty Lviv (assistant)
- 1999–2001: Metalurh Zaporizhya (assistant)
- 2002: Anzhi Makhachkala (assistant)
- 2004: Karpaty Lviv
- 2004–2006: Karpaty Lviv
- 2007: Karpaty Lviv
- 2012: Karpaty Lviv (caretaker)
- 2013: Karpaty Lviv (caretaker)
- 2015–2017: Karpaty Lviv (general director)
- * Club domestic league appearances and goals

Yuriy Dyachuk-Stavytskyi (Ukrainian: Юрій Михайлович Дячук-Ставицький; 26 January 1947 – 24 June 2020) was a Ukrainian football manager.

== Career ==
He coached following teams FC Bukovyna Chernivtsi, FC Prykarpattya Ivano-Frankivsk, FC Volyn Lutsk, FC Hazovyk Komarne (today's FC Lviv), FC Anzhi Makhachkala, and FC Metalurh Zaporizhia. Honorary coach of Ukraine of 1999.

He died on 24 June 2020.

== Personal life ==
His son Mykhaylo is also a Ukrainian retired footballer and current manager.
