= Vasyl Hakman =

Ukrainian footballer

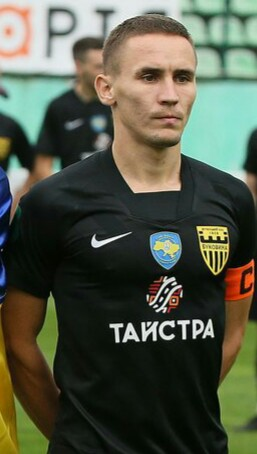

Personal information
- Full name: Vasyl Mykhaylovych Hakman
- Date of birth: 16 May 2000 (age 26)
- Place of birth: Korytne, Ukraine
- Height: 1.75 m (5 ft 9 in)
- Position: Right-back

Youth career
- 2014–2019: Bukovyna Chernivtsi

Senior career*
Years	Team	Apps	(Gls)
2017	Cheremosh Vyzhnytsia	2	(0)
2017–2023	Bukovyna Chernivtsi	82	(0)
2023–2025	Veres Rivne	22	(0)
2025–2026	Bukovyna Chernivtsi	11	(0)
2025	→ Bukovyna-2 Chernivtsi	4	(1)
- * Club domestic league appearances and goals as of 3 June 2026

Vasyl Mykhaylovych Hakman (Ukrainian: Василь Михайлович Гакман; born 16 May 2000) is a Ukrainian professional footballer who plays as a right-back.
