= 2017–18 Ukrainian Amateur Cup =

2017–18 Ukrainian Cup for amateur teams
Tournament details
- Country: Ukraine
- Dates: 23 August 2017 – 10 June 2018
- Teams: 40

Final positions
- Champions: LNZ-Lebedyn
- Runners-up: Viktoriya Mykolaivka
- Semifinalists: VPK-Ahro Shevchenkivka; Rochyn Sosnivka

The 2017-18 Ukrainian Amateur Cup was the 22nd season of the national football cup competition for amateur teams, which was scheduled to start on August 23, 2017.

The cup holders SC Chaika Petropavlivska Borshchahivka were defeated by Avanhard Koryukivka in the round of 32.

== Participated clubs ==
In bold are clubs that were active at the same season AAFU championship (parallel round-robin competition).

- Cherkasy Oblast: LNZ-Lebedyn
- Chernihiv Oblast (2): **Avanhard Koryukivka**, **Yednist Plysky**
- Dnipropetrovsk Oblast (3): **Hirnyk Kryvyi Rih**, Kryvyi Rih, VPK-Ahro Shevchenkivka
- Donetsk Oblast (3): Forum-Avto Kramatorsk, Sapfir Kramatorsk, **Yarud Mariupol**
- Ivano-Frankivsk Oblast (2): **Kalush**, **Pokuttia Kolomyia**
- Kherson Oblast (5): **Druzhba Novomykolayivka**, **Kakhovka**, Kolos Askania-Nova, **Krystal Kherson**, Meliorator Kamianka
- Khmelnytskyi Oblast: **Khmelnytskyi**
- Kyiv and Kyiv Oblast (4): **Chaika Petropavlivska Borshchahivka**, DH Shevchenkivske Denykhivka, Dzhuniors Sofiivska Borshchahivka, **Rubikon Kyiv**
- Lviv Oblast (4): Demnya, Mykolaiv, **Rochyn Sosnivka**, Yunist Verkhnia Bilka
- Luhansk Oblast: Zorya Rubizhne
- Poltava Oblast: Olimpiya Savyntsi
- Rivne Oblast (3): Izotop-RAES Varash, Mayak Sarny, **ODEK Orzhiv**
- Sumy Oblast (2): **Ahrobiznes TSK Romny**, **Viktoriya Mykolayivka**
- Ternopil Oblast (2): DSO-Podillya Ternopil Raion, **Nyva Terebovlya**
- Vinnytsia Oblast (3): Ahro-Astra Nemyriv Raion, **Fakel Lypovets**, Svitanok-Ahrosvit Shlyakhova
- Zaporizhia Oblast (2): **Metalurh Zaporizhia**, **Tavriya-Skif Rozdol**
- Zakarpattia Oblast: Sevlyush Vynohradiv

== Bracket ==
The following is the bracket that demonstrates the last four rounds of the Ukrainian Cup, including the final match. Numbers in parentheses next to the match score represent the results of a penalty shoot-out.

Round of 16
Rochyn Sosnivka (a)	0	2	2
ODEK Orzhiv	0	2	2
FC Mykolaiv	0	1	1
SCC Demnya	1	2	3
Ahro-Astra Nemyriv Raion	2	0	2
LNZ-Lebedyn	4	4	8
Fakel Lypovets (a)	0	4	4
Avanhard Koryukivka	3	1	4
Viktoriya Mykolaivka	4	3	7
Yednist Plysky	2	2	4
Ahrobiznes TSK Romny	1	1	2
Metalurh Zaporizhia	3	3	6
Yarud Mariupol	1	0	0
VPK-Ahro Shevchenkivka	3	0	3
Hirnyk Kryvyi Rih	3	0	3
Krystal Kherson (a)	2	1	3

Quarter-finals
Rochyn Sosnivka	2	0	2
SCC Demnya	0	0	0
Fakel Lypovets	0	2	2
LNZ-Lebedyn	2	5	7
Metalurh Zaporizhia	1	0	1
Viktoriya Mykolaivka	0	2	2
Krystal Kherson	2	0	2
VPK-Ahro Shevchenkivka	0	4	4

Semi-finals
Rochyn Sosnivka	0	0	0
LNZ-Lebedyn	1	1	2
VPK-Ahro Shevchenkivka	0	0	0
Viktoriya Mykolaivka	1	1	2

Final
Viktoriya Mykolayivka	0	2	2
LNZ-Lebedyn	3	0	3

== Competition schedule ==
=== Preliminary round ===
First games will be played on 23–24 August and seconds on 30–31 August.

Team 1	Agg.	Team 2	1st leg	2nd leg
FC Mykolaiv	7–1	FC Sevlyush Vynohradiv	4–1	3–0
FC Yunist Verkhnia Bilka	3–1	FC Izotop-RAES Varash	1–0	2–1
FC Mayak Sarny	3–3 (a)	FC Ahro-Astra Nemyriv Raion	2–2	1–1 (Note: played at Khimik Stadium, Vinnytsia)
FC Olimpiya Savyntsi	2–1	FC Kryvyi Rih	1–1 (Note: played at Start Stadium, Myrhorod)	1–0
FC LNZ-Lebedyn	4–2	FC Dzhuniors SB	2–1	2–1 (Note: played at Stadium, Vyshneve)
FC Forum-Avto Kramatorsk	0–2	FC VPK-Ahro Shevchenkivka	0–0	0–2
FC Tavriya-Skif Rozdol	9–3	FC Meliorator Kamianka	4–0	5–3
FC Zorya Rubizhne	3–1	FC Sapfir Kramatorsk	1–1	2–0

Twenty four other teams will join eight winner of the preliminary round.

=== Round of 32 ===
First games will be played on 13 September and seconds on 20 September. Chaika–Avanhard Kor will play on 10th and 23rd.

Team 1	Agg.	Team 2	1st leg	2nd leg
FC Rochyn Sosnivka	3–1	FC Pokuttya Kolomyia	3–0	0–1
FC Yunist Verkhnia Bilka	0–2	FC ODEK Orzhiv	0–0 (Note: played at Yunist Stadium, Nyzhnia Bilka)	0–2
FC Kalush	2–3	SCC Demnya	2–2	0–1
FC Mykolaiv	3–2	FC Nyva Terebovlya	2–2	1–0
FC Khmelnytskyi	0–2	FC Ahro-Astra Nemyriv Raion	0–2	0–0
FC Fakel Lypovets	4–3	FC DSO-Podillya Ternopil Raion	2–2	2–1 (Note: played at Kolos Stadium, Zbarazh)
FC Chaika Kyiv-Svyatoshyn Raion	0–1	FC Avanhard Koryukivka	0–0	0–1
FC LNZ-Lebedyn	4–0	FC Svitanok-Ahrosvit Shlyakhova	3–0	1–0
FC DH Shevchenkivske Denykhivka	0–5	FC Yednist Plysky	0–1	0–4 (Note: played at Kozak-Arena, Petropavlivska-Borshchahivka)
FC Viktoriya Mykolayivka	5–0	FC Rubikon Kyiv	1–0	4–0
FC Ahrobiznes TSK Romny	3–2	FC Olimpiya Savyntsi	1–0	2–2
MFC Metalurh Zaporizhia	7–3	FC Zorya Rubizhne	6–0	1–3
FC Yarud Mariupol	4–1	FC Kolos Askania-Nova	2–1	2–0
SC Kakhovka	1–2	FC VPK-Ahro Shevchenkivka	0–1	1–1
FC Hirnyk Kryvyi Rih	5–4	FC Druzhba Novomykolayivka	1–1	4–3 (Note: played at Hirnyk Stadium, Kryvyi Rih)
FC Tavriya-Skif Rozdol	2–4	FC Krystal Kherson	1–3	1–1

=== Round of 16 ===
First games will be played on 4 October and seconds on 11 October.

Team 1	Agg.	Team 2	1st leg	2nd leg
FC Rochyn Sosnivka	(a) 2–2	FC ODEK Orzhiv	0–0 (Note: played at Shakhtar Stadium, Chervonohrad)	2–2
FC Mykolaiv	1–3	SCC Demnya	0–1	1–2
FC Ahro-Astra Nemyriv Raion	2–8	FC LNZ-Lebedyn	2–4 (Note: played at Ya.Kulyk Stadium, Vinnytsia)	0–4
FC Fakel Lypovets	(a) 4–4	FC Avanhard Koryukivka	0–3	4–1
FC Viktoriya Mykolaivka	7–4	FC Yednist Plysky	4–2	3–2
FC Ahrobiznes TSK Romny	2–6	MFC Metalurh Zaporizhia	1–3	1–3
FC Yarud Mariupol	1–3	FC VPK-Ahro Shevchenkivka	1–3	0–0
FC Hirnyk Kryvyi Rih	3–3 (a)	FC Krystal Kherson	3–2	0–1

=== Quarterfinals ===
First games will be played on 11 April and second on 18 April, 2018.

The game Rochyn – Demnya was played on 10 April.

Team 1	Agg.	Team 2	1st leg	2nd leg
FC Rochyn Sosnivka	2–0	SCC Demnya	2–0	0–0
FC Fakel Lypovets	2–7	FC LNZ-Lebedyn	0–2 (Note: game played at Sports Complex Nyva, Vinnytsia)	2–5
MFC Metalurh Zaporizhia	1–2	FC Viktoriya Mykolaivka	1–0	0–2 (Note: game played at FC Barsa Stadium, Sumy)
FC Krystal Kherson	2–4	FC VPK-Ahro Shevchenkivka	2–0	0–4 (Note: game played at Kolos Stadium, Mahdalynivka)

=== Semifinals ===
First games will be played on 2 May and second on 9 May, 2018.

Team 1	Agg.	Team 2	1st leg	2nd leg
FC Rochyn Sosnivka	0–2	FC LNZ-Lebedyn	0–1	0–1
FC VPK-Ahro Shevchenkivka	0–2	FC Viktoriya Mykolayivka	0–1	0–1

=== Finals ===
First game will be played on 20 May and second on 10 June 2018.

Team 1	Agg.	Team 2	1st leg	2nd leg
FC Viktoriya Mykolayivka	2–3	FC LNZ-Lebedyn	0–3	2–0

Winner of the 2017–18 Ukrainian Football Cup among amateur teams
LNZ-Lebedyn (Cherkasy Oblast); 1st time

== See also ==
- 2017–18 Ukrainian Football Amateur League
- 2017–18 Ukrainian Cup
