= Maksym Melnychenko =

Ukrainian footballer

Personal information
- Full name: Maksym Ruslanovych Melnychenko
- Date of birth: 12 February 2005 (age 21)
- Place of birth: Odesa, Ukraine
- Height: 1.78 m (5 ft 10 in)
- Position: Midfielder

Team information
- Current team: Chornomorets Odesa (on loan from Polissya Zhytomyr)
- Number: 60

Youth career
- 2017–2021: Chornomorets Odesa
- 2021–2024: Dnipro-1

Senior career*
| Years | Team | Apps | (Gls) |
| 2024 | Dnipro-1 | 2 | (0) |
| 2024 | Karpaty Lviv | 0 | (0) |
| 2024 | → Polissya Zhytomyr (loan) | 7 | (0) |
| 2025– | Polissya Zhytomyr | 6 | (0) |
| 2026– | → Chornomorets Odesa (loan) | 0 | (0) |

International career^{‡}
| 2019 | Ukraine U16 | 1 | (0) |
| 2023–2024 | Ukraine U19 | 10 | (0) |
| 2025 | Ukraine U20 | 8 | (0) |
| 2024– | Ukraine U21 | 7 | (0) |
- * Club domestic league appearances and goals as of 5 September 2026 ‡ National team caps and goals as of 8 October 2025

Maksym Ruslanovych Melnychenko (Ukrainian: Максим Русланович Мельниченко; born 12 February 2005) is a Ukrainian professional footballer who plays as a midfielder for Ukrainian club Chornomorets Odesa on loan from Polissya Zhytomyr.

== Club career ==
Born in Odesa, Melnychenko began his career in the Chornomorets Odesa academy, then he continued in the Dnipro-1, joining it in July 2021, where he played in the Ukrainian Premier League Reserves.

He made his debut as a second half-time substituted player for Dnipro-1 in the Ukrainian Premier League in an away match against LNZ Cherkasy on 12 March 2024.

On 7 September 2024, Melnychenko joined Polissya Zhytomyr on loan until 31 December 2024, with an option to buy.

On 29 August 2026, Melnychenko joined Chornomorets Odesa on loan from Polissya Zhytomyr.

== International career ==
Melnychenko was called up to the Ukraine national under-19 football team to play in the 2024 UEFA European Under-19 Championship qualification in Malta.

In March 2024, Melnychenko was called up by manager Dmytro Mykhaylenko to the final squad of the Ukraine national under-19 football team to play in the 2024 UEFA European Under-19 Championship elit round matches.
