= Bruninho (footballer, born 2000) =

Brazilian footballer

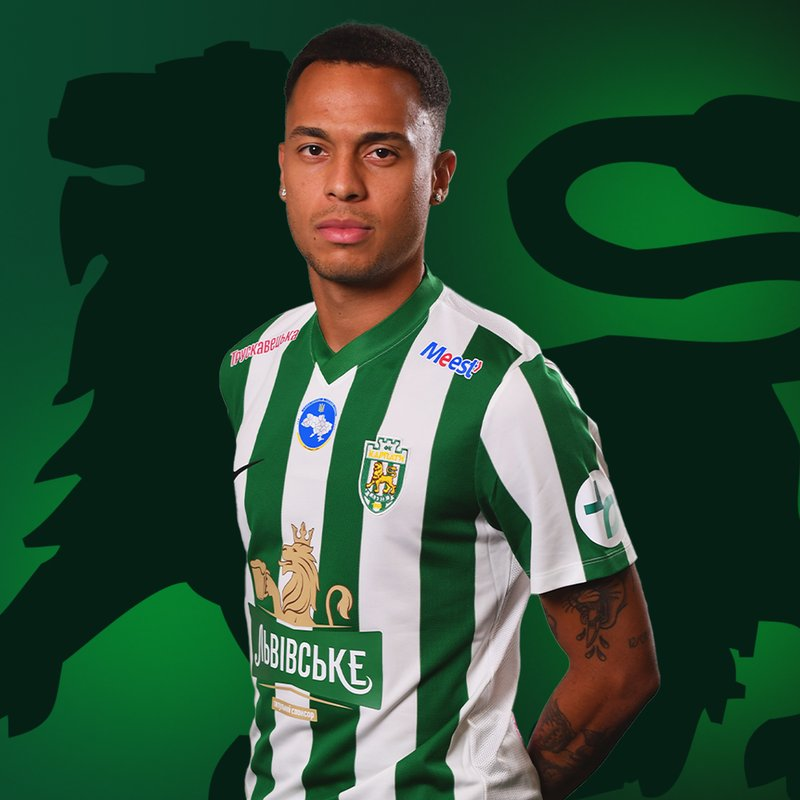
- Bruninho in 2025

Personal information
- Full name: Bruno Roberto Pereira da Silva
- Date of birth: 27 April 2000 (age 26)
- Place of birth: Belo Horizonte, Brazil
- Height: 1.75 m (5 ft 9 in)
- Position: Attacking midfielder

Team information
- Current team: Maccabi Haifa
- Number: 10

Youth career
- 2013–2019: Atlético Mineiro

Senior career*
Years	Team	Apps	(Gls)
2018–2025	Atlético Mineiro	26	(2)
2020–2021	→ Sport Recife (loan)	18	(0)
2021	→ Confiança (loan)	9	(6)
2021–2022	→ Juventude (loan)	23	(0)
2022	→ CRB (loan)	14	(0)
2023	→ Guarani (loan)	45	(10)
2024	→ Ceará (loan)	7	(0)
2024	→ Boavista (loan)	0	(0)
2024–2025	→ Karpaty Lviv (loan)	24	(8)
2025-2026	Karpaty Lviv	26	(8)
2026–	Maccabi Haifa	10	(4)
- * Club domestic league appearances and goals as of 2 July 2026

Bruno Roberto Pereira da Silva (born 27 April 2000), commonly known as Bruninho, is a Brazilian footballer who plays as an attacking midfielder for Israeli Premier League club Maccabi Haifa.

== Career ==
Born in Belo Horizonte, Minas Gerais, Bruninho joined Atlético Mineiro's youth setup in 2013, aged 13. He made his first team debut on 25 January 2018, coming on as a second-half substitute for Valdívia in a 1–0 Campeonato Mineiro away loss to Villa Nova.

Bruninho made his Série A debut on 2 June 2018, replacing Elias late into a 3–3 home draw against Chapecoense. He scored his first professional goal on 15 September 2019, netting his team's only in a 3–1 home loss to Internacional.

On 11 March 2020, Bruninho was loaned to fellow top-tier side Sport Recife until the end of the year; Atlético later renewed his contract until 2023 on 30 April. On 1 March 2021, after featuring sparingly, he moved to Confiança also in a temporary deal.

On 25 May 2021, after scoring nine goals in just 16 matches for Confiança, Bruninho moved to Juventude also on loan. On 17 December, his loan was renewed for a further year.

On 29 July 2022, after being rarely used at Ju during the year, Bruninho was recalled by Atlético, and was immediately loaned to CRB for the remainder of the season. On 2 December, he further extended his link with Galo until 2024 and was loaned to Guarani for the upcoming campaign.

On 18 January 2024, Bruninho was unveiled as a Ceará player, on loan for the 2024 season.

On 5 July 2024, Bruninho joined Primeira Liga club Boavista on loan for the 2024–25 season. He left the club on 1 September 2024, as Boavista was unable to lift the ban on registering new players by the end of the transfer window.

On 6 September 2024, Bruninho joined Karpaty Lviv of the Ukrainian Premier League on a season-long loan. On 18 June 2025, the club announced an agreement for a permanent transfer.

On 2 July 2026, Bruninho joined Maccabi Haifa of the Israeli Premier League .

== Personal life ==
Bruninho's father, Bruno Heleno, was also a footballer. A right back, he was also developed at Atlético.

== Career statistics ==
As of 30 June 2025.

Club	Season	League			State League		Cup		Continental		Other		Total	
Club	Season	Division	Apps	Goals	Apps	Goals	Apps	Goals	Apps	Goals	Apps	Goals	Apps	Goals
Atlético Mineiro	2018	Série A	5	0	3 (Note: Appearances in the Campeonato Mineiro)	0	0	0	1 (Note: Appearances in the Copa Sudamericana)	0	—		9	0
Atlético Mineiro	2019	Série A	13	2	2	0	0	0	1	0	—		16	2
Atlético Mineiro	2020	Série A	0	0	3	0	0	0	0	0	—		3	0
Atlético Mineiro	Total		18	2	8	0	0	0	2	0	—		28	2
Sport Recife (loan)	2020	Série A	16	0	2 (Note: Appearances in the Campeonato Pernambucano)	0	—		—		3 (Note: Appearances in the Copa do Nordeste)	0	21	0
Confiança (loan)	2021	Série B	0	0	9 (Note: Appearances in the Campeonato Sergipano)	6	1	0	—		7	3	17	9
Juventude	2021	Série A	16	0	—		—		—		—		16	0
Juventude	2022	Série A	5	0	2 (Note: Appearances in the Campeonato Gaúcho)	0	0	0	—		—		7	0
Juventude	Total		21	0	2	0	0	0	—		—		23	0
CRB (loan)	2022	Série B	14	0	—		—		—		—		14	0
Guarani (loan)	2023	Série B	33	7	12 (Note: Appearances in the Campeonato Paulista)	3	—		—		—		45	10
Ceará (loan)	2024	Série B	1	0	6 (Note: Appearances in the Campeonato Cearense)	0	2	0	—		4	0	13	0
Karpaty Lviv (loan)	2024–25	Ukrainian Premier League	24	8	—		1	0	—		—		25	8
Career total			127	17	39	9	4	0	2	0	14	3	186	29

== Honours ==
Atlético Mineiro

- Campeonato Mineiro: 2020

Ceará

- Campeonato Cearense: 2024

Individual

- Ukrainian Premier League Player of the Month: September 2025
