= Yevhen Korokhov =

Ukrainian footballer

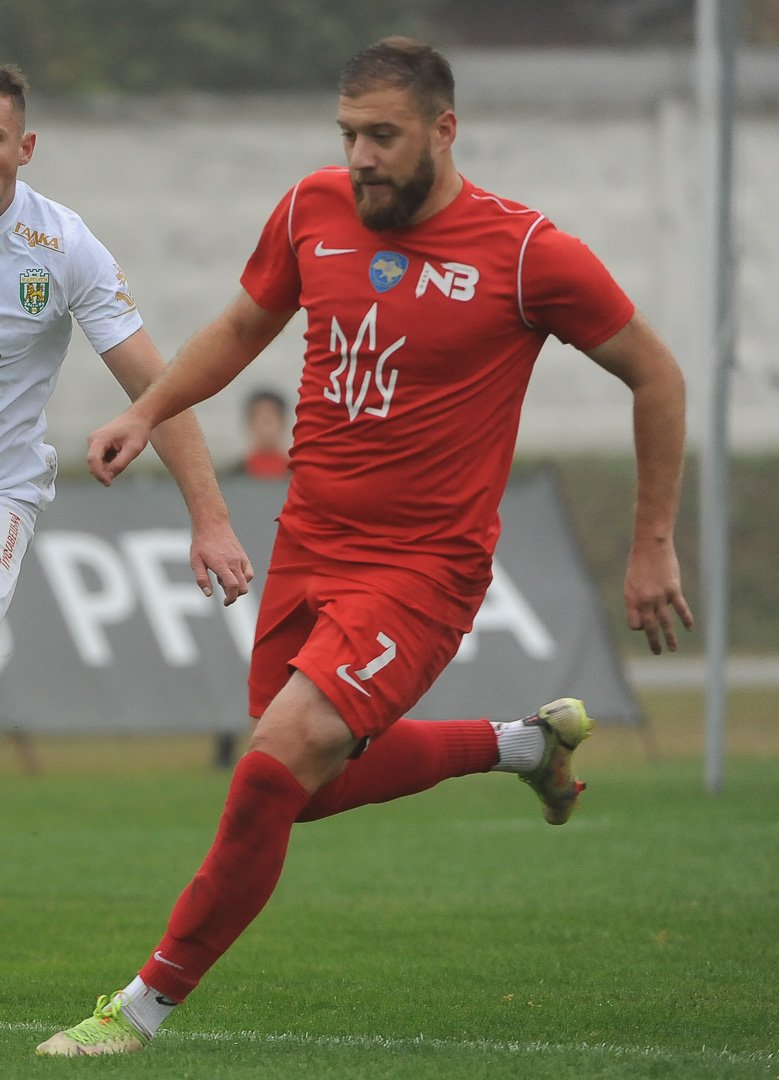

Personal information
- Full name: Yevhen Viktorovych Korokhov
- Date of birth: 17 March 1998 (age 28)
- Place of birth: Zaporizhzhia, Ukraine
- Height: 1.77 m (5 ft 10 in)
- Position: Right-back

Team information
- Current team: Viktoriya Sumy
- Number: 17

Youth career
- 2011–2015: Metalurh Zaporizhzhia

Senior career*
Years	Team	Apps	(Gls)
2015	Metalurh Zaporizhzhia	0	(0)
2016	Shakhtar Donetsk	0	(0)
2016	Zorya Luhansk	0	(0)
2017	Tavria-Skif Rozdol	8	(0)
2017–2018	Metalurh Zaporizhzhia	13	(1)
2018	Arsenal Kyiv	0	(0)
2018–2019	Metalurh Zaporizhzhia	17	(1)
2019–2020	Polissya Zhytomyr	13	(0)
2020–2022	Podillya Khmelnytskyi	41	(0)
2022	→ Legionovia Legionowo (loan)	0	(0)
2022–2023	Obolon Kyiv	13	(0)
2023	Nyva Buzova	17	(0)
2024–25	Viktoriya Sumy	31	(0)
2025-	FC Podillya Khmelnytskyi	0	(0)

International career^{‡}
2015–2016	Ukraine U19	6	(0)
- * Club domestic league appearances and goals as of 11/11/26 @ 14:07(AEST) ‡ National team caps and goals as of 21 December 2021

Yevhen Viktorovych Korokhov (Ukrainian: Євген Вікторович Корохов; born 17 March 1998) is a Ukrainian professional footballer who plays as a right-back for Ukrainian club Viktoriya Sumy.
