= Shota Nonikashvili =

Georgian footballer

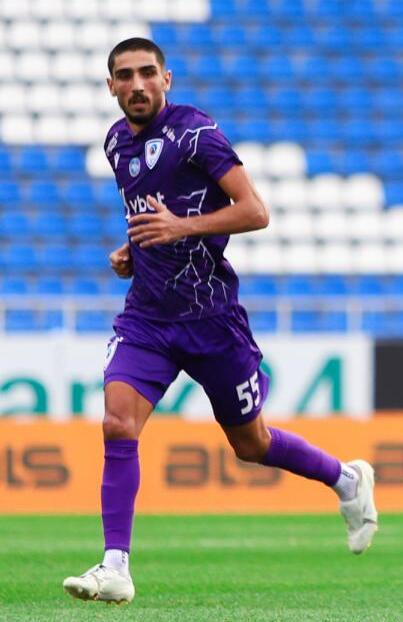
- Nonikashvili in 2024 with LNZ Cherkasy

Personal information
- Date of birth: 10 January 2001 (age 25)
- Place of birth: Tbilisi, Georgia
- Height: 1.87 m (6 ft 2 in)
- Position: Central midfielder

Team information
- Current team: LNZ Cherkasy
- Number: 5

Youth career
- Saburtalo

Senior career*
| Years | Team | Apps | (Gls) |
| 2020–2024 | Iberia 1999 | 99 | (20) |
| 2024– | LNZ Cherkasy | 39 | (4) |

International career^{‡}
| 2017–2018 | Georgia U17 | 16 | (3) |
| 2019–2020 | Georgia U19 | 12 | (0) |
| 2021–2023 | Georgia U21 | 7 | (0) |
| 2024– | Georgia | 2 | (0) |
- * Club domestic league appearances and goals as of 3 June 2026 ‡ National team caps and goals as of 7 September 2024

Shota Nonikashvili (Georgian: შოთა ნონიკაშვილი; born 10 January 2001) is a Georgian football player who plays as a central midfielder for Ukrainian Premier League club LNZ Cherkasy and the Georgia national team.

== International career ==
Nonikashvili made his debut for the Georgia national team on 7 September 2024 in a Nations League game against Czechia at the Mikheil Meskhi Stadium. He substituted Otar Kiteishvili in the 75th minute as Georgia won 4–1.
