= Mykhaylo Dyachuk-Stavytskyi =

Ukrainian footballer and manager

Personal information
- Full name: Mykhaylo Yuriyovych Dyachuk-Stavytskyi
- Date of birth: 1 January 1989 (age 37)
- Place of birth: Ukrainian SSR
- Height: 1.76 m (5 ft 9 in)
- Position: Midfielder

Team information
- Current team: Rukh Lviv U19 (assistant)

Youth career
- 2002–2006: Karpaty Lviv

Senior career*
Years	Team	Apps	(Gls)
2006–2009	Karpaty Lviv	0	(0)
2006–2008	→ Karpaty-2 Lviv	41	(2)
2009	→ Enerhetyk Burshtyn (loan)	11	(0)
2009–2010	Spartakus Szarowola	27	(4)
2010	Motor Lublin	13	(0)
2011	Enerhetyk Burshtyn	3	(0)
2012–2013	Arsenal Bila Tserkva	17	(1)
2013	Zirka Kirovohrad	1	(0)
2014–2016	Bory Borynychi (amateur)	40	(44)
2017–2019	Mykolaiv		
Total		150	(7)

Managerial career
- 2016–2017: Karpaty Lviv U21 (assistant)
- 2017: Karpaty Lviv (assistant)
- 2018–2019: Karpaty Lviv U19 (assistant)
- 2019–2022: Ahrobiznes Volochysk (assistant)
- 2023: Rukh Lviv U19
- 2023–: Rukh Lviv U19 (assistant)
- * Club domestic league appearances and goals

Mykhaylo Dyachuk-Stavytskyi (Ukrainian: Михайло Юрійович Дячук-Ставицький; born 1 January 1989) is a Ukrainian former professional footballer who played as a midfielder.

== Career ==
He is the product of the Karpaty Lviv Youth School System. Dyachuk-Stavytskyi spent his career as a player in the Ukrainian First or Second Leagues.

In July 2016, he retired as a player and became an assistant manager for Oleksandr Chyzhevskyi in the FC Karpaty Lviv Reserves and Youth Team.

== Personal life ==
He is a son of the Ukrainian footballer and manager Yuriy Dyachuk-Stavytskyi.
