= Dmytro Ledviy =

Ukrainian footballer

Personal information
- Full name: Dmytro Rostyslavovych Ledviy
- Date of birth: 26 August 2003 (age 23)
- Place of birth: Lviv, Ukraine
- Height: 1.92 m (6 ft 4 in)
- Position: Goalkeeper

Team information
- Current team: LNZ Cherkasy
- Number: 1

Youth career
- 2012–2020: Karpaty Lviv

Senior career*
Years	Team	Apps	(Gls)
2020–2025	Rukh Lviv	55	(0)
2025–	LNZ Cherkasy	5	(0)

International career^{‡}
2022	Ukraine U19	1	(0)
- * Club domestic league appearances and goals as of 19 December 2025 ‡ National team caps and goals as of 14 November 2022

Dmytro Rostyslavovych Ledviy (Ukrainian: Дмитро Ростиславович Ледвій; born 26 August 2003) is a Ukrainian professional footballer who plays as a goalkeeper for LNZ Cherkasy.

== Career ==
Born in Lviv, Ledviy is a product of the local Karpaty Lviv academy (his first coaches were Volodymyr Shcherba and Hennadiy Pohorilets).

After spending eight seasons in the Karpaty Lviv youth team and playing in the Ukrainian Premier League Reserves, he signed a contract with the Ukrainian Premier League side Rukh Lviv in September 2020. He made his debut in a home draw against Mynai on 14 November 2022.
