= Maksym Protsiv =

Ukrainian footballer

Personal information
- Full name: Maksym Serhiyovych Protsiv
- Date of birth: 7 October 2000 (age 26)
- Place of birth: Ternopil, Ukraine
- Height: 1.78 m (5 ft 10 in)
- Position: Right midfielder

Team information
- Current team: Prykarpattia Ivano-Frankivsk
- Number: 88

Youth career
- 2013–2014: DYuSSh-2 Ternopil
- 2014–2018: Ternopil

Senior career*
Years	Team	Apps	(Gls)
2018–2019	Ternopil-DYuSSh	29	(9)
2019–2023	Nyva Ternopil	106	(8)
2023–2024	Podoliany Ternopil		
2024–2025	Epitsentr Kamianets-Podilskyi	16	(1)
2025–	Prykarpattia Ivano-Frankivsk	27	(0)
- * Club domestic league appearances and goals as of 4 June 2026

Maksym Serhiyovych Protsiv (Ukrainian: Максим Сергійович Проців; born 7 October 2000) is a Ukrainian professional footballer who plays as a right midfielder for Ukrainian club Prykarpattia Ivano-Frankivsk.
