= Korytne, Chernivtsi Oblast =

Korytne Коритне Vilaucea
- Village
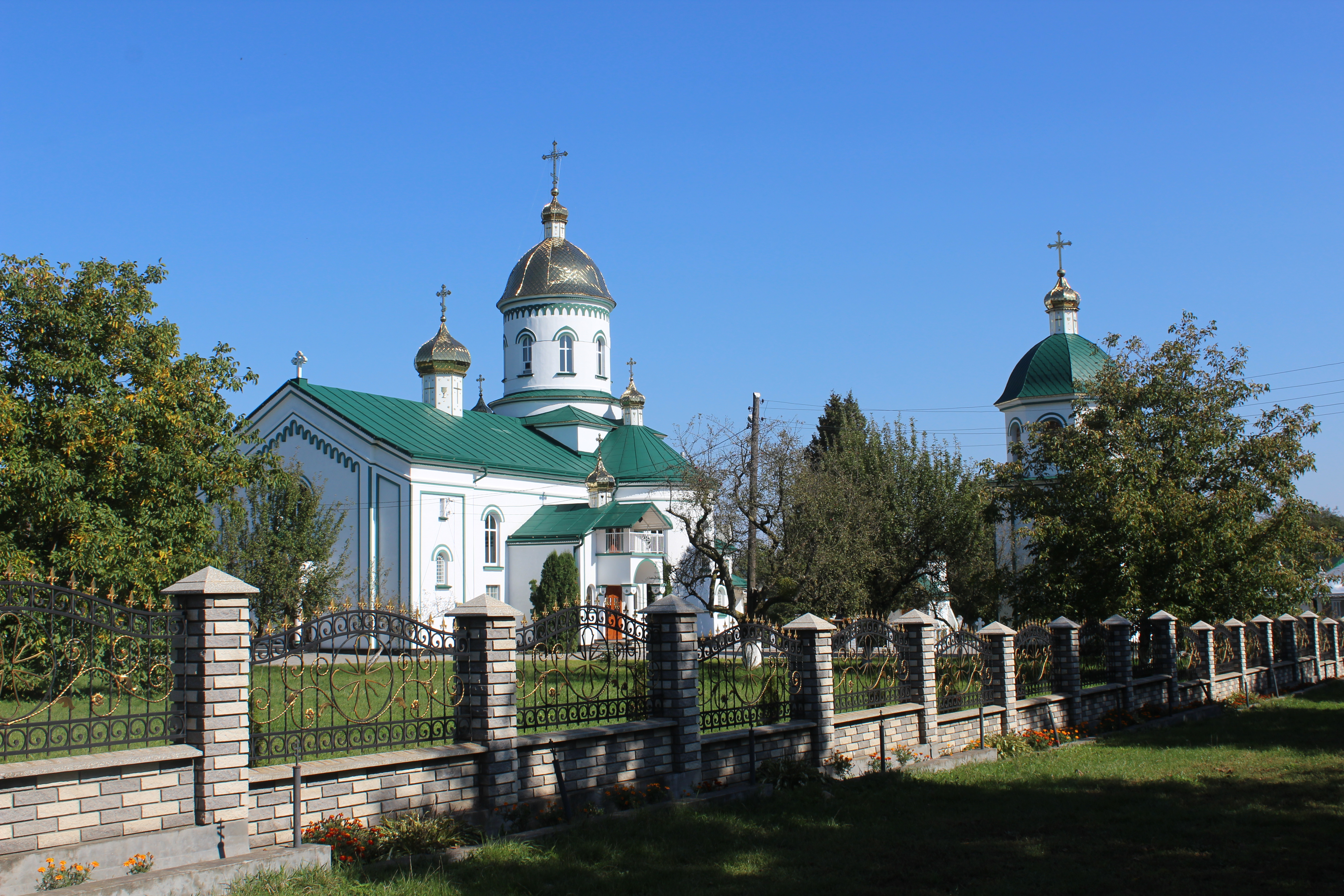
- St Nicholas' Church
- Interactive map of Korytne
- Location within Chernivtsi Oblast Location within Ukraine
- Coordinates: 48°20′01″N 25°22′31″E
- Country: Ukraine
- Oblast: Chernivtsi Oblast
- Raion: Vyzhnytsia Raion
- Hromada: Banyliv rural hromada

Area
  - Total: 30.47 km^{2} (11.76 sq mi)
- Elevation: 271 m (889 ft)

Population (2020)
  - Total: 2,396
  - Density: 78.63/km^{2} (203.7/sq mi)
- Time zone: UTC+2 (EET)
  - Summer (DST): UTC+3 (EEST)
- Postal code: 59223
- Area code: +380 3730
- KOATUU: 7320583501
- KATOTTH: UA73020010040048060

Korytne (Ukrainian: Коритне; Romanian: Vilaucea; German: Willawcze) is a village in Vyzhnytsia Raion, Chernivtsi Oblast, Ukraine. It belongs to Banyliv rural hromada, one of the hromadas of Ukraine.
