= FC LNZ Cherkasy =

LNZ Cherkasy
- Full name: Football Club LNZ Cherkasy
- Founded: 2006; 20 years ago as FC Shpola-LNZ-Lebedyn Shpola
- Ground: Cherkasy Arena
- Capacity: 10,321
- Owner: Viktor Kravchenko
- General Director: Vasyl Kayuk
- Head coach: Vitaliy Ponomaryov
- League: Ukrainian Premier League
- 2025–26: Ukrainian Premier League, 2nd of 16
- Website: fc-lnz.com
Home colours	Away colours	Third colours

Football Club LNZ Cherkasy (Ukrainian: Футбольний клуб «ЛНЗ» Черкаси) is a Ukrainian professional football club based in Cherkasy. They currently play in Ukrainian Premier League, the top tier of Ukrainian football. The club is owned by LNZ Group.

== History ==
The club was created in 2006 by Dmytro Kravchenko. The club was based at the time in the city of Shpola and played at its Central Stadium. The club's president became Andriy Poltavets in 2006.

In 2021, FC LNZ-Lebedyn announce official relocate from Lebedyn to Cherkasy and change name to LNZ Cherkasy.

In 2022–23, LNZ Cherkasy secure promotion to Ukrainian Premier League for the first time in their history from next season after defeat against Inhulets Petrove 2–1 and won aggregate 3–2.

== Names ==
- 2006–2013: FC Shpola-LNZ-Lebedyn Shpola
- 2013–2021: FC LNZ-Lebedyn Lebedyn
- 2021–present: FC LNZ Cherkasy

== Honours ==
- Ukrainian Amateur Cup
  - Winners (2): 2017–18, 2020–21
- Cherkasy Oblast Championship
  - Winners (4): 2009, 2011, 2016, 2017
  - Runners-up (2): 2007, 2012
- Cherkasy Oblast Cup
  - Runners-up (2): 2009, 2012

== Current squad ==
As of 12 September 2026

Note: Flags indicate national team as defined under FIFA eligibility rules; some limited exceptions apply. Players may hold more than one non-FIFA nationality.

No.	Pos.	Nation	Player
1	GK	UKR	Dmytro Ledviy
4	DF	ALB	Ajdi Dajko
5	MF	GEO	Shota Nonikashvili
7	FW	UKR	Artur Mykytyshyn
8	MF	NGR	Adam Yakubu
9	MF	UKR	Yehor Tverdokhlib
10	MF	KOS	Muharrem Jashari
11	MF	UKR	Hennadiy Pasich
12	GK	UKR	Oleksiy Palamarchuk
14	DF	UKR	Oleksandr Drambayev
16	MF	UKR	Artur Ryabov
17	DF	UKR	Denys Kuzyk
19	MF	UKR	Yevheniy Pastukh

No.	Pos.	Nation	Player
25	DF	UKR	Oleh Horin
29	DF	UKR	Roman Didyk
30	MF	BRA	Talles Brener
34	DF	UKR	Nazariy Muravskyi
37	FW	MTN	Papa Ndiaga Yade (on loan from Oleksandriya)
72	GK	UKR	Kirill Samoylenko
75	DF	UKR	Andriy Kitela
77	FW	ALB	Tedi Cara
90	FW	GHA	Mark Assinor
92	DF	UKR	Bohdan Slyubyk (on loan from Pardubice)
93	DF	UKR	Vitaliy Roman
99	FW	NGR	Cody David

=== Other players under contract ===
Note: Flags indicate national team as defined under FIFA eligibility rules; some limited exceptions apply. Players may hold more than one non-FIFA nationality.

No. / Pos. / Nation / Player	No. / Pos. / Nation / Player

=== Out on loan ===
Note: Flags indicate national team as defined under FIFA eligibility rules; some limited exceptions apply. Players may hold more than one non-FIFA nationality.

No.	Pos.	Nation	Player
—	DF	UKR	Illya Putrya (at Bukovyna Chernivtsi until 30 June 2027)
—	MF	UKR	Vyacheslav Tankovskyi (at Bukovyna Chernivtsi until 30 June 2027)

No.	Pos.	Nation	Player
—	FW	CRC	Jewison Bennette (at (Hungary) Győr until 30 June 2027)
—	FW	UKR	Danylo Kravchuk (at Bukovyna Chernivtsi until 30 June 2027)

== International players ==
Had international caps for their respective countries. Players whose name is listed in bold represented their countries while playing for LNZ Cherkasy.

Ukraine

- (Ukraine) Ivan Kalyuzhnyi
- (Ukraine) Oleksandr Kovpak
- (Ukraine) Denys Oliynyk
- (Ukraine) Serhiy Rybalka
- (Ukraine) Yevhen Selin

Europe

- (Albania) Tedi Cara
- (Azerbaijan) Andriy Popovych
- (Georgia (country)) **Shota Nonikashvili**
- (Israel) Osama Khalaila
- (Kosovo) **Muharrem Jashari**
- (Luxembourg) **Olivier Thill**

Africa

- (Mauritania) Papa Ndiaga Yade
- (Republic of the Congo) Béni Makouana

North America

- (Costa Rica) **Jewison Bennette**

== Coaches and administration ==
Office administration	Coaching (senior team)	Office assistants	Coaching (U-19 team)
President – (Ukraine) Viktor Kravchenko; Vice-president – (Ukraine) Dmytro Kravchenko; General director – (Ukraine) Vasyl Kayuk; Technical director – (Ukraine) Oleksandr Chaban; Operational director – (Ukraine) Bohdan Zhalo; Chief scout – (Ukraine) Oleksiy Snizhko; Marketing and media director – (Ukraine) Anton Kravchenko; Commercial director – (Ukraine) Denys Karaban	Head coach – (Ukraine) Vitaliy Ponomaryov; Assistant manager – (Ukraine) Hennadiy Shchekotylin; Assistant manager – (Ukraine) Ivan Shuha; Assistant manager – (Ukraine) Mykhaylo Dyachuk-Stavytskyi; Goalkeeping coach – (Ukraine) Andriy Rad; Fitness coach – (Ukraine) Vitaliy Romanyuk; Fitness coach – (Ukraine) Andriy Burdiyan; Analysts – (Ukraine) Maryan Shevchuk; Analysts – (Ukraine) Taras Dmytryk	Security officer – (Ukraine) Ruslan Lysenko; Administrator – (Ukraine) Andriy Kalinich; Administrator – (Ukraine) Oleksandr Khlyubko; Administrator – (Ukraine) Oleksandr Parfyonov; Administrator – (Ukraine) Dmytro Sydorenko; Chief doctor – (Ukraine) Leonid Maslyuk; Rehabilitation doctor – (Ukraine) Roman Mishchenko; Masseur – (Ukraine) Andriy Makhno; Masseur – (Ukraine) Ruslan Poturnak; Masseur – (Ukraine) Oleksandr Pytel; Masseur – (Ukraine) Oleksandr Sokolovskyi; Rehabilitation specialist – (Ukraine) Artur Pohorilyi; SMM officer, photographer – (Ukraine) Oleksandr Kononenko; Videographer – (Ukraine) Serhiy Presnyakov	Head coach – (Ukraine) Mykhaylo Dyachuk-Stavytskyi; Assistant manager – (Ukraine) Serhiy Politylo; Assistant manager – (Ukraine) Andriy Hlushchenko; Goalkeeping coach – (Ukraine) Vadym Bozhenko; Administrator – (Ukraine) Yevhen Trymbachov; Analysts – (Ukraine) Vladyslav Kravchenko; Masseur – (Ukraine) Illia Karbovskyi

== League and cup history ==
Season	Div.	Pos.	Pl.	W	D	L	GS	GA	P	Cup	Other		Notes
2017–18	Cherkasy Oblast competitions										A/C	Winner	-
2018–19	**4th**(Amatorska Liha)	**1**_{/12}	22	18	3	1	67	15	**57**	Second Preliminary round (1/32)	A/P	1/2 finals	-
2018–19	**4th**(Amatorska Liha)	**1**_{/12}	22	18	3	1	67	15	**57**	Second Preliminary round (1/32)	A/C	1/4 finals	-
2019–20	**4th**(Amatorska Liha)	**2**_{/12}	22	17	4	1	54	13	**55**	-	A/P	1/2 finals	-
2019–20	**4th**(Amatorska Liha)	**2**_{/12}	22	17	4	1	54	13	**55**	-	A/C	1/4 finals	-
2020–21	**4th**(Amatorska Liha)	**2**_{/11}	20	14	3	3	56	11	**45**	-	A/P	Winner	**Promoted to Ukrainian Second League**
2020–21	**4th**(Amatorska Liha)	**2**_{/11}	20	14	3	3	56	11	**45**	-	A/C	Winner	**Promoted to Ukrainian Second League**
2021–22	**3rd**(Druha Liha "A")	**3**_{/15}	17	13	2	2	36	9	**41**	Round of 16 (1/8)	-	-	**Promoted to Ukrainian First League**
2022–23	**2nd**(Persha Liha "A")	**1**_{/8}	14	9	3	2	22	6	**30**	—	-	-	to Promotion group
2022–23	**2nd**(Persha Liha "A")	**3**_{/8}	14	6	4	4	19	12	**22**	—	-	-	Won playoffs Inhulets Petrove 1–1 2–1/ **Promoted to Ukrainian Premier League**
2023-24	**1st**(Premier Liha)	**7**	30	11	8	11	31	34	**41**	Fourth preliminary round (1/16)	-	-	-
2024-25	**1st**(Premier Liha)	**12**	30	7	10	13	25	37	**31**	Round of 16 (1/8)	-	-	-
2025–26	**1st**(Premier Liha)	**2**	30	18	6	6	39	17	**60**	Quarter-finals (1/4)	-	-	-
2026–27	**1st**(Premier Liha)	8	3	1	1	1	2	3	4	Round of 16 (1/8)	2026–27 UEFA Conference League	Second qualifying round	-

- A/P – the AAFU league playoffs (post-season elimination)
- A/C – the Ukrainian Amateur Cup
- 2021–22 season was interrupted and discontinued due to the 2022 Russian full-scale invasion of Ukraine
- 2022–23 Ukrainian Cup competitions never took place due to ongoing hostilities

== European record ==
Competition	Played	Won	Draw	Lost	GF	GA	GD	Win%
UEFA Conference League	2	0	2	0	0	0	+0	0.00
Total	**2**	**0**	**2**	**0**	**0**	**0**	**+0**	**0.00**

Season	Competition	Round	Opposition	Neutral (~~Home~~)	Away	Aggregate
2026–27	Conference League	Second qualifying round	(Belgium) Gent	0–0 Pl	0–0	**0–0** (2−4 p)

Note: Pl - Płock, Poland

== Managers ==
- (Ukraine) Petro Slavinskyi (2006 – 2011)
- (Ukraine) Vasyl Hrechanyi (2012 – 16 August 2020)
- (Ukraine) Yuriy Bakalov (17 August 2020 – 5 September 2022)
- (Ukraine) Oleksandr Kovpak (caretaker) (5 September 2022 – 1 December 2022)
- (Ukraine) Oleksandr Kovpak (2 December 2022 – 23 August 2023)
- (Ukraine) Yuriy Dudnyk (caretaker) (25 August 2023 – 29 August 2023)
- (Belarus) Oleg Dulub (30 August 2023 – 10 June 2024)
- (Spain) Andrés Carrasco (11 June 2024 – 12 December 2024)
- (Ukraine) Roman Hryhorchuk (18 December 2024 – 26 May 2025)
- (Ukraine) Vitaliy Ponomaryov (5 June 2025 – present)

== See also ==
- FC Viktoriya Mykolaivka
