= Yakiv Kinareykin =

Ukrainian footballer (born 2003)

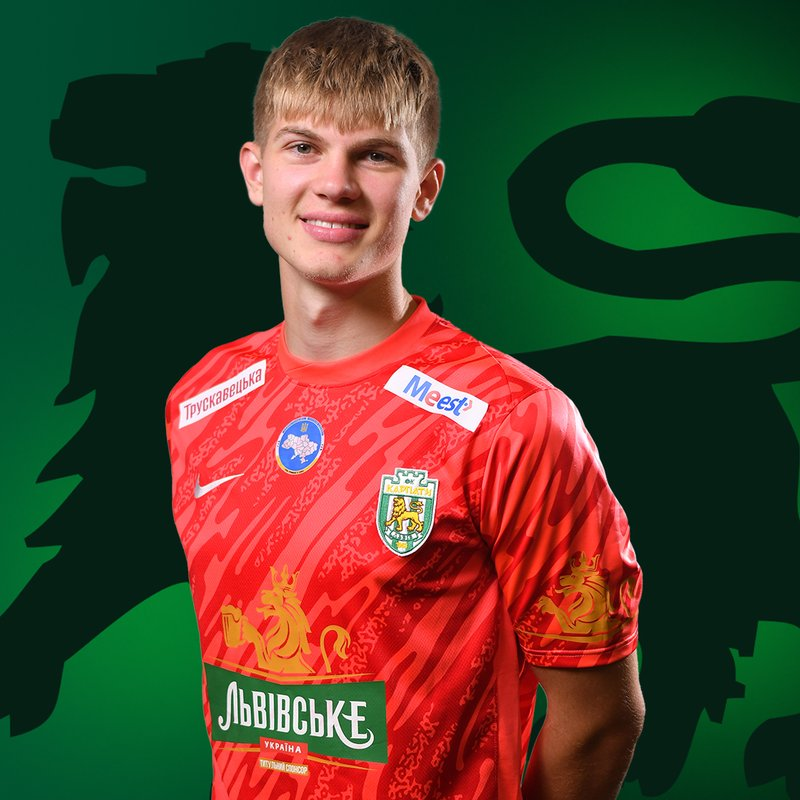

Personal information
- Full name: Yakiv Dmytrovych Kinareykin
- Date of birth: 22 October 2003 (age 23)
- Place of birth: Kharkiv, Ukraine
- Height: 1.90 m (6 ft 3 in)
- Position: Goalkeeper

Team information
- Current team: Villarreal B
- Number: 25

Youth career
- 2013–2018: Metalist Kharkiv
- 2018–2020: Meteor Prague
- 2020–2021: Dnipro-1

Senior career*
| Years | Team | Apps | (Gls) |
| 2021–2024 | Dnipro-1 | 8 | (0) |
| 2024–2025 | Karpaty Lviv | 13 | (0) |
| 2025– | Villarreal B | 4 | (0) |

International career^{‡}
| 2022–2024 | Ukraine U21 | 2 | (0) |
- * Club domestic league appearances and goals as of 25 May 2026 ‡ National team caps and goals as of 19 June 2025

Yakiv Dmytrovych Kinareykin (Ukrainian: Яків Дмитрович Кінарейкін; born 22 October 2003) is a Ukrainian professional footballer who plays as a goalkeeper for Villarreal B.

== Club career ==
Kinareykin is a product of the Metalist Kharkiv and Dnipro-1 academies.

Kinareykin made his debut for Dnipro-1 on 25 July 2023, playing as a first choice goalkeeper in a losing match against Greek club Panathinaikos in the 2023–24 UEFA Champions League qualifying phase round.

== International career ==
In November 2022, Kinareykin was called up for the first time to the Ukraine under-21 team as a main squad player, ahead of friendly matches vs Israel under-21 and Georgia under-21.
