= Yevhen Pidlepenets =

Ukrainian footballer

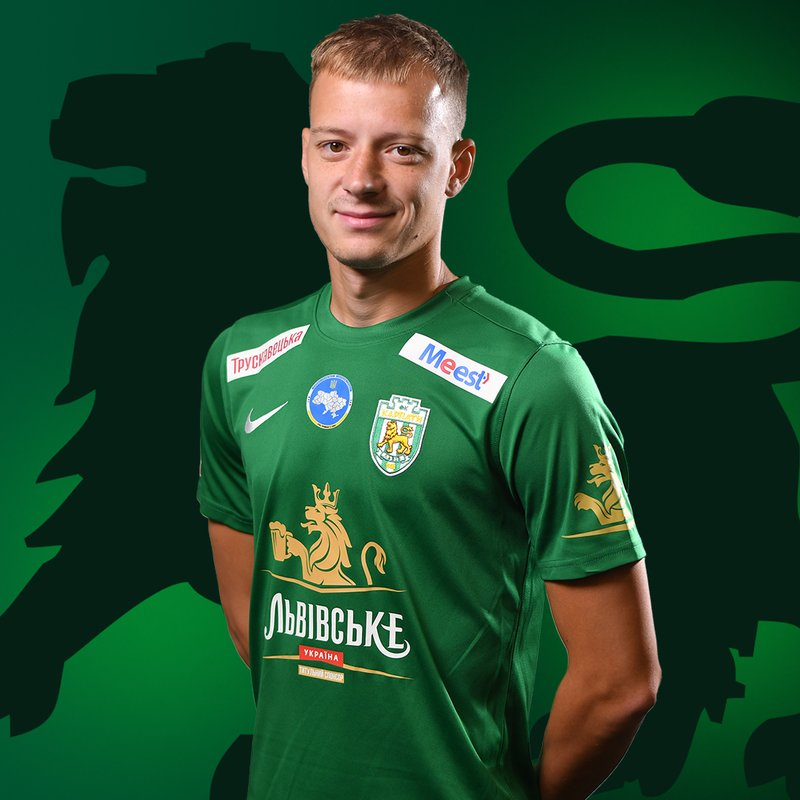

Personal information
- Full name: Yevhen Hennadiyovych Pidlepenets
- Date of birth: 10 November 1998 (age 28)
- Place of birth: Tokmak, Ukraine
- Height: 1.83 m (6 ft 0 in)
- Position: Right winger

Team information
- Current team: Bukovyna Chernivtsi
- Number: 12

Youth career
- 2013–2016: Metalurh Zaporizhzhia
- 2016: Oleksandriya
- 2017: Munkach Mukachevo

Senior career*
Years	Team	Apps	(Gls)
2017–2019	Metalurh Zaporizhzhia	35	(8)
2019–2020	Deportivo Fabril	7	(1)
2020–2021	Metalurh Zaporizhzhia	6	(3)
2021–2023	Metalist Kharkiv	44	(12)
2023	→ Dnipro-1 (loan)	8	(1)
2023–2025	Karpaty Lviv	48	(8)
2025–	Bukovyna Chernivtsi	29	(8)
- * Club domestic league appearances and goals as of 3 June 2026

Yevhen Hennadiyovych Pidlepenets (Ukrainian: Євген Геннадійович Підлепенець; born 10 November 1998) is a Ukrainian professional footballer who plays as a right winger for Bukovyna Chernivtsi.

Native of Tokmak, Pidlepenets is a product of the Zaporizhian Oblast flagman of football Metalurh originally, yet also of such clubs like Oleksandriya and Munkacs. In 2015–16 he competed for original Metalurh Zaporizhia reserve team in the UPL competitions for reserves (U-19) and following the club's bankruptcy for Oleksandriya reserve team. In 2017 the Zaporizhia city authorities restored Metalurh and he rejoined Metalurh Zaporizhia in amateur competitions. The club was readmitted to professional competitions in 2018 and Pidlepenets made his official debut at professional level on 22 July 2018 in the away match against FC Real Pharma Odesa. That season he played 20 regular league games as well as both play-off games. During the summer break Pidlepenets signed a contract with Deportivo La Coruna reserve team, Fabril, but did not stay there for too long. In 2020 he returned to Zaporizhia where only played 6 games and during the winter break signed with the revived Metalist Kharkiv, originally Metal Kharkiv.

At the Ukrainian Premier League Pidlepenets made his debut on the Ukrainian Independence Day (24 August) during the 2022–23 season when in the away match against FC Rukh Lviv he opened the match score.
