= Artur Ryabov =

Ukrainian footballer

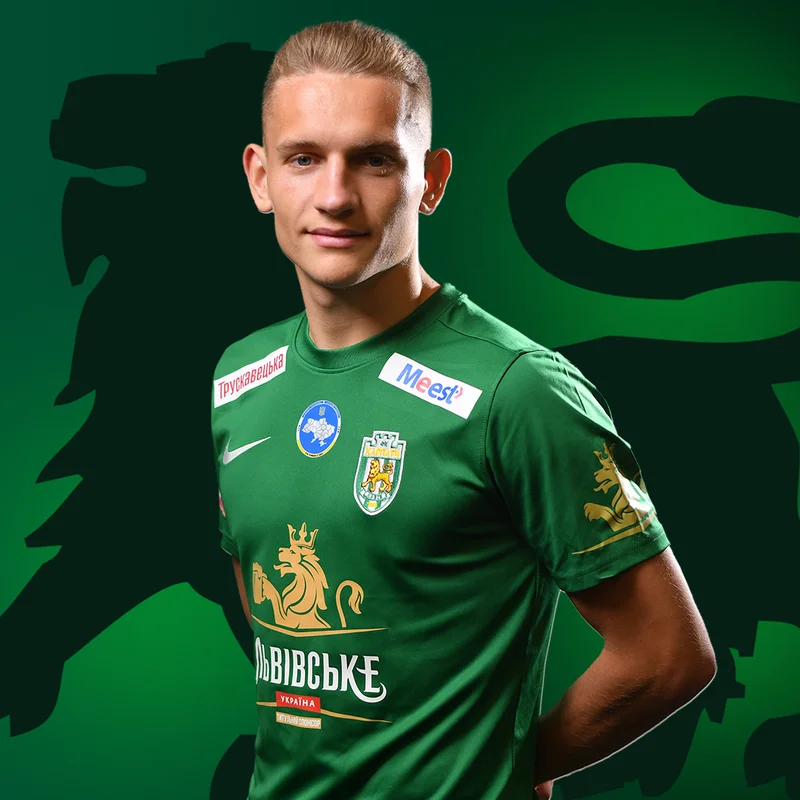

Personal information
- Full name: Artur Andriyovych Ryabov
- Date of birth: 20 August 2000 (age 26)
- Place of birth: Komarno, Ukraine
- Height: 1.72 m (5 ft 8 in)
- Position: Central midfielder

Team information
- Current team: LNZ Cherkasy
- Number: 16

Youth career
- 2011–2013: Lviv
- 2013–2017: VIK-Volyn Volodymyr-Volynskyi
- 2017–2018: Munkach Mukachevo
- 2018: Volyn Lutsk

Senior career*
Years	Team	Apps	(Gls)
2018–2022	Volyn Lutsk	68	(3)
2020	→ Volyn-2 Lutsk	2	(0)
2022–2025	Karpaty Lviv	50	(5)
2025	Rukh Lviv	12	(1)
2025–	LNZ Cherkasy	28	(2)
- * Club domestic league appearances and goals as of 3 June 2026

Artur Andriyovych Ryabov (Ukrainian: Артур Андрійович Рябов; born 20 August 2000) is a Ukrainian professional footballer who plays as a central midfielder for Ukrainian club LNZ Cherkasy.
