= 2023–24 Ukrainian Cup =

Tournament details
- Country: Ukraine
- Dates: 29 July 2023–15 May 2024; 29 July 2023–23 August 2023 (preliminary rounds); 27 September 2023–15 May 2024 (main event)
- Teams: 51

Final positions
- Champions: Shakhtar Donetsk (14th title)
- Runners-up: Vorskla Poltava
- Semifinalists: Polissya Zhytomyr; Chornomorets Odesa

Tournament statistics
- Matches played: 49
- Goals scored: 137 (2.8 per match)
- Attendance: 5,601 (114 per match)
- Top goal scorer(s): Dmytro Kulyk; Andriy Shtohrin (4 goals)
- All statistics correct as of 15 May 2024. 3 out of 49 matches had spectators

The 2023–24 Ukrainian Cup was the 32nd annual season of Ukraine's football knockout competition. The competition began on 29 July 2023 and concluded on 15 May 2024 with the final. The competition has been resumed after being paused for a season due to the Russian invasion of Ukraine and an attempt to resume league competitions. In the fall of last year (2022), there was information about the possibility of resuming cup competitions in the spring (2023), but the idea was never realized.

Due to security concerns on 1 December 2023, the government of Ukraine established recommendations related to allowing spectators at stadiums. As result, attendance was permitted only in the spring of 2024 and was limited.

All competition rounds consisted of a single game with a home field advantage granted to a team from lower league. Draw for all the rounds was blind. Qualification for the competition was granted to all professional clubs and four better performers of 2 last amateur seasons the 2022–23 Ukrainian Amateur Cup and the 2021–22 Ukrainian Amateur Cup.

== Team allocation and schedule ==
The competition includes all professional first teams from the Premier League (16/16 teams of the league), First League (20/20), Second League (11/15) and four best performer from the previous year's Amateur Cup. Four second club teams from the Second League are not eligible for the tournament.

Distribution
	Teams entering in this round	Teams advancing from previous round
First preliminary round (6 teams)	2 entrants from the Second League; 4 entrants of the 2022–23 Amateur Cup	
Second preliminary round (32 teams)	9 entrants from the Second League; 20 entrants from the First League	3 winners from the First preliminary round
Third preliminary round (16 teams)	(no new entrants)	16 winners from the Second preliminary round
Fourth preliminary round (16 teams)	8 entrants from the Premier League	8 winners from the Third preliminary round
Round of 16 (16 teams)	8 entrants from the Premier League	8 winners from the Fourth preliminary round

=== Rounds schedule ===
Phase	Round	Number of fixtures	Clubs remaining	Draw date	Game date
Preliminary	First round	3	6 → 3	21 July 2023	29 July 2023
Preliminary	Second round	16	32 → 16	21 July 2023	2 August 2023
Preliminary	Third round	8	16 → 8	4 August 2023	15 August 2023
Preliminary	Fourth round	8	16 → 8	17 August 2023	23 August 2023
Main event	Round of 16	8	16 → 8	31 August 2023	27 September 2023
Main event	Quarter-finals	4	8 → 4	13 October 2023	1 November 2023
Main event	Semi-finals	2	4 → 2	29 January 2024	3 April 2024
Main event	Final	1	2 → 1	29 January 2024	15 May 2024

=== Teams ===
Enter in First Round		Enter in Second Round		Enter in Fourth Round	Enter in Round of 16
AAFU; 4 teams	PFL League 2; 2/15 teams	PFL League 2; 9/15 teams	PFL League 1; 20/20 teams	UPL; 8/16 teams	UPL; 8/16 teams
Fazenda Chernivtsi*; FC Mykolaiv*; Olympia Savyntsi; Shturm Ivankiv*	FC Kudrivka*; UCSA Tarasivka*	Chaika Petropavlivska Borshchahivka; Druzhba Myrivka*; Lokomotyv Kyiv*; Nyva Vinnytsia; Real Pharma Odesa; Skala 1911 Stryi*; FC Trostianets; Vast Mykolaiv; PFC Zviahel	Ahrobiznes Volochysk; Bukovyna Chernivtsi; FC Chernihiv; Dinaz Vyshhorod; Epitsentr Kamianets-Podilskyi; Hirnyk-Sport; Inhulets Petrove; Karpaty Lviv; FC Khust; Kremin Kremenchuk; Livyi Bereh Kyiv; FSC Mariupol; Metalist Kharkiv; Metalurh Zaporizhia; Nyva Buzova; Nyva Ternopil; Podillya Khmelnytskyi; SC Poltava; Prykarpattia Ivano-Frankivsk; Viktoriya Sumy	Chornomorets Odesa; Kolos Kovalivka; LNZ Cherkasy; Metalist 1925 Kharkiv; Obolon Kyiv; Polissya Zhytomyr; Rukh Lviv; Veres Rivne	SC Dnipro-1; Dynamo Kyiv; Kryvbas Kryvyi Rih; FC Mynai; FC Oleksandriya; Shakhtar Donetsk; Vorskla Poltava; Zorya Luhansk

Notes:

- With the asterisk (*) are noted the Second League teams that were recently admitted to the league from amateurs and the AAFU (amateur) team(s) that qualified in place of the Amateur Cup finalist(s).
- Since there was no competition held last season due to hostilities, for this season the Ukrainian Association of Football approved qualification of four teams from the Ukrainian Amateur Cup, two from 2021–22 season and two from 2022–23. Now, the 2021–22 season stopped at the semifinal stage. From 2021–22 season qualified Olympia Savyntsi and Mykolaiv (the other two semifinalists were Druzhba Myrivka that already qualified as a professional, and Motor Zaporizhia was dissolved in January 2023), now since both finalists of the 2022–23 season qualified, the 2022–23 spot was filled with losing semifinalists Shturm Ivankiv and Fazenda Chernivtsi. Technically, none of the AAFU representatives qualified as the Amateur Cup finalists, although Olympiya Savyntsi reached a final, their awarded quota was for previous season when they stopped at semifinals.
- Four reserve teams from the PFL League 2 were not eligible to participate.

== Bracket ==
The following is the tournament bracket that the main stage of the Ukrainian Cup resembles. Numbers in parentheses next to the match score represent the results of a penalty shoot-out.

Fourth round 23 August 2023
23 August 2023
Ahrobiznes Volochysk	0
Polissia Zhytomyr	2
23 August 2023
Skala 1911 Stryi	0
Rukh Lviv	2
23 August 2023
Hirnyk-Sport Horishni Plavni	1
Metalist 1925 Kharkiv	3
23 August 2023
PFC Zviahel	0
Obolon Kyiv	1
23 August 2023
Epitsentr Kamianets-Podilskyi	1
Veres Rivne	3
23 August 2023
LNZ Cherkasy	0
Viktoriya Sumy	1
23 August 2023
Livyi Bereh Kyiv	1
Chornomorets Odesa (a.e.t.)	2
23 August 2023
FSC Mariupol (p)	2 (5)
Kolos Kovalivka	2 (4)

Round of 16; 26–27 September 2023
27 September 2023
Polissia Zhytomyr (p)	1 (5)
SC Dnipro-1	1 (4)
26 September 2023
Rukh Lviv	0
FC Oleksandriya	1
27 September 2023
Metalist 1925 Kharkiv	0
Vorskla Poltava	3
27 September 2023
Obolon Kyiv	1
Dynamo Kyiv	0
26 September 2023
Veres Rivne	0
Shakhtar Donetsk	3
27 September 2023
Viktoriya Sumy	1
FC Mynai	0
27 September 2023
Chornomorets Odesa	2
Kryvbas Kryvyi Rih	1
12 October 2023
FSC Mariupol	0
Zorya Luhansk	1

Quarter-finals; 1-2 November 2023
2 November 2023
Polissia Zhytomyr (p)	0 (4)
FC Oleksandriya	0 (3)
2 November 2023
Obolon Kyiv	0
Vorskla Poltava	3
30 October 2023
FC Viktoriya Sumy	0
Shakhtar Donetsk	3
1 November 2023
Chornomorets Odesa	4
Zorya Luhansk	1

Semi-finals; 3 April 2024
3 April 2024
Polissia Zhytomyr	0
Vorskla Poltava	1
3 April 2024
Shakhtar Donetsk	4
Chornomorets Odesa	1

Final; 15 May 2024
15 May 2024
Vorskla Poltava	1
Shakhtar Donetsk	2

== Competition schedule ==
Legends: AM – AAFU (amateur) competitions (IV tier), 2L – Second League (III tier), 1L – First League (II tier), PL – Premier League (I tier)

=== First preliminary round (1/128) ===
In this round, 2 clubs from the Second League and four clubs of the 2022–23 Ukrainian Amateur Cup and the 2021–22 Ukrainian Amateur Cup entered the competition.

The draw was held on 21 July 2023.

29 July 2023	Mykolaiv (AM)	6–1	(AM) Fazenda Chernivtsi	Mykolaiv, Lviv Oblast
17:00	Klym 22'; Ivanyshyn 40'; Kachor 49'; Kozlovskyi 58', 80'; Fedyna 65'	Report	90+1' Solomyan	Stadium: Miskyi; Referee: A.Shevchuk (Volyn Oblast)

29 July 2023	Olimpiya Savyntsi (AM)	0–1	(2L) Kudrivka	Myrhorod, Poltava Oblast
14:00	Malyk 8' (o.g.)	Report		Stadium: Start; Referee: S.Dubykivskyi (Kyiv Oblast)

29 July 2023	Shturm Ivankiv (AM)	1–1 (a.e.t.) (4–5 p)	(2L) UCSA Tarasivka	Kyiv
17:00	Lysenko 70'	Report	82' Yuvkhymets	Stadium: Dynamo Training Center; Referee: V.Solovyov (Odesa)
	Penalties
	Volkov (penalty scored); Lyubko (penalty missed); Starhorodskyi (penalty scored); Lysenko (penalty scored); Ichanskyi (penalty scored); Porodko (penalty missed)		(penalty scored) Makhnyev; (penalty scored) Kononov; (penalty missed) Dumanyuk; (penalty scored) Kharchenko; (penalty scored) Synyohub; (penalty scored) Beyer

=== Second preliminary round (1/64) ===
In this round, 9 clubs from the Second League and 20 clubs from the First League entered the competition and joined the 3 winners of the First preliminary round (2 clubs from Second League, 1 – amateurs).

2 August 2023	Prykarpattia Ivano-Frankivsk (1L)	2–1	(1L) Karpaty Lviv	Ivano-Frankivsk
	Radulskyi 25', 73'; Popchuk (penalty missed) 43'	[ Report]	82' Halenkov	Stadium: Rukh; Referee: O.Kohut (Ternopil)

2 August 2023	Metalist Kharkiv (1L)	1–2	(1L) Epitsentr Kamianets-Podilskyi	Uzhhorod
	Teplyakov 58'	[ Report]	49', 71' Bezhenar	Stadium: Avanhard; Referee: O.Tytov (Donetsk)

2 August 2023	Skala 1911 Stryi (2L)	5–2	(1L) Khust	Stryi, Lviv Oblast
	Averyanov 2', 47'; Pastukh 36', 85'; Mazur 22'	[ Report]	57' V.Lutsiv; 90+2' P.Lutsiv	Stadium: Sokil; Referee: M.Lypko (Ivano-Frankivsk)

2 August 2023	Podillya Khmelnytskyi (1L)	0–0 (a.e.t.) (2–3 p)	(1L) Nyva Ternopil	Khmelnytskyi
		[ Report]		Stadium: Podillia; Referee: Ya.Leskiv (Lviv Oblast)
	Penalties
	Zadoya (penalty scored); Bykov (penalty missed); Bozhenar (penalty scored); Savchuk (penalty missed); Vasylenko (penalty missed)		(penalty missed) Zin; (penalty scored) Haladey; (penalty missed) Demchuk; (penalty scored) Bey; (penalty scored) Malashchuk

2 August 2023	Nyva Vinnytsia (2L)	0–1 (a.e.t.)	(1L) Ahrobiznes Volochysk	Vinnytsia
		[ Report]	104' (pen.) Tolochko	Stadium: Tsentralnyi Miskyi; Referee: Ye.Kyevlich (Kropyvnytskyi)

2 August 2023	Mykolaiv (AM)	1–0	(1L) Bukovyna Chernivtsi	Mykolaiv, Lviv Oblast
	Tsyupka 52'	[ Report]		Stadium: Miskyi; Referee: V.Malyar (Khmelnytskyi)

2 August 2023	Hirnyk-Sport Horishni Plavni (1L)	1–0 (a.e.t.)	(1L) Poltava	Horishni Plavni, Poltava Oblast
	Molko 110'	[ Report]		Stadium: Yunist; Referee: Ye.Tsybulko (Cherkasy Oblast)

2 August 2023	Inhulets Petrove (1L)	4–3	(1L) Metalurh Zaporizhzhia	Petrove, Kirovohrad Oblast
	Kvasov 9', 30', 69'; Rezepov 31'	[ Report]	41' Tolok; 45' Kuralekh; 80' Halata	Stadium: Inhulets; Referee: V.Zaprutnyak (Vinnytsia)

2 August 2023	Kudrivka (2L)	3–0	(1L) Kremin Kremenchuk	Chernihiv
	Kulyk 16', 62'; Koval 88'	[ Report]		Stadium: Yunist Stadium; Referee: K.Usova (Kyiv Oblast)

2 August 2023	Zviahel (2L)	5–0	(2L) Chaika Petropavlivska Borshchahivka	Zviahel, Zhytomyr Oblast
	Volynets 8'; Maytak 67'; Vashchyshyn 71', 90+2'; Nesterov 90'	[ Report]		Stadium: Avanhard; Referee: S.Podryhulia (Lutsk)

2 August 2023	UCSA Tarasivka (2L)	1–1 (a.e.t.) (4–3 p)	(1L) Nyva Buzova	Kyiv
	Kos 59'	[ Report]	84' (pen.) Palamar	Stadium: Bannikov; Referee: D.Osaulenko (Poltava)
	Penalties
	Makhnyev (penalty scored); Kononov (penalty missed); Yevdokymov (penalty scored); Kharchenko (penalty scored); Synyohub (penalty scored)		(penalty scored) Serhiychuk; (penalty missed) Knysh; (penalty scored) Prokopchuk; (penalty scored) Palamar; (penalty missed) Korokhov

2 August 2023	Chernihiv (1L)	1–2	(1L) Livyi Bereh Kyiv	Chernihiv
	Koydan 19'	[ Report]	35' Lytovchenko; 50' Vakulenko	Stadium: Yunist Stadium; Referee: A.Mykhailyuk (Zhytomyr)

2 August 2023	Vast Mykolaiv (2L)	2–5	(1L) Mariupol	Boryspil, Kyiv Oblast
	Studenko 56'; Shyryaev 80'	[ Report]	5', 28', 33' Batalskyi; 83' (pen.) Lityuk; 89' Petrovskyi	Stadium: Kolos; Referee: M.Firsov (Rivne)

2 August 2023	Druzhba Myrivka (2L)	1–2	(1L) Viktoriya Sumy	Kaharlyk, Kyiv Oblast
	Somov 19'	[ Report]	70' Sasovskyi; 80' Nelin	Stadium: Druzhba; Referee: M.Bohatyr (Zaporizhia)

3 August 2023	Lokomotyv Kyiv (2L)	1–0	(1L) Dinaz Vyshhorod	Kyiv
	Sakhnyuk 56'	[ Report]		Stadium: Bannikov; Referee: D.Kuzovlyev (Zaporizhia)

Trostianets (2L)	+ / -	(2L) Real Pharma Odesa	Trostianets, Sumy Oblast
	Report		Stadium: imeni Kutsa

=== Third preliminary round (1/32) ===
In this round, the 16 winners of the Second preliminary round participate (8 clubs from First League, 7 clubs from Second League, 1 – amateurs).

The draw was held on 4 August 2023.

15 August 2023	Kudrivka (2L)	2–2 (a.e.t.) (6–7 p)	(1L) Mariupol	Kudrivka, Chernihiv Oblast
13:00	Kulyk 4', 74'	Report	48', 82' (pen.) Penteleychuk	Stadium: Kudrivka Arena; Referee: O.Kohut (Ternopil)
	Penalties
	Plastun (penalty scored); Strochyskyi (penalty scored); Chepurnenko (penalty scored); Skepskyi (penalty missed); Rudenko (penalty scored); Leshchenko (penalty scored); Teteruk (penalty scored); Kovalenko (penalty missed)		(penalty scored) Penteleychuk; (penalty scored) Mochevinskyi; (penalty scored) Mamrosenko; (penalty scored) Batalskyi; (penalty missed) Tyeryekhov; (penalty scored) Makhynya; (penalty scored) Bykovskyi; (penalty scored) Melnychenko

15 August 2023	Prykarpattia Ivano-Frankivsk (1L)	1–2	(1L) Epitsentr Kamianets-Podilskyi	Ivano-Frankivsk
15:00	Frantsuz 88' (pen.)	Report	22' Bendera; 76' Moroz	Stadium: Rukh; Referee: Ye.Tsybulko (Cherkasy Oblast)

15 August 2023	Zviahel (2L)	4–0	(2L) UCSA Tarasivka	Zviahel, Zhytomyr Oblast
15:00	Ndukve 4'; Vashchyshyn 25' (pen.); Fesenko 27'; Orynchak 78'	Report		Stadium: Avanhard; Referee: S.Lapko (Lviv)

15 August 2023	Trostianets (2L)	1–2	(1L) Hirnyk-Sport Horishni Plavni	Trostianets, Sumy Oblast
15:00	Slipukhin 63'	Report	53' Nyzhnyk; 90+3' Hora	Stadium: imeni Kutsa; Referee: Ye.Kyevlich (Kropyvnytskyi)

15 August 2023	Lokomotyv Kyiv (2L)	0–2	(1L) Livyi Bereh Kyiv	Kyiv
16:00	Arutyunian (yellow card) 56' (red card) 75'	Report	7' Lytovchenko; 70' Voytsekhovskyi	Stadium: Bannikov; Referee: D.Kubriak (Odesa)

15 August 2023	Inhulets Petrove (1L)	0–1	(1L) Viktoriya Sumy	Petrove, Kirovohrad Oblast
16:00		Report	19' Dolinskyi	Stadium: Inhulets; Referee: A.Mykhailyuk (Zhytomyr)

15 August 2023	Mykolaiv (AM)	1–3 (a.e.t.)	(1L) Ahrobiznes Volochysk	Mykolaiv, Lviv Oblast
17:00	Tsyupka 50'; Tsyupka (penalty missed) 90+4'	Report	8' Volkov; 105' Ravlyk; 120' Kuzmyn	Stadium: Miskyi; Referee: M.Lypko (Ivano-Frankivsk)

16 August 2023	Skala 1911 Stryi (2L)	2–1 (a.e.t.)	(1L) Nyva Ternopil	Stryi, Lviv Oblast
16:00	Lukyachenko 90+1'; Nykolyshyn 120'	Report	58' Khrustavka	Stadium: Sokil; Referee: V. Zaprutnyak (Vinnytsia)

- Notes:

=== Fourth preliminary round (1/16) ===
In this round, 8 clubs from the Premier League will enter the competition and the 8 winners of the Third preliminary round (6 clubs from First League and 2 clubs from Second League).

23 August 2023	Skala 1911 Stryi (2L)	0–2	(PL) Rukh Lviv	Stryi, Lviv Oblast
	Petryk (yellow card) 65' (yellow-red card) 89'	[ Report]	Kvasnytsya 16'; Stolyarchuk 70'	Stadium: Sokil; Referee: O.Afanasyev (Kharkiv)

23 August 2023	Ahrobiznes Volochysk (1L)	0–2	(PL) Polissya Zhytomyr	Volochysk, Khmelnytskyi Oblast
		[ Report]	Yanakov 38'; Budkivskyi 82'	Stadium: Yunist; Referee: S.Zadyran (Kyiv Oblast)

23 August 2023	Epitsentr Kamianets-Podilskyi (1L)	1–3	(PL) Veres Rivne	Kamianets-Podilskyi, Khmelnytskyi Oblast
	Sten 87'	[ Report]	Hayduchyk 44'; Sharay 45+1', 90+4'	Stadium: imeni Tonkocheyeva; Referee: M.Raida (Zakarapattia Oblast)

23 August 2023	Mariupol (1L)	2–2 (a.e.t.) (5–4 p)	(PL) Kolos Kovalivka	Boryspil, Kyiv Oblast
	Zubkov 20'; Litiuk 115' (pen.); Chernetskyi (yellow card) 94' (yellow-red card) 106'	[ Report]	Salabay 29'; Milko 105+2' (pen.)	Stadium: Kolos; Referee: D.Panchyshyn (Kharkiv)
	Penalties
	Lityuk (penalty scored); Makhynia (penalty scored); Melnychenko (penalty scored); Kharzhevskyi (penalty scored); Terekhov (penalty missed); Petrovskyi (penalty scored)		Demchenko (penalty scored); Tsurikov (penalty missed); Myakushko (penalty scored); Bondarenko (penalty scored); Milko (penalty scored); Luchkevych (penalty missed)

23 August 2023	Zviahel (2L)	0–1	(PL) Obolon Kyiv	Zviahel, Zhytomyr Oblast
	Panchyshyn (penalty missed) 90+4'; Yashkov (red card) 90+5'	[ Report]	Chernenko 59'	Stadium: Avanhard; Referee: S.Prychyna (Lviv Oblast)

23 August 2023	Livyi Bereh Kyiv (1L)	1–2 (a.e.t.)	(PL) Chornomorets Odesa	Hnidyn, Kyiv Oblast
	Yakymiv 37'	[ Report]	Kuzyk 12'; Iyede 114'	Stadium: Arena Livyi Bereh; Referee: K.Kozoroh (Kyiv Oblast)

23 August 2023	Hirnyk-Sport Horishni Plavni (1L)	1–3	(PL) Metalist 1925 Kharkiv	Horishni Plavni, Poltava Oblast
	Effiong 76'	[ Report]	Moura 60'; Yusov 75'; Dmytrenko 90+4'	Stadium: Yunist; Referee: D.Yevtukhov (Dnipro)

23 August 2023	LNZ Cherkasy (PL)	0–1	(1L) Viktoriya Sumy	Cherkasy
		[ Report]	Myshenko 13'	Stadium: Cherkasy Arena; Referee: N.Dyord (Uzhhorod)

- Notes:

LNZ vs Viktoriya had been interrupted due to air alert.

=== Round of 16 (1/8) ===
In this round, 8 clubs from the Premier League will enter the competition and join the 8 winners of the Fourth preliminary round (6 clubs from Premier League and 2 clubs from First League).

26 September 2023	Rukh Lviv (PL)	0–1	(PL) Oleksandriya	Vynnyky, Lviv
		[ Report]	Sapuha 90+4' (o.g.)	Stadium: Іmeni Bohdana Markevycha; Referee: D. Panchyshyn (Kharkiv)

26 September 2023	Veres Rivne (PL)	0–3	(PL) Shakhtar Donetsk	Rivne
		[ Report]	Kashchuk 65'; Bondarenko 68'; Ocheretko 90+1'	Stadium: Avanhard Stadium; Referee: I. Paskhal (Kherson)

27 September 2023	Viktoriya Sumy (1L)	1–0	(PL) Mynai	Sumy
14:00	Sasovskyi 47'	[ Report]		Stadium: Yuvileinyi; Referee: K. Kozoroh (Kyiv Oblast)

27 September 2023	Polissia Zhytomyr (PL)	1–1 (a.e.t.) (5–4 p)	(PL) Dnipro-1	Zhytomyr
15:00	Kushnirenko 90+1'	[ Report]	Adamyuk 77'	Stadium: Tsentralnyi; Referee: O. Omelchenko (Sloviansk)
	Penalties
	Kushnirenko (penalty scored); Hrytsuk (penalty scored); Shapoval (penalty scored); Tankovskyi (penalty scored); Kozak (penalty scored)		Hutsulyak (penalty missed); Pikhalyonok (penalty scored); Babenko (penalty scored); Rubchynskyi (penalty scored); Sarapiy (penalty scored)

27 September 2023	Chornomorets Odesa (PL)	2–1	(PL) Kryvbas Kryvyi Rih	Odesa
17:00	Dadá 65'; Šporn 90+4'	[ Report]	Prykhodko 14'	Stadium: Chornomorets Stadium; Referee: S. Prychyna (Lviv Oblast)

27 September 2023	Obolon Kyiv (PL)	1–0	(PL) Dynamo Kyiv	Kyiv
17:00	Sukhanov 57'	[ Report]		Stadium: Obolon Arena; Referee: N. Dyord (Uzhhorod)

27 September 2023	Metalist 1925 Kharkiv (PL)	0–3	(PL) Vorskla Poltava	Hnidyn, Kyiv Oblast
18:30		[ Report]	Kane 15'; Stepanyuk 45+1'; Nesterenko 74'	Stadium: Livyi Bereh; Referee: D. Reznikov (Kamianske)

12 October 2023	Mariupol (1L)	0–1	(PL) Zorya Luhansk	Boryspil, Kyiv Oblast
13:00		[ Report]	Voloshyn 45+1'	Stadium: Kolos Stadium; Referee: D. Kubryak (Odesa)

- Notes:

Rukh vs Oleksandriya kick off time was delayed for 30 minutes due to air alert.

=== Quarter-finals (1/4) ===
This round includes one team from the First League and 7 clubs from the Premier League. Base date for the matches is 1 November 2023. The draw for the round took place at Epet Arena, Prague with active participation of Oleksandr Zinchenko and Ruslan Malinovskyi.

30 October 2023	Viktoriya Sumy (1L)	0–3	(PL) Shakhtar Donetsk	Hnidyn, Kyiv Oblast
15:00		Report	Nazaryna 17'; Zubkov 20'; Rakitskyi 90+1'	Stadium: Livyi Bereh; Referee: O.Derevinskyi (Khmelnytskyi)

1 November 2023	Chornomorets Odesa (PL)	4–1	(PL) Zorya Luhansk	Odesa
15:00	Shtohrin 21', 33', 72'; Vasylyev 58'	[ Report]	Guerrero 80'	Stadium: Chornomorets Stadium; Referee: M.Balakin (Kyiv Oblast)

2 November 2023	Polissia Zhytomyr (PL)	0–0 (a.e.t.) (4–3 p)	(PL) Oleksandriya	Zhytomyr
15:00		[ Report]		Stadium: Tsentralnyi Stadion; Referee: V.Romanov (Dnipro)
	Penalties
	Kushnirenko (penalty scored); Arielson (penalty scored); Mustafayev (penalty scored); Morozko (penalty missed); Kozak (penalty scored)		Skorko (penalty scored); Lohinov (penalty missed); Pohorilyi (penalty scored); Kopyna (penalty missed); Kalitvintsev (penalty scored)

2 November 2023	Obolon Kyiv (PL)	0–3	(PL) Vorskla Poltava	Kyiv
17:00		[ Report]	Stepanyuk 27'; Kane 44'; Batsula 69'	Stadium: Obolon Arena; Referee: D.Shurman (Kyiv Oblast)

- Notes:

Polissia vs Oleksandriya match had been interrupted in the 85th minute for 50 minutes due to air alert.

=== Semi-finals (1/2) ===
3 April 2024	Shakhtar Donetsk (PL)	4–1	(PL) Chornomorets Odesa	Lviv
18:00	Sikan 12'; Bondarenko 44' (pen.); Sudakov 52', 79'	Report	Shtohrin 18'	Stadium: Arena Lviv; Attendance: 674; Referee: Viktor Kopiyevskyi (Kropyvnytskyi)

4 April 2024	Polissia Zhytomyr (PL)	0–1	(PL) Vorskla Poltava	Zhytomyr
18:00		[ Report]	Myakushko 45'	Stadium: Tsentralny; Attendance: 1,427; Referee: Maksym Kozyriatskyi (Zaporizhia)

- Notes:

Polissia vs Vorskla match had been interrupted in the 80th minute for 40 minutes due to air alert.

=== Final ===
15 May 2024	Vorskla Poltava (PL)	1–2	(PL) Shakhtar Donetsk	Rivne
19:00	Kovtalyuk 85'	Report (ua); Report (en)	Sikan 40'; Konoplya 55'	Stadium: Avanhard; Attendance: 3,500; Referee: Vitaliy Romanov (Dnipro)

== Top goalscorers ==
The competition's top three goalscorers including preliminary rounds.

As of 4 April 2024

Rank	Scorer	Team	Goals (Pen.)
1	(Ukraine) Dmytro Kulyk	Kudrivka	4
1	(Ukraine) Andriy Shtohrin	Chornomorets Odesa	4
3	(Ukraine) Oleksandr Batalskyi	Mariupol	3
3	(Ukraine) Yaroslav Kvasov	Inhulets Petrove	3
3	(Ukraine) Artur Vashchyshyn	Zviahel	3 (1)

== See also ==
- 2023–24 Ukrainian Premier League
- 2023–24 Ukrainian First League
- 2023–24 Ukrainian Second League
- 2023–24 Ukrainian Amateur Cup
