= 2023–24 SC Dnipro-1 season =

SC Dnipro-1
2023–24 season
- President: Maksym Bereza and Andriy Rusol (50/50); Yuriy Bereza (honorary president)
- General Director: Andriy Fursov
- Head coach: Oleksandr Kucher (until 20 August); Valeriy Horodov (from 22 August until 13 September, interim); Yuriy Maksymov (from 14 September)
- Stadium: Dnipro-Arena
- Ukrainian Premier League: 4th
- Ukrainian Cup: Round of 16
- UEFA Champions League: Second qualifying round
- UEFA Europa League: Third qualifying round
- UEFA Europa Conference League: Play-off round
- Top goalscorer: League: Oleksandr Filippov; Oleksiy Hutsulyak (9 each); All: Oleksandr Filippov; Oleksiy Hutsulyak (9 each)
- Biggest win: Dnipro-1 5–2 Chornomorets Odesa
- Biggest defeat: Slavia Prague 3–0 Dnipro-1; Kryvbas Kryvyi Rih 3–0 Dnipro-1

The 2023–24 season was SC Dnipro-1's seventh season in existence and fifth consecutive season in the Ukrainian Premier League. They are also competing in the Ukrainian Cup, the UEFA Champions League, the UEFA Europa League and the UEFA Europa Conference League.

FIFA placed a transfer onto the club for the 2023-2024 winter break following legal negotiations between the club and its former manager Igor Jovicevic. In addition to Jovicevic, Oleksandr Kucher admitted that he also was not get compensated by the club as well, but yet does not rush with pursuing his claim in international institutions.

== Players ==
=== First-team squad ===
As of 10 September 2023

Note: Flags indicate national team as defined under FIFA eligibility rules; some limited exceptions apply. Players may hold more than one non-FIFA nationality.

No.	Pos.	Nation	Player
1	GK	UKR	Yevhen Volynets
3	DF	UKR	Volodymyr Adamyuk
4	DF	ARG	Emiliano Purita
5	MF	UKR	Eduard Sarapiy
6	DF	UKR	Oleh Horin
7	FW	UKR	Oleksandr Filippov
8	MF	UKR	Oleksandr Pikhalyonok
9	MF	UKR	Oleksiy Hutsulyak
10	MF	UKR	Maksym Tretyakov
11	DF	UKR	Denys Miroshnichenko
12	GK	UKR	Yakiv Kinareykin
14	FW	UKR	Ramik Hadzhyiev
17	MF	UKR	Bohdan Lyednyev
18	MF	UKR	Ruslan Babenko

No.	Pos.	Nation	Player
19	MF	BRA	Vitinho (on loan from Atlético Mineiro)
20	DF	UKR	Serhiy Horbunov
22	MF	UKR	Valentyn Rubchynskyi
25	MF	UKR	Ihor Kohut
26	DF	UKR	Oleksandr Kapliyenko (on loan from Metalist Kharkiv)
28	FW	BRA	Marcos André
30	DF	UKR	Vasyl Kravets
31	FW	UKR	Daniel Kivinda
33	GK	UKR	Valeriy Yurchuk
34	MF	UKR	Volodymyr Tanchyk
39	DF	UKR	Oleksandr Svatok (captain)
42	MF	UKR	Yevhen Pasich
95	FW	BRA	Felipe Pires
99	FW	BRA	Bill

=== Under contract ===
Note: Flags indicate national team as defined under FIFA eligibility rules; some limited exceptions apply. Players may hold more than one non-FIFA nationality.

No.	Pos.	Nation	Player
—	DF	UKR	Vitaliy Fedoriv

=== Out on loan ===
Note: Flags indicate national team as defined under FIFA eligibility rules; some limited exceptions apply. Players may hold more than one non-FIFA nationality.

No. / Pos. / Nation / Player; — / DF / UKR / Mykyta Kononov (at UCSA Kyiv until 30 June 2024)	No. / Pos. / Nation / Player; — / MF / ARG / Domingo Blanco (at (Mexico) Club Tijuana until 30 June 2024)

== Transfers ==
=== In ===
Pos.	Player	Transferred from	Fee	Date	Source

=== Out ===
Pos.	Player	Transferred from	Fee	Date	Source
FW	(Ukraine) Artem Dovbyk	(Spain) Girona	€7,000,000	6 August 2023	

== Pre-season and friendlies ==
Win Draw Loss Fixtures

2 July 2023 Friendly	Dnipro-1 (Ukraine)	4–1	(Ukraine) FC Khust	Uzhhorod
17:00 UTC+3				Stadium: Avanhard Stadium

5 July 2023 Friendly	Dnipro-1 (Ukraine)	4–0	(Ukraine) FC Mynai	Uzhhorod
17:00 UTC+3				Stadium: Avanhard Stadium

9 July 2023 Friendly	Dnipro-1 (Ukraine)	1–0	(Ukraine) Metalist Kharkiv	Uzhhorod
17:00 UTC+3				Stadium: Avanhard Stadium

13 July 2023 Friendly	Dnipro-1 (Ukraine)	4–0	(Ukraine) Rukh Lviv	Uzhhorod
17:00 UTC+3				Stadium: Avanhard Stadium

18 July 2023 Friendly	Dnipro-1 (Ukraine)	2–2	(Ukraine) Kryvbas Kryvyi Rih	Uzhhorod
17:00 UTC+3				Stadium: Avanhard Stadium

== Competitions ==
=== Overall record ===
Competition	First match	Last match	Starting round	Final position	Record							
Competition	First match	Last match	Starting round	Final position	Pld	W	D	L	GF	GA	GD	Win %
Ukrainian Premier League	6 August 2023	25 May 2024	Matchday 1	4th	30	14	10	6	40	27	+13	46.67
Ukrainian Cup	27 September 2023		Round of 16	Round of 16	1	0	1	0	1	1	+0	0.00
UEFA Champions League	25 July 2023	1 August 2023	Second qualifying round	Second qualifying round	2	0	1	1	3	5	−2	0.00
UEFA Europa League	10 August 2023	17 August 2023	Third qualifying round	Third qualifying round	2	0	1	1	1	4	−3	0.00
UEFA Europa Conference League	24 August 2023	31 August 2023	Play-off round	Play-off round	2	0	1	1	2	3	−1	0.00
Total					37	14	14	9	47	40	+7	37.84

Source: Soccerway

=== Ukrainian Premier League ===
==== League table ====
Pos	Team	Pld	W	D	L	GF	GA	GD	Pts	Qualification or relegation
2	Dynamo Kyiv	30	22	3	5	72	28	+44	69	Qualification for the Champions League second qualifying round
3	Kryvbas Kryvyi Rih	30	17	6	7	51	30	+21	57	Qualification for the Europa League third qualifying round (Note: Since the 2023–24 Ukrainian Cup winners (Shakhtar Donetsk) finished in the top two, the Europa League spot was passed to the third-placed team, and the second Conference League second qualifying round spot was passed to the fifth-placed team.)
4	Dnipro-1 (D)	30	14	10	6	40	27	+13	52	Withdrew after the season (Note: SC Dnipro-1 that withdrew from all tournaments of the 2024–25 season due to financial hardship after finishing 4th in the league qualified for the Conference League second qualifying round, however it was awarded technical losses in both matches (0:3).)
5	Polissya Zhytomyr	30	14	8	8	39	30	+9	50	Qualification for the Conference League second qualifying round
6	Rukh Lviv	30	12	13	5	44	31	+13	49	

Source: upl.ua
Rules for classification: 1) Points; 2) Head-to-head points; 3) Head-to-head goal difference; 4) Head-to-head goals scored; 5) Goal difference; 6) Goals scored; 7) Draw or "Golden match" if two teams tied for title (Article 22, paragraph 3).
(D) Disqualified

==== Results summary ====
Overall								Home						Away					
Pld	W	D	L	GF	GA	GD	Pts	W	D	L	GF	GA	GD	W	D	L	GF	GA	GD
17	10	4	3	26	16	+10	34	5	2	2	14	8	+6	5	2	1	12	8	+4

Last updated: 13 December 2023.

==== Results by round ====
Round	1	2	3	4	5	6	7	8	9	10	11	12	13	14	15	16	17
Ground	A	H	A	H	A	H	H	A	H	H	A	A	H	A	H	H	A
Result	W	W	D	L	W	D	D	W	W	W	W	L	W	W	W	L	D
Position	4	3	4	7	2	5	5	6	3	1	1	3	2	1	1	2	2

Updated to match(es) played on 27 November 2023. Source: VBET League
A = Away; H = Home; W = Win; D = Draw; L = Loss

==== Matches ====
6 August 2023 2	Dnipro-1	2–1	Polissya Zhytomyr	Uzhhorod
15:00 UTC+3	Pasich (yellow card) 36'; Adamyuk (yellow card) 46'; Pikhalyonok 62'; Sarapiy (yellow card) 80'; Babenko 90+1'; Blanco (yellow card) 90+3'	Report	Kushnirenko (red card) 19'; Tankovskyi (yellow card) 34'; Yanakov 87' (pen.); Krushynskyi (yellow card) 90+3'	Stadium: Avanhard Stadium; Referee: Denys Shurman

13 August 2023 3	Mynai	1–1	Dnipro-1	Mynai
13:00 UTC+3	Panasenko (yellow card) 43'; Petko (yellow card) 65'; Tverdokhlib 89'	Report	Adamyuk (yellow card) 29'; Sarapiy (red card) 50'; Babenko (yellow card) 59', (penalty missed) 82'; Blanco 90+3' (pen.)	Stadium: Stadion Mynai; Referee: Viktor Kopiyevskyi

20 August 2023 4	Dnipro-1	1–2	Obolon Kyiv	Uzhhorod
15:00 UTC+3	Pikhalyonok 16' (pen.), (yellow card) 48'; Svatok (yellow card) 67'	Report	Taranukha 46'; Vovkun (yellow card) 73'; Krasnopir 83'	Stadium: Avanhard Stadium; Referee: Mykola Balakin

3 September 2023 6	Dnipro-1	0–0	LNZ Cherkasy	Uzhhorod
13:00 UTC+3	Kapliyenko (yellow card) 88'; Horin (yellow card) 90+3'	Report	Kalyuzhnyi (yellow card) 54'; Savin (yellow card) 58'; Norenkov (yellow card) 68'; Boyko (yellow card) 90+1'	Stadium: Avanhard Stadium; Referee: Dmytro Panchyshyn

17 September 2023 7	Dnipro-1	1–1	Kolos Kovalivka	Dnipro
15:00	Kohut (yellow card) 26'; Kravets (yellow card) 58'; Hutsulyak 68'		Chornomorets (yellow card) 42'; Salabay 61'	Stadium: Dnipro-Arena; Referee: Igor Paskhal

24 September 2023 8	Zorya Luhansk	0–1	Dnipro-1	Lviv
15:00	Vantukh (yellow card) 39'		Kohut 24'; Kravets (yellow card) 59'; Babenko (yellow card) 61'; Sarapiy (yellow card) 73'	Stadium: Ukraina Stadium; Referee: Kateryna Monzul

2 October 2023 9	Dnipro-1	1–0	Metalist 1925 Kharkiv	Dnipro
17:00	Kohut (yellow card) 25'; Lednev 56'; Volynets (yellow card) 82'		Boryachuk (yellow card) 63'; Bezuhlyi (yellow card) 64'; Kurylo (yellow card) 90+6'	Stadium: Dnipro-Arena; Attendance: Roman Blavatskyi

7 October 2023 10	Dnipro-1	2–0	Veres Rivne	Dnipro
13:15	Filippov 10'; Vovchenko 31' (o.g.); Sarapiy (yellow card) 86'		Shevchenko (yellow card) 77'	Stadium: Dnipro-Arena; Referee: Anastasiya Romanyuk

22 October 2023 11	Dynamo Kyiv	0–1	Dnipro-1	Kyiv
17:00	Benito (yellow card) 67'; Dubinchak (yellow card) 70'		Hutsulyak 13'; Rubchynskyi (yellow card) 21'; Sarapiy (yellow card) 31'; Hutsulyak (yellow card) 40'; Kapliyenko (yellow card) 90+4'	Stadium: Valeriy Lobanovskyi Dynamo Stadium; Referee: Viktor Kopiyevskyi

25 October 2023 1	Vorskla Poltava	2–3	Dnipro-1	Poltava
15:00	Santana (yellow card) 10'; Perduta (yellow card) 24'; Stepanyuk 40', 90' (pen.); Sklyar (yellow card) 66'		Filippov 5'; Gorbunov (yellow card) 32'; Hutsulyak 42', 53'; Horin (yellow card) 89'	Stadium: Oleksiy Butovsky Vorskla Stadium; Referee: Kateryna Monzul

28 October 2023 12	Kryvbas Kryvyi Rih	3–0	Dnipro-1	Kryvyi Rih
14:15	Kozhushko 11', 51'; Kuzyk 41'		Pikhalyonok (yellow card) 43'; Lednev (yellow card) 77'; Klishchuk (penalty missed) 87'; Kravets (yellow card) 90'	Stadium: Stadion Shakhty Zhovtneva; Referee: Dmytro Panchyshyn

1 November 2023 5	Rukh Lviv	0–2	Dnipro-1	Lviv
18:00	Teslyuk (yellow card) 33'; Slyubyk (yellow card) 63'		Filippov 16'; Pikhalyonok (yellow card) 21', (goal) 26'; Hutsulyak (yellow card) 75'; Miroshnichenko (yellow card) 84'	Stadium: Arena Lviv; Referee: Dmytro Kryvushkin

6 November 2023 13	Dnipro-1	1–0	FC Oleksandriya	Dnipro
17:15	Filippov 34'; Sarapiy (yellow card) 72'		Skorko (yellow card) 80'	Stadium: Dnipro-Arena; Referee: Anastasiya Romanyuk

12 November 2023 14	Shakhtar Donetsk	1–3	Dnipro-1	Lviv
19:00	Sikan 5'; Bondar (yellow card) 76'		Sarapiy 41'; Hutsulyak 51'; Lyednyev 55'; Rubchynskyi (yellow card) 61'	Stadium: Arena Lviv; Referee: Mykola Balakin

27 November 2023 15	Dnipro-1	5–2	Chornomorets Odesa	Dnipro
17:00	Filippov 16'; Sarapiy (yellow card) 20'; Adamyuk 49'; Lyednyev 59'; Rubchynskyi 90'; Miroshnichenko 90+2'		Volynets 22' (o.g.); Avahimyan (red card) 26'; Putrya (yellow card) 63'; Badibanga (yellow card) 73'; Kuzyk 76'; Shtohrin (yellow card) 77'	Stadium: Dnipro-Arena; Referee: Kateryna Monzul

2 December 2023 16	Dnipro-1	1–2	Vorskla Poltava	Dnipro
17:00	Lyednyev 3'; Hutsulyak (yellow card) 38'		Chelyadin 31'; Felipe Rodrigues 42'; Yakubu (yellow card) 88'	Stadium: Dnipro-Arena; Referee: Anastasiya Romanyuk

8 December 2023 17	Polissya Zhytomyr	1–1	Dnipro-1	Korosten
19:00	Taylor 62', (yellow card) 90+1'; Budkivskyi (yellow card) 63'; Shastal (yellow card) 85'		Rubchynskyi (yellow card) 20'; Filippov 49'	Stadium: Stadion Spartak; Referee: Mykola Balakin

=== Ukrainian Cup ===
27 September 2023 Round of 16	Polissya Zhytomyr	1–1 (a.e.t.) (5–4 p)	Dnipro-1	Zhytomyr
15:00	Kushnirenko 90+1'		Adamyuk 77'	Stadium: Tsentralnyi Stadion; Referee: Oleksandr Omelchenko
	Penalties
	Kushnirenko (penalty scored); Hrytsuk (penalty scored); Shapoval (penalty scored); Tankovskyi (penalty scored); Kozak (penalty scored)		Hutsulyak (penalty missed); Pikhalyonok (penalty scored); Babenko (penalty scored); Rubchynskyi (penalty scored); Sarapiy (penalty scored)

=== UEFA Champions League ===
==== Second qualifying round ====
The draw for the second qualifying round was held on 21 June 2023.

25 July 2023 First leg	Dnipro-1 (Ukraine)	1–3	(Greece) Panathinaikos	Košice, Slovakia
20:00 UTC+2	Hutsulyak (yellow card) 69'; Tanchyk 90'	Report	Šporar 10'; Đuričić 74'; Ioannidis 84' (pen.)	Stadium: Košická futbalová aréna Attendance: 5,248; Referee: Daniele Chiffi (Italy)

1 August 2023 Second leg	Panathinaikos (Greece)	2–2 (5–3 agg.)	(Ukraine) Dnipro-1	Athens, Greece
20:30 UTC+3	Šporar 15', 70'; Palacios (yellow card) 45+2'; Çokaj (yellow card) 90+5'	Report	Blanco (yellow card) 20'; Dovbyk 24'; Rubchynskyi (yellow card) 43'; Sarapiy 54'; Pikhalyonok (yellow card) 55'; Tanchyk (red card) 75'; Kohut (yellow card) 87'	Stadium: Leoforos Alexandras Stadium; Attendance: 14,098; Referee: Bastian Dankert (Germany)

=== UEFA Europa League ===
==== Third qualifying round ====
The draw for the third qualifying round was held on 24 July 2023.

10 August 2023 First leg	Slavia Prague (Czech Republic)	3–0	(Ukraine) Dnipro-1	Prague, Czech Republic
19:00 UTC+2	Schranz 5', 38'; Ogbu (red card) 59'; Wallem 81'; Masopust (yellow card) 90+7'	Report	Svatok (yellow card) 41'; Babenko (yellow card) 53'; Lyednyev (yellow card) 71'; Rubchynskyi (yellow card) 74'; Kravets (yellow card) 87'	Stadium: Fortuna Arena; Attendance: 19,102; Referee: Lawrence Visser (Belgium)

17 August 2023 Second leg	Dnipro-1 (Ukraine)	1–1 (1–4 agg.)	(Czech Republic) Slavia Prague	Košice, Slovakia
20:00 UTC+2	Hutsulyak (yellow card) 25'; Rubchynskyi 45+1'; Babenko (yellow card) 70'	Report	Jurečka 52'	Stadium: Košická futbalová aréna Attendance: 5,855; Referee: Jesús Gil Manzano (Spain)
Note: Due to the Russian invasion of Ukraine, Ukrainian teams are required to play their home matches at neutral venues until further notice.

=== UEFA Europa Conference League ===
==== Play-off round ====
The draw for the play-off round was held on 7 August 2023.

23 August 2023 First leg	Spartak Trnava (Slovakia)	1–1	(Ukraine) Dnipro-1	Trnava, Slovakia
18:30 UTC+2	Daniel (yellow card) 13'; Bukata (yellow card) 45+6'; Ofori (yellow card) 53', (goal) 55'; Oseni (yellow card) 58'	Report	Sarapiy (red card) 9'; Svatok (yellow card) 45+6'; Rubchynskyi (yellow card) 45+8'; Pikhalyonok 67' (pen.); Kohut (yellow card) 74' (yellow-red card) 88'; Kinareykin (yellow card) 90+8'	Stadium: Anton Malatinský Stadium; Attendance: 16,566; Referee: Juxhin Xhaja (Albania)

31 August 2023 Second leg	Dnipro-1 (Ukraine)	1–2 (a.e.t.) (2–3 agg.)	(Slovakia) Spartak Trnava	Košice, Slovakia
20:00 UTC+2	Ezequiel Gorosito 60' (o.g.); Felipe Blanco (yellow card) 82'; Babenko (red card) 99'; Horin (yellow card) 103' (yellow-red card) 108'	Report	Daniel 3'; Šulek (yellow card) 63'; Bukata 106'	Stadium: Košická futbalová aréna Attendance: 5,266; Referee: Balázs Berke (Hungary)
Note: Due to the Russian invasion of Ukraine, Ukrainian teams are required to play their home matches at neutral venues until further notice.
