= Kryvbas Company (Ukraine) =

- Ukrainian: Рота поліції «Кривбас»
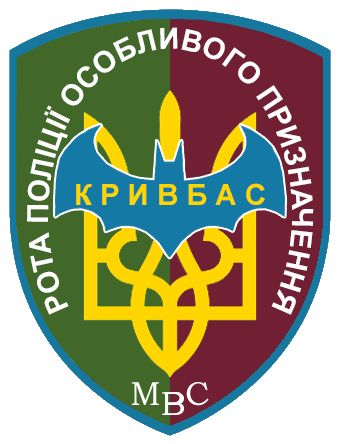
- Kryvbas Company Insignia
- Active: 2014–present
- Country: Ukraine
- Branch: Ministry of Internal Affairs
- Type: Special Tasks Patrol Police
- Part of: Dnipro-1 Regiment
- Garrison/HQ: Kryvyi Rih
- Engagements: Russo-Ukrainian War: War in Donbas; Russian invasion of Ukraine

Commanders
- Current commander: Major Ihor Sapiga
- Notable commanders: Major Yuriy Mykolayovych Bereza

The Kryvbas Company is a company of the Dnipro-1 Regiment of the Liut Brigade of the Special Tasks Patrol Police subordinated to Ministry of Internal Affairs of Ukraine. The regiment is currently based in Kryvyi Rih. It was established in 2014 and has, since then seen regular combat on the frontlines in addition to special counter-crime operations in Kryvyi Rih.

== History ==
In April 2014, the head of the Ministry of Internal Affairs of Ukraine, Arsen Avakov, announced the establishment of a volunteer corps of special units of the Special Tasks Patrol Police. In June 2014, the head of the Kryvyi Rih, Andriy Grechuh, took the initiative to create the Kryvbas Special Purpose Company. On 2 June 2014, the Kryvbas Company was established as a separate Company of the Dnipro-1 Regiment. Public organizations as "Avtomaidan" and "Women's Hundred", the Armenian and Azerbaijani diaspora, provided material support to the battalion. For three months, it was trained and deployed for law enforcement operations in Kryvyi Rih.

All fighters are instructed, have passed special training. All patriots of their country, whose main task is to establish contact with local residents, to ensure the protection of public order and the safety of local residents

On 19 September 2014, it was deployed to the ATO zone. In 2014–2015, the Kryvbas Company spent eight and a half months on combat duty at ground zero on the Lebedynske-Shirokyno line in Donetsk Oblast. In 2015, the battalion became the Kryvbas Special Purpose Patrol Service Company in Dnipropetrovsk Oblast, it also conducted patrol and special operations in Kryvyi Rih. On 15 October 2021, a weapon stash of 89 grenade launchers of various models, 178 rocket-propelled grenades, 336 hand grenades, 329 fuzes, 56,000 rounds of ammunition, fuzes for anti-tank mines, and smoke grenades was discovered from the battalion's territory in Tonenke, the equipment was unlicensed and allegedly intended for sale, a probe was launched into the matter.

External images
- Спецпризначенці «Кривбасу»
- Бійці «Кривбасу» перед відряджанням в зону АТО

Following the Russian invasion of Ukraine, it performed combat operations. In January 2024, as a part of the Dnipro-1 Regiment, it became a part of the Liut Brigade. In May 2024, the company along with Dnipro-1 Regiment became artillery support units.

== Commanders ==
- Major Yuriy Mykolayovych Bereza (2014-?)
- Major Ihor Sapiga (?-)

== Sources ==
- У зону АТО відправився міліцейський батальйон «Кривбас» (ФОТО)
- Екіпіровка бійців батальйону «Кривбас» on YouTube
- Як живуть бійці батальйону «Кривбас» на блокпостах on YouTube
- Батальйонна пісня on YouTube
