= Oleksandr Filippov =

Ukrainian footballer

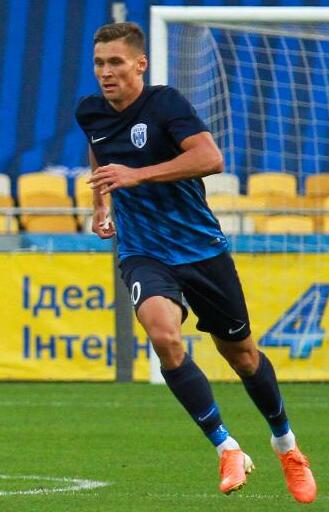

Personal information
- Full name: Oleksandr Oleksandrovych Filippov
- Date of birth: 23 October 1992 (age 34)
- Place of birth: Avdiivka, Ukraine
- Height: 1.83 m (6 ft 0 in)
- Position: Striker

Team information
- Current team: Polissya Zhytomyr
- Number: 9

Youth career
- 2006–2009: UOR Donetsk

Senior career*
| Years | Team | Apps | (Gls) |
| 2011–2014 | Arsenal Kyiv | 6 | (0) |
| 2014–2015 | Illichivets Mariupol | 0 | (0) |
| 2015 | NPHU-Makiyivvuhillya Nikopol | 11 | (3) |
| 2015–2016 | Avanhard Kramatorsk | 23 | (6) |
| 2016–2020 | Desna Chernihiv | 138 | (48) |
| 2020–2023 | Sint-Truiden | 15 | (1) |
| 2022 | → Riga (loan) | 17 | (2) |
| 2023–2024 | Dnipro-1 | 23 | (9) |
| 2024–2025 | Oleksandriya | 27 | (10) |
| 2025– | Polissya Zhytomyr | 30 | (4) |

International career^{‡}
| 2012 | Ukraine U20 | 3 | (0) |
| 2012–2013 | Ukraine U21 | 5 | (1) |
- * Club domestic league appearances and goals as of 19 October 2026 ‡ National team caps and goals as of 25 August 2024

Oleksandr Oleksandrovych Filippov (Ukrainian: Олександр Олександрович Філіппов; born 23 October 1992) is a Ukrainian professional footballer who plays as a striker for Polissya Zhytomyr.

== Club career ==
=== Desna Chernihiv ===
In 2016, Filippov moved to Desna Chernihiv With the club he was promoted to the Ukrainian Premier League in the 2017–18 season. In the 2018–19 Ukrainian Premier League season, he played 28 matches and scored 5 goals. On 30 October 2019 he scored 2 goals in Ukrainian Cup against MFC Mykolaiv away at the Tsentralnyi Miskyi Stadion.

He was the second top scorer in the 2019–20 Ukrainian Premier League with 16 goals and helped his club qualify for the 2020–21 Europa League third qualifying round for the first time in club history. Filippov was also included in the Ukrainian Premier League Best IX for the season.

=== Sint-Truiden ===
On 22 September 2020 he signed a three-year contract with Sint-Truiden for €1.5 million, becoming the most expensive player sold by Desna Chernihiv. He made his debut for the club in the Belgian First Division A against Mechelen at the AFAS-stadion Achter de Kazerne, replacing Facundo Colidio in the 66th minute. On 17 October he scored his first league goal against Beerschot at the Olympisch Stadion. On 3 February 2021, he made his debut in the 2020–21 Belgian Cup against Lokeren-Temse at the Daknamstadion.

=== Loan to Riga ===
In February 2022 he moved on loan to Riga in the Latvian Higher League. On 12 March he scored his first league goal by converting a penalty kick against Valmiera. On 7 July he scored against Derry City at the Ryan McBride Brandywell Stadium in the 2022–23 UEFA Europa Conference League first qualifying round.

=== Dnipro-1 ===
In August 2023, he signed for Dnipro-1 in Ukrainian Premier League.

=== Oleksandriya ===
In July 2024 he moved to Oleksandriya. Here he scored 10 goals, helping the club to get 2nd position in Ukrainian Premier League. On 20 June 2025 he left the club with mutual agreement.

=== Polissya Zhytomyr ===
On 21 June 2025, he signed for Polissya Zhytomyr in Ukrainian Premier League.

== Outside of professional football ==
In March 2022, during the Siege of Chernihiv, Filippov, together with other former Desna Chernihiv players, helped raise money for the civilian population of the city of Chernihiv. In April, he donated his Sint-Truiden kit to a fundraiser, all proceeds from which will go to the aid of the Ukrainian Armed Forces.

== International career ==
In January 2013, he reached the final of the 2013 Commonwealth of Independent States Cup with the Ukraine under-21 team, playing in four matches and scoring one goal.

== Career statistics ==
=== Club ===
As of match played 19 October 2026

Appearances and goals by club, season and competition
| Club | Season | League | | | Cup | | Europe | | Other | | Total | |
| Club | Season | Division | Apps | Goals | Apps | Goals | Apps | Goals | Apps | Goals | Apps | Goals |
|---|---|---|---|---|---|---|---|---|---|---|---|---|
| Arsenal Kyiv | 2011–12 | Ukrainian Premier League | 0 | 0 | 0 | 0 | 0 | 0 | 0 | 0 | 0 | 0 |
| Arsenal Kyiv | 2012–13 | Ukrainian Premier League | 3 | 0 | 1 | 0 | 0 | 0 | 0 | 0 | 4 | 0 |
| Arsenal Kyiv | 2013–14 | Ukrainian Premier League | 3 | 0 | 1 | 0 | 0 | 0 | 0 | 0 | 4 | 0 |
| Illichivets Mariupol | 2014–15 | Ukrainian Premier League | 0 | 0 | 1 | 0 | 0 | 0 | 0 | 0 | 1 | 0 |
| NPHU-Makiyivvuhillya Nikopol | 2014–15 | Ukrainian Second League | 11 | 3 | 1 | 0 | 0 | 0 | 0 | 0 | 12 | 3 |
| Avanhard Kramatorsk | 2015–16 | Ukrainian First League | 23 | 6 | 2 | 2 | 0 | 0 | 0 | 0 | 25 | 8 |
| Desna Chernihiv | 2016–17 | Ukrainian First League | 23 | 11 | 4 | 1 | 0 | 0 | 0 | 0 | 27 | 12 |
| Desna Chernihiv | 2017–18 | Ukrainian First League | 30 | 11 | 4 | 1 | 0 | 0 | 2 | 0 | 36 | 12 |
| Desna Chernihiv | 2018–19 | Ukrainian Premier League | 28 | 5 | 2 | 0 | 0 | 0 | 0 | 0 | 30 | 5 |
| Desna Chernihiv | 2019–20 | Ukrainian Premier League | 30 | 16 | 2 | 2 | 0 | 0 | 0 | 0 | 32 | 18 |
| Desna Chernihiv | 2020–21 | Ukrainian Premier League | 2 | 1 | 0 | 0 | 0 | 0 | 0 | 0 | 2 | 1 |
| Sint-Truiden | 2020–21 | Belgian First Division A | 15 | 1 | 1 | 0 | 0 | 0 | 0 | 0 | 16 | 1 |
| Riga (loan) | 2022 | Latvian Higher League | 17 | 2 | 1 | 0 | 2 (Note: two appearance in 2022–23 UEFA Europa Conference League First qualifying round) | 1 (Note: one goal in 2022–23 UEFA Europa Conference League First qualifying round) | 0 | 0 | 20 | 3 |
| Sint-Truiden | 2022–23 | Belgian First Division A | 0 | 0 | 0 | 0 | 0 | 0 | 0 | 0 | 0 | 0 |
| Dnipro-1 | 2023–24 | Ukrainian Premier League | 23 | 9 | 0 | 0 | 4 | 0 | 0 | 0 | 27 | 9 |
| Oleksandriya | 2024–25 | Ukrainian Premier League | 27 | 10 | 1 | 0 | 0 | 0 | 0 | 0 | 28 | 10 |
| Polissya Zhytomyr | 2025–26 | Ukrainian Premier League | 29 | 4 | 1 | 0 | 6 (Note: two appearance in 2025–26 UEFA Europa Conference League First qualifying round) | 1 | 0 | 0 | 36 | 5 |
| Polissya Zhytomyr | 2026–27 | Ukrainian Premier League | 1 | 0 | 0 | 0 | 2 (Note: two appearance in 2026–27 UEFA Europa Conference League First qualifying round) | 1 | 0 | 0 | 3 | 1 |
| Career total | | | 243 | 77 | 22 | 6 | 14 | 3 | 2 | 0 | 281 | 86 |

== Honours ==
Desna Chernihiv

- Ukrainian First League: 2017–18

Ukraine national under-21

- Commonwealth of Independent States Cup: Runner-up 2013

Oleksandriya

- Ukrainian Premier League: Runner-up 2024–25

Individual

- Desna Chernihiv Player of the Year: (2) 2017, 2020
- Ukrainian Premier League Player of the Round: 2025–26 (Round 7),
