= Valentyn Rubchynskyi =

Ukrainian footballer

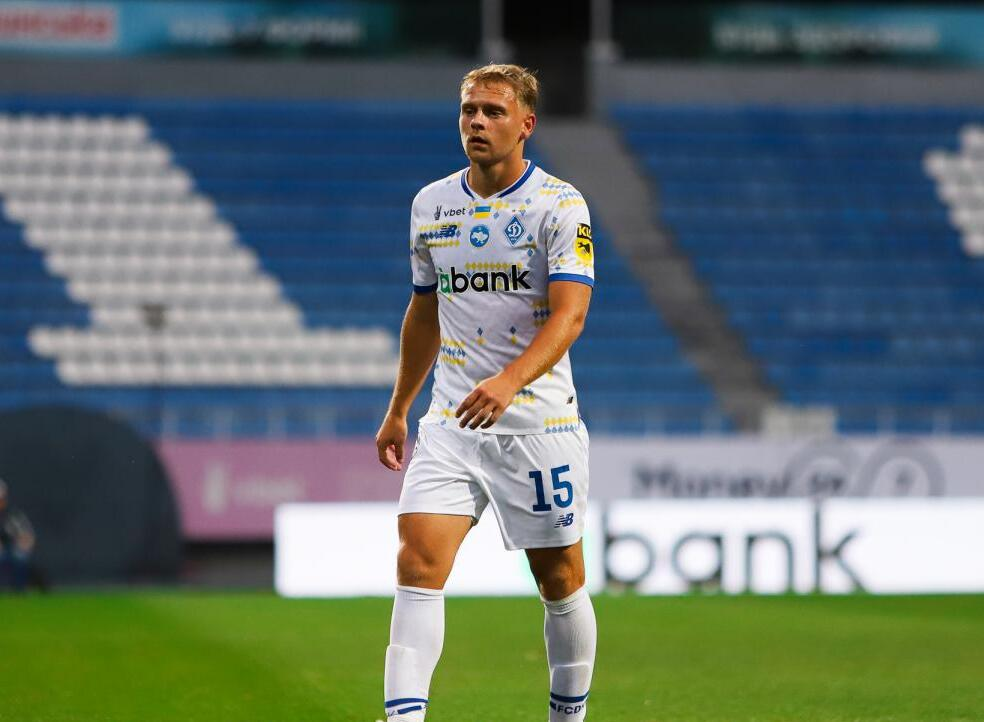

Personal information
- Full name: Valentyn Mykolayovych Rubchynskyi
- Date of birth: 15 February 2002 (age 24)
- Place of birth: Lutsk, Ukraine
- Height: 1.65 m (5 ft 5 in)
- Position: Central midfielder

Team information
- Current team: Dynamo Kyiv
- Number: 15

Youth career
- 2014–2019: Dnipro

Senior career*
Years	Team	Apps	(Gls)
2018	Dnipro	4	(0)
2019–2024	Dnipro-1	57	(1)
2021–2022	→ Nikopol (loan)	20	(3)
2024–	Dynamo Kyiv	28	(3)
2026	→ Karpaty Lviv (loan)	9	(0)

International career^{‡}
2017	Ukraine U15	2	(0)
2017–2018	Ukraine U16	7	(1)
2019	Ukraine U17	2	(0)
2023–2025	Ukraine U21	19	(1)
2024	Ukraine U23	8	(1)
- * Club domestic league appearances and goals as of 19 September 2026 ‡ National team caps and goals as of 19 June 2025

Valentyn Mykolayovych Rubchynskyi (Ukrainian: Валентин Миколайович Рубчинський; born 15 February 2002) is a Ukrainian professional footballer who plays as a central midfielder for Ukrainian Premier League club Dynamo Kyiv.

== Career ==
=== Early years ===
Born in Lutsk, Rubchynskyi is a product of Dnipro academy.

=== Dnipro ===
In January 2018, he was promoted to the senior squad of Dnipro, and played in the Ukrainian Second League.

=== Dnipro-1 ===
In February 2019, he joined another club from Dnipro – Dnipro-1 and made his debut for the club in the winning match against Sumy on 12 April 2019 in the Ukrainian First League as a second-half substitute player.

== International career ==
In May 2024, Rubchynskyi was called up by Ruslan Rotan to the Ukraine Olympic football team squad to play at the 2024 Maurice Revello Tournament in France.

== Career statistics ==
As of match played 19 September 2026

Appearances and goals by club, season and competition
Club	Season	League			Cup		Europe		Other		Total	
Club	Season	Division	Apps	Goals	Apps	Goals	Apps	Goals	Apps	Goals	Apps	Goals
Dnipro	2017–18	Ukrainian Second League	4	0	—		—		—		4	0
Dnipro-1	2018–19	Ukrainian First League	1	0	—		—		—		1	0
Dnipro-1	2022–23	Ukrainian Premier League	28	1	—		9 (Note: One appearance in UEFA Europa League, eight appearances and one goal in UEFA Conference League)	1	—		37	2
Dnipro-1	2023–24	Ukrainian Premier League	28	0	1	0	6 (Note: Two appearances in UEFA Champions League, two appearances and one goal in UEFA Europa League, two appearances in UEFA Conference League)	1	—		36	1
Dnipro-1	Total		57	1	1	0	15	2	—		73	3
Nikopol (loan)	2021–22	Ukrainian Second League	20	3	2	0	—		—		22	3
Dynamo Kyiv	2024–25	Ukrainian Premier League	21	3	3	0	7 (Note: Appearances in UEFA Europa League)	0	—		31	3
Dynamo Kyiv	2025–26	Ukrainian Premier League	2	0	0	0	3 (Note: Appearances in UEFA Conference League)	0	—		5	0
Dynamo Kyiv	2026–27	Ukrainian Premier League	5	0	0	0	3 (Note: One appearance in UEFA Europa League, two appearances in UEFA Conference League)	0	—		8	0
Dynamo Kyiv	Total		28	3	3	0	13	0	—		44	3
Karpaty Lviv (loan)	2025–26	Ukrainian Premier League	9	0	—		—		—		9	0
Career total			118	7	6	0	28	2	0	0	152	9
