= Oleh Horin =

Ukrainian footballer

Personal information
- Full name: Oleh Andriyovych Horin
- Date of birth: 2 February 2000 (age 26)
- Place of birth: Lviv, Ukraine
- Height: 1.84 m (6 ft 0 in)
- Position: Centre-back

Team information
- Current team: LNZ Cherkasy
- Number: 25

Youth career
- –2015: Karpaty Lviv
- 2015–2017: Lviv

Senior career*
Years	Team	Apps	(Gls)
2016–2017	Lviv	8	(0)
2017–2018	Veres Rivne	0	(0)
2018–2019	Lviv	0	(0)
2019–2020	Jagiellonia Białystok	1	(0)
2021–2023	Mynai	34	(2)
2023–2024	Dnipro-1	4	(0)
2025	Rukh Lviv	9	(1)
2025–	LNZ Cherkasy	25	(1)

International career
2018	Ukraine U18	2	(0)
2018–2019	Ukraine U19	5	(0)
- * Club domestic league appearances and goals as of 3 June 2026

Oleh Andriyovych Horin (Ukrainian: Олег Андрійович Горін; born 2 February 2000) is a Ukrainian professional footballer who plays as a centre-back for LNZ Cherkasy.

== Club career ==
Horin is a product of the Karpaty and Lviv academies.

He spent his career as a player for FC Veres Rivne and FC Lviv in the Ukrainian Premier League Reserves and in July 2019, he signed a four-year contract with Polish Ekstraklasa side Jagiellonia Białystok.

On 8 November 2019, he made a debut for Jagiellonia in a losing match against Piast Gliwice as a second-half substituted player.
