= Donetsk-1 Company (Ukraine) =

- Ukrainian: Рота поліції «Донецьк-1»
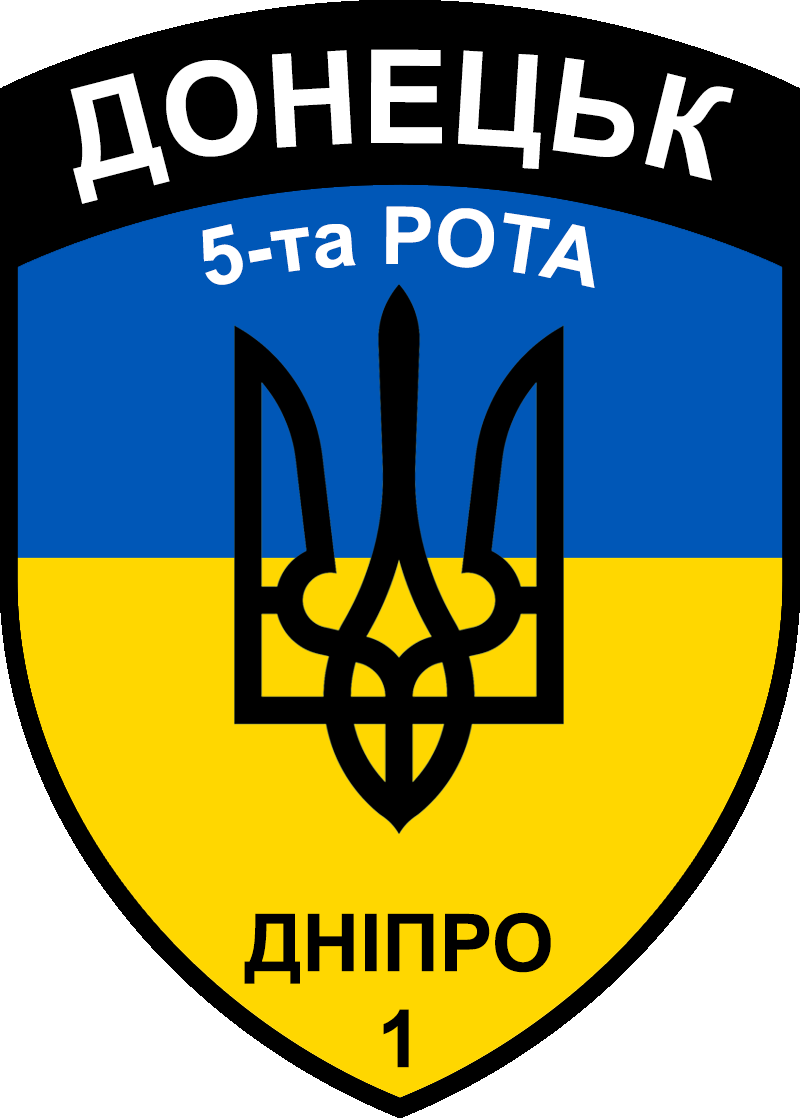
- Donetsk Company Insignia
- Active: 2014–present
- Country: Ukraine
- Branch: Ministry of Internal Affairs
- Type: Special Tasks Patrol Police
- Part of: Dnipro-1 Regiment
- Garrison/HQ: Dnipropetrovsk
- Engagements: Russo-Ukrainian War: War in Donbas; Russian invasion of Ukraine

Commanders
- Current commander: Lieutenant Colonel Volodymyr Ivanovych Shilov

The Donetsk Company is the 5th company of the Dnipro-1 Regiment of the Liut Brigade of the Special Tasks Patrol Police subordinated to Ministry of Internal Affairs of Ukraine. The regiment is currently based in Dnipropetrovsk although its official garrison is Donetsk. It was established in 2014 and has, since then seen regular combat on the frontlines.

== History ==
In April 2014, its establishment started in the form of Donetsk Battalion In the end, instead of a battalion, the 5th Donetsk Company was established as a part of the Dnipro-1 Regiment with Lieutenant Colonel Volodymyr Shilov being appointed its commander. Since April 2014, the company engaged separatists in Donetsk Oblast. From 23 to 26 May 2014, the company carried out security and guardian operations during the 2014 Ukrainian presidential election in Pokrovsk Raion. On 10 July 2014, the Company conducted combat reconnaissance near the village of Karlivka and evacuated the dead and wounded soldiers of the 93rd Mechanized Brigade under intense fire from the separatists and returned to the company base without casualties. On 21 July 2014, together with the Dnipro-2 Battalion, the Donbas Battalion and the 93rd Mechanized Brigade, the company captured the villages of Tonenke, Vodiane and Pisky. During the Battle of Pisky, the company captured a separatist Daewoo Lanos carrying four members of the "Russian Orthodox Army" who were also captured. 12 RGD-5 grenades, 8 AK-47s and 25 kg of explosives were captured. On 25 July 2014, along with the Dnipro-2 Battalion, the Shakhtarsk Battalion and the 93rd Mechanized Brigade, Pisky was captured. Following the panic retreat of the two battalions and their armored vehicles, the company took up the defense of the village, the company did not suffer casualties but separatist Berkut unit was destroyed, 4 separatists traveling in a "Gazelle" car. A Utes machine gun, a PKM machine gun, 2 AK-74s, 10 F-1 grenades were also captured. During reconnaissance operations, two separate policemen were captured, 2 AK-74s, a Mitsubishi Lancer police car of Donetsk People's Republic and 25 PM service. At the time of returning to combat positions in the Pisky, the company ran into a convoy of DPR separatists. During the battle, 12 separatists were killed, a Bogdan bus and a ZIL-131 were destroyed. Moreover, 1 SVD , 8 AK-74s, 4 PM pistols, 10 RGD-5s, 4 F-1 grenades were also captured. On 14 August 2014, during a reconnaissance operation, the company was ambushed wounding the company commander along with five other personnel who were then taken to Dnipropetrovsk. On 14 September 2014, three personnel of the company were killed and several more wounded in a battle near Karlovka. The company also operated in Novoazovsk and manned checkpoints there before its capture by Russian forces using tanks after which the personnel were relocated to Mariupol. In November 2014, the company was operating near the city of Donetsk.

== Commanders ==
- Lieutenant Colonel Volodymyr Ivanovych Shilov

== Sources ==
- Звільнити Донецьк можна уже сьогодні — командир з батальйону «Дніпро-1» Шилов
- "Дайте мені людей і ми візьмемо Донецьк", — підполковник Шилов on YouTube
