= Dnipro-1 Regiment =

- Ukrainian: Полк патрульної служби поліції особливого призначення «Дніпро-1»
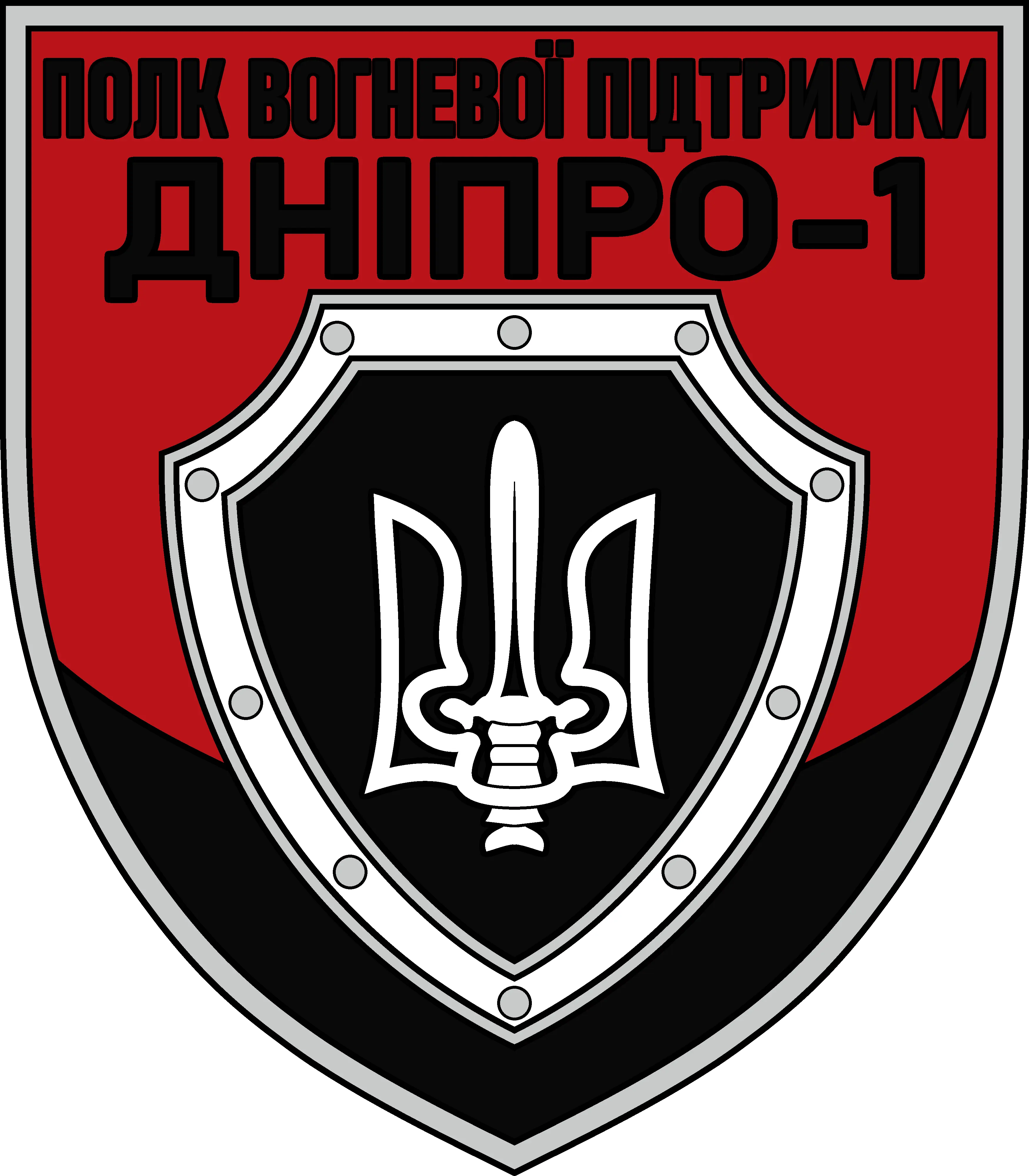
- Dnipro-1 Regiment shoulder sleeve insignia
- Active: 2014–present
- Country: Ukraine
- Branch: Ministry of Internal Affairs; National Police of Ukraine
- Type: Special Tasks Patrol Police
- Role: Counterinsurgency
- Size: 600
- Part of: Liut Brigade (2023–present)
- Garrison/HQ: Dnipro
- Engagements: Russo-Ukrainian War: 2014 pro-Russian unrest in Ukraine; War in Donbas; Battle of Ilovaisk; Battle of Mariupol; Russian invasion of Ukraine; Battle of Lyman (September–October 2022)

Insignia
- Former Insignia (2015–2023)

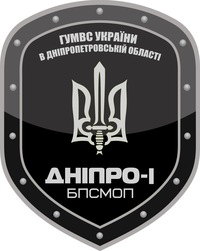
- Former Insignia (2014)

The "Dnipro-1" Regiment (Ukrainian: Полк «Дніпро-1») is a Special Tasks Patrol Police regiment subordinated to Ministry of Internal Affairs of Ukraine. The regiment is based in Dnipro.

The Dnipro-1 was one of the first official Ukrainian volunteer battalions to be created—militias and paramilitary groups mobilized to support and fill the gaps in the Ukrainian Armed Forces against the pro-Russian separatists during the conflict in Eastern Ukraine. Dnipro-1 was formed in April 2014 under the Ministry of Internal Affairs with its personnel drawn largely from volunteers, including former police officers, military reservists, and political activists who participated on the Euromaidan. As such, they were accused of having nationalist views. In 2023, they were designated as a terrorist organization by Russia. In December 2023, during the Russian invasion of Ukraine, Dnipro-1 was reassigned to the Liut Brigade.

The unit also had a football club of the Ukrainian Premier League named SC Dnipro-1, named after the unit.

== History ==
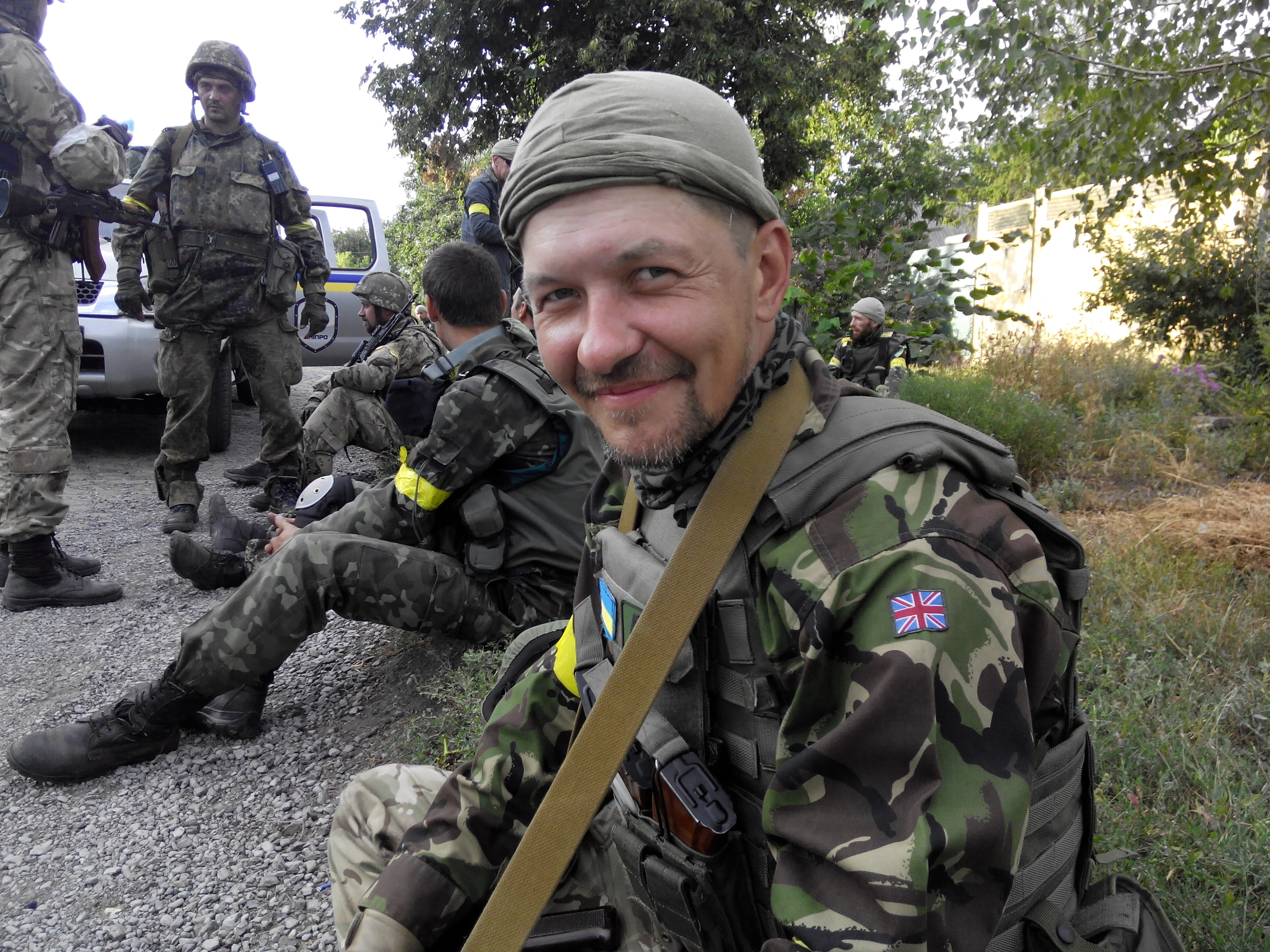
Dnipro-1 volunteers at the War in Donbas, 2014

The unit was first established as "Dnipro-1" Special Tasks Patrol Police Battalion in April 2014 on a voluntary basis as the response to 2014 pro-Russian unrest in Ukraine. Its assignments included duties at multiple checkpoints in the south-eastern part of Ukraine. The unit claimed to have hired Romanian and Georgian military advisers to help with the training of troops. Before June 2014 this training was often just one week. It first operated outside Dnipropetrovsk Oblast in May 2014.

The militia unit, nicknamed Kolomoyskyi's battalion, was funded by the Ministry of Internal Affairs of Ukraine and also through the charitable organization "Fund Dnipro-1". Ukrainian oligarch Ihor Kolomoyskyi (who was Governor of Dnipropetrovsk Oblast during the 2014 pro-Russian conflict in Ukraine) is believed to have spent $10 million to create the unit.

Commander of the unit Yuriy Bereza is since the 2014 Ukrainian parliamentary election a member of the Ukrainian parliament for the People's Front; he was placed 10th on the party's election list. Member of the unit Volodymyr Parasyuk was also elected into parliament during these elections by winning the electoral district of Yavoriv with 56.56% of the votes.

The unit was involved in the liberation of Lyman during the 2022 Russian invasion of Ukraine.

== Human rights violations and war crimes ==
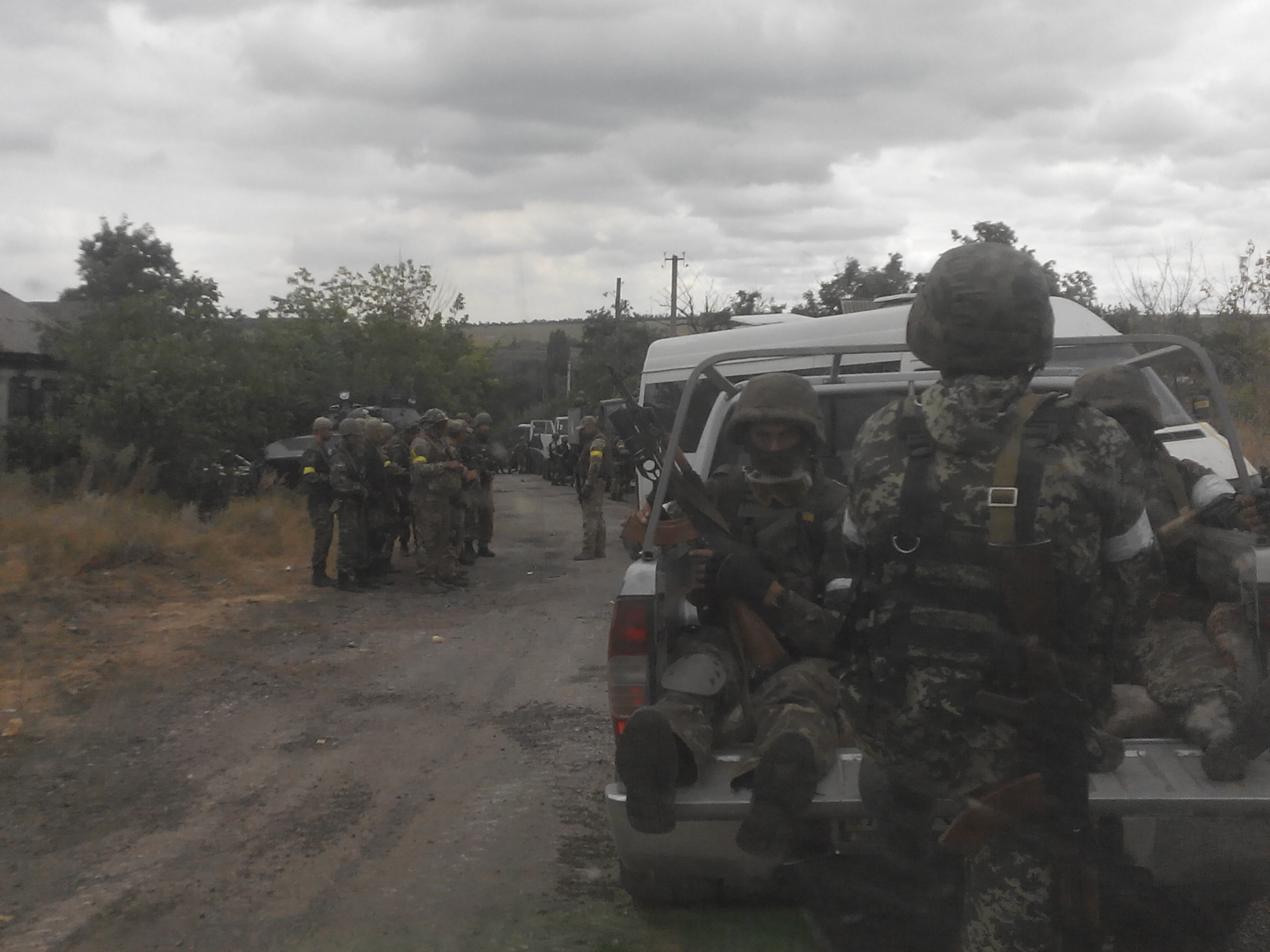
Dnipro-1 volunteers during the Battle of Ilovaisk, August 2014

- Reports (2016) published by the Office of the United Nations High Commissioner for Human Rights documented a worrying case of punitive damage to property in Donetsk by members of the armed groups targeting the house of a member of the Government-affiliated 'Dnipro-1' battalion. "On 20 January, a group of ‘Dnipro-1’ battalion members raided a house in Avdiivka, severely beating a man, subjecting him to asphyxiation with a plastic bag and mock execution."
- From the reports (2016) by Global Rights Compliance LLP: "For example, <UN Human Rights Monitoring Mission in Ukraine> has documented specific allegations of enforced disappearances, arbitrary detention and ill-treatment by the members of volunteer battalions such as "Aydar", "Dnipro-1", "Kyiv-1" and "Kyiv-2"; "The Volodymyr Kulmatytsky case gives rise to similar questions concerning the absence of war crimes charges. The accused persons in this case were charged with illegal confinement (Article 146(2)) and illegally handling arms (Article 263(1)). It is alleged that Mr Kulmatytsky, former deputy mayor of Sloviansk, was kidnapped by three soldiers and one commander (Mr. A) of the Battalion Dnipro-1 (Ukrainian police) and murdered later that day by Mr. A. Mr. A was informed that Mr. Kulmatytsky was involved in financing DPR formations".
- On 24 December 2014, Amnesty International reported that the unit was blocking humanitarian aid sent from Ukraine by another Ukrainian oligarch Rinat Akhmetov reaching the population in the separatist-controlled areas; over half the population in these areas depend on food aid. The reason the aid was being blocked by the Dnipro, Aidar and Donbas battalions is that the battalions "believe food and clothing are ending up in the wrong hands and may be sold instead of being given as humanitarian aid." Denis Krivosheev, acting Director of Europe and Central Asia for Amnesty International, stated that "using starvation of civilians as a method of warfare is a war crime".

== Structure ==
- Management & Headquarters
- 1st Armored Company
- 2nd Infantry Company
- 3rd Aerorozvidka Group
- 4th Kryvbas Company
- 5th Donetsk-1 Company
- 6th Krym Company
