= Eduard Sarapiy =

Ukrainian footballer

Personal information
- Full name: Eduard Yevhenovych Sarapiy
- Date of birth: 12 May 1999 (age 27)
- Place of birth: Zaporizhzhia, Ukraine
- Height: 1.86 m (6 ft 1 in)
- Position: Centre-back

Team information
- Current team: Polissya Zhytomyr
- Number: 5

Youth career
- 2005–2010: Metalurh Zaporizhzhia
- 2010–2016: Dynamo Kyiv

Senior career*
| Years | Team | Apps | (Gls) |
| 2016–2017 | Tavria-Skif Rozdol | 11 | (0) |
| 2017–2021 | Metalurh Zaporizhzhia | 86 | (31) |
| 2021–2023 | Metalist Kharkiv | 16 | (1) |
| 2022–2023 | → Dnipro-1 (loan) | 29 | (5) |
| 2023–2024 | Dnipro-1 | 27 | (1) |
| 2024– | Polissya Zhytomyr | 55 | (8) |

International career^{‡}
| 2016 | Ukraine U17 | 2 | (0) |
| 2026– | Ukraine | 8 | (0) |
- * Club domestic league appearances and goals as of 18 September 2026 ‡ National team caps and goals as of 18 November 2026

Eduard Yevhenovych Sarapiy (Ukrainian: Едуард Євгенович Сарапій; born 12 May 1999) is a Ukrainian professional footballer who plays as a centre-back for Polissya Zhytomyr and the Ukraine national team.

== Club career ==
=== Early years ===
Born in Zaporizhzhia, Sarapiy began his youth career at the local Metalurh Zaporizhzhia academy. In 2010, he moved to the Dynamo Kyiv academy.

=== Metalurh Zaporizhzhia ===
In 2017 he returned to Metalurh Zaporizhzhia in the Ukrainian Second League.

=== Metalist Kharkiv ===
In 2021 he transferred to Metalist Kharkiv in the Ukrainian First League.

==== Loan to Dnipro-1 ====
The following year he went on loan to Dnipro-1 in the Ukrainian Premier League. He made his debut for Dnipro on 28 August 2022, scoring a goal in a 3–0 victory over Dynamo Kyiv.

== International career ==
Sarapiy made two appearances for the Ukraine national under-17 football team in 2016. In September 2022, he was called up for the first time to the Ukraine national football team ahead of UEFA Nations League matches against Armenia and Scotland, but he did not appear in either match.

== Career statistics ==
=== Club ===
As of match played 20 September 2026

Appearances and goals by club, season and competition
| Club | Season | League | | | Cup | | Continental | | Other | | Total | |
| Club | Season | Division | Apps | Goals | Apps | Goals | Apps | Goals | Apps | Goals | Apps | Goals |
|---|---|---|---|---|---|---|---|---|---|---|---|---|
| Tavria-Skif Rozdol | 2016–17 | Ukrainian Amateur Football Championship | 11 | 0 | — | | — | | — | | 11 | 0 |
| Metalurh Zaporizhzhia | 2017–18 | Ukrainian Second League | 13 | 4 | 0 | 0 | — | | — | | 13 | 4 |
| Metalurh Zaporizhzhia | 2018–19 | Ukrainian Second League | 27 | 11 | 2 | 1 | — | | — | | 29 | 12 |
| Metalurh Zaporizhzhia | 2019–20 | Ukrainian Second League | 26 | 6 | 0 | 0 | — | | — | | 26 | 6 |
| Metalurh Zaporizhzhia | 2020–21 | Ukrainian Second League | 20 | 10 | 2 | 0 | — | | — | | 22 | 10 |
| Metalurh Zaporizhzhia | Total | | 86 | 31 | 4 | 1 | — | | — | | 90 | 32 |
| Metalist Kharkiv | 2021–22 | Ukrainian Second League | 16 | 1 | 3 | 0 | — | | — | | 19 | 1 |
| Dnipro-1 (loan) | 2022–23 | Ukrainian Premier League | 29 | 5 | — | | 9 (Note: Eight appearances in UEFA Europa League, one appearance in UEFA Conference League) | 0 | — | | 38 | 5 |
| Dnipro-1 | 2023–24 | Ukrainian Premier League | 27 | 1 | 1 | 0 | 5 (Note: Two appearances and one goal in UEFA Champions League, two appearances in UEFA Europa League, one appearance in UEFA Conference League) | 1 | — | | 33 | 1 |
| Polissya Zhytomyr | 2024–25 | Ukrainian Premier League | 21 | 2 | 3 | 0 | 2 (Note: Appearances in UEFA Conference League) | 0 | — | | 26 | 2 |
| Polissya Zhytomyr | 2025–26 | Ukrainian Premier League | 30 | 6 | 1 | 0 | 6 (Note: Appearances in UEFA Europa League) | 0 | — | | 37 | 6 |
| Polissya Zhytomyr | 2026–27 | Ukrainian Premier League | 4 | 0 | 1 | 0 | 1 | 0 | — | | 6 | 0 |
| Polissya Zhytomyr | Total | | 55 | 8 | 4 | 0 | 9 | 0 | — | | 68 | 8 |
| Career total | | | 224 | 46 | 13 | 1 | 23 | 1 | 0 | 0 | 260 | 47 |

=== International ===
As of match played 17 November 2026

Appearances and goals by national team and year
| National team | Year | Apps | Goals |
|---|---|---|---|
| Ukraine | 2026 | 8 | 0 |
| Total | | 8 | 0 |

== Honours ==
Individual

- SportArena Player of the Round: 2025–26 (Round 12)
