= Mykyta Kononov =

Ukrainian footballer

Personal information
- Full name: Mykyta Valentynovych Kononov
- Date of birth: 22 January 2003 (age 23)
- Place of birth: Dnipropetrovsk, Ukraine
- Height: 1.79 m (5 ft 10 in)
- Position: Right-back

Team information
- Current team: Poltava
- Number: 2

Youth career
- 2014–2019: Dnipro

Senior career*
Years	Team	Apps	(Gls)
2019–2024	Dnipro-1	4	(0)
2023–2024	→ UCSA Tarasivka (loan)	20	(1)
2024–2025	UCSA Tarasivka	8	(1)
2025–	Poltava	25	(0)

International career^{‡}
2019–2020	Ukraine U17	13	(2)
- * Club domestic league appearances and goals as of 3 June 2026 ‡ National team caps and goals as of 9 December 2023

Mykyta Kononov (Ukrainian: Микита Валентинович Кононов; born 22 January 2003) is a Ukrainian professional footballer who plays as a right-back for Poltava.

== Club career ==
=== Early years ===
Born in Dnipro, Kononov began his career in the Dnipro academy from his native city. Then he continued in the Dnipro-1 academy.

=== Dnipro-1 ===
In August 2019 he signed a contract with the newly promoted Ukrainian Premier League side Dnipro-1, but only played in the Ukrainian Premier League Reserves and made his debut in the Ukrainian Premier League as a second-half substitute player in the winning away match against Metalist Kharkiv on 23 October 2022.
