= Avanhard Stadium =

Avanhard Stadium (Ukrainian: Стадіон «Авангард») is number of stadiums in Ukraine. All the stadiums were part of the Soviet sports society of Ukrainian industries Avanhard. In 1987, along with Spartak and other sports societies, it was merged into the sport society of Trade Unions that existed until the fall of the Soviet Union.

It may refer to:

- Avanhard Stadium (Luhansk) in Luhansk, Ukraine
- Avanhard Stadium (Uzhhorod) in Uzhhorod, Ukraine
- Avanhard Stadium (Lutsk) in Lutsk, Ukraine
- Avanhard Stadium (Rivne) in Rivne, Ukraine
- Avanhard Stadium (Pripyat) in Pripyat, Ukraine
- Avanhard Stadium (Yalta) in Yalta, Ukraine
- Avanhard Stadium (Bakhmut) in Bakhmut, Ukraine
- Avanhard Stadium (Debaltseve) in Debaltseve, Ukraine

== Renamed stadiums ==
- Prapor Stadium in Kramatorsk, Ukraine, in 2011–2017 was known as Avanhard Stadium
- Ternopilsky Misky Stadion, in Ternopil, Ukraine, used to be known as Avanhard

== Russo-Ukraine war ==
The Bakhmut stadium saw heavy fighting in the Russian invasion of Ukraine. It was officially captured by Russian and Wagner forces on 4 April 2023.

The Luhansk stadium was closed in July 2014, due to the war in Donbas. It now lays under the control of the Luhansk People's Republic, and was reopened to host its own football team.

== See also ==
- Avangard Stadium, in Petropavl, Kazakhstan
- Avangard Stadium, in Vyborg, Russia
