= 2021–22 Ukrainian Amateur Cup =

2021-22 Ukrainian Cup for amateur teams
Tournament details
- Country: Ukraine
- Dates: 11 August 2021 – 2022 interrupted early due to the Russian full-scale invasion
- Teams: 26

Final positions
- Champions: none
- Ukrainian Cup: none

Tournament statistics
- Matches played: 43
- Goals scored: 137 (3.19 per match)
- Attendance: 8,369 (195 per match)

The 2021–22 Ukrainian Amateur Cup was the 26th season of the national football cup competition for amateur teams, which season started on August 18, 2021. The competition was abandoned at semifinals stage due to the Russian aggression.

The last season champion LNZ-Lebedyn was admitted to the 2021–22 Ukrainian Second League and was not eligible to compete.

== Participated clubs ==
In bold are clubs that were active at the same season AAFU championship (parallel round-robin competition).

- Dnipropetrovsk Oblast: **Lehioner Dnipro**
- Donetsk Oblast: Portovyk Mariupol
- Ivano-Frankivsk Oblast (2): Blaho-Yunist Verkhnia, Harda Kalush
- Kirovohrad Oblast: **Zirka Kropyvnytskyi**
- Kyiv Oblast (8): **Atlet Kyiv**, Druzhba Myrivka, Dzhuniors Shpytky, **Nyva Buzova**, **Olimpiysky Koledzh imeni Piddubnoho Kyiv (OKIP Kyiv)**, Ronin Lisne, Sokil Mykhailivka-Rubezhivka, **UCSA Kyiv**
- Luhansk Oblast: Skif Shulhynka
- Lviv Oblast (2): Kulykiv, Mykolaiv
- Poltava Oblast: **Olimpiya Savyntsi**
- Rivne Oblast (2): **Mayak Sarny**, **ODEK Orzhiv**
- ~~Sumy Oblast: Veleten Hlukhiv~~
- Vinnytsia Oblast: YaSKO Sharhorod
- Volyn Oblast: Lutsksantekhmontazh No.536 Lutsk
- Zakarpattia Oblast: Khust
- Zaporizhzhia Oblast (2): **Metalurh-2 Zaporizhia**, **Motor Zaporizhia**
- Zhytomyr Oblast (2): Polissia Stavky, **Zviahel Novohrad-Volynskyi**

Notes

- Olimpiya Savyntsi has competed also in the 2021–22 Ukrainian Cup.
- Portovyk Mariupol is a participant of the Zaporizhia Oblast championship due to the ongoing Russian occupation of eastern Ukraine.

== Bracket ==
The following is the bracket that demonstrates the last four rounds of the Ukrainian Cup, including the final match. Numbers in parentheses next to the match score represent the results of a penalty shoot-out.

Round of 16
FC Mykolaiv	2	4	6
Mayak Sarny	1	2	3
LSTM No.536 Lutsk	3	1	4
Blaho-Yunist Verkhnia	1	2	3
Druzhba Myrivka	2	2	4
YaSKO Sharhorod	0	2	2
Polissia Stavky	0	1	1
ODEK Orzhiv	1	8	9
Ronin Lisne	0	0	0
Olimpiya Savyntsi	2	3	5
Metalurh-2 Zaporizhzhia	1	4	5
Sokil Mykhailivka-Rubezhivka	0	2	2
Skif Shulhynka	0	0	0
Motor Zaporizhia	0	3	3
Nyva Buzova	3	2	5
Atlet Kyiv	2	0	2

Quarter-finals
LSTM No.536 Lutsk	0	1	1
FC Mykolaiv	1	3	4
ODEK Orzhiv	2	0	2
Druzhba Myrivka (a)	2	0	2
Olimpiya Savyntsi	4	1	5
Metalurh-2 Zaporizhia	0	1	1
Motor Zaporizhia	1	0	1 (4)
Nyva Buzova	0	1	1 (3)

Semi-finals
FC Mykolaiv
Druzhba Myrivka
Olimpiya Savyntsi
Motor Zaporizhia

Final
Mykolaiv/Druzhba
Olimpiya/Motor

== Results ==
=== Preliminary round ===
First leg games were scheduled to be played on 18 August and second leg on 25 August.

Team 1	Agg.	Team 2	1st leg	2nd leg
Skif Shulhynka	7–0	Portovyk Mariupol	4–0	3–0
Zirka Kropyvnytskyi	2–4	Ronin Lisne	1–0	1–4
FC Mykolaiv	1–0	Harda Kalush	1–0	0–0
Sokil Mykhailivka-Rubezhivka	5–2	Lehioner Dnipro	3–0	2–2
Polissia Stavky	9–3	OK im.Piddubnoho Kyiv	7–2	2–1
FC Kulykiv	6–6 (a)	LSTM No.536 Lutsk	3–4	3–2
Dzhuniors Shpytky	1–5	Atlet Kyiv	(0–3)	1–2
Blaho-Yunist Verkhnia	2–0	FC Khust	1–0	1–0
Druzhba Myrivka	8–2	UCSA Kyiv	5–0	3–2
Zviahel Novohrad-Volynskyi	2–4	YaSKO Sharhorod	2–3	0–1

Notes:

- Some dates were later adjusted. The legs for the match Sokil Mykhailivka-Rubezhivka and Lehioner Dnipro were reversed from the original draw. Several match pairs rescheduled their second leg to September 1.
- Scheduled for 18 August, the match Dzhuniors Shpytky and Atlet Kyiv did not take place. The hosting team failed to reserve an ambulance vehicle required by competition regulations. Dzuniors were awarded a technical loss (0:3).
- The original face off between Druzhba Myrivka and Veleten Hlukhiv was canceled soon after the draw. Some teams were re-drawn having their legs scheduled for September 1 and 8.

=== Round of 16 ===
Six other clubs Mayak Sarny, ODEK Orzhiv, Nyva Buzova, Olimpiya Savyntsi, Metalurh-2 Zaporizhia and Motor Zaporizhia received a bye to the round. First leg games were scheduled to be played on 8 September and second leg on 15 September.

Team 1	Agg.	Team 2	1st leg	2nd leg
Ronin Lisne	0 – 5	Olimpiya Savyntsi	0–2	0–3
Metalurh-2 Zaporizhia	5 – 2	Sokil Mykhailivka-Rubezhivka	1–0	4–2
Skif Shulhynka	0 – 3	Motor Zaporizhia	0–0	0–3
Polissia Stavky	1 – 9	ODEK Orzhiv	0–1	1–8
FC Mykolaiv	6 – 3	Mayak Sarny	2–1	4–2
LSTM No.536	4 – 3	Blaho-Yunist Verkhnia	3–1	1–2
Nyva Buzova	5 – 2	Atlet Kyiv	3–2	2–0
Druzhba Myrivka	4 – 2	YaSKO Sharhorod	2–0	2–2

=== Quarterfinals ===
First leg games were played on 29 September, second leg games on 5–6 October.

Team 1	Agg.	Team 2	1st leg	2nd leg
First leg – 29 September, Second leg – 5 October
Olimpiya Savyntsi	5 – 1	Metalurh-2 Zaporizhia	4–0	1–1
First leg – 29 September, Second leg – 6 October
LSTM No.536	1 – 4	FC Mykolaiv	0–1	1–3
ODEK Orzhiv	2 – 2 (a)	Druzhba Myrivka	2–2	0–0
Motor Zaporizhia	1 – 1 (4–3 p)	Nyva Buzova	1–0	0–1 (a.e.t.)

=== Semifinals ===
Team 1	Agg.	Team 2	1st leg	2nd leg
FC Mykolaiv	v	Druzhba Myrivka	–	–
Olimpiya Savyntsi	v	Motor Zaporizhia	–	–

== See also ==
- 2021–22 Ukrainian Football Amateur League
- 2021–22 Ukrainian Cup
