= Artur Vashchyshyn =

Ukrainian footballer

Personal information
- Full name: Artur Yaroslavovych Vashchyshyn
- Date of birth: 11 June 2000 (age 26)
- Place of birth: Dubno, Ukraine
- Height: 1.83 m (6 ft 0 in)
- Position: Right back

Team information
- Current team: Zviahel
- Number: 8

Youth career
- 2012–2016: VIK-Volyn Volodymyr-Volynskyi
- 2016–2017: Dynamo Kyiv

Senior career*
Years	Team	Apps	(Gls)
2017–2022	Dynamo Kyiv	0	(0)
2021	→ Chornomorets Odesa (loan)	3	(0)
2021	→ Podillya Khmelnytskyi (loan)	11	(0)
2022–	Zviahel	18	(16)

International career^{‡}
2016	Ukraine U16	7	(0)
2016–2017	Ukraine U17	16	(0)
2017	Ukraine U18	4	(1)
- * Club domestic league appearances and goals as of 15 June 2024 ‡ National team caps and goals as of 22 November 2021

Artur Yaroslavovych Vashchyshyn (Ukrainian: Артур Ярославович Ващишин; born 11 June 2000) is a Ukrainian professional footballer who plays as a right back for Zviahel.

== Career ==
Born in Dubno, Vashchyshyn began his career in the neighbouring youth football academy BRV-VIK Volodymyr and after continued in the Dynamo Kyiv youth sportive school.

He played in the Ukrainian Premier League Reserves and never made his debut for the senior Dynamo Kyiv's squad. In summer of 2018 Vashchyshyn was injured during training (tear of meniscus) and had a surgery.

In March 2021 Vashchyshyn signed a half-year loan contract with the Ukrainian First League's side Chornomorets Odesa and in July 2021 changed the loan team, and was transferred to another Ukrainian First League club, Podillya Khmelnytskyi.

His professional debut Vashchyshyn made in the Ukrainian First League for Chornomorets on 5 April 2021 in a home match against Prykarpattia when he came out on 67th minute as a substitute for Maksym Melnychuk. In total Vashchyshyn played only three games for the Odesa club, while being listed often for games as a substitute. After Chornomorets was promoted to the top tier, Vashchyshyn remained to play in the First League for Podillia. His debut for the club from Khmelnytskyi, Vashchyshyn made in the away match against regional rivals Epitsentr on 18 August 2021.
