= Artem Tyeryekhov =

Ukrainian footballer

Personal information
- Full name: Artem Vitaliyovych Tyeryekhov
- Date of birth: 31 March 1992 (age 34)
- Place of birth: Ilarionove, Ukraine
- Height: 1.86 m (6 ft 1 in)
- Position: Centre-back

Team information
- Current team: Kolos Kovalivka
- Number: 54

Youth career
- 2005–2006: SDYuShOR-2 Dniprodzerzhynsk
- 2006–2009: SDYuShOR-2 Dnipropetrovsk

Senior career*
Years	Team	Apps	(Gls)
2009–2014	Illichivets Mariupol	0	(0)
2014–2015	Bukovyna Chernivtsi	22	(2)
2015–2016	Hirnyk Kryvyi Rih	7	(0)
2016	→ Hirnyk-2 Kryvyi Rih	1	(0)
2016–2017	Bukovyna Chernivtsi	33	(2)
2017–2018	Obolon-Brovar Kyiv	32	(3)
2018–2019	Kolos Kovalivka	5	(0)
2019–2020	Obolon Kyiv	22	(1)
2020–2021	→ Obolon-2 Bucha	3	(0)
2021	Polissya Zhytomyr	22	(0)
2022–2023	Obolon Kyiv	19	(1)
2023–2024	Mariupol	44	(6)
2025–	Kolos Kovalivka	0	(6)
2025–	Kolos Kovalivka II	2	(6)
- * Club domestic league appearances and goals as of 14 June 2025

Artem Vitaliyovych Tyeryekhov (Ukrainian: Артем Віталійович Тєрєхов; born 31 March 1992) is a Ukrainian professional footballer who plays as a centre-back for Kolos Kovalivka.
