= Malá Ida =

Village and municipality in Slovakia

Malá Ida Kisida
- Municipality
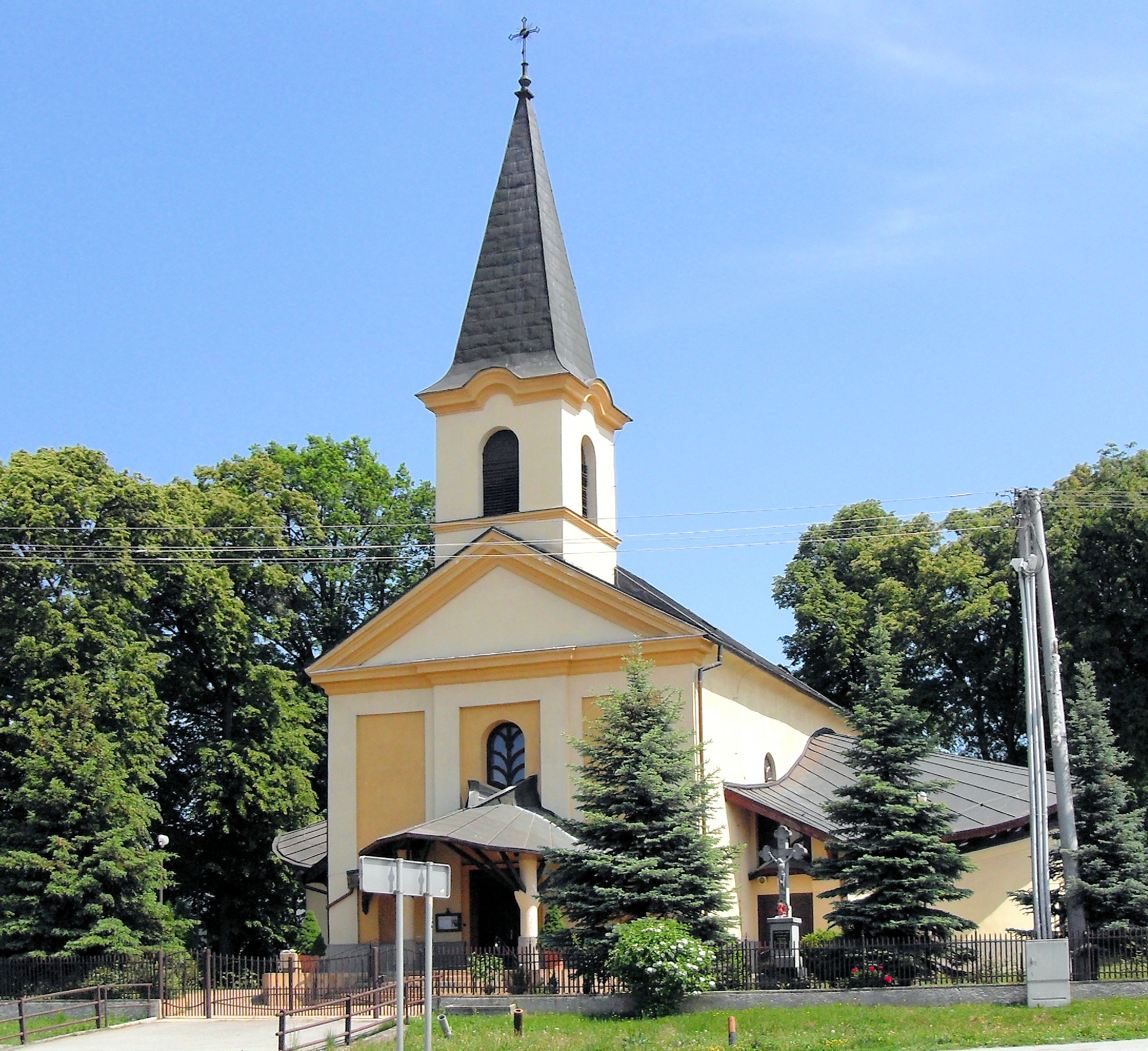

- Flag

- Location of Malá Ida in the Košice Region Location of Malá Ida in Slovakia
- Coordinates: 48.67°N 21.17°E
- Country: Slovakia
- Region: Košice Region
- District: Košice-okolie District
- First mentioned: 1280

Area
  - Total: 10.19 km^{2} (3.93 sq mi)
- Elevation: 292 m (958 ft)

Population (2025)
  - Total: 2,053
- Time zone: UTC+1 (CET)
  - Summer (DST): UTC+2 (CEST)
- Postal code: 442 0
- Area code: +421 55
- Vehicle registration plate (until 2022): KS
- Website: www.malaida.sk

Malá Ida (Hungarian: Kisida) is a village and municipality in Košice-okolie District in the Kosice Region of eastern Slovakia.

== History ==
In historical records the village was first mentioned in 1280.

== Geography ==
The municipality lies at an altitude of 292 metres (958 ft) and covers an area of 10.19 km^{2} (3.93 sq mi) (2025).

== Population ==
Population statistic (10 years)
Year	1995	2005	2015	2025
Count	837	1244	1517	2053
Difference		+48.62%	+21.94%	+35.33%

Population statistic
Year	2024	2025
Count	2010	2053
Difference		+2.13%

It has a population of 2053 people (31 December 2025).

=== Ethnicity ===
Census 2021 (1+ %)
Ethnicity	Number	Fraction
Slovak	1579	92.82%
Not found out	78	4.58%
Hungarian	40	2.35%
Rusyn	25	1.46%
Total	1701	

In year 2021 was 1701 people by ethnicity 1579 as Slovak, 78 as Not found out, 40 as Hungarian, 25 as Rusyn, 16 as Other, 12 as Czech, 7 as Ukrainian, 5 as German, 3 as Russian, 2 as Polish, 2 as English, 1 as Jewish and 1 as Vietnamese.

Note on population: The difference values of population numbers in the table "Population statistic" and in the sections "Ethnicity" & "Religion" is caused by the use of various statistical methods.

=== Religion ===
Census 2021 (1+ %)
Religion	Number	Fraction
Roman Catholic Church	1097	64.49%
None	335	19.69%
Greek Catholic Church	80	4.7%
Not found out	77	4.53%
Evangelical Church	33	1.94%
Total	1701	

In year 2021 was 1701 people by religion 1097 from Roman Catholic Church, 335 from None, 80 from Greek Catholic Church, 77 from Not found out, 33 from Evangelical Church, 16 from Calvinist Church, 14 from Eastern Orthodox Church, 10 from Apostolic Church, 8 from Ad hoc movements, 7 from Baptists Church, 4 from Other and not ascertained christian church, 4 from Other, 4 from Seventh-day Adventist Church, 3 from Jehovah's Witnesses, 3 from Islam, 2 from Jewish community, 2 from Buddhism, 1 from Paganism and natural spirituality and 1 from Christian Congregations in Slovakia.
