= Bohdan Kushnirenko =

Ukrainian footballer

Personal information
- Full name: Bohdan Serhiyovych Kushnirenko
- Date of birth: 2 November 1995 (age 31)
- Place of birth: Kyiv, Ukraine
- Height: 1.92 m (6 ft 4 in)
- Position: Defender

Team information
- Current team: Zorya Luhansk
- Number: 77

Youth career
- 2008–2009: Dynamo Kyiv
- 2010: Zirka Kyiv
- 2011–2012: Arsenal Kyiv

Senior career*
Years	Team	Apps	(Gls)
2012–2013	Arsenal Kyiv	0	(0)
2014	Metalist Kharkiv	0	(0)
2015	Chornomorets Odesa	0	(0)
2016–2018	Poltava	50	(4)
2018–2021	Mykolaiv	69	(16)
2018–2021	→ Mykolaiv-2	1	(0)
2021–2022	Vorskla Poltava	6	(0)
2022–2025	Polissya Zhytomyr	52	(11)
2025	LNZ Cherkasy	10	(0)
2025–	Zorya Luhansk	26	(2)

International career
2019	Ukraine (students)		
- * Club domestic league appearances and goals as of 18 OCtober 2026

Bohdan Serhiyovych Kushnirenko (Ukrainian: Богдан Сергійович Кушніренко; born 2 November 1995) is a Ukrainian professional footballer who plays as a defender for Zorya Luhansk.

== Career ==
Kushnirenko is a product of the different Kyivan School Systems.

He spent career in the different Ukrainian Premier League Reserves teams, but in March 2016 he signed contract with the Ukrainian First League team Poltava.
