= Yuriy Bereza =

Ukrainian politician and military commander

- Юрій Береза
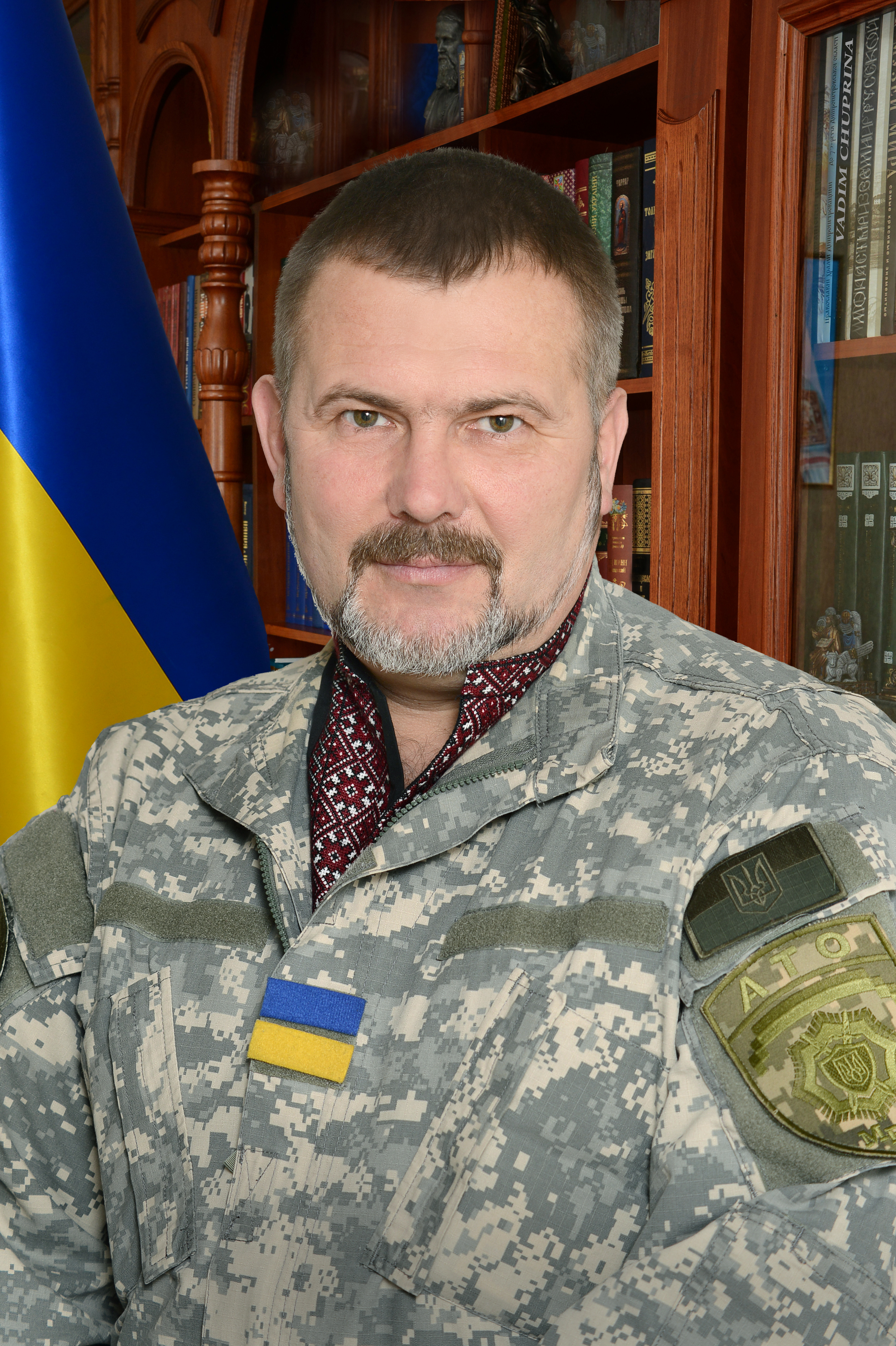
- Bereza in 2016

People's Deputy of Ukraine
- In office 27 November 2014 – 24 July 2019
- Constituency: People's Front, No. 10

Personal details
- Born: 8 February 1970 (age 56) Saksahan, Ukrainian SSR, Soviet Union (now Ukraine)
- Party: People's Front
- Education: Taras Shevchenko National University of Kyiv

Military service
- Allegiance: Ukraine
- Branch/service: Ukrainian Ground Forces (1992-2003); National Police of Ukraine
- Years of service: 1992-2003, 2014
- Rank: Major
- Unit: Dnipro-1 Regiment

Yuriy Mykolayovych Bereza (Ukrainian: Юрій Миколайович Береза; born 8 February 1970) is a Ukrainian politician and the commander of the Dnipro Battalion.

== Biography ==
Representing People's Front, he was elected to the Verkhovna Rada in the 2014 Ukrainian parliamentary election. In the July 2019 Ukrainian parliamentary election Bereza was not re-elected. As an independent candidate in constituency 24 (in Dnipropetrovsk Oblast) he gained 7.55% of the vote and lost the election to Dmytro Kysylevskyi of the party Servant of the People (who won with 59.36% of the votes)

In 2018 he was involved in a parliamentary brawl, ultimately punching Nestor Shufrych, after a member accused another of being 'Putin's agent' using a poster.

== Awards ==
- In September 2014, he was awarded the Order of Bohdan Khmelnytsky, 3rd class.
