= SC Dnipro-1 =

Dnipro-1
- Full name: Спортивний клуб «Дніпро-1» Sport Club Dnipro-1
- Founded: 29 November 2015; 10 years ago
- Dissolved: 22 July 2024; 2 years ago
- Ground: Dnipro-Arena, Dnipro
- Capacity: 31,003 (Dnipro)
- Owner(s): Maksym Bereza (50%); Andriy Rusol (50%); Yuriy Bereza (honorary president)
- General Director: Anton Fursov
- 2023–24: Ukrainian Premier League, 4th of 16 (Withdrew)
- Website: scdnipro1.com.ua
Home colours	Away colours

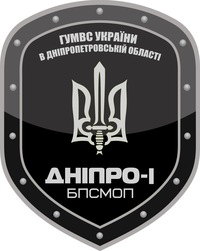
Emblem of the Police Special Patrol Detachment "Dnipro-1", Ministry of Internal Affairs in Dnipropetrovsk Oblast

SC Dnipro-1 (Ukrainian: СК «Дніпро-1») was a Ukrainian professional football club from Dnipro. While not officially a successor of FC Dnipro, SC Dnipro-1 took over all of the infrastructure of the former club including its academy. Founded in November 2015, SC Dnipro-1 gained promotion from the First League in in 2019 and most recently competed in the Ukrainian Premier League. The club collapsed and withdrew from professional football in July 2024.

Founded in 2015, the club had been officially registered as a limited liability society "Sports Club Dnipro-1" (Ukrainian: Товариство з обмеженою відповідальністю “Спортивний клуб “Дніпро-1”).

== History ==
The club owners are Maksym Bereza and Andriy Rusol, with Hennadiy Polonskyi recognized as one of the founders. Former Ukrainian international footballer Andriy Rusol became the executive director in 2019, following the bankruptcy of FC Dnipro, where he had previously played and served as an executive for six years. SC Dnipro-1 adopted an emblem and name similar to the Special Tasks Patrol Police Dnipro-1, which features the Lisovskyi tryzub. The Dnipro-1 Ukrainian volunteer battalion, formed during the initial phase of the Russo-Ukrainian War (War in Donbas), was once led by Maksym Bereza's father Yuriy Bereza.

The Professional Football League of Ukraine approved the admission of the club to the professional league system on 21 June 2017.

On 6 July 2017, it was announced that SC Dnipro-1 would adopt the FC Dnipro football school. The same day, the club announced its squad for the upcoming 2017–18 Ukrainian Second League season, which included well-known Ukrainian footballers such as Yevhen Cheberyachko, Serhiy Kravchenko and many others.

SC Dnipro-1 played its first professional match on 9 July 2017, against FC Bukovyna Chernivtsi in the 2017–18 Ukrainian Cup. The club's first official league match took place a week later, on 15 July 2017, against FC Metalist 1925 Kharkiv in the 2017–18 Ukrainian Second League. During that season, Dnipro-1 made history by becoming only the second club to reach the Ukrainian Cup semifinals while competing in the third tier. The team also secured promotion by finishing first in its group.

As champions of the 2018–19 Ukrainian First League, SC Dnipro-1 earned promotion to the Ukrainian Premier League (UPL) in 2019.

During the 2022 Russian invasion of Ukraine, Dnipro-1 played its 2022–23 UEFA Europa Conference League matches at Košická futbalová aréna in Košice, Slovakia. The club conducted training sessions in nearby Malá Ida and fulfilled its domestic league fixtures in Uzhhorod. Many first-team members temporarily relocated to Košice for the duration of the campaign.

In the 2023–24 season, Dnipro-1, as runners-up in the 2022-23 UPL, set a new record among Ukrainian clubs by being eliminated from all three European club competitions within a single month. Additionally, FIFA imposed a transfer ban on the club during the 2023–24 winter break following legal disputes with former manager Igor Jovicevic. Oleksandr Kucher also revealed he had not received compensation from the club but chose not to pursue legal arbitration with the club. Despite these challenges, the team finished fourth in the league, securing a place in the Conference League second qualifying round.

Before the start of the 2024–25 season, speculation regarding SC Dnipro-1's financial insolvency. On 9 July 2024, the Ukrainian Premier League (UPL) set the player registration dates for participating clubs, including Dnipro-1, Polissia, Kryvbas, Shakhtar, and Dynamo, with registration scheduled for 15 July 2024. However, by 16 July, Dnipro-1 failed to register its players, prompting the UPL to convene a general meeting. At the meeting, it was decided to petition the Ukrainian Association of Football (UAF) to revoke Dnipro-1's professional status and propose replacing the team's spot in the UPL with one of four other clubs: Mynai, Metalist 1925, Epitsentr, or Livyi Bereh.

On 18 July 2024, the UAF responded to the UPL, stating it could not permit Dnipro-1's permission to operate professionally, as the club met all minimum requirements. Nevertheless, the UPL retained the authority to bar the club from its competitions. On 19 July 2024, a subsequent general meeting approved Dnipro-1's request to withdraw from the League. The participants submitted two replacement proposals to the UAF Executive Committee: (1) award Mynai the spot, as they received the most votes, or (2) hold a transitional tournament involving the four candidate teams.

On 22 July 2024, the UEFA Appeals Committee declared Dnipro-1's remaining matches in the Conference League second qualifying round as forfeits by the club.

== Collapse of FC Dnipro ==
In 2018, FC Dnipro was forced into bankruptcy by FIFA due to numerous legal claims over unpaid monetary compensation to players and managers.

Several individuals from the former FC Dnipro who were never paid include Egídio Pereira Júnior, Danilo Sousa Campos, manager Juande Ramos and his coaching staff, Jaba Kankava, Vitaliy Mandzyuk, and others.

On 22 February 2021, FIFA dismissed Jaba Kankava's claim in which he sought to have SC Dnipro-1 recognized as the sporting successor to FC Dnipro, aiming to recover his unpaid wages.

Some former players speculated the creation of SC Dnipro-1, without officially being the successor of FC Dnipro, to be a ponzi scheme.

== Coaches and administration ==
Administration	Coaching	Coaching youth
Honorary President – Yuriy Bereza; President – Maksym Bereza; General director – Anton Fursov; Executive director – Andriy Rusol	Head coach –; Assistant coach -; Goalkeeper coach –	Head coach – Hennadiy Shchekotylin; Assistant coach – Ivan Telko; Fitness coach – Anton Dyachenko; Goalies coach – Volodymyr Timenko

== League and cup history ==
Season	Div.	Pos.	Pl.	W	D	L	GS	GA	P	Cup	Europe		Notes
2017–18	3rd (Druha Liha)	1	33	26	3	4	87	15	81	1/2 finals			Promoted
2018–19	2nd (Persha Liha)	1	28	21	4	3	72	21	67	1/2 finals			Promoted
2019–20	1st (Premier Liha)	7	32	15	4	13	42	42	49	1/8 finals			EL play-offs – 1/2 finals
2020–21	1st (Premier Liha)	7	26	8	6	12	36	38	30	1/4 finals			
2021–22	1st (Premier Liha)	3	18	13	1	4	35	17	40	1/4 finals			
2022–23	1st (Premier Liha)	2	30	21	4	5	61	27	67	None	ECL	KPO	
2023–24	1st (Premier Liha)	4	30	14	10	6	40	27	52	1/8 finals	ECL	PO	
2024–25	1st (Premier Liha)	failed to start									ECL	2QR	

== European record ==
Season	Competition	Round	Opponent	Home	Away	Aggregate
2022–23	UEFA Europa League	PO	(Cyprus) AEK Larnaca	1–2	0–3	1–5
2022–23	UEFA Europa Conference League	Group E	(Netherlands) AZ	0–1	1–2	2nd
2022–23	UEFA Europa Conference League	Group E	(Cyprus) Apollon Limassol	1–0	3–1	2nd
2022–23	UEFA Europa Conference League	Group E	(Liechtenstein) Vaduz	2–2	2–1	2nd
2022–23	UEFA Europa Conference League	KPO	(Cyprus) AEK Larnaca	0–0	0–1	0–1
2023–24	UEFA Champions League	2QR	(Greece) Panathinaikos	1–3	2–2	3–5
2023–24	UEFA Europa League	3QR	(Czech Republic) Slavia Prague	1–1	0–3	2–5
2023–24	UEFA Europa Conference League	PO	(Slovakia) Spartak Trnava	1–2 (a.e.t.)	1–1	2–3
2024–25	UEFA Conference League	2QR	(Hungary) Puskás Akadémia	0–3 awd.	0–3 awd.	0–6

Notes

- PO: Play-off round

=== UEFA club coefficient ranking ===
As of 12 June 2024

Rank	Team	Points
139	(Cyprus) Apollon	11.000
140	(Slovenia) Ljubljana	10.500
141	(Ukraine) Dnipro-1	10.500
142	(Romania) FCSB	10.500
143	(Faroe Islands) KÍ	10.000

=== UEFA Rankings since 2022 ===
As of 14 June 2024

Season	Ranking	Movement	Points	Change
2022–23	166	0	8.000	0.000
2023–24	141	25	10.500	2.500

=== Elo ranking ===
As of 14 June 2023

Rank	Team	Points
256	(Serbia) Partizan	1452
257	(Germany) Bielefeld	1452
258	(Ukraine) Dnipro-1	1451
259	(Hungary) Ferencváros	1450
260	(Poland) Piast Gliwice	1449

== Honours ==
- Ukrainian Premier League
  - Runners-up (1): 2022–23
- Ukrainian First League
  - Winners (1): 2018–19
- Ukrainian Second League
  - Runners-up (1): 2017–18

== Reserves ==
=== Dnipro-1-Borysfen ===
In 2019, the club also fielded its reserve team in amateur competitions SC Dnipro-1-Borysfen that previously (in 2018–19) played at the Youth League and PFL under-19 competitions. The team played in the under-19 competitions along with SC Dnipro-1 under-19 team which won the competitions.

Season	Div.	Pos.	Pl.	W	D	L	GS	GA	P	Cup	Europe	Notes
2019–20	4th (Amatorska Liha)	9_{/10}	18	1	1	16	3	24	4			competition was interrupted
2020–21	4th (Amatorska Liha)	10_{/12}	22	5	0	17	23	53	15			late start; withdrew

== Coaching history ==
- (Ukraine) Dmytro Mykhaylenko (6 July 2017 – 18 September 2020)
- (Croatia) Igor Jovićević (22 September 2020 – 13 July 2022)
- (Ukraine) Oleksandr Kucher (29 July 2022 – 20 August 2023)
- (Ukraine) Valeriy Horodov (21 August 2023 – 14 September 2023)
- (Ukraine) Yuriy Maksymov (14 September 2023 – 19 July 2024)
