= 2016–17 FC Zorya Luhansk season =

Zorya Luhansk
2016-17 season
- President: Yevhen Heller
- Manager: Yuriy Vernydub
- Stadium: Slavutych Arena, Zaporizhia
- Ukrainian Premier League: 3rd
- Ukrainian Cup: Round of 16 (1/8)
- UEFA Europa League: Group stage
- Top goalscorer: League: Rafael Forster (6); Oleksandr Karavayev (6); Emmanuel Bonaventure Dennis (6); All: Rafael Forster (8)
Home colours	Away colours

The 2016–17 season was 16th season in the top Ukrainian football league for Zorya Luhansk. Zorya competed in Premier League, Ukrainian Cup and UEFA Europa League. Finishing on third place in Premier League Zorya qualified to Europa League group stage for next season.

== Players ==
=== Squad information ===
Squad no.	Name	Nationality	Position	Date of birth (age)
Goalkeepers
1	Oleksiy Shevchenko	(Ukraine)	GK	24 February 1992 (aged 25)
77	Oleh Chuvayev	(Ukraine) (Russia)	GK	25 October 1987 (aged 29)
91	Ihor Levchenko	(Ukraine)	GK	23 February 1991 (aged 26)
Defenders
2	Artem Sukhotskyi	(Ukraine)	DF	6 December 1992 (aged 24)
5	Artem Hordiyenko	(Ukraine)	DF	4 March 1991 (aged 26)
12	Rafael Forster	(Brazil)	DF	23 July 1990 (aged 26)
16	Hryhoriy Yarmash	(Ukraine)	DF	4 January 1985 (aged 32)
23	Mykhaylo Shershen ^{List B}	(Ukraine)	DF	27 April 1995 (aged 22)
39	Yevhen Opanasenko	(Ukraine)	DF	25 August 1990 (aged 26)
44	Vyacheslav Checher	(Ukraine)	DF	15 December 1980 (aged 36)
95	Eduard Sobol ^{List B} (on loan from Shakhtar Donetsk)	(Ukraine)	DF	20 May 1995 (aged 22)
99	Andriy Pylyavskyi (on loan from Rubin Kazan)	(Ukraine)	DF	4 December 1988 (aged 28)
Midfielders
4	Ihor Chaykovskyi	(Ukraine)	MF	7 October 1991 (aged 25)
6	Mykyta Kamenyuka (Captain)	(Ukraine)	MF	3 June 1985 (aged 32)
7	Ivan Petryak (on loan from Shakhtar Donetsk)	(Ukraine)	MF	13 March 1994 (aged 23)
8	Ihor Kharatin ^{List B}	(Ukraine)	MF	2 February 1995 (aged 22)
10	Jaba Lipartia	(Georgia (country))	MF	16 November 1987 (aged 29)
15	Vladyslav Kalitvintsev (on loan from Dynamo Kyiv)	(Ukraine)	MF	4 January 1993 (aged 24)
17	Gegham Kadymyan	(Armenia)	MF	19 October 1992 (aged 24)
22	Željko Ljubenović	(Serbia)	MF	9 July 1981 (aged 35)
24	Dmytro Hrechyshkin (on loan from Shakhtar Donetsk)	(Ukraine)	MF	22 September 1991 (aged 25)
32	Anđelo Kačavenda ^{List B}	(Serbia)	MF	22 January 1999 (aged 18)
36	Ruslan Babenko	(Ukraine)	MF	8 July 1992 (aged 24)
76	Yehor Shalfeyev ^{List B}	(Ukraine)	MF	3 October 1998 (aged 18)
Forwards
9	Vladyslav Kulach (on loan from Shakhtar Donetsk)	(Ukraine)	FW	7 May 1993 (aged 24)
11	Paulinho	(Brazil)	FW	29 May 1993 (aged 24)
21	Denys Bezborodko (on loan from Shakhtar Donetsk)	(Ukraine)	FW	31 May 1994 (aged 23)
42	Emmanuel Bonaventure Dennis ^{List B}	(Nigeria)	FW	15 November 1997 (aged 19)
49	Dmytro Lukanov	(Ukraine)	FW	2 March 1995 (aged 22)

== Transfers ==
=== In ===
Date	Pos.	Player	Age	Moving from	Type	Fee	Source
Summer
18 July 2016	GK	(Ukraine) Oleh Chuvayev	29	(Russia) Tom Tomsk	Transfer	Undisclosed	
25 August 2016	MF	(Ukraine) Ihor Kharatin	21	(Ukraine) Dynamo Kyiv	Transfer	Undisclosed	
24 June 2016	FW	(Ukraine) Vladyslav Kulach	23	(Ukraine) Shakhtar Donetsk	Loan		
3 July 2016	DF	(Ukraine) Eduard Sobol	21	(Ukraine) Shakhtar Donetsk	Loan		
31 May 2016	GK	(Ukraine) Andriy Poltavtsev	24	(Georgia (country)) Guria Lanchkhuti	Loan return		
Winter
11 December 2016	MF	(Ukraine) Ruslan Babenko	24	(Norway) Bodø/Glimt	Transfer	Free	
16 January 2017	FW	(Armenia) Gegham Kadymyan	24	(Ukraine) Karpaty Lviv	Transfer	Free	
23 January 2017	MF	(Serbia) Anđelo Kačavenda	18	(Serbia) Vojvodina	Transfer	Free	
1 January 2017	MF	(Ukraine) Maksym Banasevych	21	(Ukraine) Desna Chernihiv	Loan return		
31 January 2017	MF	(Ukraine) Vladyslav Kalitvintsev	24	(Ukraine) Dynamo Kyiv	Loan		
22 February 2017	DF	(Ukraine) Andriy Pylyavskyi	28	(Russia) Rubin Kazan	Loan		

=== Out ===
Date	Pos.	Player	Age	Moving to	Type	Fee	Source
Summer
17 August 2016	MF	(Ukraine) Kyrylo Doroshenko	27	(Ukraine) Illichivets Mariupol	Transfer	Undisclosed	
31 May 2016	GK	(Ukraine) Mykyta Shevchenko	23	(Ukraine) Shakhtar Donetsk	Loan return		
31 May 2016	MF	(Ukraine) Andriy Totovytskyi	23	(Ukraine) Shakhtar Donetsk	Loan return		
31 May 2016	MF	(Ukraine) Vyacheslav Tankovskyi	21	(Ukraine) Shakhtar Donetsk	Loan return		
31 May 2016	FW	(Ukraine) Pylyp Budkivskyi	24	(Ukraine) Shakhtar Donetsk	Loan return		
Winter
19 January 2017	MF	(Belarus) Mikhail Sivakow	29	(Russia) FC Orenburg	Transfer	Free	
23 February 2017	FW	(Ukraine) Yaroslav Kvasov	24	(Georgia (country)) Dinamo Batumi	Transfer	Free	
25 February 2017	DF	(Ukraine) Yevhen Tkachuk	25	(Kazakhstan) Irtysh Pavlodar	Transfer	Free	
2 March 2017	MF	(Ukraine) Maksym Banasevych	21	(Ukraine) Desna Chernihiv	Transfer	Free	
1 January 2017	MF	(Ukraine) Oleksandr Karavayev	24	(Ukraine) Shakhtar Donetsk	Loan return		
2 March 2017	GK	(Ukraine) Andriy Poltavtsev	25	(Ukraine) Avanhard Kramatorsk	Loan?		

== Pre-season and friendlies ==
24 June 2016 Friendly	Zorya Luhansk (Ukraine)	2–0	(Ukraine) Illichivets Mariupol	Zaporizhia
17:00 EEST (UTC+03:00)	Kvasov 9'; Checher 80'	Report		Stadium: Torpedo Stadium

29 June 2016 Friendly	Zorya Luhansk (Ukraine)	1–3	(Serbia) Crvena Zvezda	Slovenia
18:30 EEST (UTC+03:00)	Paulinho 5'	Report	43'; Avramovski 77' (pen.); 79'

2 July 2016 Friendly	Zorya Luhansk (Ukraine)	1–0	(Croatia) HNK Rijeka	Slovenia
18:30 EEST (UTC+03:00)	Lipartia 66'	Report

6 July 2016 Friendly	Zorya Luhansk (Ukraine)	0–0	(Romania) Dinamo București	Slovenia
19:00 EEST (UTC+03:00)		Report

8 July 2016 Friendly	Zorya Luhansk (Ukraine)	0–0	(Romania) CFR Cluj	Slovenia
19:00 EEST (UTC+03:00)		Report

11 July 2016 Friendly	Zorya Luhansk (Ukraine)	2–1	(Serbia) FK Voždovac	Slovenia
19:00 EEST (UTC+03:00)	Ljubenović 52'; Petryak 52'	Report	60'

17 July 2016 Friendly	Zorya Luhansk (Ukraine)	6–0	(Ukraine) Illichivets Mariupol	Zaporizhia
17:00 EEST (UTC+03:00)	Dennis 3'; Hordiyenko 14'; Ljubenović 40'; Paulinho 67'; Checher 85'; Lipartia 89'	Report		Stadium: Torpedo Stadium

3 September 2016 Friendly	Zorya Luhansk (Ukraine)	1–1	(Ukraine) Dnipro	Zaporizhia
16:00 EEST (UTC+03:00)	Ljubenović 17'	Report	Bokhashvili 44'	Stadium: Torpedo Stadium

9 October 2016 Friendly	Zorya Luhansk (Ukraine)	3–1	(Ukraine) FC Oleksandriya	Zaporizhia
15:00 EEST (UTC+03:00)	Matvyeyev 10' (o.g.); Bonaventure 27'; Hrechyshkin 37'	Report	Matvyeyev 32'	Stadium: Torpedo Stadium

13 November 2016 Friendly	Zorya Luhansk (Ukraine)	Cancelled	(Ukraine) Zirka Kropyvnytskyi	Zaporizhia
15:00 EET (UTC+02:00)		Report		Stadium: Torpedo Stadium

13 November 2016 Friendly	Zorya Luhansk (Ukraine)	2–2	(Ukraine) Zorya Luhansk U-21	Zaporizhia
13:00 EEST (UTC+03:00)	Kulach 27'; Hrechyshkin 68' (pen.)	Report	Kvasov 2'; Radchenko 47'	Stadium: Torpedo Stadium

29 January 2017 Friendly	Zorya Luhansk (Ukraine)	0–2	(Bulgaria) Ludogorets Razgrad	Belek, Turkey
16:30 EET (UTC+02:00)		Report	Dyakov 31'; Quixadá 78'

1 February 2017 Friendly	Zorya Luhansk (Ukraine)	3–0	(Czech Republic) FC Slovácko	Turkey
14:30 EET (UTC+02:00)	Lipartia 47', 87'; Bonaventure 53'	Report

4 February 2017 Friendly	Zorya Luhansk (Ukraine)	2–2	(Croatia) Dinamo Zagreb	Turkey
17:00 EET (UTC+02:00)	Kharatin 10'; Rafael Forster 59' (pen.)	Report	Hodžić 34'; Machado 55'

6 February 2017 Friendly	Zorya Luhansk (Ukraine)	2–0	(Uzbekistan) Olmaliq FK	Turkey
15:00 EET (UTC+02:00)	Bonaventure 37'; Petryak 87'	Report

12 February 2017 Friendly	Zorya Luhansk (Ukraine)	1–0	(Uzbekistan) Lokomotiv Tashkent	Turkey
14:30 EET (UTC+02:00)	Sukhotskyi 84'	Report

14 February 2017 Friendly	FC Astana (Kazakhstan)	1–0	(Ukraine) Zorya Luhansk	Turkey
15:00 EET (UTC+02:00)	Muzhikov 55'	Report

16 February 2017 Friendly	Zorya Luhansk (Ukraine)	1–1	(Kazakhstan) Shakhter Karagandy	Turkey
15:00 EET (UTC+02:00)	Kadymyan 38'	Report	10'

19 February 2017 Friendly	Zorya Luhansk (Ukraine)	0–2	(Belarus) Torpedo-BelAZ Zhodino	Turkey
15:00 EET (UTC+02:00)		Report	Khachaturyan 16' (pen.); Afanasyev 18'

22 February 2017 Friendly	Zorya Luhansk (Ukraine)	Cancelled	(Georgia (country)) Dinamo Batumi	Turkey
EET (UTC+02:00)		Report

22 February 2017 Friendly	Zorya Luhansk (Ukraine)	0–1	(Armenia) Shirak Gyumri	Turkey
14:30 EET (UTC+02:00)		Report	16'

== Competitions ==
=== Overall ===
Competition	Started round	Final position	First match	Last match
Premier League	Matchday 1	3rd	24 July 2016	31 May 2017
Cup	Round of 16	Round of 16	26 October 2016	26 October 2016
Europa League	Group stage	Group stage	26 July 2016	8 December 2016

Last updated:

=== Premier League ===
==== League table ====
Pos	Team	Pld	W	D	L	GF	GA	GD	Pts	Qualification or relegation
1	Shakhtar Donetsk (C)	32	25	5	2	66	24	+42	80	Qualification for the Champions League group stage
2	Dynamo Kyiv	32	21	4	7	69	33	+36	67	Qualification for the Champions League third qualifying round
3	Zorya Luhansk	32	16	6	10	45	31	+14	54	Qualification for the Europa League group stage (Note: Since winners of 2016–17 Ukrainian Cup, Shakhtar Donetsk, qualified for European competition based on their league position, the spot awarded to the cup winner (Europa League group stage) was passed to the third-placed team and the spot for the third-placed team (Europa League third qualifying round) was passed to the fifth-placed team.)
4	Olimpik Donetsk	32	11	11	10	33	44	−11	44	Qualification for the Europa League third qualifying round
5	FC Oleksandriya	32	10	10	12	41	43	−2	40	Qualification for the Europa League third qualifying round
6	Chornomorets Odesa	32	10	8	14	25	37	−12	38	

Source: UEFA, Ukrainian Premier League, Soccerway
Rules for classification: 1) Points; 2) Goal difference; 3) Goals scored; 4) Head-to-head points; 5) Head-to-head goal difference; 6) Head-to-head goals scored; 7) Draw.
(C) Champions

==== Results summary ====
Overall								Home						Away					
Pld	W	D	L	GF	GA	GD	Pts	W	D	L	GF	GA	GD	W	D	L	GF	GA	GD
32	16	6	10	45	31	+14	54	8	1	7	27	19	+8	8	5	3	18	12	+6

Last updated: 31 May 2017.
Source: Competitive matches

==== Results by round ====
Round	1	2	3	4	5	6	7	8	9	10	11	12	13	14	15	16	17	18	19	20	21	22	23	24	25	26	27	28	29	30	31	32
Ground	A	H	A	H	A	H	A	A	H	A	H	H	A	H	A	H	A	H	H	A	H	A	H	A	H	H	A	A	H	A	A	H
Result	W	D	W	W	W	L	D	W	W	L	W	W	W	D	L	D	L	W	L	W	L	W	L	D	L	L	D	L	W	W	W	W
Position	4	4	3	3	3	3	3	2	2	3	3	2	2	3	3	3	3	3	3	3	3	3	3	3	3	3	3	3	3	3	3	3

Updated to match(es) played on 31 May 2017. Source: Competitive matches
A = Away; H = Home; W = Win; D = Draw; L = Loss

==== Matches ====
24 July 2016 1	Zorya Luhansk	3–0	Olimpik Donetsk	Zaporizhia
17:00 EEST (UTC+03:00)	Bonaventure 19', (yellow card) 19'; Ljubenović 26'; Hrechyshkin (yellow card) 61'; Tkachuk (yellow card) 65', (goal) 90'	Report	Drachenko (yellow card) 64'	Stadium: Slavutych-Arena; Attendance: 1,300; Referee: Kateryna Monzul

30 July 2016 2	Zirka Kropyvnytskyi	1–1	Zorya Luhansk	Kropyvnytskyi
19:30 EEST (UTC+03:00)	Lupashko (yellow card) 67'; Popov (yellow card) 80'; Kucherenko 87' (pen.)	Report	Hordiyenko 73'; Tkachuk (yellow card) 86'; Shevchenko (yellow card) 89'	Stadium: Zirka Stadium; Attendance: 6,188; Referee: Dmytro Kutakov

7 August 2016 3	Zorya Luhansk	4–0	Chornomorets Odesa	Zaporizhia
19:30 EEST (UTC+03:00)	Karavayev 15', 30'; Petryak 22'; Checher (yellow card) 48'; Sivakow (yellow card) 71'; Chaykovskyi 73'	Report	Filimonov (yellow card) 11'; Azatskyi (yellow card) 34'; Khocholava (yellow card) 54'; Petko (yellow card) 79'; Kabayev (yellow card) 80'; Korkishko (yellow card) 90+2'	Stadium: Slavutych-Arena; Attendance: 1,300; Referee: Oleksandr Ivanov

13 August 2016 4	FC Oleksandriya	0–1	Zorya Luhansk	Oleksandriya
19:30 EEST (UTC+03:00)	Putrash (yellow card) 34'; Tsurikov (yellow card) 39'; Banada (yellow card) 69'; Ponomar (yellow card) 71'; Shendrik (yellow card) 77'	Report	Petryak 17'; Sivakov (yellow card) 63'; Checher (yellow card) 84'	Stadium: CSC Nika; Attendance: 1,641; Referee: Serhiy Boyko

21 August 2016 5	Zorya Luhansk	2–1	Karpaty Lviv	Zaporizhya
19:30 EEST (UTC+03:00)	Kamenyuka (yellow card) 13'; Hordiyenko 20'; Ljubenović (yellow card) 38'; Paulinho (yellow card) 80'; Karavayev 87'	Report	Kravets (yellow card) 70'; Nesterov (yellow card) 78'; Lobay 89'	Stadium: Slavutych-Arena; Attendance: 1,851; Referee: Serhiy Berezka

26 August 2016 6	Dnipro	2–0	Zorya Luhansk	Dnipro
19:00 EEST (UTC+03:00)	Rotan 3', (yellow card) 50'; Kravchenko (yellow card) 65'; Balanyuk 90+2'	Report		Stadium: Dnipro-Arena; Attendance: 6,199; Referee: Yuriy Mozharovsky

10 September 2016 7	Zorya Luhansk	2–2	Stal Kamianske	Zaporizhia
17:00 EEST (UTC+03:00)	Sukhotskyi (yellow card) 23'; Ljubenović 80'; Karavayev 78'; Petryak (yellow card) 23'	Report	Karikari 16'; Voronin (yellow card) 26' (yellow-red card) 47'; Edgar Malakyan (yellow card) 50'; Vasin 55'; Pashayev (yellow card) 67'; Karasyuk (yellow card) 79'; Gor Malakyan (yellow card) 84'; Gor Malakyan (red card) 84'; Pankiv (yellow card) 90+1'	Stadium: Slavutych-Arena; Attendance: 1,200; Referee: Anatoliy Zhabchenko

18 September 2016 8	Dynamo Kyiv	0–1	Zorya Luhansk	Kyiv
19:30 EEST (UTC+03:00)		Report	Sobol (yellow card) 88'; Kulach (yellow card) 90+2'; Opanasenko 90+3'	Stadium: NSC Olimpiyskiy; Attendance: 11,024; Referee: Yuriy Vaks

24 September 2016 9	Zorya Luhansk	2–1	Vorskla Poltava	Zaporizhia
19:30 EEST (UTC+03:00)	Ljubenović 42'; Paulinho 83'	Report	Kravchenko (yellow card) 42'; Siminin (yellow card) 70'; Dytyatev 90+4'	Stadium: Slavutych-Arena; Attendance: 3,000; Referee: Kostyantyn Truhanov

2 October 2016 10	Shakhtar Donetsk	1–0	Zorya Luhansk	Zaporizhia
17:00 EEST (UTC+3)	Ordets (yellow card) 54'; Ferreyra 56', (yellow card) 65'; Rakitskiy (yellow card) 69'	Report	Sivakov (yellow card) 43'; Sukhotskyi (yellow card) 60'; Chaykovskyi (yellow card) 67'	Stadium: Slavutych-Arena; Attendance: 11,117; Referee: Mykola Balakin

15 October 2016 11	Zorya Luhansk	2–0	Volyn Lutsk	Zaporizhia
17:00 EEST (UTC+03:00)	Kulach 39'; Rafael Forster 42' (pen.)	Report	Roman Nykytyuk (yellow card) 19'; Chepelyuk (yellow card) 45'; Romanyuk (yellow card) 59'	Stadium: Slavutych-Arena; Attendance: 950; Referee: Yuriy Hryso

23 October 2016 12	Olimpik Donetsk	0–2	Zorya Luhansk	Sumy
17:00 EEST (UTC+03:00)	Baranovskyi (yellow card) 33' (yellow-red card) 64'; Petrov (yellow card) 57'	Report	Rafael Forster 37' (pen.), 64' (pen.)	Stadium: Yuvileiny Stadium; Attendance: 1,720; Referee: Serhiy Berezka

30 October 2016 13	Zorya Luhansk	2–1	Zirka Kropyvnytskyi	Zaporizhia
14:00 EET (UTC+02:00)	Petryak 15'; Kharatin (yellow card) 26'; Chaykovskyi (yellow card) 28'; Kulach 60'	Report	Kucherenko (yellow card) 25'; Artem Favorov (yellow card) 63'; Zahalskyi 90+1' (pen.)	Stadium: Slavutych-Arena; Attendance: 800; Referee: Anatoliy Abdula

6 November 2016 14	Chornomorets Odesa	0–0	Zorya Luhansk	Odesa
17:00 EET (UTC+02:00)	Filimonov (yellow card) 15'; Martynenko (yellow card) 22'; Danchenko (yellow card) 33'; Smirnov (yellow card) 40'	Report	Kamenyuka (yellow card) 26'; Kulach (yellow card) 68'; Tkachuk (yellow card) 90+1'	Stadium: Chornomorets Stadium; Attendance: 3,840; Referee: Yuriy Mozharovsky

19 November 2016 15	Zorya Luhansk	1–2	FC Oleksandriya	Zaporizhia
14:00 EET (UTC+02:00)	Hrechyshkin (yellow card) 27' (yellow-red card) 67'; Petryak 66'; Karavayev (yellow card) 78'; Rafael Forster (yellow card) 80'	Report	Ohirya (yellow card) 32' (yellow-red card) 77'; Kulish (yellow card) 69', (goal) 90+2'; Mykytsey 70'; Zaporozhan (yellow card) 78'	Stadium: Slavutych-Arena; Attendance: 900; Referee: Anatoliy Zhabchenko

27 November 2016 16	Karpaty Lviv	2–2	Zorya Luhansk	Lviv
17:00 EET (UTC+02:00)	Khudobyak 12'; Blanco Leschuk 29'; Markovych (yellow card) 83'	Report	Sukhotskyi 22'; Ljubenović (yellow card) 55', (goal) 90'; Chaykovskyi (yellow card) 55'	Stadium: Arena Lviv; Attendance: 1,923; Referee: Kostyantyn Trukhanov

3 December 2016 17	Zorya Luhansk	2–3	Dnipro	Zaporizhia
17:00 EET (UTC+02:00)	Yarmash (yellow card) 17'; Sobol (yellow card) 27'; Bezborodko 57'; Karavayev 61'; Ljubenović (yellow card) 80'	Report	Kocherhin 14', 78'; Luchkevych 23'; Svatok (yellow card) 29'; Rotan (yellow card) 36'	Stadium: Slavutych-Arena; Attendance: 1,000; Referee: Serhiy Boyko

11 December 2016 18	Stal Kamianske	0–2	Zorya Luhansk	Dnipro
19:30 EET (UTC+02:00)	Pashayev (yellow card) 7'	Report	Chaykovskyi (yellow card) 34'; Hrechyshkin (yellow card) 36'; Karavayev 74'; Bonaventure 76'	Stadium: Meteor Stadium; Attendance: 150; Referee: Yuriy Mozharovsky

25 February 2017 19	Zorya Luhansk	1–2	Dynamo Kyiv	Zaporizhia
14:00 EEST (UTC+03:00)	Bonaventure 4'; Opanasenko (yellow card) 50' (yellow-red card) 87'; Ljubenović (yellow card) 60'	Report	Harmash 14'; Vida (yellow card) 25'; Besyedin 30'	Stadium: Slavutych-Arena; Attendance: 3,800; Referee: Kostyantyn Trukhanov

4 March 2017 20	Vorskla Poltava	1–2	Zorya Luhansk	Poltava
17:00 EET (UTC+02:00)	Chyzhov (yellow card) 23'; Tkachuk (yellow card) 55'; Sharpar 73' (pen.)	Report	Hrechyshkin 24'; Kalitvintsev 45' (pen.); Chaykovskyi (yellow card) 56'	Stadium: Vorskla Stadium; Attendance: 2,532; Referee: Anatoliy Abdula

12 March 2017 21	Zorya Luhansk	1–2	Shakhtar Donetsk	Kharkiv
19:30 EET (UTC+02:00)	Kharatin (yellow card) 40', (goal) 60'; Chaykovskyi (yellow card) 44'	Report	Srna (yellow card) 22'; Bernard 26'; Kucher (yellow card) 78'; Malyshev 88'; Taison (yellow card) 90+2'	Stadium: Metalist OSC; Attendance: 8,209; Referee: Oleksandr Derdo

19 March 2017 22	Volyn Lutsk	0–1	Zorya Luhansk	Lutsk
14:00 EEST (UTC+03:00)	Shapoval (yellow card) 6'; Goropevšek (yellow card) 8'; Teterenko (yellow card) 45'; Roman Nykytyuk (yellow card) 90'	Report	Sobol (yellow card) 59'; Rafael Forster 90' (pen.)	Stadium: Avanhard Stadium; Attendance: 1,200; Referee: Anatoliy Zhabchenko

2 April 2017 23	Zorya Luhansk	1–2	Shakhtar Donetsk	Zaporizhia
19:30 EEST (UTC+03:00)	Sukhotskyi (yellow card) 16'; Bonaventure 31'; Checher (yellow card) 44'; Chaykovskyi (yellow card) 81'	Report	Ordets (yellow card) 13'; Blanco Leschuk 36'; Ismaily (yellow card) 54'; Rakitskiy (yellow card) 56' (yellow-red card) 87'; Taison 63'; Srna (yellow card) 70'; Malyshev (yellow card) 90+2'; Pyatov (yellow card) 90+4'	Stadium: Slavutych-Arena; Attendance: 9,500; Referee: Dmytro Kutakov

9 April 2017 24	FC Oleksandriya	0–0	Zorya Luhansk	Oleksandriya
14:00 EEST (UTC+03:00)	Siminin (yellow card) 60'; Hrytsuk (yellow card) 68'; Levanidov (yellow card) 69'	Report	Hordiyenko (yellow card) 36'; Pylyavskyi (yellow card) 68'; Rafael Forster (yellow card) 90+2'	Stadium: CSC Nika; Attendance: 2,089; Referee: Oleksandr Derdo

14 April 2017 25	Zorya Luhansk	0–1	Dynamo Kyiv	Zaporizhia
19:00 EEST (UTC+03:00)	Rafael Forster (yellow card) 60'	Report	Harmash 39'; Shepelyev (yellow card) 69'; Pantić (yellow card) 70'	Stadium: Slavutych-Arena; Attendance: 7,497; Referee: Anatoliy Zhabchenko

23 April 2017 26	Zorya Luhansk	1–2	Chornomorets Odesa	Zaporizhia
19:30 EEST (UTC+03:00)	Hrechyshkin (yellow card) 18'; Rafael Forster 51' (pen.)	Report	Korkishko 15', 57' (pen.), (yellow card) 90+1'; Andriyevskyi (yellow card) 80'	Stadium: Slavutych-Arena; Attendance: 1,200; Referee: Anatoliy Abdula

30 April 2017 27	Olimpik Donetsk	1–1	Zorya Luhansk	Kyiv
14:00 EEST (UTC+03:00)	Fedoriv (yellow card) 61'; Nyemchaninov 75'; Tsymbalyuk (yellow card) 81'	Report	Paulinho 17'; Hordiyenko (yellow card) 18' (yellow-red card) 90'; Hrechyshkin (yellow card) 49'; Pylyavskyi (yellow card) 80'	Stadium: Dynamo Stadium; Attendance: 1,138; Referee: Yevhen Aranovsky

6 May 2017 28	Shakhtar Donetsk	3–2	Zorya Luhansk	Kharkiv
17:00 EEST (UTC+03:00)	Ferreyra 38'; Ismaily 52'; Ordets 55'; Marlos (yellow card) 74'	Report	Opanasenko (yellow card) 37'; Kharatin (yellow card) 43', (goal) 80'; Babenko (yellow card) 86'; Bonaventure 88'; Pylyavskyi (yellow card) 90+3'	Stadium: Metalist OSC; Attendance: 13,157; Referee: Yuriy Mozharovsky

13 May 2017 29	Zorya Luhansk	1–0	FC Oleksandriya	Zaporizhia
17:00 EEST (UTC+03:00)	Rafael Forster 51' (pen.); Sobol (yellow card) 84'; Petryak (yellow card) 89'	Report	Kulish (yellow card) 10'; Banada (yellow card) 24'; Novak (red card) 40'; Myahkov (yellow card) 50'; Hitchenko (yellow card) 51'	Stadium: Slavutych-Arena; Attendance: 1,400; Referee: Dmytro Kutakov

21 May 2017 30	Dynamo Kyiv	1–2	Zorya Luhansk	Kyiv
19:30 EEST (UTC+03:00)	Ochigava (yellow card) 14'; Morozyuk 17'; Koval (yellow card) 58'	Report	Rafael Forster (yellow card) 17'; Checher 36'; Bonaventure 57'; Hrechyshkin (yellow card) 60'; Petryak (yellow card) 69'; Ljubenović (yellow card) 71'; Babenko (yellow card) 86'	Stadium: NSC Olimpiyskiy; Attendance: 8,193; Referee: Kateryna Monzul

26 May 2017 31	Chornomorets Odesa	0–1	Zorya Luhansk	Odesa
19:00 EEST (UTC+03:00)	Kovalets (yellow card) 27' (yellow-red card) 43'; Andriyevskyi (yellow card) 64'; Korkishko (yellow card) 66'; Tretyakov (yellow card) 84'	Report	Paulinho 1'; Kharatin (yellow card) 24'; Bonaventure (yellow card) 43'; Opanasenko (yellow card) 60'; Checher (yellow card) 62'	Stadium: Chornomorets Stadium; Attendance: 4,700; Referee: Yuriy Mozharovsky

31 May 2017 32	Zorya Luhansk	2–0	Olimpik Donetsk	Zaporizhia
19:00 EEST (UTC+03:00)	Sobol 27'; Petryak 80'; Paulinho (yellow card) 83'	[ Report]	Fedoriv (yellow card) 37'	Stadium: Slavutych-Arena; Attendance: 1,600; Referee: Mykola Balakin

=== Ukrainian Cup ===
26 October 2016 Round of 16 (1/8)	Dynamo Kyiv	5–2	Zorya Luhansk	Kyiv
19:00 EEST (UTC+03:00)	González 14', 97'; Khacheridi (yellow card) 59'; Ochigava (yellow card) 64'; Tsyhankov 65'; Antunes (yellow card) 84'; Moraes 100' (pen.), 119'	Report	Lipartia (yellow card) 5'; Rafael Forster 22' (pen.); Sobol (yellow card) 32'; Kharatin (yellow card) 45+2'; Dennis (yellow card) 56'; Sivakov (yellow card) 57', (goal) 89'; Hrechyshkin (yellow card) 85'	Stadium: NSC Olimpiyskiy; Attendance: 5,375; Referee: Anatoliy Zhabchenko

=== Europa League ===
==== Group stage ====
Pos	Team	Pld	W	D	L	GF	GA	GD	Pts	Qualification	FEN	MU	FEY	ZOR
1	(Turkey) Fenerbahçe	6	4	1	1	8	6	+2	13	Advance to knockout phase	—	2–1	1–0	2–0
2	(England) Manchester United	6	4	0	2	12	4	+8	12	Advance to knockout phase	4–1	—	4–0	1–0
3	(Netherlands) Feyenoord	6	2	1	3	3	7	−4	7		0–1	1–0	—	1–0
4	(Ukraine) Zorya Luhansk	6	0	2	4	2	8	−6	2		1–1	0–2	1–1	—

Source: UEFA
Rules for classification: Group stage tiebreakers

15 September 2016 1	Zorya Luhansk (Ukraine)	1–1	(Turkey) Fenerbahçe	Odesa
20:00 EEST (UTC+03:00)	Chaykovskyi (yellow card) 42'; Hrechyshkin 52'; Paulinho (yellow card) 90+5'	Report	Kjær 90+5'	Stadium: Chornomorets Stadium; Attendance: 16,000; Referee: István Kovács

29 September 2016 2	Manchester United (England)	1–0	(Ukraine) Zorya Luhansk	Manchester
22:00 EEST (UTC+03:00)	Bailly (yellow card) 63'; Ibrahimović 69'	Report	Kamenyuka (yellow card) 90'	Stadium: Old Trafford; Attendance: 58,179; Referee: Orel Grinfeld

20 October 2016 3	Feyenoord (Netherlands)	1–0	(Ukraine) Zorya Luhansk	Rotterdam
22:00 EEST (UTC+03:00)	Jørgensen 55'	Report	Lipartia (yellow card) 73'; Kamenyuka (yellow card) 86'	Stadium: De Kuip; Attendance: 35,000; Referee: Andris Treimanis

3 November 2016 4	Zorya Luhansk (Ukraine)	1–1	(Netherlands) Feyenoord	Odesa
	Rafael Forster 44'; Petryak (yellow card) 61'	Report	Jørgensen 15'; Vejinović (yellow card) 37'; Botteghin (yellow card) 42' (yellow-red card) 43'; Bilal Başaçıkoğlu (yellow card) 73'; Tapia (yellow card) 76'	Stadium: Chornomorets Stadium; Attendance: 16,855; Referee: Jakob Kehlet

24 November 2016 5	Fenerbahçe (Turkey)	2–0	(Ukraine) Zorya Luhansk	Istanbul
	Stoch 59'; Kjær 67'; Škrtel (yellow card) 90+1'	Report	Bonaventure (yellow card) 66'; Sobol (yellow card) 75' (yellow-red card) 90+2'	Stadium: Şükrü Saracoğlu Stadium; Attendance: 16,145; Referee: Harald Lechner

8 December 2016 6	Zorya Luhansk (Ukraine)	0–2	(England) Manchester United	Odesa
		Report	Mkhitaryan 48'; Ander Herrera (yellow card) 83'; Ibrahimović 88'; Bailly (yellow card) 90'	Stadium: Chornomorets Stadium; Referee: Tamás Bognar

== Statistics ==
=== Appearances and goals ===
No.	Pos	Nat	Player	Total		Premier League		Cup		Europa League	
No.	Pos	Nat	Player	Apps	Goals	Apps	Goals	Apps	Goals	Apps	Goals
Goalkeepers
1	GK	(Ukraine) UKR	Oleksiy Shevchenko	31	0	25	0	1	0	5	0
77	GK	(Ukraine) UKR	Oleh Chuvayev	1	0	1	0	0	0	0	0
91	GK	(Ukraine) UKR	Ihor Levchenko	7	0	6	0	0	0	1	0
Defenders
2	DF	(Ukraine) UKR	Artem Sukhotskyi	19	1	15+2	1	1	0	1	0
5	DF	(Ukraine) UKR	Artem Hordiyenko	24	2	18+2	2	0+1	0	1+2	0
12	DF	(Brazil) BRA	Rafael Forster	32	8	25	6	1	1	6	1
16	DF	(Ukraine) UKR	Hryhoriy Yarmash	2	0	1+1	0	0	0	0	0
23	DF	(Ukraine) UKR	Mykhaylo Shershen	1	0	1	0	0	0	0	0
39	DF	(Ukraine) UKR	Yevhen Opanasenko	26	1	18+3	1	1	0	2+2	0
44	DF	(Ukraine) UKR	Vyacheslav Checher	15	1	15	1	0	0	0	0
95	DF	(Ukraine) UKR	Eduard Sobol	27	1	14+7	1	1	0	5	0
99	DF	(Ukraine) UKR	Andriy Pylyavskyi	7	0	6+1	0	0	0	0	0
Midfielders
4	MF	(Ukraine) UKR	Ihor Chaykovskyi	23	1	18	1	0	0	5	0
6	MF	(Ukraine) UKR	Mykyta Kamenyuka	20	0	14+1	0	0	0	4+1	0
7	MF	(Ukraine) UKR	Ivan Petryak	34	5	24+4	5	0	0	6	0
8	MF	(Ukraine) UKR	Ihor Kharatin	24	2	15+4	2	1	0	3+1	0
10	MF	(Georgia (country)) GEO	Jaba Lipartia	31	0	17+10	0	1	0	1+2	0
15	MF	(Ukraine) UKR	Vladyslav Kalitvintsev	9	1	7+2	1	0	0	0	0
17	MF	(Armenia) ARM	Gegham Kadymyan	4	0	0+4	0	0	0	0	0
22	MF	(Serbia) SRB	Željko Ljubenović	33	3	13+14	3	0+1	0	4+1	0
24	MF	(Ukraine) UKR	Dmytro Hrechyshkin	31	2	21+3	1	1	0	5+1	1
36	MF	(Ukraine) UKR	Ruslan Babenko	4	0	1+3	0	0	0	0	0
Forwards
9	FW	(Ukraine) UKR	Vladyslav Kulach	19	2	6+8	2	0	0	4+1	0
11	FW	(Brazil) BRA	Paulinho	37	3	19+12	3	0+1	0	0+5	0
21	FW	(Ukraine) UKR	Denys Bezborodko	7	1	3+3	1	0	0	1	0
42	FW	(Nigeria) NGA	Emmanuel Bonaventure Dennis	26	6	19+3	6	1	0	1+2	0
Players transferred out during the season
3	MF	(Belarus) BLR	Mikhail Sivakow	20	1	13+1	0	1	1	5	0
17	FW	(Ukraine) UKR	Yaroslav Kvasov	2	0	0+2	0	0	0	0	0
20	MF	(Ukraine) UKR	Oleksandr Karavayev	24	6	16+1	6	1	0	6	0
27	DF	(Ukraine) UKR	Yevhen Tkachuk	2	1	1+1	1	0	0	0	0

Source: Competitions

Last updated: 31 May 2017

=== Goalscorers ===
Rank	No.	Pos	Nat	Name	Premier League	Cup	Europa League	Total
1	12	DF	(Brazil)	Rafael Forster	6	1	1	8
2	20	MF	(Ukraine)	Oleksandr Karavayev	6	0	0	6
2	44	FW	(Nigeria)	Emmanuel Bonaventure Dennis	6	0	0	6
4	7	MF	(Ukraine)	Ivan Petryak	5	0	0	5
5	11	FW	(Brazil)	Paulinho	3	0	0	3
5	22	MF	(Serbia)	Željko Ljubenović	3	0	0	3
7	5	DF	(Ukraine)	Artem Hordiyenko	2	0	0	2
7	8	MF	(Ukraine)	Ihor Kharatin	2	0	0	2
7	9	FW	(Ukraine)	Vladyslav Kulach	2	0	0	2
7	24	MF	(Ukraine)	Dmytro Hrechyshkin	1	0	1	2
11	2	DF	(Ukraine)	Artem Sukhotskyi	1	0	0	1
11	3	MF	(Belarus)	Mikhail Sivakow	0	1	0	1
11	4	MF	(Ukraine)	Ihor Chaykovskyi	1	0	0	1
11	15	MF	(Ukraine)	Vladyslav Kalitvintsev	1	0	0	1
11	21	FW	(Ukraine)	Denys Bezborodko	1	0	0	1
11	27	DF	(Ukraine)	Yevhen Tkachuk	1	0	0	1
11	39	DF	(Ukraine)	Yevhen Opanasenko	1	0	0	1
11	44	DF	(Ukraine)	Vyacheslav Checher	1	0	0	1
11	95	DF	(Ukraine)	Eduard Sobol	1	0	0	1

Last updated: 31 May 2017

=== Clean sheets ===
Rank	No.	Pos	Nat	Name	Premier League	Cup	Europa League	Total
1	1	GK	(Ukraine)	Oleksiy Shevchenko	10	0	0	10
2	91	GK	(Ukraine)	Ihor Levchenko	2	0	0	2
3	77	GK	(Ukraine)	Oleh Chuvayev	1	0	0	1

Last updated: 31 May 2017

=== Disciplinary record ===
No.	Pos	Nat	Player	Premier League			Cup			Europa League			Total		
No.	Pos	Nat	Player	Booked	(yellow card) (yellow-red card)	Sent off (straight red)	Booked	(yellow card) (yellow-red card)	Sent off (straight red)	Booked	(yellow card) (yellow-red card)	Sent off (straight red)	Booked	(yellow card) (yellow-red card)	Sent off (straight red)
1	GK	(Ukraine)	Oleksiy Shevchenko	1	0	0	0	0	0	0	0	0	1	0	0
2	DF	(Ukraine)	Artem Sukhotskyi	3	0	0	0	0	0	0	0	0	3	0	0
3	MF	(Belarus)	Mikhail Sivakow	3	0	0	1	0	0	0	0	0	4	0	0
4	MF	(Ukraine)	Ihor Chaykovskyi	8	0	0	0	0	0	1	0	0	9	0	0
5	DF	(Ukraine)	Artem Hordiyenko	1	1	0	0	0	0	0	0	0	1	1	0
6	MF	(Ukraine)	Mykyta Kamenyuka	2	0	0	0	0	0	2	0	0	4	0	0
7	MF	(Ukraine)	Ivan Petryak	3	0	0	0	0	0	1	0	0	4	0	0
8	MF	(Ukraine)	Ihor Kharatin	4	0	0	1	0	0	0	0	0	5	0	0
9	FW	(Ukraine)	Vladyslav Kulach	2	0	0	0	0	0	0	0	0	2	0	0
10	MF	(Georgia (country))	Jaba Lipartia	0	0	0	1	0	0	1	0	0	2	0	0
11	FW	(Brazil)	Paulinho	2	0	0	0	0	0	1	0	0	3	0	0
12	DF	(Brazil)	Rafael Forster	4	0	0	0	0	0	0	0	0	4	0	0
16	DF	(Ukraine)	Hryhoriy Yarmash	1	0	0	0	0	0	0	0	0	1	0	0
20	MF	(Ukraine)	Oleksandr Karavayev	1	0	0	0	0	0	0	0	0	1	0	0
22	MF	(Serbia)	Željko Ljubenović	5	0	0	0	0	0	0	0	0	5	0	0
24	MF	(Ukraine)	Dmytro Hrechyshkin	5	1	0	1	0	0	0	0	0	6	1	0
27	DF	(Ukraine)	Yevhen Tkachuk	2	0	0	0	0	0	0	0	0	2	0	0
36	MF	(Ukraine)	Ruslan Babenko	2	0	0	0	0	0	0	0	0	2	0	0
39	DF	(Ukraine)	Yevhen Opanasenko	2	1	0	0	0	0	0	0	0	2	1	0
42	FW	(Nigeria)	Emmanuel Bonaventure Dennis	2	0	0	1	0	0	1	0	0	4	0	0
44	DF	(Ukraine)	Vyacheslav Checher	4	0	0	0	0	0	0	0	0	4	0	0
95	DF	(Ukraine)	Eduard Sobol	4	0	0	1	0	0	0	1	0	5	1	0
99	DF	(Ukraine)	Andriy Pylyavskyi	3	0	0	0	0	0	0	0	0	3	0	0

Last updated: 31 May 2017
