= 2014–15 FC Zorya Luhansk season =

Ukrainian football club season

Zorya Luhansk are a Ukrainian football club which are based in Luhansk. During the 2014–15 campaign the club competed in the Ukrainian Premier League, UEFA Europa League, Ukrainian Cup. They were under the management of Yuriy Vernydub.

== Competitions ==
=== Premier League ===
==== League table ====
Pos	Team	Pld	W	D	L	GF	GA	GD	Pts	Qualification or relegation
2	Shakhtar Donetsk	26	17	5	4	71	21	+50	56	Qualification for the Champions League third qualifying round
3	Dnipro Dnipropetrovsk	26	16	6	4	47	17	+30	54	Qualification for the Europa League group stage (Note: Since winners of 2014–15 Ukrainian Cup, Dynamo Kyiv, qualified for the 2015–16 UEFA Champions League, the place in the Europa League group stage for the cup winner will be given to the third-placed team and the spots to Europa League third qualifying round will be given to the fourth-placed and fifth-placed teams.)
4	Zorya Luhansk (Note: Zorya Luhansk were initially deducted a total of 3 points on decision of the FFU Control Disciplinary Committee on 18 February 2015, but the decision was reversed and the FFU reinstated the three points to Zorya Luhansk. (17 June 2015))	26	13	6	7	40	31	+9	45	Qualification for the Europa League third qualifying round
5	Vorskla Poltava	26	11	9	6	35	22	+13	42	Qualification for the Europa League third qualifying round
6	Metalist Kharkiv	25	8	11	6	34	32	+2	35	

Source: uafootball.net.ua
Rules for classification: 1) points; 2) goal difference; 3) goals scored; 4) head-to-head points; 5) head-to-head goal difference; 6) head-to-head goals scored; 7) fair play rating

==== Matches ====
27 July 2014 Match 1	Zorya Luhansk	1 - 2	Metalist Kharkiv	Zaporizhzhia
21:00	Vernydub (yellow card) 45'; Chaykovskyi (yellow card) 51'; Yarmash (yellow card) 61'; Ljubenović 65'; Malinovskyi (yellow card) 80'	Summary	Edmar (yellow card) 24'; Kulakov 33'; Villagra 56'; Márcio Azevedo (yellow card) 87'	Stadium: Slavutych-Arena; Attendance: 2,573; Referee: (Ukraine) Dmitriy Kutakov

3 August 2014 Match 2	FC Olimpik Donetsk	1 - 0	Zorya Luhansk	Kyiv
17:00	Dytyatev (yellow card) 22'; Lebed (yellow card) 23'; Yeremenko (yellow card) 57'; Lysenko 88'	Summary	Ignjatijević (yellow card) 32' (yellow-red card); Pysko (yellow card) 45+1'; Vernydub (yellow card) 90+4'	Stadium: Stadion NTK im. B. M. Bannikova; Attendance: 900; Referee: (Ukraine) Vitaliy Romanov

11 August 2014 Match 3	Zorya Luhansk	1 - 0	Illichivets Mariupol	Zaporizhzhia
21:00	Budkivskyi 29'; Malinovskyi (yellow card) 79'; Shevchenko (yellow card) 90+1'	Summary	Dovhyi (yellow card) 90+2'	Stadium: Slavutych-Arena; Attendance: 1,000; Referee: (Ukraine) Olexander Derdo

16 August 2014 Match 4	Chornomorets Odesa	0 - 0	Zorya Luhansk	Odesa
19:30	Kovalchuk (yellow card) 73'	Summary	Maksym MalyshevMalyshev (yellow card) 28'; Malinovskyi (yellow card) 88'	Stadium: Chornomorets Stadium; Attendance: 13,200; Referee: (Ukraine) Yaroslav Kozyk

31 August 2014 Match 5	Zorya Luhansk	1 - 2	FC Volyn Lutsk	Zaporizhzhia
19:30	Pylyavskyi (yellow card) 65'; Karavayev 76'; Ignjatijević (yellow card) 78'	Summary	Bicfalvi 6'; Svatok (yellow card) 12'; Humenyuk (yellow card) 22'; Babenko (yellow card) 24'; Shish (yellow card) 35'; Memeshev 90+2'	Stadium: Slavutych-Arena; Attendance: 1,500; Referee: (Ukraine) Evgen Aranovskiy

13 September 2014 Match 6	Zorya Luhansk	2 - 2	Dynamo Kyiv	Zaporizhzhia
19:30	Khomchenovskyi 24'; Malyshev (yellow card) 36'; Yarmash (yellow card) 65'; Ljubenović 90+3'	Summary	Danilo Silva (yellow card) 58'; Teodorczyk 59'; Belhanda (yellow card) 70'; Kravets 88'	Stadium: Slavutych-Arena; Attendance: 4,100; Referee: (Ukraine) Anatoliy Abdula

21 September 2014 Match 7	Shakhtar Donetsk	0 - 1	Zorya Luhansk	Kyiv
17:00	Srna (yellow card) 36'; Ordets (yellow card) 89'	Summary	Malyshev (yellow card) 34' (goal) 42'; Budkivskyi (yellow card) 67'; Segbefia (yellow card) 90'	Stadium: Stadion NTK im. B. M. Bannikova; Attendance: 1,100; Referee: (Ukraine) Yuriy Moseychuk

4 October 2014 Match 8	Zorya Luhansk	2 - 1	Hoverla Uzhhorod	Zaporizhzhia
17:00	Ignjatijević (yellow card) 48'; Malyshev 58'; Ljubenović 76'	Summary	Shatskikh 26'; Jagodinskis (yellow card) 33' (yellow-red card); Kacharaba (yellow card) 68'	Stadium: Slavutych-Arena; Attendance: 1,500; Referee: (Ukraine) Olexander Derdo

19 October 2014 Match 9	Metalurh Donetsk	0 - 0	Zorya Luhansk	Kyiv
19:30	Sobol (yellow card) 7'; Putivtsev (yellow card) 19'; Noyok (yellow card) 61'; Nasonov (yellow card) 89'	Summary	Malinovskyi (yellow card) 28'; Khomchenovskyi (yellow card) 61'; Bilyi (yellow card) 63'	Stadium: Obolon Arena; Attendance: 1,000; Referee: (Ukraine) Sergiy Berezka

27 October 2014 Match 10	Zorya Luhansk	-	FC Dnipro Dnipropetrovsk	Luhansk
17:00				Stadium: Avanhard Stadium

2 November 2014 Match 11	Karpaty Lviv	1 - 2	Zorya Luhansk	Lviv
17:00	Serhiychuk 31'; Plastun (yellow card) 45+2'	Summary	Vernydub 13'; Budkivskyi (yellow card) 47'; Ignjatijević (yellow card) 79'; Khomchenovskyi 84'; Pylyavskyi (yellow card) 87'; Bilyi (yellow card) 87'	Stadium: Ukraina Stadium; Attendance: 4,400; Referee: (Ukraine) Yaroslav Kozyk

8 November 2014 Match 12	Zorya Luhansk	3-0	Metalurh Zaporizhzhia	Zaporizhzhia
16:00 CET	Vernydub 15'; Hrytsay (yellow card) 40'; Budkivskyi 54' 84'	Summary	Yusov (yellow card) 29'; Balić (yellow card) 39' (yellow-red card); Shturko (yellow card) 41'; Sakhnevych (yellow card) 76'	Stadium: Slavutych-Arena; Attendance: 1,800; Referee: (Ukraine) Vitaliy Romanov

23 November 2014 Match 13	Vorskla	2-0	Zorya Luhansk	Poltava
16:00 CET	Chesnakov (yellow card) 19' kovpak (yellow card) 21' (goal) 76'; Hordiyenko 43' (o.g.); Januzi (yellow card) 90+1'	Summary	Hordiyenko (yellow card) 55'; Lipartia (yellow card) 74'; Budkivskyi (yellow card) 80'; Hrytsay (yellow card) 80'	Stadium: Oleksiy Butovskyi Vorskla Stadium; Attendance: 1,000; Referee: (Ukraine) Dmytro Kutakov

30 November 2014 Match 14	Metalist Kharkiv	4-2	Zorya Luhansk	Kharkiv
16:00 CET	Jajá 40' (pen.) 49' 90+2'; Bolbat 67'; Pshenychnykh (yellow card) 74'; Torres (yellow card) 82'; Kobin (yellow card) 90+1'	Summary	Yarmash (yellow card) 25'; Pylyavskyi 37' (yellow card) 70'; Kamenyuka (yellow card) 39'; Segbefia (yellow card) 43'; Vernydub (red card) 72'; Vernydub (yellow card) 79'; Petryak 84'	Stadium: Metalist Oblast Sports Complex; Attendance: 2,811; Referee: (Ukraine) Anatoliy Zhabchenko

6 December 2014 Match 10	Zorya Luhansk	2-1	FC Dnipro Dnipropetrovsk	Zaporizhzhia
16:00 CET	Hrytsay (yellow card) 38'; Budkivskyi 51'; Segbefia (yellow card) 62' (goal) 87'; Vernydub (yellow card) 77'	Summary	Rotan (yellow card) 50'; Kalinić (yellow card) 68'; Konoplyanka 90'	Stadium: Slavutych-Arena; Attendance: 1,200; Referee: (Ukraine) Victor Shvetsov

28 February 2014 Match 15	Zorya Luhansk	5-1	FC Olimpik Donetsk	Zaporizhzhia
14:00 EET	Malyshev 7'; Drachenko 13' (o.g.); Malinovskyi 31' (pen.) (yellow card) 64'; Kamenyuka 58' (yellow card) 58'; Opanasenko (yellow card) 63'; Pylyavskyi 68'	Summary	Tyschenko (yellow card) 30'; Doroshenko (yellow card) 49'; Kadmyan 70'	Stadium: Slavutych-Arena; Attendance: 500; Referee: (Ukraine) Anatoliy Abdula

7 March 2015 Match 16	Illichivets Mariupol	2-1	Zorya Luhansk	Dnipropetrovsk
14:00 EET	Matviyiv (yellow card) 8'; Zubkov 12'; Yavorskyi (yellow card) 50'; Vakulenko (yellow card) 57'; Hryn 90+4'	Summary	Lipartia 26'; Vernydub (yellow card) 66'; Totovytskyi (yellow card) 84'	Stadium: Meteor Stadium; Attendance: 200; Referee: (Ukraine) Vitaliy Romanov

15 March 2015 Match 17	Zorya Luhansk	1-0	Chornomorets Odesa	Zaporizhzhia
14:00 EET	Opanasenko (yellow card) 69'; Lipartia 77'	Summary	Martynenko (yellow card) 38'; Kabayev (yellow card) 44'; Hrechyshkin (yellow card) 87'; Kicha (yellow card) 90+1'	Stadium: Slavutych-Arena; Attendance: 700; Referee: (Ukraine) Kostyantin Trukhanov

5 April 2015 Match 18	FC Volyn Lutsk	1-2	Zorya Luhansk	Lutsk
14:00 EET	Matei (yellow card) 5'; Sharpar 32' (yellow card) 61'; Polyivyi (yellow card) 90+3'	Summary	Malinovskyi (yellow card) 10'; Khomchenovskyi 49'; Budkivskyi 51'; Hordiyenko (yellow card) 60'	Stadium: Avanhard Stadium; Attendance: 2,000; Referee: (Ukraine) Anatoliy Abdula

12 April 2015 Match 19	Dynamo Kyiv	2-2	Zorya Luhansk	Kyiv
17:00 EET	Kravets 4'; Rybalka 35'; Antunes (yellow card) 90+1'	Summary	Pylyavskyi 9' (pen.); Ljubenović 68'	Stadium: NSC Olimpiyskiy; Attendance: 7,200; Referee: (Ukraine) Yaroslav Kozyk

18 April 2015 Match 20	Zorya Luhansk	1-4	Shakhtar Donetsk	Zaporizhzhia
19:30 EET	Ljubenović 2' (pen.)	Summary	Kryvtsov 45+1'; Alex Teixeira 68' 87'; Luiz Adriano 71' (pen.)	Stadium: Slavutych-Arena; Attendance: 2,500; Referee: (Ukraine) Yury Vaks

25 April 2015 Match 21	Hoverla Uzhhorod	1-2	Zorya Luhansk	Uzhhorod
14:00 EET	Myakushko 42'; Jagodinskis (yellow card) 57'; Khomyn (yellow card) 79'; Herasymyuk (yellow card) 82'; Koval (yellow card) 85'; Raičević (yellow card) 90+3'	Summary	Ljubenović 84'; Lipartia 90'	Stadium: Avanhard Stadium; Attendance: 1,530; Referee: (Ukraine) Oleksandr Ivanov

2 May 2015 Match 22	Zorya Luhansk	4-2	Metalurh Donetsk	Zaporizhzhia
17:00 EET	Budkivskyi 6'; Hordiyenko (yellow card) 32'; Karavayev 36' (yellow card) 42'; Bilyi 47'; Totovytskyi 68'; Chaykovskyi (yellow card) 82'	Summary	Sobol (yellow card) 20'; Baranovskyi (yellow card) 34'; Pryima (yellow card) 37'; Postupalenko (yellow card) 46'; Júnior Moraes 54' (pen.); Lazić 77'; Morozyuk (yellow card) 80'; Checher (yellow card) 82'	Stadium: Slavutych-Arena; Attendance: 1,000; Referee: (Ukraine) Anatolii Zhabchenko

10 May 2015 Match 23	FC Dnipro Dnipropetrovsk	0-2	Zorya Luhansk	Dnipropetrovsk
19:30 EET	Bruno Gama (yellow card) 9'	Summary	Khomchenovskyi 27'; Chaykovskyi (yellow card) 37'; Budkivskyi 43'; Malinovskyi (yellow card) 62'	Stadium: Dnipro-Arena; Attendance: 11,507; Referee: (Ukraine) Anatoliy Abdula

16 May 2015 Match 24	Zorya Luhansk	1-1	Karpaty Lviv	Zaporizhzhia
19:30 EET	Ljubenović 34'	Summary	Miroshnichenko (yellow card) 16'; Serhiychuk (yellow card) 19'; Plastun 36'; Daushvili (yellow card) 40'; Hitchenko (yellow card) 51'; Kostevych (yellow card) 65'; Kravets (yellow card) 88'	Stadium: Slavutych-Arena; Attendance: 1,100; Referee: (Ukraine) Sergiy Berezka

24 May 2015 Match 25	Metalurh Zaporizhzhia	0-1	Zorya Luhansk	Zaporizhzhia
19:30 EET	Kulach (yellow card) 34'; Gvilia (yellow card) 85'	Summary	Chaykovskyi (yellow card) 33'; Ljubenović 49'; Malinovskyi (yellow card) 67'; Malyshev (yellow card) 82'	Stadium: Slavutych-Arena; Attendance: 3,500; Referee: (Ukraine) Ivan Bondar

29 May 2015 Match 26	Zorya Luhansk	-	Vorskla Poltava	Zaporizhzhia
19:00 EET				Stadium: Slavutych-Arena

=== Ukrainian Cup ===
24 August 2014 Last 32	Kremin Kremenchuk	0 - 2	Zorya Luhansk	Kremenchuk
17:00		Summary	Kvashuk (yellow card) 35'; Boroday 41'; Lipartia 47'; Chaykovskyi (yellow card) 61'	Stadium: Kremin Stadium; Attendance: 1,700; Referee: (Ukraine) Dmitriy Zhukov

26 September 2014 Last 16 First Leg	FC Oleksandriya	0 - 1	Zorya Luhansk	Oleksandriia, Kirovohrad Oblast
18:30	Andriy Zaporozhan (yellow card) 38'; Mykytsey (yellow card) 68'; Oleksandr Guskov (yellow card) 89'	Summary	Malinovskyi (yellow card) 45+2'; Malyshev 56'; Vernydub (yellow card) 64'; Ljubenović (yellow card) 65'; Karavayev (yellow card) 66'; Budkivskyi (yellow card) 83'	Stadium: CSC Nika Stadium; Attendance: 5,200; Referee: (Ukraine) Viktor Shevtsov

29 October 2014 Last 16 Second Leg	Zorya Luhansk	1 - 1 (2-1 agg.)	FC Oleksandriya	Zaporizhzhia
17:00	Segbefia 15'; Ignjatijević (yellow card) 42'	Summary	Andriy Novak (yellow card) 18'; Imerekov (yellow card) 39' (goal) 45'	Stadium: Slavutych-Arena; Attendance: 500; Referee: (Ukraine) Oleksandr Bilokur

=== Uefa Europa League ===
17 July 2014 Q2 Leg 1	(Albania) Laçi	0 - 3	(Ukraine) Zorya Luhansk	Laç
17:00		Summary	Sheta 23' (o.g.); Vernydub (yellow card) 40'; Ljubenović 47'; Boli 75'; Boroday (yellow card) 88'	Stadium: Laçi Stadium; Attendance: 1,200; Referee: (Slovenia) Petár Kralovic

24 July 2014 Q2 Leg 2	(Ukraine) Zorya Luhansk	2 - 1 (5 - 1 agg.)	(Albania) Laçi	Kyiv
20:30	Lipartia (yellow card) 37'; Vernydub (yellow card) 45+1'; Ignjatijević 74'; Yarmash (yellow card) 83'; Budkivskyi 87'	Summary	Teqja (yellow card) 51'; Nimani 85'	Stadium: Obolon Arena; Referee: (Greece) Stavros Tritsonis

31 July 2014 Q3 Leg 1	(Ukraine) Zorya Luhansk	1 - 1	(Norway) Molde	Kyiv
20:30	Khudzik (yellow card) 15'; Kamenyuka 62'	Summary	Toivio (yellow card) 23'; Chima (yellow card) 31'; Hestad (yellow card) 85'; Svendsen 89'	Stadium: Valeriy Lobanovskyi Dynamo Stadium; Referee: (Austria) Harald Lechner

7 August 2014 Q3 Leg 2	(Norway) Molde	1 - 2 (2 - 3 agg.)	(Ukraine) Zorya Luhansk	Molde
18:00	Gulbrandsen 43'	Report	Kamenyuka 2'; Ignjatijević (yellow card) 38'; Malinovskyi (yellow card) 46'; Hrytsay (yellow card) 59'; Bilyi (yellow card) 87'; Lipartia (yellow card) 87'; Forren 89' (o.g.)	Stadium: Aker Stadion; Attendance: 4,438; Referee: (Scotland) Steven McLean

21 August 2014 PO Leg 1	(Ukraine) Zorya Luhansk	1 - 1	(Netherlands) Feyenoord	Kyiv
20:45	Chaykovskyi (yellow card) 21'; Bilyi 27'; Budkivskyi (yellow card) 86'	Summary	Boëtius (yellow card) 29' te Vrede 38'; Kongolo (yellow card) 55'	Stadium: Valeriy Lobanovskyi Dynamo Stadium; Referee: (Poland) Pawel Gil

28 August 2014 PO Leg 2	(Netherlands) Feyenoord	4 - 3 (5 - 4 agg.)	(Ukraine) Zorya Luhansk	Rotterdam
20:00	te Vrede 18' (yellow card) 87'; Schaken 26'; Bilyi 48' (o.g.); Başaçıkoğlu (yellow card) 55'; Manu 90+2' (yellow card) 90+3'	Summary	Malinovskyi 56' 80'; Bilyi 71'	Stadium: De Kuip; Attendance: 32,500; Referee: (Denmark) Kenn Hansen
