= 2016 Ukrainian Cup final =

- Event: 2015–16 Ukrainian Cup
| Zorya Luhansk | Shakhtar Donetsk |
| 0 | 2 |
- Date: 21 May 2016
- Venue: Arena Lviv, Lviv
- Referee: Yevhen Aranovsky
- Attendance: 21,720
- Weather: +20°, Light rain

The 2016 Ukrainian Cup final was a football match that was played on 21 May 2016 in Lviv. For the first time the cup final was held in Lviv. The match was the 25th Ukrainian Cup Final and was contested by Zorya Luhansk and Shakhtar Donetsk.

== Road to Lviv ==
All fourteen Ukrainian Premier League clubs do not have to go through qualification to get into the competition (Ukrainian Cup), so Zorya and Shakhtar both qualified for the competition automatically.

Zorya Luhansk

| Round 1 | Krystal Kherson | 0 – 5 | Zorya Luhansk |
| Round 2 (1st leg) | Helios Kharkiv | 0 – 2 | Zorya Luhansk |
| Round 2 (2nd leg) | Zorya Luhansk | 3 – 1 | Helios Kharkiv |
| | (Zorya won 5–1 on aggregate) | | |
| Quarter-final (1st leg) | Volyn Lutsk | 1 – 1 | Zorya Luhansk |
| Quarter-final (2nd leg) | Zorya Luhansk | 5 – 0 | Volyn Lutsk |
| | (Zorya won 6–1 on aggregate) | | |
| Semi-final (1st leg) | Dnipro Dnipropetrovsk | 1 – 0 | Zorya Luhansk |
| Semi-final (2nd leg) | Zorya Luhansk | 2 – 0 | Dnipro Dnipropetrovsk |
| | (Zorya won 2–1 on aggregate) | | |

Shakhtar Donetsk

| Round 1 | Arsenal-Kyiv | 0 – 3 | Shakhtar Donetsk |
| Round 2 (1st leg) | FC Ternopil | 0 – 5 | Shakhtar Donetsk |
| Round 2 (2nd leg) | Shakhtar Donetsk | 4 – 0 | FC Ternopil |
| | (Shakhtar won 9–0 on aggregate) | | |
| Quarter-final (1st leg) | Vorskla Poltava | 0 – 4 | Shakhtar Donetsk |
| Quarter-final (2nd leg) | Shakhtar Donetsk | 1 – 2 | Vorskla Poltava |
| | (Shakhtar won 5–2 on aggregate) | | |
| Semi-final (1st leg) | FC Oleksandriya | 1 – 1 | Shakhtar Donetsk |
| Semi-final (2nd leg) | Shakhtar Donetsk | 2 – 0 | FC Oleksandriya |
| | (Shakhtar won 3–1 on aggregate) | | |

== Previous encounters ==
This was not only the first Ukrainian Cup Final between the two teams, but also the first time they meet in this competition. Previously Zorya and Shakhtar met in the Soviet Cup in total of six game (the record was two wins for Zorya and four wins for Shakhtar with Zorya scoring six goals and Shakhtar scoring seven).

It was first Cup Final appearance for Zorya, while their opponents Shakhtar had appeared in 15 Cup Finals winning nine.

== Match ==
=== Details ===
21 May 2016
17:00

| Zorya Luhansk | 0–2 | Shakhtar Donetsk |
|---|---|---|
| | Report | Hladkyy 42', 57' |

Arena Lviv, Lviv
Attendance: 21,720
Referee: Yevhen Aranovskyi

| Zorya Luhansk | Shakhtar Donetsk |

Zorya Luhansk:
| GK | 30 | (Ukraine) Mykyta Shevchenko |
| RB | 39 | (Ukraine) Yevhen Opanasenko | (substituted off) 64' |
| CB | 3 | (Belarus) Mikhail Sivakow | (yellow card) 64' |
| CB | 12 | (Brazil) Rafael Forster | (yellow card) 12' |
| LB | 6 | (Ukraine) Mykyta Kamenyuka (c) |
| DM | 4 | (Ukraine) Ihor Chaykovskyi | (yellow card) 64' |
| DM | 5 | (Ukraine) Artem Hordiyenko | (substituted off) 57' |
| RW | 20 | (Ukraine) Oleksandr Karavayev |
| CM | 22 | (Serbia) Željko Ljubenović |
| LW | 34 | (Ukraine) Ivan Petryak | (substituted off) 46' |
| CF | 28 | (Ukraine) Pylyp Budkivskyi |
Substitutes:
| GK | 91 | (Ukraine) Ihor Levchenko |
| DF | 2 | (Ukraine) Artem Sukhotskyi |
| FW | 10 | (Georgia (country)) Jaba Lipartia | (substituted in) 57' |
| FW | 11 | (Brazil) Paulinho |
| DF | 16 | (Ukraine) Hryhoriy Yarmash | (substituted in) 64' (yellow card) 70' |
| MF | 24 | (Ukraine) Dmytro Hrechyshkin |
| MF | 29 | (Ukraine) Andriy Totovytskyi | (substituted in) 46' |
Manager:
(Ukraine) Yuriy Vernydub

Shakhtar Donetsk:
| GK | 32 | (Ukraine) Anton Kanibolotskiy |
| RB | 33 | (Croatia) Darijo Srna (c) |
| CB | 5 | (Ukraine) Oleksandr Kucher |
| CB | 44 | (Ukraine) Yaroslav Rakitskiy |
| LB | 31 | (Brazil) Ismaily |
| DM | 6 | (Ukraine) Taras Stepanenko |
| DM | 17 | (Ukraine) Maksym Malyshev |
| RW | 11 | (Brazil) Marlos |
| AM | 74 | (Ukraine) Viktor Kovalenko | (substituted off) 59' |
| LW | 28 | (Brazil) Taison | (substituted off) 81' |
| CF | 21 | (Ukraine) Oleksandr Hladkyy | (substituted off) 74' |
Substitutes:
| GK | 30 | (Ukraine) Andriy Pyatov |
| DF | 18 | (Ukraine) Ivan Ordets |
| DF | 38 | (Ukraine) Serhiy Kryvtsov |
| MF | 7 | (Brazil) Wellington Nem | (substituted in) 74' |
| MF | 58 | (Ukraine) Andriy Korobenko |
| FW | 22 | (Croatia) Eduardo da Silva | (substituted in) 59' |
| FW | 19 | (Argentina) Facundo Ferreyra | (substituted in) 81' |
Manager:
(Romania) Mircea Lucescu

MAN OF THE MATCH

MATCH OFFICIALS

- Assistant referees:
  - Serhiy Bekker (Kharkiv)
  - Natalya Rachynska (Kyiv)
- Fourth official:
  - Kostiantyn Trukhanov

MATCH RULES

- 90 minutes.
- 30 minutes of extra-time if necessary.
- Penalty shoot-out if scores still level.
- Seven named substitutes.
- Maximum of 3 substitutions.

== See also ==
- 2015–16 Ukrainian Premier League
