= Ruslan Malinovskyi =

Ukrainian footballer (born 1993)

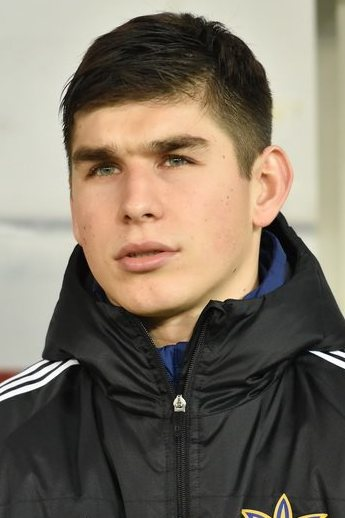
- Malinovskyi with Ukraine in 2015

Personal information
- Full name: Ruslan Volodymyrovych Malinovskyi
- Date of birth: 4 May 1993 (age 33)
- Place of birth: Zhytomyr, Ukraine
- Height: 1.81 m (5 ft 11 in)
- Positions: Attacking midfielder; right winger; second striker

Team information
- Current team: Trabzonspor
- Number: 17

Youth career
- 2000–2005: Polissya Zhytomyr
- 2006–2010: Shakhtar Donetsk

Senior career*
Years	Team	Apps	(Gls)
2011–2017	Shakhtar Donetsk	0	(0)
2011–2012	Shakhtar-3 Donetsk	39	(10)
2012–2013	→ Sevastopol (loan)	16	(1)
2013	→ Sevastopol-2 (loan)	2	(1)
2014–2015	→ Zorya Luhansk (loan)	44	(7)
2015–2017	→ Genk (loan)	33	(5)
2017–2019	Genk	74	(18)
2019–2023	Atalanta	115	(23)
2023	→ Marseille (loan)	20	(1)
2023–2024	Marseille	0	(0)
2023–2024	→ Genoa (loan)	19	(2)
2024–2026	Genoa	52	(8)
2026–	Trabzonspor	2	(0)

International career^{‡}
2011–2012	Ukraine U19	6	(1)
2013–2014	Ukraine U21	19	(2)
2015–	Ukraine	71	(10)
- * Club domestic league appearances and goals as of 23:41, 23 August 2026 (UTC) ‡ National team caps and goals as of 7 June 2026

Ruslan Volodymyrovych Malinovskyi (Ukrainian: Русла́н Володи́мирович Маліно́вський; born 4 May 1993) is a Ukrainian professional footballer who plays as an attacking midfielder for Süper Lig club Trabzonspor and the Ukraine national team. He is known for being a set piece specialist and possesses a powerful and accurate shot with either foot.

== Club career ==
=== Early career ===
Malinovskyi began his career at local side Polissya Zhytomyr under the management of Serhiy Zavalko. On 1 September 2012, he played on loan for Sevastopol, signing a one-and-a-half-year contract.

=== Genk ===
On 1 January 2016, Malinovskyi was on loan to Belgian side Genk until the end of the season. He debuted for the club in the Belgian Cup semi-final against Standard Liège and spent 72 minutes on the field. Altogether, during the loan at the Belgian club, Malinovskyi played 41 games in all tournaments, in which he scored 13 goals and made eight assists. On 29 May 2017, it was announced that Genk signed Malinovskyi permanently on a four-year contract.

=== Atalanta ===
On 16 July 2019, Malinovskyi signed for Atalanta for €13.7 million. On 22 October 2019, he scored his first goal for Atalanta in the UEFA Champions League game against Manchester City. Malinovskyi was named Player of the Month by Atalanta supporters. He scored his first Serie A goal on 7 December 2019 in a match against Hellas Verona.

On 24 June 2020, Malinovskyi scored the equalizing goal in a 3–2 comeback win against Lazio. On 18 April 2021, he scored the winning goal in a 1–0 win over Juventus;

On 19 May 2021, he scored in the final of the Coppa Italia against the same opponents but Atalanta fell to a 1–2 defeat. On 24 February 2022, after having scored a goal against Olympiacos, he showed a T-shirt with the text "No War in Ukraine" after the Russian invasion of Ukraine.

=== Marseille ===
On 9 January 2023, Malinovskyi joined Ligue 1 side Marseille on loan until the end of the season, with an option for the French club to purchase the player. Following a total amount of 23 appearances and two goals for Les Olympiens (split between the league and the national cup), he signed permanently for Marseille at the end of the 2022–23 season.

Loan to Genoa and permanent move

On 19 August 2023, Malinovskyi officially joined newly promoted Serie A club Genoa on a season-long loan, with a €10 million-worth option to buy in favor of the Italian club. On 27 August, he made his debut with the team in a league match against Lazio. He scored his debut goal for the club on 26 November, in a match against Frosinone. Genoa signed him permanently on 31 January 2024.

== International career ==
On 31 March 2015, Malinovskyi debuted for the Ukrainian senior squad in a friendly match against Latvia, coming on as a substitute to Roman Bezus in the 85th minute.

On 10 October 2018, he scored his first goal for the national team in a 1–1 friendly draw against Italy, equalizing the score in the 62nd minute of the match.

Malinovskyi was a member of Ukraine's squad for UEFA Euro 2020 and played four of the team's five matches as they reached the quarter-finals.

In May 2024, Malinovskyi was called up to represent Ukraine at UEFA Euro 2024.

== Career statistics ==
=== Club ===
As of match played 27 August 2026

Appearances and goals by club, season and competition
Club	Season	League			National cup (Note: Includes Ukrainian Cup, Belgian Cup, Coppa Italia, Coupe de France)		Europe		Total	
Club	Season	Division	Apps	Goals	Apps	Goals	Apps	Goals	Apps	Goals
Shakhtar-3 Donetsk	2010–11	Ukrainian Second League	8	1	—		—		8	1
Shakhtar-3 Donetsk	2011–12	Ukrainian Second League	25	4	—		—		25	4
Shakhtar-3 Donetsk	2012–13	Ukrainian Second League	6	5	—		—		6	5
Shakhtar-3 Donetsk	Total		39	10	—		—		39	10
Sevastopol-2 (loan)	2012–13	Ukrainian Second League	2	1	—		—		2	1
Sevastopol (loan)	2012–13	Ukrainian First League	16	1	2	0	—		18	1
Sevastopol (loan)	2013–14	Ukrainian Premier League	0	0	1	0	—		1	0
Sevastopol (loan)	Total		16	1	3	0	—		19	1
Zorya Luhansk (loan)	2013–14	Ukrainian Premier League	8	3	—		—		8	3
Zorya Luhansk (loan)	2014–15	Ukrainian Premier League	23	1	5	0	4 (Note: Appearances in UEFA Europa League)	2	32	3
Zorya Luhansk (loan)	2015–16	Ukrainian Premier League	13	3	3	0	4	4	20	7
Zorya Luhansk (loan)	Total		44	7	8	0	8	6	60	13
Genk	2015–16	Belgian Pro League	13	0	2	0	—		15	0
Genk	2016–17	Belgian Pro League	20	5	2	1	5	1	27	7
Genk	2017–18	Belgian Pro League	37	5	5	2	—		42	7
Genk	2018–19	Belgian Pro League	37	13	1	0	13	3	51	16
Genk	Total		107	23	10	3	18	4	135	30
Atalanta	2019–20	Serie A	34	8	1	0	9 (Note: Appearances in UEFA Champions League)	1	44	9
Atalanta	2020–21	Serie A	36	8	3	2	4	0	43	10
Atalanta	2021–22	Serie A	30	6	1	0	10 (Note: Five appearances and one goal in UEFA Champions League, five appearances and three goals in UEFA Europa League)	4	41	10
Atalanta	2022–23	Serie A	15	1	0	0	—		15	1
Atalanta	Total		115	23	5	2	23	5	143	30
Marseille (loan)	2022–23	Ligue 1	20	1	3	1	—		23	2
Genoa	2023–24 (Note: Part of this season was spent on loan from Marseille)	Serie A	28	4	2	0	—		30	4
Genoa	2024–25	Serie A	9	0	1	0	—		10	0
Genoa	2025–26	Serie A	34	6	1	0	—		35	6
Genoa	Total		71	10	4	0	—		75	10
Trabzonspor	2026–27	Süper Lig	2	0	0	0	2	0	4	0
Career total			416	76	33	6	51	15	498	97

=== International ===
As of match played 7 June 2026

Appearances and goals by national team and year
National team	Year	Apps	Goals
Ukraine	2015	3	0
Ukraine	2016	0	0
Ukraine	2017	5	0
Ukraine	2018	10	2
Ukraine	2019	9	3
Ukraine	2020	5	1
Ukraine	2021	13	0
Ukraine	2022	6	1
Ukraine	2023	6	0
Ukraine	2024	9	0
Ukraine	2025	3	3
Ukraine	2026	2	0
Total		71	10

As of match played 13 October 2025. Ukraine score listed first, score column indicates score after each Malinovskyi goal.

List of international goals scored by Ruslan Malinovskyi
No.	Date	Venue	Cap	Opponent	Score	Result	Competition
1	10 October 2018	Stadio Luigi Ferraris, Genoa, Italy	15	Italy	1–1	1–1	Friendly
2	16 October 2018	Metalist Stadium, Kharkiv, Ukraine	16	Czech Republic	1–0	1–0	2018–19 UEFA Nations League B
3	7 September 2019	LFF Stadium, Vilnius, Lithuania	23	Lithuania	3–0	3–0	UEFA Euro 2020 qualification
4	11 October 2019	Metalist Stadium, Kharkiv, Ukraine	25	Lithuania	1–0	2–0	UEFA Euro 2020 qualification
5	11 October 2019	Metalist Stadium, Kharkiv, Ukraine	25	Lithuania	2–0	2–0	UEFA Euro 2020 qualification
6	10 October 2020	Olympic Stadium, Kyiv, Ukraine	31	Germany	1–2	1–2	2020–21 UEFA Nations League A
7	11 June 2022	Stadion Miejski ŁKS, Łódź, Poland	48	Armenia	1–0	3–0	2022–23 UEFA Nations League B
8	10 October 2025	Laugardalsvöllur, Reykjavík, Iceland	67	Iceland	1–0	5–3	2026 FIFA World Cup qualification
9	10 October 2025	Laugardalsvöllur, Reykjavík, Iceland	67	Iceland	3–1	5–3	2026 FIFA World Cup qualification
10	13 October 2025	Józef Piłsudski Cracovia Stadium, Kraków, Poland	68	Azerbaijan	2–1	2–1	2026 FIFA World Cup qualification

== Honours ==
Sevastopol

- Ukrainian First League: 2012–13

Genk

- Belgian Pro League: 2018–19

Atalanta

- Coppa Italia runner-up: 2020–21

Ukraine U21

- Commonwealth of Independent States Cup: 2014

Individual

- Golden talent of Ukraine: 2014 (U21)
- Ukrainian Premier League Young Player of the Year: 2013–14
- Genk Player of the Season: 2018–19
- Serie A Player of the Month: May 2021, February 2022
- Serie A Goal of the Month: February 2022, January 2026
- Serie A top assist provider: 2020–21
