= Ihor Kharatin =

Ukrainian footballer (born 1995)

Personal information
- Full name: Ihor Ihorovych Kharatin
- Date of birth: 2 February 1995 (age 31)
- Place of birth: Mukachevo, Ukraine
- Height: 1.88 m (6 ft 2 in)
- Position: Defensive midfielder

Team information
- Current team: Veres Rivne
- Number: 14

Youth career
- 2002–2004: Mukacheve
- 2004–2012: Dynamo Kyiv

Senior career*
Years	Team	Apps	(Gls)
2012–2016	Dynamo Kyiv	1	(0)
2016	→ Metalist Kharkiv (loan)	8	(0)
2016–2018	Zorya Luhansk	64	(7)
2019–2021	Ferencváros	71	(7)
2021–2024	Legia Warsaw	20	(1)
2022–2024	Legia Warsaw II	10	(0)
2024	DAC Dunajská Streda	7	(0)
2024–2025	Kolos Kovalivka	3	(0)
2024–2025	→ Kolos-2 Kovalivka	7	(2)
2025–	Veres Rivne	40	(6)

International career
2010–2011	Ukraine U16	12	(0)
2011–2012	Ukraine U17	18	(2)
2012	Ukraine U18	5	(0)
2013–2014	Ukraine U19	9	(1)
2014–2015	Ukraine U20	9	(1)
2016	Ukraine U21	1	(0)
2020	Ukraine	4	(0)
- * Club domestic league appearances and goals as of 3 June 2026

Ihor Ihorovych Kharatin (Ukrainian: Ігор Ігорович Харатін; born 2 February 1995) is a Ukrainian professional footballer who plays as a defensive midfielder for Ukrainian Premier League club Veres Rivne.

== Career ==
=== Early career ===
Kharatin is product of the FC Dynamo Kyiv's Youth Sportive School. His first trainers were Oleksiy Drotsenko and Oleksandr Shpakov. He made his debut for Dynamo Kyiv in the Ukrainian Premier League played as a substituted player in the game against Zorya Luhansk on 18 May 2014.

In 2016, he played on loan for Metalist Kharkiv, then he transferred to Zorya Luhansk, where he played for two years.

=== Ferencváros ===
Kharatin joined Hungarian club Ferencváros in January 2019. On 20 October 2020, he scored his first UEFA Champions League goal for Ferencváros in a 5–1 defeat against Barcelona in the 2020–21 season.

On 16 June 2020, he became champion with Ferencváros by beating Budapest Honvéd at the Hidegkuti Nándor Stadion on the 30th match day of the 2019–20 Nemzeti Bajnokság I season.

On 29 September 2020, he was member of the Ferencváros team which qualified for the 2020–21 UEFA Champions League group stage after beating Molde FK on 3–3 aggregate (away goals) at the Groupama Aréna.

On 20 April 2021, he won the 2020–21 Nemzeti Bajnokság I season with Ferencváros by beating archrival Újpest FC 3–0 at the Groupama Arena.

=== Legia Warsaw ===
On 1 September 2021, Kharatin completed a €1.0 million move to Legia Warsaw, signing a three-year deal. He made his debut on 11 September as a substitute for Kacper Skibicki in a 0–1 away loss against Śląsk Wrocław in the Ekstraklasa and scored his first goal for Legia on 25 September, in a 2–3 league defeat against Raków Częstochowa. On 10 January 2024, he was moved to the III liga reserves.

=== DAC Dunajská Streda ===
On 14 February 2024, Slovak side DAC Dunajská Streda announced the signing of Kharatin until the end of the season, with an option for another year.

== Career statistics ==
=== Club ===
As of match played 26 October 2024

Appearances and goals by club, season and competition
Club	Season	League			National cup (Note: Includes Ukrainian Cup, Magyar Kupa, Polish Cup)		Continental		Other		Total	
Club	Season	Division	Apps	Goals	Apps	Goals	Apps	Goals	Apps	Goals	Apps	Goals
Dynamo Kyiv	2013–14	Ukrainian Premier League	1	0	—		—		—		1	0
Metalist Kharkiv (loan)	2015–16	Ukrainian Premier League	8	0	—		—		—		8	0
Zorya Luhansk	2016–17	Ukrainian Premier League	19	2	1	0	4 (Note: Appearances in UEFA Europa League)	0	—		24	2
Zorya Luhansk	2017–18	Ukrainian Premier League	29	3	1	1	6	1	—		36	5
Zorya Luhansk	2018–19	Ukrainian Premier League	16	2	1	0	4	0	—		21	2
Zorya Luhansk	Total		64	7	3	1	14	1	—		81	9
Ferencváros	2018–19	Nemzeti Bajnokság I	14	2	3	0	—		—		17	2
Ferencváros	2019–20	Nemzeti Bajnokság I	30	1	1	0	14 (Note: Six appearances and one goal in UEFA Champions League, eight appearances in UEFA Europa League)	1	—		45	2
Ferencváros	2020–21	Nemzeti Bajnokság I	25	4	2	0	10 (Note: Appearances in UEFA Champions League)	2	—		37	6
Ferencváros	2021–22	Nemzeti Bajnokság I	2	0	—		7	1	—		9	1
Ferencváros	Total		71	7	6	0	31	4	—		108	11
Legia Warsaw	2021–22	Ekstraklasa	11	1	1	0	4	0	—		16	1
Legia Warsaw	2022–23	Ekstraklasa	9	0	0	0	—		—		9	0
Legia Warsaw	Total		20	1	1	0	4	0	—		25	1
Legia Warsaw II	2021–22	III liga, group I	2	0	—		—		—		2	0
Legia Warsaw II	2022–23	III liga, group I	1	0	0	0	—		—		1	0
Legia Warsaw II	2023–24	III liga, group I	7	0	1	0	—		—		8	0
Legia Warsaw II	Total		10	0	1	0	—		—		11	0
DAC Dunajská Streda	2023–24	Slovak First Football League	7	0	0	0	—		—		7	0
Kolos Kovalivka	2024–25	Ukrainian Premier League	3	0	0	0	—		—		24	2
Kolos-2 Kovalivka	2024–25	Ukrainian Second League	7	2	—		—		—		7	2
Veres Rivne	2024–25	Ukrainian Premier League	0	0	—		—		—		0	0
Career total			191	17	11	1	49	5	0	0	251	23

== Honours ==
Ferencváros

- Nemzeti Bajnokság I: 2018–19, 2019–20, 2020–21, 2021–22
