= Emmanuel Dennis =

Nigerian footballer (born 1997)

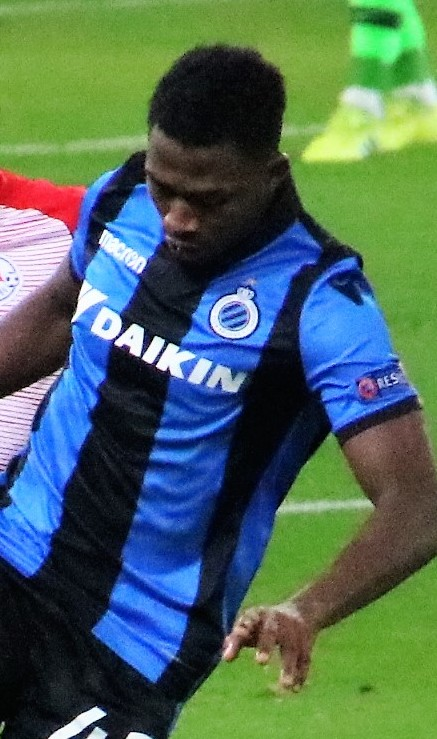
- Dennis playing for Club Brugge in 2019

Personal information
- Full name: Emmanuel Bonaventure Dennis
- Date of birth: 15 November 1997 (age 28)
- Place of birth: Yola, Nigeria
- Height: 1.75 m (5 ft 9 in)
- Positions: Forward; winger

Team information
- Current team: Brøndby
- Number: 17

Youth career
- 2010–2016: Kwara Football Academy Ilorin

Senior career*
Years	Team	Apps	(Gls)
2016–2017	Zorya Luhansk	22	(6)
2017–2021	Club Brugge	85	(19)
2021	→ 1. FC Köln (loan)	9	(0)
2021–2022	Watford	35	(10)
2022–2025	Nottingham Forest	19	(2)
2023–2024	→ İstanbul Başakşehir (loan)	8	(0)
2024	→ Watford (loan)	17	(4)
2025	→ Blackburn Rovers (loan)	6	(0)
2026–	Brøndby	11	(1)

International career
2019	Nigeria U23	1	(0)
2019–2022	Nigeria	8	(1)
- * Club domestic league appearances and goals as of 21:19, 14 May 2026 (UTC)

Emmanuel Bonaventure Dennis (born 15 November 1997) is a Nigerian professional footballer who plays as a forward for Danish Superliga club Brøndby.

Dennis began his senior career with Zorya Luhansk and later played for Club Brugge, Watford and Nottingham Forest. At Club Brugge, he won three Belgian First Division A titles, and he also had loan spells with 1. FC Köln, İstanbul Başakşehir, Watford and Blackburn Rovers before joining Brøndby in 2026.

Dennis has represented Nigeria under-23 and the Nigeria national team. He made his senior international debut in 2019 and was later part of Nigeria's squad during qualification for the 2022 FIFA World Cup.

== Club career ==
=== Early career ===
Dennis began his career at Kwara Football Academy Ilorin, located in Kwara State, Nigeria.

=== Zorya Luhansk ===
In March 2016, Dennis signed with Ukrainian Premier League club Zorya Luhansk. He made his debut in a game against Olimpik Donetsk on 24 July 2016, where he scored the opener in a 3–0 victory.

Dennis started the season on the bench mostly before being given his UEFA Europa League debut to Feyenoord on 3 November, which ended 1–1. After impressing against Feyenoord, he also played in the Ukrainian side's other group stage games, to Fenerbahçe and Manchester United. Zorya lost 2–0 in both matches and were eliminated from the group having finished in last place.

On 11 December, Dennis scored his second goal in a 2–0 win over Stal Kamianske. His performances attracted both Manchester City as well as an unknown Bundesliga side, who were interested in signing him in the winter transfer window. However, Dennis instead ended up staying with Zorya for the rest of the season, helping them to a third place in the league with his six goals in 22 league appearances.

=== Club Brugge ===
Club Brugge announced on 30 May 2017 that they had signed Dennis on a four-year deal for a fee of €1.2 million. He was given the number 42 jersey shirt. Dennis started the season extremely well, scoring five goals in six matches, including one on his debut on 26 July 2017 to İstanbul Başakşehir, a 3–3 draw and a brace three days later in the league over Lokeren, which finished in a 4–0 victory.

On 1 October 2019, Dennis scored twice in a 2–2 draw at the Santiago Bernabéu Stadium against Real Madrid in the group stage of the 2019–20 UEFA Champions League season.

Dennis claimed three league titles during his time at Club Brugge, in 2017–18, 2019–20, and in 2020–21, spending the second half of the season on loan at 1. FC Köln, but having playing minutes in the first-half of the season to claim a league winners medal.

==== 1. FC Köln ====
On 25 January 2021, Bundesliga side 1. FC Köln announced that they had signed Dennis on a loan deal until the end of the season. He made a total of nine league appearances during his time in Germany.

=== Watford ===
On 21 June 2021, Watford confirmed they had reached an agreement with Club Brugge for the transfer of Dennis. A five-year contract was signed two days later. On 14 August, Dennis scored on his Watford debut in their league opener against Aston Villa, where Watford won 3–2. Dennis was nominated for the Premier League Player of the Month award for November 2021 after scoring and creating two assists in a 4–1 win against Manchester United and scoring in a 4–2 defeat at Leicester City.

=== Nottingham Forest ===
On 13 August 2022, Dennis signed with Premier League side Nottingham Forest for an undisclosed transfer fee. The transfer fee was reported to be £10 million. However he failed to replicate the excellent form that he showed during his spell at Watford; struggling to establish himself in the newly-promoted Forest team. His last appearance for Forest was in May 2023 and he was eventually dropped from the squad altogether for the 2024-25 season, casting serious doubt on his future at the club.

On 15 September 2023, Dennis signed with Turkish side Istanbul Basaksehir on loan for the 2023–24 season. On 22 January 2024, Nottingham Forest terminated his loan deal with Istanbul Basaksehir to facilitate a move back to former club Watford on loan.

On 3 February 2025, Dennis joined Championship side Blackburn Rovers on a loan deal until the end of the season.

On 31 August 2025 it was announced that Nottingham Forest and Dennis had mutually agreed to end his contract.

=== Brøndby ===
On 9 January 2026, Dennis went on trial with Danish Superliga club Brøndby, whose head coach Steve Cooper had previously managed him at Nottingham Forest. On 22 January, he signed a contract until June 2028 and was assigned the number 17 shirt.

He made his competitive debut on 8 February, coming on for Jacob Ambæk in the 63rd minute of a 0–0 league draw against Randers. He made his first start a week later, playing the full 90 minutes in a 1–0 home defeat to Viborg.

== International career ==
Dennis represented Nigeria at under-23 level before being called up to the senior team. He made his debut on 10 September 2019 in a 2–2 friendly draw to Ukraine, coming on as a 82nd-minute substitute for Samuel Chukwueze.

The Nigeria Football Federation attempted to call Dennis up to the squad for the 2021 Africa Cup of Nations, accusing Watford of refusing to release Dennis. However, the NFF had failed to ask for his release in time. Dennis was part of the Nigerian squad that lost on away goals with an aggregate score-line of 1–1 to the Black Stars of Ghana in the third round of the 2022 FIFA World Cup qualifying.

== Career statistics ==
=== Club ===
As of match played 10 May 2026

Appearances and goals by club, season and competition
Club	Season	League			National cup (Note: Includes Ukrainian Cup, Belgian Cup, DFB-Pokal, FA Cup)		League cup (Note: Includes EFL Cup)		Europe		Total	
Club	Season	Division	Apps	Goals	Apps	Goals	Apps	Goals	Apps	Goals	Apps	Goals
Zorya Luhansk	2016–17	Ukrainian Premier League	22	6	1	0	—		3 (Note: Appearances in UEFA Europa League)	0	26	6
Club Brugge	2017–18	Belgian Pro League	30	7	4	4	—		4 (Note: Two appearances and one goal in UEFA Champions League, two appearances in UEFA Europa League)	1	38	12
Club Brugge	2018–19	Belgian Pro League	26	7	1	0	—		5 (Note: Three appearances in UEFA Champions League, two appearances in UEFA Europa League)	0	32	7
Club Brugge	2019–20	Belgian Pro League	20	5	2	0	—		11 (Note: Ten appearances and three goals in UEFA Champions League, one appearance and one goal in UEFA Europa League)	4	33	9
Club Brugge	2020–21	Belgian Pro League	9	0	0	0	—		4 (Note: Appearances in UEFA Champions League)	1	13	1
Club Brugge	Total		85	19	7	4	—		24	6	116	29
1. FC Köln (loan)	2020–21	Bundesliga	9	0	1	1	—		—		10	1
Watford	2021–22	Premier League	33	10	0	0	2	0	—		35	10
Watford	2022–23	Championship	2	0	0	0	0	0	—		2	0
Watford	Total		35	10	0	0	2	0	—		37	10
Nottingham Forest	2022–23	Premier League	19	2	1	0	5	0	—		25	2
Nottingham Forest	2023–24	Premier League	0	0	0	0	0	0	—		0	0
Nottingham Forest	2025–26	Premier League	0	0	0	0	0	0	—		0	0
Nottingham Forest	Total		19	2	1	0	5	0	0	0	25	2
İstanbul Başakşehir (loan)	2023–24	Süper Lig	8	0	0	0	—		—		8	0
Watford (loan)	2023–24	Championship	17	4	1	0	—		—		18	4
Blackburn Rovers (loan)	2024–25	Championship	6	0	1	0	—		—		7	0
Brøndby	2025–26	Danish Superliga	11	1	0	0	—		0	0	11	1
Total			212	42	12	5	7	0	27	6	258	53

=== International ===
As of match played 17 November 2022

Appearances and goals by national team and year
National team	Year	Apps	Goals
Nigeria	2019	2	0
Nigeria	2020	1	0
Nigeria	2022	5	1
Total		8	1

Scores and results list Nigeria's goal tally first.

List of international goals scored by Emmanuel Dennis
No.	Date	Venue	Opponent	Score	Result	Competition
1.	13 June 2022	Stade Adrar, Agadir, Morocco	São Tomé and Príncipe	10–0	10–0	2023 Africa Cup of Nations qualification

== Honours ==
Club Brugge

- Belgian First Division A: 2017–18, 2019–20, 2020–21
