= Oleh Chuvayev =

Ukrainian footballer (born 1987)

Personal information
- Full name: Oleh Serhiyovych Chuvayev
- Date of birth: 25 October 1987 (age 39)
- Place of birth: Kremenchuk, Ukrainian SSR, Soviet Union
- Height: 1.86 m (6 ft 1 in)
- Position: Goalkeeper

Youth career
- Vorskla Poltava

Senior career*
Years	Team	Apps	(Gls)
2003–2011	Vorskla Poltava	0	(0)
2003–2005	→ Vorskla-2 Poltava	13	(0)
2011	→ Kremin Kremenchuk (loan)	2	(0)
2012–2013	Mykolaiv	31	(0)
2013–2014	Sevastopol	17	(0)
2013	→ Sevastopol-2	1	(0)
2014–2016	Tom Tomsk	20	(0)
2015	→ Khimik Dzerzhinsk (loan)	8	(0)
2016–2019	Zorya Luhansk	1	(0)
2020–2021	Podillya Khmelnytskyi	31	(0)

International career^{‡}
2005	Ukraine U-18	6	(0)
2005	Ukraine U-19	4	(0)
- * Club domestic league appearances and goals as of 9 October 2021 ‡ National team caps and goals as of 16 February 2020

Oleh Serhiyovych Chuvayev (Ukrainian: Олег Сергійович Чуваєв; born 25 October 1987) is a Ukrainian former professional football goalkeeper.

== Career ==
He is the product of the Vorskla Poltava Youth School system. He also holds Russian citizenship as Oleg Sergeyevich Chuvayev (Russian: Олег Сергеевич Чуваев).
