= Kyrylo Doroshenko =

Ukrainian footballer

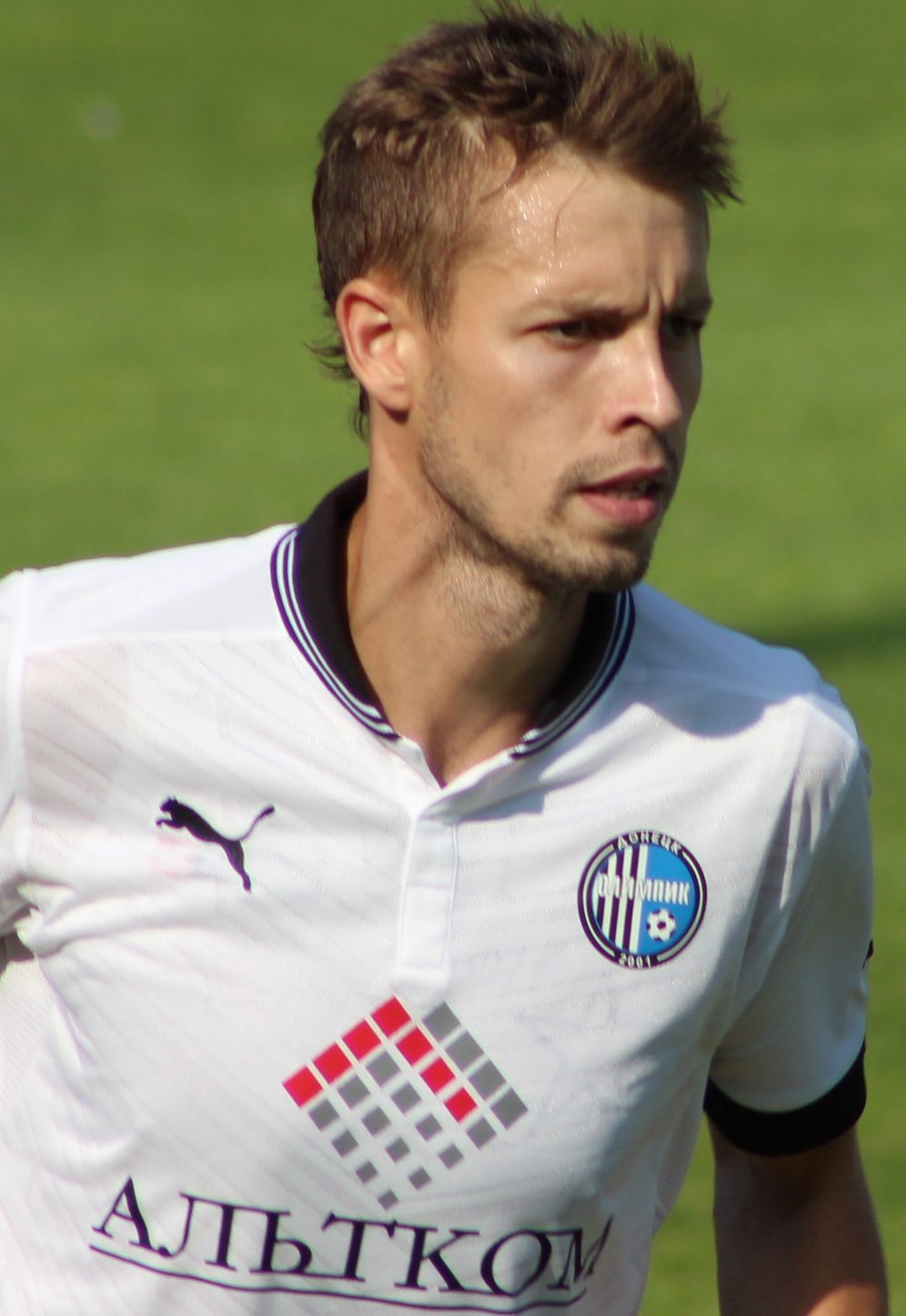

Personal information
- Full name: Kyrylo Oleksandrovych Doroshenko
- Date of birth: 17 November 1989 (age 36)
- Place of birth: Novomoskovsk, Ukrainian SSR
- Height: 1.81 m (5 ft 11 1/2 in)
- Position: Midfielder

Team information
- Current team: I Madonnari 1985

Youth career
- 2002–2006: Shakhtar Donetsk

Senior career*
Years	Team	Apps	(Gls)
2006–2010	Shakhtar Donetsk	0	(0)
2006	→ Shakhtar-2 Donetsk	2	(0)
2006–2008	→ Shakhtar-3 Donetsk	51	(14)
2008–2009	→ Stal Alchevsk (loan)	28	(4)
2009	→ Zirka Kirovohrad (loan)	8	(0)
2010–2015	Olimpik Donetsk	108	(17)
2015–2016	Zorya Luhansk	1	(0)
2016	Illichivets Mariupol	10	(0)
2017	Torpedo-BelAZ Zhodino	15	(1)
2018	Inhulets Petrove	9	(0)
2018	Kolkheti-1913 Poti	15	(2)
2019–2020	VPK-Ahro Shevchenkivka	17	(6)
2021	FC Standart Novi Sanzhary		

International career^{‡}
2004	Ukraine U16	4	(0)
2005–2006	Ukraine U17	10	(0)
2006–2007	Ukraine U18	9	(1)
- * Club domestic league appearances and goals as of 31 December 2020 ‡ National team caps and goals as of 25 May 2018

Kyrylo Doroshenko (Ukrainian: Кирило Олександрович Дорошенко; born 17 November 1989) is a Ukrainian former professional football midfielder.

== Career ==
Doroshenko is a product of FC Shakhtar Donetsk sportive school. He spent time with different Ukrainian teams that play in the Ukrainian First League.
