= Andriy Pylyavskyi =

Ukrainian footballer

Andriy Pylyavskyi Андрій Пилявський
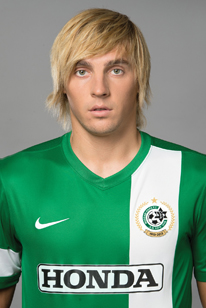
- Pylyavskyi with Maccabi Haifa in 2013

Personal information
- Full name: Andriy Borysovych Pylyavskyi
- Date of birth: 4 December 1988 (age 37)
- Place of birth: Kyiv, Ukrainian SSR, Soviet Union
- Height: 1.93 m (6 ft 4 in)
- Position: Centre back

Youth career
- 2001–2002: ATEK Kyiv
- 2002–2005: Shakhtar Donetsk
- 2006: Arsenal Kyiv

Senior career*
Years	Team	Apps	(Gls)
2007	Arsenal Kyiv	0	(0)
2009	Nafkom Brovary	9	(2)
2009–2010	Nyva Vinnytsia	39	(4)
2011–2014	Maccabi Haifa	48	(1)
2011–2012	→ Beitar Jerusalem (loan)	27	(0)
2014–2015	Zorya Luhansk	32	(3)
2016–2018	Rubin Kazan	3	(0)
2016	→ Vorskla Poltava (loan)	8	(0)
2017	→ Zorya Luhansk (loan)	7	(0)
2020–2022	Nyva Buzova		
2022–2023	Shturm Ivankiv		

International career
2014	Ukraine	1	(0)
- * Club domestic league appearances and goals

Andriy Pylyavskyi (Ukrainian: Андрій Борисович Пилявський; born 4 December 1988) is a Ukrainian former professional footballer who played as a defender.

Pylyavskyi is an alumnus of the youth academy "ATEK" in Kyiv and of FC Shakhtar Donetsk sports school.

== Club career ==
He began playing at age 7 in Kyiv, the capital of Ukraine. At the age of 17, he moved to Arsenal Kyiv. Upon his arrival, he was sent to play in the reserves. After recovering from a long-term injury, he was released by Arsenal Kyiv and signed with Nafkom. The team soon disbanded, and Pylyavskyi moved to Nyva Vinnytsia, where he helped the team earn promotion to the Ukrainian Premier League.

Pylyavski was signed by Maccabi Haifa in January 2011. In his first season with Maccabi Haifa, he won the championship and lost in the cup final. He scored his debut goal against Hapoel Acre in the Toto Cup.

In the 2012–13 season, Pylyavskyi scored a dramatic goal in the 95th minute to help his team beat Bnei Yehuda 1–0. In June 2013, he signed a one-year contract extension to stay with Maccabi Haifa.

On 10 February 2016, he signed with the Russian side FC Rubin Kazan.

== Club career statistics ==
(correct as of December 2011)

Club	Season	League			Cup			Toto Cup			Europe			Total		
Club	Season	Apps	Goals	Assists	Apps	Goals	Assists	Apps	Goals	Assists	Apps	Goals	Assists	Apps	Goals	Assists
Maccabi Haifa	2010–11	16	0	0	5	0	0	1	0	0	0	0	0	22	0	0
Maccabi Haifa	2011–12	0	0	0	0	0	0	0	0	0	3	0	0	3	0	0
Beitar Jerusalem (loan)	2011-12	27	0	0	1	0	0	0	0	0	0	0	0	28	0	0
Maccabi Haifa	2012–13	15	1	0	3	0	0	5	1	0	0	0	0	23	2	0
Maccabi Haifa	2013–14	0	0	0	0	0	0	0	0	0	1	0	0	1	0	0
Career		58	1	0	9	0	0	6	1	0	4	0	0	77	2	0

== Honours ==
- Israeli Premier League (1):
  - 2010–11
