= Oleksandr Matvyeyev =

Ukrainian footballer

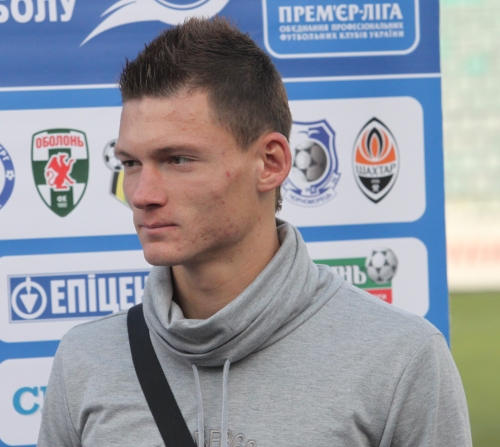

Personal information
- Full name: Oleksandr Ihorovych Matvyeyev
- Date of birth: 11 February 1989 (age 37)
- Place of birth: Poltava, Ukrainian SSR
- Height: 1.81 m (5 ft 11 1/2 in)
- Position: Centre-back

Youth career
- 2001–2003: YSS Horpynka Poltava
- 2003–2005: Vorskla Poltava
- 2005–2006: FC Molod Poltava

Senior career*
Years	Team	Apps	(Gls)
2006–2015	Vorskla Poltava	41	(2)
2007	→ Poltava (loan)	16	(1)
2015	Illichivets Mariupol	10	(0)
2015–2016	Oleksandriya	3	(0)
2017–2018	Kolos Kovalivka	23	(2)
2018–2019	Metalurh Zaporizhya	21	(1)
2019–2021	Standart Novi Sanzhary		

International career
2009–2010	Ukraine-21	10	(0)
- * Club domestic league appearances and goals as of 14 July 2018

Oleksandr Matvyeyev (Ukrainian: Олександр Ігорович Матвєєв; born 11 February 1989) is a professional Ukrainian footballer, who plays as a centre-back.
