= Rafael Forster =

Brazilian footballer (born 1990)

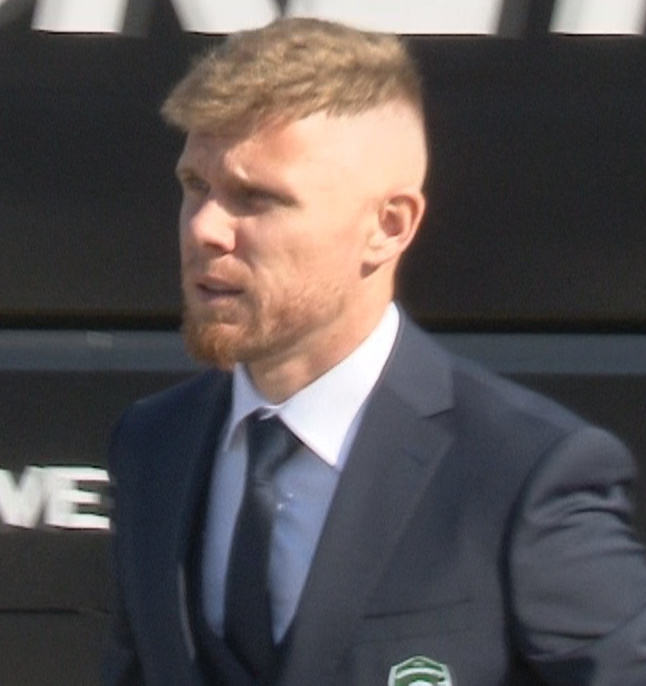

Personal information
- Full name: Rafael Forster
- Date of birth: 23 July 1990 (age 36)
- Place of birth: São José, Brazil
- Height: 1.81 m (5 ft 11 in)
- Positions: Centre back; left back

Team information
- Current team: São Bernardo

Youth career
- 2002–2009: Internacional

Senior career*
Years	Team	Apps	(Gls)
2010–2011	Internacional	0	(0)
2011	→ Náutico (loan)	3	(0)
2011	Audax	0	(0)
2012–2013	Audax Rio	26	(1)
2014–2015	Brasil de Pelotas	48	(6)
2015	Goiás	18	(0)
2016–2017	Zorya Luhansk	34	(6)
2017–2020	Ludogorets Razgrad II	9	(0)
2017–2020	Ludogorets Razgrad	29	(0)
2020–2021	Botafogo	22	(0)
2021	Juventude	39	(0)
2022	Juventude	28	(0)
2023	Santo André	3	(0)
2023	CSA	21	(0)
2023	Avaí	2	(0)
2024–	São Bernardo	0	(0)
- * Club domestic league appearances and goals as of 23 December 2023

Rafael Forster (born 23 July 1990) is a Brazilian professional footballer who plays as a defender for São Bernardo. Mainly a central defender, he can also play as a left-back.

== Club career ==
Born in São José, Santa Catarina, Rafael Forster was an Internacional youth graduate. On 1 March 2010 he was loaned to Náutico, making his senior debuts in that year's Campeonato Pernambucano.

After representing Audax São Paulo and Audax Rio de Janeiro, Rafael Forster signed for Brasil de Pelotas on 12 March 2013. After impressing with the latter, he joined Goiás on 20 April 2015.

Rafael Forster made his Série A debut on 10 May, starting in a 0–0 away draw against Vasco.

On 30 August 2017, Forster signed with Bulgarian champions Ludogorets Razgrad.

== Honours ==
Ludogorets

- Bulgarian First League (3): 2017–18, 2018–19, 2019–20
- Bulgarian Supercup (2): 2018, 2019
