= Slavutych-Arena =

Stadium in Zaporizhzhia, Ukraine

Coordinates: 47°51′35″N 35°05′49″E

- Slavutych Arena
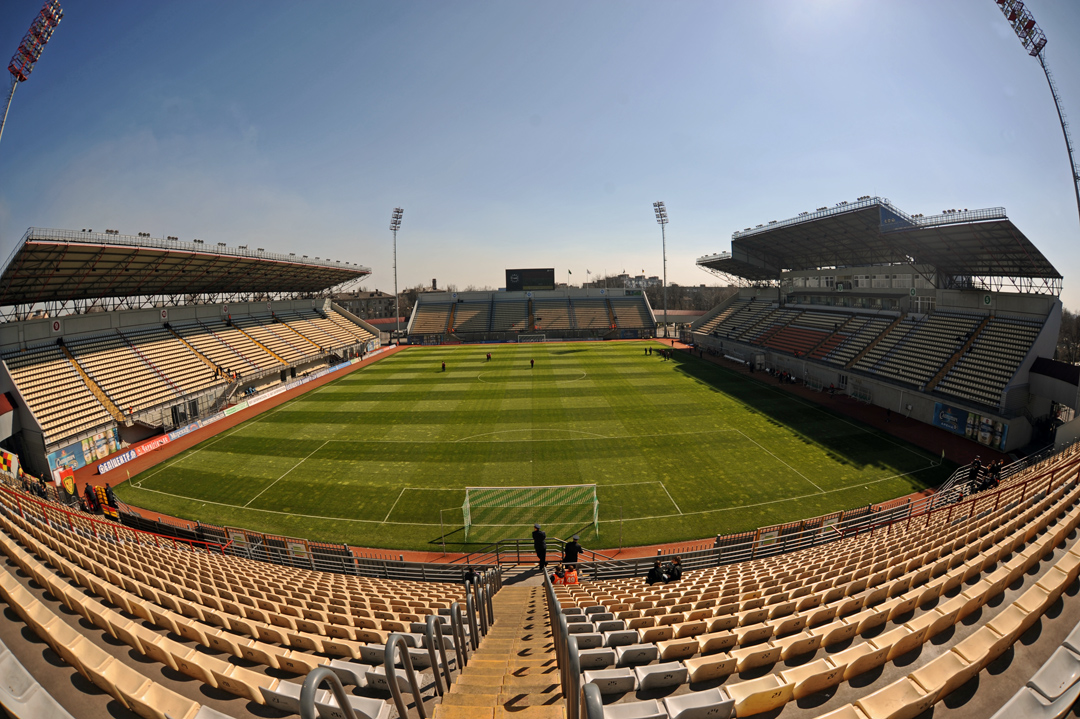
- Interactive map of Slavutych-Arena
- Location: Zaporizhzhia (Dniprovskyi District), Ukraine
- Owner: Metalurh Zaporizhzhia
- Capacity: 11,883 (football)
- Surface: Grass
- Field size: 105 m × 68 m (344 ft × 223 ft)

Construction
- Groundbreaking: 2002
- Opened: 29 July 2006; 20 years ago
- Cost: ₴456 million

Tenants
- Metalurh Zaporizhzhia (2006–2015); Zorya Luhansk (2014–present)

Slavutych Arena (Ukrainian: Славутич-Арена) is a football-only stadium in Zaporizhzhia, Ukraine. It is used for football matches and is the home of Metalurh Zaporizhzhia. The stadium's official maximum capacity is 12,000.

The stadium is located in a city neighborhood known as Sotsmisto, Dniprovskyi District. Sotsmisto or Sotsgorodok was the name of special experimental urban projects during the early periods of the Soviet Union.

== Central Stadium Metalurh ==
The stadium was built in 2006 in place of another stadium that was called Central Stadium Metalurh (or Metalurh Stadium) and which existed since 2 May 1938. The new stadium was built after complete demolishing of the previous stadium. In 2001, the Football Federation of Ukraine suspended the Metalurh Stadium and Metalurh played most of its home games at the AvtoZAZ Stadium which was a home ground of FC Torpedo Zaporizhzhia.

== Slavutych Arena ==
After the 2001-02 season, the Central Stadium Metalurh was completely demolished and on its place started to be built a new stadium. On 29 July 2006, the new Slavutych Arena was officially opened. After finishing of the new stadium, Metalurh played its games at new home stadium since July 2006.

The stadium is located on the left-bank of Dnieper near the well known Dnieper Hydro-Electric Station and the Metallurgists Park. Located in a central part of the city, Slavutych Arena is away from main train station, airport and major automobile highways.

The Slavutych Arena hosted the 2010 Ukrainian Super Cup final between Shakhtar Donetsk and Tavriya Simferopol. Shakhtar, the reigning league champions, won 7–1 in front of a crowd of 10,500. Since July 2014, due to the war in eastern Ukraine, Slavutych Arena has been the home of Zorya football club (Luhansk).

It also hosted the 2019 Ukrainian Cup Final between Shakhtar Donetsk and Inhulets Petrove, a 4-0 Shakhtar victory.

Due to ongoing conflict in Luhansk, FC Zorya Luhansk also plays home games at the stadium.

== Gallery ==
Main entrance

Street view

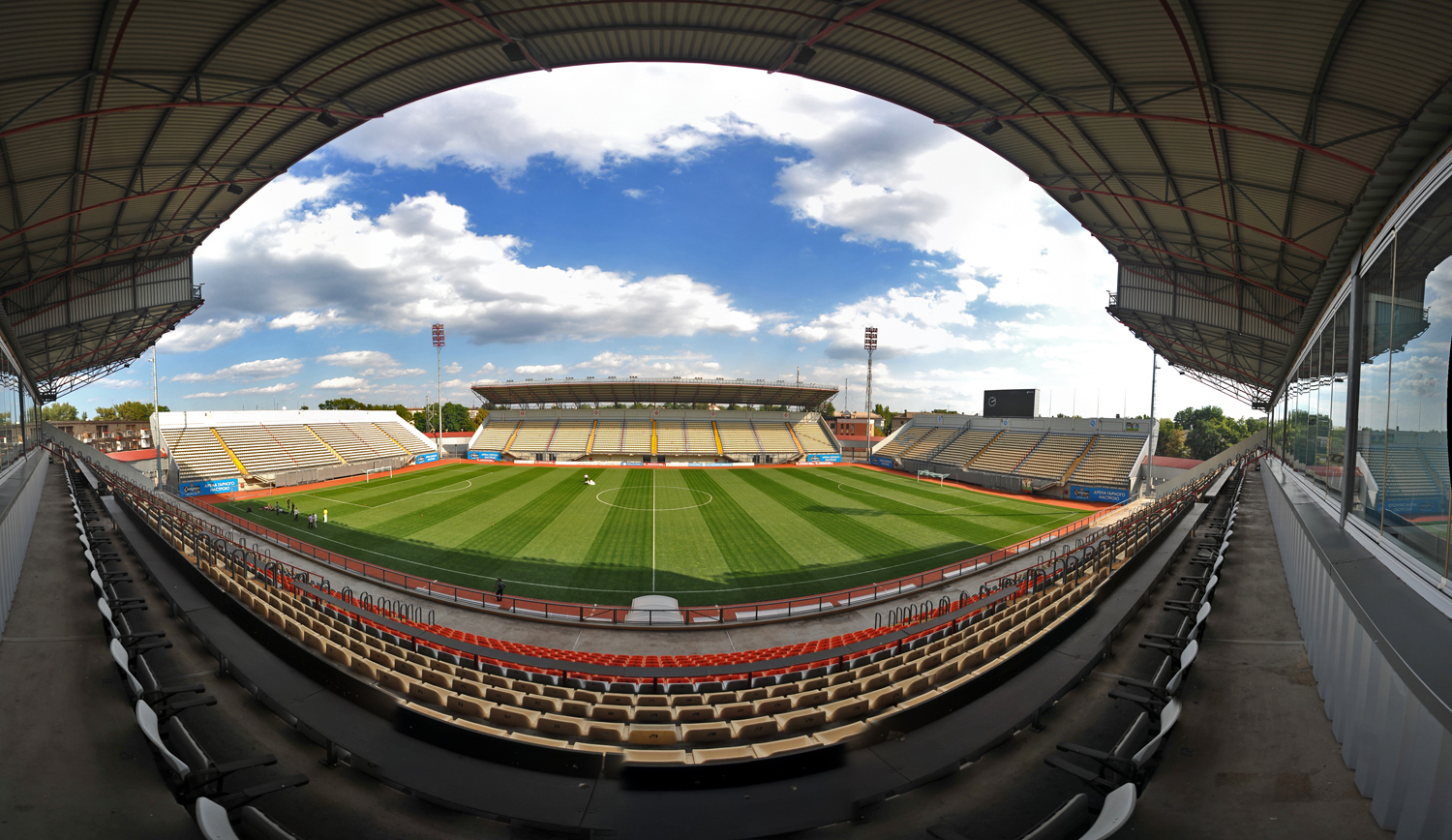
Field view (main stand)
