= Željko Ljubenović =

Serbian footballer

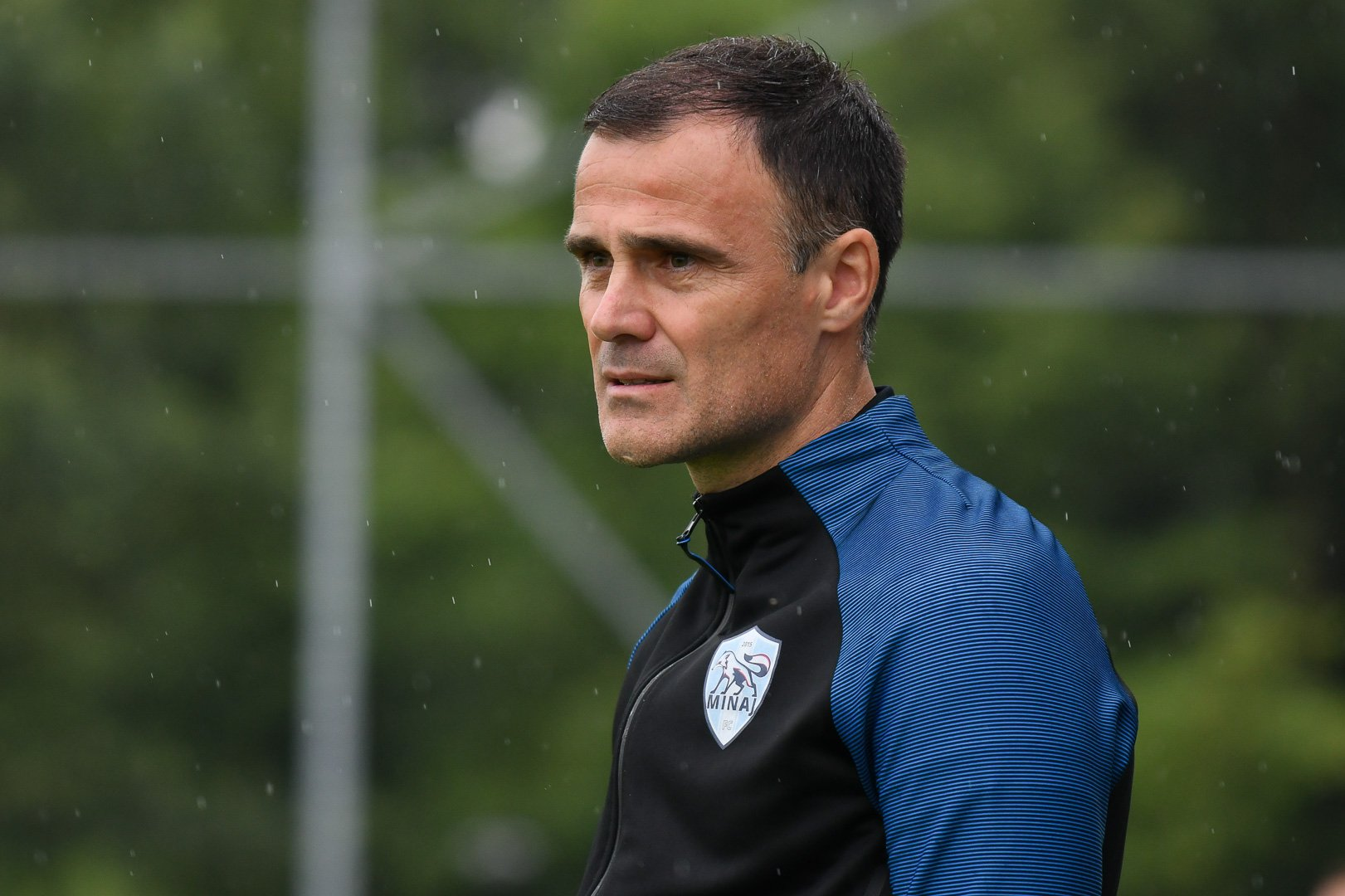

Personal information
- Date of birth: 9 July 1981 (age 45)
- Place of birth: Belgrade, SFR Yugoslavia
- Height: 1.74 m (5 ft 8 1/2 in)
- Position: Midfielder

Youth career
- 1990–1995: Partizan
- 1995–2000: OFK Beograd

Senior career*
Years	Team	Apps	(Gls)
2000–2001	OFK Beograd	7	(0)
2001–2002	Mladenovac		
2002–2004	Mladost Lukićevo	67	(12)
2005	Proleter Zrenjanin		
2005	Hajduk Kula	13	(0)
2006	Kryvbas Kryvyi Rih	8	(0)
2006–2011	Tavriya Simferopol	148	(18)
2012	Oleksandriya	9	(0)
2012–2018	Zorya Luhansk	137	(23)

Managerial career
- 2018–2019: Zorya Luhansk (scout)
- 2020: Zorya Luhansk (U19 assistant)
- 2022: Železničar Pančevo (assistant)
- 2023: Radnički Beograd (assistant)
- 2023–2025: Mynai
- 2025: Vorskla Poltava
- 2025–2026: Gagra
- * Club domestic league appearances and goals

Željko Ljubenović (Serbian Cyrillic: Жељко Љубеновић; born 9 July 1981) is a Serbian professional football coach and a former player who played as a midfielder and most recently worked as the manager of Erovnuli Liga club Gagra.

After playing almost exclusively for second-tier clubs in his homeland, Ljubenović spent most of his footballing career in Ukraine, representing four clubs and amassing over 250 appearances in the country's top league.

== Career ==
=== Playing ===
Born in Belgrade, Ljubenović started as a trainee at Partizan in 1990. He spent five years in the club's youth setup before switching to OFK Beograd in 1995. After completing his formation, Ljubenović made his senior debut with the Romantičari in the 2000–01 First League of FR Yugoslavia. He subsequently played for Second League clubs Mladenovac, Mladost Lukićevo, and Proleter Zrenjanin. In the summer of 2005, Ljubenović signed with top-flight side Hajduk Kula. He spent just half a season there before transferring abroad.

In the 2006 winter transfer window, Ljubenović moved to Ukraine and signed with Kryvbas Kryvyi Rih. He switched clubs the following summer and joined fellow top-tier club Tavriya Simferopol. Over the next five and a half years, Ljubenović played regularly for the side and recorded nearly 200 appearances in all competitions. He left the club midway through the 2011–12 season, eventually joining another Premier League side, Oleksandriya. In the summer of 2012, Ljubenović signed with Zorya Luhansk. After 6 seasons in Zorya, he retired in May 2018. In July 2018 Zorya's general director Serhiy Rafailov announced that Ljubenović will work in the club as scout in Balkan region.

=== Coaching ===
In 2020, Ljubenović was on the coaching staff of the Zorya junior squad that was competing at the UPL under-19 competitions.

In 2022 to 2023, Ljubenović was on the coaching staff of a couple of Serbian clubs.

On 18 November 2023, Ljubenović returned to the Ukrainian Premier League in the role of football manager to help struggling FC Mynai to remain in the league. In 2024, the club was relegated to the second tier (Persha Liha). During the 2024–25 season, Ljubenović, who had asked the club to release him, left the club in January 2025 after the club failed to qualify for the championship group, ending up in the relegation group instead. In the summer of 2025, Ljubenović signed with Vorskla Poltava, which had just been relegated to the 2nd tier after almost 30 years at the top tier. After less than a month, he left the club, according to the club's official statement, "due to family matters".

In October 2025, Georgian club Gagra announced that they had appointed Ljubenović as their head coach. Although the team finished this season in the top half of the table for the first time in history, he left Gagra in late September 2026.

== Honours ==
Tavriya Simferopol

- Ukrainian Cup: 2009–10
- Ukrainian Super Cup: Runner-up 2010

Zorya Luhansk

- Ukrainian Cup: Runner-up 2015–16
