= Ihor Chaykovskyi =

Ukrainian footballer

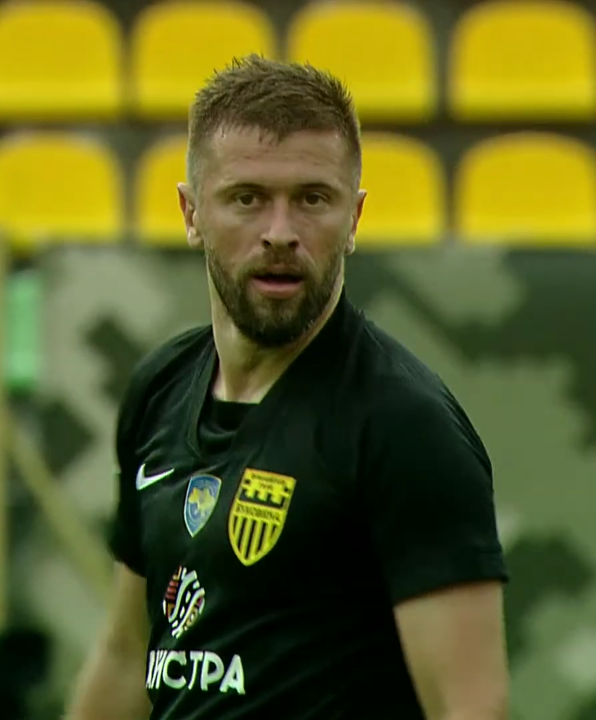

Personal information
- Full name: Ihor Hennadiyovych Chaykovskyi
- Date of birth: 7 October 1991 (age 35)
- Place of birth: Chernivtsi, Ukraine
- Height: 1.71 m (5 ft 7 in)
- Position: Midfielder

Team information
- Current team: Bukovyna Chernivtsi
- Number: 10

Youth career
- 2004: Bukovyna Chernivtsi
- 2005–2008: Shakhtar Donetsk

Senior career*
| Years | Team | Apps | (Gls) |
| 2008–2012 | Shakhtar Donetsk | 0 | (0) |
| 2008 | → Shakhtar-3 Donetsk | 6 | (0) |
| 2010 | → Zorya Luhansk (loan) | 28 | (0) |
| 2011–2012 | → Illichivets Mariupol (loan) | 29 | (0) |
| 2012–2013 | Illichivets Mariupol | 0 | (0) |
| 2012–2013 | → Zorya Luhansk (loan) | 14 | (0) |
| 2013–2017 | Zorya Luhansk | 59 | (3) |
| 2017–2018 | Anzhi Makhachkala | 14 | (0) |
| 2019–2020 | Zorya Luhansk | 14 | (0) |
| 2021 | Inhulets Petrove | 4 | (0) |
| 2021 | Polissya Zhytomyr | 17 | (0) |
| 2022 | Bukovyna Chernivtsi | 3 | (0) |
| 2022–2023 | Metalist Kharkiv | 16 | (0) |
| 2023– | Bukovyna Chernivtsi | 18 | (0) |

International career^{‡}
| 2008 | Ukraine U17 | 9 | (1) |
| 2009 | Ukraine U18 | 5 | (1) |
| 2008–2010 | Ukraine U19 | 13 | (5) |
| 2010–2011 | Ukraine U20 | 4 | (0) |
| 2010–2012 | Ukraine U21 | 7 | (1) |
Medal record
Men's football
Representing Ukraine
UEFA European Under-19 Championship
| Winner | 2009 Ukraine |
- * Club domestic league appearances and goals as of 20 June 2024 ‡ National team caps and goals as of 13 July 2012

Ihor Chaykovskyi (Ukrainian: Ігор Геннадійович Чайковський; born 7 October 1991) is a Ukrainian professional footballer who plays as a midfielder for Ukrainian First League club Bukovyna Chernivtsi.

== Club career ==
Chaykovskyi began his playing career with FC Bukovyna Chernivtsi and FC Shakhtar Donetsk's youth teams. He made his first team debut in the Premier League in Zorya Luhansk in a match against FC Dnipro Dnipropetrovsk on 28 February 2010.

On 19 June 2017, he signed with the Russian club FC Anzhi Makhachkala.

On 22 January 2019, FC Zorya Luhansk announced his return to the club on a 2.5-year contract.

== Honours ==
2009 UEFA European Under-19 Football Championship: Champion

== Career statistics ==
=== Club ===
As of 8 December 2018

| Club | Season | League | | | Cup | | Continental | | Total | |
| Club | Season | Division | Apps | Goals | Apps | Goals | Apps | Goals | Apps | Goals |
|---|---|---|---|---|---|---|---|---|---|---|
| FC Shakhtar-3 Donetsk | 2007–08 | Ukrainian Second League | 6 | 0 | – | | – | | 6 | 0 |
| FC Shakhtar Donetsk | 2007–08 | Ukrainian Premier League | 0 | 0 | 0 | 0 | 0 | 0 | 0 | 0 |
| FC Shakhtar Donetsk | 2008–09 | Ukrainian Premier League | 0 | 0 | 0 | 0 | 0 | 0 | 0 | 0 |
| FC Shakhtar Donetsk | 2009–10 | Ukrainian Premier League | 0 | 0 | 0 | 0 | 0 | 0 | 0 | 0 |
| FC Shakhtar Donetsk | Total | | 0 | 0 | 0 | 0 | 0 | 0 | 0 | 0 |
| FC Zorya Luhansk | 2009–10 | Ukrainian Premier League | 14 | 0 | – | | – | | 14 | 0 |
| FC Zorya Luhansk | 2010–11 | Ukrainian Premier League | 14 | 0 | 1 | 0 | – | | 15 | 0 |
| FC Illichivets | 2010–11 | Ukrainian Premier League | 9 | 0 | – | | – | | 9 | 0 |
| FC Illichivets | 2011–12 | Ukrainian Premier League | 20 | 0 | 0 | 0 | – | | 20 | 0 |
| FC Illichivets | 2012–13 | Ukrainian Premier League | 0 | 0 | 0 | 0 | – | | 0 | 0 |
| FC Illichivets | Total | | 29 | 0 | 0 | 0 | 0 | 0 | 29 | 0 |
| FC Zorya Luhansk | 2012–13 | Ukrainian Premier League | 14 | 0 | 0 | 0 | – | | 14 | 0 |
| FC Zorya Luhansk | 2013–14 | Ukrainian Premier League | 13 | 1 | 0 | 0 | – | | 13 | 1 |
| FC Zorya Luhansk | 2014–15 | Ukrainian Premier League | 14 | 0 | 4 | 0 | 5 | 0 | 23 | 0 |
| FC Zorya Luhansk | 2015–16 | Ukrainian Premier League | 15 | 1 | 7 | 0 | 3 | 0 | 25 | 1 |
| FC Zorya Luhansk | 2016–17 | Ukrainian Premier League | 17 | 1 | 0 | 0 | 5 | 0 | 22 | 1 |
| FC Zorya Luhansk | Total (2 spells) | | 101 | 3 | 12 | 0 | 13 | 0 | 126 | 3 |
| FC Anzhi Makhachkala | 2017–18 | Russian Premier League | 1 | 0 | 0 | 0 | – | | 1 | 0 |
| FC Anzhi Makhachkala | 2018–19 | Russian Premier League | 12 | 0 | 2 | 0 | – | | 14 | 0 |
| FC Anzhi Makhachkala | Total | | 13 | 0 | 2 | 0 | 0 | 0 | 15 | 0 |
| Career total | | | 149 | 3 | 14 | 0 | 13 | 0 | 176 | 3 |
