= Mykyta Kamenyuka =

Ukrainian footballer (born 1985)

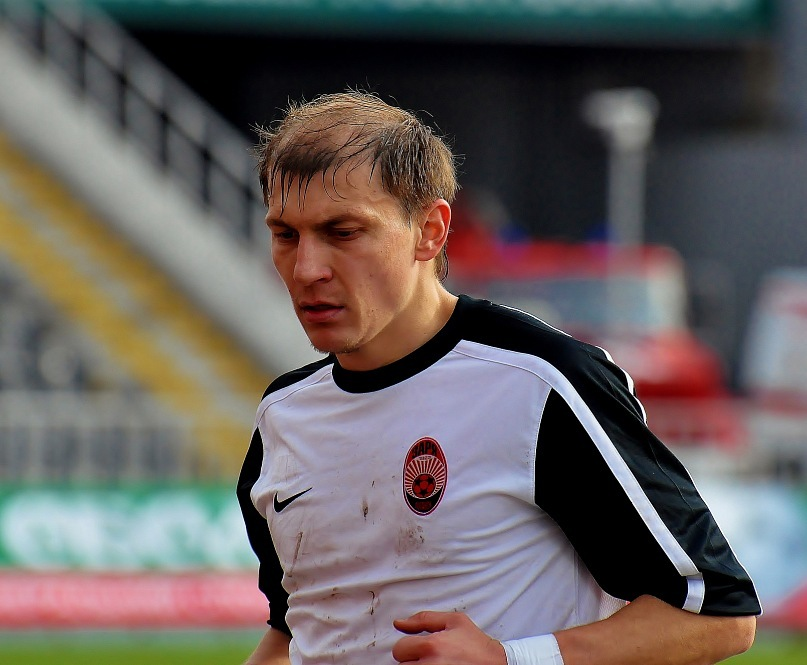

Personal information
- Full name: Mykyta Oleksandrovych Kamenyuka
- Date of birth: 3 June 1985 (age 41)
- Place of birth: Voroshylovhrad, Ukrainian SSR
- Height: 1.72 m (5 ft 7 1/2 in)
- Position: Defender

Team information
- Current team: Zorya Luhansk (assistant)

Youth career
- 1999–2002: SSOR Ukrayina Luhansk

Senior career*
Years	Team	Apps	(Gls)
2003	Avanhard Rovenky	14	(0)
2004–2007	Zorya Luhansk	74	(4)
2007–2008	Illichivets Mariupol	32	(6)
2008–2020	Zorya Luhansk	238	(15)
2018	→ Veres Rivne (loan)	8	(0)
Total		366	(25)

International career^{‡}
2016	Ukraine	1	(0)

Managerial career
- 2020–2022: Zorya Luhansk (U-19) (assistant)
- 2022–: Zorya Luhansk (assistant)
- * Club domestic league appearances and goals as of 20 July 2020 ‡ National team caps and goals as of 20 July 2020

Mykyta Kamenyuka (Ukrainian: Микита Олександрович Каменюка; born 3 June 1985) is a retired Ukrainian professional football midfielder who is most known for playing for Zorya Luhansk in the Ukrainian Premier League.

Kamenyuka is a product of the Youth Sportive School Ukrayina Luhansk. His first trainer was Yuriy Robochyi. He moved back from Illichivets to Zorya during the 2008–09 summer transfer season.
