= Yevhen Opanasenko =

Ukrainian footballer

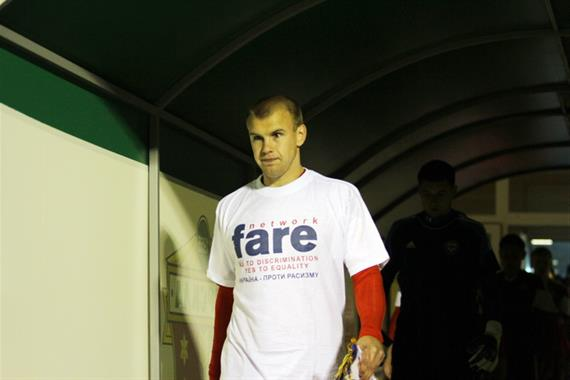

Personal information
- Full name: Yevhen Volodymyrovych Opanasenko
- Date of birth: 25 August 1990 (age 36)
- Place of birth: Zaporizhia, Ukrainian SSR
- Height: 1.80 m (5 ft 11 in)
- Position: Defender

Team information
- Current team: Poltava
- Number: 39

Youth career
- 2001–2003: Krystal Kherson
- 2003–2007: Metalurh Zaporizhzhia

Senior career*
Years	Team	Apps	(Gls)
2007–2008	Metalurh-2 Zaporizhzhia	27	(2)
2008–2014	Metalurh Zaporizhzhia	124	(6)
2014–2015	Chornomorets Odesa	10	(0)
2015–2018	Zorya Luhansk	74	(7)
2018–2019	Konyaspor	9	(0)
2020–2021	Vorskla Poltava	5	(0)
2021–2022	Inhulets Petrove	13	(0)
2022–2023	Kryvbas Kryvyi Rih	7	(0)
2023–	Poltava	43	(1)

International career^{‡}
2010	Ukraine-20	2	(0)
2010–2012	Ukraine-21	16	(0)
- * Club domestic league appearances and goals as of 24 December 2025 ‡ National team caps and goals as of 11 January 2021

Yevhen Volodymyrovych Opanasenko (Ukrainian: Євген Володимирович Опанасенко; born 25 August 1990) is a Ukrainian football defender who plays for Poltava.

== Career ==
Opanasenko is a product of the youth team systems at FC Krystal Kherson and FC Metalurh Zaporizhzhia. He made his debut for FC Metalurh entering as a second-half substitute against FC Dynamo Kyiv on 17 August 2008 in the Ukrainian Premier League.

He is also a member of the Ukraine national under-21 football team, called up by Pavlo Yakovenko, and made his debut as a second-half substitute in a match against the Netherlands national under-21 football team.

In July 2022 he signed for Kryvbas Kryvyi Rih.
