= Jaba Lipartia =

Georgian footballer

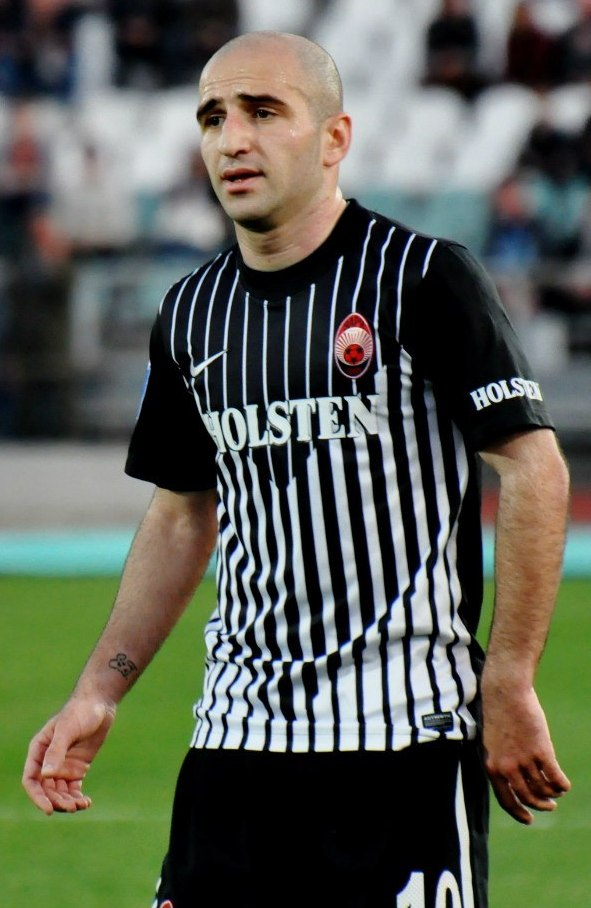
- Lipartia with Zorya Luhansk in 2012

Personal information
- Date of birth: 16 November 1987 (age 38)
- Place of birth: Tbilisi, Georgian SSR
- Height: 1.74 m (5 ft 9 in)
- Position: Attacking midfielder

Senior career*
Years	Team	Apps	(Gls)
2005–2006	Tbilisi	2	(0)
2006–2010	WIT Georgia	94	(21)
2011–2017	Zorya Luhansk	145	(11)
2017–2018	Anzhi Makhachkala	6	(0)
2018	Torpedo Kutaisi	12	(0)
2018	Samtredia	16	(2)
2019	Arsenal Kyiv	11	(0)
2019–2020	Buxoro	14	(0)
Total		300	(34)

International career
2008	Georgia U21	1	(0)
2009–2012	Georgia	2	(0)
- * Club domestic league appearances and goals

Jaba Lipartia (Georgian: ჯაბა ლიპარტია; born 16 November 1987) is a Georgian football coach and former player.

== Club career ==
He formerly played for FC Tbilisi and WIT Georgia.

He was released from his contract by FC Anzhi Makhachkala on 25 January 2018.

On 25 February 2018, he returned to Georgia, signing with FC Torpedo Kutaisi.

In 2019 he signed for Arsenal Kyiv. Later that month he signed for FC Buxoro.
