= Artem Hordiyenko =

Ukrainian footballer

Personal information
- Full name: Artem Oleksandrovych Hordiyenko
- Date of birth: 4 March 1991 (age 35)
- Place of birth: Krasnyi Luch, Ukrainian SSR
- Height: 1.81 m (5 ft 11 in)
- Position: Midfielder

Youth career
- 1997–2004: Shakhtar Krasnyi Luch
- 2004–2008: LVUFK Luhansk

Senior career*
Years	Team	Apps	(Gls)
2008–2018	Zorya Luhansk	96	(10)
2019	Sheriff Tiraspol	6	(0)
2020–2021	Oleksandriya	14	(1)
2021–2022	Kryvbas Kryvyi Rih	12	(0)

International career
2008	Ukraine U18	1	(0)
- * Club domestic league appearances and goals as of 2 February 2023

Artem Oleksandrovych Hordiyenko (Ukrainian: Артем Олександрович Гордієнко; born 4 March 1991) is a Ukrainian professional footballer who plays as a midfielder.

== Career ==
He is a product of the FC Shakhtar Krasnyi Luch and LVUFK Luhansk sportive schools.

Hordiyenko made his debut for main Zorya team in full-time match against Tavriya Simferopol in Ukrainian Premier League on 26 May 2013.
