= Dmytro Hrechyshkin =

Ukrainian footballer

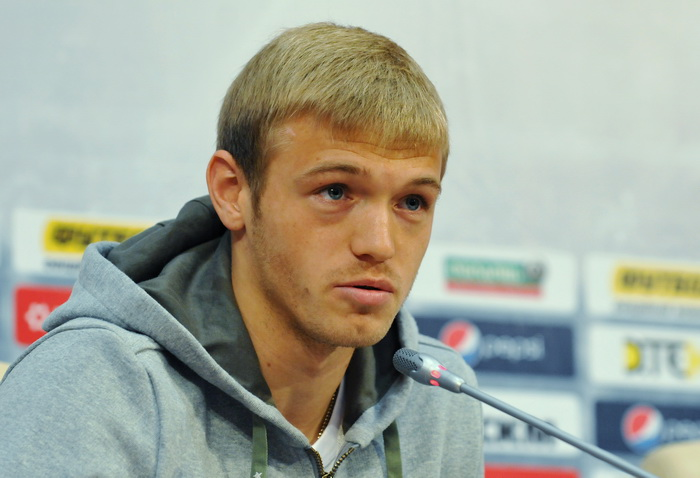

Personal information
- Full name: Dmytro Volodymyrovych Hrechyshkin
- Date of birth: 22 September 1991 (age 35)
- Place of birth: Sievierodonetsk, Ukraine
- Height: 1.77 m (5 ft 9 1/2 in)
- Position: Defensive midfielder

Youth career
- 2004: Yunist Luhansk
- 2004–2008: Olimpik Donetsk
- 2008: Shakhtar Donetsk

Senior career*
Years	Team	Apps	(Gls)
2008–2012	Shakhtar Donetsk	0	(0)
2011–2012	→ Illichivets Mariupol (loan)	11	(0)
2012–2013	Illichivets Mariupol	15	(1)
2013–2018	Shakhtar Donetsk	15	(1)
2014	→ Illichivets Mariupol (loan)	10	(0)
2014–2015	→ Chornomorets Odesa (loan)	16	(0)
2015–2017	→ Zorya Luhansk (loan)	59	(4)
2018–2021	Oleksandriya	73	(8)
2021–2023	Gençlerbirliği	52	(2)
2023–2024	Sakaryaspor	12	(0)

International career^{‡}
2008–2009	Ukraine U19	16	(0)
2010–2012	Ukraine U21	26	(2)
2013	Ukraine	2	(0)
- * Club domestic league appearances and goals as of 13 June 2023 ‡ National team caps and goals as of 26 June 2017

Dmytro Hrechyshkin (Ukrainian: Дмитро Володимирович Гречишкін, born 22 September 1991) is a Ukrainian professional footballer who plays as a midfielder.

== Career ==
Hrechyshkin was the member of different Ukrainian national football teams. He also is member of Ukraine national under-21 football team for friendly match against Czech Republic national under-21 football team on 17 November 2010.
