= Hryhoriy Yarmash =

Ukrainian footballer (born 1985)

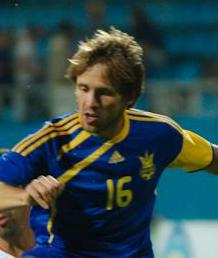

Personal information
- Full name: Hryhoriy Petrovych Yarmash
- Date of birth: 4 January 1985 (age 41)
- Place of birth: Zaliztsi, Ternopil Oblast, Ukrainian SSR
- Height: 1.74 m (5 ft 9 in)
- Position: Defender

Youth career
- 1998–2000: UFK Lviv
- 2000–2001: FC Obukhiv

Senior career*
Years	Team	Apps	(Gls)
2001–2005	Dynamo Kyiv	0	(0)
2001–2002	→ Borysfen-2 Boryspil (loan)	22	(0)
2002–2003	→ Dynamo-3 Kyiv	13	(0)
2002–2005	→ Dynamo-2 Kyiv	72	(2)
2005–2010	Vorskla Poltava	142	(2)
2011–2017	Zorya Luhansk	84	(0)
Total		333	(4)

International career
2000	Ukraine U16	1	(0)
2001–2002	Ukraine U17	11	(0)
2005	Ukraine U20	3	(0)
2003–2006	Ukraine U21	28	(0)
2008–2009	Ukraine	8	(0)

Managerial career
- 2017–2022: Zorya Luhansk (assistant)
Medal record
Men's football
Representing Ukraine
UEFA European Under-19 Championship
Bronze medal – third place	2004 Switzerland
UEFA European Under-21 Championship
Runner-up	2006 Portugal
- * Club domestic league appearances and goals

Hryhoriy Yarmash (Ukrainian: Григорій Петрович Ярмаш; born 4 January 1985) is a Ukrainian former professional footballer who played as a defender.

== Career ==
Yarmash played at Dynamo Kyiv before joining Vorskla Poltava in July 2005 where he spent five seasons in the Ukrainian Premier League.

Yarmash last played for Zorya Luhansk

In 2008, Oleksiy Mykhailychenko called up him to the Ukraine national team. Yarmash earned eight caps.

== Honours ==
Ukraine U21

- UEFA Under-21 Championship: runner-up 2006
