= 2015–16 FC Zorya Luhansk season =

Zorya Luhansk
2015–16 season
- Chairman: Yevhen Heller
- Manager: Yuriy Vernydub
- Stadium: Slavutych-Arena
- Premier League: 4th
- Ukrainian Cup: Final
- UEFA Europa League: Play-off round
- Top goalscorer: League: Budkivskyi (14); All: Budkivskyi (17)
- Highest home attendance: 1,500 vs Metalist Kharkiv; 25 July 2015
- Lowest home attendance: 1,000 vs Olimpik Donetsk; 9 August 2015
Home colours	Away colours

The 2014–15 Zorya Luhansk season was Zorya's sixteenth Ukrainian Premier League season, and their sixth season under manager Yuriy Vernydub. During the season Zorya Luhansk competed in the Ukrainian Premier League, Ukrainian Cup and in the UEFA Europa League.

== Transfers ==
=== In ===
==== Summer ====
Position	Nationality	Name	From	Type
MF	(Ukraine)	Kyrylo Doroshenko	(Ukraine) Olimpik Donetsk	Transfer
DF	(Belarus)	Mikhail Sivakow	(Azerbaijan) Gabala FK	Transfer
DF	(Ukraine)	Vyacheslav Checher	(Ukraine) Metalurh Donetsk	Transfer
DF	(Ukraine)	Oleg Borodai	Reserves	Promotion
FW	(Ukraine)	Artur Zahorulko	(Ukraine) Shakhtar Donetsk	Loan
MF	(Ukraine)	Dmytro Hrechyshkin	(Ukraine) Shakhtar Donetsk	Loan
DF	(Ukraine)	Vyacheslav Tankovskyi	(Ukraine) Shakhtar Donetsk	Loan

==== Winter ====
Position	Nationality	Name	From	Type
DF	(Ukraine)	Artem Sukhotskyi	(Ukraine) Oleksandriya	Transfer
FW	(Brazil)	Paulinho	(Brazil) Corinthians	Transfer
DF	(Ukraine)	Yevhen Tkachuk	(Ukraine) Vorskla Poltava	Transfer
DF	(Brazil)	Rafael Forster	Unattached	
GK	(Ukraine)	Oleksiy Shevchenko	(Ukraine) Dynamo Kyiv	Transfer
FW	(Ukraine)	Denys Bezborodko	(Ukraine) Shakhtar Donetsk	Loan

=== Out ===
==== Summer ====
Position	Nationality	Name	To	Type
GK	(Ukraine)	Rustam Khudzhamov	(Ukraine) Shakhtar Donetsk	Loan return
MF	(Ukraine)	Maksym Malyshev	(Ukraine) Shakhtar Donetsk	Loan return
DF	(Ukraine)	Oleksandr Hrytsay		End of career
DF	(Ukraine)	Maksim Bilyi	(Croatia) Hajduk Split	Transfer
DF	(Ukraine)	Vitaliy Vernydub	(Azerbaijan) Gabala FK	Transfer
MF	(Ukraine)	Dmytro Khomchenovskyi	(Spain) Ponferradina	Transfer

==== Winter ====
Position	Nationality	Name	To	Type
FW	(Ukraine)	Artur Zahorulko	(Ukraine) Shakhtar Donetsk	Loan return
MF	(Ukraine)	Ruslan Malinovskyi	(Ukraine) Shakhtar Donetsk	Loan return
MF	(Ukraine)	Ihor Kalinin	Unattached	Released
DF	(Ukraine)	Oleg Borodai	Unattached	Released
GK	(Croatia)	Krševan Santini	(Cyprus) Enosis Neon Paralimni	Transfer
GK	(Ukraine)	Andriy Poltavtsev	(Georgia (country)) Guria Lanchkhuti	Loan
DF	(Ukraine)	Andriy Pylyavskyi	(Russia) Rubin Kazan	Transfer

== Squad ==
Squad is given according to the club's official site, and composed from players who playing in the main squad team as of 25 February 2016.

Note: Flags indicate national team as defined under FIFA eligibility rules; some limited exceptions apply. Players may hold more than one non-FIFA nationality.

No.	Pos.	Nation	Player
1	GK	UKR	Oleksiy Shevchenko
2	DF	UKR	Artem Sukhotskyi
3	DF	BLR	Mikhail Sivakov
4	MF	UKR	Ihor Chaykovskyi
5	DF	UKR	Artem Hordiyenko
6	MF	UKR	Mykyta Kamenyuka (captain)
8	MF	UKR	Vyacheslav Tankovskyi (on loan from Shakhtar)
10	FW	GEO	Jaba Lipartia
11	FW	BRA	Paulinho
12	DF	BRA	Rafael Forster
16	DF	UKR	Hryhoriy Yarmash
17	FW	UKR	Yaroslav Kvasov
20	MF	UKR	Oleksandr Karavayev (on loan from Shakhtar)
22	MF	SRB	Željko Ljubenović

No.	Pos.	Nation	Player
23	MF	UKR	Kyrylo Doroshenko
24	MF	UKR	Dmytro Hrechyshkin (on loan from Shakhtar)
27	DF	UKR	Yevhen Tkachuk
28	FW	UKR	Pylyp Budkivskyi (on loan from Shakhtar)
29	MF	UKR	Andriy Totovytskyi (on loan from Shakhtar)
30	GK	UKR	Mykyta Shevchenko (on loan from Shakhtar)
34	MF	UKR	Ivan Petryak (on loan from Shakhtar)
39	DF	UKR	Yevhen Opanasenko
42	DF	NGR	Dennis Emmanuel Bonaventure
44	DF	UKR	Vyacheslav Checher
49	FW	UKR	Dmytro Lukanov
59	FW	UKR	Denys Bezborodko (on loan from Shakhtar)
91	GK	UKR	Ihor Levchenko

=== Out on loan ===
Note: Flags indicate national team as defined under FIFA eligibility rules; some limited exceptions apply. Players may hold more than one non-FIFA nationality.

No.	Pos.	Nation	Player
—	GK	UKR	Andriy Poltavtsev (on loan to Guria Lanchkhuti)

No.	Pos.	Nation	Player
—	MF	UKR	Mykhaylo Shershen (on loan to Kremin Kremenchuk)
—	MF	UKR	Maksym Banasevych (on loan to Desna Chernihiv)

== Competitions ==
=== Premier League ===
==== League table ====
Pos	Team	Pld	W	D	L	GF	GA	GD	Pts	Qualification or relegation
2	Shakhtar Donetsk	26	20	3	3	76	25	+51	63	Qualification to Champions League third qualifying round (Note: Shakhtar Donetsk qualified for the Europa League group stage by winning the 2015–16 Ukrainian Cup. However, since they already qualified for European competition based on their league position, the spot awarded to the cup winners was passed down the league.)
3	Dnipro Dnipropetrovsk (Note: On 31 March 2016, the Adjudicatory Chamber of the UEFA Club Financial Control Body (CFCB) announced that Dnipro Dnipropetrovsk will be excluded from participating in the next UEFA club competition for which they would otherwise qualify in the next three (3) seasons (i.e. the 2016–17, 2017–18 and 2018–19 seasons).)	26	16	5	5	50	22	+28	53	
4	Zorya Luhansk	26	14	6	6	51	26	+25	48	Qualification to Europa League group stage
5	Vorskla Poltava	26	11	9	6	32	26	+6	42	Qualification to Europa League third qualifying round
6	FC Oleksandriya	26	10	8	8	30	29	+1	38	Qualification to Europa League third qualifying round

Source: uafootball.net.ua
Rules for classification: 1) Points; 2) Goal difference; 3) Goals scored; 4) Head-to-head points; 5) Head-to-head goal difference; 6) Head-to-head goals scored; 7) Fairplay ranking; 8) Draw.

==== Results summary ====
Overall								Home						Away					
Pld	W	D	L	GF	GA	GD	Pts	W	D	L	GF	GA	GD	W	D	L	GF	GA	GD
20	11	5	4	41	24	+17	38	6	3	2	23	19	+4	5	2	2	18	5	+13

==== Results by round ====
Round	1	2	3	4	5	6	7	8	9	10	11	12	13	14	15	16	17	18	19	20	21	22	23	24	25	26
Ground	A	H	A	H	A	H	A	A	H	A	H	H	H	A	H	A	A	H	A	H	H	A	H	A	H	A
Result	W	D	L	W	W	D	D	W	D	W	W	L	L	W	W	W	D	W	L	W	L	L	D	W	L	W
Position	1	3	6	4	2	3	4	4	4	4	4	4	4	4	3	3	3	3	3	3	3	4	4	4	4	4

Updated to match(es) played on 19 May 2016. Source: Socceraway
A = Away; H = Home; W = Win; D = Draw; L = Loss

==== Matches ====
17 July 2015 1	Metalurh Zaporizhya	0–6	Zorya Luhansk	Zaporizhia
19:00 EEST (UTC+3)	Zhurakhovskyi (yellow card) 42'; Kulynych (yellow card) 43'; Lysytskyi (yellow card) 72'	Summary	Khomchenovskyi 17'; Ljubenović 34'; Malinovskyi 50'; Karavayev 72'; Kamenyuka 81'; Sivakow 90+3'	Stadium: Slavutych-Arena; Attendance: 3,500; Referee: Anatoliy Abdula

25 July 2015 2	Zorya Luhansk	0–0	Metalist Kharkiv	Zaporizhia
19:30 EEST (UTC+3)	Malinovskyi (yellow card) 57'	Summary	Kurylov (yellow card) 70'	Stadium: Slavutych-Arena; Attendance: 1,500; Referee: Yuriy Mozharovsky

2 August 2015 3	Stal Dniprodzerzhynsk	2–0	Zorya Luhansk	Dnipropetrovsk
19:30 EEST (UTC+3)	Putrash 25', 55'; Vasin (yellow card) 62'	Summary	Lukanov (yellow card) 34'; Lipartia (yellow card) 52'; Yarmash (yellow card) 71'	Stadium: Meteor Stadium; Attendance: 2,600; Referee: Anatolii Zhabchenko

9 August 2015 4	Zorya Luhansk	4–0	Olimpik Donetsk	Zaporizhia
19:30 EEST (UTC+3)	Budkivskyi (yellow card) 33' (goal) 82', 85'; Lipartia 43'; Petryak 62'	Summary	Isa (yellow card) 47'; Semenyna (yellow card) 90'	Stadium: Slavutych-Arena; Attendance: 1,000; Referee: Ivan Bondar

16 August 2015 5	Chornomorets Odesa	0–2	Zorya Luhansk	Odesa
19:30 EEST (UTC+3)	Petko (yellow card) 20'; Shapoval (yellow card) 30'	Summary	Shevchenko (yellow card) 30'; Petryak 47'; Karavayev 56'	Stadium: Chornomorets Stadium; Attendance: 9,244; Referee: (Ukraine) Sergii Boiko

30 August 2015 6	Zorya Luhansk	0–0	Dynamo Kyiv	Zaporizhia
19:30 EEST (UTC+3)	Pylyavskyi (yellow card) 10'; Sivakow (yellow card) 54'; Hordiyenko (yellow card) 81'; Shevchenko (yellow card) 88'	Summary	Belhanda (yellow card) 30'; Danilo Silva (yellow card) 52'; Rybalka (yellow card) 56'; Vitorino Antunes (yellow card) 74'; Khacheridi (yellow card) 90'	Stadium: Slavutych-Arena; Attendance: 6,800; Referee: (Ukraine) Konstantin Trukhanov

13 September 2015 7	Karpaty Lviv	1–1	Zorya Luhansk	Lviv
19:30 EEST (UTC+3)	Chachua (yellow card) 18'; Ksyonz (yellow card) 19'; Khudobyak (yellow card) 32' (yellow-red card) (goal) 66'; Karnoza (yellow card) 36'; Miroshnichenko (yellow card) 56'	Summary	Sivakow (red card) 9'; Karavayev 11'; Hrechyshkin (yellow card) 21'; Petryak (yellow card) 32'; Hordiyenko (yellow card) 43'; Malinovskyi (yellow card) 75'; Ljubenović (yellow card) 90+3'	Stadium: Ukraina Stadium; Attendance: 7,328; Referee: (Ukraine) Anatolii Zhabchenko

20 September 2015 8	Dnipro Dnipropetrovsk	0–3	Zorya Luhansk	Dnipropetrovsk
19:30 EET	Cheberyachko (yellow card) 40'; Rotan (yellow card) 81'	Summary	Hordiyenko 7'; Karavayev 14'; Lipartia 85'; Levchenko (yellow card) 90'	Stadium: Dnipro-Arena; Attendance: 12,713; Referee: (Ukraine) Yury Vaks

27 September 2015 9	Zorya Luhansk	1–1	Oleksandriya	Zaporizhia
17:00 EET	Budkivskyi 26'	Summary	Kolomoyets 72'	Stadium: Slavutych-Arena; Attendance: 1,500; Referee: (Ukraine) Yuriy Mozharovsky

4 October 2015 10	Volyn Lutsk	0–3	Zorya Luhansk	Lutsk
19:30 EET	Bohdanov (yellow card) 52'; Shust (red card) 59'	Summary	Malinovskyi 19'; Budkivskyi 22'; Lipartia 61' (pen.)	Stadium: Avanhard Stadium; Attendance: 5,100; Referee: (Ukraine) Yevhen Aranovsky

18 October 2015 11	Zorya Luhansk	2–1	Hoverla Uzhhorod	Zaporizhia
19:30 EET	Budkivskyi 51'; Kamenyuka 81' (pen.)	Summary	Savchenko (yellow card) 35'; Lyulka (yellow card) 65'; Serhiychuk (yellow card) 74'; Rudko (red card) 80'; Ivanov 86'	Stadium: Slavutych-Arena; Attendance: 1,000; Referee: (Ukraine) Dmytro Kutakov

30 October 2015 13	Zorya Luhansk	1–7	Shakhtar Donetsk	Zaporizhia
19:00 EET	Kamenyuka 67' (pen.); Sivakow (yellow card) 75'	Summary	Fred 40'; Stepanenko 47' (yellow card) 90' (goal) 90+2'; Alex Teixeira 58' 70'; Eduardo 75' 86'	Stadium: Slavutych-Arena; Attendance: 3,500; Referee: (Ukraine) Yury Vaks

7 November 2015 14	Zorya Luhansk	4–1	Metalurh Zaporizhya	Zaporizhia
14:00 EET	Karavayev 5' 90'; Malinovskyi 28' (yellow card) 45+1'; Budkivskyi 59'; Totovytskyi (yellow card) 70'; Hrechyshkin (yellow card) 84'	Summary	Ihnatenko (yellow card) 25'; Demchenko (yellow card) 70'; Zhurakhovskyi 90+3'	Stadium: Slavutych-Arena; Attendance: 1,200; Referee: (Ukraine) Oleksandr Ivanov

22 November 2015 15	Metalist Kharkiv	0–1	Zorya Luhansk	Kharkiv
19:30 EET	Dovhyi (yellow card) 5'; Zubeyko (yellow card) 40'; Rudyka (yellow card) 56' (yellow-red card); Sobol (yellow card) 90+1'	Summary	Hrechyshkin (yellow card) 21'; Kamenyuka (yellow card) 33' (yellow-red card); Petryak (yellow card) 54'; Ljubenović 68' (pen.); Pylyavskyi (yellow card) 77'	Stadium: OSC Metalist; Attendance: 6,180; Referee: (Ukraine) Sergii Boiko

28 November 2015 16	Zorya Luhansk	2–1	Stal Dniprodzerzhynsk	Zaporizhia
13:00 EET	Hordiyenko (yellow card) 41'; Kravchenko 57' (o.g.); Budkivskyi 63'; Opanasenko (yellow card) 70'; Chaykovskyi (yellow card) 75'; Checher (yellow card) 78'; Yarmash (yellow card) 90+3'	Summary	Kulach 12' (yellow card) 74'; Baranovskyi (yellow card) 23'; Budnik (yellow card) 85'	Stadium: Slavutych-Arena; Attendance: 600; Referee: (Ukraine) Mykola Balakin

5 December 2015 12	Vorskla Poltava	0–2	Zorya Luhansk	Poltava
14:00 EET	Siminin (yellow card) 73'	Summary	Hordiyenko (yellow card) 35' (goal) 74'; Budkivskyi 54'; Opansenko (yellow card) 70'; Shevchenko (yellow card) 90+2'	Stadium: Butovskyi Vorskla Stadium; Attendance: 1,500; Referee: (Ukraine) Yevhen Aranovsky

6 March 2016 17	Olimpik Donetsk	1–1	Zorya Luhansk	Kyiv
14:00	Nyemchaninov (yellow card) 50'; Petrov (yellow card) 56'; Fedoriv (yellow card) 66'; Postupalenko 71'; Shestakov (yellow card) 76'; Tanchyk (yellow card) 81'	Summary	Budkivskyi 58'	Stadium: Bannikov Stadium; Attendance: 1,000; Referee: (Ukraine) Sergiy Berezka

12 March 2016 18	Zorya Luhansk	4–0	Chornomorets Odesa	Zaporizhia
17:00	Budkivskyi (yellow card) 45' (goal) 72'; Karavayev 54'; Petryak (yellow card) 58'; Totovytskyi 68'; Ljubenović 83'	Summary	Azatskyi (red card) 5'; Danchenko (yellow card) 56'; Filimonov (yellow card) 70'	Stadium: Slavutych-Arena; Attendance: 1,000; Referee: (Ukraine) Yury Grisjo

20 March 2016 19	Dynamo Kyiv	1–0	Zorya Luhansk	Kyiv
19:30	Harmash (yellow card) 32'; Júnior Moraes 76'; Sydorchuk (yellow card) 90+2'	Summary	Hordiyenko (yellow card) 12'; Tankovskyi (yellow card) 51'; Checher (yellow card) 78'; Karavayev (yellow card) 81'; Petryak (yellow card) 87'; Kamenyuka (yellow card) 90'	Stadium: NSC Olimpiyskiy; Attendance: 6,919; Referee: (Ukraine) Yuriy Mozharovsky

2 April 2016 20	Zorya Luhansk	4–1	Karpaty Lviv	Zaporizhia
17:00	Ljubenović 5' (yellow card) 5'; Budkivskyi 21'; Tankovskyi (yellow card) 38'; Totovytskyi 43'; Chaykovskyi 61'	Summary	Okechukwu 38'; Hitchenko (red card) 44'; Miroshichenko (yellow card) 51' (yellow-red card)	Stadium: Slavutych-Arena; Attendance: 900; Referee: (Ukraine) Yury Vaks

10 April 2016 21	Zorya Luhansk	1–2	Dnipro Dnipropetrovsk	Zaporizhia
19:30	Hordiyenko 63'	Summary	Fedetskyi (yellow card) 20'; Bruno Gama (yellow card) 32'; Laštůvka (yellow card) 65'; Shakhov 75'; Anderson Pico (yellow card) 79' (goal) 86'	Stadium: Slavutych-Arena; Attendance: 5,500; Referee: (Ukraine) Anatoliy Zhabchenko

16 April 2016 22	Oleksandriya	2–0	Zorya Luhansk	Oleksandriya
14:00	Basov (yellow card) 45+1'; Polyarus 48'; Shendrik (yellow card) 62'; Hrytsuk 89'	Summary	Tankovskyi (yellow card) 9'; Rafael Forster (yellow card) 23'	Stadium: CSC Nika Stadium; Attendance: 4,112; Referee: (Ukraine) Kostyantin Trukhanov

23 April 2016 23	Zorya Luhansk	1–1	Volyn Lutsk	Zaporizhia
14:00	Sivakov (yellow card) 67' (yellow card) 83' (red card); Paulinho 71'; Rafael Forster (yellow card) 90+7'	Summary	Kravchenko (yellow card) 15'; Didenko 31'; Goropevšek (red card) 59'; Kvartsyanyi (red card) 60'; Romanyuk (yellow card) 76'; Memeshev (yellow card) 85'; Kohinov (yellow card) 89'; Humenyuk (yellow card) 90+2'; Nedilko (yellow card) 90+5'	Stadium: Slavutych-Arena; Attendance: 1,000; Referee: (Ukraine) Vitaliy Romanov

30 April 2016 24	Hoverla Uzhhorod	0–4	Zorya Luhansk	Uzhhorod
14_00	Savchenko (yellow card) 19'; Havrysh (yellow card) 34'; Toma (yellow card) 43'; Ivanov (yellow card) 49'	Summary	Opanasenko 13'; Budkivskyi 40', 46'; Karavayev 45'	Stadium: Avanhard Stadium; Attendance: 550; Referee: (Ukraine) Ivan Bondar

7 May 2016 25	Zorya Luhansk	1–2	Vorskla Poltava	Zaporizhia
17:00	Budkivskyi 12'; Kamenyuka (yellow card) 77'	Summary	Sapay (yellow card) 28' (yellow card) 86' (red card); Shynder (yellow card) 30' (goal) 85' (pen.); Dytyatev (yellow card) 41'; Khlyobas 46'; Kolomoyets (yellow card) 58'; Sklyar (yellow card) 75'; Chesnakov (yellow card) 77'; Tkachuk (yellow card) 81'	Stadium: Slavutych-Arena; Attendance: 1,000; Referee: (Ukraine) Igor Paskhal

15 May 2016 26	Shakhtar Donetsk	2–3	Zorya Luhansk	Lviv
	Facundo Ferreyra 32'; Wellington Nem (yellow card) 52'; Hladkyi 74'; Rakytskyi (yellow card) 81'	Summary	Ljubenović (yellow card) 47'; Totovytskyi 56', 61', 82'	Stadium: Arena Lviv; Attendance: 6,751; Referee: (Ukraine) Kateryna Monzul

=== Ukrainian Cup ===
==== Qualifying round ====
===== Round of 32 =====
23 August 2015	Krystal Kherson	0–5	Zorya Luhansk	Kherson
17:00 EET		Summary	Khomchenovskyi 21'; Petryak 41'; Hrechyshkin 54'; Tankovskyi 60'; Lipartia 88'	Stadium: Stadion Kherson

===== Round of 16 =====
23 September 2015 First leg	Helios	0–2	Zorya Luhansk	Piatykhaty
19:00 EET	Cherednychenko (yellow card) 32'	Summary	Budkivskyi 34' 37'; Tankovskyi (yellow card) 38'; Opansenko (yellow card) 88'	Stadium: Stadion Sonyachnyj; Attendance: 3,165; Referee: (Ukraine) Andriy Kuzmin

27 October 2015 Second leg	Zorya Luhansk	3–1 (5–1 agg.)	Helios	Zaporizhia
17:00 EET	Budkivskyi 7'; Karavayev 57' 68'; Sivakow (yellow card) 64'	Summary	Serhiy Loboyko (yellow card) 15'; Kravchenko 71'; Mykola Ahapov (yellow card) 76'; Cherednychenko (yellow card) 82'	Stadium: Slavutych-Arena; Attendance: 500; Referee: (Ukraine) Mikhailo Mytrovskyi

===== Quarter finals =====
2 March 2016 First leg	Volyn Lutsk	1–1	Zorya Luhansk	Lutsk
17:00	Bohdanov 18'; Kravchenko (yellow card) 90'	Summary	Kamenyuka (yellow card) 21'; Totovytskyi 23'	Stadium: Avanhard Stadium; Attendance: 3,200; Referee: (Ukraine) Yaroslav Kozyk

6 April 2016 Second leg	Zorya Luhansk	5–0 (6–1 agg.)	Volyn Lutsk	Zaporizhia
14:00	Hordiyenko 22'; Petryak 49'; Opanasenko (yellow card) 71' (goal) 90+1'; Karavayev 78' 87'	Summary	Goropevšek (yellow card) 36' (yellow-red card); Kravchenko (yellow card) 40'; Polyovyi (yellow card) 68'; Žunić (yellow card) 75'; Bohdanov (yellow card) 85' (yellow-red card); Shabanov (yellow card) 90+2'	Stadium: Slavutych-Arena; Attendance: 1,000; Referee: (Ukraine) Kostyantin Trukhanov

===== Semi-finals =====
20 April 2016 First leg	Dnipro Dnipropetrovsk	1–0	Zorya Luhansk	Dnipropetrovsk
19:00	Zozulya 17' (yellow card) 26'; Chyhrynskyi (yellow card) 59'	Summary	Sukhotsyi (yellow card) 38'; Rafael Forster (yellow card) 45+2'; Ljubenović (yellow card) 63' (yellow card) 73' (red card)	Stadium: Dnipro Arena; Attendance: 10,065; Referee: (Ukraine) Yevhen Aranovskyi

11 May 2016 Second leg	Zorya Luhansk	2–0 (2–1 agg.)	Dnipro Dnipropetrovsk	Zaporizhia
17:00	Lipartia 8'; Opanasenko (yellow card) 58'; Sivakov (yellow card) 90+1'; Totovytsky 90+5'	Summary	Skhakhov (yellow card) 44'; Laštůvka (yellow card) 90+5'; Bezus (yellow card) 90+6'	Stadium: Slavutych Arena; Attendance: 5,500; Referee: Anatoliy Abdula

===== Final =====
21 May 2016	Zorya Luhansk	0-2	Shakhtar Donetsk	Lviv
17:00 LST	Rafael Forster (yellow card) 12'; Chaykovskyi (yellow card) 64'; Sivakow (yellow card) 64'; Yarmash (yellow card) 70'	Summary	Hladkyy 42' 57'	Stadium: Arena Lviv; Attendance: 21,720; Referee: (Ukraine) Yevhen Aranovskiy

=== UEFA Europa League ===
==== Qualifying round ====
===== Third qualifying round =====
30 July 2015 First leg	Charleroi (Belgium)	0–2	(Ukraine) Zorya Luhansk	Charleroi, Belgium
20:30 CEST (UTC+2)	N'Ganga (yellow card) 62'; Marinos (yellow card) 90+1'	Summary	Pylyavskyi (yellow card) 30'; Sivakow (yellow card) 59'; Malinovskyi 70', 89'; Chaykovskyi (yellow card) 75'	Stadium: Stade du Pays de Charleroi; Attendance: 9,415; Referee: Radu Petrescu (Romania)

6 August 2015 Second leg	Zorya Luhansk (Ukraine)	3–0 (5–0 agg.)	(Belgium) Charleroi	Kyiv, Ukraine
20:00 EEST (UTC+3)	Kamenyuka (yellow card) 28'; Chaykovskyi (yellow card) 40'; Ljubenović 58', 68' (pen.); Malinovskyi 90+3'	Summary	Deweast (yellow card) 42'; Marcq (yellow card) 67'	Stadium: Valeriy Lobanovskyi Dynamo Stadium; Attendance: 4,000; Referee: Andris Treimanis (Latvia)

===== Play-off round =====
20 August 2015 First leg	Zorya Luhansk (Ukraine)	0–1	(Poland) Legia Warsaw	Kyiv, Ukraine
20:00 EEST (UTC+3)	Chaykovskyi (yellow card) 30'; Ljubenović (yellow card) 57'; Hordiyenko (yellow card) 61'; Sivakow (yellow card) 90'	Summary	Guilherme (yellow card) 8'; Kucharczyk 48'; Jodłowiec (yellow card) 72'	Stadium: Valeriy Lobanovskyi Dynamo Stadium; Attendance: 16,000; Referee: (Greece) Anastasios Sidiropoulos

27 August 2015 Second leg	Legia Warsaw (Poland)	3–2 (4–2 agg.)	(Ukraine) Zorya Luhansk	Warsaw, Poland
21:00 CEST (UTC+2)	Pazdan (yellow card) 2'; Brzyski 16'; Guilherme 62'; Rzeźniczak (yellow card) 65'; Duda (yellow card) 90+4' (goal) 90+5' (pen.)	Summary	Kamenyuka (yellow card) 37'; Khomchenovskyi 39'; Sivakow (yellow card) 45+2'; Malinovskyi 66'; Budkivskyi (yellow card) 79'; Opanasenko (yellow card) 90+4'	Stadium: Polish Army Stadium; Attendance: 23,163; Referee: (Germany) Tobias Welz
