= 2015–16 Ukrainian Cup =

2015–2016 Ukrainian Cup
Kubok Ukrainy

Tournament details
- Country: Ukraine
- Dates: 22 July 2015 – 21 May 2016; 22 July 2015 (preliminary round); 21 August 2015 – 21 May 2016 (main event)
- Teams: 45

Final positions
- Champions: Shakhtar Donetsk (10th title)
- Runners-up: Zorya Luhansk
- Semifinalists: Dnipro Dnipropetrovsk; FC Oleksandriya
- UEFA Europa League: none (Note: the winner qualified for the UEFA Champions League)

Tournament statistics
- Matches played: 58
- Goals scored: 163 (2.81 per match)
- Top goal scorer(s): 4–Andriy Yarmolenko (Dynamo) & Oleksandr Karavayev (Zorya)

The 2015–16 Ukrainian Cup was the 25th annual season of Ukraine's football knockout competition. The schedule of games for clubs from the First and Second League was confirmed on 3 July 2015 at a session of the Central Council of the Professional Football League of Ukraine.

== Format ==
Starting with Round of 32 teams were divided equally on seeded and unseeded in relation to the current rating of teams before the start of each stage. Seeded teams are teams that are located in the upper half of the rating, unseeded–in the lower.

Round of 16, quarterfinals and semifinals consist of two legs.

Starting with the Round of 16 and to semifinals, the host teams in the first leg is unseeded team, while in the second leg–seeded.

== Team allocation ==
The competition included all professional first teams from the Premier League (14/14 teams of the league), First League (15/16), Second League (14/14) and two best teams from the previous year's Amateur Cup. A reserve team (Dynamo-2) from the First League was included in the draw.

=== Distribution ===
Preliminary round (26 teams)	10 entrants from the First League; 14 entrants from the Second League; 2 entrants from the Amateur Cup	
Round of 32 (32 teams)	14 entrants from the Premier League; 5 entrants from the First League	13 winners from the Preliminary round

=== Round and draw dates ===
Phase	Round	Draw date	Game date
Qualifying	Round of 64	3 July 2015	22 July 2015
Main event	Round of 32	29 July 2015	22 August 2015
Main event	Round of 16	28 August 2015	First leg: 23 September 2015
Main event	Round of 16	28 August 2015	Second leg: 28 October 2015
Main event	Quarter-finals	30 October 2015	First leg: 2 March 2016
Main event	Quarter-finals	30 October 2015	Second leg: TBD
Main event	Semi-finals	8 April 2016	First leg: 20 April 2016
Main event	Semi-finals	8 April 2016	Second leg: 11 May 2016
Main event	Final	21 May 2016	

=== Teams ===
Enter in Preliminary Round			Enter in Round of 32	
AAFU; 2 teams	PFL League 2; 14/14 teams	PFL League 1; 10/16 teams	PFL League 1; 5/16 teams	UPL; 14/14 teams
Balkany Zorya*; SCC Demnya	Arsenal-Kyiv*; Arsenal-Kyivshchyna; Barsa Sumy*; Bukovyna Chernivtsi; Enerhiya Nova Kakhovka; Inhulets Petrove*; Kolos Kovalivka*; Kremin Kremenchuk; Krystal Kherson; Myr Hornostayivka*; Nikopol-NPHU; Real Pharma Odesa; Skala Stryi; Veres Rivne*	Avanhard Kramatorsk; Cherkaskyi Dnipro; Hirnyk Kryvyi Rih; MFC Mykolaiv; Naftovyk-Ukrnafta; Nyva Ternopil; Obolon-Brovar Kyiv; FC Poltava; PFC Sumy; FC Ternopil	Desna Chernihiv; Helios Kharkiv; Hirnyk-Sport; Illichivets Mariupol; Zirka Kropyvnytskyi	Chornomorets Odesa; Dnipro Dnipropetrovsk; Dynamo Kyiv; Hoverla Uzhhorod; Karpaty Lviv; Metalist Kharkiv; Metalurh Zaporizhia; FC Oleksandriya; Olimpik Donetsk; Shakhtar Donetsk; Stal Dniprodzerzhynsk; Volyn Lutsk; Vorskla Poltava; Zorya Luhansk

Notes:

- With the asterisk (*) are noted the Second League teams that were recently admitted to the league from amateurs and the AAFU (amateur) team(s) that qualified in place of the Amateur Cup finalist(s).
- The reserve teams are not allowed to compete and two members of the 2015–16 Ukrainian First League: Dynamo-2 Kyiv were not included in the premier cup competition.
- Balkany Zorya was selected as one of better losing quarterfinalists since the other finalist and losing semifinalists qualified by being admitted to the Second League.

== Bracket ==
The following is the bracket that demonstrates the last four rounds of the Ukrainian Cup, including the final match. Numbers in parentheses next to the match score represent the results of a penalty shoot-out.

Round of 32
Inhulets Petrove	0
Volyn Lutsk	2
MFC Mykolaiv	2
Metalist Kharkiv	1
Helios Kharkiv	1
Hoverla Uzhhorod	0
Krystal Kherson	0
Zorya Luhansk	5
Balkany Zorya	0
Dnipro Dnipropetrovsk	1
Naftovyk-Ukrnafta Okhtyrka	0
Olimpik Donetsk	2
Cherkaskyi Dnipro	1
Stal Dniprodzerzhynsk	3
Hirnyk Kryvyi Rih	3
Illichivets Mariupol	0
Zirka Kirovohrad (p)	1 (5)
Karpaty Lviv	1 (4)
Avanhard Kramatorsk	1
FC Oleksandriya	3
Hirnyk-Sport Komsomolsk	0
Dynamo Kyiv	6
FC Sumy	0
Obolon-Brovar Kyiv	1
Myr Hornostaivka	0
Chornomorets Odesa	2
Desna Chernihiv	1 (2)
Vorskla Poltava (p)	1 (4)
Arsenal-Kyiv	0
Shakhtar Donetsk	3
FC Ternopil	3
Metalurh Zaporizhia	1

Round of 16
MFC Mykolaiv	0	0	0
Volyn Lutsk	2	5	7
Helios Kharkiv	0	1	1
Zorya Luhansk	2	3	5
Olimpik Donetsk	0	2	2
Dnipro Dnipropetrovsk	2	3	5
Hirnyk Kryvyi Rih	1	1	2
Stal Dniprodzerzhynsk	1	2	3
Zirka Kirovohrad	1	0	1
FC Oleksandriya	1	2	3
Obolon-Brovar Kyiv	0	0	0
Dynamo Kyiv	2	5	7
Chornomorets Odesa	0	0	0
Vorskla Poltava	1	0	1
FC Ternopil	0	0	0
Shakhtar Donetsk	5	4	9

Quarter-finals
Volyn Lutsk	1	0	1
Zorya Luhansk	1	5	6
Stal Dniprodzerzhynsk	0	1	1
Dnipro Dnipropetrovsk	3	4	7
Dynamo Kyiv	1	0	1
FC Oleksandriya	1	1	2
Vorskla Poltava	0	2	2
Shakhtar Donetsk	4	1	5

Semi-finals
Dnipro Dnipropetrovsk	1	0	1
Zorya Luhansk	0	2	2
FC Oleksandriya	1	0	1
Shakhtar Donetsk	1	2	3

Final
21 May – Lviv
Zorya Luhansk	0
Shakhtar Donetsk	2

== Competition schedule ==
=== Preliminary round (1/32) ===
In this round entered 10 clubs from the First League, 14 clubs from the Second League and two representatives from the 2014 Ukrainian Amateur Cup. The round matches were played on 22 July 2015.

22 July 2015	Arsenal-Kyivshchyna Bila Tserkva (2L)	0–2	(1L) Obolon-Brovar Kyiv	Bila Tserkva, Kyiv Oblast
17:30		Report	Prodan 16'; Favorov 62'	Stadium: Trudovi Rezervy; Attendance: 1,500; Referee: Viktor Kopiyevskyi (Kirovohrad)

22 July 2015	Arsenal Kyiv (2L)	1–0	(2L) Veres Rivne	Boryspil, Kyiv Oblast
18:00	Tymenko 27' (pen.)	Report		Stadium: Kolos; Attendance: 1,000; Referee: Oleksandr Shandor (Lviv)

22 July 2015	Kremin Kremenchuk (2L)	0–4	(1L) Cherkaskyi Dnipro	Kremenchuk, Poltava Oblast
18:00		Report	Medynskyi 37', 57'; Tymenko 71'; Skepskyi 80' (pen.)	Stadium: Kremin Arena; Attendance: 1,500; Referee: Andriy Kuzmin (Mykolaiv)

22 July 2015	Real Pharma Odesa (2L)	0–0 (a.e.t.) (4–5 p)	(2L) Krystal Kherson	Odesa
17:00		Report		Stadium: Ivan; Attendance: 250; Referee: Oleh Derevinskyi (Kyiv)
	Penalties
	Babentsov (penalty missed); Nesterenko (penalty missed); Heorhiyev (penalty missed); Bychkov (penalty scored); Shestakov (penalty scored); Malysh (penalty scored); Dubina (penalty scored)		(penalty missed) Lenskyi; (penalty missed) Bichevoy; (penalty scored) Tsoy; (penalty scored) Kozachenko; (penalty scored) Kasperovych; (penalty scored) Barladym; (penalty scored) Berest

22 July 2015	FC Nikopol-NPHU (2L)	1–3	(1L) FC Ternopil	Nikopol, Dnipropetrovsk Oblast
18:00	Bohdanov 31'; Pirkavets (yellow card) 42' (yellow-red card) 60'	Report	Kurylo 21'; B.Semenets 30', 81'	Stadium: Elektrometalurh; Attendance: 1,520; Referee: Maksym Kozyriatskyi (Zaporizhia)

22 July 2015	Naftovyk-Ukrnafta Okhtyrka (1L)	3–1	(1L) Nyva Ternopil	Okhtyrka, Sumy Oblast
18:00	Prokuror (yellow card) 5' (yellow-red card) 49'; Lystopad 15'; Vechtomov 30'; Prokuror 48' (pen.)	Report	Kerchu (yellow card) 7' (yellow-red card) 42'; Petrivskyi 76'	Stadium: Naftovyk; Attendance: 1,100; Referee: Mykola Kryvonosov (Kyiv)

22 July 2015	Kolos Kovalivka (2L)	1–3	(1L) FC Sumy	Kovalivka, Kyiv Oblast
18:00	Morozko 62'	Report	Brikner 20'; Bohachov 34'; Lebedenko 90+1' (pen.)	Stadium: Kolos; Attendance: 900; Referee: Roman Kalyta (Mykolaiv)

22 July 2015	Avanhard Kramatorsk (1L)	2–1	(1L) FC Poltava	Kramatorsk, Donetsk Oblast
17:30	Filippov 9'; Fatiy 66'	Report	Ivanov 64'	Stadium: Avanhard (Prapor); Attendance: 3,000; Referee: Volodymyr Novokhatniy (Kyiv)

22 July 2015	Bukovyna Chernivtsi (2L)	0–0 (a.e.t.) (4–5 p)	(1L) MFC Mykolaiv	Chernivtsi
18:00		Report		Stadium: Bukovyna; Attendance: 1,200; Referee: Mykhailo Mytrovskyi (Uzhhorod)
	Penalties
	Lutsyuk (penalty missed); Makoviychuk (penalty scored); Temerivskyi (penalty scored); Ryashko (penalty scored); Rafalskyi (penalty scored)		(penalty scored) Berko; (penalty scored) Sikorskyi; (penalty scored) Tsapiy; (penalty scored) Chuchman; (penalty scored) Batyushyn

22 July 2015	SCC Demnya (AM)	1–2 (a.e.t.)	(2L) Inhulets Petrove	Demnya, Lviv Oblast
18:00	Demkiv 97'	Report	Mishurenko 93'; Kolyesnikov 110'	Stadium: imeni Kuziva; Attendance: 1,000; Referee: Yevhen Aranovskyi (Kyiv)

22 July 2015	Myr Hornostayivka (2L)	6–0	(2L) Barsa Sumy	Hornostaivka, Kherson Oblast
18:00	Falkovskyi 3'; Komyahin 15', 26', 90+3'; Holovko 23'; Petrychenko 44'	Report		Stadium: Zatys; Attendance: 450; Referee: Denys Reznikov (Dniprodzerzhynsk)

22 July 2015	Balkany Zorya^{(1)} (AM)	2–1	(2L) Skala Stryi	Zorya, Odesa Oblast
18:00	M.Zlatov 38'; Havrylyuk 78'	Report	Tsyutsyura 35' (pen.)	Stadium: imeni Tropantsia; Attendance: 1,500; Referee: Oleksandr Moskalenko (Kyiv)

22 July 2015	Enerhiya Nova Kakhovka (2L)	0–4	(1L) Hirnyk Kryvyi Rih	Nova Kakhovka, Kherson Oblast
18:00		Report	Pavlov 27'; Sitalo 43'; Yampol 54'; Bayenko 71'	Stadium: Enerhiya; Attendance: 500; Referee: Oleksiy Drachov (Chernihiv)

Notes:

- ^(1) The competition allows for the finalists of the Ukrainian Amateur Cup. However the winner of the 2014 Ukrainian Amateur Cup, AF Piatykhatska Volodymyrivka (renamed as FC Inhulets Petrove) joined the PFL. Hence the PFL replaced their vacated spot with the highest ranked team. Since both of the semi-finalists of the Amateur Cup also joined the PFL, of the remaining quarter-finalists, Balkany Zorya was the highest ranked team.

=== Round of 32 ===
In this round all 14 teams from the 2014–15 Ukrainian Premier League, 5 highest ranking clubs from 2014–15 Ukrainian First League and 13 winners from the Preliminary round enter this stage of the competition which also includes 8 teams from the 2014–15 Ukrainian First League, 4 teams from the 2014–15 Ukrainian Second League and last season's Ukrainian Amateur Cup quarter-finalist. The draw for this round was held on 29 July 2015 at the House of Football in Kyiv.

21 August 2015	Cherkaskyi Dnipro (1L)	1–3	(PL) Stal Dniprodzerzhynsk	Cherkasy
18:00	Batalskyi 83'	Report	Kozak 21'; Burlin 53' (o.g.); Kulach 69'	Stadium: Tsentralnyi Stadion; Attendance: 3,650; Referee: Serhiy Dankovskyi

22 August 2015	Balkany Zorya (AM)	0–1	(PL) Dnipro Dnipropetrovsk	Zorya, Odesa Oblast
14:00		Report	Rotan 84'	Stadium: B. Y. Tropanets Stadium; Attendance: 10,000; Referee: Volodymyr Milanych

22 August 2015	Zirka Kirovohrad (1L)	1–1 (a.e.t.) (5–4 p)	(PL) Karpaty Lviv	Kirovohrad
16:00	Zahalskyi 70' (pen.)	Report	Chachua 50'	Stadium: Zirka Stadium; Attendance: 5,200; Referee: Mykhailo Mytrovskyi
	Penalties
	Loktionov (penalty scored); Kucherenko (penalty scored); Kovalyov (penalty scored); Dopilka (penalty scored); Kavatsiv (penalty scored)		Karnoza (penalty scored); Daushvili (penalty missed); Holodyuk (penalty scored); Khudobyak (penalty scored); Kravets (penalty scored)

22 August 2015	Hirnyk-Sport Komsomolsk (1L)	0–6	(PL) Dynamo Kyiv	Komsomolsk, Poltava Oblast
17:00		Report	Kravets 26'; Yarmolenko 39', 65', 76'; Veloso 56'; Antunes 67'	Stadium: Yunist Stadium; Attendance: 3,000; Referee: Andriy Yabonskyi

22 August 2015	Inhulets Petrove (2L)	0–2	(PL) Volyn Lutsk	Petrove, Kirovohrad Oblast
17:00		Report	Matei 26', 80' (pen.)	Stadium: Inhulets Stadium; Attendance: 1,720; Referee: Oleksandr Pavlyuk

22 August 2015	Hirnyk Kryvyi Rih (1L)	3–0	(1L) Illichivets Mariupol	Kryvyi Rih, Dnipropetrovsk Oblast
17:00	Sitalo 2'; Borovskyi 69', 81'	Report		Stadium: Metalurh Stadium; Attendance: 4,000; Referee: Roman Kalyta

22 August 2015	Arsenal Kyiv (2L)	0–3	(PL) Shakhtar Donetsk	Kyiv
17:00		Report	Malyshev 23'; Eduardo 41'; Hryn 75'	Stadium: V. Bannikov Stadium; Attendance: 1,500; Referee: Andriy Kuzmin

22 August 2015	MFC Mykolaiv (1L)	2–1	(PL) Metalist Kharkiv	Mykolaiv
17:00	Batyushyn 28', 79'	Report	Lyopa 30'	Stadium: Tsentralnyi Stadion; Attendance: 10,000; Referee: Vadym Sayik

22 August 2015	FC Sumy (1L)	0–1	(1L) Obolon-Brovar Kyiv	Sumy
17:00		Report	Shevchuk 46'	Stadium: Yuvileiny Stadium; Attendance: 1,789; Referee: Dmytro Kryvushkin

22 August 2015	Myr Hornostayivka (2L)	0–2	(PL) Chornomorets Odesa	Hornostaivka, Kherson Oblast
17:00		Report	Slinkin 29'; Kovalets 74'	Stadium: Zatys Stadium; Attendance: 1,250; Referee: Yuriy Ivanov

22 August 2015	Desna Chernihiv (1L)	1–1 (a.e.t.) (2–4 p)	(PL) Vorskla Poltava	Chernihiv
17:00	Kondratyuk 57'	Report	Shynder 18'	Stadium: Yuri Gagarin Stadium; Attendance: 4,800; Referee: Maksym Kozyriatskyi
	Penalties
	Chepurnenko (penalty scored); Kondratyuk (penalty missed); Chulanov (penalty missed); Kravchenko (penalty scored)		Tkachuk (penalty scored); Chesnakov (penalty scored); Dytyatev (penalty scored); Sklyar (penalty scored)

22 August 2015	Avanhard Kramatorsk (1L)	1–3	(PL) FC Oleksandriya	Kramatorsk, Donetsk Oblast
17:30	Filippov 35'	Report	Polyarus 25'; Stepanyuk 32'; Chaus 47' (o.g.)	Stadium: Avanhard Stadium; Attendance: 1,200; Referee: Serhiy Skrypak

22 August 2015	FC Ternopil (1L)	3–1	(PL) Metalurh Zaporizhya	Ternopil
18:00	Polyanchuk 3'; Kurylo 62'; Bohdanov 67'	Report	Zhurakhovskyi 45'	Stadium: City Stadium; Attendance: 3,000; Referee: Pavlo Chyzhevskyi

22 August 2015	Naftovyk-Ukrnafta Okhtyrka (1L)	0–2	(PL) Olimpik Donetsk	Okhtyrka, Sumy Oblast
18:30		Report	Drachenko 6'; Postupalenko 90+2'	Stadium: Naftovyk Stadium; Attendance: 2,500; Referee: Denys Shurman

22 August 2015	Helios Kharkiv (1L)	1–0	(PL) Hoverla Uzhhorod	Kharkiv
19:00	Cherednichenko 90+4'	Report		Stadium: Sonyachny Training Center; Attendance: 3,000; Referee: Yuriy Foshchiy

23 August 2015	Krystal Kherson (2L)	0–5	(PL) Zorya Luhansk	Kherson
17:00		Report	Khomchenovskyi 21'; Petryak 41'; Hrechyshkin 54'; Tankovskyi 63'; Lipartia 88'	Stadium: Krystal Stadium; Attendance: 5,155; Referee: Volodymyr Novokhatniy

=== Round of 16 ===
Ten teams from the Ukrainian Premier League and six teams from the Ukrainian First League qualified for the round. The draw for this round was held on 28 August 2015 at the House of Football in Kyiv. The round matches were played on 23 September and 27, 28 October 2015.

==== First leg ====
23 September 2015	MFC Mykolaiv (1L)	0–2	(PL) Volyn Lutsk	Mykolaiv
16:00		Report	Kozban 75'; Memeshev 90'	Stadium: Tsentralnyi Stadion; Attendance: 8,907; Referee: Serhiy Dankovskyi

23 September 2015	Hirnyk Kryvyi Rih (1L)	1–1	(PL) Stal Dniprodzerzhynsk	Kryvyi Rih, Dnipropetrovsk Oblast
16:00	Hryhoryk 22'	Report	Kravchenko 68'	Stadium: Metalurh Stadium; Attendance: 4,000; Referee: Mykola Kryvonosov

23 September 2015	Olimpik Donetsk (PL)	0–2	(PL) Dnipro Dnipropetrovsk	Kyiv
17:00		Report	Selezniov 16'; Babatunde 90+2'	Stadium: Bannikov Stadium; Attendance: 600; Referee: Ihor Paskhal

23 September 2015	FC Ternopil (1L)	0–5	(PL) Shakhtar Donetsk	Ternopil
18:00		Report	Malyshev 35'; Bernard 47', 61'; Boryachuk 76'; Kovalenko 77'	Stadium: City Stadium; Attendance: 15,500; Referee: Yuriy Foshchiy

23 September 2015	Zirka Kirovohrad (1L)	1–1	(PL) FC Oleksandriya	Kirovohrad
18:00	Kucherenko 12' (pen.)	Report	Targamadze 43'	Stadium: Zirka Stadium; Attendance: 7,230; Referee: Mykhailo Mytrovskyi

23 September 2015	Chornomorets Odesa (PL)	0–1	(PL) Vorskla Poltava	Odesa
19:00		Report	Bartulović 39'	Stadium: Chornomorets Stadium; Attendance: 3,820; Referee: Oleksandr Ivanov

23 September 2015	Helios Kharkiv (1L)	0–2	(PL) Zorya Luhansk	Kharkiv
19:00		Report	Budkivskyi 34', 37'	Stadium: OSC Metalist^{(2)} Attendance: 3,165; Referee: Andriy Kuzmin

23 September 2015	Obolon-Brovar Kyiv (1L)	0–2	(PL) Dynamo Kyiv	Kyiv
19:30		Report	Kovalenko 27' (o.g.); Moraes 73'	Stadium: Obolon Arena; Attendance: 5,100; Referee: Serhiy Skrypak

Notes:

- ^(2) Football Federation of Ukraine allows Helios Kharkiv to move their match venue to the larger OSC Metalist stadium.

==== Second leg ====
The dates for the second leg matches were announced on October 13.

27 October 2015	Shakhtar Donetsk (PL)	4–0	(1L) FC Ternopil	Kyiv
14:00	Ferreyra 5' (pen.); Kobin 33'; Boryachuk 67'; Taison 89' (pen.)	Report		Stadium: Obolon Arena^{(3)} Attendance: 1,200; Referee: Denys Shurman

Shakhtar won 9–0 on aggregate.

27 October 2015	Zorya Luhansk (PL)	3–1	(1L) Helios Kharkiv	Zaporizhia
17:00	Budkivskyi 7'; Karavayev 57', 68'	Report	Kravchenko 71'	Stadium: Slavutych-Arena; Attendance: 500; Referee: Mykhailo Mytrovskyi

Zorya won 5–1 on aggregate.

27 October 2015	Dynamo Kyiv (PL)	5–0	(1L) Obolon-Brovar Kyiv	Kyiv
19:00	Harmash 5', 32'; Husiev 66', 69'; Teodorczyk 80'	Report		Stadium: NSC Olimpiyskiy; Attendance: 6,758; Referee: Mykola Balakin

Dynamo won 7–0 on aggregate.

27 October 2015	Vorskla Poltava (PL)	0–0	(PL) Chornomorets Odesa	Poltava
19:30		Report		Stadium: Vorskla Stadium; Attendance: 4,500; Referee: Serhiy Skrypak

Vorskla won 1–0 on aggregate.

28 October 2015	Stal Dniprodzerzhynsk (PL)	2–1	(1L) Hirnyk Kryvyi Rih	Dnipropetrovsk
14:00	Adamyuk 25'; Kotlyar 80' (pen.)	Report	Ryabov 64'	Stadium: Meteor Stadium; Attendance: 500; Referee: Andriy Kuzmin

Stal won 3–2 on aggregate.

28 October 2015	Volyn Lutsk (PL)	5–0	(1L) MFC Mykolaiv	Lutsk
17:00	Kobakhidze 27', 82'; Kravchenko 34'; Kozban 46'; Didenko 90+3'	Report		Stadium: Avanhard Stadium; Attendance: 1,800; Referee: Mykola Kryvonosov

Volyn won 7–0 on aggregate.

28 October 2015	FC Oleksandriya (PL)	2–0	(1L) Zirka Kirovohrad	Oleksandriya, Kirovohrad Oblast
17:00	Kozak 12', 38'	Report		Stadium: CSC Nika Stadium; Attendance: 3,400; Referee: Yuriy Foshchiy

FC Oleksandriya won 3–1 on aggregate.

28 October 2015	Dnipro Dnipropetrovsk (PL)	3–2	(PL) Olimpik Donetsk	Dnipropetrovsk
19:00	Gama 33'; Babatunde 88'; Zozulya 90+4'	Report	Lysenko 74'; Shestakov 75'	Stadium: Dnipro-Arena; Attendance: 5,026; Referee: Andriy Yabolonskyi

Dnipro won 5–2 on aggregate.

Notes:

- ^(3) Originally the match was to be held at Bannikov Stadium but the FFU moved the match to Obolon Arena.

=== Quarterfinals ===
Eight teams from the Ukrainian Premier League qualified for the round. The draw for this round was held on 30 October 2015 at the Premier-Liha office. Originally the First Leg matches were scheduled for 3 December but the Premier League rescheduled the matches to be played in the spring (2016).

==== First leg ====
1 March 2016	Stal Dniprodzerzhynsk (PL)	0–3	(PL) Dnipro Dnipropetrovsk	Dnipropetrovsk
17:00		Report	Matheus 32' (pen.); Gama 70'; Léo Matos 90+2'	Stadium: Meteor Stadium; Attendance: 6,000; Referee: Yevhen Aranovskyi

1 March 2016	Dynamo Kyiv (PL)	1–1	(PL) FC Oleksandriya	Kyiv
19:00	Yarmolenko 67'	Report	Basov 30'	Stadium: NSC Olimpiyskiy^{(4)} Attendance: 3,554; Referee: Yuriy Morzhanovskyi

2 March 2016	Volyn Lutsk (PL)	1–1	(PL) Zorya Luhansk	Lutsk
19:00	Bohdanov 18'	Report	Totovytskyi 25'	Stadium: Avanhard Stadium; Attendance: 3,200; Referee: Yaroslav Kozyk

2 March 2016	Vorskla Poltava (PL)	0–4	(PL) Shakhtar Donetsk	Poltava
19:30		Report	Kovalenko 4'; Ferreyra 55'; Kucher 58'; Nem 80'	Stadium: Butovsky Vorskla Stadium; Attendance: 7,000; Referee: Anatoliy Abdula

==== Second leg ====
The dates for the second leg matches were announced on March 18.

27 March 2016	Shakhtar Donetsk (PL)	1–2	(PL) Vorskla Poltava	Kyiv
17:00	Bernard 67' (pen.)	Report	Khlyobas 28', 88'	Stadium: Obolon Stadium; Attendance: 2,182; Referee: Yuriy Vaks

Shakhtar won 5–2 on aggregate.

6 April 2016	Zorya Luhansk (PL)	5–0	(PL) Volyn Lutsk	Zaporizhia
14:00	Hordiyenko 21'; Petryak 50'; Karavayev 77', 87'; Opanasenko 90+1'	Report		Stadium: Slavutych Arena; Attendance: 1,000; Referee: Kostiantyn Trukhanov

Zorya won 6–1 on aggregate.

6 April 2016	FC Oleksandriya (PL)	1–0	(PL) Dynamo Kyiv	Oleksandriya, Kirovohrad Oblast
17:00	Chorniy 24'	Report		Stadium: CSC Nika; Attendance: 6,800; Referee: Oleksandr Derdo

Oleksandriya won 2–1 on aggregate.

6 April 2016	Dnipro Dnipropetrovsk (PL)	4–1	(PL) Stal Dniprodzerzhynsk	Dnipropetrovsk
19:00	Leo Matos 29'; Matheus 48', 61'; Luchkevych 64'	Report	Vasin 86'	Stadium: Dnipro Arena; Attendance: 5,216; Referee: Ihor Paskhal

Dnipro won 7–1 on aggregate.

Notes:

- ^(4) Change of venue for the first leg as management of both sides agreed to play the first leg in Kyiv due to the pitch in Oleksandriya in early spring.

=== Semifinals ===
All four teams that qualified for the round are from the Ukrainian Premier League. The draw for this round was held on 8 April 2016 at the House of Football. During the draw there was identified a host for the final whom will be the winner of Dnipro-Zorya pair.

==== First leg ====
20 April 2016	FC Oleksandriya (PL)	1–1	(PL) Shakhtar Donetsk	Oleksandriya, Kirovohrad Oblast
19:00	Hrytsuk 36'	Report	Eduardo 54'	Stadium: CSC Nika; Attendance: 6,735; Referee: Anatoliy Zhabchenko

20 April 2016	Dnipro Dnipropetrovsk (PL)	1–0	(PL) Zorya Luhansk	Dnipropetrovsk
19:00	Zozulya 17'	Report		Stadium: Dnipro Arena; Attendance: 10,065; Referee: Yevhen Aranovskyi

==== Second leg ====
11 May 2016	Zorya Luhansk (PL)	2–0	(PL) Dnipro Dnipropetrovsk	Zaporizhia
17:00	Lipartia 8'; Totovytsky 90+5'	Report		Stadium: Slavutych Arena; Attendance: 5,500; Referee: Anatoliy Abdula

Zorya won 2–1 on aggregate.

11 May 2016	Shakhtar Donetsk (PL)	2–0	(PL) FC Oleksandriya	Lviv
19:30	Malyshev 15'; Nem 90+2'	Report		Stadium: Arena Lviv; Attendance: 1,750; Referee: Kostyantyn Trukhanov

Shakhtar won 3–1 on aggregate.

=== Final ===
21 May 2016	Zorya Luhansk (PL)	0–2	(PL) Shakhtar Donetsk	Arena Lviv, Lviv
17:00 LST		Report	Hladkyy 42', 57'	Attendance: 21,720; Referee: Yevhen Aranovskiy

== Top goalscorers ==
The competition's top ten goalscorers including qualification rounds.

As of 11 May 2016

Rank	Scorer	Goals (Pen.)	Team
1	(Ukraine) Oleksandr Karavayev	4	Zorya Luhansk
1	(Ukraine) Andriy Yarmolenko	4	Dynamo Kyiv
3	(Brazil) Bernard	3	Shakhtar Donetsk
3	(Ukraine) Pylyp Budkivskyi	3	Zorya Luhansk
3	(Ukraine) Yuriy Komyahin	3	Myr Hornostayivka
3	(Ukraine) Maksym Malyshev	3	Shakhtar Donetsk
3	(Ukraine) Andriy Totovytskyi	3	Zorya Luhansk
3	(Brazil) Matheus Leite Nascimento	3 (1)	Dnipro Dnipropetrovsk

== See also ==
- 2015–16 Ukrainian Premier League
- 2015–16 Ukrainian First League
- 2015–16 Ukrainian Second League
- 2015–16 UEFA Europa League
