= 2014 Ukrainian Amateur Cup =

2014 Ukrainian Cup among amateurs
Tournament details
- Country: Ukraine
- Dates: 13 August – 9 November
- Teams: 23

Final positions
- Champions: AF Piatykhatska Volodymyrivka
- Runners-up: SCC Demnya
- Ukrainian Cup: SCC Demnya, Balkany Zorya

The 2014 Ukrainian Amateur Cup was the nineteenth annual season of Ukraine's football knockout competition for amateur football teams. The start of the competition was announced on 11 August 2014. The competition (first games) began on 13 August 2014 and concluded on 9 November 2014.

The cup holders Chaika Petropavlivska Borshchahivka did not participate.

AF Piatykhatska Volodymyrivka won the Ukrainian Cup trophy, when they beat SCC Demnya on aggregate 3-1. Both teams qualified for the 2015–16 Ukrainian Cup. Later, since 3 out of 4 semifinalists qualified to the 2015–16 Ukrainian Cup by being admitted to the 2015–16 Ukrainian Second League, the second berth was awarded to one of the quarterfinalists Balkany Zorya.

== Participated clubs ==
In bold are clubs that were active at the same season AAFU championship (parallel round-robin competition).

- Cherkasy Oblast: **Zorya Biloziria**
- Chernihiv Oblast: **Yednist Plysky**
- Chernivtsi Oblast: Zarinok Tysovets
- Dnipropetrovsk Oblast (2): Olimpik Petrykivka, **VPK-Ahro Shevchenkivka**
- Kharkiv Oblast: Kolos Zachepylivka
- Kherson Oblast: **Myr Hornostaivka**
- Khmelnytskyi Oblast: Zbruch Volochysk
- Kirovohrad Oblast: **AF Pyatykhatska Volodymyrivka**
- Kyiv and Kyiv Oblast (3): Arsenal-Kyiv Kyiv, **Kolos Kovalivka**, Yevrobis-Ahrobiznes Kyiv
- Lviv Oblast: SCC Demnya
- Mykolaiv Oblast (2): MFC Pervomaisk, **Torpedo Mykolaiv**
- Odesa Oblast: **Balkany Zorya**
- Rivne Oblast (3): Izotop-RAES Kuznetsovsk, FC Malynsk, **ODEK Orzhiv**
- Vinnytsia Oblast: **FC Vinnytsia**
- Zaporizhia Oblast: Tavria-Skif Rozdol
- Zhytomyr Oblast (2): Avanhard Novohrad-Volynskyi, FC Korosten

== Bracket ==
The following is the bracket that demonstrates the last four rounds of the Ukrainian Cup, including the final match. Numbers in parentheses next to the match score represent the results of a penalty shoot-out.

Round of 16
Yevrobis-Ahrobiznes Kyiv	0	-	-
**ODEK Orzhiv**	**2**	+	+
Zbruch Volochysk	0	**1**	1
**SCC Demnya**	**2**	0	**2**
**Yednist Plysky**	**2**	**1**	**3**
Avanhard Novohrad-Volynsky	0	0	0
FC Korosten	1	1	2
**Kolos Kovalivka**	**3**	1	**4**
**AF Piatykhatska Volodymyrivka**	**6**	**7**	**13**
Torpedo Mykolaiv	2	1	3
Olimpik Petrykivka	1	2	3
**Zorya Biloziria**	1	**5**	**6**
**Balkany Zorya**	**3**	**4**	**7**
MFC Pervomaisk	1	0	1
VPK-Ahro Shevchenkivka	**1**	0	1
**Myr Hornostayivka**	0	**2**	**2**

Quarter-finals
ODEK Orzhiv	0	0	0
**SCC Demnya**	0	**1**	**1**
Yednist Plysky	0	1	1
**Kolos Kovalivka**	**1**	**4**	**5**
**AF Piatykhatska Volodymyrivka**	**3**	2	**5**
Zorya Biloziria	0	**3**	3
Balkany Zorya	0	**1**	1
**Myr Hornostayivka**	**2**	0	**2**

Semi-finals
**SCC Demnya**	**1**	0	**1**
Kolos Kovalivka	0	0	0
**AF Piatykhatska Volodymyrivka**	0	**1**	**1**
Myr Hornostayivka	0	0	0

Final
**AF Piatykhatska Volodymyrivka**	**1**	**2**	**3**
SCC Demnya	0	1	1

== Competition schedule ==
=== First qualification round ===
Team 1	Agg.	Team 2	1st leg	2nd leg
FC Zarinok Tysovets	1 – 4	**FC Zbruch Volochysk**	0–3	1–1
FC Malynsk	2 – 3	**FC Avanhard Novohrad-Volynsky**	1–1	1–2
**FC AF Piatykhatska Volodymyrivka**	2 – 1	FC Arsenal-Kyiv	2–0	0–1
**FC VPK-Ahro Shevchenkivka**	3 – 3 (a)	FC Tavriya-Skif Rozdol	2–0	1–3
FC Kolos Zachepylivka	2 – 3	**FC Olimpik Petrykivka**	0–1	2–2
**FC Korosten**	3 – 2	FC Izotop-RAES Kuznetsovsk	2–1	1–1
FC Vinnytsia	w/o	**FC Yednist Plysky**	0–2	–/+

- Byes (9): Yevrobis-Ahrobiznes Kyiv, Kolos Kovalivka, ODEK Orzhiv, Zorya Biloziria, Myr Hornostayivka, MFC Pervomaisk, Balkany Zorya, Demnia, Torpedo Mykolaiv

=== Second qualification round ===
Team 1	Agg.	Team 2	1st leg	2nd leg
FC Yevrobis-Ahrobiznes Kyiv	w/o	**FC ODEK Orzhiv**	0–2	–/+
FC Korosten	2 – 4	**FC Kolos Kovalivka**	1–3	1–1
FC Olimpik Petrykivka	3 – 6	**FC Zorya Biloziria**	1–1	2–5
FC VPK-Ahro Shevchenkivka	1 – 2	**FC Myr Hornostayivka**	1–0	0–2
**FC Balkany Zorya**	7 – 1	MFC Pervomaisk	3–1	4–0
FC Zbruch Volochysk	1 – 2	**SCC Demnya**	0–2	1–0
**FC AF Piatykhatska Volodymyrivka**	13 – 3	FC Torpedo Mykolaiv	6–2	7–1
**FC Yednist Plysky**	3 – 0	FC Avanhard Novohrad-Volynsky	2–0	1–0

=== Quarterfinals (1/4) ===
Team 1	Agg.	Team 2	1st leg	2nd leg
FC ODEK Orzhiv	0 – 1	**SCC Demnya**	0–0	0–1
FC Yednist Plysky	1 – 5	**FC Kolos Kovalivka**	0–1	1–4
**FC AF Piatykhatska Volodymyrivka**	5 – 3	FC Zorya Biloziria	3–0	2–3
FC Balkany Zorya	1 – 2	**FC Myr Hornostayivka**	0–2	1–0

=== Semifinals (1/2) ===
Team 1	Agg.	Team 2	1st leg	2nd leg
**SCC Demnya**	1 – 0	FC Kolos Kovalivka	1–0	0–0
**FC AF Piatykhatska Volodymyrivka**	1–0	FC Myr Hornostayivka	0–0	1–0

=== Final ===
Team 1	Agg.	Team 2	1st leg	2nd leg
**FC AF Piatykhatska Volodymyrivka**	3 – 1	SCC Demnya	1–0	2–1

Winner of the 2014 Ukrainian Football Cup among amateur teams
**AF Piatykhatska Volodymyrivka (Kirovohrad Oblast)**; **1st time**

== See also ==
- 2014 Ukrainian Football Amateur League
- 2014–15 Ukrainian Cup
