= 2015–16 Ukrainian Premier League =

25th season of top-tier football league in Vyshcha Liha

Ukrainian Premier League
- Season: 2015–16
- Champions: Dynamo Kyiv; 15th title
- Champions League: Dynamo Kyiv; Shakhtar Donetsk
- Europa League: Zorya Luhansk; Vorskla Poltava; FC Oleksandriya
- Matches: 136
- Goals: 365 (2.68 per match)
- Top goalscorer: 22 – Alex Teixeira (Shakhtar)
- Biggest home win: 8 – Volyn 9–1 Metalurh (Round 15)
- Biggest away win: 6 – Metalurh 0–6 Zorya (Round 1), Stal 0–6 Dnipro (Round 11), Zorya 1–7 Shakhtar (Round 12), Metalurh 0–6 Dynamo (Round 16)
- Highest scoring: 10 – Volyn 9–1 Metalurh (Round 15)
- Longest winning run: 12 – Shakhtar (Round 6–17)
- Longest unbeaten run: 10 – Dynamo (Round 1–10)
- Longest winless run: 16 – Metalurh (Round 1–16)
- Longest losing run: 8 – Metalurh (Round 9–16)
- Highest attendance: 32,794 – Dynamo–Shakhtar (Round 11)
- Lowest attendance: 300 – Olimpik–Volyn (Round 19)
- All statistics correct as of 20 March 2016.

The 2015–16 Ukrainian Premier League season was the 25th top-level football competitions since the fall of the Soviet Union and the eighth since the establishment of the Ukrainian Premier League. Because of sponsorship the league changed its title for 2015–16 season to League Parimatch. The competition commenced on 17 July when Metalurh Zaporizhzhia hosted Zorya Luhansk in Zaporizhzhia. The first sixteen rounds were played before the winter break which began 6 December 2015; the competition resumed on 5 March 2016. The season concluded on 15 May 2016. Dynamo Kyiv were the defending champions. With the continuation of the war in Donbas, the league remained at 14 teams after being cut from 16 in the 2013–14 season.

== Format ==
It was confirmed that the championship would be played using a standard double round-robin tournament system. The last team would be relegated and would be replaced by the champion of the 2015–16 Ukrainian First League. In the event of a decision being made to expand the league to 16 teams next season, the last team will play a play-off game with a team that takes the third place of the 2015–16 Ukrainian First League, while the champion and runner-up would be promoted.

== Teams ==
=== Promotions ===
- FC Oleksandriya, the champion of the 2014–15 Ukrainian First League – (returning for the first time since 2011–12 season, four seasons absence).
- Stal Dniprodzerzhynsk, the runner-up of the 2014–15 Ukrainian First League – (debut). Note: the club replaced FC Metalurh Donetsk (see below).

=== Metalurh Donetsk / Stal Dniprodzerzhynsk case ===
After the previous season the president of FC Stal Dniprodzerzhynsk announced that the club will be merged with FC Metalurh Donetsk and replace them in the Premier League for the 2015–16 season because both clubs are owned by the Industrial Union of Donbas (ISD). On 11 July 2015, the owners of FC Metalurh Donetsk have sent a letter to the Football Federation of Ukraine announcing their withdrawal from the competitions. Right before the start of competitions it was uncertain which club will replace Metalurh either FC Stal Dniprodzerzhynsk or FC Illichivets Mariupol. On 14 July 2015, the administration of Illichivets released a letter explaining its reason why the club should remain in the league. Because the Premier League members did not manage to gather a quorum, on 16 July 2015, the Football Federation of Ukraine Executive Committee voted on to include Stal to the Premier League (29 for, 7 against and 1 abstain).

=== Metalurh Zaporizhzhia case ===
On 7 October 2015, FC Metalurh Zaporizhzhia petitioned to the Premier League to withdraw the club from the competition's participation due to the lack of financing. On 24 November 2015, Metalurh Zaporizhzhia informed the Premier League about decision of a deliberate assembly of the Metalurh Zaporizhzhia members in regards to liquidation of the club. On 2 March 2016, the Premier League cancelled the 17th-round game for Metalurh Zaporizhzhia because there are only four players were registered for the second half and only five more are allowed to be registered outside of a transfer window. Also the club failed to inform the league and the visiting team about place and time of the upcoming game.

On 13 March 2016, it was announced that the club's academy the Sports School Metalurh, was handed over to the city authorities after the liquidation of the club.

On 7 April 2016, another Zaporizhzhia city club "Rosso Nero" successfully changed its name to Metalurh Zaporizhzhia and will participate in the 2016 Ukrainian Football Amateur League.

=== Stal Dniprodzerzhynsk scandal ===
On 19 November 2015, there was appointed a new president of the club Vardan Israelian as the previous president Maksym Zavhorodniy changed his place of work. In a protest of appointing Vardan Israelian, the club's vice-president Mykola Kolyuchy resigned and replaced with Bohdan Napolov. On 24 December 2015, took place a meeting of members of FC Stal Dniprodzerzhynsk which decided discontinue contract with its U-19 team due to "a lack of patriotism" as well as liquidate contracts with number of players from the U-21 who were involved in corruption along with the team's head coach Serhiy Shyshchenko. Israelian informed that during his talk with Mazyar, the latter said that he will not work without Kolyuchy in the club.

=== Location map ===
Home venues of teams in the 2015–16 Ukrainian Premier League.
Teams in italics are from the conflict zone of the War in Donbas and are playing their home games in different cities.
Stal plays its games also in Dnipropetrovsk rather than at home.
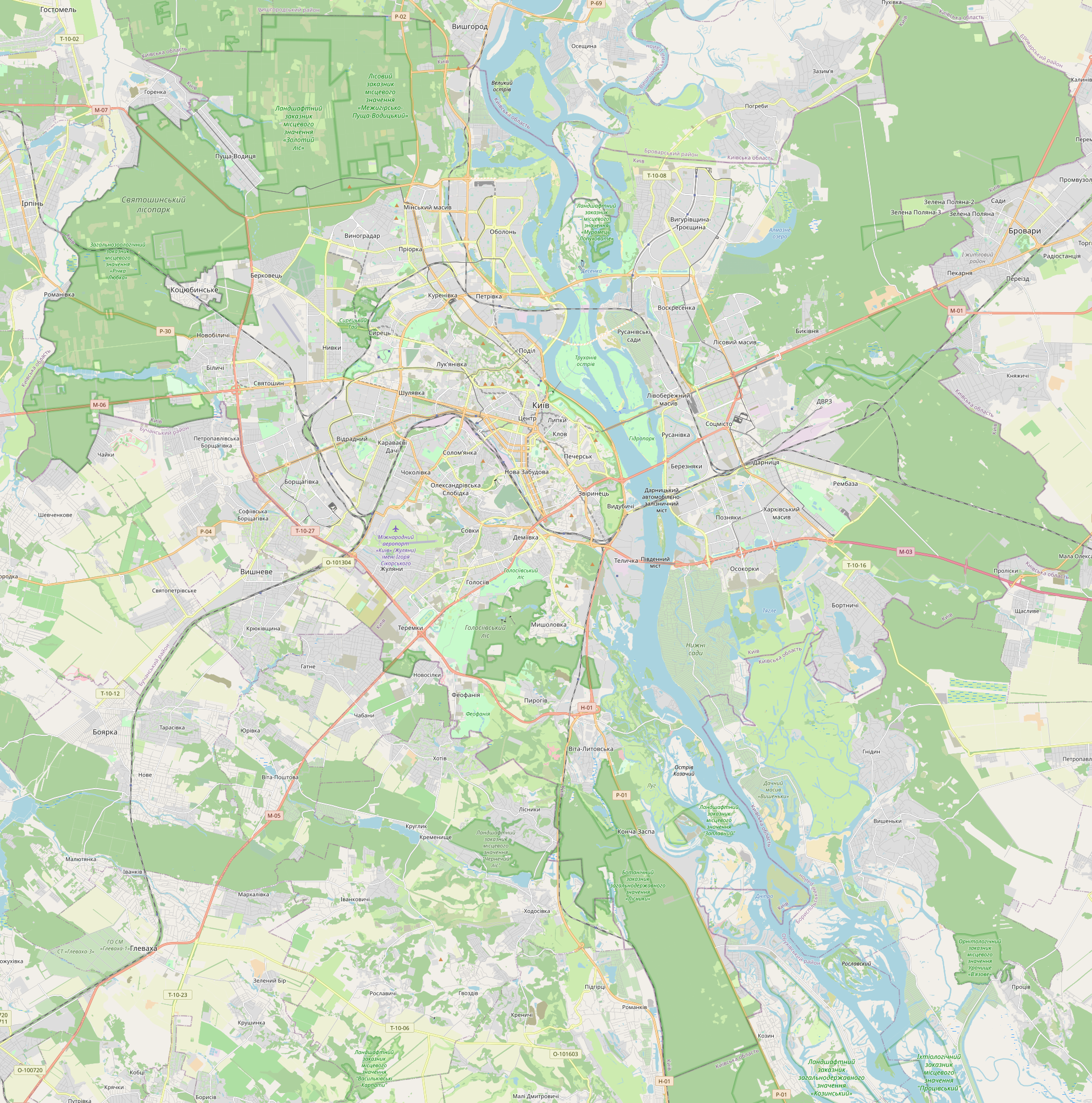
Kyiv city home venues of teams in the League
Lviv city home venues of teams in the League

=== Stadiums ===
The following stadiums are regarded as home grounds:

Rank	Stadium	Club	Capacity	Highest Attendance		Notes
1	NSC Olimpiyskiy	Dynamo Kyiv	70,050	32,794	Round 11 (Shakhtar)	
2	OSC Metalist	Metalist Kharkiv	40,003	16,855	Round 7 (Shakhtar)	
3	Arena Lviv	Shakhtar Donetsk	34,915	6,497	Round 24 (Dynamo)	Used as home ground during season
3	Arena Lviv	Karpaty Lviv	34,915	14,656	Round 18 (Dynamo)	Used as home ground in round 18
4	Chornomorets Stadium	Chornomorets Odesa	34,164	22,222	Round 3 (Dynamo)	
4	Chornomorets Stadium	Shakhtar Donetsk	34,164	13,213	Round 5 (Dnipro)	Used as home ground in rounds 5 and 16
5	Dnipro-Arena	Dnipro Dnipropetrovsk	31,003	22,060	Round 4 (Dynamo)	
6	Ukraina Stadium	Karpaty Lviv	28,051	7,328	Round 7 (Zorya)	
7	Vorskla Stadium	Vorskla Poltava	24,795	16,000	Round 10 (Dynamo)	
8	Meteor Stadium	Stal Dniprodzerzhynsk	24,381	5,500	Round 11 (Dnipro)	Used as home ground during season
9	Dynamo Stadium	Olimpik Donetsk	16,873	2,500	Round 14 (Dynamo)	Used as home ground in Round 14
9	Dynamo Stadium	Metalurh Zaporizhzhia	16,873	4,800	Round 16 (Dynamo)	Used as home ground in Round 16
10	Avanhard Stadium	Volyn Lutsk	12,080	10,280	Round 8 (Dynamo)	
11	Slavutych-Arena	Metalurh Zaporizhzhia	12,000	6,960	Round 10 (Olimpik)	
11	Slavutych-Arena	Zorya Luhansk	12,000	6,800	Round 6 (Dynamo)	Used as home ground during season
11	Slavutych-Arena	Shakhtar Donetsk	12,000	6,751	Round 14 (Zorya)	Used as home ground in Round 14 & 26
12	Avanhard Stadium	Hoverla Uzhhorod	12,000	3,600	Round 15 (Shakhtar)	
13	CSC Nika Stadium	Oleksandriya	7,000	6,500	Round 13 (Shakhtar)	
14	Bannikov Stadium	Olimpik Donetsk	1,678	1,050	Round 9 (Shakhtar)	Used as home ground during season
14	Bannikov Stadium	Shakhtar Donetsk	1,678	1,354	Round 8 (Stal)	Used as home ground in Round 8

Note:

Round when attendance is noted as highest is the chronological number of the round, not the published round by the Ukrainian Premier League since some rounds were rescheduled for a later date.

=== Personnel and sponsorship ===
Team	Home city	Head coach	Captain	Kit manufacturer	Shirt sponsor
Chornomorets Odesa	Odesa	(Ukraine) Oleksandr Babych (interim)	(Ukraine) Artem Filimonov	Nike	2+2
Dnipro Dnipropetrovsk	Dnipropetrovsk	(Ukraine) Myron Markevych	(Ukraine) Ruslan Rotan	Nike	Біола
Dynamo Kyiv	Kyiv	(Ukraine) Serhii Rebrov	(Ukraine) Oleksandr Shovkovskyi	adidas	—
Hoverla Uzhhorod	Uzhhorod	(Ukraine) Vyacheslav Hroznyi	(Ukraine) Dmytro Babenko	adidas	—
Karpaty Lviv	Lviv	(Ukraine) Oleh Luzhnyi	(Ukraine) Ihor Plastun	Joma	Pari-Match
Metalist Kharkiv	Kharkiv	(Ukraine) Oleksandr Pryzetko (interim)	(Ukraine) Volodymyr Pryyomov	adidas	VETEK
Metalurh Zaporizhzhia	Zaporizhzhia	(Ukraine) Anatoliy Chantsev	(Ukraine) Vitaliy Lysytskyi	Nike	—
FC Oleksandriya	Oleksandriya	(Ukraine) Volodymyr Sharan	(Ukraine) Andriy Zaporozhan	Nike	УкрАгроКом
Olimpik Donetsk	Donetsk	(Ukraine) Roman Sanzhar	(Ukraine) Dmytro Hryshko	Puma	Altkom
Shakhtar Donetsk	Donetsk	(Romania) Mircea Lucescu	(Croatia) Darijo Srna	Nike	SCM
Stal Dniprodzerzhynsk	Dniprodzerzhynsk	(Netherlands) Erik van der Meer	(Ukraine) Maksym Kalenchuk	Nike	ISD
Volyn Lutsk	Lutsk	(Ukraine) Vitaliy Kvartsyanyi	(Ukraine) Serhiy Kravchenko	adidas	—
Vorskla Poltava	Poltava	(Ukraine) Vasyl Sachko	(Albania) Armend Dallku	adidas	Ferrexpo
Zorya Luhansk	Luhansk	(Ukraine) Yuriy Vernydub	(Ukraine) Mykyta Kamenyuka	Nike	—

=== Managerial changes ===
Team	Outgoing manager	Manner of departure	Date of vacancy	Table	Incoming manager	Date of appointment
Metalist Kharkiv	(Ukraine) Ihor Rakhayev	Mutual consent	4 June	Pre-season	(Ukraine) Oleksandr Sevidov	4 June
Karpaty Lviv	(Croatia) Igor Jovićević (interim)	Change of contract	1 September	6th	(Croatia) Igor Jovićević	1 September
Stal Dniprodzerzhynsk	(Ukraine) Volodymyr Mazyar	existing contract until 2017	undefined	9th	(Netherlands) Erik van der Meer	16 January
Karpaty Lviv	(Croatia) Igor Jovićević	End of contract	12 January	8th	(Ukraine) Oleh Luzhnyi & (Ukraine) Volodymyr Bezubyak	22 January
Metalist Kharkiv	(Ukraine) Oleksandr Sevidov	Resigned	18 April	10th	(Ukraine) Oleksandr Pryzetko (interim)	18 April

== Qualification for 2016–17 European competitions ==
- Since Ukraine finished in eighth place of the UEFA country ranking after the 2014–15 season, the league will have the same number of qualifiers for 2016–17 UEFA Europa League — 3. The Ukrainian Cup winner qualifies for the Group stage.

=== Qualified teams ===
- After the 19th round and announcement made by the Adjudicatory Chamber of the UEFA Club Financial Control Body (CFCB) in regards to Dnipro Dnipropetrovsk (see the standings table), both Dynamo Kyiv and Shakhtar Donetsk qualified for European football for the 2016–17 season.
- After the quarter-finals second leg of the Ukrainian Cup, Zorya Luhansk qualified for European football for the 2016–17 season.
- After the 21st round, Dynamo Kyiv qualified for the 2016–17 UEFA Champions League as they secured a top 2 finish in the league.
- After the 22nd round, Shakhtar Donetsk qualified for the 2016–17 UEFA Champions League as they secured a top 2 finish in the league. At the same time, Zorya Luhansk qualified for the 2016-17 UEFA Europa League (third qualifying round) as they secured a top six finish in the league (see below for further information). Zorya Luhansk could still qualify for group stage instead, depending on cup winners.
- After the 23rd round, Dynamo Kyiv qualified for the 2016–17 UEFA Champions League (group stage) by winning the league three rounds ahead of finish. One of the last three games is against the expelled Metalurh Zaporizhzhia for which they guaranteed another three point. At the same time, Shakhtar Donetsk qualified for the 2016-17 UEFA Champions League (third qualifying round) as they secured the second place.
- After the 24th round, Vorskla Poltava qualified for the 2016–17 UEFA Europa League yet it still could qualify for group stage.
- After the 25th round, FC Oleksandriya qualified for the 2016–17 UEFA Europa League yet it still could qualify for group stage.
- After the 26th round, Zorya Luhansk qualified for the 2016–17 UEFA Europa League Group Stage by securing the third best league position eligible for the European competition and making the outcome of the 2016 Ukrainian Cup Final irrelevant for the European qualification. At the same time, Vorskla Poltava and FC Oleksandriya will start at the 2016-17 UEFA Europe League third qualification round.

== League table ==
Pos	Team	Pld	W	D	L	GF	GA	GD	Pts	Qualification or relegation
1	Dynamo Kyiv (C)	26	23	1	2	54	11	+43	70	Qualification to Champions League group stage
2	Shakhtar Donetsk	26	20	3	3	76	25	+51	63	Qualification to Champions League third qualifying round (Note: Shakhtar Donetsk qualified for the Europa League group stage by winning the 2015–16 Ukrainian Cup. However, since they already qualified for European competition based on their league position, the spot awarded to the cup winners was passed down the league.)
3	Dnipro Dnipropetrovsk (Note: On 31 March 2016, the Adjudicatory Chamber of the UEFA Club Financial Control Body (CFCB) announced that Dnipro Dnipropetrovsk will be excluded from participating in the next UEFA club competition for which they would otherwise qualify in the next three (3) seasons (i.e. the 2016–17, 2017–18 and 2018–19 seasons).)	26	16	5	5	50	22	+28	53	
4	Zorya Luhansk	26	14	6	6	51	26	+25	48	Qualification to Europa League group stage
5	Vorskla Poltava	26	11	9	6	32	26	+6	42	Qualification to Europa League third qualifying round
6	FC Oleksandriya	26	10	8	8	30	29	+1	38	Qualification to Europa League third qualifying round
7	Karpaty Lviv	26	8	6	12	26	37	−11	30	
8	Stal Dniprodzerzhynsk	26	7	8	11	22	31	−9	29	
9	Olimpik Donetsk	26	6	7	13	22	35	−13	25	
10	Metalist Kharkiv	26	5	9	12	19	46	−27	24	Failed to receive attestation for the next season (Note: On 22 April 2016, the FFU Committee announced that Metalist Kharkiv and Hoverla Uzhhorod would not be allowed to participate in the professional competitions because of their debts to their players as well as Volyn Lutsk due to the fact that they had not even applied for a license for the following season. On 16 May 2016 the FFU Appeal Committee adopted decision to leave in force the decision of the FFU Football Clubs Attestation Committee of 22 April 2016 and refuse in issuing attestation for the next season for Hoverla Uzhhorod and Metalist Kharkiv by declining their appeals.)
11	Chornomorets Odesa	26	4	10	12	20	39	−19	22	
12	Volyn Lutsk (Note: Volyn Lutsk were deducted a total of eighteen points. Twelve points were deducted initially by FIFA for non-payment of wages owed to former players (Issa Ndoye and Dušan Savić). An additional six points were deducted by the Football Federation of Ukraine due to the club not complying with FIFA directives. On 30 May 2016 some Ukrainian media announced that Volyn was issued the attestation for the next season without financial guarantees. Later same day a FFU representative confirmed that Volyn managed to provide financial guarantees and made all required pre pays on time.)	26	10	8	8	36	36	0	20	
13	Hoverla Uzhhorod (Note: Hoverla Uzhhorod had nine points deducted due to not complying with decisions of the FFU Control and Disciplinary Committee (CDC).)	26	3	7	16	13	45	−32	7	Failed to receive attestation for the next season
14	Metalurh Zaporizhya (D)	26	0	3	23	7	50	−43	3	Expelled from competition during the season (Note: On 7 October 2015 FC Metalurh Zaporizhia petitioned to the Premier Liha to withdraw the club from the competition's participation due to the lack of financing. On 24 November 2015 Metalurh Zaporizhia informed the Premier Liha about decision of a deliberate assembly of the Metalurh Zaporizhia members in regards to liquidation of the club. Metalurh Zaporizhia were expelled from the competition after the winter break. Technical victories will be awarded to their opponents for the rest of season. In late April, it was announced that the team had not received a license for next season. On 2 March 2016 the Premier Liha cancelled the 17th round game for Metalurh Zaporizhia due to the fact that there are only four players were registered for the second half and only five more are allowed to be registered outside of a transfer window. Also the club failed to inform the league and the visiting team about place and time of the upcoming game.)

Source: uafootball.net.ua
Rules for classification: 1) Points; 2) Goal difference; 3) Goals scored; 4) Head-to-head points; 5) Head-to-head goal difference; 6) Head-to-head goals scored; 7) Fairplay ranking; 8) Draw.
(C) Champions; (D) Disqualified

=== Results ===
Home \ Away	CHO	DNI	DYK	HOV (Note: On 15 April 2016 the FFU Control and Disciplinary Committee (KDK) adopted decision to award FC Hoverla Uzhhorod technical losses in last two games (at home against Olimpik and away against Chornomorets) where the club fielded a player (Vitālijs Jagodinskis) and allowed a banned coach (Oleksiy Velychko) who were supposed to serve their suspension. The club was also fined a total of ₴60,000 (~$2,000).)	KAR	MET	MZA (Note: Premier League administration cancelled Round 17 and 18 matches due to Metalurh Zaporizhzhia not having enough players registered to compete. Metalurh Zaporizhzhia was expelled from the competition and all their remaining games are technical losses (-:+), while their opponents receive a technical victory (+:-).)	OLK	OLD	STD	SHA	VOL	VOR	ZOR
Chornomorets Odesa	—	0–0	0–2	1–0	0–0	0–1	5–2	1–2	0–2	1–1	1–1	1–2	0–0	0–2
Dnipro	4–2	—	1–2	2–0	2–0	5–0	+:-	2–0	1–1	2–0	4–1	0–1	0–2	0–3
Dynamo Kyiv	2–1	2–0	—	2–0	3–0	2–0	+:-	3–0	2–0	2–0	0–3	3–0	1–0	1–0
Hoverla Uzhhorod (Note: On 15 April 2016 the FFU Control and Disciplinary Committee (KDK) adopted decision to award FC Hoverla Uzhhorod technical losses in last two games (at home against Olimpik and away against Chornomorets) where the club fielded a player (Vitālijs Jagodinskis) and allowed a banned coach (Oleksiy Velychko) who were supposed to serve their suspension. The club was also fined a total of ₴60,000 (~$2,000).)	1–1	1–1	0–2	—	0–2	1–0	1–1	1–2	0–2	0–0	1–6	1–4	1–1	0–4
Karpaty Lviv	4–0	0–1	1–2	3–0	—	1–1	1–0	2–2	4–1	1–0	1–2	0–2	1–3	1–1
Metalist Kharkiv	2–2	1–2	1–4	2–2	2–0	—	+:-	1–1	1–0	1–1	0–5	3–0	0–3	0–1
Metalurh Zaporizhzhia (Note: Premier League administration cancelled Round 17 and 18 matches due to Metalurh Zaporizhzhia not having enough players registered to compete. Metalurh Zaporizhzhia was expelled from the competition and all their remaining games are technical losses (-:+), while their opponents receive a technical victory (+:-).)	-:+	1–4	0–6	-:+	-:+	0–0	—	0–2	0–3	-:+	-:+	0–2	1–1	0–6
FC Oleksandriya	0–0	0–4	0–2	2–0	4–1	2–0	1–0	—	0–0	0–1	2–3	3–1	1–1	2–0
Olimpik Donetsk	2–2	1–1	0–3	0–1	0–1	3–0	+:-	1–0	—	0–2	2–3	1–1	1–1	1–1
Stal Dniprodzerzhynsk	0–1	0–6	1–2	1–0	1–1	0–0	3–0	2–2	1–0	—	3–3	1–2	1–2	2–0
Shakhtar Donetsk	2–0	0–2	3–0	2–0	3–0	8–1	2–0	2–0	3–0	2–0	—	4–0	3–1	2–3
Volyn Lutsk	1–1	2–3	0–2	0–0	0–0	2–2	9–1	0–0	1–0	1–0	1–4	—	2–1	0–3
Vorskla Poltava	2–0	1–1	0–4	2–1	3–0	1–0	+:-	0–1	2–1	0–0	2–2	1–1	—	0–2
Zorya Luhansk	4–0	1–2	0–0	2–1	4–1	0–0	4–1	1–1	4–0	2–1	1–7	1–1	1–2	—

Source: uafootball.net.ua
Legend: Blue = home team win; Yellow = draw; Red = away team win.

=== Positions by round ===
The following table represents the teams position after each round in the competition played chronologically. Originally scheduled Round 12 has been scheduled to be played after Round 16.

Team ╲ Round	1	2	3	4	5	6	7	8	9	10	11	12	13	14	15	16	17	18	19	20	21	22	23	24	25	26
Dynamo Kyiv	4	2	2	1	1	1	1	1	1	1	2	2	2	2	2	2	2	1	1	1	1	1	1	1	1	1
Shakhtar Donetsk	3	1	1	2	3	2	2	2	2	2	1	1	1	1	1	1	1	2	2	2	2	2	2	2	2	2
Dnipro	7	4	4	7	5	4	3	4	3	3	3	3	3	3	4	4	4	4	4	4	4	3	3	3	3	3
Zorya Luhansk	1	3	6	4	2	3	5	3	5	4	4	4	4	4	3	3	3	3	3	3	3	4	4	4	4	4
Vorskla Poltava	10	8	10	9	9	7	6	5	6	6	5	5	6	5	5	6	5	5	5	5	5	5	5	5	5	5
FC Oleksandriya	13	7	8	10	11	11	11	9	10	11	8	8	9	8	8	7	6	6	6	6	6	6	6	6	6	6
Karpaty Lviv	12	6	3	3	4	6	7	7	8	7	7	7	7	7	7	8	7	7	7	7	7	8	7	7	8	7
Stal Dniprodzerzhynsk	11	13	9	6	8	9	9	11	7	8	9	9	10	10	10	9	8	8	8	8	8	7	8	8	7	8
Olimpik Donetsk	6	11	12	12	12	12	12	12	12	12	10	10	8	9	9	10	10	9	9	9	9	9	9	9	9	9
Metalist Kharkiv	2	5	5	5	7	8	10	10	11	9	12	12	12	12	11	11	11	10	11	12	10	10	10	10	10	10
Chornomorets Odesa	5	10	13	13	14	13	13	13	13	13	13	13	13	13	13	12	12	13	13	13	12	13	12	11	11	11
Volyn Lutsk	9	12	7	8	6	5	4	6	4	5	6	6	5	6	6	5	9	12	12	11	13	12	11	12	12	12
Hoverla Uzhhorod	8	9	11	11	10	10	8	8	9	10	11	11	11	11	12	13	13	11	10	10	11	11	13	13	13	13
Metalurh Zaporizhzhia	14	14	14	14	13	14	14	14	14	14	14	14	14	14	14	14	14	14	14	14	14	14	14	14	14	14

== Season statistics ==
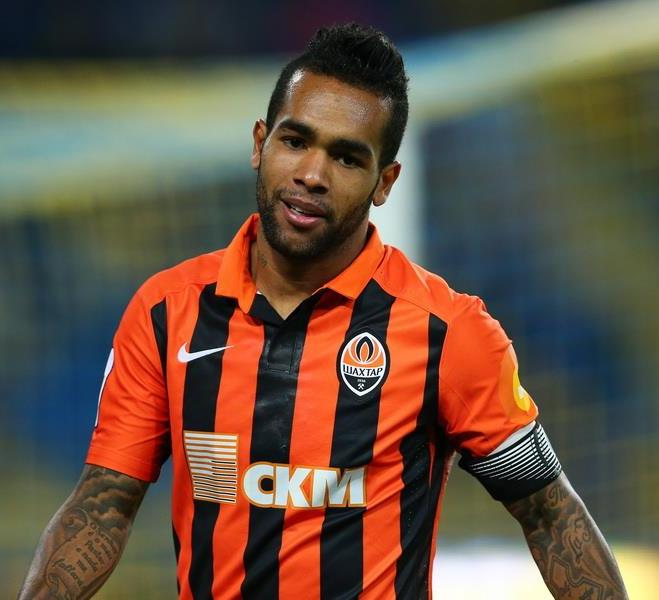
Teixeira in 2015

=== Top goalscorers ===
As of 21 May 2016

Rank	Player	Club	Goals (Pen.)
1	(Brazil) Alex Teixeira^{(6)}	Shakhtar Donetsk	22 (5)
2	(Ukraine) Pylyp Budkivskyi	Zorya Luhansk	14
3	(Ukraine) Andriy Yarmolenko	Dynamo Kyiv	13 (1)
4	(Croatia) Eduardo da Silva	Shakhtar Donetsk	12
5	(Ukraine) Yevhen Seleznyov^{(7)}	Dnipro Dnipropetrovsk	10 (2)
5	(Ukraine) Oleh Husyev	Dynamo Kyiv	10 (4)
7	(Ukraine) Oleksandr Karavayev	Zorya Luhansk	8
7	(Brazil) Marlos^{(8)}	Shakhtar Donetsk	8 (2)
7	(Ukraine) Anton Shynder	Vorskla Poltava	8 (2)
10	(Brazil) Júnior Moraes	Dynamo Kyiv	7
10	(Ukraine) Dmytro Khlyobas	Vorskla Poltava	7
10	(Ukraine) Vitaliy Ponomar	FC Oleksandriya	7
10	(Brazil) Matheus	Dnipro Dnipropetrovsk	7 (1)
10	(Ukraine) Volodymyr Pryyomov	Metalist Kharkiv	7 (1)

Notes:

- ^(6) On 4 February 2016 it was announced that Alex Teixeira was sold to a Chinese club Jiangsu Suning F.C. for €50 million.
- ^(7) On 25 February 2016 Yevhen Seleznyov was sold to FC Kuban Krasnodar. On 14 May 2016 Seleznyov signed with FC Shakhtar Donetsk.
- ^(8) On 29 September 2017 it was announced that Marlos officially received Ukrainian citizenship. Until his time he was a Brazilian nationality.

=== Hat-tricks ===
Player	For	Against	Result	Date
(Ukraine) Yevhen Seleznyov^{4}	Dnipro Dnipropetrovsk	Stal Dniprodzerzhynsk	6–0	17 October 2015
(Ukraine) Vyacheslav Sharpar	Volyn Lutsk	Metalurh Zaporizhzhia	9–1	29 November 2015
(Brazil) Taison	Shakhtar Donetsk	Metalist Kharkiv	8–1	1 April 2016
(Ukraine) Andriy Totovytskyi	Zorya Luhansk	Shakhtar Donetsk	3–2	15 May 2016

^{4} Player scored four goals

away win
home win
tie

=== Awards ===
The laureates of the 2015–16 UPL season were:

- Best player: (Ukraine) Andriy Yarmolenko (Dynamo Kyiv)
- Best coach: (Ukraine) Serhii Rebrov (Dynamo Kyiv)
- Best goalkeeper: (Ukraine) Andriy Pyatov (Shakhtar Donetsk)
- Best arbiter: (Ukraine) Anatoliy Abdula (Kharkiv)
- Best young player: (Ukraine) Viktor Kovalenko (Shakhtar Donetsk)
- Best goalscorer: (Brazil) Alex Teixeira (Shakhtar Donetsk)
- Best discipline: (Ukraine) Vitaliy Ponomar (Oleksandriya)

== See also ==
- 2015–16 Ukrainian First League
- 2015–16 Ukrainian Premier League Reserves and Under 19
- 2015–16 Ukrainian Second League
- 2015–16 Ukrainian Cup
- 2015–16 UEFA Europa League
- 2015–16 UEFA Champions League
