= 2015–16 Ukrainian Second League =

Ukrainian Second League
- Season: 2015–16
- Country: Ukraine
- Teams: 14
- Champions: FC Kolos Kovalivka
- Promoted: Kolos Kovalivka; Veres Rivne; Inhulets Petrove; Bukovyna Chernivtsi; Skala Stryi; Arsenal-Kyiv Kyiv
- Relegated: ~~Barsa~~ (withdrew)
- Matches: 182
- Goals: 487 (2.68 per match)
- Top goalscorer: 20 – Oleksandr Bondarenko (Kolos)
- Biggest home win: Kremin 8–0 Arsenal-Kyivshchyna (Round 26)
- Biggest away win: Nikopol-NPHU 0–6 Bukovyna (Round 5)
- Highest scoring: 8 – Kremin 8–0 Arsenal-Kyivshchyna (Round 26)
- Longest winning run: 5 – Skala (Round 4–8); Veres (Round 5–9); Kremin (Round 13–17); Kolos (Round 21–25)
- Longest unbeaten run: 9 – Inhulets (Round 1–9) and (Round 16–24); Kolos (Round 1–9)
- Longest winless run: 16 – Barsa (Round 7–22)
- Longest losing run: 7 – Barsa (Round 16–22)
- Highest attendance: 5,400 – Bukovyna–Barsa (Round 11)
- Lowest attendance: 50 – Nikopol-NPHU–Real Pharma (Round 14)

The 2015–16 Ukrainian Second League was the 25th season of 3rd level professional football in Ukraine. The competition commenced on 26 July 2015 with a full round of matches. From 1 November 2015 to 26 March 2016 the competition was on winter break. The competition resumed with Round 16 and completed on 1 June 2016.

== Team changes ==
=== Admitted teams ===
The following teams were admitted by the PFL after playing in the 2015 Ukrainian Football Amateur League and passing attestation.

- FC Myr Hornostayivka – initial group stage (returning after an absence of one season)
- FC Kolos Kovalivka – intermediate group stage (debut)
- FC Barsa Sumy – initial group stage (two seasons before) (debut)
- FC Inhulets Petrove – intermediate group stage (debut)
- FC Arsenal-Kyiv – (debut)
  - FC Arsenal-Kyiv is regarded as a successor of FC Arsenal Kyiv which 22 years ago as FC Borysfen Boryspil participated in the Second League.
- NK Veres Rivne – (returning after an absence of four seasons)
  - NK Veres Rivne is regarded as a successor of FC Veres Rivne.

=== Relegated teams ===
- FSC Bukovyna Chernivtsi – (returning after an absence of five seasons)

=== Withdrawn teams ===
- Shakhtar-3 Donetsk withdrew from the PFL before the start of the 2015–16 season.

=== Relocated teams ===
- Real Pharma moved their operations from Ovidiopol to Odesa prior to the start of the season.

=== Renamed teams ===
- FC Nikopol-NPHU – Prior to the start of the season FC NPHU-Makiyivvuhillya Nikopol formally withdrew from the PFL and then reentered under their new name.

=== Location map ===
The following displays the location of teams.

Home venues of teams in the 2015–16 Ukrainian Second League.

== League table ==
Pos	Team	Pld	W	D	L	GF	GA	GD	Pts	Promotion or relegation
1	Kolos Kovalivka (C, P)	26	19	3	4	62	22	+40	60	Promoted to Ukrainian First League (Note: On 19 June 2015 the Professional Football League of Ukraine confirmed the number of clubs and criteria for relegation for the next season. It was decided that top two clubs would be promoted for the next season with the third playing play-off against the 14th placed team in the First League. However, two days before the end of the season, on 30 May 2016 the PFL ruled that due to sporting principles to keep 16 teams in the First League the promotion-relegation playoff match between the third placed team against the 14th placed team in the First League is cancelled and that the third placed team will be automatically promoted to the first League.)
2	Veres Rivne (P)	26	16	4	6	41	24	+17	52	Promoted to Ukrainian First League
3	Inhulets Petrove (P)	26	14	8	4	37	16	+21	50	Promoted to Ukrainian First League
4	Bukovyna Chernivtsi (P)	26	13	8	5	39	22	+17	47	Promoted to Ukrainian First League
5	Skala Stryi (P)	26	13	7	6	41	23	+18	46	Promoted to Ukrainian First League
6	Arsenal Kyiv (P)	26	13	4	9	37	30	+7	43	Promoted to Ukrainian First League
7	Real Pharma Odesa	26	12	5	9	31	29	+2	41	
8	Kremin Kremenchuk	26	11	7	8	43	31	+12	40	
9	Enerhiya Nova Kakhovka	26	10	3	13	31	38	−7	33	
10	Krystal Kherson	26	9	1	16	31	47	−16	28	
11	Myr Hornostayivka	26	8	3	15	38	47	−9	27	
12	Barsa Sumy	26	5	3	18	14	51	−37	18	Withdrew after the season (Note: After the season the Administration of Barsa Sumy informed the PFL that they would withdraw from the professional league. (7 July 2016))
13	Arsenal-Kyivshchyna Bila Tserkva	26	5	2	19	24	56	−32	17	
14	FC Nikopol-NPHU	26	2	6	18	18	51	−33	12	

Source: Scoresway
Rules for classification: 1) points 2) goal difference 3) goals scored 4) head-to-head points 5) head-to-head goal difference 6) head-to-head goals scored 7) head-to-head fair play (all games) 8) draw or playoff
(C) Champions; (P) Promoted

=== Results ===
As of 1 June 2016

Home \ Away	ARK	AKB	BAS	BUC	ENK	IHP	KOK	KRE	KRK	NIK	MYH	RPO	SKS	VER
Arsenal Kyiv (Note: Arsenal Kyiv played their home games at Kniazha Arena from Round 8 onwards instead of Kolos Stadium)		2–1	3–0	1–0	0–3	3–1	3–1	1–1	2–1	2–0	3–2	4–0	0–3	1–2
Arsenal-Kyivschyna Bila Tserkva	0–2		5–1	0–2	2–0	0–0	0–4	1–2	1–2	2–4	0–3	0–1	0–2	2–1
Barsa Sumy	1–0	0–1		0–1	0–3	0–1	0–2	1–0	2–0	0–0	1–1	0–1	1–3	1–4
Bukovyna Chernivtsi	0–0	2–1	1–1		2–1	2–2	2–0	0–0	2–0	0–0	2–0	2–0	0–0	2–1
Enerhiya Nova Kakhovka	1–2	4–3	1–0	1–2		0–1	1–1	0–4	3–0	4–2	2–0	0–2	0–1	1–3
Inhulets Petrove	4–0	4–1	2–0 (Note: Inhulets Petrove played their Round 16 and Round 18 matches at O.H. Povoroznyuka Stadium in Volodymyrivka, Kirovohrad Oblast.)	2–0	0–1		1–0	2–1	3–0	2–0	0–0	0–0	2–0	3–1
Kolos Kovalivka	1–0	2–0	7–0	2–2	6–1	1–1		3–1	2–0	2–0	4–2	2–0	0–3	3–2
Kremin Kremenchuk	1–0	8–0	3–1	1–3	0–0	0–0	1–3		2–1	1–1	2–1	1–0	3–1	1–1
Krystal Kherson	2–0	2–0	2–0	3–1	2–0	0–2	0–4	3–2		3–2	3–4	1–2	2–2	0–2
Nikopol	0–0	1–0	0–1	0–6	1–2	1–1	1–5	0–3	0–1		1–4	1–2	2–2	0–1
Myr Hornostayivka	2–3	3–0	0–1	3–2	1–1	1–3	0–1	3–4	1–0	1–0		2–1	0–3	0–1
Real Pharma Odesa	0–3	0–0	4–0	3–2	0–1	0–0	1–2	3–0	3–2	3–0	3–1		1–0	1–1
Skala Stryi	0–0	2–3	3–1	0–0	1–0	2–0	0–1	1–1	2–1	2–1	3–2	4–0		0–1
Veres Rivne	3–2	2–1	3–0	0–1	2–0	2–0	0–3	1–0	2–0	1–0	3–1	0–0	1–1	

Updated to match(es) played on 1 June 2016. Source: (in Ukrainian)
Legend: Blue = home team win; Yellow = draw; Red = away team win.

=== Round by round ===
The following table represents the teams position after each round in the competition.

Team ╲ Round	1	2	3	4	5	6	7	8	9	10	11	12	13	14	15	16	17	18	19	20	21	22	23	24	25	26
Kolos Kovalivka	4	4	3	2	1	1	1	1	1	1	1	1	1	1	1	1	1	1	1	1	1	1	1	1	1	1
Veres Rivne	6	7	5	7	5	3	3	3	3	2	4	3	3	4	3	2	2	4	3	3	3	2	2	2	2	2
Inhulets Petrove	2	1	1	1	2	2	2	2	2	4	3	2	4	5	5	4	5	3	4	4	4	3	3	3	3	3
Bukovyna Chernivtsi	12	6	8	6	3	6	5	5	5	5	5	5	5	3	4	5	4	5	5	5	5	5	4	4	5	4
Skala Stryi	10	10	9	8	7	5	4	4	4	3	2	4	2	2	2	3	3	2	2	2	2	4	5	5	4	5
Arsenal Kyiv	9	11	11	10	8	8	9	9	8	6	6	7	6	6	8	8	8	7	6	8	8	8	7	7	6	6
Real Pharma Odesa	1	5	7	5	9	9	8	8	9	7	8	6	7	7	6	6	7	8	7	6	6	6	6	6	7	7
Kremin Kremenchuk	7	8	6	9	10	10	10	10	10	11	9	9	8	8	7	7	6	6	8	7	7	7	8	8	8	8
Enerhiya Nova Kakhovka	8	9	10	11	12	13	12	12	13	12	12	12	12	12	12	11	11	11	11	11	11	11	11	10	9	9
Krystal Kherson	3	2	2	3	4	7	6	6	6	10	11	11	10	10	10	10	9	10	9	9	9	10	10	11	11	10
Myr Hornostayivka	11	13	14	14	11	11	11	11	11	9	7	8	9	9	9	9	10	9	10	10	10	9	9	9	10	11
Barsa Sumy	5	3	4	4	6	4	7	7	7	8	10	10	11	11	11	12	12	12	12	12	12	12	12	12	12	12
Arsenal-Kyivschyna Bila Tserkva	13	14	12	12	13	14	14	14	12	13	13	13	13	13	13	13	13	13	13	13	13	13	13	13	13	13
Nikopol	14	12	13	13	14	12	13	13	14	14	14	14	14	14	14	14	14	14	14	14	14	14	14	14	14	14

Updated to match(es) played on 1 June 2016. Source: pfl.ua

== Top goalscorers ==
As of 1 June 2016

Rank	Scorer	Goals (Pen.)	Team
1	(Ukraine) Oleksandr Bondarenko	20 (1)	Kolos Kovalivka
2	(Ukraine) Ihor Tymchenko	17 (3)	Kremin Kremenchuk
3	(Ukraine) Yuriy Komyahin	13 (4)	Myr Hornostayivka
4	(Ukraine) Vitaliy Ryabushko	10	Skala Stryi
5	(Ukraine) Anton Yaremenko	8	Veres Rivne
5	(Ukraine) Kostyantyn Cherniy	8 (3)	Kremin Kremenchuk

== See also ==
- 2015–16 Ukrainian Premier League
- 2015–16 Ukrainian First League
- 2015–16 Ukrainian Cup
