= Vitaliy Pavlov (footballer, born 1988) =

Ukrainian footballer

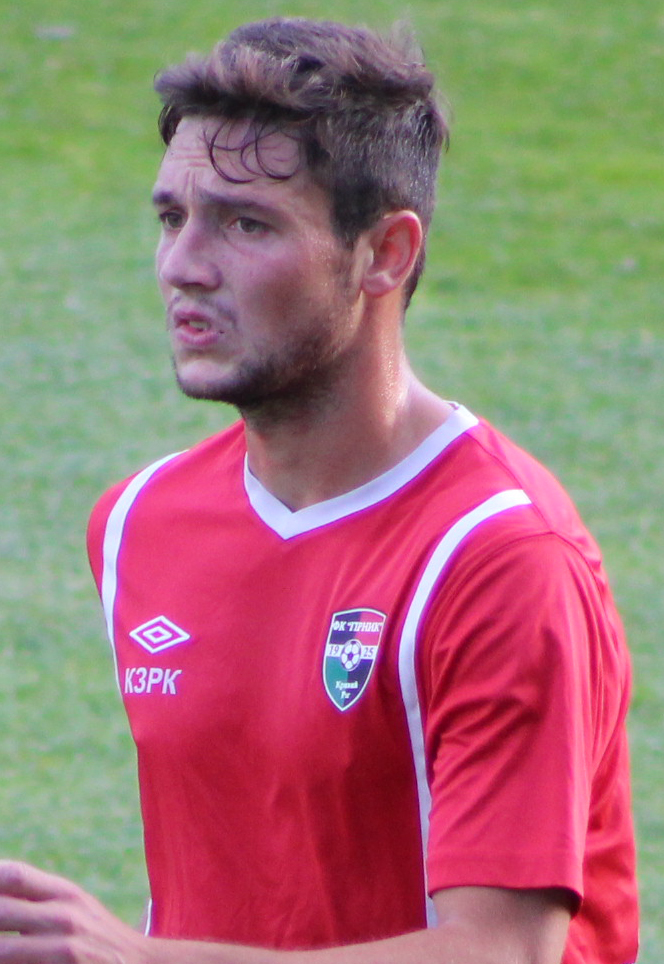

Personal information
- Full name: Vitaliy Serhiyovych Pavlov
- Date of birth: 25 June 1988 (age 38)
- Place of birth: Kryvyi Rih, Ukrainian SSR
- Height: 1.85 m (6 ft 1 in)
- Position: Midfielder

Youth career
- 2001–2006: Kryvbas Kryvyi Rih Youth

Senior career*
Years	Team	Apps	(Gls)
2007–2009	Kryvbas Kryvyi Rih	3	(0)
2009	Prykarpattya Ivano-Frankivsk	3	(0)
2009	Myr Hornostayivka		
2010–2016	Hirnyk Kryvyi Rih	118	(3)
2016–2017	MFC Mykolaiv	29	(0)
2017–2023	Inhulets Petrove	91	(2)
- * Club domestic league appearances and goals as of 31 July 2023

Vitaliy Pavlov (born 25 June 1988) is a Ukrainian professional footballer who plays as a midfielder.
