= Ihor Medynskyi =

Ukrainian footballer

Personal information
- Full name: Ihor Mykolayovych Medynskyi
- Date of birth: 3 January 1993 (age 33)
- Place of birth: Ustechko, Zalishchyky Raion, Ternopil Oblast, Ukraine
- Height: 1.73 m (5 ft 8 in)
- Position: Right winger

Team information
- Current team: Obolon Kyiv
- Number: 13

Youth career
- 2008–2010: Ternopil

Senior career*
Years	Team	Apps	(Gls)
2010–2014	Dynamo-2 Kyiv	71	(9)
2014–2015	Ternopil	28	(2)
2015–2017	Cherkaskyi Dnipro	52	(5)
2017–2018	Sumy	18	(0)
2018	Poltava	8	(0)
2018–2022	Obolon Kyiv	97	(14)
2022–2023	Karlovac 1919	0	(0)
2023–	Obolon Kyiv	55	(0)
- * Club domestic league appearances and goals as of 3 June 2026

Ihor Mykolayovych Medynskyi (Ukrainian: Ігор Миколайович Мединський; born 3 January 1993) is a Ukrainian professional footballer who plays as a right winger for Obolon Kyiv.
