= Pylyp Budkivskyi =

Ukrainian footballer (born 1992)

Pylyp Budkivskyi Пилип Будківський
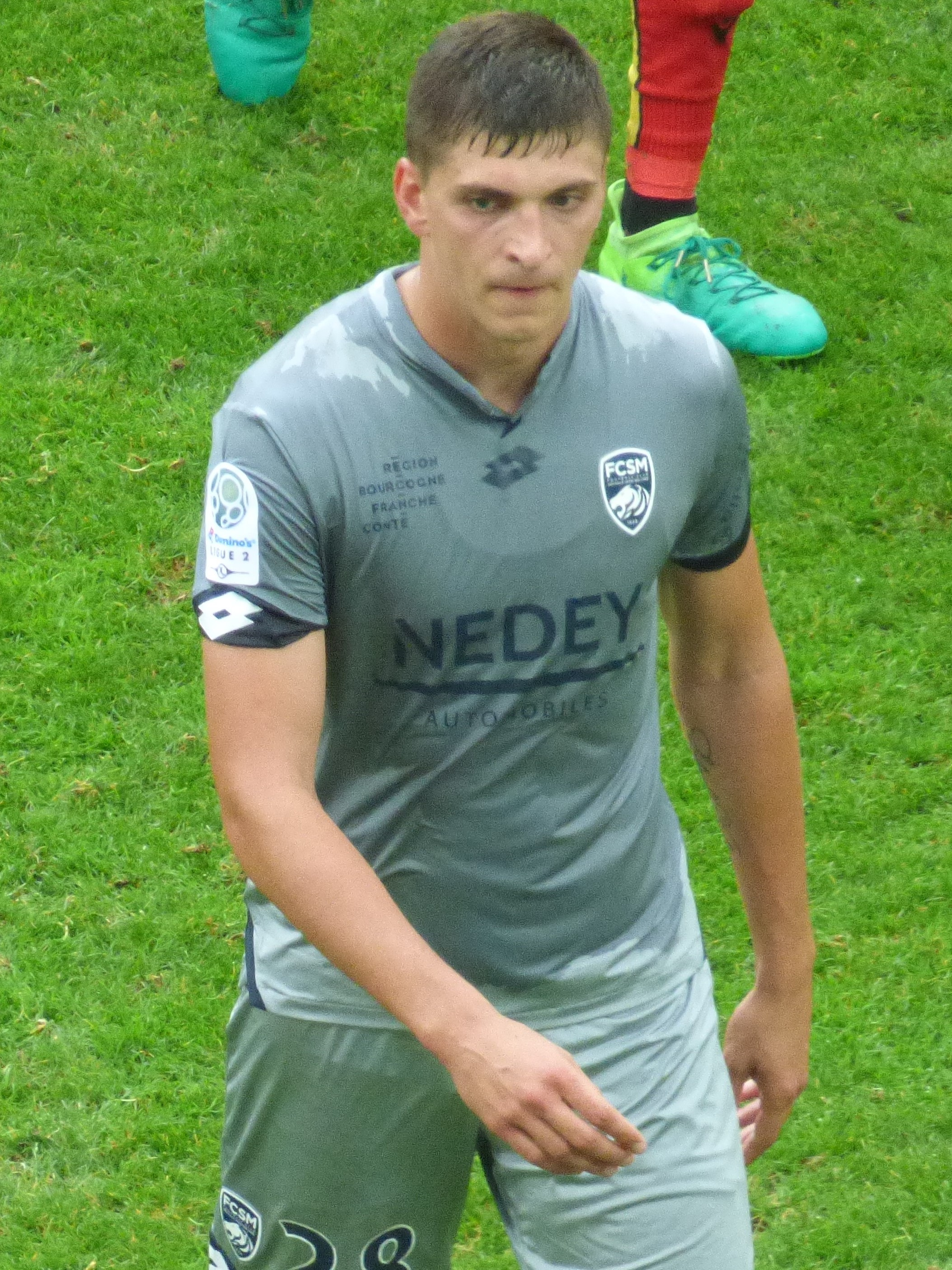
- Budkivskyi with Sochaux in 2018

Personal information
- Full name: Pylyp Vyacheslavovych Budkivskyi
- Date of birth: 10 March 1992 (age 34)
- Place of birth: Kyiv, Ukraine
- Height: 1.96 m (6 ft 5 in)
- Position: Striker

Team information
- Current team: Zorya Luhansk
- Number: 28

Youth career
- 2005–2006: FC Vidradnyi Kyiv
- 2006–2009: Shakhtar Donetsk

Senior career*
Years	Team	Apps	(Gls)
2009–2019	Shakhtar Donetsk	0	(0)
2010–2013	→ Illichivets Mariupol (loan)	23	(1)
2013	→ Sevastopol (loan)	9	(2)
2014–2016	→ Zorya Luhansk (loan)	54	(22)
2016–2017	→ Anzhi Makhachkala (loan)	29	(4)
2017	→ Kortrijk (loan)	12	(1)
2018	→ Anzhi Makhachkala (loan)	7	(0)
2018	→ Sochaux (loan)	9	(0)
2019	Zorya Luhansk	15	(0)
2020–2021	Desna Chernihiv	47	(11)
2022–2024	Polissya Zhytomyr	39	(17)
2024–	Zorya Luhansk	54	(20)

International career^{‡}
2007–2008	Ukraine U16	6	(2)
2008–2009	Ukraine U17	10	(3)
2010	Ukraine U18	5	(0)
2010–2011	Ukraine U19	9	(3)
2011–2013	Ukraine U21	23	(18)
2014–2016	Ukraine	6	(0)
- * Club domestic league appearances and goals as of 3 June 2026 ‡ National team caps and goals as of 4 December 2020

Pylyp Vyacheslavovych Budkivskyi (Ukrainian: Пилип В'ячеславович Будківський; born 10 March 1992) is a Ukrainian professional footballer who plays as a striker for Zorya Luhansk.

In Russian and some Ukrainian media, he is also mentioned by Russian variation of his name as Filip.

== Career ==
From 2011 he played for FC Illichivets Mariupol on loan and in May 2012 he signed a 2-year contract with them to play in the Ukrainian Premier League.

=== Anzhi Makhachkala ===
In the 2017–18 transfer window he returned from a loan at Kortrijk and was sent on loan to Anzhi Makhachkala in the Russian Premier League.

=== Sochaux ===
In 2018 he was sent to Sochaux in France on loan.

=== Zorya Luhansk ===
In the winter window transfers he moved from Shakhtar Donetsk to Zorya Luhansk signed a contract of 2.5 years

=== Desna Chernihiv ===
In 2020 he moved to Desna Chernihiv. He scored his first goal for the side against Shakhtar Donetsk in July.

On 19 July, he scored against Zorya Luhansk and helped his team qualify for the 2020–21 Europa League third qualifying round for the first time in the club's history.

On 22 August Budkivskyi scored a goal in a 3–1 victory against Zorya Luhansk in the first match of the 2020–21 Ukrainian Premier League season.

On 7 November he scored the winning goal against FC Mynai at Obolon Arena in Kyiv.

On 1 August 2021 he opened his account for the 2021–22 Ukrainian Premier League season against FC Mariupol. On 22 December, Budkivskyi became a free agent.

=== Polissya Zhytomyr ===
In January 2022, he signed a contract for one and a half years with Polissya Zhytomyr in the Ukrainian First League. On 28 August he scored two goals away against Prykarpattia Ivano-Frankivsk, opening his account for the 2022–23 season.

=== Return to Zorya Luhansk ===
On 23 August 2024, Budkivskyi returned to Zorya Luhansk.

== International career ==
He played for the Ukraine under-21 side, earning 23 caps and scoring 18 goals. In 2014, he made his senior debut for Ukraine.

== Personal life ==
In March 2022, during the Siege of Chernihiv, Budkivskyi, together with other former Desna players raised money for the civilian population of the city of Chernihiv.

== Career statistics ==
=== Club ===
As of match played 25 May 2025

Club	Season	League			National cup (Note: Includes Ukrainian Cup, Russian Cup, Belgian Cup)		Europe		Other		Total	
Club	Season	Division	Apps	Goals	Apps	Goals	Apps	Goals	Apps	Goals	Apps	Goals
Shakhtar Donetsk	2009–10	Ukrainian Premier League	0	0	0	0	–		–		0	0
Mariupol (loan)	2010–11	Ukrainian Premier League	7	1	0	0	–		–		7	1
Mariupol (loan)	2011–12	Ukrainian Premier League	16	0	0	0	–		–		16	0
Mariupol (loan)	Total		23	1	0	0	–		–		23	1
Sevastopol (loan)	2013–14	Ukrainian Premier League	9	2	1	0	–		–		10	2
Zorya Luhansk (loan)	2013–14	Ukrainian Premier League	6	0	0	0	–		–		6	0
Zorya Luhansk (loan)	2014–15	Ukrainian Premier League	25	8	3	0	5 (Note: Appearances in UEFA Europa League)	1	–		33	9
Zorya Luhansk (loan)	2015–16	Ukrainian Premier League	23	14	7	3	4	0	–		34	17
Zorya Luhansk (loan)	Total		54	22	10	3	9	1	–		73	26
Anzhi Makhachkala (loan)	2016–17	Russian Premier League	29	4	2	2	–		–		31	6
Kortrijk (loan)	2017–18	Belgian First Division A	12	1	1	0	–		–		13	1
Anzhi Makhachkala (loan)	2017–18	Russian Premier League	7	0	0	0	–		2 (Note: Appearances in Russian Premier League relegation play-offs)	0	9	0
Sochaux (loan)	2018–19	Ligue 2	9	0	0	0	–		2 (Note: Appearances in Ligue 2 relegation play-offs)	0	11	0
Zorya Luhansk	2018–19	Ukrainian Premier League	4	0	2	0	–		9	1	15	1
Zorya Luhansk	2019–20	Ukrainian Premier League	11	0	1	0	4	0	–		16	0
Zorya Luhansk	Total		15	0	3	0	4	0	9	1	31	1
Desna Chernihiv	2019–20	Ukrainian Premier League	13	3	1	0	–		–		14	3
Desna Chernihiv	2020–21	Ukrainian Premier League	16	7	2	0	1	0	–		18	7
Desna Chernihiv	2021–22	Ukrainian Premier League	18	1	1	0	–		–		19	1
Desna Chernihiv	Total		47	11	4	0	–		–		51	11
Polissya Zhytomyr	2021–22	Ukrainian First League	0	0	0	0	0	0	0	0	0	0
Polissya Zhytomyr	2022–23	Ukrainian First League	21	13	2	1	–		–		23	14
Polissya Zhytomyr	2023–24	Ukrainian Premier League	18	4	0	0	–		–		18	4
Polissya Zhytomyr	2024–25	Ukrainian Premier League	0	0	0	0	2	0	0	0	2	0
Polissya Zhytomyr	Total		39	17	2	0	2	0	–		43	17
Zorya Luhansk	2024–25	Ukrainian Premier League	26	8	1	0	–		–		26	8
Career total			204	59	20	5	12	1	13	1	247	66

== Honours ==
Polissya Zhytomyr

- Ukrainian First League: 2022–23

Zorya Luhansk

- Ukrainian Cup runner-up: 2015–16

Individual

- Ukraine U21 Top scorer: 18 goals

== Gallery ==
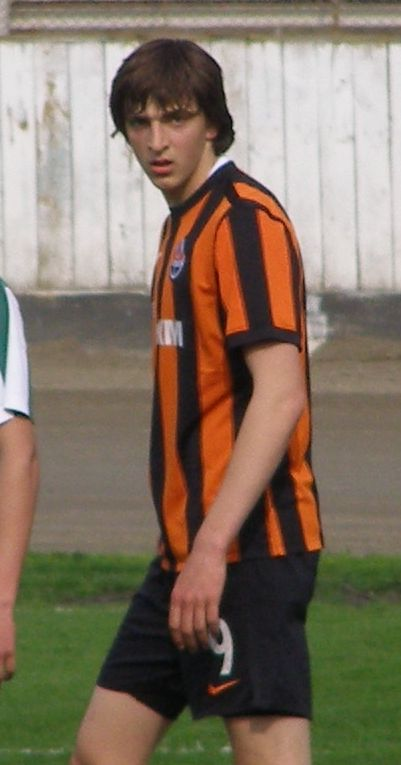
Budkivskyi playing for Shakhtar Donetsk

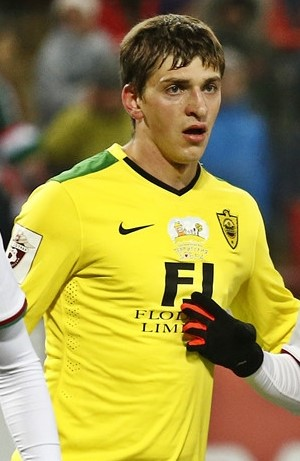
Budkivskyi playing for Anzhi Makhachkala
