= Vitaliy Ryabushko =

Ukrainian footballer

Personal information
- Full name: Vitaliy Vitaliyovych Ryabushko
- Date of birth: 24 March 1992 (age 34)
- Place of birth: Poltava, Ukraine
- Height: 1.71 m (5 ft 7 1/2 in)
- Position: Forward

Youth career
- 2003: Horpynka Sports School Poltava
- 2005–2007: FC Molod Poltava
- 2008–2010: Dynamo Academy/Dynamo-d
- 2011–2012: Vorskla-d/Vorskla U21

Senior career*
Years	Team	Apps	(Gls)
2012–2014	Vorskla Poltava	0	(0)
2013	→ Kremin Kremenchuk (loan)	6	(0)
2015–2016	Skala Stryi	53	(11)
2017–2018	Inhulets Petrove	29	(0)
2018	Mykolaiv	5	(0)

International career^{‡}
2009	Ukraine U17	16	(4)
2011	Ukraine U19	7	(0)
- * Club domestic league appearances and goals as of 13 November 2018 ‡ National team caps and goals as of 24 April 2016

Vitaliy Ryabushko (Ukrainian: Віталій Віталійович Рябушко, born 24 March 1992) is a professional Ukrainian football forward.
