= Hornostaivka =

Hornostaivka (Ukrainian: Горностаївка) may refer to several inhabited places in Ukraine:

- Hornostaivka, an urban-type settlement in Kherson Oblast
- Hornostaivka, Crimea, a village in Crimea
- Hornostaivka, Henichesk Raion, Kherson Oblast, a village in Henicheck Raion, Kherson Oblast
- Hornostaivka, Chernihiv Oblast, a village in Chernihiv Oblast
