= Pavlo Ivanov =

Ukrainian footballer

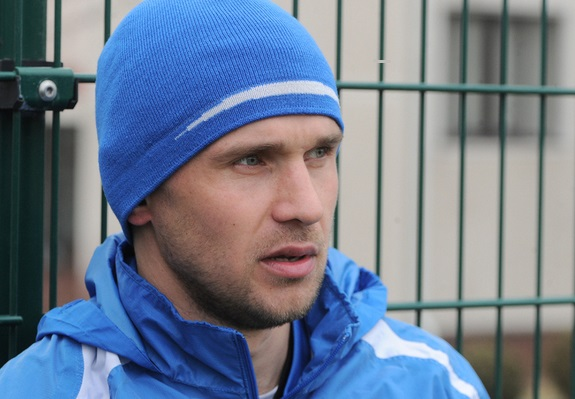

Personal information
- Full name: Pavlo Oleksandrovych Ivanov
- Date of birth: 28 September 1984 (age 42)
- Place of birth: Kyiv, Ukrainian SSR
- Height: 1.81 m (5 ft 11 1/2 in)
- Position: Defender

Youth career
- 1998–2001: Zmina-Obolon Kyiv

Senior career*
Years	Team	Apps	(Gls)
2001–2002	Dnipro Dnipropetrovsk	0	(0)
2001	→ Dnipro-2 Dnipropetrovsk	1	(0)
2001	→ Dnipro-3 Dnipropetrovsk	15	(2)
2002	Nafkom-Akademia Irpen	4	(0)
2003	Yednist' Plysky	7	(0)
2004–2005	Obolon Kyiv	13	(0)
2004	→ Krasyliv-Obolon Krasyliv	2	(1)
2004–2005	→ Obolon-2 Kyiv	7	(0)
2005–2006	MTZ-RIPO Minsk	3	(0)
2006	Belshina Bobruisk	11	(0)
2007	Yednist' Plysky	6	(0)
2009–2010	Bukovyna Chernivtsi	35	(1)
2011–2015	Olimpik Donetsk	98	(0)
2015	Zaria Bălți	0	(0)
2015–2016	Hoverla Uzhhorod	14	(1)
2016	Hirnyk-Sport Komsomolsk	6	(0)
2017	Sumy	13	(0)
2017–2018	Poltava	27	(0)
2018	Polissya Zhytomyr	17	(0)
- * Club domestic league appearances and goals as of 18 January 2019

Pavlo Ivanov (Ukrainian: Павло Олександрович Іванов; born 28 September 1984) is a Ukrainian former football defender.

Ivanov is a product of the FC Zmina-Obolon Kyiv youth sport school and spent time playing for different Ukrainian and Belarusian teams. In 2011, he signed a contract with FC Olimpik Donetsk.
