= 2021 Ukrainian Cup final =

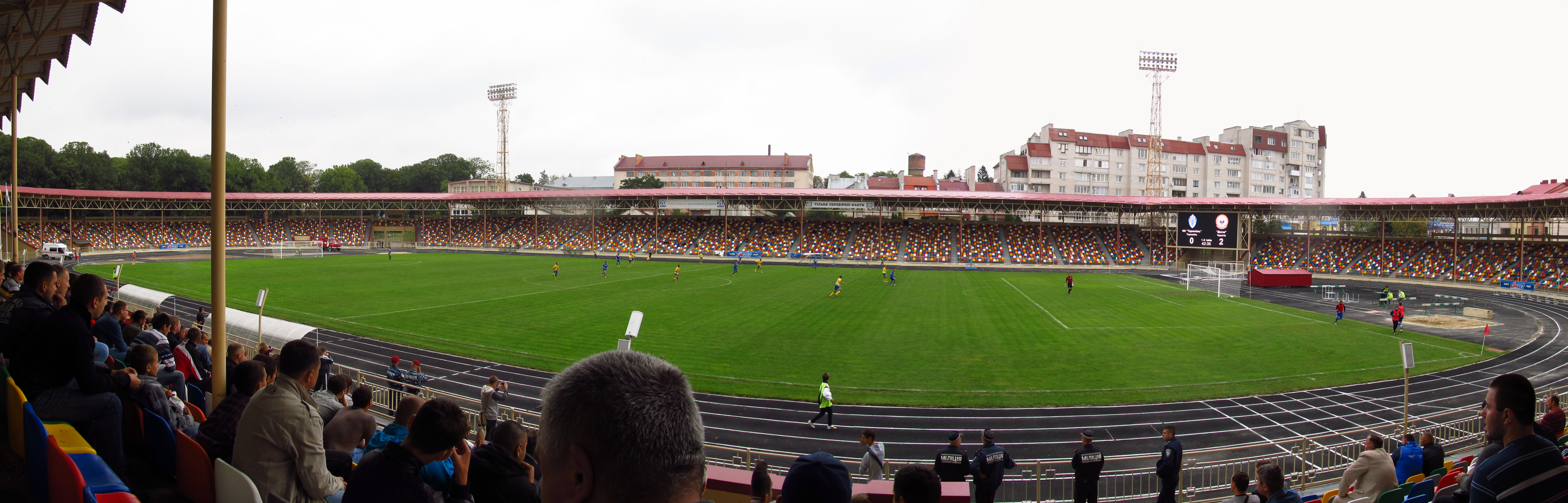
- Event: 2020–21 Ukrainian Cup
Dynamo Kyiv	Zorya Luhansk
1	0
- Date: 13 May 2021
- Venue: Ternopil City Stadium, Ternopil
- Referee: Yuriy Ivanov
- Attendance: 3,000

The 2021 Ukrainian Cup final decided the winner of the 2020–21 Ukrainian Cup, the 30th season of the annual Ukrainian football cup competition. It was played on 13 May 2021 at the Ternopil City Stadium between Dynamo Kyiv and Zorya Luhansk. It was the first time the cup final was held in Ternopil. On 4 March 2021, it was decided that the nominal host of the final would be Dynamo.

The Ukrainian Association of Football assured that the stadium would host the 2021 Ukrainian Cup Final after the 2020 final, originally planned to be held on 13 May 2020 at Ternopil City Stadium, was postponed due to COVID-19 pandemic and moved to Arena Lviv, and then Metalist Stadium. On 5 March 2021, the Ternopil City Council adopted its decision to honor the stadium with a controversial historical Ukrainian Roman Shukhevych. The Ukrainian Association of Football initially did not adopt the new name, originally referring to it by its previous name.

On 30 April 2021 it was announced that UA:First would be main broadcaster of the game. Before the start of the game, teams commemorated Valeriy Lobanovsky, who died on 13 May 2002, with a minute of silence.

== Road to the final ==
Zorya started its campaign in the Round of 16, while Dynamo in the Quarterfinals.

Note: In all results below, the score of the finalist is given first (H: home; A: away).

Dynamo Kyiv		Round	Zorya Luhansk
Opponent	Result	2020–21 Ukrainian Cup	Opponent	Result
bye		Round of 16	Desna Chernihiv	1–0 (A)
Kolos Kovalivka	0–0 (H) (a.e.t.), (4–3 p)	Quarter-finals	Veres Rivne	1–2 (A)
Ahrobiznes Volochysk	3–0 (A)	Semi-finals	Oleksandriya	1–1 (A) (a.e.t.), (4–3 p)

=== Dynamo Kyiv ===
As a Ukrainian Premier League team, Dynamo entered the competition in the quarter-finals with a home match against fellow Ukrainian Premier League side Kolos Kovalivka. Dynamo won on penalties 4–3 after tying at 0. In the semi-finals at Ternopil City Stadium, they played Ukrainian First League team Ahrobiznes Volochysk which was a conditional host. Dynamo won 3–0 with goals from Bohdan Lyednyev, Artem Besyedin, Vitaliy Buyalskyi and reached their fourth final in five years.

=== Zorya Luhansk ===
As a Premier League team, Zorya Luhansk started in the Round of 16, away at Ukrainian Premier League side Desna Chernihiv. At the Valeriy Lobanovskyi Dynamo Stadium in Kyiv, Zorya Luhansk won 1–0 with a penalty goal from Vladlen Yurchenko. In the quarter-finals, they were drawn away at Ukrainian First League team Veres Rivne and won 2–1 at the Avanhard Stadium in Lutsk due to goals from Dmytro Ivanisenia and Vladyslav Kocherhin. In the semi-finals at away CSC Nika Stadium, they played fellow Ukrainian Premier League FC Oleksandriya and reached their second final with a 4–3 penalty shootout win after tying at 1 in regulation time with a Kocherhin goal.

== Previous encounters ==
In overall, games between teams started during the Soviet epoch, Dynamo Kyiv and Zorya Luhansk have previously met 81 times, from which 51 were won by Dynamo, 22 were drawn and 8 won by Zorya. In domestic cup competitions they first met back in 1970. Including games of the Soviet Cup and Ukrainian Cup both teams met 7 times, from which 6 were won by Dynamo and 1 won by Zorya. This final is the second meeting of two clubs at this stage, which previously met in 1974 as part of the Soviet Cup when Dynamo beat Zorya in extra time.

As part of Ukrainian Cup competitions (since 1992), both clubs met four times all of which were won by Dynamo. The first time they met only in 2008, twice in 2015 and again in 2016.

For Dynamo Kyiv, this final was the 18th overall, with 12 wins in the previous 17 final appearances. Zorya is playing in their second Ukrainian Cup Final after 2016, when they lost to Shakhtar Donetsk 0–2.

=== Teams at the competition's finals ===
Team	Previous finals appearances (bold indicates winners)
Dynamo Kyiv	17 (**1993**, **1996**, **1998**, **1999**, **2000**, 2002, **2003**, **2005**, **2006**, **2007**, 2008, 2011, **2014**, **2015**, 2017, 2018, **2020**)
Zorya Luhansk	1 (2016)

Beside the Ukrainian Cup, both teams also competed at the Soviet Cup before 1992 and have reached finals on several occasions. Once in 1974 both teams met in the Soviet Cup Final at Luzhniki Stadium in Moscow (today in the Russian Federation). In total Dynamo and Zorya met three times including one final game.

== Match ==
13 May 2021
19:00 EEST (UTC+03:00)
Final

Dynamo Kyiv	1 – 0 (a.e.t.)	Zorya Luhansk
Tsyhankov 98'	Report (in Ukrainian); Report (in English)

Roman Shukhevych Ternopil city stadium, Ternopil
Attendance: 3,000
Referee: Yuriy Ivanov (Makiivka, Donetsk Oblast)

Dynamo Kyiv	Zorya Luhansk

Dynamo Kyiv:
GK	71	(Ukraine) Denys Boyko
DF	94	(Poland) Tomasz Kędziora	(yellow card) 67'
DF	4	(Ukraine) Denys Popov
DF	25	(Ukraine) Illya Zabarnyi
DF	16	(Ukraine) Vitalii Mykolenko	(substituted off) 11'
MF	5	(Ukraine) Serhiy Sydorchuk (c)	(yellow card) 90+2'
MF	10	(Ukraine) Mykola Shaparenko	(yellow card) 35'
MF	15	(Ukraine) Viktor Tsyhankov
MF	22	(Luxembourg) Gerson Rodrigues	(substituted off) 118'
MF	29	(Ukraine) Vitaliy Buyalskyi	(substituted off) 113'
FW	41	(Ukraine) Artem Besyedin
Substitutes:
GK	1	(Ukraine) Heorhiy Bushchan
MF	14	(Uruguay) Carlos de Pena	(substituted in) 118'
MF	17	(Ukraine) Bohdan Lyednyev
MF	19	(Ukraine) Denys Harmash	(substituted in) 113'
DF	20	(Ukraine) Oleksandr Karavayev	(substituted in) 11'
DF	23	(Brazil) Sidcley
DF	24	(Ukraine) Oleksandr Tymchyk
FW	30	(Ukraine) Vladyslav Vanat
DF	34	(Ukraine) Oleksandr Syrota
Coach:
(Romania) Mircea Lucescu

Zorya Luhansk:
GK	23	(Bosnia and Herzegovina) Nikola Vasilj
DF	45	(Ukraine) Denys Favorov
DF	21	(Ukraine) Dmytro Ivanisenya	(yellow card) 111'
DF	15	(Ukraine) Vitaliy Vernydub (c)	(yellow card) 14'
DF	6	(Brazil) Juninho	(yellow card) 90+4'
MF	29	(Ukraine) Yehor Nazaryna	(substituted off) 63'
MF	10	(Ukraine) Dmytro Khomchenovskyi
MF	7	(Ukraine) Vladyslav Kocherhin	(yellow card) 75'
MF	80	(Ukraine) Vladlen Yurchenko	(yellow card) 52'	(substituted off) 117'
FW	22	(Ukraine) Vladyslav Kabayev	(substituted off) 82'
FW	28	(Ukraine) Artem Hromov	(substituted off) 90+3'
Substitutes:
GK	30	(Ukraine) Mykyta Shevchenko
DF	5	(North Macedonia) Agron Rufati
DF	20	(Israel) Joel Abu Hanna
MF	97	(Latvia) Andrejs Cigaņiks
MF	4	(Croatia) Lovro Cvek	(substituted in) 117'
MF	8	(Ukraine) Maksym Lunyov
FW	11	(Ukraine) Oleksandr Hladkyy	(substituted in) 82'
FW	90	(Iran) Allahyar Sayyadmanesh	(substituted in) 63'	(yellow card) 90+2'
FW	9	(Iran) Shahab Zahedi	(substituted in) 90+3'
Coach:
(Ukraine) Viktor Skrypnyk

MAN OF THE MATCH

MATCH OFFICIALS

- Assistant referees:
  - V.Matiash (Donetsk)
  - S.Shlonchak (Cherkasy)
- Fourth official:
  - O.Shandor (Lviv)
- Reserved assistant referee:
  - A.Skrypka (Kropyvnytskyi)
- Supervisor of refereeing:
  - I.Khiblin (Khmelnytskyi)
- Video assistant referee (VAR):
  - Kateryna Monzul (Kharkiv)
- VAR assistant:
  - M.Striletska (Sumy)
- VAR supervisor:
  - S.Lysenchuk (Kyiv)
- UAF game delegate
  - H.Prokopovych (Chernihiv)
- UAF security officer
  - M.Pykhtin (Mykolaiv).

MATCH RULES

- 90 minutes.
- 30 minutes of extra-time if necessary.
- Penalty shoot-out if scores still level.
- Nine named substitutes.
- Maximum of 5 substitutions.

- Note: position and roster number is per the Ukrainian Premier League (and Footboom)
