= 2019–20 FC Zorya Luhansk season =

Zorya Luhansk
2019–20 season
- President: Yevhen Heller
- Manager: Viktor Skrypnyk
- Stadium: Slavutych Arena, Zaporizhia
- Ukrainian Premier League: 3rd
- Ukrainian Cup: Round of 16 (1/8)
- UEFA Europa League: Play-off
- Top goalscorer: League: Bohdan Lyednyev (11); All: Bohdan Lyednyev (13)
- Highest home attendance: 10,181 (vs RCD Espanyol, 29 August 2019)
- Lowest home attendance: 0 (all home matches were played behind closed doors starting 15 March 2020)
- Average home league attendance: 1,903
Home colours	Away colours

The 2018–19 season was 19th season in the top Ukrainian football league for Zorya Luhansk. Zorya competed in Premier League, Ukrainian Cup and UEFA Europa League.

== Players ==
=== Squad information ===
As of 19 July 2020

Squad no.	Name	Nationality	Position	Date of birth (age)
Goalkeepers
1	Zauri Makharadze	(Georgia (country)) (Ukraine)	GK	24 March 1993 (aged 27)
23	Nikola Vasilj	(Bosnia and Herzegovina) (Croatia)	GK	2 December 1995 (aged 24)
30	Mykyta Shevchenko	(Ukraine)	GK	26 January 1993 (aged 27)
53	Dmytro Matsapura ^{List B}	(Ukraine)	GK	10 March 2000 (aged 20)
Defenders
15	Vitaliy Vernydub	(Ukraine)	DF	17 October 1987 (aged 32)
18	Oleksandr Tymchyk (on loan from Dynamo Kyiv)	(Ukraine)	DF	20 January 1997 (aged 23)
20	Joel Abu Hanna ^{List B}	(Germany)	DF	22 January 1998 (aged 22)
77	Ihor Chaykovskyi	(Ukraine)	DF	7 October 1991 (aged 28)
Midfielders
4	Lovro Cvek	(Croatia)	MF	6 July 1995 (aged 25)
6	Mykyta Kamenyuka (Captain)	(Ukraine)	MF	3 June 1985 (aged 35)
7	Vladyslav Kocherhin	(Ukraine)	MF	30 April 1996 (aged 24)
10	Dmytro Khomchenovskyi	(Ukraine)	MF	16 April 1990 (aged 30)
14	Bohdan Mykhaylychenko	(Ukraine)	MF	21 March 1997 (aged 23)
17	Bohdan Lyednyev ^{List B} (on loan from Dynamo Kyiv)	(Ukraine)	MF	7 April 1998 (aged 22)
21	Dmytro Ivanisenya	(Ukraine)	MF	11 January 1994 (aged 26)
28	Artem Hromov	(Ukraine)	MF	14 January 1990 (aged 30)
29	Volodymyr Bilotserkovets ^{List B}	(Ukraine)	MF	22 January 2000 (aged 20)
48	Maksym Kazakov	(Ukraine)	MF	6 February 1996 (aged 24)
64	Serhiy Mayboroda ^{List B}	(Ukraine)	MF	21 November 1997 (aged 22)
80	Vladlen Yurchenko	(Ukraine)	MF	22 January 1994 (aged 26)
97	Andrejs Cigaņiks	(Latvia)	MF	12 April 1997 (aged 23)
98	Yevhen Cheberko	(Ukraine)	MF	23 January 1998 (aged 22)
Forwards
8	Maksym Lunyov ^{List B}	(Ukraine)	FW	22 May 1998 (aged 22)
9	Mihailo Perović	(Montenegro)	FW	23 January 1997 (aged 23)
22	Vladyslav Kabayev	(Ukraine)	FW	1 September 1995 (aged 24)
	Nemanja Ivanović	(Serbia)	FW	14 May 1997 (aged 23)

== Transfers ==
=== In ===
Date	Pos.	Player	Age	Moving from	Type	Fee	Source
Summer
1 July 2019	MF	(Ukraine) Bohdan Mykhaylychenko	22	(Ukraine) Dynamo Kyiv	Transfer	Undisclosed	
16 July 2019	GK	(Bosnia and Herzegovina) Nikola Vasilj	23	(Germany) Nürnberg	Transfer	Undisclosed	
16 July 2019	DF	(Germany) Joel Abu Hanna	21	(Germany) Magdeburg	Transfer	Undisclosed	
16 July 2019	DF	(Brazil) Lazio	23	(Brazil) Itapemirim	Transfer	Undisclosed	
16 July 2019	DF	(Ukraine) Dmytro Ivanisenya	25	(Georgia (country)) Dinamo Tbilisi	Transfer	Undisclosed	
17 July 2019	MF	(Ukraine) Vladlen Yurchenko	25	(Denmark) Vejle Boldklub	Transfer	Free	
1 July 2019	MF	(Ukraine) Stanislav Nechyporenko	22	(Ukraine) Avanhard Kramatorsk	Loan return		
1 July 2019	DF	(Ukraine) Mykhaylo Shershen	24	(Ukraine) Avanhard Kramatorsk	Loan return		
3 August 2019	FW	(Ukraine) Nazariy Rusyn	20	(Ukraine) Dynamo Kyiv	Loan		
Winter
16 January 2020	MF	(Latvia) Andrejs Cigaņiks	22	(Latvia) RFS	Transfer	Free	
16 January 2020	MF	(Croatia) Lovro Cvek	24	(Slovakia) Senica	Transfer	Undisclosed	
24 January 2020	FW	(Montenegro) Mihailo Perović	23	(Montenegro) Budućnost Podgorica	Transfer	Undisclosed	
31 December 2019	MF	(Ukraine) Vladyslav Yemets	22	(Ukraine) Avanhard Kramatorsk	Loan return		
31 December 2019	FW	(Brazil) Rafael Ratão	24	(Slovakia) Slovan Bratislava	Loan return		
3 July 2020	MF	(Brazil) Silas	24	(Israel) Hapoel Ironi Kiryat Shmona	Loan return		

=== Out ===
Date	Pos.	Player	Age	Moving to	Type	Fee	Source
Summer
27 June 2019	MF	(Ukraine) Oleksandr Karavayev	27	(Ukraine) Dynamo Kyiv	Transfer	Undisclosed	
1 July 2019	GK	(Ukraine) Oleh Chuvayev	31	Unattached	Transfer	Free	
1 July 2019	DF	(Ukraine) Vyacheslav Checher	38	Retired	Transfer	Free	
11 July 2019	DF	(Ukraine) Mykhaylo Shershen	24	(Ukraine) Metalist 1925 Kharkiv	Transfer / Loan?	Undisclosed	
25 July 2019	DF	(Ukraine) Stanislav Nechyporenko	24	(Ukraine) Kremin Kremenchuk	Transfer / Loan?	Undisclosed	
31 June 2019	MF	(Ukraine) Bohdan Mykhaylychenko	22	(Ukraine) Dynamo Kyiv	Loan return		
31 June 2019	FW	(Colombia) Leonardo Acevedo	23	(Portugal) Sporting CP	Loan return		
19 July 2019	MF	(Ukraine) Ihor Zahoruyko	20	(Ukraine) Metalurh Zaporizhya	Loan		
29 August 2019	MF	(Brazil) Silas	23	(Israel) Hapoel Ironi Kiryat Shmona	Loan		
Winter
31 December 2019	MF	(Japan) Itsuki Urata	22	Unattached	Transfer	Free	
1 January 2020	FW	(Brazil) Rafael Ratão	24	(Slovakia) Slovan Bratislava	Transfer	Free	
2 January 2020	GK	(Brazil) Luiz Felipe	22	(Brazil) Aimoré	Transfer	Free	
3 January 2020	MF	(Ukraine) Levan Arveladze	26	(Ukraine) Desna Chernihiv	Transfer	Undisclosed	
6 January 2020	FW	(Ukraine) Pylyp Budkivskyi	27	(Ukraine) Desna Chernihiv	Transfer	Undisclosed	
8 February 2020	MF	(Brazil) Mateus Norton	23	Unattached	Transfer	Free	
10 February 2020	DF	(Ukraine) Dmytro Lytvyn	23	(Ukraine) Olimpik Donetsk	Transfer	Free	
22 May 2020	DF	(Brazil) Lazio	24	Unattached	Transfer	Free	
9 July 2020	MF	(Brazil) Silas	24	(Belarus) Dinamo Minsk	Transfer	Undisclosed	
31 December 2019	FW	(Ukraine) Nazariy Rusyn	21	(Ukraine) Dynamo Kyiv	Loan return		
16 January 2020	FW	(Ukraine) Vladyslav Yemets	22	(Ukraine) Kolos Kovalivka	Loan		
23 January 2020	DF	(Ukraine) Tymofiy Sukhar	20	(Ukraine) Metalurh Zaporizhya	Loan		
23 January 2020	MF	(Ukraine) Yehor Shalfeyev	21	(Ukraine) Metalurh Zaporizhya	Loan		
8 February 2020	DF	(Ukraine) Maksym Bilyi	29	(Ukraine) Rukh Lviv	Loan		

== Pre-season and friendlies ==
24 June 2019 Friendly	Zorya Luhansk (Ukraine)	2–0	(Ukraine) Skoruk Tomakivka	Zaporizhia
15:00 EEST (UTC+03:00)	Shalfeyev 17'; Urata 62'	Report		Stadium: Metalurh train base

24 June 2019 Friendly	Zorya Luhansk (Ukraine)	1–1	(Ukraine) SC Dnipro-1	Zaporizhia
18:00 EEST (UTC+03:00)	Lyednyev 70'	Report	Orinchak 32'	Stadium: Metalurh train base

1 July 2019 Friendly	Zorya Luhansk (Ukraine)	3–0	(North Macedonia) Shkëndija	Lesce
18:00 EEST (UTC+03:00)	Kocherhin 19'; Shalfeyev 89'; Hromov 90'	Report		Stadium: Štadion Na Žagi

4 July 2019 Friendly	Zorya Luhansk (Ukraine)	1–1	(Croatia) Hajduk Split	Slovenia
19:00 EEST (UTC+03:00)	Abu Hanna 51'	Report	Simić 40'

7 July 2019 Friendly	Zorya Luhansk (Ukraine)	Cancelled	(Serbia) Proleter Novi Sad	Slovenia
EEST (UTC+03:00)		Report

8 July 2019 Friendly	Zorya Luhansk (Ukraine)	1–4	(Croatia) Osijek	Slovenia
13:00 EEST (UTC+03:00)	Shalfeyev 84'	Report	Dugandžić 6', 18'; Špoljarić 8'; Lyopa 36'

9 July 2019 Friendly	Zorya Luhansk (Ukraine)	1–2	(Poland) Śląsk Wrocław	Slovenia
17:30 EEST (UTC+03:00)	Kabayev 35'	Report	Pich 39'; Cholewiak 79'

12 July 2019 Friendly	Zorya Luhansk (Ukraine)	1–1	(Hungary) Paks	Slovenia
17:30 EEST (UTC+03:00)	Kocherhin 17'	Report	Papp 21'

18 July 2019 Friendly	Zorya Luhansk (Ukraine)	3–1	(Ukraine) FC Mariupol	Zaporizhia
17:30 EEST (UTC+03:00)	Mykhaylychenko 10'; Vernydub 52'; Budkivskyi 73'	Report	Churko 58'	Stadium: Torpedo Stadium

12 October 2019 Friendly	Zorya Luhansk (Ukraine)	3–1	(Ukraine) FC Mariupol	Zaporizhia
15:00 EEST (UTC+03:00)	Kocherhin 57'; Lunyov 66'; Yurchenko 77'	Report	Vakula 37'	Stadium: Torpedo Stadium

17 November 2019 Friendly	SC Dnipro-1 (Ukraine)	2–2	(Ukraine) Zorya Luhansk	Dnipro
14:00 EEST (UTC+03:00)	Kohut 22'; Korkishko 56'	Report	Hromov 26'; Khomchenovskyi 57'	Stadium: Dnipro-Arena; Referee: Vitaliy Romanov

22 January 2020 Friendly	Zorya Luhansk (Ukraine)	4–0	(Kyrgyzstan) Neftchi Kochkor-Ata	Turkey
9:30 EET (UTC+02:00)	Khomchenovskyi 44'; Lunyov 71', 82'; Cvek 77'	Report

22 January 2020 Friendly	Zorya Luhansk (Ukraine)	1–0	(Poland) ŁKS Łódź	Turkey
14:00 EET (UTC+02:00)	Kocherhin 61'	Report

25 January 2020 Friendly	Zorya Luhansk (Ukraine)	0–0	(Poland) Piast Gliwice	Turkey
15:00 EET (UTC+02:00)		Report

29 January 2020 Friendly	Zorya Luhansk (Ukraine)	2–0	(Serbia) Voždovac	Turkey
16:30 EET (UTC+02:00)	Yurchenko 24'; Lyednyev 52'	Report

6 February 2020 Friendly	Zorya Luhansk (Ukraine)	3–0	(Kazakhstan) Ordabasy	Turkey
16:00 EET (UTC+02:00)	Kabayev 44', 50'; Cigaņiks 75'	Report

9 February 2020 Friendly	Zorya Luhansk (Ukraine)	1–0	(Kosovo) Flamurtari Pristina	Turkey
10:00 EET (UTC+02:00)	Bilotserkovets 75'	Report

10 February 2020 Friendly	Zorya Luhansk (Ukraine)	4–0	(Bosnia and Herzegovina) Željezničar Sarajevo	Turkey
16:30 EET (UTC+02:00)	Lyednyev 22', 39'; Kocherhin 29', 62'	Report

14 February 2020 Friendly	Zorya Luhansk (Ukraine)	0–0	(Belarus) Torpedo-BelAZ Zhodino	Turkey
15:00 EET (UTC+02:00)		Report

== Competitions ==
=== Overall ===
Competition	First match	Last match	Starting round	Final position	Record							
Competition	First match	Last match	Starting round	Final position	Pld	W	D	L	GF	GA	GD	Win %
Ukrainian Premier League	28 July 2019	19 July 2020	Matchday 1	3rd	32	17	7	8	50	29	+21	53.13
Ukrainian Cup	30 October 2019	30 October 2019	Round of 16 (1/8)	Round of 16 (1/8)	1	0	1	0	1	1	+0	0.00
UEFA Europa League	25 July 2019	29 August 2019	2Q	Play-off	6	3	2	1	9	7	+2	50.00
Total					39	20	10	9	60	37	+23	51.28

Last updated: 19 July 2020
Source: Competitions

=== Premier League ===
==== League table ====
Pos	Team	Pld	W	D	L	GF	GA	GD	Pts	Qualification or relegation
1	Shakhtar Donetsk (C)	32	26	4	2	80	26	+54	82	Qualification for the Champions League group stage
2	Dynamo Kyiv	32	18	5	9	65	35	+30	59	Qualification for the Champions League third qualifying round
3	Zorya Luhansk	32	17	7	8	50	29	+21	58	Qualification for the Europa League group stage
4	Desna Chernihiv	32	17	5	10	59	33	+26	56	Qualification for the Europa League third qualifying round
5	FC Oleksandriya	32	14	7	11	49	47	+2	49	Qualification for the playoff for Europa League second qualifying round

Source: Ukrainian Premier League, UEFA, Soccerway
Rules for classification: 1) Points; 2) Head-to-head points; 3) Head-to-head goal difference; 4) Head-to-head higher number of goals scored; 5) Goal difference; 6) Higher number of goals scored; 7) Draw or "golden match" if tied for title (Article 22, paragraph 3).
(C) Champions

==== Results summary ====
Overall								Home						Away					
Pld	W	D	L	GF	GA	GD	Pts	W	D	L	GF	GA	GD	W	D	L	GF	GA	GD
32	17	7	8	50	29	+21	58	8	5	3	24	15	+9	9	2	5	26	14	+12

Last updated: 19 July 2020.
Source: Competitive matches

==== Results by round ====
Round	1	2	3	4	5	6	7	8	9	10	11	12	13	14	15	16	17	18	19	20	21	22	23	24	25	26	27	28	29	30	31	32
Ground	A	H	A	H	A	H	A	H	A	A	H	H	A	H	A	H	A	H	A	H	H	A	H	A	H	H	A	A	H	A	A	H
Result	W	D	W	L	W	D	L	D	W	D	W	W	W	W	L	W	W	L	W	W	W	L	W	L	W	L	W	D	D	W	L	D
Position	6	5	2	2	3	4	4	4	5	5	5	4	4	2	3	3	2	3	3	2	2	3	2	2	2	3	2	3	4	3	3	3

Updated to match(es) played on 19 July 2020. Source: Competitive matches
A = Away; H = Home; W = Win; D = Draw; L = Loss

==== Matches ====
28 July 2019 1	Vorskla Poltava	0–1	Zorya Luhansk	Poltava
14:00 EEST (UTC+03:00)	Habelok (yellow card) 13'; Kolomoyets (yellow card) 55'; Šehić (yellow card) 88'	Report	Lyednyev 3', (yellow card) 67'; Mykhaylychenko (yellow card) 6'; Budkivskyi (yellow card) 10'; Vernydub (yellow card) 14'; Khomchenovskyi (yellow card) 49'	Stadium: Vorskla Stadium; Attendance: 2,647; Referee: Dmytro Kutakov

4 August 2019 2	Zorya Luhansk	1–1	SC Dnipro-1	Zaporizhia
19:30 EEST (UTC+03:00)	Vernydub (yellow card) 26'; Khomchenovskyi (yellow card) 50'; Cheberko (yellow card) 51'; Kocherhin 70'	Report	Safronov (yellow card) 38'; Batahov (yellow card) 40'; Nazarenko (yellow card) 44'; Kohut (yellow card) 45', (goal) 45+2'; Klishchuk (yellow card) 82'	Stadium: Slavutych-Arena; Attendance: 1,515; Referee: Volodymyr Novokhatniy

11 August 2019 3	Kolos Kovalivka	1–3	Zorya Luhansk	Kyiv
17:00 EEST (UTC+03:00)	Zadoya (yellow card) 1'; Milko (yellow card) 26'; Kostyshyn 34'; Morozko (yellow card) 56'; Zozulya (yellow card) 80'	Report	Lyednyev 27', (yellow card) 90+2'; Rusyn 45+1'; Kabayev 46'	Stadium: Obolon Arena; Attendance: 4,420; Referee: Oleksandr Omelchenko

18 August 2019 4	Zorya Luhansk	1–2	FC Oleksandriya	Zaporizhia
19:30 EEST (UTC+03:00)	Tymchyk (yellow card) 31'; Cheberko (yellow card) 59'; Rusyn (yellow card) 71'; Abu Hanna (yellow card) 83'; Lyednyev 88'	Report	Banada (yellow card) 22'; Luchkevych (yellow card) 36'; Kovalets 57', 75', (yellow card) 80'; Pashayev (yellow card) 70'	Stadium: Slavutych-Arena; Attendance: 1,974; Referee: Mykola Balakin

25 August 2019 5	Karpaty Lviv	0–1	Zorya Luhansk	Lviv
17:00 EEST (UTC+03:00)	Ponde (yellow card) 67'; Di Franco (yellow card) 67'	Report	Kamenyuka (yellow card) 52'; Budkivskyi 58', (yellow card) 89'; Khomchenovskyi (yellow card) 67'; Ivanisenya (yellow card) 79'; Bilyi (yellow card) 85'	Stadium: Ukraina Stadium; Attendance: 3,561; Referee: Oleksandr Derdo

1 September 2019 6	Zorya Luhansk	2–2	Dynamo Kyiv	Zaporizhia
19:30 EEST (UTC+03:00)	Hromov 42'; Mykhaylychenko (yellow card) 45+1'; Yurchenko (yellow card) 55'; Abu Hanna (yellow card) 67', (goal) 82'	Report	Rodrigues 18'; Harmash (yellow card) 32' de Pena 36'; Burda (yellow card) 50'; Tsyhankov (yellow card) 90+2'	Stadium: Slavutych-Arena; Attendance: 6,352; Referee: Kostiantyn Trukhanov

14 September 2019 7	Shakhtar Donetsk	4–3	Zorya Luhansk	Kharkiv
17:00 EEST (UTC+03:00)	Taison (yellow card) 12', (goal) 42'; Marlos 53'; Moraes 61', 89'; Stepanenko (yellow card) 77'	Report	Yurchenko 10'; Mykhaylychenko (yellow card) 24'; Kocherhin 35'; Ivanisenya (yellow card) 51'; Tymchyk (yellow card) 70'; Lyednyev 86'	Stadium: OSC Metalist; Attendance: 9,260; Referee: Vitaliy Romanov

21 September 2019 8	Zorya Luhansk	0–0	FC Mariupol	Zaporizhia
17:00 EEST (UTC+03:00)	Budkivskyi (yellow card) 6' (yellow-red card) 39'; Tymchyk (yellow card) 48'; Mykhaylychenko (yellow card) 75'; Ivanisenya (yellow card) 90'	Report	Fedorchuk (yellow card) 27' (yellow-red card) 31'; Bykov (yellow card) 90+2'	Stadium: Slavutych-Arena; Attendance: 1,875; Referee: Mykola Balakin

29 September 2019 9	Olimpik Donetsk	0–5	Zorya Luhansk	Kyiv
19:30 EEST (UTC+03:00)	Ksyonz (red card) 37'	Report	Yurchenko 40'; Abu Hanna (yellow card) 49'; Rusyn 53', 87'; Lyednyev 73'; Kabayev 80'; Cheberko (yellow card) 88'	Stadium: Dynamo Stadium; Attendance: 1,912; Referee: Serhiy Boyko

5 October 2019 10	FC Lviv	0–0	Zorya Luhansk	Lviv
19:30 EEST (UTC+03:00)	Pernambuco (yellow card) 30'; Pedro Vitor (red card) 37'; Zubkov (yellow card) 85'; Alvaro (yellow card) 90+3'	Report	Rusyn (yellow card) 51'; Vernydub (yellow card) 57'; Yurchenko (yellow card) 71'; Arveladze (yellow card) 84'; Mykhaylychenko (yellow card) 90'	Stadium: Ukraina Stadium; Attendance: 945; Referee: Volodymyr Novokhatniy

19 October 2019 11	Zorya Luhansk	2–1	Desna Chernihiv	Zaporizhia
17:00 EEST (UTC+03:00)	Kabayev (yellow card) 23'; Vernydub (yellow card) 50'; Lyednyev 80'; Yurchenko 85' (pen.)	Report	Artem Favorov (yellow card) 13'; Dehtyarov 17'; Kalitvintsev (yellow card) 84'	Stadium: Slavutych-Arena; Attendance: 2,375; Referee: Oleksandr Omelchenko

26 October 2019 12	Zorya Luhansk	4–0	Vorskla Poltava	Zaporizhia
17:00 EEST (UTC+03:00)	Rusyn 16'; Yurchenko 45+1'; Kabayev 61'; Lyednyev 77', (yellow card) 85'	Report	Bayenko (yellow card) 29' (yellow-red card) 55'; Melnychuk (yellow card) 44'; Vasin (yellow card) 45+1'	Stadium: Slavutych-Arena; Attendance: 2,687; Referee: Denys Shurman

3 November 2019 13	SC Dnipro-1	1–4	Zorya Luhansk	Dnipro
14:00 EET (UTC+02:00)	Batahov (yellow card) 35'; Polyovyi (yellow card) 52'; Korkishko 59'; Kohut (yellow card) 88'	Report	Kabayev 2'; Ivanisenya 22'; Kocherhin 73', (yellow card) 77'; Abu Hanna (yellow card) 77'; Lyednyev 83' (pen.); Tymchyk (yellow card) 85'	Stadium: Dnipro-Arena; Attendance: 2,715; Referee: Kostiantyn Trukhanov

10 November 2019 14	Zorya Luhansk	2–0	Kolos Kovalivka	Zaporizhia
14:00 EET (UTC+02:00)	Yurchenko 31' (pen.); Kabayev (yellow card) 61'; Kocherhin 90+1'	Report	Havrysh (yellow card) 30' (yellow-red card) 55'; Morozko (red card) 77'	Stadium: Slavutych-Arena; Attendance: 2,411; Referee: Yuriy Ivanov

23 November 2019 15	FC Oleksandriya	1–0	Zorya Luhansk	Oleksandriya
14:00 EET (UTC+02:00)	Banada (yellow card) 37', (goal) 60'; Bukhal (yellow card) 51'; Zaderaka (yellow card) 84'	Report	Mykhaylychenko (yellow card) 22'; Abu Hanna (yellow card) 90+2'	Stadium: CSC Nika Stadium; Attendance: 937; Referee: Dmytro Kutakov

30 November 2019 16	Zorya Luhansk	2–0	Karpaty Lviv	Zaporizhia
14:00 EET (UTC+02:00)	Vernydub 54'; Tymchyk (yellow card) 58'; Lyednyev (yellow card) 63'; Abu Hanna (yellow card) 66'; Kocherhin 87'	Report	da Graça (yellow card) 56'; Deda (yellow card) 59'	Stadium: Slavutych-Arena; Attendance: 1,675; Referee: Yaroslav Kozyk

8 December 2019 17	Dynamo Kyiv	1–2	Zorya Luhansk	Kyiv
17:00 EET (UTC+02:00)	Verbič 22', (yellow card) 66'; Kádár (yellow card) 33' (yellow-red card) 52'; Sydorchuk (yellow card) 85'	Report	Mykhaylychenko 6'; Khomchenovskyi 56', (yellow card) 90+4'; Cheberko (yellow card) 66'	Stadium: NSC Olimpiyskiy; Attendance: 8,814; Referee: Anatoliy Abdula

14 December 2019 18	Zorya Luhansk	1–2	Shakhtar Donetsk	Zaporizhia
17:00 EET (UTC+02:00)	Mykhaylychenko (yellow card) 3'; Abu Hanna (yellow card) 50'; Lyednyev (yellow card) 58', (goal) 61'; Ivanisenya (yellow card) 84'; Tymchyk (yellow card) 90'	Report	Marlos (yellow card) 12', (goal) 84' (pen.); Alan Patrick (yellow card) 47'; Moraes 54', (yellow card) 72'	Stadium: Slavutych-Arena; Attendance: 5,317; Referee: Vitaliy Romanov

22 February 2020 19	FC Mariupol	1–2	Zorya Luhansk	Mariupol
14:00 EET (UTC+02:00)	Chekh (yellow card) 44'; Polehenko (yellow card) 59'; Ihnatenko (yellow card) 66'; Myshnyov 69'; Bykov (yellow card) 88'	Report	Cheberko (yellow card) 5'; Yurchenko (yellow card) 28'; Perović (yellow card) 41', (goal) 62'; Lyednyev (yellow card) 45', (goal) 67'; Tymchyk (yellow card) 86'; Vernydub (yellow card) 88'	Stadium: Volodymyr Boiko Stadium; Attendance: 1,570; Referee: Yaroslav Kozyk

1 March 2020 20	Zorya Luhansk	1–0	Olimpik Donetsk	Zaporizhia
14:00 EET (UTC+02:00)	Kocherhin (yellow card) 19'; Yurchenko (yellow card) 35'; Vernydub (yellow card) 60'; Kabayev 77'; Khomchenovskyi (yellow card) 85'; Mykhaylychenko (yellow card) 89'; Cheberko (yellow card) 90+6'	Report	Lebedenko (yellow card) 88'	Stadium: Slavutych-Arena; Attendance: 2,411; Referee: Serhiy Boyko

4 March 2020 21	Zorya Luhansk	2–0	FC Lviv	Zaporizhia
17:00 EET (UTC+02:00)	Kabayev 54', (yellow card) 74'; Tymchyk (yellow card) 70'; Cigaņiks (yellow card) 76'; Lyednyev 89'	Report	Honchar (yellow card) 32'; Borzenko (yellow card) 38'; Bohunov (yellow card) 40'; Alvaro (yellow card) 70'; Bratkov (yellow card) 87'	Stadium: Slavutych-Arena; Attendance: 1,857; Referee: Dmytro Bondarenko

7 March 2020 22	Desna Chernihiv	1–0	Zorya Luhansk	Chernihiv
14:00 EET (UTC+02:00)	Hutsulyak (red card) 20'; Filippov 37'; Budkivskyi (yellow card) 49'; Denys Favorov (yellow card) 69'	Report	Lunyov (red card) 45+3'; Mykhaylychenko (yellow card) 88'; Cigaņiks (yellow card) 90+3'	Stadium: Chernihiv Stadium; Attendance: 4,573; Referee: Kateryna Monzul

15 March 2020 23	Zorya Luhansk	1–0	Shakhtar Donetsk	Zaporizhia
14:00 EET (UTC+02:00)	Ivanisenya (yellow card) 14'; Kocherhin (yellow card) 34'; Cvek (yellow card) 59'; Mykhaylychenko (yellow card) 75', (goal) 83'	Report	Moraes (yellow card) 51'	Stadium: Slavutych-Arena; Attendance: 0 Referee: Anatoliy Abdula
Note: Match was played behind closed doors due to quarantine in Ukraine during COVID-19 pandemic.

30 May 2020 24	FC Oleksandriya	1–0	Zorya Luhansk	Oleksandriya
17:00 EET (UTC+02:00)	Pashayev (yellow card) 45+1'; Hrechyshkin 90+4' (pen.)	Report	Lyednyev (yellow card) 70'; Lunyov (yellow card) 76'; Mykhaylychenko (yellow card) 81' (yellow-red card) 84'; Vernydub (yellow card) 89'	Stadium: CSC Nika Stadium; Attendance: 0 Referee: Yevhen Aranovskyi
Note: Match was played behind closed doors due to quarantine in Ukraine during COVID-19 pandemic.

6 June 2020 25	Zorya Luhansk	1–0	Kolos Kovalivka	Zaporizhia
17:00 EEST (UTC+03:00)	Kabayev 13'; Ivanisenya (yellow card) 28'; Lyednyev (yellow card) 75'; Cvek (yellow card) 83'	Report	Vilhjálmsson (yellow card) 15'; Havrysh (yellow card) 21'; Smyrnyi (yellow card) 45+1'; Kozhushko (yellow card) 50' (yellow-red card) 66'	Stadium: Slavutych-Arena; Attendance: 0 Referee: Anatoliy Abdula
Note: Match was played behind closed doors due to quarantine in Ukraine during COVID-19 pandemic.

13 June 2020 26	Zorya Luhansk	1–3	Dynamo Kyiv	Zaporizhia
17:00 EEST (UTC+03:00)	Yurchenko 54' (pen.); Mykhaylichenko (yellow card) 70'; Cvek (red card) 83'; Abu Hanna (yellow card) 90+3'; Cheberko (yellow card) 90+5'	Report	Kędziora (yellow card) 30'; Buyalskyi 71'; De Pena 75'; Popov (yellow card) 77'; Tsyhankov 90+6'	Stadium: Slavutych-Arena; Attendance: 0 Referee: Mykola Balakin
Note: Match was played behind closed doors due to quarantine in Ukraine during COVID-19 pandemic.

21 June 2020 27	Desna Chernihiv	1–2	Zorya Luhansk	Chernihiv
19:30 EEST (UTC+03:00)	Mostovoy (yellow card) 10'; Imerekov (yellow card) 43'; Hitchenko (yellow card) 53'; Arveladze (yellow card) 66'; Khlyobas (yellow card) 86'; Tamm (yellow card) 90+1'; Favorov 90+8' (pen.)	Report	Kocherhin 6'; Vernydub (yellow card) 24'; Cheberko (yellow card) 32' (yellow-red card) 90+8'; Mykhaylichenko 55'; Lunyov (yellow card) 89'; Hromov (yellow card) 90+3'	Stadium: Chernihiv Stadium; Attendance: 0 Referee: Vitaliy Romanov
Note: Match was played behind closed doors due to quarantine in Ukraine during COVID-19 pandemic.

27 June 2020 28	Shakhtar Donetsk	0–0	Zorya Luhansk	Kharkiv
19:30 EEST (UTC+03:00)	Tetê (yellow card) 58'	Report		Stadium: OSC Metalist; Attendance: 0 Referee: Vitaliy Romanov
Note: Match was played behind closed doors due to quarantine in Ukraine during COVID-19 pandemic.

5 July 2020 29	Zorya Luhansk	2–2	FC Oleksandriya	Zaporizhia
19:30 EEST (UTC+03:00)	Cheberko (yellow card) 16'; Khomchenovskyi 45'; Yurchenko 54' (pen.); Abu Hanna (yellow card) 76'	Report	Bezborodko (yellow card) 14'; Luchkevych 19'; Banada (yellow card) 67'; Tretyakov 76' (pen.); Pankiv (yellow card) 90+4'	Stadium: Slavutych-Arena; Attendance: 0 Referee: Kateryna Monzul
Note: Match was played behind closed doors due to quarantine in Ukraine during COVID-19 pandemic.

11 July 2020 30	Kolos Kovalivka	0–2	Zorya Luhansk	Kyiv
17:00 EEST (UTC+03:00)	Lysenko (yellow card) 44'; Bohdanov (yellow card) 62'; Chornomorets (yellow card) 73'	Report	Kocherhin 9', 45+1'; Lyednyev (yellow card) 54'; Khomchenovskyi (yellow card) 65'	Stadium: Obolon Arena; Attendance: 0 Referee: Maksym Kozyryatskyi
Note: Match was played behind closed doors due to quarantine in Ukraine during COVID-19 pandemic.

16 July 2020 31	Dynamo Kyiv	3–1	Zorya Luhansk	Kyiv
19:00 EEST (UTC+03:00)	Tsyhankov 14', 34'; Sydorchuk 15', (yellow card) 41'; De Pena (yellow card) 59'	Report	Hromov 2'; Cheberko (yellow card) 11'; Vernydub (yellow card) 20'; Yurchenko (yellow card) 60'; Lunyov (yellow card) 87'; Abu Hanna (yellow card) 90+4'	Stadium: NSC Olimpiyskiy; Attendance: 0 Referee: Kateryna Monzul
Note: Match was played behind closed doors due to quarantine in Ukraine during COVID-19 pandemic.

19 July 2020 32	Zorya Luhansk	1–1	Desna Chernihiv	Zaporizhia
19:30 EEST (UTC+03:00)	Mykhaylychenko (yellow card) 10'; Khomchenovskyi 53'; Kocherhin (yellow card) 65'; Shevchenko (yellow card) 90+5'	Report	Budkivskyi (yellow card) 1', (goal) 20'; Arveladze (yellow card) 30'; Ohirya (yellow card) 37'; Tamm (yellow card) 45+1'; Imerekov (yellow card) 63'	Stadium: Slavutych-Arena; Attendance: 0 Referee: Vitaliy Romanov
Note: Match was played behind closed doors due to quarantine in Ukraine during COVID-19 pandemic.

=== Ukrainian Cup ===
30 October 2019 Round of 16 (1/8)	FC Oleksandriya	1–1 (5 – 4 p)	Zorya Luhansk	Oleksandriya
18:00 EET (UTC+02:00)	Kovalets (yellow card) 20'; Ivanisenya 78' (o.g.); Babohlo (yellow card) 88'; Bezborodko (yellow card) 117'	Report	Mykhaylychenko (yellow card) 26'; Lyednyev 29'; Tymchyk (yellow card) 32'; Cheberko (yellow card) 110'	Stadium: CSC Nika Stadium; Attendance: 1,061; Referee: Ihor Paskhal
	Penalties
	Bukhal (penalty scored); Hrechyshkin (penalty scored); Miroshnichenko (penalty missed); Babohlo (penalty scored); Stetskov (penalty scored); Bezborodko (penalty scored)		Vernydub (penalty scored); Lyednyev (penalty scored); Yurchenko (penalty scored); Ivanisenya (penalty scored); Kocherhin (penalty missed); Kabayev (penalty missed)

=== UEFA Europa League ===
25 July 2019 2Q	Budućnost Podgorica (Montenegro)	1–3	(Ukraine) Zorya Luhansk	Podgorica, Montenegro
21:45 EEST (UTC+03:00)	Bakić (yellow card) 23'; Mijić (yellow card) 38'; Mirković (yellow card) 47'; Perović 60', (yellow card) 71'; Boljević (yellow card) 90'	Report	Hromov 15', 19'; Mykhaylychenko (yellow card) 23'; Arveladze 82'	Stadium: Podgorica City Stadium; Attendance: 5,500; Referee: Massimiliano Irrati

1 August 2019 2Q	Zorya Luhansk (Ukraine)	1–0	(Montenegro) Budućnost Podgorica	Zaporizhia
19:00 EEST (UTC+03:00)	Hromov 32'	Report	Đurić (yellow card) 24' (yellow-red card) 33'; Mirković (yellow card) 26'; Božović (red card) 34'; Grbić (yellow card) 34'	Stadium: Slavutych-Arena; Attendance: 6,158; Referee: Neil Doyle

8 August 2019 3Q	CSKA Sofia (Bulgaria)	1–1	(Ukraine) Zorya Luhansk	Sofia, Bulgaria
20:30 EEST (UTC+03:00)	Evandro 13'; Bikel (yellow card) 33'; Malinov (yellow card) 41'; Fabbrini (yellow card) 75'	Report	Yurchenko 45+1' (pen.); Tymchyk (yellow card) 61'; Abu Hanna (yellow card) 74'	Stadium: Balgarska Armia Stadium; Referee: Sandro Schärer

15 August 2019 3Q	Zorya Luhansk (Ukraine)	1–0	(Bulgaria) CSKA Sofia	Zaporizhia
20:00 EEST (UTC+03:00)	Khomchenovskyi (yellow card) 21'; Yurchenko (yellow card) 29'; Budkivskyi (yellow card) 45'; Rusyn (yellow card) 68' (yellow-red card) 90', (goal) 89'; Shevchenko (yellow card) 90+2'	Report	Turitsov (yellow card) 15' (yellow-red card) 22'	Stadium: Slavutych-Arena; Attendance: 7,857; Referee: Amaury Delerue

22 August 2019 Play-off	Espanyol (Spain)	3–1	(Ukraine) Zorya Luhansk	Barcelona, Spain
22:00 EEST (UTC+03:00)	Ferreyra (yellow card) 21', (goal) 58'; Javi López 79'; Vargas 81'	Report	Abu Hanna (yellow card) 24'; Kocherhin 38'; Hromov (yellow card) 45+4'	Stadium: RCDE Stadium; Attendance: 13,686; Referee: Tobias Stieler

29 August 2019 Play-off	Zorya Luhansk (Ukraine)	2–2	(Spain) Espanyol	Zaporizhia
20:00 EEST (UTC+03:00)	Lyednyev 54'; Rusyn 78'	Report	Ferreyra 34'; Vargas 62'	Stadium: Slavutych-Arena; Referee: Radu Petrescu

== Statistics ==
=== Appearances and goals ===
No.	Pos	Nat	Player	Total		Premier League		Cup		EL	
No.	Pos	Nat	Player	Apps	Goals	Apps	Goals	Apps	Goals	Apps	Goals
Goalkeepers
1	GK	(Georgia (country)) GEO	Zauri Makharadze	10	0	8	0	1	0	1	0
23	GK	(Bosnia and Herzegovina) BIH	Nikola Vasilj	4	0	3+1	0	0	0	0	0
30	GK	(Ukraine) UKR	Mykyta Shevchenko	23	0	18	0	0	0	5	0
53	GK	(Ukraine) UKR	Dmytro Matsapura	3	0	3	0	0	0	0	0
Defenders
15	DF	(Ukraine) UKR	Vitaliy Vernydub	28	1	20+3	1	1	0	4	0
18	DF	(Ukraine) UKR	Oleksandr Tymchyk	37	0	27+3	0	1	0	6	0
20	DF	(Germany) GER	Joel Abu Hanna	28	1	18+4	1	0	0	5+1	0
77	DF	(Ukraine) UKR	Ihor Chaykovskyi	4	0	0+3	0	0	0	0+1	0
Midfielders
4	MF	(Croatia) CRO	Lovro Cvek	11	0	6+5	0	0	0	0	0
6	MF	(Ukraine) UKR	Mykyta Kamenyuka	10	0	3+6	0	0	0	0+1	0
7	MF	(Ukraine) UKR	Vladyslav Kocherhin	39	9	32	8	1	0	6	1
10	MF	(Ukraine) UKR	Dmytro Khomchenovskyi	31	3	17+8	3	1	0	5	0
14	MF	(Ukraine) UKR	Bohdan Mykhaylychenko	35	3	29	3	1	0	5	0
17	MF	(Ukraine) UKR	Bohdan Lyednyev	33	13	21+6	11	1	1	3+2	1
21	MF	(Ukraine) UKR	Dmytro Ivanisenya	36	1	26+3	1	1	0	6	0
28	MF	(Ukraine) UKR	Artem Hromov	27	5	15+7	2	1	0	4	3
29	MF	(Ukraine) UKR	Volodymyr Bilotserkovets	1	0	0+1	0	0	0	0	0
80	MF	(Ukraine) UKR	Vladlen Yurchenko	35	8	29	7	0+1	0	3+2	1
97	MF	(Latvia) LVA	Andrejs Cigaņiks	4	0	2+2	0	0	0	0	0
98	MF	(Ukraine) UKR	Yevhen Cheberko	33	0	24+3	0	1	0	4+1	0
Forwards
8	FW	(Ukraine) UKR	Maksym Lunyov	25	0	3+18	0	0	0	3+1	0
9	FW	(Montenegro) MNE	Mihailo Perović	11	1	5+6	1	0	0	0	0
22	FW	(Ukraine) UKR	Vladyslav Kabayev	34	7	26+3	7	0+1	0	1+3	0
Players transferred out during the season
11	FW	(Ukraine) UKR	Pylyp Budkivskyi	16	1	5+6	1	1	0	4	0
25	DF	(Ukraine) UKR	Maksym Bilyi	3	0	1+1	0	0	0	0+1	0
31	FW	(Ukraine) UKR	Nazariy Rusyn	17	6	9+5	4	0	0	1+2	2
99	MF	(Ukraine) UKR	Levan Arveladze	10	1	2+5	0	0	0	0+3	1

Source: Competitions

Last updated: 19 July 2020

=== Goalscorers ===
Rank	No.	Pos	Nat	Name	Premier League	Cup	Europa League	Total
1	17	MF	(Ukraine)	Bohdan Lyednyev	11	1	1	13
2	7	MF	(Ukraine)	Vladyslav Kocherhin	8	0	1	9
3	80	MF	(Ukraine)	Vladlen Yurchenko	7	0	1	8
4	22	FW	(Ukraine)	Vladyslav Kabayev	7	0	0	7
5	31	FW	(Ukraine)	Nazariy Rusyn	4	0	2	6
6	28	MF	(Ukraine)	Artem Hromov	2	0	3	5
7	10	MF	(Ukraine)	Dmytro Khomchenovskyi	3	0	0	3
7	14	MF	(Ukraine)	Bohdan Mykhaylychenko	3	0	0	3
9	9	FW	(Montenegro)	Mihailo Perović	1	0	0	1
9	11	FW	(Ukraine)	Pylyp Budkivskyi	1	0	0	1
9	15	DF	(Ukraine)	Vitaliy Vernydub	1	0	0	1
9	20	DF	(Germany)	Joel Abu Hanna	1	0	0	1
9	21	MF	(Ukraine)	Dmytro Ivanisenya	1	0	0	1
9	99	MF	(Ukraine)	Levan Arveladze	0	0	1	1
				Own goal	0	0	0	0
				Total	50	1	9	60

Last updated: 19 July 2020

=== Clean sheets ===
Rank	No.	Pos	Nat	Name	Premier League	Cup	Europa League	Total
1	30	GK	(Ukraine)	Mykyta Shevchenko	8	0	1	9
2	1	GK	(Georgia (country))	Zauri Makharadze	2	0	1	3
2	23	GK	(Bosnia and Herzegovina)	Nikola Vasilj	3	0	0	3
4	23	GK	(Ukraine)	Dmytro Matsapura	1	0	0	1
				Total	14	0	2	16

Last updated: 19 July 2020

=== Disciplinary record ===
No.	Pos	Nat	Player	Premier League			Cup			Europa League			Total		
No.	Pos	Nat	Player	Booked	(yellow card) (yellow-red card)	Sent off (straight red)	Booked	(yellow card) (yellow-red card)	Sent off (straight red)	Booked	(yellow card) (yellow-red card)	Sent off (straight red)	Booked	(yellow card) (yellow-red card)	Sent off (straight red)
4	MF	(Croatia)	Lovro Cvek	2	0	1	0	0	0	0	0	0	2	0	1
7	MF	(Ukraine)	Vladyslav Kocherhin	4	0	0	0	0	0	0	0	0	4	0	0
8	FW	(Ukraine)	Maksym Lunyov	3	0	1	0	0	0	1	0	0	3	0	1
9	FW	(Montenegro)	Mihailo Perović	1	0	0	0	0	0	1	0	0	1	0	0
10	MF	(Ukraine)	Dmytro Khomchenovskyi	5	0	0	0	0	0	1	0	0	6	0	0
11	FW	(Ukraine)	Pylyp Budkivskyi	1	1	0	0	0	0	1	0	0	2	1	0
14	MF	(Ukraine)	Bohdan Mykhaylychenko	12	1	0	1	0	0	1	0	0	14	1	0
15	DF	(Ukraine)	Vitaliy Vernydub	9	0	0	0	0	0	0	0	0	9	0	0
17	MF	(Ukraine)	Bohdan Lyednyev	9	0	0	0	0	0	0	0	0	9	0	0
18	DF	(Ukraine)	Oleksandr Tymchyk	8	0	0	1	0	0	1	0	0	10	0	0
20	DF	(Germany)	Joel Abu Hanna	10	0	0	0	0	0	2	0	0	12	0	0
21	MF	(Ukraine)	Dmytro Ivanisenya	5	0	0	0	0	0	0	0	0	5	0	0
22	MF	(Ukraine)	Vladyslav Kabayev	3	0	0	0	0	0	0	0	0	3	0	0
28	MF	(Ukraine)	Artem Hromov	1	0	0	0	0	0	1	0	0	2	0	0
30	GK	(Ukraine)	Mykyta Shevchenko	1	0	0	0	0	0	1	0	0	2	0	0
31	FW	(Ukraine)	Nazariy Rusyn	2	0	0	0	0	0	0	1	0	2	1	0
80	MF	(Ukraine)	Vladlen Yurchenko	5	0	0	0	0	0	1	0	0	6	0	0
97	MF	(Latvia)	Andrejs Cigaņiks	2	0	0	0	0	0	0	0	0	2	0	0
98	MF	(Ukraine)	Yevhen Cheberko	9	1	0	1	0	0	0	0	0	10	1	0
99	MF	(Ukraine)	Levan Arveladze	1	0	0	0	0	0	0	0	0	1	0	0
			Total	93	3	2	3	0	0	9	1	0	105	4	2

Last updated: 19 July 2020

=== Attendances ===
	Matches	Attendances	Average	High	Low
Premier League	16	30,449	1,903	6,352	0
Cup	0	0	0	0	0
Europa League	2	14,015	7,007	7,857	6,158
Total	17	44,464	4,455	7,857	0

Last updated: 19 July 2020
