= Vladlen Yurchenko =

Ukrainian footballer

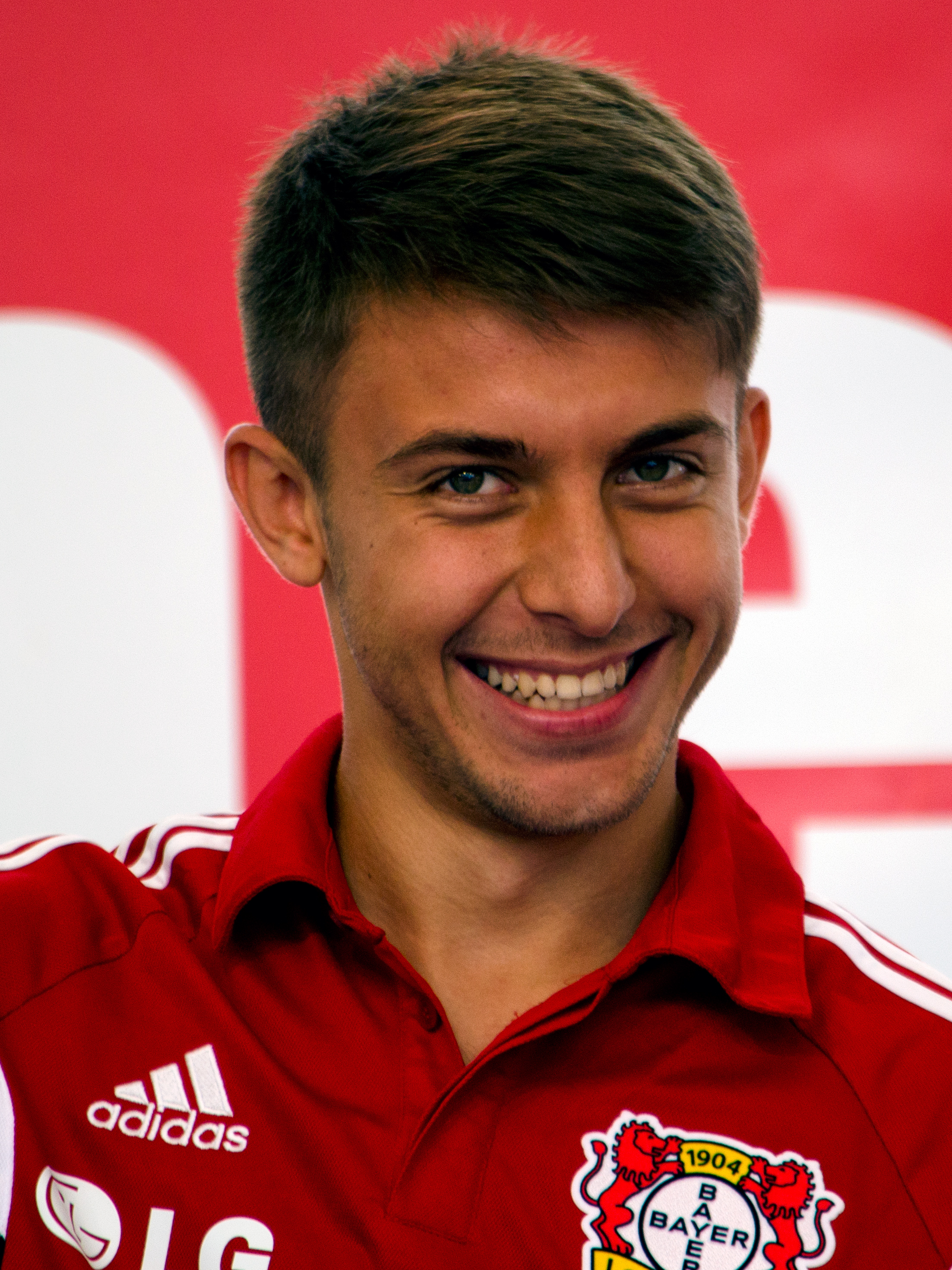
- Yurchenko with Leverkusen in 2014.

Personal information
- Full name: Vladlen Yuriyovych Yurchenko
- Date of birth: 22 January 1994 (age 32)
- Place of birth: Mykolaiv, Ukraine
- Height: 1.83 m (6 ft 0 in)
- Position: Attacking midfielder

Team information
- Current team: Metalist 1925 Kharkiv
- Number: 10

Youth career
- 2005–2007: Mykolaiv
- 2007–2010: Shakhtar Donetsk

Senior career*
Years	Team	Apps	(Gls)
2010–2014	Shakhtar Donetsk	0	(0)
2011	→ Illichivets Mariupol (loan)	3	(0)
2014	→ Shakhtar-3 Donetsk (loan)	1	(0)
2014–2018	Bayer 04 Leverkusen	13	(1)
2018–2019	Vejle BK	16	(3)
2019–2021	Zorya Luhansk	52	(13)
2021	Desna Chernihiv	7	(1)
2022	Riga	13	(1)
2022–2023	Vorskla Poltava	28	(3)
2024– 25	Metalist 1925 Kharkiv	32	(10)
2026-	FC Zorya Luhansk	5	(0)

International career^{‡}
2009–2010	Ukraine U16	12	(7)
2009–2011	Ukraine U17	15	(6)
2012–2013	Ukraine U19	13	(7)
2014–2016	Ukraine U21	23	(3)
- * Club domestic league appearances and goals as of 10 November 2026 ‡ National team caps and goals as of 18 October 2021

Vladlen Yuriyovych Yurchenko (Ukrainian: Владлен Юрійович Юрченко, born 22 January 1994) is a Ukrainian professional footballer who plays for Metalist 1925 Kharkiv.

== Club career ==
=== Bayer 04 Leverkusen ===
On 27 June 2014, Bayer 04 Leverkusen confirmed the signing of Vladlen Yurchenko from FC Shakhtar Donetsk on a two-year deal, with the club holding the option to extend the deal. Yurchenko became Leverkusen's fifth acquisition of the 2014 summer, following in the footsteps of Tin Jedvaj, Dario Krešić, Wendell and Josip Drmić. "With Vladlen Yurchenko we have again signed a big talent, hoping that he will make the next step in his development here," said sporting director Rudi Völler. "This transfer fits our philosophy perfectly, as we like to give young players a chance to prove themselves at a high level."

On 11 May 2018, Bayer 04 Leverkusen announced that Yurchenko would leave the club at the end of 2017–18 season.

=== Vejle Boldklub ===
On 27 September 2018, Vejle Boldklub announced that they signed Yurchenko on a three-year deal. He left the club at the end of the season.

=== Zorya Luhansk ===
On 17 July 2019, Yurchenko signed a two-year contract with Zorya Luhansk in the Ukrainian Premier League. In the 2019–20 season he played 5 matches in the UEFA Europa League, scoring 1 goal. Zorya Luhansk ended up in third position in the 2019–20 Ukrainian Premier League and qualified for the 2020–21 UEFA Europa League, in which he would go on to play 6 matches and score 1 goal. In the 2020–21 season he reached the Ukrainian Cup final, where his team lost 1–0 to Dynamo Kyiv at the Roman Shukhevych Ternopil city stadium.

=== Desna Chernihiv ===
On 30 September 2021, he signed for the Ukrainian Premier League side Desna Chernihiv. On 3 October, he made his debut against his former club, Zorya Luhansk, replacing Levan Arveladze in the 76th minute. On 5 December 2021, he scored his first goal for the club against Mariupol at the Chernihiv Stadium. On 22 December Yurchenko terminated his contract with Desna Chernihiv.

=== Riga ===
On 25 January 2022, he signed for Riga in the Latvian Higher League. On 5 April, he scored his first goal for the side against Spartaks Jūrmala at the Skonto Stadium.

== International career ==
Yurchenko has represented Ukraine at every youth level from under-16 to under-21. Yurchenko was called up to the senior squad for a 2018 FIFA World Cup qualification match against Iceland on 5 September 2016 but did not appear in the match.

== Career statistics ==
=== Club ===
As of 23 November 2022

Club	Season	League			National Cup		Continental		Other		Total	
Club	Season	Division	Apps	Goals	Apps	Goals	Apps	Goals	Apps	Goals	Apps	Goals
Shakhtar Donetsk	2010–11	Ukrainian Premier League	0	0	0	0	0	0	0	0	0	0
Illichivets Mariupol (loan)	2010–11	Ukrainian Premier League	3	0	0	0	0	0	0	0	3	0
Illichivets Mariupol (loan)	2011–12	Ukrainian Premier League	0	0	0	0	0	0	0	0	0	0
Illichivets Mariupol (loan)	Total		3	0	0	0	0	0	0	0	3	0
Shakhtar Donetsk	2011–12	Ukrainian Premier League	0	0	0	0	0	0	0	0	0	0
Shakhtar Donetsk	2012–13	Ukrainian Premier League	0	0	0	0	0	0	0	0	0	0
Shakhtar Donetsk	2013–14	Ukrainian Premier League	0	0	0	0	0	0	0	0	0	0
Shakhtar Donetsk	Total		0	0	0	0	0	0	0	0	0	0
Bayer 04 Leverkusen	2014–15	Bundesliga	3	0	0	0	0	0	0	0	3	0
Bayer 04 Leverkusen	2015–16	Bundesliga	7	1	1	1	3	0	0	0	11	2
Bayer 04 Leverkusen	2016–17	Bundesliga	3	0	0	0	1	1	0	0	4	1
Bayer 04 Leverkusen	2017–18	Bundesliga	0	0	0	0	0	0	0	0	0	0
Bayer 04 Leverkusen	Total		13	1	1	1	4	1	0	0	18	3
Vejle	2018–19	Danish Superliga	16	3	1	0	0	0	2	0	19	3
Vejle	Total		16	3	1	0	0	0	2	0	19	3
Zorya Luhansk	2019–20	Ukrainian Premier League	29	7	1	0	5	1	0	0	35	8
Zorya Luhansk	2020–21	Ukrainian Premier League	23	6	4	1	6	1	0	0	33	8
Zorya Luhansk	Total		52	13	5	1	11	2	0	0	68	16
Desna Chernihiv	2021–22	Ukrainian Premier League	7	1	0	0	0	0	0	0	7	1
Riga	2022	Latvian Higher League	13	1	1	0	2 (Note: two appearance in 2022–23 UEFA Europa Conference League First qualifying round)	0	0	0	16	1
Vorskla Poltava	2022–23	Ukrainian Premier League	11	1	0	0	0	0	0	0	11	1
Career total			115	20	8	2	17	3	2	0	142	25

== Honours ==
Zorya Luhansk

- Ukrainian Cup runner-up: 2020–21

Ukraine U21

- Commonwealth of Independent States Cup: 2014
