= Yevhen Cheberko =

Ukrainian footballer (born 1998)

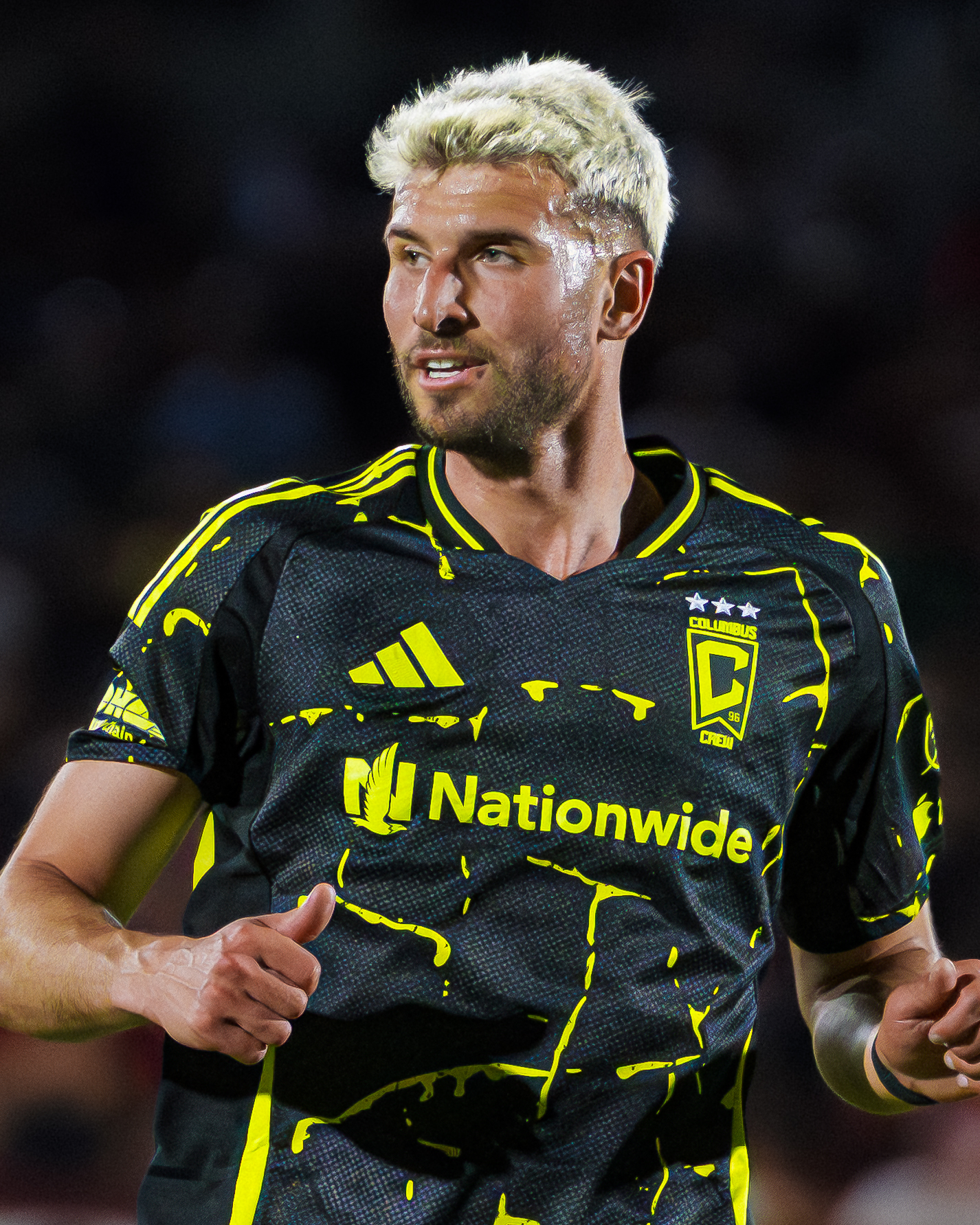
- Cheberko with Columbus Crew in 2026

Personal information
- Full name: Yevhen Ihorovych Cheberko
- Date of birth: 23 January 1998 (age 28)
- Place of birth: Melitopol, Ukraine
- Height: 1.84 m (6 ft 0 in)
- Position: Centre-back

Team information
- Current team: Los Angeles FC
- Number: 23

Youth career
- 2011–2014: UFK Dnipropetrovsk
- 2014–2015: Dnipro Dnipropetrovsk

Senior career*
Years	Team	Apps	(Gls)
2015–2017	Dnipro	14	(2)
2017–2020	Zorya Luhansk	53	(0)
2020–2022	LASK	5	(0)
2021	→ Osijek (loan)	21	(0)
2022–2023	Osijek	31	(0)
2023–2026	Columbus Crew	64	(1)
2026–	Los Angeles FC	0	(0)

International career^{‡}
2013–2014	Ukraine U16	11	(1)
2014–2015	Ukraine U17	12	(2)
2015–2016	Ukraine U18	5	(0)
2016–2017	Ukraine U19	5	(0)
2017–2020	Ukraine U21	15	(0)
2020–	Ukraine	2	(0)
- * Club domestic league appearances and goals as of 17:49, 11 May 2026 (UTC) ‡ National team caps and goals as of 08:34, 25 July 2025 (UTC)

Yevhen Ihorovych Cheberko (Ukrainian: Євген Ігорович Чеберко; born 23 January 1998) is a Ukrainian professional footballer who plays for Major League Soccer club Los Angeles FC. Mainly a centre-back, he can also play as a left back.

== Club career ==
Cheberko with LAFC in 2026

Cheberko is a product of the UFK Dnipro and FC Dnipro youth systems.

On 24 July 2016, Cheberko made his debut for FC Dnipro, coming on as a second half substitute in a match against Volyn Lutsk. On 30 April 2017, he achieved another milestone by scoring his first professional goal against the same team. It came via a penalty kick, securing a 1–0 victory for his club.

Cheberko transferred to Zorya Luhansk on 24 June 2017, following FC Dnipo's relegation from the Ukrainian Premier League. The transfer allowed him to continue competing in the top flight of Ukrainian football, and he agreed to a two-year contract with his new club.

In July 2020, it was announced that Cheberko was transferred to Austrian Bundesliga side LASK for a reported fee of €300,000. Cheberko's stint in Austria did not last long, as he joined Croatian first division side Osijek six months later on an 18-month loan deal with a purchase option. The option was triggered on 2 January 2022, making the loan move permanent. On 4 April 2023, Cheberko was fined and suspended from first-team training by Osijek after refusing to play against Rijeka or travel with the team amid reported interest from an unnamed foreign club. He returned to training on 17 April after apologizing to the club, coaching staff, and teammates.

On 9 June 2023, Cheberko transferred from Osijek to Major League Soccer club Columbus Crew, winning the 2023 MLS Cup final against Los Angeles FC on 9 December. Due to this championship, Cheberko and the club qualified for the 2024 CONCACAF Champions Cup. During the Champions Cup run, Cheberko was a starter throughout the entirety of the tournament, appearing in all seven games as Columbus lost in the final to Pachuca. At the conclusion of the tournament, Cheberko was named to the Champions Cup Best XI. On 19 October 2024, he scored his first goal for the Columbus Crew in the final game of the regular season against the New York Red Bulls.

On 9 June 2026, Cheberko was traded to Los Angeles FC for an international roster slot.

== International career ==
=== Youth ===
Cheberko has represented Ukraine at various international levels. During his time with the under-21 team, he was named as captain.

=== Senior ===
Cheberko made his national team debut on 7 October 2020 in a friendly against France.

On 10 June 2025, after an absence of nearly five years, Cheberko made his return to the national team, earning his second cap in a friendly against New Zealand.

== Style of play ==
A left-footed centre-back, Cheberko came through the youth ranks as a midfielder, before moving to left back, and finally settling in as a centre-back. He has been noted for his technique, composure, and passing ability.

== Career statistics ==
=== Club ===
As of match played 14 July 2026

Appearances and goals by club, season and competition
Club	Season	League			National cup (Note: Includes Ukrainian Cup, Austrian Cup, Croatian Cup, U.S. Open Cup)		Continental		Other		Total	
Club	Season	Division	Apps	Goals	Apps	Goals	Apps	Goals	Apps	Goals	Apps	Goals
Dnipro	2016–17	Ukrainian Premier League	14	2	1	0	—		—		15	2
Zorya Luhansk	2017–18	Ukrainian Premier League	10	0	0	0	—		—		10	0
Zorya Luhansk	2018–19	Ukrainian Premier League	16	0	2	1	0	0	—		18	1
Zorya Luhansk	2019–20	Ukrainian Premier League	27	0	1	0	5 (Note: Appearance(s) in UEFA Europa League)	0	—		33	0
Zorya Luhansk	Total		53	0	3	1	5	0	—		61	1
LASK	2020–21	Austrian Bundesliga	5	0	1	0	1	0	—		7	0
Osijek (loan)	2020–21	Prva HNL	13	0	—		—		—		13	0
Osijek	2021–22	Prva HNL	19	0	3	0	3 (Note: Appearances in UEFA Europa Conference League)	0	—		25	0
Osijek	2022–23	Prva HNL	20	0	3	1	0	0	—		23	1
Osijek	Total		39	0	6	1	3	0	—		48	1
Columbus Crew	2023	Major League Soccer	6	0	—		—		6 (Note: Three appearances in Leagues Cup, three appearances in MLS Cup playoffs)	0	12	0
Columbus Crew	2024	Major League Soccer	25	1	—		7 (Note: Appearances in CONCACAF Champions Cup)	0	7 (Note: Five appearances in Leagues Cup, two appearances in MLS Cup playoffs)	0	39	1
Columbus Crew	2025	Major League Soccer	30	0	—		2	0	4 (Note: Two appearances in Leagues Cup, two appearances in MLS Cup playoffs)	0	36	0
Columbus Crew	2026	Major League Soccer	3	0	3	0	0	0	0	0	6	0
Columbus Crew	Total		64	1	3	0	9	0	17	0	93	1
Los Angeles FC	2026	Major League Soccer	0	0	—		—		0	0	0	0
Career total			188	3	11	2	18	0	17	0	237	5

=== International ===
As of match played 10 June 2025

Appearances and goals by national team and year
National team	Year	Apps	Goals
Ukraine
Ukraine	2020	1	0
Ukraine	2025	1	0
Total		2	0

== Honours ==
Columbus Crew

- MLS Cup: 2023
- Leagues Cup: 2024
- CONCACAF Champions Cup runner-up: 2024

Individual

- CONCACAF Champions Cup Best XI: 2024
