= Maksym Lunyov =

Ukrainian footballer

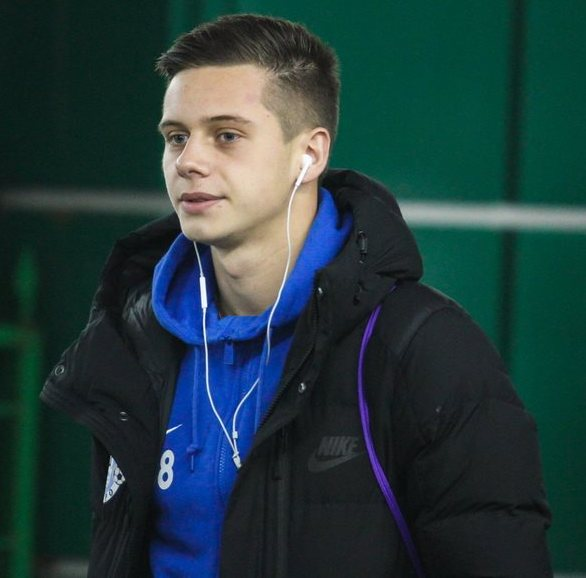

Personal information
- Full name: Maksym Serhiyovych Lunyov
- Date of birth: 22 May 1998 (age 28)
- Place of birth: Nikopol, Ukraine
- Height: 1.83 m (6 ft 0 in)
- Position: Left winger

Youth career
- 2008: Nikopol-98
- 2010–2011: Elektrometalurh-NZF Nikopol
- 2011–2015: Dnipro Dnipropetrovsk

Senior career*
Years	Team	Apps	(Gls)
2015–2017	Dnipro	21	(0)
2017–2022	Zorya Luhansk	90	(3)
2023–2025	Kryvbas Kryvyi Rih	49	(5)
2025–2026	Chornomorets Odesa	4	(0)
2026-	FC Zimbru Chisinau	3	(2)

International career^{‡}
2015	Ukraine U18	4	(1)
2016–2017	Ukraine U19	5	(0)
2017–2020	Ukraine U21	15	(0)
- * Club domestic league appearances and goals as of 20 June 2026 ‡ National team caps and goals as of 19 June 2017

Maksym Serhiyovych Lunyov (Ukrainian: Максим Сергійович Луньов; born 22 May 1998) is a Ukrainian professional footballer who currently plays as a left winger.

== Club career ==
=== Early years ===
Lunyov is a product of Elektrometalurh-NZF Nikopol and Dnipro Dnipropetrovsk youth sportive school systems. His first coach at Dnipro was Ihor Khomenko.

=== Dnipro ===
He made his debut as a substituted player in a second half-time for Dnipro in the match against Volyn Lutsk on 24 July 2016 in the Ukrainian Premier League.

=== Zorya Luhansk ===
In 2017 Lunyov moved to Zorya Luhansk. On 2 January 2023 he left the club with mutual agreement.

=== Kryvbas Kryvyi Rih ===
On 5 January 2023 he moved to Kryvbas Kryvyi Rih.

=== Chornomorets Odesa ===
On 30 October 2025 Lunyov moved to Chornomorets Odesa. On 2 November 2025 in the 14th round match of Ukrainian First League between Chornomorets and Bukovyna Chernivtsi he made his official debut as a player of Chornomorets. Lunyov left the team on June 30, 2026.

== Career statistics ==
As of 2 January 2023

Appearances and goals by club, season and competition
Club	Season	League			Cup		Continental		Other		Total	
Club	Season	Division	Apps	Goals	Apps	Goals	Apps	Goals	Apps	Goals	Apps	Goals
Dnipro	2016–17	Ukrainian Premier League	21	0	3	0	—		—		24	0
Dnipro	Total		21	0	3	0	—		—		24	0
Zorya Luhansk	2017–18	Ukrainian Premier League	25	1	1	1	6 (Note: Appearance(s) in UEFA Europa League)	0	—		32	2
Zorya Luhansk	2018–19	Ukrainian Premier League	13	1	2	0	0	0	—		15	1
Zorya Luhansk	2019–20	Ukrainian Premier League	21	0	0	0	4	0	—		25	0
Zorya Luhansk	2020–21	Ukrainian Premier League	11	0	3	0	5	0	—		19	0
Zorya Luhansk	2021–22	Ukrainian Premier League	10	0	0	0	3 (Note: Appearance(s) in UEFA Europa Conference League)	0	—		13	0
Zorya Luhansk	Total		80	2	6	1	18	0	—		104	3
Career total			101	2	9	1	18	0	—		128	3

== Honours ==
Chornomorets Odesa

- Ukrainian First League runner-up: 2025–26
