= Nikola Vasilj =

Bosnian footballer (born 1995)

- Vasilj with FC St. Pauli in 2025

Personal information
- Date of birth: 2 December 1995 (age 30)
- Place of birth: Mostar, Bosnia and Herzegovina
- Height: 1.93 m (6 ft 4 in)
- Position: Goalkeeper

Team information
- Current team: Al-Diriyah
- Number: 22

Youth career
- HNK Međugorje
- 2010–2013: Zrinjski Mostar

Senior career*
Years	Team	Apps	(Gls)
2013–2017	Zrinjski Mostar	17	(0)
2014–2015	→ Igman Konjic (loan)	24	(0)
2015–2016	→ Branitelj (loan)	13	(0)
2017–2019	1. FC Nürnberg II	42	(0)
2019–2021	Zorya Luhansk	20	(0)
2021–2026	FC St. Pauli	162	(0)
2026–	Al-Diriyah	7	(0)

International career^{‡}
2013–2014	Bosnia and Herzegovina U21	3	(0)
2021–	Bosnia and Herzegovina	30	(0)
- * Club domestic league appearances and goals as of 13 September 2026 ‡ National team caps and goals as of 1 July 2026

Nikola Vasilj (pronounced [nǐkola ʋǎsiʎ]; born 2 December 1995) is a Bosnian and Herzegovian professional footballer who plays as a goalkeeper for Saudi Pro League club Al-Diriyah and the Bosnia and Herzegovina national team.

Vasilj started his professional career at Zrinjski Mostar, who loaned him to Igman Konjic in 2014 and to Branitelj in 2015. In 2017, he joined 1. FC Nürnberg II. Two years later, he moved to Zorya Luhansk. He signed with FC St. Pauli in 2021. Five years later, he joined Al-Diriyah.

A former youth international for Bosnia and Herzegovina, Vasilj made his senior international debut in 2021, earning 30 caps since. He represented the nation at the 2026 FIFA World Cup.

== Club career ==
=== Early career ===
Vasilj started playing football at a local club, before joining the youth academy of his hometown team Zrinjski Mostar in 2010. He made his professional debut against Željezničar on 10 April 2013 at the age of 17. In July 2014, he was sent on a season-long loan to Igman Konjic. In July 2015, he was loaned to Branitelj until the end of the season.

In July 2017, Vasilj signed with German side 1. FC Nürnberg.

In July 2019, he joined Ukrainian outfit Zorya Luhansk.

=== FC St. Pauli ===
In May 2021, Vasilj moved to FC St. Pauli on a three-year deal. He made his official debut for the team on 25 July against Holstein Kiel and kept a clean sheet.

In January 2024, he signed a new long-term contract with the squad.

Vasilj was an important piece in FC St. Pauli's conquest of the 2. Bundesliga title, his first trophy with the club, which was sealed on 19 May and earned them promotion to the Bundesliga.

He played his 100th game for the side against FC Augsburg on 15 September.

=== Later stage of career ===
In July 2026, Vasilj joined Saudi Arabian outfit Al-Diriyah.

== International career ==
Vasilj was a member of the Bosnia and Herzegovina under-21 team under coach Vlado Jagodić.

In March 2021, he received his first senior call up, for 2022 FIFA World Cup qualifiers against Finland and France and a friendly game against Costa Rica. He debuted against Costa Rica on 27 March.

In June 2026, Vasilj was named in Bosnia and Herzegovina's squad for the 2026 FIFA World Cup. He made his tournament debut in the opening group match against Canada on 12 June.

== Personal life ==
Vasilj's father Vladimir was also a goalkeeper and represented Croatia, as is his younger brother Filip.

He married his long-time girlfriend Sara in May 2021.

== Career statistics ==
=== Club ===
As of match played 13 September 2026

Appearances and goals by club, season and competition
Club	Season	League			National cup (Note: Includes Bosnian Cup, Ukrainian Cup, DFB-Pokal, King's Cup)		Continental		Total	
Club	Season	Division	Apps	Goals	Apps	Goals	Apps	Goals	Apps	Goals
Zrinjski Mostar	2012–13	Bosnian Premier League	10	0	0	0	–		10	0
Zrinjski Mostar	2013–14	Bosnian Premier League	2	0	1	0	0	0	3	0
Zrinjski Mostar	2015–16	Bosnian Premier League	4	0	–		–		4	0
Zrinjski Mostar	2016–17	Bosnian Premier League	1	0	4	0	0	0	5	0
Zrinjski Mostar	Total		17	0	5	0	0	0	22	0
Igman Konjic (loan)	2014–15	First League of the FBiH	24	0	1	0	–		25	0
Branitelj (loan)	2015–16	First League of the FBiH	13	0	–		–		13	0
1. FC Nürnberg II	2017–18	Regionalliga Bayern	15	0	–		–		15	0
1. FC Nürnberg II	2018–19	Regionalliga Bayern	27	0	–		–		27	0
1. FC Nürnberg II	Total		42	0	–		–		42	0
Zorya Luhansk	2019–20	Ukrainian Premier League	4	0	0	0	0	0	4	0
Zorya Luhansk	2020–21	Ukrainian Premier League	16	0	3	0	2 (Note: Appearances in UEFA Europa League)	0	21	0
Zorya Luhansk	Total		20	0	3	0	2	0	25	0
FC St. Pauli	2021–22	2. Bundesliga	33	0	0	0	–		33	0
FC St. Pauli	2022–23	2. Bundesliga	28	0	1	0	–		29	0
FC St. Pauli	2023–24	2. Bundesliga	34	0	0	0	–		34	0
FC St. Pauli	2024–25	Bundesliga	33	0	2	0	–		35	0
FC St. Pauli	2025–26	Bundesliga	34	0	2	0	–		36	0
FC St. Pauli	Total		162	0	5	0	–		167	0
Al-Diriyah	2026–27	Saudi Pro League	7	0	1	0	–		8	0
Career total			285	0	15	0	2	0	302	0

=== International ===
As of match played 1 July 2026

Appearances and goals by national team and year
National team	Year	Apps	Goals
Bosnia and Herzegovina
Bosnia and Herzegovina	2021	4	0
Bosnia and Herzegovina	2022	2	0
Bosnia and Herzegovina	2023	2	0
Bosnia and Herzegovina	2024	6	0
Bosnia and Herzegovina	2025	9	0
Bosnia and Herzegovina	2026	7	0
Total		30	0

== Honours ==
Zrinjski Mostar

- Bosnian Premier League: 2013–14, 2015–16

FC St. Pauli

- 2. Bundesliga: 2023–24
