= Volodymyr Bilotserkovets =

Ukrainian footballer (2000–2025)

- Bilotserkovets with Zorya Luhansk in 2025

Personal information
- Full name: Volodymyr Serhiyovych Bilotserkovets
- Date of birth: 22 January 2000
- Place of birth: Hola Prystan, Ukraine
- Date of death: 6 August 2025 (aged 25)
- Place of death: Kherson Oblast, Ukraine
- Height: 1.80 m (5 ft 11 in)
- Position: Midfielder

Youth career
- 2013–2017: Metalist Kharkiv
- 2017–2020: Zorya Luhansk

Senior career*
Years	Team	Apps	(Gls)
2020–2022	Zorya Luhansk	1	(0)
2020–2021	→ Inhulets Petrove (loan)	6	(0)
2021–2022	→ Metalurh Zaporizhzhia (loan)	16	(1)
2022–2023	Metalurh Zaporizhzhia	40	(1)
2024–2025	Inhulets Petrove	25	(3)
2025	Zorya Luhansk	11	(0)
- * Club domestic league appearances and goals

Volodymyr Serhiyovych Bilotserkovets (Ukrainian: Володимир Сергійович Білоцерковець; 22 January 2000 – 6 August 2025) was a Ukrainian professional footballer who played as a midfielder.

== Career ==
Bilotserkovets was a product of the Metalist Kharkiv and Zorya Luhansk Youth Sportive Sportive Systems.

He played for Zorya Luhansk in the Ukrainian Premier League Reserves and in June 2020 Bilotserkovets was promoted to the senior squad team. He made his debut in the Ukrainian Premier League for Zorya Luhansk on 16 July 2020, played as a substituted second-half player in a losing away match against Dynamo Kyiv.

In January 2025, he moved back again to Zorya Luhansk.

== Personal life and death ==
Bilotserkovets was born on 22 January 2000 in Kherson Oblast. He died on 6 August 2025, at the age of 25.
