= Dmytro Matsapura =

Ukrainian footballer

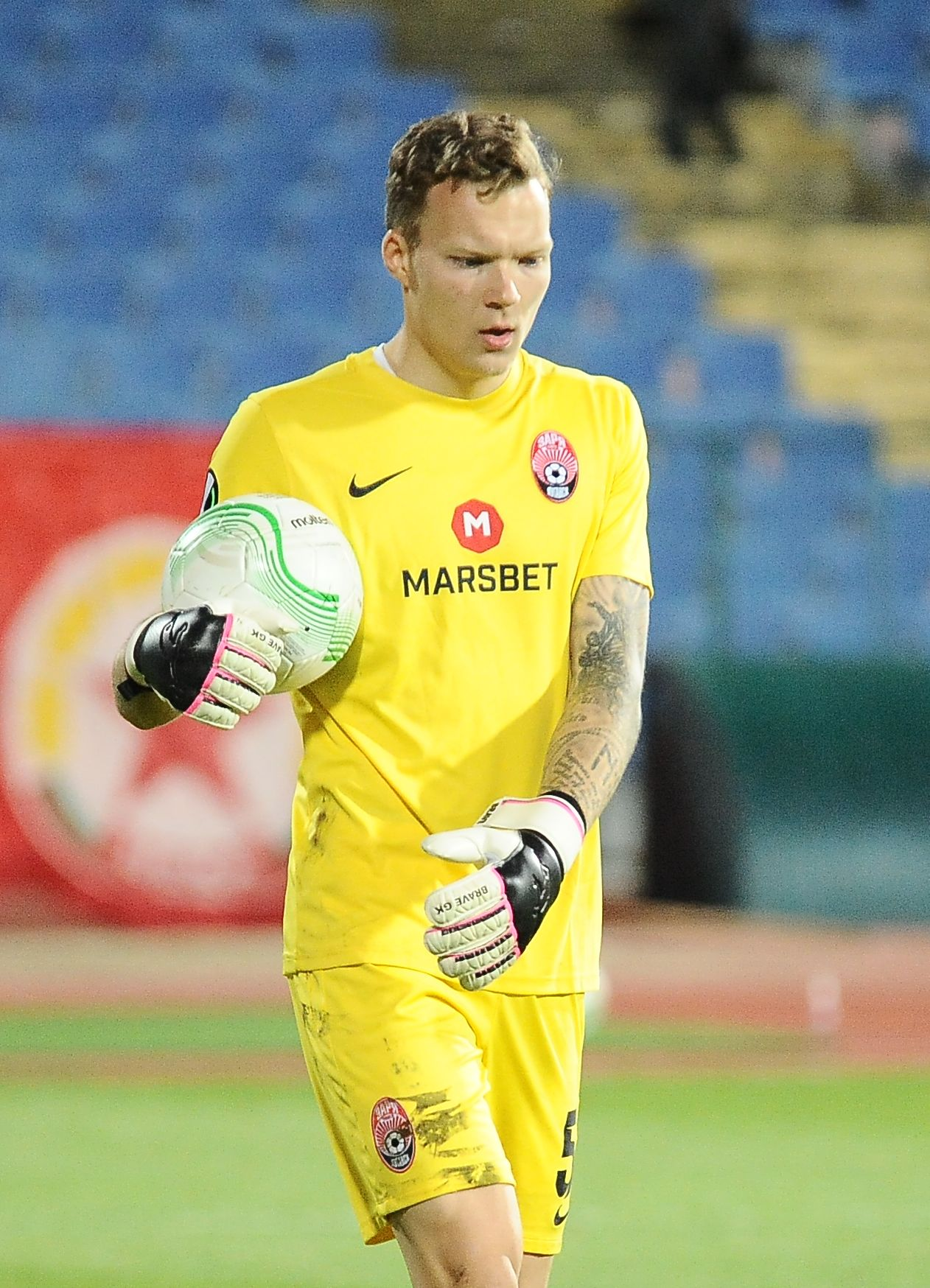

Personal information
- Full name: Dmytro Serhiyovych Matsapura
- Date of birth: 10 March 2000 (age 26)
- Place of birth: Kharkiv, Ukraine
- Height: 1.80 m (5 ft 11 in)
- Position: Goalkeeper

Team information
- Current team: Kolos Kovalivka
- Number: 1

Youth career
- 2013–2017: Metalist Kharkiv
- 2017–2020: Zorya Luhansk

Senior career*
| Years | Team | Apps | (Gls) |
| 2020–2025 | Zorya Luhansk | 36 | (0) |
| 2025– | Kolos Kovalivka | 1 | (0) |
- * Club domestic league appearances and goals as of 3 June 2026

Dmytro Serhiyovych Matsapura (Ukrainian: Дмитро Сергійович Мацапура; born 10 March 2000) is a Ukrainian professional footballer who plays as a goalkeeper for Kolos Kovalivka in the Ukrainian Premier League.

== Career ==
Matsapura is a product of the Metalist Kharkiv and Zorya Luhansk Youth Sportive Sportive Systems. He played for Zorya in the Ukrainian Premier League Reserves and in June 2020 Matsapura was promoted to the senior squad team. He made his debut in the Ukrainian Premier League for Zorya Luhansk on 5 July 2020, played in a match against FC Oleksandriya.
