= Dmytro Ivanisenya =

Ukrainian footballer (born 1994)

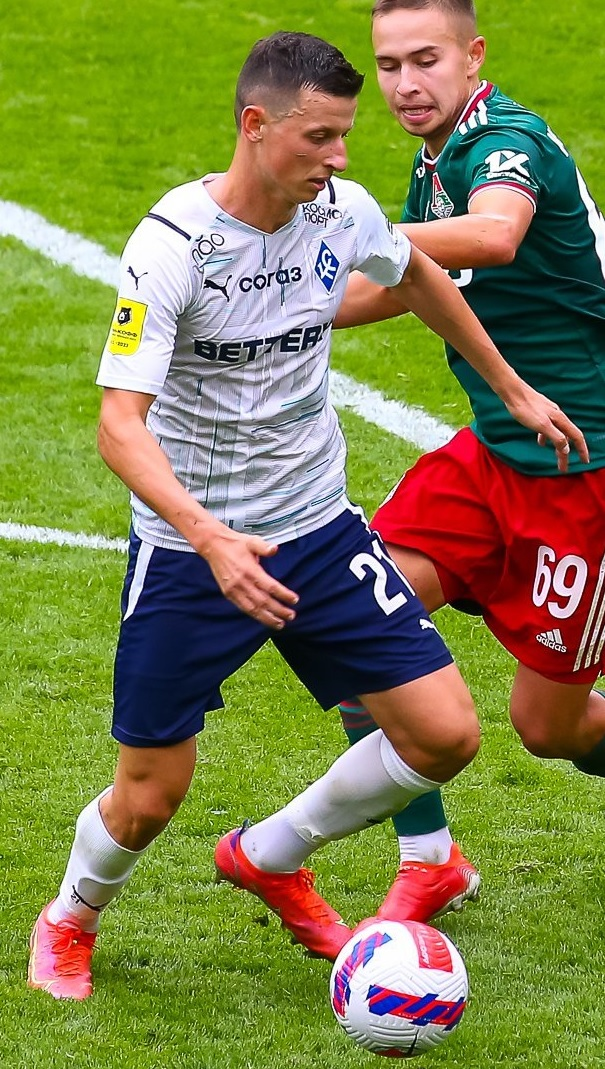
- Ivanisenya with Krylia Sovetov Samara in 2021

Personal information
- Full name: Dmytro Oleksandrovych Ivanisenya
- Date of birth: 11 January 1994 (age 32)
- Place of birth: Kryvyi Rih, Ukraine
- Height: 1.87 m (6 ft 2 in)
- Position: Defensive midfielder

Team information
- Current team: Tekstilshchik Ivanovo (on loan from Krylia Sovetov Samara)
- Number: 21

Youth career
- 2006–2008: Kryvbas Kryvyi Rih
- 2008: Metalurh Zaporizhzhia
- 2008–2009: Kryvbas Kryvyi Rih
- 2010–2011: Shakhtar Donetsk

Senior career*
Years	Team	Apps	(Gls)
2011–2016	Shakhtar Donetsk	0	(0)
2011–2013	→ Shakhtar-3 Donetsk	56	(9)
2015–2016	→ Illichivets Mariupol (loan)	10	(0)
2016–2017	Illichivets Mariupol	6	(0)
2016–2017	→ Illichivets-2 Mariupol	13	(1)
2018–2019	Dinamo Tbilisi	49	(6)
2019–2021	Zorya Luhansk	50	(6)
2021–	Krylia Sovetov Samara	51	(0)
2026	→ Ural Yekaterinburg (loan)	12	(0)
2026–	→ Tekstilshchik Ivanovo (loan)	0	(0)

International career^{‡}
2010	Ukraine U16	7	(0)
2015	Ukraine U21	2	(0)
2019	Ukraine	1	(0)
- * Club domestic league appearances and goals as of 16 May 2026 ‡ National team caps and goals as of 27 October 2021

Dmytro Oleksandrovych Ivanisenya (Ukrainian: Дмитро́ Олекса́ндрович Іванісе́ня; born 11 January 1994) is a Russian and Ukrainian professional footballer who plays as a defensive midfielder for Tekstilshchik Ivanovo on loan from Krylia Sovetov Samara.

After playing in Russia for three seasons, he obtained Russian citizenship in June 2024.

== Club career ==
=== Early years ===
Ivanisenya is a product of the Kryvbas Kryvyi Rih, Metalurh Zaporizhzhia, and Shakhtar Donetsk academies.

=== Illichivets Mariupol ===
In July 2015 he was loaned to the Ukrainian First League club Illichivets Mariupol.

=== Krylia Sovetov Samara ===
On 6 July 2021, he signed a three-year contract with Russian Premier League club Krylia Sovetov Samara.

On 12 February 2026, Ivanisenya was loaned by Ural Yekaterinburg in the Russian First League. On 17 July 2026, he moved on a new loan to Tekstilshchik Ivanovo.

== Career statistics ==
As of match played 23 May 2026

Appearances and goals by club, season and competition
Club	Season	League			Cup		Europe		Other		Total	
Club	Season	Division	Apps	Goals	Apps	Goals	Apps	Goals	Apps	Goals	Apps	Goals
Shakhtar-3 Donetsk	2011–12	Ukrainian Second League	24	1	—		—		—		24	1
Shakhtar-3 Donetsk	2012–13	Ukrainian Second League	32	8	—		—		—		32	8
Shakhtar-3 Donetsk	Total		56	9	0	0	0	0	0	0	56	9
Illichivets Mariupol	2015–16	Ukrainian First League	10	0	1	0	—		—		11	0
Illichivets Mariupol	2016–17	Ukrainian First League	6	0	0	0	—		—		6	0
Illichivets Mariupol	Total		16	0	1	0	0	0	0	0	17	0
Illichivets-2 Mariupol	2016–17	Ukrainian Second League	13	1	—		—		—		13	1
Dinamo Tbilisi	2018	Erovnuli Liga	33	3	4	1	2 (Note: Appearances in the UEFA Europa League)	0	—		39	4
Dinamo Tbilisi	2019	Erovnuli Liga	16	3	1	0	0	0	—		17	3
Dinamo Tbilisi	Total		49	6	5	1	2	0	0	0	56	7
Zorya Luhansk	2019–20	Ukrainian Premier League	29	1	1	0	6	0	—		36	1
Zorya Luhansk	2020–21	Ukrainian Premier League	21	5	4	1	6	1	—		31	7
Zorya Luhansk	Total		50	6	5	1	12	1	0	0	67	8
Krylia Sovetov Samara	2021–22	Russian Premier League	16	0	1	0	—		—		17	0
Krylia Sovetov Samara	2022–23	Russian Premier League	2	0	1	0	—		—		3	0
Krylia Sovetov Samara	2023–24	Russian Premier League	15	0	6	0	—		—		21	0
Krylia Sovetov Samara	2024–25	Russian Premier League	15	0	4	0	—		—		19	0
Krylia Sovetov Samara	2025–26	Russian Premier League	3	0	3	0	—		—		6	0
Krylia Sovetov Samara	Total		51	0	15	0	—		—		66	0
Ural Yekaterinburg (loan)	2025–26	Russian First League	12	0	—		—		2 (Note: Appearances in promotion play-offs)	0	14	0
Career total			247	22	26	2	14	1	2	0	289	25

== Honours ==
Individual

- Ukrainian Premier League player of the Month: 2020–21 (December)
