= Bohdan Lyednyev =

Ukrainian footballer (born 1998)

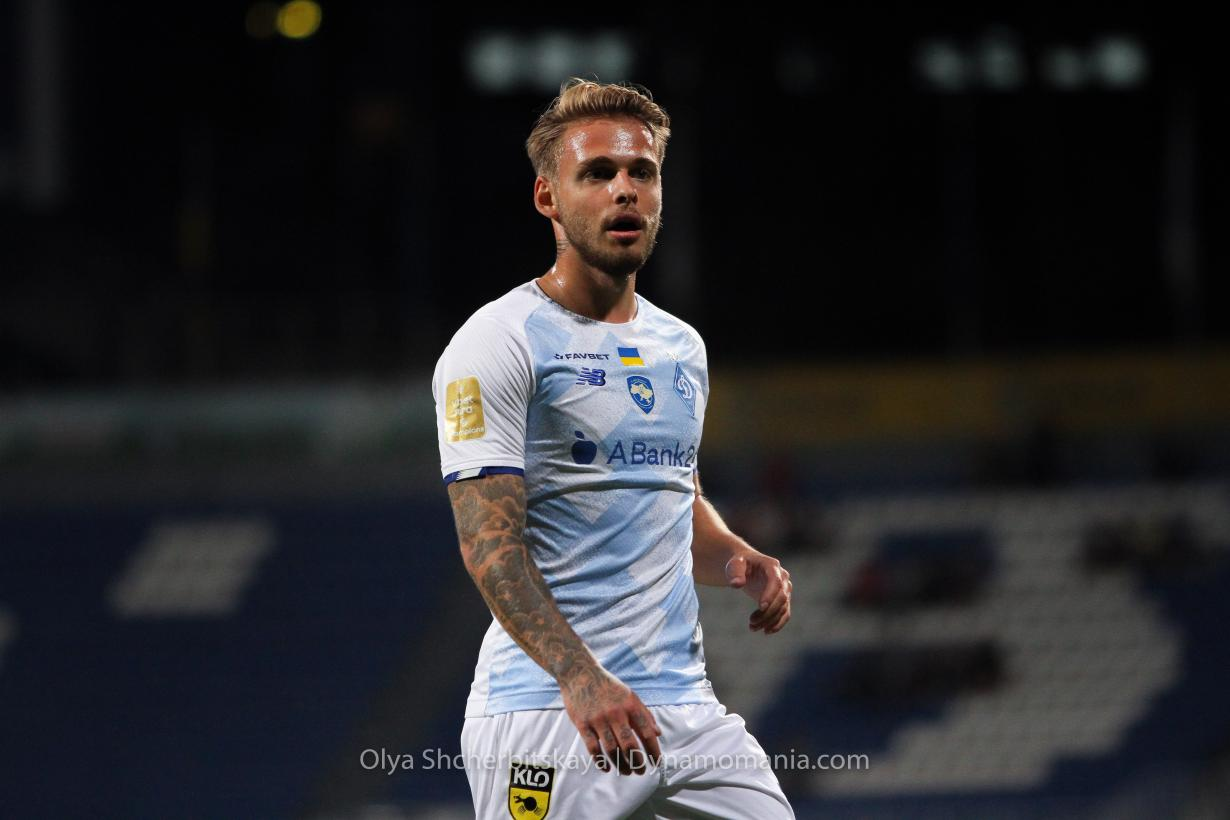

Personal information
- Full name: Bohdan Serhiyovych Lyednyev
- Date of birth: 7 April 1998 (age 28)
- Place of birth: Skvyra, Ukraine
- Height: 1.73 m (5 ft 8 in)
- Position: Midfielder

Team information
- Current team: Polissya Zhytomyr
- Number: 30

Youth career
- 2010–2011: Dynamo Kyiv
- 2011–2013: Atlet Kyiv
- 2013–2015: Dnipro Dnipropetrovsk

Senior career*
Years	Team	Apps	(Gls)
2014–2016	Dnipro Dnipropetrovsk	0	(0)
2016–2023	Dynamo Kyiv	20	(1)
2018–2020	→ Zorya Luhansk (loan)	49	(12)
2022–2023	→ Fehérvár (loan)	16	(0)
2023–2024	Dnipro-1	24	(4)
2024–	Polissya Zhytomyr	28	(1)
2025	→ Polissya-2 Zhytomyr	1	(1)

International career^{‡}
2013–2015	Ukraine U17	5	(0)
2015	Ukraine U19	3	(0)
2017–2020	Ukraine U21	18	(4)
- * Club domestic league appearances and goals as of 3 June 2026 ‡ National team caps and goals as of 30 August 2023

Bohdan Serhiyovych Lyednyev (Ukrainian: Богдан Сергійович Лєднєв; born 7 April 1998) is a Ukrainian professional footballer who plays as a midfielder for Polissya Zhytomyr.

== Career ==
A native of Skvyra, Kyiv Oblast, Lyednyev is a product of the FC Dynamo Kyiv and FC Dnipro academies.

He played in the Ukrainian Youth Football League from 2011 to 2015 for Atlet Kyiv and FC Dnipro. In 2015 he took part in the Dnipropetrovsk Oblast championship for FC Dnipro amateur squad. In 2015 and 2016, he played in the Ukrainian Premier League Reserves for the under-19 and under-21 teams of FC Dnipro and Dynamo Kyiv, respectively.

Lyednyev also played for the Dynamo senior team in the 2017–18 Ukrainian Cup against FC Oleksandriya.

Lyednyev's loan to Hungarian club Fehérvár was terminated on 16 January 2023.

== Career statistics ==
As of 15 May 2022

Appearances and goals by club, season and competition
Club	Season	League			Cup		Continental		Other		Total	
Club	Season	Division	Apps	Goals	Apps	Goals	Apps	Goals	Apps	Goals	Apps	Goals
Dynamo Kyiv	2017–18	Ukrainian Premier League	0	0	1	0	0	0	0	0	1	0
Dynamo Kyiv	2020–21	Ukrainian Premier League	12	1	2	1	6 (Note: Five appearances in UEFA Champions League, one appearance in UEFA Europa League)	0	1 (Note: Appearance(s) in Ukrainian Super Cup)	0	21	2
Dynamo Kyiv	2021–22	Ukrainian Premier League	8	0	1	0	1 (Note: Appearance(s) in UEFA Champions League)	0	0	0	10	0
Dynamo Kyiv	Total		20	1	4	1	7	0	1	0	32	2
Zorya Luhansk (loan)	2018–19	Ukrainian Premier League	22	1	3	2	3 (Note: Appearance(s) in UEFA Europa League)	0	—		28	3
Zorya Luhansk (loan)	2019–20	Ukrainian Premier League	27	11	1	1	5	1	—		33	13
Zorya Luhansk (loan)	Total		49	12	4	3	8	1	—		61	16
Fehérvár (loan)	2021–22	Nemzeti Bajnokság I	8	0	2	0	0	0	—		10	0
Fehérvár (loan)	Total		8	0	2	0	0	0	—		10	0
Career total			77	13	10	4	15	1	1	0	103	18

== Honours ==
Dynamo Kyiv

- Ukrainian Premier League: 2020–21
- Ukrainian Cup: 2020–21

Individual

- Ukrainian Premier League player of the Month: 2019–20 (October)
