= Lovro Cvek =

Croatian footballer (born 1995)

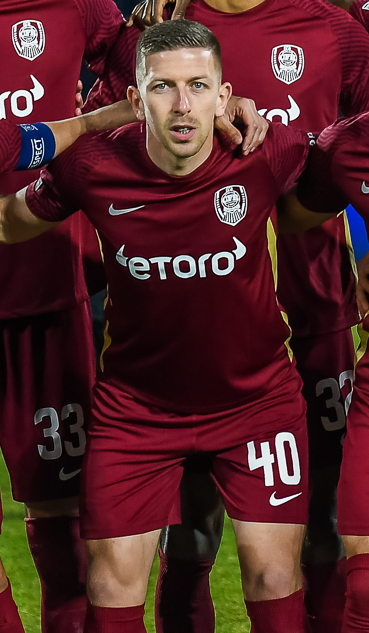
- Cvek with CFR Cluj in 2023

Personal information
- Date of birth: 6 July 1995 (age 31)
- Place of birth: Varaždin, Croatia
- Height: 1.83 m (6 ft 0 in)
- Positions: Defensive midfielder; centre back

Team information
- Current team: Voluntari
- Number: 40

Youth career
- –2014: Varaždin

Senior career*
Years	Team	Apps	(Gls)
2012	Varaždin ŠN	2	(0)
2013–2014	Varaždin	28	(5)
2014–2016	Zavrč	59	(5)
2016	Aluminij	14	(0)
2017–2019	Celje	77	(6)
2019	Senica	13	(0)
2020–2022	Zorya Luhansk	39	(0)
2022	→ CFR Cluj (loan)	3	(0)
2022–2024	CFR Cluj	50	(2)
2024–2025	Ordabasy	16	(0)
2025	Šibenik	16	(0)
2026–	Voluntari	23	(2)

International career
2015	Croatia U20	2	(0)
2015	Croatia U21	1	(0)
- * Club domestic league appearances and goals as of 24 October 2026

Lovro Cvek (born 6 July 1995) is a Croatian professional footballer who plays as a defensive midfielder or a centre back for Liga I club Voluntari.

== Honours ==
Zorya Luhansk

- Ukrainian Cup runner-up : 2020–21

CFR Cluj

- Liga I: 2021–22
- Supercupa României runner-up: 2022

Ordabasy

- Kazakhstan Super Cup runner-up: 2024
