= Dmytro Khomchenovskyi =

Ukrainian footballer (born 1990)

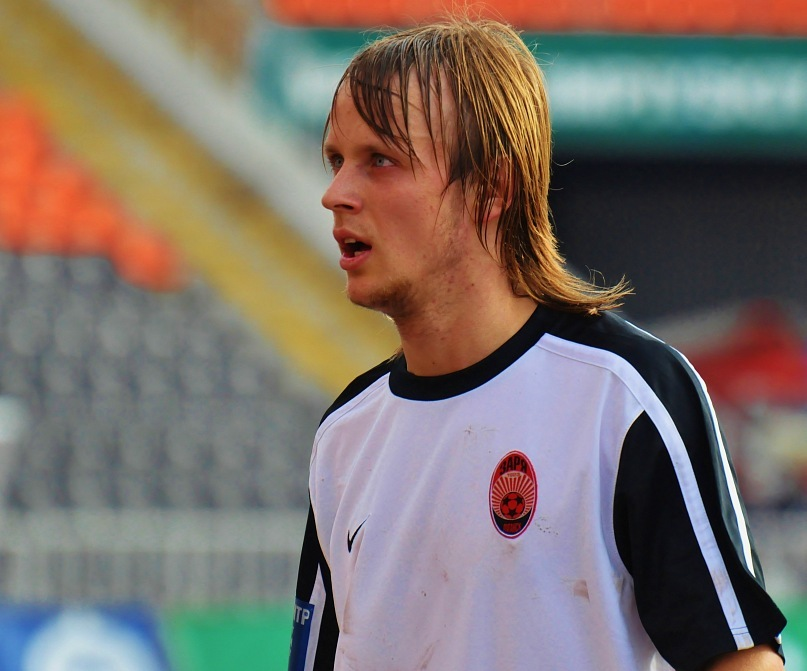
- Khomchenovskyi with Zorya Luhansk in 2012

Personal information
- Full name: Dmytro Hennadiyovych Khomchenovskyi
- Date of birth: 16 April 1990 (age 36)
- Place of birth: Vuhledar, Ukrainian SSR
- Height: 1.82 m (6 ft 0 in)
- Position: Midfielder

Team information
- Current team: Kulykiv-Bilka
- Number: 8

Youth career
- 2003–2007: Olimpik Donetsk

Senior career*
Years	Team	Apps	(Gls)
2007–2011	Olimpik Donetsk	74	(10)
2010	→ Kryvbas Kryvyi Rih (loan)	10	(1)
2011–2015	Zorya Luhansk	102	(15)
2015–2016	Ponferradina	17	(0)
2016–2017	Jagiellonia Białystok	33	(3)
2016–2017	Jagiellonia Białystok II	2	(0)
2018	Ural Yekaterinburg	0	(0)
2018–2022	Zorya Luhansk	82	(7)
2022–2025	Kryvbas Kryvyi Rih	59	(1)
2025-	Kulykiv-Bilka	10	(2)

International career
2010	Ukraine U20	2	(0)
2010–2012	Ukraine U21	11	(1)
2013–2014	Ukraine	4	(0)
- * Club domestic league appearances and goals as of 4 June 2026

Dmytro Hennadiyovych Khomchenovskyi (Ukrainian: Дмитро Геннадійович Хомченовський, born 16 April 1990) is a Ukrainian professional footballer who plays as a midfielder for Kulykiv-Bilka.

== Club career ==
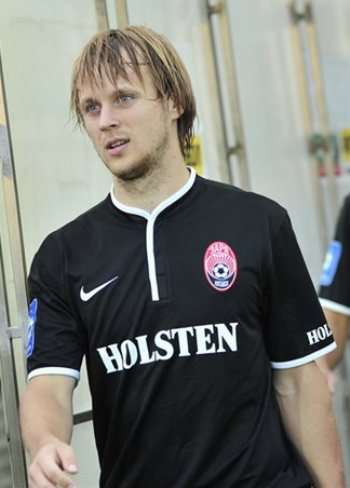
Khomchenovskyi with Zorya Luhansk in 2013

Born in Vuhledar, Donetsk Oblast, Ukrainian SSR, Khomchenovskyi was a FC Olympic-UOR Donetsk youth graduate. After being included in the first team in 2007, he started to appear regularly for the side over the course of three full seasons.

On 1 March 2010, Khomchenovskyi joined Ukrainian Premier League side Kryvbas Kryvyi Rih on loan until December. He made his debut in the competition on 7 August, coming on as a second-half substitute in a 1–1 away draw against Obolon Kyiv.

In March 2011, Khomchenovskyi joined fellow top-tier club Zorya Luhansk. He was an undisputed starter for the side in the following seasons, netting a career-best five goals in 2013–14; in that season, he scored braces against Tavriya Simferopol and Arsenal Kyiv.

On 3 September 2015, Khomchenovskyi rescinded his contract and moved abroad for the first time in his career, joining Spanish Segunda División side Ponferradina. He made his league debut for the club on 13 September, replacing Álvaro Antón in a 1–0 away loss against Alcorcón.

On 22 February 2018, he signed with the Russian Premier League side Ural Yekaterinburg.

On 2 July 2022, he moved to Kryvbas Kryvyi Rih.

On 4 September 2025, he signed for Ukrainian Second League club Kulykiv-Bilka.

== International career ==
After representing Ukraine at under-20 and under-21 levels, Khomchenovskyi made his full team debut on 14 August 2011, coming on as a half-time substitute for Yevhen Konoplyanka in a 2–0 friendly home win against Israel.
