= Joel Abu Hanna =

Israeli footballer

Joël Abu Hanna ג'ואל אבו חנא
Personal information
- Full name: Joël Abu Hanna
- Date of birth: 22 January 1998 (age 28)
- Place of birth: Troisdorf, Germany
- Height: 1.84 m (6 ft 0 in)
- Position: Centre-back

Team information
- Current team: VfL Osnabrück
- Number: 4

Youth career
- –2008: TuRa Hennef
- 2008–2017: Bayer Leverkusen

Senior career*
Years	Team	Apps	(Gls)
2016–2017	Bayer Leverkusen	0	(0)
2017–2018	1. FC Kaiserslautern	11	(0)
2017–2018	1. FC Kaiserslautern II	4	(0)
2018–2019	1. FC Magdeburg	0	(0)
2019	→ Fortuna Köln (loan)	8	(0)
2019–2021	Zorya Luhansk	42	(1)
2021–2023	Legia Warsaw	8	(0)
2022	Legia Warsaw II	1	(0)
2022–2023	→ Lechia Gdańsk (loan)	14	(0)
2023–2024	Maccabi Netanya	24	(0)
2025–2026	Levadiakos	29	(0)
2026–	VfL Osnabrück	3	(0)

International career
2014–2015	Germany U17	16	(0)
2016	Germany U18	2	(0)
2016	Germany U19	2	(0)
2020–2021	Israel	6	(0)
Medal record
Men's football
Representing Germany
UEFA European Under-17 Championship
Runner-up	2015 Bulgaria
- * Club domestic league appearances and goals as of 27 May 2026

Joël Abu Hanna (Arabic: جوئيل أبو حنا, Hebrew: ג'ואל אבו חנא; born 22 January 1998) is a professional footballer who plays as a centre-back for 2. Bundesliga club VfL Osnabrück. Born in Germany, he represented the Israel national team.

== Early life ==
Abu Hanna was born in Troisdorf, Germany, to an Arab-Israeli Christian father and a German Christian mother.

== Club career ==
On 26 May 2026, Abu Hanna returned to Germany and signed with 2. Bundesliga club VfL Osnabrück.

== International career ==
Abu Hanna was a youth international for the Germany's U17, U18, and U19 teams.

Prior to his decision to play for the senior Israel national team, Abu Hanna was also considered to play for the senior Palestine national team.

In his first official match playing for Israel versus Czech Republic in a 2020–21 UEFA Nations League fixture, Abu Hanna scored an own goal.
