= Roman Shukhevych Ternopil city stadium =

Sports venue in Ternopil, Ukraine

Coordinates: 49°33′11″N 25°36′33″E

Roman Shukhevych Ternopil City Stadium
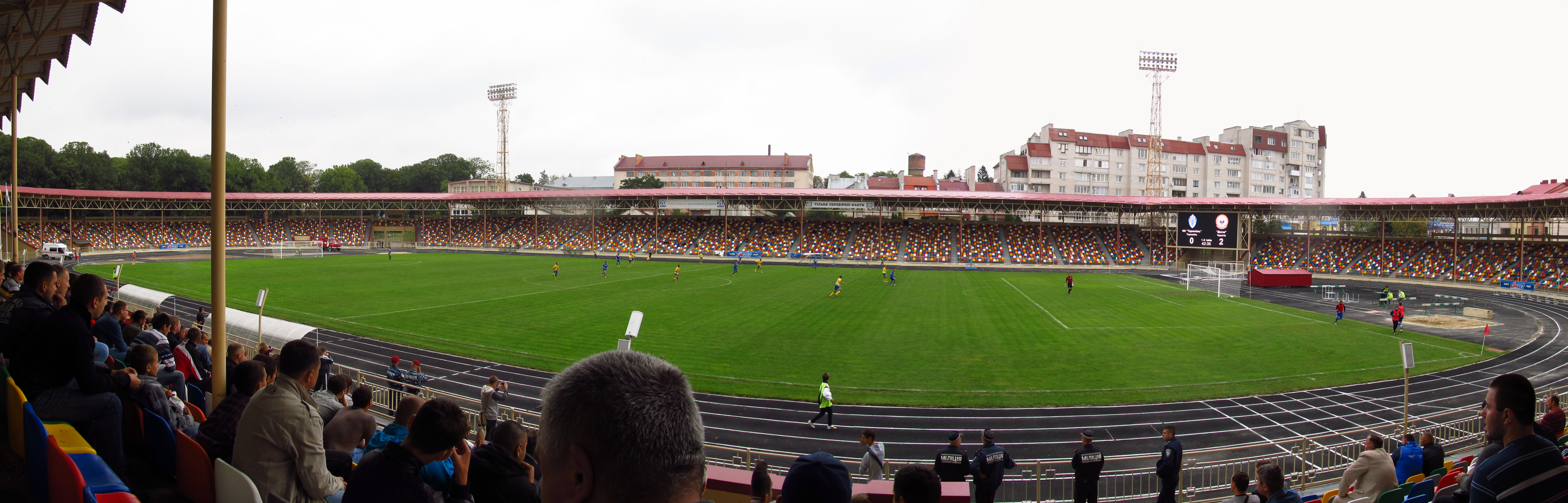
- Interactive map of Roman Shukhevych Ternopil City Stadium
- Former names: Avanhard, Kolo parku
- Location: Ternopil, Ukraine
- Owner: City government
- Operator: FC Nyva Ternopil
- Capacity: 15,150 (football)
- Surface: Grass
- Field size: 106 m × 72 m (348 ft × 236 ft)

Construction
- Opened: 21 August 1909; 117 years ago
- Renovated: 1984, 2011

Tenants
- FC Avanhard Ternopil (1960–1971); FC Nyva Ternopil (1984–present); FC Ternopil (2012–2017)

Roman Shukhevych Ternopil City Stadium (Ukrainian: Тернопільський міський стадіон імені Романа Шухевича) is a multi-use stadium in Ternopil, Ukraine. It is currently used mostly for football matches, and is the home of clubs FC Ternopil and FC Nyva Ternopil.

== History ==
The stadium is mentioned as a sports field "Kolo parku" (Near the park) in 1909 when Tarnopol (today Ternopil) was part of Austria-Hungary. It was a home to local Polish club Kresy and Ukrainian team of Podillya Sports Society.

In Soviet times it was known as Avanhard Stadium and belonged to another football team FC Avanhard Ternopil. In 1983-84, the city adopted a new professional team from neighbouring city of Berezhany and almost completely rebuilt the stadium.

In 2021, the stadium is set to host its first Ukrainian Cup Final and first major competition final in the city overall. The Ukrainian Cup Final at the stadium originally was planned to take place in 2019–20 season on 13 May 2020, but was moved to the next year due to COVID-19 pandemic.

On March 5, 2021, at the session of the Ternopil City Council, the stadium was named after military leader of the Ukrainian Insurgent Army (UPA) Roman Shukhevych. On March 10 the Simon Wiesenthal Centre urged in a letter to Ternopil mayor Serhiy Nadal and the local city council to reconsider this "unfortunate and totally outrageous decision". The Ukrainian Association of Football however has not adopted the new stadium's name and refers to it by its previous name.

The stadium holds 15,150 spectators after the reconstruction in 2011.

The stadium is located on the Bandera memorial street in the "Old Park" in the city of Ternopil. There are plenty of access to the stadium with the public transportation. The entrance fee varies between 15–25 hryven, depending on the luxury conditions. The director of the stadium is Yaroslav Kyrylovych Kolisnyk.

== Gallery ==
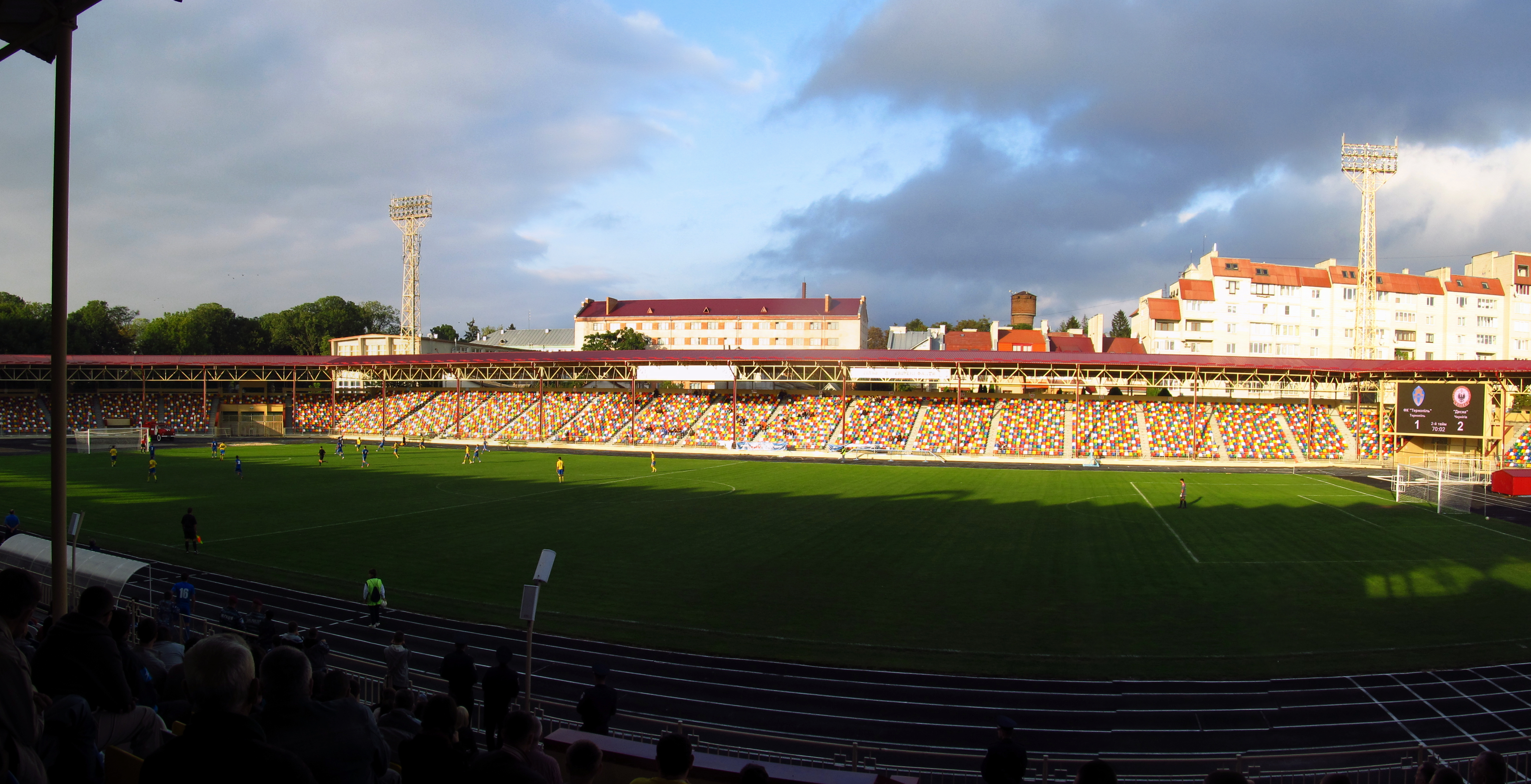
