= 2018–19 FC Zorya Luhansk season =

Zorya Luhansk
2018-19 season
- President: Yevhen Heller
- Manager: Yuriy Vernydub
- Stadium: Slavutych Arena, Zaporizhia
- Ukrainian Premier League: 5th
- Ukrainian Cup: Semi-final
- UEFA Europa League: Play-off round
- Top goalscorer: League: Oleksandr Karavayev (8); All: Oleksandr Karavayev (10)
Home colours	Away colours

The 2018–19 season was 18th season in the top Ukrainian football league for Zorya Luhansk. Zorya competed in Premier League, Ukrainian Cup and UEFA Europa League.

== Players ==
=== Squad information ===
As of 31 May 2019

Squad no.	Name	Nationality	Position	Date of birth (age)
Goalkeepers
1	Oleh Chuvayev	(Ukraine) (Russia)	GK	25 October 1987 (aged 31)
23	Zauri Makharadze	(Georgia (country)) (Ukraine)	GK	24 March 1993 (aged 26)
30	Mykyta Shevchenko	(Ukraine)	GK	26 January 1993 (aged 26)
76	Luiz Felipe ^{List B}	(Brazil)	GK	24 April 1997 (aged 22)
Defenders
3	Dmytro Lytvyn	(Ukraine)	DF	21 November 1996 (aged 22)
15	Vitaliy Vernydub	(Ukraine)	DF	17 October 1987 (aged 31)
18	Oleksandr Tymchyk ^{List B} (on loan from Dynamo Kyiv)	(Ukraine)	DF	20 January 1997 (aged 22)
25	Maksym Bilyi	(Ukraine)	DF	21 June 1990 (aged 28)
29	Tymofiy Sukhar ^{List B}	(Ukraine)	DF	4 February 1999 (aged 20)
44	Vyacheslav Checher	(Ukraine)	DF	15 December 1980 (aged 38)
77	Ihor Chaykovskyi	(Ukraine)	DF	7 October 1991 (aged 27)
Midfielders
6	Mykyta Kamenyuka (Captain)	(Ukraine)	MF	3 June 1985 (aged 33)
7	Vladyslav Kocherhin	(Ukraine)	MF	30 April 1996 (aged 23)
10	Dmytro Khomchenovskyi	(Ukraine)	MF	16 April 1990 (aged 29)
14	Bohdan Mykhaylychenko ^{List B} (on loan from Dynamo Kyiv)	(Ukraine)	MF	21 March 1997 (aged 22)
17	Bohdan Lyednyev ^{List B} (on loan from Dynamo Kyiv)	(Ukraine)	MF	7 April 1998 (aged 21)
20	Oleksandr Karavayev	(Ukraine)	MF	2 June 1992 (aged 26)
22	Vladyslav Kabayev	(Ukraine)	MF	1 September 1995 (aged 23)
28	Artem Hromov	(Ukraine)	MF	14 January 1990 (aged 29)
48	Maksym Kazakov	(Ukraine)	MF	6 February 1996 (aged 23)
64	Serhiy Mayboroda ^{List B}	(Ukraine)	MF	21 November 1997 (aged 21)
76	Yehor Shalfeyev ^{List B}	(Ukraine)	MF	3 October 1998 (aged 20)
91	Mateus Norton	(Brazil)	MF	19 July 1996 (aged 22)
96	Silas	(Brazil)	MF	30 May 1996 (aged 23)
97	Itsuki Urata ^{List B}	(Japan)	MF	29 January 1997 (aged 22)
98	Yevhen Cheberko ^{List B}	(Ukraine)	MF	23 January 1998 (aged 21)
99	Levan Arveladze	(Ukraine) (Georgia (country))	MF	6 April 1993 (aged 26)
Forwards
8	Nemanja Ivanović	(Serbia)	FW	14 May 1997 (aged 22)
11	Pylyp Budkivskyi	(Ukraine)	FW	10 March 1992 (aged 27)
19	Maksym Lunyov ^{List B}	(Ukraine)	FW	22 May 1998 (aged 21)
90	Leonardo Acevedo (on loan from Sporting CP)	(Colombia)	FW	18 April 1996 (aged 23)

== Transfers ==
=== In ===
Date	Pos.	Player	Age	Moving from	Type	Fee	Source
Summer
31 May 2018	GK	(Georgia (country)) Zauri Makharadze	25	(Ukraine) Olimpik Donetsk	Transfer	Free	
19 June 2018	DF	(Ukraine) Vitaliy Vernydub	30	(Azerbaijan) Gabala	Transfer	Free	
19 June 2018	MF	(Ukraine) Dmytro Khomchenovskyi	28	(Russia) Ural Yekaterinburg	Transfer	Undisclosed	
1 July 2018	MF	(Ukraine) Levan Arveladze	25	(Ukraine) Desna Chernihiv	Transfer	Free	
5 July 2018	FW	(Brazil) Rafael Ratão	22	(Brazil) Oeste	Transfer	Free	
19 July 2018	MF	(Ukraine) Maksym Kazakov	22	(Ukraine) Dynamo Kyiv	Transfer	Undisclosed	
31 May 2018	MF	(Ukraine) Mykyta Kamenyuka	32	(Ukraine) Veres Rivne	Loan return		
19 July 2018	MF	(Ukraine) Bohdan Mykhaylychenko	21	(Ukraine) Dynamo Kyiv	Loan		
19 July 2018	MF	(Ukraine) Bohdan Lyednyev	20	(Ukraine) Dynamo Kyiv	Loan		
22 August 2018	FW	(Colombia) Leonardo Acevedo	22	(Portugal) Sporting CP	Loan		
Winter
15 January 2019	DF	(Ukraine) Maksym Bilyi	28	(Ukraine) FC Mariupol	Transfer	Free	
15 January 2019	FW	(Serbia) Nemanja Ivanović	21	(Serbia) Sinđelić Beograd	Transfer	Undisclosed	
18 January 2019	FW	(Ukraine) Pylyp Budkivskyi	26	(Ukraine) Shakhtar Donetsk	Transfer	Free	
22 January 2019	MF	(Ukraine) Ihor Chaykovskyi	27	(Russia) Anzhi Makhachkala	Transfer	Undisclosed	
12 February 2019	GK	(Ukraine) Mykyta Shevchenko	25	(Ukraine) Shakhtar Donetsk	Transfer	Undisclosed	
4 March 2019	MF	(Brazil) Mateus Norton	22	(Brazil) Fluminense	Transfer	Free	
12 March 2019	MF	(Japan) Itsuki Urata	22	(Japan) Giravanz Kitakyushu	Transfer	Undisclosed	

=== Out ===
Date	Pos.	Player	Age	Moving to	Type	Fee	Source
Summer
31 May 2018	MF	(Serbia) Željko Ljubenović	36	Retired	Transfer		
7 June 2018	FW	(Brazil) Iury	22	(United Arab Emirates) Al-Nasr Dubai	Transfer	Undisclosed	
22 June 2018	GK	(Ukraine) Andriy Lunin	19	(Spain) Real Madrid	Transfer	Undisclosed	
18 July 2018	DF	(Ukraine) Yevhen Opanasenko	27	(Turkey) Konyaspor	Transfer	Undisclosed	
25 July 2018	MF	(Ukraine) Ruslan Babenko	25	(Ukraine) Chornomorets Odesa	Transfer	Free	
August 2018	DF	(Morocco) Mohamed El Bouazzati	21	Unattached	Transfer	Free	
3 September 2018	MF	(France) David Faupala	21	(Cyprus) Apollon Limassol	Transfer	Undisclosed	
31 May 2018	MF	(Ukraine) Oleksandr Andriyevskyi	23	(Ukraine) Dynamo Kyiv	Loan return		
Winter
1 January 2019	DF	(Ukraine) Artem Hordiyenko	27	Unattached	Transfer	Free	
1 January 2019	MF	(Ukraine) Ihor Kharatin	23	(Hungary) Ferencváros	Transfer	€0.6m	
15 February 2019	DF	(Ukraine) Oleksandr Svatok	24	(Croatia) Hajduk Split	Transfer	Undisclosed	
16 February 2019	DF	(Ukraine) Vasyl Pryima	27	(Belarus) Shakhtyor Soligorsk	Transfer	Free	
5 March 2019	MF	(Serbia) Anđelo Kačavenda	20	(Ukraine) Tavriya Simferopol	Transfer	Undisclosed	
2 February 2019	FW	(Brazil) Rafael Ratão	23	(Slovakia) Slovan Bratislava	Loan		

== Pre-season and friendlies ==
25 June 2018 Friendly	Zorya Luhansk (Ukraine)	1–1	(Ukraine) FC Mariupol	Zaporizhia
EEST (UTC+03:00)	Hromov 85'	Report	Chobotenko 30'	Stadium: Torpedo Stadium

3 July 2018 Friendly	Zorya Luhansk (Ukraine)	1–0	(Serbia) Partizan	Kidričevo, Slovenia
18:00 EEST (UTC+03:00)	Hordiyenko 89'	Report

6 July 2018 Friendly	Zorya Luhansk (Ukraine)	3–1	(Slovenia) Domžale	Slovenia
18:00 EEST (UTC+03:00)	Karavayev 67'; Shalfeyev 73'; Lunyov 90'	Report	Haljeta 66'

9 July 2018 Friendly	Zorya Luhansk (Ukraine)	3–1	(Serbia) Čukarički	Slovenia
19:00 EEST (UTC+03:00)	Kocherhin 28', 50'; Tymchyk 77'	Report	44' (pen.)

11 July 2018 Friendly	Zorya Luhansk (Ukraine)	Cancelled	(Romania) Astra Giurgiu	Slovenia
EEST (UTC+03:00)		Report

11 July 2018 Friendly	Zorya Luhansk (Ukraine)	1–1	(Croatia) Rudeš	Slovenia
17:30 EEST (UTC+03:00)	Hromov 41'	Report	21'

13 July 2018 Friendly	Zorya Luhansk (Ukraine)	1–3	(Croatia) Hajduk Split	Slovenia
EEST (UTC+03:00)	Hordiyenko 41'	Report	Vučur 49'; Delić 67'; Nejašmić 87'

25 January 2019 Friendly	Zorya Luhansk (Ukraine)	1–0	(Latvia) Liepāja	Turkey
10:00 EET (UTC+02:00)	Budkivskyi 10'	Report

27 January 2019 Friendly	Zorya Luhansk (Ukraine)	Cancelled	(Serbia) Voždovac	Turkey
EET (UTC+02:00)		Report

27 January 2019 Friendly	Zorya Luhansk (Ukraine)	1–2	(Serbia) Vojvodina	Turkey
16:00 EET (UTC+02:00)	Ivanović 83'	Report	Gojkov 80'; Milojević 84'

30 January 2019 Friendly	Zorya Luhansk (Ukraine)	1–0	(Serbia) Proleter Novi Sad	Turkey
15:00 EET (UTC+02:00)	Khomchenovskyi 6'	Report

2 February 2019 Friendly	Zorya Luhansk (Ukraine)	2–2	(Poland) Piast Gliwice	Turkey
15:00 EET (UTC+02:00)	Mayboroda 65', 81'	Report	Papadopulos 75'; Jorge Félix 76'

9 February 2019 Friendly	Zorya Luhansk (Ukraine)	1–0	(Uzbekistan) Lokomotiv Tashkent	Turkey
16:00 EET (UTC+02:00)	Hromov 84' (pen.)	Report

12 February 2019 Friendly	Zorya Luhansk (Ukraine)	0–1	(Sweden) Kalmar	Belek, Turkey
16:00 EET (UTC+02:00)		Report		Stadium: 68'

14 February 2019 Friendly	Zorya Luhansk (Ukraine)	0–1	(Uzbekistan) Sogdiana Jizzakh	Turkey
EET (UTC+02:00)		Report	87'

16 February 2019 Friendly	Zorya Luhansk (Ukraine)	0–0	(Kazakhstan) Shakhter Karagandy	Turkey
15:30 EET (UTC+02:00)		Report

17 February 2019 Friendly	Zorya Luhansk (Ukraine)	3–4	(Poland) Bruk-Bet Termalica Nieciecza	Turkey
10:00 EET (UTC+02:00)	Mykhaylychenko 33'; Tymchyk 53'; Acevedo 83'	Report	23'; 36'; 64'; 73'

19 February 2019 Friendly	Zorya Luhansk (Ukraine)	2–1	(Georgia (country)) Dinamo Tbilisi	Turkey
15:00 EET (UTC+02:00)	Karavayev 50' (pen.); Ivanović 86'	Report	27'

27 March 2019 Friendly	FC Mariupol (Ukraine)	2–2	(Ukraine) Zorya Luhansk	Zaporizhia
15:00 EET (UTC+02:00)	Budkivskyi 52'; Lytvyn 62'	Report	Myshnyov 30'; Fedorchuk 74' (pen.)	Stadium: Torpedo Stadium

28 March 2019 Friendly	Metalurh Zaporizhya (Ukraine)	0–4	(Ukraine) Zorya Luhansk	Zaporizhia
12:00 EET (UTC+02:00)		Report	Kocherhin 4'; Ivanović 20'; Povaliy 54'; Acevedo 60'	Stadium: Torpedo Stadium

== Competitions ==
=== Overall ===
Competition	First match	Last match	Starting round	Final position	Record							
Competition	First match	Last match	Starting round	Final position	Pld	W	D	L	GF	GA	GD	Win %
Premier League	22 July 2018	30 May 2019	Matchday 1	5th	32	11	10	11	39	34	+5	34.38
Cup	31 October 2018	17 April 2019	Round of 16 (1/8)	Semi-final	3	1	1	1	3	3	+0	33.33
Europa League	9 August 2018	30 August	3Q	Play-off	4	0	3	1	5	6	−1	0.00
Total					39	12	14	13	47	43	+4	30.77

Last updated: 31 May 2019
Source: Competitions

=== Premier League ===
==== League table ====
Pos	Team	Pld	W	D	L	GF	GA	GD	Pts	Qualification or relegation
2	Dynamo Kyiv	32	22	6	4	54	18	+36	72	Qualification for the Champions League third qualifying round
3	FC Oleksandriya	32	14	7	11	39	34	+5	49	Qualification for the Europa League group stage (Note: Since the winners of the 2018–19 Ukrainian Cup, Shakhtar Donetsk, qualified for European competition based on league position, the spot awarded to the cup winners (Europa League group stage) was passed to the third-placed team, the spot awarded to the third-placed team (Europa League third qualifying round) was passed to the fourth-placed team, and the spot awarded to the fourth-placed team (Europa League second qualifying round) was passed to the fifth-placed team.)
4	FC Mariupol	32	12	7	13	36	47	−11	43 (Note: Head to Head: Mariupol – Zorya +3=0-1, advantage Mariupol.)	Qualification for the Europa League third qualifying round
5	Zorya Luhansk	32	11	10	11	39	34	+5	43	Qualification for the Europa League second qualifying round
6	FC Lviv	32	8	10	14	25	40	−15	34	

Source: Ukrainian Premier League (in Ukrainian), UEFA, Soccerway
Rules for classification: 1) Points; 2) Head-to-head points; 3) Head-to-head goal difference; 4) Head-to-head higher number of goals scored; 5) Goal difference; 6) Higher number of goals scored; 7) Draw or "golden match" if tied for title (Article 22, paragraph 3).
Notes:

Teams that placed 10th and 11th in the 2018–19 Ukrainian Premier League play two-leg play-off with the second and third teams of the 2018–19 Ukrainian First League. The draw for play-offs took place on 24 May 2019 and the games will be played on 4 and 8 June 2019.

Team 1	Agg.	Team 2	1st leg	2nd leg
Chornomorets Odesa	0 – 2	Kolos Kovalivka	0 – 0	0 – 2
Karpaty Lviv	3 – 1	Volyn Lutsk	0 – 0	3 – 1

=== First leg ===
4 June 2019
19:00 UTC+3

Chornomorets Odesa	0 – 0	Kolos Kovalivka
	Report

Chornomorets Stadium, Odesa
Attendance: 5,435
Referee: Anatoliy Abdula (Kharkiv)

4 June 2019
19:00 UTC+3

Karpaty Lviv	0 – 0	Volyn Lutsk
	Report

Ukraina Stadium, Lviv
Attendance: 10,104
Referee: Denys Shurman (Vyshneve)

=== Second leg ===
8 June 2019
17:00 UTC+3

Kolos Kovalivka	2 – 0	Chornomorets Odesa
Havrysh 57', 63' (pen.)	Report

Kolos Stadium, Kovalivka
Attendance: 2,500
Referee: Vitaliy Romanov

Kolos Kovalivka won 2–0 on aggregate and were promoted to the 2019–20 Ukrainian Premier League. Chornomorets Odesa were relegated to the 2019–20 Ukrainian First League

8 June 2019
19:00 UTC+3

Volyn Lutsk	0 – 3 ~~1 – 3~~	Karpaty Lviv
Kozhanov 42'	Report	Klyots 37'; Ponde 82' (pen.); Miroshnichenko 90+5'

Avanhard Stadium, Lutsk
Attendance: 5,200
Referee: Maksym Kozyryatskyi

Karpaty Lviv won 3–0 on aggregate and retained their spot in the 2019–20 Ukrainian Premier League. Volyn Lutsk remained in the 2019–20 Ukrainian First League

Due to fan violence at the game and attack on referee, the original score 1–3 was scratched and replaced with technical score 0–3 loss to Volyn and win for Karpaty. Additionally, the Lutsk department of police started criminal proceedings on the fact of intentional damage to property during the game by the Karpaty fans.

==== Results summary ====
Overall								Home						Away					
Pld	W	D	L	GF	GA	GD	Pts	W	D	L	GF	GA	GD	W	D	L	GF	GA	GD
32	11	10	11	39	34	+5	43	6	5	5	19	14	+5	5	5	6	20	20	0

Last updated: 31 May 2019.
Source: Competitive matches

==== Results by round ====
Round	1	2	3	4	5	6	7	8	9	10	11	12	13	14	15	16	17	18	19	20	21	22	23	24	25	26	27	28	29	30	31	32
Ground	H	A	H	A	H	H	A	H	A	H	A	A	H	A	H	A	A	H	A	H	A	H	H	A	H	A	H	A	H	A	H	A
Result	W	L	D	W	D	L	W	D	L	D	D	L	D	W	W	D	W	W	L	W	D	L	L	L	W	W	L	D	L	D	W	L
Position	4	7	6	4	5	5	4	4	5	5	5	7	8	6	5	7	4	4	4	4	4	4	5	5	4	4	4	5	5	5	4	5

Updated to match(es) played on 31 May 2019. Source: Competitive matches
A = Away; H = Home; W = Win; D = Draw; L = Loss

==== Matches ====
22 July 2018 1	Zorya Luhansk	2–1	FC Mariupol	Zaporizhia
19:30 EEST (UTC+03:00)	Kamenyuka (yellow card) 8'; Kharatin (yellow card) 38'; Hordiyenko 50'; Karavayev 85'	Report	Churko 9' (pen.); Myshnyov (yellow card) 23'; Tyschenko (yellow card) 45'; Bykov (yellow card) 76'	Stadium: Slavutych-Arena; Attendance: 1,956; Referee: Mykola Balakin

28 July 2018 2	FC Oleksandriya	1–0	Zorya Luhansk	Oleksandriya
17:00 EEST (UTC+03:00)	Banada 85'	Report		Stadium: CSC Nika Stadium; Attendance: 2,110; Referee: Ievgenii Aranovskyi

4 August 2018 3	Zorya Luhansk	1–1	Chornomorets Odesa	Zaporizhia
19:30 EEST (UTC+03:00)	Rafael Ratão 22'; Cheberko (yellow card) 88'	Report	Hrachov (yellow card) 52'; Savchenko 59'	Stadium: Slavutych-Arena; Attendance: 3,961; Referee: Viktor Kopiyevskyi

12 August 2018 4	Karpaty Lviv	0–1	Zorya Luhansk	Lviv
17:00 EEST (UTC+03:00)	Lebedenko (yellow card) 81'; Méndez (yellow card) 90+5'	Report	Svatok (yellow card) 25'; Mykhaylychenko (yellow card) 75'; Kharatin 77'; Khomchenovskyi (yellow card) 90+5'	Stadium: Ukraina Stadium; Attendance: 5,352; Referee: Mykola Kryvonosov

18 August 2018 5	Zorya Luhansk	0–0	Olimpik Donetsk	Zaporizhia
19:30 EEST (UTC+03:00)	Hordiyenko (yellow card) 22'; Kharatin (yellow card) 89'	Report		Stadium: Slavutych-Arena; Attendance: 3,498; Referee: Oleksandr Derdo

26 August 2018 6	Zorya Luhansk	0–2	Desna Chernihiv	Zaporizhia
19:30 EEST (UTC+03:00)	Lyednyev (yellow card) 45'	Report	Starenkyi 11'; Bezborodko 73'	Stadium: Slavutych-Arena; Attendance: 2,228; Referee: Ievgenii Aranovskyi

2 September 2018 7	Arsenal Kyiv	0–5	Zorya Luhansk	Kyiv
19:30 EEST (UTC+03:00)	Orikhovskyi (yellow card) 63'	Report	Karavayev 5'; Khomchenovskyi 13', 68'; Rafael Ratão 43'; Lyednyev 51'	Stadium: Dynamo Stadium; Attendance: 2,211; Referee: Yuriy Mozharovskyi

16 September 2018 8	Zorya Luhansk	1–1	Dynamo Kyiv	Zaporizhia
17:00 EEST (UTC+03:00)	Kabayev (yellow card) 41' (yellow-red card) 90+3'; Hromov 44'; Silas (yellow card) 69'; Kharatin (yellow card) 89'	Report	Buyalskyi (yellow card) 30'; Shepelyev (yellow card) 46'; Sydorchuk 67'; Tsyhankov (yellow card) 90+2'	Stadium: Slavutych-Arena; Attendance: 9,237; Referee: Viktor Kopiyevskyi

23 September 2018 9	Vorskla Poltava	2–1	Zorya Luhansk	Poltava
19:30 EEST (UTC+03:00)	Chesnakov (yellow card) 24'; Dallku (yellow card) 63'; Rebenok 64'; Kulach (yellow card) 68'; Serhiychuk (yellow card) 69'; Pryima 90' (o.g.); Shust (yellow card) 90+2'	Report	Mykhaylychenko (yellow card) 58'; Rafael Ratão (yellow card) 68'; Karavayev 70', (yellow card) 89'	Stadium: Vorskla Stadium; Attendance: 5,800; Referee: Serhiy Boyko

30 September 2018 10	Zorya Luhansk	0–0	FC Lviv	Zaporizhia
17:00 EEST (UTC+03:00)	Rafael Ratão (yellow card) 71'	Report	Jonatan Lima (yellow card) 47'; Lucas Taylor (yellow card) 48'; Marthã (yellow card) 82'	Stadium: Slavutych-Arena; Attendance: 3,197; Referee: Dmytro Kutakov

7 October 2018 11	Shakhtar Donetsk	1–1	Zorya Luhansk	Kharkiv
17:00 EEST (UTC+03:00)	Moraes 38', (yellow card) 44'; Matviyenko (yellow card) 48'	Report	Acevedo (yellow card) 14'; Kharatin 49', (yellow card) 74'; Luiz Felipe (yellow card) 90+1'	Stadium: OSC Metalist; Attendance: 6,015; Referee: Mykola Kryvonosov

20 October 2018 12	FC Mariupol	3–2	Zorya Luhansk	Mariupol
14:00 EEST (UTC+03:00)	Boryachuk 30', 36'; Fedorchuk (yellow card) 34' (yellow-red card) 65'; Vakula (yellow card) 50'; Bykov (yellow card) 60'; Zubkov 83'	Report	Silas (yellow card) 7'; Pryima (yellow card) 26'; Karavayev (red card) 75'; Hromov 90'; Kocherhin 90+2'	Stadium: Volodymyr Boiko Stadium; Attendance: 2,305; Referee: Ievgenii Aranovskyi

27 October 2018 13	Zorya Luhansk	0–0	FC Oleksandriya	Zaporizhia
17:00 EEST (UTC+03:00)	Mayboroda (yellow card) 84'	Report		Stadium: Slavutych-Arena; Attendance: 1,829; Referee: Yuriy Mozharovskyi

4 November 2018 14	Chornomorets Odesa	0–3	Zorya Luhansk	Odesa
19:30 EET (UTC+02:00)	Ostapenko (yellow card) 25'	Report	Tymchyk 27'; Mayboroda 66'; Karavayev 72'	Stadium: Chornomorets Odesa; Attendance: 360; Referee: Yaroslav Kozyk

10 November 2018 15	Zorya Luhansk	2–1	Karpaty Lviv	Zaporizhia
17:00 EET (UTC+02:00)	Khomchenovskyi 16'; Silas (yellow card) 66'; Hordiyenko 71'; Kharatin (yellow card) 90+1'; Tymchyk (yellow card) 90+3'	Report	Shved 34'; Ponde (yellow card) 50'; Miroshnichenko (yellow card) 68'; Carrascal (yellow card) 76'	Stadium: Slavutych-Arena; Attendance: 1,815; Referee: Denys Shurman

25 November 2018 16	Olimpik Donetsk	1–1	Zorya Luhansk	Kyiv
14:00 EET (UTC+02:00)	Balashov 59' (pen.), (yellow card) 90+3'; Do Couto (yellow card) 84'; Dehtyarev (yellow card) 86'; Shynder (yellow card) 89'; Kravchenko (yellow card) 90+3'	Report	Vernydub 50'; Mykhaylychenko (yellow card) 56'	Stadium: Dynamo Stadium; Attendance: 338; Referee: Ivan Bondar

1 December 2018 17	Desna Chernihiv	0–2	Zorya Luhansk	Kyiv
15:00 EET (UTC+02:00)	Starenkyi (yellow card) 29'; Artem Favorov (yellow card) 81'	Report	Silas 23', (yellow card) 87'; Vernydub (yellow card) 54'; Kabayev 80'	Stadium: Obolon Arena; Attendance: 670; Referee: Dmytro Kryvushkin

8 December 2018 18	Zorya Luhansk	3–0	Arsenal Kyiv	Zaporizhia
14:00 EET (UTC+02:00)	Karavayev 36' (pen.); Hromov 51'; Kamenyuka 80'	Report	Zozulya (yellow card) 35'	Stadium: Slavutych-Arena; Attendance: 1,576; Referee: Dmytro Panchyshyn

25 February 2019 19	Dynamo Kyiv	5–0	Zorya Luhansk	Kyiv
18:30 EET (UTC+02:00)	Shaparenko 34', 49', (yellow card) 39'; Verbič 37', 54', (yellow card) 82'; Fran Sol 73'; Sydorchuk (yellow card) 82'; Shabanov (yellow card) 90+3'	Report	Lunyov (yellow card) 31'; Kabayev (yellow card) 78'; Lytvyn (yellow card) 90'	Stadium: NSC Olimpiyskiy; Attendance: 12,764; Referee: Vitaliy Romanov

3 March 2019 20	Zorya Luhansk	3–0	Vorskla Poltava	Zaporizhia
14:00 EET (UTC+02:00)	Hromov (yellow card) 24', (goal) 62'; Silas (yellow card) 29', (goal) 45+1'; Karavayev 77'; Vernydub (yellow card) 88'	Report	Šehić (yellow card) 11'; Artur (yellow card) 26'; Sklyar (yellow card) 54'; Chyzhov (yellow card) 71'; Vasin (yellow card) 87'	Stadium: Slavutych-Arena; Attendance: 2,115; Referee: Mykola Balakin

9 March 2019 21	FC Lviv	0–0	Zorya Luhansk	Lviv
19:30 EET (UTC+02:00)	Pedro Vitor (yellow card) 32'; Paramonov (yellow card) 64' (yellow-red card) 80'	Report	Tymchyk (yellow card) 12'; Mykhaylychenko (yellow card) 28'; Hromov (yellow card) 28'; Vernydub (yellow card) 66'; Arveladze (yellow card) 74'; Lytvyn (yellow card) 76'	Stadium: Ukraina Stadium; Attendance: 949; Referee: Yaroslav Kozyk

16 March 2019 22	Zorya Luhansk	0–1	Shakhtar Donetsk	Zaporizhia
17:00 EET (UTC+02:00)	Cheberko (yellow card) 10'; Lytvyn (yellow card) 60'; Lunyov (yellow card) 77'; Vernydub (yellow card) 86'	Report	Moraes (yellow card) 19', (goal) 25'; Marlos (yellow card) 35'; Taison (yellow card) 70'; Kryvtsov (yellow card) 81'	Stadium: Slavutych-Arena; Attendance: 9,227; Referee: Vitaliy Romanov

3 April 2019 23	Zorya Luhansk	2–3	Dynamo Kyiv	Zaporizhia
18:30 EEST (UTC+03:00)	Karavayev 32'; Silas (yellow card) 43'; Budkivskyi (yellow card) 46'; Bilyi 54', (yellow card) 62', (red card) 69'; Lunyov (yellow card) 56'; Kabayev (yellow card) 60'; Checher (yellow card) 81'	Report	Shaparenko (yellow card) 38'; Kádár (yellow card) 48' (yellow-red card) 53'; Kędziora (yellow card) 56'; Buyalskyi 58', (yellow card) 84'; Tsyhankov 64', 82' (pen.); Verbič (yellow card) 90+1'	Stadium: Slavutych-Arena; Attendance: 7,238; Referee: Viktor Kopiyevskyi

13 April 2019 24	Shakhtar Donetsk	3–0	Zorya Luhansk	Kharkiv
17:00 EEST (UTC+03:00)	Kovalenko 15' (pen.); Kryvtsov (yellow card) 23'; Kayode 50'; Maycon 90+1'	Report	Vernydub (yellow card) 22'; Kazakov (yellow card) 80'; Mykhaylychenko (yellow card) 90'	Stadium: OSC Metalist; Attendance: 6,154; Referee: Anatoliy Abdula

24 April 2019 25	Zorya Luhansk	2–1	FC Lviv	Zaporizhia
17:00 EEST (UTC+03:00)	Cheberko (yellow card) 16'; Budkivskyi 56'; Kocherhin (yellow card) 77'; Karavayev 90' (pen.); Shevchenko (yellow card) 90+4'	Report	Bruno Duarte 42'; Voronin (yellow card) 49'; Marthã (yellow card) 64'	Stadium: Slavutych-Arena; Attendance: 1,562; Referee: Maksym Kozyryatskyi

28 April 2019 26	FC Oleksandriya	0–2	Zorya Luhansk	Oleksandriya
17:00 EEST (UTC+03:00)	Babohlo (yellow card) 39'	Report	Mykhaylychenko (yellow card) 36'; Hromov 41', 62'; Chaykovskyi (yellow card) 50'; Vernydub (yellow card) 82'	Stadium: CSC Nika Stadium; Attendance: 1,900; Referee: Yuriy Ivanov

4 May 2019 27	Zorya Luhansk	0–1	FC Mariupol	Zaporizhia
14:00 EEST (UTC+03:00)	Vernydub (yellow card) 64'	Report	Zubkov (yellow card) 32'; Fomin 34'; Churko (yellow card) 45+1'	Stadium: Slavutych-Arena; Attendance: 1,728; Referee: Oleksandr Derdo

11 May 2019 28	Dynamo Kyiv	1–1	Zorya Luhansk	Kyiv
17:00 EEST (UTC+03:00)	Rusyn 11'; Buyalskyi (yellow card) 54'; Andriyevskyi (yellow card) 80'; Mykolenko (yellow card) 90+3'	Report	Chaykovskyi (yellow card) 42'; Kocherhin (yellow card) 46'; Cheberko (yellow card) 79'; Silas 90+2'	Stadium: NSC Olimpiyskiy; Attendance: 18,257; Referee: Kateryna Monzul

19 May 2019 29	Zorya Luhansk	0–1	Shakhtar Donetsk	Zaporizhia
17:00 EEST (UTC+03:00)	Mykhaylychenko (yellow card) 35'; Tymchyk (yellow card) 83'	Report	Kovalenko (yellow card) 7'; Moraes 11', (yellow card) 29'; Stepanenko (yellow card) 72'	Stadium: Slavutych-Arena; Attendance: 7,123; Referee: Mykola Balakin

22 May 2019 30	FC Lviv	0–0	Zorya Luhansk	Lviv
17:00 EEST (UTC+03:00)	Pernambuco (yellow card) 28'; Cadina (yellow card) 90'	Report	Arveladze (yellow card) 73' (yellow-red card) 87'	Stadium: Ukraina Stadium; Attendance: 896; Referee: Oleksandr Derdo

26 May 2019 31	Zorya Luhansk	3–1	FC Oleksandriya	Zaporizhia
19:30 EEST (UTC+03:00)	Vernydub (yellow card) 22'; Hromov 30', (yellow card) 58'; Lunyov 44'; Khomchenovskyi 68'; Chaykovskyi (yellow card) 74'; Silas (yellow card) 83'	Report	Hrechyshkin (yellow card) 6'; Dovhyi 12'; Luchkevych (yellow card) 20'; Bukhal (yellow card) 49'; Babohlo (yellow card) 58'	Stadium: Slavutych-Arena; Attendance: 1,985; Referee: Dmytro Bondarenko

30 May 2019 32	FC Mariupol	3–1	Zorya Luhansk	Mariupol
17:00 EEST (UTC+03:00)	Zubkov 66'; Vakula 67'; Ihnatenko (yellow card) 90+3'; Boryachuk 90+4'	Report	Pikhalyonok 12' (o.g.); Silas (yellow card) 69'	Stadium: Volodymyr Boiko Stadium; Attendance: 1,712; Referee: Viktor Kopiyevskyi

=== Ukrainian Cup ===
31 October 2018 Round of 16 (1/8)	Desna Chernihiv	1–1 (4 – 5 p)	Zorya Luhansk	Chernihiv
19:30 EET (UTC+02:00)	Bezborodko 37'; Lyulka (yellow card) 47'; Denys Favorov (yellow card) 72'; Yermakov (yellow card) 78'; Starenkyi (yellow card) 105'	Report	Mykhaylychenko (yellow card) 28'; Lytvyn (yellow card) 72'; Kharatin (yellow card) 77'; Lyednyev 84'	Stadium: Chernihiv Stadium; Attendance: 4,063; Referee: Ivan Bondar
	Penalties
	Artem Favorov (penalty scored); Filippov (penalty scored); Kartushov (penalty missed); Khlyobas (penalty scored); Denys Favorov (penalty scored)		Karavayev (penalty scored); Hromov (penalty scored); Acevedo (penalty scored); Lyednyev (penalty scored); Kharatin (penalty scored)

7 April 2018 Quarterfinal	FC Lviv	0–1	Zorya Luhansk	Lviv
14:00 EET (UTC+02:00)	Borzenko (yellow card) 46'; Alvaro (yellow card) 55'; Lipe Veloso (yellow card) 68'	Report	Lunyov (yellow card) 21'; Lyednyev 48'; Cheberko (yellow card) 63'; Budkivskyi (yellow card) 85'	Stadium: Ukraina Stadium; Referee: Yaroslav Kozyk

17 April 2018 Semifinal	Inhulets Petrove	2–1	Zorya Luhansk	Petrove
16:00 EET (UTC+02:00)	Zaporozhets 16'; Schedryi 39'; Pavlov (yellow card) 50'; Sytnykov (yellow card) 88'; Sula (yellow card) 90+6'	Report	Arveladze (yellow card) 30'; Vernydub (yellow card) 33'; Cheberko 45+1'	Stadium: Inhulets Stadium; Attendance: 1,563; Referee: Dmytro Kutakov

=== UEFA Europa League ===
9 August 2018 3Q	Zorya Luhansk (Ukraine)	1–1	(Portugal) Braga	Zaporizhia
20:30 EEST (UTC+03:00)	Lyednyev (yellow card) 27'; Karavayev 27'; Kharatin (yellow card) 27'	Report	Wilson Eduardo (yellow card) 25'; Novais (yellow card) 43'; Horta 69'	Stadium: Slavutych-Arena; Attendance: 5,365; Referee: Tobias Welz

16 August 2018 3Q	Braga (Portugal)	2–2	(Ukraine) Zorya Luhansk	Braga, Portugal
22:30 EEST (UTC+03:00)	Dyego Sousa (yellow card) 8'; Novais (yellow card) 32', (goal) 65'; Horta (yellow card) 50', (goal) 73'; Esgaio (yellow card) 90+4'	Report	Kharatin (yellow card) 34'; Lyednyev (yellow card) 40'; Silas (yellow card) 63'; Vernydub (yellow card) 64'; Rafael Ratão 70'; Karavayev 83', (yellow card) 90+6'; Mykhaylychenko (yellow card) 90+2'; Kabayev (yellow card) 90+2'	Stadium: Estádio Municipal de Braga; Attendance: 12,224; Referee: Aleksandar Stavrev

23 August 2018 Play-off	Zorya Luhansk (Ukraine)	0–0	(Germany) RB Leipzig	Zaporizhia
21:30 EEST (UTC+03:00)	Lyednyev (red card) 17'; Rafael Ratão (yellow card) 29'	Report	Cunha (yellow card) 42'; Saracchi (yellow card) 68'	Stadium: Slavutych-Arena; Referee: Benoît Bastien

30 August 2018 Play-off	RB Leipzig (Germany)	3–2	(Ukraine) Zorya Luhansk	Leipzig, Germany
EEST (UTC+03:00)	Cunha 7'; Augustin 69'; Forsberg 90' (pen.)	Report	Svatok (yellow card) 13'; Rafael Ratão 35'; Kharatin (yellow card) 38'; Hordiyenko 48'; Luiz Felipe (yellow card) 83'	Stadium: Red Bull Arena; Referee: Danny Makkelie

== Statistics ==
=== Appearances and goals ===
No.	Pos	Nat	Player	Total		Premier League		Cup		EL	
No.	Pos	Nat	Player	Apps	Goals	Apps	Goals	Apps	Goals	Apps	Goals
Goalkeepers
23	GK	(Georgia (country)) GEO	Zauri Makharadze	14	0	12	0	1	0	0+1	0
30	GK	(Ukraine) UKR	Mykyta Shevchenko	8	0	8	0	0	0	0	0
73	GK	(Brazil) BRA	Luiz Felipe	18	0	12	0	2	0	4	0
Defenders
3	DF	(Ukraine) UKR	Dmytro Lytvyn	13	0	8+3	0	2	0	0	0
15	DF	(Ukraine) UKR	Vitaliy Vernydub	32	1	26	1	2	0	4	0
18	DF	(Ukraine) UKR	Oleksandr Tymchyk	28	1	20+1	1	3	0	4	0
25	DF	(Ukraine) UKR	Maksym Bilyi	5	1	4	1	0+1	0	0	0
44	DF	(Ukraine) UKR	Vyacheslav Checher	4	0	3+1	0	0	0	0	0
77	DF	(Ukraine) UKR	Ihor Chaykovskyi	9	0	7+2	0	0	0	0	0
Midfielders
6	MF	(Ukraine) UKR	Mykyta Kamenyuka	5	1	4+1	1	0	0	0	0
7	MF	(Ukraine) UKR	Vladyslav Kocherhin	22	1	8+10	1	0	0	0+4	0
10	MF	(Ukraine) UKR	Dmytro Khomchenovskyi	28	4	23+1	4	0+1	0	3	0
14	MF	(Ukraine) UKR	Bohdan Mykhaylychenko	28	0	19+2	0	2+1	0	4	0
17	MF	(Ukraine) UKR	Bohdan Lyednyev	28	3	12+10	1	2+1	2	3	0
20	MF	(Ukraine) UKR	Oleksandr Karavayev	38	10	30+1	8	2+1	0	4	2
22	MF	(Ukraine) UKR	Vladyslav Kabayev	29	1	11+11	1	1+2	0	1+3	0
28	MF	(Ukraine) UKR	Artem Hromov	26	7	15+9	7	1+1	0	0	0
48	MF	(Ukraine) UKR	Maksym Kazakov	4	0	2+1	0	1	0	0	0
64	MF	(Ukraine) UKR	Serhiy Mayboroda	5	1	3+1	1	1	0	0	0
91	MF	(Brazil) BRA	Mateus Norton	1	0	0+1	0	0	0	0	0
96	MF	(Brazil) BRA	Silas	33	3	22+4	3	2+1	0	4	0
98	MF	(Ukraine) UKR	Yevhen Cheberko	19	1	16	0	2	1	0+1	0
99	MF	(Ukraine) UKR	Levan Arveladze	24	0	14+8	0	2	0	0	0
Forwards
8	FW	(Serbia) SRB	Nemanja Ivanović	6	0	1+5	0	0	0	0	0
11	FW	(Ukraine) UKR	Pylyp Budkivskyi	15	1	11+2	1	2	0	0	0
19	FW	(Ukraine) UKR	Maksym Lunyov	15	1	8+5	1	2	0	0	0
90	FW	(Colombia) COL	Leonardo Acevedo	11	0	3+7	0	0+1	0	0	0
Players transferred out during the season
3	DF	(Ukraine) UKR	Oleksandr Svatok	21	0	16	0	1	0	4	0
4	DF	(Ukraine) UKR	Vasyl Pryima	6	0	4+1	0	0	0	0+1	0
5	DF	(Ukraine) UKR	Artem Hordiyenko	14	3	8+2	2	1	0	1+2	1
8	MF	(Ukraine) UKR	Ihor Kharatin	21	2	12+4	2	1	0	4	0
21	FW	(Brazil) BRA	Rafael Ratão	15	4	10+1	2	0	0	4	2

Source: Competitions

Last updated: 31 May 2019

=== Goalscorers ===
Rank	No.	Pos	Nat	Name	Premier League	Cup	EL	Total
1	20	MF	(Ukraine)	Oleksandr Karavayev	8	0	2	10
2	28	MF	(Ukraine)	Artem Hromov	7	0	0	7
3	10	MF	(Ukraine)	Dmytro Khomchenovskyi	4	0	0	4
3	21	FW	(Brazil)	Rafael Ratão	2	0	2	4
5	5	DF	(Ukraine)	Artem Hordiyenko	2	0	1	3
5	17	MF	(Ukraine)	Bohdan Lyednyev	1	2	0	3
5	96	MF	(Brazil)	Silas	3	0	0	3
8	8	MF	(Ukraine)	Ihor Kharatin	2	0	0	2
9	6	MF	(Ukraine)	Mykyta Kamenyuka	1	0	0	1
9	7	MF	(Ukraine)	Vladyslav Kocherhin	1	0	0	1
9	11	FW	(Ukraine)	Pylyp Budkivskyi	1	0	0	1
9	15	DF	(Ukraine)	Vitaliy Vernydub	1	0	0	1
9	18	DF	(Ukraine)	Oleksandr Tymchyk	1	0	0	1
9	19	FW	(Ukraine)	Maksym Lunyov	1	0	0	1
9	22	MF	(Ukraine)	Vladyslav Kabayev	1	0	0	1
9	25	DF	(Ukraine)	Maksym Bilyi	1	0	0	1
9	64	MF	(Ukraine)	Serhiy Mayboroda	1	0	0	1
9	98	MF	(Ukraine)	Yevhen Cheberko	0	1	0	1
				Own goal	1	0	0	1
				Total	37	3	5	45

Last updated: 31 May 2019

=== Clean sheets ===
Rank	No.	Pos	Nat	Name	Premier League	Cup	EL	Total
1	73	GK	(Brazil)	Luiz Felipe	5	1	2	8
1	23	GK	(Georgia (country))	Zauri Makharadze	5	0	0	5
3	30	GK	(Ukraine)	Mykyta Shevchenko	2	0	0	2
				Total	12	1	2	15

Last updated: 31 May 2019

=== Disciplinary record ===
No.	Pos	Nat	Player	Premier League			Cup			EL			Total		
No.	Pos	Nat	Player	Booked	(yellow card) (yellow-red card)	Sent off (straight red)	Booked	(yellow card) (yellow-red card)	Sent off (straight red)	Booked	(yellow card) (yellow-red card)	Sent off (straight red)	Booked	(yellow card) (yellow-red card)	Sent off (straight red)
3	DF	(Ukraine)	Dmytro Lytvyn	3	0	0	1	0	0	0	0	0	4	0	0
3	DF	(Ukraine)	Oleksandr Svatok	1	0	0	0	0	0	1	0	0	2	0	0
4	DF	(Ukraine)	Vasyl Pryima	1	0	0	0	0	0	0	0	0	1	0	0
5	DF	(Ukraine)	Artem Hordiyenko	1	0	0	0	0	0	0	0	0	1	0	0
6	MF	(Ukraine)	Mykyta Kamenyuka	1	0	0	0	0	0	0	0	0	1	0	0
7	MF	(Ukraine)	Vladyslav Kocherhin	2	0	0	0	0	0	0	0	0	2	0	0
8	MF	(Ukraine)	Ihor Kharatin	5	0	0	1	0	0	3	0	0	9	0	0
10	MF	(Ukraine)	Dmytro Khomchenovskyi	1	0	0	0	0	0	0	0	0	1	0	0
14	MF	(Ukraine)	Bohdan Mykhaylychenko	7	0	0	1	0	0	1	0	0	9	0	0
15	DF	(Ukraine)	Vitaliy Vernydub	8	0	0	1	0	0	1	0	0	10	0	0
11	FW	(Ukraine)	Pylyp Budkivskyi	1	0	0	1	0	0	0	0	0	2	0	0
17	MF	(Ukraine)	Bohdan Lyednyev	1	0	0	0	0	0	2	0	1	3	0	1
18	DF	(Ukraine)	Oleksandr Tymchyk	3	0	0	0	0	0	0	0	0	3	0	0
19	FW	(Ukraine)	Maksym Lunyov	3	0	0	1	0	0	0	0	0	4	0	0
20	MF	(Ukraine)	Oleksandr Karavayev	1	0	1	0	0	0	1	0	0	2	0	1
21	FW	(Brazil)	Rafael Ratão	2	0	0	0	0	0	1	0	0	3	0	0
22	MF	(Ukraine)	Vladyslav Kabayev	2	1	0	0	0	0	1	0	0	3	1	0
25	DF	(Ukraine)	Maksym Bilyi	1	0	1	0	0	0	0	0	0	1	0	1
28	MF	(Ukraine)	Artem Hromov	3	0	0	0	0	0	0	0	0	3	0	0
30	GK	(Ukraine)	Mykyta Shevchenko	1	0	0	0	0	0	0	0	0	1	0	0
44	DF	(Ukraine)	Vyacheslav Checher	1	0	0	0	0	0	0	0	0	1	0	0
48	MF	(Ukraine)	Maksym Kazakov	1	0	0	0	0	0	0	0	0	1	0	0
64	MF	(Ukraine)	Serhiy Mayboroda	1	0	0	0	0	0	0	0	0	1	0	0
73	GK	(Brazil)	Luiz Felipe	1	0	0	0	0	0	1	0	0	2	0	0
77	DF	(Ukraine)	Ihor Chaykovskyi	3	0	0	0	0	0	0	0	0	3	0	0
90	FW	(Colombia)	Leonardo Acevedo	1	0	0	0	0	0	0	0	0	1	0	0
96	MF	(Brazil)	Silas	8	0	0	0	0	0	1	0	0	9	0	0
98	MF	(Ukraine)	Yevhen Cheberko	4	0	0	1	0	0	0	0	0	5	0	0
99	MF	(Ukraine)	Levan Arveladze	1	1	0	1	0	0	0	0	0	2	1	0
			Total	69	2	2	8	0	0	13	0	1	90	2	3

Last updated: 31 May 2019
