= 2017–18 FC Zorya Luhansk season =

Zorya Luhansk
2017-18 season
- President: Yevhen Heller
- Manager: Yuriy Vernydub
- Stadium: Slavutych Arena, Zaporizhzhia; Arena Lviv, Lviv (Europa League)
- Ukrainian Premier League: 4th
- Ukrainian Cup: Round of 16(1/8)
- UEFA Europa League: Group stage
- Top goalscorer: League: Iury (11); All: Iury (11)
Home colours	Away colours

The 2017–18 season was 17th season in the top Ukrainian football league for Zorya Luhansk. Zorya competed in Premier League, Ukrainian Cup and UEFA Europa League.

== Players ==
=== Squad information ===
As of 31 May 2018

Squad no.	Name	Nationality	Position	Date of birth (age)
Goalkeepers
1	Andriy Lunin	(Ukraine)	GK	11 February 1999 (aged 19)
76	Luiz Felipe	(Brazil)	GK	24 April 1997 (aged 21)
77	Oleh Chuvayev	(Ukraine) (Russia)	GK	25 October 1987 (aged 30)
Defenders
3	Oleksandr Svatok	(Ukraine)	DF	27 September 1994 (aged 23)
4	Vasyl Pryima	(Ukraine)	DF	10 June 1991 (aged 26)
5	Artem Hordiyenko	(Ukraine)	DF	4 March 1991 (aged 27)
9	Dmytro Lytvyn	(Ukraine)	DF	21 November 1996 (aged 21)
16	Mohamed El Bouazzati	(Morocco) (Germany)	DF	9 January 1997 (aged 21)
24	Oleksandr Tymchyk (on loan from Dynamo Kyiv)	(Ukraine)	DF	20 January 1997 (aged 21)
29	Tymofiy Sukhar ^{List B}	(Ukraine)	DF	4 February 1999 (aged 19)
39	Yevhen Opanasenko	(Ukraine)	DF	25 August 1990 (aged 27)
44	Vyacheslav Checher	(Ukraine)	DF	15 December 1980 (aged 37)
Midfielders
7	Vladyslav Kocherhin	(Ukraine)	MF	30 April 1996 (aged 22)
8	Ihor Kharatin	(Ukraine)	MF	2 February 1995 (aged 23)
18	Oleksandr Andriyevskyi (on loan from Dynamo Kyiv)	(Ukraine)	MF	25 June 1994 (aged 23)
20	Oleksandr Karavayev (Captain)	(Ukraine)	MF	2 June 1992 (aged 25)
22	Željko Ljubenović	(Serbia)	MF	9 July 1981 (aged 36)
27	Vladyslav Kabayev	(Ukraine)	MF	1 September 1995 (aged 22)
28	Artem Hromov	(Ukraine)	MF	14 January 1990 (aged 28)
32	Anđelo Kačavenda ^{List B}	(Serbia)	MF	22 January 1999 (aged 19)
36	Ruslan Babenko	(Ukraine)	MF	8 July 1992 (aged 25)
64	Serhiy Mayboroda ^{List B}	(Ukraine)	MF	21 November 1997 (aged 20)
76	Yehor Shalfeyev ^{List B}	(Ukraine)	MF	3 October 1998 (aged 19)
89	Yevhen Cheberko	(Ukraine)	MF	23 January 1998 (aged 20)
96	Silas	(Brazil)	MF	30 May 1996 (aged 22)
Forwards
11	David Faupala	(France)	FW	11 February 1997 (aged 21)
19	Maksym Lunyov	(Ukraine)	FW	22 May 1998 (aged 20)
49	Dmytro Lukanov	(Ukraine)	FW	2 March 1995 (aged 23)
95	Iury	(Brazil)	FW	6 September 1995 (aged 22)

== Transfers ==
=== In ===
Date	Pos.	Player	Age	Moving from	Type	Fee	Source
Summer
1 June 2017	MF	(Ukraine) Vladyslav Kabayev	21	(Ukraine) Chornomorets Odesa	Transfer	Undisclosed	
1 June 2017	MF	(Brazil) Leonidas	21	(Brazil) Villa Nova	Transfer	Undisclosed	
1 June 2017	MF	(Brazil) Silas	20	(Brazil) Internacional	Transfer	Undisclosed	
19 June 2017	FW	(Ukraine) Maksym Lunyov	19	(Ukraine) Dnipro	Transfer	Undisclosed	
24 June 2017	GK	(Ukraine) Andriy Lunin	18	(Ukraine) Dnipro	Transfer	Undisclosed	
24 June 2017	DF	(Ukraine) Oleksandr Svatok	22	(Ukraine) Dnipro	Transfer	Undisclosed	
24 June 2017	MF	(Ukraine) Yevhen Cheberko	19	(Ukraine) Dnipro	Transfer	Undisclosed	
24 June 2017	MF	(Ukraine) Vladyslav Kocherhin	21	(Ukraine) Dnipro	Transfer	Undisclosed	
6 July 2017	DF	(Ukraine) Vasyl Pryima	26	(Italy) Frosinone	Transfer	Free	
20 July 2017	DF	(Brazil) Iury	21	(Brazil) Avaí	Transfer	Undisclosed	
16 August 2017	MF	(Ukraine) Artem Hromov	27	(Russia) Krylia Sovetov Samara	Transfer	Free	
24 August 2017	MF	(Ukraine) Oleksandr Karavayev	25	(Ukraine) Shakhtar Donetsk	Transfer	Undisclosed	
16 August 2017	MF	(Ukraine) Oleksandr Andriyevskyi	23	(Ukraine) Dynamo Kyiv	Loan		
Winter
1 January 2018	MF	(Cameroon) Gaël Ondoua	22	Unattached	Transfer	Free	
12 January 2018	DF	(Ukraine) Dmytro Lytvyn	21	(Portugal) Real S.C.	Transfer	Undisclosed	
30 January 2018	DF	(Morocco) Mohamed El Bouazzati	21	Unattached	Transfer	Free	
5 February 2018	GK	(Brazil) Luiz Felipe	20	(Brazil) Internacional	Transfer	Free	
6 February 2018	FW	(France) David Faupala	20	Unattached	Transfer	Free	
16 February 2018	DF	(Ukraine) Tymofiy Sukhar	19	(Ukraine) SC Dnipro-1	Transfer	Free	
1 January 2018	DF	(Ukraine) Oleksandr Tymchyk	20	(Ukraine) Dynamo Kyiv	Loan		

=== Out ===
Date	Pos.	Player	Age	Moving to	Type	Fee	Source
Summer
31 May 2017	DF	(Ukraine) Hryhoriy Yarmash	32	Retired	Transfer		
19 June 2017	DF	(Ukraine) Ihor Chaykovskyi	25	(Russia) Anzhi Makhachkala	Transfer	Free	
29 June 2017	MF	(Georgia (country)) Jaba Lipartia	29	(Russia) Anzhi Makhachkala	Transfer	Free	
25 June 2017	MF	(Armenia) Gegham Kadymyan	24	(Ukraine) Vorskla Poltava	Transfer	Undisclosed	
1 July 2017	FW	(Nigeria) Emmanuel Bonaventure Dennis	19	(Belgium) Club Brugge	Transfer	Undisclosed	
2 August 2017	FW	(Ukraine) Denys Belousov	20	(Ukraine) Avanhard Kramatorsk	Transfer	Undisclosed	
20 August 2017	GK	(Ukraine) Ihor Levchenko	26	(Ukraine) FC Mariupol	Transfer	Free	
30 August 2017	DF	(Brazil) Rafael Forster	27	(Bulgaria) Ludogorets Razgrad	Transfer	Undisclosed	
30 June 2017	FW	(Ukraine) Vladyslav Kulach	24	(Ukraine) Shakhtar Donetsk	Loan return		
30 June 2017	DF	(Ukraine) Eduard Sobol	22	(Ukraine) Shakhtar Donetsk	Loan return		
30 June 2017	MF	(Ukraine) Ivan Petryak	23	(Ukraine) Shakhtar Donetsk	Loan return		
7 August 2017	FW	(Ukraine) Denys Bezborodko	23	(Ukraine) Shakhtar Donetsk	Loan return		
20 July 2017	DF	(Ukraine) Mykhaylo Shershen	22	(Ukraine) Avanhard Kramatorsk	Loan		
Winter
4 January 2018	DF	(Ukraine) Artem Sukhotskyi	25	(Slovakia) Slovan Bratislava	Transfer	Free	
26 January 2018	FW	(Brazil) Paulinho	24	(Bulgaria) Levski Sofia	Transfer	Free	
16 February 2018	MF	(Brazil) Leônidas	22	(Ukraine) Olimpik Donetsk	Transfer	Undisclosed	
22 February 2018	GK	(Ukraine) Oleksiy Shevchenko	25	(Ukraine) Karpaty Lviv	Transfer	Free	
12 March 2018	MF	(Cameroon) Gaël Ondoua	22	Unattached	Transfer	Free	
1 January 2018	DF	(Ukraine) Andriy Pylyavskyi	29	(Russia) Rubin Kazan	Loan return		
1 January 2018	MF	(Ukraine) Dmytro Hrechyshkin	26	(Ukraine) Shakhtar Donetsk	Loan return		
1 January 2018	MF	(Ukraine) Vladyslav Kalitvintsev	24	(Ukraine) Dynamo Kyiv	Loan return		
12 January 2018	MF	(Ukraine) Mykyta Kamenyuka	32	(Ukraine) Veres Rivne	Loan		

== Pre-season and friendlies ==
25 June 2017 Friendly	Zorya Luhansk (Ukraine)	3–0	(Ukraine) FC Nikopol	Zaporizhzhia
17:00 EEST (UTC+03:00)	Kharatin 9'; Paulinho 37'; Opanasenko 87'	Report		Stadium: Torpedo Stadium

1 July 2017 Friendly	Zorya Luhansk (Ukraine)	0–2	(Croatia) Istra	Slovenia
19:00 EEST (UTC+03:00)		Report	Gržan 7'; Prelčec 14'

1 July 2017 Friendly	Zorya Luhansk (Ukraine)	1–0	(Croatia) Hajduk Split	Slovenia
19:00 EEST (UTC+03:00)	Rafael Forster 61'	Report

6 July 2017 Friendly	Zorya Luhansk (Ukraine)	3–4	(Romania) CFR Cluj	Slovenia
19:00 EEST (UTC+03:00)	Kharatin 35', 60'; Bezborodko 82'	Report	11'; 51'; 65'; 70'

7 July 2017 Friendly	Zorya Luhansk (Ukraine)	1–1	(Serbia) FK Voždovac	Slovenia
18:00 EEST (UTC+03:00)	Kocherhin 8'	Report	43'

10 July 2017 Friendly	Zorya Luhansk (Ukraine)	0–2	(Russia) Ural Yekaterinburg	Murska Sobota, Slovenia
19:00 EEST (UTC+03:00)		Report	43'; 83'

12 July 2017 Friendly	Zorya Luhansk (Ukraine)	1–1	(Georgia (country)) Dinamo Tbilisi	Slovenia
19:00 EEST (UTC+03:00)	Svatok 52'	Report	60'

2 September 2017 Friendly	Zorya Luhansk (Ukraine)	2–3	(Ukraine) FC Mariupol	Zaporizhzhia
16:00 EEST (UTC+03:00)	Mayboroda 73'; Kharatin 89'	Report	Myshnyov 11'; Vakulenko 59'; Kisil 84'	Stadium: Torpedo Stadium

11 November 2017 Friendly	Zorya Luhansk (Ukraine)	2–0	(Ukraine) FC Metalurh Zaporizhzhia	Zaporizhzhia
EET (UTC+0:00)	Iury 2'; Kabayev 67'	Report

19 January 2018 Friendly	Zorya Luhansk (Ukraine)	1–3	(Poland) Lech Poznań	Belek, Turkey
15:00 EET (UTC+02:00)	Iury 63'	Report	Šitum 35'; Gytkjær 45' (pen.); Jóźwiak 87'

21 January 2018 Friendly	Zorya Luhansk (Ukraine)	1–1	(Croatia) Dinamo Zagreb	Turkey
17:00 EET (UTC+02:00)	Hromov 38'	Report	Gavranović 10'

23 January 2018 Friendly	Zorya Luhansk (Ukraine)	1–2	(Slovakia) Spartak Trnava	Belek, Turkey
10:00 EET (UTC+02:00)	Ljubenović 59'	Report	Chanturishvili 33', 68'

23 January 2018 Friendly	Zorya Luhansk (Ukraine)	3–0	(Uzbekistan) Olmaliq	Turkey
15:30 EET (UTC+02:00)	Hromov 25', 89'; Iury 34'	Report

25 January 2018 Friendly	Zorya Luhansk (Ukraine)	Cancelled	(Poland) Pogoń Szczecin	Turkey
EET (UTC+02:00)		Report

25 January 2018 Friendly	Zorya Luhansk (Ukraine)	3–0	(Georgia (country)) Dinamo Tbilisi	Turkey
15:30 EET (UTC+02:00)	Svatok 44'; Ljubenović 64'; 87' (o.g.)	Report

28 January 2018 Friendly	Zorya Luhansk (Ukraine)	2–2	(Poland) Arka Gdynia	Turkey
16:30 EET (UTC+02:00)	Lunyov 29'; Ljubenović 60'	Report	Żebrakowski 2', 13'

4 February 2018 Friendly	Zorya Luhansk (Ukraine)	5–0	(Bosnia and Herzegovina) Željezničar Sarajevo	Turkey
16:00 EET (UTC+02:00)	Hromov 3', 30'; Cheberko 27'; Iury 35'; Sukhar 74'	Report

8 February 2018 Friendly	Zorya Luhansk (Ukraine)	0–0	(Serbia) Voždovac	Turkey
15:00 EET (UTC+02:00)		Report

10 February 2018 Friendly	Zorya Luhansk (Ukraine)	Cancelled	(Kazakhstan) Shakhter Karagandy	Turkey
EET (UTC+02:00)		Report

10 February 2018 Friendly	Zorya Luhansk (Ukraine)	1–1	(Uzbekistan) AGMK Olmaliq	Turkey
15:15 EET (UTC+02:00)	Kharatin 8' (pen.)	Report	66'

13 February 2018 Friendly	Zorya Luhansk (Ukraine)	Cancelled	(Georgia (country)) Dinamo Tbilisi	Turkey
EET (UTC+02:00)		Report

25 March 2018 Friendly	Zorya Luhansk (Ukraine)	1–1	(Ukraine) FC Oleksandriya	Zaporizhzhia
14:00 EEST (UTC+03:00)	Hordiyenko 38'	Report	Bondarenko 90+1' (pen.)	Stadium: Torpedo Stadium

== Competitions ==
=== Overall ===
Competition	First match	Last match	Starting round	Final position	Record							
Competition	First match	Last match	Starting round	Final position	Pld	W	D	L	GF	GA	GD	Win %
Premier League	16 July 2017	20 May 2018	Matchday 1	4th	32	11	10	11	44	44	+0	34.38
Cup	25 October 2017	25 October 2017	Round of 16 (1/8)	Round of 16 (1/8)	1	0	0	1	3	4	−1	0.00
Europa League	14 September 2017	7 December 2017	Group stage	Group stage (3rd)	6	2	0	4	3	9	−6	33.33
Total					39	13	10	16	50	57	−7	33.33

Last updated: 20 May 2018
Source: Competitions

=== Premier League ===
==== League table ====
Pos	Team	Pld	W	D	L	GF	GA	GD	Pts	Qualification or relegation
2	Dynamo Kyiv	32	22	7	3	64	25	+39	73	Qualification for the Champions League third qualifying round
3	Vorskla Poltava	32	14	7	11	37	35	+2	49	Qualification for the Europa League group stage (Note: Since the winners of the 2017–18 Ukrainian Cup, Shakhtar Donetsk, qualified for European competition based on league position, the spot awarded to the cup winners (Europa League group stage) was passed to the third-placed team, the spot awarded to the third-placed team (Europa League third qualifying round) was passed to the fourth-placed team, and the spot awarded to the fourth-placed team (Europa League second qualifying round) was passed to the fifth-placed team.)
4	Zorya Luhansk	32	11	10	11	44	44	0	43	Qualification for the Europa League third qualifying round
5	FC Mariupol	32	10	9	13	38	41	−3	39	Qualification for the Europa League second qualifying round
6	Veres Rivne (D)	32	7	14	11	28	30	−2	35	Club suspended after the season

Source: Ukrainian Premier League (in Ukrainian), UEFA, Soccerway
Rules for classification: 1) Points; 2) Goal difference; 3) Goals scored; 4) Head-to-head points; 5) Head-to-head goal difference; 6) Head-to-head goals scored; 7) Draw.
(D) Disqualified
Notes:

Team 1	Agg.	Team 2	1st leg	2nd leg
Zirka Kropyvnytskyi	1–5	Desna Chernihiv	1–1	0–4
Chornomorets Odesa	1–3	FC Poltava	1–0	0–3 (a.e.t.)

==== Results summary ====
Overall								Home						Away					
Pld	W	D	L	GF	GA	GD	Pts	W	D	L	GF	GA	GD	W	D	L	GF	GA	GD
32	11	10	11	44	44	0	43	6	5	5	23	20	+3	5	5	6	21	24	−3

Last updated: 20 May 2018.
Source: Competitive matches

==== Results by round ====
Round	1	2	3	4	5	6	7	8	9	10	11	12	13	14	15	16	17	18	19	20	21	22	23	24	25	26	27	28	29	30	31	32
Ground	H	H	A	H	A	A	H	A	H	A	H	A	A	H	A	H	H	A	H	A	H	A	A	A	H	A	H	H	H	A	H	A
Result	L	D	D	L	W	L	W	L	D	D	D	W	W	D	D	D	W	D	W	W	W	L	D	W	L	L	L	W	W	L	L	L
Position	10	9	9	10	8	8	7	7	7	7	7	7	7	7	7	7	6	6	5	4	4	4	4	3	4	4	4	4	4	4	4	4

Updated to match(es) played on 20 May 2018. Source: Competitive matches
A = Away; H = Home; W = Win; D = Draw; L = Loss

==== Matches ====
16 July 2017 1	Zorya Luhansk	0–1	Stal Kamianske	Zaporizhzhia
19:30 EEST (UTC+03:00)	Kharatin (yellow card) 59'	Report	Danielyan (yellow card) 29'; Mykhaylychenko (yellow card) 44'; Yakymiv 60'; Mytsyk (yellow card) 83'; Penkov (yellow card) 90+3'	Stadium: Slavutych-Arena; Attendance: 1,500; Referee: Sehiy Boyko

23 July 2017 2	Zorya Luhansk	1–1	FC Mariupol	Zaporizhzhia
19:30 EEST (UTC+03:00)	Sukhotskyi (yellow card) 39'; Opanasenko 70'	Report	Yavorskyi 16'	Stadium: Slavutych-Arena; Referee: Oleksandr Derdo

30 July 2017 3	FC Oleksandriya	1–1	Zorya Luhansk	Oleksandriya
19:30 EEST (UTC+03:00)	Kulish 6'; Hitchenko (yellow card) 48'; Chebotayev (yellow card) 69'	Report	Pryima (yellow card) 45'; Hrechyshkin 49' (pen.); Iury (yellow card) 57'	Stadium: CSC Nika Stadium; Attendance: 1,400; Referee: Kostyantyn Trukhanov

6 August 2017 4	Zorya Luhansk	0–2	Olimpik Donetsk	Zaporizhzhia
19:30 EEST (UTC+03:00)	Hrechyshkin (yellow card) 25'	Report	Illoy-Ayyet (yellow card) 22'; Kravchenko (yellow card) 40'; Guttiner (yellow card) 41'; Bilenkyi 69'; Moha 86'; Lukhtanov (yellow card) 90+2'	Stadium: Slavutych-Arena; Attendance: 2,863; Referee: Yevhen Aranovsky

12 August 2017 5	Veres Rivne	0–1	Zorya Luhansk	Lviv
17:00 EEST (UTC+03:00)	Stepanyuk (yellow card) 31'	Report	Sukhotskyi (yellow card) 51'; Pryima (yellow card) 62'; Kharatin (yellow card) 68'; Kalitvintsev 76'; Iury (yellow card) 83'	Stadium: Arena Lviv; Attendance: 1,847; Referee: Mykola Kryvonosov

20 August 2017 6	Zirka Kropyvnytskyi	2–1	Zorya Luhansk	Kropyvnytskyi
17:00 EEST (UTC+03:00)	El Hamdaoui 21', (yellow card) 53'; Pryadun 30'; Kovalyov (yellow card) 38'; Guedj (yellow card) 73'	Report	Hromov 19'; Kharatin (yellow card) 50'; Checher (yellow card) 52'	Stadium: Zirka Stadium; Attendance: 2,153; Referee: Denys Shurman

27 August 2017 7	Zorya Luhansk	5–0	Chornomorets Odesa	Zaporizhzhia
19:30 EEST (UTC+03:00)	Iury 2', 9'; Hrechyshkin 26' (pen.); Hordiyenko 40'; Karavayev 81'; Kharatin (yellow card) 83'	Report	Musolitin (yellow card) 15'; Vasin (yellow card) 22'; Žunić (yellow card) 25'; Kapliyenko (yellow card) 50'; Serdenyuk (yellow card) 88'	Stadium: Slavutych-Arena; Attendance: 2,608; Referee: Yaroslav Kozyk

9 September 2017 8	Shakhtar Donetsk	3–1	Zorya Luhansk	Kharkiv
17:00 EEST (UTC+03:00)	Bernard (yellow card) 23', (goal) 89'; Kryvtsov 32'; Ismaily 70'; Khocholava (yellow card) 72'	Report	Hromov 13'	Stadium: Metalist OSC; Attendance: 10,580; Referee: Kateryna Monzul

17 September 2017 9	Zorya Luhansk	0–0	Karpaty Lviv	Zaporizhzhia
17:00 EEST (UTC+03:00)	Hrechyshkin (yellow card) 13'; Lunyov (yellow card) 63'; Andriyevskyi (yellow card) 72' (yellow-red card) 88'	Report	Nesterov (yellow card) 5'; Di Franco (yellow card) 32'; Holodyuk (yellow card) 66'; Fedetskyi (yellow card) 68'; Corteggiano (yellow card) 90+6'	Stadium: Slavutych-Arena; Attendance: 2,367; Referee: Vitaliy Romanov

24 September 2017 10	Vorskla Poltava	1–1	Zorya Luhansk	Poltava
19:30 EEST (UTC+03:00)	Chyzhov (yellow card) 45+2'; Dallku (yellow card) 60'; Kulach (yellow card) 89'; Kolomoyets 90'	Report	Opanasenko 44'; Babenko (yellow card) 69'	Stadium: Vorskla Stadium; Attendance: 3,123; Referee: Mykola Balakin

1 October 2017 11	Zorya Luhansk	4–4	Dynamo Kyiv	Zaporizhzhia
19:30 EEST (UTC+03:00)	Sukhotskyi (yellow card) 31'; Hordiyenko (yellow card) 45'; Kharatin 56' (pen.); Iury (yellow card) 72', (goal) 75'; Silas 80'; Opanasenko 87'; Hrechyshkin (yellow card) 90+2'	Report	Mbokani 14', (yellow card) 90+2'; Buyalskyi 32'; Moraes 45+1'; Vida (yellow card) 55'; Khacheridi (yellow card) 71'; Tsyhankov (yellow card) 79'; Harmash 82', (yellow card) 83'	Stadium: Slavutych-Arena; Attendance: 8,253; Referee: Yaroslav Kozyk

14 October 2017 12	Stal Kamianske	0–1	Zorya Luhansk	Kyiv
17:00 EEST (UTC+03:00)	Gor Malakyan (yellow card) 22'; Edgar Malakyan (yellow card) 46'	Report	Pryima 57'; Hordiyenko (yellow card) 59'	Stadium: Obolon Arena; Attendance: 570; Referee: Viktor Kopiyevskyi

22 October 2017 13	FC Mariupol	2–5	Zorya Luhansk	Mariupol
17:00 EEST (UTC+03:00)	Bilyi 6'; Kozhanov 31'; Vakulenko (yellow card) 38' (yellow-red card) 49'; Tankovskyi (yellow card) 90+2'	Report	Andriyevskyi 29', 38', 63'; Hrechyshkin 34' (pen.); Ljubenović (yellow card) 41'; Sukhotskyi (yellow card) 54'; Silas (yellow card) 56'; Opanasenko 90+1'	Stadium: Volodymyr Boiko Stadium; Attendance: 6,881; Referee: Kostyantyn Trukhanov

29 October 2017 14	Zorya Luhansk	2–2	FC Oleksandriya	Zaporizhzhia
17:00 EET (UTC+02:00)	Iury 11', (yellow card) 44'; Hromov 34'; Kharatin (yellow card) 45+1'	Report	Ponomar (yellow card) 17' (yellow-red card) 80'; Chebotayev (yellow card) 40'; Starenkyi 54'; Zaporozhan (yellow card) 65'; Bondarenko 70'; Batsula (yellow card) 72'	Stadium: Slavutych-Arena; Attendance: 1,200; Referee: Dmytro Kutakov

5 November 2017 15	Olimpik Donetsk	3–3	Zorya Luhansk	Kyiv
19:30 EET (UTC+02:00)	Kravchenko 11'; Moha (yellow card) 35'; Bilenkyi 48'; Shabanov (yellow card) 49'; Lukyanchuk (yellow card) 59'; Bohdanov 67'; Makharadze (yellow card) 90+2'	Report	Lunyov (yellow card) 57', (goal) 62'; Andriyevskyi (red card) 70'; Opanasenko 83'; Kharatin 90+4'	Stadium: Dynamo Stadium; Attendance: 1,000; Referee: Yuriy Mozharovskyi

18 November 2017 16	Zorya Luhansk	1–1	Veres Rivne	Zaporizhzhia
14:00 EET (UTC+02:00)	Hromov 28'; Iury (yellow card) 90+3'	Report	Serhiychuk (yellow card) 24'; Ischenko (yellow card) 36' (yellow-red card) 58'; Adamyuk 61'; Bandura (yellow card) 87'; Kobin (yellow card) 90+3'	Stadium: Slavutych-Arena; Attendance: 1,850; Referee: Mykola Kryvonosov

26 November 2017 17	Zorya Luhansk	1–0	Zirka Kropyvnytskyi	Zaporizhzhia
19:30 EET (UTC+02:00)	Sukhotskyi (yellow card) 39'; Hromov 58'; Checher (yellow card) 69'	Report	Matkobozhyk (yellow card) 77'	Stadium: Slavutych-Arena; Attendance: 1,627; Referee: Mykola Balakin

2 December 2017 18	Chornomorets Odesa	1–1	Zorya Luhansk	Odesa
14:00 EET (UTC+02:00)	Vasin (yellow card) 17' (yellow-red card) 18'; Khoblenko (yellow card) 18', (goal) 72'; N'Diaye (yellow card) 45' (yellow-red card) 77'; Žunić (yellow card) 53'; Politylo (yellow card) 90+4'	Report	Babenko (yellow card) 13' (yellow-red card) 33'; Kharatin (yellow card) 20'; Svatok 66'; Andriyevskyi (yellow card) 87'	Stadium: Chornomorets Stadium; Attendance: 4,242; Referee: Vitaliy Romanov

10 December 2017 19	Zorya Luhansk	2–1	Shakhtar Donetsk	Zaporizhzhia
19:30 EET (UTC+02:00)	Kabayev (yellow card) 47'; Silas (yellow card) 67', (goal) 90+2' (pen.); Butko 66' (o.g.)	Report	Petryak (yellow card) 18' (yellow-red card) 79', (goal) 34'; Bernard (yellow card) 51'; Fred (yellow card) 53' (yellow-red card) 86'; Stepanenko (yellow card) 56'; Dentinho (yellow card) 80'; Rakitskiy (yellow card) 90' (yellow-red card) 90'	Stadium: Slavutych-Arena; Attendance: 3,758; Referee: Serhiy Boyko

18 February 2018 20	Karpaty Lviv	0–2	Zorya Luhansk	Lviv
14:00 EET (UTC+02:00)	Lobay (yellow card) 43'; Klyots (yellow card) 45'; Fedetskyi (yellow card) 67'	Report	Cheberko (yellow card) 54'; Tymchyk 55'; Iury (yellow card) 57', (goal) 72'; Faupala (yellow card) 63'; Checher (yellow card) 80'; Kabayev (yellow card) 89'	Stadium: Ukraina Stadium; Attendance: 1,853; Referee: Kostyantyn Trukhanov

24 February 2018 21	Zorya Luhansk	3–0	Vorskla Poltava	Zaporizhzhia
14:00 EET (UTC+02:00)	Checher (yellow card) 53'; Hordiyenko 71'; Iury 76'; Hromov 88'	Report	Kolomoyets (yellow card) 39'; Sapay (yellow card) 39'; Kulach (yellow card) 45+2'; Vasin (yellow card) 64' (yellow-red card) 68'	Stadium: Slavutych-Arena; Attendance: 1,625; Referee: Dmytro Kutakov

4 March 2018 22	Dynamo Kyiv	3–2	Zorya Luhansk	Kyiv
17:00 EET (UTC+02:00)	Boyko (yellow card) 11'; Verbič 58'; Tsyhankov 77'; Pivarić (yellow card) 83'; Kędziora 90+2'	Report	Hromov (yellow card) 28'; Silas (yellow card) 29'; Kharatin 49'; Iury 61'; Svatok (yellow card) 75'	Stadium: NSC Olimpiyskiy; Attendance: 4,317; Referee: Anatoliy Abdula

11 March 2018 23	FC Mariupol	0–0	Zorya Luhansk	Mariupol
17:00 EET (UTC+02:00)	Totovytskyi (yellow card) 6'; Myshnyov (yellow card) 13'; Dedechko (yellow card) 36'; Bolbat (yellow card) 56'; Demiri (yellow card) 73'	Report	Andriyevskyi (yellow card) 62'; Svatok (yellow card) 80'; Iury (yellow card) 87'	Stadium: Volodymyr Boiko Stadium; Attendance: 2,613; Referee: Ievgenii Aranovskyi

18 March 2018 24	Veres Rivne	0–1	Zorya Luhansk	Lviv
17:00 EET (UTC+02:00)	Lukyanchuk (yellow card) 27'; Karasyuk (yellow card) 64'; Kalenchuk (yellow card) 87'	Report	Kharatin (yellow card) 19'; Checher (yellow card) 28'; Lunyov (yellow card) 45'; Iury 51' (pen.)	Stadium: Arena Lviv; Attendance: 413; Referee: Dmytro Kutakov

1 April 2018 25	Zorya Luhansk	0–3	Shakhtar Donetsk	Zaporizhzhia
19:30 EEST (UTC+03:00)	Lunyov (yellow card) 27'; Checher (yellow card) 41'; Silas (yellow card) 63'; Pryima (yellow card) 70'; Opanasenko (red card) 88'; Tymchyk (yellow card) 90+2'; Iury (yellow card) 90+5'	Report	Ismaily (yellow card) 25'; Taison 41'; Ferreyra 61', (yellow card) 90+1'; Fred (yellow card) 85'; Kayode 90+4'; Dentinho (yellow card) 90+5'	Stadium: Slavutych-Arena; Attendance: 8,350; Referee: Vitaliy Romanov

7 April 2018 26	Dynamo Kyiv	4–0	Zorya Luhansk	Kyiv
14:00 EEST (UTC+03:00)	Burda 13'; Verbič 51'; Besyedin 54'; Tsyhankov 88'	Report	Hromov (yellow card) 48'; Checher (yellow card) 72'; Babenko (yellow card) 79'	Stadium: Dynamo Stadium; Attendance: 12,876; Referee: Oleksandr Derdo

15 April 2018 27	Zorya Luhansk	0–3	Vorskla Poltava	Zaporizhzhia
19:30 EEST (UTC+03:00)	Cheberko (yellow card) 84'	Report	Chesnakov 50', (yellow card) 83'; Sharpar (yellow card) 55'; Vasin (yellow card) 65'; Kulach 73'; Odaryuk (yellow card) 81'; Serhiychuk 90+1'	Stadium: Slavutych-Arena; Attendance: 2,125; Referee: Viktor Kopiyevskyi

22 April 2018 28	Zorya Luhansk	3–1	FC Mariupol	Zaporizhzhia
14:00 EEST (UTC+03:00)	Iury 67', (yellow card) 69'; Hordiyenko 75'; Hromov 90+2'	Report	Dawa (yellow card) 18'; Ihnatenko (yellow card) 23'; Myshnyov 30'; Yavorskyi (yellow card) 69'; Totovytskyi (yellow card) 80'; Kyryukhantsev (red card) 80'; Bilyi (yellow card) 82'; Dedechko (yellow card) 87'	Stadium: Slavutych-Arena; Attendance: 2,075; Referee: Yuriy Mozharovskyi

29 April 2018 29	Zorya Luhansk	1–0	Veres Rivne	Zaporizhzhia
14:00 EEST (UTC+03:00)	Checher (yellow card) 8'; Iury (yellow card) 18', (goal) 59'; Andriyevskyi (yellow card) 88'; Kabayev (yellow card) 90+1'	Report	Siminin (yellow card) 31'; Pepi (yellow card) 41'; Adamyuk (red card) 50'; Myahkov (yellow card) 81'	Stadium: Slavutych-Arena; Attendance: 2,081; Referee: Denys Shurman

5 May 2018 30	Shakhtar Donetsk	2–1	Zorya Luhansk	Kharkiv
19:30 EEST (UTC+03:00)	Ferreyra 19', (yellow card) 33'; Taison 89'; Nem (yellow card) 90+2'; Pyatov (yellow card) 90+3'	Report	Silas (yellow card) 34'; Hordiyenko (yellow card) 35'; Cheberko (yellow card) 50'; Iury 63', (yellow card) 63'; Lytvyn (yellow card) 90+3'	Stadium: Metalist OSC; Attendance: 7,695; Referee: Vitaliy Romanov

13 May 2018 31	Zorya Luhansk	0–1	Dynamo Kyiv	Zaporizhzhia
19:30 EEST (UTC+03:00)	Hordiyenko (yellow card) 15'; Kharatin (yellow card) 27'; Silas (yellow card) 39'; Kocherhin (yellow card) 60'; Checher (yellow card) 77'	Report	Verbič 68'; Besyedin (yellow card) 81'; Kádár (yellow card) 84'	Stadium: Slavutych-Arena; Attendance: 6,256; Referee: Viktor Kopiyevskyi

20 May 2018 32	Vorskla Poltava	2–0	Zorya Luhansk	Poltava
17:00 EEST (UTC+03:00)	Kulach 66', (yellow card) 67'; Rebenok (yellow card) 87'; Vasin 90+2'	Report	Iury (yellow card) 41'; Opanasenko (yellow card) 89'	Stadium: Vorskla Stadium; Attendance: 11,633; Referee: Kostyantyn Trukhanov

=== Ukrainian Cup ===
25 October 2017 Round of 16 (1/8)	Zorya Luhansk	3–4	Shakhtar Donetsk	Zaporizhzhia
19:00 EEST (UTC+03:00)	Lunyov 12'; Babenko (yellow card) 39'; Hordiyenko 51'; Lunin (yellow card) 68'; Checher (yellow card) 78' (yellow-red card) 82'; Opanasenko (yellow card) 95'; Kharatin 107'	Report	Stepanenko (yellow card) 38'; Dentinho (yellow card) 34'; Fred (yellow card) 59'; Ferreyra 72', 90+1'; Kovalenko 99'; Blanco Leschuk 117'	Stadium: Slavutych-Arena; Attendance: 5,511; Referee: Anatoliy Abdula

=== UEFA Europa League ===
Pos	Team	Pld	W	D	L	GF	GA	GD	Pts	Qualification	ATH	OST	ZOR	HRT
1	(Spain) Athletic Bilbao	6	3	2	1	8	5	+3	11 (Note: Head-to-head results: Östersund 2–2 Athletic Bilbao, Athletic Bilbao 1–0 Östersund.)	Advance to knockout phase	—	1–0	0–1	3–2
2	(Sweden) Östersunds FK	6	3	2	1	8	4	+4	11	Advance to knockout phase	2–2	—	2–0	1–0
3	(Ukraine) Zorya Luhansk	6	2	0	4	3	9	−6	6		0–2	0–2	—	2–1
4	(Germany) Hertha BSC	6	1	2	3	6	7	−1	5		0–0	1–1	2–0	—

Source: UEFA
Rules for classification: Group stage tiebreakers
Notes:

14 September 2017 1	Zorya Luhansk (Ukraine)	0–2	(Sweden) Östersund	Lviv
22:05 EEST (UTC+03:00)	Kharatin (yellow card) 79'	Report	Bachirou (yellow card) 43'; Ghoddos 50'; Mensiro (yellow card) 72'; Aiesh (yellow card) 83'; Gero 90+4'	Stadium: Arena Lviv; Referee: Stephan Klossner

28 September 2017 2	Athletic Bilbao (Spain)	0–1	(Ukraine) Zorya Luhansk	Bilbao, Spain
20:00 EEST (UTC+03:00)		Report	Kharatin 26'; Opanasenko (yellow card) 58'; Hordiyenko (yellow card) 68'; Andriyevskyi (yellow card) 81'; Kocherhin (yellow card) 90+2'	Stadium: San Mamés; Referee: Halis Özkahya

19 October 2017 3	Zorya Luhansk (Ukraine)	2–1	(Germany) Hertha BSC	Lviv
20:00 EEST (UTC+03:00)	Silas (yellow card) 4', (goal) 42'; Lunyov (yellow card) 76'; Svatok 79'	Report	Selke (yellow card) 46', (goal) 56'; Maier (yellow card) 69'; Ibišević (yellow card) 71'	Stadium: Arena Lviv; Referee: Liran Liany

2 November 2017 4	Hertha BSC (Germany)	2–0	(Ukraine) Zorya Luhansk	Berlin, Germany
22:00 EEST (UTC+03:00)	Selke 13', 73'	Report	Karavayev (yellow card) 69'; Sukhotskyi (yellow card) 79'	Stadium: Olympiastadion; Referee: John Beaton

23 November 2017 5	Östersund (Sweden)	2–0	(Ukraine) Zorya Luhansk	Östersund, Sweden
20:00 EET (UTC+02:00)	Hrechyshkin 40' (o.g.); Edwards (yellow card) 51'; Ghoddos 77'	Report	Andriyevskyi (yellow card) 53'; Karavayev (yellow card) 54'; Babenko (yellow card) 79'; Svatok (yellow card) 82'	Stadium: Jämtkraft Arena; Referee: Kevin Blom

7 December 2017 6	Zorya Luhansk (Ukraine)	0–2	(Spain) Athletic Bilbao	Lviv
22:00 EET (UTC+02:00)	Lunyov (yellow card) 43'; Andriyevskyi (yellow card) 50'; Kabayev (yellow card) 82'	Report	Unai Núñez (yellow card) 16'; Aduriz 70'; Raúl García 86'	Stadium: Arena Lviv; Referee: Ruddy Buquet

== Statistics ==
=== Appearances and goals ===
No.	Pos	Nat	Player	Total		Premier League		Cup		Europa League	
No.	Pos	Nat	Player	Apps	Goals	Apps	Goals	Apps	Goals	Apps	Goals
Goalkeepers
1	GK	(Ukraine) UKR	Andriy Lunin	36	0	29	0	1	0	6	0
Defenders
3	DF	(Ukraine) UKR	Oleksandr Svatok	32	2	22+3	1	1	0	5+1	1
4	DF	(Ukraine) UKR	Vasyl Pryima	13	1	9+3	1	0	0	1	0
5	DF	(Ukraine) UKR	Artem Hordiyenko	35	4	21+7	3	1	1	4+2	0
9	DF	(Ukraine) UKR	Dmytro Lytvyn	2	0	1+1	0	0	0	0	0
16	DF	(Morocco) MAR	Mohamed El Bouazzati	2	0	2	0	0	0	0	0
24	DF	(Ukraine) UKR	Oleksandr Tymchyk	8	1	8	1	0	0	0	0
39	DF	(Ukraine) UKR	Yevhen Opanasenko	27	5	21+1	5	1	0	4	0
44	DF	(Ukraine) UKR	Vyacheslav Checher	21	0	17+1	0	1	0	1+1	0
Midfielders
7	MF	(Ukraine) UKR	Vladyslav Kocherhin	14	0	4+7	0	0+1	0	0+2	0
8	MF	(Ukraine) UKR	Ihor Kharatin	36	5	22+7	3	0+1	1	5+1	1
18	MF	(Ukraine) UKR	Oleksandr Andriyevskyi	24	3	14+3	3	1	0	5+1	0
20	MF	(Ukraine) UKR	Oleksandr Karavayev	33	1	25+1	1	1	0	6	0
22	MF	(Serbia) SRB	Željko Ljubenović	8	0	1+6	0	0	0	0+1	0
27	MF	(Ukraine) UKR	Vladyslav Kabayev	15	0	4+9	0	0	0	0+2	0
28	MF	(Ukraine) UKR	Artem Hromov	34	7	27	7	1	0	4+2	0
36	MF	(Ukraine) UKR	Ruslan Babenko	17	0	10+4	0	1	0	1+1	0
64	MF	(Ukraine) UKR	Serhiy Mayboroda	2	0	0+2	0	0	0	0	0
76	MF	(Ukraine) UKR	Yehor Shalfeyev	1	0	0+1	0	0	0	0	0
96	MF	(Brazil) BRA	Silas	25	3	17+3	2	0	0	3+2	1
98	MF	(Ukraine) UKR	Yevhen Cheberko	10	0	10	0	0	0	0	0
Forwards
11	FW	(France) FRA	David Faupala	12	0	9+3	0	0	0	0	0
19	FW	(Ukraine) UKR	Maksym Lunyov	30	2	12+11	1	1	1	5+1	0
95	FW	(Brazil) BRA	Iury	29	11	22+2	11	0	0	5	0
Players transferred out during the season
1	GK	(Ukraine) UKR	Oleksiy Shevchenko	3	0	3	0	0	0	0	0
2	DF	(Ukraine) UKR	Artem Sukhotskyi	24	0	17	0	1	0	6	0
6	MF	(Ukraine) UKR	Mykyta Kamenyuka	1	0	0	0	0+1	0	0	0
9	MF	(Ukraine) UKR	Vladyslav Kalitvintsev	6	1	5+1	1	0	0	0	0
10	MF	(Brazil) BRA	Leônidas	2	0	0+1	0	0	0	0+1	0
11	FW	(Brazil) BRA	Paulinho	4	0	3+1	0	0	0	0	0
12	DF	(Brazil) BRA	Rafael Forster	1	0	1	0	0	0	0	0
21	FW	(Ukraine) UKR	Denys Bezborodko	1	0	1	0	0	0	0	0
24	MF	(Ukraine) UKR	Dmytro Hrechyshkin	22	3	15+2	3	0	0	5	0

Source: Competitions

Last updated: 20 May 2018

=== Goalscorers ===
Rank	No.	Pos	Nat	Name	Premier League	Cup	Europa League	Total
1	95	FW	(Brazil)	Iury	11	0	0	11
2	28	MF	(Ukraine)	Artem Hromov	7	0	0	7
3	8	MF	(Ukraine)	Ihor Kharatin	3	1	1	5
3	39	DF	(Ukraine)	Yevhen Opanasenko	5	0	0	5
5	5	DF	(Ukraine)	Artem Hordiyenko	3	1	0	4
6	18	MF	(Ukraine)	Oleksandr Andriyevskyi	3	0	0	3
6	24	MF	(Ukraine)	Dmytro Hrechyshkin	3	0	0	3
6	96	MF	(Brazil)	Silas	2	0	1	3
9	3	DF	(Ukraine)	Oleksandr Svatok	1	0	1	2
9	19	FW	(Ukraine)	Maksym Lunyov	1	1	0	2
11	4	DF	(Ukraine)	Vasyl Pryima	1	0	0	1
11	9	MF	(Ukraine)	Vladyslav Kalitvintsev	1	0	0	1
11	20	MF	(Ukraine)	Oleksandr Karavayev	1	0	0	1
11	24	DF	(Ukraine)	Oleksandr Tymchyk	1	0	0	1
				Own goal	1	0	0	1
				Total	44	3	3	50

Last updated: 20 May 2018

=== Clean sheets ===
Rank	No.	Pos	Nat	Name	Premier League	Cup	Europa League	Total
1	1	GK	(Ukraine)	Andriy Lunin	9	0	1	10
2	1	GK	(Ukraine)	Oleksiy Shevchenko	1	0	0	1
				Total	10	0	1	11

Last updated: 20 May 2018

=== Disciplinary record ===
No.	Pos	Nat	Player	Premier League			Cup			Europa League			Total		
No.	Pos	Nat	Player	Booked	(yellow card) (yellow-red card)	Sent off (straight red)	Booked	(yellow card) (yellow-red card)	Sent off (straight red)	Booked	(yellow card) (yellow-red card)	Sent off (straight red)	Booked	(yellow card) (yellow-red card)	Sent off (straight red)
1	GK	(Ukraine)	Andriy Lunin	0	0	0	1	0	0	0	0	0	1	0	0
2	DF	(Ukraine)	Artem Sukhotskyi	5	0	0	0	0	0	1	0	0	6	0	0
3	DF	(Ukraine)	Oleksandr Svatok	2	0	0	0	0	0	1	0	0	3	0	0
4	DF	(Ukraine)	Vasyl Pryima	3	0	0	0	0	0	0	0	0	3	0	0
5	DF	(Ukraine)	Artem Hordiyenko	4	0	0	0	0	0	1	0	0	5	0	0
7	MF	(Ukraine)	Vladyslav Kocherhin	1	0	0	0	0	0	1	0	0	2	0	0
8	MF	(Ukraine)	Ihor Kharatin	8	0	0	0	0	0	1	0	0	9	0	0
9	DF	(Ukraine)	Dmytro Lytvyn	1	0	0	0	0	0	0	0	0	1	0	0
11	FW	(France)	David Faupala	1	0	0	0	0	0	0	0	0	1	0	0
18	MF	(Ukraine)	Oleksandr Andriyevskyi	3	1	1	0	0	0	3	0	0	6	1	1
19	FW	(Ukraine)	Maksym Lunyov	4	0	0	0	0	0	2	0	0	6	0	0
20	MF	(Ukraine)	Oleksandr Karavayev	0	0	0	0	0	0	2	0	0	2	0	0
22	MF	(Serbia)	Željko Ljubenović	1	0	0	0	0	0	0	0	0	1	0	0
24	MF	(Ukraine)	Dmytro Hrechyshkin	3	0	0	0	0	0	0	0	0	3	0	0
24	DF	(Ukraine)	Oleksandr Tymchyk	1	0	0	0	0	0	0	0	0	1	0	0
27	MF	(Ukraine)	Vladyslav Kabayev	3	0	0	0	0	0	1	0	0	4	0	0
28	MF	(Ukraine)	Artem Hromov	2	0	0	0	0	0	0	0	0	'2	0	0
36	MF	(Ukraine)	Ruslan Babenko	2	1	0	1	0	0	1	0	0	4	1	0
39	DF	(Ukraine)	Yevhen Opanasenko	1	0	1	1	0	0	1	0	0	3	0	1
44	DF	(Ukraine)	Vyacheslav Checher	9	0	0	0	1	0	0	0	0	9	1	0
95	FW	(Brazil)	Iury	13	0	0	0	0	0	0	0	0	13	0	0
96	MF	(Brazil)	Silas	5	0	0	0	0	0	1	0	0	6	0	0
98	MF	(Ukraine)	Yevhen Cheberko	3	0	0	0	0	0	0	0	0	3	0	0
			Total	75	2	2	3	1	0	16	0	0	94	3	2

Last updated: 20 May 2018
