= Nico Knystock =

German footballer (born 1995)

Personal information
- Date of birth: 19 October 1995 (age 31)
- Place of birth: Osnabrück, Germany
- Height: 1.67 m (5 ft 6 in)
- Position: Left-back

Team information
- Current team: VfB Oldenburg
- Number: 44

Youth career
- –2009: VfL Osnabrück
- 2009–2014: Borussia Dortmund

Senior career*
Years	Team	Apps	(Gls)
2014–2016	Borussia Dortmund II	31	(0)
2016–2020	SV Rödinghausen	62	(3)
2020–	VfB Oldenburg	150	(6)
- * Club domestic league appearances and goals as of 22 September 2026

Nico Knystock (born 19 October 1995) is a German footballer who plays for VfB Oldenburg in the Regionalliga Nord. He plays as a left-back.

== Club career ==
Knystock was born in Osnabrück. He joined Borussia Dortmund in 2009 from VfL Osnabrück. He made his professional debut in the 3. Liga at 22 August 2014 against SG Sonnenhof Großaspach. He played the first 87 minutes of the game, before being substituted by Mohamed El Bouazzati.
