= Oleksandr Svatok =

Ukrainian footballer (born 1994)

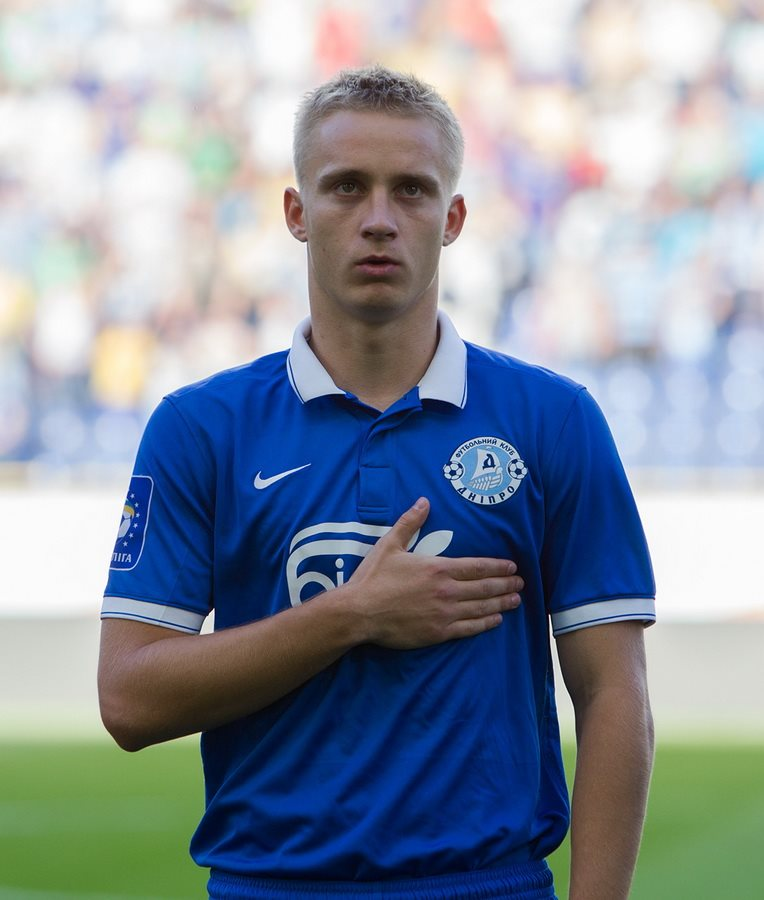

Personal information
- Full name: Oleksandr Serhiyovych Svatok
- Date of birth: 27 September 1994 (age 32)
- Place of birth: Kamianske, Ukraine
- Height: 1.85 m (6 ft 1 in)
- Position: Centre-back

Team information
- Current team: Austin FC
- Number: 5

Youth career
- 2006–2007: Inter Dnipropetrovsk
- 2007–2011: Dnipro Dnipropetrovsk

Senior career*
Years	Team	Apps	(Gls)
2011–2017	Dnipro Dnipropetrovsk	39	(0)
2014	→ Volyn Lutsk (loan)	4	(0)
2017–2018	Zorya Luhansk	41	(1)
2019	Hajduk Split	16	(0)
2020–2024	Dnipro-1	90	(2)
2024–	Austin FC	62	(2)

International career^{‡}
2012	Ukraine U18	4	(0)
2012–2013	Ukraine U19	8	(0)
2014–2017	Ukraine U21	33	(3)
2023–	Ukraine	11	(0)
- * Club domestic league appearances and goals as of 19:56, 8 November 2026 (UTC) ‡ National team caps and goals as of 01:15, 18 November 2025 (UTC)

Oleksandr Serhiyovych Svatok (Ukrainian: Олекса́ндр Сергі́йович Свато́к; born 27 September 1994) is a Ukrainian professional footballer who plays as a centre-back for Major League Soccer club Austin FC and the Ukraine national team.

== Club career ==
Svatok is a product of the FC Dnipro youth sportive school and signed a contract with this club in the Ukrainian Premier League in 2011.

He played 4 years for FC Dnipro Dnipropetrovsk Reserves and Youth Team in the Ukrainian Premier League Reserves Championship and in August 2014 went on loan to FC Volyn in the Ukrainian Premier League. Svatok made his debut for FC Volyn playing first time in a match against FC Zorya Luhansk on 31 August 2014 in the Ukrainian Premier League.

On 15 February 2019, Svatok joined Croatian club Hajduk Split on a 3,5 year deal.

On 28 December 2019, Svatok joined Ukrainian club Dnipro-1.

On 24 June 2024, Svatok signed with Major League Soccer side Austin FC on a three-and-a-half-year deal.

== International career ==
On 26 March 2023, Oleksandr Svatok honoured his first team selection from Ukraine against England in UEFA Euro 2024 qualifying.

In May 2024, he was one of 26 players selected by Serhiy Rebrov to compete for UEFA Euro 2024.

== Career statistics ==
=== Club ===
As of match played 31 October 2026

Appearances and goals by club, season and competition
Club	Season	League			League Cup		National cup (Note: Includes appearances in Ukrainian Cup and U.S. Open Cup)		Continental		Other		Total	
Club	Season	Division	Apps	Goals	Apps	Goals	Apps	Goals	Apps	Goals	Apps	Goals	Apps	Goals
Dnipro	2013–14	Ukrainian Premier League	—		—		—		1 (Note: Appearances in UEFA Europa League)	0	—		1	0
Dnipro	2014–15	Ukrainian Premier League	5	0	—		1	0	0	0	0	0	6	0
Dnipro	2015–16	Ukrainian Premier League	3	0	—		2	0	0	0	0	0	5	0
Dnipro	2016–17	Ukrainian Premier League	31	0	—		3	0	0	0	0	0	34	0
Dnipro	Total		39	0	—		6	0	1	0	0	0	46	0
Volyn Lutsk (loan)	2014–15	Ukrainian Premier League	4	0	—		0	0	—		—		4	0
Zorya Luhansk	2017–18	Ukrainian Premier League	25	1	—		1	0	6	1	—		32	1
Zorya Luhansk	2018–19	Ukrainian Premier League	16	0	—		1	0	4	0	—		21	0
Zorya Luhansk	Total		41	1	—		2	0	10	1	—		53	1
Hajduk Split	2018–19	SuperSport HNL	10	0	—		—		—		—		10	0
Hajduk Split	2019–20	SuperSport HNL	6	0	—		0	0	2	0	0	0	8	0
Hajduk Split	Total		16	0	—		0	0	2	0	0	0	18	0
Dnipro-1	2019–20	Ukrainian Premier League	7	0	—		0	0	—		—		7	0
Dnipro-1	2020–21	Ukrainian Premier League	16	1	—		1	0	—		—		17	1
Dnipro-1	2021–22	Ukrainian Premier League	18	0	—		1	0	—		—		19	0
Dnipro-1	2022–23	Ukrainian Premier League	25	0	—		0	0	10 (Note: Two appearances UEFA Europa League, and eight appearances in UEFA Europa Conference League)	1	—		35	1
Dnipro-1	2023–24	Ukrainian Premier League	24	1	—		1	0	6 (Note: Two appearances in UEFA Champions League, two appearances in UEFA Europa League, and two appearances in UEFA Europa Conference League)	0	—		31	0
Dnipro-1	Total		90	2	—		3	0	16	1	0	0	109	3
Austin FC	2024	Major League Soccer	6	0	—		—		—		0	0	6	0
Austin FC	2025	Major League Soccer	29	1	2 (Note: Includes appearances in MLS Cup playoffs)	0	3	0	—		—		34	1
Austin FC	2026	Major League Soccer	27	1	0	0	1	0	—		4 (Note: Includes appearances in Leagues Cup)	0	31	1
Austin FC	Total		62	2	2	0	4	0	0	0	4	0	73	2
Career total			248	3	2	0	15	0	29	2	4	0	298	5

=== International ===
As of match played 16 November 2025

Appearances and goals by national team and year
National team	Year	Apps	Goals
Ukraine	2023	5	0
Ukraine	2024	3	0
Ukraine	2025	3	0
Total		11	0

== Honors ==
Dnipro

- UEFA Europa League runner-up: 2014–15
