= Mateus Norton =

Brazilian footballer

Personal information
- Full name: Mateus Norton Gomes Chaves
- Date of birth: 19 July 1996 (age 30)
- Place of birth: Campo Bom, Brazil
- Height: 1.75 m (5 ft 9 in)
- Position: Midfielder

Team information
- Current team: Bento Gonçalves

Youth career
- Aimoré

Senior career*
Years	Team	Apps	(Gls)
2016	Aimoré	12	(3)
2016–2018	Fluminense	22	(0)
2019	Zorya Luhansk	1	(0)
2020	Itumbiara	5	(0)
2021–	Bento Gonçalves	0	(0)
- * Club domestic league appearances and goals as of 20:30, 1 March 2021 (UTC)

Mateus Norton Gomes Chaves (born 19 July 1996), simply known as Mateus Norton, is a Brazilian professional footballer who plays as a midfielder for Bento Gonçalves.
