= Nemanja Ivanović =

Serbian footballer

Personal information
- Date of birth: 14 May 1997 (age 29)
- Place of birth: Belgrade, FR Yugoslavia
- Height: 1.85 m (6 ft 1 in)
- Position: Striker

Youth career
- Red Star Belgrade

Senior career*
Years	Team	Apps	(Gls)
2015	Jagodina	0	(0)
2016–2018	Sinđelić Beograd	87	(22)
2019–2020	Zorya Luhansk	6	(0)
2020	Zlatibor Čajetina	6	(0)
2021	Proleter Novi Sad	11	(0)
2021	Mladost Lučani	5	(0)
2022	Budućnost Dobanovci	5	(0)

International career^{‡}
2013	Serbia U17	3	(0)
- * Club domestic league appearances and goals as of 6 August 2023 ‡ National team caps and goals as of 5 March 2019

Nemanja Ivanović (Serbian Cyrillic: Немања Ивановић; born 14 May 1997) is a Serbian professional footballer who plays as a striker.

== Career ==
Ivanović is a product of Red Star Belgrade youth sportive school.

In January 2019, Ivanović signed a two years contract with FC Zorya Luhansk from the Ukrainian Premier League.
