= Maksym Kazakov =

Ukrainian footballer

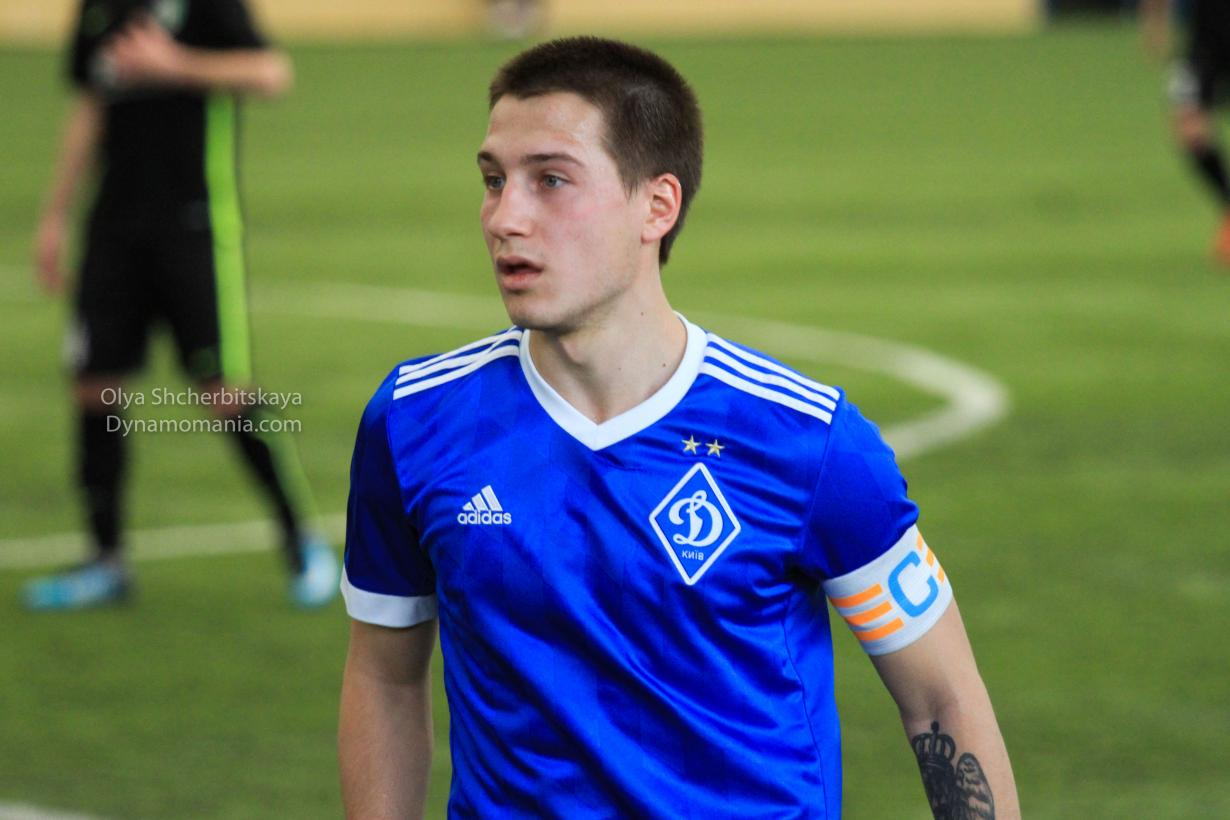

Personal information
- Full name: Maksym Ihorovych Kazakov
- Date of birth: 6 February 1996 (age 30)
- Place of birth: Kyiv, Ukraine
- Height: 1.78 m (5 ft 10 in)
- Position: Midfielder

Team information
- Current team: UCSA Tarasivka
- Number: 80

Youth career
- 2006–2011: Dynamo Kyiv
- 2012–2013: Arsenal Kyiv

Senior career*
Years	Team	Apps	(Gls)
2013	Arsenal Kyiv	0	(0)
2014–2018	Dynamo Kyiv	0	(0)
2018–2023	Zorya Luhansk	8	(0)
2023–2024	Druzhba Myrivka	20	(3)
2024–	UCSA Tarasivka	17	(3)

International career^{‡}
2015	Ukraine U19	1	(0)
- * Club domestic league appearances and goals as of 10 June 2025 ‡ National team caps and goals as of 22 June 2023

Maksym Ihorovych Kazakov (Ukrainian: Максим Ігорович Казаков; born 6 February 1996) is a Ukrainian professional footballer who plays for UCSA Tarasivka.

== Club career ==
He made his Ukrainian Premier League debut for FC Zorya Luhansk on 2 September 2018 in a game against FC Arsenal Kyiv.
