= Serhiy Mayboroda =

Ukrainian footballer

Personal information
- Full name: Serhiy Serhiyovych Mayboroda
- Date of birth: 21 November 1997 (age 28)
- Place of birth: Bylbasivka, Ukraine
- Height: 1.76 m (5 ft 9 in)
- Position: Midfielder

Team information
- Current team: Dinaz Vyshhorod
- Number: 21

Youth career
- 2010–2013: Olimpik Donetsk

Senior career*
Years	Team	Apps	(Gls)
2016–2020	Zorya Luhansk	5	(1)
2020	Avanhard Kramatorsk	9	(1)
2021	Uzhhorod	10	(4)
2021–	Dinaz Vyshhorod	15	(2)
- * Club domestic league appearances and goals as of 9 February 2025

Serhiy Serhiyovych Mayboroda (Ukrainian: Сергій Сергійович Майборода; born 21 November 1997) is a Ukrainian professional football midfielder who plays for Dinaz Vyshhorod.

== Career ==
Born in Bylbasivka, Sloviansk Raion, Mayboroda is a product of FC Olimpik Donetsk youth sportive school system.

He made his debut for FC Zorya as a substituted player in the second half-time in the match against FC Vorskla Poltava on 24 September 2017 in the Ukrainian Premier League.

== Personal life ==
Father of Serhiy, Serhiy Maiboroda was a marine infantryman who was killed by the Russian occupation forces in 2019.
