= Dmytro Lytvyn =

Ukrainian footballer

Personal information
- Full name: Dmytro Andriyovych Lytvyn
- Date of birth: 21 November 1996 (age 29)
- Place of birth: Myronivka, Ukraine
- Height: 1.93 m (6 ft 4 in)
- Position: Defender

Team information
- Current team: Kuala Lumpur City
- Number: 96

Youth career
- 2006–2011: Dynamo Kyiv
- 2011–2012: Arsenal Kyiv
- 2012–2013: Metalist Kharkiv

Senior career*
Years	Team	Apps	(Gls)
2013–2014	Metalist Kharkiv	0	(0)
2015–2016	Aves	1	(0)
2016–2017	Fafe	29	(2)
2017	Real SC	8	(0)
2018–2019	Zorya Luhansk	13	(0)
2020	Olimpik Donetsk	5	(0)
2021	Akron Tolyatti	14	(0)
2021–2022	SKA-Khabarovsk	18	(0)
2022	KÍ Klaksvík	6	(1)
2022–2024	Lusitânia	48	(0)
2024–2025	Sabail	33	(2)
2025–	Kuala Lumpur City	0	(0)

International career^{‡}
2017	Ukraine U21	1	(0)
- * Club domestic league appearances and goals as of 26 July 2025 ‡ National team caps and goals as of 9 January 2021

Dmytro Andriyovych Lytvyn (Ukrainian: Дмитро Андрійович Литвин; born 21 November 1996) is a Ukrainian professional footballer who plays as a defender for Malaysia Super League club Kuala Lumpur City.

== Career ==
Lytvyn is a product of Dynamo Kyiv, Arsenal Kyiv and Metalist Kharkiv youth sportive school systems and spent some years in the Ukrainian Premier League Reserves. In July 2015 he signed a two-year contract with Portuguese club Aves.
