= Mohamed El Bouazzati =

German-Moroccan footballer

Personal information
- Date of birth: 9 January 1997 (age 29)
- Place of birth: Nador, Morocco
- Height: 1.87 m (6 ft 2 in)
- Position: Centre-back

Team information
- Current team: FC Roj Dortmund
- Number: 4

Youth career
- 2003–2006: Hörder SC
- 2006–2016: Borussia Dortmund

Senior career*
Years	Team	Apps	(Gls)
2014–2017	Borussia Dortmund II	4	(0)
2016–2017	→ VfL Osnabrück (loan)	12	(0)
2018	Zorya Luhansk	2	(0)
2019	Wattenscheid 09	1	(0)
2019–2020	Türkspor Augsburg	1	(0)
2020	TuS Bövinghausen	1	(0)
2020–2021	Rot Weiss Ahlen	14	(0)
2021–2022	SV Lippstadt	8	(0)
2022	SC Westfalia Herne	0	(0)
2022–	FC Roj Dortmund	11	(1)

International career
2013	Morocco U17	5	(1)
2015	Morocco U20	1	(0)
- * Club domestic league appearances and goals as of 22:59, 13 March 2023 (UTC)

Mohamed El Bouazzati (Arabic: محمد البوعزاتي; born 9 January 1997) is a German-Moroccan footballer who plays for Bezirksliga club FC Roj Dortmund. He plays as a center back.

== Club career ==
Born in Nador, Morocco and having grown up in Dortmund, El Bouazzati played for Borussia Dortmund in his youth. He made his professional debut for Borussia Dortmund II in the 3. Liga on 22 August 2014 against SG Sonnenhof Großaspach, replacing Nico Knystock after 87 minutes of a scoreless draw.

On 5 July 2022, El Bouazzati joined Bezirksliga club FC Roj Dortmund.

== International career ==
El Bouazzati has represented the Morocco national football team at international level, making two appearances for their under-17 team in October 2013.
