= Luiz Felipe (footballer, born April 1997) =

Brazilian footballer

Personal information
- Full name: Luiz Felipe da Silva Nunes
- Date of birth: 24 April 1997 (age 29)
- Place of birth: Rio Grande, Rio Grande do Sul, Brazil
- Height: 1.97 m (6 ft 5 1/2 in)
- Position: Goalkeeper

Team information
- Current team: Farense
- Number: 1

Youth career
- 201?–2017: Internacional

Senior career*
Years	Team	Apps	(Gls)
2017	Internacional	0	(0)
2018–2019	Zorya Luhansk	12	(0)
2020	Aimoré	8	(0)
2021	Coimbra Sports	3	(0)
2021–2022	B-SAD	32	(0)
2022–2023	Vizela	1	(0)
2023–	Farense	0	(0)
- * Club domestic league appearances and goals as of 13 June 2023

Luiz Felipe da Silva Nunes (born 24 April 1997), commonly known as Luiz Felipe, is a Brazilian footballer who plays as a goalkeeper for Primeira Liga club Farense.

== Career ==
Luiz Felipe is a product of Sport Club Internacional youth sportive system.

In February 2018 he signed a three-year deal with the Ukrainian Premier League's FC Zorya Luhansk. He made a debut for the main-squad time in a match against S.C. Braga in the UEFA Europa League on 9 August 2018. And in the Ukrainian Premier League on 30 September 2018 in the match against FC Lviv.

In January 2020 Luiz Felipe signed for Campeonato Gaúcho club Aimoré.
