= Tymofiy Sukhar =

Ukrainian footballer

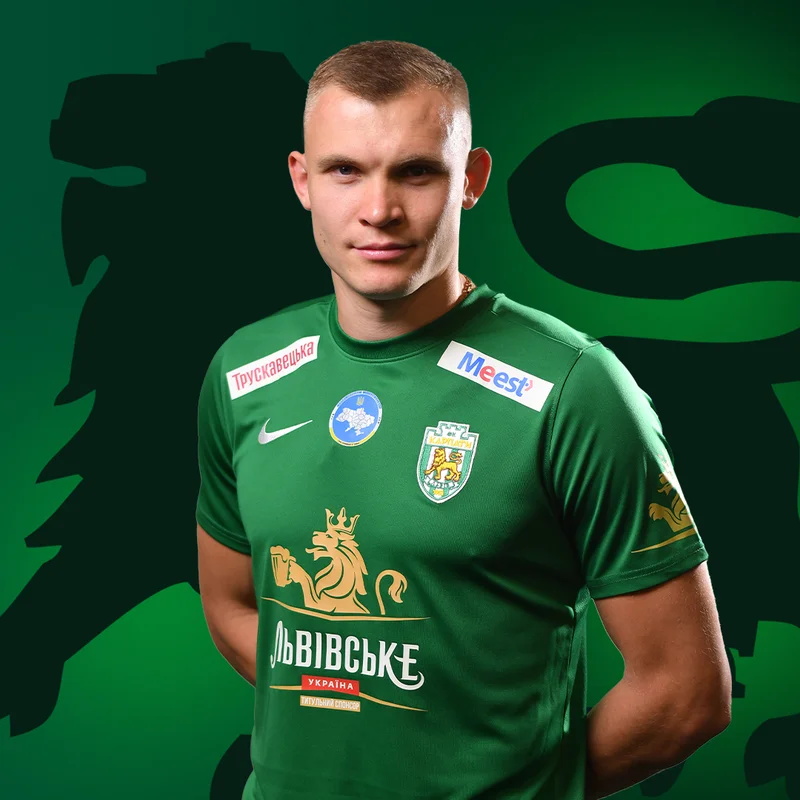

Personal information
- Full name: Tymofiy Yuriyovych Sukhar
- Date of birth: 4 February 1999 (age 27)
- Place of birth: Velyka Lepetykha, Ukraine
- Height: 1.80 m (5 ft 11 in)
- Position: Defender

Youth career
- 2011–2014: UFK Dnipropetrovsk
- 2014–2015: Dnipro Dnipropetrovsk

Senior career*
Years	Team	Apps	(Gls)
2015–2017	Dnipro	0	(0)
2017	Dnipro-1	12	(1)
2018–2022	Zorya Luhansk	0	(0)
2020	→ Metalurh Zaporizhzhia (loan)	8	(0)
2021	→ VPK-Ahro Shevchenkivka (loan)	17	(0)
2022	Petržalka	4	(0)
2022–2023	Skoruk Tomakivka	14	(0)
2023–2025	Karpaty Lviv	17	(1)
2025	Kolos Kovalivka	2	(0)
2025	Chornomorets Odesa	9	(0)

International career^{‡}
2014–2015	Ukraine U16	7	(0)
2015–2016	Ukraine U17	13	(1)
2016–2017	Ukraine U18	5	(0)
2017–	Ukraine U19	1	(0)
- * Club domestic league appearances and goals as of 6 February 2026 ‡ National team caps and goals as of 17 February 2018

Tymofiy Yuriyovych Sukhar (Ukrainian: Тимофій Юрійович Сухар; born 4 February 1999) is a Ukrainian professional footballer who plays as a defender.

== Career ==
Sukhar is a product of the UFK Dnipropetrovsk and FC Dnipro Youth Sportive School systems. His first trainers were Volodymyr Herashchenko and Kostyantyn Pavlyuchenko.

He never made his debut for FC Dnipro in the Ukrainian Premier League and in summer 2017 signed a contract with the new created Ukrainian Second League's club SC Dnipro-1.

In February 2018 he joined Ukrainian Premier League side Zorya Luhansk and signed 3-year contract with the club.

=== Chornomorets Odesa ===
On 8 July 2025, Sukhar joined Chornomorets Odesa. On 2 August 2025 in the 1st round match of Ukrainian First League between FC Chornomorets and Nyva Ternopil Sukhar made his official debut as player of Chornomorets. On 6 February 2026, Sukhar left the club.

== Personal life ==
His father Yuriy Sukhar was also a footballer, who played in the amateur level.
