= Iury Castilho =

Brazilian footballer (born 1995)

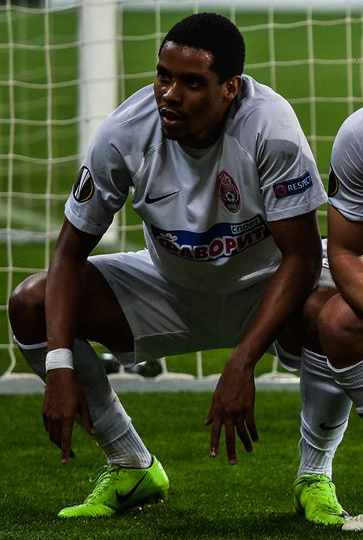

Personal information
- Full name: Iury Lírio Freitas de Castilho
- Date of birth: 6 September 1995 (age 31)
- Place of birth: Rio de Janeiro, Brazil
- Height: 1.85 m (6 ft 1 in)
- Position: Striker

Team information
- Current team: Albirex Niigata (on loan from Coritiba)
- Number: 9

Youth career
- Madureira
- Tigres do Brasil
- 2012–2014: Avaí

Senior career*
Years	Team	Apps	(Gls)
2014–2017	Avaí	26	(3)
2017–2018	Zorya Luhansk	25	(11)
2018–2019	Al-Nasr	2	(1)
2019	→ Al-Fayha (loan)	4	(0)
2019–2022	Portimonense	7	(1)
2020	→ Renofa Yamaguchi (loan)	31	(9)
2021	→ CSA (loan)	35	(11)
2022	→ Ceará (loan)	13	(0)
2023	Cuiabá	21	(3)
2023–2024	Vitória	20	(5)
2024–2025	Mirassol	40	(10)
2025–	Coritiba	27	(4)
2026	→ Sport Recife (loan)	16	(5)
2026–	→ Albirex Niigata (loan)	1	(0)
- * Club domestic league appearances and goals as of 6 September 2026

Iury Lírio Freitas de Castilho (born 6 September 1995), known professionally as Iury Castilho, is a Brazilian professional footballer who plays as a striker for Albirex Niigata, on loan from Coritiba.

== Career ==
Iury Castilho is a product of Madureira, Tigres do Brasil and Avaí youth academies. He was brought up to Avai's first team in 2014 and made his professional debut with the club in February 2015 in the Campeonato Brasileiro Série A. He scored his first goal for the club in the Campeonato Catarinense against Metropolitano on 19 February 2015. He stayed with the club for three years, leaving in 2017.

In July 2017 he signed a contract with the Ukrainian Premier League's Zorya Luhansk. In February 2018, Iury Castilho scored a spectacular bicycle kick in his team's 3–0 win over Vorskla Poltava, and celebrated by mockingly mimicking a monkey in response to "monkey chants" from some racist fans in the crowd.

On 7 June 2018, he moved to UAE Pro-League club Al-Nasr Dubai SC. He was loaned out to Al-Fayha six months later on 18 January 2019. At the end of the loan, he signed for Portimonense of the Portuguese Primeira Liga on a three-year contract in June 2019.

== Career statistics ==
As of match played 7 September 2024

Appearances and goals by club, season and competition
Club	Season	League			State League		National cup		Continental		Other		Total	
Club	Season	Division	Apps	Goals	Apps	Goals	Apps	Goals	Apps	Goals	Apps	Goals	Apps	Goals
Avaí	2014	Série B	—		1 (Note: Appearance(s) in Campeonato Catarinense)	0	—		—		—		1	0
Avaí	2015	Série A	1	0	3	1	0	0	—		—		4	1
Avaí	2016	Série B	3	0	14	2	3	0	—		2 (Note: Appearance(s) in Primeira Liga)	0	22	2
Avaí	2017	Série A	1	0	3	0	—		—		1	0	5	0
Avaí	Total		5	0	21	3	3	0	—		3	0	32	3
Zorya Luhansk	2017–18	Ukrainian Premier League	25	11	—		—		5 (Note: Appearance(s) in UEFA Europa League)	0	—		30	11
Al-Nasr	2018–19	UAE Pro League	2	1	—		—		—		2 (Note: Appearance(s) in UAE League Cup)	1	4	2
Al-Fayha (loan)	2018–19	Saudi Pro League	4	0	—		1	0	—		—		5	0
Portimonense	2019–20	Primeira Liga	7	1	—		—		—		4 (Note: Appearance(s) in Taça da Liga)	0	11	1
Renofa Yamaguchi (loan)	2020	J2 League	31	9	—		—		—		—		31	9
CSA (loan)	2021	Série B	28	10	7 (Note: Appearance(s) in Campeonato Alagoano)	1	2	0	—		8 (Note: Appearance(s) in Copa do Nordeste)	0	45	11
Ceará (loan)	2022	Série A	13	0	—		3	0	7 (Note: Appearance(s) in Copa Sudamericana)	0	6	0	29	0
Cuiabá	2023	Série A	10	0	—		1	0	—		2 (Note: Appearance(s) in Copa Verde)	0	13	0
Vitória	2023	Série B	15	3	—		—		—		—		15	3
Vitória	2024	Série B	5	1	10 (Note: Appearance(s) in Campeonato Baiano)	3	1	0	—		3	1	19	5
Vitória	Total		20	4	10	3	1	0	—		3	1	34	8
Mirassol	2024	Série B	5	1	—		—		—		—		5	1
Career total			150	37	38	7	11	0	12	0	28	2	239	46

== Honours ==
CSA

- Campeonato Alagoano: 2021

Cuiabá

- Campeonato Mato-Grossense: 2023
