= 2015 Santos FC season =

Brazilian football club 2015 season

Santos
2015 season
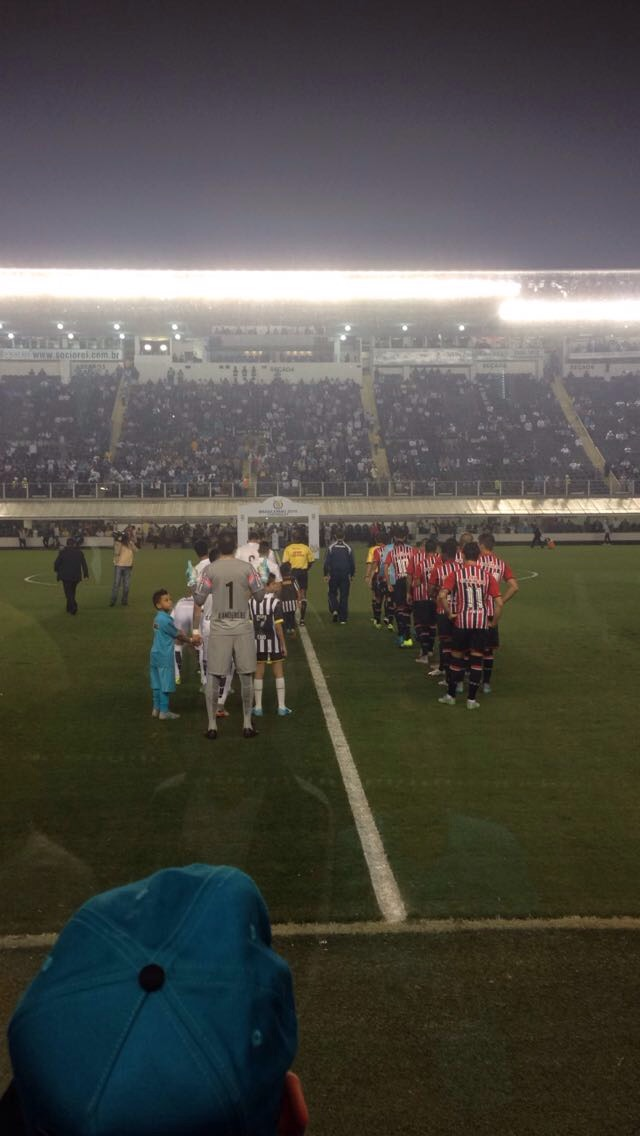
- Santos vs São Paulo at the Vila Belmiro on 9 September
- President: Modesto Roma Júnior
- Coach: Dorival Júnior
- Stadium: Vila Belmiro
- Campeonato Brasileiro: 7th
- Campeonato Paulista: Winners
- Copa do Brasil: Runners-up
- Top goalscorer: League: Ricardo Oliveira (20); All: Ricardo Oliveira (37)
- Highest home attendance: 25,939 vs Figueirense (1 October)
- Lowest home attendance: 3,836 vs Atlético Paranaense (6 December)
Home colours	Away colours	Third colours

The 2015 season is Santos Futebol Clube's 103rd season in existence and the club's fifty-sixth consecutive season in the top flight of Brazilian football. As well as the Campeonato Brasileiro, the club competes in the Copa do Brasil and the Campeonato Paulista.

On 13 December 2014, Modesto Roma Júnior was elected the new president, after winning by 1,329 votes. On 5 March 2015 manager Enderson Moreira was sacked, and the assistant Marcelo Fernandes was appointed as interim; the latter was definitely appointed as manager seven days later.

On 3 May 2015, Santos was crowned champions of Campeonato Paulista after a three-year absence, after defeating Palmeiras by 2–1 in the finals (2–2 aggregate score, 4–2 on penalties). On 9 July, with the team in the relegation zone, Fernandes was replaced by Dorival Júnior, who returned to the club after nearly five years.

In October, Santos entered in Campeonato Brasileiro's G-4 after a five-year "drought" (precisely 187 rounds). The club also reached the year's Copa do Brasil finals, again facing Palmeiras in a two-legged tie; it was also the first final of the tournament disputed by two clubs from the São Paulo state.

== Players ==
=== Squad information ===
As of 7 December 2015

No.	Name	Pos.	Nat.	Place of Birth	Date of Birth (Age)	Club caps	Club goals	Int. caps	Int. goals	Signed from	Date signed	Fee	Contract End
Goalkeepers
1	Vanderlei	GK	(Brazil)	Porecatu (Paraná (state))	1 February 1984 (aged 31)	48	0	–	–	Coritiba	23 January 2015	Undisc.	31 December 2017
12	Vladimir	GK	(Brazil)	Ipiaú (Bahia)	16 July 1989 (aged 26)	43	0	–	–	Youth System	1 January 2009	Free	31 December 2016
33	Gabriel Gasparotto	GK	(Brazil)	Lucélia (São Paulo (state))	9 December 1993 (aged 21)	0	0	–	–	Youth System	9 February 2013	Free	31 December 2016
36	João Paulo	GK	(Brazil)	Dourados (Mato Grosso do Sul)	29 June 1995 (aged 20)	0	0	–	–	Youth System	26 February 2014	Free	31 December 2018
Defenders
2	Werley	CB	(Brazil)	Oliveira (Minas Gerais)	5 September 1988 (aged 27)	44	3	–	–	Grêmio	18 January 2015	Loan	31 December 2015
3	Caju	LB	(Brazil)	Irecê (Bahia)	17 July 1995 (aged 20)	18	0	–	–	Youth System	21 September 2014	Free	31 December 2019
4	Victor Ferraz	RB	(Brazil)	João Pessoa (Paraíba)	14 January 1988 (aged 27)	62	1	–	–	Coritiba	18 June 2014	Free	31 December 2019
6	Gustavo Henrique	CB	(Brazil)	São Paulo (São Paulo (state))	24 March 1993 (aged 22)	75	3	–	–	Youth System	10 January 2013	Free	31 December 2016
14	David Braz	CB	(Brazil)	Guarulhos (São Paulo (state))	21 May 1987 (aged 28)	108	11	–	–	Flamengo	15 May 2012	Free	31 August 2019
23	Chiquinho	LB/CM/AM	(Brazil)	Caxias (Maranhão)	27 July 1989 (aged 26)	24	1	–	–	Fluminense	9 January 2015	Free	31 December 2015
32	Paulo Ricardo	CB	(Brazil)	Laguna (Santa Catarina (state))	13 June 1994 (aged 21)	20	0	–	–	Youth System	25 January 2014	Free	31 December 2017
37	Zeca	LB	(Brazil)	Paranavaí (Paraná (state))	16 May 1994 (aged 21)	53	0	–	–	Youth System	25 January 2014	Free	31 December 2018
38	Daniel Guedes	RB	(Brazil)	João Ramalho (São Paulo (state))	2 April 1994 (aged 21)	23	0	–	–	Youth System	19 February 2014	Free	17 February 2019
44	Leonardo	CB	(Brazil)	Guarulhos (São Paulo (state))	9 March 1986 (aged 29)	38	0	–	–	Ituano	15 May 2015	Free	31 December 2016
Midfielders
5	Alison	DM	(Brazil)	Cubatão (São Paulo (state))	1 March 1993 (aged 22)	76	1	–	–	Youth System	9 September 2011	Free	31 December 2017
8	Renato	DM	(Brazil)	Santa Mercedes (São Paulo (state))	15 May 1979 (aged 36)	292	28	28	0	Botafogo	9 January 2015	Free	31 December 2016
15	Edwin Valencia	DM/CM	(Colombia)	Florida	29 March 1985 (aged 30)	16	0	18	0	Fluminense	15 January 2015	Free	31 December 2015
16	Fernando Medeiros	DM	(Brazil)	Santos (São Paulo (state))	10 February 1996 (aged 19)	1	0	–	–	Youth System	29 September 2015	Free	31 December 2018
17	Rafael Longuine	AM	(Brazil)	Paranavaí (Paraná (state))	30 May 1990 (aged 25)	14	2	–	–	Audax	14 April 2015	Free	31 May 2017
18	Vitor Bueno	AM	(Brazil)	Monte Alto (São Paulo (state))	5 September 1994 (aged 21)	4	1	–	–	Botafogo-SP	26 May 2015	Loan	1 June 2016
19	Marquinhos	AM/LB	(Brazil)	Vassouras (Rio de Janeiro (state))	15 June 1989 (aged 26)	7	0	–	–	Audax	19 May 2015	Loan	31 December 2015
20	Lucas Lima	AM	(Brazil)	Marília (São Paulo (state))	9 July 1990 (aged 25)	109	11	6	1	Internacional	7 February 2014	R$ 5M	31 December 2017
21	Leandrinho	CM/AM	(Brazil)	Espinosa (Minas Gerais)	25 September 1993 (aged 22)	62	1	–	–	Youth System	5 March 2013	Free	31 December 2017
24	Cristian Ledesma	CM/DM	(Italy)	Morón (Argentina)	24 September 1982 (aged 33)	4	0	1	0	Lazio (Italy)	3 September 2015	Free	10 March 2016
25	Lucas Otávio	DM	(Brazil)	Bandeirantes (Paraná (state))	9 October 1994 (aged 21)	30	0	–	–	Youth System	22 July 2013	Free	31 January 2019
27	Léo Cittadini	AM	(Brazil)	Rio Claro (São Paulo (state))	27 February 1994 (aged 21)	14	1	–	–	Youth System	3 June 2013	Free	31 December 2018
29	Thiago Maia	CM	(Brazil)	Boa Vista (Roraima)	13 March 1997 (aged 18)	38	2	–	–	Youth System	20 October 2014	Free	30 June 2019
31	Marquinhos Gabriel	AM/SS	(Brazil)	Selbach (Rio Grande do Sul)	21 July 1990 (aged 25)	44	9	–	–	Al-Nassr (Saudi Arabia)	16 January 2015	Loan	31 December 2015
41	Serginho	AM	(Brazil)	Monte Aprazível (São Paulo (state))	15 March 1995 (aged 20)	22	0	–	–	Youth System	25 January 2014	Free	31 December 2016
Forwards
7	Leandro	SS	(Brazil)	Brasília (Federal District (Brazil))	12 May 1993 (aged 22)	14	1	–	–	Palmeiras	3 August 2015	Loan	31 December 2015
9	Ricardo Oliveira	ST	(Brazil)	São Paulo (São Paulo (state))	6 May 1980 (aged 35)	94	58	14	4	Free agent	12 January 2015	Free	31 December 2017
10	Gabriel	SS/ST	(Brazil)	São Bernardo (São Paulo (state))	30 August 1996 (aged 19)	127	44	–	–	Youth System	24 May 2013	Free	30 September 2019
11	Geuvânio	SS	(Brazil)	Ilha das Flores (Sergipe)	5 April 1992 (aged 23)	114	24	–	–	Youth System	6 June 2012	Free	31 December 2017
39	Nilson	ST	(Brazil)	São Paulo (São Paulo (state))	6 April 1991 (aged 24)	16	1	–	–	Cianorte	19 May 2015	Loan	31 December 2015
40	Neto Berola	SS	(Brazil)	Itabuna (Bahia)	18 November 1987 (aged 28)	23	2	–	–	Atlético Mineiro	19 May 2015	Loan	31 May 2016

Source: SantosFC.com.br (for appearances and goals), Wikipedia players' articles (for international appearances and goals), FPF (for contracts)

==== Youth players ====
Note: Flags indicate national team as defined under FIFA eligibility rules; some limited exceptions apply. Players may hold more than one non-FIFA nationality.

No.	Pos.	Nation	Player
28	DF	BRA	Lucas Veríssimo
30	FW	BRA	Wesley

=== Appearances and goals ===
No.	Pos.	Nat	Name	Campeonato Brasileiro		Campeonato Paulista		Copa do Brasil		Total	
No.	Pos.	Nat	Name	Apps	Goals	Apps	Goals	Apps	Goals	Apps	Goals
1	GK	(Brazil)	Vanderlei	27+1	0	10	0	10	0	48	0
12	GK	(Brazil)	Vladimir	11	0	9+1	0	4	0	25	0
33	GK	(Brazil)	Gabriel Gasparotto	0	0	0	0	0	0	0	0
3	DF	(Brazil)	Caju	1+3	0	0	0	1	0	5	0
23	DF	(Brazil)	Chiquinho	8+2	0	11	1	1+2	0	24	1
38	DF	(Brazil)	Daniel Guedes	16+2	0	0	0	3	0	21	0
4	DF	(Brazil)	Victor Ferraz	29	1	18+1	0	9	0	57	1
37	DF	(Brazil)	Zeca	22	0	2+1	0	10	0	35	0
14	DF	(Brazil)	David Braz	29	2	17	3	12	0	58	5
6	DF	(Brazil)	Gustavo Henrique	19+1	0	6+1	0	9+1	0	37	0
44	DF	(Brazil)	Leonardo	1+2	0	0	0	0	0	3	0
32	DF	(Brazil)	Paulo Ricardo	9+2	0	1	0	2+4	0	18	0
2	DF	(Brazil)	Werley	22+1	2	14	1	6+1	0	44	3
5	MF	(Brazil)	Alison	1+2	0	4	0	0+1	0	8	0
16	MF	(Brazil)	Fernando Medeiros	0+1	0	0	0	0	0	1	0
21	MF	(Brazil)	Leandrinho	4+2	0	3+3	0	2+2	0	16	0
24	MF	(Italy)	Ledesma	3+1	0	0	0	0	0	4	0
27	MF	(Brazil)	Léo Cittadini	1+5	0	0	0	0	0	6	0
20	MF	(Brazil)	Lucas Lima	31	4	17+1	1	11	1	60	6
25	MF	(Brazil)	Lucas Otávio	10+4	0	5+6	0	2	0	27	0
19	MF	(Brazil)	Marquinhos	1+4	0	0	0	0+2	0	7	0
31	MF	(Brazil)	Marquinhos Gabriel	17+9	3	2+5	1	9+2	5	44	9
17	MF	(Brazil)	Rafael Longuine	6+6	2	0	0	1+1	0	14	2
8	MF	(Brazil)	Renato	25	0	16+1	2	11	0	53	2
41	MF	(Brazil)	Serginho	2+8	0	0	0	0+3	0	13	0
29	MF	(Brazil)	Thiago Maia	23+5	2	0	0	8+1	0	37	2
15	MF	(Colombia)	Valencia	2	0	10	0	4	0	16	0
18	MF	(Brazil)	Vitor Bueno	0+4	1	0	0	0	0	4	1
10	FW	(Brazil)	Gabriel	27+3	10	5+7	3	11+3	8	56	21
11	FW	(Brazil)	Geuvânio	25+3	6	16+1	3	6+4	1	55	10
7	FW	(Brazil)	Leandro	2+12	1	0	0	0	0	14	1
40	FW	(Brazil)	Neto Berola	2+17	1	0	0	0+4	1	23	2
39	FW	(Brazil)	Nilson	5+8	1	0	0	0+3	0	16	1
9	FW	(Brazil)	Ricardo Oliveira	31+1	20	16+2	11	12	6	62	37
Players who left the club during the season
4	DF	(Brazil)	Cicinho	0+1	0	8+4	1	4	0	17	1
36	DF	(Brazil)	Jubal	0	0	0+1	0	0	0	1	0
22	MF	(Brazil)	Elano	2+3	0	2+12	0	2+3	2	24	2
30	FW	(Brazil)	Diego Cardoso	0	0	0	0	0+1	0	1	0
49	FW	(Brazil)	Lucas Crispim	0	0	0+5	0	1+1	0	7	0
7	FW	(Brazil)	Robinho	4	2	13	5	3	1	20	8
11	FW	(Brazil)	Thiago Ribeiro	0	0	4+5	2	0+1	0	10	2

Last updated: 7 December 2015
Source: Match reports in Competitive matches, Soccerway, Campeonato Brasileiro, Campeonato Paulista, Copa do Brasil

=== Goalscorers ===
Ran	No.	Pos	Nat	Name	Brasileirão	Paulistão	Copa do Brasil	Total
1	9	FW	(Brazil)	Ricardo Oliveira	20	11	6	37
2	10	FW	(Brazil)	Gabriel	10	3	8	21
3	11	FW	(Brazil)	Geuvânio	6	3	1	10
4	31	MF	(Brazil)	Marquinhos Gabriel	3	1	5	9
5	7	FW	(Brazil)	Robinho	2	5	1	8
6	20	MF	(Brazil)	Lucas Lima	4	1	1	6
7	14	DF	(Brazil)	David Braz	2	3	0	5
8	2	DF	(Brazil)	Werley	2	1	0	3
8	Own goals				1	2	0	3
9	8	MF	(Brazil)	Renato	0	2	0	2
9	11	FW	(Brazil)	Thiago Ribeiro	0	2	0	2
9	22	MF	(Brazil)	Elano	0	0	2	2
9	17	MF	(Brazil)	Rafael Longuine	2	0	0	2
9	40	FW	(Brazil)	Neto Berola	1	0	1	2
9	29	MF	(Brazil)	Thiago Maia	2	0	0	2
10	23	DF	(Brazil)	Chiquinho	0	1	0	1
10	4	DF	(Brazil)	Cicinho	0	1	0	1
10	4	DF	(Brazil)	Victor Ferraz	1	0	0	1
10	39	FW	(Brazil)	Nilson	1	0	0	1
10	7	FW	(Brazil)	Leandro	1	0	0	1
10	18	MF	(Brazil)	Vitor Bueno	1	0	0	1
Total					59	36	25	120

Last updated: 7 December 2015
Source: Match reports in Competitive matches

=== Disciplinary record ===
N	Nat	Pos	Name	Brasileirão			Copa do Brasil			Paulista			Total		
N	Nat	Pos	Name	Yellow card	(yellow card) (yellow-red card)	Red card	Yellow card	(yellow card) (yellow-red card)	Red card	Yellow card	(yellow card) (yellow-red card)	Red card	Yellow card	(yellow card) (yellow-red card)	Red card
20	(Brazil)	MF	Lucas Lima	6	0	0	5	0	0	5	0	0	16	0	0
14	(Brazil)	DF	David Braz	7	1	1	0	0	0	5	0	0	12	1	1
9	(Brazil)	FW	Ricardo Oliveira	6	0	0	4	0	0	1	0	0	11	0	0
2	(Brazil)	DF	Werley	7	1	0	2	0	0	0	0	0	9	1	0
10	(Brazil)	FW	Gabriel	4	0	1	4	0	0	1	0	0	9	0	1
4	(Brazil)	DF	Cicinho	1	0	0	2	0	0	5	2	0	8	2	0
15	(Colombia)	MF	Valencia	0	0	0	2	0	0	6	1	0	8	1	0
11	(Brazil)	FW	Geuvânio	4	1	0	0	0	0	3	0	1	7	1	1
6	(Brazil)	DF	Gustavo Henrique	5	1	0	1	0	0	1	0	0	7	1	0
38	(Brazil)	DF	Daniel Guedes	4	0	0	0	0	0	0	0	0	7	0	0
40	(Brazil)	FW	Neto Berola	6	0	0	0	0	0	0	0	0	6	0	0
7	(Brazil)	FW	Robinho	1	0	0	1	0	0	3	0	0	5	0	0
29	(Brazil)	MF	Thiago Maia	5	0	0	0	0	0	0	0	0	5	0	0
4	(Brazil)	DF	Victor Ferraz	1	0	0	3	0	0	1	0	0	5	0	0
32	(Brazil)	DF	Paulo Ricardo	3	0	0	1	0	0	0	0	1	4	0	1
1	(Brazil)	GK	Vanderlei	3	0	0	1	0	0	1	0	0	5	0	0
25	(Brazil)	MF	Lucas Otávio	3	0	0	0	0	0	1	0	0	4	0	0
22	(Brazil)	MF	Elano	0	0	0	2	0	0	2	0	0	4	0	0
31	(Brazil)	MF	Marquinhos Gabriel	2	0	1	1	0	0	0	0	0	3	0	1
21	(Brazil)	MF	Leandrinho	0	0	0	1	0	0	2	0	0	3	0	0
23	(Brazil)	DF	Chiquinho	2	0	0	0	0	0	1	0	0	3	0	0
37	(Brazil)	DF	Zeca	3	0	0	0	0	0	0	0	0	3	0	0
12	(Brazil)	GK	Vladimir	2	0	1	0	0	0	0	0	0	2	0	1
5	(Brazil)	MF	Alison	0	0	0	0	0	0	2	0	0	2	0	0
24	(Italy)	MF	Ledesma	2	0	0	0	0	0	0	0	0	2	0	0
8	(Brazil)	MF	Renato	0	0	0	1	0	0	1	0	0	2	0	0
17	(Brazil)	MF	Rafael Longuine	1	1	0	0	0	0	0	0	0	1	1	0
11	(Brazil)	FW	Thiago Ribeiro	0	0	0	0	0	0	1	0	0	1	0	0
3	(Brazil)	DF	Caju	1	0	0	0	0	0	0	0	0	1	0	0
27	(Brazil)	MF	Léo Cittadini	1	0	0	0	0	0	0	0	0	1	0	0
TOTALS				80	7	4	30	0	0	42	3	2	152	10	6

As of 4 December 2015
Source: Campeonato Brasileiro, Campeonato Paulista, Copa do Brasil (yellow card) = Number of bookings; (yellow card) (yellow-red card) = Number of sending offs after a second yellow card; (red card) = Number of sending offs by a direct red card.

=== National team call-ups ===
N	Nat	Pos	Player	National team	Competition	Date
3	(Brazil)	DF	Caju	Brazil U20	South American Youth Championship	14 January to 7 February
10	(Brazil)	FW	Gabriel	Brazil U20	South American Youth Championship	14 January to 7 February
29	(Brazil)	MF	Thiago Maia	Brazil U20	South American Youth Championship	14 January to 7 February
7	(Brazil)	FW	Robinho	Brazil	Friendlies against France and Chile	26 and 29 March
3	(Brazil)	DF	Caju	Brazil U20	FIFA U-20 World Cup	30 May to 20 June
7	(Brazil)	FW	Robinho	Brazil	Copa América	11 June to 4 July
15	(Colombia)	MF	Valencia	Colombia	Copa América	11 June to 4 July
6	(Brazil)	DF	Gustavo Henrique	Brazil U23	Pan American Games	10 July to 26 July
20	(Brazil)	MF	Lucas Lima	Brazil	Friendlies against Costa Rica and USA	5 to 8 September
20	(Brazil)	MF	Lucas Lima	Brazil	WC Qualifying against Chile and Venezuela	5 to 13 October
9	(Brazil)	FW	Ricardo Oliveira	Brazil	WC Qualifying against Chile and Venezuela	5 to 13 October
10	(Brazil)	FW	Gabriel	Brazil U23	Friendlies against Dominican Republic U23 and Haiti U23	9 to 12 October
20	(Brazil)	MF	Lucas Lima	Brazil	WC Qualifying against Argentina and Peru	12 to 17 November
9	(Brazil)	FW	Ricardo Oliveira	Brazil	WC Qualifying against Argentina and Peru|	12 to 17 November
10	(Brazil)	FW	Gabriel	Brazil U23	Friendlies against USA U23	11 to 15 November
37	(Brazil)	DF	Zeca	Brazil U23	Friendlies against USA U23	11 to 15 November

=== Suspensions served ===
Date	Matches Missed	Player	Reason	Opponents Missed	Competition
8 February	1	Cicinho	(yellow card) (yellow-red card) vs Red Bull Brasil	São Paulo (H)	Campeonato Paulista
1 March	1	Robinho	3x (yellow card)	Botafogo (A)	Campeonato Paulista
1 March	1	David Braz	3x (yellow card)	Botafogo (A)	Campeonato Paulista
14 March	1	Valencia	3x (yellow card)	Grêmio Audax (H)	Campeonato Paulista
26 March	1	Cicinho	(yellow card) (yellow-red card) vs Ponte Preta	São Bento (H)	Campeonato Paulista
26 March	1	Valencia	(yellow card) (yellow-red card) vs Ponte Preta	São Bento (H)	Campeonato Paulista
5 April	1	Lucas Lima	3x (yellow card)	Rio Claro (H)	Campeonato Paulista
5 April	1	Geuvânio	3x (yellow card)	Rio Claro (H)	Campeonato Paulista
5 April	1	Cicinho	3x (yellow card)	Rio Claro (H)	Campeonato Paulista
26 April	1	Paulo Ricardo	(red card) vs Palmeiras	Palmeiras (H)	Campeonato Paulista
10 May	1	Gustavo Henrique	(yellow card) (yellow-red card) vs Avaí	Cruzeiro (H)	Campeonato Brasileiro
20 May	1	Lucas Lima	3x (yellow card)	Sport (H)	Copa do Brasil
3 June	1	Marquinhos Gabriel	(red card) vs São Paulo	Ponte Preta (H)	Campeonato Brasileiro
10 June	1	Lucas Lima	3x (yellow card)	Corinthians (H)	Campeonato Brasileiro
20 June	1	Rafael Longuine	(yellow card) (yellow-red card) vs Corinthians	Internacional (A)	Campeonato Brasileiro
28 June	1	Lucas Otávio	3x (yellow card)	Fluminense (A)	Campeonato Brasileiro
28 June	1	David Braz	(yellow card) (yellow-red card) vs Internacional	Fluminense (A)	Campeonato Brasileiro
2 July	1	Werley	3x (yellow card)	Grêmio (H)	Campeonato Brasileiro
2 July	1	Daniel Guedes	3x (yellow card)	Grêmio (H)	Campeonato Brasileiro
5 July	1	Geuvânio	(yellow card) (yellow-red card) vs Grêmio	Goiás (A)	Campeonato Brasileiro
19 July	1	Ricardo Oliveira	3x (yellow card)	Joinville (H)	Campeonato Brasileiro
19 July	1	Neto Berola	3x (yellow card)	Joinville (H)	Campeonato Brasileiro
26 July	1	David Braz	3x (yellow card)	Flamengo (A)	Campeonato Brasileiro
2 August	1	Werley	3x (yellow card)	Coritiba (H)	Campeonato Brasileiro
22 August	1	Geuvânio	3x (yellow card)	Cruzeiro (A)	Campeonato Brasileiro
9 September	1	Thiago Maia	3x (yellow card)	Ponte Preta (A)	Campeonato Brasileiro
20 September	1	Ricardo Oliveira	3x (yellow card)	SC Internacional (H)	Campeonato Brasileiro
20 September	2	Werley	(yellow card) (yellow-red card) vs Corinthians	SC Internacional (H); Palmeiras (H)	Campeonato Brasileiro
20 September	1	David Braz	(red card) vs Corinthians	SC Internacional (H)	Campeonato Brasileiro
4 October	1	Daniel Guedes	3x (yellow card)	Grêmio (A)	Campeonato Brasileiro
15 October	1	David Braz	3x (yellow card)	Goiás (H)	Campeonato Brasileiro
15 October	2	Gabriel	3x (yellow card) and (red card) vs Grêmio	Goiás (H); Figueirense (A)	Campeonato Brasileiro
1 November	1	Gustavo Henrique	3x (yellow card)	Joinville (A)	Campeonato Brasileiro
1 November	1	Zeca	3x (yellow card)	Joinville (A)	Campeonato Brasileiro
8 November	1	Lucas Lima	3x (yellow card)	Flamengo (H)	Campeonato Brasileiro
22 November	1	Paulo Ricardo	3x (yellow card)	Vasco da Gama (A)	Campeonato Brasileiro
22 November	1	Neto Berola	3x (yellow card)	Vasco da Gama (A)	Campeonato Brasileiro
22 November	1	Vladimir	(red card) vs Coritiba	Vasco da Gama (A)	Campeonato Brasileiro
29 November	1	Vanderlei	3x (yellow card)	Atlético Paranaense (H)	Campeonato Brasileiro

=== Injuries ===
Date	Pos.	Name	Injury	Note	Recovery time
8 February 2015	FW	Thiago Ribeiro	Tendinitis	N/A	1 month
10 February 2015	DF	Caju	Pubis injury	N/A	2 months
11 February 2015	DM	Alison	Knee sprain	Match against São Paulo	8 months
22 February 2015	DM	Chiquinho	Edema in the left thigh	Match against Portuguesa	5 weeks
26 March 2015	GK	Vanderlei	Facial fracture	Match against Ponte Preta	2 months
15 April 2015	DF	Gustavo Henrique	Edema in the left thigh	Match against Londrina	16 days
19 April 2015	FW	Robinho	Edema in the left thigh	Match against São Paulo	12 days
22 April 2015	DF	Werley	Dengue fever	N/A	9 days
22 May 2015	DM	Renato	Cyst on knee	N/A	1 week
24 May 2015	DM	Valencia	Myalgia in left calf	Match against Chapecoense	1 week
6 June 2015	DM	Chiquinho	Adductor strain	Match against Ponte Preta	2 months
22 June 2015	DM	Valencia	Ligament Tear	Match by Colombia against Peru	6 months
29 July 2015	DF	Leonardo	Fractured toe	During training	2 months
3 September 2015	FW	Geuvânio	Muscle Injury	Match against Chapecoense	45 days
27 September 2015	MF	Lucas Lima	Thigh Injury	Match against Internacional	6 days
1 October 2015	DF	Victor Ferraz	Back Injury	N/A	8 weeks
2 October 2015	DF	Zeca	Hip Injury	Match against Figueirense	1 week
4 October 2015	MF	Marquinhos Gabriel	Thigh Injury	Match against Fluminense	8 days
4 October 2015	DF	Gustavo Henrique	Groin injury	Match against Fluminense	16 days
23 October 2015	MF	Thiago Maia	Thigh injury	During training	5 days
2 December 2015	DF	David Braz	Pubis injury	Match against Palmeiras	3 months

=== Squad number changes ===
Player	Position	Old n.	New n.	Prev. to wear	Notes	Source
(Brazil) Alison	DM	29	5	(Brazil) Arouca		
(Brazil) Geuvânio	SS	45	11	(Brazil) Thiago Ribeiro		
(Brazil) Victor Ferraz	RB	13	4	(Brazil) Cicinho		
(Brazil) João Paulo	GK	34	36	(Brazil) Jubal		
(Brazil) Fernando Medeiros	DM	—	16	(Brazil) Crystian		
(Brazil) Wesley	AM	—	30	(Brazil) Diego Cardoso		

== Managers ==
Name	Nat.	Place of Birth	Date of Birth (Age)	Signed from	Date signed	Role	Departure	Manner	Contract End
Enderson Moreira	(Brazil)	Belo Horizonte (Minas Gerais)	28 September 1971 (age 55)	Free agent	3 September 2014	Permanent	5 March 2015	Resigned	31 December 2015
Marcelo Fernandes	(Brazil)	Santos (São Paulo (state))	20 April 1971 (age 55)	Staff	12 March 2015	Permanent (Note: Initially appointed interim on 5 March, but being later definitely appointed first team manager.)	9 July 2015	Ended tenure (Note: Moved back to his previous role, as an assistant manager)	31 December 2015
Dorival Júnior	(Brazil)	Araraquara (São Paulo (state))	25 April 1962 (age 64)	Free agent	9 July 2015	Permanent			31 December 2017

== Transfers ==
=== Transfers in ===
N	Pos.	Name	Age	Moving from	Fee	Source	Notes
—	DF	(Brazil) Rafael Galhardo	23	Bahia	Free		Loan return
25	MF	(Brazil) Lucas Otávio	20	Paraná	Free		Loan return
—	DF	(Brazil) Rafael Caldeira	23	Mirassol	Free		Loan return
—	AM	(Brazil) Pedro Castro	21	Paraná	Free		Loan return
49	SS	(Brazil) Lucas Crispim	20	Vasco da Gama	Free		Loan return
9	ST	(Brazil) Ricardo Oliveira	34	Free Agent	Free		
22	CM	(Brazil) Elano	33	Free Agent	Free		
15	CM	(Colombia) Edwin Valencia	29	Fluminense	Free		
1	GK	(Brazil) Vanderlei	30	Coritiba	Undisclosed		
17	AM	(Brazil) Rafael Longuine	24	Grêmio Audax	Free		
44	CB	(Brazil) Leonardo	29	Ituano	Free		
30	LF	(Brazil) Wesley	19	Botafogo–SP	Undisclosed		Originally signed to Santos B
MAN		(Brazil) Dorival Júnior	53	Free agent	Free		
—	LB	(Brazil) Emerson Palmieri	21	Palermo (Italy)	Free		Loan return
24	CM	(Italy) Cristian Ledesma	32	Lazio (Italy)	Free		Transfer
16	DM	(Brazil) Fernando Medeiros	19	Youth system	Free		Promoted

Total spending: ▼ R$ 0,00

=== Loans in ===
N.	P	Name	Age	Loaned from	Loan expires	Source
23	CM	(Brazil) Chiquinho	25	Coimbra	December 2015	
31	AM	(Brazil) Marquinhos Gabriel	24	Al-Nassr (Saudi Arabia)	December 2015	
2	CB	(Brazil) Werley	26	Grêmio	December 2015	
19	AM	(Brazil) Marquinhos	25	Audax	December 2015	
39	FW	(Brazil) Nilson	24	Cianorte	December 2015	
40	FW	(Brazil) Neto Berola	27	Atlético Mineiro	May 2016	
7	FW	(Brazil) Leandro	22	Palmeiras	December 2015	
18	AM	(Brazil) Vitor Bueno	20	Botafogo–SP	June 2016	

=== Transfers out ===
N.	Pos.	Name	Age	Moving to	Type	Fee	Source
—	CB	(Brazil) Walace	21	Luverdense	End of contract	Free	
—	ST	(Brazil) Dimba	22	Penapolense	End of contract	Free	
18	ST	(Brazil) Giva	21	Coritiba	End of contract	Free	
35	DM	(Brazil) Souza	26	Cruzeiro	Loan return	Free	
39	SS	(Brazil) Jorge Eduardo	20	Grêmio Osasco Audax	Loan return	Free	
—	CB	(Brazil) Rafael Caldeira	23	Guarani	End of contract	Free	
—	SS	(Brazil) Tiago Alves	21	Pohang Steelers (South Korea)	End of contract	Free	
31	SS	(Brazil) Rildo	25	Ponte Preta	Loan return	Free	
44	CB	(Brazil) Bruno Uvini	23	Napoli (Italy)	Loan return	Free	
26	CB	(Brazil) Vinicius Simon	28	Vila Nova	End of contract	Free	
28	CB	(Brazil) Neto	29	Chapecoense	End of contract	Free	
40	CB	(Brazil) Nailson	20	Diadema	End of contract	Free	
33	DM	(Brazil) Alan Santos	23	Coritiba	Contract terminated	Free	
15	LB	(Chile) Eugenio Mena	26	Cruzeiro	Contract terminated	Free	
2	CB	(Brazil) Edu Dracena	33	Corinthians	Contract terminated	Free	
1	GK	(Brazil) Aranha	34	Palmeiras	Contract terminated	Free	
5	DM	(Brazil) Arouca	29	Palmeiras	Contract terminated	Free	
4	RB	(Brazil) Cicinho	26	Ludogorets (Bulgaria)	Transfer	R$ 2M	
7	SS	(Brazil) Robinho	31	Guangzhou Evergrande (China)	End of contract	Free	

Total gaining: ▲ R$ 2,000,000.00

=== Loans out ===
N.	P	Name	Age	Loaned to	Loan expires	Source
9	ST	(Brazil) Leandro Damião	25	Cruzeiro	December 2015	
—	MF	(Brazil) Pedro Castro	21	Santa Cruz	December 2015	
—	RB	(Brazil) Rafael Galhardo	23	Grêmio	December 2015	
19	ST	(Brazil) Stéfano Yuri	20	Náutico	December 2015	
17	MF	(Argentina) Patito Rodríguez	24	Johor (Malaysia)	November 2015	
11	FW	(Brazil) Thiago Ribeiro	29	Atlético Mineiro	June 2016	
36	DF	(Brazil) Jubal	21	Avaí	December 2015	
49	FW	(Brazil) Lucas Crispim	20	Joinville	December 2015	
22	MF	(Brazil) Elano	34	Chennaiyin (India)	December 2015	
–	DF	(Brazil) Emerson Palmieri	21	Roma (Italy)	July 2016	
30	FW	(Brazil) Diego Cardoso	21	Bragantino	December 2015	
16	DF	(Brazil) Crystian	23	Paraná	December 2015	

=== Contracts ===
No.	Pos.	Nat.	Name	Age	Status	Contract length	Expiry date	Source
12	GK	(Brazil)	Vladimir	25	Signed	1 year	December 2015	Globo Esporte
8	MF	(Brazil)	Renato	35	Signed	1 year	December 2015	Globo Esporte
3	DF	(Brazil)	Caju	19	Signed	5 years	December 2019	Lancenet
49	MF	(Brazil)	Lucas Crispim	20	Signed	3 years	December 2017	Globo Esporte
9	FW	(Brazil)	Ricardo Oliveira	34	Signed	3 years	December 2017	Globo Esporte
22	MF	(Brazil)	Elano	33	Signed	2 years	December 2016	Globo Esporte
14	DF	(Brazil)	David Braz	28	Signed	4 years	August 2019	ESPN Brasil
12	GK	(Brazil)	Vladimir	26	Signed	1 year	December 2016	Globo Esporte
4	DF	(Brazil)	Victor Ferraz	27	Pre-contract	4 years	December 2019	Terra
37	DF	(Brazil)	Zeca	21	Signed	4 years	December 2018	Globo Esporte
38	DF	(Brazil)	Daniel Guedes	21	Signed	5 years	February 2019	Globo Esporte
6	DF	(Brazil)	Gustavo Henrique	22	Talks	Undisclosed	Undisclosed	Globo Esporte
25	MF	(Brazil)	Lucas Otávio	20	Signed	5 years	January 2019	Santos FC
29	MF	(Brazil)	Thiago Maia	18	Signed	4 years	June 2019	Globo Esporte
36	GK	(Brazil)	João Paulo	20	Signed	4 years	June 2019	Lancenet

Last updated: 4 December 2015

== Competitions ==
=== Pre-season ===
23 January	Santos	4–0	Cotia FC	Santos
16:30	Thiago Ribeiro 45'; Lucas Crispim 60'; Elano 68'; Ricardo Oliveira 78'	Report; Report		Stadium: CT Rei Pelé; Attendance: 50

=== Overall ===
Competition	Started round	Final position / round	First match	Last match
Campeonato Brasileiro	—	7th	10 May	6 December
Copa do Brasil	First round	Runner-up	17 March	2 December
Campeonato Paulista	Group stage	Winners	1 February	3 May

Updated to match played 7 December 2015
Source: Competitions

=== Detailed overall summary ===
	Total	Home	Away
Games played	71	37	34
Games won	40	31	9
Games drawn	15	5	10
Games lost	16	1	15
Biggest win	5–1 v Atlético Paranaense	5–1 v Atlético Paranaense	4–1 v Marília
Biggest loss	1–4 v Goiás	1–3 v Grêmio	1–4 v Goiás
Clean sheets	26	17	9
Goals scored	120	84	36
Goals conceded	68	27	41
Goal difference	+52	+57	−5
Average GF per game	1.69	2.27	1.03
Average GA per game	0.96	0.73	1.21
Yellow cards (yellow card)	156	70	86
Red cards (red card)	14	4	10
Most appearances	Ricardo Oliveira (62)	Ricardo Oliveira (33)	Lucas Lima (31)
Top scorer	Ricardo Oliveira (37)	Ricardo Oliveira (23)	Ricardo Oliveira (14)
Worst discipline	David Braz (red card) (2) (yellow card) (12)	Geuvânio (red card) (2) (yellow card) (4)	David Braz (red card) (2) (yellow card) (4)
Points	135/213 (63.38%)	98/111 (88.29%)	37/102 (36.27%)
Winning rate	(56.34%)	(83.78%)	(26.47%)

Last updated: 7 December 2015
Source: Competitive matches

=== Campeonato Brasileiro ===
==== Results summary ====
Overall								Home						Away					
Pld	W	D	L	GF	GA	GD	Pts	W	D	L	GF	GA	GD	W	D	L	GF	GA	GD
38	16	10	12	59	41	+18	58	15	3	1	47	15	+32	1	7	11	12	26	−14

Last updated: 7 December 2015.
Source: Soccerway

==== Results by round ====
Round	1	2	3	4	5	6	7	8	9	10	11	12	13	14	15	16	17	18	19	20	21	22	23	24	25	26	27	28	29	30	31	32	33	34	35	36	37	38
Ground	A	H	A	H	A	H	A	H	A	A	H	A	H	A	H	A	H	H	A	H	A	H	A	H	A	H	A	H	H	A	H	A	H	A	H	A	A	H
Result	D	W	L	D	L	D	D	W	L	L	L	L	W	L	W	D	W	W	D	W	W	W	D	W	L	W	L	W	W	L	W	D	W	D	D	L	L	W
Position	11	6	10	12	14	16	17	12	14	16	17	17	17	17	15	15	14	13	12	11	9	8	8	7	8	7	8	5	4	4	4	4	4	4	5	6	7	7

Updated to match(es) played on 7 December 2015. Source: Globo Esporte
W = Win; D = Draw; L = Loss

==== League table ====
Pos	Team	Pld	W	D	L	GF	GA	GD	Pts	Qualification or relegation
5	Internacional	38	17	9	12	39	38	+1	60	2016 Copa do Brasil round of 16 (Note: Since a Brazilian team didn't win the 2015 Copa Libertadores, an additional berth to the 2016 Copa do Brasil round of 16 will be given to the best team not qualified to the 2016 Copa Libertadores, the fifth-placed Internacional.)
6	Sport Recife	38	15	14	9	53	38	+15	59	2016 Copa Sudamericana second stage (Note: Teams will enter in the 2016 Copa Sudamericana if they do not reach the 2016 Copa do Brasil round of 16. Also, the 2015 Copa Verde champion (Cuiabá) and the 2016 Copa do Nordeste champion have a guaranteed berth.)
7	Santos	38	16	10	12	59	41	+18	58	2016 Copa Sudamericana second stage
8	Cruzeiro	38	15	10	13	44	35	+9	55	2016 Copa Sudamericana second stage
9	Palmeiras	38	15	8	15	60	51	+9	53	2016 Copa Libertadores second stage (Note: Palmeiras has a berth guaranteed to the second stage as the 2015 Copa do Brasil champions.)

Source: Soccerway.com
Rules for classification: 1) points; 2) wins; 3) goal difference; 4) goals scored; 5) head-to-head results; 6) least red cards received; 7) least yellow cards received; 8) draw.

==== Matches ====
10 May 1	Avaí	1–1	Santos	Florianópolis
18:30 UTC-03:00	Marquinhos 64'; Anderson Lopes (yellow card) 72'; Eltinho (yellow card) 90+5'	Report	27' Robinho; (yellow card) 63' (yellow-red card) 90+4' Gustavo Henrique; (yellow card) 87' Cicinho	Stadium: Ressacada; Attendance: 7,677; Referee: Dewson Fernando Freitas da Silva

17 May 2	Santos	1–0	Cruzeiro	Santos
16:00 UTC-03:00	Geuvânio 45'; Chiquinho (yellow card) 66'	Report	(yellow card) 65' Willians; (yellow card) 73' Fabrício; (yellow card) 84' Bruno Rodrigo; (yellow card) 90+3' Willian	Stadium: Vila Belmiro; Attendance: 7,246; Referee: Péricles Bassols

24 May 3	Chapecoense	1–0	Santos	Chapecó
16:00 UTC-03:00	Rafael Lima (yellow card) 7'; Apodi 21'; Gil (yellow card) 35'; Vilson (yellow card) 52'; Elicarlos (yellow card) 84'; Hyoran (yellow card) 90+3'	Report	(yellow card) 41' Ricardo Oliveira; (yellow card) 48' Geuvânio; (yellow card) 50' Lucas Otávio; (yellow card) 52' Robinho; (yellow card) 62' Lucas Lima; (yellow card) 88' Chiquinho	Stadium: Arena Condá; Attendance: 6,374; Referee: Jailson Macedo Freitas

31 May 4	Santos	2–2	Sport	Santos
11:00 UTC-03:00	Robinho 43'; Werley 70'; David Braz (yellow card) 84'	Report	(yellow card) 45+1' Wendel; 51' Joelinton; (yellow card) 69' Neto; 90+3' Samuel Xavier	Stadium: Vila Belmiro; Attendance: 13,481; Referee: Marcos André Gomes da Penha

3 June 5	São Paulo	3–2	Santos	São Paulo
21:00 UTC-03:00	Michel Bastos (yellow card) 24' (goal) 33'; Denílson (yellow card) 45'; Rogério Ceni (yellow card) 45+4' (goal) 85' (pen.); Paulo Miranda 50' (yellow card) 66'	Report	45+1', 47' (yellow card) 59' Ricardo Oliveira; (yellow card) 68' Lucas Otávio; (yellow card) 77' Werley; (red card) 87' Marquinhos Gabriel	Stadium: Morumbi; Attendance: 13,847; Referee: Thiago Duarte Peixoto

6 June 6	Santos	2–2	Ponte Preta	Santos
18:30 UTC-03:00	Geuvânio 23'; Lucas Lima (yellow card) 47'; Ricardo Oliveira 61' (pen.); Daniel Guedes (yellow card) 82'	Report	53' Felipe Azevedo; (yellow card) 60' Gilson; 72' Renato Cajá; (yellow card) 74' Fernando Bob	Stadium: Vila Belmiro; Attendance: 5,509; Referee: Vinícius Gonçalves Dias Araújo

10 June 7	Atlético Mineiro	2–2	Santos	Belo Horizonte
19:30 UTC-03:00	Werley 28' (o.g.); Dátolo 43'; Guilherme (yellow card) 90+4'	Report	19' Ricardo Oliveira; (yellow card) 39' Lucas Lima; (yellow card) 45' Werley; 54' Gabriel; (yellow card) 64' Gustavo Henrique; (yellow card) 90+1' Vladimir	Stadium: Estádio Independência; Attendance: 10,536; Referee: Wilton Pereira Sampaio

20 June 8	Santos	1–0	Corinthians	Santos
16:20 UTC-03:00	Ricardo Oliveira 10'; Daniel Guedes (yellow card) 24'; Rafael Longuine (yellow card) 51' (yellow-red card) 70'; Vladimir (yellow card) 81'; Geuvânio (yellow card) 83'; Neto Berola (yellow card) 90+2'	Report	(yellow card) 31' (yellow-red card) 74' Fagner; (yellow card) 39' Ralf; (yellow card) 72' Luciano; (yellow card) 90+4' Uendel	Stadium: Vila Belmiro; Attendance: 7,674; Referee: Luiz Flávio de Oliveira

28 June 9	Internacional	1–0	Santos	Porto Alegre
18:30 UTC-03:00	Jorge Henrique (yellow card) 14'; Valdívia 77'; Lisandro López (yellow card) 83'; William (yellow card) 85'	Report	(yellow card) 34' (yellow-red card) 78' David Braz; (yellow card) 76' Lucas Otávio; (yellow card) 90+4' Neto Berola	Stadium: Beira-Rio; Attendance: 26,143; Referee: Dewson Fernando Freitas da Silva

2 July 10	Fluminense	2–1	Santos	Rio de Janeiro
19:30 UTC-03:00	Fred 40'; Wágner (yellow card) 48'; Gerson (yellow card) 60'; Lucas Gomes 80'	Report	(yellow card) 27' Werley; (yellow card) 36' Thiago Maia; 54' Ricardo Oliveira; (yellow card) 63' Daniel Guedes	Stadium: Maracanã; Attendance: 11,437; Referee: Ricardo Marques Ribeiro

5 July 11	Santos	1–3	Grêmio	Santos
18:30 UTC-03:00	Gabriel (yellow card) 26'; Geuvânio (yellow card) 27' (yellow-red card) 28'; Caju (yellow card) 33'; David Braz (yellow card) 58'; Ricardo Oliveira 65'	Report	4' Pedro Rocha; 49' Rafael Galhardo; 81' Yuri Mamute; (yellow card) 90' Walace	Stadium: Vila Belmiro; Attendance: 4,942; Referee: Felipe Gomes da Silva

8 July 12	Goiás	4–1	Santos	Goiânia
19:30 UTC-03:00	Felipe Menezes 48' (pen.), 59'; Fred 52'; Carlos Eduardo 62'	Report	(yellow card) 19' Thiago Maia; (yellow card) 51' Daniel Guedes; (yellow card) 64' Werley; 90' (pen.) Ricardo Oliveira	Stadium: Serra Dourada; Attendance: 1,829; Referee: Anderson Daronco

11 July 13	Santos	3–0	Figueirense	Santos
18:30 UTC-03:00	David Braz 31'; Paulo Ricardo (yellow card) 41'; Lucas Lima 46'; Gabriel 63'	Report	(yellow card) 28' Yago; (yellow card) 33' Cereceda; (yellow card) 45+2' Rafael Bastos; (yellow card) 57' Fabinho; (yellow card) 80' Leandro Silva	Stadium: Vila Belmiro; Attendance: 8,393; Referee: André Luiz de Freitas Castro

19 July 14	Palmeiras	1–0	Santos	São Paulo
16:00 UTC-03:00	Leandro Pereira 15'; Leandro Almeida (yellow card) 32'; Arouca (yellow card) 45+3'; Egídio (yellow card) 70'	Report	(yellow card) 30' Ricardo Oliveira; (yellow card) 59' Werley; (yellow card) 90+5' Neto Berola	Stadium: Allianz Arena; Attendance: 38,220; Referee: Wagner do Nascimento Magalhães

26 July 15	Santos	2–0	Joinville	Santos
11:00 UTC-03:00	Gabriel 4', 18'; Zé Carlos (yellow card) 51'; David Braz (yellow card) 67'	Report	(yellow card) 14' Fabrício; (yellow card) 64' Anselmo	Stadium: Vila Belmiro; Attendance: 12,974; Referee: Ricardo Marques Ribeiro

2 August 16	Flamengo	2–2	Santos	Rio de Janeiro
16:00 UTC-03:00	Márcio Araújo (yellow card) 13'; Alan Patrick 40'; Emerson Sheik 42' (yellow card) 43'; Wallace (yellow card) 63'; Paolo Guerrero (yellow card) 90+4'	Report	(yellow card) 27' Zé Carlos; 52' Ricardo Oliveira; 72' Lucas Lima; (yellow card) 89' Werley	Stadium: Maracanã; Attendance: 61,421; Referee: Anderson Daronco

8 August 17	Santos	3–0	Coritiba	Santos
21:00 UTC-03:00	Lucas Lima (yellow card) 11'; Geuvânio 20'; Ivan 43' (o.g.); Ricardo Oliveira 60'	Report	(yellow card) 8' João Paulo; (yellow card) 10' Ivan; (yellow card) 23' Ruy; (yellow card) 35' Juninho	Stadium: Vila Belmiro; Attendance: 12,657; Referee: Igor Junior Benevenuto

12 August 18	Santos	1–0	Vasco da Gama	Santos
21:00 UTC-03:00	Gabriel (yellow card) 39'; Victor Ferraz 49'; Marquinhos Gabriel (yellow card) 82'; Ricardo Oliveira (yellow card) 82'	Report	(yellow card) 40' Serginho; (yellow card) 48' (yellow-red card) 80' Guiñazú; (yellow card) 68' Rafael Silva; (yellow card) 79' Herrera; (yellow card) 83' Thalles	Stadium: Vila Belmiro; Attendance: 12,038; Referee: Emerson Luiz Sobral

15 August 19	Atlético Paranaense	0–0	Santos	Curitiba
18:30 UTC-03:00	Alan Ruschel (yellow card) 34' (yellow-red card) 90+4'; Hernández (yellow card) 90+2'	Report	(yellow card) 79' Victor Ferraz	Stadium: Arena da Baixada; Attendance: 19,849; Referee: Bruno Arleu de Araujo

22 August 20	Santos	5–2	Avaí	Santos
18:30 UTC-03:00	Gabriel 11'; Thiago Maia 14'; Geuvânio (yellow card) 25'; Ricardo Oliveira 48'; Nilson 81'; Lucas Lima 90+2' (pen.)	Report	(yellow card) 24' Adriano; 29', 83' Léo Gamalho; (yellow card) 45' Jeci; (yellow card) 56' Romário	Stadium: Vila Belmiro; Attendance: 12,036; Referee: Leandro Pedro Vuaden

30 August 21	Cruzeiro	0–1	Santos	Belo Horizonte
18:30 UTC-03:00	Marinho (yellow card) 45+1'; Fabrício (yellow card) 84' (yellow-red card) 85'; De Arrascaeta (yellow card) 90+4'	Report	43' (yellow card) 73' Ricardo Oliveira; (yellow card) 88' Vanderlei	Stadium: Mineirão; Attendance: 8,271; Referee: Rodolpho Toski Marques

3 September 22	Santos	3–1	Chapecoense	Santos
19:30 UTC-03:00	Ricardo Oliveira 16', 76'; Geuvânio 58'	Report	(yellow card) 37' Ananias; 83' Neto	Stadium: Vila Belmiro; Attendance: 8,047; Referee: Bruno Arleu de Araujo

6 September 23	Sport	1–1	Santos	Recife
18:30 UTC-03:00	André 27'; Matheus Ferraz (yellow card) 46'	Report	21' Ricardo Oliveira	Stadium: Ilha do Retiro; Attendance: 6,129; Referee: Emerson de Almeida Ferreira

9 September 24	Santos	3–0	São Paulo	Santos
22:00 UTC-03:00	David Braz 32'; Rafael Longuine 43'; Thiago Maia (yellow card) 51'; Ricardo Oliveira 52'	Report	(yellow card) 50' Wesley	Stadium: Vila Belmiro; Attendance: 5,552; Referee: Luiz Flávio de Oliveira

13 September 25	Ponte Preta	3–1	Santos	Campinas
11:00 UTC-03:00	Bady 9'; Ferron 23'; Borges 44' (yellow card) 49'; Josimar (yellow card) 47'; Fernando Bob (yellow card) 58'; Felipe Azevedo (yellow card) 83'; Renato Chaves (yellow card) 90'	Report	(yellow card) 11' David Braz; (yellow card) 22' Daniel Guedes; 90+3' Rafael Longuine	Stadium: Moisés Lucarelli; Attendance: 8,273; Referee: Flávio Rodrigues de Souza

16 September 26	Santos	4–0	Atlético Mineiro	Santos
22:00 UTC-03:00	Gabriel 37', 55'; Ricardo Oliveira 71'; David Braz (yellow card) 90'; Marquinhos Gabriel 90+2'	Report	(yellow card) 38' Giovanni Augusto	Stadium: Vila Belmiro; Attendance: 6,179; Referee: Heber Roberto Lopes

20 September 27	Corinthians	2–0	Santos	São Paulo
11:00 UTC-03:00	Elias (yellow card) 65'; Jádson 86' (pen.), 88'; Felipe (yellow card) 90+2'	Report	(yellow card) 21' Ricardo Oliveira; (yellow card) 45+1' Marquinhos Gabriel; (yellow card) 45+1' (yellow-red card) 45+2' Werley; (yellow card) 73' Neto Berola; (yellow card) 75' Lucas Lima; (red card) 82' David Braz	Stadium: Arena Corinthians; Attendance: 41,748; Referee: Flávio Rodrigues Guerra

27 September 28	Santos	3–1	Internacional	Santos
11:00 UTC-03:00	Paulo Ricardo (yellow card) 25'; Marquinhos Gabriel 37'; Gabriel 60' (pen.); Leandro 90'	Report	27' (pen.) Valdívia; (yellow card) 30' William; (yellow card) 33' Wellington; (yellow card) 46' Juan; (yellow card) 59' Silva	Stadium: Vila Belmiro; Attendance: 11,043; Referee: Heber Roberto Lopes

4 October 29	Santos	3–1	Fluminense	Santos
16:00 UTC-03:00	Lucas Lima 5'; Marquinhos Gabriel 11'; Daniel Guedes (yellow card) 12'; Thiago Maia (yellow card) 38'; Neto Berola (yellow card) 77' (goal) 84'	Report	(yellow card) 34' Pierre; (yellow card) 70' Marlon; 90+2' Robert	Stadium: Vila Belmiro; Attendance: 7,491; Referee: Sandro Meira Ricci

15 October 30	Grêmio	1–0	Santos	Porto Alegre
21:00 UTC-03:00	Bressan 27'; Pedro Geromel (yellow card) 54'; Douglas (yellow card) 64'; Moisés (yellow card) 90+3'	Report	(yellow card) 15' Vanderlei; (yellow card) 88' David Braz; (yellow card) 90+3' (red card) 90+4' Gabriel	Stadium: Arena do Grêmio; Attendance: 8,837; Referee: Marielson Alves Silva

18 October 31	Santos	3–1	Goiás	Santos
17:00 UTC-02:00	Werley 12'; Ricardo Oliveira 15', 45+1'	Report	(yellow card) 45+2' (goal) 49' David	Stadium: Vila Belmiro; Attendance: 6,198; Referee: Anderson Daronco

24 October 32	Figueirense	0–0	Santos	Florianópolis
18:30 UTC-02:00	João Vitor (yellow card) 14'; Dudu (yellow card) 21'; Sueliton (yellow card) 41'; Thiago Heleno (yellow card) 79'; Fabinho (yellow card) 84'	Report	(yellow card) 55' Gustavo Henrique; (yellow card) 62' Ledesma	Stadium: Orlando Scarpelli; Attendance: 7,634; Referee: Leandro Pedro Vuaden

1 November 33	Santos	2–1	Palmeiras	Santos
17:00 UTC-02:00	Thiago Maia 27'; Ricardo Oliveira 49'; Gabriel (yellow card) 68'; Gustavo Henrique (yellow card) 77'; Zé Carlos (yellow card) 90+3'	Report	(yellow card) 24' Zé Roberto; (yellow card) 40' Thiago Santos; 75' (yellow card) 90+1' Dudu; (red card) 90' Cristaldo	Stadium: Vila Belmiro; Attendance: 11,767; Referee: Péricles Bassols

8 November 34	Joinville	0–0	Santos	Joinville
19:30 UTC-02:00	Rogério (red card) 9'; Marcelinho Paraíba (yellow card) 20'; Danrlei (yellow card) 50'; Fernando Viana (yellow card) 81'	Report	(yellow card) 22' Lucas Lima; (yellow card) 70' Daniel Guedes	Stadium: Arena Joinville; Attendance: 9,679; Referee: Wagner Reway

19 November 35	Santos	0–0	Flamengo	Santos
22:00 UTC-02:00	Thiago Maia (yellow card) 34'; Gustavo Henrique (yellow card) 37'	Report	(yellow card) 21' (yellow-red card) 90+3' Jorge; (yellow card) 69' Ayrton	Stadium: Vila Belmiro; Attendance: 8,071; Referee: Heber Roberto Lopes

22 November 36	Coritiba	1–0	Santos	Curitiba
19:30 UTC-02:00	Cáceres (yellow card) 33'; Carlinhos (yellow card) 34'; Henrique Almeida 58'; Walisson Maia (yellow card) 78'	Report	(yellow card) 43' Paulo Ricardo; (red card) 69' Vladimir; (yellow card) 73' Neto Berola; (yellow card) 81' Ledesma	Stadium: Couto Pereira; Attendance: 0 Referee: Marielson Alves Silva

29 November 37	Vasco da Gama	1–0	Santos	Rio de Janeiro
18:00 UTC-02:00	Nenê 45' (pen.); Rafael Silva (yellow card) 74'; Andrezinho (yellow card) 80'	Report	(yellow card) 38' Léo Cittadini; (yellow card) 44' Vanderlei	Stadium: São Januário; Attendance: 11,618; Referee: Leandro Vuaden

6 December 38	Santos	5–1	Atlético Paranaense	Santos
17:00 UTC-02:00	Geuvânio 14', 80'; Gabriel 29', 60'; Vitor Bueno 73'	Report	12' Cleberson; (yellow card) 76' Deivid	Stadium: Vila Belmiro; Attendance: 3,836; Referee: Marcelo de Lima Henrique

=== Copa do Brasil ===
==== First round ====
17 March 1st leg	Londrina	0–1	Santos	Londrina
19:30 UTC-03:00	Paulinho (yellow card) 6'; Germano (yellow card) 51'; Dirceu (yellow card) 70'	Report	(yellow card) 30' Lucas Lima; 53' (pen.) Robinho; (yellow card) 71' Cicinho; (yellow card) 86' Valencia	Stadium: Estádio do Café; Attendance: 10,917; Referee: Paulo Henrique de Melo Salmazio (MS)

15 April 2nd leg	Santos	1–0 (2–0 agg.)	Londrina	Santos
19:30 UTC-03:00	Gustavo Henrique (yellow card) 2'; Lucas Lima (yellow card) 43'; Elano 49'	Report	(yellow card) 45' Jhon Murillo; (yellow card) 64' Wéverton; (yellow card) 69' Dirceu; (yellow card) 78' Diogo Roque; (yellow card) 82' Henry; (yellow card) 90' Silvio	Stadium: Vila Belmiro; Attendance: 11,134; Referee: Igor Junior Benevenuto

==== Second round ====
6 May 1st leg	Maringá	2–2	Santos	Maringá
22:00 UTC-03:00	Ítalo (yellow card) 57'; Rafael Santiago (yellow card) 68'; Rhuan (yellow card) 78'; Fabiano 83'; Rodrigo Dantas 90+2' (yellow card) 90+3'	Report	24' (yellow card) 64' Elano; (yellow card) 32' Gabriel; 55' Marquinhos Gabriel; (yellow card) 74' Paulo Ricardo; (yellow card) 82' Cicinho	Stadium: Willie Davids; Attendance: 16,142; Referee: Thiago de Alencar Gonzaga

13 May 2nd leg	Santos	1–0 (3–2 agg.)	Maringá	Santos
19:30 UTC-03:00	Valencia (yellow card) 36'; Werley (yellow card) 38'; Leandrinho (yellow card) 75'; Ricardo Oliveira 90'	Report	(yellow card) 10' (yellow-red card) 62' Eurico; (yellow card) 29' Gerônimo; (yellow card) 33' Edinho; (yellow card) 42' Ítalo; (yellow card) 62' Fabiano; (yellow card) 90' Rhuan	Stadium: Vila Belmiro; Attendance: 4,068; Referee: Wagner Reway

==== Third round ====
20 May 1st leg	Sport	2–1	Santos	Recife
22:00 UTC-03:00	Régis 4'; Joelinton (yellow card) 44'; Wendel (yellow card) 69'; Renê 74'; Mike (yellow card) 82'	Report	21' (yellow card) 77' Lucas Lima; (yellow card) 35' Robinho; (yellow card) 64' Ricardo Oliveira	Stadium: Estádio Ilha do Retiro; Attendance: 6,443; Referee: Cláudio Francisco Lima e Silva

22 July 2nd leg	Santos	3–1 (4–3 agg.)	Sport	Santos
22:00 UTC-03:00	Gabriel 2', 25'; Victor Ferraz (yellow card) 19'; Ricardo Oliveira (yellow card) 28'; Werley (yellow card) 38'; Geuvânio 58'; Elano (yellow card) 88'; Vanderlei (yellow card) 90+4'	Report	40' Diego Souza; (yellow card) 49' Ferrugem; (yellow card) 74' Renê; (yellow card) 80' Rodrigo Mancha	Stadium: Vila Belmiro; Attendance: 8,370; Referee: Paulo Henrique de Melo Salmazio

==== Round of 16 ====
19 August 1st leg	Santos	2–0	Corinthians	Santos
22:00 UTC-03:00	Gabriel 31'; Marquinhos Gabriel 78'; Lucas Lima (yellow card) 87'	Report	(yellow card) 82' Fagner	Stadium: Vila Belmiro; Attendance: 10,383; Referee: Wilton Pereira Sampaio

26 August 2nd leg	Corinthians	1–2 (1–4 agg.)	Santos	São Paulo
22:00 UTC-03:00	Vágner Love (yellow card) 35'; Bruno Henrique (yellow card) 44'; Felipe (yellow card) 56'; Romero 73'; Gil (yellow card) 85'	Report	15' Gabriel; (yellow card) 44' (goal) 65' Ricardo Oliveira; (yellow card) 73' Lucas Lima	Stadium: Arena Corinthians; Attendance: 37,338; Referee: Ricardo Marques Ribeiro

==== Quarter-finals ====
23 September 1st leg	Figueirense	0–1	Santos	Florianópolis
19:30 UTC-03:00	Leandro Silva (yellow card) 78'	Report	(yellow card) 23' (goal) 79' (pen.) Gabriel; (yellow card) 54' Victor Ferraz	Stadium: Orlando Scarpelli; Attendance: 9,212; Referee: Anderson Daronco

1 October 2nd leg	Santos	3–2 (4–2 agg.)	Figueirense	São Paulo
21:00 UTC-03:00	Gabriel 21'; Marquinhos Gabriel 28'; Neto Berola 48'	Report	38' Bruno Alves; (yellow card) 53' Leandro Silva; (yellow card) 69' Saimon; (yellow card) 84' (goal) 87' Carlos Alberto; (yellow card) 90+3' Jefferson	Stadium: Pacaembu; Attendance: 25,939; Referee: André Luiz de Freitas Castro

==== Semi-finals ====
21 October 1st leg	São Paulo	1–3	Santos	São Paulo
22:00 UTC-02:00	Alexandre Pato 26'; Luís Fabiano (yellow card) 59'; Lucão (yellow card) 70'; Centurión (yellow card) 79'; Thiago Mendes (yellow card) 87'	Report	15' Gabriel; 46' Ricardo Oliveira; 50' (yellow card) 85' Marquinhos Gabriel	Stadium: Morumbi; Attendance: 26,434; Referee: Raphael Claus

28 October 2nd leg	Santos	3–1 (6–2 agg.)	São Paulo	Santos
22:00 UTC-02:00	Ricardo Oliveira 12', 24'; Marquinhos Gabriel 21'	Report	(yellow card) 7' Luís Fabiano; (yellow card) 70' Matheus Reis; 72' Michel Bastos	Stadium: Vila Belmiro; Attendance: 13,932; Referee: Luiz Flavio de Oliveira

==== Finals ====
25 November 1st leg	Santos	1–0	Palmeiras	Santos
22:00 UTC-02:00	Renato (yellow card) 60'; Ricardo Oliveira (yellow card) 63'; Gabriel 79' (yellow card) 80'; Victor Ferraz (yellow card) 84'	Report	(yellow card) 32' Fernando Prass; (yellow card) 38' Matheus Sales; (yellow card) 44' Barrios; (yellow card) 63' Arouca; (yellow card) 70' (yellow-red card) 90' Lucas; (yellow card) 90+1' Dudu	Stadium: Vila Belmiro; Attendance: 14,116; Referee: Luiz Flávio de Oliveira

2 December 2nd leg	Palmeiras	2–1 (2–2 agg.) (4–3 p)	Santos	São Paulo
22:00 UTC-02:00	Matheus Sales (yellow card) 50'; Dudu 56', 84', (yellow card) 90'; João Pedro (yellow card) 66'	Report	(yellow card) 48' Gabriel; 87' Ricardo Oliveira	Stadium: Allianz Parque; Attendance: 39,660; Referee: Héber Roberto Lopes
	Penalties
	Zé Roberto (penalty scored); Rafael Marques (penalty missed); Jackson (penalty scored); Cristaldo (penalty scored); Fernando Prass (penalty scored)		(penalty missed) Marquinhos Gabriel; (penalty missed) Gustavo Henrique; (penalty scored) Geuvânio; (penalty scored) Lucas Lima; (penalty scored) Ricardo Oliveira

=== Campeonato Paulista ===
==== Results summary ====
Overall								Home						Away					
Pld	W	D	L	GF	GA	GD	Pts	W	D	L	GF	GA	GD	W	D	L	GF	GA	GD
19	13	4	2	36	15	+21	43	9	2	0	23	8	+15	4	2	2	13	7	+6

Last updated: 3 May 2015.

==== Group stage ====
Pos	Team	Pld	W	D	L	GF	GA	GD	Pts	Qualification
1	Santos (A)	15	10	4	1	29	12	+17	34	Advance to the quarter-finals
2	XV de Piracicaba (A)	15	5	3	7	17	20	−3	18	Advance to the quarter-finals
3	Capivariano	15	4	4	7	20	23	−3	16	
4	Penapolense	15	4	3	8	17	22	−5	15	
5	Bragantino	15	2	1	12	8	22	−14	7	

Source: Globo Esporte
(A) Advance to a further round

==== Matches ====
1 February 1	Santos	3–0	Ituano	Santos
19:30 UTC-02:00	Geuvânio 6', 56'; Chiquinho 29' (yellow card) 90+2'; Gustavo Henrique (yellow card) 67'	Report	(yellow card) 43' Clayson; (yellow card) 61' Leonardo; (yellow card) 75' Ricardinho	Stadium: Vila Belmiro; Attendance: 9,121; Referee: Antônio Rogério Batista Prado

4 February 2	Mogi Mirim	0–0	Santos	Mogi Mirim
22:00 UTC-02:00	Leonardo de Jesus (yellow card) 48'	Report	(yellow card) 41' Thiago Ribeiro; (yellow card) 45' Alison; (yellow card) 61' Geuvânio	Stadium: Romildão; Attendance: 2,906; Referee: Leonardo Ferreira Lima

8 February 3	Santos	2–1	Red Bull Brasil	Santos
19:30 UTC-02:00	Fabiano Eller 3' (o.g.); Ricardo Oliveira 45+2' (pen.); Cicinho (yellow card) 58' (yellow-red card) 87'; Alison (yellow card) 81'	Report	(yellow card) 33' Wilson Júnior; 44' Edmílson; (yellow card) 45+1' Juninho; (yellow card) 70' Jonas; (yellow card) 75' Everton Silva	Stadium: Vila Belmiro; Attendance: 8,158; Referee: Rodrigo Guarizo do Amaral

11 February 4	Santos	0–0	São Paulo	Santos
22:00 UTC-02:00	David Braz (yellow card) 28'; Robinho (yellow card) 61'; Elano (yellow card) 90+1'	Report	(yellow card) 45' Toloi; (yellow card) 61' Reinaldo; (yellow card) 76' Luís Fabiano	Stadium: Vila Belmiro; Attendance: 8,867; Referee: Leandro Marinho Bizzio

14 February 5	São Bernardo	0–1	Santos	São Bernardo do Campo
17:00 UTC-02:00	Lúcio Flávio (yellow card) 41'; Marino (yellow card) 90+1'; Vicente (yellow card) 90+2'	Report	54' (yellow card) 55' David Braz; (yellow card) 65' Renato; (yellow card) 90+1' Robinho	Stadium: Primeiro de Maio; Attendance: 9,959; Referee: Flavio Rodrigues de Souza

22 February 6	Portuguesa	1–3	Santos	São Paulo
16:00 UTC-03:00	Fabinho Capixaba (yellow card) 7'; Alex Lima (yellow card) 33' (yellow card) 56' (red card); Jean Mota 89'	Report	17', 33' Robinho; (yellow card) 21' (goal) 44' Cicinho	Stadium: Pacaembu; Attendance: 12,814; Referee: Marcelo Aparecido Ribeiro

1 March 7	Santos	4–2	Linense	São Paulo
18:30 UTC-03:00	Robinho 4', 90' (yellow card) 5'; Renato 38'; Anderson 49' (o.g.); David Braz (yellow card) 90+1'	Report	(yellow card) 60' Gilsinho; 69' (pen.) Diego; (yellow card) 70' Moisés Ribeiro; 73' William Pottker	Stadium: Pacaembu; Attendance: 10,954; Referee: Douglas Marques das Flores

8 March 8	Botafogo	0–3	Santos	Ribeirão Preto
18:30 UTC-03:00	Gimenez (yellow card) 45+2'; Wesley (yellow card) 65'; Denis (yellow card) 72'	Report	23' Werley; (yellow card) 34' Vanderlei; 70', 90+2' Ricardo Oliveira; (yellow card) 80' Valencia	Stadium: Santa Cruz; Attendance: 7,326; Referee: Vinícius Gonçalves Dias Araújo

11 March 9	Santos	2–1	Palmeiras	Santos
22:00 UTC-03:00	Geuvânio (yellow card) 23'; Renato 27'; Ricardo Oliveira (yellow card) 32' (goal) 62'; Valencia (yellow card) 82'; Lucas Lima (yellow card) 85'; David Braz (yellow card) 90+3'	Report	7' Vitor Hugo; (yellow card) 31' Arouca; (yellow card) 73' Dudu; (yellow card) 84' Tobio	Stadium: Vila Belmiro; Attendance: 11,816; Referee: Thiago Duarte Peixoto

14 March 10	Marília	1–4	Santos	Marília
18:30 UTC-03:00	Bruno Farias 65'; Gilberto Neto (yellow card) 90+2'	Report	32', 76' Thiago Ribeiro; 64' Marquinhos Gabriel; (yellow card) 69' Valencia; 82' Gabriel	Stadium: Bento de Abreu; Attendance: 6,849; Referee: Adriano de Assis Miranda

22 March 11	Santos	1–0	Grêmio Audax	São Paulo
18:30 UTC-03:00	Ricardo Oliveira 18'; Cicinho (yellow card) 51'; Lucas Lima (yellow card) 72'	Report	(yellow card) 28' André Andrade; (yellow card) 78' Camacho	Stadium: Pacaembu; Attendance: 9,113; Referee: José Claudio Rocha Filho

26 March 12	Ponte Preta	3–1	Santos	Campinas
21:00 UTC-03:00	Fernando Bob (yellow card) 15'; Biro-Biro 29'; Bruno Silva 36'; Jeferson (yellow card) 43'; Rildo 50' (yellow card) 56'	Report	(yellow card) 36' (yellow card) 90+6' (red card) Cicinho; 46' Gabriel; (yellow card) 67' (yellow card) 74' (red card) Valencia; (yellow card) 83' Elano	Stadium: Moisés Lucarelli; Attendance: 4,907; Referee: Luiz Vanderlei Martinucho

29 March 13	Santos	2–2	São Bento	Santos
18:30 UTC-03:00	Ricardo Oliveira 15' (pen.); Lucas Otávio (yellow card) 45'; Gabriel (yellow card) 59' (goal) 68'	Report	11' Renan; 58' Éder	Stadium: Vila Belmiro; Attendance: 5,149; Referee: Flávio Rodrigues de Souza

5 April 14	Corinthians	1–1	Santos	São Paulo
16:00 UTC-03:00	Felipe 42'; Fagner (yellow card) 64'; Emerson Sheik (yellow card) 85'	Report	(yellow card) 56' Valencia; 58' Ricardo Oliveira; (yellow card) 66' Lucas Lima; (yellow card) 75' Victor Ferraz; (yellow card) 85' Geuvânio; (yellow card) 90' Cicinho	Stadium: Arena Corinthians; Attendance: 32,199; Referee: Vinícius Gonçalves Dias Araújo

8 April 15	Santos	2–0	Rio Claro	Santos
22:00 UTC-03:00	Ricardo Oliveira 6'; David Braz 90'	Report	(yellow card) 42' Jeferson Paulista; (yellow card) 68' Bruno Cantanhede	Stadium: Vila Belmiro; Attendance: 4,720; Referee: Luiz Flávio de Oliveira

==== Knockout stage ====
===== Quarter-final =====
12 April Quarter-final	Santos	3–0	XV de Piracicaba	Santos
16:00 UTC-03:00	Lucas Lima (yellow card) 10' (goal) 90'; Robinho 18' (pen.); Leandrinho (yellow card) 66'; Ricardo Oliveira 81' (pen.)	Report	(yellow card) 45' Tony; (yellow card) 50' Fabiano; (yellow card) 58' Renan Foguinho; (yellow card) 79' Leonardo Luiz	Stadium: Vila Belmiro; Attendance: 11,260; Referee: Guilherme Ceretta de Lima

===== Semi-final =====
19 April Semi-final	Santos	2–1	São Paulo	Santos
18:30 UTC-03:00	Geuvânio 36'; Ricardo Oliveira 76'; Leandrinho (yellow card) 88'	Report	(yellow card) 63' Wesley; 87' Luís Fabiano; (yellow card) 89' Michel Bastos	Stadium: Vila Belmiro; Attendance: 13,459; Referee: Raphael Claus

===== Finals =====
26 April 1st leg	Palmeiras	1–0	Santos	São Paulo
16:00 UTC-03:00	Cleiton Xavier (yellow card) 20'; Leandro Pereira 30'; Vitor Hugo (yellow card) 42'; Gabriel (yellow card) 62'; Victor Ramos (yellow card) 89'	Report	(red card) 58' Paulo Ricardo; (yellow card) 76' Lucas Lima	Stadium: Allianz Parque; Attendance: 39,479; Referee: Vinicius Furlan

3 May 2nd leg	Santos	2–1 (2–2 agg.) (4–2 p)	Palmeiras	Santos
16:00 UTC-03:00	Valencia (yellow card) 16'; David Braz 30' (yellow card) 87'; Ricardo Oliveira 44'; Geuvânio (red card) 45+1'	Report	(yellow card) 4' (red card) 45+1' Dudu; (yellow card) 9' Valdivia; (yellow card) 25' Gabriel; (yellow card) 61' (red card) 78' Victor Ramos; 65' (yellow card) 90+2' Lucas	Stadium: Vila Belmiro; Attendance: 14,662; Referee: Guilherme Ceretta de Lima
	Penalties
	David Braz (penalty scored); Gustavo Henrique (penalty scored); Victor Ferraz (penalty scored); Lucas Lima (penalty scored)		(penalty scored) Cleiton Xavier; (penalty missed) Rafael Marques; (penalty missed) Jackson; (penalty scored) Leandro Pereira
