= Edwin Valencia =

Colombian footballer (born 1985)

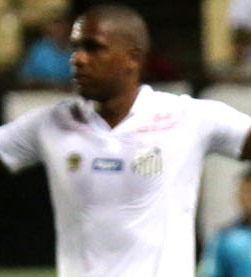
- Valencia with Santos in 2016

Personal information
- Full name: Edwin Armando Valencia Rodríguez
- Date of birth: 29 March 1985 (age 41)
- Place of birth: Florida, Colombia
- Height: 1.85 m (6 ft 1 in)
- Position: Defensive midfielder

Youth career
- 1996–2003: América de Cali

Senior career*
Years	Team	Apps	(Gls)
2004–2006	América de Cali	62	(5)
2007–2010	Atlético Paranaense	84	(0)
2010–2014	Fluminense	67	(0)
2015–2016	Santos	3	(0)
2017	Atlético Nacional	12	(0)

International career
2005	Colombia U20	5	(0)
2006–2015	Colombia	19	(0)
- * Club domestic league appearances and goals as of 23 November 2017

Edwin Armando Valencia Rodríguez (Spanish pronunciation: [ˈeðwim baˈlensja]; born 29 March 1985) is a Colombian footballer who plays as a defensive midfielder.

== Club career ==
=== Early career ===
Born in Florida, Valle del Cauca, Valencia joined América de Cali's youth setup in 1996, aged 11. He was promoted to the main squad in January 2004, appearing in 14 matches and scoring three goals in the campaign.

=== Atlético Paranaense ===
In 2007, after having his wage cut by half and thus forcing a release from América, Valencia moved abroad for the first time in his career, joining Atlético Paranense on a free transfer, along with fellow countryman and teammate Julián Viáfara. He made his Série A debut on 24 June 2007, starting in a 2–0 away win against Palmeiras.

On 12 April 2008 Valencia scored his first goal for Furacão, netting the game's winner in a home success against Toledo Colônia Work for the Campeonato Paranaense championship. He was an undisputed starter for the club, which his side narrowly avoiding relegation in the following seasons.

=== Fluminense ===
On 15 June 2010 Valencia moved to fellow league team Fluminense. He soon profited from Diogo's injury, being an important midfield unit as the club was crowned champions.

Valencia subsequently struggled with injuries and fell down through the pecking order, appearing rarely in 2012 and 2013. In 2014, despite appearing regularly, his contract was not renewed and he left Flu on 12 December.

=== Santos ===
On 16 January 2015 Valencia signed a one-year deal with Santos, also in the main level of Brazilian football. He was regularly used during the year's Campeonato Paulista, but was received little playing time after recovering from a severe knee injury suffered while in international duty.

On 5 December 2016 Valencia left Santos, after being told that his contract – expiring in the end of the month – would not be renewed.

=== Atlético Nacional ===
On 12 January 2017, Valencia returned to his homeland after agreeing to a one-year deal with Atlético Nacional.

== International career ==
After appearing with Colombia under-20s in 2005, Valencia made his debut with the full squad on 30 May 2006, coming on as a second half substitute for Fabián Vargas in a 2–1 friendly away win against Poland.

On 28 May 2014, after being regularly called up by manager José Pékerman, Valencia suffered an injury which forced him out of 2014 FIFA World Cup. Called up for 2015 Copa América, he started the first three games of the competition, suffering a serious knee injury in the last one and being sidelined for six months.

== Career statistics ==
=== Club ===
As of 23 November 2017

Club	Season	League			State League		Cup		Continental		Other		Total	
Club	Season	Division	Apps	Goals	Apps	Goals	Apps	Goals	Apps	Goals	Apps	Goals	Apps	Goals
América de Cali	2004	Categoría Primera A	14	3	—		—		—		—		14	3
América de Cali	2005	Categoría Primera A	31	0	—		—		6 (Note: Appearance(s) in Copa Libertadores)	0	—		37	0
América de Cali	2006	Categoría Primera A	17	2	—		—		—		—		17	2
América de Cali	Subtotal		62	5	—		—		6	0	—		68	5
Atlético Paranaense	2007	Série A	20	0	—		—		1 (Note: Appearance(s) in Copa Sudamericana)	0	—		21	0
Atlético Paranaense	2008	Série A	27	0	20	1	2	0	1	0	—		50	1
Atlético Paranaense	2009	Série A	32	0	12	0	1	0	2	0	—		47	0
Atlético Paranaense	2010	Série A	5	0	15	0	5	0	—		—		25	0
Atlético Paranaense	Subtotal		84	0	47	1	8	0	4	0	—		143	1
Fluminense	2010	Série A	17	0	—		—		—		—		17	0
Fluminense	2011	Série A	19	0	9	0	—		8	0	—		36	0
Fluminense	2012	Série A	9	0	9	0	—		4	0	—		22	0
Fluminense	2013	Série A	3	0	6	0	—		1	0	—		10	0
Fluminense	2014	Série A	19	0	11	0	3	0	—		—		33	0
Fluminense	Subtotal		67	0	35	0	3	0	13	0	—		118	0
Santos	2015	Série A	2	0	10	0	4	0	—		—		16	0
Santos	2016	Série A	1	0	0	0	1	0	0	0	—		2	0
Santos	Subtotal		3	0	11	0	4	0	0	0	—		18	0
Atlético Nacional	2017	Categoría Primera A	12	0	—		3	0	0	0	—		15	0
Career total			228	5	93	1	18	0	23	0	—		362	6

=== International ===
As of 21 June 2015

Colombia
Year	Apps	Goals
2006	5	0
2012	5	0
2013	4	0
2014	1	0
2015	4	0
Total	19	0

== Honours ==
=== Club ===
Atlético Paranaense

- Campeonato Paranaense: 2009

Fluminense

- Série A: 2010, 2012
- Taça Guanabara: 2012
- Campeonato Carioca: 2012

Santos

- Campeonato Paulista: 2015, 2016

=== International ===
Colombia U20

- South American Youth Football Championship: 2005
