= Rafael Longuine =

Brazilian footballer

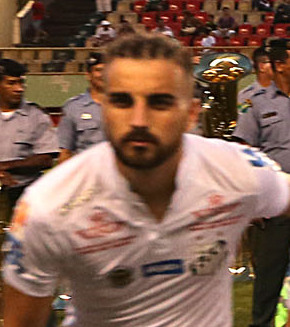
- Longuine with Santos in 2016

Personal information
- Full name: Rafael Vinícius Carvalho Longuine
- Date of birth: 30 May 1990 (age 36)
- Place of birth: Paranavaí, Brazil
- Height: 1.74 m (5 ft 8 1/2 in)
- Position: Attacking midfielder

Team information
- Current team: CRB

Youth career
- 2003–2007: RS Futebol
- 2007–2009: Juventude
- 2009: XV de Jaú

Senior career*
| Years | Team | Apps | (Gls) |
| 2010–2011 | Comercial-SP | 12 | (4) |
| 2011 | → Inter de Bebedouro (loan) | 10 | (1) |
| 2011–2012 | LASK Linz | 10 | (3) |
| 2012–2013 | Comercial-SP | 13 | (0) |
| 2013–2014 | Rio Branco-SP | 18 | (5) |
| 2014 | Red Bull Brasil | 0 | (0) |
| 2015 | Audax | 15 | (8) |
| 2015–2021 | Santos | 37 | (5) |
| 2017 | → Coritiba (loan) | 7 | (0) |
| 2018 | → Guarani (loan) | 34 | (10) |
| 2019 | → Ponte Preta (loan) | 9 | (2) |
| 2020 | → CRB (loan) | 11 | (7) |
| 2021 | Operário Ferroviário | 14 | (0) |
| 2022–2023 | CRB | 59 | (7) |
| 2024- | Londrina | 13 | (1) |
- * Club domestic league appearances and goals as of 03:02, 16 March 2020 (UTC)

Rafael Vinícius Carvalho Longuine (born 30 May 1990), known as Rafael Longuine, is a Brazilian footballer who plays as an attacking midfielder for CRB.

== Club career ==
=== Early career ===
Born in Paranavaí, Paraná, Longuine joined Juventude's youth setup in 2007, after starting it out at RS Futebol. He also had failed trials at Corinthians, São Paulo, Fluminense and Grêmio.

=== LASK Linz ===
After playing for clubs in the São Paulo state, Longuine moved to LASK Linz in February 2012. He played his first match as a professional on 2 March 2012, starting and scoring a brace in a 3–2 home win against SC Rheindorf Altach.

=== Return to Brazil ===
Despite scoring three goals in nine matches, Longuine returned to Brazil after struggling with cold and with the country. After another spell at Comercial-SP, he moved to Rio Branco-SP, being the latter's top goalscorer in 2014 Paulistão A2.

In 2014 Longuine joined Red Bull Brasil, representing the side in the year's Copa Paulista. On 2 December 2014 he moved to São Bento, but in the following month signed for Grêmio Osasco Audax.

Longuine was an undisputed starter for Audax, scoring a hat-trick against his former side Red Bull on 6 March 2015. He finished the tournament with eight goals, being his side's top goalscorer and the third overall.

=== Santos ===
On 14 April 2015 Longuine signed a three-year deal with Santos. He made his debut for the side on 24 May, coming on as a second-half substitute for Leandrinho in a 0–1 Série A away loss against Chapecoense.

Longuine scored his first goal in the main category of Brazilian football on 9 September, netting the second in a 3–0 home win against rivals São Paulo. However, he struggle to feature regularly in the following years, being mainly a backup to Lucas Lima.

On 12 May 2017, Longuine extended his contract with Peixe until 2020.

==== Coritiba (loan) ====
On 22 August 2017 Longuine was loaned to Coritiba until the end of the season. He made his debut for the side on 28 August, starting in a 0–1 Série A home loss against Vitória, missing a penalty kick.

==== Guarani (loan) ====
Longuine returned to Santos for the 2018 campaign, but did not appear. On 25 April 2018, he joined Guarani on loan until the end of the season, along with teammate Matheus Oliveira. At the club, he was an undisputed starter, scoring ten goals and ending the season as the club's topscorer; highlights included a brace in a 2–1 home win against Brasil de Pelotas on 28 July.

==== Ponte Preta (loan) ====
On 30 January 2019, Longuine agreed to a one-year loan deal with Guarani's fierce rivals Ponte Preta. However, he struggled with injuries during his period at the club, and had his loan cut short on 31 October.

==== CRB (loan) ====
On 9 January 2020, CRB announced the signing of Longuine on a one-year loan deal. In March, after impressing in his first matches, he suffered a serious knee injury and was sidelined for the remainder of the campaign.

=== Operário Ferroviário ===
On 5 August 2021, Longuine joined second division side Operário Ferroviário until the end of the year.

== Personal life ==
On 2 May 2017, Longuine's parents deceased from a car accident in the BR-376 highway.

== Career statistics ==
As of 15 March 2020

| Club | Season | League | | | State League | | Cup | | Continental | | Other | | Total | |
| Club | Season | Division | Apps | Goals | Apps | Goals | Apps | Goals | Apps | Goals | Apps | Goals | Apps | Goals |
|---|---|---|---|---|---|---|---|---|---|---|---|---|---|---|
| Comercial-SP | 2010 | Paulista A3 | — | | 12 | 4 | — | | — | | — | | 12 | 4 |
| Comercial-SP | 2011 | Paulista A2 | — | | — | | — | | — | | 25 (Note: Appearance(s) in Copa Paulista) | 2 | 25 | 2 |
| Comercial-SP | Subtotal | | — | | 12 | 4 | — | | — | | 25 | 2 | 37 | 6 |
| Inter de Bebedouro | 2011 | Paulista A3 | — | | 10 | 1 | — | | — | | — | | 10 | 1 |
| LASK Linz | 2011–12 | Austrian First League | 10 | 3 | — | | — | | — | | — | | 10 | 3 |
| Comercial-SP | 2012 | Paulista | — | | — | | — | | — | | 8 | 1 | 8 | 1 |
| Comercial-SP | 2013 | Paulista A2 | — | | 13 | 0 | — | | — | | — | | 13 | 0 |
| Comercial-SP | Subtotal | | — | | 13 | 0 | — | | — | | 8 | 1 | 21 | 1 |
| Rio Branco-SP | 2013 | Paulista A2 | — | | — | | — | | — | | 17 | 5 | 17 | 5 |
| Rio Branco-SP | 2014 | Paulista A2 | — | | 18 | 5 | — | | — | | — | | 18 | 5 |
| Rio Branco-SP | Subtotal | | — | | 18 | 5 | — | | — | | 17 | 5 | 35 | 10 |
| Red Bull Brasil | 2014 | Paulista A2 | — | | — | | — | | — | | 17 | 4 | 17 | 4 |
| Audax | 2015 | Paulista | — | | 15 | 8 | — | | — | | — | | 15 | 8 |
| Santos | 2015 | Série A | 12 | 2 | 0 | 0 | 2 | 0 | — | | — | | 14 | 2 |
| Santos | 2016 | Série A | 6 | 0 | 9 | 1 | 5 | 1 | — | | — | | 20 | 2 |
| Santos | 2017 | Série A | 4 | 0 | 6 | 2 | 1 | 0 | 0 | 0 | — | | 11 | 2 |
| Santos | Subtotal | | 22 | 2 | 15 | 3 | 8 | 1 | 0 | 0 | — | | 45 | 6 |
| Coritiba (loan) | 2017 | Série A | 7 | 0 | — | | — | | — | | — | | 7 | 0 |
| Guarani (loan) | 2018 | Série B | 34 | 10 | — | | — | | — | | — | | 34 | 10 |
| Ponte Preta (loan) | 2019 | Série B | 9 | 2 | 0 | 0 | 0 | 0 | — | | — | | 9 | 2 |
| CRB (loan) | 2020 | Série B | 0 | 0 | 2 | 1 | 3 | 2 | — | | 6 (Note: Appearance(s) in Copa do Nordeste) | 4 | 11 | 7 |
| Operário Ferroviário | 2021 | Série B | 0 | 0 | — | | — | | — | | — | | 0 | 0 |
| Total | | | 82 | 17 | 85 | 22 | 11 | 3 | 0 | 0 | 73 | 16 | 251 | 58 |

== Honours ==
=== Club ===
Santos

- Campeonato Paulista: 2016

=== Individual ===
- Campeonato Paulista Best newcomer: 2015
