= Vladimir (footballer) =

Brazilian footballer (born 1980)

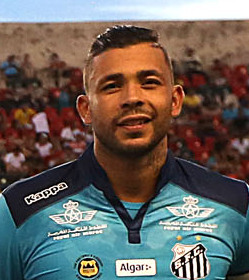
- Vladimir with Santos in 2016

Personal information
- Full name: Vladimir Orlando Cardoso de Araújo Filho
- Date of birth: 16 July 1989 (age 37)
- Place of birth: Ipiaú, Brazil
- Height: 1.90 m (6 ft 3 in)
- Position: Goalkeeper

Team information
- Current team: Atlético Goianiense

Youth career
- 2003–2009: Santos

Senior career*
Years	Team	Apps	(Gls)
2009–2021	Santos	70	(0)
2009	→ Fortaleza (loan)	0	(0)
2019	→ Avaí (loan)	41	(0)
2021–2022	Avaí	26	(0)
2023–2025	Santos	4	(0)
2024	→ Guarani (loan)	30	(0)
2025–	Atlético Goianiense	13	(0)
- * Club domestic league appearances and goals as of 17 December 2025

Vladimir Orlando Cardoso de Araújo Filho (born 16 July 1989), simply known as Vladimir (Brazilian Portuguese: [vladʒiˈmiʁ]), is a Brazilian footballer who plays as a goalkeeper for Atlético Goianiense.

== Career ==
=== Santos ===
Born in Ipiaú, Bahia, Vladimir graduated from Santos' youth system. On 18 September 2009, he was loaned to Fortaleza, but failed to make an appearance with the club (being only third-choice goalkeeper), and returned to his parent club two months later.

On 2 February 2011 Vladimir made his first team debut, replacing field player Anderson Carvalho in a 2–2 away draw against Ponte Preta, after Rafael was sent off. He was handed his first start three days later, in a 1–1 away draw against Santo André.

Mainly a backup to Rafael, Vladimir was further demoted after Aranha's arrival in 2012, being only selected on the bench in some occasions during that year. Rafael subsequently left in 2013, and he subsequently was a backup to Aranha.

In September 2014, profiting from Aranha's injury, Vladimir appeared more regularly until the return of the former, only suffering one goal in the process. On 14 January 2015 he signed a new deal with Peixe, until December.

In 2015, after new signing Vanderlei suffered an injury, Vladimir was a starter in that year's Campeonato Paulista winning campaign. He made a double recovery save in a 1–1 away draw against Corinthians on 5 April (it was also his first derby as a professional), and saved a penalty in the shoot-out in the final against Palmeiras on 3 May.

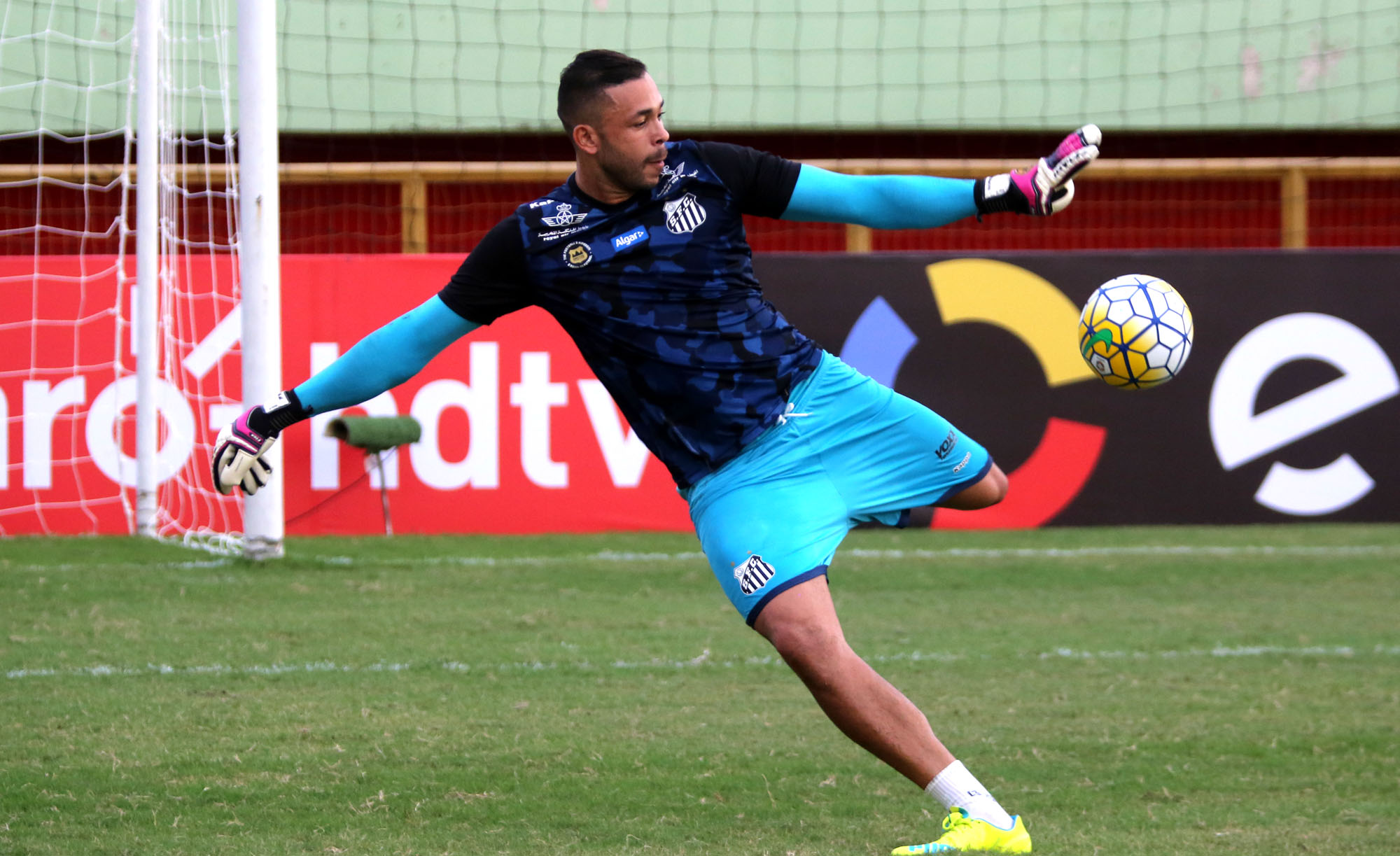
Vladimir warming up with Santos in 2016

On 21 August 2015, after already returning to the bench, Vladimir renewed his contract until December 2016. On 26 September of the following year he further extended his link, signing until 2018.

In 2017, as Vanderlei suffered another injury, Vladimir again became a regular starter. Despite already winning the Copa Libertadores in 2011 as a third-choice, he made his debut in the competition on 9 March 2017 by starting in a 1–1 away draw against Sporting Cristal.

==== Avaí (loan) ====
On 24 January 2019, Vladimir joined fellow top tier side Avaí on a one-year loan deal. He became an undisputed starter for the side, winning the Campeonato Catarinense but suffering relegation from the top tier.

==== Return from loan ====
Initially a backup to Everson, Vladimir became the first-choice after the departure of the former to Atlético Mineiro until suffering a foot injury in August. He was subsequently overtaken by João Paulo.

On 10 November 2020, it was announced that Vladimir and a further six first team players tested positive for COVID-19. On 29 June 2021, after being a third-choice behind João Paulo and John, he rescinded with Santos on a mutual agreement.

=== Return to Avaí ===
On 2 July 2021, Vladimir returned to Avaí, with the club now in the Série B. The following 13 January, despite being only a backup option to Glédson, he renewed his contract for a further year.

Vladimir started the 2022 season as a second-choice behind new signing Douglas Friedrich, but became a starter after the latter left. On 19 December of that year, he left the club after failing to agree new terms.

=== Return to Santos ===
On 28 December 2022, Vladimir returned to his first club Santos on a two-year deal. On 29 July of the following year, his contract was extended for a further year.

Vladimir was on Santos' goal during the club's 7–1 away loss to Internacional, the worst defeat of the club's history in the Campeonato Brasileiro; his performance was also heavily criticized by the media.

==== Loan to Guarani ====
On 16 January 2024, Vladimir was loaned to Guarani for the remainder of the year. A regular starter for most of the season, he suffered a third consecutive relegation. On 14 February 2025, he rescinded his contract with Santos.

== Career statistics ==
As of 14 December 2024

Club	Season	League			State League		Cup		Continental		Other		Total	
Club	Season	Division	Apps	Goals	Apps	Goals	Apps	Goals	Apps	Goals	Apps	Goals	Apps	Goals
Santos	2010	Série A	0	0	0	0	—		—		—		0	0
Santos	2011	Série A	2	0	3	0	—		—		—		5	0
Santos	2012	Série A	0	0	0	0	—		—		—		0	0
Santos	2013	Série A	1	0	0	0	—		—		—		1	0
Santos	2014	Série A	5	0	2	0	3	0	—		—		10	0
Santos	2015	Série A	11	0	10	0	4	0	—		—		25	0
Santos	2016	Série A	2	0	0	0	2	0	—		—		4	0
Santos	2017	Série A	0	0	9	0	0	0	2 (Note: Appearance(s) in Copa Libertadores)	0	—		11	0
Santos	2018	Série A	1	0	1	0	0	0	0	0	—		2	0
Santos	2020	Série A	4	0	4	0	0	0	0	0	—		8	0
Santos	2021	Série A	0	0	4	0	0	0	0	0	—		4	0
Santos	Subtotal		26	0	33	0	9	0	2	0	—		70	0
Avaí (loan)	2019	Série A	34	0	5	0	2	0	—		—		41	0
Avaí	2021	Série B	0	0	—		—		—		—		0	0
Avaí	2022	Série A	23	0	3	0	0	0	—		—		26	0
Avaí	Subtotal		23	0	3	0	0	0	—		—		26	0
Santos	2023	Série A	3	0	1	0	0	0	1 (Note: Appearance(s) in Copa Sudamericana)	0	—		5	0
Guarani (loan)	2024	Série B	23	0	7	0	—		—		—		30	0
Career total			109	0	49	0	11	0	3	0	0	0	172	0

== Honours ==
Santos

- Campeonato Paulista: 2010, 2011, 2012, 2015, 2016
- Copa do Brasil: 2010
- Copa Libertadores: 2011
- Recopa Sudamericana: 2012

Avaí

- Campeonato Catarinense: 2019
