= Neto Berola =

Brazilian footballer

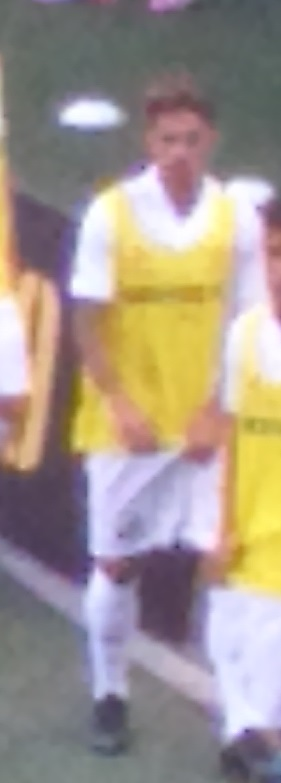
- Neto Berola warming up with Santos in 2016

Personal information
- Full name: Sosthenes José Santos Salles
- Date of birth: 18 November 1987 (age 38)
- Place of birth: Itabuna, Brazil
- Height: 1.72 m (5 ft 8 in)
- Position: Forward

Team information
- Current team: Ituano
- Number: 11

Youth career
- 2007–2008: Itabuna

Senior career*
Years	Team	Apps	(Gls)
2007	Buerarema		
2008–2009	Itabuna	14	(13)
2009–2010	Vitória	35	(5)
2010–2016	Atlético Mineiro	119	(27)
2014–2015	→ Al Wasl (loan)	4	(1)
2015–2016	→ Santos (loan)	28	(2)
2016–2017	Coritiba	38	(4)
2018	Veracruz	1	(0)
2018	CSA	12	(5)
2019–2020	América Mineiro	55	(6)
2021–2022	Confiança	28	(6)
2022–	Ituano	108	(24)
- * Club domestic league appearances and goals as of 11 November 2026

Sosthenes José Santos Salles (born 18 November 1987), known as Neto Berola, is a Brazilian footballer who plays for Ituano as a forward.

== Club career ==
Neto Berola was born in Itabuna, Bahia, and after impressing for an amateur side of Buerarema, joined Itabuna's under-20 squad in 2007. He was promoted to the main squad in the following year, appearing regularly but mainly as a substitute. 2 On 20 April 2009, after scoring 13 goals for the side in that year's Campeonato Baiano, Neto Berola moved to fellow state team Vitória. He made his Série A debut on 4 July, replacing Elkeson in a 1–2 away loss against Flamengo.

Neto Berola scored his first goal in the main category of Brazilian football on 16 August 2009, netting his team's second in a 2–3 loss at Goiás. He finished the campaign with 20 appearances and four goals, as Leão narrowly avoided relegation.

On 25 May 2010 Neto Berola signed a three-year deal with Atlético Mineiro. An undisputed starter for the side, he was sidelined for three months due to a back injury in 2012.

On 31 August 2012 Neto Berola renewed with Atlético, signing until the end of 2016. On 23 June 2014 he was loaned to Al Wasl, but returned to Brazil on 2 March of the following year after rescinding his contract early.

On 19 May 2015 Neto Berola was loaned to Santos. On 21 July of the following year, after his loan spell at Santos expired, he moved to Coritiba after rescinding his contract with Galo. On 1 January 2019 Neto Berola signed for Série B side America Mineiro on a one-year deal.

== Career statistics ==
As of 6 April 2019

Club	Season	League			State League		Cup		Continental		Other		Total	
Club	Season	Division	Apps	Goals	Apps	Goals	Apps	Goals	Apps	Goals	Apps	Goals	Apps	Goals
Itabuna	2008	Série C	10	0	6	2	—		—		—		16	2
Itabuna	2009	Baiano	—		14	13	—		—		—		14	13
Itabuna	Subtotal		10	0	20	15	—		—		—		30	15
Vitória	2009	Série A	22	4	0	0	0	0	3 (Note: All appearance(s) in Copa Sudamericana)	0	—		25	4
Vitória	2010	Série A	2	0	15	1	7	1	0	0	—		24	2
Vitória	Subtotal		24	4	15	1	7	1	3	0	—		49	6
Atlético Mineiro	2010	Série A	23	4	0	0	0	0	6	0	—		29	4
Atlético Mineiro	2011	Série A	26	4	12	8	4	1	1	0	—		42	13
Atlético Mineiro	2012	Série A	15	1	12	3	4	1	0	0	—		31	5
Atlético Mineiro	2013	Série A	22	1	2	0	2	0	1 (Note: All appearance(s) in Copa Libertadores)	0	0	0	27	1
Atlético Mineiro	2014	Série A	2	0	11	3	0	0	5	1	—		18	4
Atlético Mineiro	Subtotal		88	10	37	14	10	2	13	1	0	0	148	27
Al Wasl	2014–15	Arabian Gulf League	4	1	—		—		—		—		4	1
Santos	2015	Série A	19	1	—		4	1	—		—		23	2
Santos	2016	Série A	0	0	5	0	0	0	—		—		5	0
Santos	Subtotal		19	1	5	0	4	1	—		—		28	2
Coritiba	2016	Série A	7	1	—		—		2	0	—		9	1
Coritiba	2017	Série A	15	1	12	2	2	0	—		—		29	3
Coritiba	Subtotal		22	2	12	2	2	0	2	0	—		38	4
Veracruz	2017–18	Liga MX	0	0	—		1	0	—		—		1	0
CSA	2018	Série B	12	5	—		—		—		—		12	5
América Mineiro	2019	Série B	0	0	10	3	2	0	—		—		12	3
Career total			179	23	99	35	26	4	18	1	0	0	322	63

== Honours ==
Vitória

- Campeonato Baiano: 2010

Atlético Mineiro

- Campeonato Mineiro: 2012, 2013
- Copa Libertadores: 2013

Santos

- Campeonato Paulista: 2016
