= Werley =

Brazilian footballer

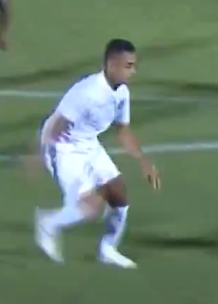
- Werley playing for Santos in 2015

Personal information
- Full name: Werley Ananias da Silva
- Date of birth: 5 September 1988 (age 38)
- Place of birth: Oliveira, Brazil
- Height: 1.84 m (6 ft 0 in)
- Position: Centre back

Youth career
- 1997–2002: Social
- 2002–2008: Atlético Mineiro

Senior career*
Years	Team	Apps	(Gls)
2008–2012	Atlético Mineiro	125	(2)
2008	→ America-RJ (loan)	7	(0)
2008	→ Boavista (loan)	11	(1)
2012	→ Grêmio (loan)	38	(6)
2013–2016	Grêmio	129	(15)
2015	→ Santos (loan)	44	(3)
2016	→ Figueirense (loan)	26	(0)
2017–2018	Coritiba	41	(6)
2018–2021	Vasco da Gama	71	(2)
2021	Atlético Goianiense	1	(0)
2022	CSA	24	(0)
- * Club domestic league appearances and goals as of 17 September 2022

Werley Ananias da Silva (born 9 September 1988), simply known as Werley, is a Brazilian former professional footballer who played as a centre-back.

== Club career ==
Werley was born in Oliveira, Minas Gerais, and joined Atlético Mineiro's youth setup in 2002, aged 14, after starting it out at Social. He made his senior debuts while on loan at América-RJ, appearing sparingly in 2008 Campeonato Carioca.

After a loan stint at fellow Rio de Janeiro's club Boavista, Werley was definitely promoted to the main squad by manager Emerson Leão. He made his first team debut on 15 February 2009, coming on as a second half substitute for Marcos Rocha in a 1–2 away loss against fierce rivals Cruzeiro for the Campeonato Mineiro championship.

Werley made his Série A debut on 9 May, starting in a 2–2 away draw against Avaí. He scored his first goal on 6 October 2010, netting his side's first in a 2–1 home win against Corinthians.

On 1 March 2012 Werley was loaned to Grêmio, until December. On 29 June, after being a regular starter, he definitely joined the club, after being involved in Victor's transfer to Atlético. He was a regular starter during the following campaigns, but lost his starting spot after the arrival of Pedro Geromel in 2014.

On 18 January 2015 Werley moved to Santos, in a season-long loan deal. A starter during the whole Campeonato Paulista, he lost his starting spot in August, being overtaken by Gustavo Henrique.

On 23 December 2016 Werley moved to Coritiba.

== Personal life ==
Werley's younger brother Nathan is also a centre back and was groomed at Atlético as well.

== Career statistics ==
As of 1 November 2023

Club	Season	League			State League		National Cup		Continental		Other		Total	
Club	Season	Division	Apps	Goals	Apps	Goals	Apps	Goals	Apps	Goals	Apps	Goals	Apps	Goals
América-RJ	2008	Carioca	—		7	0	—		—		—		7	0
Boavista-RJ	2008	Série C	11	1	—		—		—		—		11	1
Atlético Mineiro	2009	Série A	32	0	11	0	2	0	0	0	—		42	0
Atlético Mineiro	2010	Série A	34	1	14	0	5	0	4 (Note: Appearance(s) in Copa Sudamericana)	0	—		57	1
Atlético Mineiro	2011	Série A	14	1	7	0	2	0	0	0	—		23	1
Atlético Mineiro	2012	Série A	0	0	0	0	0	0	0	0	—		0	0
Atlético Mineiro	Total		80	2	32	0	9	0	4	0	—		125	2
Grêmio (loan)	2012	Série A	30	3	8	3	6	1	5	2	—		49	9
Grêmio	2013	Série A	25	1	15	2	3	1	6 (Note: Appearance(s) in Copa Libertadores)	1	—		49	5
Grêmio	2014	Série A	13	0	9	1	1	0	8	0	—		31	1
Grêmio	Total		68	4	32	6	10	2	19	3	—		129	15
Santos (loan)	2015	Série A	23	2	14	1	7	0	0	0	—		44	3
Figueirense (loan)	2016	Série A	21	0	—		3	0	2	0	—		26	0
Coritiba	2017	Série A	25	4	13	1	2	1	—		—		40	6
Vasco da Gama	2018	Série A	14	0	5	0	1	0	3	0	—		23	0
Vasco da Gama	2019	Série A	8	0	15	0	6	0	—		—		29	0
Vasco da Gama	2020	Série A	8	0	6	2	3	0	2	0	—		19	2
Vasco da Gama	Total		30	0	26	2	10	0	5	0	—		71	2
Atlético Goianiense	2021	Série A	6	0	—		—		—		—		6	0
CSA	2022	Série B	18	0	6	0	4	2	—		6 (Note: Appearance(s) in Copa do Nordeste)	1	34	3
Career total			282	13	130	10	45	5	30	3	6	1	493	32

== Honours ==
Atlético Mineiro

- Campeonato Mineiro: 2010, 2012

Santos

- Campeonato Paulista: 2015
