= Wesley (footballer, born April 1996) =

Brazilian footballer

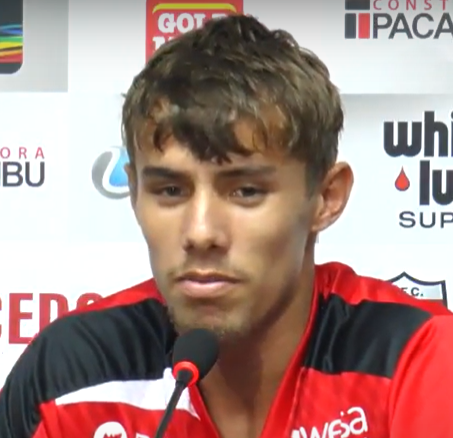
- Wesley in 2017

Personal information
- Full name: Wesley Pionteck Souza
- Date of birth: 14 April 1996 (age 30)
- Place of birth: Orlândia, Brazil
- Height: 1.75 m (5 ft 9 in)
- Position: Winger

Team information
- Current team: Itabirito

Youth career
- Batatais
- Grêmio Barueri
- Botafogo-SP

Senior career*
Years	Team	Apps	(Gls)
2014–2015	Botafogo-SP	14	(1)
2015–2019	Coimbra	0	(0)
2015–2018	→ Santos (loan)	0	(0)
2017	→ Botafogo-SP (loan)	21	(8)
2018	→ Botafogo-SP (loan)	5	(0)
2019	→ Red Bull Bragantino (loan)	45	(9)
2020–2021	Red Bull Bragantino	1	(0)
2020	→ Botafogo-SP (loan)	6	(0)
2021	→ Vitória (loan)	12	(0)
2022	Água Santa	6	(0)
2022	Sampaio Corrêa	9	(0)
2022–2023	Avenida	7	(0)
2023–	Itabirito		
- * Club domestic league appearances and goals as of 11 March 2023

Wesley Pionteck Souza (born 14 April 1996), simply known as Wesley, is a Brazilian footballer who plays for Itabirito. Mainly a winger, he can also play as a wing back.

== Club career ==
Born in Orlândia, São Paulo, Wesley graduated with Botafogo-SP's youth setup, after being a sprinter when young. He made his senior debuts in 2014, appearing in that year's Copa Paulista.

After being one of the Botafogo's best performers in the 2015 Copa São Paulo de Futebol Júnior (in which the club finished second), Wesley made his professional debut on 31 January, starting and assisting Rodrigo Andrade in a 1–0 away win against Rio Claro for the Campeonato Paulista championship. He scored his first goal on 8 February, netting his team's only in a 1–1 home draw against Ponte Preta.

Wesley finished the tournament with 14 appearances and one goal, and was linked to Flamengo, Palmeiras and Lille OSC. On 27 May, however, it was confirmed that Botafogo-SP had sold the majority of his rights to an investment group, BMG, who placed him with Santos in their Under 23 team.

During the 2017 season, Wesley had a secondary loan spell at his former club Botafogo-SP. He was the top goalscorer for the side during the 2017 Série C. As a result he signed a further loan agreement for the 2018 season with the club.

In December he agreed a contract with Bragantino for the 2019 season. He became part of the Red Bull Bragantino squad when CA Bragantino merged with Red Bull Brasil in April 2019.

== Career statistics ==
As of 17 December 2021

Club	Season	League			State League		Cup		Continental		Other		Total	
Club	Season	Division	Apps	Goals	Apps	Goals	Apps	Goals	Apps	Goals	Apps	Goals	Apps	Goals
Botafogo-SP	2014	Paulista	—		0	0	—		—		1 (Note: All appearance(s) in Copa Paulista)	0	1	0
Botafogo-SP	2015	Série D	0	0	14	1	—		—		—		14	1
Botafogo-SP	Total		0	0	14	1	—		—		1	0	15	1
Santos	2015	Série A	0	0	—		—		—		—		0	0
Santos	2016	Série A	0	0	—		—		—		13	0	13	0
Santos	Total		0	0	—		—		—		13	0	13	0
Botafogo-SP	2017	Série C	12	6	9	2	—		—		—		21	8
Botafogo-SP	2018	Série C	0	0	5	0	—		—		—		5	0
Botafogo-SP	Total		12	6	14	2	—		—		—		26	8
Red Bull Bragantino	2019	Série B	32	5	13	4	—		—		—		45	9
Red Bull Bragantino	2020	Série A	1	0	0	0	0	0	—		—		1	0
Red Bull Bragantino	Total		33	5	13	4	0	0	—		—		46	9
Botafogo-SP (loan)	2020	Série B	6	0	—		—		—		—		6	0
Vitória (loan)	2021	Série B	9	0	3	0	0	0	—		—		12	0
Career total			60	12	44	7	0	0	0	0	14	0	118	19

== Honours ==
Bragantino

- Campeonato Brasileiro Série B: 2019
