= Chiquinho (footballer, born 1989) =

Brazilian footballer

Personal information
- Full name: Francisco Sousa dos Santos
- Date of birth: 27 July 1989 (age 37)
- Place of birth: Caxias, Brazil
- Height: 1.70 m (5 ft 7 in)
- Positions: Midfielder; left back

Team information
- Current team: Santa Cruz

Youth career
- CFZ-DF
- América Mineiro
- Brasiliense
- 2004–2009: Atlético Mineiro

Senior career*
Years	Team	Apps	(Gls)
2009–2012	Atlético Mineiro	11	(1)
2010	→ Tupi (loan)	10	(3)
2010–2011	→ Ipatinga (loan)	41	(4)
2012	→ Nova Iguaçu (loan)	17	(0)
2012	Ipatinga	14	(3)
2012	Corinthians	3	(0)
2013	Ponte Preta	55	(6)
2014	Fluminense	46	(1)
2015	Santos	24	(1)
2016	Flamengo	16	(0)
2017	Shonan Bellmare	2	(0)
2017	Oita Trinita	16	(0)
2018	São Caetano	12	(2)
2018	Coritiba	23	(2)
2019	Meizhou Hakka	3	(0)
2019	Vitória	19	(1)
2020–2021	Santa Cruz	15	(8)
2021–2022	Dibba		
2022–	Santa Cruz	4	(0)
- * Club domestic league appearances and goals as of 14:57, 30 January 2021 (UTC)

Francisco Sousa dos Santos (born 27 July 1989) is a Brazilian footballer. Mainly a left back, he can also play as a midfielder or forward. He currently plays for Santa Cruz.

== Club career ==
Born in Caxias, Maranhão, Chiquinho was spotted by Atlético Mineiro's youth setup in 2004, aged 15. He made his first team – and Série A – debut on 21 June 2009, starting in a 3–2 away win against Santos.

However, Chiquinho was rarely used by Galo, and subsequently served loan spells at Tupi, Ipatinga and Nova Iguaçu. He was released by Atlético in May, and immediately returned to Ipatinga.

On 21 August 2012 Chiquinho signed an 18-month deal with Corinthians. He was rarely used by the club, and moved to Ponte Preta on 13 December.

Chiquinho scored his first goal in the top division on 5 June 2013, netting the first in a 3–4 home loss against Atlético Paranaense. He was also a regular during Ponte's Copa Sudamericana run, scoring one goal in eight appearances.

On 10 January 2014 Chiquinho joined Fluminense, in a one-year deal. He was a regular starter during his spell, being mostly used as a left back and overtaking longtime incumbent Carlinhos.

On 8 January 2015 Chiquinho signed for Santos, after agreeing to a one-year contract. He made his debut for the club on 1 February, starting and scoring the second in a 3–0 home win against Ituano.

On 17 January 2017 Chiquinho signed for Shonan Bellmare.

== Career statistics ==
As of 31 October 2023

Club	Season	League			State League		Cup		Continental		Other		Total	
Club	Season	Division	Apps	Goals	Apps	Goals	Apps	Goals	Apps	Goals	Apps	Goals	Apps	Goals
Atlético Mineiro	2009	Série A	1	0	8	1	—		2 (Note: All appearance(s) in Copa Sudamericana)	0	—		11	1
Tupi	2010	Série D	—		10	3	—		—		—		10	3
Ipatinga	2010	Série B	17	0	—		0	0	—		—		17	0
Ipatinga	2011	Série C	10	3	10	0	4	1	—		—		24	4
Ipatinga	Subtotal		27	3	10	0	4	1	—		—		41	4
Nova Iguaçu	2012	Carioca	—		17	0	—		—		—		17	0
Ipatinga	2012	Série B	14	3	—		—		—		—		14	3
Corinthians	2012	Série A	3	0	—		—		—		—		3	0
Ponte Preta	2013	Série A	26	1	19	4	2	0	8	1	—		55	6
Fluminense	2014	Série A	26	1	14	0	4	0	2	0	—		46	1
Santos	2015	Série A	10	0	11	1	3	0	—		—		24	1
Flamengo	2016	Série A	7	0	5	0	0	0	3	0	1 (Note: All appearance(s) in Primeira Liga)	0	16	0
Shonan Bellmare	2017	J2 League	2	0	—		—		—		—		2	0
Oita Trinita	2017	J2 League	16	0	—		—		—		—		16	0
São Caetano	2018	Paulista	—		12	2	1	0	—		—		13	2
Coritiba	2018	Série B	23	2	—		—		—		—		23	2
Meizhou Hakka	2019	China League One	3	0	—		—		—		—		3	0
Vitória	2019	Série B	19	1	—		—		—		—		19	1
Santa Cruz	2020	Série C	15	8	2	0	1	0	—		2 (Note: All appearance(s) in Copa do Nordeste)	0	20	8
Santa Cruz	2021	Série C	5	0	10	2	2	1	—		9	3	26	6
Santa Cruz	2022	Série D	4	0	—		—		—		—		4	0
Santa Cruz	2023	Série D	12	0	5	1	1	0	—		2	0	20	1
Santa Cruz	Subtotal		36	8	17	3	4	1	—		13	3	70	15
Dibba	2021–22	UAE Division 1	27	13	—		—		—		—		27	13
Ipatinga	2023	Mineiro	—		7	1	—		—		—		7	1
Career total			240	32	130	15	18	2	15	1	14	3	417	53

== Honours ==
Santos

- Campeonato Paulista: 2015
