= Lucas Otávio =

Brazilian footballer (born 1994)

Personal information
- Full name: Lucas Otávio Veiga Lopes
- Date of birth: 9 October 1994 (age 32)
- Place of birth: Cornélio Procópio, Brazil
- Height: 1.64 m (5 ft 4 1/2 in)
- Position: Defensive midfielder

Youth career
- Bandeirantes EC
- 2005–2014: Santos

Senior career*
Years	Team	Apps	(Gls)
2013–2018	Santos	27	(0)
2014	→ Paraná (loan)	20	(0)
2016	→ Paraná (loan)	17	(0)
2017	→ Avaí (loan)	13	(0)
2018	→ Ituano (loan)	0	(0)
2019	PSTC	6	(1)
Total		83	(1)
- * Club domestic league appearances and goals

Lucas Otávio Veiga Lopes (born 9 October 1994), known as Lucas Otávio, is a Brazilian retired footballer who played as a defensive midfielder.

== Club career ==
Born in Cornélio Procópio, Paraná, Lucas Otávio began his career in hometown's Bandeirantes Esporte Clube (BEC), and joined Santos FC in 2005, after impressing in a match against Peixe. In April 2012, he signed a three-year professional deal with the latter.

In July 2013, Lucas Otávio was promoted to Santos' main squad. On the 24th he made his first team debut, in a 2–0 away win against CRAC in that season's Copa do Brasil.

On 5 June 2014, Lucas Otávio was loaned to Série B side Paraná until December. A regular starter under manager Claudinei Oliveira, he eventually lost his place under Ricardinho, with his loan being cut short on 26 November due to an injury.

Lucas Otávio returned to Santos in 2015, being definitely included in the club's main squad. He made his Série A debut on 17 May, starting in a 1–0 home win against Cruzeiro.

On 29 September 2015 Lucas Otávio renewed his contract with Peixe, signing until January 2019. On 10 March of the following year, after receiving little playing time under new manager Dorival Júnior, he returned to Paraná on loan until December.

On 6 March 2017, Lucas Otávio was loaned to Avaí until the end of the season. The following 12 January, he joined Ituano also in a temporary deal.

Lucas Otávio left Santos in December 2018, as his contract expired, and subsequently joined PSTC. He scored his first senior goal with the latter side on 21 April 2019, netting his team's fifth in a 5–1 home routing of Nacional de Rolândia.

In May 2019, Lucas Otávio asked to leave the club for personal reasons. He subsequently retired, and became a player's agent.

== Career statistics ==
As of 27 November 2017

Club	Season	League			State League		Cup		Continental		Other		Total	
Club	Season	Division	Apps	Goals	Apps	Goals	Apps	Goals	Apps	Goals	Apps	Goals	Apps	Goals
Santos	2013	Série A	0	0	—		1	0	—		—		1	0
Santos	2014	Série A	0	0	2	0	0	0	—		—		2	0
Santos	2015	Série A	14	0	11	0	2	0	—		—		27	0
Santos	Subtotal		14	0	13	0	3	0	—		—		30	0
Paraná (loan)	2014	Série B	20	0	—		—		—		—		20	0
Paraná (loan)	2016	Série B	13	0	4	0	3	0	—		—		20	0
Avaí (loan)	2017	Série A	9	0	4	0	—		—		0	0	13	0
Ituano (loan)	2018	Paulista	—		0	0	0	0	—		—		0	0
PSTC	2019	Paranaense Série Prata	—		6	1	—		—		—		6	1
Career total			56	0	27	1	6	0	0	0	0	0	89	1

== Honours ==
Santos

- Campeonato Paulista: 2015
