= Fabiano (footballer, born 1983) =

Brazilian footballer

Personal information
- Full name: Francisco Fabiano Pereira Marciano
- Date of birth: 28 April 1983 (age 43)
- Place of birth: Currais Novos, Brazil
- Height: 1.80 m (5 ft 11 in)
- Position: Defender

Team information
- Current team: ASA

Senior career*
Years	Team	Apps	(Gls)
2003–2005	ABC		
2006	Porto–PE		
2006	Sousa		
2007	Pirambu		
2007	ABC		
2007	Sousa		
2008–2009	ABC		
2010	América–RN		
2010–2011	Alecrim		
2011	Sousa		
2012–2013	ASA		
2014–2015	Maringá		
2015	Foz do Iguaçu		
2016	Nacional–AM		
2016–	ASA		
- * Club domestic league appearances and goals as of 19 January 2017

Francisco Fabiano Pereira Marciano (born April 28, 1983), known as Fabiano Pereira or Fabiano, is a Brazilian footballer who plays as defender for ASA.

== Career statistics ==
As of 19 January 2017

Club	Season	League			State League		Cup		Conmebol		Other		Total	
Club	Season	Division	Apps	Goals	Apps	Goals	Apps	Goals	Apps	Goals	Apps	Goals	Apps	Goals
ABC	2009	Série B	19	0	—		—		—		—		19	0
América–RN	2010	Série B	2	0	—		1	0	—		—		3	0
Alecrim	2010	Série C	8	0	—		—		—		—		8	0
Alecrim	2011	Série D	6	0	—		—		—		—		6	0
Alecrim	Subtotal		14	0	—		—		—		—		14	0
ASA	2012	Série B	32	1	—		3	0	—		—		35	1
ASA	2013	Série B	23	0	—		3	0	—		8	0	34	0
ASA	Subtotal		55	1	—		6	0	—		8	0	69	1
Maringá	2014	Série D	6	0	15	2	—		—		—		21	2
Maringá	2015	Paranaense	—		11	0	4	1	—		—		15	1
Maringá	Subtotal		6	0	26	2	4	1	—		—		36	3
Foz do Iguaçu	2015	Série D	3	1	—		—		—		—		3	1
Nacional–AM	2016	Série D	—		—		1	0	—		4	0	5	0
ASA	2016	Série C	3	0	—		—		—		—		3	0
Career total			102	2	26	2	12	1	0	0	12	0	152	5
