= Silvio (footballer, born April 1988) =

Brazilian footballer

Personal information
- Full name: Silvio Henderson Santos de Freitas
- Date of birth: 10 April 1988 (age 38)
- Place of birth: Aracajú, Brazil
- Height: 1.80 m (5 ft 11 in)
- Positions: Defender; midfielder

Team information
- Current team: São Luiz

Senior career*
Years	Team	Apps	(Gls)
2008	Iraty		
2009	Londrina		
2010–2011	Iraty	7	(0)
2011	Londrina	0	(0)
2011	Paraná	8	(0)
2012	Londrina	0	(0)
2012	→ Bragantino (loan)	5	(0)
2012	Ipatinga	15	(1)
2013–2019	Londrina	77	(3)
2020–	São Luiz	0	(0)
- * Club domestic league appearances and goals as of 16:21, 15 May 2020 (UTC)

Silvio Henderson Santos de Freitas (born April 10, 1988), known as Silvio, is a Brazilian footballer who plays as defender or midfielder for Esporte Clube São Luiz.

== Career statistics ==
As of 26 January 2017

Club	Season	League			State League		Cup		Conmebol		Other		Total	
Club	Season	Division	Apps	Goals	Apps	Goals	Apps	Goals	Apps	Goals	Apps	Goals	Apps	Goals
Iraty	2010	Série D	7	0	—		—		—		—		7	0
Iraty	2011	Paranaense	—		17	2	2	1	—		—		19	3
Iraty	Subtotal		7	0	17	2	2	1	—		—		26	3
Paraná	2011	Série B	8	0	—		—		—		—		8	0
Londrina	2012	Paranaense	—		18	0	—		—		—		18	0
Bragantino	2012	Série B	5	1	—		—		—		—		5	1
Ipatinga	2012	Série B	15	0	—		—		—		—		15	0
Londrina	2013	Série D	7	0	17	0	—		—		—		24	0
Londrina	2014	Série D	12	1	12	0	5	0	—		—		29	1
Londrina	2015	Série C	22	1	16	1	2	0	—		—		40	2
Londrina	2016	Série B	7	0	13	2	2	0	—		—		22	2
Londrina	Subtotal		48	2	58	3	9	0	—		—		115	5
Career total			83	3	93	5	11	1	0	0	0	0	187	9
