= Wilson Júnior (footballer, born 1991) =

Brazilian footballer (born 1991)

Personal information
- Full name: Wilson dos Santos Vieira Júnior
- Date of birth: April 25, 1991 (age 35)
- Place of birth: Solânea, Paraíba, Brazil
- Height: 1.77 m (5 ft 9 1/2 in)
- Position: Striker

Youth career
- –2009: Cruzeiro
- 2009–2010: Bahia

Senior career*
Years	Team	Apps	(Gls)
2009–	Bahia	2	(0)
2011	→ Coritiba (loan)	0	(0)
2012	→ Portuguesa (loan)	0	(0)
2012–	→ Jacuipense (loan)		
- * Club domestic league appearances and goals as of October 16, 2010 ‡ National team caps and goals as of October 16, 2010

Wilson Vieira dos Santos Júnior (born 25 April 1991 in João Pessoa), better known as Wilson Junior, is a Brazilian footballer who acts as a striker for Boa Esporte Clube.
