= Jeferson Paulista =

Brazilian footballer

Personal information
- Full name: Jeferson Anti Filho
- Date of birth: 27 March 1992 (age 34)
- Place of birth: Piracicaba, Brazil
- Height: 1.75 m (5 ft 9 in)
- Position: Midfielder

Youth career
- 2005–2010: São Paulo

Senior career*
Years	Team	Apps	(Gls)
2011–2015	Botafogo	9	(0)
2014	→ Oeste (loan)	18	(2)
2015	→ Rio Claro (loan)	11	(0)
2015	→ ABC (loan)	4	(0)
2016	Rio Branco	14	(0)
2016	Itaboraí	10	(1)
2016–2017	Gama	7	(1)
2018	Rio Preto	27	(2)
2019	Juventus Jaraguá	6	(1)
2020	Nova Iguaçu	4	(1)
2020	Costa Rica EC	4	(0)
2020	Atlético de Três Corações	4	(0)
- * Club domestic league appearances and goals as of 19:43, 24 April 2021 (UTC)

Jeferson Anti Filho (born March 27, 1992, in Piracicaba), known as Jeferson Paulista, is a Brazilian footballer who plays as a midfielder.

== Career statistics ==
As of 24 January 2017

Club	Season	League			State League		Cup		Conmebol		Other		Total	
Club	Season	Division	Apps	Goals	Apps	Goals	Apps	Goals	Apps	Goals	Apps	Goals	Apps	Goals
Botafogo	2011	Série A	—		1	0	—		—		—		1	0
Botafogo	2012	Série A	3	0	2	0	0	0	1	0	—		6	0
Botafogo	2013	Série A	1	0	2	0	0	0	—		—		3	0
Botafogo	Subtotal		4	0	5	0	0	0	1	0	—		10	0
Oeste	2014	Série B	13	1	5	1	—		—		—		18	2
Rio Claro	2015	Paulista	—		11	0	—		—		—		11	0
ABC	2015	Série B	4	0	—		—		—		—		4	0
Rio Branco	2016	Paulista A2	—		14	0	—		—		—		14	0
Itaboraí	2016	Carioca B	—		8	1	—		—		—		8	1
Gama	2016	Brasiliense	—		—		2	0	—		—		2	0
Career total			21	1	43	2	2	0	1	0	0	0	67	3
