= Rhuan (footballer, born 1991) =

Brazilian footballer

Personal information
- Full name: Rhuan Rogerio Elias Barbosa
- Date of birth: 18 December 1991 (age 34)
- Place of birth: Guaranésia, Brazil
- Height: 1.79 m (5 ft 10 in)
- Position: Defender

Team information
- Current team: Maringá

Youth career
- 2010: Londrina
- 2011: Cruzeiro

Senior career*
Years	Team	Apps	(Gls)
2012	Luverdense		
2013	Junior Team		
2014	Coritiba		
2015	Maringá		
2015	Londrina	12	(0)
2016	Vila Nova		
2016	Camboriú		
2016–	Maringá	4	(0)
- * Club domestic league appearances and goals as of 23 January 2017

Rhuan Rogerio Elias Barbosa (born 18 December 1991, in Guaranésia), simply known as Rhuan, is a Brazilian footballer who plays as defender for Santo André.

== Career statistics ==
As of 23 January 2017

Club	Season	League			State League		Cup		Conmebol		Other		Total	
Club	Season	Division	Apps	Goals	Apps	Goals	Apps	Goals	Apps	Goals	Apps	Goals	Apps	Goals
Coritiba	2014	Série A	—		5	0	—		—		—		5	0
Maringá	2015	Paranaense	—		10	1	3	1	—		—		13	2
Londrina	2015	Série C	12	0	—		—		—		—		12	0
Vila Nova	2016	Série B	—		1	0	—		—		—		1	0
Camboriú	2016	Catarinense	—		6	0	—		—		—		6	0
Maringá	2016	Série D	4	0	—		—		—		—		4	0
Career total			16	0	22	1	3	1	0	0	0	0	41	2
