= Henry Austine Ugochukwu =

Nigerian footballer

Henry Kanu
Personal information
- Full name: Henry Austine Ugochukwu
- Date of birth: May 17, 1992 (age 34)
- Place of birth: Lagos, Nigeria
- Height: 1.87 m (6 ft 2 in)
- Position: Forward

Team information
- Current team: Cascavel

Youth career
- 2007–2008: Espanyol
- 2008–2009: Hertha
- 2011: Juventus

Senior career*
Years	Team	Apps	(Gls)
2013	Alecrim		
2013	Horizonte		
2013	Central	1	(0)
2014	Guarani de Juazeiro		
2014	Icasa	8	(3)
2015	Londrina		
2015	XV de Piracicaba		
2016–	Cascavel		
- * Club domestic league appearances and goals as of 18 January 2017

Henry Austine Ugochukwu (born May 17, 1992) is a Nigerian professional football player, who plays for Cascavel as forward.

== Career statistics ==
As of 18 January 2017

Club	Season	League			State League		Cup		Conmebol		Other		Total	
Club	Season	Division	Apps	Goals	Apps	Goals	Apps	Goals	Apps	Goals	Apps	Goals	Apps	Goals
Central	2013	Série D	1	0	—		—		—		—		1	0
Guarani de Juazeiro	2014	Cearense	—		21	5	—		—		—		21	5
Icasa	2014	Série B	8	3	—		—		—		—		8	3
Londrina	2015	Série C	—		6	0	1	0	—		—		7	0
XV de Piracicaba	2015	Série C	—		—		—		—		2	0	2	0
Cascavel	2016	Paranaense	—		3	0	—		—		—		3	0
Career total			9	3	30	5	1	0	—		2	0	42	8
