= Leandrinho (footballer, born 1993) =

Brazilian footballer

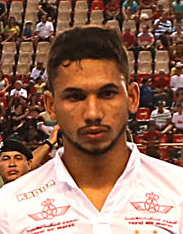
- Leandrinho with Santos in 2016

Personal information
- Full name: Leandro Cordeiro de Lima Silva
- Date of birth: 25 September 1993 (age 33)
- Place of birth: Espinosa, Brazil
- Height: 1.70 m (5 ft 7 in)
- Position: Defensive midfielder

Team information
- Current team: Emirates
- Number: 25

Youth career
- Camisa 10
- 2005–2007: São Paulo
- 2007–2010: Rio Claro
- 2010–2013: Santos

Senior career*
Years	Team	Apps	(Gls)
2012–2016	Santos	52	(0)
2016–2019	Rio Ave	20	(0)
2019–2020	Vitória FC	15	(0)
2020–2021	Avaí	13	(1)
2021–2023	Mafra	51	(0)
2023–2025	Al-Jandal	57	(1)
2025–	Emirates	0	(0)
- * Club domestic league appearances and goals as of 25 June 2023

Leandro Cordeiro de Lima Silva (born 25 September 1993), commonly known as Leandrinho, is a Brazilian footballer who plays for Emirates as a defensive midfielder.

== Club career ==
=== Santos ===
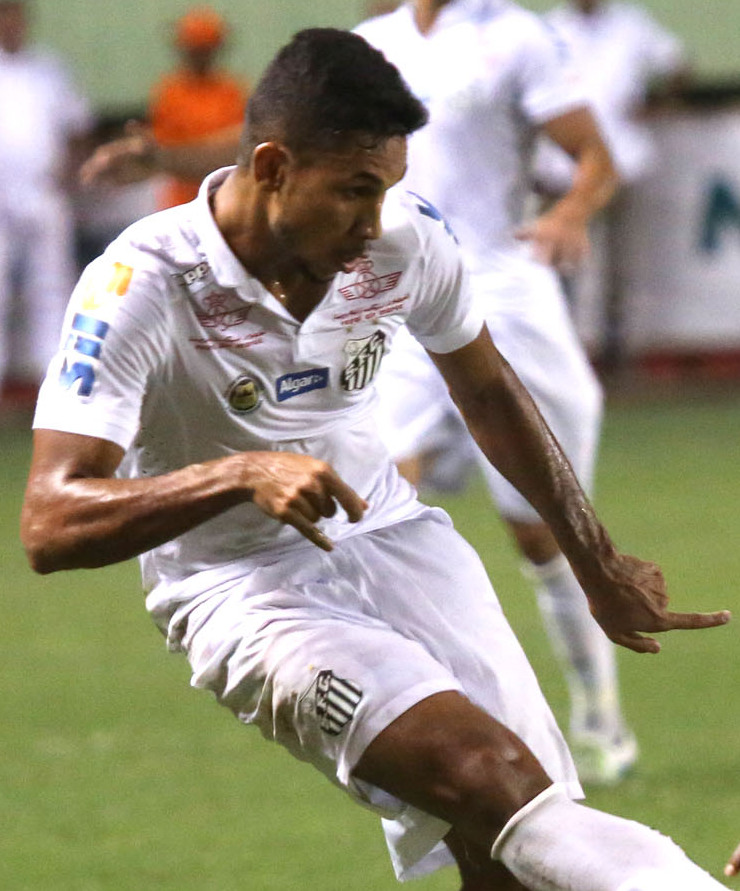
Leandrinho playing for Santos in 2016

Born in Espinosa, Minas Gerais, Leandrinho joined Santos FC's youth system in 2010, aged 16. He made his first team debut on 5 August 2012, in a 0–3 away loss against Naútico for the Série A championship.

Leandrinho was later praised by manager Muricy Ramalho due to his performances, but was demoted to the under-20s, helping the side to win the category's Campeonato Paulista. He scored his first professional goal on 10 July 2013, netting his side's only in a 1–1 home draw against CRAC, for that year's Copa do Brasil.

On 16 August 2013, after being definitely promoted to the main squad by manager Claudinei Oliveira, Leandrinho renewed his link with Santos until December 2017, being also a regular during the campaign, appearing in 21 matches. He eventually lost his space in 2014, contributing with only eight league matches.

After appearing in even less matches in 2015, Leandrinho was about to go out on loan to Oeste on 3 June 2016, until December. The move later fell through, after both parts failed to agree terms.

=== Rio Ave ===
On 8 July 2016, Leandrinho was transferred to Portuguese Primeira Liga club Rio Ave, with Santos retaining part ownership.

=== Vitória FC ===
On 2 September 2019, Leandrinho signed a three-year contract with fellow top tier side Vitória FC.

=== Mafra ===
On 17 June 2021, he returned to Portugal and signed with Mafra. On 1 July 2023, Leandrinho's contract with Mafra expired and he was released.

=== Al Jandal ===
On 10 July 2023, Leandrinho signed for Saudi First Division League side Al-Jandal.

== Personal life ==
Leandrinho is the brother of the footballer Léo Cordeiro.

== Career statistics ==
As of 4 March 2021

Club	Season	League			State League		Cup		Continental		Other		Total	
Club	Season	Division	Apps	Goals	Apps	Goals	Apps	Goals	Apps	Goals	Apps	Goals	Apps	Goals
Santos	2012	Série A	3	0	—		—		—		—		3	0
Santos	2013	Série A	21	0	—		3	1	—		—		24	1
Santos	2014	Série A	8	0	8	0	2	0	—		—		18	0
Santos	2015	Série A	6	0	6	0	4	0	—		—		16	0
Santos	2016	Série A	0	0	0	0	2	0	0	0	—		2	0
Santos	Subtotal		38	0	14	0	11	1	—		—		63	1
Rio Ave	2016–17	Primeira Liga	0	0	—		0	0	0	0	—		0	0
Rio Ave	2017–18	Primeira Liga	9	0	—		1	0	—		2 (Note: Appearance(s) in Taça da Liga)	0	12	0
Rio Ave	2018–19	Primeira Liga	11	0	—		—		2 (Note: Appearance(s) in UEFA Europa League)	0	3	0	16	0
Rio Ave	Subtotal		20	0	—		1	0	2	0	5	0	28	0
Vitória de Setúbal	2019–20	Primeira Liga	15	0	—		1	0	—		1	0	17	0
Avaí	2020	Série B	13	1	—		—		—		—		13	1
Career total			86	1	14	0	13	1	2	0	6	0	121	2

== Honours ==
Santos

- Recopa Sudamericana: 2012
- Campeonato Paulista: 2015, 2016
