= Gerônimo (footballer) =

Brazilian footballer (born 1989)

Personal information
- Full name: Gerônimo dos Santos Oliveira
- Date of birth: 1 July 1989 (age 37)
- Place of birth: Riachão do Jacuípe, Brazil
- Height: 1.73 m (5 ft 8 in)
- Position: Right back

Team information
- Current team: J. Malucelli

Youth career
- 2003–2008: Atlético Paranaense

Senior career*
Years	Team	Apps	(Gls)
2008–2010	Atlético Paranaense		
2009	→ Rio Branco (loan)		
2009	→ Metalurgi Rustavi (loan)	17	(3)
2010	→ Marília (loan)	4	(0)
2011	Duque de Caxias	0	(0)
2012	Toledo	0	(0)
2012	Ponte Preta	11	(0)
2013	Remo	0	(0)
2014	Paraná	0	(0)
2014–2015	Maringá	4	(0)
2015	Foz do Iguaçu	3	(0)
2016	J. Malucelli	0	(0)
- * Club domestic league appearances and goals as of 26 January 2017

Gerônimo dos Santos Oliveira (born July 1, 1989), known as Gerônimo, is a Brazilian footballer who plays as a right back for J. Malucelli.

== Career statistics ==
As of 26 January 2017

Club	Season	League			State League		Cup		Conmebol		Other		Total	
Club	Season	Division	Apps	Goals	Apps	Goals	Apps	Goals	Apps	Goals	Apps	Goals	Apps	Goals
Metalurgi Rustavi	2009–10	Umaglesi Liga	17	3	—		1	0	1	0	—		19	3
Atlético Paranaense	2010	Série A	—		9	0	2	0	—		—		11	0
Marília	2010	Série C	4	0	—		—		—		—		4	0
Duque de Caxias	2011	Carioca	—		5	0	—		—		—		5	0
Toledo	2012	Paranaense	—		18	1	—		—		—		18	1
Ponte Preta	2012	Série A	11	0	—		—		—		—		11	0
Remo	2013	Paraense	—		17	0	1	0	—		—		18	0
Paraná	2014	Série B	—		3	0	—		—		—		3	0
Maringá	2014	Série B	4	0	—		—		—		—		4	0
Maringá	2015	Paranaense	—		7	0	3	0	—		—		10	0
Maringá	Subtotal		4	0	7	0	3	0	—		—		14	0
Foz do Iguaçu	2015	Série D	3	0	—		—		—		—		3	0
J. Malucelli	2016	Paranaense	—		3	0	—		—		—		3	0
Career total			39	3	62	1	7	0	1	0	0	0	109	4
