= Florida, Valle del Cauca =

Florida
- Municipality and town
- Flag Coat of arms

- Florida in the Valle del Cauca Department.

- Location in Colombia
- Coordinates: 3°19′39″N 76°14′19″W
- Country: Colombia
- Department: Valle del Cauca Department

Area
  - Municipality and town: 401.6 km^{2} (155.1 sq mi)
  - Urban: 3.25 km^{2} (1.25 sq mi)

Population (2018 census)
  - Municipality and town: 53,774
  - Density: 133.9/km^{2} (346.8/sq mi)
  - Urban: 40,195
  - Urban density: 12,400/km^{2} (32,000/sq mi)
- Time zone: UTC-5 (Colombia Standard Time)

Florida (Spanish pronunciation: [floˈɾiða]) is a town and municipality located in the Department of Valle del Cauca, Colombia.

Its first inhabitants were indigenous peoples, mestizos, afro-Latinos and mulattos. Local rivers are the Fraile, Parraga, and Desbaratado. The main road is la Calle Novena ("Ninth Street").

La Hoya, a pool of water formed by a section of the Fraile River, attracts tourists.

In 2008 FARC requested this municipality together with Pradera as free areas for them to negotiate to exchange 44 hostages they held for guerilla fighters imprisoned by the Colombian government.

== Notable people ==
- Jherson Vergara, footballer
- Róbinson Zapata, football player
- Juan Camilo Angulo, Football player
- Jhon Kennedy Hurtado, football player

== Climate ==
Climate data for Florida (Cenicana), elevation 1,013 m (3,323 ft), (1981–2010)
| Month | Jan | Feb | Mar | Apr | May | Jun | Jul | Aug | Sep | Oct | Nov | Dec | Year |
|---|---|---|---|---|---|---|---|---|---|---|---|---|---|
| Mean daily maximum °C (°F) | 29.6 (85.3) | 29.9 (85.8) | 29.8 (85.6) | 29.3 (84.7) | 29.1 (84.4) | 29.4 (84.9) | 29.9 (85.8) | 30.3 (86.5) | 29.7 (85.5) | 29.1 (84.4) | 28.6 (83.5) | 29.2 (84.6) | 29.5 (85.1) |
| Daily mean °C (°F) | 23.5 (74.3) | 23.7 (74.7) | 23.8 (74.8) | 23.5 (74.3) | 23.5 (74.3) | 23.8 (74.8) | 23.8 (74.8) | 24.0 (75.2) | 23.6 (74.5) | 23.1 (73.6) | 22.9 (73.2) | 23.4 (74.1) | 23.6 (74.5) |
| Mean daily minimum °C (°F) | 18.7 (65.7) | 18.8 (65.8) | 19.0 (66.2) | 19.1 (66.4) | 19.1 (66.4) | 18.7 (65.7) | 18.3 (64.9) | 18.2 (64.8) | 18.5 (65.3) | 18.6 (65.5) | 18.6 (65.5) | 18.8 (65.8) | 18.7 (65.7) |
| Average precipitation mm (inches) | 92.1 (3.63) | 84.0 (3.31) | 121.8 (4.80) | 169.0 (6.65) | 113.7 (4.48) | 49.3 (1.94) | 29.5 (1.16) | 38.1 (1.50) | 95.4 (3.76) | 139.3 (5.48) | 158.7 (6.25) | 86.0 (3.39) | 1,176.9 (46.33) |
| Average precipitation days | 10 | 11 | 14 | 16 | 15 | 10 | 8 | 7 | 12 | 16 | 16 | 12 | 145 |
| Average relative humidity (%) | 77 | 77 | 78 | 80 | 80 | 78 | 75 | 75 | 77 | 79 | 81 | 79 | 78 |
| Mean monthly sunshine hours | 179.8 | 152.4 | 158.1 | 138.0 | 136.4 | 153.0 | 170.5 | 176.7 | 150.0 | 158.1 | 141.0 | 164.3 | 1,878.3 |
| Mean daily sunshine hours | 5.8 | 5.4 | 5.1 | 4.6 | 4.4 | 5.1 | 5.5 | 5.7 | 5.0 | 5.1 | 4.7 | 5.3 | 5.1 |
Source: Instituto de Hidrologia Meteorologia y Estudios Ambientales
