= Ipiaú =

Municipality of Bahia, Brazil

- city
- Flag Coat of arms

- Location of Ipiaú

- Location within Brazil
- Coordinates: 14°8′13″S 39°44′2″W
- Country: Brazil
- Region: Nordeste
- State: Bahia
- Founded: 1913
- Incorporated (town): 1 August 1916
- Incorporated (city): 2 December 1933

Government
  - Mayor: Maria das Graças Mendonça

Area
  - Total: 280.454 km^{2} (108.284 sq mi)

Population (2020)
  - Total: 45,922
  - Density: 166.05/km^{2} (430.1/sq mi)
- Time zone: UTC−3 (BRT)
- ZIP code: 45.570-000

Ipiaú is a city in Bahia, Brazil. The city is located at the confluence of the Contas River and the Água-Branca River (White-water River).

Ipiaú is bordered, in counterclockwise fashion, by Ibirataia and Jequié to the north, Aiquara and Jitaúna to the west, Ibirataia and Barra do Rocha to the east and Itagibá to the south.

The city is an important producer and exporter of cacao in Brazil.

It is the birthplace of notable Brazilians, such as Euclides Neto and Luiz Caldas.

== Demography ==
According to data from the Instituto Brasileiro de Geografia e Estatística (IBGE) for 2022, the municipality of Ipiaú has a population of approximately 40,706 people and covers an area of 280.45 km², resulting in a population density of about 145 inhabitants per km².

The population is distributed by age as follows: approximately 8,199 people are aged 0–14 years, 27,296 are aged 15–64 years, and 5,211 are 65 years or older. The male population is about 19,594, while females number around 21,112.
