= Yuri Lima =

Brazilian footballer (born 1994)

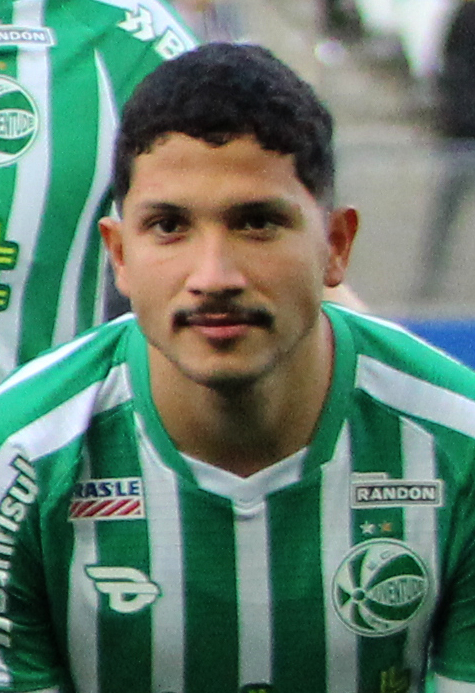
- Yuri with Juventude in 2022

Personal information
- Full name: Yuri Oliveira Lima
- Date of birth: 5 August 1994 (age 32)
- Place of birth: São Paulo, Brazil
- Height: 1.82 m (5 ft 11 1/2 in)
- Position: Defensive midfielder

Youth career
- Joerg Bruder
- 2007–2014: Audax
- 2013–2014: → Palmeiras (loan)

Senior career*
Years	Team	Apps	(Gls)
2015–2017	Audax	14	(0)
2015	→ Audax Rio (loan)	5	(0)
2016–2017	→ Santos (loan)	42	(1)
2018–2019	Santos	13	(0)
2019	→ Fluminense (loan)	25	(0)
2020–2022	Fluminense	28	(0)
2021	→ Cuiabá (loan)	21	(0)
2022	→ Juventude (loan)	24	(0)
2023–2024	→ Mirassol	38	(0)
- * Club domestic league appearances and goals as of 22:14, 6 February 2022 (UTC)

Yuri Oliveira Lima (born 5 August 1994) is a former Brazilian footballer. Mainly a defensive midfielder, he can also play a central defender.

== Club career ==
=== Audax ===
Born in São Paulo, Yuri Lima joined Grêmio Osasco Audax in 2007, when the club was still known as PAEC. After a one-year loan at Palmeiras' under-20 side, he was promoted to the first team in 2015.

Yuri Lima made his professional debut on 9 April 2015, starting in a 2–1 Campeonato Paulista away win against Bragantino. A day later, he was loaned to Audax Rio de Janeiro, a club which had the same ownership.

Returning to his parent club, Yuri was made a starter by Fernando Diniz during the 2016 campaign, as Audax reached the finals of Paulistão for the first time in their history. He contributed with 13 appearances during the tournament, as his side finished second.

=== Santos ===
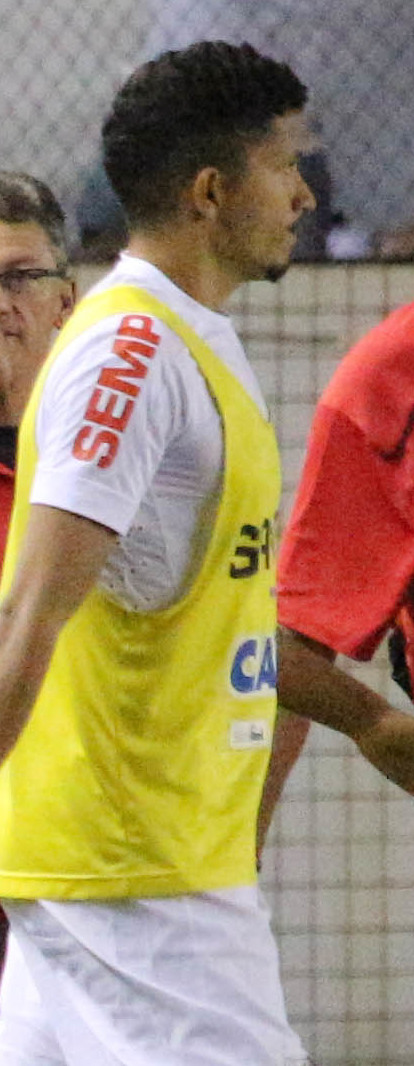
Yuri with Santos in 2017

On 13 May 2016, Yuri Lima was involved in a negotiation with Santos, being linked to a loan move to the club. He would only sign his 18-month loan deal on 7 June, after renewing with Audax until 2020.

Yuri Lima made his Série A debut on 15 June 2016, coming on as a late substitute for Caju in a 2–0 home win against Sport Recife. On 3 July he scored his first professional goal, netting the third in a 3–0 home win against Chapecoense.

Yuri Lima started the 2017 campaign as a centre back, mainly as a cover to the absences of Gustavo Henrique, Luiz Felipe and David Braz, all injured. On 27 March of that year, Santos activated the buyout clause of R$ 800,000 on his contract and signed him permanently. His new contract will start after the expiration of the loan deal.

Yuri Lima made his Copa Libertadores debut on 19 April 2017, coming on as a late substitute for Bruno Henrique in a 0–0 away draw against Independiente Santa Fe. He spent the rest of the campaign as a backup to Alison, Renato and new signing Matheus Jesus.

On 14 January 2018, Yuri Lima extended his contract with Santos until December 2020, after cutting ties with Audax. However, he was rarely used by managers Jair Ventura and Cuca during the campaign.

=== Fluminense ===
On 8 May 2019, despite featuring more regularly under new manager Jorge Sampaoli, Yuri Lima was loaned to fellow first division side Fluminense, until December. On 30 December, his agent confirmed a permanent three-year deal with Flu.

==== Cuiabá (loan) ====
On 26 May 2021, Yuri Lima was loaned to fellow top tier Cuiabá until the end of the season.

== Personal life ==
Yuri Lima's twin brother Yan is also a footballer. Also a midfielder, he too was groomed at Audax. He was the boyfriend of the famous singer Iza. The end of the relationship was announced on July 10, 2024 by Iza, after it was confirmed that Yuri had an affair.

On 13 October 2024, Iza gave birth to Nala, her first daughter with Yuri. The girl was born at the Hospital Perinatal da Glória, in the city of Rio de Janeiro.

== Career statistics ==
As of 6 February 2022

Club	Season	League			State League		Cup		Continental		Other		Total	
Club	Season	Division	Apps	Goals	Apps	Goals	Apps	Goals	Apps	Goals	Apps	Goals	Apps	Goals
Audax	2013	Paulista A2	—		0	0	—		—		1 (Note: Appearance(s) in Copa Paulista)	0	1	0
Audax	2015	Paulista	—		1	0	—		—		5	0	6	0
Audax	2016	Paulista	—		13	0	—		—		—		13	0
Audax	Subtotal		—		14	0	—		—		6	0	20	0
Audax Rio (loan)	2015	Carioca Série B	—		5	0	—		—		—		5	0
Santos	2016	Série A	22	1	—		1	0	—		—		23	1
Santos	2017	Série A	11	0	9	0	1	0	2 (Note: Appearance(s) in Copa Libertadores)	0	—		23	0
Santos	2018	Série A	6	0	0	0	2	0	—		—		8	0
Santos	2019	Série A	0	0	7	0	2	0	2 (Note: Appearance(s) in Copa Sudamericana)	0	—		11	0
Santos	Subtotal		39	1	16	0	6	0	4	0	—		65	1
Fluminense	2019	Série A	25	0	—		—		—		—		25	0
Fluminense	2020	Série A	16	0	7	0	2	0	1	0	—		26	0
Fluminense	2021	Série A	0	0	2	0	0	0	0	0	—		2	0
Fluminense	TOTAL			0	0	0	0	0	0	0	0	6	0	0
