= 2017 Santos FC season =

Santos
2017 season
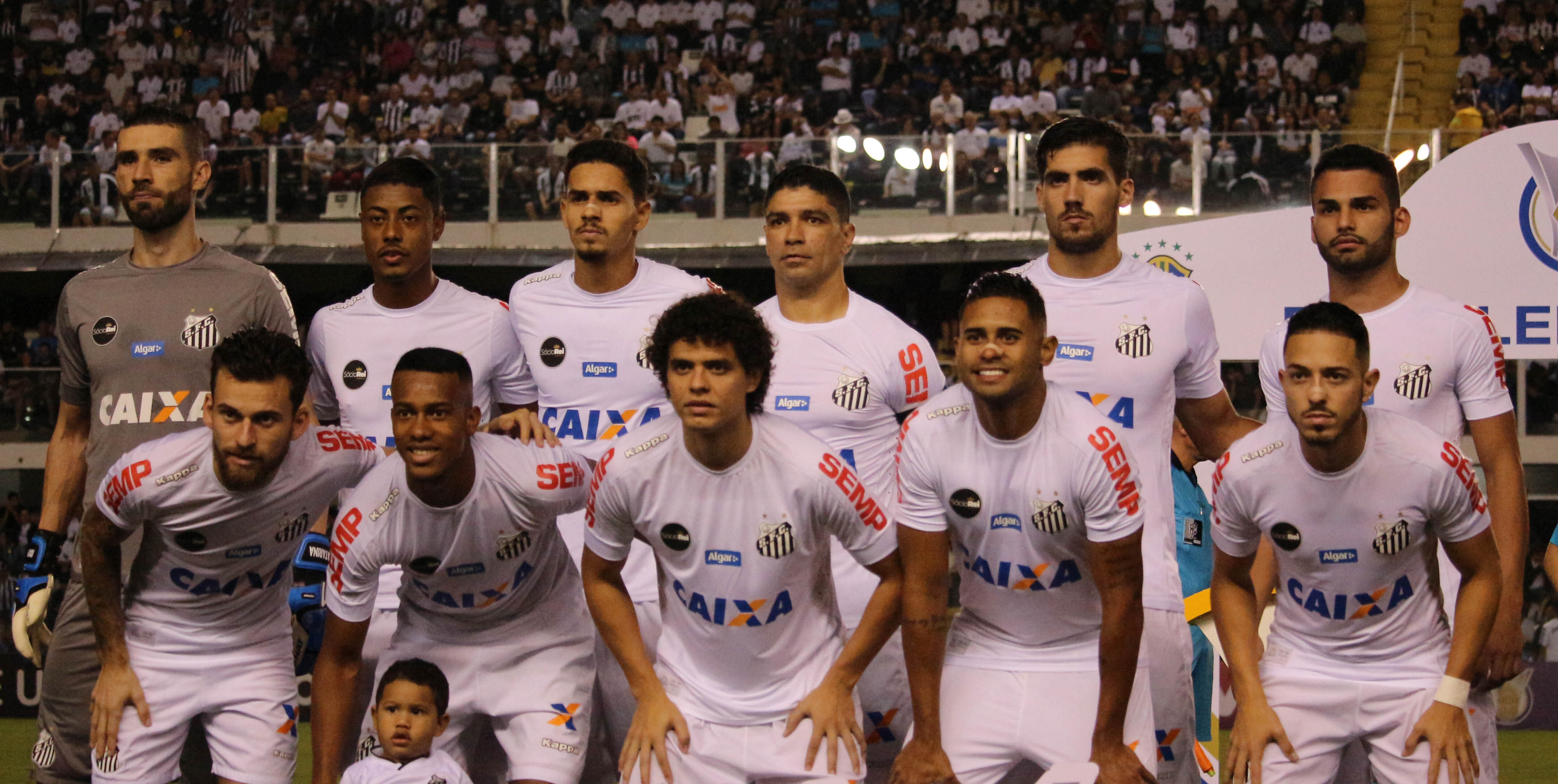
- Santos lineup before a match against Sport at the Vila Belmiro on 24 June
- President: Modesto Roma Júnior
- Coach: Elano (caretaker)
- Stadium: Vila Belmiro
- Campeonato Brasileiro: 3rd
- Campeonato Paulista: Quarter-finals
- Copa do Brasil: Quarter-finals
- Copa Libertadores: Quarter-finals
- Top goalscorer: League: Ricardo Oliveira; Bruno Henrique (8 each); All: Bruno Henrique (18 goals)
- Highest home attendance: 37,145 vs Ponte Preta (10 April)
- Lowest home attendance: 3,195 vs Novorizontino (29 March)
Home colours	Away colours	Third colours

The 2017 season is Santos Futebol Clube's 105th season in existence and the club's fifty-eighth consecutive season in the top flight of Brazilian football. As well as the Campeonato Brasileiro, the club competes in the Copa do Brasil, the Campeonato Paulista and also in Copa Libertadores.

== Players ==
=== Squad information ===
As of 6 December 2017

No.	Name	Pos.	Nat.	Place of birth	Date of birth (age)	Club caps	Club goals	Int. caps	Int. goals	Signed from	Date signed	Fee	Contract End
Goalkeepers
1	Vanderlei	GK	(Brazil)	Porecatu (Paraná (state))	1 February 1984 (aged 33)	168	0	–	–	Coritiba	23 January 2015	Undisc.	31 December 2020
12	Vladimir	GK	(Brazil)	Ipiaú (Bahia)	16 July 1989 (aged 28)	58	0	–	–	Youth System	1 January 2009	Free	31 December 2020
33	John Victor	GK	(Brazil)	Diadema (São Paulo (state))	13 February 1996 (aged 21)	1	0	–	–	Youth System	11 January 2016	Free	12 January 2021
34	João Paulo	GK	(Brazil)	Dourados (Mato Grosso do Sul)	29 June 1995 (aged 22)	3	0	–	–	Youth System	26 February 2014	Free	30 September 2021
Defenders
2	Luiz Felipe	CB	(Brazil)	Tubarão (Santa Catarina (state))	9 October 1993 (aged 24)	46	2	–	–	Paraná	17 February 2016	R$ 1M	30 September 2022
4	Victor Ferraz	RB	(Brazil)	João Pessoa (Paraíba)	14 January 1988 (aged 29)	173	6	–	–	Coritiba	18 June 2014	Free	31 December 2019
6	Gustavo Henrique	CB	(Brazil)	São Paulo (São Paulo (state))	24 March 1993 (aged 24)	124	6	–	–	Youth System	10 January 2013	Free	31 January 2020
13	Matheus Ribeiro	RB/LB	(Brazil)	Erechim (Rio Grande do Sul)	23 October 1993 (aged 24)	10	0	–	–	Atlético-GO	11 November 2016	Free	31 December 2020
14	David Braz	CB	(Brazil)	Guarulhos (São Paulo (state))	21 May 1987 (aged 30)	185	17	–	–	Flamengo	15 May 2012	Free	31 August 2019
15	Orinho	LB	(Brazil)	São Paulo (São Paulo (state))	24 May 1995 (aged 22)	2	0	–	–	Juventus	8 July 2017	Free	31 May 2019
22	Caju	LB	(Brazil)	Irecê (Bahia)	17 July 1995 (aged 22)	43	0	–	–	Youth System	21 September 2014	Free	31 December 2019
28	Lucas Veríssimo	CB	(Brazil)	Jundiaí (São Paulo (state))	2 July 1995 (aged 22)	81	1	–	–	Youth System	28 November 2015	Free	30 June 2022
32	Fabián Noguera	CB/LB	(Argentina)	Ramos Mejía	20 March 1993 (aged 24)	18	2	–	–	Banfield (Argentina)	5 July 2016	Free	30 June 2021
37	Zeca	LB/RB	(Brazil)	Paranavaí (Paraná (state))	16 May 1994 (aged 23)	141	4	–	–	Youth System	18 November 2016	Free	31 December 2020
38	Daniel Guedes	RB	(Brazil)	João Ramalho (São Paulo (state))	2 April 1994 (aged 23)	47	1	–	–	Youth System	19 February 2014	Free	30 June 2022
42	Emerson	LB	(Brazil)	Cacoal (Rondônia)	18 August 1998 (aged 19)	1	0	–	–	Youth System	1 November 2017	Free	31 October 2019
Midfielders
5	Alison	DM	(Brazil)	Cubatão (São Paulo (state))	1 March 1993 (aged 24)	115	3	–	–	Youth System	9 September 2011	Free	31 December 2022
7	Vitor Bueno	AM	(Brazil)	Monte Alto (São Paulo (state))	5 September 1994 (aged 23)	83	23	–	–	Botafogo-SP	26 May 2015	Undisc.	31 May 2020
8	Renato	DM	(Brazil)	Santa Mercedes (São Paulo (state))	15 May 1979 (aged 38)	391	31	28	0	Botafogo	9 January 2015	Free	31 December 2018
10	Lucas Lima	AM	(Brazil)	Marília (São Paulo (state))	9 July 1990 (aged 27)	203	19	14	2	Internacional	7 February 2014	R$ 5M	31 December 2017
19	Léo Cittadini	CM/AM	(Brazil)	Rio Claro (São Paulo (state))	27 February 1994 (aged 23)	56	2	–	–	Youth System	3 June 2013	Free	31 December 2018
20	Emiliano Vecchio	AM	(Argentina)	Rosario	16 November 1988 (aged 29)	25	1	–	–	Qatar SC	13 June 2016	Free	31 December 2019
21	Matheus Oliveira	AM	(Brazil)	São Paulo (São Paulo (state))	28 August 1997 (aged 20)	3	0	–	–	Youth System	10 August 2016	Free	30 April 2019
25	Yuri	DM/CB	(Brazil)	São Paulo (São Paulo (state))	5 August 1994 (aged 23)	48	1	–	–	Audax	7 June 2016	Loan	31 December 2017
30	Leandro Donizete	DM	(Brazil)	Araraquara (São Paulo (state))	18 May 1982 (aged 35)	22	0	–	–	Atlético Mineiro	28 December 2016	Free	31 December 2019
39	Jean Mota	AM/LB	(Brazil)	São Paulo (São Paulo (state))	15 October 1993 (aged 24)	69	3	–	–	Fortaleza	9 June 2016	Free	30 June 2022
41	Serginho	AM	(Brazil)	Monte Aprazível (São Paulo (state))	15 March 1995 (aged 22)	50	1	–	–	Youth System	25 January 2014	Free	31 December 2018
44	Matheus Jesus	DM	(Brazil)	Salvador (Bahia)	10 April 1997 (aged 20)	10	0	–	–	Estoril (Portugal)	18 July 2017	Loan	31 December 2018
Forwards
9	Ricardo Oliveira	ST	(Brazil)	São Paulo (São Paulo (state))	6 May 1980 (aged 37)	173	92	16	5	Free agent	12 January 2015	Free	31 December 2017
11	Kayke	ST/SS	(Brazil)	Brasília (Federal District (Brazil))	1 April 1988 (aged 29)	43	9	–	–	Y. Marinos (Japan)	8 January 2017	Loan	31 December 2017
16	Vladimir Hernández	LW/SS/AM	(Colombia)	Arauca	8 February 1989 (aged 28)	28	2	1	0	Junior (Colombia)	13 October 2016	R$3M	31 December 2021
18	Nilmar	ST	(Brazil)	Bandeirantes (Paraná (state))	14 July 1984 (aged 33)	2	0	24	9	Free agent	10 July 2017	Free	31 December 2018
23	Arthur Gomes	SS	(Brazil)	Uberlândia (Minas Gerais)	3 July 1998 (aged 19)	20	3	–	–	Youth System	2 September 2016	Free	30 December 2021
26	Thiago Ribeiro	SS/ST	(Brazil)	Pontes Gestal (São Paulo (state))	24 February 1986 (aged 31)	102	23	–	–	Cagliari (Italy)	20 July 2013	R$10.8M	31 December 2017
27	Bruno Henrique	SS	(Brazil)	Belo Horizonte (Minas Gerais)	30 December 1990 (aged 26)	53	18	–	–	VfL Wolfsburg (Germany)	23 January 2017	R$13.5M	31 January 2021
29	Yuri Alberto	ST	(Brazil)	São José dos Campos (São Paulo (state))	18 March 2001 (aged 16)	2	0	–	–	Youth System	28 July 2017	Free	31 December 2022
35	Lucas Crispim	SS/AM	(Brazil)	Brasília (Federal District (Brazil))	19 June 1994 (aged 23)	13	0	–	–	Youth System	6 January 2015	Free	31 December 2017
36	Jonathan Copete	LW/SS	(Colombia)	Cali	23 January 1988 (aged 29)	85	24	2	0	Atlético Nacional (Colombia)	23 June 2016	R$5M	30 June 2021
43	Rodrygo	SS/AM	(Brazil)	Osasco (São Paulo (state))	9 January 2001 (aged 16)	2	0	–	–	Youth System	21 July 2017	Free	31 December 2022

Source: SantosFC.com.br (for appearances and goals), Wikipedia players' articles (for international appearances and goals), FPF (for contracts)

=== Copa Libertadores squad ===
Note: Flags indicate national team as defined under FIFA eligibility rules; some limited exceptions apply. Players may hold more than one non-FIFA nationality.

No.	Pos.	Nation	Player
1	GK	BRA	Vanderlei
2	DF	BRA	Cléber Reis
3	DF	BRA	Zeca
4	DF	BRA	Victor Ferraz
5	MF	BRA	Yuri
6	DF	ARG	Fabián Noguera
7	FW	BRA	Nilmar ^{2}
8	MF	BRA	Renato
9	FW	BRA	Ricardo Oliveira
10	MF	BRA	Lucas Lima
11	FW	BRA	Kayke
12	GK	BRA	Vladimir
13	DF	BRA	Caju ^{1}
14	DF	BRA	David Braz
15	DF	BRA	Daniel Guedes

No.	Pos.	Nation	Player
16	FW	COL	Vladimir Hernández
17	MF	BRA	Rafael Longuine
18	FW	COL	Jonathan Copete
19	MF	BRA	Léo Cittadini
20	MF	BRA	Jean Mota
21	MF	ARG	Emiliano Vecchio ^{1}
22	DF	BRA	Orinho ^{2}
23	FW	BRA	Arthur Gomes
24	GK	BRA	João Paulo
25	MF	BRA	Alison ^{1}
26	FW	BRA	Thiago Ribeiro
27	FW	BRA	Bruno Henrique
28	DF	BRA	Lucas Veríssimo
29	DF	BRA	Gustavo Henrique ^{2}
30	MF	BRA	Leandro Donizete

- 1: Matheus Ribeiro, Matheus Oliveira and Yan were unregistered, with Caju, Emiliano Vecchio and Alison being registered in their places, respectively.
- 2: Vitor Bueno, Rodrigão and Thiago Maia were unregistered, with Nilmar, Orinho and Gustavo Henrique being registered in their places, respectively.

=== Appearances and goals ===
No.	Pos.	Nat	Name	Campeonato Brasileiro		Campeonato Paulista		Copa Libertadores		Copa do Brasil		Total	
No.	Pos.	Nat	Name	Apps	Goals	Apps	Goals	Apps	Goals	Apps	Goals	Apps	Goals
34	GK	(Brazil)	João Paulo	1	0	0	0	0	0	0	0	1	0
1	GK	(Brazil)	Vanderlei	37	0	5	0	8	0	4	0	54	0
12	GK	(Brazil)	Vladimir	0	0	9	0	2	0	0	0	11	0
22	DF	(Brazil)	Caju	3	0	0	0	0	0	0+1	0	4	0
38	DF	(Brazil)	Daniel Guedes	13+3	1	0	0	1+1	0	0	0	18	1
42	DF	(Brazil)	Emerson	0+1	0	0	0	0	0	0	0	1	0
13	DF	(Brazil)	Matheus Ribeiro	3+1	0	2+1	0	1	0	1	0	9	0
4	DF	(Brazil)	Victor Ferraz	23	2	12	0	9	0	4	1	48	3
37	DF	(Brazil)	Zeca	13+1	0	10+1	0	6	0	0	0	31	0
15	DF	(Brazil)	Orinho	1+1	0	0	0	0	0	0	0	2	0
31	DF	(Brazil)	Cléber Reis	0+1	0	3+2	0	2+1	0	1	0	10	0
14	DF	(Brazil)	David Braz	28	3	6	1	9	2	3	0	46	6
6	DF	(Brazil)	Gustavo Henrique	2	0	0	0	0	0	0	0	2	0
28	DF	(Brazil)	Lucas Veríssimo	34	0	12	0	9	1	4	0	59	1
2	DF	(Brazil)	Luiz Felipe	5+3	0	0	0	0	0	0	0	8	0
32	DF	(Argentina)	Noguera	6+1	0	0	0	0+2	0	0	0	9	0
5	MF	(Brazil)	Alison	20+6	2	0	0	3	0	0	0	29	2
20	MF	(Argentina)	Emiliano Vecchio	8+4	1	0	0	1+1	0	1	0	15	1
39	MF	(Brazil)	Jean Mota	25+5	1	4+1	0	2+4	0	3	0	44	1
30	MF	(Brazil)	Leandro Donizete	4+5	0	7	0	2+2	0	1+1	0	22	0
19	MF	(Brazil)	Léo Cittadini	3+4	0	3+2	0	0+2	0	0+1	0	15	0
10	MF	(Brazil)	Lucas Lima	24+1	1	8	2	8	0	4	0	45	3
44	MF	(Brazil)	Matheus Jesus	8+2	0	0	0	0	0	0	0	10	0
21	MF	(Brazil)	Matheus Oliveira	0+1	0	0+1	0	0	0	0	0	2	0
17	MF	(Brazil)	Rafael Longuine	0+4	0	2+4	2	0	0	0+1	0	11	2
8	MF	(Brazil)	Renato	22+1	0	6	0	8	1	3	0	40	1
41	MF	(Brazil)	Serginho	2+7	0	0	0	0	0	0	0	9	0
29	MF	(Brazil)	Thiago Maia	11+1	1	12	0	6	1	2	0	32	2
7	MF	(Brazil)	Vitor Bueno	7+1	0	11	4	6	3	2+1	0	28	7
25	MF	(Brazil)	Yuri	8+3	0	9	0	1+1	0	1	0	23	0
23	FW	(Brazil)	Arthur Gomes	6+5	2	0+5	1	0	0	0+1	0	17	3
27	FW	(Brazil)	Bruno Henrique	28	8	8+4	3	8+1	3	4	4	53	18
36	FW	(Colombia)	Jonathan Copete	24+5	7	8+3	2	6+3	0	2+1	3	52	12
11	FW	(Brazil)	Kayke	15+11	3	5+4	3	1+4	2	1+1	1	42	9
35	FW	(Brazil)	Lucas Crispim	0+3	0	0	0	0	0	0	0	3	0
18	FW	(Brazil)	Nilmar	0+2	0	0	0	0	0	0	0	2	0
9	FW	(Brazil)	Ricardo Oliveira	23	8	6	1	8	3	3	0	40	12
22	FW	(Brazil)	Rodrigão	0+2	0	3+3	3	0	0	0	0	8	3
43	FW	(Brazil)	Rodrygo	0+2	0	0	0	0	0	0	0	2	0
26	FW	(Brazil)	Thiago Ribeiro	5+5	0	0+7	2	1+2	0	0+2	0	22	2
16	FW	(Colombia)	Vladimir Hernández	6+8	1	2+3	0	2+4	0	0+2	0	27	1
29	FW	(Brazil)	Yuri Alberto	0+2	0	0	0	0	0	0	0	2	0

Last updated: 4 December 2017
Source: Match reports in Competitive matches, Soccerway

=== Goalscorers ===
Ran	No.	Pos	Nat	Name	Brasileirão	Paulistão	Copa Libertadores	Copa do Brasil	Total
1	27	FW	(Brazil)	Bruno Henrique	8	3	3	4	18
2	9	FW	(Brazil)	Ricardo Oliveira	8	1	3	0	12
2	36	FW	(Colombia)	Copete	7	2	0	3	12
3	11	FW	(Brazil)	Kayke	3	3	2	1	9
4	7	MF	(Brazil)	Vitor Bueno	0	4	3	0	7
5	14	DF	(Brazil)	David Braz	3	1	2	0	6
6	23	FW	(Brazil)	Arthur Gomes	2	1	0	0	3
6	10	MF	(Brazil)	Lucas Lima	1	2	0	0	3
6	22	FW	(Brazil)	Rodrigão	0	3	0	0	3
6	4	DF	(Brazil)	Victor Ferraz	2	0	0	1	3
7	5	MF	(Brazil)	Alison	2	0	0	0	2
7	17	MF	(Brazil)	Rafael Longuine	0	2	0	0	2
7	29	MF	(Brazil)	Thiago Maia	1	0	1	0	2
7	26	FW	(Brazil)	Thiago Ribeiro	0	2	0	0	2
8	38	DF	(Brazil)	Daniel Guedes	1	0	0	0	1
8	20	MF	(Argentina)	Emiliano Vecchio	1	0	0	0	1
8	16	FW	(Colombia)	Hernández	1	0	0	0	1
8	39	MF	(Brazil)	Jean Mota	1	0	0	0	1
8	28	DF	(Brazil)	Lucas Veríssimo	0	0	1	0	1
8	8	MF	(Brazil)	Renato	0	0	1	0	1
Own goals					1	0	0	0	1
Total					42	24	16	9	91

Last updated: 4 December 2017
Source: Match reports in Competitive matches

=== Disciplinary record ===
N	Nat	Pos	Name	Brasileirão			Paulista			Libertadores			Copa do Brasil			Total		
N	Nat	Pos	Name	Yellow card	(yellow card) (yellow-red card)	Red card	Yellow card	(yellow card) (yellow-red card)	Red card	Yellow card	(yellow card) (yellow-red card)	Red card	Yellow card	(yellow card) (yellow-red card)	Red card	Yellow card	(yellow card) (yellow-red card)	Red card
27	(Brazil)	FW	Bruno Henrique	6	0	1	2	0	0	3	1	1	0	0	0	11	1	2
10	(Brazil)	MF	Lucas Lima	12	0	0	1	0	0	1	0	0	1	0	0	15	0	0
14	(Brazil)	DF	David Braz	9	1	0	0	0	0	0	0	0	2	0	0	11	1	0
28	(Brazil)	DF	Lucas Veríssimo	9	0	0	2	0	0	1	0	0	2	0	0	14	0	0
38	(Brazil)	DF	Daniel Guedes	5	2	0	0	0	0	1	0	0	0	0	0	6	2	0
29	(Brazil)	MF	Thiago Maia	4	0	0	2	0	0	3	0	0	1	0	0	10	0	0
39	(Brazil)	MF	Jean Mota	5	0	0	0	0	0	1	1	0	0	0	0	6	1	0
4	(Brazil)	DF	Victor Ferraz	3	0	0	1	0	0	1	0	0	2	0	0	7	0	0
25	(Brazil)	MF	Yuri	4	0	0	3	0	0	0	0	0	0	0	0	7	0	0
31	(Brazil)	DF	Cléber Reis	0	0	0	1	1	0	1	0	0	1	0	0	3	1	0
5	(Brazil)	MF	Alison	6	0	0	0	0	0	0	0	0	0	0	0	6	0	0
36	(Colombia)	FW	Jonathan Copete	4	0	0	1	0	0	0	0	0	0	0	0	5	0	0
1	(Brazil)	GK	Vanderlei	2	0	0	0	0	0	2	0	0	0	0	0	4	0	0
30	(Brazil)	MF	Leandro Donizete	3	0	0	1	0	0	0	0	0	0	0	0	4	0	0
9	(Brazil)	FW	Ricardo Oliveira	3	0	0	0	0	0	1	0	0	0	0	0	4	0	0
44	(Brazil)	MF	Matheus Jesus	4	0	0	0	0	0	0	0	0	0	0	0	4	0	0
7	(Brazil)	MF	Vitor Bueno	2	0	0	1	0	0	0	0	0	0	0	0	3	0	0
37	(Brazil)	DF	Zeca	2	0	0	1	0	0	0	0	0	0	0	0	3	0	0
20	(Argentina)	MF	Emiliano Vecchio	3	0	0	0	0	0	0	0	0	0	0	0	3	0	0
19	(Brazil)	MF	Léo Cittadini	0	0	0	2	0	0	0	0	0	0	0	0	2	0	0
26	(Brazil)	FW	Thiago Ribeiro	1	0	0	1	0	0	0	0	0	0	0	0	2	0	0
2	(Brazil)	DF	Luiz Felipe	2	0	0	0	0	0	0	0	0	0	0	0	2	0	0
41	(Brazil)	MF	Serginho	2	0	0	0	0	0	0	0	0	0	0	0	2	0	0
22	(Brazil)	FW	Rodrigão	0	0	0	1	0	0	0	0	0	0	0	0	1	0	0
12	(Brazil)	GK	Vladimir	0	0	0	1	0	0	0	0	0	0	0	0	1	0	0
16	(Colombia)	FW	Vladimir Hernández	1	0	0	0	0	0	0	0	0	0	0	0	1	0	0
17	(Brazil)	MF	Rafael Longuine	1	0	0	0	0	0	0	0	0	0	0	0	1	0	0
13	(Brazil)	DF	Matheus Ribeiro	1	0	0	0	0	0	0	0	0	0	0	0	1	0	0
11	(Brazil)	FW	Kayke	0	0	0	0	0	0	1	0	0	0	0	0	1	0	0
23	(Brazil)	FW	Arthur Gomes	1	0	0	0	0	0	0	0	0	0	0	0	1	0	0
21	(Brazil)	MF	Matheus Oliveira	1	0	0	0	0	0	0	0	0	0	0	0	1	0	0
42	(Brazil)	DF	Emerson	1	0	0	0	0	0	0	0	0	0	0	0	1	0	0
TOTALS				97	3	1	21	1	0	16	2	1	9	0	0	143	6	2

As of 4 December 2017
Source: Campeonato Paulista (yellow card) = Number of bookings; (yellow card) (yellow-red card) = Number of sending offs after a second yellow card; (red card) = Number of sending offs by a direct red card.

=== National team call-ups ===
N	Nat	Pos	Player	National team	Competition	Date
10	(Brazil)	MF	Lucas Lima	Brazil	Friendly against Colombia	25 January
36	(Colombia)	FW	Copete	Colombia	Friendly against Brazil	25 January
–	(Colombia)	FW	Hernández	Colombia	Friendly against Brazil	25 January
10	(Brazil)	MF	Lucas Lima	Brazil	Friendlies against Argentina and Australia	9 to 13 June

=== Suspensions served ===
Date	Matches Missed	Player	Reason	Opponents Missed	Competition	Source
18 February	1	Cléber Reis	(red card) vs Ferroviária	Ituano (A)	Campeonato Paulista	
29 March	1	Yuri	3x (yellow card)	Ponte Preta (A)	Campeonato Paulista	
19 April	1	Jean Mota	(red card) vs Santa Fe	Santa Fe (H)	Copa Libertadores	
4 May	1	Thiago Maia	3x (yellow card)	The Strongest (A)	Copa Libertadores	
17 May	1	Bruno Henrique	(red card) vs The Strongest	Sporting Cristal (H)	Copa Libertadores	
4 June	1	Bruno Henrique	(red card) vs Corinthians	Botafogo (H)	Campeonato Brasileiro	
11 June	1	Daniel Guedes	(red card) vs Atlético Paranaense	Palmeiras (H)	Campeonato Brasileiro	
17 June	1	Thiago Maia	3x (yellow card)	Vitória (A)	Campeonato Brasileiro	
21 June	1	David Braz	3x (yellow card)	Sport (H)	Campeonato Brasileiro	
9 July	1	Copete	3x (yellow card)	Atlético Mineiro (A)	Campeonato Brasileiro	
9 July	1	Lucas Lima	3x (yellow card)	Atlético Mineiro (A)	Campeonato Brasileiro	
16 July	1	Daniel Guedes	(red card) vs Vasco da Gama	Chapecoense (H)	Campeonato Brasileiro	
16 July	1	Bruno Henrique	3x (yellow card)	Chapecoense (H)	Campeonato Brasileiro	
19 July	1	Lucas Veríssimo	3x (yellow card)	Bahia (H)	Campeonato Brasileiro	
2 August	1	Yuri	3x (yellow card)	Avaí (A)	Campeonato Brasileiro	
2 August	1	Lucas Lima	3x (yellow card)	Avaí (A)	Campeonato Brasileiro	
2 August	1	David Braz	(red card) vs Flamengo	Avaí (A)	Campeonato Brasileiro	
27 August	1	David Braz	3x (yellow card)	Corinthians (H)	Campeonato Brasileiro	
10 September	1	Lucas Veríssimo	3x (yellow card)	Botafogo (A)	Campeonato Brasileiro	
10 September	1	Victor Ferraz	3x (yellow card)	Botafogo (A)	Campeonato Brasileiro	
10 September	1	Lucas Lima	3x (yellow card)	Botafogo (A)	Campeonato Brasileiro	
16 September	1	Leandro Donizete	3x (yellow card)	Atlético Paranaense (H)	Campeonato Brasileiro	
16 October	1	Alison	3x (yellow card)	Sport (A)	Campeonato Brasileiro	
19 October	1	Vecchio	3x (yellow card)	Atlético Goianiense (H)	Campeonato Brasileiro	
28 October	1	Matheus Jesus	3x (yellow card)	Atlético Mineiro (H)	Campeonato Brasileiro	
28 October	1	Jean Mota	3x (yellow card)	Atlético Mineiro (H)	Campeonato Brasileiro	
4 November	1	Daniel Guedes	3x (yellow card)	Vasco da Gama (H)	Campeonato Brasileiro	
8 November	1	Bruno Henrique	3x (yellow card)	Chapecoense (A)	Campeonato Brasileiro	
16 November	1	Lucas Lima	3x (yellow card)	Grêmio (H)	Campeonato Brasileiro	
19 November	1	Lucas Veríssimo	3x (yellow card)	Flamengo (A)	Campeonato Brasileiro	
26 November	1	Ricardo Oliveira	3x (yellow card)	Avaí (H)	Campeonato Brasileiro	
26 November	1	Alison	3x (yellow card)	Avaí (H)	Campeonato Brasileiro	

=== Injuries ===
Date	Pos.	Name	Injury	Note	Recovery time
24 September 2016	DF	(Brazil) Gustavo Henrique	Sprained knee	Match against Sport	10 months
29 October 2016	DF	(Brazil) Luiz Felipe	Sprained knee	Match against Palmeiras	10 months
11 January	FW	(Brazil) Ricardo Oliveira	Mumps		1 month
23 January	DF	(Brazil) David Braz	Calf injury	During training	1 month
27 January	GK	(Brazil) Vladimir	Bursitis		2 weeks
7 February	MF	(Brazil) Renato	Calf stretch	During training	1 month
10 February	GK	(Brazil) Vanderlei	Finger fracture	During training	6 weeks
15 February	MF	(Brazil) Lucas Lima	Knee injury	Match against São Paulo	3 weeks
19 February	MF	(Brazil) Jean Mota	Knee injury	During training	5 days
19 February	LB	(Brazil) Caju	Thigh injury	During training	4 months
21 February	MF	(Brazil) Léo Cittadini	Knee injury	Match against Ituano	1 month
25 February	FW	(Brazil) Ricardo Oliveira	Cut on the ear	Match against Botafogo–SP	1 week
9 March	DF	(Brazil) Cléber Reis	Knee injury	Match against Sporting Cristal	2 weeks
21 March	FW	(Colombia) Copete	Stomach problem		3 days
24 March	LB	(Brazil) Zeca	Thigh swelling		2 weeks
28 March	FW	(Brazil) Rodrigão	Foot inflammation		1 week
12 April	LB	(Brazil) Zeca	Knee surgery		5 weeks
8 May	DF	(Brazil) David Braz	Thigh stretch	During training	10 days
8 May	FW	(Colombia) Copete	Thigh swelling	During training	1 week
20 May	MF	(Brazil) Lucas Lima	Thigh stretch	Match against Coritiba	3 weeks
28 May	LB	(Brazil) Zeca	Calf injury	Match against Cruzeiro	2 months
2 June	FW	(Brazil) Ricardo Oliveira	Ankle injury	Match against Corinthians	3 weeks
10 June	MF	(Brazil) Léo Cittadini	Stomach problem		3 days
10 June	FW	(Brazil) Rodrigão	Knee injury		10 days
10 June	RB	(Brazil) Victor Ferraz	Sore throat		3 days
13 June	DF	(Brazil) Cléber Reis	Calf injury		20 days
16 June	MF	(Brazil) Yuri	Hip injury		2 weeks
16 June	GK	(Brazil) Vladimir	Flu		4 days
21 June	MF	(Brazil) Lucas Lima	Flu		2 days
23 June	FW	(Brazil) Ricardo Oliveira	Flu		1 month
27 June	FW	(Brazil) Rodrigão	Tonsillitis		2 weeks
27 June	MF	(Brazil) Thiago Maia	Viral disease		2 days
1 July	MF	(Brazil) Vitor Bueno	Sprained knee	Match against Atlético Goianiense	8 months
1 July	LB	(Brazil) Caju	Foot stretch	Match against Atlético Goianiense	4 months
8 July	FW	(Brazil) Bruno Henrique	Foot injury	During training	3 days
9 July	MF	(Brazil) Renato	Thigh stretch	Match against São Paulo	3 weeks
9 July	RB	(Brazil) Victor Ferraz	Knee injury	Match against São Paulo	2 weeks
12 July	GK	(Brazil) Vanderlei	Hip injury	Match against Atlético Mineiro	1 week
14 July	GK	(Brazil) Vladimir	Sprained knee	During training	3 weeks
23 July	FW	(Brazil) Kayke	Thigh injury	Match against Bahia	1 week
26 July	MF	(Brazil) Vecchio	Thigh injury	Match against Flamengo	3 weeks
30 July	RB	(Brazil) Victor Ferraz	Head trauma	Match against Grêmio	1 week
6 August	MF	(Brazil) Renato	Thigh injury	Match against Avaí	3 weeks
8 September	FW	(Brazil) Nilmar	Conjunctivitis		1 week
9 September	GK	(Brazil) Vladimir	Back pains		1 week
10 September	FW	(Brazil) Copete	Thigh injury	Match against Corinthians	1 week
10 September	DF	(Brazil) Gustavo Henrique	Knee injury	Match against Corinthians	4 months
13 September	MF	(Brazil) Lucas Lima	Thigh injury	Match against Barcelona	1 month
13 September	MF	(Brazil) Renato	Thigh injury	Match against Barcelona	40 days
13 September	RB	(Brazil) Victor Ferraz	Back pains	Match against Barcelona	45 days
15 September	RB	(Brazil) Léo Cittadini	Dislocated shoulder	During training	3 months
16 September	FW	(Brazil) Nilmar	Depression		
8 October	RB	(Brazil) Matheus Ribeiro	Thigh injury	During training	2 months
12 October	FW	(Brazil) Bruno Henrique	Calf injury	Match against Ponte Preta	2 weeks
3 November	FW	(Colombia) Copete	Conjunctivitis		4 days

=== Squad number changes ===
Player	Position	Old n.	New n.	Prev. to wear	Notes	Source
(Brazil) Kayke	FW	—	18	Vitor Bueno		
(Brazil) Vitor Bueno	MF	18	7	Unassigned		
(Colombia) Vladimir Hernández	FW	—	16	(Brazil) Fernando Medeiros		
(Brazil) Matheus Ribeiro	DF	—	13	(Brazil) Igor		
(Brazil) Cléber Reis	DF	—	31	(Brazil) Arthur Gomes		
(Brazil) Léo Cittadini	MF	27	19	Unassigned		
(Brazil) Bruno Henrique	FW	—	27	(Brazil) Léo Cittadini		
(Brazil) Serginho	MF	41	40	Unassigned		
(Brazil) Arthur Gomes	FW	31	23	Unassigned		
(Brazil) Kayke	FW	18	11	Unassigned		
(Brazil) Lucas Crispim	FW	42	35	Yan		
(Brazil) Caju	DF	3	22	Matheus Jesus		
(Brazil) Matheus Jesus	MF	22	44	Unassigned		

== Managers ==
Name	Nat.	Place of birth	Date of birth (age)	Signed from	Date signed	Role	Departure	Manner	Contract End
Dorival Júnior	(Brazil)	Araraquara (São Paulo (state))	25 April 1962 (age 64)	Free agent	9 July 2015	Permanent	4 June 2017	Sacked	31 December 2017
Elano	(Brazil)	Iracemápolis (São Paulo (state))	14 June 1981 (age 45)	Staff	4 June 2017	Interim	8 June 2017 (Note: Although Culpi was named manager on 6 June, Elano was the interim manager in charge of the club in the match against Botafogo on 7 June)	Ended tenure	31 December 2017
Levir Culpi	(Brazil)	Curitiba (Paraná (state))	28 February 1953 (age 73)	Free agent	6 June 2017	Permanent	28 October 2017	Sacked	31 December 2017
Elano	(Brazil)	Iracemápolis (São Paulo (state))	14 June 1981 (age 45)	Staff	28 October 2017	Interim			31 December 2017

== Transfers ==
=== Transfers in ===
N	Pos.	Name	Age	Moving from	Fee	Source
13	RB	(Brazil) Matheus Ribeiro	23	Atlético Goianiense	Free	
16	LW	(Colombia) Vladimir Hernández	27	Junior (Colombia)	R$3M	
21	AM	(Brazil) Matheus Oliveira	19	Youth setup (Note: Definitely promoted from the youth setup.)	Free	
23	SS	(Brazil) Arthur Gomes	18	Youth setup	Free	
31	CB	(Brazil) Cléber Reis	26	Hamburg (Germany)	R$7,3M	
30	DM	(Brazil) Leandro Donizete	34	Atlético Mineiro	Free	
42	SS	(Brazil) Lucas Crispim	22	Atlético Goianiense	Free (Note: Loan return)	
41	AM	(Brazil) Serginho	21	Vitória	Free	
—	DM	(Brazil) Lucas Otávio	22	Paraná	Free	
26	SS	(Brazil) Thiago Ribeiro	31	Bahia	Free	
27	SS	(Brazil) Bruno Henrique	26	Wolfsburg (Germany)	R$13,5M	
15	CM	(Brazil) Thaciano	21	Youth setup	Free	
35	DM	(Brazil) Yan	22	Youth setup	Free	
5	DM	(Brazil) Alison	24	Red Bull Brasil	Free	
–	DM	(Brazil) Fernando Medeiros	21	Botafogo–SP	Free	
42	FW	(Brazil) Lucas Crispim	22	Ituano	Free	
41	MF	(Brazil) Serginho	22	Santo André	Free	
–	GK	(Brazil) Gabriel Gasparotto	23	Ferroviária	Free	
15	LB	(Brazil) Orinho	22	Youth setup	Free	
18	FW	(Brazil) Nilmar	32	Al-Nasr	Free	
43	AM	(Brazil) Rodrygo	16	Youth setup	Free	
29	ST	(Brazil) Yuri Alberto	16	Youth setup	Free	
42	LB	(Brazil) Emerson	19	Youth setup	Free	

=== Loans in ===
N.	P	Name	Age	Loaned from	Loan expires	Source	Fee
11	ST	(Brazil) Kayke	28	Yokohama Marinos (Japan)	December 2017		Free
22	DM	(Brazil) Matheus Jesus	20	Estoril (Portugal)	December 2018		Free

=== Transfers out ===
N.	Pos.	Name	Age	Moving to	Type	Fee	Source
26	SS	(Brazil) Paulinho	28	Flamengo	Loan return	Free	
30	ST	(Cameroon) Joel	22	Cruzeiro	Loan return	Free	
15	DM	(Colombia) Edwin Valencia	31	Atlético Nacional (Colombia)	End of contract	Free	
11	CM	(Brazil) Elano	35	—	Retired	—	
45	SS	(Brazil) Walterson	21	São Bernardo	Loan return	Free	
15	CM	(Brazil) Thaciano	22	Boa Esporte	Loan return	Free	
29	DM	(Brazil) Thiago Maia	20	Lille (France)	Transfer	R$51M (Note: Santos received R$ 31M)	
–	DF	(Brazil) Paulo Ricardo	23	Sion (Switzerland)	Transfer	Undisclosed	

=== Loans out ===
N.	P	Name	Age	Loaned to	Loan expires	Source
—	DM	(Brazil) Fernando Medeiros	20	Botafogo–SP	May 2017	
5	DM	(Brazil) Alison	23	Red Bull Brasil	May 2017	
42	FW	(Brazil) Lucas Crispim	22	Ituano	May 2017	
41	MF	(Brazil) Serginho	21	Santo André	May 2017	
—	GK	(Brazil) Gabriel Gasparotto	23	Ferroviária	May 2017	
—	MF	(Brazil) Lucas Otávio	22	Avaí	December 2017	
—	FW	(Brazil) Stéfano Yuri	22	Vila Nova	December 2017	
—	DM	(Brazil) Fernando Medeiros	21	Vila Nova	December 2017	
22	FW	(Brazil) Rodrigão	23	Bahia	December 2017	
31	DF	(Brazil) Cléber Reis	26	Coritiba	December 2017	
17	MF	(Brazil) Rafael Longuine	27	Coritiba	December 2017	

=== Contracts ===
No.	Pos.	Nat.	Name	Age	Status	Contract length	Expiry date	Source
31	SS	(Brazil)	Arthur Gomes	18	Signed	5 years	December 2021	Santos FC
1	GK	(Brazil)	Vanderlei	32	Signed	4 years	December 2020	Globo Esporte
5	DM	(Brazil)	Alison	23	Signed	1 year	June 2018	Globo Esporte
8	DM	(Brazil)	Renato	37	Signed	2 years	December 2018	Santos FC
36	LW	(Colombia)	Jonathan Copete	29	Signed	4 years	June 2021	Globo Esporte
17	AM	(Brazil)	Rafael Longuine	26	Signed	4 years	December 2020	Globo Esporte
28	DF	(Brazil)	Lucas Veríssimo	22	Signed	6 years	June 2022	Santos FC
38	RB	(Brazil)	Daniel Guedes	23	Signed	6 years	June 2022	Santos FC
39	AM	(Brazil)	Jean Mota	23	Signed	6 years	June 2022	Santos FC
12	GK	(Brazil)	Vladimir	28	Signed	3 years	December 2020	Globo Esporte
34	GK	(Brazil)	João Paulo	22	Signed	4 years	September 2021	Globo Esporte
2	DF	(Brazil)	Luiz Felipe	24	Signed	5 years	September 2022	Globo Esporte
5	DM	(Brazil)	Alison	24	Signed	4 years	December 2022	Globo Esporte

Last updated: 6 December 2017

== Pre-season and friendlies ==
29 January Pre-season friendly	Santos	5–1	(Morocco) Kénitra	São Paulo
18:30 UTC-02:00	Yuri (yellow card) 29'; Rodrigão 31'; Vitor Bueno 34', 61'; Hernández 75'; Thiago Ribeiro 82'	Report	69' Ghatas; (yellow card) 85' Dahmani	Stadium: Pacaembu; Attendance: 10,775; Referee: Luiz Flávio de Oliveira

== Competitions ==
=== Overall ===
Competition	Started round	Final position / round	First match	Last match
Campeonato Brasileiro	—	3rd	14 May	3 December
Copa do Brasil	Round of 16	Quarterfinals	26 April	26 July
Campeonato Paulista	Group stage	Quarterfinals	3 February	10 April
Copa Libertadores	Group stage	Quarterfinals	9 March	20 September

Updated to match played 4 December 2017
Source: Competitions

=== Detailed overall summary ===
	Total	Home	Away
Games played	66	33	33
Games won	33	22	11
Games drawn	17	4	13
Games lost	16	7	9
Biggest win	6–2 v Linense; 4–0 v Sporting Cristal	6–2 v Linense; 4–0 v Sporting Cristal	4–1 v São Bernardo
Biggest loss	1–3 v São Paulo; 1–3 v Bahia; 0–2 v Botafogo; 0–2 v Corinthians; 0–2 v Flamengo; 0–2 v Chapecoense	1–3 v São Paulo	1–3 v Bahia; 0–2 v Botafogo; 0–2 v Corinthians; 0–2 v Flamengo; 0–2 v Chapecoense
Clean sheets	28	17	11
Goals scored	91	55	36
Goals conceded	59	26	33
Goal difference	+32	+29	+3
Average GF per game	1.38	1.67	1.09
Average GA per game	0.89	0.79	1
Yellow cards (yellow card)	143	71	72
Red cards (red card)	8	3	5
Most appearances	Lucas Veríssimo (59)	Lucas Veríssimo (30)	Lucas Veríssimo (29); Bruno Henrique (29)
Top scorer	Bruno Henrique (18)	Ricardo Oliveira (9); Copete (9)	Bruno Henrique (10)
Worst discipline	Bruno Henrique (red card) (3) (yellow card) (11)	David Braz (red card) (1) (yellow card) (8)	Bruno Henrique (red card) (2) (yellow card) (6)
Points	116/198 (58.59%)	70/99 (70.71%)	46/99 (46.46%)
Winning rate	50%	66.67%	33.33%

Last updated: 4 December 2017
Source: Competitive matches

=== Campeonato Brasileiro ===
==== Results summary ====
Overall								Home						Away					
Pld	W	D	L	GF	GA	GD	Pts	W	D	L	GF	GA	GD	W	D	L	GF	GA	GD
38	17	12	9	42	32	+10	63	12	4	3	25	12	+13	5	8	6	17	20	−3

Last updated: 4 December 2017.
Source: Soccerway

==== Results by round ====
Round	1	2	3	4	5	6	7	8	9	10	11	12	13	14	15	16	17	18	19	20	21	22	23	24	25	26	27	28	29	30	31	32	33	34	35	36	37	38
Ground	A	H	H	A	H	A	H	H	A	H	A	H	A	A	H	H	A	H	A	H	A	A	H	A	H	A	A	H	A	H	A	H	H	A	A	H	A	H
Result	L	W	L	L	W	W	W	D	W	L	D	W	W	D	W	W	D	W	D	D	D	D	W	L	W	W	D	D	D	W	L	W	L	L	L	W	W	D
Position	14	12	15	16	12	10	5	4	3	5	5	4	3	3	3	3	3	3	3	3	3	3	3	3	2	2	2	3	4	3	3	2	3	4	4	4	4	3

Updated to match(es) played on 4 December 2017. Source: Globo Esporte
W = Win; D = Draw; L = Loss

==== League table ====
Pos	Team	Pld	W	D	L	GF	GA	GD	Pts	Qualification or relegation
1	Corinthians (C)	38	21	9	8	50	30	+20	72	Qualification for Copa Libertadores group stage
2	Palmeiras	38	19	6	13	61	45	+16	63	Qualification for Copa Libertadores group stage
3	Santos	38	17	12	9	42	32	+10	63	Qualification for Copa Libertadores group stage
4	Grêmio	38	18	8	12	55	36	+19	62	Qualification for Copa Libertadores group stage
5	Cruzeiro	38	15	12	11	47	39	+8	57	Qualification for Copa Libertadores group stage

Source: CBF
Rules for classification: 1) points; 2) wins; 3) goal difference; 4) goals scored; 5) head-to-head results; 6) least red cards received; 7) least yellow cards received; 8) draw.
(C) Champions

==== Matches ====
14 May 1	Fluminense	3–2	Santos	Rio de Janeiro
11:00 UTC-03:00	Henrique Dourado 4', 45+3' (pen.); Sornoza 58'; Léo (yellow card) 90+3'	Report	39' (yellow card) 45+3' Victor Ferraz; (yellow card) 55' Ricardo Oliveira; (yellow card) 62' Bruno Henrique; (yellow card) 69' Lucas Veríssimo; 87' Hernández; (yellow card) 90' Lucas Lima	Stadium: Maracanã; Attendance: 11,835; Referee: Wagner Reway

20 May 2	Santos	1–0	Coritiba	Santos
16:00 UTC-03:00	David Braz 8' (yellow card) 90+1'; Thiago Maia (yellow card) 22'; Leandro Donizete (yellow card) 29'; Hernández (yellow card) 50'; Rafael Longuine (yellow card) 53'; Copete (yellow card) 90+5'	Report	(yellow card) 18' Matheus Galdezani; (yellow card) 45+4' Neto Berola; (yellow card) 58' Jonas; (yellow card) 74' Getterson	Stadium: Vila Belmiro; Attendance: 5,921; Referee: Wagner do Nascimento Magalhães

28 May 3	Santos	0–1	Cruzeiro	Santos
16:00 UTC-03:00	Copete (yellow card) 52'; Victor Ferraz (yellow card) 78'	Report	(yellow card) 40' Henrique; (yellow card) 55' Léo; 83' Thiago Neves; (yellow card) 84' Hudson	Stadium: Vila Belmiro; Attendance: 7,025; Referee: Eduardo Tomaz de Aquino Valadão

3 June 4	Corinthians	2–0	Santos	São Paulo
19:00 UTC-03:00	Romero 69'; Jô 75'	Report	(yellow card) 69' Vitor Bueno; (red card) 83' Bruno Henrique	Stadium: Arena Corinthians; Attendance: 40,169; Referee: Anderson Daronco

7 June 5	Santos	1–0	Botafogo	São Paulo
21:00 UTC-03:00	Lucas Veríssimo (yellow card) 21'; Thiago Maia (yellow card) 28'; Vitor Bueno (yellow card) 41'; Victor Ferraz 90+6'; Yuri (yellow card) 90+7'	Report	(yellow card) 90+4' Arnaldo; (yellow card) 90+6' Carli	Stadium: Pacaembu; Attendance: 14,486; Referee: Jailson Macedo Freitas

11 June 6	Atlético Paranaense	0–2	Santos	Curitiba
19:00 UTC-03:00	Paulo André (yellow card) 70'	Report	27', 36' Kayke; (yellow card) 78' (yellow-red card) 85' Daniel Guedes	Stadium: Arena da Baixada; Attendance: 18,112; Referee: Marcelo de Lima Henrique

14 June 7	Santos	1–0	Palmeiras	Santos
21:45 UTC-03:00	Lucas Lima (yellow card) 41'; Kayke 51'	Report	(yellow card) 36' Juninho; (yellow card) 39' Tchê Tchê; (yellow card) 77' Willian	Stadium: Vila Belmiro; Attendance: 10,143; Referee: Wilton Pereira Sampaio

17 June 8	Santos	0–0	Ponte Preta	São Paulo
21:00 UTC-03:00	David Braz (yellow card) 22'; Thiago Maia (yellow card) 53'; Bruno Henrique (yellow card) 64'	Report	(yellow card) 64' Rodrigo; (yellow card) 67' Jeferson; (yellow card) 72' Luan Peres; (yellow card) 78' Marllon	Stadium: Pacaembu; Attendance: 19,984; Referee: Igor Junior Benevenuto

21 June 9	Vitória	0–2	Santos	Salvador
19:30 UTC-03:00	Neílton (yellow card) 61'; Geferson (yellow card) 71'	Report	34', 77' Copete; (yellow card) 86' David Braz	Stadium: Barradão; Attendance: 8,179; Referee: Heber Roberto Lopes

24 June 10	Santos	0–1	Sport	Santos
19:00 UTC-03:00		Report	81' Osvaldo; (yellow card) 90+4' Reinaldo Lenis	Stadium: Vila Belmiro; Attendance: 7,292; Referee: Rafael Traci

1 July 11	Atlético Goianiense	1–1	Santos	Goiânia
19:00 UTC-03:00	Andrigo 12'; Jorginho (yellow card) 14' (yellow-red card) 51'; Marcão (yellow card) 34'; Bruno Pacheco (yellow card) 90+1'	Report	(yellow card) 59' (goal) 69' Thiago Maia	Stadium: Olímpico; Attendance: 4,588; Referee: Claudio Francisco Lima e Silva

9 July 12	Santos	3–2	São Paulo	Santos
19:00 UTC-03:00	Copete 44', 54', 67' (yellow card) 45+1'; David Braz (yellow card) 69'; Jean Mota (yellow card) 88'; Lucas Lima (yellow card) 90+1'	Report	(yellow card) 45+1' Pratto; 75' Shaylon; 87' Arboleda; (yellow card) 90' Lucas Fernandes; (yellow card) 90+4' Júnior Tavares	Stadium: Vila Belmiro; Attendance: 10,322; Referee: Sandro Meira Ricci

12 July 13	Atlético Mineiro	0–1	Santos	Belo Horizonte
19:30 UTC-03:00		Report	(yellow card) 21' Vecchio; (yellow card) 74' (goal) 90+4' Daniel Guedes	Stadium: Independência; Attendance: 12,949; Referee: Marcelo de Lima Henrique

16 July 14	Vasco da Gama	0–0	Santos	Rio de Janeiro
16:00 UTC-03:00	Rafael Marques (yellow card) 13'; Wellington (yellow card) 32'; Thalles (yellow card) 77'; Breno (yellow card) 78'	Report	(yellow card) 35' Leandro Donizete; (yellow card) 52' Bruno Henrique; (yellow card) 56' (yellow-red card) 83' Daniel Guedes	Stadium: Engenhão; Attendance: 0 Referee: Dewson Fernando Freitas da Silva
Note: Breno was booked on the bench

19 July 15	Santos	1–0	Chapecoense	Santos
19:30 UTC-03:00	Lucas Lima (yellow card) 40'; Matheus Ribeiro (yellow card) 52'; Lucas Veríssimo (yellow card) 62'; Vecchio 61' (yellow card) 83'; Vanderlei (yellow card) 84'	Report	(yellow card) 62' Fabrício Bruno; (yellow card) 64' Lucas Mineiro	Stadium: Vila Belmiro; Attendance: 5,533; Referee: Elmo Alves Resende Cunha

23 July 16	Santos	3–0	Bahia	São Paulo
11:00 UTC-03:00	Bruno Henrique 29', 45+1', 76'; Daniel Guedes (yellow card) 66'	Report	(yellow card) 38' Eduardo	Stadium: Pacaembu; Attendance: 35,769; Referee: Wagner do Nascimento Magalhães

30 July 17	Grêmio	1–1	Santos	Porto Alegre
19:00 UTC-03:00	Edílson (yellow card) 33' (yellow-red card) 90+7'; Maicon (yellow card) 34'; Fernandinho 45+3'; Ramiro (yellow card) 90+1'; Pedro Geromel (yellow card) 90+8'	Report	(yellow card) 25' Yuri; 45' (yellow card) 90+11' David Braz; (yellow card) 72' Vanderlei; (yellow card) 90+8' Thiago Ribeiro; (yellow card) 90+10' Lucas Lima	Stadium: Arena do Grêmio; Attendance: 32,251; Referee: Braulio da Silva Machado

2 August 18	Santos	3–2	Flamengo	São Paulo
21:45 UTC-03:00	Yuri (yellow card) 40'; Lucas Lima (yellow card) 50'; Bruno Henrique 54'; Alison 85'; David Braz (yellow card) 87' (yellow-red card) 90+6'; Ricardo Oliveira 88'	Report	(yellow card) 15' (yellow-red card) 73' Rodinei; (yellow card) 39' Diego; 56' Everton Ribeiro; (yellow card) 59' Éverton; 67' Felipe Vizeu	Stadium: Pacaembu; Attendance: 27,030; Referee: Eduardo Tomaz de Aquino Valadão

6 August 19	Avaí	0–0	Santos	Florianópolis
19:00 UTC-03:00	Junior Dutra (yellow card) 45+1'; Alemão (yellow card) 57'; Judson (yellow card) 75'	Report	(yellow card) 83' Lucas Veríssimo	Stadium: Ressacada; Attendance: 5,939; Referee: Pablo dos Santos Alves

14 August 20	Santos	0–0	Fluminense	São Paulo
20:00 UTC-03:00	Alison (yellow card) 87'; Lucas Lima (yellow card) 90+1'	Report	(yellow card) 21' Henrique Dourado; (yellow card) 56' Marlon Freitas	Stadium: Pacaembu; Attendance: 22,018; Referee: André Luiz de Freitas Castro

20 August 21	Coritiba	0–0	Santos	Curitiba
19:00 UTC-03:00	Márcio (yellow card) 13'; Matheus Galdezani (yellow card) 65'; Neto Berola (yellow card) 70'	Report	(yellow card) 64' Lucas Lima	Stadium: Couto Pereira; Attendance: 9,262; Referee: Sandro Meira Ricci

27 August 22	Cruzeiro	1–1	Santos	Belo Horizonte
19:00 UTC-03:00	Rafinha 56'	Report	21' Bruno Henrique; (yellow card) 63' Lucas Veríssimo; (yellow card) 82' David Braz	Stadium: Mineirão; Attendance: 12,055; Referee: Anderson Daronco

10 September 23	Santos	2–0	Corinthians	Santos
16:00 UTC-03:00	Lucas Veríssimo (yellow card) 19'; Victor Ferraz (yellow card) 31'; Lucas Lima 58' (yellow card) 59'; Ricardo Oliveira 90+3'	Report	(yellow card) 29' Gabriel; (yellow card) 34' Romero; (yellow card) 39' Marciel; (yellow card) 84' Clayson; (yellow card) 90' Fagner	Stadium: Vila Belmiro; Attendance: 12,567; Referee: Raphael Claus

16 September 24	Botafogo	2–0	Santos	Rio de Janeiro
19:00 UTC-03:00	Rodrigo Lindoso 42'; Guilherme 45' (yellow card) 49'; Victor Luis (yellow card) 83'	Report	(yellow card) 36' Leandro Donizete; (yellow card) 73' Luiz Felipe	Stadium: Engenhão; Attendance: 5,780; Referee: Igor Junior Benevenuto

23 September 25	Santos	1–0	Atlético Paranaense	Santos
21:00 UTC-03:00	Bruno Henrique 35'; David Braz (yellow card) 42'	Report	(yellow card) 6' Lucho González	Stadium: Vila Belmiro; Attendance: 4,257; Referee: Ricardo Marques Ribeiro

30 September 26	Palmeiras	0–1	Santos	São Paulo
19:00 UTC-03:00	Luan (yellow card) 43'; Mayke (yellow card) 76'; Fernando Prass (yellow card) 90+5'	Report	(yellow card) 60' Matheus Jesus; (yellow card) 69' Jean Mota; 76' Ricardo Oliveira; (yellow card) 80' Zeca; (yellow card) 88' Alison; (yellow card) 90+3' Bruno Henrique	Stadium: Allianz Parque; Attendance: 37,527; Referee: Marcelo Aparecido Ribeiro de Souza

12 October 27	Ponte Preta	1–1	Santos	Campinas
17:00 UTC-03:00	Naldo 5' (yellow card) 28'; Fernando Bob (yellow card) 37' (yellow-red card) 85'; Luan (yellow card) 68'	Report	45+2' Ricardo Oliveira; (yellow card) 66' Lucas Lima; (yellow card) 80' Zeca	Stadium: Moisés Lucarelli; Attendance: 13,892; Referee: Raphael Claus

16 October 28	Santos	2–2	Vitória	São Paulo
20:00 UTC-02:00	David Braz (yellow card) 34'; Jean Mota 36'; Ramon 69' (o.g.); Alison (yellow card) 90+3'	Report	23' David; (yellow card) 44' Caíque Sá; (yellow card) 45+1' (goal) 65' Wallace; (yellow card) 61' Yago; (yellow card) 86' Carlos Eduardo	Stadium: Pacaembu; Attendance: 19,007; Referee: Braulio da Silva Machado

19 October 29	Sport	1–1	Santos	Recife
21:00 UTC-02:00	Wesley (yellow card) 16'; Rogério 84'	Report	4' Ricardo Oliveira; (yellow card) 49' Lucas Veríssimo; (yellow card) 54' Yuri; (yellow card) 58' Vecchio; (yellow card) 65' Copete; (yellow card) 68' Matheus Jesus	Stadium: Ilha do Retiro; Attendance: 16,377; Referee: Dewson Fernando Freitas da Silva

22 October 30	Santos	1–0	Atlético Goianiense	Santos
19:00 UTC-02:00	Ricardo Oliveira 31'; Alison (yellow card) 79'	Report	(yellow card) 75' André Castro	Stadium: Vila Belmiro; Attendance: 4,245; Referee: Pericles Bassols Pegado Cortez

28 October 31	São Paulo	2–1	Santos	São Paulo
17:00 UTC-02:00	Marcos Guilherme 17'; Cueva 22'; Jucilei (yellow card) 63'	Report	34' Alison; (yellow card) 43' Matheus Jesus; (yellow card) 48' Bruno Henrique; (yellow card) 69' Lucas Lima; (yellow card) 75' Ricardo Oliveira; (yellow card) 76' Jean Mota; (yellow card) 83' Serginho	Stadium: Pacaembu; Attendance: 40,004; Referee: Anderson Daronco

4 November 32	Santos	3–1	Atlético Mineiro	Santos
17:00 UTC-02:00	Arthur Gomes 45+1'; David Braz 61'; Daniel Guedes (yellow card) 70'; Ricardo Oliveira 80'	Report	(yellow card) 33' Otero; (yellow card) 47' Fábio Santos; 51' Fred; (yellow card) 60' Elias	Stadium: Vila Belmiro; Attendance: 11,418; Referee: Wilton Pereira Sampaio

8 November 33	Santos	1–2	Vasco da Gama	Santos
21:45 UTC-02:00	Arthur Gomes (yellow card) 39'; Ricardo Oliveira 64'; Bruno Henrique (yellow card) 90+5'	Report	(yellow card) 20' Ríos; (yellow card) 34' Paulão; (yellow card) 76' Breno; 85' Evander; (yellow card) 90+1' Wellington; 90+3' Nenê; (yellow card) 90+4' Bruno Paulista	Stadium: Vila Belmiro; Attendance: 7,841; Referee: Rafael Traci

13 November 34	Chapecoense	2–0	Santos	Chapecó
21:00 UTC-02:00	Wellington Paulista 14' (pen.); Arthur 67'	Report	(yellow card) 13' Lucas Veríssimo; (yellow card) 24' Luiz Felipe; (yellow card) 66' Serginho	Stadium: Arena Condá; Attendance: 11,301; Referee: Jailson Macedo Freitas

16 November 35	Bahia	3–1	Santos	Salvador
21:00 UTC-02:00	Mendoza 23' (pen.); Renê Júnior (yellow card) 30'; Tiago Pagnussat (yellow card) 53'; Alison 55' (o.g.); Edigar Junio 79' (pen.); Eder (yellow card) 85'	Report	17' Bruno Henrique; (yellow card) 77' Jean Mota; (yellow card) 82' Lucas Lima	Stadium: Arena Fonte Nova; Attendance: 22,896; Referee: Sandro Meira Ricci

19 November 36	Santos	1–0	Grêmio	Santos
19:00 UTC-02:00	Alison (yellow card) 18'; Copete 32'; Lucas Veríssimo (yellow card) 70'	Report	(yellow card) 25' Jael; (yellow card) 29' Kaio	Stadium: Vila Belmiro; Attendance: 4,206; Referee: Pericles Bassols Pegado Cortez

26 November 37	Flamengo	1–2	Santos	Rio de Janeiro
19:00 UTC-02:00	Lucas Paquetá 7'; Diego (yellow card) 35'; Felipe Vizeu (yellow card) 75'; Réver (yellow card) 89'	Report	(yellow card) 8' Ricardo Oliveira; 10' Bruno Henrique; (yellow card) 11' Matheus Oliveira; (yellow card) 29' Jean Mota; 74' Arthur Gomes; (yellow card) 84' Alison	Stadium: Ilha do Urubu; Attendance: 15,456; Referee: Braulio da Silva Machado
Note: Matheus Oliveira was booked on the bench

3 December 38	Santos	1–1	Avaí	Santos
UTC-02:00	Jonathan Copete 31'; Emerson (yellow card) 73'; Matheus Jesus (yellow card) 73'	Report	(yellow card) 28' Wellington Simião; 32' Pedro Castro	Stadium: Vila Belmiro; Attendance: 7,539; Referee: Wagner do Nascimento Magalhães

=== Copa do Brasil ===
==== Round of 16 ====
26 April 1st leg	Santos	2–0	Paysandu	Santos
19:30 UTC-03:00	Thiago Maia (yellow card) 24'; Bruno Henrique 49'; David Braz (yellow card) 57'; Lucas Lima (yellow card) 58'; Victor Ferraz (yellow card) 84'; Copete 89'	Report	(yellow card) 17' Rodrigo Andrade; (yellow card) 58' Bergson; (yellow card) 88' Augusto Recife	Stadium: Vila Belmiro; Attendance: 6,266; Referee: Igor Junior Benevenuto

10 May 2nd leg	Paysandu	1–3 (1–5 agg.)	Santos	Belém
21:45 UTC-03:00	Diogo Oliveira 49'	Report	26', 61' Bruno Henrique; (yellow card) 41' Cléber Reis; 79' Kayke	Stadium: Mangueirão; Attendance: 13,548; Referee: André Luiz Freitas Castro

==== Quarter-finals ====
28 June 1st leg	Flamengo	2–0	Santos	Rio de Janeiro
21:45 UTC−03:00	Éverton 26'; Márcio Araújo (yellow card) 38'; Cuéllar 87'	Report	(yellow card) 90+1' Lucas Veríssimo	Stadium: Ilha do Urubu; Attendance: 15,564; Referee: Ricardo Marques (Minas Gerais)

26 July 2nd leg	Santos	4–2 (4–4 agg.)	Flamengo	Santos
21:45 UTC−03:00	Bruno Henrique 34'; Victor Ferraz (yellow card) 45' (goal) 55'; Copete 54', 90+4'; David Braz (yellow card) 57'; Lucas Veríssimo (yellow card) 68'	Report	10' (yellow card) 14' Berrío; 46' (yellow card) 57' Guerrero; (yellow card) 57' Muralha; (yellow card) 85' Márcio Araújo	Stadium: Vila Belmiro; Attendance: 12,507; Referee: Leandro Vuaden (Rio Grande do Sul)

=== Campeonato Paulista ===
==== Results summary ====
Overall								Home						Away					
Pld	W	D	L	GF	GA	GD	Pts	W	D	L	GF	GA	GD	W	D	L	GF	GA	GD
14	8	1	5	24	14	+10	25	4	0	3	14	9	+5	4	1	2	10	5	+5

Last updated: 11 April 2017.
Source: Globo Esporte

==== Group stage ====
Pos	Team	Pld	W	D	L	GF	GA	GD	Pts	Qualification
1	Santos	12	7	1	4	23	13	+10	22	knockout stage
2	Ponte Preta	12	6	4	2	18	16	+2	22	knockout stage
3	Mirassol	12	4	3	5	17	17	0	15	
4	Audax	12	2	3	7	16	21	−5	9	

Source: Soccerway

==== Matches ====
3 February 1	Santos	6–2	Linense	Santos
21:00 UTC-02:00	Rodrigão 13', 15'; Lucas Lima 58'; Thiago Maia (yellow card) 60'; Arthur Gomes 76'; Léo Cittadini (yellow card) 89'; Vitor Bueno 90'; Thiago Ribeiro 90+3'	Report	(yellow card) 41' Zé Antônio; 54' Thiago Santos; 79' Gabrielzinho	Stadium: Vila Belmiro; Attendance: 10,567; Referee: Thiago Duarte Peixoto

12 February 2	RB Brasil	2–3	Santos	São Paulo
11:00 UTC-02:00	Misael 29'; Fillipe Soutto (yellow card) 63'; Nixon 81'	Report	16' Vitor Bueno; (yellow card) 34' Yuri; 45+2' Rodrigão; (yellow card) 47' Copete; (yellow card) 54' Lucas Veríssimo; 90+3' Kayke	Stadium: Pacaembu; Attendance: 20,412; Referee: Rafael Gomes Felix da Silva

15 February 3	Santos	1–3	São Paulo	Santos
21:45 UTC-02:00	Copete 11'; Zeca (yellow card) 36'; Rodrigão (yellow card) 58'; Bruno Henrique (yellow card) 83'	Report	(yellow card) 7' Thiago Mendes; (yellow card) 26' Neílton; 37' (pen.) (yellow card) 39' Cueva; (yellow card) 44' Cícero; 56', 73' Luiz Araújo	Stadium: Vila Belmiro; Attendance: 11,320; Referee: Vinicius Gonçalves Dias Araújo

18 February 4	Santos	0–1	Ferroviária	Santos
19:30 UTC-02:00	Cléber Reis (yellow card) 46' (yellow-red card) 68'	Report	(yellow card) 22' Patrick; (yellow card) 26' William Cordeiro; (yellow card) 65' Matheus; 74' Leandro Amaro	Stadium: Vila Belmiro; Attendance: 5,655; Referee: Flavio Rodrigues de Souza

21 February 5	Ituano	0–0	Santos	Itu
21:30 UTC-03:00	Claudinho (yellow card) 16'; Mateus (yellow card) 60'	Report	(yellow card) 56' Lucas Veríssimo; (yellow card) 80' Leandro Donizete	Stadium: Novelli Júnior; Attendance: 3,564; Referee: Luiz Flávio de Oliveira

25 February 6	Santos	2–0	Botafogo-SP	Santos
17:00 UTC-03:00	Vitor Bueno 63'; Bruno Henrique (yellow card) 75'; Rafael Longuine 90+2'	Report	(yellow card) 55' Diego Cristiano; (yellow card) 64' Fernandinho; (yellow card) 83' Fernando Medeiros	Stadium: Vila Belmiro; Attendance: 5,208; Referee: Marcelo Aparecido Ribeiro de Souza

4 March 7	Corinthians	1–0	Santos	São Paulo
18:30 UTC-03:00	Jô 47'; Gabriel (yellow card) 49'; Jádson (yellow card) 65'; Rodriguinho (yellow card) 67'; Pablo (yellow card) 81'	Report	(yellow card) 80' Vladimir	Stadium: Arena Corinthians; Attendance: 36,111; Referee: Leandro Bizzio Marinho

12 March 8	São Bernardo	1–4	Santos	São Bernardo do Campo
18:30 UTC-03:00	Marcinho (yellow card) 19'; Geandro 37'; Patrick Vieira (yellow card) 70'	Report	25', 45+2', 48' Bruno Henrique; (yellow card) 43' Yuri; 76' Rafael Longuine	Stadium: Primeiro de Maio; Attendance: 5,702; Referee: Vinicius Furlan

19 March 9	Santos	1–2	Palmeiras	Santos
18:30 UTC-03:00	Ricardo Oliveira 75'	Report	(yellow card) 18' Felipe Melo; (yellow card) 53' (goal) 86' Jean; 88' Willian	Stadium: Vila Belmiro; Attendance: 8,742; Referee: Flavio Rodrigues de Souza

22 March 10	São Bento	0–2	Santos	Sorocaba
19:30 UTC-03:00	Giovanni (yellow card) 54'; Bebeto (red card) 62'; Régis (yellow card) 88'	Report	51' Vitor Bueno; 59' (yellow card) 76' Lucas Lima	Stadium: Walter Ribeiro; Attendance: 6,690; Referee: Marcelo Aparecido Ribeiro de Souza

25 March 11	Santo André	0–1	Santos	Santo André
15:00 UTC-03:00	Tiago Ulisses (yellow card) 5' (yellow-red card) 90'	Report	75' Copete	Stadium: Bruno José Daniel; Attendance: 9,286; Referee: Vinicius Gonçalves Dias Araújo

29 March 12	Santos	3–1	Novorizontino	Santos
21:45 UTC-03:00	Kayke 36' (pen.), 59'; Léo Cittadini (yellow card) 40'; Yuri (yellow card) 55'; Thiago Ribeiro 87' (yellow card) 90+1'	Report	11' Henrique; (yellow card) 35' Guilherme Teixeira; (yellow card) 45+1' Caíque; (yellow card) 64' Igor; (yellow card) 77' Henrique Santos	Stadium: Vila Belmiro; Attendance: 3,195; Referee: Salim Fende Chavez

==== Knockout stage ====
===== Quarter-final =====
1 April 1st leg	Ponte Preta	1–0	Santos	Campinas
16:00 UTC-03:00	William Pottker 21'; Jadson (yellow card) 44'; Fernando Bob (yellow card) 52'	Report	(yellow card) 90+3' Thiago Maia	Stadium: Moisés Lucarelli; Attendance: 10,645; Referee: Salim Fende Chavez

10 April 2nd leg	Santos	1–0 (1–1 agg.) (4–5 p)	Ponte Preta	São Paulo
20:00 UTC-03:00	David Braz 16'; Vitor Bueno (yellow card) 58'; Victor Ferraz (yellow card) 85'	Report	(yellow card) 38' Clayson; (yellow card) 60' Reynaldo; (yellow card) 63' William Pottker	Stadium: Pacaembu; Attendance: 37,145; Referee: Rafael Gomes Felix da Silva
	Penalties
	Kayke (penalty scored); David Braz (penalty missed); Jean Mota (penalty scored); Copete (penalty scored); Lucas Lima (penalty scored)		(penalty scored) Ravanelli; (penalty scored) Yago; (penalty scored) Clayson; (penalty scored) Jadson; (penalty scored) William Pottker

=== Copa Libertadores ===
==== Group stage ====
Pos	Team	Pld	W	D	L	GF	GA	GD	Pts	Qualification
1	(Brazil) Santos	6	3	3	0	11	4	+7	12	Round of 16
2	(Bolivia) The Strongest	6	2	3	1	9	5	+4	9	Round of 16
3	(Colombia) Santa Fe	6	2	2	2	8	6	+2	8	Copa Sudamericana
4	(Peru) Sporting Cristal	6	0	2	4	2	15	−13	2	

Source: CONMEBOL

9 March 1	Sporting Cristal (Peru)	1–1	(Brazil) Santos	Lima, Peru
19:45 UTC−05:00	Cazulo 13' (yellow card) 90+1'; Lobatón (yellow card) 64'	Report	67' Thiago Maia; (yellow card) 85' Cléber Reis	Stadium: Estadio Nacional; Referee: (Venezuela) José Argote

16 March 2	Santos (Brazil)	2–0	(Bolivia) The Strongest	Santos
21:45 UTC−03:00	Ricardo Oliveira 45+1'; Thiago Maia (yellow card) 74'; Renato 84'	Report	(yellow card) 39' (yellow-red card) 43' Veizaga; (yellow card) 55' Escobar	Stadium: Vila Belmiro; Attendance: 13,132; Referee: (Argentina) Néstor Pitana

19 April 3	Santa Fe (Colombia)	0–0	(Brazil) Santos	Bogotá, Colômbia
19:45 UTC−05:00	Gordillo (yellow card) 9'; Gómez (yellow card) 45'; Perlaza (yellow card) 60'; Mosquera (yellow card) 67'; Plata (yellow card) 90+3'	Report	(yellow card) 22' (yellow-red card) 80' Jean Mota; (yellow card) 52' Thiago Maia; (yellow card) 52' Bruno Henrique	Stadium: El Campín; Attendance: 19,742; Referee: (Argentina) Fernando Rapallini

4 May 4	Santos (Brazil)	3–2	(Colombia) Santa Fe	São Paulo
21:45 UTC−03:00	Ricardo Oliveira 4' (yellow card) 90+1'; Vitor Bueno 35'; Lucas Veríssimo (yellow card) 53' (goal) 78'; Thiago Maia (yellow card) 87'	Report	34' Arango; 40' Perlaza; (yellow card) 66' Moya; (yellow card) 86' Roa	Stadium: Pacaembu; Attendance: 29,748; Referee: (Uruguay) Andrés Cunha

17 May 5	The Strongest (Bolivia)	1–1	(Brazil) Santos	La Paz, Bolívia
18:30 UTC−04:00	Pérez (yellow card) 39'; Chumacero 40'; Castro (yellow card) 61'; Vargas (yellow card) 90'	Report	(yellow card) 7' (yellow-red card) 23' Bruno Henrique; (yellow card) 42' Lucas Lima; 68' Vitor Bueno; (yellow card) 83' Vanderlei	Stadium: Estadio Hernando Siles; Referee: (Argentina) Darío Herrera

23 May 6	Santos (Brazil)	4–0	(Peru) Sporting Cristal	Santos
21:45 UTC−03:00	Victor Ferraz (yellow card) 14'; David Braz 19', 71'; Ricardo Oliveira 23'; Vitor Bueno 67'	Report	(yellow card) 18' Revoredo; (yellow card) 69' Costa	Stadium: Vila Belmiro; Attendance: 6,632; Referee: (Paraguay) José Méndez

==== Knockout stage ====
===== Round of 16 =====
5 July 1st Leg	Atlético Paranaense (Brazil)	2–3	(Brazil) Santos	Curitiba
19:15 UTC−03:00	Nikão 6'; Éderson 71'; Otávio (yellow card) 76'; Thiago Heleno (yellow card) 90'	Report	24', 67' Kayke; 56' Bruno Henrique	Stadium: Vila Capanema; Attendance: 13,770; Referee: (Chile) Roberto Tobar

10 August 2nd Leg	Santos (Brazil)	1–0 (4–2 agg.)	(Brazil) Atlético Paranaense	Santos
21:45 UTC−03:00	Bruno Henrique 78'	Report	(yellow card) 20' Guilherme	Stadium: Vila Belmiro; Attendance: 12,360; Referee: (Argentina) Mauro Vigliano

===== Quarter-finals =====
13 September 1st Leg	Barcelona (Ecuador)	1–1	(Brazil) Santos	Guayaquil
19:45 UTC−05:00	Esterilla (yellow card) 23'; Gabriel Marques (yellow card) 25'; Aimar (yellow card) 55'; Álvez 78'	Report	46' Bruno Henrique; (yellow card) 69' Kayke; (yellow card) 90+2' Vanderlei	Stadium: Monumental Isidro Romero; Attendance: 49,286; Referee: (Uruguay) Daniel Fedorczuk

20 September 2nd Leg	Santos (Brazil)	0–1 (1–2 agg.)	(Ecuador) Barcelona	Santos
21:45 UTC−03:00	Daniel Guedes (yellow card) 24'; Bruno Henrique (yellow card) 76' (red card) 89'	Report	(yellow card) 17' Marcos Caicedo; (yellow card) 38' Beder Caicedo; 68' (yellow card) 69' (red card) 70' Álvez; (red card) 89' Gabriel Marques	Stadium: Vila Belmiro; Attendance: 12,730; Referee: (Peru) Víctor Carrillo
