= Matheus Ribeiro =

Brazilian footballer

Personal information
- Full name: Matheus Antunes Ribeiro
- Date of birth: 23 October 1993 (age 33)
- Place of birth: Erechim, Brazil
- Height: 1.78 m (5 ft 10 in)
- Position: Right back

Team information
- Current team: Náutico
- Number: 14

Youth career
- 2008–2012: Internacional
- 2012–2013: Juventude

Senior career*
Years	Team	Apps	(Gls)
2014	União Frederiquense	18	(2)
2014–2015	Ypiranga-RS	15	(1)
2015	Atlético Paranaense	5	(0)
2016	Atlético Goianiense	42	(3)
2017–2020	Santos	14	(0)
2018	→ Puebla (loan)	5	(0)
2018	→ Figueirense (loan)	7	(0)
2020	→ Chapecoense (loan)	39	(1)
2021	Chapecoense	51	(1)
2022	Avaí	13	(1)
2022	Vasco da Gama	5	(0)
2023–2025	CRB	116	(4)
2026	Atlético Goianiense	13	(0)
2026–	Náutico	14	(0)
- * Club domestic league appearances and goals as of 18 November 2026

Matheus Antunes Ribeiro (born 23 October 1993) is a Brazilian footballer who plays as a right back for Náutico.

== Club career ==
=== Early career ===
Born in Erechim, Rio Grande do Sul, Matheus Ribeiro was an Internacional youth graduate. After a short spell at Juventude, he moved to União Frederiquense on 7 March 2014.

Matheus Ribeiro subsequently joined hometown's Ypiranga in 2014.

=== Atlético Paranaense ===
After impressing with Ypiranga in 2015 Campeonato Gaúcho, Matheus Ribeiro signed a one-year deal with Atlético Paranaense on 27 April of the following year. He made his Série A debut on 4 July 2015, coming on as a late substitute for Eduardo in a 0–2 away loss against Cruzeiro.

Matheus Ribeiro appeared rarely for Furacão during the campaign, and left the club on 11 January 2016.

=== Atlético Goianiense ===
On 20 January 2016, Matheus Ribeiro signed a short-term deal with Série B side Atlético Goianiense. He renewed his contract on 19 May 2016, signing until the end of the year.

Matheus Ribeiro scored his first professional goal on 21 June in a 1–1 draw at Avaí. On 14 October, he scored a double in a 2–1 home win against Paysandu.

=== Santos ===
On 11 November 2016, as his contract was due to expire, Matheus Ribeiro agreed to a pre-contract with Santos, ahead of the 2017 season. He made his debut for the club the following 12 March, starting in a 4–1 Campeonato Paulista away routing of São Bernardo FC.

After the injuries of Zeca and Caju, Matheus made his Copa Libertadores debut on 4 May 2017, starting as a left back in a 3–2 home win against Independiente Santa Fe. He would spend the rest of the season as a backup to Victor Ferraz and Daniel Guedes in the right flank.

On 12 January 2018, Matheus was loaned to Liga MX side Club Puebla for one year, with a buyout clause. He made his debut abroad twelve days later, starting in a 0–0 Copa Mexico home draw against Alebrijes de Oaxaca.

On 12 July 2018, after being rarely used, Matheus was announced by Figueirense on loan until the end of the year, with a buyout clause. His loan was extended for a further campaign on 10 December, but he was recalled the following 20 January after a request from new manager Jorge Sampaoli.

Despite being recalled, Matheus Ribeiro only featured rarely and was subsequently deemed surplus to requirements throughout the season.

=== Chapecoense ===
On 31 December 2019, Matheus Ribeiro moved to Chapecoense on loan for the season. On 6 November, he terminated his contract with Santos and signed for Chape permanently.

== Career statistics ==
As of 25 October 2021

Club	Season	League			State League		Cup		Continental		Other		Total	
Club	Season	Division	Apps	Goals	Apps	Goals	Apps	Goals	Apps	Goals	Apps	Goals	Apps	Goals
União Frederiquense	2014	Gaúcho A2	—		18	2	—		—		—		18	2
Ypiranga-RS	2014	Gaúcho A2	—		0	0	—		—		3 (Note: Appearance(s) in Copa FGF)	0	3	0
Ypiranga-RS	2015	Série D	0	0	15	1	—		—		—		15	1
Ypiranga-RS	Total		0	0	15	1	—		—		3	0	18	1
Atlético Paranaense	2015	Série A	5	0	—		0	0	—		—		5	0
Atlético Goianiense	2016	Série B	35	3	5	0	2	0	—		—		42	3
Santos	2017	Série A	4	0	3	0	1	0	1 (Note: Appearance(s) in Copa Libertadores)	0	—		9	0
Santos	2019	Série A	0	0	4	0	0	0	1 (Note: Appearance(s) in Copa Sudamericana)	0	—		5	0
Santos	Total		4	0	7	0	1	0	2	0	—		14	0
Puebla (loan)	2017–18	Liga MX	2	0	—		3	0	—		—		5	0
Figueirense (loan)	2018	Série B	7	0	—		—		—		—		7	0
Chapecoense	2020	Série B	26	0	13	1	0	0	—		—		39	1
Chapecoense	2021	Série A	28	1	16	0	2	0	—		1 (Note: Appearance(s) in Recopa Catarinense)	0	47	1
Chapecoense	Total		54	1	29	1	2	0	—		1	0	86	2
Career total			107	4	74	4	8	0	2	0	4	0	195	8

== Honours ==
Atlético Goianiense

- Campeonato Brasileiro Série B: 2016

Chapecoense

- Campeonato Catarinense: 2020
- Campeonato Brasileiro Série B: 2020

CRB

- Campeonato Alagoano: 2023, 2024, 2025
