= Emerson (footballer, born 1998) =

Brazilian footballer

Personal information
- Full name: Emerson Barbosa Rodrigues dos Santos
- Date of birth: 18 August 1998 (age 28)
- Place of birth: Cacoal, Brazil
- Height: 1.79 m (5 ft 10 in)
- Position: Left-back

Team information
- Current team: CSKA 1948
- Number: 6

Youth career
- Laranja Mecânica
- Goiás
- Flamengo
- 2016–2018: Santos

Senior career*
Years	Team	Apps	(Gls)
2017–2018	Santos	1	(0)
2019	Tupi	6	(0)
2019	CRAC	1	(0)
2019–2020	Vitória-ES	25	(0)
2021–2022	Ferroviário-CE	45	(1)
2022	→ Pouso Alegre (loan)	1	(0)
2022–2024	Tombense	46	(1)
2024–2026	Guarani	67	(3)
2026–	CSKA 1948	1	(0)
- * Club domestic league appearances and goals as of 16 October 2026

Emerson Barbosa Rodrigues dos Santos (born 18 August 1998), simply known as Emerson, is a Brazilian footballer who plays as a left-back for Bulgarian First League club CSKA 1948.

== Club career ==
Born in Cacoal, Rondônia, Emerson joined Santos' youth setup in 2016, from Flamengo. On 8 November of that year, he signed his first professional contract until 2019.

On 1 December 2017, as Caju, Jean Mota and Orinho were all injured, Emerson was called up to train with the first team by manager Elano. He was included in the 21-man list for the match against Avaí the following day.

Emerson made his first team – and Série A debut on 3 December 2017, coming on as a substitute for Emiliano Vecchio in a 1–1 home draw against the Santa Catarina-based club. For the 2018 campaign, he only featured with the under-23 squad.

On 17 December 2018, Emerson was presented at Tupi. The following 27 February, however, he was announced at CRAC after cutting ties with his previous club, but only played one match for the latter before moving to Vitória-ES in May.

== Career statistics ==
As of 24 February 2025

Club	Season	League			State League		Cup		Continental		Other		Total	
Club	Season	Division	Apps	Goals	Apps	Goals	Apps	Goals	Apps	Goals	Apps	Goals	Apps	Goals
Santos	2017	Série A	1	0	—		—		—		—		1	0
Santos	2018	Série A	0	0	0	0	0	0	—		6 (Note: Appearance(s) in Copa Paulista)	0	6	0
Santos	Total		1	0	0	0	0	0	—		6	0	7	0
Tupi	2019	Série D	0	0	6	0	1	0	—		—		7	0
CRAC	2019	Goiano	—		1	0	—		—		—		1	0
Vitória-ES	2019	Série D	9	0	—		—		—		—		9	0
Vitória-ES	2020	Série D	12	0	4	0	1	0	—		—		17	0
Vitória-ES	Total		21	0	4	0	1	0	—		—		26	0
Ferroviário-CE	2020	Série C	0	0	—		—		—		6 (Note: Appearance(s) in Copa Fares Lopes)	0	6	0
Ferroviário-CE	2021	Série C	13	0	13	1	2	0	—		3 (Note: Appearance(s) in Copa do Nordeste)	0	31	1
Ferroviário-CE	2022	Série C	17	0	2	0	—		—		—		19	0
Ferroviário-CE	Total		30	0	15	1	2	0	—		9	0	56	1
Pouso Alegre (loan)	2022	Série C	0	0	1	0	—		—		—		1	0
Tombense	2022	Série B	6	0	—		—		—		—		6	0
Tombense	2023	Série B	8	0	7	0	1	0	—		—		16	0
Tombense	2024	Série C	17	1	8	0	1	0	—		—		26	1
Tombense	Total		31	1	15	0	2	0	—		—		48	1
Guarani	2024	Série B	10	0	—		—		—		—		10	0
Guarani	2025	Série C	0	0	11	0	—		—		—		11	0
Guarani	Total		10	0	11	0	—		—		—		21	0
Career total			93	1	52	1	4	0	0	0	15	0	164	2

== Honours ==
Ferroviário

- Copa Fares Lopes: 2020
