= Guedes =

Guedes is a Galician–Portuguese surname. Notable people with the surname include:

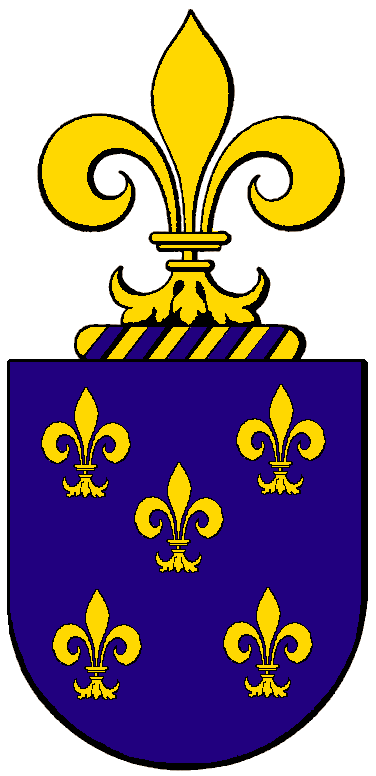
Guedes Coat of Arms

- Alexandre Guedes (born 1994), Portuguese footballer
- Álvarez Guedes (1927–2013), Cuban comedian, actor, writer and businessman
- Baltasar Guedes de Sousa, Captain-major of Portuguese Ceylon
- Beto Guedes (born 1951), Brazilian singer-songwriter
- Christophe Guedes (born 1993), Swiss footballer
- Daniel Guedes (born 1994), Brazilian footballer
- Fátima Guedes (born 1958), Brazilian singer and composer
- Giulliano Gonçalves Guedes (born 1987), Brazilian footballer
- Gonçalo Guedes (born 1996), Portuguese footballer
- Hélder Guedes (born 1987), Portuguese footballer
- Joaquim Guedes (1932–2008), Brazilian architect and urban planner
- Marcelo Antônio Guedes Filho (born 1987), Brazilian footballer
- Manuel Guedes (born 1953), Portuguese footballer
- Miguel Guedes (born 1972), Portuguese musician
- Pancho Guedes (1925–2015), Portuguese architect, sculptor, and painter
- Rita Guedes (born 1972), Brazilian actress
- Róger Guedes (born 1996), Brazilian footballer
- Sérgio Guedes (born 1962), Brazilian footballer and manager
- Paulo Guedes (born 1949), Brazilian economist and Finance Minister (2019-2023)
- Patrícia Christiane Guedes Bastos (born 1970), Brazilian singer-songwriter

== See also ==
- 19875 Guedes, a main-belt asteroid
- Guedes Lupapa (born 1988), Angolan footballer
