= Venda Nova =

Venda Nova may refer to the following places:

- Venda Nova (Amadora), a parish in the municipality of Amadora, Portugal
- Venda Nova (Montalegre), a parish in the municipality of Montalegre, Portugal
- Venda Nova (Brazil), an administrative region of the city of Belo Horizonte in Brazil

== See also ==
- Vendas Novas, a parish and a municipality in the district of Évora, Portugal
