= Giulliano =

Brazilian footballer (born 1987)

Personal information
- Full name: Giulliano Gonçalves Guedes
- Date of birth: 19 May 1987 (age 39)
- Place of birth: Venda Nova, Minas Gerais, Brazil
- Height: 1.80 m (5 ft 11 in)
- Position: Goalkeeper

Senior career*
| Years | Team | Apps | (Gls) |
| 2004–2010 | Atlético Mineiro | | |
| 2007 | → Ituiutaba (loan) | | |
| 2008 | → Guarani de Divinópolis (loan) | | |
| 2010 | Formiga | | |
| 2010 | Tricordiano | | |
| 2011–2012 | Paulista | | |
| 2012 | Velo Clube | | |
| 2013 | Valeriodoce | | |
| 2014 | URT | | |
| 2014 | CRAC | 6 | (0) |
| 2014 | URT | | |
| 2015–2016 | Uberaba | | |
- * Club domestic league appearances and goals

Giulliano Gonçalves Guedes or simply Giulliano (born 19 May 1987 in Venda Nova, Minas Gerais), is a former Brazilian footballer who played as a goalkeeper.

Guilliano was on the books of Atlético Mineiro for ten years, playing on loan for a number of clubs.

In 2011, Guilliano joined Paulista Futebol Clube in the north of São Paulo state, his first experience outside of his home state of Minas Gerais. With Paulista, he played as a backup goalkeeper during their 2011 and 2012 Campeonato Paulista campaigns.

Guilliano joined Velo Clube in 2013, where he played 13 matches in the Campeonato Paulista Série A2.

In 2014, Guilliano was signed by União Recreativa dos Trabalhadores (URT), where he played 11 times in the 2014 Campeonato Mineiro, including a memorable performance against eventual winners' Cruzeiro. After a short stint in the Campeonato Brasileiro Série C with Clube Recreativo e Atlético Catalano (CRAC), where he appeared in six league matches, he rejoined URT to play six matches in the 2015 Campeonato Mineiro.

== Contract ==
- Guarani-MG 2 January 2008 to 30 May 2008
- Atlético Mineiro 19 March 2004 to 15 March 2009
- Formiga Esporte Clube 1 January 2010 to 4 June 2010
