= Matheus Jesus =

Brazilian footballer

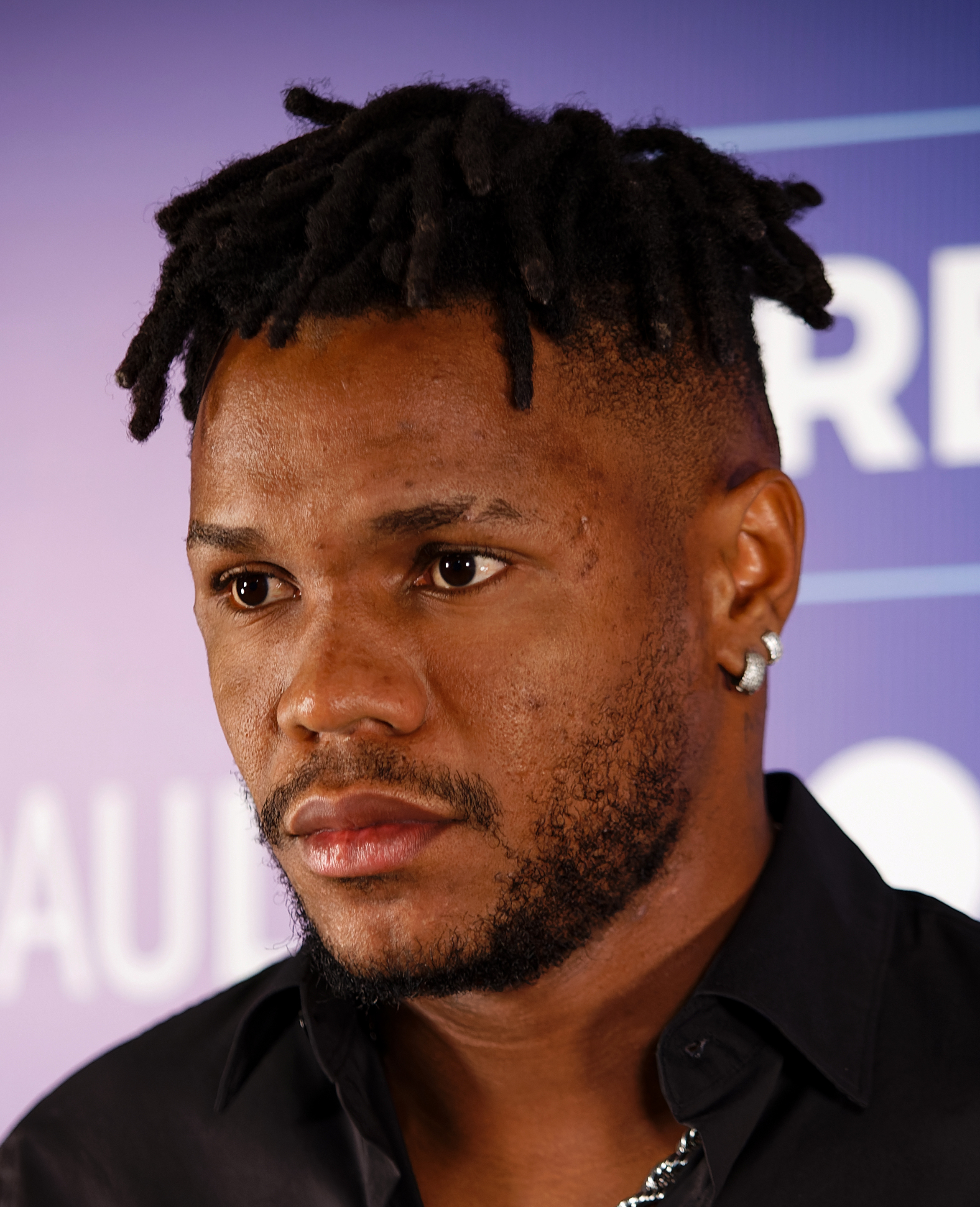

Personal information
- Full name: Matheus Sousa de Jesus
- Date of birth: 10 April 1997 (age 29)
- Place of birth: Salvador, Brazil
- Height: 1.86 m (6 ft 1 in)
- Position: Attacking midfielder

Team information
- Current team: V-Varen Nagasaki
- Number: 6

Youth career
- 2011–2014: Flamengo
- 2015–2016: Ponte Preta

Senior career*
Years	Team	Apps	(Gls)
2016–2017	Ponte Preta	41	(3)
2017–2019	Estoril	0	(0)
2017–2018	→ Santos (loan)	14	(0)
2018	→ Gamba Osaka (loan)	18	(1)
2018	→ Portimonense (loan)	1	(0)
2019	→ Oeste (loan)	17	(6)
2019	→ Corinthians (loan)	9	(0)
2020–2023	Corinthians	0	(0)
2020–2021	→ Red Bull Bragantino (loan)	22	(3)
2021	→ Juventude (loan)	17	(0)
2021	→ Náutico (loan)	10	(1)
2022	→ Ponte Preta (loan)	5	(0)
2023–	V-Varen Nagasaki	111	(49)

International career^{‡}
2016	Brazil U20	1	(0)
- * Club domestic league appearances and goals as of 11 October 2026 ‡ National team caps and goals as of 22:05, 15 June 2017 (UTC)

Matheus Sousa de Jesus (born 10 April 1997), known as Matheus Jesus, is a Brazilian footballer who plays as a attacking midfielder for J1 League club V-Varen Nagasaki.

== Club career ==
=== Ponte Preta ===
Born in Salvador, Bahia, Matheus Jesus joined Ponte Preta's youth setup in 2015, after being released by Flamengo. Promoted to the former's main squad in January 2016 by manager Eduardo Baptista, he made his senior debut on 5 May by starting in a 1–0 Copa do Brasil away win against Genus.

Matheus Jesus scored his first senior goal on 13 May 2016, netting the first in a 3–0 home win against Genus. Two days later he made his Série A debut by starting in a 0–0 away draw against Figueirense, and extended his contract until December 2020 on 18 May.

Matheus Jesus finished his first season with 24 league appearances, as his side finished eighth and just four points shy of a Copa Libertadores qualification. His good performances drew interest from clubs across Europe, including Sporting CP and Fiorentina.

After featuring regularly in 2017 Campeonato Paulista, which his side finished second, Matheus Jesus was separated from the first team squad in May 2017, due to an "indiscipline problem".

=== Estoril ===
On 28 June 2017, Matheus Jesus signed a five-year contract with Primeira Liga side G.D. Estoril Praia. Initially linked to a loan move to São Paulo, the deal later collapsed.

==== Santos (loan) ====
On 18 July 2017, Matheus Jesus joined Santos on loan until December 2018. A backup to Alison and Renato, he only featured in 14 matches for the club.

==== Gamba Osaka (loan) ====
On 7 March 2018, it was announced that Matheus Jesus would join Japanese side Gamba Osaka on loan from Santos for the 2018 season where he would be coached by his compatriot Levir Culpi. On 13 August 2018, his loan was cancelled.

==== Portimonense (loan) ====
On 31 August 2018, Matheus Jesus joined Portuguese side Portimonense on loan for the campaign. He would only appear in one match for the club before leaving in December.

==== Oeste (loan) ====
On 7 January 2019, Matheus Jesus was announced as one of Oeste's 17 signings for the 2019 season. He impressed during his time at Rubrão, scoring six goals and being the club's top goalscorer (and the second overall) in the 2019 Campeonato Paulista.

==== Corinthians (loan) ====
On 9 May 2019, Matheus Jesus agreed to a loan contract with Corinthians until December, with a fixed buyout clause and an arranged permanent deal until 2023.

=== V-Varen Nagasaki ===
On 17 August 2023, it was announced that Matheus Jesus signs with V-Varen Nagasaki.

== International career ==
Matheus Jesus made one appearance for the Brazil under-20 side in 2016, replacing Caio Henrique after 75 minutes in a friendly against England.

== Career statistics ==
As of 11 October 2026

Club	Season	League			State League		Cup		Continental		Other		Total	
Club	Season	Division	Apps	Goals	Apps	Goals	Apps	Goals	Apps	Goals	Apps	Goals	Apps	Goals
Ponte Preta	2016	Série A	25	0	—		5	2	—		—		30	2
Ponte Preta	2017	Série A	0	0	10	1	2	0	0	0	—		12	1
Ponte Preta	Total		25	0	10	1	7	2	0	0	—		42	3
Santos (loan)	2017	Série A	10	0	—		—		0	0	—		10	0
Santos (loan)	2018	Série A	—		4	0	—		0	0	—		4	0
Santos (loan)	Total		10	0	4	0	0	0	0	0	—		14	0
Gamba Osaka (loan)	2018	J1 League	13	1	—		1	0	—		4 (Note: Appearances in J. League Cup)	0	18	1
Portimonense (loan)	2018–19	Primeira Liga	1	0	—		0	0	—		—		1	0
Oeste (loan)	2019	Série B	0	0	15	6	2	0	—		—		17	6
Corinthians	2019	Série A	6	0	—		—		3 (Note: Appearances in Copa Sudamericana)	0	—		9	0
Red Bull Bragantino (loan)	2020	Série A	12	0	10	3	0	0	—		—		22	3
Juventude (loan)	2021	Série A	14	0	3	0	0	0	—		—		17	0
Náutico (loan)	2021	Série B	10	1	—		—		—		—		10	1
Ponte Preta (loan)	2022	Série B	0	0	5	0	0	0	—		—		5	0
Ponte Preta (loan)	2023	Série B	16	1	—		2	0	—		—		18	1
Ponte Preta (loan)	Total		16	1	5	0	2	0	—		—		23	1
V-Varen Nagasaki	2023	J2 League	12	1	—		—		—		—		12	1
V-Varen Nagasaki	2024	J2 League	37	19	—		2	1	—		4	2	43	22
V-Varen Nagasaki	2025	J2 League	38	19	—		1	0	—		1	0	40	19
V-Varen Nagasaki	2026	J1 League	18	7	—		—		—		—		18	7
V-Varen Nagasaki	2026–27	J1 League	6	3	—		0	0	—		2	0	8	3
V-Varen Nagasaki	Total		111	49	—		3	1	—		7	2	121	52
Career total			218	52	47	10	15	3	3	0	11	2	294	67

== Honours ==
=== Individual ===
- J2 League Best XI: 2024
