= Rodrigão (footballer, born 1993) =

Brazilian footballer

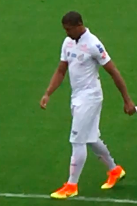
- Rodrigão with Santos in 2016

Personal information
- Full name: Rodrigo Gomes dos Santos
- Date of birth: 13 October 1993 (age 33)
- Place of birth: Belmonte, Brazil
- Height: 1.86 m (6 ft 1 in)
- Position: Striker

Senior career*
Years	Team	Apps	(Gls)
2013–2015	Democrata-GV	26	(8)
2015	Boa Esporte	5	(0)
2015–2016	Campinense	23	(16)
2016–2022	Santos	32	(8)
2017	→ Bahia (loan)	14	(5)
2018	→ Avaí (loan)	29	(8)
2019	→ Coritiba (loan)	42	(21)
2020	→ Ceará (loan)	5	(1)
2020–2021	→ Avaí (loan)	6	(0)
2021	→ Ponte Preta (loan)	25	(5)
2022	Sport Recife	10	(2)
2022	Vitória	7	(1)
2023	Cascavel	0	(0)
- * Club domestic league appearances and goals as of 16:06, 19 October 2023 (UTC)

Rodrigo Gomes dos Santos (born 13 October 1993), commonly known as Rodrigão (Brazilian Portuguese: [ʁodɾiˈgɐ̃w]), is a Brazilian footballer who plays as a striker.

== Club career ==
=== Early career ===
Born in Belmonte, Bahia, Rodrigão joined Democrata-GV in late 2013, after impressing on a trial basis. He made his debut for the club in the following year, in Campeonato Mineiro Módulo II. In March 2015 he moved to Boa Esporte.

Rodrigão made his professional debut on 8 May 2015, starting in a 0–1 away loss against Atlético Goianiense for the Série B championship. On 9 June, after appearing in only five games, he was released.

=== Campinense ===
On 19 June 2015 Rodrigão joined Campinense in Série D. On 12 July he scored a brace in a 2–0 home win against Globo, and added a hat-trick in a 3–1 win against Coruripe on 16 August.

Rodrigão started the 2016 season with a match-winning goal in a 2–1 Campeonato Paraibano home success over CSP on 30 January. He also scored two further hat-tricks in the following month, against Esporte de Patos (7–1 home win) and Imperatriz (3–0 away win).

=== Santos ===
On 19 March 2016 Rodrigão agreed to a pre-contract with Série A club Santos, with the deal being effective on 1 June. He signed a five-year contract with the club on 30 May, being immediately included in the first team squad.

Rodrigão made his Peixe – and Série A – debut on 22 June 2016, starting and scoring his team's first in a 4–2 away win against Fluminense; he also provided the assist for Luiz Felipe's fourth goal. He added his second goal four days later, the second in a 3–0 home success over São Paulo.

Rodrigão acted mainly as a backup to Ricardo Oliveira during the rest of the year, and scored only league three goals. He started the 2017 campaign by scoring a double in a 6–2 Campeonato Paulista home routing of Linense, as Oliveira was still recuperating from mumps.

On 7 July 2017, after struggling with injuries and being demoted to third-choice after the arrival of Kayke, Rodrigão was loaned to fellow top tier club Bahia until the end of the season.

Back to Santos, Rodrigão began the 2018 season as a starter under new manager Jair Ventura. On 9 April of that year, after losing competition to new signings Eduardo Sasha and Gabriel, he was loaned to Série B side Avaí until December.

On 6 February 2019, Rodrigão was presented at Coritiba still in the second division, after agreeing to a one-year loan deal. On 30 December, after helping with 13 league goals as his side achieved promotion, he joined Ceará in the top tier, on loan for one year.

In November 2020, after falling down the pecking order, Rodrigão left Ceará and returned to his former side Avaí, also in a temporary deal. He also featured rarely at his new side, and moved to Ponte Preta on loan on 8 June 2021.

=== Sport Recife ===
In February 2022, Rodrigão terminated his contract with Santos and joined Sport Recife on a short-term deal.

== Career statistics ==
As of 20 October 2023

Club	Season	League			State League		Cup		Continental		Other		Total	
Club	Season	Division	Apps	Goals	Apps	Goals	Apps	Goals	Apps	Goals	Apps	Goals	Apps	Goals
Democrata-GV	2014	Mineiro Módulo II	—		16	7	—		—		—		16	7
Democrata-GV	2015	Mineiro	—		10	1	—		—		—		10	1
Democrata-GV	Subtotal		0	0	26	8	0	0	0	0	0	0	26	8
Boa Esporte	2015	Série B	5	0	—		—		—		—		5	0
Campinense	2015	Série D	8	5	—		—		—		—		8	5
Campinense	2016	Série D	0	0	14	9	—		—		12 (Note: Appearance(s) in Copa do Nordeste)	9	26	18
Campinense	Subtotal		8	5	14	9	0	0	0	0	12	9	34	23
Santos	2016	Série A	15	3	—		4	1	—		—		19	4
Santos	2017	Série A	2	0	6	3	0	0	0	0	—		8	3
Santos	2018	Série A	0	0	5	1	—		—		—		5	1
Santos	Subtotal		17	3	11	4	4	1	0	0	—		32	8
Bahia (loan)	2017	Série A	14	5	—		—		—		—		14	5
Avaí (loan)	2018	Série B	27	7	—		2	1	—		—		29	8
Coritiba (loan)	2019	Série B	33	13	8	7	1	1	—		—		42	21
Ceará (loan)	2020	Série A	0	0	5	1	0	0	—		4	0	9	1
Avaí (loan)	2020	Série B	6	0	—		—		—		—		6	0
Ponte Preta (loan)	2021	Série B	25	5	—		—		—		—		25	5
Sport Recife	2022	Série B	2	0	4	1	1	0	—		3	1	10	2
Vitória	2022	Série C	7	1	—		—		—		—		7	1
Cascavel	2023	Série D	0	0	0	0	—		—		—		0	0
Career total			144	39	68	30	8	3	0	0	19	10	239	82
