= Guilherme Teixeira =

Brazilian footballer (born 1992)

Personal information
- Full name: Guilherme Thiago Teixeira
- Date of birth: 30 January 1992 (age 34)
- Place of birth: Marília, Brazil
- Height: 1.90 m (6 ft 3 in)
- Position: Defender

Team information
- Current team: Marília Atlético Clube
- Number: 3

Senior career*
| Years | Team | Apps | (Gls) |
| 2008–2013 | Marília | 17 | (0) |
| 2011 | → Assisense (loan) | 5 | (1) |
| 2014–2018 | Novorizontino | 64 | (3) |
| 2014–2015 | → Grêmio Prudente (loan) | 0 | (0) |
| 2016 | → Linense (loan) | 3 | (0) |
| 2016–2017 | → Vila Nova (loan) | 30 | (1) |
| 2018 | → Paysandu | 3 | (0) |
| 2019 | Mirassol | 1 | (0) |
| 2020–2022 | Noroeste | 64 | (11) |
| 2020–2021 | → Figueirense (loan) | 31 | (3) |
| 2023– | Marília Atlético Clube | 14 | (1) |
- * Club domestic league appearances and goals as of 23:33, 25 April 2020 (UTC)

Guilherme Thiago Teixeira (born 30 January 1992) is a Brazilian footballer who plays for Marília Atlético Clube as a defender.

== Career statistics ==
As of 30 March 2017

| Club | Season | League | | | State League | | Cup | | Continental | | Other | | Total | |
| Club | Season | Division | Apps | Goals | Apps | Goals | Apps | Goals | Apps | Goals | Apps | Goals | Apps | Goals |
|---|---|---|---|---|---|---|---|---|---|---|---|---|---|---|
| Marília | 2010 | Série C | 1 | 0 | — | | — | | — | | 4 (Note: All appearance(s) in Copa Paulista) | 0 | 5 | 0 |
| Marília | 2012 | Série D | 1 | 0 | 0 | 0 | — | | — | | 5 | 0 | 6 | 0 |
| Marília | 2013 | Paulista | — | | 15 | 0 | — | | — | | — | | 15 | 0 |
| Marília | Subtotal | | 2 | 0 | 15 | 0 | — | | — | | 9 | 0 | 26 | 0 |
| Matonense | 2013 | Paulista B | — | | 16 | 2 | — | | — | | — | | 16 | 2 |
| Novorizontino | 2014 | Paulista A3 | — | | 25 | 2 | — | | — | | — | | 25 | 2 |
| Novorizontino | 2015 | Paulista A2 | — | | 16 | 1 | — | | — | | — | | 16 | 1 |
| Novorizontino | 2016 | Paulista | — | | 2 | 0 | — | | — | | — | | 2 | 0 |
| Novorizontino | 2017 | Paulista | — | | 8 | 0 | — | | — | | — | | 8 | 0 |
| Novorizontino | Subtotal | | — | | 51 | 3 | — | | — | | — | | 51 | 3 |
| Grêmio Prudente | 2014 | Paulista B | — | | 15 | 3 | — | | — | | — | | 15 | 3 |
| Grêmio Prudente | 2015 | Paulista B | — | | 17 | 1 | — | | — | | — | | 17 | 1 |
| Grêmio Prudente | Subtotal | | — | | 32 | 4 | — | | — | | — | | 32 | 4 |
| Linense | 2016 | Série D | 3 | 0 | — | | — | | — | | — | | 3 | 0 |
| Vila Nova | 2016 | Série B | 21 | 1 | — | | — | | — | | — | | 21 | 1 |
| Career total | | | 26 | 1 | 114 | 9 | 0 | 0 | 0 | 0 | 9 | 0 | 149 | 10 |
