= Daniel Guedes =

Brazilian footballer (born 1994)

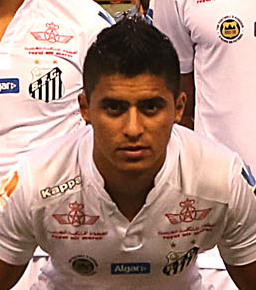
- Guedes with Santos in 2016

Personal information
- Full name: Daniel Guedes da Silva
- Date of birth: 2 April 1994 (age 32)
- Place of birth: João Ramalho, Brazil
- Height: 1.80 m (5 ft 11 in)
- Position: Right back

Team information
- Current team: Juventus-SP
- Number: 2

Youth career
- EF João Ramalho
- Marília
- 2009–2011: São Paulo
- 2011–2014: Santos

Senior career*
Years	Team	Apps	(Gls)
2014–2022	Santos	57	(1)
2019	→ Goiás (loan)	17	(0)
2020	→ Cruzeiro (loan)	7	(0)
2021	→ Fortaleza (loan)	8	(0)
2022	Cuiabá	14	(0)
2023	Juventude	3	(0)
2025	Paraná	9	(0)
2026–	Juventus-SP	0	(0)
- * Club domestic league appearances and goals as of 05:31, 6 May 2026 (UTC)

Daniel Guedes da Silva ((Brazilian Portuguese: [dɐniˈɛw ˈɡɛdʒis]); born 2 April 1994) is a Brazilian footballer who plays as a right back for Juventus-SP.

== Club career ==
=== Santos ===
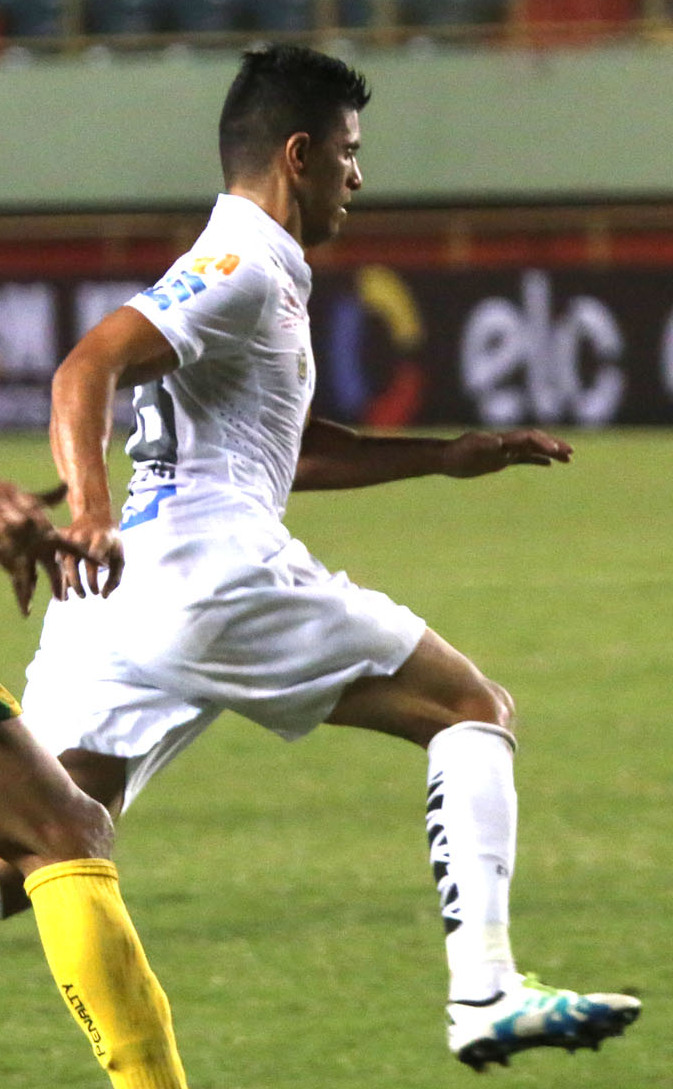
Guedes playing for Santos in 2016

Born in João Ramalho, São Paulo, Guedes joined Santos FC's youth setup in 2011, aged 17. On 19 February 2014 he renewed his link with Peixe until 2017.

On 30 November 2014, Guedes made his first team – and Série A – debut, starting in a 2–0 home win against Botafogo. He established himself as a starter under new head coach Marcelo Fernandes in the following year, as the starting right-back Victor Ferraz was regularly used in the other flank.

On 22 September 2015, Guedes further extended his contract until February 2019. Mainly a backup option to Victor Ferraz, he scored his first professional goal on 12 July 2017, netting from a direct free kick in a 1–0 away win against Atlético Mineiro.

On 18 July 2017, Guedes renewed his contract until June 2022. He began the 2018 campaign as a starter under new head coach Jair Ventura, but subsequently lost his starting spot to longtime incumbent Victor Ferraz.

==== Goiás (loan) ====
On 12 March 2019, after being demoted to third-choice after the return Matheus Ribeiro, Guedes was loaned to fellow top tier side Goiás until the end of the year. He initially split his starting spot with Yago Rocha, but was preventively suspended in September after being caught in a doping exam.

Guedes was sentenced an eight-month ban on 16 July 2020, but since he already had spent ten months without playing, his sentence was already served. He was later able to prove that the contamination came from a soursop juice.

==== Cruzeiro (loan) ====
On 8 August 2020, Guedes was loaned to Série B side Cruzeiro until December 2021. He left the club in November, after just seven matches, and attempted to return to Goiás on loan until the end of the campaign; he only stayed at the club for two weeks, as the loan was subsequently declared void after Goiás failed to reach an agreement with Santos.

Back to the Raposa, Guedes was separated from the first team squad by new head coach Luiz Felipe Scolari.

==== Fortaleza (loan) ====
On 4 March 2021, Guedes joined top tier side Fortaleza on loan for the 2021 campaign.

==== 2022 season ====
Upon returning, Guedes was not registered by Peixe for the 2022 Campeonato Paulista, and terminated his contract with the club on 24 March 2022.

=== Cuiabá ===
On 9 April 2022, Guedes signed for Cuiabá also in the top tier. He featured in 14 league matches as his side narrowly avoided relegation.

=== Later career ===
On 12 December 2022, Guedes was announced at Juventude in the second division. After leaving the club at the end of the 2023 season, he spent nearly a year without a club before signing for Paraná on 26 November 2024.

On 30 November 2025, Guedes was confirmed as Juventus-SP's new signing for the upcoming campaign.

== Career statistics ==
As of match played 22 September 2026

Club	Season	League			State League		Cup		Continental		Other		Total	
Club	Season	Division	Apps	Goals	Apps	Goals	Apps	Goals	Apps	Goals	Apps	Goals	Apps	Goals
Santos	2014	Série A	2	0	—		0	0	—		—		2	0
Santos	2015	Série A	18	0	—		3	0	—		—		21	0
Santos	2016	Série A	2	0	—		3	0	—		—		5	0
Santos	2017	Série A	16	1	—		0	0	2 (Note: Appearance(s) in Copa Libertadores)	0	—		18	1
Santos	2018	Série A	8	0	11	0	3	0	6	0	—		28	0
Santos	2022	Série A	0	0	—		0	0	0	0	—		0	0
Santos	Subtotal		46	1	11	0	9	0	8	0	—		74	1
Goiás (loan)	2019	Série A	15	0	2	0	0	0	—		1 (Note: Appearance(s) in Copa Verde)	0	18	0
Cruzeiro (loan)	2020	Série B	7	0	—		—		—		—		7	0
Fortaleza (loan)	2021	Série A	4	0	4	0	2	0	—		3 (Note: Appearance(s) in Copa do Nordeste)	0	13	0
Cuiabá	2022	Série A	14	0	—		1	0	0	0	—		15	0
Juventude	2023	Série B	0	0	3	0	0	0	—		8 (Note: Appearance(s) in Copa FGF)	0	11	0
Paraná	2025	Paranaense	—		9	0	—		—		—		9	0
Juventus-SP	2026	Paulista A2	—		0	0	—		—		5 (Note: Appearance(s) in Copa Paulista)	0	5	0
Career total			86	1	29	0	12	0	8	0	17	0	153	1

== Honours ==
Santos

- Copa São Paulo de Futebol Júnior: 2013, 2014
- Copa do Brasil Sub-20: 2013
- Campeonato Paulista: 2016

Fortaleza

- Campeonato Cearense: 2021

Juventus-SP

- Campeonato Paulista Série A2: 2026
