= Orinho =

Brazilian footballer (born 1995)

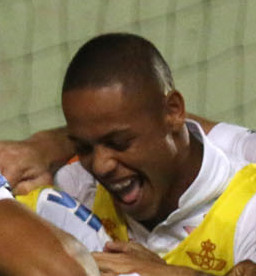
- Orinho with Santos in 2016

Personal information
- Full name: Edilson Borba de Aquino
- Date of birth: 24 May 1995 (age 31)
- Place of birth: São Paulo, Brazil
- Height: 1.80 m (5 ft 11 in)
- Position: Left back

Team information
- Current team: Zakho
- Number: 3

Youth career
- Grêmio Osasco
- 2013–2015: Juventus-SP
- 2015: → Santos (loan)

Senior career*
Years	Team	Apps	(Gls)
2014–2016	Juventus-SP	20	(1)
2016	→ Santos (loan)	0	(0)
2016–2019	Santos	8	(0)
2018	→ Ponte Preta (loan)	28	(0)
2019–2021	Fluminense	11	(0)
2020–2021	→ Oeste (loan)	4	(0)
2022–2023	Dinamo Minsk	50	(2)
2024	Rodina Moscow	14	(0)
2024–2025	Khimki	22	(0)
2025–	Zakho	7	(0)
- * Club domestic league appearances and goals as of 23 November 2025

Edilson Borba de Aquino (born 24 May 1995), commonly known as Orinho, is a Brazilian footballer who plays as a left back for Iraqi club Zakho.

== Club career ==
=== Juventus ===
Born in São Paulo, Orinho joined Juventus-SP in 2013, from Grêmio Osasco. He made his senior debut for the former on 19 July 2014, coming on as a second-half substitute in a 0–0 Copa Paulista away draw against Santo André.

After impressing with the youth sides, Orinho was promoted to the main squad before the start of the 2015 Campeonato Paulista Série A3. He featured regularly during the tournament, scoring his first senior goal on 18 March through a direct free kick in a 2–0 home win against Cotia FC.

=== Santos ===
On 16 July 2015, Orinho joined Santos on a one-year loan deal, being initially assigned to the under-20 squad. The following year, he was promoted to the reserve side, and was bought outright on 3 June 2016, signing a permanent three-year contract.

In July 2017, after the departure of Caju and the injury of Zeca, Orinho was promoted to the main squad by manager Levir Culpi. He made his first team – and Série A – debut on 16 September, starting in a 2–0 away loss against Botafogo.

On 15 January 2018, Orinho was loaned to Ponte Preta until the end of the year. Upon returning, he became the only effective in the left back position and started the campaign as a first-choice under new manager Jorge Sampaoli, but lost his starting spot after the arrival of Felipe Jonatan.

=== Fluminense ===
On 18 September 2019, Orinho joined Fluminense until the end of 2020.

=== Rodina Moscow ===
On 7 January 2024, Orinho signed with Russian club Rodina Moscow.

=== Khimki ===
On 18 June 2024, Orinho signed with Khimki in the Russian Premier League.

== Career statistics ==
As of match played 24 May 2025

Appearances and goals by club, season and competition
Club	Season	League			National Cup		Continental		Other		Total	
Club	Season	Division	Apps	Goals	Apps	Goals	Apps	Goals	Apps	Goals	Apps	Goals
Juventus-SP	2014	Paulista A3	—		—		—		4 (Note: Appearances in Copa Paulista)	0	4	0
Juventus-SP	2015	Paulista A3	—		—		—		20 (Note: Appearances in Campeonato Paulista Série A3)	1	20	1
Juventus-SP	Total		0	0	0	0	0	0	24	1	24	1
Santos (loan)	2016	Série A	0	0	0	0	—		—		0	0
Santos	2016	Série A	0	0	0	0	—		8	0	8	0
Santos	2017	Série A	2	0	0	0	0	0	—		2	0
Santos	2019	Série A	0	0	0	0	1 (Note: Appearance in Copa Sudamericana)	0	6 (Note: Appearances in Campeonato Paulista)	0	7	0
Santos	Total		2	0	0	0	1	0	14	0	17	0
Santos B	2017	N/A	—		—		—		1	0	1	0
Ponte Preta (loan)	2018	Série B	15	0	7	1	—		13	0	35	1
Fluminense	2019	Série A	5	0	—		—		—		5	0
Fluminense	2020	Série A	0	0	0	0	0	0	6 (Note: Appearances in Campeonato Carioca)	0	6	0
Fluminense	Total		5	0	0	0	0	0	6	0	11	0
Oeste (loan)	2020	Série B	4	0	—		—		—		4	0
Dinamo Minsk	2022	Belarusian Premier League	23	0	3	0	3 (Note: Appearances in the UEFA Europa Conference League)	0	—		29	0
Dinamo Minsk	2023	Belarusian Premier League	27	2	0	0	2	0	—		29	2
Dinamo Minsk	Total		50	2	3	0	5	0	0	0	58	2
Rodina Moscow	2023–24	Russian First League	14	0	1	0	—		—		15	0
Khimki	2024–25	Russian Premier League	22	0	3	0	—		—		25	0
Career total			112	2	14	1	6	0	58	1	190	4
