= Eduardo (footballer, born 20 November 1986) =

Brazilian footballer

Personal information
- Full name: Carlos Eduardo Santos Oliveira
- Date of birth: 20 November 1986 (age 39)
- Place of birth: Maceió, Brazil
- Height: 1.70 m (5 ft 7 in)
- Position: Right back

Youth career
- 2004–2006: CRB

Senior career*
| Years | Team | Apps | (Gls) |
| 2006 | CRB | 22 | (1) |
| 2007–2008 | Vasco da Gama | 12 | (0) |
| 2008 | → Duque de Caxias (loan) | 11 | (1) |
| 2009 | CSA | 5 | (1) |
| 2009 | Guaratinguetá | 1 | (0) |
| 2009–2010 | Confiança | 8 | (0) |
| 2009 | → River Plate-SE (loan) | | |
| 2010–2013 | Joinville | 153 | (10) |
| 2014–2015 | Criciúma | 43 | (0) |
| 2015 | → Atlético Paranaense (loan) | 42 | (0) |
| 2016–2017 | Atlético Paranaense | 17 | (0) |
| 2016–2017 | → Bahia (loan) | 62 | (0) |
| 2018–2019 | Chapecoense | 79 | (1) |
| 2020–2021 | Ceará | 18 | (1) |
| 2021 | América Mineiro | 11 | (0) |
| 2022–2023 | Sport Recife | 43 | (0) |
| 2024 | CSA | 4 | (0) |
| 2024 | Cianorte | 7 | (0) |
- * Club domestic league appearances and goals as of 15:05, 13 October 2021 (UTC)

Carlos Eduardo Santos Oliveira (born 20 November 1986), known as Eduardo, is a Brazilian footballer who plays as a right back.

== Biography ==
Eduardo was signed by Vasco in December 2006. He was loaned to Duque de Caxias along with Madson in January 2008 for 2008 Campeonato Carioca. In January 2009 he was transferred to CSA, signed a contract until the end of 2009 Campeonato Alagoano. In February, he was signed by Guaratinguetá until the end of 2009 Campeonato Paulista. In May, he joined Confiança for 2009 Série C. He was signed by River Plate de Carmópolis in August, winning 2009 Campeonato Sergipano Segunda Divisão.

In January 2010 he was signed by Joinville in 1-year contract. He extended the deal in November.

== Honours ==
River Plate-SE

- Campeonato Sergipano Segunda Divisão: 2009

Joinville

- Copa Santa Catarina: 2011, 2012, 2013
- Campeonato Brasileiro Série C: 2011

Atlético Paranaense

- Campeonato Paranaense: 2016

Bahia

- Copa do Nordeste: 2017

Ceará

- Copa do Nordeste: 2020
