= Venda Nova, Belo Horizonte =

Neighbourhood in Belo Horizonte, Brazil

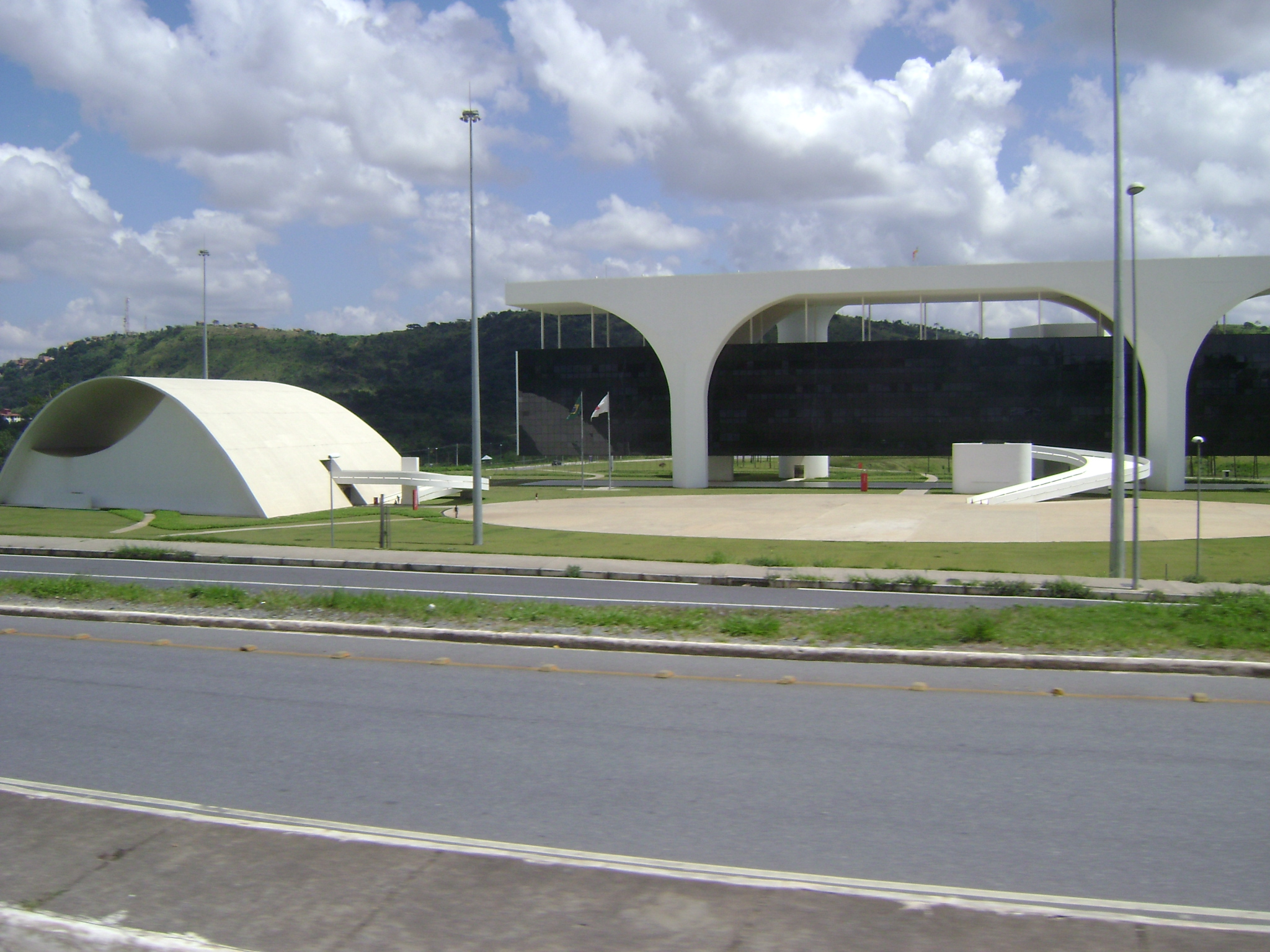
Juscelino Kubitschek auditorium and Tiradentes palace in Venda Nova

Venda Nova is a neighborhood (bairro) of Belo Horizonte, the third largest city in Brazil. It is situated on the northern side of the city, between the downtown area and the Belo Horizonte International Airport. It is known, among other things, for the "Quadras do Vilarinho" (Soccer courts on Vilarinho) and Shopping Norte. One of the principal arterial roads in the area is the Avenida Vilarinho that connects to Pedro I/Antônio Carlos e Cristiano Machado Avenues. These connect the area to the center of Belo Horizonte.
