= Alison (footballer, born 1993) =

Brazilian footballer

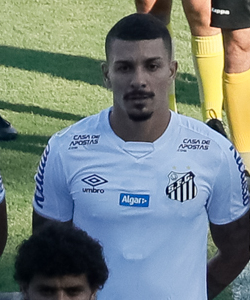
- Alison with Santos in 2019

Personal information
- Full name: Alison Lopes Ferreira
- Date of birth: 1 March 1993 (age 33)
- Place of birth: Mongaguá, Brazil
- Height: 1.80 m (5 ft 11 in)
- Position: Defensive midfielder

Youth career
- 2004–2013: Santos

Senior career*
Years	Team	Apps	(Gls)
2011–2021	Santos	208	(3)
2017	→ Red Bull Brasil (loan)	14	(0)
2021–2022	Al-Hazem	19	(0)
2023–2024	Santos	6	(0)
2025	Londrina	36	(0)
Total		283	(3)

International career
2014	Brazil U20	5	(0)
- * Club domestic league appearances and goals

Alison Lopes Ferreira (born 1 March 1993), simply known as Alison, is a Brazilian retired footballer who played as a defensive midfielder.

== Club career ==
=== Santos ===
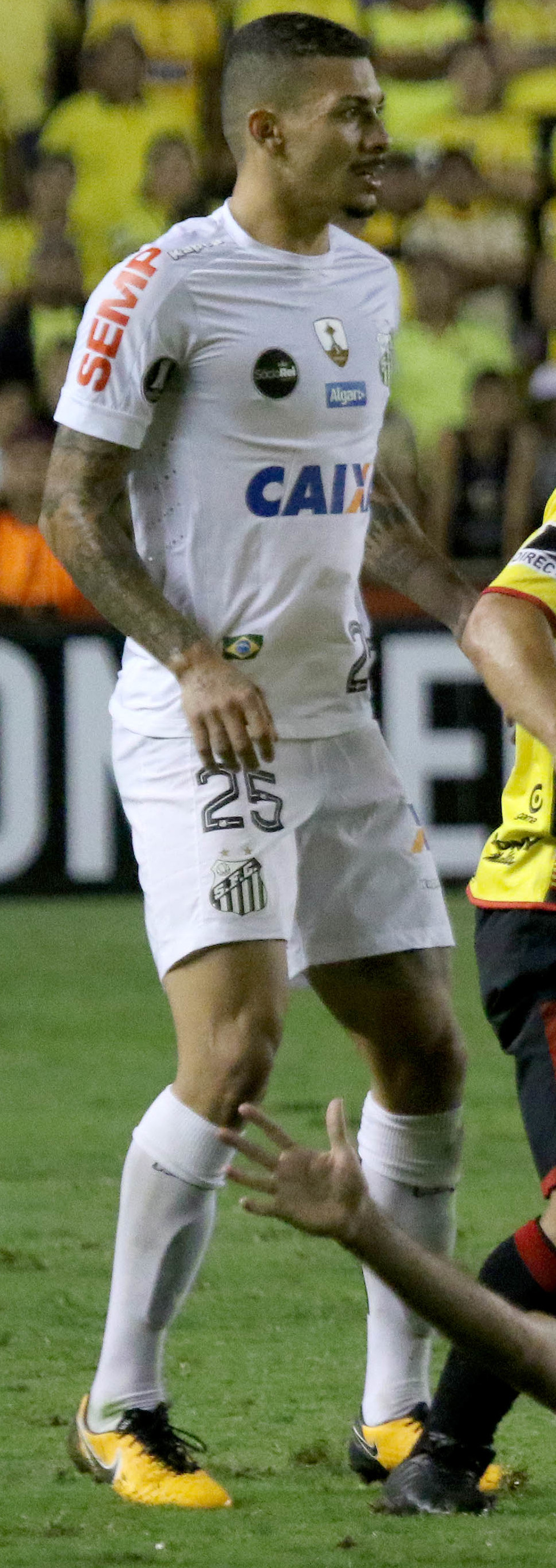
Alison playing for Santos in 2017

Born in Mongaguá, São Paulo, Alison joined Santos' youth setup in 2004, aged 11. On 10 September 2011 he made his professional debut, starting in a 1–0 home success over Cruzeiro. However, after only two minutes in field, he had to be replaced due to a knee injury, which kept him sidelined for six months.

Alison later suffered the same injury when he was due to return, only appearing in a match with the under-20 team in January 2013. He was definitely promoted to the first team late in that month, after winning the Copa São Paulo de Futebol Júnior.

On 16 August 2013, after retaining a starting spot under Claudinei Oliveira, Alison renewed his link with Santos until December 2017. However, he suffered an injury during the latter stages of the campaign, and only returned in March 2014.

On 18 July 2014 Alison scored his first professional goal, netting the first of a 2–0 home win against Palmeiras. In February of the following year, however, he suffered another serious knee injury, being sidelined for eight months. He returned to the fields on 29 October, coming on as a late substitute in a 3–1 home win against São Paulo FC.

A backup to Thiago Maia and Renato, Alison only appeared rarely in 2016 before suffering a knee sprain. He went through an arthroscopy in July, being declared fit to play in September.

On 20 January 2017, Alison was loaned to Red Bull Brasil until the end of the 2017 Campeonato Paulista, in order to regain match fitness. Upon returning, he started to feature regularly with the first team under Levir Culpi, becoming a starter after the departure of Thiago Maia to Lille OSC.

Alison made his Copa Libertadores debut on 10 August 2017, starting in a 1–0 home win against Atlético Paranaense. On 5 December, he renewed his contract until the end of 2022.

On 10 November 2020, it was announced that Alison and a further six first team players tested positive for COVID-19. He tested positive for a second time the following 18 January.

=== Al-Hazem ===
On 2 August 2021, Saudi club Al-Hazem reached an agreement with Santos for the transfer of Alison. Santos announced his departure eleven days later, and he was announced by his new club three days after that.

On 20 May 2022, Alison terminated his contract with the club after failing to receive wages, but was still sidelined due to a knee injury.

=== Santos return ===
On 9 February 2023, Santos announced the return of Alison on a one-year contract. He returned to action on 26 April, replacing Rodrigo Fernández in a 1–0 home win over Botafogo-SP, for the year's Copa do Brasil.

Alison became a first-choice in late May 2023, after Fernández's poor form, but suffered another knee injury in June, being sidelined for the remainder of the year. On 4 December, his contract was extended for a further season.

=== Later career ===
On 6 January 2025, Londrina announced the singing of Alison on a one-year contract. He left the club in November, after being a first-choice in their promotion to the Série B and featuring in 36 matches during the year.

On 8 December 2025, Alison signed for Criciúma, but departed the club the following 5 January. The following day, he announced his retirement at the age of 32, alleging "his body asked him to stop" playing.

== International career ==
Alison was a part of the Brazil under-20 side in the 2014 Toulon Tournament, playing in all five matches of the competition as the team won their 8th trophy in the competition. Earlier in that year, he was also called up to the under-23s for a training period, but Santos deemed him unavailable due to his commitments at the club.

On 15 June 2021, Alison was named in the preliminary 50-man list for the 2020 Summer Olympics, but did not make it to the final squad.

== Career statistics ==
Appearances and goals by club, season and competition
Club	Season	League			State League		Cup		Continental		Other		Total	
Club	Season	Division	Apps	Goals	Apps	Goals	Apps	Goals	Apps	Goals	Apps	Goals	Apps	Goals
Santos	2011	Série A	1	0	—		—		—		—		1	0
Santos	2013	Série A	26	0	0	0	3	0	—		—		29	0
Santos	2014	Série A	23	1	5	0	10	0	—		—		38	1
Santos	2015	Série A	3	0	4	0	1	0	—		—		8	0
Santos	2016	Série A	1	0	6	0	2	0	—		—		9	0
Santos	2017	Série A	26	2	—		0	0	3 (Note: Appearance(s) in Copa Libertadores)	0	—		29	2
Santos	2018	Série A	28	0	13	0	2	0	7	0	—		50	0
Santos	2019	Série A	23	0	11	0	6	1	2 (Note: Appearance(s) in Copa Sudamericana)	0	—		42	1
Santos	2020	Série A	20	0	9	0	0	0	9	0	—		38	0
Santos	2021	Série A	6	0	3	0	2	0	8 (Note: Seven appearances in Copa Libertadores, one appearance in Copa Sudamericana)	0	—		19	0
Santos	Subtotal		157	3	51	0	26	1	29	0	—		263	4
Red Bull Brasil (loan)	2017	Série D	0	0	14	0	—		—		—		14	0
Al-Hazem	2021–22	Saudi Professional League	19	0	—		0	0	—		—		19	0
Santos	2023	Série A	5	0	0	0	1	0	2	0	—		8	0
Santos	2024	Série B	1	0	—		—		—		—		1	0
Santos	Subtotal		6	0	0	0	1	0	2	0	—		9	0
Londrina	2025	Série C	22	0	14	0	—		—		—		36	0
Career total			204	3	79	0	27	1	31	0	0	0	341	4

== Honours ==
Santos

- Campeonato Paulista: 2015, 2016
- Campeonato Brasileiro Série B: 2024

Brazil U20

- Toulon Tournament: 2014
