= Caju (footballer, born 1995) =

Brazilian footballer

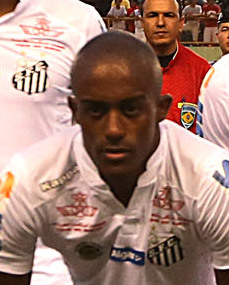
- Caju with Santos in 2016

Personal information
- Full name: Wánderson de Jesus Martins
- Date of birth: 17 July 1995 (age 31)
- Place of birth: Irecê, Brazil
- Height: 1.83 m (6 ft 0 in)
- Position: Left-back

Team information
- Current team: Spartak Subotica
- Number: 13

Youth career
- AA Altair
- 2013–2014: Santos

Senior career*
Years	Team	Apps	(Gls)
2014–2019	Santos	36	(0)
2018–2019	→ APOEL (loan)	25	(0)
2019–2022	Braga	2	(0)
2020	→ Goiás (loan)	16	(0)
2021–2022	→ Aris Limassol (loan)	20	(0)
2022–2025	Aris Limassol	64	(7)
2026–	Spartak Subotica	8	(0)

International career
2015	Brazil U20	11	(0)
- * Club domestic league appearances and goals as of 13 June 2026

Wánderson de Jesus Martins (born 17 July 1995), commonly known as Caju, is a Brazilian professional footballer who plays as a left-back for Serbian club Spartak Subotica.

== Club career ==
=== Santos ===
Born in Irecê, Bahia, Caju graduated from Santos's youth setup, and was promoted to the first-team in September 2014, profiting from the departure of Emerson Palmieri to Palermo and from Eugenio Mena's injury. He stands as the only player who graduated from Peixe Academy 100% owned by the club since 2010.

On 21 September 2014 Caju made his first-team – and Série A – debut, starting in a 3-1 home win against Figueirense. He overtook Mena and Zé Carlos during the latter stages of the campaign, appearing in 11 matches.

On 10 March 2015, after being linked to Udinese and Barcelona, Caju renewed with Peixe, signing until 2019. He spent the campaign as a backup to Zeca. In 2016, as the latter was representing the Brazil under-23s in the Summer Olympics, Caju was made a starter by manager Dorival Júnior, earning plaudits for his performances.

On 15 July 2017, Caju was loaned to French Ligue 1 side Lille for a fee of €500,000, with an obligatory 4 million buyout clause after 15 matches. In September, however, after failing his medical, he returned to his parent club.

==== APOEL (loan) ====
On 22 May 2018, Cypriot side APOEL announced an agreement in principle for the signing of Caju, signing a one-year loan deal with a buyout clause.

=== Braga ===
On 23 July 2019, Caju signed a four-year contract with Primeira Liga side Braga.

=== Aris Limassol ===
On 19 June 2022, Caju was announced at Aris Limassol on a two year contract.

== International career ==
On 27 November 2014 Caju was called up to the Brazil under-20's, alongside Santos teammates Gabriel and Thiago Maia, for the 2015 South American Youth Football Championship. He made his debut for the side on 15 January 2015, starting in a 2–1 win against Chile.

== Career statistics ==
As of 30 June 2025

Appearances and goals by club, season and competition
Club	Season	League			State League		Cup		Continental		Other		Total	
Club	Season	Division	Apps	Goals	Apps	Goals	Apps	Goals	Apps	Goals	Apps	Goals	Apps	Goals
Santos	2014	Série A	11	0	—		2	0	—		—		13	0
Santos	2015	Série A	4	0	0	0	1	0	—		—		5	0
Santos	2016	Série A	11	0	2	0	5	0	—		—		18	0
Santos	2017	Série A	3	0	0	0	1	0	0	0	—		4	0
Santos	2018	Série A	0	0	5	0	0	0	0	0	—		5	0
Santos	Total		29	0	7	0	9	0	0	0	—		45	0
APOEL (loan)	2018–19	Cypriot First Division	25	0	—		2	0	5 (Note: One appearance and one goal in UEFA Champions League, four appearances and one goal in UEFA Europa League)	2	1 (Note: Appearance(s) in Cypriot Super Cup)	0	33	2
Braga	2019–20	Primeira Liga	1	0	—		1	0	2 (Note: Appearance(s) in UEFA Europa League)	0	1 (Note: Appearance(s) in Taça da Liga)	0	5	0
Braga	2020–21	Primeira Liga	1	0	—		0	0	0	0	0	0	1	0
Braga	Total		2	0	—		1	0	2	0	1	0	6	0
Goiás (loan)	2020	Série A	13	0	3	0	2	0	1 (Note: Appearance(s) in Copa Sudamericana)	0	—		19	0
Aris Limassol (loan)	2021–22	Cypriot First Division	20	0	0	0	—		—		—		20	0
Aris Limassol	2022–23	Cypriot First Division	26	2	1	0	—		2	1	—		29	3
Aris Limassol	2023–24	Cypriot First Division	25	4	2	1	—		11	1	1	0	39	6
Aris Limassol	2024–25	Cypriot First Division	13	1	0	0	—		0	0	0	0	13	1
Aris Limassol	2025–26	Cypriot First Division	0	0	0	0	—		4	0	0	0	4	0
Aris Limassol	Total		64	7	3	1	—		17	2	1	0	85	10
Career total			153	7	13	1	14	0	25	4	3	0	208	12

== Honours ==
Santos

- Campeonato Paulista: 2015, 2016
- Copa São Paulo de Futebol Júnior: 2014
- Copa do Brasil Sub-20: 2013
