= 2014 Santos FC season =

Santos
2014 season
- President: Odílio Rodrigues
- Coach: Oswaldo de Oliveira (until 2 September); Enderson Moreira (since 3 September)
- Stadium: Vila Belmiro
- Campeonato Brasileiro: 9th
- Campeonato Paulista: Runners-up
- Copa do Brasil: Semi-finals
- Top goalscorer: League: Gabriel (8); All: Gabriel (21)
- Highest home attendance: 38,043 vs Ituano (13 April 2014)
- Lowest home attendance: 2,321 vs Mixto (16 April 2014)
Home colours	Away colours	Third colours

The 2014 season is Santos Futebol Clube's 102nd season in existence and the club's fifty-fifth consecutive season in the top flight of Brazilian football. As well as the Campeonato Brasileiro, the club competes in the Copa do Brasil and the Campeonato Paulista. This season is the first in history that Santos uses fixed numbers assigned to each player.

On 19 December 2013, Santos signed Leandro Damião from Internacional for a fee of R$ 42 million (€13m) (biggest transfer in history between two Brazilian clubs). At the same time, the club did not spend a cent, as the player's rights were bought by Doyen Sports, an investment fund based in Malta; Damião was later assigned to Peixe in a free transfer, but the club will have to pay the company after the end of Damião's contract, with a 10% interest per year.

This was Oswaldo de Oliveira's second (third in history) season in charge after Claudinei Oliveira was relieved from the club at the end of the 2013 season. He was relieved from his duties on 2 September, after a bad run of results. A day after Oswaldo's dismissal, Santos appointed Enderson Moreira as the club's new manager.

Santos reached Campeonato Paulista's finals for the sixth successive year, but lost to countryside team Ituano in penalties after a 1–1 draw on aggregate score.

On 15 May, Luis Álvaro de Oliveira Ribeiro resigned from the presidency of the club due to health problems, and Odílio Rodrigues (the former vice-president) assumed the position until the end of his term.

== Players ==
=== Squad information ===
As of 8 December 2014

No.	Name	Pos.	Nat.	Place of birth	Date of birth (age)	Club caps	Club goals	Int. caps	Int. goals	Signed from	Date signed	Fee	Contract End
Goalkeepers
1	Aranha	GK	(Brazil)	Pouso Alegre (Minas Gerais)	17 November 1980 (aged 34)	125	0	–	–	Atlético Mineiro	22 December 2010	Free	31 December 2015
12	Vladimir	GK	(Brazil)	Ipiaú (Bahia)	16 July 1989 (aged 25)	18	0	–	–	Youth System	1 January 2009	Free	31 December 2014
22	Gabriel Gasparotto	GK	(Brazil)	Lucélia (São Paulo (state))	9 December 1993 (aged 20)	0	0	–	–	Youth System	9 February 2013	Free	31 December 2016
Defenders
2	Edu Dracena (c)	CB	(Brazil)	Dracena (São Paulo (state))	18 May 1981 (aged 33)	230	18	2	0	Fenerbahçe (Turkey)	16 September 2009	Free	31 December 2015
3	Caju	LB	(Brazil)	Irecê (Bahia)	17 July 1995 (aged 19)	13	0	–	–	Youth System	21 September 2014	Free	31 December 2015
4	Cicinho	RB/RW	(Brazil)	Belém (Pará)	26 December 1988 (aged 25)	84	3	–	–	26 June 2013	R$ 7M	31 December 2018	
6	Gustavo Henrique	CB	(Brazil)	São Paulo (São Paulo (state))	24 March 1993 (aged 21)	38	3	–	–	Youth System	10 January 2013	Free	31 December 2016
13	Victor Ferraz	RB	(Brazil)	João Pessoa (Paraíba)	14 January 1988 (aged 26)	5	0	–	–	Coritiba	18 June 2014	Free	31 December 2015
14	David Braz	CB	(Brazil)	Guarulhos (São Paulo (state))	21 May 1987 (aged 27)	50	6	–	–	Flamengo	15 May 2012	Free	31 December 2015
15	Mena	LB	(Chile)	Viña del Mar	18 July 1988 (aged 26)	62	0	23	3	Univ. de Chile	27 June 2013	R$ 8M	30 June 2017
26	Vinicius Simon	CB	(Brazil)	Limeira (São Paulo (state))	17 November 1986 (aged 28)	26	1	–	–	Youth System	3 August 2008	Free	31 December 2014
28	Neto	CB	(Brazil)	Rio de Janeiro (Rio de Janeiro (state))	16 August 1985 (aged 29)	41	1	–	–	Guarani	8 November 2012	R$ 500K	31 December 2014
36	Jubal	CB	(Brazil)	Inhumas (Goiás)	29 August 1993 (aged 21)	21	1	–	–	Youth System	5 March 2013	Free	31 December 2017
37	Zeca	LB	(Brazil)	Paranavaí (Paraná (state))	16 May 1994 (aged 20)	18	0	–	–	Youth System	25 January 2014	Free	31 December 2017
38	Daniel Guedes	LB	(Brazil)	João Ramalho (São Paulo (state))	2 April 1994 (aged 20)	2	0	–	–	Youth System	19 February 2014	Free	31 December 2017
40	Nailson	CB	(Brazil)	Arapongas (Paraná (state))	24 February 1994 (aged 20)	3	0	–	–	Youth System	25 January 2014	Free	31 December 2014
44	Bruno Uvini	CB	(Brazil)	Capivari (São Paulo (state))	3 June 1991 (aged 23)	14	2	3	0	Napoli (Italy)	29 March 2014	Free	31 December 2014
Midfielders
5	Arouca	DM/CM	(Brazil)	Duas Barras (Rio de Janeiro (state))	11 August 1986 (aged 28)	268	6	4	0	São Paulo	23 July 2010	R$ 8M	31 December 2016
8	Renato	DM	(Brazil)	Santa Mercedes (São Paulo (state))	15 May 1979 (aged 35)	239	26	28	0	Botafogo	13 May 2014	Free	31 December 2014
20	Lucas Lima	AM	(Brazil)	Marília (São Paulo (state))	9 July 1990 (aged 24)	49	5	–	–	Internacional	7 February 2014	R$ 5M	31 December 2017
21	Leandrinho	CM/AM	(Brazil)	Espinosa (Minas Gerais)	25 September 1993 (aged 21)	46	1	–	–	Youth System	5 March 2013	Free	31 December 2017
29	Alison	DM	(Brazil)	Cubatão (São Paulo (state))	1 March 1993 (aged 21)	68	1	–	–	Youth System	9 September 2011	Free	31 December 2017
33	Alan Santos	DM	(Brazil)	Salvador (Bahia)	24 April 1991 (aged 23)	74	2	–	–	Youth System	26 June 2009	Free	31 December 2015
35	Souza	DM/CM	(Brazil)	Posse (Goiás)	8 March 1988 (aged 26)	19	0	–	–	Cruzeiro	5 June 2014	Loan	30 April 2015
41	Serginho	AM	(Brazil)	Monte Aprazível (São Paulo (state))	15 March 1995 (aged 19)	9	0	–	–	Youth System	25 January 2014	Free	31 December 2016
Forwards
7	Robinho	SS	(Brazil)	São Vicente (São Paulo (state))	25 January 1984 (aged 30)	233	104	97	27	Milan (Italy)	5 August 2014	Loan	30 June 2015
9	Leandro Damião	ST	(Brazil)	Jardim Alegre (Paraná (state))	22 July 1989 (aged 25)	44	11	16	3	Internacional	12 December 2013	R$ 41M	31 December 2018
10	Gabriel	SS/ST	(Brazil)	São Bernardo (São Paulo (state))	30 August 1996 (aged 18)	71	23	–	–	Youth System	24 May 2013	Free	30 September 2019
11	Thiago Ribeiro	SS/ST	(Brazil)	Pontes Gestal (São Paulo (state))	24 February 1986 (aged 28)	69	18	–	–	Cagliari (Italy)	20 July 2013	R$ 10M	31 December 2017
17	Patito Rodríguez	RW/AM	(Argentina)	Quilmes	4 May 1990 (aged 24)	44	3	–	–	Independiente (Argentina)	20 July 2012	R$ 3M	31 July 2016
18	Giva	ST	(Brazil)	Cachoeira (Espírito Santo)	3 January 1993 (aged 21)	31	6	–	–	Youth System	22 February 2013	Free	31 December 2014
19	Stéfano Yuri	ST	(Brazil)	Sete Lagoas (Minas Gerais)	27 April 1994 (aged 20)	19	2	–	–	Youth System	19 February 2014	Free	31 December 2017
30	Diego Cardoso	ST	(Brazil)	Ribeirão Preto (São Paulo (state))	6 March 1994 (aged 20)	16	4	–	–	Youth System	25 January 2014	Free	31 December 2016
31	Rildo	SS	(Brazil)	São Paulo (São Paulo (state))	20 March 1989 (aged 25)	41	4	–	–	Ponte Preta	29 January 2014	Loan	31 December 2014
39	Jorge Eduardo	SS	(Brazil)	São Paulo (São Paulo (state))	8 September 1994 (aged 20)	11	0	–	–	Youth System	25 January 2014	Free	31 December 2014
45	Geuvânio	SS	(Brazil)	Ilha das Flores (Sergipe)	5 April 1992 (aged 22)	59	14	–	–	Youth System	6 June 2012	Free	31 December 2017

Source: SantosFC.com.br (for appearances and goals), Wikipedia players' articles (for international appearances and goals), FPF (for contracts)

=== Reserves ===
Note: Flags indicate national team as defined under FIFA eligibility rules; some limited exceptions apply. Players may hold more than one non-FIFA nationality.

No.	Pos.	Nation	Player
16	MF	BRA	Geovane
32	DF	BRA	Paulo Ricardo
34	GK	BRA	João Paulo

No.	Pos.	Nation	Player
46	MF	BRA	Thiago Maia
–	DF	BRA	Crystian
–	DF	BRA	Walace

=== Appearances and goals ===
No.	Pos.	Nat	Name	Campeonato Brasileiro		Campeonato Paulista		Copa do Brasil		Total	
No.	Pos.	Nat	Name	Apps	Goals	Apps	Goals	Apps	Goals	Apps	Goals
1	GK	(Brazil)	Aranha	33	0	17	0	8	0	58	0
22	GK	(Brazil)	Gabriel Gasparotto	0	0	0	0	0	0	0	0
12	GK	(Brazil)	Vladimir	5	0	2	0	3	0	10	0
3	DF	(Brazil)	Caju	11	0	0	0	0 (2)	0	13	0
4	DF	(Brazil)	Cicinho	31 (2)	0	16	0	9	1	58	1
15	DF	(Chile)	Mena	15	0	13 (1)	0	9	0	38	0
37	DF	(Brazil)	Zé Carlos	9 (6)	0	0 (1)	0	1 (1)	0	18	0
38	DF	(Brazil)	Daniel Guedes	2	0	0	0	0	0	2	0
13	DF	(Brazil)	Victor Ferraz	4 (1)	0	0	0	0	0	5	0
44	DF	(Brazil)	Bruno Uvini	10 (1)	2	0	0	3	0	14	2
14	DF	(Brazil)	David Braz	30	3	6 (1)	0	6	3	43	6
2	DF	(Brazil)	Edu Dracena (c)	19	0	0	0	5 (1)	0	25	0
6	DF	(Brazil)	Gustavo Henrique	0	0	8	0	0	0	8	0
36	DF	(Brazil)	Jubal	7 (1)	0	8	1	4	0	20	1
40	DF	(Brazil)	Nailson	0 (1)	0	0	0	1 (1)	0	3	0
28	DF	(Brazil)	Neto	10 (1)	0	16	1	1 (1)	0	29	1
32	DF	(Brazil)	Paulo Ricardo	0 (1)	0	0	0	0 (1)	0	2	0
26	DF	(Brazil)	Vinicius Simon	0	0	0	0	1	0	1	0
33	MF	(Brazil)	Alan Santos	8 (7)	1	8 (4)	0	4 (4)	1	35	2
29	MF	(Brazil)	Alison	23	1	2 (3)	0	9 (1)	0	38	1
5	MF	(Brazil)	Arouca	32	1	17	2	8	1	57	4
21	MF	(Brazil)	Leandrinho	1 (7)	0	4 (4)	0	0 (2)	0	18	0
20	MF	(Brazil)	Lucas Lima	32 (3)	3	1 (3)	1	9 (1)	1	49	5
8	MF	(Brazil)	Renato	7 (4)	0	0	0	1 (2)	0	14	0
41	MF	(Brazil)	Serginho	2 (3)	0	0 (1)	0	0 (3)	0	9	0
35	MF	(Brazil)	Souza	9 (9)	0	0	0	1	0	19	0
46	MF	(Brazil)	Thiago Maia	0 (1)	0	0	0	0	0	1	0
30	FW	(Brazil)	Diego Cardoso	2 (4)	2	0 (5)	2	3 (2)	0	16	4
10	FW	(Brazil)	Gabriel	28 (3)	8	13 (5)	7	7	6	56	21
45	FW	(Brazil)	Geuvânio	11 (13)	4	18	7	5 (1)	3	48	14
18	FW	(Brazil)	Giva	0 (2)	0	0	0	0 (2)	0	4	0
39	FW	(Brazil)	Jorge Eduardo	2 (6)	0	0	0	1 (2)	0	10	0
9	FW	(Brazil)	Leandro Damião	18 (8)	6	13	5	3 (2)	0	44	11
17	FW	(Brazil)	Patito Rodriguez	1 (5)	0	0	0	0 (1)	0	7	0
31	FW	(Brazil)	Rildo	10 (12)	1	3 (10)	1	4 (2)	2	41	4
7	FW	(Brazil)	Robinho	16	4	0	0	5	5	21	9
19	FW	(Brazil)	Stéfano Yuri	1 (7)	0	0 (8)	2	2 (1)	0	19	2
11	FW	(Brazil)	Thiago Ribeiro	18 (3)	4	17	6	4	1	42	11
Players who left the club during the season
—	MF	(Argentina)	Montillo	0	0	1	0	0	0	1	0
—	MF	(Brazil)	Léo Cittadini	0	0	0 (2)	0	0	0	2	0
3	MF	(Brazil)	Léo	0	0	0	0	0 (1)	0	1	0
8	MF	(Brazil)	Cícero	6	2	16	9	0	0	22	11
25	MF	(Brazil)	Lucas Otávio	0	0	0 (2)	0	0	0	2	0
13	DF	(Brazil)	Bruno Peres	1 (1)	0	4 (3)	1	1	0	10	1
17	FW	(Brazil)	Victor Andrade	1 (1)	0	0 (2)	0	0	0	4	0
23	DF	(Brazil)	Emerson Palmieri	3	0	6	2	2	0	11	2

Last updated: 8 December 2014
Source: Match reports in Competitive matches, Soccerway, Campeonato Brasileiro, Campeonato Paulista, Copa do Brasil

=== Goalscorers ===
Ran	No.	Pos	Nat	Name	Brasileirão	Paulistão	Copa do Brasil	Total
1	10	FW	(Brazil)	Gabriel	8	7	6	21
2	45	FW	(Brazil)	Geuvânio	4	7	3	14
3	8	MF	(Brazil)	Cícero	2	9	0	11
3	11	FW	(Brazil)	Thiago Ribeiro	4	6	1	11
3	9	FW	(Brazil)	Leandro Damião	6	5	0	11
4	7	FW	(Brazil)	Robinho	4	0	5	9
5	14	DF	(Brazil)	David Braz	3	0	3	6
6	20	MF	(Brazil)	Lucas Lima	3	1	1	5
7	5	MF	(Brazil)	Arouca	1	2	1	4
7	30	FW	(Brazil)	Diego Cardoso	2	2	0	4
7	31	FW	(Brazil)	Rildo	1	1	2	4
8	23	DF	(Brazil)	Emerson	0	2	0	2
8	19	FW	(Brazil)	Stéfano Yuri	0	2	0	2
8	33	MF	(Brazil)	Alan Santos	1	0	1	2
8	44	DF	(Brazil)	Bruno Uvini	2	0	0	2
9	36	DF	(Brazil)	Jubal	0	1	0	1
9	13	DF	(Brazil)	Bruno Peres	0	1	0	1
9	28	DF	(Brazil)	Neto	0	1	0	1
9	4	DF	(Brazil)	Cicinho	0	0	1	1
9	29	MF	(Brazil)	Alison	1	0	0	1
9	Own goals				0	0	1	1
Total					42	47	25	114

Last updated: 8 December 2014
Source: Match reports in Competitive matches

=== Disciplinary record ===
N	Nat	Pos	Name	Brasileirão			Copa do Brasil			Paulista			Total		
N	Nat	Pos	Name	Yellow card	(yellow card) (yellow-red card)	Red card	Yellow card	(yellow card) (yellow-red card)	Red card	Yellow card	(yellow card) (yellow-red card)	Red card	Yellow card	(yellow card) (yellow-red card)	Red card
4	(Brazil)	DF	Cicinho	11	1	0	2	0	0	5	1	0	18	2	0
14	(Brazil)	DF	David Braz	13	0	0	2	0	0	3	0	0	18	0	0
29	(Brazil)	MF	Alison	11	1	0	2	0	0	2	0	0	15	1	0
33	(Brazil)	MF	Alan Santos	6	0	0	2	0	0	3	0	0	11	0	0
15	(Chile)	DF	Eugenio Mena	4	1	0	2	0	0	3	0	0	9	1	0
2	(Brazil)	DF	Edu Dracena	6	0	0	2	0	0	0	0	0	8	0	0
10	(Brazil)	FW	Gabriel	2	0	0	0	0	0	5	0	0	7	0	0
36	(Brazil)	DF	Jubal	2	0	0	3	0	0	2	0	0	7	0	0
28	(Brazil)	DF	Neto	2	0	0	0	0	0	5	0	0	7	0	0
20	(Brazil)	MF	Lucas Lima	5	0	0	2	0	0	0	0	0	7	0	0
45	(Brazil)	FW	Geuvânio	1	0	1	1	0	0	4	0	0	6	0	1
31	(Brazil)	FW	Rildo	1	0	0	2	0	0	3	0	0	6	0	0
6	(Brazil)	DF	Gustavo Henrique	0	0	0	0	0	0	5	1	0	5	1	0
1	(Brazil)	GK	Aranha	2	0	0	0	0	0	3	0	0	5	0	0
11	(Brazil)	FW	Thiago Ribeiro	0	0	0	1	0	0	3	0	0	4	0	0
12	(Brazil)	GK	Vladimir	2	0	0	1	0	0	1	0	0	4	0	0
7	(Brazil)	FW	Robinho	1	0	0	2	1	0	0	0	0	3	1	0
23	(Brazil)	DF	Emerson	0	0	0	1	0	0	2	0	0	3	0	0
13	(Brazil)	DF	Bruno Peres	0	0	0	0	0	0	2	0	0	2	0	0
18	(Brazil)	FW	Stéfano Yuri	1	0	0	0	0	0	1	0	0	2	0	0
9	(Brazil)	FW	Leandro Damião	1	0	0	0	0	0	1	0	0	2	0	0
17	(Brazil)	FW	Victor Andrade	0	0	0	0	0	0	1	0	0	1	0	0
20	(Brazil)	MF	Leandrinho	0	0	0	0	0	0	1	0	0	1	0	0
8	(Brazil)	MF	Cícero	0	0	0	0	0	0	1	0	0	1	0	0
30	(Brazil)	FW	Diego Cardoso	0	0	0	1	0	0	0	0	0	1	0	0
5	(Brazil)	MF	Arouca	0	0	0	0	0	0	1	0	0	1	0	0
8	(Brazil)	MF	Renato	0	0	0	1	0	0	0	0	0	1	0	0
44	(Brazil)	DF	Bruno Uvini	1	0	0	0	0	0	0	0	0	1	0	0
35	(Brazil)	MF	Souza	1	0	0	0	0	0	0	0	0	1	0	0
13	(Brazil)	DF	Victor Ferraz	1	0	0	0	0	0	0	0	0	1	0	0
3	(Brazil)	DF	Caju	1	0	0	0	0	0	0	0	0	1	0	0
TOTALS				75	3	1	27	1	0	56	2	0	158	6	1

As of 8 December 2014
Source: Campeonato Brasileiro, Campeonato Paulista, Copa do Brasil (yellow card) = Number of bookings; (yellow card) (yellow-red card) = Number of sending offs after a second yellow card; (red card) = Number of sending offs by a direct red card.

=== Suspensions served ===
Date	Matches Missed	Player	Reason	Opponents Missed	Competition
1 February	1	Gabriel	3x (yellow card)	Linense (A)	Campeonato Paulista
1 February	1	Alan Santos	3x (yellow card)	Atlético Sorocaba (H)	Campeonato Paulista
16 February	1	Gustavo Henrique	(yellow card) (yellow-red card) vs Penapolense	Atlético Sorocaba (H)	Campeonato Paulista
6 March	1	Geuvânio	3x (yellow card)	Oeste (H)	Campeonato Paulista
6 March	1	Rildo	3x (yellow card)	Oeste (H)	Campeonato Paulista
6 March	1	Aranha	3x (yellow card)	Oeste (H)	Campeonato Paulista
9 March	1	Thiago Ribeiro	3x (yellow card)	Rio Claro (A)	Campeonato Paulista
9 March	1	Neto	3x (yellow card)	Rio Claro (A)	Campeonato Paulista
30 March	1	Mena	3x (yellow card)	Ituano (A)	Campeonato Paulista
30 March	1	Cicinho	3x (yellow card)	Ituano (A)	Campeonato Paulista
11 May	1	Cicinho	(yellow card) (yellow-red card) vs Figueirense	Atlético Mineiro (H)	Campeonato Brasileiro
15 May	1	Jubal	3x (yellow card)	Londrina (A)	Copa do Brasil
25 May	1	Geuvânio	(red card) vs Flamengo	Bahia (A)	Campeonato Brasileiro
25 May	1	David Braz	3x (yellow card)	Bahia (A)	Campeonato Brasileiro
29 May	1	Alan Santos	3x (yellow card)	Criciúma (H)	Campeonato Brasileiro
1 June	1	Cicinho	3x (yellow card)	Palmeiras (H)	Campeonato Brasileiro
3 August	1	Mena	(red card) vs Internacional	Corinthians (H)	Campeonato Brasileiro
10 August	1	Alison	(red card) vs Corinthians	Cruzeiro (A)	Campeonato Brasileiro
10 August	1	David Braz	3x (yellow card)	Cruzeiro (A)	Campeonato Brasileiro
24 August	1	Gabriel	3x (yellow card)	Botafogo (A)	Campeonato Brasileiro
14 September	1	Alison	3x (yellow card)	Grêmio (A)	Campeonato Brasileiro
21 September	1	David Braz	3x (yellow card)	Atlético Mineiro (A)	Campeonato Brasileiro
26 September	1	Edu Dracena	3x (yellow card)	Goiás (H)	Campeonato Brasileiro
28 September	1	Lucas Lima	3x (yellow card)	Flamengo (A)	Campeonato Brasileiro
1 October	1	Robinho	(yellow card) (yellow-red card) vs Botafogo (A)	Botafogo (H)	Copa do Brasil
12 October	1	Cicinho	3x (yellow card)	Palmeiras (A)	Campeonato Brasileiro
19 October	1	Alison	3x (yellow card)	Fluminense (H)	Campeonato Brasileiro
25 October	1	David Braz	3x (yellow card)	SC Internacional (H)	Campeonato Brasileiro
9 November	1	Edu Dracena	3x (yellow card)	Cruzeiro (H)	Campeonato Brasileiro
19 November	1	Alan Santos	3x (yellow card)	São Paulo (H)	Campeonato Brasileiro

=== Injuries ===
Date	Pos.	Name	Injury	Note	Recovery time
13 January 2014	DF	Edu Dracena	Knee sprain	During training	7 months
29 January 2014	MF	Alan Santos	Myalgia	Match against Corinthians	7 days
29 January 2014	DF	Mena	Knee injury	Match against Corinthians	7 days
25 February 2014	DF	Gustavo Henrique	Knee sprain	During training	8 months
27 February 2014	DF	Mena	Abdominal swelling	Match against Bragantino	3 Weeks
6 March 2014	GK	Aranha	Shoulder injury	Match against Mogi Mirim	2 Weeks
16 March 2014	MF	Arouca	Knee swelling	Match against Rio Claro	10 days
13 April 2014	FW	Thiago Ribeiro	Thigh injury	Match against Ituano	3 days
13 April 2014	MF	Rildo	Ruptured ankle ligament	Match against Ituano	2 months
13 April 2014	FW	Leandro Damião	Adductor injury	Match against Ituano	5 days
13 April 2014	MF	Cícero	Rib injury	Match against Ituano	5 days
20 April 2014	DF	Neto	Thigh strain	Match against Sport	15 days
20 April 2014	MF	Arouca	Posterior thigh pain	Match against Sport	11 days
24 April 2014	DF	Mena	Achilles Tendonitis	During training	3 weeks
8 May 2014	MF	Alan Santos	Thigh muscle injury	Match against Princesa do Solimões	8 days
11 May 2014	DF	Emerson	Thigh injury	Match against Figueirense	1 month
14 May 2014	MF	Cícero	Sore throat	N/A	2 days
14 May 2014	FW	Leandro Damião	Pubis injury	During training	2 months
18 May 2014	FW	Thiago Ribeiro	Stretch knee ligament	Match against Atlético Mineiro	2 months
18 May 2014	MF	Alan Santos	Thigh injury	Match against Atlético Mineiro	8 days
22 May 2014	FW	Gabriel	Thigh injury	Match against Goiás	4 days
25 May 2014	FW	Stéfano Yuri	Thigh injury	Match against Flamengo	3 weeks
1 June 2014	DF	Neto	Low back pain	N/A	3 months
23 June 2014	MF	Rildo	Thigh strain	During training	4 days
5 July 2014	DF	Jubal	Stretch knee	During training	3 weeks
12 July 2014	FW	Leandro Damião	Sprained ankle	During training	3 weeks
31 July 2014	DF	Vinicius Simon	Hip injury	Match against Londrina	5 months
10 August 2014	DF	Bruno Uvini	Sprained ankle	Match against Corinthians	5 days
15 August 2014	MF	Renato	Low back pain	N/A	6 weeks
17 August 2014	DF	Bruno Uvini	Facial trauma	Match against Cruzeiro	6 weeks
20 August 2014	DF	Robinho	Thigh strain	Match against Atlético Paranaense	1 week
6 September 2014	DF	Mena	Thigh strain	Playing for Chile	3 weeks
10 September 2014	FW	Thiago Ribeiro	Back injury	Match against Sport	10 days
21 September 2014	GK	Aranha	Thigh injury	Match against Figueirense	3 weeks
21 September 2014	GK	Thiago Ribeiro	Thigh injury	Match against Goiás	1 month
19 October 2014	MF	Lucas Lima	Thigh injury	Match against Palmeiras	8 days
19 October 2014	MF	Alison	Thigh injury	Match against Palmeiras	8 days
21 October 2014	FW	Thiago Ribeiro	Gastritis	N/A	3 weeks
22 October 2014	FW	Geuvânio	Thigh injury	Match against Fluminense	1 month
22 October 2014	MF	Alan Santos	Low back pain	Match against Fluminense	1 week
29 October 2014	MF	David Braz	Back injury	Match against Cruzeiro	3 weeks
5 November 2014	FW	Robinho	Thigh injury	Match against Cruzeiro	3 weeks
9 November 2014	DF	Victor Ferraz	Back injury	Match against Corinthians	7 weeks
13 November 2014	MF	Arouca	Tonsillitis	N/A	6 days
26 November 2014	FW	Geuvânio	Thigh injury	During training	unknown
30 November 2014	FW	Robinho	Thigh injury	Match against Botafogo	unknown

=== Squad number changes ===
Player	Position	Previous squad number	New squad number	Previous player to wear number	Notes	Source
(Brazil) Renato	MF	35	8	(Brazil) Cícero		
(Brazil) Gabriel	FW	7	10	(Brazil) Geuvânio		
(Brazil) Geuvânio	FW	10	45	Vacant		

== Club ==
=== Coaching staff ===
Position	Staff
Coach	Enderson Moreira
Assistant coach	Edinho; Marcelo Fernandes; Luis Fernando Rosa Flores
Fitness trainer	Marco Alejandro; Fernando Fernandez (Assistant)
Goalkeeping coach	Arzul
Football manager	Zinho

Last updated: 20 September 2014
Source: Santos FC

=== Other staff ===
Position	Staff
Coordinator	Sergio Dimas
Doctors	Dr. Maurício Zenaide; Dr. Ricardo Nobre; Dr. Rodrigo Zogaib
Physiotherapists	Avelino Buongermino; Thiago Lobo; Alex Evangelista
Physiologist	Dr. Luís Fernando de Barros
Performance analyst	Lucas Matheus
Massagist	Clóvis Vesco; Jorginho; Valder Bernardo
Nurse	Sylvio Cruz
Nutritionist	Sandra Merouço
Psychologist	Juliane Fechio
Equipment managers	França; Vagner Salada; Zuca
Security	Formigão; Hector Paulo; Rodrigo; Neto
Scout	Sandro Orlandelli

Last updated: 20 September 2014
Source: Santos FC

=== Club officials ===
Position	Staff
President	Odílio Rodrigues
Vice-President	Luiz Cláudio Aquino
Management Committee	Francisco Cembranelli; José Berenguer; José Paulo Fernandes; Ronald Luiz Monteiro; Thiers Fleming; Júlio Peralta; Alexandre Daoun; Luiz Fernando Fleury

Last updated: 20 September 2014
Source: Santos FC

=== Kit ===
Home	Away	Third

Source: Home Ayaw Third

==== Official sponsorship ====
- Corr Plastik
- CNA Idiomas
- Unicef
- Huawei

== Transfers ==
=== Transfers in ===
Pos.	Name	Age	Moving from	Fee	Source	Notes
DF	(Brazil) David Braz	26	Vitória	Free	Lancenet	Loan return
DF	(Brazil) Vinicius Simon	27	Sport	Free	Globo Esporte	Loan return
DF	(Brazil) Crystian	21	Boa Esporte	Free	Lancenet	Loan return
FW	(Brazil) Leandro Damião	24	Internacional	R$ 41M	Santos FC	
MF	(Brazil) Lucas Lima	23	Internacional	R$ 5M	Globo Esporte	
MF	(Venezuela) Breitner	24	XV de Piracicaba	Free	Lancenet	Loan return
DF	(Brazil) Rafael Caldeira	23	Botafogo–SP	Free	Globo Esporte	Loan return
FW	(Brazil) Tiago Alves	21	Penapolense	Free	Globo Esporte	Loan return
DF	(Brazil) Crystian	21	Paulista	Free	Globo Esporte	Loan return
DF	(Brazil) Walace	21	Guarani	Free	Globo Esporte	Loan return
MF	(Brazil) Renato	34	Botafogo	Free	Santos FC	
DF	(Brazil) Victor Ferraz	26	Coritiba	Free	Globo Esporte	
MF	(Argentina) Patito Rodríguez	24	Estudiantes (Argentina)	Free	Globo Esporte	Loan return
MF	(Brazil) Léo Cittadini	20	Ponte Preta	Free	Santos FC	Loan return

Total spending: ▼ R$46,000,000

=== Loans in ===
P	Name	Age	Loaned from	Loan expires	Source
FW	(Brazil) Rildo	24	Ponte Preta	December 2014	Globo Esporte
DF	(Brazil) Bruno Uvini	22	Napoli (Italy)	December 2014	Globo Esporte
MF	(Brazil) Souza	26	Cruzeiro	May 2015	Cruzeiro EC
FW	(Brazil) Robinho	30	Milan (Italy)	June 2015	Globo Esporte

=== Transfers out ===
Pos.	Name	Age	Moving to	Type	Fee	Source
MF	(Brazil) Marcos Assunção	37	Figueirense	End of contract	Free	Globo Esporte
DF	(Brazil) Durval	33	Sport	End of contract	Free	Globo Esporte
DF	(Brazil) Douglas	20	Icasa	End of contract	Free	Globo Esporte
MF	(Brazil) Renato Abreu	35	Free agent	End of contract	Free	Jornal A Cidade
MF	(Brazil) Renê Júnior	24	Guangzhou Evergrande (China)	Transfer	R$3,2M	Lancenet
FW	(Brazil) Everton Costa	27	Coritiba	Loan return	Free	O Povo
GK	(Brazil) Fábio Costa	36	Retired	End of contract	Free	Gazeta Esportiva
FW	(Brazil) Willian José	22	Real Madrid B (Spain)	Contract terminated	Free	Globo Esporte
MF	(Argentina) Montillo	29	Shandong Luneng (China)	Transfer	R$ 24M	Globo Esporte
MF	(Brazil) Misael	19	Coritiba	Contract terminated	Free	Globo Esporte
DF	(Brazil) Léo	38	Retired	End of contract	Free	UOL Esporte
MF	(Brazil) Cícero	29	Fluminense	Transfer	R$ 2M	Santos FC
FW	(Brazil) Neílton	20	Free agent	End of contract	Free	Globo Esporte
DF	(Brazil) Bruno Peres	24	Torino (Italy)	Transfer	R$4,3M	Santos FC
MF	(Venezuela) Breitner	24	Mineros de Guayana (Venezuela)	Contract terminated	Free	Globo Esporte
MF	(Brazil) Anderson Carvalho	24	Boavista (Portugal)	Contract terminated	Free	Ademir Quintino
FW	(Brazil) Victor Andrade	24	Benfica (Portugal)	Contract terminated	Free	Globo Esporte

Total gaining: ▲ R$ 33,500,000

=== Loans out ===
P	Name	Age	Loaned to	Loan expires	Source
MF	(Venezuela) Breitner	24	XV de Piracicaba	May 2014	Globo Esporte
DF	(Brazil) Rafael Caldeira	22	Botafogo–SP	May 2014	Globo Esporte
FW	(Brazil) Tiago Alves	20	Penapolense	May 2014	Gazeta Esportiva
FW	(Brazil) Dimba	21	Penapolense	May 2014	Lancenet
MF	(Brazil) Pedro Castro	20	Espanyol (Spain)	June 2014	Band Esporte
DF	(Brazil) Rafael Galhardo	22	Bahia	December 2014	Lancenet
DF	(Brazil) Walace	20	Guarani	May 2014	Globo Esporte
DF	(Brazil) Crystian	21	Paulista	May 2014	Globo Esporte
MF	(Brazil) Léo Cittadini	20	Ponte Preta	December 2014	Futebol Interior
MF	(Venezuela) Breitner	24	Boa Esporte	August 2014	Globo Esporte
FW	(Brazil) Dimba	21	Vila Nova	December 2014	Globo Esporte
MF	(Brazil) Lucas Otávio	19	Paraná	December 2014	Santos FC
FW	(Brazil) Tiago Alves	21	Paraná	December 2014	Santos FC
DF	(Brazil) Rafael Caldeira	23	Mirassol	December 2014	Globo Esportel
MF	(Brazil) Pedro Castro	21	Paraná	December 2014	Terra Esporte
DF	(Brazil) Emerson	20	Palermo (Italy)	August 2015	Globo Esporte

=== Contracts ===
No.	Pos.	Nat.	Name	Age	Status	Contract length	Expiry date	Source
3	DF	(Brazil)	Léo	38	Signed	6 months	May 2014	Globo Esporte
25	MF	(Brazil)	Lucas Otávio	19	Signed	3 years	December 2016	Estadão
19	FW	(Brazil)	Stéfano Yuri	19	Signed	4 years	December 2017	Globo Esporte
45	FW	(Brazil)	Geuvânio	21	Signed	4 years	December 2017	Globo Esporte
30	FW	(Brazil)	Diego Cardoso	19	Signed	3 years	December 2016	Santos FC
23	DF	(Brazil)	Emerson	20	Signed	4 years	December 2018	Globo Esporte
41	MF	(Brazil)	Serginho	19	Signed	3 years	December 2016	Santos FC
15	DF	(Chile)	Mena	25	Signed	4 years	June 2017	Santos FC
10	FW	(Brazil)	Gabriel	18	Signed	5 years	September 2019	Globo Esporte

Last updated: 23 September 2014

== Competitions ==
=== Overall ===
Competition	Started round	Final position / round	First match	Last match
Campeonato Brasileiro	—	9th	20 April 2014	7 December 2014
Copa do Brasil	First round	Semi-finals	2 April 2014	5 November 2014
Campeonato Paulista	Group stage	Runners-up	18 January 2014	13 April 2014

Updated to match played 8 December 2014
Source: Competitions

=== Detailed overall summary ===
	Total	Home	Away
Games played	68	35	33
Games won	36	25	11
Games drawn	13	4	9
Games lost	19	6	13
Biggest win	5–0 v Bragantino; 5–0 v Botafogo	5–0 v Bragantino; 5–0 v Botafogo	5–2 v Mogi Mirim
Biggest loss	1–4 v Penapolense; 0–3 v Cruzeiro; 0–3 v Criciúma	1–2 v Atlético Mineiro; 1–2 v Internacional	1–4 v Penapolense; 0–3 v Cruzeiro; 0–3 v Criciúma
Clean sheets	27	17	10
Goals scored	114	76	38
Goals conceded	65	24	41
Goal difference	+49	+52	−3
Average GF per game	1.68	2.17	1.15
Average GA per game	0.96	0.69	1.24
Yellow cards (yellow card)	150	69	81
Red cards (red card)	7	3	4
Most appearances	Aranha (58); Cicinho (58)	Aranha (31); Arouca (31); Gabriel (31)	Cicinho (29)
Top scorer	Gabriel (21)	Gabriel (15)	Gabriel (6)
Worst discipline	Cicinho (yellow card) (16) (red card) (2)	David Braz (yellow card) (10)	Cicinho (yellow card) (10) (red card) (1)
Points	121/204 (59.31%)	79/105 (75.24%)	42/99 (42.42%)
Winning rate	(52.94%)	(71.43%)	(33.33%)

Last updated: 8 December 2014
Source: Competitive matches

=== Campeonato Brasileiro ===
==== Results summary ====
Overall								Home						Away					
Pld	W	D	L	GF	GA	GD	Pts	W	D	L	GF	GA	GD	W	D	L	GF	GA	GD
38	15	8	15	42	35	+7	53	10	3	6	25	12	+13	5	5	9	17	23	−6

Last updated: 8 December 2014.
Source: Soccerway

==== Results by round ====
Round	1	2	3	4	5	6	7	8	9	10	11	12	13	14	15	16	17	18	19	20	21	22	23	24	25	26	27	28	29	30	31	32	33	34	35	36	37	38
Ground	H	A	H	A	H	A	H	A	H	H	A	H	A	H	A	H	A	A	H	A	H	A	H	A	H	A	H	A	A	H	A	H	A	H	A	H	H	A
Result	D	D	D	W	L	D	D	W	W	W	L	W	L	L	L	W	L	L	W	L	W	D	W	L	W	W	W	L	W	L	D	L	L	L	D	L	W	W
Position	7	12	16	11	12	13	13	11	10	5	9	6	6	9	10	7	10	11	9	10	9	9	9	9	8	8	7	7	7	8	8	8	8	9	8	11	10	9

Updated to match(es) played on 8 December 2014. Source: Globo Esporte
W = Win; D = Draw; L = Loss

==== League table ====
Pos	Team	Pld	W	D	L	GF	GA	GD	Pts	Qualification or relegation
7	Grêmio	38	17	10	11	36	24	+12	61	2015 Copa Sudamericana second stage (Note: Teams that will entry in 2015 Copa Sudamericana if they do not reach 2015 Copa do Brasil round of 16. Also the 2014 Copa Verde champion (Brasília FC) and the 2015 Copa do Nordeste champion (Ceará) have a berth guaranteed.)
8	Atlético Paranaense	38	15	9	14	43	42	+1	54	2015 Copa Sudamericana second stage
9	Santos	38	15	8	15	42	35	+7	53	2015 Copa Sudamericana second stage
10	Flamengo	38	14	10	14	46	47	−1	52	2015 Copa Sudamericana second stage
11	Sport	38	14	10	14	36	46	−10	52	2015 Copa Sudamericana second stage

Updated to match(es) played on unknown. Source: Soccerway.com
Rules for classification: 1) points; 2) wins; 3) goal difference; 4) goals scored; 5) head-to-head results; 6) least red cards received; 7) least yellow cards received; 8) draw.

==== Matches ====
20 April 1	Santos	1–1	Sport	Santos
18:30 UTC-03:00	Gabriel 79'; Jubal (yellow card) 90'	Report	(yellow card) 42' Rodrigo Mancha; (yellow card) 54' Ferron; 72' (yellow card) 75' Neto Baiano	Stadium: Vila Belmiro; Attendance: 7,964; Referee: Arílson Bispo da Anunciação (BA)

26 April 2	Coritiba	0–0	Santos	Curitiba
18:30 UTC-03:00	Luccas Claro (yellow card) 46'; Gil (yellow card) 51'; Zé Eduardo (yellow card) 56'	Report	(yellow card) 16' Cicinho; (yellow card) 78' Alison; (yellow card) 80' Alan Santos; (yellow card) 88' Stéfano Yuri	Stadium: Couto Pereira; Attendance: 12,354; Referee: Emerson de Almeida Ferreira (MG)

3 May 3	Santos	0–0	Grêmio	Santos
18:30 UTC-03:00	Alan Santos (yellow card) 25'	Report	(yellow card) 28' Edinho	Stadium: Vila Belmiro; Attendance: 7,934; Referee: Ricardo Marques Ribeiro (MG)

11 May 4	Figueirense	0–2	Santos	Londrina
18:30 UTC-03:00	Nem (yellow card) 51'; Luan (yellow card) 56'; Raul (red card) 66'	Report	43' Gabriel; 61' Arouca; (yellow card) 88' (yellow-red card) 88' Cicinho	Stadium: Estádio do Café; Attendance: 8,518; Referee: Francisco Carlos Nascimento (AL)

18 May 5	Santos	1–2	Atlético Mineiro	Cuiabá
18:30 UTC-03:00	David Braz (yellow card) 27'; Cícero 37'; Neto (yellow card) 39'; Thiago Ribeiro (yellow card) 83'	Report	(yellow card) 68' Emerson Conceição; (yellow card) 71' Victor; 74', 80' André; (yellow card) 87' Leonardo Silva	Stadium: Arena Pantanal; Attendance: 15,600; Referee: Péricles Bassols Pegado Cortez (RJ)

22 May 6	Goiás	2–2	Santos	Goiânia
19:30 UTC-03:00	Alex Alves 25'; Thiago Mendes (yellow card) 37'; Esquerdinha (yellow card) 37'; Erik 68'; David (yellow card) 76'	Report	8' Geuvânio; (yellow card) 11' David Braz; 38' (pen.) Cícero; (yellow card) 90+1' Gabriel	Stadium: Serra Dourada; Attendance: 6,190; Referee: Igor Junio Benevenuto (MG)

25 May 7	Santos	0–0	Flamengo	São Paulo
16:00 UTC-03:00	Jubal (yellow card) 3'; Geuvânio (red card) 75'; David Braz (yellow card) 89'	Report	(yellow card) 23' Samir; (yellow card) 43' Luiz Antônio; (yellow card) 79' Amaral	Stadium: Morumbi; Attendance: 7,193; Referee: Jailson Macêdo Freitas (BA)

29 May 8	Bahia	0–2	Santos	Feira de Santana
21:00 UTC-03:00	Titi (yellow card) 9'; Henrique (yellow card) 31'; Fahel (yellow card) 34'; Guilherme Santos (yellow card) 62'	Report	(yellow card) 12' Cicinho; (yellow card) 25' (goal) 56' Alan Santos; 87' Lucas Lima	Stadium: Joia da Princesa; Attendance: 16,089; Referee: Wagner Reway (MT)

1 June 9	Santos	2–0	Criciúma	São Bernardo do Campo
18:30 UTC-03:00	Gabriel 10'; Diego Cardoso 17'; Cicinho (yellow card) 62'; Aranha (yellow card) 84'	Report	(yellow card) 33' Rodrigo Souza; (yellow card) 46' João Vitor; (yellow card) 71' Lucca; (yellow card) 90' Escudero	Stadium: Primeiro de Maio; Attendance: 5,136; Referee: Paulo Henrique Vollkopf (MS)

17 July 10	Santos	2–0	Palmeiras	Santos
19:30 UTC-03:00	Gabriel (yellow card) 4'; Bruno Uvini 23'; Alison 68'	Report	(yellow card) 25' Wellington; (yellow card) 47' Marcelo Oliveira; (yellow card) 60' Wesley	Stadium: Vila Belmiro; Attendance: 11,774; Referee: Raphael Claus (SP)

20 July 11	Fluminense	1–0	Santos	Volta Redonda
18:30 UTC-03:00	Cícero (yellow card) 61'; Conca 61'; Henrique (yellow card) 90+1'	Report	(yellow card) 88' David Braz	Stadium: Raulino de Oliveira; Attendance: 3,750; Referee: Leandro Vuaden (RS)

26 July 12	Santos	3–0	Chapecoense	Santos
18:30 UTC-03:00	Rildo 12'; Gabriel 51'; David Braz (yellow card) 59'; Alison (yellow card) 68'; Diego Cardoso 79'	Report	(yellow card) 40' Rodrigo Biro	Stadium: Vila Belmiro; Attendance: 6,962; Referee: Péricles Bassols (RJ)

3 August 13	Internacional	1–0	Santos	Porto Alegre
18:30 UTC-03:00	Paulão (red card) 55'; Rafael Moura 56'; Fabrício (yellow card) 85'; Jorge Henrique (yellow card) 86'; Ygor (yellow card) 90+3'	Report	(yellow card) 38' Lucas Lima; (red card) 70' Mena	Stadium: Beira-Rio; Attendance: 20,258; Referee: Wilton Pereira Sampaio (GO)

10 August 14	Santos	0–1	Corinthians	Santos
16:00 UTC-03:00	Lucas Lima (yellow card) 13'; Alison (yellow card) 38' (yellow-red card); David Braz (yellow card) 39'	Report	(yellow card) 14' Guerrero; (yellow card) 30' (goal) 84' Gil; (yellow card) 45' Fábio Santos	Stadium: Vila Belmiro; Attendance: 12,329; Referee: Raphael Claus (SP)

17 August 15	Cruzeiro	3–0	Santos	Belo Horizonte
16:00 UTC-03:00	Éverton Ribeiro (yellow card) 20'; Marcelo Moreno 24'; Mayke (yellow card) 46'; Ricardo Goulart 47'; Júlio Baptista 87' (yellow card) 88'	Report	(yellow card) 53' Alan Santos	Stadium: Mineirão; Attendance: 39,215; Referee: Leandro Vuaden (RS)

20 August 16	Santos	2–0	Atlético Paranaense	Santos
19:30 UTC-03:00	Leandro Damião 44'; Thiago Ribeiro 66'	Report	(yellow card) 14' Léo Pereira; (yellow card) 46' Dráusio	Stadium: Vila Belmiro; Attendance: 4,612; Referee: Igor Junio Benevenuto (MG)

24 August 17	São Paulo	2–1	Santos	São Paulo
16:00 UTC-03:00	Alexandre Pato (yellow card) 1' (goal) 88'; Ganso 23' (yellow card) 68'; Toloi (yellow card) 64'; Paulo Miranda (yellow card) 72'; Álvaro Pereira (yellow card) 84'	Report	(yellow card) 71' David Braz; (yellow card) 73' Vladimir; 85' (pen.) (yellow card) 86' Gabriel	Stadium: Morumbi; Attendance: 31,159; Referee: Vinicius Furlan (SP)
Note: Vladimir was booked on the bench

31 August 18	Botafogo	1–0	Santos	Rio de Janeiro
16:00 UTC-03:00	Edílson (yellow card) 41'; Daniel 62'; Emerson (yellow card) 68'	Report	(yellow card) 56' Edu Dracena; (yellow card) 90+5' Cicinho	Stadium: Maracanã; Attendance: 12,221; Referee: Rodrigo D'Alonso Ferreira (SC)

6 September 19	Santos	3–1	Vitória	São Paulo
18:30 UTC-03:00	David Braz 46', 51'; Leandro Damião 74'; Edu Dracena (yellow card) 79'	Report	(yellow card) 8' Luiz Gustavo; (yellow card) 17' Nino Paraíba; (yellow card) 21' Matheus Salustiano; (yellow card) 59' Ednei; 64' Dinei; (yellow card) 75' Juan; (yellow card) 75' Roberto Fernández	Stadium: Pacaembu; Attendance: 14,205; Referee: Felipe Gomes da Silva (PR)

10 September 20	Sport	3–1	Santos	São Lourenço da Mata
21:00 UTC-03:00	Ibson (yellow card) 25'; Renê (yellow card) 29'; Patric 40', 51', 90+1'; Wendel (yellow card) 48'; Vítor (yellow card) 69'; Danilo (yellow card) 78'	Report	24' Thiago Ribeiro; (yellow card) 33' Alan Santos	Stadium: Arena Pernambuco; Attendance: 14,787; Referee: Graziani Maciel Rocha (RJ)

13 September 21	Santos	2–1	Coritiba	Santos
21:00 UTC-03:00	Lucas Lima 13'; Alison (yellow card) 28'; Robinho 38'; Cicinho (yellow card) 59'; Leandro Damião (yellow card) 74'; David Braz (yellow card) 77'	Report	(yellow card) 6' Carlinhos; (yellow card) 52' Hélder; (yellow card) 60' Zé Eduardo; 87' Dudu	Stadium: Vila Belmiro; Attendance: 7,705; Referee: Marcelo de Lima Henrique (RJ)

18 September 22	Grêmio	0–0	Santos	Porto Alegre
20:30 UTC-03:00	Matheus Biteco (yellow card) 35'; Ramiro (yellow card) 41'	Report		Stadium: Arena do Grêmio; Attendance: 21,107; Referee: Ricardo Marques Ribeiro (MG)

21 September 23	Santos	3–1	Figueirense	Santos
18:30 UTC-03:00	Leandro Damião 39'; Robinho 56'; David Braz (yellow card) 83'; Lucas Lima 88'	Report	(yellow card) 6' Marquinhos; 45+2' (pen.) Giovanni Augusto; (yellow card) 58' Paulo Roberto	Stadium: Vila Belmiro; Attendance: Elmo Alves Resende Cunha (GO); Referee: 5,571

25 September 24	Atlético Mineiro	3–2	Santos	Belo Horizonte
20:30 UTC-03:00	Diego Tardelli 11', 53'; Cicinho 23' (o.g.); Pierre (yellow card) 80'; Carlos (yellow card) 81'; André (yellow card) 88'	Report	(yellow card) 40' Alison; (yellow card) 51' Edu Dracena; 59' Thiago Ribeiro; 83' Geuvânio; (yellow card) 88' Neto	Stadium: Estádio Independência; Attendance: 16,772; Referee: Rodrigo D'Alonso Ferreira (SC)

28 September 25	Santos	2–0	Goiás	São Paulo
18:30 UTC-03:00	David Braz 13'; Geuvânio 62'; Lucas Lima (yellow card) 73'	Report	(yellow card) 51' Jackson; (yellow card) 80' Esquerdinha	Stadium: Pacaembu; Attendance: 11,379; Referee: Héber Roberto Lopes (PR)

4 October 26	Flamengo	0–1	Santos	Rio de Janeiro
16:20 UTC-03:00	Víctor Cáceres (yellow card) 41'; Canteros (yellow card) 55'; Éverton (yellow card) 76'	Report	24' Robinho; (yellow card) 83' Alison; (yellow card) 85' Vladimir	Stadium: Maracanã; Attendance: 37,204; Referee: Marielson Alves da Silva (BA)

9 October 27	Santos	1–0	Bahia	Santos
19:30 UTC-03:00	Leandro Damião 10'; David Braz (yellow card) 45'	Report	(yellow card) 45' Kieza	Stadium: Vila Belmiro; Attendance: 6,184; Referee: Jean Pierre Gonçalves Lima (RS)

12 October 28	Criciúma	3–0	Santos	Criciúma
18:30 UTC-03:00	Cléber Santana (yellow card) 5'; Joílson 16'; Rodrigo Souza 22' (yellow card) 79'; João Vitor (yellow card) 48'; Lucca 60'; Ronaldo Alves (yellow card) 73'	Report	(yellow card) 44' Cicinho	Stadium: Heriberto Hülse; Attendance: 9,276; Referee: Péricles Bassols Pegado Cortez (RJ)

19 October 29	Palmeiras	1–3	Santos	São Paulo
16:00 UTC-02:00	Valdivia (yellow card) 7'; Wesley (yellow card) 45+2'; Henrique (yellow card) 81' (goal) 85'	Report	(yellow card) 31' Alison; 38' (yellow card) 73' Geuvânio; 41', 48' Gabriel; (yellow card) 55' Mena; (yellow card) 60' Robinho; (yellow card) 67' David Braz; (yellow card) 90+1' Edu Dracena	Stadium: Pacaembu; Attendance: 33,034; Referee: Flávio Rodrigues de Souza (SP)

22 October 30	Santos	0–1	Fluminense	Santos
22:00 UTC-02:00	Rildo (yellow card) 29'; Mena (yellow card) 71'	Report	(yellow card) 73' Guilherme Mattis; 90' Edson	Stadium: Vila Belmiro; Attendance: 6,178; Referee: Francisco Carlos do Nascimento (AL)

25 October 31	Chapecoense	1–1	Santos	Chapecó
18:30 UTC-02:00	Abuda (yellow card) 22'; Leandro 90'	Report	8' (yellow card) 27' Bruno Uvini; (yellow card) 24' David Braz; (yellow card) 50' Cicinho; (yellow card) 85' Souza	Stadium: Arena Condá; Attendance: 10,334; Referee: Anderson Daronco (RS)

2 November 32	Santos	1–2	Internacional	Santos
17:00 UTC-02:00	Edu Dracena (yellow card) 49'; Gabriel 62'; Cicinho (yellow card) 76'	Report	(yellow card) 25' Fabrício; (yellow card) 45' Jorge Henrique; 24', 80' (yellow card) 88' Aránguiz; (yellow card) 60' Alan Patrick; (yellow card) 74' Alisson Becker	Stadium: Vila Belmiro; Attendance: 5,607; Referee: Jaílson Macedo Freitas (BA)

9 November 33	Corinthians	1–0	Santos	São Paulo
19:30 UTC-02:00	Guerrero 7'; Fagner (yellow card) 58'; Elias (yellow card) 64'	Report	(yellow card) 33' Victor Ferraz; (yellow card) 63' Edu Dracena	Stadium: Arena Corinthians; Attendance: 31,357; Referee: Vinicius Furlan (SP)

16 November 34	Santos	0–1	Cruzeiro	Santos
17:00 UTC-02:00	Lucas Lima (yellow card) 62'; Alison (yellow card) 68'	Report	52' Ricardo Goulart; (yellow card) 55' Henrique	Stadium: Vila Belmiro; Attendance: 4,094; Referee: Alinor Silva Paixão (MT)

19 November 35	Atlético Paranaense	1–1	Santos	Curitiba
19:30 UTC-02:00	Cleberson (yellow card) 33' (goal) 49'; Sueliton (yellow card) 45'	Report	27' Robinho; (yellow card) 88' Alan Santos	Stadium: Arena da Baixada; Attendance: 16,484; Referee: Arnoldo Figarela (RO)

23 November 36	Santos	0–1	São Paulo	Cuiabá
17:00 UTC-02:00	Lucas Lima (yellow card) 37'; Edu Dracena (yellow card) 63'; Alison (yellow card) 86'	Report	9' Boschilia; (yellow card) 78' Osvaldo	Stadium: Arena Pantanal; Attendance: 34,147; Referee: Flávio Rodrigues Guerra (SP)

30 November 37	Santos	2–0	Botafogo	Santos
17:00 UTC-02:00	Leandro Damião 47', 89'; Caju (yellow card) 77'	Report	(yellow card) 58' Júnior César	Stadium: Vila Belmiro; Attendance: 4,269; Referee: Paulo Henrique de Godoy Bezerra (SC)

7 December 38	Vitória	0–1	Santos	Salvador
17:00 UTC-02:00		Report	(yellow card) 72' Alison; (yellow card) 80' Cicinho; (yellow card) 90' Aranha; 90+4' Thiago Ribeiro	Stadium: Barradão; Attendance: 8,780; Referee: Anderson Daronco (RS)

=== Copa do Brasil ===
==== First round ====
2 April 1st leg	Mixto	0–0	Santos	Cuiabá
22:00 UTC-03:00	Italo (yellow card) 39'; Ruy (yellow card) 57'	Report	(yellow card) 22' Jubal; (yellow card) 40' Mena; (yellow card) 49' Diego Cardoso; (yellow card) 90+2' Cicinho	Stadium: Arena Pantanal; Attendance: 20,000; Referee: Eduardo Valadão (GO)

16 April 2nd leg	Santos	3–0 (3–0 agg.)	Mixto	Santos
22:00 UTC-03:00	Alan Santos (yellow card) 19'; Arouca 59'; Cicinho (yellow card) 62'; Gabriel 68', 82'	Report	(yellow card) 33' Ruy; (yellow card) 40' João Paulo; (yellow card) 63' Denilson; (yellow card) 65' Ricardo Ehle; (yellow card) 67' Igor; (yellow card) 71' Buiu Ferreira	Stadium: Vila Belmiro; Attendance: 2,321; Referee: Braulio da Silva Machado (SC)

==== Second round ====
8 May 1st leg	Princesa do Solimões	1–2	Santos	Manaus
21:50 UTC-03:00	Clayton He-Man (yellow card) 21'; Branco 47'; Cleyton Amaral (yellow card) 49'; Rondinelle (yellow card) 85'; Deurick (yellow card) 90'	Report	4' Gabriel; 9' Alan Santos; (yellow card) 26' Jubal; (yellow card) 33' Alison	Stadium: Arena da Amazônia; Attendance: 19,475; Referee: Caio Max Augusto Vieira (RN)

15 May 2nd leg	Santos	4–2 (6–3 agg.)	Princesa do Solimões	Santos
21:50 UTC-03:00	Gabriel 18'; Cicinho 24'; Clayton He-Man 54' (o.g.); Jubal (yellow card) 65'; Thiago Ribeiro 70'	Report	38' Michell Parintins; 58' (yellow card) 59' Deurick; (yellow card) 60' Clayton He-Man	Stadium: Vila Belmiro; Attendance: 3,781; Referee: Pablo Ramon Gonçalves Pinheiro (RN)

==== Third round ====
31 July 1st leg	Londrina	2–1	Santos	Londrina
21:00 UTC-03:00	Paulinho (yellow card) 10'; Joel 23', 89' (yellow card) 90'; Celsinho (yellow card) 24'; Vitor (yellow card) 86'; Dirceu (yellow card) 86'; Diogo Roque (yellow card) 90+1'	Report	(yellow card) 12' Alan Santos; (yellow card) 36' Renato; 85' Geuvânio; (yellow card) 90+1' Emerson	Stadium: Estádio do Café; Attendance: 14,334; Referee: Igor Junior Benevenuto (MG)

14 August 2nd leg	Santos	2–0 (3–2 agg.)	Londrina	Santos
19:30 UTC-03:00	Thiago Ribeiro (yellow card) 23'; Robinho 52'; Lucas Lima (yellow card) 74'; Rildo 88' (yellow card) 90+2'	Report	(yellow card) 13' Paulinho; (yellow card) 29' Bidía; (yellow card) 62' Diogo Roque; (yellow card) 76' Dirceu	Stadium: Vila Belmiro; Attendance: 4,499; Referee: Wendel de Paiva Gouveia (RJ)

==== Round of 16 ====
28 August 1st leg	Grêmio	0–2	Santos	Porto Alegre
20:00 UTC-03:00	Ramiro (yellow card) 40'; Pará (yellow card) 87'	Report	37' (yellow card) 83' David Braz; 45' Robinho; (yellow card) 53' Edu Dracena; (yellow card) 59' Alison	Stadium: Arena do Grêmio; Attendance: 28,091; Referee: Wilton Pereira Sampaio (GO)

– 2nd leg	Santos	– (2–0 agg.)	Grêmio	Santos
–				Stadium: Vila Belmiro
Note: Grêmio was eliminated from the competition due to racist acts of its home crowd against Santos' goalkeeper Aranha in the first leg.

==== Quarter-finals ====
1 October 1st leg	Botafogo	2–3	Santos	Rio de Janeiro
19:30 UTC-03:00	Gabriel 25'; Júnior César (yellow card) 26'; Zeballos 56'; Dankler (yellow card) 62'; Bolívar (yellow card) 70'	Report	24', 28' (yellow card) 34' (yellow-red card) 84' Robinho; 42' (yellow card) 60' Geuvânio; (yellow card) 59' David Braz; (yellow card) 90+3' Vladimir	Stadium: Maracanã; Attendance: 8,714; Referee: Dewson Fernando Freitas da Silva (PA)

16 October 2nd leg	Santos	5–0 (8–2 agg.)	Botafogo	São Paulo
21:30 UTC-03:00	Gabriel 5'; David Braz 9', 62'; Lucas Lima 37'; Geuvânio 58'	Report	(yellow card) 60' (yellow-red card) 87' Matheus Menezes; (yellow card) 61' Dankler	Stadium: Pacaembu; Attendance: 13,459; Referee: Héber Roberto Lopes (PR)

==== Semi-finals ====
29 October 1st leg	Cruzeiro	1–0	Santos	Belo Horizonte
22:00 UTC-02:00	Willian 10'	Report	(yellow card) 56' Mena; (yellow card) 84' Edu Dracena	Stadium: Mineirão; Attendance: 27,220; Referee: Marcelo de Lima Henrique (RJ)

5 November 2nd leg	Santos	3–3 (3–4 agg.)	Cruzeiro	Santos
22:00 UTC-02:00	Robinho 1'; Rildo (yellow card) 43' (goal) 58'; Gabriel 45+2' (pen.); Lucas Lima (yellow card) 76'	Report	7' Marcelo Moreno; (yellow card) 40' (goal) 80', 90+4' Willian; (yellow card) 45' Egídio; (yellow card) 65' Lucas Silva; (yellow card) 89' Fábio	Stadium: Vila Belmiro; Attendance: 11,952; Referee: Dewson Fernando Freitas da Silva (PA)

=== Campeonato Paulista ===
==== Results summary ====
Overall								Home						Away					
Pld	W	D	L	GF	GA	GD	Pts	W	D	L	GF	GA	GD	W	D	L	GF	GA	GD
19	14	3	2	47	19	+28	45	11	0	0	34	7	+27	3	3	2	13	12	+1

Last updated: 14 April 2014.
Source: Soccerway

==== Group stage ====
Pos	Team	Pld	W	D	L	GF	GA	GD	Pts
1	Santos	15	11	3	1	39	16	+23	36
2	Ponte Preta	15	8	0	7	17	23	−6	24
3	São Bernardo	15	6	5	4	23	18	+5	23
4	Portuguesa	15	6	2	7	23	19	+4	20
5	Paulista	15	0	4	11	14	31	−17	4

Source: Globo Esporte

===== Results by round =====
Round	1	2	3	4	5	6	7	8	9	10	11	12	13	14	15
Ground	H	A	A	H	H	A	H	A	H	A	H	A	H	A	H
Result	W	D	W	W	W	W	W	L	W	D	W	W	W	D	W
Position	1	2	2	1	1	1	1	1	1	1	1	1	1	1	1

Updated to match(es) played on 23 March 2014. Source: Globo Esporte
W = Win; D = Draw; L = Loss

===== Matches =====
18 January 1	Santos	1–0	XV de Piracicaba	Santos
19:30 UTC-02:00	Gabriel (yellow card) 30' (goal) 41'; Geuvânio (yellow card) 45'	Report	(yellow card) 40' Alan Bahia; (yellow card) 60' Danilo Sacramento	Stadium: Vila Belmiro; Attendance: 7,895; Referee: Vinícius Gonçalves Dias Araújo (SP)

21 January 2	Audax	1–1	Santos	São Paulo
19:30 UTC-02:00	Caion 13'; Tchê Tchê (yellow card) 64'	Report	(yellow card) 48' Bruno Peres; (yellow card) 62' Victor Andrade; 87' Jubal	Stadium: Pacaembu; Attendance: 2,284; Referee: Marcelo Prieto Alfieri (SP)

26 January 3	Ituano	0–1	Santos	Itu
19:30 UTC-02:00	Josa (yellow card) 2'; Cristian (yellow card) 28'; Jackson Caucaia (yellow card) 83'; Alemão (yellow card) 90+1'	Report	(yellow card) 9' Gabriel; (yellow card) 25' Alan Santos; (yellow card) 59' Mena; (yellow card) 78' Thiago Ribeiro; 90+1' Cícero; (yellow card) 90+2' Aranha	Stadium: Estádio Novelli Júnior; Attendance: 2,527; Referee: Marcelo Rogério (SP)

29 January 4	Santos	5–1	Corinthians	Santos
22:00 UTC-02:00	Arouca 12'; Gabriel Barbosa 22'; Thiago Ribeiro 47', 77'; Leandrinho (yellow card) 61'; Bruno Peres 62'	Report	23' Guilherme; (yellow card) 65' Emerson; (yellow card) 65' Guerrero	Stadium: Vila Belmiro; Attendance: 8,050; Referee: Paulo César de Oliveira (SP)

1 February 5	Santos	5–1	Botafogo–SP	Santos
19:30 UTC-02:00	Geuvânio 4'; Emerson (yellow card) 42' (goal) 89'; Cícero 45'; Neto (yellow card) 54'; Gabriel 65', 68' (yellow card) 69'	Report	(yellow card) 19' (goal) 50' Hudson	Stadium: Vila Belmiro; Attendance: 5,983; Referee: Flavio Rodrigues Guerra (SP)

6 February 6	Linense	1–2	Santos	Lins
21:00 UTC-02:00	João Lucas (yellow card) 44'; Renan (yellow card) 59'; Rodrigo Tiuí 61'	Report	(yellow card) 11' Alan Santos; (yellow card) 57' Gustavo Henrique; 59' Thiago Ribeiro; 83' Stéfano Yuri; (yellow card) 90+3' Aranha	Stadium: Gilbertão; Attendance: 5,701; Referee: Marcelo Aparecido Ribeiro de Souza (SP)

11 February 7	Santos	2–0	Comercial–SP	Santos
19:30 UTC-02:00	Geuvânio 12', 40'; Leandro Damião (yellow card) 59'; Gustavo Henrique (yellow card) 75'	Report	(yellow card) 49' (yellow-red card) 67' Willian Simões	Stadium: Vila Belmiro; Attendance: 6,865; Referee: Marcio Henrique Gois (SP)

16 February 8	Penapolense	4–1	Santos	Penápolis
18:30 UTC-03:00	Guarú 9'; Douglas Tanque 51' (yellow card) 65'; Petros 84' (red card) 88'; Alexandro 86'	Report	(yellow card) 30' (yellow-red card) 68' Gustavo Henrique; 44' Cícero; (yellow card) 50' Alan Santos; (yellow card) 58' Mena	Stadium: Tenente Carriço; Attendance: 6,353; Referee: José Claudio Rocha Filho (SP)

20 February 9	Santos	2–1	Atlético Sorocaba	Santos
19:30 UTC-03:00	Thiago Ribeiro (yellow card) 23'; Leandro Damião 47'; Jubal (yellow card) 73'; Rildo (yellow card) 84'; Cícero 90'	Report	70' (yellow card) 78' Danilo Alves	Stadium: Vila Belmiro; Attendance: 4,353; Referee: Leandro Bizzio Marinho (SP)

23 February 10	São Paulo	0–0	Santos	São Paulo
16:00 UTC-03:00	Rodrigo Caio (yellow card) 4'; Álvaro Pereira (yellow card) 13'; Osvaldo (yellow card) 33'	Report	(yellow card) 20' Geuvânio; (yellow card) 24' Neto; (yellow card) 50' Cicinho; (yellow card) 56' Gustavo Henrique	Stadium: Morumbi; Attendance: 16,337; Referee: Marcelo Aparecido Ribeiro de Souza (SP)

27 February 11	Santos	5–0	Bragantino	Santos
21:00 UTC-03:00	Rildo (yellow card) 28'; Cícero 42'; Jubal (yellow card) 44'; Gabriel 47'; Geuvânio 51', 68'; Leandro Damião 78'	Report	(yellow card) 13' (yellow-red card) 22' Yago; (yellow card) 59' Gustavo; (yellow card) 84' André Astorga	Stadium: Vila Belmiro; Attendance: 3,454; Referee: Raphael Claus (SP)

6 March 12	Mogi Mirim	2–5	Santos	Mogi Mirim
21:00 UTC-03:00	Fernando Baiano 22'; Edson Ratinho (yellow card) 58'; Magrão 66'	Report	(yellow card) 36' Geuvânio; 42' Emerson; (yellow card) 58' Cícero; 55' Leandro Damião; 67' (yellow card) 68' Rildo; (yellow card) 80' Aranha; 82' Arouca; 90' Lucas Lima	Stadium: Romildão; Attendance: 3,189; Referee: Vinicius Gonçalves Dias Araujo (SP)

9 March 13	Santos	4–1	Oeste	Santos
18:30 UTC-03:00	Leandro Damião 21'; Gabriel (yellow card) 39'; Thiago Ribeiro 59', 75' (yellow card) 89'; Diego Cardoso 82'; Neto (yellow card) 90'	Report	(yellow card) 19' Paes; (yellow card) 35' (goal) 90+1' Eric; (yellow card) 85' Mauro Viana	Stadium: Vila Belmiro; Attendance: 6,338; Referee: Flavio Rodrigues Guerra (SP)

16 March 14	Rio Claro	3–3	Santos	Rio Claro
18:30 UTC-03:00	Renan Diniz 42', 69'; Léo Costa 71'; Nando Carandina (yellow card) 74'; Wendell (yellow card) 87'	Report	21' Geuvânio; (yellow card) 37' Cicinho; 50' Gabriel; 74' Cícero; (yellow card) 83' David Braz; (yellow card) 89' Stéfano Yuri	Stadium: Augusto Schmidt; Attendance: 8,754; Referee: Thiago Duarte Peixoto (SP)

23 March 15	Santos	2–1	Palmeiras	Santos
16:00 UTC-03:00	Neto 24' (yellow card) 90+3'; Thiago Ribeiro 35' (yellow card) 90+4'; Gabriel (yellow card) 53'; Alison (yellow card) 56'; Bruno Peres (yellow card) 67'	Report	(yellow card) 23' Valdivia; (yellow card) 73' Eguren; 87' Alan Kardec	Stadium: Vila Belmiro; Attendance: 12,179; Referee: Paulo César de Oliveira (SP)

==== Knockout stage ====
===== Quarter-final =====
26 March Quarter-final	Santos	4–0	Ponte Preta	Santos
19:30 UTC-03:00	Cícero 21'; Geuvânio 49'; Gabriel 60'; Alison (yellow card) 77'; Diego Cardoso 80'	Report		Stadium: Vila Belmiro; Attendance: 10,039; Referee: Vinicius Furlan (SP)

===== Semi-final =====
30 March Semi-final	Santos	3–2	Penapolense	Santos
16:00 UTC-03:00	Mena (yellow card) 10'; Cícero 21'; Cicinho (yellow card) 23'; David Braz (yellow card) 25'; Leandro Damião 60'; Stéfano Yuri 86'; Geuvânio (yellow card) 87'	Report	26' (yellow card) 33' Guarú; 35' Douglas Tanque; (yellow card) 37' Rodrigo Biro; (yellow card) 49' Samuel	Stadium: Vila Belmiro; Attendance: 12,409; Referee: Marcelo Rogério (SP)

===== Finals =====
6 April 1st leg	Ituano	1–0	Santos	São Paulo
16:00 UTC-03:00	Cristian 20'; Dick (yellow card) 31'; Jackson Caucaia (yellow card) 60'	Report	(yellow card) 40' Neto	Stadium: Pacaembu; Attendance: 27,114; Referee: Rodrigo Guarizo do Amaral (SP)

13 April 2nd leg	Santos	1–0 (1–1 agg.) (6–7 p)	Ituano	São Paulo
16:00 UTC-03:00	Cicinho (yellow card) 37' (yellow-red card) 90+1'; Cícero 45+1'; David Braz (yellow card) 81'; Arouca (yellow card) 89'	Report	(yellow card) 8' Rafael Silva; (yellow card) 13' Esquerdinha; (yellow card) 21' Cristian; (yellow card) 90+2' Dener	Stadium: Pacaembu; Attendance: 38,043; Referee: Raphael Claus (SP)
	Penalties
	Cícero (penalty scored); Alan Santos (penalty scored); David Braz (penalty scored); Rildo (penalty missed); Gabriel (penalty scored); Arouca (penalty scored); Alison (penalty scored); Neto (penalty missed)		(penalty scored) Jackson Caucaia; (penalty missed) Anderson Salles; (penalty scored) Marcelinho; (penalty scored) Esquerdinha; (penalty scored) Marcinho; (penalty scored) Jean Carlos; (penalty scored) Dener; (penalty scored) Josa
