= Niedzielski =

Niedzielski (feminine Niedzielska) is a Polish surname. Notable people with the surname include:

- Adam Niedzielski (born 1973), Polish economist and politician
- Luan José Niedzielski (born 1991), Brazilian footballer
- Stanisław Niedzielski, Polish pianist
