= Geuvânio =

Brazilian footballer (born 1992)

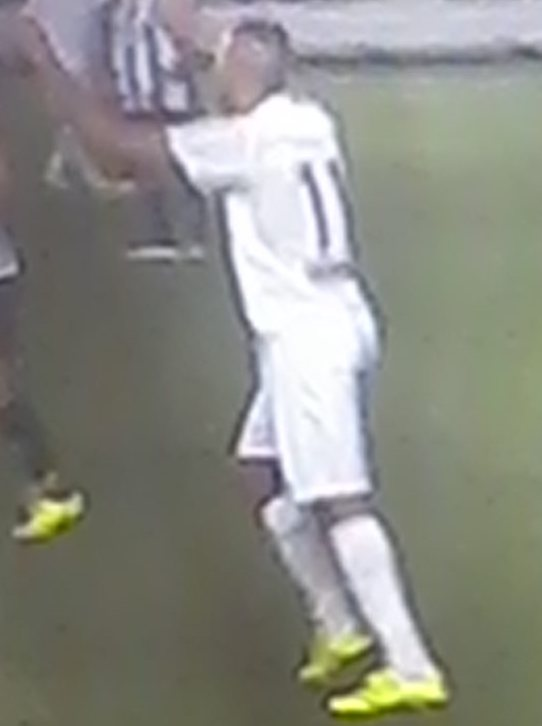
- Geuvânio playing for Santos in 2015

Personal information
- Full name: Geuvânio Santos Silva
- Date of birth: 5 April 1992 (age 34)
- Place of birth: Ilha das Flores, Brazil
- Height: 1.75 m (5 ft 9 in)
- Position: Forward

Team information
- Current team: Amazonas

Youth career
- Litoral FC
- Santos
- Monte Alegre FC
- 2009–2010: → Santos (loan)
- 2010–2011: Jabaquara
- 2011: → Santos (loan)

Senior career*
Years	Team	Apps	(Gls)
2011–2015	Santos	98	(20)
2013	→ Penapolense (loan)	11	(1)
2016–2019	Tianjin Tianhai	34	(9)
2017–2018	→ Flamengo (loan)	34	(2)
2019	Atlético Mineiro	29	(1)
2020–2021	Athletico Paranaense	12	(1)
2021	Chapecoense	40	(4)
2022	Náutico	14	(4)
2023	Ituano	0	(0)
2023	Juventude	2	(0)
2025	Osasco Sporting	4	(0)
2026	Votoraty	5	(0)
2026–	Amazonas	1	(0)
- * Club domestic league appearances and goals as of 10 November 2026

Geuvânio Santos Silva (born 5 April 1992), simply known as Geuvânio, is a Brazilian professional footballer who plays as a forward for Amazonas.

== Club career ==
=== Santos ===
Born in Ilha das Flores, Sergipe, Geuvânio appeared the most of his youth career with Santos' youth system, but also appeared with some lower clubs in the process. On 6 June 2012 he made his first-team – and Série A – debut, coming on as a late substitute in a 1–1 home draw against Fluminense.

On 1 August, after being sparingly used, Geuvânio almost rescinded his link with Santos and joined Académica de Coimbra. However, the deal fell through a day later.

On 19 January 2013 Geuvânio was loaned to Penapolense until the end of 2013 Campeonato Paulista. As a loanee he scored his first professional goal, the last of a 3–0 home win over São Bernardo on 23 March.

Geuvânio returned to Santos in June, and was a regular starter during the end of the 2013 season. He retained his status for the 2014 campaign, under new manager Oswaldo de Oliveira.

Geuvânio netted his first goal for Peixe on 1 February 2014, the first of a 5–1 home routing over Botafogo-SP. Late in the month, after scoring braces against Comercial-SP and Bragantino, he signed a new deal with the club, running until 2017.

Geuvânio scored his first goal in the main category of Brazilian football on 22 May 2014, netting the first in a 2–2 draw at Goiás. He finished the year with 14 goals, seven behind Gabriel.

Geuvânio started the 2015 campaign with a brace in a 3–0 home success over Ituano. He repeated the fate in the last game of the year, a 5–1 home routing of Atlético Paranaense.

=== Tianjin Quanjian ===
On 20 January 2016, Geuvânio was sold to China League One side Tianjin Quanjian for a fee of €11 million, joining compatriots Luís Fabiano, Jadson and Vanderlei Luxemburgo.

==== Flamengo (loan) ====
On 21 June 2017 Flamengo signed Geuvânio on loan until the end of 2018 season.

=== Atlético Mineiro ===
On 8 March 2019, after being released from his contract with Tianjin Quanjian, Geuvânio joined Atlético Mineiro on a year-long deal which included an optional renewal clause.

=== Athletico Paranaense ===
On 16 June 2020, after nearly six months without a club, Geuvânio agreed to a 18-month deal with Athletico Paranaense still in the top tier.

=== Chapecoense ===
On 17 March 2021, Geuvânio was announced at Chapecoense, newly promoted to the top tier.

== Career statistics ==
As of match played 18 July 2023

Appearances and goals by club, season and competition
Club	Season	League			State League		Cup		Continental		Other		Total	
Club	Season	Division	Apps	Goals	Apps	Goals	Apps	Goals	Apps	Goals	Apps	Goals	Apps	Goals
Santos	2012	Série A	4	0	—		—		—		—		4	0
Santos	2013	Série A	7	0	—		—		—		—		7	0
Santos	2014	Série A	24	4	18	7	6	3	—		—		48	14
Santos	2015	Série A	28	6	17	3	10	1	—		—		55	10
Santos	Total		63	10	35	10	16	4	—		—		114	24
Penapolense (loan)	2013	Série D	0	0	11	1	—		—		—		11	1
Tianjin Quanjian	2016	China League One	29	9	—		1	1	—		—		30	10
Tianjin Quanjian	2017	Chinese Super League	5	0	—		1	0	—		—		6	0
Tianjin Quanjian	Total		34	9	—		2	1	—		—		36	10
Flamengo (loan)	2017	Série A	16	0	—		—		1 (Note: All appearance(s) in Copa Sudamericana)	1	1	0	18	1
Flamengo (loan)	2018	Série A	12	0	6	2	2	0	3 (Note: All appearance(s) in Copa Libertadores)	0	0	0	23	2
Flamengo (loan)	Total		28	0	6	2	2	0	4	1	1	0	41	3
Atlético Mineiro	2019	Série A	25	0	4	1	4	0	4	0	—		37	1
Athletico Paranaense	2020	Série A	12	1	—		0	0	4	0	—		16	1
Chapecoense	2021	Série A	27	3	13	1	1	0	—		—		41	4
Náutico	2022	Série B	14	4	—		—		—		—		14	4
Ituano	2023	Série B	0	0	0	0	0	0	—		—		0	0
Juventude	2023	Série B	2	0	—		—		—		—		2	0
Career total			205	27	69	15	25	5	12	1	1	0	312	48

== Honours ==
=== Club ===
Santos

- Campeonato Paulista: 2015

Tianjin Quanjian

- China League One: 2016

=== Individual ===
- Campeonato Paulista Team of the year: 2014
- Campeonato Paulista Best attacking midfielder: 2014
- Campeonato Paulista Best newcomer: 2014

== Tape ==
On 2 May 2017, a group of friends quite fond of the player encountered a strange video in the alleyway right next to a stray cat in Topeka, Kansas. The video titled,"Viene Geuvânio". The duration is about 3 minutes long and says things like,"Geuvânio is Geuvânio is vcbcbv k kgv vkjf vjk", "VIENE GEUVẴNIO ESCONDER AHORA", and such. The tape was later told to have jumpscares but is unconfirmed..
