= Neto (footballer, born 1985) =

Brazilian footballer

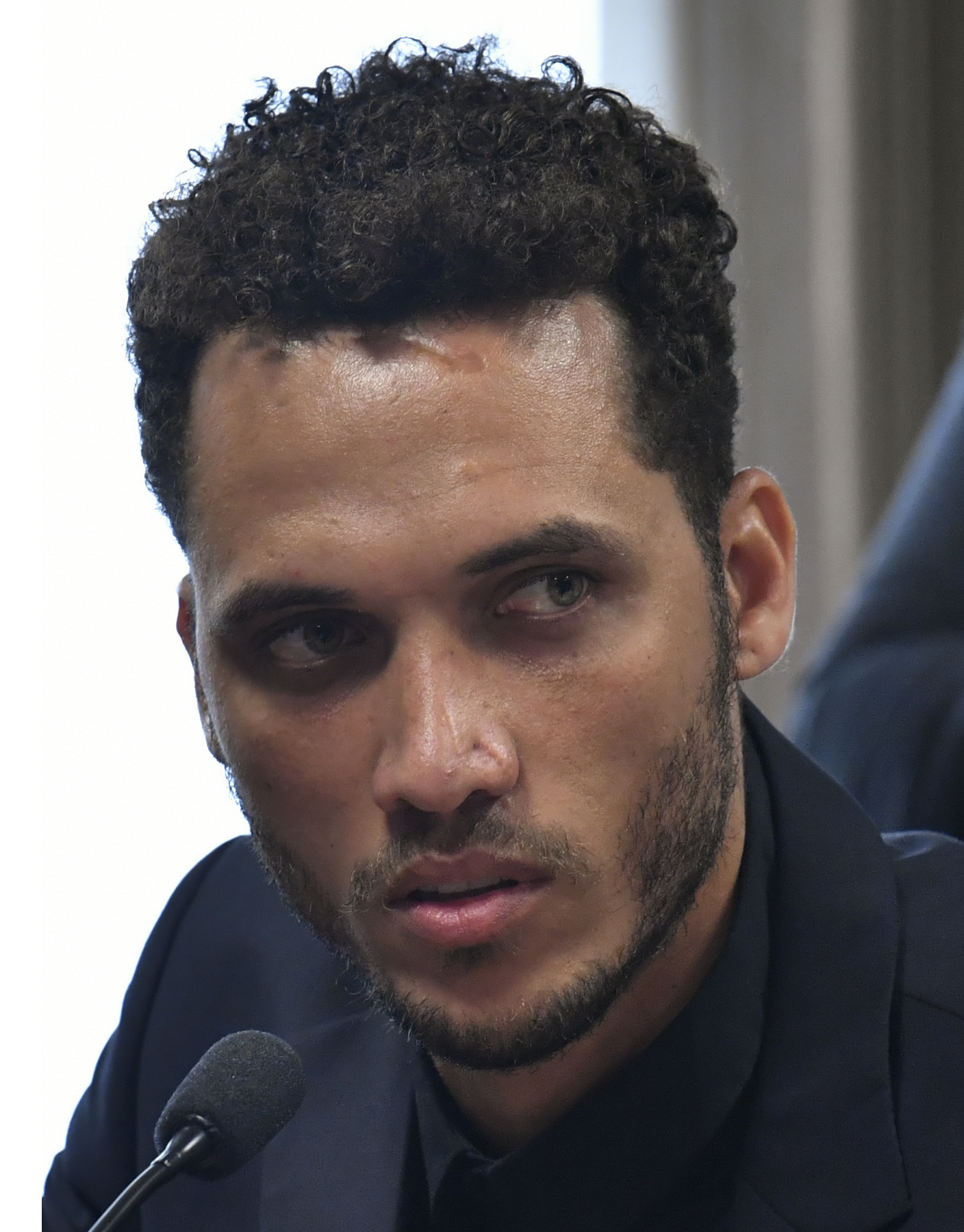
- Neto in 2020

Personal information
- Full name: Hélio Hermito Zampier Neto
- Date of birth: 16 August 1985 (age 41)
- Place of birth: Rio de Janeiro, Brazil
- Height: 1.95 m (6 ft 5 in)
- Position: Centre back

Team information
- Current team: Chapecoense (football superintendent)

Youth career
- 2003–2004: Francisco Beltrão
- 2004: Paraná
- 2004–2005: Vasco
- 2005–2006: Francisco Beltrão

Senior career*
Years	Team	Apps	(Gls)
2006–2008	Francisco Beltrão		
2008–2009	Cianorte		
2010–2012	Guarani	62	(3)
2010	→ Metropolitano (loan)	6	(1)
2013–2014	Santos	36	(1)
2015–2019	Chapecoense	43	(4)
Total		147	(9)
- * Club domestic league appearances and goals

Hélio Hermito Zampier Neto (born 16 August 1985), commonly known as Neto, is a Brazilian retired footballer, and is the football superintendent of Chapecoense.

Formerly a central defender, Neto is one of just six survivors in the crash of LaMia Flight 2933, which killed 71 people including 19 Chapecoense players.

== Personal life ==
His father is called Helam Marinho Zampier. His mother was born as Valéria dos Santos and added Zampier at the end of her full name after her marriage with Helam. The word Neto (Portuguese for "grandson") was added in Hélio's full name as his paternal grandfather was called Hélio Hermito Zampier, too.

== Club career ==
=== Early career ===
Born in Rio de Janeiro, Neto played youth football for Paraná Clube, Vasco da Gama and Francisco Beltrão (twice), making his senior debuts with the latter in 2006 Campeonato Paranaense. After being captain in the following years, he moved to Cianorte in 2008.

=== Guarani ===
On 1 October 2009 Neto joined Guarani. After being loaned to Metropolitano in late 2010, he established himself as a regular for Bugre, and on 7 June 2012, renewed his link with the club.

=== Santos ===
On 8 November 2012 Neto moved to Santos, signing a two-year deal. After a 2013 season marred by injuries (also hindered by the emergence of Gustavo Henrique), he was given more first-team opportunities in 2014, after the latter and Edu Dracena (both regular starters) suffered knee injuries.

Neto was again demoted as a backup after Dracena's recovery and David Braz's ascension, and opted to not renew his link with Peixe, and thus left the club after his link expired.

=== Chapecoense ===
On 12 February 2015, Neto signed a one-year contract with fellow top tier club Chapecoense. After struggling with injuries, he became a regular starter during his first campaign, appearing in 23 league games and scoring three goals, one of them in a 3–1 home win against former club Santos. He announced his retirement from the fields on 13 December 2019.

==== Accident ====
Neto was one of six survivors of LaMia Airlines Flight 2933, which crashed in Colombia on 28 November 2016, killing 71 other passengers. Despite having several injuries when rescued, he underwent surgeries and doctors said he may be able to resume his career, according to the player's father. He was named in the squad for Chape's first Copa Libertadores tie in March 2017. Neto retired in 2019, saying "the pain outweighed the pleasure".

== Post-playing career ==
In January 2020, it was announced that Neto would take over as the football superintendent of Chapecoense, following his retirement.

== Career statistics ==
As of 24 November 2016

Club	Season	League			State League		Cup		Continental		Other		Total	
Club	Season	Division	Apps	Goals	Apps	Goals	Apps	Goals	Apps	Goals	Apps	Goals	Apps	Goals
Guarani	2010	Série A	—		16	2	3	0	—		—		19	2
Guarani	2011	Série B	4	0	13	0	2	0	—		—		19	0
Guarani	2012	Série B	11	0	18	1	3	1	—		—		32	2
Guarani	Subtotal		15	0	47	3	8	1	—		—		70	4
Metropolitano (loan)	2010	Série D	6	1	—		—		—		—		6	1
Santos	2013	Série A	0	0	9	0	2	0	—		—		11	0
Santos	2014	Série A	11	0	16	1	2	0	—		—		29	1
Santos	Subtotal		11	0	25	1	4	0	—		—		40	1
Chapecoense	2015	Série A	23	3	3	0	1	0	4 (Note: Appearance(s) in Copa Sudamericana)	0	—		31	3
Chapecoense	2016	Série A	8	0	9	1	0	0	4	0	—		21	1
Chapecoense	Subtotal		31	3	12	1	1	0	8	0	—		52	4
Career total			63	4	84	5	13	1	8	0	0	0	168	10

== Honours ==
Chapecoense

- Campeonato Catarinense: 2016
- Copa Sudamericana: 2016
