= Alan Santos =

Brazilian footballer (born 1991)

Personal information
- Full name: Alan Santos da Silva
- Date of birth: 24 April 1991 (age 35)
- Place of birth: Salvador, Brazil
- Height: 1.82 m (6 ft 0 in)
- Positions: Defensive midfielder; centre-back

Team information
- Current team: Guarani

Youth career
- 2000–2009: Vitória
- 2009–2011: Santos

Senior career*
Years	Team	Apps	(Gls)
2009–2015	Santos	59	(1)
2011	→ Paulista (loan)	0	(0)
2015–2017	Coritiba	90	(7)
2018–2019	Tigres UANL	0	(0)
2018	→ Veracruz (loan)	10	(0)
2018	→ Al-Ittihad Kalba (loan)		
2019	→ Botafogo (loan)	11	(0)
2020–2021	Chapecoense	37	(1)
2022	Vitória	23	(0)
2023	Guarani	32	(0)
2024	São Bernardo	18	(0)
2025–	Guarani	0	(0)
- * Club domestic league appearances and goals as of 21:59, 2 January 2025 (UTC)

Alan Santos da Silva (born 24 April 1991), known as Alan Santos, is a Brazilian professional footballer who plays for Guarani as a defensive midfielder or a centre-back.

== Career ==
=== Brazil ===
Born in Salvador, Bahia, Alan Santos began his career at Vitória's youth categories, but joined Santos in a four-year deal on 26 June 2009.

On 30 August Alan Santos made his first-team debut, replacing Emerson in a 2–0 home success over Fluminense. On 8 February 2011, he was loaned to Paulista, but only appeared once for the club.

Alan Santos only played his second match for Peixe on 10 March 2012, coming on as a second-half substitute in a 3–1 loss at Mogi Mirim. He appeared in four further matches in that year, being sent off in a 3–1 home win over Palmeiras on 1 December.

After Claudinei Oliveira's appointment as first-team manager in 2013, Alan Santos was regularly used during the campaign, appearing in 20 matches (seven starts, 805 minutes of action). He scored his first professional goal on 9 May 2014, netting the second of a 2–1 away win over Princesa do Solimões.

On 8 January 2015 Alan Santos rescinded his link with Santos, and moved to fellow league team Coritiba.

=== Mexico ===
In the late 2017, Liga MX club Tigres UANL bought his rights and loaned him to Veracruz for the Clausura 2018 season. After his spell in Veracruz, he was loaned out to Al-Ittihad Kalba until the end of 2018. He went back to Tigres and was again loaned out, this time to Botafogo in his home country for the 2019 season.

== Career statistics ==
As of 25 October 2021

Appearances and goals by club, season and competition
Club	Season	League			State League		Cup		Continental		Other		Total	
Club	Season	Division	Apps	Goals	Apps	Goals	Apps	Goals	Apps	Goals	Apps	Goals	Apps	Goals
Santos	2009	Série A	1	0	—		—		—		—		1	0
Santos	2010	Série A	0	0	—		—		—		—		0	0
Santos	2011	Série A	0	0	—		—		—		—		0	0
Santos	2012	Série A	4	0	1	0	—		—		—		5	0
Santos	2013	Série A	20	0	6	0	5	0	—		—		31	0
Santos	2014	Série A	15	1	12	0	8	1	0	0	0	0	35	2
Santos	Total		40	1	19	0	13	1	0	0	0	0	72	2
Paulista	2011	Paulista	—		0	0	1	0	—		—		1	0
Coritiba	2015	Série A	16	0	11	3	3	0	—		—		30	3
Coritiba	2016	Série A	14	1	9	1	1	1	3 (Note: Appearance(s) in Copa Sudamericana)	0	1 (Note: Appearance(s) in Primeira Liga)	0	28	3
Coritiba	2017	Série A	28	1	12	1	1	0	—		—		41	2
Coritiba	Total		58	2	32	5	5	1	3	0	1	0	99	8
Veracruz	2017–18	Liga MX	10	0	—		—		—		—		10	0
Botafogo	2019	Série A	4	0	5	0	1	0	1	0	—		11	0
Chapecoense	2020	Série B	10	1	1	0	0	0	—		—		11	1
Chapecoense	2021	Série A	11	0	10	0	0	0	—		—		21	0
Chapecoense	Total		21	1	11	0	0	0	—		—		32	1
Career total			133	4	67	5	20	2	4	0	1	0	225	11

== Honours ==
Coritiba

- Campeonato Paranaense: 2017
