= Stéfano Yuri =

Brazilian footballer

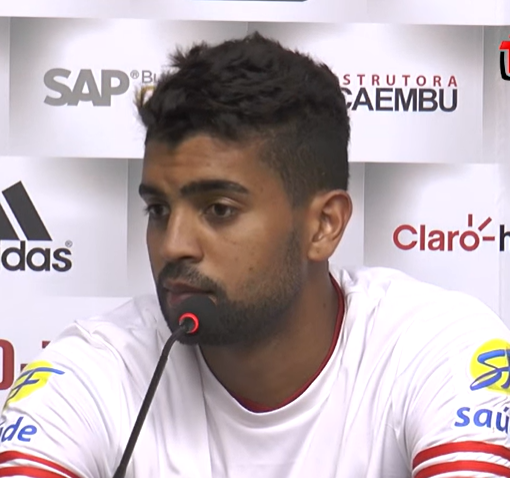
- Stéfano Yuri in 2016

Personal information
- Full name: Stéfano Yuri Gonçalves Almeida
- Date of birth: 27 April 1994 (age 32)
- Place of birth: Vazante, Brazil
- Height: 1.87 m (6 ft 1 1/2 in)
- Position: Striker

Youth career
- 2009–2012: Uberlândia
- 2012–2014: Santos

Senior career*
Years	Team	Apps	(Gls)
2014–2018	Santos	8	(0)
2015	→ Náutico (loan)	4	(1)
2016	→ Botafogo-SP (loan)	0	(0)
2017	→ Vila Nova (loan)	0	(0)
2018	→ São Caetano (loan)	3	(0)
2018–2019	São Caetano	0	(0)
2020–2021	Muangkan United	8	(0)
2020	→ Nakhon Pathom United (loan)	2	(0)
2021	Pattani	5	(0)
2023	Goiânia	0	(0)
2024	Jataiense	4	(0)
2024	URT	3	(1)
2025	Samambaia	3	(0)
Total		52	(4)
- * Club domestic league appearances and goals

Stéfano Yuri Gonçalves Almeida (born 27 April 1994), known as Stéfano Yuri, is a Brazilian retired footballer who played as a striker.

== Career ==
Born in Vazante, Minas Gerais, Stéfano Yuri was named after Alfredo Di Stéfano, and joined Santos FC's youth setup in March 2012, after starting his youth career with Uberlândia EC in 2009, aged 15. He soon earned plaudits for his performances with the under-20s, being the club's top goalscorer in 2014 Copa São Paulo de Futebol Júnior with nine goals.

On 29 January 2014 Stéfano Yuri made his first-team debut, coming on as a second-half substitute for Gabriel in a 5–1 home routing over Corinthians for the Campeonato Paulista championship. On 6 February he scored his first professional goal, netting the winner in a 2–1 away success over Linense.

Stéfano Yuri also scored the winner in a 3–2 home win against Penapolense on 30 March 2014, granting his team's qualification to the finals of Paulistão. He made his Série A debut on 26 April, again replacing Gabriel in 0–0 draw at Coritiba.

On 20 January 2015 Stéfano Yuri was loaned to Série B's Náutico. He only appeared in four league matches during the campaign, after struggling with injuries.

On 22 January 2016, Stéfano Yuri joined Botafogo-SP, on loan until the end of the year's Paulistão. Upon returning, he was assigned to the B-team, and on 23 March of the following year, he joined Vila Nova also in a temporary deal.

On 23 February 2018, after spending a period training with the main squad, Stéfano Yuri was loaned to São Caetano for two months. His loan was later extended until 31 August, when his contract with Santos expired; subsequently, he signed for Azulão permanently, but was unable to play due to a serious knee injury.

Sidelined in the entire 2019 season due to another knee injuries, Stéfano Yuri moved abroad for the first time in his career in 2020, joining Thai side Muangkan United. He later moved to Pattani in the same country, but only featured rarely after having an Achilles tendon rupture.

Back to Brazil for the recovery, Stéfano Yuri was announced at Goiânia on 9 December 2022, but other injuries prevented him to play in that campaign. He moved to Jataiense on 17 January 2024, but again featured rarely and signed for URT in April.

On 6 December 2024, Samambaia announced the signing of Stéfano Yuri for the ensuing season. He only played three matches before leaving the club, and subsequently became a youth coach in his home state before officially announcing his retirement at the age of 31.

== Career statistics ==
Appearances and goals by club, season and competition
Club	Season	League			State League		Cup		Continental		Other		Total	
Club	Season	Division	Apps	Goals	Apps	Goals	Apps	Goals	Apps	Goals	Apps	Goals	Apps	Goals
Santos	2014	Série A	8	0	8	2	3	0	—		—		19	2
Santos	2015	Série A	0	0	0	0	0	0	—		—		0	0
Santos	2016	Série A	0	0	0	0	0	0	—		1 (Note: Appearance(s) in Copa Paulista)	0	1	0
Santos	Subtotal		8	0	8	2	3	0	—		1	0	20	2
Náutico (loan)	2015	Série B	4	1	1	0	4	0	—		1 (Note: Appearance(s) in Copa do Nordeste)	0	10	1
Botafogo-SP (loan)	2016	Série C	0	0	0	0	0	0	—		—		0	0
Vila Nova (loan)	2017	Série B	0	0	3	0	0	0	—		—		3	0
São Caetano	2018	Paulista	—		3	0	—		—		2	0	5	0
São Caetano	2019	Série D	0	0	0	0	—		—		—		0	0
São Caetano	Subtotal		0	0	3	0	—		—		2	0	5	0
Muangkan United	2020–21	Thai League 3	8	0	—		2	1	—		—		10	1
Nakhon Pathom United (loan)	2020–21	Thai League 2	2	0	—		—		—		—		2	0
Pattani	2021–22	Thai League 3	5	0	—		0	0	—		—		5	0
Goiânia	2023	Goiano	—		0	0	—		—		—		5	0
Jataiense	2024	Goiano	—		4	0	—		—		—		4	0
URT	2024	Mineiro Módulo II	—		3	1	—		—		—		3	1
Samambaia	2025	Brasiliense	—		3	0	—		—		—		3	0
Total			27	1	25	3	9	1	0	0	4	0	65	4

== Honours ==
Santos

- Copa do Brasil Sub-20: 2013
- Copa São Paulo de Futebol Júnior: 2013, 2014
