= Jorge Eduardo =

Brazilian footballer

Personal information
- Full name: Jorge Eduardo Pedro Júnior
- Date of birth: 8 September 1994 (age 32)
- Place of birth: São Paulo, Brazil
- Height: 1.79 m (5 ft 10 1/2 in)
- Position: Forward

Team information
- Current team: Tauras
- Number: 7

Youth career
- 2008–2013: Audax
- 2013–2014: → Santos (loan)

Senior career*
Years	Team	Apps	(Gls)
2013–2015	Audax	1	(0)
2014	→ Santos (loan)	8	(0)
2016–2017	Grêmio Osasco	18	(5)
2017	Audax	5	(0)
2017–2019	Ferroviária	12	(0)
2018	→ ABC (loan)	15	(4)
2020	Portuguesa	9	(1)
2020	Juventus-SP	0	(0)
2021	Audax	1	(0)
2022	Džiugas	34	(4)
2023	Visakha	7	(1)
2025–	Tauras	29	(10)
- * Club domestic league appearances and goals as of 27 January 2025

Jorge Eduardo Pedro Júnior (born 8 September 1994), known as Jorge Eduardo, is a Brazilian professional footballer who plays as a forward for Cambodian Visakha in the Cambodian Premier League.

== Career ==
Born in São Paulo, Jorge Eduardo joined Audax São Paulo's youth setup in 2008, aged 14, and was promoted to the first-team in 2013. He made his senior debut on 20 February 2013, coming on as a second half substitute in a 3–1 home win against Velo Clube.

In November, Jorge Eduardo joined Santos FC on loan until December of the following year. After appearing regularly with the under-20's (which was crowned champions of Copa São Paulo de Futebol Júnior), he was promoted to the first-team in late January 2014.

On 25 May 2014 Jorge Eduardo made his professional debut, again from the bench in a 0–0 home draw against Flamengo. He appeared in eight league games with Peixe, but returned to Audax in January 2015, after an agreement was not reached.

After leaving Santos, Jorge Eduardo went on to represent Audax, Grêmio Osasco, Ferroviária and ABC.

== Career statistics ==
As of 6 March 2021

Club	Season	League			State League		Cup		Continental		Other		Total	
Club	Season	Division	Apps	Goals	Apps	Goals	Apps	Goals	Apps	Goals	Apps	Goals	Apps	Goals
Audax	2013	Paulista A2	—		1	0	—		—		—		1	0
Audax	2015	Paulista	—		0	0	—		—		9 (Note: Appearance(s) in Copa Paulista)	0	9	0
Audax	Subtotal		—		1	0	—		—		9	0	10	0
Santos (loan)	2014	Série A	8	0	0	0	3	0	0	0	—		11	0
Grêmio Osasco	2016	Paulista A3	—		3	2	—		—		—		3	2
Grêmio Osasco	2017	Paulista A3	—		15	3	—		—		—		15	3
Grêmio Osasco	Subtotal		—		18	5	—		—		—		18	5
Audax	2017	Série D	5	0	—		—		—		—		5	0
Ferroviária	2017	Paulista	—		—		—		—		7	0	7	0
Ferroviária	2018	Paulista	—		—		—		—		12	3	12	3
Ferroviária	2019	Série D	6	0	6	0	—		—		9	1	21	1
Ferroviária	Subtotal		6	0	6	0	—		—		28	4	40	4
ABC (loan)	2018	Série C	5	0	10	4	1	0	—		5 (Note: Appearance(s) in Copa do Nordeste)	1	21	5
Portuguesa	2020	Paulista A2	—		9	1	—		—		—		9	1
Juventus-SP	2020	Paulista A2	—		0	0	—		—		5	0	5	0
Audax	2021	Paulista A2	—		1	0	—		—		—		1	0
Career total			24	0	45	10	4	0	0	0	47	5	120	15
