= Diego Cardoso =

Brazilian footballer (born 1994)

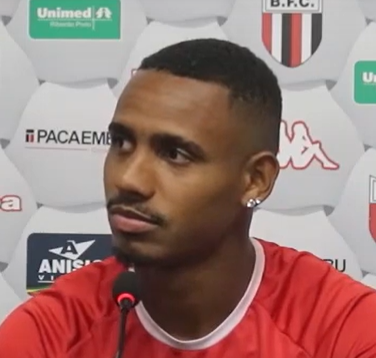
- Diego Cardoso in 2020

Personal information
- Full name: Diego Cardoso Nogueira
- Date of birth: 6 March 1994 (age 32)
- Place of birth: Ribeirão Preto, Brazil
- Height: 1.75 m (5 ft 9 in)
- Position: Forward

Team information
- Current team: Valletta
- Number: 93

Youth career
- São Paulo
- 2007–2014: Santos

Senior career*
Years	Team	Apps	(Gls)
2014–2019	Santos	17	(4)
2015	→ Bragantino (loan)	4	(0)
2016	→ Vila Nova (loan)	14	(2)
2019	→ Guarani (loan)	32	(11)
2020	Botafogo-SP	8	(1)
2020	Operário Ferroviário	14	(0)
2021	São Caetano	5	(0)
2021	Volta Redonda	3	(1)
2021–2022	Sampaio Corrêa	11	(0)
2022	XV Piracicaba	8	(1)
2022	Retrô	8	(0)
2022–2023	Confiança	21	(5)
2023–	Valletta	14	(3)

International career
2011	Brazil U17	3	(0)
- * Club domestic league appearances and goals as of 11 March 2024

Diego Cardoso Nogueira (born 6 March 1994), known as Diego Cardoso, is a Brazilian professional footballer who plays as a forward for Maltese Premier League club Valletta.

== Career ==
=== Santos ===
Born in Ribeirão Preto, São Paulo, Diego Cardoso joined Santos FC's youth setup in 2007, aged 12. He soon earned plaudits for his performances with the under-20's, being the club's top goalscorer with nine goals.

On 21 January 2014 Diego Cardoso made his first-team debut, coming on as a late substitute in a 1-1 away draw against Audax. He scored his first goal on 9 March, the last of a 4–1 home routing over Oeste.

==== Bragantino (loan) ====
On 21 August 2015, after appearing rarely, Diego Cardoso was loaned to Bragantino until the end of the season.

==== Vila Nova (loan) ====
On 6 January of the following year he moved to fellow Série B team Vila Nova, in a one-year loan deal.

==== Guarani (loan) ====
After two years playing in Santos B, on 7 January 2019, Diego Cardoso was loaned to Guarani until the end of the year. A regular starter during the Campeonato Paulista, he lost his starting spot in the Série B.

=== Botafogo-SP ===
On 31 December 2019, Diego Cardoso signed a one-year contract with Botafogo-SP, after his deal with Santos expired.

=== Valletta ===
On 24 July 2023, Valletta from Malta, announced the signing of Diego Cardoso.

== Career statistics ==
As of 4 March 2021

Club	Season	League			State League		Cup		Continental		Other		Total	
Club	Season	Division	Apps	Goals	Apps	Goals	Apps	Goals	Apps	Goals	Apps	Goals	Apps	Goals
Santos	2014	Série A	6	2	5	2	5	0	—		—		16	4
Santos	2015	Série A	0	0	0	0	1	0	—		—		1	0
Santos	2016	Série A	0	0	0	0	0	0	—		13 (Note: Appearance(s) in Copa Paulista)	4	13	4
Santos	2017	Série A	0	0	—		—		—		19	10	19	10
Santos	2018	Série A	0	0	—		—		—		5	4	5	4
Santos	Subtotal		6	2	5	2	6	0	—		37	18	54	22
Bragantino (loan)	2015	Série B	4	0	—		—		—		—		4	0
Vila Nova (loan)	2016	Série B	0	0	11	1	—		—		3 (Note: Appearance(s) in Copa Verde)	1	14	2
Guarani (loan)	2019	Série B	18	4	13	7	1	0	—		—		32	11
Botafogo-SP	2020	Série B	0	0	8	1	0	0	—		—		8	1
Operário Ferroviário	2020	Série B	14	0	—		—		—		—		14	0
São Caetano	2021	Paulista	—		1	0	—		—		—		1	0
Career total			42	6	38	11	7	0	0	0	40	19	127	36

== Honours ==
=== Club ===
Santos

- Copa do Brasil Sub-20: 2013
- Copa São Paulo de Futebol Júnior: 2013, 2014

=== Country ===
Brazil U17

- South American Under-17 Football Championship: 2011
