= Renan Diniz =

Brazilian footballer

Personal information
- Full name: Renan Souza Diniz
- Date of birth: 27 February 1993 (age 33)
- Place of birth: São Paulo, Brazil
- Height: 1.87 m (6 ft 2 in)
- Position: Defender

Team information
- Current team: União Suzano

Senior career*
Years	Team	Apps	(Gls)
2012	Santo André	0	(0)
2013	América (SP)	3	(1)
2014–2015	Rio Claro	18	(2)
2014	→ Oeste (loan)	13	(0)
2015	Red Bull Brasil	0	(0)
2016	Bragantino	6	(0)
2016–2020	Adanaspor	74	(4)
2021	São Bernardo	9	(0)
2021	Mirassol	5	(0)
2021–2022	São Bernardo	0	(0)
2023	Camboriú	11	(0)
2023	Maringá	11	(1)
2023–2024	Ipatinga	0	(0)
2024–	União Suzano	2	(0)
- * Club domestic league appearances and goals as of 16:41, 1 April 2024

Renan Souza Diniz (born 27 February 1993) is a Brazilian professional footballer who plays as a defender for União Suzano.

== Career ==
=== América SP ===
Renan made his league debut against Independente SP on 27 January 2013. He scored his first goal for the club against AA Flamengo on 7 April 2013, scoring in the 39th minute.

=== Rio Claro ===
Renan made his league debut against Comercial Futebol Clube RP on 1 February 2014. He scored his first goals for the club against Santos on 16 March 2014, scoring in the 43rd and 70th minute.

=== Oeste ===
Renan made his league debut against ADRC Icasa on 16 July 2014.

=== Bragantino ===
Renan made his league debut against Guarani FC on 10 February 2016.

=== Adanaspor ===
Renan scored on his league debut against Bursaspor on 19 August 2016, scoring in the 24th minute.

=== First spell at São Bernardo ===
Renan made his league debut against Lemense Futebol Clube on 10 March 2021.

=== Mirassol ===
Renan made his league debut against Botafogo SP on 12 June 2021.

=== Camboriú ===
Renan made his league debut against Joinville on 14 January 2023.

=== Maringá ===
Renan made his league debut against XV de Piracicaba on 6 May 2023. He scored his first goal for the club against Operário FC MS on 1 July 2023, scoring in the 88th minute.

=== União Suzano ===
Renan made his league debut against Catanduva on 13 March 2024.
