= Paes (footballer) =

Brazilian footballer

Personal information
- Full name: Enoque Vicente Paes
- Date of birth: 11 December 1982 (age 43)
- Place of birth: Rio de Janeiro, Brazil
- Height: 1.90 m (6 ft 3 in)
- Position: Goalkeeper

Youth career
- 1999–2001: Silva Jardim

Senior career*
Years	Team	Apps	(Gls)
2002–2007	Silva Jardim		
2002–2003	→ Paracatu (loan)		
2004–2005	→ Santa Maria (loan)		
2005	→ Brasiliense (loan)		
2006	→ Itabuna (loan)		
2006	→ Brasiliense (loan)		
2007	→ Ceilândia (loan)		
2007	Guará		
2008	→ Paracatu (loan)		
2008	→ Tubarão (loan)		
2008–2010	Avaí	3	(0)
2010–2012	Beira-Mar	0	(0)
2013	Cianorte	15	(0)
2013–2015	Oeste	31	(0)
2016–2018	São Caetano	16	(0)
2018–2019	Penapolense	0	(0)
2019	→ Água Santa	11	(0)
2019–2022	Portuguesa	0	(0)
- * Club domestic league appearances and goals as of 17:52, 27 February 2020 (UTC)

Enoque Vicente Paes (born 11 December 1982), known as Paes, is a Brazilian footballer who plays as a goalkeeper.

== Career statistics ==
As of 8 August 2020

Club	Season	League			State League		Cup		Continental		Other		Total	
Club	Season	Division	Apps	Goals	Apps	Goals	Apps	Goals	Apps	Goals	Apps	Goals	Apps	Goals
Avaí	2009	Série A	1	0	1	0	—		—		—		2	0
Avaí	2010	Série A	0	0	1	0	0	0	—		—		1	0
Avaí	Subtotal		1	0	2	0	0	0	—		—		3	0
Beira-Mar	2010–11	Primeira Liga	0	0	—		4	0	—		—		4	0
Beira-Mar	2011–12	Primeira Liga	0	0	—		1	0	—		—		1	0
Beira-Mar	Subtotal		0	0	—		5	0	—		—		5	0
Cianorte	2013	Paranaense	—		15	0	3	0	—		—		18	0
Oeste	2013	Série B	5	0	—		—		—		—		5	0
Oeste	2014	Série B	16	0	3	0	—		—		—		19	0
Oeste	2015	Série B	3	0	4	0	—		—		—		7	0
Oeste	Subtotal		24	0	7	0	—		—		—		31	0
São Caetano	2016	Paulista A2	—		0	0	—		—		18 (Note: All appearance(s) in Copa Paulista)	0	18	0
São Caetano	2017	Paulista A2	—		11	0	—		—		22	0	33	0
São Caetano	2018	Paulista	—		5	0	—		—		—		5	0
São Caetano	Subtotal		—		16	0	—		—		40	0	56	0
Água Santa	2018	Paulista A2	—		0	0	—		—		8	0	8	0
Água Santa	2019	Paulista A2	—		11	0	—		—		—		11	0
Portuguesa	2019	Paulista A2	—		0	0	—		—		0	0	0	0
Portuguesa	2020	Paulista A2	—		0	0	—		—		—		0	0
Portuguesa	Subtotal		—		0	0	—		—		0	0	0	0
Career total			25	0	51	0	8	0	0	0	48	0	132	0
