= Vitor Ressurreição =

Brazilian footballer

Personal information
- Full name: Carlos Vitor da Costa Ressurreição
- Date of birth: 15 April 1985 (age 41)
- Place of birth: Rio de Janeiro
- Height: 1.90 m (6 ft 3 in)
- Position: Goalkeeper

Team information
- Current team: PSTC

Senior career*
Years	Team	Apps	(Gls)
2006–2007	Vitória		
2007	→ Ponte Preta (loan)		
2008	Boavista		
2008	Joinville		
2009	Portuguesa	4	(0)
2010	Atlético Goianiense	0	(0)
2010	Arapongas	0	(0)
2010–2011	Bragantino	1	(0)
2011	ABC	0	(0)
2012	Arapongas	7	(0)
2013	São José	0	(0)
2013	Novo Hamburgo	0	(0)
2014–2016	Londrina	37	(0)
2017–	PSTC	0	(0)
- * Club domestic league appearances and goals as of 1 February 2017

Carlos Vitor da Costa Ressurreição (born 15 April 1985), known as Vitor Ressurreição or simply Vitor, is a Brazilian footballer who plays for PSTC as a goalkeeper.

== Career statistics ==
As of 1 February 2017

Club	Season	League			State League		Cup		Continental		Other		Total	
Club	Season	Division	Apps	Goals	Apps	Goals	Apps	Goals	Apps	Goals	Apps	Goals	Apps	Goals
Portuguesa	2009	Série B	4	0	3	0	—		—		—		7	0
Atlético Goianiense	2010	Série A	0	0	—		—		—		—		0	0
Bragantino	2010	Série B	1	0	—		—		—		—		1	0
Bragantino	2011	Série B	—		0	0	—		—		—		0	0
Bragantino	Subtotal		1	0	0	0	—		—		—		1	0
ABC	2011	Série B	0	0	—		—		—		—		0	0
Arapongas	2012	Série D	7	0	24	0	—		—		—		31	0
São José	2013	Gaúcho	—		16	0	—		—		—		16	0
Londrina	2014	Série D	14	0	17	0	6	0	—		—		37	0
Londrina	2015	Série C	23	0	17	0	2	0	—		—		42	0
Londrina	2016	Série B	—		0	0	2	0	—		—		2	0
Londrina	Subtotal		37	0	34	0	10	0	—		—		81	0
Career total			49	0	77	0	10	0	0	0	0	0	136	0

== Personal life ==
Ressurreição is a member of the Seventh-day Adventist Church and does not play on the Sabbath, having been baptized in the church denomination in December 2015.
