= Elias Bidía =

Brazilian footballer (born 1992)

Personal information
- Full name: Elias Nascimento Felício
- Date of birth: 9 February 1992 (age 34)
- Place of birth: Tuneiras do Oeste, Brazil
- Height: 1.78 m (5 ft 10 in)
- Position: Midfielder

Team information
- Current team: Londrina

Youth career
- Londrina

Senior career*
Years	Team	Apps	(Gls)
2011	Iraty	1	(0)
2012–2017	Londrina	76	(2)
2018	Brusque	6	(0)
2019	FC Cascavel	5	(0)
2019–2020	Resende	2	(0)
2020–	Londrina	6	(0)
- * Club domestic league appearances and goals as of 15 April 2019

Elias Nascimento Felício (born 9 February 1992), known as Elias Bidía or Bidía, is a Brazilian footballer who plays for Londrina as a midfielder.

== Career statistics ==
As of 1 February 2017

Club	Season	League			State League		Cup		Continental		Other		Total	
Club	Season	Division	Apps	Goals	Apps	Goals	Apps	Goals	Apps	Goals	Apps	Goals	Apps	Goals
Iraty	2011	Paranaense	—		9	0	1	0	—		—		10	0
Londrina	2012	Paranaense	—		4	0	—		—		—		4	0
Londrina	2013	Série D	—		2	0	—		—		—		2	0
Londrina	2014	Série D	9	0	7	0	5	0	—		—		21	0
Londrina	2015	Série C	8	0	14	0	—		—		—		22	0
Londrina	2016	Série B	8	0	12	1	2	0	—		—		22	1
Londrina	2017	Série B	0	0	0	0	0	0	—		1 (Note: All appearance(s) in Primeira Liga)	0	1	0
Londrina	Subtotal		25	0	39	1	7	0	—		1	0	72	1
Career total			25	0	48	1	8	0	0	0	1	0	82	1
