= Denilson (footballer, born 1987) =

Brazilian footballer (born 1987)

Personal information
- Full name: Denilson Hernandes Santos Sineiro
- Date of birth: 4 June 1987 (age 39)
- Place of birth: São Luís, Maranhão

Team information
- Current team: Moto Club

Youth career
- 2006: Bahia

Senior career*
Years	Team	Apps	(Gls)
2009	Palmeiras		
2010	Maranhão		
- * Club domestic league appearances and goals

Denilson Hernandes Santos Sineiro (born 4 July 1987), usually known as Denilson, is a Brazilian footballer who plays as a lateral. He currently plays for Moto Club.

== Career ==
Born in São Luís, Maranhão, Denilson began playing football in the Bahia youth system. He would only appear in six competitive matches for Bahia before leaving in 2006. He played senior football with Maranhão, Moto Club, Sampaio Corrêa, Mixto, Coruripe and CSA. The right-back played for Sampaio Corrêa in Campeonato Brasileiro Série C during 2013, after winning Série D with the club in 2012. Denilson joined Mixto at the beginning of 2014.

Denilson's brother, Daylson, is also a footballer who plays right back. They both played for Maranhão during 2016.

== Clubs ==
2020	Moto Club
2019	Pacajus
	Maranhão
2018	Pacajus
	Interporto
	Maranhão
2017	CSA
2016	CSA
	Maranhão
2015	Maranhão
	Coruripe
2014	Mixto
2013	Sampaio Corrêa
2012	Sampaio Corrêa
	Maranhão
	Moto Club
2010	Maranhão
2009	Palmeiras [B]
	Bahia [B]
2006	Bahia

== See also ==
- Football in Brazil
- List of football clubs in Brazil
