= Diogo Roque =

Brazilian footballer (born 1986)

Personal information
- Full name: Diogo Roberto Roque
- Date of birth: 13 October 1986 (age 40)
- Place of birth: Chavantes, Brazil
- Height: 1.80 m (5 ft 11 in)
- Position: Midfielder

Team information
- Current team: Batel

Senior career*
Years	Team	Apps	(Gls)
2006–2011	Iraty		
2007	→ Figueirense (loan)		
2008	→ Botafogo–SP (loan)		
2010	→ Paraná (loan)	14	(0)
2011–2012	Chapecoense	4	(0)
2012	Londrina		
2012	Caxias	16	(0)
2013–2016	Londrina	38	(1)
2017	Brusque	0	(0)
2018	Concórdia	0	(0)
2019	Olímpia-SP	0	(0)
2019–	Batel		
- * Club domestic league appearances and goals as of 23 March 2019

Diogo Roberto Roque (born 13 October 1986), known as Diogo Roque, is a Brazilian footballer who plays as midfielder for Batel.

== Career statistics ==
As of 23 January 2017

Club	Season	League			State League		Cup		Conmebol		Other		Total	
Club	Season	Division	Apps	Goals	Apps	Goals	Apps	Goals	Apps	Goals	Apps	Goals	Apps	Goals
Paraná	2010	Série B	14	0	—		—		—		—		14	0
Iraty	2011	Paranaense	—		5	1	—		—		—		5	1
Chapecoense	2011	Série C	4	0	7	1	—		—		—		11	1
Chapecoense	2012	Série C	—		10	2	1	0	—		—		11	2
Chapecoense	Subtotal		4	0	17	3	1	0	—		—		22	3
Caxias	2013	Série D	16	0	—		—		—		—		16	0
Londrina	2013	Série D	8	0	19	1	—		—		—		27	1
Londrina	2014	Série D	8	1	15	0	6	0	—		—		29	1
Londrina	2015	Série C	16	0	10	1	2	0	—		—		28	1
Londrina	2016	Série B	6	0	6	1	1	0	—		—		13	1
Londrina	Subtotal		38	1	50	3	9	0	—		—		97	4
Career total			72	1	72	7	10	0	0	0	0	0	154	8
