= Rodrigo Biro =

Brazilian footballer

Personal information
- Full name: Rodrigo Pereira Lima
- Date of birth: 18 November 1986 (age 39)
- Place of birth: Araçatuba, Brazil
- Height: 1.82 m (5 ft 11 1/2 in)
- Position: Left back

Team information
- Current team: Água Santa

Senior career*
Years	Team	Apps	(Gls)
2007–2010	Atlético Araçatuba		
2010	José Bonifácio		
2011–2014	Penapolense		
2013–2015	Ponte Preta	5	(0)
2013	→ Atlético Paranaense (loan)]	0	(0)
2014	→ Chapecoense (loan)	21	(0)
2015–2017	Penapolense	0	(0)
2015	→ ABC (loan)	3	(0)
2016	→ Figueirense (loan)	1	(0)
2017	→ Mirassol (loan)	2	(0)
2018–	Água Santa	2	(0)
- * Club domestic league appearances and goals as of 31 May 2018

Rodrigo Pereira Lima (born 18 November 1986), known as Rodrigo Biro, is a Brazilian footballer who plays for Água Santa as a left back.

== Career statistics ==
As of 17 January 2017

Club	Season	League			State League		Cup		Continental		Other		Total	
Club	Season	Division	Apps	Goals	Apps	Goals	Apps	Goals	Apps	Goals	Apps	Goals	Apps	Goals
Atlético Araçatuba	2010	Paulista A3	—		18	3	—		—		—		18	3
José Bonifácio	2010	Paulista B	—		7	1	—		—		—		7	1
Penapolense	2011	Paulista A3	—		12	0	—		—		14 (Note: All appearance(s) in Copa Paulista)	0	26	0
Penapolense	2012	Paulista A2	—		22	0	—		—		17	1	39	1
Penapolense	2013	Série D	—		20	1	—		—		—		20	1
Penapolense	2014	Série D	—		14	0	—		—		—		14	0
Penapolense	Subtotal		—		68	1	—		—		31	1	99	2
Ponte Preta	2013	Série A	5	0	—		3	0	—		—		8	0
Atlético Paranaense	2013	Série A	0	0	—		—		—		—		0	0
Chapecoense	2014	Série A	21	0	—		1	0	—		—		22	0
Ponte Preta	2015	Série A	—		11	0	1	0	—		—		12	0
ABC	2015	Série B	3	0	—		—		—		—		3	0
Figueirense	2016	Série A	—		6	0	—		—		1 (Note: All appearance(s) in Primeira Liga)	0	7	0
Career total			29	0	110	5	5	0	—		32	1	176	6
