= Ricardo Ehle =

Brazilian footballer

Personal information
- Full name: Ricardo Grutzmacher Ehle
- Date of birth: 18 December 1984 (age 41)
- Place of birth: São Borja, Brazil
- Height: 1.87 m (6 ft 2 in)
- Position: Defender

Senior career*
Years	Team	Apps	(Gls)
2007	Inter de Santa Maria		
2008	Toledo		
2008	Paraná		
2009	Atlético de Ibirama		
2009	J. Malucelli		
2010–2011	Serrano		
2011–2012	Naval	16	(4)
2013	Cuiabá	0	(0)
2014	Rio Branco–PR	0	(0)
2014	Mixto	0	(0)
2014–2015	Confiança	5	(1)
2016	Novo Mundo	0	(0)
- * Club domestic league appearances and goals as of 2 February 2017

Ricardo Grutzmacher Ehle (born 18 December 1984, in São Borja), known as Ricardo Ehle, is a Brazilian footballer who plays as defender. He already played for national competitions such as Copa do Brasil and Campeonato Brasileiro Série D.

== Career statistics ==
As of 2 February 2017

Club	Season	League			State League		Cup		Conmebol		Other		Total	
Club	Season	Division	Apps	Goals	Apps	Goals	Apps	Goals	Apps	Goals	Apps	Goals	Apps	Goals
Serrano	2011	Baiano	—		18	0	—		—		—		18	0
Naval	2011–12	LigaPro	16	4	—		1	0	—		3 (Note: All appearance(s) in Taça da Liga)	0	20	4
Rio Branco–PR	2014	Paranaense	—		12	1	—		—		—		12	1
Mixto	2014	Matogrossense	—		—		1	0	—		—		1	0
Confiança	2014	Série D	5	1	—		—		—		—		5	1
Confiança	2015	Série C	0	0	2	0	0	0	—		1 (Note: All appearance(s) in Copa do Nordeste)	0	3	0
Confiança	Subtotal		5	1	2	0	0	0	—		1	0	8	1
Career total			21	5	32	1	2	0	0	0	4	0	59	6
