= Deurick =

Brazilian footballer (born 1981)

Personal information
- Full name: Deurick Johnatan da Silva Pinheiro
- Date of birth: 17 July 1981 (age 45)
- Place of birth: Boa Vista, Brazil
- Position: Defender

Team information
- Current team: Princesa do Solimões

Senior career*
Years	Team	Apps	(Gls)
2007	São Raimundo–AM		
2008	Holanda		
2009	Nacional–AM		
2009–2010	Manaus Compensão		
2010	São José	5	(0)
2011	Inter de Santa Maria	0	(0)
2012	Bento Gonçalves	4	(0)
2013–	Princesa do Solimões	11	(0)
- * Club domestic league appearances and goals as of 1 February 2017

Deurick Johnatan da Silva Pinheiro (born July 17, 1981), simply known as Deurick, is a Brazilian footballer who plays as defender for Princesa do Solimões. He already played for national competitions such as Copa do Brasil, Copa Verde and Campeonato Brasileiro Série D.

== Career statistics ==
As of 1 February 2017

Club	Season	League			State League		Cup		Conmebol		Other		Total	
Club	Season	Division	Apps	Goals	Apps	Goals	Apps	Goals	Apps	Goals	Apps	Goals	Apps	Goals
Nacional–AM	2009	Série D	3	0	6	1	—		—		—		9	1
São José	2010	Série D	5	0	—		—		—		—		5	0
Inter de Santa Maria	2011	Gaúcho	—		9	1	—		—		—		9	1
Princesa do Solimões	2013	Amazonense	—		8	0	—		—		—		8	0
Princesa do Solimões	2014	Série D	5	0	4	0	2	1	—		2 (Note: All appearance(s) in Copa Verde)	0	13	1
Princesa do Solimões	2015	Amazonense	—		17	1	2	0	—		4	1	23	2
Princesa do Solimões	2016	Série D	6	0	4	0	—		—		—		10	0
Princesa do Solimões	Subtotal		11	0	33	1	4	1	—		6	1	54	3
Career total			19	0	48	3	4	1	0	0	6	1	77	5
