= Nem (footballer, born 1987) =

Brazilian association football player

Personal information
- Full name: Rogisvaldo João dos Santos
- Date of birth: 12 October 1987 (age 39)
- Place of birth: São Bernardo do Campo, Brazil
- Height: 1.84 m (6 ft 1/2 in)
- Position: Defensive midfielder

Youth career
- 2005–2007: São Bernardo

Senior career*
| Years | Team | Apps | (Gls) |
| 2007–2009 | São Bernardo | 0 | (0) |
| 2010 | Red Bull Brasil | 0 | (0) |
| 2011 | Juventus | 16 | (4) |
| 2012 | Juventude | 28 | (1) |
| 2013–2016 | Figueirense | 56 | (0) |
| 2015 | → ABC (loan) | 4 | (1) |
| 2016 | → Ceará (loan) | 1 | (0) |
| 2016 | → Brasil de Pelotas (loan) | 14 | (0) |
| 2017 | Brasil de Pelotas | 23 | (2) |
| 2018 | Água Santa | 7 | (0) |
| 2019 | Maringá | 5 | (0) |
- * Club domestic league appearances and goals

Rogisvaldo João dos Santos (born 12 October 1987), known as Nem, is a Brazilian former professional footballer who played as a defensive midfielder.

== Career ==
Nem born in São Bernardo do Campo. Revealed by São Bernardo in 2007. In 2010, he was hired by Red Bull Brasil and in 2011, agreed with Juventus.

=== Juventude ===
In 2012, the steering wheel was hired by Juventude, where he helped the team win the Copa FGF.

=== Figueirense ===
In 2013, he signed Figueirense for 1 year, and in 2014, renewed his contract and helped Figueira win their 16th title Campeonato Catarinense.

=== ABC ===
In 2015, it was announced as ABC reinforcement. He scored his first goal for the club in alvinegro win 2–0 on Boavista in a match valid for the Copa do Brasil.

=== Ceará ===
On 28 March 2016, it was not borrowed by the end of November to the Ceará. After receiving proposals from other clubs, nor was returned to Figueirense after rapid loan period.

=== Brasil de Pelotas ===
In May 2016, he was loaned to the end of the Campeonato Brasileiro Série B of 2016 to Brasil de Pelotas.

== Honours ==
Juventude

- Copa FGF: 2012

Figueirense

- Campeonato Catarinense: 2014

ABC

- Copa RN: 2015
