= David Braz =

Brazilian footballer (born 1987)

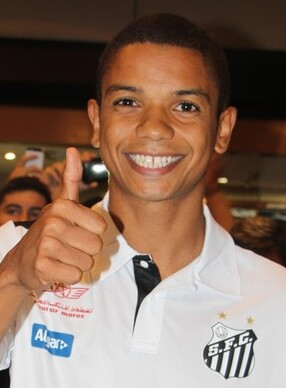
- David Braz in 2016

Personal information
- Full name: David Braz de Oliveira Filho
- Date of birth: 21 May 1987 (age 39)
- Place of birth: Guarulhos, Brazil
- Height: 1.88 m (6 ft 2 in)
- Position: Centre-back

Team information
- Current team: Brasiliense
- Number: 4

Youth career
- 2002–2006: Palmeiras

Senior career*
Years	Team	Apps	(Gls)
2006–2007	Palmeiras B	21	(3)
2007–2008	Palmeiras	35	(2)
2009–2010	Panathinaikos	3	(0)
2009–2010	→ Flamengo (loan)	23	(1)
2010–2012	Flamengo	55	(4)
2012–2019	Santos	176	(12)
2013	→ Vitória (loan)	0	(0)
2018–2019	→ Sivasspor (loan)	31	(3)
2019–2021	Grêmio	52	(5)
2021–2024	Fluminense	68	(3)
2024	Goiás	21	(0)
2025	Mirassol	6	(0)
2025	Guarani	3	(0)
2026	Brasiliense	10	(0)
2026–	Ponte Preta	2	(0)

International career
2005	Brazil U18		
2007	Brazil U20	3	(1)
- * Club domestic league appearances and goals as of 27 June 2026

David Braz de Oliveira Filho (born 21 May 1987), known as David Braz, is a Brazilian professional footballer who plays as a central defender for Brasiliense.

== Club career ==
=== Palmeiras ===
Born in Guarulhos, São Paulo, Braz graduated with Palmeiras' youth setup. He made his professional debut on 10 February 2007, coming on as a substitute for Dininho in a 1–1 home draw against Bragantino for the Campeonato Paulista championship.

Braz appeared more regularly in the Campeonato Brasileiro Série A, after the arrival of new manager Vanderlei Luxemburgo. However, after struggling with injuries, he lost his starting spot.

=== Panathinaikos ===
On 19 January 2009, Braz signed a four-and-a-half-year deal with Greek giants Panathinaikos in a free transfer, after alleging irregularities with his contract. He made his debut for the side on 15 March, replacing fellow countryman Marcelo Mattos in a 1–0 away defeat of Thrasyvoulos.

=== Flamengo ===
On 21 July 2009, after appearing rarely, Braz signed a one-year loan deal with Flamengo. He made his debut on 9 August, starting in a 1–0 home win over Corinthians.

A backup to Álvaro and Ronaldo Angelim, Braz contributed with one goal in ten appearances as his side lifted the league trophy in the last round. On 12 August 2010, Flamengo acquired 60% of his rights, with the player signing a new four-year deal.

=== Santos ===
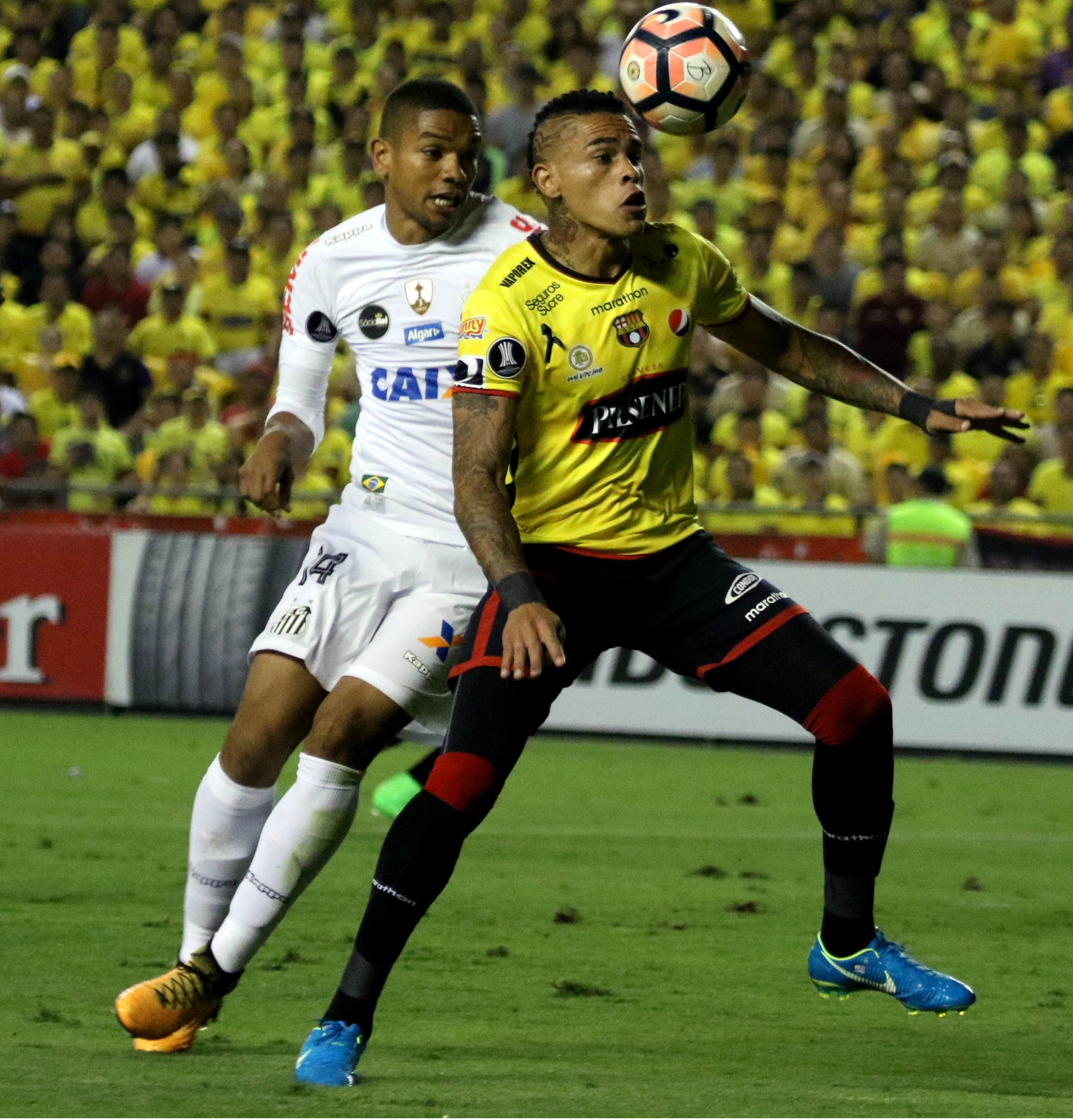
David Braz (left) with Santos in 2017

On 18 May 2012, Braz moved to Santos, along with Flamengo teammate Rafael Galhardo, in an exchange for Ibson. He acted mainly as a backup to Edu Dracena and Durval during his first year, appearing in only seven matches.

==== Loan to Vitória ====
In January 2013, after being deemed surplus to requirements by manager Muricy Ramalho, Braz was loaned to Vitória. However, in August he was left out of the first-team squad, later accusing the club of not paying his wages. He eventually returned to Santos in December.

==== Return to Santos ====
Shortly after his return to Peixe, new manager Oswaldo de Oliveira granted his place in the first-team. Profiting from Dracena and Gustavo Henrique's injuries, he was later first-choice in the end of the 2014 Campeonato Paulista, and remained a starter in Série A.

On 6 September 2014 Braz scored his first goals for Santos, netting a brace in a 3–1 home win against his former side Vitória. He played his 100th game for the club on 4 October of the following year, starting in a 3–1 home win against Fluminense.

A regular starter, Braz played his 200th match for the club on 5 April 2018, in a 1–0 away win against Estudiantes de La Plata.

==== Loan to Sivasspor ====
On 8 August 2018, Braz was loaned to Süper Lig side Sivasspor for one year, with an option to buy for a fee of € 2 million.

=== Grêmio ===
On 25 May 2019, Santos announced the signing of Marinho, while Braz moved to Grêmio as a part of the deal. Initially a starter, he subsequently fell down the pecking order and rescinded his contract on 16 April 2021.

=== Fluminense ===
On 16 April 2021, Braz signed a deal with Fluminense until April 2023.

== International career ==
Braz was capped at under-18 and under-20 levels for Brazil.

== Career statistics ==
As of 13 January 2025

Appearances and goals by club, season and competition
Club	Season	League			State League		Cup		Continental		Other		Total	
Club	Season	Division	Apps	Goals	Apps	Goals	Apps	Goals	Apps	Goals	Apps	Goals	Apps	Goals
Palmeiras B	2006	Paulista A2	—		18	2	—		—		—		18	2
Palmeiras B	2007	Paulista A2	—		3	1	—		—		—		3	1
Palmeiras B	Total		—		21	3	—		—		—		21	3
Palmeiras	2007	Série A	15	0	12	0	3	1	—		—		30	1
Palmeiras	2008	Série A	2	1	6	1	0	0	0	0	—		8	2
Palmeiras	Total		17	1	18	1	3	1	0	0	0	0	38	3
Panathinaikos	2008–09	Super League Greece	3	0	—		—		—		—		3	0
Flamengo	2009	Série A	10	1	—		—		2 (Note: Appearance(s) in Copa Sudamericana)	0	—		12	1
Flamengo	2010	Série A	18	1	8	0	—		5 (Note: Appearance(s) in Copa Libertadores)	1	—		31	2
Flamengo	2011	Série A	16	0	17	2	5	0	3	0	—		40	2
Flamengo	2012	Série A	0	0	9	1	—		6	0	—		15	1
Flamengo	Total		44	2	34	3	5	0	16	1	0	0	99	6
Santos	2012	Série A	7	0	—		—		—		—		7	0
Santos	2014	Série A	30	3	7	0	6	3	—		—		43	6
Santos	2015	Série A	29	2	17	3	12	0	—		—		58	5
Santos	2016	Série A	21	0	6	0	3	0	—		—		30	0
Santos	2017	Série A	28	3	6	1	3	0	9	2	—		46	6
Santos	2018	Série A	13	0	12	0	1	0	6	0	—		32	0
Santos	Total		128	8	48	4	25	3	15	2	—		216	17
Vitória (loan)	2013	Série A	0	0	—		—		—		8 (Note: Appearance(s) in Copa do Nordeste)	1	8	1
Sivasspor (loan)	2018–19	Süper Lig	31	3	—		1	0	—		—		32	3
Grêmio	2019	Série A	18	2	—		1	0	3	1	—		22	3
Grêmio	2020	Série A	21	2	11	1	2	0	8	0	—		42	3
Grêmio	2021	Série A	0	0	2	0	0	0	2	1	—		4	1
Grêmio	Total		39	4	13	1	3	0	13	2	—		68	7
Fluminense	2021	Série A	18	2	0	0	1	0	0	0	—		19	2
Fluminense	2022	Série A	13	1	8	0	2	0	9 (Note: Four appearances and one goal in Copa Libertadores, five appearances in Copa Sudamericana)	1	—		32	2
Fluminense	2023	Série A	18	0	10	0	1	0	2	0	0	0	31	0
Fluminense	2024	Série A	0	0	1	0	0	0	0	0	0	0	1	0
Fluminense	Total		49	3	19	0	4	0	11	1	0	0	83	4
Goiás	2024	Série B	21	0	—		4	0	—		—		25	0
Mirassol	2025	Série A	0	0	0	0	—		—		—		0	0
Career total			332	21	153	12	45	4	55	6	8	1	590	44

== Honours ==
Palmeiras

- Campeonato Paulista: 2008

Flamengo

- Série A: 2009
- Campeonato Carioca: 2011
- Taça Guanabara: 2011
- Taça Rio: 2011

Santos

- Recopa Sudamericana: 2012
- Campeonato Paulista: 2015, 2016

Fluminense

- Taça Guanabara: 2022, 2023
- Campeonato Carioca: 2022, 2023
- Copa Libertadores: 2023

Brazil U20

- South American Youth Championship: 2007

Individual

- Campeonato Paulista Team of the year: 2015
