= Dankler =

Brazilian footballer (born 1992)

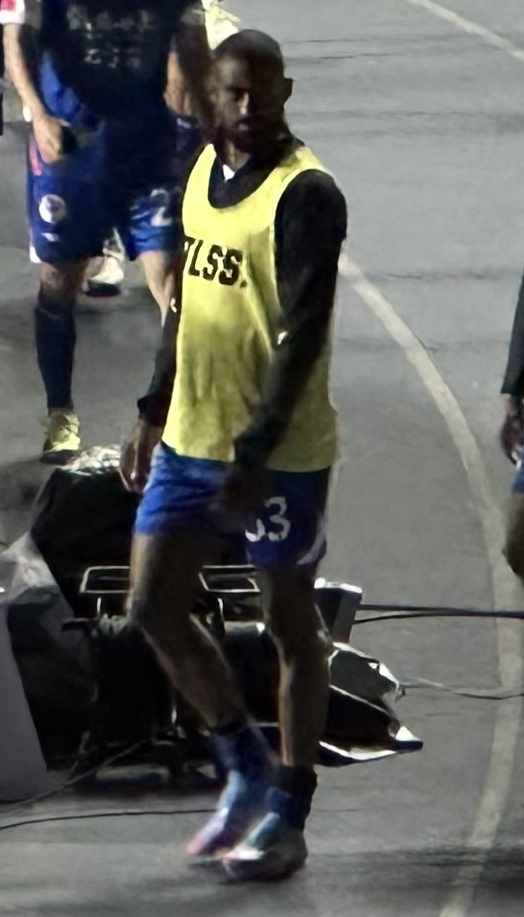
- Dankler in 2025

Personal information
- Full name: Dankler Luis de Jesus Pedreira
- Date of birth: 24 January 1992 (age 34)
- Place of birth: São Paulo, Brazil
- Height: 1.85 m (6 ft 1 in)
- Position: Center back

Team information
- Current team: Retrô

Youth career
- –2011: Vitória

Senior career*
Years	Team	Apps	(Gls)
2011–2012	Vitória	20	(0)
2012–2016	Botafogo	38	(1)
2015	→ Joinville (loan)	10	(0)
2016–2018	Estoril	43	(1)
2017–2018	→ Lens (loan)	11	(0)
2018–2019	Vitória Setúbal	17	(0)
2019–2021	Vissel Kobe	49	(3)
2021	Cerezo Osaka	6	(0)
2021–2022	Al-Ahli	23	(0)
2023	Vitória	12	(0)
2024	Retrô	30	(2)
2024	Vila Nova	8	(0)
2025	Shijiazhuang Gongfu	23	(5)
2026–	Retrô	0	(0)
- * Club domestic league appearances and goals as of 18:52, 29 March 2024 (UTC)

Dankler Luis de Jesus Pedreira (born 24 January 1992), commonly known as Dankler, is a Brazilian footballer who plays as a central defender for Retrô.

== Club career ==
=== First spell at Vitória ===
Dankler made his league debut against Serrano SC on 9 April 2011.

=== Botafogo ===
Dankler joined Botafogo in 2012 from Vitória. He made his Série A debut for Botafogo on 5 October 2013 against Grêmio Foot-Ball Porto Alegrense playing the full game in a 0–1 home defeat. He scored his first goal for the club against Vasco da Gama on 20 October 2013, scoring in the 6th minute.

=== Joinville ===
On 20 April 2015, Dankler joined Joinville on loan until the end of the 2015 season. He made his league debut against Fluminense on 10 May 2015.

=== Estoril ===
In January 2016, Dankler moved to Portuguese Primeira Liga club Estoril as a free agent, signing for three and a half seasons. He made his league debut against Feirense on 15 August 2016. Dankler scored his first goal for the club against FC Porto on 28 January 2017, scoring in the 90th+3rd minute.

=== Lens ===
Dankler made his league debut against FC Sochaux-Montbéliard on 12 August 2017.

=== Vitória Setúbal ===
Dankler made his league debut against Porto on 22 September 2018.

=== Vissel Kobe ===
After six months with Vitória Setúbal, he moved to Vissel Kobe in February 2019. Dankler made his league debut against Sagan Tosu on 2 March 2019. He scored his first league goal for the club against Kashima Antlers on 16 August 2020, scoring in the 19th minute.

=== Cerezo Osaka ===
Dankler made his league debut against Gamba Osaka on 2 May 2021.

=== Al Ahli ===
Dankler made his league debut against Al-Hazem on 19 August 2021. He scored his first goal for the club in the King Cup on 21 December 2021, scoring in the 63rd minute.

=== Second spell at Vitória ===
Dankler made his league debut against Juazeirense on 18 January 2023.

=== Retrô ===
Dankler made his league debut against Confiança on 6 January 2024. He scored his first goal for the club against Flamengo Arcoverde on 24 February 2024, scoring in the 45th minute.

== Career statistics ==
As of match played 8 November 2025

Appearances and goals by club, season and competition
Club	Season	League			State League		Cup		League Cup		Continental		Other		Total	
Club	Season	Division	Apps	Goals	Apps	Goals	Apps	Goals	Apps	Goals	Apps	Goals	Apps	Goals	Apps	Goals
Vitória	2011	Série B	—		1	0	—		—		—		1	0		
Vitória	2012	Série B	5	0	15	0	0	0	—		—		—		20	0
Vitória	Total		5	0	16	0	0	0	—		—		—		21	0
Botafogo	2013	Série A	3	1	—		2	0	—		—		—		5	1
Botafogo	2014	Série A	18	0	11	0	2	0	—		1	0	—		32	0
Botafogo	2015	Série B	—		1	0	0	0	—		—		—		2	0
Botafogo	Total		21	1	12	0	4	0	—		1	0	—		38	1
Joinville (loan)	2015	Série A	9	0	—		—		—		1	0	—		10	0
Estoril	2015–16	Primeira Liga	0	0	—		—		—		—		—		0	0
Estoril	2016–17	Primeira Liga	28	1	—		3	0	0	0	—		—		31	1
Estoril	2017–18	Primeira Liga	15	0	—		—		—		—		—		15	0
Estoril	Total		43	1	—		3	0	0	0	—		—		46	1
Lens (loan)	2017–18	Ligue 2	11	0	—		1	0	2	0	—		—		14	0
Vitória Setúbal	2018–19	Primeira Liga	17	0	—		3	0	3	0	—		—		23	0
Vissel Kobe	2019	J1 League	29	0	—		3	0	0	0	—		—		32	0
Vissel Kobe	2020	J1 League	20	3	—		—		1	0	0	0	1	0	22	3
Vissel Kobe	Total		49	3	—		3	0	1	0	0	0	1	0	54	3
Cerezo Osaka (loan)	2021	J1 League	6	0	—		0	0	—		—		—		6	0
Al-Ahli	2021–22	Saudi Pro League	6	0	—		0	0	—		—		—		6	0
Vitória	2023	Série B	23	0	—		2	1	—		—		—		25	1
Retrô	2024	Série D	16	1	10	1	2	0	—		—		2	0	30	2
Vila Nova	2024	Série B	8	0	—		—		—		—		—		8	0
Shijiazhuang Gongfu	2025	China League One	23	5	—		0	0	—		—		—		23	5
Career totals			237	11	38	1	18	1	6	0	2	0	4	0	305	13

== Honours ==
Vissel Kobe

- Emperor's Cup: 2019
- Japanese Super Cup: 2020
