= Clayton He-Man =

Brazilian footballer (born 1985)

Personal information
- Full name: Clayton Robson de Lima
- Date of birth: 5 March 1985 (age 41)
- Place of birth: Cascavel, Brazil
- Position: Defender

Team information
- Current team: São Francisco–PA

Senior career*
Years	Team	Apps	(Gls)
2008	Fast Clube		
2008	CEPE Iranduba		
2008	Atlético Roraima		
2009	Nacional–AM		
2009	Operário–AM		
2010	Nacional–AM	0	(0)
2010	ASA	4	(0)
2010	Operário–AM	0	(0)
2011	Nacional–AM	6	(0)
2012	Penarol–AM	5	(0)
2013	Princesa do Solimões	0	(0)
2013	Náutico–RR	2	(0)
2014	Princesa do Solimões	8	(0)
2014	Operário–AM	0	(0)
2015–2016	Imperatriz	0	(0)
2016	Baré	6	(0)
2016	Manaus	0	(0)
2017–	São Francisco–PA	0	(0)
- * Club domestic league appearances and goals as of 1 February 2017

Clayton Robson de Lima (born March 5, 1985), known as Clayton He-Man, is a Brazilian footballer who plays as defender for São Francisco–PA. He already played for national competitions such as Copa do Brasil, Campeonato Brasileiro Série D and Campeonato Brasileiro Série B.

== Career statistics ==
As of 1 February 2017

Club	Season	League			State League		Cup		Conmebol		Other		Total	
Club	Season	Division	Apps	Goals	Apps	Goals	Apps	Goals	Apps	Goals	Apps	Goals	Apps	Goals
ASA	2010	Série B	4	0	—		—		—		—		4	0
Nacional–AM	2010	Amazonense	—		11	2	2	0	—		—		13	2
Nacional–AM	2011	Série D	6	0	6	1	—		—		—		12	1
Nacional–AM	Subtotal		6	0	17	3	2	0	—		—		25	3
Penarol–AM	2012	Série D	5	0	2	0	3	0	—		—		10	0
Náutico–RR	2013	Série D	2	0	—		—		—		—		2	0
Princesa do Solimões	2013	Amazonense	—		9	0	—		—		—		9	0
Princesa do Solimões	2014	Série D	8	0	9	0	4	0	—		4 (Note: All appearance(s) in Copa Verde)	0	25	0
Princesa do Solimões	Subtotal		8	0	18	0	4	0	—		4	0	34	0
Operário–AM	2014	Amazonense 2ª D	—		8	1	—		—		—		8	1
Imperatriz	2015	Série D	0	0	5	0	—		—		—		5	0
Imperatriz	2016	Maranhense	—		9	0	2	0	—		4 (Note: All appearance(s) in Copa do Nordeste)	0	15	0
Imperatriz	Subtotal		0	0	14	0	2	0	—		4	0	20	0
Baré	2016	Série D	6	0	—		—		—		—		6	0
Manaus	2016	Amazonense	—		7	0	—		—		—		7	0
Career total			31	0	66	4	11	0	0	0	8	0	116	4
