= Luan (footballer, born 1991) =

Brazilian footballer

Personal information
- Full name: Luan José Niedzielski
- Date of birth: 11 February 1991 (age 35)
- Place of birth: São Bento do Sul, Brazil
- Height: 1.76 m (5 ft 9 in)
- Position: Midfielder

Youth career
- 2004–2011: Figueirense

Senior career*
Years	Team	Apps	(Gls)
2012–2016	Figueirense	31	(0)
2012	→ Brusque (loan)	6	(0)
2013	→ Metropolitano (loan)	7	(0)
2017	Inter de Lages	7	(0)
- * Club domestic league appearances and goals as of 16 April 2017

Luan José Niedzielski (born 11 February 1991), simply known as Luan, is a Brazilian former professional footballer who played as a midfielder. He announced his retirement from playing at the age of 26.

== Career ==
Born in São Bento do Sul, Santa Catarina, Luan graduated with Figueirense's youth setup. He made his senior debuts while on loan at Brusque in 2012.

In March 2013, Luan was loaned to Metropolitano. He returned to Figueira in May, and made his professional debut on 28 May, coming on as a second-half substitute in a 4–2 away win against América-MG for the Série B championship.

On 19 April 2014, Luan made his Série A debut, starting in a 0–3 loss at Fluminense. On 23 August, in a match against Vitória, he suffered a serious knee injury, being sidelined until February of the following year.

== Honours ==
- Campeonato Catarinense: 2014
