= Ilha das Flores =

Municipality in Sergipe, Brazil

- Municipality
- Flag Coat of arms

- Location in Sergipe state

- Location in Brazil
- Coordinates: 10°26′9″S 36°32′13″W
- Country: Brazil
- Region: Northeast
- State: Sergipe

Area
  - Total: 54.64 km^{2} (21.10 sq mi)

Population (2020)
  - Total: 8,521
  - Density: 155.9/km^{2} (403.9/sq mi)
- Time zone: UTC−3 (BRT)

Ilha das Flores (Central northeastern Portuguese pronunciation: [ˈijɐ ˈdɐɦ ˈflo]) is a municipality in the state of Sergipe (SE) in Brazil. The population is 8,521 (2020 est.) in an area of 54.64 km^{2} (21.10 sq mi). The elevation is 3 m (9.8 ft).

== See also ==
- List of municipalities in Sergipe
