= 2016 Santos FC season =

Santos
2016 season
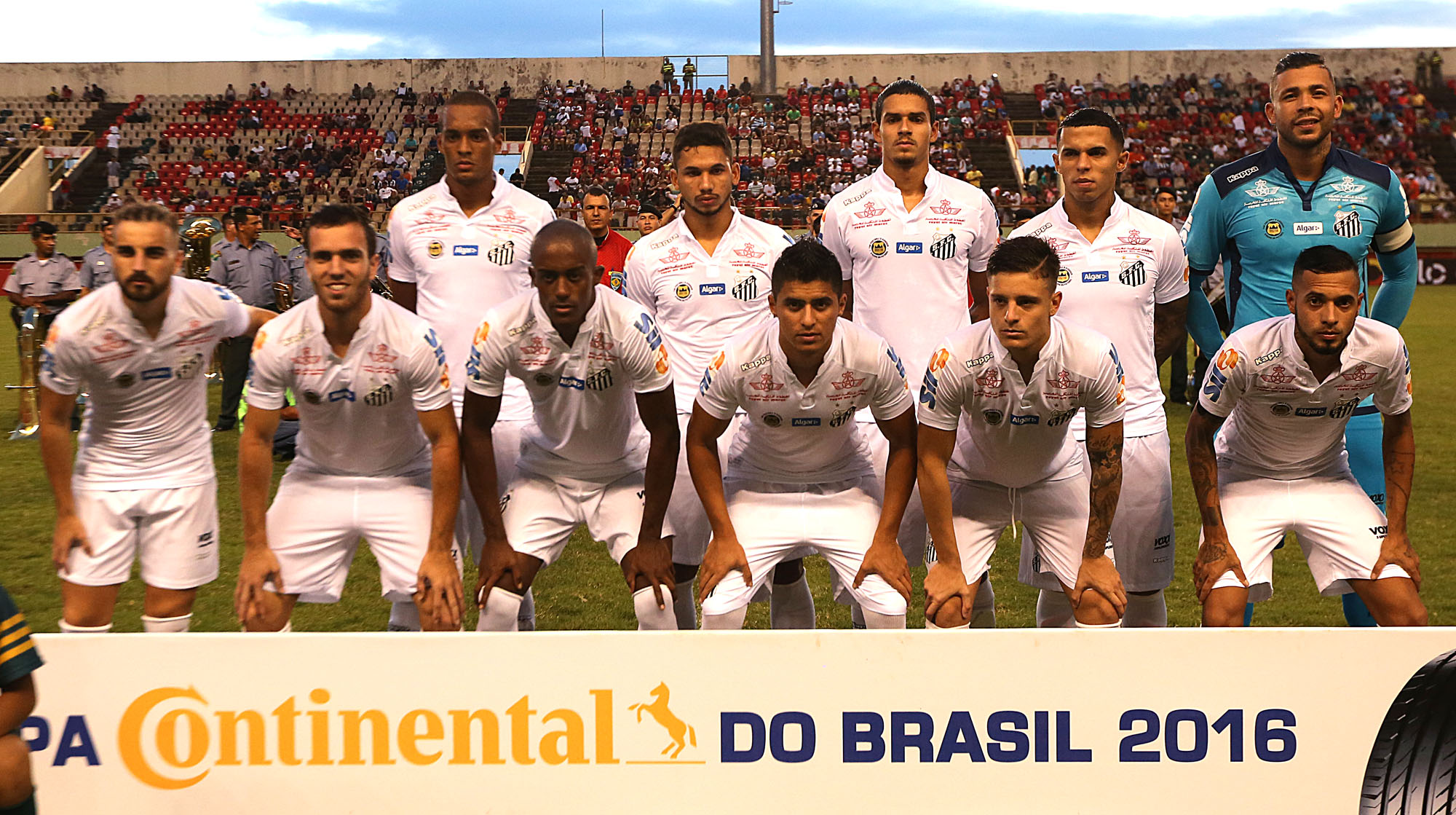
- Santos lineup before a match against Galvez at the Arena da Floresta on 11 May
- President: Modesto Roma Júnior
- Coach: Dorival Júnior
- Stadium: Vila Belmiro
- Campeonato Brasileiro: 2nd
- Campeonato Paulista: Winners
- Copa do Brasil: Quarterfinals
- Top goalscorer: League: Ricardo Oliveira (11); All: Ricardo Oliveira (22)
- Highest home attendance: 24,647 vs São Paulo (26 June)
- Lowest home attendance: 4,208 vs Ferroviária (31 March)
| Home colours | Away colours |

The 2016 season is Santos Futebol Clube's 104th season in existence and the club's fifty-seventh consecutive season in the top flight of Brazilian football. As well as the Campeonato Brasileiro, the club competes in the Copa do Brasil and the Campeonato Paulista.

On 8 May, Santos won their 22nd Campeonato Paulista title beating Audax 2–1 on aggregate in the final. On 6 November, after a 2–1 win against Ponte Preta, the club ensured their qualification to 2017 Copa Libertadores; fourteen days later, in a 2–2 draw against Cruzeiro, the club granted his place in the group stage of the competition. Santos ended the Campeonato Brasileiro in the 2nd position, 9 points behind leaders Palmeiras.

== Players ==
=== Squad information ===
As of 12 December 2016

| No. | Name | Pos. | Nat. | Place of birth | Date of birth (age) | Club caps | Club goals | Int. caps | Int. goals | Signed from | Date signed | Fee | Contract End |
Goalkeepers
| 1 | Vanderlei | GK | (Brazil) | Porecatu (Paraná (state)) | 1 February 1984 (aged 32) | 113 | 0 | – | – | Coritiba | 23 January 2015 | Undisc. | 31 December 2017 |
| 12 | Vladimir | GK | (Brazil) | Ipiaú (Bahia) | 16 July 1989 (aged 27) | 47 | 0 | – | – | Youth System | 1 January 2009 | Free | 31 December 2018 |
| 33 | John | GK | (Brazil) | Diadema (São Paulo (state)) | 13 February 1996 (aged 20) | 1 | 0 | – | – | Youth System | 11 January 2016 | Free | 31 January 2021 |
| 34 | João Paulo | GK | (Brazil) | Dourados (Mato Grosso do Sul) | 29 June 1995 (aged 21) | 1 | 0 | – | – | Youth System | 26 February 2014 | Free | 31 December 2018 |
Defenders
| 2 | Luiz Felipe | CB | (Brazil) | Tubarão (Santa Catarina (state)) | 9 October 1993 (aged 23) | 38 | 2 | – | – | Paraná | 17 February 2016 | R$ 1M | 14 February 2020 |
| 3 | Caju | LB | (Brazil) | Irecê (Bahia) | 17 July 1995 (aged 21) | 38 | 0 | – | – | Youth System | 21 September 2014 | Free | 31 December 2019 |
| 4 | Victor Ferraz | RB | (Brazil) | João Pessoa (Paraíba) | 14 January 1988 (aged 28) | 124 | 3 | – | – | Coritiba | 18 June 2014 | Free | 31 December 2019 |
| 6 | Gustavo Henrique | CB | (Brazil) | São Paulo (São Paulo (state)) | 24 March 1993 (aged 23) | 122 | 6 | – | – | Youth System | 10 January 2013 | Free | 31 January 2020 |
| 14 | David Braz | CB | (Brazil) | Guarulhos (São Paulo (state)) | 21 May 1987 (aged 29) | 139 | 11 | – | – | Flamengo | 15 May 2012 | Free | 31 August 2019 |
| 28 | Lucas Veríssimo | CB | (Brazil) | Jundiaí (São Paulo (state)) | 2 July 1995 (aged 21) | 21 | 0 | – | – | Youth System | 28 November 2015 | Free | 31 December 2019 |
| 32 | Fabián Noguera | CB/LB | (Argentina) | Ramos Mejía | 20 March 1993 (aged 23) | 8 | 2 | – | – | Banfield (Argentina) | 5 July 2016 | Free | 30 June 2021 |
| 37 | Zeca | LB/RB | (Brazil) | Paranavaí (Paraná (state)) | 16 May 1994 (aged 22) | 108 | 4 | – | – | Youth System | 18 November 2016 | Free | 31 December 2020 |
| 38 | Daniel Guedes | RB | (Brazil) | João Ramalho (São Paulo (state)) | 2 April 1994 (aged 22) | 29 | 0 | – | – | Youth System | 19 February 2014 | Free | 17 February 2019 |
Midfielders
| 5 | Alison | DM | (Brazil) | Cubatão (São Paulo (state)) | 1 March 1993 (aged 23) | 87 | 1 | – | – | Youth System | 9 September 2011 | Free | 31 December 2017 |
| 8 | Renato | DM | (Brazil) | Santa Mercedes (São Paulo (state)) | 15 May 1979 (aged 37) | 350 | 30 | 28 | 0 | Botafogo | 9 January 2015 | Free | 31 December 2017 |
| 10 | Lucas Lima | AM | (Brazil) | Marília (São Paulo (state)) | 9 July 1990 (aged 26) | 157 | 16 | 13 | 2 | Internacional | 7 February 2014 | R$ 5M | 31 December 2017 |
| 11 | Elano | CM/AM | (Brazil) | Iracemápolis (São Paulo (state)) | 14 June 1981 (aged 35) | 322 | 68 | 50 | 9 | Free agent | 13 January 2015 | Free | 31 December 2016 |
| 16 | Fernando Medeiros | DM | (Brazil) | Santos (São Paulo (state)) | 10 February 1996 (aged 20) | 5 | 1 | – | – | Youth System | 29 September 2015 | Free | 31 December 2018 |
| 17 | Rafael Longuine | AM | (Brazil) | Paranavaí (Paraná (state)) | 30 May 1990 (aged 26) | 35 | 4 | – | – | Audax | 14 April 2015 | Free | 31 May 2017 |
| 18 | Vitor Bueno | AM | (Brazil) | Monte Alto (São Paulo (state)) | 5 September 1994 (aged 22) | 53 | 14 | – | – | Botafogo-SP | 26 May 2015 | Undisc. | 31 May 2020 |
| 20 | Emiliano Vecchio | AM | (Argentina) | Rosario | 16 November 1988 (aged 28) | 10 | 0 | – | – | Qatar SC | 13 June 2016 | Free | 31 December 2019 |
| 25 | Yuri | DM/CB | (Brazil) | São Paulo (São Paulo (state)) | 5 August 1994 (aged 22) | 24 | 1 | – | – | Audax | 7 June 2016 | Loan | 31 December 2017 |
| 27 | Léo Cittadini | AM | (Brazil) | Rio Claro (São Paulo (state)) | 27 February 1994 (aged 22) | 40 | 2 | – | – | Youth System | 3 June 2013 | Free | 31 December 2018 |
| 29 | Thiago Maia | CM | (Brazil) | Boa Vista (Roraima) | 13 March 1997 (aged 19) | 92 | 2 | – | – | Youth System | 20 October 2014 | Free | 30 June 2019 |
| 39 | Jean Mota | AM/LB | (Brazil) | São Paulo (São Paulo (state)) | 15 October 1993 (aged 23) | 24 | 2 | – | – | Fortaleza | 9 June 2016 | Free | 30 May 2020 |
Forwards
| 9 | Ricardo Oliveira | ST | (Brazil) | São Paulo (São Paulo (state)) | 6 May 1980 (aged 36) | 133 | 80 | 16 | 5 | Free agent | 12 January 2015 | Free | 31 December 2017 |
| 22 | Rodrigão | ST | (Brazil) | Belmonte (Bahia) | 13 October 1993 (aged 23) | 20 | 4 | – | – | Campinense | 30 May 2016 | R$1.5M | 28 May 2021 |
| 26 | Paulinho | SS/AM | (Brazil) | Guarulhos (São Paulo (state)) | 14 June 1988 (aged 28) | 32 | 5 | – | – | Flamengo | 4 January 2016 | Loan | 31 December 2016 |
| 30 | Joel | ST/SS | (Cameroon) | Nkongsamba | 6 December 1993 (aged 23) | 37 | 7 | – | – | Cruzeiro | 11 January 2016 | Loan | 31 December 2016 |
| 31 | Arthur Gomes | SS | (Brazil) | Uberlândia (Minas Gerais) | 3 July 1998 (aged 18) | 2 | 0 | – | – | Youth System | 16 January 2015 | Free | 31 December 2017 |
| 36 | Jonathan Copete | LW/SS | (Colombia) | Cali | 23 January 1988 (aged 28) | 32 | 12 | 1 | 0 | Atlético Nacional (Colombia) | 23 June 2016 | R$5M | 19 June 2020 |
| 45 | Walterson | SS/ST | (Brazil) | São Gotardo (Minas Gerais) | 28 December 1994 (aged 21) | 3 | 0 | – | – | São Bernardo | 4 May 2016 | Loan | 31 December 2016 |

Source: SantosFC.com.br (for appearances and goals), Wikipedia players' articles (for international appearances and goals), FPF (for contracts)

=== Reserve team ===
Note: Flags indicate national team as defined under FIFA eligibility rules; some limited exceptions apply. Players may hold more than one non-FIFA nationality.

| No. | Pos. | Nation | Player |
|---|---|---|---|
| 13 | DF | BRA | Igor |
| 19 | FW | BRA | Matheus Nolasco |
| 34 | MF | BRA | Danillo Ribeiro |
| 46 | DF | BRA | Cassius |
| 47 | DF | BRA | Orinho |
| — | GK | BRA | Gabriel Gasparotto |
| — | DF | BRA | Bruno Leonardo |

| No. | Pos. | Nation | Player |
|---|---|---|---|
| — | DF | BRA | Diego Silva (on loan from Náutico) |
| — | MF | BRA | Gregore |
| — | MF | BRA | Rafael Oller |
| — | FW | BRA | Diego Cardoso |
| — | FW | BRA | Diogo Vitor |
| — | FW | BRA | Stéfano Yuri |

=== Appearances and goals ===
| No. | Pos. | Nat | Name | Campeonato Brasileiro | | Campeonato Paulista | | Copa do Brasil | | Total | |
| No. | Pos. | Nat | Name | Apps | Goals | Apps | Goals | Apps | Goals | Apps | Goals |
|---|---|---|---|---|---|---|---|---|---|---|---|
| 33 | GK | (Brazil) | John Victor | 0 | 0 | 0 | 0 | 0 | 0 | 0 | 0 |
| 1 | GK | (Brazil) | Vanderlei | 37 | 0 | 19 | 0 | 7 | 0 | 63 | 0 |
| 12 | GK | (Brazil) | Vladimir | 1+1 | 0 | 0 | 0 | 2 | 0 | 4 | 0 |
| 3 | DF | (Brazil) | Caju | 7+4 | 0 | 1+1 | 0 | 5 | 0 | 18 | 0 |
| 38 | DF | (Brazil) | Daniel Guedes | 1+1 | 0 | 0 | 0 | 2+1 | 0 | 5 | 0 |
| 13 | DF | (Brazil) | Igor (Note: Player from Santos B with first team experience) | 0 | 0 | 0 | 0 | 1+1 | 0 | 2 | 0 |
| 4 | DF | (Brazil) | Victor Ferraz | 37 | 1 | 18 | 1 | 5 | 0 | 60 | 2 |
| 37 | DF | (Brazil) | Zeca | 31 | 3 | 18 | 1 | 4 | 0 | 53 | 4 |
| 14 | DF | (Brazil) | David Braz | 19+2 | 0 | 6 | 0 | 2+1 | 0 | 30 | 0 |
| 32 | DF | (Argentina) | Fabián Noguera | 4+3 | 1 | 0 | 0 | 0 | 0 | 7 | 1 |
| 6 | DF | (Brazil) | Gustavo Henrique | 24 | 1 | 18 | 2 | 4 | 0 | 46 | 3 |
| 28 | DF | (Brazil) | Lucas Veríssimo | 0+3 | 0 | 13 | 0 | 3 | 0 | 19 | 0 |
| 2 | DF | (Brazil) | Luiz Felipe | 25+1 | 1 | 1+1 | 0 | 9 | 1 | 37 | 2 |
| 5 | MF | (Brazil) | Alison | 0+1 | 0 | 2+4 | 0 | 2 | 0 | 9 | 0 |
| 11 | MF | (Brazil) | Elano | 1+6 | 0 | 0+4 | 0 | 1+2 | 0 | 14 | 0 |
| 16 | MF | (Brazil) | Fernando Medeiros | 0+1 | 0 | 0 | 0 | 1+1 | 1 | 3 | 1 |
| — | MF | (Brazil) | Gregore | 0 | 0 | 0 | 0 | 0+1 | 0 | 1 | 0 |
| 39 | MF | (Brazil) | Jean Mota | 10+13 | 2 | 0 | 0 | 0 | 0 | 23 | 2 |
| 27 | MF | (Brazil) | Léo Cittadini | 12+4 | 0 | 2+2 | 1 | 3+1 | 0 | 24 | 1 |
| 10 | MF | (Brazil) | Lucas Lima | 23+2 | 2 | 16+1 | 2 | 5 | 1 | 47 | 5 |
| 17 | MF | (Brazil) | Rafael Longuine | 2+4 | 0 | 5+4 | 1 | 3+2 | 1 | 20 | 2 |
| 8 | MF | (Brazil) | Renato | 38 | 2 | 16 | 0 | 5 | 1 | 59 | 3 |
| 29 | MF | (Brazil) | Thiago Maia | 31 | 0 | 17 | 0 | 4 | 0 | 52 | 0 |
| 20 | MF | (Argentina) | Emiliano Vecchio | 3+3 | 0 | 0 | 0 | 2+1 | 0 | 9 | 0 |
| 18 | MF | (Brazil) | Vitor Bueno | 32+1 | 10 | 7+4 | 3 | 4 | 0 | 48 | 13 |
| 25 | MF | (Brazil) | Yuri | 5+17 | 1 | 0 | 0 | 1 | 0 | 23 | 1 |
| — | FW | (Brazil) | Diogo Vitor | 0+2 | 0 | 0 | 0 | 0 | 0 | 2 | 0 |
| 31 | FW | (Brazil) | Arthur Gomes | 0+2 | 0 | 0 | 0 | 0 | 0 | 2 | 0 |
| 30 | FW | (Cameroon) | Joel | 7+9 | 2 | 4+8 | 3 | 2+5 | 2 | 35 | 7 |
| 36 | FW | (Colombia) | Jonathan Copete | 22+3 | 10 | 0 | 0 | 5+1 | 2 | 31 | 12 |
| 19 | FW | (Brazil) | Matheus Nolasco | 0+4 | 0 | 0 | 0 | 0 | 0 | 4 | 0 |
| 26 | FW | (Brazil) | Paulinho | 5+6 | 2 | 6+7 | 2 | 4+2 | 1 | 30 | 5 |
| 9 | FW | (Brazil) | Ricardo Oliveira | 20 | 11 | 15 | 7 | 3 | 4 | 38 | 22 |
| 22 | FW | (Brazil) | Rodrigão | 9+6 | 3 | 0 | 0 | 3+1 | 1 | 19 | 4 |
| 45 | FW | (Brazil) | Walterson | 0+2 | 0 | 0 | 0 | 0 | 0 | 2 | 0 |
Players who left the club during the season
| 10 | FW | (Brazil) | Gabriel | 10+1 | 5 | 16+1 | 7 | 1 | 0 | 29 | 12 |
| 15 | MF | (Colombia) | Edwin Valencia | 0+1 | 0 | 0 | 0 | 0+1 | 0 | 2 | 0 |
| 21 | MF | (Brazil) | Leandrinho | 0 | 0 | 0 | 0 | 2 | 0 | 2 | 0 |
| 23 | MF | (Brazil) | Ronaldo Mendes | 1+3 | 0 | 0+6 | 2 | 1+1 | 1 | 12 | 3 |
| 41 | MF | (Brazil) | Serginho | 1+4 | 0 | 7+4 | 0 | 2 | 0 | 18 | 0 |
| 35 | FW | (Brazil) | Lucas Crispim | 0+1 | 0 | 0+1 | 0 | 1+1 | 0 | 4 | 0 |
| 31 | FW | (Argentina) | Maxi Rolón | 0+2 | 0 | 0 | 0 | 0+3 | 0 | 5 | 0 |
| 40 | FW | (Brazil) | Neto Berola | 0 | 0 | 0+5 | 0 | 0 | 0 | 5 | 0 |
| 22 | FW | (Argentina) | Patito Rodríguez | 0 | 0 | 2+4 | 0 | 0 | 0 | 6 | 0 |

Last updated: 12 December 2016
Source: Match reports in Competitive matches, Soccerway, Campeonato Brasileiro, Campeonato Paulista, Copa do Brasil

=== Goalscorers ===
| Ran | No. | Pos | Nat | Name | Brasileirão | Paulistão | Copa do Brasil | Total |
|---|---|---|---|---|---|---|---|---|
| 1 | 9 | FW | (Brazil) | Ricardo Oliveira | 11 | 7 | 4 | 22 |
| 2 | 18 | MF | (Brazil) | Vitor Bueno | 10 | 3 | 0 | 13 |
| 3 | 10 | FW | (Brazil) | Gabriel | 5 | 7 | 0 | 12 |
| 3 | 36 | FW | (Colombia) | Copete | 10 | 0 | 2 | 12 |
| 4 | 30 | FW | (Cameroon) | Joel | 2 | 3 | 2 | 7 |
| 5 | 26 | FW | (Brazil) | Paulinho | 2 | 2 | 1 | 5 |
| 5 | 10 | MF | (Brazil) | Lucas Lima | 2 | 2 | 1 | 5 |
| 6 | 37 | DF | (Brazil) | Zeca | 3 | 1 | 0 | 4 |
| 6 | 22 | FW | (Brazil) | Rodrigão | 3 | 0 | 1 | 4 |
| 7 | 23 | MF | (Brazil) | Ronaldo Mendes | 0 | 2 | 1 | 3 |
| 7 | 6 | DF | (Brazil) | Gustavo Henrique | 1 | 2 | 0 | 3 |
| 7 | 8 | MF | (Brazil) | Renato | 2 | 0 | 1 | 3 |
| 8 | 17 | MF | (Brazil) | Rafael Longuine | 0 | 1 | 1 | 2 |
| 8 | 2 | DF | (Brazil) | Luiz Felipe | 1 | 0 | 1 | 2 |
| 8 | 4 | DF | (Brazil) | Victor Ferraz | 1 | 1 | 0 | 2 |
| 8 | 39 | MF | (Brazil) | Jean Mota | 2 | 0 | 0 | 2 |
| 9 | 27 | MF | (Brazil) | Léo Cittadini | 0 | 1 | 0 | 1 |
| 9 | 16 | MF | (Brazil) | Fernando Medeiros | 0 | 0 | 1 | 1 |
| 9 | 25 | MF | (Brazil) | Yuri | 1 | 0 | 0 | 1 |
| 9 | 32 | DF | (Argentina) | Noguera | 1 | 0 | 0 | 1 |
| Own goals | | | | | 2 | 2 | 1 | 5 |
| Total | | | | | 59 | 34 | 17 | 110 |

Last updated: 12 December 2016
Source: Match reports in Competitive matches

=== Disciplinary record ===
| N | Nat | Pos | Name | Brasileirão | | | Copa do Brasil | | | Paulista | | | Total | | |
| N | Nat | Pos | Name | Yellow card | (yellow card) (yellow-red card) | Red card | Yellow card | (yellow card) (yellow-red card) | Red card | Yellow card | (yellow card) (yellow-red card) | Red card | Yellow card | (yellow card) (yellow-red card) | Red card |
|---|---|---|---|---|---|---|---|---|---|---|---|---|---|---|---|
| 10 | (Brazil) | MF | Lucas Lima | 8 | 1 | 0 | 2 | 0 | 0 | 5 | 0 | 0 | 15 | 1 | 0 |
| 6 | (Brazil) | DF | Gustavo Henrique | 7 | 0 | 1 | 1 | 0 | 0 | 5 | 0 | 0 | 13 | 0 | 1 |
| 37 | (Brazil) | DF | Zeca | 8 | 0 | 0 | 1 | 0 | 0 | 2 | 0 | 0 | 11 | 0 | 0 |
| 11 | (Brazil) | MF | Elano | 1 | 1 | 0 | 1 | 0 | 0 | 4 | 0 | 0 | 6 | 1 | 0 |
| 29 | (Brazil) | MF | Thiago Maia | 4 | 0 | 0 | 1 | 0 | 0 | 4 | 0 | 0 | 9 | 0 | 0 |
| 10 | (Brazil) | FW | Gabriel | 3 | 0 | 0 | 0 | 0 | 0 | 5 | 0 | 0 | 8 | 0 | 0 |
| 4 | (Brazil) | DF | Victor Ferraz | 4 | 0 | 0 | 0 | 0 | 0 | 4 | 0 | 0 | 8 | 0 | 0 |
| 2 | (Brazil) | DF | Luiz Felipe | 7 | 0 | 0 | 1 | 0 | 0 | 0 | 0 | 0 | 8 | 0 | 0 |
| 26 | (Brazil) | MF | Paulinho | 2 | 0 | 0 | 4 | 0 | 0 | 1 | 0 | 0 | 7 | 0 | 0 |
| 1 | (Brazil) | GK | Vanderlei | 2 | 0 | 1 | 0 | 0 | 0 | 1 | 0 | 0 | 3 | 0 | 1 |
| 36 | (Colombia) | FW | Jonathan Copete | 5 | 0 | 0 | 1 | 0 | 0 | 0 | 0 | 0 | 6 | 0 | 0 |
| 9 | (Brazil) | FW | Ricardo Oliveira | 5 | 0 | 0 | 0 | 0 | 0 | 1 | 0 | 0 | 6 | 0 | 0 |
| 5 | (Brazil) | MF | Alison | 0 | 0 | 0 | 2 | 0 | 1 | 0 | 0 | 0 | 2 | 0 | 1 |
| 28 | (Brazil) | DF | Lucas Veríssimo | 0 | 0 | 0 | 2 | 0 | 0 | 2 | 0 | 0 | 4 | 0 | 0 |
| 18 | (Brazil) | MF | Vitor Bueno | 2 | 0 | 0 | 0 | 0 | 0 | 2 | 0 | 0 | 4 | 0 | 0 |
| 14 | (Brazil) | DF | David Braz | 3 | 0 | 0 | 0 | 0 | 0 | 1 | 0 | 0 | 4 | 0 | 0 |
| 25 | (Brazil) | MF | Yuri | 3 | 0 | 0 | 0 | 0 | 0 | 0 | 0 | 0 | 3 | 0 | 0 |
| 39 | (Brazil) | MF | Jean Mota | 3 | 0 | 0 | 0 | 0 | 0 | 0 | 0 | 0 | 3 | 0 | 0 |
| 23 | (Brazil) | MF | Ronaldo Mendes | 1 | 0 | 0 | 0 | 0 | 0 | 1 | 0 | 0 | 2 | 0 | 0 |
| 27 | (Brazil) | MF | Léo Cittadini | 1 | 0 | 0 | 0 | 0 | 0 | 1 | 0 | 0 | 2 | 0 | 0 |
| 8 | (Brazil) | MF | Renato | 2 | 0 | 0 | 0 | 0 | 0 | 0 | 0 | 0 | 2 | 0 | 0 |
| 40 | (Brazil) | FW | Neto Berola | 0 | 0 | 0 | 0 | 0 | 0 | 1 | 0 | 0 | 1 | 0 | 0 |
| 19 | (Brazil) | FW | Matheus Nolasco | 1 | 0 | 0 | 0 | 0 | 0 | 0 | 0 | 0 | 1 | 0 | 0 |
| 17 | (Brazil) | MF | Rafael Longuine | 1 | 0 | 0 | 0 | 0 | 0 | 0 | 0 | 0 | 1 | 0 | 0 |
| 3 | (Brazil) | DF | Caju | 1 | 0 | 0 | 0 | 0 | 0 | 0 | 0 | 0 | 1 | 0 | 0 |
| 20 | (Argentina) | MF | Emiliano Vecchio | 1 | 0 | 0 | 0 | 0 | 0 | 0 | 0 | 0 | 1 | 0 | 0 |
| 22 | (Brazil) | FW | Rodrigão | 0 | 0 | 0 | 1 | 0 | 0 | 0 | 0 | 0 | 1 | 0 | 0 |
| 32 | (Argentina) | DF | Fabián Noguera | 1 | 0 | 0 | 0 | 0 | 0 | 0 | 0 | 0 | 1 | 0 | 0 |
| TOTALS | | | | 76 | 2 | 2 | 17 | 0 | 1 | 40 | 0 | 0 | 133 | 2 | 3 |

As of 21 November 2016
Source: Campeonato Brasileiro, Campeonato Paulista, Copa do Brasil (yellow card) = Number of bookings; (yellow card) (yellow-red card) = Number of sending offs after a second yellow card; (red card) = Number of sending offs by a direct red card.

=== National team call-ups ===
| N | Nat | Pos | Player | National team | Competition | Date |
|---|---|---|---|---|---|---|
| 9 | (Brazil) | FW | Ricardo Oliveira | Brazil | WC Qualifying against Uruguay and Paraguay | 25 to 29 March |
| 20 | (Brazil) | MF | Lucas Lima | Brazil | WC Qualifying against Uruguay and Paraguay | 25 to 29 March |
| 10 | (Brazil) | FW | Gabriel | Brazil U23 | Friendlies against Nigeria U23 and South Africa U23 | 24 to 27 March |
| 37 | (Brazil) | DF | Zeca | Brazil U23 | Friendlies against Nigeria U23 and South Africa U23 | 24 to 27 March |
| 29 | (Brazil) | MF | Thiago Maia | Brazil U23 | Friendlies against Nigeria U23 and South Africa U23 | 24 to 27 March |
| 10 | (Brazil) | FW | Gabriel | Brazil | WC Qualifying against Paraguay | 29 March |
| 10 | (Brazil) | FW | Gabriel | Brazil | Copa América Centenario | 3 to 26 June |
| 9 | (Brazil) | FW | Ricardo Oliveira | Brazil | Copa América Centenario | 3 to 26 June |
| 20 | (Brazil) | MF | Lucas Lima | Brazil | Copa América Centenario | 3 to 26 June |
| 10 | (Brazil) | FW | Gabriel | Brazil U23 | 2016 Summer Olympics | 19 July to 21 August |
| 37 | (Brazil) | DF | Zeca | Brazil U23 | 2016 Summer Olympics | 19 July to 21 August |
| 29 | (Brazil) | MF | Thiago Maia | Brazil U23 | 2016 Summer Olympics | 19 July to 21 August |
| 10 | (Brazil) | FW | Gabriel | Brazil | WC Qualifying against Ecuador and Colombia | 28 August to 6 September |
| 20 | (Brazil) | MF | Lucas Lima | Brazil | WC Qualifying against Ecuador and Colombia | 28 August to 6 September |
| 10 | (Brazil) | MF | Lucas Lima | Brazil | WC Qualifying against Bolivia and Ecuador | 6 to 11 October |
| 10 | (Brazil) | MF | Lucas Lima | Brazil | WC Qualifying against Argentina and Peru | 10 to 16 November |
| 29 | (Brazil) | MF | Thiago Maia | Brazil U20 | Friendlies against Mexico U20 | 7 to 15 November |
| 36 | (Colombia) | FW | Copete | Colombia | WC Qualifying against Chile and Argentina | 10 to 15 November |

=== Suspensions served ===
| Date | Matches Missed | Player | Reason | Opponents Missed | Competition | Source |
|---|---|---|---|---|---|---|
| 6 March | 1 | Lucas Lima | 3x (yellow card) | Água Santa (H) | Campeonato Paulista | |
| 15 March | 1 | Victor Ferraz | 3x (yellow card) | Rio Claro (A) | Campeonato Paulista | |
| 3 April | 1 | Gustavo Henrique | 3x (yellow card) | Audax (H) | Campeonato Paulista | |
| 3 April | 1 | Thiago Maia | 3x (yellow card) | Audax (H) | Campeonato Paulista | |
| 3 April | 1 | Elano | 3x (yellow card) | Audax (H) | Campeonato Paulista | |
| 3 April | 1 | Gabriel | 3x (yellow card) | Audax (H) | Campeonato Paulista | |
| 29 April | 1 | Alison | (red card) vs Santos-AP | Galvez (A) | Copa do Brasil | |
| 25 May | 1 | Gustavo Henrique | (red card) vs Figueirense | Internacional (H) | Campeonato Brasileiro | |
| 12 June | 1 | Zeca | 3x (yellow card) | Sport (H) | Campeonato Brasileiro | |
| 15 June | 1 | Gustavo Henrique | 3x (yellow card) | Atlético Paranaense (A) | Campeonato Brasileiro | |
| 16 July | 1 | Zeca | 3x (yellow card) | Vitória (A) | Campeonato Brasileiro | |
| 16 July | 1 | Gabriel | 3x (yellow card) | Vitória (A) | Campeonato Brasileiro | |
| 20 July | 1 | Paulinho | 3x (yellow card) | Gama (H) | Copa do Brasil | |
| 3 August | 1 | Luiz Felipe | 3x (yellow card) | América Mineiro (A) | Campeonato Brasileiro | |
| 7 August | 1 | Lucas Lima | 3x (yellow card) | Atlético Mineiro (H) | Campeonato Brasileiro | |
| 7 August | 1 | Vanderlei | (red card) vs América Mineiro | Atlético Mineiro (H) | Campeonato Brasileiro | |
| 21 August | 1 | Gustavo Henrique | 3x (yellow card) | Figueirense (H) | Campeonato Brasileiro | |
| 28 August | 1 | Thiago Maia | 3x (yellow card) | Internacional (A) | Campeonato Brasileiro | |
| 8 September | 1 | Lucas Lima | (yellow card) (yellow-red card) vs Internacional | Corinthians (H) | Campeonato Brasileiro | |
| 8 September | 1 | Ricardo Oliveira | 3x (yellow card) | Corinthians (H) | Campeonato Brasileiro | |
| 8 September | 1 | Victor Ferraz | 3x (yellow card) | Corinthians (H) | Campeonato Brasileiro | |
| 11 September | 1 | Jonathan Copete | 3x (yellow card) | Botafogo (A) | Campeonato Brasileiro | |
| 24 September | 1 | Elano | (yellow card) (yellow-red card) vs Sport | Atlético Paranaense (H) | Campeonato Brasileiro | |
| 13 October | 1 | Luiz Felipe | 3x (yellow card) | Grêmio (H) | Campeonato Brasileiro | |
| 29 October | 1 | Lucas Lima | 3x (yellow card) | Ponte Preta (A) | Campeonato Brasileiro | |
| 6 November | 1 | David Braz | 3x (yellow card) | Vitória (H) | Campeonato Brasileiro | |
| 17 November | 1 | Yuri | 3x (yellow card) | Cruzeiro (A) | Campeonato Brasileiro | |
| 20 November | 1 | Jean Mota | 3x (yellow card) | Flamengo (A) | Campeonato Brasileiro | |

=== Injuries ===
| Date | Pos. | Name | Injury | Note | Recovery time |
|---|---|---|---|---|---|
| 11 February | DF | (Brazil) Daniel Guedes | Tendinitis | | 3 months |
| 12 February | DF | (Brazil) Paulo Ricardo | Low back pain | | 3 months |
| 23 February | MF | (Brazil) Elano | Sprained ankle | During training | 3 weeks |
| 27 March | MF | (Brazil) Renato | Broken nose | Match against São Paulo | 15 days |
| 2 April | FW | (Brazil) Marquinhos | Appendicitis | N/A | 3 weeks |
| 19 April | MF | (Brazil) Elano | Back injury | During training | 1 week |
| 24 April | MF | (Brazil) Léo Cittadini | Sprained ankle | Match against Palmeiras | 1 month |
| 1 May | MF | (Brazil) Lucas Lima | Sprained ankle | Match against Audax | 2 weeks |
| 8 May | FW | (Brazil) Ricardo Oliveira | Tendinitis | N/A | 2 months |
| 10 May | FW | (Cameroon) Joel | Mumps | N/A | 6 days |
| 4 June | FW | (Brazil) Rodrigão | Sprained ankle | During training | 2 weeks |
| 8 June | DF | (Brazil) David Braz | Thigh injury | During training | 1 month |
| 10 June | GK | (Brazil) Vladimir | Calf strain | During training | 18 days |
| 10 June | DF | (Brazil) Lucas Veríssimo | Thigh injury | During training | 1 month |
| 10 June | FW | (Argentina) Maxi Rolón | Muscle discomfort | During training | 1 week |
| 17 June | MF | (Brazil) Lucas Lima | Muscle reconditioning | N/A | 5 days |
| 11 July | MF | (Brazil) Alison | Sprained knee | During training | 2 months |
| 24 July | MF | (Brazil) Lucas Lima | Thigh injury | Match against Vitória | 2 weeks |
| 2 August | FW | (Colombia) Jonathan Copete | Thigh injury | During training | 5 days |
| 13 September | DF | (Brazil) Luiz Felipe | Calf injury | During training | 5 days |
| 18 September | FW | (Brazil) Ricardo Oliveira | Thigh injury | Match against Santa Cruz | 11 days |
| 24 September | DF | (Brazil) Gustavo Henrique | Sprained knee | Match against Sport | 10 months |
| 24 September | MF | (Brazil) Vitor Bueno | Thigh injury | Match against Sport | 3 weeks |
| 30 September | GK | (Brazil) Vladimir | Sprained finger | During training | 5 weeks |
| 15 October | MF | (Argentina) Emiliano Vecchio | Thigh injury | During training | 3 days |
| 18 October | MF | (Brazil) Vitor Bueno | Thigh injury | During training | 19 days |
| 29 October | DF | (Brazil) Luiz Felipe | Sprained knee | Match against Palmeiras | 10 months |

=== Squad number changes ===
| Player | Position | Old n. | New n. | Prev. to wear | Notes | Source |
|---|---|---|---|---|---|---|
| (Brazil) Elano | MF | 22 | 11 | Geuvânio | | |
| (Brazil) Ronaldo Mendes | MF | 35 | 23 | Unassigned | | |
| (Brazil) Lucas Crispim | FW | 49 | 35 | Unassigned | | |
| (Brazil) Jean Mota | MF | — | 39 | Gregore | | |
| (Colombia) Jonathan Copete | FW | — | 36 | Diogo Vitor | | |
| (Argentina) Fabián Noguera | DF | — | 32 | Paulo Ricardo | | |
| (Brazil) Lucas Lima | MF | 20 | 10 | Gabriel | | |
| (Argentina) Emiliano Vecchio | MF | 40 | 20 | Lucas Lima | | |

== Managers ==
| Name | Nat. | Place of birth | Date of birth (age) | Signed from | Date signed | Role | Departure | Manner | Contract End |
|---|---|---|---|---|---|---|---|---|---|
| Dorival Júnior | (Brazil) | Araraquara (São Paulo (state)) | 25 April 1962 (age 64) | Free agent | 9 July 2015 | Permanent | | | 31 December 2017 |

== Transfers ==
=== Transfers in ===
| N | Pos. | Name | Age | Moving from | Fee | Source |
|---|---|---|---|---|---|---|
| 35 | SS | (Brazil) Lucas Crispim | 21 | Joinville | Free (Note: Loan return) | |
| 11 | AM | (Brazil) Elano | 34 | Chennaiyin (India) | Free | |
| — | ST | (Brazil) Stéfano Yuri | 21 | Náutico | Free | |
| — | SS | (Brazil) Diego Cardoso | 21 | Bragantino | Free | |
| 22 | AM | (Argentina) Patito Rodríguez | 25 | Johor (Malaysia) | Free | |
| — | AM | (Brazil) Pedro Castro | 22 | Santa Cruz | Free | |
| — | CB | (Brazil) Jubal | 21 | Avaí | Free | |
| 28 | CB | (Brazil) Lucas Veríssimo | 20 | Youth system | Free (Note: Promoted from the youth setup) | |
| 33 | GK | (Brazil) John Victor | 19 | Youth system | Free | |
| 31 | LW | (Argentina) Maxi Rolón | 21 | Barcelona B (Spain) | Free | |
| 2 | CB | (Brazil) Luiz Felipe | 22 | Paraná Clube | R$1M (Note: Santos retained 55% of the federative rights) | |
| 32 | CB | (Argentina) Fabián Noguera | 22 | Banfield (Argentina) | Free (Note: The deal will be effective only in May when his contract with Banfield ends) | |
| — | FW | (Brazil) Thiago Ribeiro | 30 | Atlético Mineiro | Free | |
| 22 | ST | (Brazil) Rodrigão | 22 | Campinense | R$1,5M (Note: The deal will be effective only in May when Campeonato Paraibano and Copa do Nordeste ends) | |
| 40 | AM | (Argentina) Emiliano Vecchio | 27 | Qatar SC | Free (Note: The deal will be effective only in July when his contract with Qatar SC ends) | |
| 36 | LW | (Colombia) Jonathan Copete | 28 | Atlético Nacional (Colombia) | R$5M | |
| — | GK | (Brazil) Gabriel Gasparotto | 22 | Capivariano | Free | |
| — | FW | (Brazil) Stéfano Yuri | 22 | Botafogo–SP | Free | |
| 39 | AM | (Brazil) Jean Mota | 22 | Fortaleza | R$ 800K | |
| — | SS | (Brazil) Diego Cardoso | 22 | Vila Nova | Free | |
| — | DF | (Brazil) Emerson Palmieri | 22 | Roma (Italy) | Free | |

=== Loans in ===
| N. | P | Name | Age | Loaned from | Loan expires | Source | Fee |
|---|---|---|---|---|---|---|---|
| 26 | SS | (Brazil) Paulinho | 27 | Flamengo | December 2016 | | R$ 300K |
| 30 | ST | (Cameroon) Joel | 22 | Cruzeiro | December 2016 | | Free |
| — | CB | (Brazil) Diego Silva | 22 | Náutico | December 2016 | | Free (Note: Originally signed for Santos B) |
| 23 | AM | (Brazil) Ronaldo Mendes | 23 | Comercial Viçosa | December 2016 | | Free |
| 19 | ST | (Brazil) Matheus Nolasco | 20 | Penapolense | December 2017 | | Free |
| 45 | LW | (Brazil) Walterson | 21 | São Bernardo | December 2016 | | Free |
| 25 | MF | (Brazil) Yuri | 21 | Audax | December 2017 | | Free |

=== Transfers out ===
| N. | Pos. | Name | Age | Moving to | Type | Fee | Source |
|---|---|---|---|---|---|---|---|
| 23 | LB | (Brazil) Chiquinho | 26 | Coimbra | Loan return | Free | |
| 7 | SS | (Brazil) Leandro | 22 | Palmeiras | Loan return | Free | |
| 39 | ST | (Brazil) Nilson | 24 | Cianorte | Loan return | Free | |
| 2 | CB | (Brazil) Werley | 27 | Grêmio | Loan return | Free | |
| 31 | AM | (Brazil) Marquinhos Gabriel | 25 | Al-Nassr (Saudi Arabia) | Loan return | Free | |
| — | RB | (Brazil) Crystian | 23 | Paysandu | End of contract | Free | |
| 24 | DM | (Italy) Cristian Ledesma | 33 | Free agent | Contract terminated | Free | |
| 44 | CB | (Brazil) Leonardo | 29 | Santa Cruz | Contract terminated | Free | |
| — | RB | (Brazil) Rafael Galhardo | 24 | Anderlecht (Belgium) | Transfer | R$4.4M (Note: Santos received R$ 3.6M (70%)) | |
| 11 | SS | (Brazil) Geuvânio | 23 | Tianjin Quanjian (China) | Transfer | R$48M (Note: Santos received R$ 17M (35%)) | |
| — | CB | (Brazil) Jubal | 22 | Arouca (Portugal) | Contract terminated | Free | |
| 40 | SS | (Brazil) Neto Berola | 28 | Atlético Mineiro | Loan return | Free | |
| 31 | SS | (Argentina) Maxi Rolón | 21 | Free agent | Contract terminated | Free | |
| 23 | MF | (Brazil) Ronaldo Mendes | 23 | Al-Wasl (United Arab Emirates) | Contract terminated | R$1M | |
| 21 | MF | (Brazil) Leandrinho | 22 | Rio Ave (Portugal) | Transfer | undisclosed | |
| 22 | MF | (Argentina) Patito Rodríguez | 26 | AEK (Greece) | End of Contract | Free | |
| 10 | ST | (Brazil) Gabriel | 19 | Internazionale (Italy) | Transfer | R$98M (Note: Santos received R$ 65M) | |
| 15 | MF | (Colombia) Edwin Valencia | 31 | Free agent | Rescinded | Free | |

=== Loans out ===
| N. | P | Name | Age | Loaned to | Loan expires | Source |
|---|---|---|---|---|---|---|
| 33 | GK | (Brazil) Gabriel Gasparotto | 22 | Capivariano | May 2016 | |
| — | SS | (Brazil) Diego Cardoso | 21 | Vila Nova | December 2016 | |
| — | ST | (Brazil) Stéfano Yuri | 21 | Botafogo–SP | May 2016 | |
| — | MF | (Brazil) Pedro Castro | 23 | Botafogo–PB | December 2016 | |
| — | ST | (Brazil) Leandro Damião | 26 | Real Betis (Spain) | July 2016 | |
| 25 | MF | (Brazil) Lucas Otávio | 21 | Paraná | December 2016 | |
| – | FW | (Brazil) Thiago Ribeiro | 30 | Bahia | December 2016 | |
| 19 | MF | (Brazil) Marquinhos | 26 | Oeste | May 2017 | |
| 32 | DF | (Brazil) Paulo Ricardo | 22 | Sion (Switzerland) | June 2017 | |
| 41 | MF | (Brazil) Serginho | 21 | Vitória | December 2016 | |
| — | DF | (Brazil) Emerson Palmieri | 22 | Roma (Italy) | June 2017 | |
| — | FW | (Brazil) Leandro Damião | 26 | Flamengo | June 2017 | |
| 35 | FW | (Brazil) Lucas Crispim | 22 | Atlético Goianiense | December 2016 | |

=== Overall transfer activity ===
Spending

Transfers in: ▼ (~ R$8,300,000)

Loans in: ▼ (~ R$300,000)

Total: ▼ (~ R$8,600,000)

Income

Transfers out: ▲ (~ R$86,600,000)

Loans out: ▲ (~ R$0,000,000)

Total: ▲ (~ R$86,600,000)

Balance

Profit/Loss: ▲ (~ R$78,000,000)

=== Contracts ===
| No. | Pos. | Nat. | Name | Age | Status | Contract length | Expiry date | Source |
|---|---|---|---|---|---|---|---|---|
| 15 | DM | (Colombia) | Edwin Valencia | 30 | Signed | 7 months | July 2016 | Globo Esporte |
| 19 | AM | (Brazil) | Marquinhos | 26 | Signed | 1 year | December 2016 | Santos FC |
| 41 | AM | (Brazil) | Serginho | 20 | Signed | 3 years | December 2018 | Terra |
| 4 | RB | (Brazil) | Victor Ferraz | 27 | Signed | 4 years | December 2019 | Glono Esporte |
| 33 | GK | (Brazil) | Gabriel Gasparotto | 22 | Signed | 2 years | December 2017 | Santos FC |
| 33 | GK | (Brazil) | John Victor | 19 | Signed | 5 years | January 2021 | Terra |
| 11 | MF | (Brazil) | Elano | 34 | Signed | 6 Months | December 2016 | Globo Esporte |
| 6 | DF | (Brazil) | Gustavo Henrique | 22 | Signed | 4 years | January 2020 | Santos FC |
| 28 | DF | (Brazil) | Lucas Veríssimo | 20 | Signed | 3 years | December 2019 | Globo Esporte |
| 8 | MF | (Brazil) | Renato | 36 | Signed | 1 year | December 2017 | Globo Esporte |
| 18 | MF | (Brazil) | Vitor Bueno | 21 | Signed | 4 years | May 2020 | Globo Esporte |
| 19 | AM | (Brazil) | Marquinhos | 26 | Signed | 1 year | December 2017 | Globo Esporte |
| 15 | DM | (Colombia) | Edwin Valencia | 31 | Signed | 5 months | December 2016 | Globo Esporte |
| 12 | GK | (Brazil) | Vladimir | 27 | Signed | 2 years | December 2018 | Ademir Quintino |
| 37 | LB | (Brazil) | Zeca | 22 | Signed | 4 years | December 2020 | Glono Esporte |

Last updated: 18 November 2016

== Pre-season and Friendlies ==
| 23 January Pre-season friendly | Bahia | 2–2 | Santos | Salvador |
| 18:30 UTC-03:00 | Paulo Roberto (yellow card) 15'; Hernane 48', 55' (pen.); Gustavo (yellow card) 68'; Hayner (yellow card) 90+3' | Report | 24' Gabriel; (yellow card) 28' Lucas Lima; (yellow card) 30' Victor Ferraz; (yellow card) 43' Alison; (yellow card) 54' (yellow-red card) 90+3' Caju; 90+1' Serginho | Stadium: Itaipava Arena Fonte Nova; Attendance: 10,429; Referee: Diego Pombo Lopez |

| 8 October Friendly | Santos | 1–1 | (Portugal) Benfica | Santos |
| 16:15 UTC-03:00 | Luiz Filipe (yellow card) 30'; Noguera 88' | Report | (yellow card) 27' Cervi; 47' (pen.) Salvio | Stadium: Vila Belmiro; Attendance: 10,149; Referee: Raphael Claus |

== Competitions ==
=== Overall ===
| Competition | Started round | Final position / round | First match | Last match |
|---|---|---|---|---|
| Campeonato Brasileiro | — | 2nd | 14 May | 11 December |
| Copa do Brasil | First round | Quarterfinals | 21 April | 19 October |
| Campeonato Paulista | Group stage | Winners | 31 January | 8 May |

Updated to match played 12 December 2016
Source: Competitions

=== Detailed overall summary ===
| | Total | Home | Away |
|---|---|---|---|
| Games played | 66 | 34 | 32 |
| Games won | 38 | 27 | 11 |
| Games drawn | 15 | 5 | 10 |
| Games lost | 13 | 2 | 11 |
| Biggest win | 4–1 v Mogi Mirim; 4–1 v Ferroviária | 4–1 v Mogi Mirim; 4–1 v Ferroviária | 3–0 v Galvez |
| Biggest loss | 0–2 v Red Bull Brasil; 0–2 v Internacional; 0–2 v Flamengo | 0–1 v Internacional; 0–1 v Figueirense | 0–2 v Red Bull Brasil; 0–2 v Internacional; 0–2 v Flamengo |
| Clean sheets | 26 | 17 | 9 |
| Goals scored | 110 | 70 | 40 |
| Goals conceded | 59 | 21 | 38 |
| Goal difference | +51 | +49 | +2 |
| Average GF per game | 1.67 | 2.06 | 1.25 |
| Average GA per game | 0.89 | 0.62 | 1.19 |
| Yellow cards (yellow card) | 133 | 63 | 70 |
| Red cards (red card) | 5 | 1 | 4 |
| Most appearances | Vanderlei (63) | Vanderlei (33) | Vanderlei (30) |
| Top scorer | Ricardo Oliveira (22) | Ricardo Oliveira (14) | Ricardo Oliveira (8) |
| Worst discipline | Lucas Lima (red card) (1) (yellow card) (15) | Lucas Lima (yellow card) (8) | Gustavo Henrique (red card) (1) (yellow card) (8) |
| Points | 129/198 (65.15%) | 86/102 (84.31%) | 43/96 (44.79%) |
| Winning rate | 57.58% | 79.41% | 34.38% |

Last updated: 12 December 2016
Source: Competitive matches

=== Campeonato Brasileiro ===
==== Results summary ====
| Overall | | | | | | | | Home | | | | | | Away | | | | | |
| Pld | W | D | L | GF | GA | GD | Pts | W | D | L | GF | GA | GD | W | D | L | GF | GA | GD |
|---|---|---|---|---|---|---|---|---|---|---|---|---|---|---|---|---|---|---|---|
| 38 | 22 | 5 | 11 | 59 | 35 | +24 | 71 | 15 | 2 | 2 | 36 | 11 | +25 | 7 | 3 | 9 | 23 | 24 | −1 |

Last updated: 12 December 2016.
Source: Soccerway

==== Results by round ====
| Round | 1 | 2 | 3 | 4 | 5 | 6 | 7 | 8 | 9 | 10 | 11 | 12 | 13 | 14 | 15 | 16 | 17 | 18 | 19 | 20 | 21 | 22 | 23 | 24 | 25 | 26 | 27 | 28 | 29 | 30 | 31 | 32 | 33 | 34 | 35 | 36 | 37 | 38 |
|---|---|---|---|---|---|---|---|---|---|---|---|---|---|---|---|---|---|---|---|---|---|---|---|---|---|---|---|---|---|---|---|---|---|---|---|---|---|---|
| Ground | A | H | A | H | A | H | A | H | A | A | H | A | H | A | H | A | H | H | A | H | A | H | A | H | A | H | A | H | H | A | H | A | H | A | H | A | A | H |
| Result | L | W | D | L | L | W | W | W | L | W | W | L | W | D | W | W | W | D | L | W | L | L | L | W | W | W | L | W | W | W | D | W | W | W | W | D | L | W |
| Position | 17 | 9 | 7 | 12 | 15 | 11 | 5 | 4 | 8 | 5 | 3 | 6 | 4 | 4 | 4 | 4 | 2 | 1 | 5 | 2 | 5 | 5 | 5 | 5 | 4 | 4 | 4 | 4 | 4 | 4 | 4 | 4 | 3 | 2 | 2 | 2 | 3 | 2 |

Updated to match(es) played on 12 December 2016. Source: Globo Esporte
W = Win; D = Draw; L = Loss

==== League table ====
| Pos | Team | Pld | W | D | L | GF | GA | GD | Pts | Qualification or relegation |
|---|---|---|---|---|---|---|---|---|---|---|
| 1 | Palmeiras (C) | 38 | 24 | 8 | 6 | 62 | 32 | +30 | 80 | Qualification for 2017 Copa Libertadores group stage |
| 2 | Santos | 38 | 22 | 5 | 11 | 59 | 35 | +24 | 71 | Qualification for 2017 Copa Libertadores group stage |
| 3 | Flamengo | 38 | 20 | 11 | 7 | 52 | 35 | +17 | 71 | Qualification for 2017 Copa Libertadores group stage |
| 4 | Atlético Mineiro | 38 | 17 | 11 | 10 | 61 | 53 | +8 | 62 (Note: The matchday 38 game between Chapecoense and Atlético Mineiro was cancelled after both teams declined to play following the Chapecoense team plane crash. Both teams received a double walkover (3–0 loss for each team).) | Qualification for 2017 Copa Libertadores group stage |
| 5 | Botafogo | 38 | 17 | 8 | 13 | 43 | 39 | +4 | 59 | Qualification for 2017 Copa Libertadores first stage |

Source: CBF
Rules for classification: 1) points; 2) wins; 3) goal difference; 4) goals scored; 5) head-to-head results; 6) least red cards received; 7) least yellow cards received; 8) draw.
(C) Champions

==== Matches ====
| 14 May 1 | Atlético Mineiro | 1–0 | Santos | Belo Horizonte |
| 18:30 UTC-03:00 | Cazares 15' (yellow card) 34'; Carlos Eduardo (yellow card) 56' | Report | (yellow card) 51' David Braz; (yellow card) 62' Gustavo Henrique | Stadium: Estádio Independência; Attendance: 5,403; Referee: Jailson Macedo Freitas |

| 22 May 2 | Santos | 2–1 | Coritiba | Santos |
| 11:00 UTC-03:00 | Victor Ferraz (yellow card) 22'; Zeca (yellow card) 24'; Vitor Bueno (yellow card) 30' (goal) 62'; Gustavo Henrique (yellow card) 53'; Ronaldo Mendes (yellow card) 90+6'; Renato 90+7' | Report | (yellow card) 18' Alan Santos; 20' (yellow card) 25' Kléber | Stadium: Vila Belmiro; Attendance: 7,472; Referee: Ricardo Marques Ribeiro |

| 25 May 3 | Figueirense | 2–2 | Santos | Florianópolis |
| 19:30 UTC-03:00 | Elicarlos (yellow card) 24'; Jaime (yellow card) 34'; Rafael Moura 38'; Gustavo Ermel 90+2' | Report | 42' (pen.) Vitor Bueno; 57' (pen.) Joel; (yellow card) 61' Rafael Longuine; (red card) 68' Gustavo Henrique; (yellow card) 72' Matheus Nolasco; (yellow card) 86' Paulinho | Stadium: Orlando Scarpelli; Attendance: 5,849; Referee: Wagner do Nascimento Magalhães |

| 29 May 4 | Santos | 0–1 | Internacional | Santos |
| 18:30 UTC-03:00 | Luiz Felipe (yellow card) 64' | Report | (yellow card) 35' William; 84' Aylon | Stadium: Vila Belmiro; Attendance: 4,468; Referee: André Luiz de Freitas Castro |

| 1 June 5 | Corinthians | 1–0 | Santos | São Paulo |
| 21:00 UTC-03:00 | Giovanni Augusto 82' | Report | (yellow card) 74' Zeca; (yellow card) 83' Vitor Bueno | Stadium: Arena Corinthians; Attendance: 30,187; Referee: Leandro Pedro Vuaden |

| 5 June 6 | Santos | 3–0 | Botafogo | São Paulo |
| 11:00 UTC-03:00 | Vitor Bueno 11'; Paulinho 35'; Thiago Maia (yellow card) 61'; Bruno Silva 70' (o.g.) | Report | (yellow card) 30' Leandro | Stadium: Pacaembu; Attendance: 16,530; Referee: Sandro Meira Ricci |

| 12 June 7 | Santa Cruz | 0–2 | Santos | Recife |
| 19:00 UTC-03:00 | Wallyson (yellow card) 70' | Report | (yellow card) 43' Paulinho; 45' (yellow card) 55' Zeca; 65' Joel | Stadium: Estádio do Arruda; Attendance: 16,464; Referee: Elmo Alves Resende Cunha |

| 15 June 8 | Santos | 2–0 | Sport | Santos |
| 21:00 UTC-03:00 | Gustavo Henrique (yellow card) 59'; Gabriel 66'; Vitor Bueno 88' | Report | (yellow card) 48' Luiz Antônio; (yellow card) 68' Edmílson; (yellow card) 89' Oswaldo | Stadium: Vila Belmiro; Attendance: 4,937; Referee: Leandro Pedro Vuaden |

| 18 June 9 | Atlético Paranaense | 1–0 | Santos | Curitiba |
| 18:00 UTC-03:00 | Giovanny (yellow card) 47'; Sidcley (yellow card) 66'; Paulo André 88' | Report | (yellow card) 82' Renato | Stadium: Arena da Baixada; Attendance: 15,359; Referee: Anderson Daronco |

| 22 June 10 | Fluminense | 2–4 | Santos | Cariacica |
| 21:45 UTC-03:00 | Marcos Júnior 14', 66'; Giovanni (yellow card) 83' | Report | 39' Rodrigão; 45+3', 51' Gabriel; 73' (yellow card) 87' Luiz Felipe | Stadium: Kléber Andrade; Attendance: 5,310; Referee: Rodolpho Toski Marques |

| 26 June 11 | Santos | 3–0 | São Paulo | São Paulo |
| 16:00 UTC-03:00 | Vitor Bueno 1'; Rodrigão 39'; Gabriel (yellow card) 60'; Lucas Lima (yellow card) 71' (goal) 90' | Report | (yellow card) 17' Calleri; (yellow card) 71' Hudson; (yellow card) 88' (yellow card) 90' (red card) Lugano | Stadium: Pacaembu; Attendance: 24,647; Referee: Raphael Claus |

| 29 June 12 | Grêmio | 3–2 | Santos | Porto Alegre |
| 19:30 UTC-03:00 | Giuliano 3'; Edílson (yellow card) 34'; Douglas 45' (yellow card) 75'; Marcelo Hermes 89'; Walace (yellow card) 90+4' | Report | (yellow card) 34' Lucas Lima; (yellow card) 62' (goal) 83' Zeca; 65' Copete; (yellow card) 84' Yuri | Stadium: Arena do Grêmio; Attendance: 13,088; Referee: Eduardo Tomaz De Aquino Valadão |

| 3 July 13 | Santos | 3–0 | Chapecoense | Santos |
| 16:00 UTC-03:00 | Rodrigão 61'; Copete 65' (yellow card) 66'; Yuri 87' | Report | (yellow card) 70' Josimar | Stadium: Vila Belmiro; Attendance: 10,322; Referee: Bruno Arleu de Araújo |

| 12 July 14 | Palmeiras | 1–1 | Santos | São Paulo |
| 20:30 UTC-03:00 | Mina 6'; Moisés (yellow card) 10'; Erik (yellow card) 18'; Arouca (yellow card) 85' | Report | (yellow card) 10' (goal) 56' Gabriel; (yellow card) 65' Zeca | Stadium: Allianz Arena; Attendance: 40,035; Referee: Wilton Pereira Sampaio |

| 16 July 15 | Santos | 3–1 | Ponte Preta | Santos |
| 18:30 UTC-03:00 | Victor Ferraz 22'; Thiago Maia (yellow card) 38'; Vitor Bueno 56'; Gabriel 72' (yellow card) 78'; Zeca (yellow card) 90+4' | Report | (yellow card) 24' William Pottker; (yellow card) 83' Wendel; 84' Roger | Stadium: Vila Belmiro; Attendance: 11,979; Referee: Marielson Alves Silva |

| 24 July 16 | Vitória | 2–3 | Santos | Salvador |
| 18:30 UTC-03:00 | Kanu 30'; José Welison (yellow card) 31'; Willian Farias (yellow card) 45+3'; Dagoberto (yellow card) 45+3'; Vander 71' | Report | 20' Vitor Bueno; 32' Copete; (yellow card) 44' Ricardo Oliveira; 82' Jean Mota; (yellow card) 85' Gustavo Henrique | Stadium: Barradão; Attendance: 9,244; Referee: Rodolpho Toski Marques |

| 31 July 17 | Santos | 2–0 | Cruzeiro | Santos |
| 16:00 UTC-03:00 | Ricardo Oliveira (yellow card) 28'; Vitor Bueno 61'; Lucas 74' (o.g.) | Report | (yellow card) 37' Willian | Stadium: Vila Belmiro; Attendance: 13,830; Referee: Wagner Reway |

| 3 August 18 | Santos | 0–0 | Flamengo | Cuiabá |
| 21:45 UTC-03:00 | Caju (yellow card) 82'; Luiz Felipe (yellow card) 90+1' | Report | (yellow card) 83' Éverton; (yellow card) 88' Rafael Vaz | Stadium: Arena Pantanal; Attendance: 21,799; Referee: Dewson Fernando Freitas |

| 7 August 19 | América Mineiro | 1–0 | Santos | Belo Horizonte |
| 11:00 UTC-03:00 | Gilson (yellow card) 38'; Leandro Guerreiro (yellow card) 61'; Juninho 90' | Report | (yellow card) 44' Lucas Lima; (red card) 79' Vanderlei | Stadium: Estádio Independência; Attendance: 2,893; Referee: Pablo dos Santos Alves |

| 14 August 20 | Santos | 3–0 | Atlético Mineiro | Santos |
| 16:00 UTC-03:00 | Gustavo Henrique 12' (yellow card) 70'; Luiz Felipe (yellow card) 50'; Victor Ferraz (yellow card) 55'; Ricardo Oliveira 69', 90+4'; Yuri (yellow card) 90+3' | Report | (yellow card) 50' Fred; (yellow card) 70' Victor; (yellow card) 74' Rafael Carioca; (yellow card) 79' Fábio Santos | Stadium: Vila Belmiro; Attendance: 10,250; Referee: Wagner do Nascimento Magalhães |

| 21 August 21 | Coritiba | 2–1 | Santos | Curitiba |
| 18:00 UTC-03:00 | Neto Berola (yellow card) 39'; Kléber 73'; Iago 86' | Report | (yellow card) 42' Léo Cittadini; (yellow card) 51' Gustavo Henrique; 59' Ricardo Oliveira; (yellow card) 90+3' Jean Mota | Stadium: Couto Pereira; Attendance: 7,972; Referee: Claudio Francisco Lima Silva |

| 28 August 22 | Santos | 0–1 | Figueirense | Santos |
| 11:00 UTC-03:00 | Copete (yellow card) 17'; Thiago Maia (yellow card) 47'; Renato (yellow card) 60' | Report | (yellow card) 24' Ferrugem; 48' (pen.) Rafael Moura; (yellow card) 90+3' Werley | Stadium: Vila Belmiro; Attendance: 11,456; Referee: Bruno Arleu de Araujo |

| 8 September 23 | Internacional | 2–1 | Santos | Porto Alegre |
| 21:00 UTC-03:00 | Anselmo (yellow card) 18'; Seijas 43' (yellow card) 90+2'; Fabinho (yellow card) 60'; Aylon 62'; Eduardo (yellow card) 89' | Report | (yellow card) 19' (yellow-red card) Lucas Lima; (yellow card) 26' Victor Ferraz; 28' (yellow card) 30' Ricardo Oliveira; (yellow card) 45+1' Gustavo Henrique | Stadium: Beira-Rio; Attendance: 29,996; Referee: Rodrigo Raposo |

| 11 September 24 | Santos | 2–1 | Corinthians | Santos |
| 16:00 UTC-03:00 | Copete (yellow card) 30'; Vitor Bueno 71' (pen.); Renato 85'; Vecchio (yellow card) 88' | Report | (yellow card) 27' Fagner; 37' Marlone | Stadium: Vila Belmiro; Attendance: 8,610; Referee: Raphael Claus |

| 14 September 25 | Botafogo | 0–1 | Santos | Rio de Janeiro |
| 19:30 UTC-03:00 | Bruno Silva (yellow card) 42'; Rodrigo Pimpão (yellow card) 80' | Report | 4' Zeca; (yellow card) 36' Jean Mota | Stadium: Arena Botafogo; Attendance: 11,422; Referee: Paulo Henrique Schleich Vollkopf |

| 18 September 26 | Santos | 3–2 | Santa Cruz | São Paulo |
| 18:30 UTC-03:00 | Copete 5'; Luiz Felipe (yellow card) 67'; Jean Mota 72'; Vitor Bueno 86' | Report | 40', 85' Keno; (yellow card) 74' Wellington Cézar | Stadium: Pacaembu; Attendance: 24,586; Referee: Francisco Carlos do Nascimento |

| 24 September 27 | Sport | 1–0 | Santos | Recife |
| 18:30 UTC-03:00 | Rogério 11'; Matheus Ferraz (yellow card) 26'; Neto Moura (yellow card) 41'; Vinícius Araújo (yellow card) 90' | Report | (yellow card) 15' Copete; (yellow card) 74' (yellow-red card) 74' Elano | Stadium: Ilha do Retiro; Attendance: 7,934; Referee: Elmo Alves Resende Cunha |

| 1 October 28 | Santos | 2–0 | Atlético Paranaense | Santos |
| 21:00 UTC-03:00 | Ricardo Oliveira 31' (pen.); Lucas Lima (yellow card) 47'; David Braz (yellow card) 67'; Paulinho 83' | Report | (yellow card) 45+1' Weverton | Stadium: Vila Belmiro; Attendance: 5,764; Referee: Pericles Bassols |

| 5 October 29 | Santos | 2–1 | Fluminense | Santos |
| 21:00 UTC-03:00 | Copete 48'; Ricardo Oliveira 80' | Report | 64' Wellington Silva | Stadium: Vila Belmiro; Attendance: 5,253; Referee: Igor Junior Benevenuto |

| 13 October 30 | São Paulo | 0–1 | Santos | São Paulo |
| 21:00 UTC-03:00 | Mena (yellow card) 45+2'; Robson (yellow card) 90+3' | Report | 46' (yellow card) 61' Copete; (yellow card) 48' Zeca; (yellow card) 89' Luiz Felipe | Stadium: Pacaembu; Attendance: 28,321; Referee: Anderson Daronco |

| 16 October 31 | Santos | 1–1 | Grêmio | Santos |
| 19:30 UTC-02:00 | Noguera 21'; Lucas Lima (yellow card) 52' | Report | 10' Everton; (yellow card) 34' Lincoln; (yellow card) 50' Guilherme; (yellow card) 51' Bruno Grassi; (yellow card) 74' Kannemann; (yellow card) 78' Maicon; (yellow card) 89' Rafael Thyere; (yellow card) 89' Wallace Oliveira | Stadium: Vila Belmiro; Attendance: 7,969; Referee: Pablo dos Santos Alves |

| 23 October 32 | Chapecoense | 0–1 | Santos | Chapecó |
| 19:30 UTC-02:00 | Gimenez (yellow card) 29'; Thiego (yellow card) 52' | Report | 4' Lucas Lima; (yellow card) 38' Victor Ferraz; (yellow card) 52' Luiz Felipe; (yellow card) 88' Vanderlei | Stadium: Arena Condá; Attendance: 7,459; Referee: Nielson Nogueira Dias |

| 29 October 33 | Santos | 1–0 | Palmeiras | Santos |
| 19:30 UTC-02:00 | Copete 67'; Lucas Lima (yellow card) 70'; Zeca (yellow card) 74'; Ricardo Oliveira (yellow card) 81'; Noguera (yellow card) 84' | Report | (yellow card) 45+2' Mina; (yellow card) 87' Moisés; (yellow card) 90+4' Gabriel Jesus | Stadium: Vila Belmiro; Attendance: 13,574; Referee: Dewson Fernando Freitas da Silva |

| 5 November 34 | Ponte Preta | 1–2 | Santos | Campinas |
| 21:00 UTC-02:00 | William Pottker 22' (pen.); Abuda (yellow card) 64' | Report | (yellow card) 24' David Braz; 67' Ricardo Oliveira; 89' Copete | Stadium: Moisés Lucarelli; Attendance: 10,208; Referee: Braulio da Silva Machado |

| 17 November 35 | Santos | 3–2 | Vitória | Santos |
| 19:30 UTC-02:00 | Yuri (yellow card) 27'; Copete 35', 84'; Thiago Maia (yellow card) 45+3'; Ricardo Oliveira (yellow card) 45+3' (goal) 68' (pen.) | Report | 62' (pen.) Marinho; (yellow card) 66' Diogo Mateus; 90+3' Serginho | Stadium: Vila Belmiro; Attendance: 9,258; Referee: Wilton Pereira Sampaio |

| 20 November 36 | Cruzeiro | 2–2 | Santos | Belo Horizonte |
| 17:00 UTC-02:00 | De Arrascaeta 22' (red card) 81'; Romero (yellow card) 61'; Henrique (yellow card) 69'; Alisson (yellow card) 77'; Manoel 89' | Report | (yellow card) 38' Lucas Lima; 48', 62' (pen.) Ricardo Oliveira; (yellow card) 70' Vanderlei; (yellow card) 90+2' Jean Mota | Stadium: Mineirão; Attendance: 11,442; Referee: Heber Roberto Lopes |

| 27 November 37 | Flamengo | 2–0 | Santos | Rio de Janeiro |
| 17:00 UTC-02:00 | Guerrero 5'; Diego 87' (yellow card) 87' | Report | | Stadium: Maracanã; Attendance: 33,924; Referee: Eduardo Tomaz de Aquino Valadão |

| 11 December 38 | Santos | 1–0 | América Mineiro | Santos |
| 17:00 UTC-02:00 | Ricardo Oliveira 49' | Report | (yellow card) 15' Juninho | Stadium: Vila Belmiro; Referee: Leandro Pedro Vuaden |

=== Copa do Brasil ===
==== First round ====
| 21 April 1st leg | Santos–AP | 1–1 | Santos | Macapá |
| 21:30 UTC-03:00 | Rafinha 45'; Armando (yellow card) 56'; Cavalo (yellow card) 70'; Fabinho (yellow card) 79' | Report | (yellow card) 58' Luiz Felipe; (yellow card) 74' Paulinho; 78' Joel; (yellow card) 88' Alison | Stadium: Zerão; Attendance: 503; Referee: Joelson Ferreira |

| 28 April 2nd leg | Santos | 3–0 (4–1 agg.) | Santos–AP | Santos |
| 19:30 UTC-03:00 | Elano (yellow card) 30'; Luiz Felipe 45+1'; Lucas Veríssimo (yellow card) 47'; Ronaldo Mendes 66'; Alison (yellow card) 71' (red card) 71'; Joel 82' | Report | (yellow card) 47' (red card) 71' Lessandro; (yellow card) 59' Rafinha; (yellow card) 65' Cavalo; (yellow card) 71' Pretão | Stadium: Vila Belmiro; Attendance: 5,712; Referee: William Machado Steffen |

==== Second round ====
| 11 May 1st leg | Galvez | 0–3 | Santos | Rio Branco |
| 17:30 UTC-05:00 | Gato (yellow card) 53'; Araújo Jordão (yellow card) 73'; Chumbo (yellow card) 84' | Report | 35' Rafael Longuine; 45' (yellow card) 56' Paulinho; (yellow card) 46' Lucas Veríssimo; 59' Fernando Medeiros | Stadium: Arena da Floresta; Attendance: 1,572; Referee: Rodrigo Nunes de Sá |

==== Third round ====
| 20 July 1st leg | Gama | 0–0 | Santos | Gama |
| 21:45 UTC-03:00 | | Report | (yellow card) 41' Gustavo Henrique; (yellow card) 83' Paulinho; (yellow card) 90+2' Lucas Lima | Stadium: Bezerrão; Attendance: 12,066; Referee: Adriano Milczvski |

| 27 July 2nd leg | Santos | 3–0 (3–0 agg.) | Gama | Santos |
| 21:45 UTC-03:00 | Ricardo Oliveira 26', 44' (pen.), 57' (pen.); Copete (yellow card) 65' | Report | (yellow card) 36' Murilo; (yellow card) 43' David; (yellow card) 45' Michel; (yellow card) 56' Adilson Maringá; (yellow card) 79' Pedrão; (yellow card) 80' Eduardo | Stadium: Vila Belmiro; Attendance: 9,883; Referee: Diego Pombo Lopez |

==== Round of 16 ====
| 24 August 1st leg | Santos | 3–1 | Vasco | Santos |
| 19:30 UTC-03:00 | Lucas Lima (yellow card) 15' (goal) 65'; Renato 30'; Ricardo Oliveira 37' | Report | (yellow card) 19' Mádson; (yellow card) 36' Diguinho; 90+6' Éder Luís | Stadium: Vila Belmiro; Attendance: 6,130; Referee: Héber Roberto Lopes |

| 21 September 2nd leg | Vasco | 2–2 (3–5 agg.) | Santos | Rio de Janeiro |
| 21:45 UTC-03:00 | Nenê 25'; Diguinho (yellow card) 45+1'; Douglas Luiz (yellow card) 67'; Éderson 70'; Andrezinho (red card) 87'; Rodrigo (red card) 90+5' | Report | 11' Copete; (yellow card) 41' Rodrigão; 83' (o.g.) Rodrigo; (yellow card) 86' Thiago Maia; (yellow card) 87' Zeca | Stadium: São Januário; Attendance: 17,393; Referee: Jean Pierre Goncalves Lima |

==== Quarter-finals ====
| 28 September 1st leg | Santos | 2–1 | Internacional | Santos |
| 19:30 UTC−03:00 | Copete 49'; Rodrigão 56'; Paulinho (yellow card) 90+1' | Report | (yellow card) 58' Artur; 72' Seijas; (yellow card) 90+1' Fernando Bob | Stadium: Vila Belmiro; Attendance: 6,592; Referee: Gilberto Rodrigues Castro Júnior |

| 19 October 2nd leg | Internacional | 2–0 (3–2 agg.) | Santos | Porto Alegre |
| 19:30 UTC−02:00 | Aylon 10'; Andrigo (yellow card) 27'; Eduardo Sasha 88' | Report | | Stadium: Beira Rio; Attendance: 15,065; Referee: Wagner do Nascimento Magalhães (Rio de Janeiro) |

=== Campeonato Paulista ===
==== Results summary ====
| Overall | | | | | | | | Home | | | | | | Away | | | | | |
| Pld | W | D | L | GF | GA | GD | Pts | W | D | L | GF | GA | GD | W | D | L | GF | GA | GD |
|---|---|---|---|---|---|---|---|---|---|---|---|---|---|---|---|---|---|---|---|
| 19 | 11 | 7 | 1 | 34 | 17 | +17 | 40 | 8 | 3 | 0 | 22 | 8 | +14 | 3 | 4 | 1 | 12 | 9 | +3 |

Last updated: 8 May 2016.
Source: Globo Esporte

==== Group stage ====
| Pos | Team | Pld | W | D | L | GF | GA | GD | Pts | Qualification or relegation |
|---|---|---|---|---|---|---|---|---|---|---|
| 1 | Santos (Q) | 15 | 9 | 5 | 1 | 28 | 14 | +14 | 32 | Advance to the quarter-finals |
| 2 | São Bento (Q) | 15 | 7 | 6 | 2 | 21 | 11 | +10 | 27 | Advance to the quarter-finals |
| 3 | Linense (E) | 15 | 4 | 8 | 3 | 21 | 19 | +2 | 20 | |
| 4 | Botafogo-SP (E) | 15 | 4 | 7 | 4 | 15 | 14 | +1 | 19 | |
| 5 | Oeste (R) | 15 | 3 | 4 | 8 | 13 | 20 | −7 | 13 | Relegated |

(E) Eliminated; (Q) Qualified for the phase indicated; (R) Relegated

==== Matches ====
| 30 January 1 | Santos | 1–1 | São Bernardo | Santos |
| 17:00 UTC-02:00 | Gabriel (yellow card) 57' (goal) 81' | Report | 10' Luciano Castán; (yellow card) 29' Léo Veloso; (yellow card) 66' Paulo Marcelo | Stadium: Vila Belmiro; Attendance: 9,341; Referee: José Claudio Rocha Filho |

| 3 February 2 | Ponte Preta | 0–2 | Santos | Campinas |
| 21:45 UTC-02:00 | Eurico (yellow card) 22'; Rhayner (yellow card) 70'; Alexandro (yellow card) 71'; Jeferson (yellow card) 77'; Ferron (yellow card) 85' | Report | 10' Ricardo Oliveira; 38' (pen.) Gabriel; (yellow card) 45' Paulinho; (yellow card) 56' Lucas Lima; (yellow card) 85' Lucas Veríssimo | Stadium: Moisés Lucarelli; Attendance: 7,004; Referee: Marcelo Aparecido Ribeiro |

| 6 February 3 | Santos | 2–1 | Ituano | Santos |
| 11:00 UTC-02:00 | Gustavo Henrique 45+3'; Elano (yellow card) 89'; Ricardo Oliveira 90+7' (pen.); Lucas Lima (yellow card) 90+9' | Report | (yellow card) 21' (red card) 90+6' Raul Prata; (yellow card) 38' Luiz Felipe; (yellow card) 38' Claudinho; (yellow card) 45+2' Peri; 82' (yellow card) 90+2' Naylhor | Stadium: Vila Belmiro; Attendance: 5,501; Referee: Douglas Marques das Flores |

| 13 February 4 | Novorizontino | 3–3 | Santos | Novo Horizonte |
| 21:00 UTC-02:00 | Pereira 53'; Fagner 68'; Lima 72' (yellow card) 82' | Report | 40' Gabriel; 58' Lucas Lima; 85' Victor Ferraz | Stadium: Jorjão; Attendance: 8,505; Referee: Luiz Vanderlei Martinucho |

| 20 February 5 | Palmeiras | 0–0 | Santos | São Paulo |
| 17:00 UTC-02:00 | Matheus Sales (yellow card) 48'; Gabriel Jesus (yellow card) 63'; Alecsandro (yellow card) 90+3' | Report | (yellow card) 34' Victor Ferraz; (yellow card) 73' Ricardo Oliveira; (yellow card) 80' Elano; (yellow card) 83' Zeca; (yellow card) 84' Léo Cittadini; (yellow card) 88' Gustavo Henrique | Stadium: Allianz Parque; Attendance: 23,181; Referee: Raphael Claus |

| 25 February 6 | Santos | 4–1 | Mogi Mirim | São Paulo |
| 19:30 UTC-03:00 | Bruno Costa 26' (o.g.); Joel 51', 74'; Gustavo Henrique (yellow card) 60'; Lucas Lima 90+1' (pen.) | Report | (yellow card) 35' Renato Santos; (yellow card) 51' Gabriel Dias; (yellow card) 65' Bruno Teles; 83' Wendel; (yellow card) 90+3' Lulinha | Stadium: Pacaembu; Attendance: 11,371; Referee: Alessandro Darcie |

| 28 February 7 | RB Brasil | 2–0 | Santos | São José dos Campos |
| 19:30 UTC-03:00 | Everton Silva (yellow card) 25'; Thiago Galhardo 38'; Luan (yellow card) 48'; Dráusio (yellow card) 70'; Breno Lopes (yellow card) 78'; Roger 88' | Report | | Stadium: Martins Pereira; Attendance: 6,191; Referee: Vinícius Gonçalves Dias Araújo |

| 6 March 8 | Santos | 2–0 | Corinthians | Santos |
| 16:00 UTC-03:00 | Ricardo Oliveira 9', 85'; Victor Ferraz (yellow card) 71'; Lucas Lima (yellow card) 83' | Report | | Stadium: Vila Belmiro; Attendance: 9,635; Referee: Flávio Rodrigues Souza |

| 12 March 9 | Santos | 1–0 | Água Santa | São Paulo |
| 18:30 UTC-03:00 | Rafael Longuine 30'; Thiago Maia (yellow card) 31'; Ronaldo Mendes (yellow card) 90+1' | Report | (yellow card) 17' Rafael Santiago; (yellow card) 27' (red card) 56' André Rocha; (yellow card) 48' Jonathan | Stadium: Pacaembu; Attendance: 16,035; Referee: Vinícius Furlan |

| 15 March 11 | XV de Piracicaba | 0–1 | Santos | Piracicaba |
| 19:30 UTC-03:00 | Henrique Santos (yellow card) 53'; Clayton (yellow card) 68' | Report | (yellow card) 22' Lucas Veríssimo; 41' Gustavo Henrique; (yellow card) 71' Victor Ferraz | Stadium: Barão da Serra Negra; Attendance: 5,919; Referee: Alessandro Darcie |

| 20 March 10 | Rio Claro | 0–0 | Santos | Rio Claro |
| 18:30 UTC-03:00 | Rodrigo Celeste (yellow card) 31'; João Paulo (yellow card) 46'; Léo Coelho (yellow card) 71' | Report | (yellow card) 58' Thiago Maia | Stadium: Schmidtão; Attendance: 2,323; Referee: Rafael Gomes Felix da Silva |

| 27 March 12 | Santos | 1–1 | São Paulo | Santos |
| 18:30 UTC-03:00 | Joel 59'; Neto Berola (yellow card) 90+2' | Report | 83' Alan Kardec; (yellow card) 90' Lucas Fernandes | Stadium: Vila Belmiro; Attendance: 6,239; Referee: Marcelo Aparecido Ribeiro de Souza |

| 31 March 13 | Santos | 4–1 | Ferroviária | Santos |
| 19:30 UTC-03:00 | Gabriel (yellow card) 23' (goal) 90+3' (pen.); Zeca 63'; Paulinho 72', 76'; Lucas Lima (yellow card) 75' | Report | 33' Tiago Marques; (yellow card) 50' Thallyson; (yellow card) 61' Fernando Gabriel | Stadium: Vila Belmiro; Attendance: 4,208; Referee: Luiz Vanderlei Martinucho |

| 3 April 14 | Capivariano | 3–5 | Santos | Capivari |
| 18:30 UTC-03:00 | Bruno Maia 23', 45+3'; Wigor (yellow card) 75'; Jacio (yellow card) 81'; Kleiton Domingues 90+2' | Report | 27' (o.g.) Fabrício; 31', 59' Ricardo Oliveira; (yellow card) 50' Gustavo Henrique; (yellow card) 64' (goal) 67' Vitor Bueno; (yellow card) 72' Vanderlei; (yellow card) 84' Thiago Maia; (yellow card) 86' Elano; (yellow card) 87' (goal) 88' Gabriel | Stadium: Arena Capivari; Attendance: 2,541; Referee: Rodrigo Guarizo do Amaral |

| 10 April 15 | Santos | 2–1 | Audax | Santos |
| 16:00 UTC-03:00 | Léo Cittadini 59'; Zeca (yellow card) 67'; Ronaldo Mendes 88' | Report | 44' Wellington; (yellow card) 45+2' Sidão; (yellow card) 54' Gabriel Nunes; (yellow card) 90+2' Tchê Tchê | Stadium: Vila Belmiro; Attendance: 12,368; Referee: Rafael Gomes Felix da Silva |

==== Knockout stage ====
===== Quarter-final =====
| 16 April Quarter-final | Santos | 2–0 | São Bento | Santos |
| 18:30 UTC-03:00 | Vitor Bueno 9', 41'; David Braz (yellow card) 75' | Report | | Stadium: Vila Belmiro; Attendance: 12,051; Referee: Vinícius Gonçalves Dias Araújo |

===== Semi-final =====
| 24 April Semi-final | Santos | 2–2 (3–2 p) | Palmeiras | Santos |
| 16:00 UTC-03:00 | Gabriel 40', 74' (yellow card) 45+4'; Elano (yellow card) 45+1'; Vitor Bueno (yellow card) 75' | Report | (yellow card) 17' Egídio; (yellow card) 45+3' Alecsandro; (yellow card) 55' Gabriel; (yellow card) 57' Thiago Martins; (yellow card) 61' Matheus Sales; 88', 89' Rafael Marques; (yellow card) 90' Vagner; (yellow card) 90+4' Vitor Hugo | Stadium: Vila Belmiro; Attendance: 13,690; Referee: Marcelo Aparecido de Souza |
| | Penalties |
| | Lucas Lima (penalty missed); David Braz (penalty scored); Zeca (penalty scored); Victor Ferraz (penalty scored) | | (penalty scored) Cleiton Xavier; (penalty missed) Barrios; (penalty scored) Jean; (penalty missed) Rafael Marques; (penalty missed) Fernando Prass |

===== Finals =====
| 1 May 1st leg | Audax | 1–1 | Santos | Osasco |
| 16:00 UTC-03:00 | André Castro (yellow card) 40'; Mike 58'; Wellington (yellow card) 75' | Report | (yellow card) 60' Lucas Lima; 80' Ronaldo Mendes; (yellow card) 86' Gustavo Henrique | Stadium: José Liberatti; Attendance: 12,269; Referee: Flávio Rodrigues de Souza |

| 8 May 2nd leg | Santos | 1–0 (2–1 agg.) | Audax | Santos |
| 16:00 UTC-03:00 | Victor Ferraz (yellow card) 3'; Ricardo Oliveira 45'; Gustavo Henrique (yellow card) 51'; Thiago Maia (yellow card) 54'; Gabriel (yellow card) 69' | Report | (yellow card) 69' Velicka; (yellow card) 80' Bruno Paulo | Stadium: Vila Belmiro; Attendance: 16,018; Referee: Raphael Claus |
