= Cavalo =

Cavalo (Portuguese "horse") may refer to:

- Cavalo, Dienison Gomes do Carmo (born 1991), Brazilian footballer
- Anderson Cavalo (born 1986), Brazilian footballer
- João Carlos Cavalo (born 1967), Brazilian footballer and manager
- Roberto Cavalo (born 1963), Brazilian footballer
- Cavalo (album), a 2013 album by Rodrigo Amarante

== See also ==
- Bife a cavalo, or bife com ovo a cavalo, traditional dish in Portugal and Brazil
- Cavalo Dinheiro, 2014 Portuguese film
- Cavalo de Aço, 1973 Brazilian telenovela
