= Walterson =

Brazilian footballer

Personal information
- Full name: Walterson Silva
- Date of birth: 28 December 1994 (age 31)
- Place of birth: Janaúba, Brazil
- Height: 1.80 m (5 ft 11 in)
- Position: Winger

Team information
- Current team: Paju Frontier
- Number: 7

Youth career
- 2012–2013: São Bernardo

Senior career*
Years	Team	Apps	(Gls)
2013–2018	São Bernardo	25	(6)
2015	→ Guarani-MG (loan)	7	(0)
2016	→ Santos (loan)	2	(0)
2017	→ Atlético Goianiense (loan)	6	(0)
2017	→ Figueirense (loan)	3	(0)
2018	→ Santo André (loan)	0	(0)
2018	→ São Bento (loan)	9	(1)
2018–2020	Famalicão	51	(11)
2020–2023	Moreirense	86	(10)
2023	Suwon FC	10	(1)
2024	Chapecoense	9	(0)
2024	São Bernardo	5	(0)
2025	Ituano	12	(0)
2026–	Paju Frontier	6	(0)
- * Club domestic league appearances and goals as of 6 August 2026

Walterson Silva (born 28 December 1994), simply known as Walterson, is a Brazilian footballer who plays as a winger for K League 2 club, Paju Frontier.

== Club career ==
Born in Janaúba, Minas Gerais, Walterson joined São Bernardo FC's youth setup in 2012 at the age of 17. The following year he was promoted to the first team, and made his senior debut on 3 August of that year by coming on as a half-time substitute in a 1–0 Copa Paulista home win against Juventus.

After being rarely used in the 2014 campaign, Walterson was loaned to Guarani de Divinópolis until the end of 2015 Campeonato Mineiro. He made seven appearances for the side, all from the bench, before returning to his parent club.

Walterson became a first team regular in 2016, contributing with 13 appearances and three goals. He scored his first goals on 26 March, netting a brace in a 4–1 away routing of Rio Claro.

On 4 May 2016, Walterson was loaned to Santos until the end of the year, being initially assigned to the B-team. He made his first team – and Série A – debut on 8 September, replacing Vitor Bueno in a 1–2 away loss against Internacional.

On 23 December 2016, after failing to reach an agreement, Walterson was released by Peixe and returned to his parent club. The following 7 April, he was loaned to fellow top tier club Atlético Goianiense until the end of the year.

On 14 April 2018, after playing the Campeonato Paulista in Santo André, he was announced in São Bento for Campeonato Brasileiro Série B.

On 10 January 2026, Walterson announcement official signing to K League 2 promoted club, Paju Frontier for 2026 season.

== Career statistics ==
As of 10 January 2026.

Club	Season	League			State League		Cup		League Cup		Continental		Other		Total	
Club	Season	Division	Apps	Goals	Apps	Goals	Apps	Goals	Apps	Goals	Apps	Goals	Apps	Goals	Apps	Goals
São Bernardo	2013	Paulista	—		0	0	—		—		—		9 (Note: Appearance(s) in Copa Paulista)	0	9	0
São Bernardo	2014	Paulista	—		0	0	2	0	—		—		12	0	14	0
São Bernardo	2015	Paulista	—		0	0	—		—		—		13	3	13	3
São Bernardo	2016	Paulista	—		13	3	—		—		—		—		13	3
São Bernardo	2017	Paulista	—		12	3	—		—		—		—		12	3
São Bernardo	Total		0	0	25	6	2	0	—		—		34	3	61	9
Guarani-MG (loan)	2015	Mineiro	—		7	0	—		—		—		—		7	0
Santos (loan)	2016	Série A	2	0	—		0	0	—		—		8	4	10	4
Atlético Goianiense (loan)	2017	Série A	6	0	—		2	0	—		—		—		8	0
Figueirense (loan)	2017	Série B	3	0	—		—		—		—		—		3	0
Santo André (loan)	2018	Paulista	—		10	2	—		—		—		—		10	2
São Bento (loan)	2018	Série B	9	1	—		—		—		—		—		9	1
Famalicão	2018–19	LigaPro	33	11	—		1	0	—		—		—		34	11
Famalicão	2019–20	Primeira Liga	17	0	—		1	0	3	0	—		—		21	0
Famalicão	2020–21	Primeira Liga	2	0	—		0	0	—		—		—		2	0
Famalicão	Total		52	11	—		2	0	3	0	—		—		57	11
Moreirense	2020–21	Primeira Liga	32	2	—		3	1	—		—		—		35	3
Moreirense	2021–22	Primeira Liga	25	1	—		1	0	1	0	—		1 (Note: Appearance(s) in Primeira Liga relegation play-offs)	0	28	1
Moreirense	2022–23	Liga Portugal 2	29	7	—		3	0	4	0	—		—		36	7
Moreirense	Total		86	10	—		7	1	5	0	—		1	0	61	11
Suwon FC	2023	K League 1	10	1	—		0	0	—		—		1 (Note: Appearance(s) in K League 1 relegation play-offs)	0	11	1
Chapecoense	2024	Serie B	7	0	—		—		—		—		—		7	0
São Bernardo	2024	Série C	5	0	—		—		—		—		—		5	0
Ituano FC	2025	Série C	12	0	—		—		—		—		—		12	0
Paju Frontier	2026	K League 2	0	0	—		0	0	—		—		0	0	0	0
Career total			157	21	42	8	10	0	8	0	0	0	44	7	260	39

== Honours ==
- Moreirense
  - Liga Portugal 2: 2022–23
