= Gabriel Gasparotto =

Brazilian footballer (born 1993)

Personal information
- Full name: Gabriel Bordinhão Gasparotto
- Date of birth: 9 December 1993 (age 32)
- Place of birth: Lucélia, Brazil
- Height: 1.96 m (6 ft 5 in)
- Position: Goalkeeper

Team information
- Current team: Paraná
- Number: 1

Youth career
- 2009–2013: Santos

Senior career*
Years	Team	Apps	(Gls)
2013–2017	Santos	0	(0)
2016	→ Capivariano (loan)	1	(0)
2017	→ Ferroviária (loan)	0	(0)
2018–2020	Arouca	2	(0)
2020–2021	São Bernardo	27	(0)
2021	→ Novorizontino (loan)	0	(0)
2022	Ferroviária	0	(0)
2022	Mirassol	3	(0)
2023	Figueirense	10	(0)
2023	Botafogo-SP	0	(0)
2024	Chapecoense	8	(0)
2025–	Paraná	5	(0)

International career^{‡}
2013	Brazil U20	1	(0)
- * Club domestic league appearances and goals as of 11 November 2023 ‡ National team caps and goals as of 5 June 2013

Gabriel Bordinhão Gasparotto (born 9 December 1993) is a Brazilian footballer who plays as a goalkeeper for Paraná.

== Club career ==
Born in Lucélia, São Paulo, Gasparotto joined Santos FC's youth setup in 2009, aged 16. He was promoted to the main squad in February 2013, being hazed by Neymar.

Late in the month, Gasparotto suffered a knee injury, returning to action in April. On 24 September 2013, he renewed his link with the club until 2016.

On 16 January 2016, Gasparotto extended his link for a further year, and was immediately loaned to Capivariano until the end of 2016 Campeonato Paulista. He made his senior debut on 10 April, starting in a 0–2 away loss against Botafogo-SP, as his side was already relegated.

On 2 March 2017, Gasparotto was loaned to Ferroviária until the end of the 2017 Campeonato Paulista. The following 1 January he moved abroad, signing for Primeira Liga side Arouca as his contract with Santos expired.

== International career ==
On 10 October 2012 Gasparotto was called up to Brazil under-20s for the 2013 South American Youth Football Championship, but was later cut out from the squad. On 20 May 2013 he was called up for that year's Toulon Tournament, appearing in one match.

== Career statistics ==
As of 23 December 2022

Club	Season	League			State League		Cup		Continental		Other		Total	
Club	Season	Division	Apps	Goals	Apps	Goals	Apps	Goals	Apps	Goals	Apps	Goals	Apps	Goals
Santos	2013	Série A	0	0	0	0	0	0	—		—		0	0
Santos	2014	Série A	0	0	0	0	0	0	—		—		0	0
Santos	2015	Série A	0	0	0	0	0	0	—		—		0	0
Santos	2016	Série A	0	0	0	0	0	0	—		7 (Note: Appearance(s) in Copa Paulista)	0	7	0
Santos	2017	Série A	0	0	—		—		—		6	0	6	0
Santos	Subtotal		0	0	0	0	0	0	—		13	0	13	0
Capivariano (loan)	2016	Paulista	—		1	0	0	0	—		—		1	0
Ferroviária (loan)	2017	Paulista	—		0	0	—		—		—		0	0
Arouca	2017–18	LigaPro	1	0	—		0	0	—		—		1	0
Arouca	2018–19	LigaPro	1	0	—		—		—		0	0	1	0
Arouca	Subtotal		2	0	—		0	0	—		0	0	2	0
São Bernardo	2020	Paulista A2	—		6	0	—		—		12	0	18	0
São Bernardo	2021	Paulista A2	—		21	0	—		—		—		21	0
São Bernardo	Subtotal		—		27	0	—		—		12	0	39	0
Novorizontino (loan)	2021	Série C	0	0	—		—		—		—		0	0
Ferroviária	2022	Série D	0	0	0	0	—		—		—		0	0
Mirassol	2022	Série C	3	0	—		—		—		—		3	0
Figueirense	2023	Série C	0	0	10	0	—		—		—		10	0
Botafogo-SP	2023	Série B	0	0	—		—		—		—		0	0
Chapecoense	2024	Série B	0	0	0	0	—		—		—		0	0
Career total			5	0	38	0	0	0	0	0	25	0	68	0
