= Vanderlei (footballer, born 1984) =

Brazilian footballer

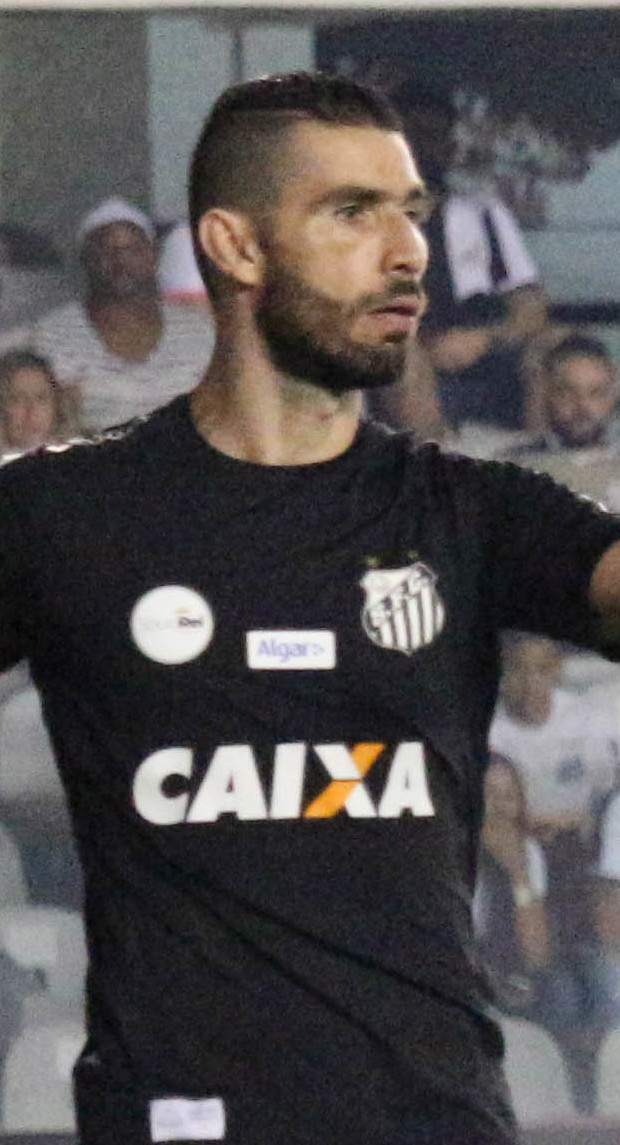
- Vanderlei with Santos

Personal information
- Full name: Vanderlei Farias da Silva
- Date of birth: 1 February 1984 (age 42)
- Place of birth: Porecatu, Brazil
- Height: 1.95 m (6 ft 5 in)
- Position: Goalkeeper

Team information
- Current team: Vila Nova
- Number: 1

Youth career
- Londrina

Senior career*
Years	Team	Apps	(Gls)
2004–2005	Londrina	0	(0)
2006	Olímpia	15	(0)
2007	Paranavaí	24	(0)
2007–2015	Coritiba	301	(0)
2015–2019	Santos	251	(0)
2020–2021	Grêmio	59	(0)
2021–2022	Vasco da Gama	35	(0)
2022	→ Operário Ferroviário (loan)	33	(0)
2023	Vila Nova	18	(0)
2024–	Mirassol	0	(0)
- * Club domestic league appearances and goals as of 8 April 2022

Vanderlei Farias da Silva (born 1 February 1984), simply known as Vanderlei, is a Brazilian footballer who plays as a goalkeeper for Mirassol.

== Club career ==
=== Early career ===
Born in Porecatu, Paraná, Vanderlei made his senior debuts for locals Londrina in 2004. In 2006, he moved to Olímpia, appearing with the side in that year's Copa Paulista.

Vanderlei joined Paranavaí in January 2007. An undisputed starter for the side, he appeared in 24 matches as his side were champions of Campeonato Paranaense; he also kept two clean sheets in the final matches against Paraná.

=== Coritiba ===
On 8 May 2007 Vanderlei signed with Série B side Coritiba. He made his debut for the club four days later, starting in a 3–1 home win against Paulista. However, after the arrival of Édson Bastos, he acted mainly as a backup and appeared in only one further match, as his side returned to Série A after a three-year absence.

In mid-2008, after profiting from Bastos' injury, Vanderlei was handed a starting spot, which lasted until the former's return. He played his 100th match for the club on 2 October 2011, starting in a 0–0 away draw against Figueirense.

Vanderlei and Bastos shared spells as starters in the following campaigns. The latter left the club in 2012, and he was definitely appointed as the club's first-choice; he appeared in his 200th match for Coxa on 28 March 2013, in a 1–1 draw against Nacional.

On 30 November 2014 Vanderlei played his 300th match for Coxa, making several key stops in a 2–1 home win against Atlético Mineiro. He appeared in all league matches during the season as his side narrowly avoided relegation.

Vanderlei left Coritiba with 301 official appearances, being the eight with more appearances for the club overall.

=== Santos ===
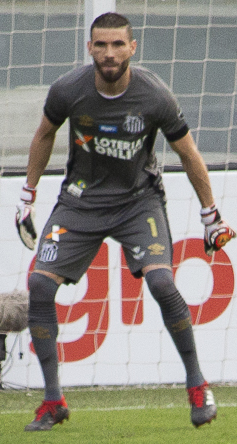
Vanderlei in action for Santos in 2018

On 23 January 2015 Vanderlei moved to fellow top-level side Santos, after agreeing to a three-year contract. He made his debut for his new club on 8 February, starting in a 2–1 home win against Red Bull Brasil.

On 27 March 2015, Vanderlei suffered a facial injury in a 1–3 away loss against Ponte Preta, after colliding with Rildo. He subsequently underwent surgery, and was sidelined for three months, eventually losing his first-choice status to Vladimir.

After Vladimir's poor form, Vanderlei was again chosen as a first-choice in a 1–3 home loss against Grêmio. He finished the year as an undisputed starter, contributing with 28 league appearances.

Vanderlei was an important unit for Peixe during their 2016 Campeonato Paulista winning campaign, saving two penalties in the semifinals against Palmeiras. He made his 100th game for the club on 28 September of that year, starting in a 2–1 Copa do Brasil home win against Internacional.

On 20 January 2017, Santos' president Modesto Roma Júnior confirmed the extension of Vanderlei's contract until December 2020. He made his Copa Libertadores debut on 19 April, starting in a 0–0 away draw against Independiente Santa Fe.

Vanderlei played his 200th match for Peixe on 6 June 2018, starting in a 1–1 away draw against Corinthians. During the 2019 season, under new manager Jorge Sampaoli, he lost his starting spot to new signing Everson.

=== Grêmio ===
On 18 January 2020, Vanderlei was announced at fellow first division side Grêmio, after agreeing to a two-year deal.

== Career statistics ==
As of 18 July 2020

Club	Season	League			State League		National Cup		Continental		Other		Total	
Club	Season	Division	Apps	Goals	Apps	Goals	Apps	Goals	Apps	Goals	Apps	Goals	Apps	Goals
Olímpia	2006	Paulista A2	—		15	0	—		—		12 (Note: Appearance(s) in Copa Paulista)	0	27	0
Paranavaí	2007	Série C	0	0	24	0	—		—		—		24	0
Coritiba	2007	Série B	2	0	—		—		—		—		2	0
Coritiba	2008	Série A	24	0	0	0	4	0	—		—		28	0
Coritiba	2009	Série A	20	0	21	0	6	0	1 (Note: Appearance(s) in Copa Sudamericana)	0	—		48	0
Coritiba	2010	Série A	8	0	1	0	0	0	—		—		9	0
Coritiba	2011	Série A	20	0	2	0	0	0	—		—		22	0
Coritiba	2012	Série A	36	0	23	0	12	0	2	0	—		73	0
Coritiba	2013	Série A	36	0	23	0	2	0	3	0	—		64	0
Coritiba	2014	Série A	38	0	10	0	7	0	—		—		55	0
Coritiba	Subtotal		184	0	80	0	31	0	6	0	—		301	0
Santos	2015	Série A	28	0	10	0	10	0	—		—		48	0
Santos	2016	Série A	37	0	19	0	7	0	—		—		63	0
Santos	2017	Série A	37	0	5	0	4	0	8 (Note: Appearance(s) in Copa Libertadores)	0	—		54	0
Santos	2018	Série A	37	0	15	0	4	0	8	0	—		64	0
Santos	2019	Série A	6	0	14	0	1	0	2	0	—		23	0
Santos	Subtotal		145	0	63	0	26	0	18	0	—		252	0
Grêmio	2020	Série A	0	0	9	0	0	0	2	0	—		11	0
Career total			329	0	191	0	57	0	26	0	12	0	615	0

== Honours ==
=== Club ===
Paranavaí

- Campeonato Paranaense: 2007

Coritiba

- Campeonato Brasileiro Série B: 2007, 2010
- Campeonato Paranaense: 2008, 2010, 2011, 2012, 2013

Santos

- Campeonato Paulista: 2015, 2016

Grêmio

- Campeonato Gaúcho: 2020

=== Individual ===
- Campeonato Paulista Team of the Year: 2016
- Bola de Prata: 2017
- Campeonato Brasileiro Team of the Year: 2017
- Campeonato Brasileiro Série A most clean sheets: 2017
- Best Goalkeeper in Brazil: 2018
