= Clayton (footballer, born November 1988) =

Brazilian footballer

Personal information
- Full name: Clayton Ely Oriani Junior
- Date of birth: 8 November 1988 (age 38)
- Place of birth: Piracicaba, Brazil
- Height: 1.78 m (5 ft 10 in)
- Position: Midfielder

Team information
- Current team: Ypiranga de Erechim

Senior career*
Years	Team	Apps	(Gls)
2008	XV de Piracicaba		
2008	Caxias		
2009	Olímpia		
2009	União Barbarense		
2011	Palmeirinha		
2012	Barretos		
2012–2016	XV de Piracicaba	43	(0)
2017	Mogi Mirim	6	(0)
2018	Bragantino	1	(0)
2019	São Luiz	15	(1)
2019	Ferroviária	6	(0)
2020–2021	Ypiranga de Erechim	65	(3)
2022	Figueirense	18	(1)
2023–	Ypiranga de Erechim	21	(1)
- * Club domestic league appearances and goals as of 26 August 2023

Clayton Ely Oriani Junior (born 8 November 1988), simply known as Clayton, is a Brazilian footballer who plays for Ypiranga de Erechim as midfielder.

== Career statistics ==
As of 12 January 2017

Club	Season	League			State League		Cup		Conmebol		Other		Total	
Club	Season	Division	Apps	Goals	Apps	Goals	Apps	Goals	Apps	Goals	Apps	Goals	Apps	Goals
Palmeirinha	2011	Paulista B	—		15	2	—		—		—		15	2
Barretos	2012	Paulista A3	—		5	0	—		—		—		5	0
XV de Piracicaba	2012	Paulista	—		0	0	—		—		16 (Note: All appearance(s) in Copa Paulista)	0	16	0
XV de Piracicaba	2013	Paulista	—		2	0	—		—		20	0	22	0
XV de Piracicaba	2014	Paulista	—		0	0	—		—		20	1	20	1
XV de Piracicaba	2015	Paulista	—		11	0	—		—		6	0	17	0
XV de Piracicaba	2016	Paulista	—		11	0	—		—		21	1	32	1
XV de Piracicaba	Subtotal		—		24	0	—		—		83	2	107	2
Career total			0	0	44	2	0	0	0	0	83	2	127	3
