= Porecatu Airport =

Airport serving Porecatu, Brazil

Porecatu Airport Aeroporto de Porecatu
- IATA: none; ICAO: SSPK

Summary
- Airport type: Private
- Serves: Porecatu
- Closed: 2016 (temporarily)
- Time zone: BRT (UTC−03:00)
- Elevation AMSL: 434 m (1,424 ft)
- Coordinates: 22°46′44″S 051°21′41″W

Map
- Location in Brazil SSPK (Brazil)

Runways
Direction	Length		Surface
Direction	m	ft	Surface
15/34	2,060	6,758	Asphalt
- Sources: ANAC

Porecatu Airport (ICAO: SSPK) is the airport serving Porecatu, Brazil. It was closed in 2016.

== History ==
On November 10, 2016 the operational license of the facility was revoked.

== Accidents and incidents ==
- 18 August 2000: a VASP Boeing 737-2A1 registration PP-SMG en route from Foz do Iguaçu to Curitiba was hijacked by 5 persons with the purpose of robbing BRL 5 million (approximately US$2.75 million at that time) that the aircraft was transporting. The pilot was forced to land at Porecatu, where the hijackers fled with the money. There were no victims.

== Access ==
The airport is located 3 km (2 mi) from downtown Porecatu.

== See also ==
- List of airports in Brazil
