= Matheus Nolasco =

Brazilian footballer

Personal information
- Full name: Matheus Nolasco de Oliveira Silva
- Date of birth: 21 April 1995 (age 31)
- Place of birth: Brasília, Brazil
- Height: 1.76 m (5 ft 9 1/2 in)
- Position: Forward

Team information
- Current team: Ceilândia
- Number: 19

Youth career
- Santos
- Atlético Mineiro

Senior career*
Years	Team	Apps	(Gls)
2014–2019	Penapolense	8	(0)
2015	→ Vila Nova (loan)	2	(0)
2016–2017	→ Santos (loan)	4	(0)
2018	→ Portuguesa (loan)	4	(0)
2018	→ Linense (loan)	10	(1)
2018	→ Rio Claro (loan)	12	(0)
2020	Capivariano	8	(2)
2021	Rio Branco AC	8	(3)
2022	Nacional AM	0	(0)
2023	Taguatinga	9	(1)
2023–	Ceilândia	35	(0)
- * Club domestic league appearances and goals as of 12:52, 5 February 2025 (UTC)

Matheus Nolasco de Oliveira Silva (born 21 April 1995), known as Matheus Nolasco or Somália, is a Brazilian footballer who plays for Ceilândia as a forward.

== Club career ==
Born in Brasília, Distrito Federal, Matheus Nolasco was an Atlético Mineiro youth graduate. In 2015, after finishing his formation, he was released and joined Penapolense.

In March 2015, after a trial period, Matheus Nolasco was loaned to Vila Nova until the end of the year. In July, after appearing in only two matches as a substitute in the Campeonato Goiano Segunda Divisão, he returned to his parent club and appeared in the year's Copa Paulista.

On 2 February 2016, Matheus Nolasco was loaned to Santos until December 2017, being initially assigned to the B-team. He made his first team – and Série A – debut on 14 May, replacing Ronaldo Mendes in the 64th minute of a 0–1 away loss against Atlético Mineiro.

== Career statistics ==
As of 2 November 2020

Club	Season	League			State League		Cup		Continental		Other		Total	
Club	Season	Division	Apps	Goals	Apps	Goals	Apps	Goals	Apps	Goals	Apps	Goals	Apps	Goals
Penapolense	2015	Paulista	—		—		—		—		4 (Note: Appearance (s) in Copa Paulista)	0	4	0
Penapolense	2019	Paulista A2	—		4	0	—		—		—		4	0
Penapolense	Total		—		4	0	—		—		4	0	8	0
Vila Nova (loan)	2015	Série C	—		2	0	—		—		—		2	0
Santos (loan)	2016	Série A	4	0	—		0	0	—		12	0	16	0
Santos (loan)	2017	Série A	0	0	—		—		—		0	0	0	0
Santos (loan)	Total		4	0	—		0	0	—		12	0	16	0
Portuguesa (loan)	2018	Paulista A2	—		4	0	—		—		—		4	0
Linense (loan)	2018	Série D	11	1	—		—		—		—		11	1
Rio Claro (loan)	2018	Paulista A2	—		0	0	—		—		6	0	6	0
Capivariano	2020	Paulista A3	—		8	2	—		—		—		8	2
Career total			15	1	18	2	0	0	0	0	22	0	55	3
