= Marquinhos (footballer, born June 1989) =

Brazilian footballer

Marquinho
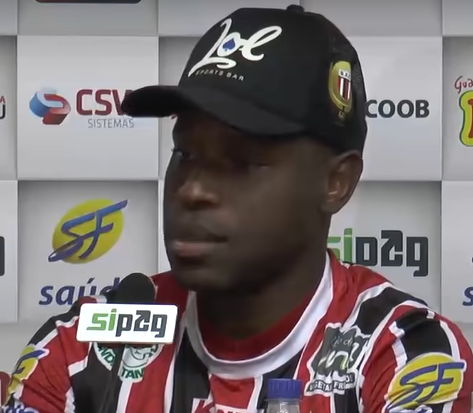
- Marquinho in 2018

Personal information
- Full name: Marco da Silva Ignácio
- Date of birth: 15 June 1989 (age 37)
- Place of birth: Vassouras, Brazil
- Height: 1.69 m (5 ft 6 1/2 in)
- Position: Attacking midfielder

Team information
- Current team: Real Noroeste

Youth career
- Paulista

Senior career*
Years	Team	Apps	(Gls)
2009–2011	Paulista	20	(2)
2009	→ Votoraty (loan)	10	(2)
2011	Vila Nova	4	(0)
2012–2013	Atlético Sorocaba	27	(2)
2013–2015	Audax	22	(1)
2014	→ Guaratinguetá (loan)	17	(2)
2015	→ Santos (loan)	7	(0)
2016–2017	Santos	0	(0)
2016	→ Oeste (loan)	25	(3)
2017	→ Audax (loan)	7	(1)
2018	São Bento	3	(0)
2018	Botafogo–SP	5	(0)
2019	Mirassol	7	(1)
2019	Ituano	13	(2)
2019	Sport Recife	10	(1)
2020	Água Santa	5	(0)
2020	Ituano	19	(0)
2021	Coimbra	10	(0)
2021	São Bernardo	5	(0)
2022–	Real Noroeste	8	(0)
- * Club domestic league appearances and goals as of 21:16, 15 November 2022 (UTC)

Marco da Silva Ignácio (born 15 June 1989), commonly known as Marquinho, is a Brazilian footballer. Mainly an attacking midfielder, he can also play as a wing back.

== Club career ==
Born in Vassouras, Rio de Janeiro, Marquinhos graduated with Paulista's youth setup, and made his senior debuts while on loan at Votoraty in 2009. He returned to the former in 2010, and appeared with the side in Campeonato Paulista.

On 30 August 2011 Marquinhos moved to Vila Nova, until the end of the year. He made his debut for the club on 2 September, starting in a 1–1 away draw against Ponte Preta for the Série B championship.

After appearing rarely, Marquinhos joined Atlético Sorocaba on 7 December 2011. On 25 June 2013 he signed for Audax, after featuring regularly with his previous team.

Marquinhos also represented Guaratinguetá in 2014, on loan, after a partnership with Audax was agreed. In 2015, he returned to his parent club, being an undisputed starter during that year's Paulistão.

On 15 May 2015 Marquinhos signed for Santos, on loan until the end of the year. He made his debut for the club on 3 June, coming on as a second-half substitute for Geuvânio in a 2–3 Série A away loss against São Paulo.

On 2 June 2016, Marquinhos renewed with Peixe until 2017 and was immediately loaned to Oeste.

On 28 December 2017 Marquinhos signed for São Bento.

== Career statistics ==
As of 30 October 2023

Club	Season	League			State League		Cup		Continental		Other		Total	
Club	Season	Division	Apps	Goals	Apps	Goals	Apps	Goals	Apps	Goals	Apps	Goals	Apps	Goals
Votoraty	2009	Paulista A3	—		10	2	—		—		—		10	2
Paulista	2009	Paulista	—		—		—		—		15 (Note: Appearance(s) in Copa Paulista)	4	15	4
Paulista	2010	Paulista	—		11	1	—		—		21	2	32	3
Paulista	2011	Paulista	—		10	1	—		—		—		10	1
Paulista	Subtotal		—		21	2	—		—		36	6	57	8
Vila Nova	2011	Série B	4	0	—		—		—		—		4	0
Atlético Sorocaba	2012	Paulista A2	—		19	2	—		—		19	1	38	3
Atlético Sorocaba	2013	Paulista	—		8	0	—		—		—		8	0
Atlético Sorocaba	Subtotal		—		27	2	—		—		19	1	46	3
Audax	2013	Paulista A2	—		—		—		—		21	2	21	2
Audax	2014	Paulista	—		7	1	—		—		—		7	1
Audax	2015	Paulista	—		15	0	—		—		—		15	0
Audax	Subtotal		—		22	1	—		—		21	2	43	3
Guaratinguetá	2014	Série C	17	2	—		—		—		—		17	2
Santos	2015	Série A	5	0	—		2	0	—		—		7	0
Santos	2016	Série A	0	0	0	0	0	0	—		—		0	0
Santos	2017	Série A	0	0	—		—		—		21	2	21	2
Santos	Subtotal		5	0	0	0	2	0	0	0	21	2	28	2
Oeste	2016	Série B	25	3	—		—		—		—		25	3
Audax	2017	Série D	0	0	7	1	1	0	—		—		8	1
São Bento	2018	Série B	—		3	0	—		—		—		3	0
Botafogo-SP	2018	Série C	5	0	—		—		—		—		5	0
Mirassol	2019	Paulista	—		7	1	—		—		—		7	1
Ituano	2019	Série D	13	2	—		—		—		—		13	2
Sport Recife	2019	Série B	10	1	—		—		—		—		10	1
Água Santa	2020	Paulista	—		5	0	—		—		—		5	0
Ituano	2020	Série C	19	0	—		—		—		—		19	0
Coimbra	2021	Mineiro	—		10	0	—		—		—		10	0
São Bernardo	2021	Paulista A2	—		5	0	—		—		—		5	0
Real Noroeste	2022	Série D	8	0	11	2	2	0	—		7 (Note: Appearance(s) in Copa Espírito Santo)	0	28	2
Iporá	2023	Série D	—		11	0	—		—		—		11	0
Career total			106	8	139	11	5	0	0	0	104	11	354	30

== Honours ==
Paulista

- Copa Paulista: 2010
