= Rafael Oller =

Brazilian footballer (born 1995)

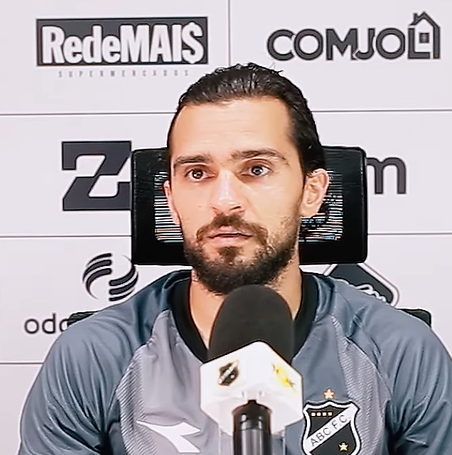

Personal information
- Full name: Rafael Oller Pereira
- Date of birth: 24 February 1995 (age 31)
- Place of birth: Barra Bonita, Brazil
- Height: 1.78 m (5 ft 10 in)
- Position: Attacking midfielder

Team information
- Current team: Inter de Limeira
- Number: 7

Youth career
- São Carlos
- 2015: → Santos (loan)

Senior career*
Years	Team	Apps	(Gls)
2013–2016	São Carlos	15	(6)
2016	→ Santos (loan)	0	(0)
2017	URT	23	(1)
2018	Uberaba	12	(3)
2018	URT	6	(3)
2018–2019	América Mineiro	0	(0)
2019	→ URT (loan)	6	(0)
2019	Ferroviária	3	(0)
2020	Anápolis	9	(2)
2020	Portuguesa Santista	2	(0)
2020–2025	Operário Ferroviário	69	(6)
2022	→ Mirassol (loan)	8	(0)
2024	→ Água Santa (loan)	16	(1)
2025	→ Marcílio Dias (loan)	13	(2)
2025	→ ABC (loan)	3	(1)
2026–	Inter de Limeira	21	(4)
- * Club domestic league appearances and goals as of 9 November 2026

Rafael Oller Pereira (born 24 February 1995), known as Rafael Oller, is a Brazilian footballer who plays as an attacking midfielder for Inter de Limeira.

== Club career ==
Oller was born in Barra Bonita, São Paulo, and joined São Carlos' youth setup in 2013. He made his senior debut on 14 July of that year, aged 18, by coming on as a half-time substitute in a 0–1 home loss against Inter de Limeira, for the year's Copa Paulista.

In June, after impressing with the under-20s, Oller moved to Hellas Verona on loan, but could not play for the club due to paperwork issues. Upon returning, he moved to Santos also on loan.

Oller appeared with the main squad once, being an unused substitute in a 3–0 Copa do Brasil away win against Galvez on 11 May 2016. The following 3 January, he joined URT for the ensuing Campeonato Mineiro.

For the 2018 season, Oller represented Uberaba, URT and América Mineiro's under-23 squad. Promoted to América's first team for the 2019 campaign, he returned to URT for a third spell in February, on loan.

Announced by Uberaba in March 2019, Oller joined Ferroviária instead on 8 May. He moved to Anápolis on 6 January of the following year, playing in the Campeonato Goiano for the club before agreeing to a contract with Portuguesa Santista on 5 August. In December 2020 Rafael Oller was hired to reinforce the Operário PR for the Série B sequence with a contract until May 2021 With his good performances, he won the ge.com poll as the most beautiful Serie B goal and was nominated for the 2021 Puskas awards. led the club to renew with the player until December 2021.

== Career statistics ==
As of 11 November 2025

Club	Season	League			State League		Cup		Continental		Other		Total	
Club	Season	Division	Apps	Goals	Apps	Goals	Apps	Goals	Apps	Goals	Apps	Goals	Apps	Goals
São Carlos	2013	Paulista A2	—		0	0	—		—		7 (Note: Appearance(s) in Copa Paulista)	0	7	0
São Carlos	2014	Paulista A3	—		15	6	—		—		—		15	6
São Carlos	Total		—		15	6	—		—		7	0	22	6
Santos (loan)	2016	Série A	0	0	—		0	0	—		11	2	11	2
URT	2017	Série D	12	1	11	0	1	0	—		—		24	1
Uberaba	2018	Mineiro Módulo II	—		12	3	—		—		—		12	3
URT	2018	Série D	6	3	—		—		—		—		6	3
URT	2019	Série D	0	0	6	0	2	0	—		—		8	0
Ferroviário	2019	Série D	3	0	—		—		—		16	1	19	3
Anápolis	2020	Goiano	—		9	2	—		—		—		9	2
Portuguesa Santista	2020	Paulista A2	—		2	0	—		—		4	3	6	3
Operário Ferroviário	2020	Série B	11	4	—		—		—		—		11	4
Operário Ferroviário	2021	Série B	21	0	9	1	2	0	—		—		32	1
Operário Ferroviário	2022	Série B	2	0	—		—		—		—		2	0
Operário Ferroviário	2023	Série C	12	0	9	1	—		—		—		21	1
Operário Ferroviário	2024	Série B	1	0	—		—		—		—		1	0
Operário Ferroviário	2025	Série B	—		4	0	—		—		—		4	0
Operário Ferroviário	Total		47	4	22	2	2	0	—		—		71	6
Mirassol (loan)	2022	Série C	—		8	0	1	0	—		—		9	0
Água Santa (loan)	2024	Série D	9	1	7	0	—		—		—		16	1
Marcílio Dias (loan)	2025	Série D	13	2	—		—		—		—		13	2
ABC (loan)	2025	Série C	3	1	—		—		—		—		3	1
Career total			93	12	92	13	6	0	0	0	38	6	229	33
