= Sociedade Esportiva Palmeirinha =

Palmeirinha
- Full name: Sociedade Esportiva Palmeirinha
- Nickname(s): Fúria Verde; Periquito
- Founded: April 3, 1955
- Ground: Estádio Vila Formosa, Porto Ferreira, São Paulo state, Brazil
- Capacity: 5,558
Home colours	Away colours

Sociedade Esportiva Palmeirinha, commonly known as Palmeirinha, is a currently inactive Brazilian football club based in Porto Ferreira, São Paulo state. The club was formerly known as Juvenil Feitiço and as Feitiço Atlético Clube.

== History ==
The club was founded on April 3, 1955, by supporters of Sociedade Esportiva Palmeiras, adopting similar name and colors. Palmeirnha means Little Palmeira. They professionalized its football department in 1967.

== Stadium ==
Sociedade Esportiva Palmeirinha play their home games at Estádio Municipal de Porto Ferreira, nicknamed Estádio Vila Formosa. The stadium has a maximum capacity of 5,558 people.
