= Lucélia =

- Municipality
- Flag Coat of arms

- Location in São Paulo state

- Location in Brazil
- Coordinates: 21°43′13″S 51°1′8″W
- Country: Brazil
- Region: Southeast
- State: São Paulo

Area
  - Total: 315 km^{2} (122 sq mi)

Population (2020)
  - Total: 21,886
  - Density: 69.5/km^{2} (180/sq mi)
- Time zone: UTC−3 (BRT)

Lucélia is a municipality in the state of São Paulo in Brazil. The population is 21,886 (2020 est.) in an area of 315 km^{2} (122 sq mi). The elevation is 438 m.

== History ==
The municipality was created by state law in 1944.

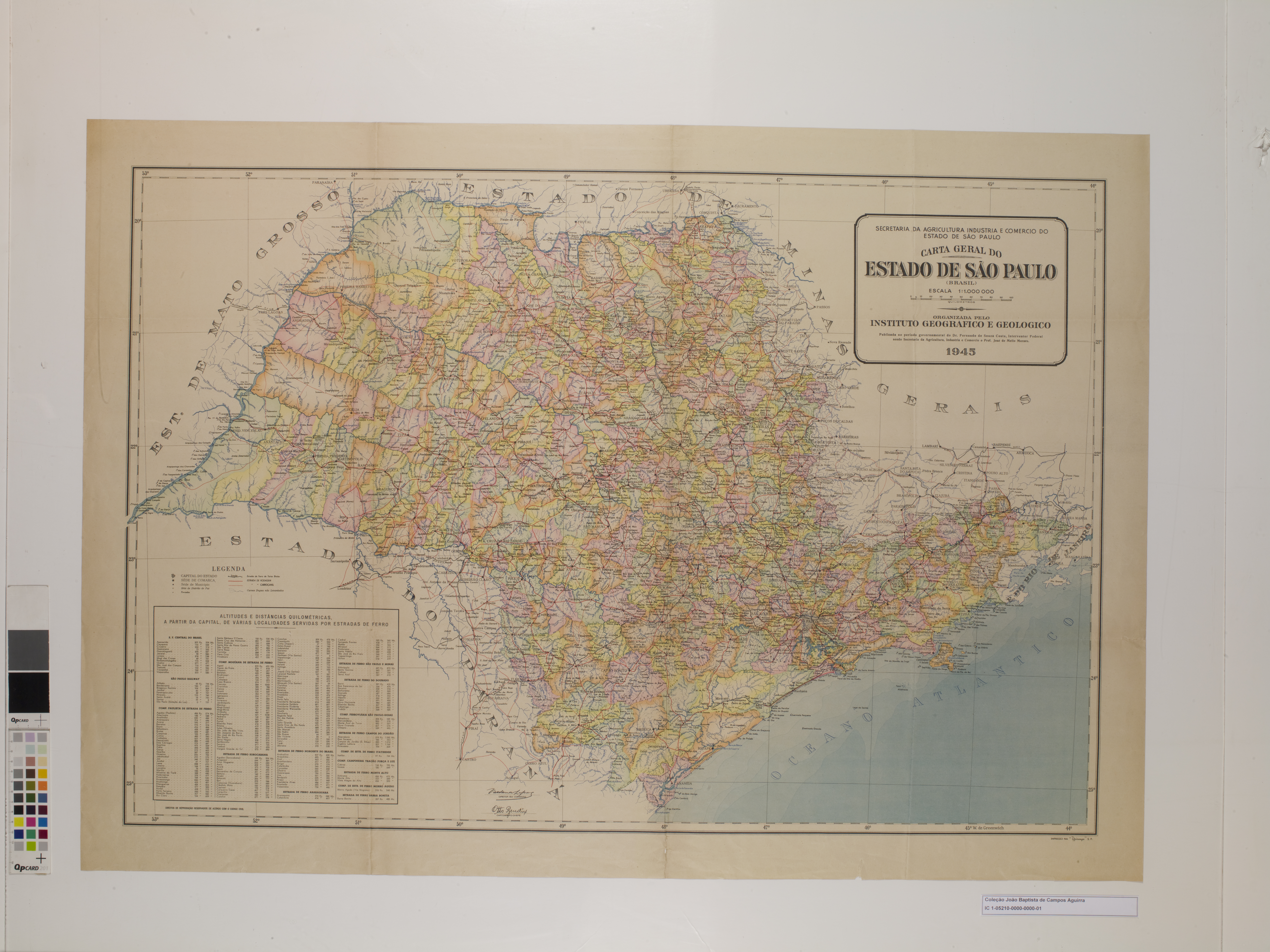
Map of the state of São Paulo (1944).

== Demographics ==
Historical population (municipality)
Year	Population	%±
1950	29,900	—
1960	23,834	−20.3%
1970	20,472	−14.1%
1980	18,710	−8.6%
1991	19,286	3.1%
2000	18,316	−5.0%
2010	19,882	8.5%
2022	20,061	0.9%

== Media ==
In telecommunications, the city was served by Telecomunicações de São Paulo. In July 1998, this company was acquired by Telefónica, which adopted the Vivo brand in 2012. The company is currently an operator of cell phones, fixed lines, internet (fiber optics/4G) and television (satellite and cable).

== Religion ==
Christianity is present in the city as follows:

=== Catholic Church ===
The Catholic church in the municipality is part of the Roman Catholic Diocese of Marília.

=== Protestant Church ===
The most diverse evangelical beliefs are present in the city, mainly Pentecostal, including the Assemblies of God in Brazil (the largest evangelical church in the country), Christian Congregation in Brazil, among others. These denominations are growing more and more throughout Brazil.

== See also ==
- List of municipalities in São Paulo
