= Porecatu =

City in Brazil

Coordinates: 22°45′21″S 51°22′44″W

- Municipality
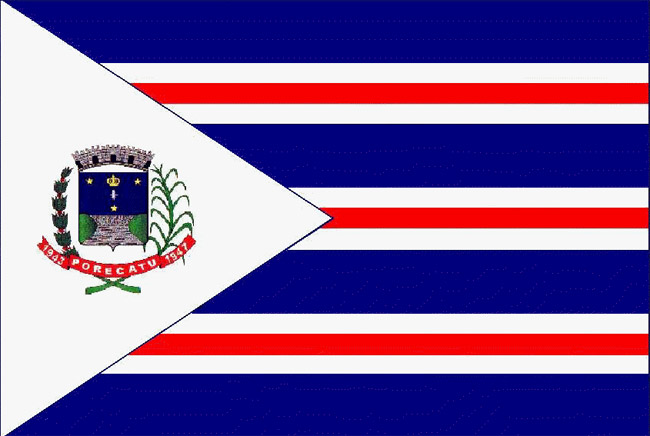
- Flag
- Interactive map of Porecatu
- Country: Brazil
- Time zone: UTC−3 (BRT)

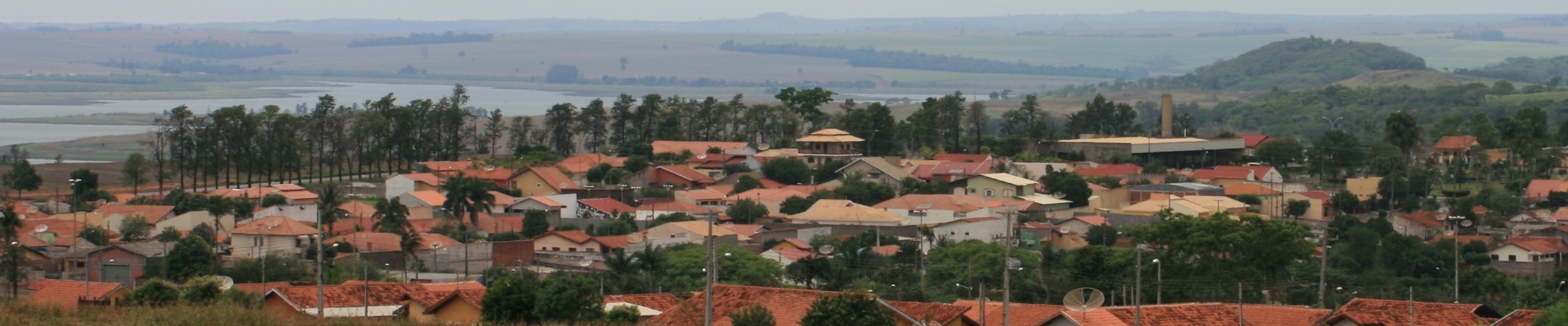

Porecatu is a city in the state of Paraná, Brazil, located at around, at the margins of the Paranapanema River. Its economy is mainly based on agriculture with the sugarcane being the most important product. As of 2020, the estimated population was 12,748.

The city is served by Porecatu Airport.

== History ==
Porecatu was the main place of a violent conflict between government forces and landless workers during the decade of 1940, before the official creation of the city. This conflict was called Porecatu War (Portuguese: "Guerra de Porecatu").

== Notable people ==
- Vanderlei Farias da Silva Football player
