= Claudinho (footballer, born 1991) =

Brazilian footballer

Personal information
- Full name: Cláudio Pereira da Silva Júnior
- Date of birth: 2 September 1991 (age 35)
- Place of birth: Rio de Janeiro, Brazil
- Height: 1.74 m (5 ft 8 1/2 in)
- Position: Forward

Team information
- Current team: Guarani

Senior career*
Years	Team	Apps	(Gls)
2011–2014	Botafogo–PB	0	(0)
2012	→ Santa Cruz–PB (loan)	0	(0)
2013	→ Araripina (loan)	0	(0)
2013–2014	→ Chã Grande (loan)	0	(0)
2014–2017	Ituano	19	(4)
2016	→ Joinville (loan)	9	(0)
2017–	Guarani	4	(0)
- * Club domestic league appearances and goals as of 6 June 2017 (UTC)

Cláudio Pereira da Silva Júnior (born 2 September 1991), known as Claudinho, is a Brazilian footballer who plays for Guarani as a forward.

== Career statistics ==
As of 22 February 2017

Club	Season	League			State League		Cup		Continental		Other		Total	
Club	Season	Division	Apps	Goals	Apps	Goals	Apps	Goals	Apps	Goals	Apps	Goals	Apps	Goals
Botafogo–PB	2012	Paraibano	—		9	1	—		—		—		9	1
Chã Grande	2013	Pernambucano	—		16	2	—		—		—		16	2
Chã Grande	2014	Pernambucano	—		2	0	—		—		—		2	0
Chã Grande	Subtotal		—		18	2	—		—		—		18	2
Ituano	2014	Série D	8	1	5	0	—		—		—		13	1
Ituano	2015	Paulista	—		11	1	7	0	—		16 (Note: All appearance(s) in Copa Paulista)	3	34	4
Ituano	2016	Série D	11	3	12	0	—		—		—		23	3
Ituano	2017	Paulista	—		5	0	—		—		—		5	0
Ituano	Subtotal		19	4	33	1	7	0	—		16	3	75	8
Joinville	2016	Série B	9	0	—		—		—		—		9	0
Career total			28	4	60	4	7	0	—		16	3	111	11
