= Rodrigo Celeste =

Brazilian footballer

Personal information
- Date of birth: 30 June 1990 (age 36)
- Place of birth: São José dos Campos, Brazil
- Height: 1.83 m (6 ft 0 in)
- Position: Midfielder

Team information
- Current team: Ituano

Youth career
- 2008–2009: Primeira Camisa

Senior career*
Years	Team	Apps	(Gls)
2009–2011	Primeira Camisa	0	(0)
2012–2013	Rio Branco	0	(0)
2013	Treze	14	(2)
2014	Rio Claro	0	(0)
2014	Paraná	2	(0)
2015	Treze	0	(0)
2015–	Rio Claro	0	(0)
2015–	Ituano	2	(0)
- * Club domestic league appearances and goals as of 12 January 2017

Rodrigo Celeste (born 30 June 1990) is a Brazilian footballer who plays for Ituano as a midfielder.

== Personal life ==
Rodrigo's brother Bruno Celeste is also a footballer.

== Career statistics ==
As of 12 January 2017

Club	Season	League			State League		Cup		Continental		Other		Total	
Club	Season	Division	Apps	Goals	Apps	Goals	Apps	Goals	Apps	Goals	Apps	Goals	Apps	Goals
Primeira Camisa	2009	Paulista B	—		5	0	—		—		—		5	0
Primeira Camisa	2010	Paulista B	—		16	3	—		—		—		16	3
Primeira Camisa	2011	Paulista B	—		28	5	—		—		—		28	5
Primeira Camisa	Subtotal		—		49	8	—		—		—		49	8
Rio Branco	2012	Paulista A3	—		22	3	—		—		9 (Note: All appearance(s) in Copa Paulista)	1	31	4
Rio Branco	2013	Paulista A2	—		12	3	—		—		—		12	3
Rio Branco	Subtotal		—		34	6	—		—		9	1	34	6
Treze	2013	Série C	14	2	—		—		—		—		14	2
Rio Claro	2014	Paulista	—		11	0	—		—		—		11	0
Paraná	2014	Série B	2	0	—		0	0	—		—		2	0
Treze	2015	Série D	—		10	4	—		—		—		10	4
Rio Claro	2016	Paulista	—		4	0	—		—		—		4	0
Ituano	2016	Série D	2	0	—		—		—		8	2	10	2
Career total			18	2	108	18	0	0	0	0	17	3	143	23
