= Fabricio Lusa =

Brazilian footballer (born 1992)

Personal information
- Date of birth: 11 March 1992 (age 34)
- Place of birth: Caxias do Sul, Brazil
- Height: 1.75 m (5 ft 9 in)
- Position: Midfielder

Team information
- Current team: Bento Gonçalves

Senior career*
Years	Team	Apps	(Gls)
2011–2015	Juventude	23	(1)
2013	→ Bahia (loan)	18	(0)
2016	Capivariano	0	(0)
2016–2017	Sergipe	4	(0)
2017	Batatais	0	(0)
2017	Linense		
2018	Veranópolis	0	(0)
2018	Itabaiana	5	(0)
2019	Veranópolis	0	(0)
2019	AC Kajaani	4	(0)
2020–	Bento Gonçalves	2	(0)
- * Club domestic league appearances and goals as of 14:28, 27 November 2020 (UTC)

Fabricio Lusa (born 11 March 1992) is a Brazilian footballer who plays for Bento Gonçalves as a midfielder.

== Career statistics ==
As of 11 January 2017

Club	Season	League			State League		Cup		Continental		Other		Total	
Club	Season	Division	Apps	Goals	Apps	Goals	Apps	Goals	Apps	Goals	Apps	Goals	Apps	Goals
Juventude	2011	Série D	5	1	0	0	—		—		—		5	1
Juventude	2012	Série D	5	0	4	0	0	0	—		—		9	0
Juventude	2013	Série D	2	0	17	0	—		—		—		19	0
Juventude	2014	Série C	0	0	0	0	—		—		—		0	0
Juventude	2015	Série C	11	0	0	0	—		—		—		11	0
Juventude	Subtotal		23	1	21	0	0	0	—		—		44	1
Bahia	2013	Série A	18	0	—		—		2	0	—		20	0
Capivariano	2016	Paulista	—		5	0	—		—		—		5	0
Sergipe	2016	Série D	4	0	—		—		—		—		4	0
Career total			45	1	26	0	0	0	2	0	0	0	73	1
