= Vitor Bueno =

Brazilian footballer

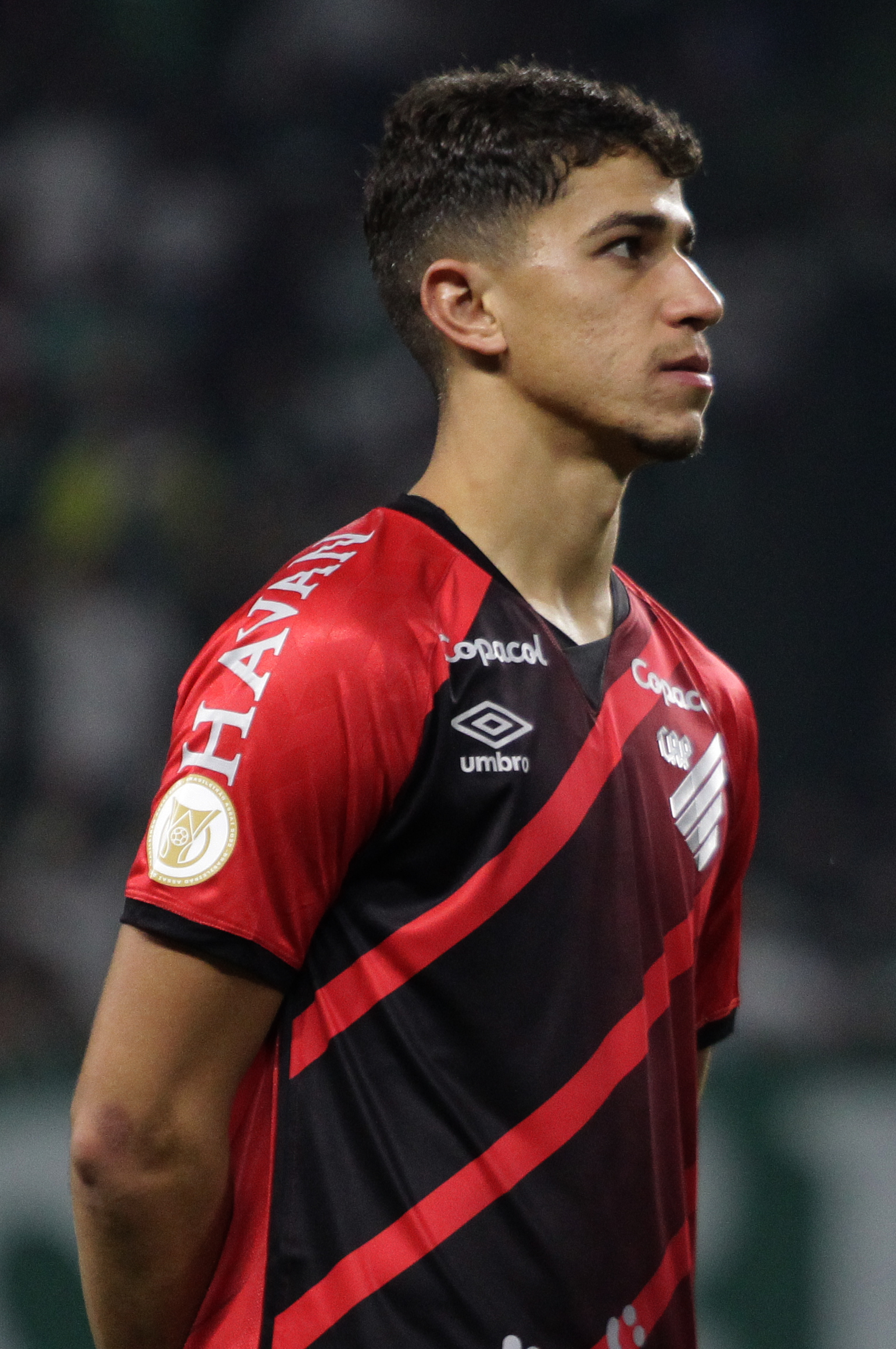
- Vitor Bueno with Athletico Paranaense in 2022

Personal information
- Full name: Vitor Frezarin Bueno
- Date of birth: 5 September 1994 (age 32)
- Place of birth: Monte Alto, Brazil
- Height: 1.83 m (6 ft 0 in)
- Position: Attacking midfielder

Team information
- Current team: Clube do Remo
- Number: 15

Youth career
- 2009–2010: Monte Azul
- 2011–2012: Bahia
- 2013–2014: Botafogo-SP

Senior career*
Years	Team	Apps	(Gls)
2014–2016	Botafogo-SP	11	(2)
2015–2016	→ Santos (loan)	16	(4)
2016–2019	Santos	65	(14)
2018–2019	→ Dynamo Kyiv (loan)	2	(0)
2019	→ São Paulo (loan)	28	(6)
2020–2022	São Paulo	80	(7)
2022–2023	Athletico Paranaense	41	(8)
2024–2025	Cerezo Osaka	38	(6)
2026–	Clube do Remo	11	(2)
- * Club domestic league appearances and goals as of 9 April 2026

Vitor Frezarin Bueno (born 5 September 1994) is a Brazilian professional footballer who plays as an attacking midfielder for Clube do Remo.

== Career ==
=== Botafogo-SP ===
Born in Monte Alto, São Paulo, Bueno started his career at Monte Azul's youth setup before moving to Bahia in 2011. In 2013, he joined Botafogo-SP, initially assigned to the under-20s.

Bueno made his professional debut for the latter on 25 January 2014, coming on as a second-half substitute in a 4–2 home win against Paulista for the Campeonato Paulista championship. On 20 November, after being the club's top goalscorer in the year's Copa Paulista, he extended his contract until 2017.

Bueno scored his first professional goal on 5 April 2015, netting the first in a 2–0 home success over São Paulo.

=== Santos ===
On 26 May 2015 Bueno joined Santos on loan until the end of the year, and was initially assigned to the club's under-23 squad. He made his Série A debut on 17 September 2015, coming on as a late substitute in a 4–0 home routing over Atlético Mineiro. He scored his first goal in the category on 6 December, netting his team's fourth in a 5–1 home routing of Atlético Paranaense.

On 16 April 2016, Bueno scored a brace in a 2–0 Paulistão home win against São Bento, which ensured his side in the semifinals of the tournament. He was also a starter in both finals, being crowned champions after a 2–1 win on aggregate over Audax.

On 18 May 2016, Bueno signed a new contract with Santos, running until 2020. He scored his first league goal of the campaign four days later, netting his team's first in a 2–1 home win against Coritiba through a direct free kick.

Bueno became an undisputed starter for Peixe, scoring goals against Botafogo, Sport and São Paulo in the month of June 2016. He repeated the feat in the following month, netting against Ponte Preta, Vitória and Cruzeiro. In September, Vitor scored goals against Corinthians and Santa Cruz, taking his tally up to ten and becoming the club's top goalscorer in the Brasileirão. He was also elected the tournament's Best Newcomer.

Bueno made his Copa Libertadores debut on 9 March 2017, starting in a 1–1 away draw against Sporting Cristal. On 1 July, he suffered a knee injury in a 1–1 away draw against Atlético Goianiense, being sidelined for eight months.

Bueno returned to action on 14 February 2018, playing the last ten minutes in a 2–0 home win against São Caetano.

==== Dynamo Kyiv (loan) ====
On 2 August 2018, Bueno signed a two-year loan deal with Ukrainian club Dynamo Kyiv, with Derlis González moving in the opposite direction. He only played a total of 80 minutes during his stay, appearing in three matches as a substitute.

=== São Paulo ===
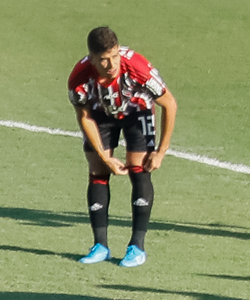
Vitor Bueno with São Paulo in 2019

On 3 April 2019, Bueno agreed to a loan deal with São Paulo, signing until December 2020. On 11 December, after being the club's top goalscorer in the top tier with six goals, he signed a permanent four-year contract with Tricolor.

=== Cerezo Osaka ===
In January 2024, it was announced that Bueno would be signing for J1 League club Cerezo Osaka for the 2024 season.

== Career statistics ==
As of 28 February 2023

Appearances and goals by club, season and competition
Club	Season	League			State League		Cup		Continental		Other		Total	
Club	Season	Division	Apps	Goals	Apps	Goals	Apps	Goals	Apps	Goals	Apps	Goals	Apps	Goals
Botafogo-SP	2014	Paulista	—		7	0	—		—		23 (Note: Appearance(s) in Copa Paulista)	8	30	8
Botafogo-SP	2015	Série D	0	0	4	2	—		—		—		4	2
Botafogo-SP	Total		0	0	11	2	—		—		23	8	34	10
Santos	2015	Série A	4	1	—		0	0	—		—		4	1
Santos	2016	Série A	33	10	11	3	4	0	—		—		48	13
Santos	2017	Série A	8	0	12	4	3	0	6 (Note: Appearance(s) in Copa Libertadores)	3	—		29	7
Santos	2018	Série A	5	0	8	0	2	0	4	0	—		19	0
Santos	Total		50	11	31	7	9	0	10	3	—		100	21
Dynamo Kyiv	2018–19	Ukrainian Premier League	2	0	—		1	0	—		—		3	0
São Paulo	2019	Série A	28	6	—		1	0	—		—		29	6
São Paulo	2020	Série A	31	2	11	1	6	0	7 (Note: Five appearances and one goal in Copa Libertadores, two appearances in Copa Sudamericana)	1	—		55	4
São Paulo	2021	Série A	19	1	9	3	2	0	6 (Note: Appearance(s) in Copa Sudamericana)	2	—		36	6
São Paulo	Total		78	9	20	4	9	0	13	3	—		120	16
Athletico Paranaense	2022	Série A	21	4	—		3	2	7	0	—		31	6
Athletico Paranaense	2023	Série A	0	0	10	2	0	0	0	0	—		10	2
Athletico Paranaense	Total		21	4	10	2	3	2	7	0	—		41	8
Career total			151	24	72	15	22	2	30	6	23	8	298	55

== Honours ==
Santos

- Campeonato Paulista: 2016

São Paulo

- Campeonato Paulista: 2021

Athletico Paranaense

- Campeonato Paranaense: 2023

Individual

- Campeonato Paulista Best goal: 2016
- Campeonato Brasileiro Best Newcomer: 2016
