= David (footballer, born 1990) =

Brazilian footballer

Personal information
- Full name: David Euripedes Marques de Oliveira
- Date of birth: 18 February 1990 (age 36)
- Place of birth: Brasília, Brazil
- Height: 1.77 m (5 ft 10 in)
- Position: Midfielder

Team information
- Current team: Gama

Youth career
- –2008: Brasiliense

Senior career*
Years	Team	Apps	(Gls)
2008–2010	Brasiliense		
2008	→ Samambaia (loan)		
2011	Ceilândia		
2011	Gama		
2012	Sobradinho		
2013	Santa Maria		
2013–2016	Luziânia		
2016–	Gama		
- * Club domestic league appearances and goals as of 16 January 2017

David Euripedes Marques de Oliveira (born February 18, 1990, in Brasília), known as just David, is a Brazilian footballer who plays for Gama as midfielder. He already played for national competitions such as Copa do Brasil and Campeonato Brasileiro Série D.

== Career statistics ==
As of 16 January 2017

Club	Season	League			State League		Cup		Conmebol		Other		Total	
Club	Season	Division	Apps	Goals	Apps	Goals	Apps	Goals	Apps	Goals	Apps	Goals	Apps	Goals
Ceilândia	2011	Brasiliense	—		3	1	1	0	—		—		4	1
Gama	2011	Série D	5	0	—		—		—		—		5	0
Sobradinho	2012	Série D	3	0	7	0	—		—		—		10	0
Luziânia	2013	Brasiliense	—		7	0	2	0	—		—		9	0
Luziânia	2014	Série D	6	0	10	0	—		—		—		16	0
Luziânia	2015	Brasiliense	—		14	0	1	0	—		2 (Note: All appearance(s) in Copa Verde)	0	17	0
Luziânia	2016	Série D	6	0	13	0	—		—		—		19	0
Luziânia	Subtotal		12	0	44	0	3	0	—		2	0	61	0
Gama	2016	Brasiliense	—		—		2	0	—		—		2	0
Career total			20	0	54	1	6	0	0	0	2	0	82	1
