= Cavalo (footballer) =

Brazilian footballer (born 1991)

Personal information
- Full name: Dienison Gomes do Carmo
- Date of birth: 12 October 1991 (age 35)
- Place of birth: Macapá, Brazil
- Position: Right back

Team information
- Current team: Botafogo–DF

Youth career
- 2007: Ypiranga–AP

Senior career*
Years	Team	Apps	(Gls)
2008	Independente–AP		
2009–2010	Santana		
2011–2013	Trem		
2013–2014	Santana		
2014–2016	Santos–AP	9	(0)
2016	Botafogo–DF		
- * Club domestic league appearances and goals as of 19 January 2017

Dienison Gomes do Carmo (born October 12, 1991), known by his nickname Cavalo, is a Brazilian footballer who plays for Botafogo–DF as right back. He already played for national competitions such as Copa do Brasil and Campeonato Brasileiro Série D for Santos–AP.

He have already played in several amapá teams, such as Independente–AP, Trem, Santana and Santos–AP, being winner of Campeonato Amapaense 2011, 2015 and 2016 editions

== Career statistics ==
As of 19 January 2017

Club	Season	League			State League		Cup		Conmebol		Other		Total	
Club	Season	Division	Apps	Goals	Apps	Goals	Apps	Goals	Apps	Goals	Apps	Goals	Apps	Goals
Santos–AP	2014	Série D	9	0	—		—		—		—		9	0
Santos–AP	2015	Série D	0	0	—		0	0	—		0	0	0	0
Santos–AP	2016	Série D	—		—		2	0	—		0	0	2	0
Santos–AP	Subtotal		9	0	—		2	0	—		0	0	11	0
Botafogo–DF	2016	Brasiliense B	—		3	0	—		—		—		3	0
Career total			9	0	3	0	2	0	0	0	0	0	14	0
