= 2013–14 Ukrainian Cup =

Kubok Ukrainy

Tournament details
- Country: Ukraine
- Dates: 24 July 2013 – 15 May 2014; 24 July – 7 August 2013 (preliminary rounds); 25 September 2013 – 15 May 2014 (main event)
- Teams: 51

Final positions
- Champions: Dynamo Kyiv (10th title)
- Runners-up: Shakhtar Donetsk
- Semifinalists: Chornomorets Odesa; Slavutych Cherkasy
- UEFA Europa League: Dynamo Kyiv

Tournament statistics
- Matches played: 48
- Goals scored: 141 (2.94 per match)
- Top goal scorer(s): (Croatia) Eduardo da Silva (Ukraine) Andriy Yarmolenko (4 goals)

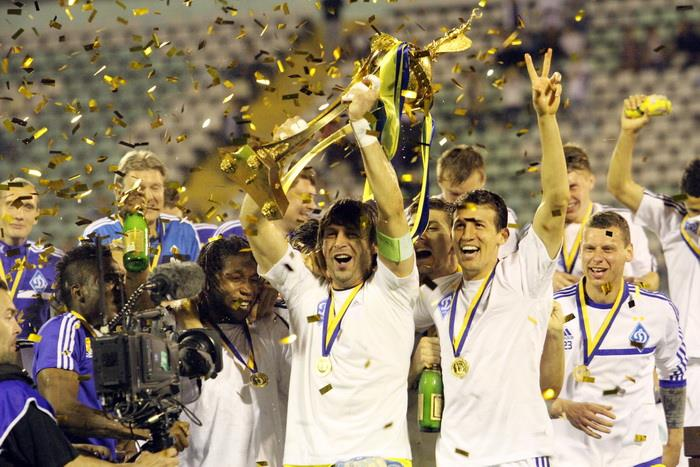
Dynamo players with the cup trophy after the final match

The 2013–14 Ukrainian Cup was the 23rd annual season of Ukraine's football knockout competition.

The decision on a schedule of competitions for clubs of the First and Second League and leagues composition was confirmed on June 20, 2013, at a session of Central Council of the Professional Football League of Ukraine

Shakhtar Donetsk are the defending Ukrainian Cup champions for the last three consecutive seasons. As a member of the Premier League enter the competition in the Round of 32.

== Team allocation ==
Fifty-one teams will enter into the Ukrainian Cup competition.

=== Distribution ===
First qualifying round (6 teams)	4 entrants from the Second League; 2 entrants from the Amateur Cup	
Second qualifying round (32 teams)	15 entrants from the First League; 14 entrants from the Second League	3 winners from the first qualifying round
Tournament proper (32 teams)	16 participants of the Premier League	16 winners from the second qualifying round

=== Round and draw dates ===
All draws held at FFU headquarters (Building of Football) in Kyiv unless stated otherwise.

Phase	Round	Draw date	Game date
Qualifying	First qualifying round	2 July 2013	24 July 2013
Qualifying	Second qualifying round	2 July 2013	7 August 2013
Main event	Round of 32	4 September 2013	25–26 September 2013
Main event	Round of 16	27 September 2013	29–30 October 2013
Main event	Quarter-finals	23 January 2014	26 March 2014
Main event	Semi-finals	2 April 2014	7 May 2014
Main event	Final	15 May 2014 at Butovsky Vorskla Stadium, Poltava	

Source: Competition calendar at the Premier League website

=== Teams ===
Enter in First Round		Enter in Second Round		Enter in Round of 32
AAFU; 2 teams	PFL League 2; 4/19 teams	PFL League 2; 14/19 teams	PFL League 1; 15/16 teams	UPL; 16/16 teams
Nove Zhyttya Andriivka; ODEK Orzhiv	Enerhiya Mykolaiv*; FC Karlivka; Makiyivvuhillya Makiyivka; Obolon-Brovar Kyiv*	Arsenal-Kyivshchyna; Dynamo Khmelnytskyi; Enerhiya Nova Kakhovka; Hirnyk Kryvyi Rih; Hirnyk-Sport; Kremin Kremenchuk; Krystal Kherson; Myr Hornostayivka; Real Pharma Odesa; Shakhtar Sverdlovsk; Skala Stryi; Stal Dniprodzerzhynsk; Slavutych Cherkasy; FC Ternopil	Avanhard Kramatorsk; Bukovyna Chernivtsi; Desna Chernihiv; Helios Kharkiv; MFC Mykolaiv; Naftovyk-Ukrnafta; Nyva Ternopil; FC Oleksandriya; Olimpik Donetsk; FC Poltava; Stal Alchevsk; PFC Sumy; Tytan Armyansk; UkrAhroKom Holovkivka; Zirka Kirovohrad	Arsenal Kyiv; Chornomorets Odesa; Dnipro Dnipropetrovsk; Dynamo Kyiv; Hoverla Uzhhorod; Karpaty Lviv; Illichivets Mariupol; Metalist Kharkiv; Metalurh Donetsk; Metalurh Zaporizhia; PFC Sevastopol; Shakhtar Donetsk; Tavriya Simferopol; Volyn Lutsk; Vorskla Poltava; Zorya Luhansk

Notes:

- With the asterisk (*) are noted the Second League teams that were recently admitted to the league from amateurs and the AAFU (amateur) team(s) that qualified in place of the Amateur Cup finalist(s).
- The last season Poltava-2 Karlivka was reorganized as a separate club FC Karlivka and entered the cup competition.
- Reserve teams Dynamo-2 from the First League and Shakhtar-3 from the Second League were not included in the draw.

== Bracket ==
The following is the tournament bracket that demonstrates the last five rounds of the Ukrainian Cup, including the final match. Numbers in parentheses next to the match score represent the results of a penalty shoot-out.

Round of 32
Dynamo Kyiv	3
Metalurh Donetsk	2
Shakhtar Sverdlovsk	3
Myr Hornostayivka	1
Karpaty Lviv	1
FC Sevastopol	0
PFC Oleksandriya	1
Metalist Kharkiv (a.e.t.)	4
Bukovyna Chernivtsi	0
Dnipro Dnipropetrovsk	2
Enerhiya Mykolaiv	0
Chornomorets Odesa	4
Vorskla Poltava (a.e.t.)	2
Volyn Lutsk	1
FC Ternopil (a.e.t.)	4
FC Poltava	3
Hirnyk Kryvyi Rih	1
Desna Chernihiv (a.e.t.)	2
Stal Dniprodzerzhynsk	1
Metalurh Zaporizhia	2
Illichivets Mariupol	0
Shakhtar Donetsk	3
MFC Mykolaiv (a.e.t.)	2
Zirka Kirovohrad	1
Nyva Ternopil	3
UkrAhroKom Holovkivka	0
Hoverla Uzhhorod	0
Arsenal Kyiv	1
Slavutych Cherkasy	3
Tavriya Simferopol	1
Avanhard Kramatorsk (a.e.t.)	3
Zorya Luhansk	1

Round of 16
Shakhtar Sverdlovsk	0
Dynamo Kyiv	4
Karpaty Lviv	0
Metalist Kharkiv	2
Chornomorets Odesa	+
Dnipro Dnipropetrovsk	-
FC Ternopil (p)	1 (3)
Vorskla Poltava	1 (1)
Desna Chernihiv (p)	1 (5)
Metalurh Zaporizhia	1 (4)
MFC Mykolaiv	0
Shakhtar Donetsk	3
Nyva Ternopil	+
Arsenal Kyiv	-
Slavutych Cherkasy	1
Avanhard Kramatorsk	0

Quarter-finals
Metalist Kharkiv	2
Dynamo Kyiv	3
FC Ternopil	0
Chornomorets Odesa	1
Desna Chernihiv	0
Shakhtar Donetsk	2
Slavutych Cherkasy (p)	1 (4)
Nyva Ternopil	1 (3)

Semi-finals
Dynamo Kyiv	4
Chornomorets Odesa	0
Slavutych Cherkasy	0
Shakhtar Donetsk (a.e.t.)	3

Final
15 May – Poltava
Dynamo Kyiv	2
Shakhtar Donetsk	1

== Competition schedule ==
=== First Preliminary Round (1/64) ===
In this round entered 4 clubs from the 2013–14 Ukrainian Second League and the finalists of the Ukrainian Amateur Cup. The round matches were played on 24 July 2013.

24 July 2013	Nove Zhyttia Andriyivka (AM)	0–1 (a.e.t.)	(2L) Obolon-Brovar Kyiv	Mashivka, (Note: Nove Zhyttia Andriyivka played its home game at Kolos Stadium, Mashivka (Poltava Oblast)) Poltava Oblast
18:00		Report	Pronak 98'	Stadium: Kolos; Attendance: 1,000; Referee: Stanislav Marulin (Nova Kakhovka)

24 July 2013	FC Karlivka (2L)	4–0	(2L) Makiyivvuhillya Makiyivka	Karlivka, Poltava Oblast
18:00	Kovalenko 13'; Dobryanskyi 53'; Fomych 82'; Havras 90+1'	Report	Masyutkin (yellow card) 24' (yellow-red card) 70'	Stadium: Mashynobudivnyk; Attendance: 1,000; Referee: Oleksiy Derevinskyi (Kyiv)

24 July 2013	ODEK Orzhiv (AM)	0–3	(2L) Enerhiya Mykolaiv	Orzhiv, Rivne Oblast
18:00		Report	Hrankovskyi 67'; Ryabtsev 71'; Kostyuk 90+4'	Stadium: ODEK; Attendance: 1,000; Referee: Andriy Nizola (Ivano-Frankivsk)

=== Second Preliminary Round (1/32) ===
In this round 15 clubs from 2013–14 Ukrainian First League (except Dynamo-2 Kyiv) and the higher seeded clubs from the 2013–14 Ukrainian Second League will enter. They will be drawn against the three winners of the First Preliminary Round. The round matches were played on 7 August 2013.

7 August 2013	Shakhtar Sverdlovsk (2L)	4–0	(2L) Krystal Kherson	Rovenky, (Note: Due to the construction of the stadium imeni Horiushkina in Sverdlovsk, match played at Avanhard in Rovenky.) Luhansk Oblast
17:00	Polyanytsia 11'; Korobkin 13'; Lukashov 26', 44'; Holovko (red card) 83'	Report		Stadium: Avanhard; Attendance: 400; Referee: Denys Reznikov (Dniprodzerzhynsk)

7 August 2013	FC Karlivka (2L)	2–4	(2L) Hirnyk Kryvyi Rih	Karlivka, Poltava Oblast
17:00	Spivak 8'; Misyailo 12' (pen.); Kovalenko (penalty missed) 45'	Report	Ilyashov 37'; Pashkovskyi 82'; Buka 85'; Hryhoryk 90+1'	Stadium: Mashynobudivnyk; Attendance: 1,100; Referee: Viktor Kopiyevskyi (Kirovohrad)

7 August 2013	Real Pharma Ovidiopol (2L)	2–3 (a.e.t.)	(2L) Slavutych Cherkasy	Ovidiopol, Odesa Oblast
16:58	Prodan 36'; Andreyev 80' (o.g.)	Report	Chebotaryov 52'; Lobov 56' (o.g.); Ushakov 112'	Stadium: Dnister imeni Dukova; Attendance: 250; Referee: Yaroslav Bits (Lviv)

7 August 2013	Hirnyk-Sport Komsomolsk (2L)	1–2	(2L) Enerhiya Mykolaiv	Komsomolsk, Poltava Oblast
17:00	Dyachuk 79'	Report	Khudobyak 16'; Ryabtsev 77'	Stadium: Yunist; Attendance: 300; Referee: Oleksandr Solovyan (Kyiv)

7 August 2013	UkrAhroKom Holovkivka (1L)	1–0	(1L) Naftovyk-Ukrnafta Okhtyrka	Holovkivka, Kirovohrad Oblast
17:00		Report	Antonyuk 51' (o.g.)	Stadium: HOLovkivskyi; Attendance: 500; Referee: Pavlo Chyzhevskyi (Kyiv)

7 August 2013	Olimpik Donetsk (1L)	1–1 (a.e.t.) (3–5 p)	(1L) PFC Oleksandriya	Donetsk
17:00	Drachenko 113'	Report	Zeynalov 95'; Basov (yellow card) 105+2' (red card) 105+2'	Stadium: Olimpik; Attendance: 300; Referee: Ihor Paskhal (Kherson)
	Penalties
	Lebed (penalty scored); Semenyna (penalty scored); Aleksanov (penalty scored); Hryshko (penalty missed)		(penalty scored) Loboyko; (penalty scored) Mykytsei; (penalty scored) Kolomoyets; (penalty scored) Sukhotskyi; (penalty scored) Zeynalov

7 August 2013	Dynamo Khmelnytskyi (2L)	0–2	(1L) Avanhard Kramatorsk	Khmelnytskyi
17:00	Papirovych 78' (o.g.)	Report	Shvydkyi 75'	Stadium: Podillia; Attendance: 500; Referee: Andriy Yablonskyi (Ternopil)

7 August 2013	Zirka Kirovohrad (1L)	2–1 (a.e.t.)	(1L) Stal Alchevsk	Kirovohrad
17:00	Shavrin 45+1'; Rudnytskyi 105'	Report	Sikorskyi 34'	Stadium: Zirka; Attendance: 1,800; Referee: Dmytro Zhukov (Donetsk)

7 August 2013	FC Sumy (1L)	0–1	(1L) Bukovyna Chernivtsi	Sumy
17:30		Report	Donets 54'	Stadium: Yuvileinyi; Attendance: 4,100; Referee: Vitaliy Dyadenko (Kirovohrad)

7 August 2013	Obolon-Brovar Kyiv (2L)	1–1 (a.e.t.) (1–3 p)	(2L) Myr Hornostayivka	Kyiv
17:30	Favorov 80'	Report	Bilousov 45+3'; Dovbysh (yellow card) 22' (yellow-red card) 58'	Stadium: Obolon Arena; Attendance: 1,800; Referee: Pavlo Pochepetskyi (Druzhkivka)
	Penalties
	Kornyev (penalty scored); Cheremisin (penalty missed); Vovchenko (penalty missed); Leshchenko (penalty missed)		(penalty scored) Shypa; (penalty scored) Savchenko; (penalty scored) Kozhemyakin; (penalty missed) Khomutov

7 August 2013	Arsenal-Kyivshchyna Bila Tserkva (2L)	0–1	(2L) FC Ternopil	Bila Tserkva, Kyiv Oblast
18:00	Kostyuchenko (red card) 43'	Report	Semenets 50'	Stadium: Trudovi Rezervy; Attendance: 1,100; Referee: Dmytro Kononov (Donetsk)

7 August 2013	Kremin Kremenchuk (2L)	0–1	(1L) Nyva Ternopil	Kremenchuk, Poltava Oblast
18:00		Report	Zahynailov 75'	Stadium: Kremin Arena; Attendance: 1,500; Referee: Dmytro Kryvushkin (Kharkiv)

7 August 2013	Stal Dniprodzerzhynsk (2L)	1–0	(1L) Helios Kharkiv	Dniprodzerzhynsk, Dnipropetrovsk Oblast
18:00	Kotlyar 33'	Report		Stadium: Metalurh; Attendance: 1,000; Referee: Roman Bokhnyak (Sevastopol)

7 August 2013	Enerhiya Nova Kakhovka (2L)	1–3	(1L) Desna Chernihiv	Nova Kakhovka, Kherson Oblast
18:00	Tsvyk 90'	Report	Malyuk 4'; Ahapov 72'; Kartushov 90+1'	Stadium: Enerhiya; Attendance: 805; Referee: Vadym Saik (Odesa)

7 August 2013	MFC Mykolaiv (1L)	3–2 (a.e.t.)	(1L) Tytan Armyansk	Mykolaiv
18:00	Ordynskyi 23'; Kucherenko 56'; Holenkov 118'	Report	Halchuk 79'; Kravchenko 90+5'	Stadium: Tsentralnyi Miskyi; Attendance: 6,700; Referee: Dmytro Bondarenko (Odesa)

7 August 2013	Skala Stryi (2L)	0–3	(1L) FC Poltava	Stryi, Lviv Oblast
18:00	Dmytrenko 58'	Report	Antipov 60', 76'	Stadium: Sokil; Attendance: 1,000; Referee: Oleksiy Drachov (Chernihiv)

=== Round of 32 ===
In this round all 16 teams from the 2013–14 Ukrainian Premier League entered the competition. They and the 16 winners from the previous round consisting of nine clubs from the 2013–14 Ukrainian First League and seven clubs from the 2013–14 Ukrainian Second League are drawn in this round. The draw was performed 4 September. The game between Nyva and UkrAhroKom was postponed to the next day due to schedule conflict as two games are scheduled at Ternopil City Stadium (the other being between city teams of Ternopil and Poltava).

25 September 2013	Shakhtar Sverdlovsk (2L)	3–1	(2L) Myr Hornostayivka	Sverdlovsk, Luhansk Oblast
15:00	Tkachov 2'; Sharko 19'; Taranukha 59'	Report	Polyanytsya 14' (o.g.)	Stadium: imeni Horyushkina; Attendance: 320; Referee: Oleksiy Drachov

25 September 2013	Hirnyk Kryvyi Rih (2L)	1–2 (a.e.t.)	(1L) Desna Chernihiv	Kryvyi Rih, Dnipropetrovsk Oblast
15:30	Haranyan 79'	Report	Kartushov 55'; Melnyk 114'	Stadium: Shakhty Zhovtneva; Attendance: 500; Referee: Oleh Penyushyn

25 September 2013	MFC Mykolaiv (1L)	2–1 (a.e.t.)	(1L) Zirka Kirovohrad	Mykolaiv
15:30	Vladov 45+1'; Berko 109'	Report	Sokorenko 28'	Stadium: Tsentralnyi; Attendance: 4,200; Referee: Dmytro Bondarenko

25 September 2013	Stal Dniprodzerzhynsk (2L)	1–2	(PL) Metalurh Zaporizhya	Dniprodzerzhynsk, Dnipropetrovsk Oblast
16:00	Kulish 64'	Report	Platon 23'; Lazarovych 42'	Stadium: Metalurh; Attendance: 1,500; Referee: Ivan Paskhal

25 September 2013	Enerhiya Mykolaiv (2L)	0–4	(PL) Chornomorets Odesa	Pervomaisk, Mykolaiv Oblast
16:00		Report	Bakaj 1'; Didenko 40'; Slinkin 84'; Valeyev 90'	Stadium: Tsentralnyi; Attendance: 3,100; Referee: Yuriy Foshchiy

25 September 2013	Avanhard Kramatorsk (1L)	3–1 (a.e.t.)	(PL) Zorya Luhansk	Kramatorsk, Donetsk Oblast
16:00	Shvydkyi 10'; Malenko 107', 113'	Report	Ljubenović 73' (pen.)	Stadium: Avanhard (Prapor); Attendance: 3,100; Referee: Volodymyr Bondar

25 September 2013	Bukovyna Chernivtsi (1L)	0–2	(PL) Dnipro Dnipropetrovsk	Chernivtsi
16:00		Report	Selezniov 23'; Konoplianka 45'	Stadium: Bukovyna; Attendance: 10,052; Referee: Ivan Bondar

25 September 2013	Hoverla Uzhhorod (PL)	0–1	(PL) Arsenal Kyiv	Uzhhorod
16:00		Report	Adiyiah 77'	Stadium: Avanhard; Attendance: 1,180; Referee: Serhiy Skyrda

25 September 2013	Slavutych Cherkasy (2L)	3–1	(PL) Tavriya Simferopol	Cherkasy
17:00	Poltavets 25'; Zakharevych 55'; Lobov 90'	Report	Kalyuzhnyi 50'	Stadium: Tsentralnyi; Attendance: 4,850; Referee: Mykola Kryvonosov

25 September 2013	FC Ternopil (2L)	4–3 (a.e.t.)	(1L) FC Poltava	Ternopil
17:00	Kurylo 12'; Semenenko 50' (o.g.); Polyanchuk 86'; Pasternak 99'	Report	Nuridinov 4'; Favorov 85'; Shavrin 90+5'	Stadium: Miskyi; Attendance: 2,012; Referee: Andriy Kutakov

25 September 2013	PFC Oleksandriya (1L)	1–4 (a.e.t.)	(PL) Metalist Kharkiv	Oleksandriya, Kirovohrad Oblast
18:00	Zaporozhan 13'	Report	Souza 5', 110'; Homenyuk 93'; Devich 98' (pen.)	Stadium: Nika; Attendance: 4,800; Referee: Oleksandr Bilokur

25 September 2013	Vorskla Poltava (PL)	2–1 (a.e.t.)	(PL) Volyn Lutsk	Poltava
18:30	Dedechko 62', 114'	Report	Schumacher 16'	Stadium: Vorskla imeni Butovskoho; Attendance: 2,300; Referee: Yuriy Moseichuk

25 September 2013	Dynamo Kyiv (PL)	3–2	(PL) Metalurh Donetsk	Kyiv
19:00	Husyev 25' (pen.); Yarmolenko 57', 63'	Report	Moroziuk 47'; Bolbat 64'	Stadium: NSC Olimpiyskyi; Attendance: 15,587; Referee: Andriy Lisakovsky

25 September 2013	Illichivets Mariupol (PL)	0–3	(PL) Shakhtar Donetsk	Mariupol, Donetsk Oblast
20:30		Report	Ilsinho 52'; Eduardo 83'; Adriano 88'	Stadium: Illichivets; Attendance: 5,700; Referee: Vitaliy Dyadenko

25 September 2013	Karpaty Lviv (PL)	1–0	(PL) FC Sevastopol	Lviv
21:00	Ella 15'	Report		Stadium: Ukraina; Attendance: 14,200; Referee: Serhiy Lysenchuk

26 September 2013	Nyva Ternopil (1L)	3–0	(1L) UkrAhroKom Holovkivka	Ternopil
19:00	Melnyk 5', 30' (pen.); Kikot 46'	Report		Stadium: Miskyi; Attendance: 2,500; Referee: Volodymyr Novokhatniy

=== Round of 16 ===
In this round were drawn the 16 winners from the previous round consisting of 9 teams from the Premier League, four clubs from the 2013–14 Ukrainian First League and three clubs from the 2013–14 Ukrainian Second League. The draw took place on September 27, 2013. The match between Nyva and Arsenal Kyiv has been brought forward one day due to schedule conflict as two games are scheduled at Ternopil City Stadium (the other being between city teams of Ternopil and Vorskla).

29 October 2013	MFC Mykolaiv (1L)	0–3	(PL) Shakhtar Donetsk	Mykolaiv
14:00		Report	Fernando 38'; Adriano 58'; Eduardo 66'	Stadium: Tsentralnyi; Attendance: 19,500; Referee: Andriy Lisakovskyi

29 October 2013	Nyva Ternopil (1L)	w/o^{(3)}	(PL) Arsenal Kyiv	Ternopil
18:00				Stadium: Miskyi

30 October 2013	Shakhtar Sverdlovsk (2L)	0–4	(PL) Dynamo Kyiv	Sverdlovsk, Luhansk Oblast
14:00		Report	Dudu 53'; Husyev 74'; Ideye 87'; Haruna 90+3'	Stadium: imeni Horyushkina; Attendance: 8,000; Referee: Serhiy Skyrda

30 October 2013	Desna Chernihiv (1L)	1–1 (a.e.t.) (5–4 p)	(PL) Metalurh Zaporizhya	Chernihiv
17:00	Machulenko 92'	Report	Shturko 108'	Stadium: imeni Haharina; Attendance: 5,250; Referee: Andriy Yabolonskyi
	Penalties
	Kavatsiv (penalty scored); Chulanov (penalty scored); Chepurnenko (penalty scored); Kartushov (penalty scored); Kondratyuk (penalty scored)		Junior (penalty scored); Teikeu (penalty missed); Maksymov (penalty scored); Shturko (penalty scored); Matyazh (penalty scored)

30 October 2013	Slavutych Cherkasy (2L)	1–0	(1L) Avanhard Kramatorsk	Cherkasy
18:00	Sangare 90+2' (o.g.)	Report		Stadium: Tsentralnyi; Attendance: 6,700; Referee: Mykola Balakin

30 October 2013	FC Ternopil (2L)	1–1 (a.e.t.) (3–1 p)	(PL) Vorskla Poltava	Ternopil
18:30	Bohdanov 11'	Report	Jahović 53'	Stadium: Miskyi; Attendance: 13,500; Referee: Vitaliy Dyadenko
	Penalties
	Bohdanov (penalty scored); Kurilo (penalty scored); Kondzolka (penalty scored)		Dedechko (penalty scored); Sapay (penalty missed); Rebenok (penalty missed); Jahović (penalty missed)

30 October 2013	Chornomorets Odesa (PL)	w/o^{(4)}	(PL) Dnipro Dnipropetrovsk	Odesa
19:45				Stadium: Chornomorets Stadium

30 October 2013	Karpaty Lviv (PL)	0–2	(PL) Metalist Kharkiv	Lviv
20:00		Report	Gómez 22'; Moledo 43'	Stadium: Ukraina; Attendance: 18,500; Referee: Serhiy Boyko

Notes:

^(3) Match was not played. Arsenal Kyiv informed the Ukrainian Premier League that the club would not arrive for the scheduled cup game against Nyva Ternopil because of Arsenal's financial situation. Nyva advance to the next round of the competition.

^(4) Match was not played. Dnipro Dnipropetrovsk did not arrive for the match as the plane with the team was not able to land due to fog forcing airport closures. Control Disciplinary Committee of the Football Federation of Ukraine deny Dnipro's request to play the match at a later date and are expelled from the Cup competition. Chornomorets advance to the next round of the competition. (21 November 2013)

=== Quarterfinals ===
In this round entered the eight winners from the previous round consisting of four teams from the Premier League, two clubs from the Persha Liha, and two clubs from the Druha Liha will be drawn in this round. The draw was made on 23 January 2014.

26 March 2014	Desna Chernihiv (1L)	0–2	(PL) Shakhtar Donetsk	Chernihiv
14:00		Report	Kobin 48'; Eduardo 50'	Stadium: imeni Haharina; Attendance: 14,150; Referee: Serhiy Skrypak

26 March 2014	Slavutych Cherkasy (2L)	1–1 (a.e.t.) (4–3 p)	(1L) Nyva Ternopil	Cherkasy
18:00	Tarasenko 10'	Report	Semenyuk 90+4'	Stadium: Tsentralnyi; Attendance: 10,300; Referee: Yaroslav Kozyk
	Penalties
	Tarasenko (penalty scored); Batalskyi (penalty scored); Lobov (penalty scored); Chebotaryov (penalty scored); Honshchyk (penalty missed)		Yavorskyi (penalty scored); Hrinchenko (penalty scored); Malysh (penalty scored); Semenyuk (penalty missed); Melnyk (penalty missed)

26 March 2014	FC Ternopil (2L)	0–1	(PL) Chornomorets Odesa	Ternopil
19:00		Report	Didenko 90+4'	Stadium: Miskyi; Attendance: 12,000; Referee: Oleksandr Bilokur

26 March 2014	Metalist Kharkiv (PL)	2–3	(PL) Dynamo Kyiv	Kharkiv
20:00	Blanco 19'; Yussuf 85'	Report	Ideye 7', 43'; Yarmolenko 73'	Stadium: Metalist; Attendance: 22,480; Referee: Yuriy Vaks (Simferopol)

=== Semifinals ===
In this round entered the four winners from the previous round consisting of three teams from the Premier League and one club from the Druha Liha will be drawn in this round. By qualifying for the semifinals Slavutych Cherkasy became the first team from the Druha Liha to ever reach this far in the Ukrainian Cup competition. The draw took place 2 April 2014.

7 May 2014	Slavutych Cherkasy (2L)	0–3 (a.e.t.)	(PL) Shakhtar Donetsk	Cherkasy
16:00		Report	Eduardo 105'; Taison 110'; Bernard 120'	Stadium: Tsentralnyi; Attendance: 10,300; Referee: Vitaliy Romanov (Dnipropetrovsk)

7 May 2014	Dynamo Kyiv (PL)	4–0	(PL) Chornomorets Odesa	Kyiv
19:00	Harmash 26', 40'; Yarmolenko 52' (pen.); Mbokani 67'	Report		Stadium: NSC Olimpiyskiy; Attendance: 23,380; Referee: Anatoliy Abdula (Kharkiv)

=== Final ===
The final was originally to be played at Metalist Stadium, Kharkiv but was moved to Butovsky Vorskla Stadium in Poltava.

15 May 2014	Dynamo Kyiv (PL)	2–1	Shakhtar Donetsk (PL)	Vorskla imeni Butovskoho, Poltava
20:00	Kucher 40' (o.g.); Vida 43'	Report	Douglas Costa 57'	Attendance: 9,700; Referee: Yuriy Mozharovskyi (Lviv)

=== Top goalscorers ===
The competition's top ten goalscorers including qualification rounds.

As of May 7, 2014

Rank	Scorer	Team	Goals (Pen.)
1	(Croatia) Eduardo da Silva	Shakhtar Donetsk	4
1	(Ukraine) Andriy Yarmolenko	Dynamo Kyiv	4
3	(Nigeria) Brown Ideye	Dynamo Kyiv	3
4	12 players		2

Over 80 players scored once for their respective teams. Six more players scored against their respective teams.

== See also ==
- 2013–14 Ukrainian Premier League
- 2013–14 Ukrainian First League
- 2013–14 Ukrainian Second League
- 2013–14 UEFA Europa League
