= 2013–14 FC Dynamo Kyiv season =

Dynamo Kyiv
2013–14 season
- Chairman: Ihor Surkis
- Manager: Oleh Blokhin until 17 April 2014; Serhii Rebrov (caretaker) (from 17 April 2014)
- Stadium: Olimpiysky National Sports Complex
- Ukrainian Premier League: 4th
- Ukrainian Cup: Winners
- UEFA Europa League: Round of 32
- Top goalscorer: League: Dieumerci Mbokani (13); All: Andriy Yarmolenko (20)
- Highest home attendance: 29,547 vs Volyn; 14 July 2013
- Lowest home attendance: 28,314 vs Sevastopol; 28 July 2013
- Average home league attendance: 28,931
Home colours	Away colours	Third colours

The 2013–14 season was Dynamo Kyiv's 23rd Ukrainian Premier League season and their second season under manager Oleh Blokhin, who was replaced by Serhii Rebrov in April 2014. Dynamo Kyiv finished 4th in the Ukrainian Premier League, won the Ukrainian Cup and reached the Round of 32 in the UEFA Europa League.

== Squad ==
Note: Flags indicate national team as defined under FIFA eligibility rules; some limited exceptions apply. Players may hold more than one non-FIFA nationality.

No.	Pos.	Nation	Player
1	GK	UKR	Oleksandr Shovkovskyi (captain)
2	DF	BRA	Danilo Silva
3	DF	UKR	Yevhen Selin
4	MF	POR	Miguel Veloso
5	MF	CRO	Ognjen Vukojević
6	DF	AUT	Aleksandar Dragović
7	FW	NED	Jeremain Lens
9	FW	UKR	Roman Bezus
10	FW	UKR	Andriy Yarmolenko
11	FW	NGR	Brown Ideye
16	MF	UKR	Serhiy Sydorchuk
19	MF	UKR	Denys Harmash
20	MF	UKR	Oleh Husyev (vice-captain)

No.	Pos.	Nation	Player
22	FW	UKR	Artem Kravets
23	GK	UKR	Oleksandr Rybka
24	DF	CRO	Domagoj Vida
25	MF	NGR	Lukman Haruna
27	DF	UKR	Yevhen Makarenko
34	DF	UKR	Yevhen Khacheridi
35	GK	UKR	Maksym Koval
45	MF	UKR	Vladyslav Kalytvyntsev
52	GK	UKR	Heorhiy Bushchan
77	MF	UKR	Andriy Tsurikov
85	FW	COD	Dieumerci Mbokani
90	MF	MAR	Younès Belhanda

=== Out on loan ===
Note: Flags indicate national team as defined under FIFA eligibility rules; some limited exceptions apply. Players may hold more than one non-FIFA nationality.

No.	Pos.	Nation	Player
—	GK	UKR	Denys Boyko (at Dnipro Dnipropetrovsk)
—	DF	MKD	Goran Popov (at West Bromwich Albion)
—	DF	UKR	Serhiy Lyulka (at Hoverla Uzhhorod)
—	DF	FRA	Benoît Trémoulinas (at Saint-Étienne)
—	MF	UKR	Vitaliy Buyalskyi (at Hoverla Uzhhorod)
—	MF	BRA	Dudu (at Grêmio)

No.	Pos.	Nation	Player
—	MF	CRO	Niko Kranjčar (at Queens Park Rangers)
—	MF	UKR	Serhiy Rybalka (at Slovan Liberec)
—	MF	UKR	Oleksandr Vasylyev (at Dnipro Dnipropetrovsk)
—	FW	ARG	Marco Ruben (at Evian)
—	FW	COL	Andrés Escobar (at Dallas)
—	FW	SUI	Admir Mehmedi (at Freiburg)

=== Retired number(s) ===
12 – (Ukraine) Club Supporters (the 12th Man)

== Transfers ==
=== Summer ===
In: Note: Flags indicate national team as defined under FIFA eligibility rules; some limited exceptions apply. Players may hold more than one non-FIFA nationality.

No.	Pos.	Nation	Player
5	MF	CRO	Ognjen Vukojević (loan return from (Russia) Spartak Moscow)
6	DF	AUT	Aleksandar Dragović (from (Switzerland) Basel)
7	FW	NED	Jeremain Lens (from (Netherlands) PSV Eindhoven)
33	DF	FRA	Benoît Trémoulinas (from (France) Girondins de Bordeaux)
85	FW	COD	Dieumerci Mbokani (from (Belgium) Anderlecht)
90	MF	MAR	Younès Belhanda (from (France) Montpellier)

Out: Note: Flags indicate national team as defined under FIFA eligibility rules; some limited exceptions apply. Players may hold more than one non-FIFA nationality.

No.	Pos.	Nation	Player
13	MF	SUI	Admir Mehmedi (loan to (Germany) Freiburg)
15	FW	ARG	Marco Ruben (loan to (France) Evian)
21	MF	CRO	Niko Kranjčar (loan to (England) Queens Park Rangers)
22	FW	UKR	Artem Kravets (loan to (Ukraine) Arsenal Kyiv)
26	DF	UKR	Serhiy Lyulka (loan to (Ukraine) Hoverla Uzhhorod)
33	DF	NGR	Taye Taiwo (loan return to (Italy) Milan)
45	MF	UKR	Vladyslav Kalytvyntsev (loan to (Czech Republic) Slovan Liberec)
70	FW	ESP	Lucas (loan return to (Ukraine) Karpaty Lviv)
71	GK	UKR	Denys Boyko (loan to (Ukraine) Dnipro Dnipropetrovsk)
—	DF	MKD	Goran Popov (loan to (England) West Bromwich Albion)
—	MF	UKR	Serhiy Rybalka (loan to (Czech Republic) Slovan Liberec)
—	MF	UKR	Vitaliy Buyalskyi (loan to (Ukraine) Hoverla Uzhhorod)
—	MF	UKR	Kyrylo Petrov (to (Ukraine) Arsenal Kyiv)
—	FW	COL	Andrés Escobar (loan to (France) Evian TG)
—	FW	UKR	Artem Milevskyi (to (Turkey) Gaziantepspor)

=== Winter ===
In: Note: Flags indicate national team as defined under FIFA eligibility rules; some limited exceptions apply. Players may hold more than one non-FIFA nationality.

No.	Pos.	Nation	Player
22	FW	UKR	Artem Kravets (loan return from to (Ukraine) Arsenal Kyiv)
23	GK	UKR	Oleksandr Rybka
45	MF	UKR	Vladyslav Kalytvyntsev (loan return from to (Czech Republic) Slovan Liberec)

Out: Note: Flags indicate national team as defined under FIFA eligibility rules; some limited exceptions apply. Players may hold more than one non-FIFA nationality.

No.	Pos.	Nation	Player
8	MF	UKR	Oleksandr Aliyev (to (Russia) Anzhi Makhachkala)
33	DF	FRA	Benoît Trémoulinas (loan to (France) Saint-Étienne)
99	MF	BRA	Dudu (loan to (Brazil) Grêmio)
—	FW	COL	Andrés Escobar (loan to (United States) Dallas, previously on loan to (France) Evian TG)

== Friendlies ==
20 June 2013	Dynamo Kyiv (Ukraine)	1 – 0	(Georgia (country)) Dinamo Tbilisi	Austria
19:00 EET (UTC+3)	Kravets 7'	Report		Stadium: Aksams, Ruifah-Stadium; Attendance: 135

23 June 2013	Dynamo Kyiv (Ukraine)	1 – 1	(Germany) 1860 München	Germany
18:00 EET (UTC+3)	Friend 19' (o.g.)	Report	Stahl 11'	Stadium: Garmisch-Partenkirchen, Stadion am Gröben; Attendance: 1,200

9 July 2013	Dynamo Kyiv (Ukraine)	1 – 2	(Iran) Esteghlal	Ukraine
19:00 EET (UTC+3)	Ruben 18'	Report	Borhani 13'; Majidi 69'	Stadium: Dynamo Stadium; Attendance: 1,200; Referee: Serhiy Dankovskyi

=== United Tournament ===
==== Standings ====
Pos	Team	Pld	W	D	L	GF	GA	GD	Pts
1	(Ukraine) Dynamo Kyiv	4	3	1	0	8	5	+3	10
2	(Russia) Spartak Moscow	4	1	1	2	3	3	0	4
3	(Russia) Zenit St. Petersburg	4	1	1	2	5	6	−1	4
4	(Ukraine) Shakhtar Donetsk	4	1	1	2	1	3	−2	4

==== Matches ====
27 June 2013	Spartak Moscow (Russia)	0 – 1	(Ukraine) Dynamo Kyiv	Moscow, Russia
18:30 EET (UTC+3)		Report1; Report2	Husyev 31' (pen.)	Stadium: Eduard Streltsov Stadium; Attendance: 8,000; Referee: Alexei Nikolaev, Russia

30 June 2013	Zenit St. Petersburg (Russia)	1 – 2	(Ukraine) Dynamo Kyiv	Kyiv, Ukraine
21:00 EET (UTC+3)	Fayzulin 20'	Report	Harmash 11'; Mehmedi 82'	Stadium: NSC Olimpiyskiy; Attendance: 28,300; Referee: Evgen Aranovsky

3 July 2013	Dynamo Kyiv (Ukraine)	3 – 3	(Russia) Zenit St. Petersburg	Kyiv, Ukraine
20:30 EET (UTC+3)	Harmash 8'; Dudu 58'; Neto 90' (o.g.)	Report	Danny 40'; Kerzhakov 76'; Đorđević 84'	Stadium: NSC Olimpiyskiy; Attendance: 30,219; Referee: Yuri Mozharovsky

7 July 2013	Dynamo Kyiv (Ukraine)	2 – 1	(Russia) Spartak Moscow	Kyiv, Ukraine
20:30 EET (UTC+3)	Lens 15'; Husyev 61'	Report	Insaurralde 90+2'	Stadium: NSC Olimpiyskiy; Attendance: 51,300; Referee: Yuri Vaks

== Competitions ==
=== Ukrainian Premier League ===
==== Results summary ====
Overall								Home						Away					
Pld	W	D	L	GF	GA	GD	Pts	W	D	L	GF	GA	GD	W	D	L	GF	GA	GD
30	18	5	7	60	33	+27	59	11	2	2	37	11	+26	7	3	5	23	22	+1

==== Results by round ====
Round	1	2	3	4	5	6	7	8	9	10	11	12	13	14	15	16	17	18	19	20	21	22	23	24	25	26	27	28	29	30
Ground	H	A	H	A	H	H	A	H	A	H	A	H	A	H	A	A	H	A	H	A	A	H	A	H	A	H	A	H	A	H
Result	D	W	W	L	L	W	W	D	L	W	D	W	W	W	L	W	W	W	L	D	W	W	L	W	D	W	L	W	W	W
Position	9	6	4	6	6	6	6	6	6	5	5	5	5	5	5	5	5	2	3	4	3	3	3	3	3	3	4	4	4	4

Source: Soccerway
A = Away; H = Home; W = Win; D = Draw; L = Loss

==== Results ====
14 July 2013 1	Dynamo Kyiv	1 – 1	Volyn Lutsk	Kyiv
19:30 EEST (UTC+3)	Vida (yellow card) 9'; Mbokani 28'; Khacheridi (yellow card) 76'	Summary	Kinash 2'; Memeshev (yellow card) 3' (yellow-red card) 90+1'; Šikov (yellow card) 32'; Shershun (yellow card) 56'; Pryndeta (yellow card) 81'	Stadium: NSC Olimpiyskiy; Attendance: 29,547; Referee: Oleksandr Ivanov

20 July 2013 2	Hoverla Uzhhorod	1 – 2	Dynamo Kyiv	Uzhhorod
19:00 EEST (UTC+3)	Balashov 87' (pen.); Lyulka (yellow card) 90+1'	Summary	Mbokani 39', 41'; Harmash (yellow card) 79'; Selin (yellow card) 86'; Khacheridi (yellow card) 87'	Stadium: Avanhard Stadium; Attendance: 10,200; Referee: Anatoliy Zhabchenko

28 July 2013 3	Dynamo Kyiv	2 – 0	Sevastopol	Kyiv
19:30 EEST (UTC+3)	Haruna 14'; Mbokani 50'	Summary	Farley Rosa (yellow card) 69'; Karnoza (yellow card) 74'	Stadium: NSC Olimpiyskiy; Attendance: 28,314; Referee: Oleksandr Derdo

4 August 2013 4	Shakhtar Donetsk	3 – 1	Dynamo Kyiv	Donetsk
19:00 EEST (UTC+3)	Srna 2'; Kucher (yellow card) 34'; Eduardo 53'; Luiz Adriano (yellow card) 59'; Teixeira 84'	Summary	Belhanda 8'; Haruna (yellow card) 45+1'; Yarmolenko (yellow card) 56'; Khacheridi (yellow card) 59'; Mbokani (yellow card) 75'	Stadium: Donbas Arena; Attendance: 52,667; Referee: Viktor Shvetsov

11 August 2013 5	Dynamo Kyiv	1 – 2	Chornomorets Odesa	Kyiv
19:30 EEST (UTC+3)	Dragović (yellow card) 43'; Sydorchuk 55'; Husyev (yellow card) 76'	Summary	Pryyomov (yellow card) 39' (goal) 42'; Gai (yellow card) 56'; Fontanello 87'; Antonov (yellow card) 90+2'	Stadium: NSC Olimpiyskiy; Attendance: 29,174; Referee: Yuri Mozharovskiy

18 August 2013 6	Dynamo Kyiv	2 – 0	Tavriya Simferopol	Kyiv
19:30 EEST (UTC+3)	Vukojević (yellow card) 10'; Vida (yellow card) 36'; Bezus 50'; Yarmolenko 74'	Summary	Prychynenko (yellow card) 29'; Kahriman (yellow card) 43'; Rubén Marcelo Gómez (yellow card) 45+1'	Stadium: NSC Olimpiyskiy; Attendance: 21,322; Referee: Vitaliy Romanov

25 August 2013 7	Metalurh Zaporizhya	1 – 2	Dynamo Kyiv	Zaporizhya
19:00 EEST (UTC+3)	Shturko 68'; Matheus (yellow card) 77' (yellow-red card)	Summary	Mbokani 12'; Haruna (yellow card) 42'; Lens (yellow card) 65'; Yarmolenko 67'; Dragović (yellow card) 70'; Husyev (yellow card) 90+5'	Stadium: Slavutych-Arena; Attendance: 12,000; Referee: Yaroslav Kozyk

1 September 2013 8	Dynamo Kyiv	1 – 1	Dnipro Dnipropetrovsk	Kyiv
19:30 EEST (UTC+3)	Trémoulinas (yellow card) 21'; Yarmolenko 64'; Haruna (yellow card) 77'	Summary	Zozulya 22'; Cheberyachko (yellow card) 44'; Seleznyov (yellow card) 51'; Kankava (yellow card) 54'; Boyko (yellow card) 82'	Stadium: NSC Olimpiyskiy; Attendance: 51,378; Referee: Anatoliy Abdula

15 September 2013 9	Metalist Kharkiv	3 – 0	Dynamo Kyiv	Kharkiv
19:30 EEST (UTC+3)	Cleiton Xavier 43'; Devic (yellow card) 44'; Sosa 90+2'; Marlos 90+5'	Summary	Bezus (yellow card) 43'; Haruna (yellow card) 90'; Koval (yellow card) 90+3'	Stadium: OSC Metalist; Attendance: 39,853; Referee: Yury Vaks

21 September 2013 10	Dynamo Kyiv	1 – 0	Karpaty Lviv	Kyiv
18:30 EEST (UTC+3)	Yarmolenko (yellow card) 43'; Ideye 84'	summary	Martynyuk (yellow card) 44'; Plastun (yellow card) 79'; Bartulović (yellow card) 90'	Stadium: NSC Olimpiyskiy; Attendance: 19,843; Referee: Yury Vaks

29 September 2013 11	Vorskla Poltava	2 – 2	Dynamo Kyiv	Poltava
18:00 EEST (UTC+3)	Kurylov (yellow card) 19'; Jahović 33'; Hromov 45' (pen.); Markoski (yellow card) 56'; Sapay (yellow card) 77' sklyar (yellow card) 85'	Summary	Makarenko (yellow card) 16'; Khacheridi (yellow card) 35'; Belhanda 40'; Ideye (red card) 50'; Vukojević (yellow card) 56'; Dragović (yellow card) 79'; Haruna 90+1'	Stadium: Vorskla Stadium; Attendance: 12,500; Referee: Vitaliy Godulyan

6 October 2013 12	Dynamo Kyiv	9 – 1	Metalurh Donetsk	Kyiv
16:00 EEST (UTC+3)	Husyev (yellow card) 13'; Sydorchuk (yellow card) 13'; Yarmolenko 21', 64'; Lens 27', 62'; Belhanda 48', 71', 74'; Haruna 67'; Mbokani 89'	Summary	Holaydo (red card) 19'; Baranovskyi (yellow card) 28'; Lazić 40'; Pryima (yellow card) 75'; Nelson (yellow card) 81'	Stadium: NSC Olimpiyskiy; Attendance: 14,935; Referee: Olexander Derdo

20 October 2013 13	Arsenal Kyiv	Annulled	Dynamo Kyiv	Kyiv
16:00 EEST (UTC+3)	Herasymyuk (yellow card) 59'	Summary	Lens 17'; Yarmolenko 30'; Sydorchuk (yellow card) 50'; Haruna (yellow card) 90+3'	Stadium: Dynamo Stadium; Attendance: 10,841; Referee: Yuri Mozharovskiy

27 October 2013 14	Dynamo Kyiv	1 – 0	Illichivets	Kyiv
17:00 EET (UTC+2)	Belhanda (yellow card) 57'; Haruna (yellow card) 68'; Yarmolenko (red card) 70'; Husyev 82' (pen.)	Summary	Ischenko (yellow card) 56'; Maicon (yellow card) 62'; Khudzhamov (yellow card) 81'; Yemelyanov (yellow card) 85'	Stadium: NSC Olimpiyskiy; Attendance: 20,980; Referee: Kostyantin Trukhanov

3 November 2013 15	Zorya Luhansk	2 – 0	Dynamo Kyiv	Luhansk
19:00 EET (UTC+2)	Danilo 9'; Bilyi (yellow card) 24'; Hordiyenko (yellow card) 40'; Boli (yellow card) 52' (goal) 65'; Hrytsay (yellow card) 68'	Summary	Dragović (yellow card) 43'; Belhanda (yellow card) 77'	Stadium: Avanhard Stadium; Attendance: 13,170; Referee: Anatoliy Abdula

10 November 2013 16	Volyn Lutsk	1 – 4	Dynamo Kyiv	Lutsk
19:30 EET (UTC+2)	Nyemchaninov 26'; Shish (yellow card) 43'	Summary	Bezus 22'; Yarmolenko 36', 70'; Ideye 66'	Stadium: Avanhard Stadium; Attendance: 10,000; Referee: Olexander Derdo

24 November 2013 17	Dynamo Kyiv	3 – 0	Hoverla Uzhhorod	Kyiv
17:00 EET (UTC+2)	Mbokani 22'; Lens 29'; Sydorchuk 84'	Summary	Niculae (yellow card) 17'; Le Tallec (yellow card) 67'	Stadium: NSC Olimpiyskiy; Attendance: 17,348; Referee: Oleksandr Golovkov

2 December 2013 18	Sevastopol	1 – 2	Dynamo Kyiv	Sevastopol
18:00 EET (UTC+2)	Duljaj (yellow card) 13'; Karavayev 45+2'; Budkivskiy (yellow card) 61'	Summary	Yarmolenko (yellow card) 14'; Lens 19'; Khacheridi (yellow card) 41'; Sydorchuk (yellow card) 45+1'; Mbokani 70'	Stadium: SC Sevastopol; Attendance: 5,340; Referee: Yuri Mozharovskiy

1 March 2014 19	Dynamo Kyiv	v	Shakhtar Donetsk	Kyiv
		[ Summary]		Stadium: NSC Olimpiyskiy

8 March 2014 20	Chornomorets Odesa	v	Dynamo Kyiv	Odesa
		[ Summary]		Stadium: Chornomorets Stadium

15 March 2014 21	Tavriya Simferopol	1 – 2	Dynamo Kyiv	Kyiv
19:30 EET (UTC+2)	Burdujan 90+1'	Summary	Belhanda (yellow card) 29'; Mbokani 38'; Yarmolenko 50'	Stadium: NSC Olimpiyskiy; Attendance: 11,535; Referee: Oleksandr Derdo

22 March 2014 22	Dynamo Kyiv	4 – 0	Metalurh Zaporizhya	Kyiv
19:30 EET (UTC+2)	Mbokani 45', 89'; Haruna (yellow card) 72'; Husyev 76', 87'	Summary	Serginho (yellow card) 33'; Balić (yellow card) 35'; Yusov (yellow card) 58'	Stadium: NSC Olimpiyskiy; Attendance: 14,710; Referee: Yuriy Moseychuk

30 March 2014 23	Dnipro Dnipropetrovsk	2 – 0	Dynamo Kyiv	Dnipropetrovsk
17:00 EEST (UTC+3)	Matheus 45+2', 58'; Strinić (yellow card) 72'; Zozulya (yellow card) 89'; Boyko (yellow card) 90+1'	Summary	Harmash (yellow card) 28'; Silva (yellow card) 66'	Stadium: Dnipro Arena; Attendance: 27,160; Referee: Yuri Mozharovskiy

6 April 2014 24	Dynamo Kyiv	4 – 2	Metalist	Kyiv
19:30 EEST (UTC+3)	Harmash 9' (yellow card) 45+1'; Belhanda (yellow card) 13' (goal) 40'; Vukojević (yellow card) 31' (yellow-red card) 90+2'; Makarenko (yellow card) 68'; Yarmolenko 80' (pen.); Mbokani 87'	Summary	Blanco (yellow card) 19'; Edmar 26'; Márcio Azevedo (yellow card) 28'; Gómez (yellow card) 60'; Homenyuk 66'; Yussuf (yellow card) 79'; Gueye (yellow card) 90+3'	Stadium: NSC Olimpiyskiy; Attendance: 39,236; Referee: Victor Shvetsov

12 April 2014 25	Karpaty Lviv	2 – 2	Dynamo Kyiv	Lviv
17:00 EEST (UTC+3)	Fedorchuk 48'; Bartulović (yellow card) 61'; Hladkyy 77'; Holodyuk (yellow card) 87'	Summary	Mbokani (yellow card) 10' (goal) 59'; Veloso 33'; Vida (yellow card) 90'	Stadium: Ukraina Stadium; Attendance: 18,800; Referee: Anatoliy Zhabchenko

16 April 2014 19	Dynamo Kyiv	0 – 2	Shakhtar Donetsk	Kyiv
20:00 EEST (UTC+3)	Vukojević (yellow card) 14'; Silva (yellow card) 45+1'; Belhanda (yellow card) 60'; Makarenko (yellow card) 75'	Summary	Luiz Adriano 10', 33'; Rakytskiy (yellow card) 20'; Ilsinho (yellow card) 28'; Kucher (yellow card) 60'	Stadium: NSC Olimpiyskiy; Attendance: 59,360; Referee: Anatoliy Abdula

20 April 2014 26	Dynamo Kyiv	2 – 1	Vorskla	Kyiv
17:00 EEST (UTC+3)	Ideye 83'; Yarmolenko 85'; Mbokani (yellow card) 90'	Summary	Jahović (yellow card) 16' (goal) 30'; Dedechko (yellow card) 57' (yellow-red card); Dallku (yellow card) 90'	Stadium: NSC Olimpiyskiy; Attendance: 12,140; Referee: Kostyantin Trukhanov

24 April 2014 20	Chornomorets	1 – 1	Dynamo Kyiv	Odesa
19:30 EEST (UTC+3)	Antonov 18'; Kovalchuk (yellow card) 22'; Okriashvili (yellow card) 60'; Léo Matos (yellow card) 72'	Summary	Makarenko (yellow card) 37' (goal) 89'; Belhanda (yellow card) 60'; Dragović (yellow card) 69'; Yarmolenko (yellow card) 72'; Mbokani (yellow card) 79'; Silva (yellow card) 90+3'	Stadium: Chornomorets Stadium; Attendance: 26,542; Referee: Yuriy Moseychuk

27 April 2014 27	Metalurh Donetsk	2 – 1	Dynamo Kyiv	Donetsk
19:30 EEST (UTC+3)	V.Pryyma (yellow card) 20'; Morozyuk (yellow card) 43'; Moraes 46', 85'; Alexandre (yellow card) 83'	Summary	Haruna (yellow card) 56'; Sydorchuk (yellow card) 57'; Dragović (yellow card) 58'; Kalytvyntsev 74'	Stadium: Metalurh Stadium; Attendance: 3,600; Referee: Yury Vaks

3 May 2014 28	Dynamo Kyiv	Cancelled	Arsenal	Kyiv
EEST (UTC+3)		Summary		Stadium: NSC Olimpiyskiy

11 May 2014 29	Illichivets	0 – 2	Dynamo Kyiv	Mariupol
19:30 EEST (UTC+3)	Y.Galchuk (yellow card) 79'; Putivtsev (yellow card) 90+1'	Summary	Vukojević 13' (yellow card) 90+1'; Makarenko (red card) 14'; Kalytvyntsev (yellow card) 20'; Dragović (yellow card) 59'; Ideye 80' (pen.)	Stadium: Illichivets Stadium; Attendance: Anatoliy Zhabchenko

17 May 2014 30	Dynamo Kyiv	3 – 1	Zorya	Kyiv
17:00 EEST (UTC+3)	Ideye 69'; Yarmolenko 71' (pen.); Harmash 73'; Selin (yellow card) 78'	Summary	Vernydub (yellow card) 18'; Yarmash (yellow card) 70'; Danilo 84' (pen.)	Stadium: NSC Olimpiyskiy; Attendance: 15,245; Referee: Yury Vaks

==== League table ====
Pos	Team	Pld	W	D	L	GF	GA	GD	Pts	Qualification or relegation
2	Dnipro Dnipropetrovsk	28	18	5	5	56	28	+28	59	Qualification for the Champions League third qualifying round (Note: On 18 June 2014, UEFA published the seeding ranking for the upcoming 2014-15 UEFA Champions League season, where FC Dnipro Dnipropetrovsk were pending approval of the UEFA Club Financial Control Body (CFCB) on 19 June 2014 to participate in the competition. The main issue that might have impeded Dnipro to participate in the continental competitions was the "Boateng case". The conflict arose during the 2012-13 season when Derek Boateng unsuccessfully tried to leave the club due to breach of contract and was forced to file a case against the club through the Court of Arbitration for Sport (CAS) in Lausanne. The end result was that Dnipro did play in the 2014-15 Champions League 3rd qualifying round (and, subsequently, the Europa League).)
3	Metalist Kharkiv	28	16	9	3	54	29	+25	57	Qualification for the Europa League play-off round
4	Dynamo Kyiv	28	16	5	7	55	33	+22	53	Qualification for the Europa League group stage (Note: FC Dynamo Kyiv qualified for the Group Stage of the 2014-15 Europa League as the 2013-14 Ukrainian Cup winner.)
5	Chornomorets Odesa	28	12	10	6	30	22	+8	46	Qualification for the Europa League third qualifying round
6	Metalurh Donetsk	28	12	7	9	45	42	+3	43	

Source: uafootball.net.ua
Rules for classification: 1st points; 2nd goal difference; 3rd goals scored; 4th head-to-head points; 5th head-to-head goal difference; 6th head-to-head goals scored; 7th fair play rating

=== Ukrainian Cup ===
25 September 2013 Round of 32	Dynamo Kyiv	3 – 2	Metalurh Donetsk	Kyiv
19:00 EEST (UTC+3)	Husyev 25' (pen.); Khacheridi (yellow card) 27'; Yarmolenko 57', 63'; Vida (yellow card) 65'; Sydorchuk (yellow card) 90+3'	Summary	Júnior Moraes (yellow card) 18'; Morozyuk 47'; Daniel (yellow card) 50'; Pryima (yellow card) 51'; Bolbat 64'	Stadium: NSC Olimpiyskiy; Attendance: 15,587; Referee: Andriy Lisakovskyi

30 October 2013 Round of 16	PFC Shakhtar Sverdlovsk	0 – 4	Dynamo Kyiv	Sverdlovsk, Ukraine
14:00 EEST (UTC+3)	Aleksandr Yaskovich (yellow card) 54'	Summary	Trémoulinas (yellow card) 47'; Dudu 52'; Husyev 73'; Haruna (yellow card) 77' (goal) 90+3'; Ideye 87'	Stadium: N.I. Horiushkin Memorial Stadium; Attendance: 8,000; Referee: Sergiy Skyrida

26 March 2014 Quarter Final	Metalist Kharkiv	2 – 3	Dynamo Kyiv	Kharkiv
20:00 EEST (UTC+3)	Blanco 19'; Papa (yellow card) 53'; Edmar (yellow card) 63'; Yussuf 85'; Marlos (yellow card) 90+3'	Summary	Ideye 7', 43' (penalty missed) 79'; Vukojević (yellow card) 35'; Husyev (yellow card) 38'; Vida (yellow card) 53'; Yarmolenko 73'; Lens (yellow card) 90+1'; Bezus (yellow card) 90+3'	Stadium: Metalist Stadium; Attendance: 22,480; Referee: Yuriy Vaks

7 May 2014 Semi Final	Dynamo Kyiv	4 – 0	Chornomorets Odesa	Kyiv
19:00 EEST (UTC+3)	Harmash 26', 40'; Yarmolenko 52' (pen.); Mbokani 67'	Report		Stadium: NSC Olimpiyskiy; Attendance: 23,380; Referee: Anatoliy Abdula

15 May 2014 Final	Dynamo Kyiv	2 – 1	Shakhtar Donetsk	Poltava
20:00 EEST (UTC+3)	Kucher 40' (o.g.); Vida 43'; Mbokani (yellow card) 45+3'; Yarmolenko (yellow card) 70' (yellow-red card) 90+4'; Vukojević (yellow card) 90+1'; Dragović (yellow card) 90+4'	Summary	Rakytskiy (yellow card) 31' (yellow-red card) 90+4'; Srna (yellow card) 45'; Douglas Costa 57'; Luiz Adriano (yellow card) 90+2'; Fred (yellow card) 90+4'	Stadium: Oleksiy Butovskyi Vorskla Stadium; Attendance: 9,700; Referee: Yuri Mozharovskiy

=== Europa League ===
==== Qualifying rounds ====
22 August 2013 Play off round 1st leg	Aktobe (Kazakhstan)	2 – 3	(Ukraine) Dynamo Kyiv	Aktobe, Kazakhstan
16:00 EEST (UTC+3)	Trémoulinas 37' (o.g.); Khairullin 65'; Muldarov (yellow card) 68'; Primus (yellow card) 75'; Logvinenko (yellow card) 79'; Sidelnikov (yellow card) 79'	Report	Yarmolenko 16'; Haruna (yellow card) 33'; Dragović (yellow card) 49'; Brown 52'; Belhanda 57' (yellow card) 79'; Lens (yellow card) 75'	Stadium: Aktobe Central Stadium; Attendance: 12,500; Referee: Aleksei Kulbakov (Belarus)

29 August 2013 Play off round 2nd leg	Dynamo Kyiv (Ukraine)	5 – 1 (8 – 3 agg.)	(Kazakhstan) Aktobe	Kyiv, Ukraine
19:00 EEST (UTC+3)	Lens 9'; Bezus 30'; Mbokani 36'; Dragović (yellow card) 37'; Ideye 52' (pen.); Husyev 73'	Report	Geynrikh 37' (pen.); Muldarov (yellow card) 51'; Badlo (yellow card) 81'	Stadium: Olympic Stadium; Attendance: 70; Referee: Stephan Studer (Switzerland)

==== Group stage ====
Pos	Team	Pld	W	D	L	GF	GA	GD	Pts	Qualification
1	(Belgium) Genk	6	4	2	0	10	5	+5	14	Advance to knockout phase
2	(Ukraine) Dynamo Kyiv	6	3	1	2	11	7	+4	10	Advance to knockout phase
3	(Austria) Rapid Wien	6	1	3	2	8	10	−2	6	
4	(Switzerland) Thun	6	1	0	5	3	10	−7	3	

Source: Soccerway

19 September 2013 1	Dynamo Kyiv (Ukraine)	0 – 1	(Belgium) Genk	Kyiv, Ukraine
22:05 EEST (UTC+3)	Vida (yellow card) 47'	Report	Buffel (yellow card) 61'; Gorius 62'; Camus (yellow card) 90'; Köteles (yellow card) 90+3'	Stadium: Olympic Stadium; Attendance: 30,345; Referee: Anastasios Sidiropoulos (Greece)

3 October 2013 2	Rapid Wien (Austria)	2 – 2	(Ukraine) Dynamo Kyiv	Vienna, Austria
20:00 EEST (UTC+3)	Sonnleitner (yellow card) 40'; Behrendt (yellow card) 43'; Boyd (yellow card) 52'; Burgstaller 53'; Schaub (yellow card) 77'; Trimmel 90+4'	Report	Sydorchuk (yellow card) 4'; Yarmolenko 30'; Dibon 34' (o.g.); Vukojević (yellow card) 84'; Koval (yellow card) 90+1'	Stadium: Ernst-Happel-Stadion; Attendance: 34,800; Referee: Mike Dean (England)

24 October 2013 3	Dynamo Kyiv (Ukraine)	3 – 0	(Switzerland) Thun	Kyiv, Ukraine
20:00 EEST (UTC+3)	Silva (yellow card) 14'; Yarmolenko 35' (yellow card) 40'; Mbokani 60'; Husyev 78'; Lens (yellow card) 83'	Report	Schneuwly (yellow card) 19'; Lüthi (yellow card) 88'	Stadium: Olympic Stadium; Attendance: 26,042; Referee: Halis Özkahya (Turkey)

7 November 2013 4	Thun (Switzerland)	0 – 2	(Ukraine) Dynamo Kyiv	Thun, Switzerland
22:05 EET (UTC+2)	Schneuwly (yellow card) 42'; Zuffi (yellow card) 79'	Report	Mbokani (yellow card) 17' (yellow-red card) 17'; Schenkel 29' (o.g.); Sydorchuk (yellow card) 33'; Dragović (yellow card) 42'; Vukojević (yellow card) 57'; Yarmolenko 69', (yellow card) 90'	Stadium: Arena Thun; Attendance: 6,523; Referee: Clément Turpin (France)

28 November 2013 5	Genk (Belgium)	3 – 1	(Ukraine) Dynamo Kyiv	Genk, Belgium
20:00 EET (UTC+2)	Vossen 17' (pen.); Kumordzi 37', (yellow card) 78'; De Ceulaer 40', (yellow card) 45+1'; Buffel (yellow card) 43'	Report	Yarmolenko 9'; Khacheridi (yellow card) 16'; Sydorchuk (yellow card) 52'; Belhanda (yellow card) 59'	Stadium: Cristal Arena; Attendance: 13,337; Referee: Duarte Gomes (Portugal)

12 December 2013 6	Dynamo Kyiv (Ukraine)	3 – 1	(Austria) Rapid Wien	Kyiv, Ukraine
22:05 EET (UTC+2)	Lens 22'; Husyev 28'; Veloso 70'; Yarmolenko (yellow card) 76'	Report	Boyd 6', (yellow card) 56'; Trimmel (yellow card) 33'	Stadium: Olympic Stadium; Attendance: 18,752; Referee: Björn Kuipers (Netherlands)

==== Knockout phase ====
20 February 2014 Round of 32 1st leg	Dynamo Kyiv (Ukraine)	0 – 2	(Spain) Valencia	Nicosia, Cyprus
20:00 EEST (UTC+3)	Silva (yellow card) 55'	Report	Jonas (yellow card) 77'; Vargas 79'; Feghouli 90+1'	Stadium: GSP Stadium; Attendance: 3,711; Referee: Liran Liany (Israel)

27 February 2014 Round of 32 2nd leg	Valencia (Spain)	0 – 0 (2 – 0 agg.)	(Ukraine) Dynamo Kyiv	Valencia, Spain
22:05 EEST (UTC+3)	Cartabia (yellow card) 29'; Parejo (yellow card) 62'; Pereira (yellow card) 90'	Report	Lens (yellow card) 25'; Vukojević (yellow card) 54'; Husyev (yellow card) 90+4'	Stadium: Mestalla; Attendance: 26,261; Referee: Deniz Aytekin (Germany)

== Squad statistics ==
As of 17 May 2014

=== Appearances and goals ===
No.	Pos	Nat	Player	Total		Premier League		Ukrainian Cup		Europa League	
No.	Pos	Nat	Player	Apps	Goals	Apps	Goals	Apps	Goals	Apps	Goals
1	GK	(Ukraine) UKR	Oleksandr Shovkovskyi	14	0	7	0	2	0	5	0
2	DF	(Brazil) BRA	Danilo Silva	32	0	21	0	5	0	6	0
3	DF	(Ukraine) UKR	Yevhen Selin	11	0	7+3	0	0+1	0	0	0
4	MF	(Portugal) POR	Miguel Veloso	31	2	17+2	1	4	0	8	1
5	MF	(Croatia) CRO	Ognjen Vukojević	30	1	15+3	1	2+2	0	6+2	0
6	DF	(Austria) AUT	Aleksandar Dragović	34	0	20	0	5	0	9	0
7	FW	(Netherlands) NED	Jeremain Lens	40	6	18+9	4	3+1	0	8+1	2
9	FW	(Ukraine) UKR	Roman Bezus	23	3	6+8	2	1+1	0	1+6	1
10	FW	(Ukraine) UKR	Andriy Yarmolenko	38	20	24+1	11	3+1	4	9	5
11	FW	(Nigeria) NGR	Brown Ideye	29	10	7+12	5	2+1	3	6+1	2
16	MF	(Ukraine) UKR	Serhiy Sydorchuk	21	2	10+3	2	2+2	0	3+1	0
19	MF	(Ukraine) UKR	Denys Harmash	17	4	10+3	2	3	2	0+1	0
20	MF	(Ukraine) UKR	Oleh Husyev	39	8	18+7	3	3+1	2	5+5	3
22	FW	(Ukraine) UKR	Artem Kravets	1	0	0	0	0	0	0+1	0
23	GK	(Ukraine) UKR	Oleksandr Rybka	12	0	9	0	1	0	1+1	0
24	DF	(Croatia) CRO	Domagoj Vida	25	1	15+2	0	3+1	1	2+2	0
25	MF	(Nigeria) NGR	Lukman Haruna	24	4	9+8	3	1+1	1	4+1	0
27	DF	(Ukraine) UKR	Yevhen Makarenko	29	1	17+1	1	4+1	0	4+2	0
30	MF	(Ukraine) UKR	Ihor Kharatin	1	0	0+1	0	0	0	0	0
34	DF	(Ukraine) UKR	Yevhen Khacheridi	24	0	16	0	1	0	7	0
35	GK	(Ukraine) UKR	Maksym Koval	24	0	12	0	2	0	10	0
45	MF	(Ukraine) UKR	Vladyslav Kalytvyntsev	5	1	2+1	1	0+2	0	0	0
77	MF	(Ukraine) UKR	Andriy Tsurikov	4	0	1+2	0	1	0	0	0
85	FW	(Democratic Republic of the Congo) COD	Dieumerci Mbokani	32	16	21+3	13	2	1	4+2	2
90	MF	(Morocco) MAR	Younès Belhanda	32	7	18+3	6	3	0	8	1
Players who left Dynamo Kyiv on loan during the season :
33	DF	(France) FRA	Benoît Trémoulinas	10	0	7	0	1	0	2	0
99	MF	(Brazil) BRA	Dudu	11	1	1+6	0	1	1	1+2	0
Players who left Dynamo Kyiv during the season :

=== Goalscorers ===
Place	Position	Nation	Number	Name	Premier League	Ukrainian Cup	Europa League	Total
1	FW	(Ukraine)	10	Andriy Yarmolenko	11	4	5	20
2	FW	(Democratic Republic of the Congo)	85	Dieumerci Mbokani	13	1	2	16
3	FW	(Nigeria)	11	Brown Ideye	5	3	2	10
4	MF	(Ukraine)	20	Oleh Husyev	3	2	3	8
5	MF	(Morocco)	90	Younès Belhanda	6	0	1	7
6	FW	(Netherlands)	7	Jeremain Lens	4	0	2	6
7	MF	(Ukraine)	19	Denys Harmash	2	2	0	4
7	MF	(Nigeria)	25	Lukman Haruna	3	1	0	4
9	FW	(Ukraine)	9	Roman Bezus	2	0	1	3
9				Own goal	0	1	2	3
11	MF	(Ukraine)	16	Serhiy Sydorchuk	2	0	0	2
11	MF	(Portugal)	4	Miguel Veloso	1	0	1	2
13	MF	(Croatia)	5	Ognjen Vukojević	1	0	0	1
13	MF	(Ukraine)	45	Vladyslav Kalytvyntsev	1	0	0	1
13	DF	(Ukraine)	27	Yevhen Makarenko	1	0	0	1
13	MF	(Brazil)	99	Dudu	0	1	0	1
13	DF	(Croatia)	24	Domagoj Vida	0	1	0	1
				TOTALS	55	15	19	89

=== Disciplinary record ===
Number	Nation	Position	Name	Premier League		Ukrainian Cup		Europa League		Total	
Number	Nation	Position	Name	Yellow card	Red card	Yellow card	Red card	Yellow card	Red card	Yellow card	Red card
2	(Brazil)	DF	Danilo Silva	3	0	0	0	2	0	5	0
3	(Ukraine)	DF	Yevhen Selin	2	0	0	0	0	0	2	0
5	(Croatia)	MF	Ognjen Vukojević	6	1	2	0	3	0	11	1
6	(Austria)	DF	Aleksandar Dragović	6	0	1	0	3	0	10	0
7	(Netherlands)	FW	Jeremain Lens	1	0	1	0	2	0	4	0
9	(Ukraine)	FW	Roman Bezus	1	0	1	0	0	0	2	0
10	(Democratic Republic of the Congo)	FW	Andriy Yarmolenko	4	1	2	1	3	0	9	2
11	(Nigeria)	FW	Brown Ideye	0	1	0	0	0	0	0	1
16	(Ukraine)	MF	Serhiy Sydorchuk	3	0	1	0	3	0	7	0
19	(Ukraine)	MF	Denys Harmash	3	0	0	0	0	0	3	0
20	(Ukraine)	MF	Oleh Husyev	3	0	1	0	1	0	5	0
24	(Croatia)	DF	Domagoj Vida	3	0	2	0	1	0	6	0
25	(Nigeria)	MF	Lukman Haruna	7	0	1	0	1	0	9	0
27	(Ukraine)	DF	Yevhen Makarenko	4	1	0	0	0	0	4	1
33	(France)	DF	Benoît Trémoulinas	1	0	1	0	0	0	2	0
34	(Ukraine)	DF	Yevhen Khacheridi	5	0	1	0	1	0	7	0
35	(Ukraine)	GK	Maksym Koval	1	0	0	0	1	0	2	0
45	(Ukraine)	MF	Vladyslav Kalytvyntsev	1	0	0	0	0	0	1	0
85	(Democratic Republic of the Congo)	FW	Dieumerci Mbokani	4	0	1	0	2	1	7	1
90	(Morocco)	MF	Younès Belhanda	6	0	0	0	2	0	8	0
			TOTALS	64	3	15	1	25	1	104	5

== Notes ==
Notes

1. On 19 February 2014, UEFA announced that it had decided to change the venue of the Dynamo Kyiv v Valencia match from Olympic Stadium, Kyiv, Ukraine, to GSP Stadium, Nicosia, Cyprus, due to riots in Kyiv.
2. Rapid Wien played their home matches at Ernst-Happel-Stadion, Vienna instead of their regular stadium, Gerhard Hanappi Stadium, Vienna.
