= Makarevich =

Makarevich (Belarusian: Макарэвіч; Russian: Макаре́вич) is a Belarusian and Russian surname, related to the Latin given name Macarius. It may refer to:

- Anatoly Makarevich (born 1970), Belarusian runner
- Andrey Makarevich (born 1953), Soviet and Russian rock musician
- Konstantin Makarevich (1922–2017), Soviet and Kazakhstani glaciologist
- Nikolay Makarevich (born 2002), Belarusian footballer
- Oleg Makarevich (born 1962), Russian general

== See also ==
- Makarenko
- Makarov (surname)
