= Macarena (disambiguation) =

"Macarena" is a 1993 song by Los del Río most well known for its 1995 remix, as well as the name of its accompanying dance.

Macarena may also refer to:

- Macarena (name), Spanish given name
- Virgin of Hope of Macarena, Catholic Virgin from Seville, Spain
- "Macarena", a song by Damso
- "Macarena", a song by Pietro Lombardi
- The Macarena (drag queen), Spanish drag queen

== Places ==
- Macarena, Seville, a neighborhood in Seville, Spain
- Puerta de la Macarena (Seville), a wall gate in Seville
- La Macarena, Meta, a village in Meta Department, Colombia
- Serranía de la Macarena, a mountain range in Colombia

== See also ==
- Maracena, a municipality located in the province of Granada, Spain
- Macaranga, a genus of Old World tropical trees
