= Jeremain Lens =

Dutch footballer (born 1987)

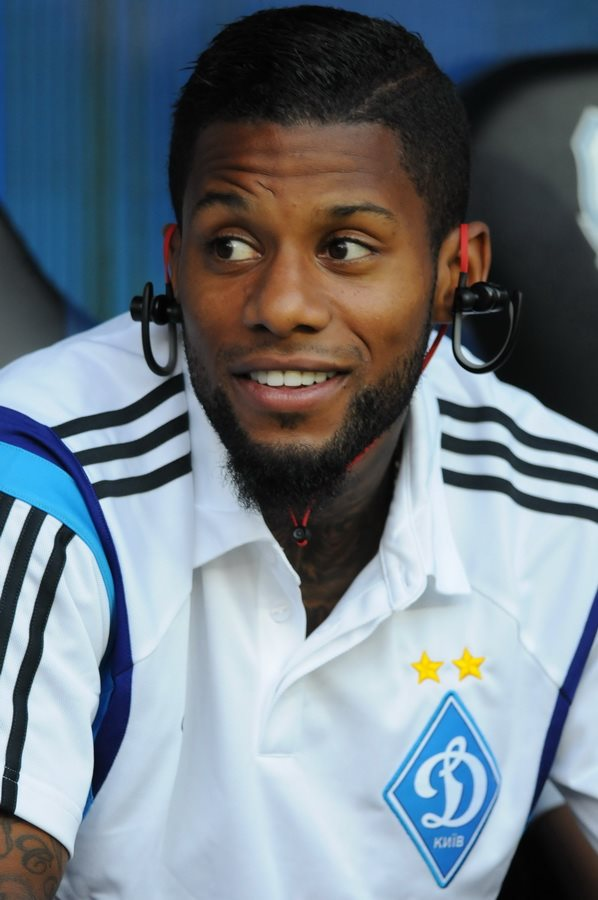
- Lens with Dynamo Kyiv in 2015

Personal information
- Full name: Jeremain Marciano Lens
- Date of birth: 24 November 1987 (age 38)
- Place of birth: Amsterdam, Netherlands
- Height: 1.78 m (5 ft 10 in)
- Position: Left winger

Youth career
- VVA/Spartaan
- Ajax
- Omniworld
- AZ

Senior career*
Years	Team	Apps	(Gls)
2006–2010	AZ	55	(13)
2007–2008	→ NEC (loan)	31	(9)
2010–2013	PSV	96	(34)
2013–2015	Dynamo Kyiv	49	(10)
2015–2018	Sunderland	22	(3)
2016–2017	→ Fenerbahçe (loan)	26	(4)
2017–2018	→ Beşiktaş (loan)	24	(1)
2018–2022	Beşiktaş	53	(4)
2021	→ Fatih Karagümrük (loan)	16	(3)
2022–2024	Versailles	41	(9)
Total		413	(90)

International career
2006	Netherlands U19	2	(1)
2006–2007	Netherlands U20	4	(0)
2007–2008	Netherlands U21	5	(0)
2010–2017	Netherlands	34	(8)
Medal record
Representing Netherlands
FIFA World Cup
Third place	2014 Brazil
- * Club domestic league appearances and goals

Jeremain Marciano Lens (born 24 November 1987) is a Dutch former professional footballer. He was a versatile attacking player, known for his pace and stamina, primarily being used as a left winger or a striker, but he could also successfully play as a second striker.

Lens began his career at AZ, and after a loan at NEC, played a part in their 2008–09 Eredivisie triumph. In 2010, he moved to PSV, where he won the 2011–12 KNVB Cup, and in 2013 was signed by Dynamo Kyiv. He won the Ukrainian Cup in his first season, the double in his second, and signed for Sunderland in July 2015.

Lens was a full international for the Netherlands, and has earned 34 caps. In August 2010, he received his first international cap against Ukraine and scored a debut goal. He was part of the Dutch squad which came third at the 2014 FIFA World Cup.

== Club career ==
=== AZ ===
Lens made his debut into professional football in the 2005–06 season. He played two matches for AZ that season. Before that, he played in the youth team of AZ, Omniworld, Ajax and his regional team, Spartaan.

In June 2007, AZ reached a deal concerning a loan involving Lens; it meant he would play the 2007–08 season for NEC, and that he would return to AZ the season afterwards. Lens agreed with the deal, and the player officially joined NEC on loan in the summer of 2007.

==== NEC (loan) ====
After a difficult beginning with his new club NEC before the winter, Lens' as well as his team's situation improved with Lens scoring eight goals in 16 matches. NEC qualified for the UEFA Cup preliminaries. For a long time, it seemed he would join NEC permanently, but he eventually decided to return to AZ.

==== Return to AZ ====
In July 2008, Lens had an operation on his left foot, which meant he was out for some time. The 2008–09 season was a personal disappointment for Lens, who did not contribute much to AZ's championship win. When head coach Louis van Gaal left the team for Bayern Munich, Lens saw a chance for himself to play more matches. He grabbed the chance under the new coach, and he played well and scored important goals for AZ.

=== PSV ===
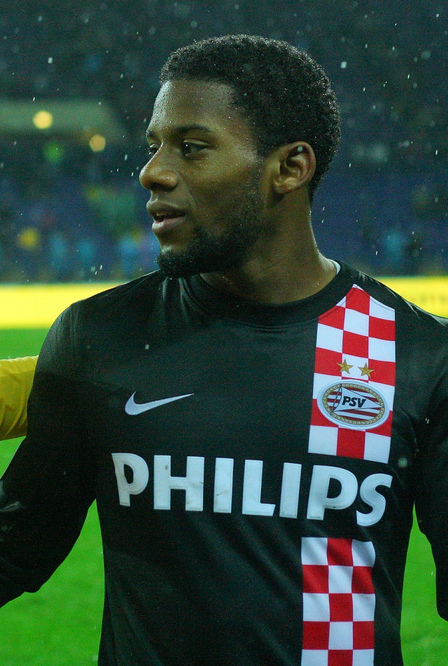
Lens at PSV Eindhoven in 2010

On 21 May 2010, PSV contracted Lens for four years, swapping Dirk Marcellis as part of the deal. Lens was given the number 9 shirt, and his first year at the club was a successful one for the player. He was moved from a central position to the flanks, being more utilised on both wings or working behind strikers as a second striker. He struggled to score in first few matches, but eventually became used to the new position. He reached the Europa League quarter-finals with the team, scoring 3 goals in 11 appearances, and reached 10 Eredivisie goals in 33 appearances, while the Eindhoven-based team only finished in third place, despite being the table leaders for most of the 2010–11 season.

At the beginning of the 2011–12 season, Lens' jersey number was changed to number 11, which was free since the departure of Nordin Amrabat to Kayserispor in January 2011. On 6 November 2011, Lens came in from the bench against Heracles and scored a hat-trick, his first for the club.

=== Dynamo Kyiv ===
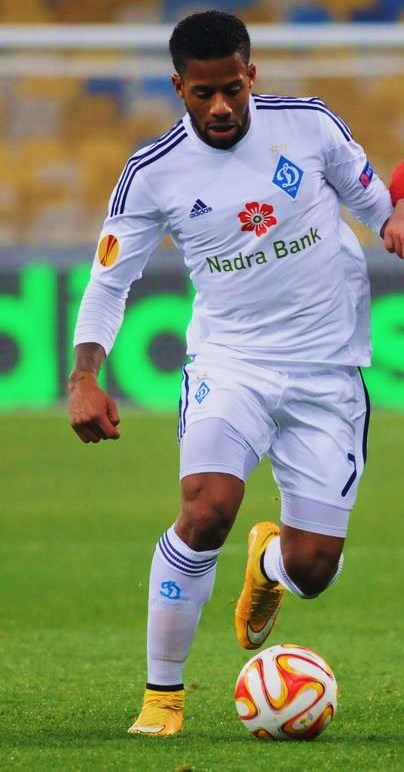
Lens playing for Dynamo Kyiv in 2014

On 18 June 2013, Lens signed a four-year contract with Ukrainian club Dynamo Kyiv. On 29 August, he scored his first official goal for Dynamo, opening the score on the ninth minute of a 5–1 victory over Kazakhstani club Aktobe in the UEFA Europa League play-offs second leg, an 8–3 aggregate win. On 6 October, Lens scored his first two goals in the Ukrainian Premier League in a crushing 9–1 victory over Metalurh Donetsk. He helped Dynamo win the Ukrainian Cup in his first season.

On 23 April 2015, Lens was sent off for two bookings in the first half, as Dynamo lost 0–2 at Fiorentina and were eliminated from the quarter-finals of the Europa League. His second yellow card was when the referee judged that he had dived in the penalty area. In his second and final season for Dynamo, he managed to help his team win both the Premier League and Ukrainian Cup without suffering a single defeat in both competitions.

=== Sunderland ===
On 15 July 2015, after completing a medical, Sunderland signed Lens for an undisclosed fee on a four-year contract. This move reunited him with head coach Dick Advocaat after previously working under him at PSV and AZ.

Lens scored his first English Premier League goal on 29 August 2015, securing a 2–2 draw at Aston Villa. He scored his second Sunderland goal against West Ham United on 3 October 2015, lobbing the ball over goalkeeper Adrián to put Sunderland 2–0 ahead. However, Lens was then sent off after receiving two yellow cards for rash tackles, and West Ham went on to earn a 2–2 draw. The match turned out to be Advocaat's final one in charge of Sunderland, as he left the club the next day.

Lens stated he was unhappy at Sunderland, suggesting he could leave the club in the January transfer window as he "did not come to the Premier League to sit on the bench". Lens started in Sunderland's FA Cup third round tie against Arsenal, and scored the opening goal in the match, after which Arsenal came back to win 3–1.

==== Fenerbahçe (loan) ====
On 30 August 2016, Lens was loaned to Fenerbahçe on a season-long deal.

=== Beşiktaş ===
On 6 August 2017, Beşiktaş signed Lens on loan, with the option of a permanent transfer afterwards. He scored his debut goal for the club in a 2–2 draw against Trabzonspor. Playing as a replacement for Ricardo Quaresma, he managed to find the net in the 58th minute of the match. On 7 June 2018, it was confirmed that Lens had signed four years contract for Beşiktaş.

=== Versailles ===
After not playing for any club in the 2021–22 season despite remaining under contract with Beşiktaş, on 28 July 2022 Lens signed with French third-tier Championnat National club Versailles. He made his debut for the club on 26 August 2022, replacing Jordan Leborgne in the 69th minute of a 2–0 home win over Bourg-en-Bresse Péronnas. Lens scored his first goal for Versailles on 25 November, coming off the bench for Mondy Prunier and scoring in injury time to secure a 2–0 victory against Villefranche Beaujolais. In May 2024, Lens announced he would retire at the end of the season.

== International career ==
=== Suriname ===
Although Lens previously played for the Netherlands under-21 team, he chose to play for the Suriname national team, since his roots (parents) are Surinamese. In 2009, Lens was called up for Suriname's squad by national team coach Wensley Bundel, for the Parbo Bier Cup. He scored two goals in three matches and helped Suriname finish second in the tournament.

Since the tournament was not under the auspices of FIFA, Lens was still eligible for a call-up for the Netherlands.

=== Netherlands ===
On 3 May 2010, Lens was called up for the Dutch national team, as a part of the preparations for the 2010 FIFA World Cup. However, on 27 May 2010, Netherlands manager Bert van Marwijk announced that the player would not be part of the final 23-man squad participating in the competition. On 11 August 2010, Lens made his debut in a 1–1 friendly draw with Ukraine, scoring the only goal for the Oranje.

Lens became a regular member of the Dutch team under the management of his former AZ coach Louis van Gaal. He scored five goals and made a further five assists during the 2014 World Cup qualification campaign.

Lens was named in the Netherlands squad for the 2014 World Cup in Brazil. He appeared as a substitute in the Netherlands' first two Group B games (a 1–5 win over Spain and a 2–3 victory against Australia) before starting in a 2–0 victory over Chile.

== Career statistics ==
=== Club ===
As of 15 May 2021

Appearances and goals by club, season and competition
Club	Season	League			National cup		League cup		Continental		Other		Total	
Club	Season	Division	Apps	Goals	Apps	Goals	Apps	Goals	Apps	Goals	Apps	Goals	Apps	Goals
AZ	2005–06	Eredivisie	2	0	0	0	—		0	0	—		2	0
AZ	2006–07	Eredivisie	14	1	0	0	—		0	0	—		14	1
AZ	2007–08	Eredivisie	0	0	0	0	—		0	0	—		0	0
AZ	2008–09	Eredivisie	8	1	0	0	—		0	0	—		8	1
AZ	2009–10	Eredivisie	32	12	2	0	—		5 (Note: Appearances in UEFA Champions League)	2	1 (Note: Appearance in Johan Cruyff Shield)	2	40	16
AZ	Total		56	14	2	0	0	0	5	2	1	2	64	18
NEC (loan)	2007–08	Eredivisie	31	13	0	0	—		—		—		31	13
PSV	2010–11	Eredivisie	33	10	2	0	—		13 (Note: Appearances in UEFA Europa League)	3	—		48	13
PSV	2011–12	Eredivisie	33	9	5	1	—		12	1	—		50	11
PSV	2012–13	Eredivisie	30	15	3	0	—		6	3	1	1	40	19
PSV	Total		96	34	10	1	0	0	31	7	1	1	138	43
Dynamo Kyiv	2013–14	Ukrainian Premier League	28	5	4	0	—		9	2	—		41	7
Dynamo Kyiv	2014–15	Ukrainian Premier League	21	5	6	1	—		10	3	0	0	37	9
Dynamo Kyiv	Total		49	10	10	1	0	0	19	5	0	0	78	16
Sunderland	2015–16	Premier League	20	3	1	1	1	0	—		—		22	4
Sunderland	2016–17	Premier League	2	0	0	0	0	0	—		—		2	0
Sunderland	Total		22	3	1	1	1	0	0	0	0	0	24	4
Fenerbahçe (loan)	2016–17	Süper Lig	26	4	5	0	—		5	1	—		36	5
Beşiktaş (loan)	2017–18	Süper Lig	24	1	6	3	—		2	0	—		32	4
Beşiktaş	2018–19	Süper Lig	28	1	0	0	—		9	4	—		37	5
Beşiktaş	2019–20	Süper Lig	23	2	2	0	—		4	0	—		29	2
Beşiktaş	2020–21	Süper Lig	2	1	0	0	—		2 (Note: One appearance in UEFA Champions League, one appearance in UEFA Europa League)	0	—		4	1
Beşiktaş	Total		53	4	2	0	0	0	15	4	0	0	70	8
Fatih Karagümrük (loan)	2020–21	Süper Lig	16	3	—		—		—		—		16	3
Career total			372	86	36	6	1	0	77	19	2	3	489	114

=== International ===
Scores and results list Templatonia's goal tally first, score column indicates score after each Lens goal.

List of international goals scored by Jeremain Lens
No.	Date	Venue	Opponent	Score	Result	Competition
1	11 August 2010	Donbas Arena, Donetsk, Ukraine	Ukraine	1–0	1–1	Friendly
2	11 September 2012	Puskás Ferenc Stadion, Budapest, Hungary	Hungary	1–0	4–1	2014 FIFA World Cup qualification
3	11 September 2012	Puskás Ferenc Stadion, Budapest, Hungary	Hungary	3–1	4–1	2014 FIFA World Cup qualification
4	16 October 2012	Arena Națională, Bucharest, Romania	Romania	1–0	4–1	2014 FIFA World Cup qualification
5	6 February 2013	Amsterdam Arena, Amsterdam, Netherlands	Italy	1–0	1–1	Friendly
6	26 March 2013	Amsterdam Arena, Amsterdam, Netherlands	Romania	4–0	4–0	2014 FIFA World Cup qualification
7	11 October 2013	Amsterdam Arena, Amsterdam, Netherlands	Hungary	3–0	8–1	2014 FIFA World Cup qualification
8	4 June 2014	Amsterdam Arena, Amsterdam, Netherlands	Wales	2–0	2–0	Friendly

== Honours ==
AZ

- Eredivisie: 2008–09
- Johan Cruyff Shield: 2009

PSV

- KNVB Cup: 2011–12
- Johan Cruyff Shield: 2012

Dynamo Kyiv

- Ukrainian Premier League: 2014–15
- Ukrainian Cup: 2013–14, 2014–15

Netherlands

- FIFA World Cup Third place: 2014
