= Makarije =

Makarije is a Serbian name, a form of the Greek name Makarios.

Notable people with the name include:

- Hieromonk Makarije, Serbian printer of the late 15th century and 16th century
- Makarije Sokolović (died 1574), patriarch of Peć
