= Macarius =

Macarius is a Latinized form of the old Greek given name Makários (Μακάριος), meaning "happy, fortunate, blessed"; compare the Latin beatus and felix. Ancient Greeks applied the epithet Makarios to the gods.

In other languages the name has the following forms:

- Finnish: the given name Kari or Karri. Derived surname: Mäkäräinen.
- Greek: Makarios (Μακάριος)
- Armenian: Մակար (Makar)
- Italian: Macario (also a family name)
- Portuguese: Macário
- Spanish Macarena (name)
- Russian/Ukrainian/Belarusian: Makar (Макар) from Church Slavonic Makariy (Макарій). Derived surnames: Makarov/Makarova, Makarenko, Makarchuk, Makarevich.
- Serbian: Makarije/Макарије
- Romanian: Macarescu (surname)
- French: Macaire
- Dutch: Karis, Kerris (also a surname)

== People named Macarius ==
- Macarous of Alexandria, a martyr, saint, and companion of Faustus, Abibus and Dionysius of Alexandria (died 250)
- Macarius of Egypt (300–390), Egyptian monk and hermit. Also known as Pseudo-Macarius, Macarius-Symeon, Macarius the Elder, or St. Macarius the Great
- Pseudo-Macarius (4th/5th century), Syrian author
- Macarius of Jerusalem, Bishop in 314–333
- Macarius of Alexandria, also known as Macarius the Younger (died 395)
- Macarius Magnes, 4th century Christian author of an apology "Apocriticus"
- Macarius I of Antioch: Patriarch of Antioch, deposed in 681
- Pope Macarius I of Alexandria, ruled in 933–953
- Pope Macarius II of Alexandria, ruled in 1102–1128
- Macarius (archbishop of Esztergom), ruled in 1142–1147
- Macarius II of Antioch, Patriarch in 1164–1166
- Macarius of Unzha (1349–1444), founder of several Russian monasteries.
- Macarius, Metropolitan of Moscow (1482–1563)
- Macarius III Ibn al-Za'im, Melkite Patriarch of Antioch from 1647 to 1672
- Macarius, elder of Optina monastery
- Macarius of Corinth (1731–1805), Metropolitan bishop of Corinth
- Macarius IV Tawil, Patriarch of the Melkite Greek Catholic Church in 1813–1815
- Macarius I, head of the Holy Synod in 1879–1882 in Russia, better known as his church's leading historian
- Macarius (Nevsky), head of the Holy Synod in 1912–1917 in Russia
- Makarios I, archbishop of Cyprus from 1854 to 1865
- Pope Macarius III of Alexandria, ruled in 1944–1945
- Makarios II, archbishop of Cyprus from 1948 to 1950
- Makarios III, archbishop (1950–1977) and president of Cyprus (1960–1977)
- Archbishop Makarios of Nairobi, Eastern Orthodox Archbishop of Nairobi since 2001
- Archbishop Makarios of Australia, Greek Orthodox Archbishop of Australia since 2019
- Macarius of Lviv, Metropolitan of Lviv, bishop of the Orthodox Church of Ukraine

== See also ==
- Makario (disambiguation)
