= Mäkäräinen =

Origin
- Language: Finnish
- Meaning: derived from the name Makarios and patronymic suffix -nen
- Region of origin: Finland

Mäkäräinen is a surname originating in Finland, derived from the given name Makar (Makarios). Although the surname is common in Kainuu, particularly in Puolanka, Ristijärvi and Paltamo, it is relatively rare elsewhere in Finland. All total, 1,060 people, living or dead have had Mäkäräinen as their surname at some point in time.

A variant form of the surname outside of Finland can be found without the diacritics: Makarainen.

In addition, the word mäkäräinen can refer to black flies in some dialects of Finnish. The correct word in the literary language is mäkärä.

Notable people with the surname include:

- Jasse Mäkäräinen, Finnish ice hockey player
- Juho Mäkäräinen, a Finnish shoemaker and "village philosopher", whose home is now a museum in Herrala, Hollola, Finland.
- Kaisa Mäkäräinen, Finnish biathlete
