= Makaranka =

Makaranka is a Belarusian surname derived from the given name Makar. Notable people with the surname include:

- Aliaksandr Makaranka (born 1990), Belarusian weightlifter
- Viachaslau Makaranka (born 1975), Belarusian sport wrestler

== See also ==
- Makarenko, Ukrainian
