= Makario =

Makario may refer to:

- Makario Tagini, Solomon Islands politician
- Makario Stadium, building in Cyprus

== See also ==
- Makarios
