= Makarenko =

Makarenko (also Macarenko) is a Ukrainian surname derived from the given name Makar (Macarius). It may refer to:

- Anton Makarenko (1888–1939) Soviet-Ukrainian educator
- Anton Makarenko (footballer) (born 1988), Ukrainian footballer
- Daria Makarenko (born 1992), Russian footballer
- Evgeny Makarenko (born 1975), Russian boxer
- Gloria Macarenko, Canadian journalist
- Herman Makarenko (born 1961), Ukrainian conductor
- Kristina Makarenko (born 1997), Russian athlete
- Mikhail Makarenko (1931–2007), Soviet dissident
- Sergei Makarenko (born 1937), Soviet-Ukrainian sprint canoeist
- Yevhen Makarenko (born 1991), Ukrainian footballer

== See also ==
- Makaranka, Belarusian
