= Yevhen Makarenko =

Ukrainian footballer

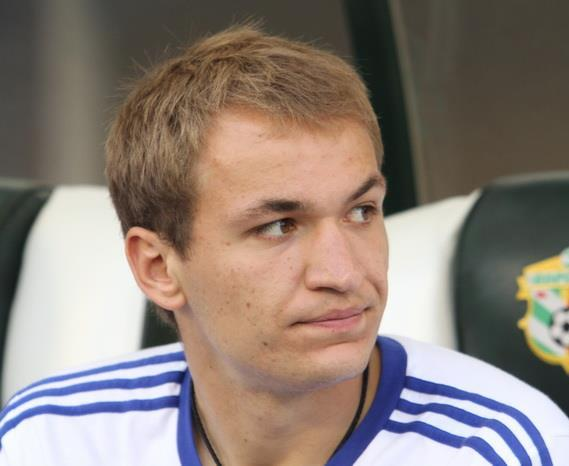
- Makarenko in 2014

Personal information
- Full name: Yevhen Oleksandrovych Makarenko
- Date of birth: 21 May 1991 (age 35)
- Place of birth: Kyiv, Ukrainian SSR
- Height: 1.86 m (6 ft 1 in)
- Position: Defender

Team information
- Current team: Kyzylzhar
- Number: 8

Youth career
- 2004–2008: Dynamo Kyiv

Senior career*
Years	Team	Apps	(Gls)
2008–2016	Dynamo Kyiv	39	(2)
2010–2012	→ Dynamo-2 Kyiv	65	(4)
2012–2013	→ Hoverla Uzhhorod (loan)	25	(1)
2017–2018	Kortrijk	33	(0)
2018–2021	Anderlecht	15	(0)
2020–2021	→ Kortrijk (loan)	32	(3)
2021–2023	Fehérvár	46	(1)
2023–2024	Ordabasy	30	(2)
2026–	Kyzylzhar	25	(0)

International career^{‡}
2012	Ukraine U21	1	(0)
2014–2021	Ukraine	15	(0)
- * Club domestic league appearances and goals as of 1 November 2026 ‡ National team caps and goals as of 15 September 2021

Yevhen Oleksandrovych Makarenko (Ukrainian: Євген Олекса́ндрович Макаренко; born 21 May 1991) is a Ukrainian professional footballer who plays as a defender for Kyzylzhar.

== Career ==
He is product of FC Dynamo Kyiv sportive school. Makarenko was loaned to FC Hoverla Uzhhorod in Ukrainian Premier League from 10 July 2012.

On 11 August 2021, he joined Hungarian side Fehérvár FC.

He earned his first cap for the senior national football team of his country on 5 March 2014, in the 2–0 win over the United States.

== Honours ==
Dynamo Kyiv

- Ukrainian Premier League: 2014–15, 2015–16
- Ukrainian Cup: 2013–14, 2014–15
