= Valeriy Lebed =

Ukrainian footballer (born 1989)

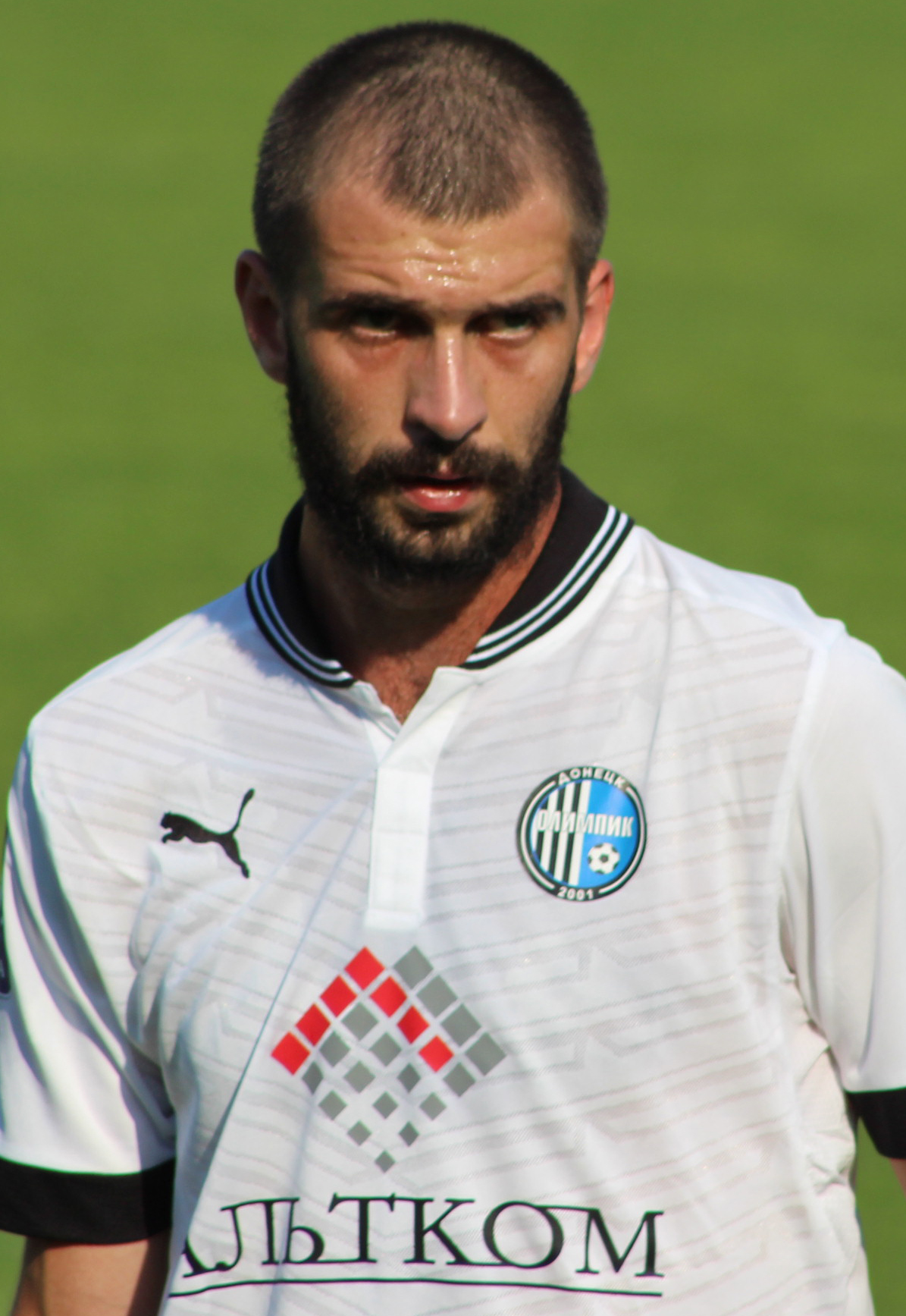

Personal information
- Full name: Valeriy Ihorovych Lebed
- Date of birth: 5 January 1989 (age 37)
- Place of birth: Kharkiv, Ukrainian SSR
- Height: 1.77 m (5 ft 10 in)
- Position: Midfielder

Youth career
- 2002–2006: Shakhtar Donetsk

Senior career*
Years	Team	Apps	(Gls)
2006–2009	Shakhtar Donetsk	0	(0)
2006–2008	→ Shakhtar-3 Donetsk	32	(2)
2010–2016	Olimpik Donetsk	98	(8)
2017	Veres Rivne	2	(0)
2017	Sumy	9	(0)
2018	Polissya Zhytomyr	8	(0)

International career^{‡}
2004	Ukraine U16	4	(0)
2007	Ukraine U18	3	(0)
- * Club domestic league appearances and goals as of 10 April 2018 ‡ National team caps and goals as of 10 April 2018

Valeriy Ihorovych Lebed (Ukrainian: Валерій Ігорович Лебедь; born 5 January 1989) is a Ukrainian professional footballer who plays as a midfielder.
