= Volodymyr Ordynskyi =

Ukrainian footballer

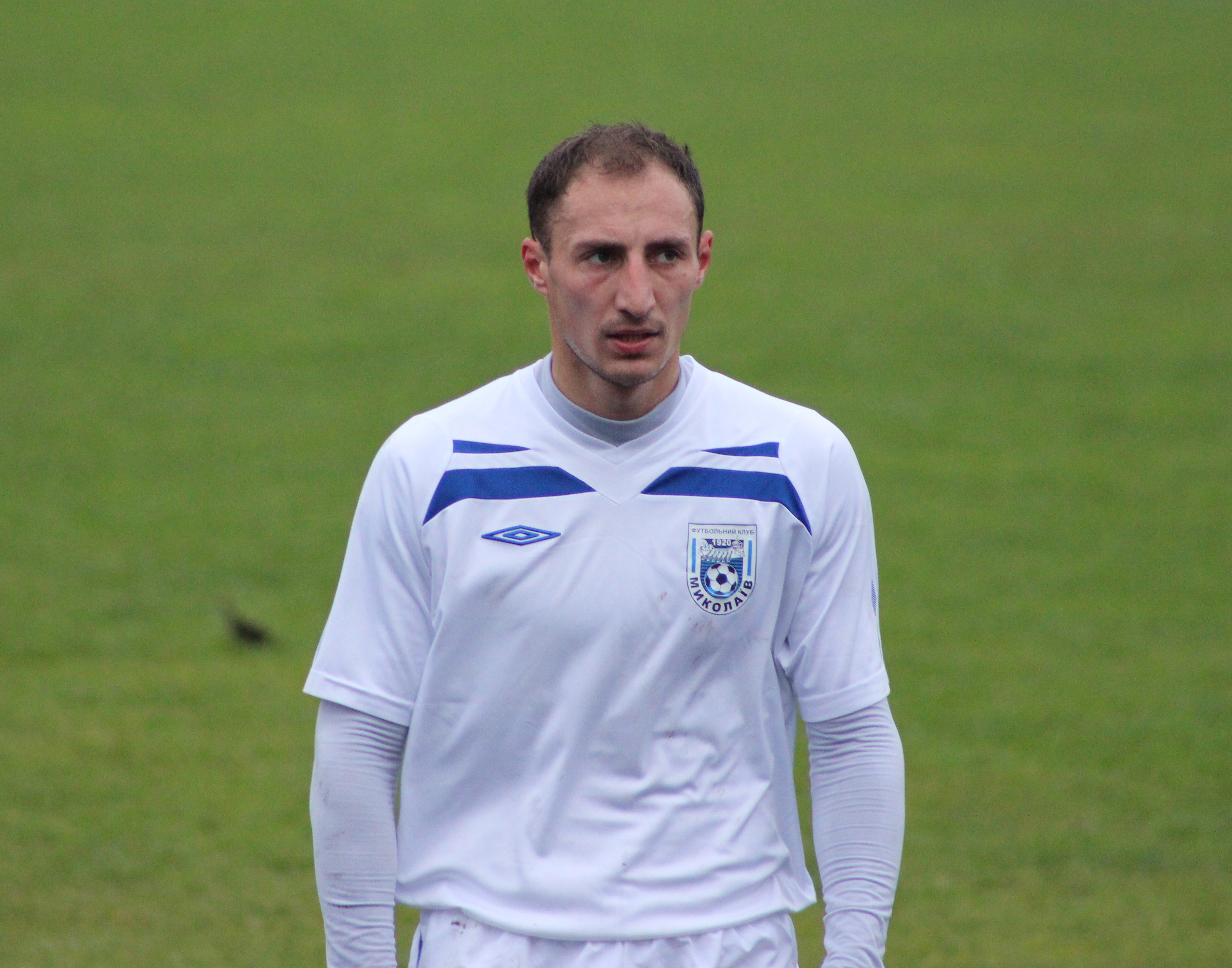

Personal information
- Full name: Volodymyr Dmytrovych Ordynskyi
- Date of birth: 12 April 1985 (age 41)
- Place of birth: Yablunivka, Kyiv Oblast, Ukrainian SSR
- Height: 1.76 m (5 ft 9 1/2 in)
- Position: Striker

Youth career
- 1998–2001: FC Kamenyar Bila Tserkva
- 2001–2002: FC Zmina Bila Tserkva
- 2003: FC Kamenyar Bila Tserkva

Senior career*
Years	Team	Apps	(Gls)
2004	FC Komunalnyk Bila Tserkva (amateur)	?	(?)
2005–2006	FC Ros Bila Tserkva	20	(0)
2006–2008	FC Arsenal Bila Tserkva	31	(1)
2008	FC Bil-Stal Bila Tserkva (amateur)	?	(?)
2009	FC Inter Fursy (amateur)	?	(?)
2010	FC Putrivka (amateur)	?	(?)
2010–2011	FC Gagra	9	(1)
2012	FC Arsenal Bila Tserkva	23	(0)
2013	FC Putrivka (amateur)	?	(?)
2013	MFC Mykolaiv	16	(1)
2013	FC Hranit Shakrivka (amateur)	?	(?)
2014	FC Kolos Kovalivka	21	(7)
2014–2015	FC Arsenal-Kyivshchyna Bila Tserkva	24	(5)
2015	FC Obukhiv (amateur)	?	(?)
2015	FC LNZ-Lebedyn Lebedyn (amateur)	?	(?)
2016	FK Dečić	?	(?)
2016	FK Radnički Berane	14	(3)
2017	Phnom Penh Crown	0	(0)
- * Club domestic league appearances and goals as of 1 February 2017

Volodymyr Ordynskyi (Ukrainian: Володимир Дмитрович Ординський; born 12 April 1985, in Yablunivka, Bila Tserkva Raion, Kyiv Oblast, Ukrainian SSR) is a Ukrainian football striker.

== Career ==
Ordynskyi is a product of his native Bila Tserkva Raion's youth sportive school system. His first trainer was Valeriy Pozdnyakov. During his career Ordynskyi played both, in the Ukrainian lower Leagues, and in the other football clubs.

In January 2017 he signed contract with Cambodian Phnom Penh Crown FC and made two appearances in 2017 AFC Cup play-off round against Home United from Singapore.
