= Anton Holenkov =

Ukrainian-Russian footballer

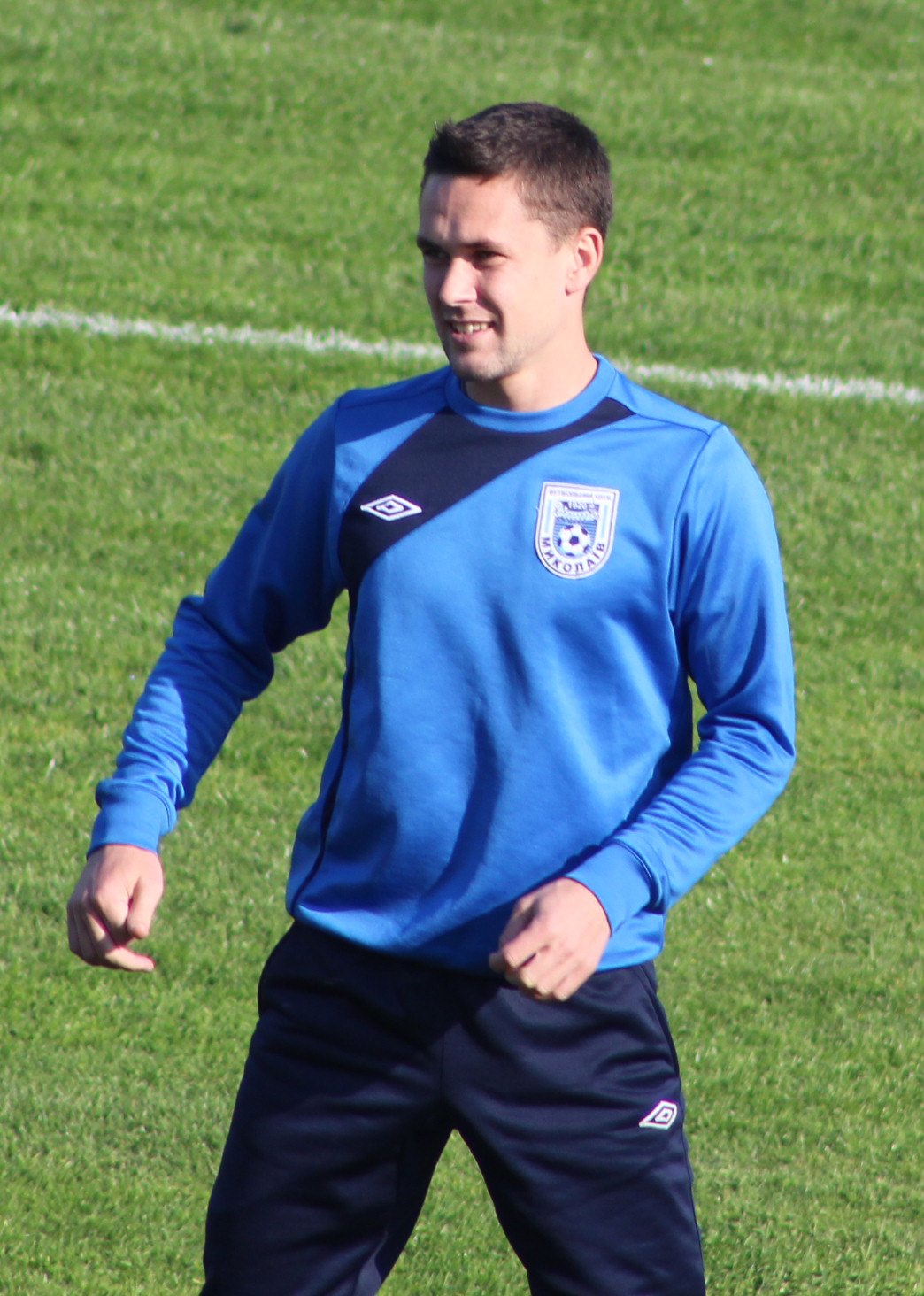

Personal information
- Full name: Anton Anatoliyovych Holenkov
- Date of birth: 17 December 1989 (age 36)
- Place of birth: Koreiz, Krym Oblast, Ukrainian SSR, Soviet Union
- Height: 1.75 m (5 ft 9 in)
- Position: Midfielder

Youth career
- 2002–2006: Youth Sport School Koreiz

Senior career*
Years	Team	Apps	(Gls)
2006–2008	Chornomornaftohaz Simferopol		
2007	→ Rekord+ Yalta		
2007	→ Arsenal Bila Tserkva	2	(1)
2008	Feniks-Illichovets Kalinine	18	(4)
2009	Foros-2 Yalta		
2009–2010	Metalurh Zaporizhya	0	(0)
2010	Dynamo Yalta		
2011	FC Koreiz		
2011–2013	Mykolaiv	64	(8)
2014–2015	Oleksandriya	41	(2)
2016	Torpedo-BelAZ Zhodino	26	(2)
2017–2023	Sevastopol	129	(13)
2023	TSK Simferopol	4	(0)
2024–	Chernomorets Sevastopol		
- * Club domestic league appearances and goals as of 31 December 2023

Anton Holenkov (Ukrainian: Антон Анатолійович Голенков); Anton Golenkov (Russian: Анто́н Анато́льевич Голенко́в; born 17 December 1989) is a Ukrainian (until 2014) and Russian football midfielder.

== Career ==
Holenkov is a product of his native Koreiz youth sport school system.

He played in the different Ukrainian amateur and Second League clubs. In 2015, he was promoted to Ukrainian Premier League together with his club FC Oleksandriya. In January 2016 Holenkov signed a contract with the Belarusian Premier League club FC Torpedo-BelAZ Zhodino.

In 2014, after the annexation of Koreiz, Crimea to Russia, received a Russian citizenship.
