= Macarena (name) =

Macarena is a Spanish female name, popular in Andalusia, in honor of the Virgin of Hope of Macarena. Some sources also say that the name comes from the Greek "Makarios", which means "happy".

Notable people bearing this name include:

- Macarena Achaga (born 1992), Argentine model and television host
- Macarena Aguilar (born 1985), Spanish handballer
- Macarena Alonso (born 1993), Argentine handballer
- Macarena García (born 1988), Spanish actress
- Macarena Gelman (born 1976), Uruguayan activist, granddaughter of the Argentine poet Juan Gelman
- Macarena Gómez (born 1978), Spanish actress
- Macarena Perez Grasset (born 1996), Chilean BMX cyclist
- Macarena Hernández, American academic and journalist specializing in Latino issues
- Macarena Lorente Anaya, Spanish politician
- Macarena Reyes (born 1984), Chilean athlete
- Macarena Ripamonti (born 1991), Chilean politician
- Macarena Rodríguez (born 1978), Argentine hockey player
- Macarena Sánchez (born 1991), Argentine football player
- Macarena Simari Birkner (born 1984), Argentine skier
- The Macarena (born 1991), Spanish drag queen
