= Dmytro Vladov =

Ukrainian footballer

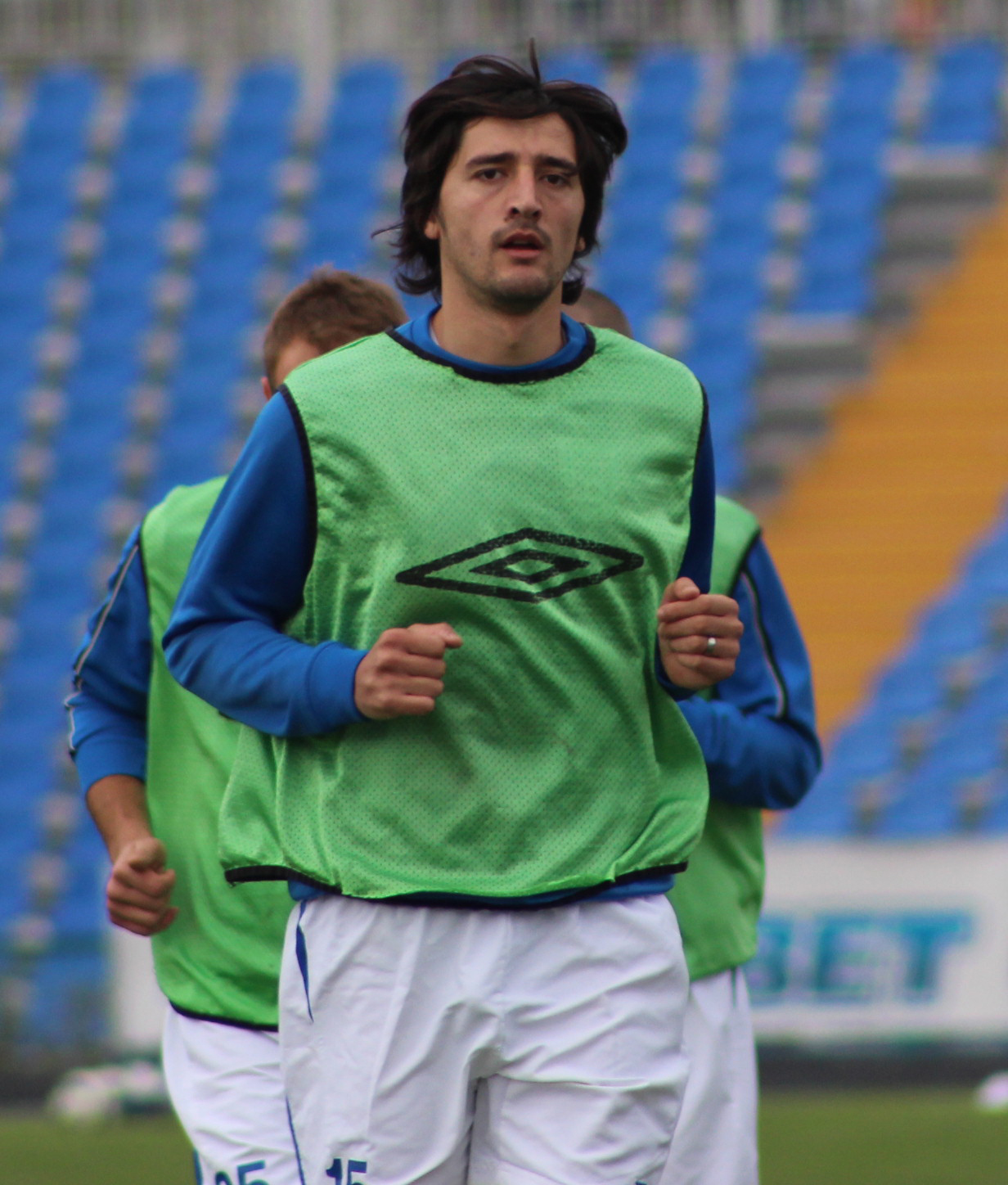
- Vladov in 2013

Personal information
- Full name: Dmytro Mykhaylovych Vladov
- Date of birth: 12 March 1990 (age 36)
- Place of birth: Zorya, Odesa Oblast, Ukrainian SSR, Soviet Union
- Height: 1.88 m (6 ft 2 in)
- Position: Midfielder

Youth career
- 2003–2007: DYuSSh-11 Chornomorets Odesa

Senior career*
Years	Team	Apps	(Gls)
2009–2012	Chornomorets Odesa	21	(0)
2010	→ Chornomorets-2 Odesa	3	(0)
2012	Nyva Vinnytsia	12	(1)
2012–2013	SKA Odesa	7	(0)
2013–2014	Mykolaiv	24	(2)
2014–2015	Real Pharma Odesa	7	(1)
2017	Governolese		
2017–2018	Castel d'Ario		
2018–	San Lazzaro		

International career
2007–2008	Ukraine U19	8	(0)
- * Club domestic league appearances and goals as of 1 March 2025

Dmytro Mykhaylovych Vladov (Ukrainian: Дмитро Михайлович Владов; born 12 March 1990) is a Ukrainian professional footballer who played as a midfielder. He is a product of Chornomorets Odesa academy and has played for the reserves and youth squad since 2007.

== Playing career ==
=== Club career ===
Vladov is a product of the Chornomorets Odesa youth academy. His first coach was A. N. Kucherevskyi. In July 2007, he joined Chornomorets' youth team. He made his Ukrainian Premier League debut on 1 August 2008 in a home match against Karpaty Lviv, which Chornomorets won 3–0. Vladov started the match and was substituted in the 73rd minute by Ruslan Hilazev. He could have made his league debut earlier, but he was recovering from a hand injury.

He made a total of nine appearances in the Ukrainian top division. In the 2010–11 season, he played for Chornomorets in the Ukrainian First League, where the club finished as runners-up. After leaving Chornomorets, he played in the First and Second Leagues for Nyva Vinnytsia, MFC Mykolaiv, SKA Odesa, and Real Pharma Odesa.

From the second half of the 2010s, Vladov played for amateur clubs in Italy.

=== International career ===
Vladov made eight appearances for the Ukraine under-19 national team. With the team, he won a bronze medal at the Valentin Granatkin Memorial in 2008.

In March 2010, he was called up to the Ukraine under-21 national team.
