= Serhiy Aleksanov =

Ukrainian football striker (born 1990)

Personal information
- Full name: Serhiy Ivanovych Aleksanov
- Date of birth: 12 February 1990 (age 36)
- Place of birth: Dnipropetrovsk, Ukrainian SSR
- Height: 1.76 m (5 ft 9 in)
- Position: Striker

Team information
- Current team: VPK-Ahro Shevchenkivka

Youth career
- 2003–2004: Inter Dnipropetrovsk
- 2004: Dnipro-75 Dnipropetrovsk
- 2004–2007: Dnipro Dnipropetrovsk

Senior career*
Years	Team	Apps	(Gls)
2007	Stekloplast Dnipropetrovsk	6	(6)
2007–2008	Dnipro-75 Dnipropetrovsk	3	(0)
2008–2013	Arsenal Bila Tserkva	130	(4)
2013–2014	Olimpik Donetsk	38	(3)
2014–2015	Hirnyk-Sport Komsomolsk	5	(0)
2015	Kremin Kremenchuk	11	(0)
2015	Avanhard Kramatorsk	18	(1)
2015–2017	Inhulets Petrove	28	(2)
2017	Mykolaiv	33	(4)
2017–2018	Polissya Zhytomyr	9	(0)
2019–	VPK-Ahro Shevchenkivka	16+	(3+)
- * Club domestic league appearances and goals as of 17 November 2019

Serhiy Ivanovych Aleksanov (Ukrainian: Сергій Іванович Алексанов; born 12 February 1990) is a Ukrainian footballer who plays as a striker for Ukrainian Polissya Zhytomyr.

Aleksanov is a product of the Dnipopetrovskàs youth sport schools and spent time playing for different Ukrainian First League teams. In 2013, he signed a contract with FC Olimpik Donetsk.
