= Konstantin Makarevich =

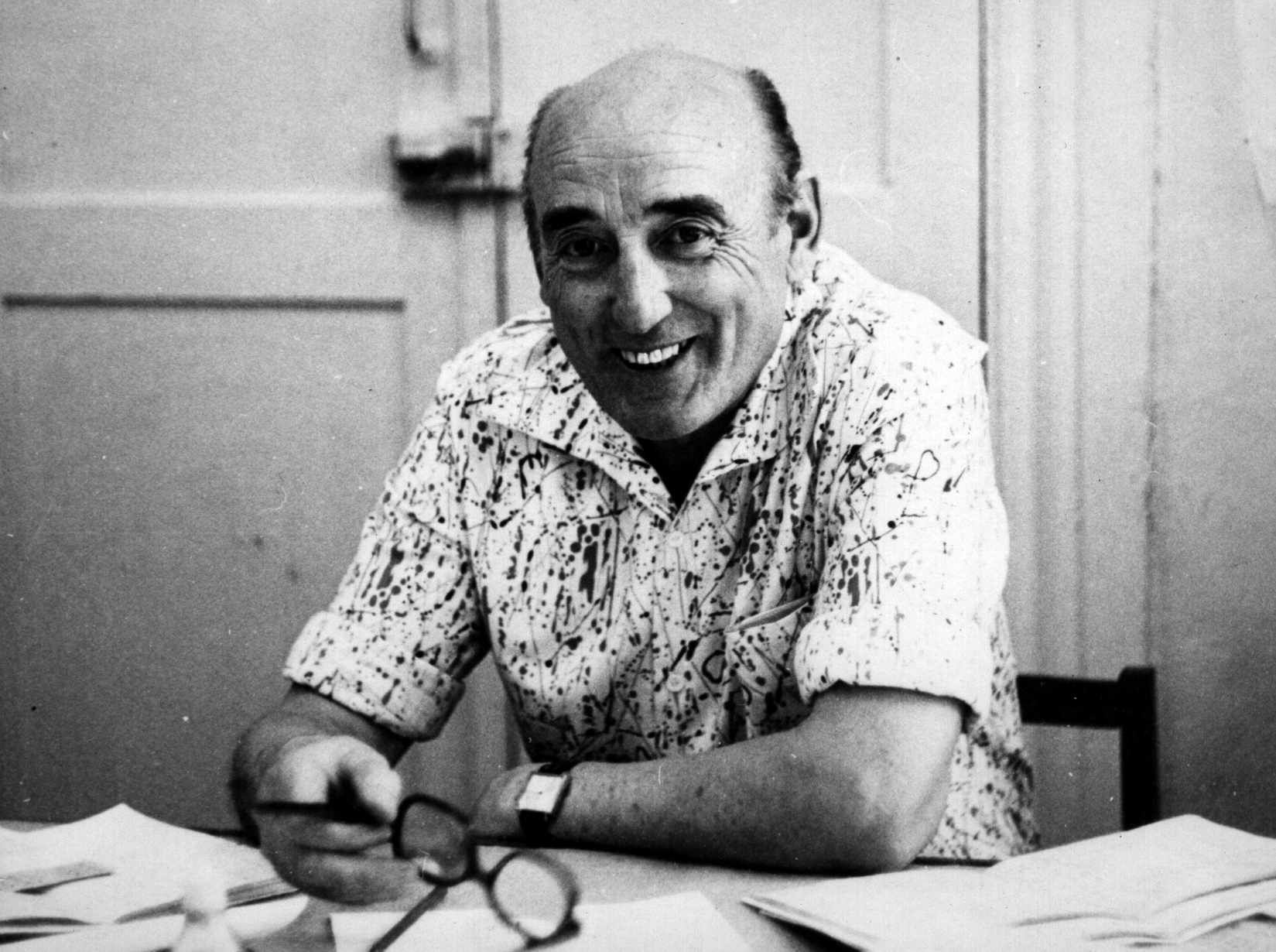
- Working at the Institute of Geography, 1980s
- Born: 25 January 1922; Shadrinsk, Kurgan Oblast, USSR
- Died: 17 June 2017 (aged 95); Almaty, Kazakhstan
- Education: Ural State University
- Known for: Glaciology
- Awards: Order of the Patriotic War 2nd Class (2)
- Scientific career
- Fields: Glaciology
- Workplaces: Institute of Geography, The Kazakh SSR

Konstantin Grigorievich Makarevich (25 January 1922 – 17 June 2017) was a Soviet and Kazakhstani glaciologist. He made a significant scientific contribution to the development and popularization of glaciology. He headed the Soviet glaciological expedition on the Tuyuksu glacier from 1956 to 1992 and was the founder of the Tuyuksu glaciological station. For more than 20 years, he was as an official representative of the Soviet Union in the World Glacier Monitoring Service (WGMS). He authored more than 200 scientific articles, monographs, regional and autobiographical books, and essays. Two glaciers and two passes in the Trans-Ili and Dzhungarian Alatau are named after him. He was a veteran of World War II, an order-bearer.

== Biography ==
He was born in Shadrinsk, Kurgan Oblast. His father worked as the chief technologist of the food industry and engaged in foreign trade deliveries, and his mother worked as an accountant-economist. A few years later, the family moved to Sverdlovsk (now Yekaterinburg). He studied at the city school, then in the mining and metallurgical technical school, specializing in mineral processing. There, he actively engaged in various sports and participated in the tourist-mountaineering club.

The completion of the technical school was interrupted by conscription to the army in October 1941. Army training took place in the 20th Airborne Brigade on the territory of the Volga German Autonomous Soviet Socialist Republic (VGASSR). Throughout the war, he passed his way from chemist to division commander. He engaged in the battle of Moscow, the Battle of Kursk, the Battle of Königsberg. He fought through Belarus, Poland, and East Prussia, and finished capturing Königsberg in the rank of lieutenant. He participated in 13 raids on maintaining divisional reconnaissance groups. He was awarded two Orders of the Red Star, two Second Class Orders of the Patriotic War, as well as other medals, such as "For the Capture of Königsberg". The book of memoirs regarding the participation in the war was published in 2015, timed to coincide with the 70th anniversary of the Great Victory in the World War II

After demobilization in 1946, he continued studies at the Ural State University in Sverdlovsk. After graduation, he received a proposal to continue his studies at the Academy of Sciences of the Kazakh SSR. In March, 1956 he defended his Ph.D. thesis on the evaluation of melted waters of glaciers in the Lepsy River basin, calculating for the first time the regime characteristics of glaciers according to observations of the temperature regime at mountain weather stations.

From 1965 to 1974, he headed a research project within International Hydrological Decade (IHD) aimed at the mountain-glacial basin of Tien-Shan. Throughout more than 40 years, he headed expeditions and the research within the frames of the various International Geophysical Projects and Programs of Glacier Fluctuations. In the autumn of 1992, he took part in the glacial expedition for the last time. In 2007, he published a book, "Methodological Aspects of Studies of Mass balance and Fluctuations of Mountain Glaciers", which is a short guide to the establishment and conduction of field observations and laboratory analysis of data. Until 2015, when he was 94, he worked as a lead researcher at the Institute of Geography of the Ministry of Education and Science of the Republic of Kazakhstan.

He was married to Valentina Georgievna Starchenko for 66 years, and they had two children.

He died on 17 June 2017 at the age of 96. He was buried in the city cemetery on Ryskulov Avenue in Almaty, Kazakhstan.

=== Mountaineering activity ===
Makarevich did more than thirty ascents, eight of which were conquered for the first time, remaining at that time as a "white spots" on topographic maps. The first experience of climbing under the alpine camp "Tsvetmet" (now "Talgar") to the top of the Jubilee of 1B grade was committed in 1940, for which he was awarded the badge "Mountaineer of the USSR of I grade". In 1946, after demobilization, he received an invitation to the position of an intern-instructor from the head of the alpcamp "Tsvetmet". At the end of the mountaineering season every year he returned to Sverdlovsk for studies from 1948 to 1952. During this time he made numerous ascents of different grade.

In Alma-Ata (Almaty), he established contacts with the Sector of Geography of the Academy of Sciences of the Kazakh SSR (now the Geography Institute of the Ministry of Education and Science of the Republic of Kazakhstan). The first practical knowledge in glaciology was obtained during ascents. Later, on the basis of the camp "Talgar" (former Tsvetmet), two sports&scientific expeditions were organized and conducted: one to the upper reaches of the Issyk Gorge (1950), the other to the glaciers of Right Talgar and Zharsaya (1952). In 1950 a number of ascents on nameless peaks were conducted led by Makarevich, where one of the peaks was given the name of "Peak of Eighteen" in honor of the first eighteen pioneers, bearing this name until 1952, renamed "Kokbulak Peak".

The results of the expeditions were published in two articles called "Conquered Peaks" for 1951 and 1953, published in Moscow. For climbing the Talgar peak from the south side in 1951 (Talgar pass 5A grade) received the badge "Mountaineer of the USSR II stage". He worked as an instructor of mountaineering in the alpinist camp from 1946 to 1955.

=== Research activities ===
For more than 40 years of research, he had been primarily concerned with studying the mass balance of glaciers, considering this aspect to be the most important direction in glaciology. He also believed that the study of glaciers is an important aspect of the national security of the country, being one of the strategic resources of fresh water in arid territories.

Within the framework of the International Geophysical Year 1957-1958 (IGY) was an active initiator of the inclusion of glaciological research and the Glaciology Sector of the Institute of Geography among the institutions for the international exchange of observational data and their publications within the IGY. In the person of the administrative and scientific leader, he formed a research group consisting of 35 people. In 1962 the research on the Tuyuksu glacier was described in the collection "General Description of Research. Trans-Ili Alatau".

He believed that the glacier mass balance is closely related to the height of the glacier feeding boundary, on the basis of which he calculated the characteristics of glaciers and predicted the influence of climatic factors on the glaciation of the Tien Shan. Based on the long-term data on accumulation, ablation and the glacier mass balance, the most important conclusion was made about the systematic reduction of glaciers, as well as the potential danger of accelerating the process of melting due to increasing anthropogenic impact. Thus, according to observations from 1957, the glacier has lost about 57 million m3 of ice. As of 2009, according to Makarevich's calculations, over 50 years the glacier retreated by 700 meters, and if the rate of ablation continues, the glacier may disappear after 120 years. He was interested in improving the efficiency of observations on the glacier regime. He also paid much attention to the problems of spatial changes in glaciers, internal and external mass transfer, developed a radio-geodetic method of obtaining "quick data" on the change rates in the glacier mass . Studied surging glaciers, such as Korzhenevsky, Shokalsky, Kroshka, Kassin, Constitution, Southern Talgar in the mountain range of the Trans-Ili Alatau.

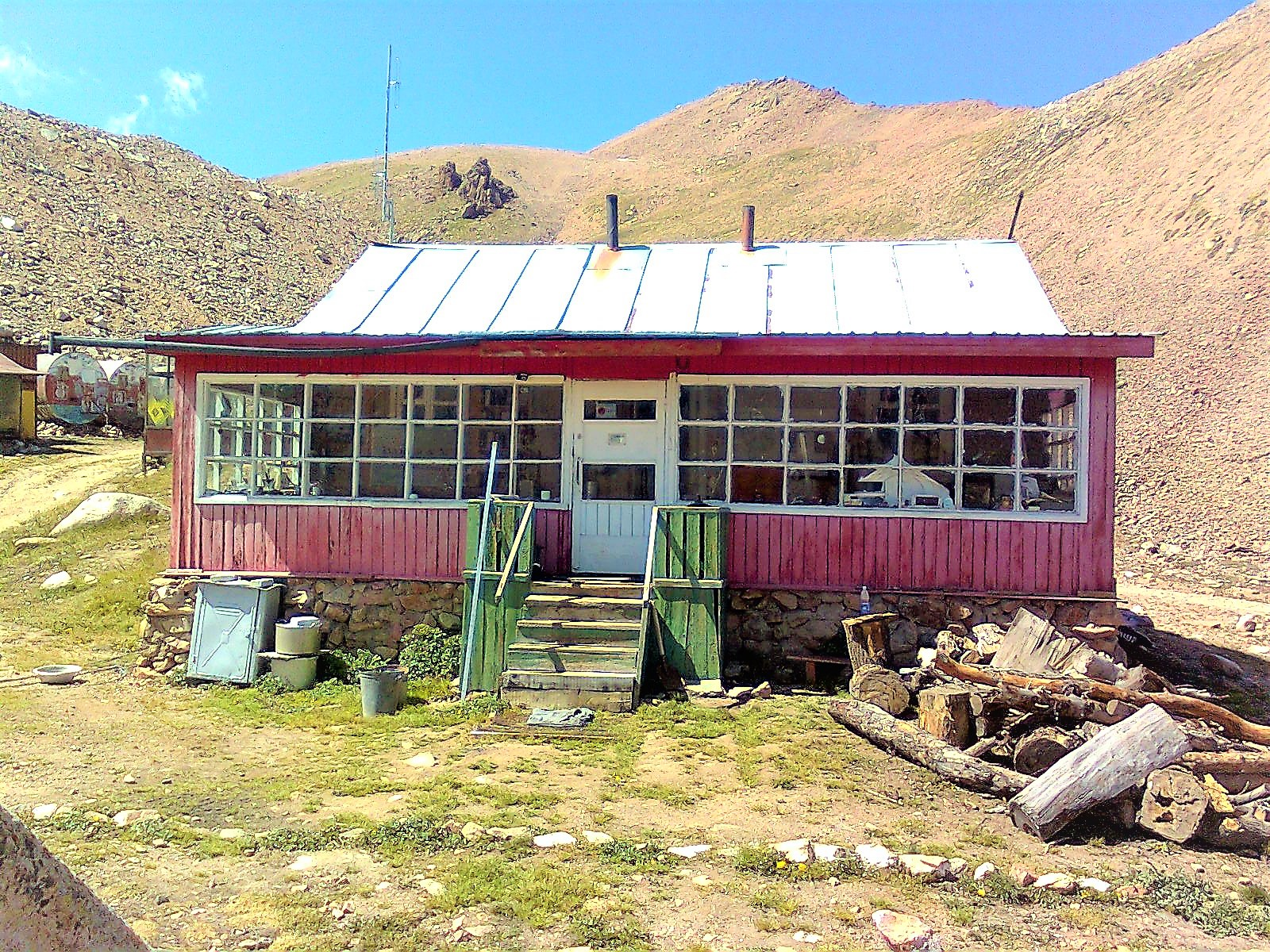
Tuyuksu Station Т1

In the 1970s actively participated in the research of thermophysical properties of artificially created ice on the high-mountain skating rink "Medeu". The aim of the study was the possibility of maintaining a certain temperature of ice to ensure optimal glide in changing weather conditions, as well as the effect of solar radiation and the thermal state of artificial ice. He is one of the authors of the corresponded patent.

Particular attention was paid to the glacier Central Tuyuksu, which became a representative glacier of the World Glacier Monitoring Service for the Central Asian region. Thanks to his efforts, constant research on the Central Tuyuksu Glacier has been carried out since 1956 to the present. The series "Fluctuations of Glaciers", issued every 5 years, are available on the World Glacier Monitoring Service website. The website also offers "Glacier Mass Balance Bulletin" as well as the "Global Glacier Change Bulletin", published biennially.

Two glaciers are named after him for the valuable contribution to the development and popularization of glaciology: one is in the Trans-Ili Alatau (in the upper reaches of the Kaskelen River), the other is in the Dzhungarian Alatau (in the Aksu River basin), and two passes in the Trans-Ili (4000 m.) and Dzungarian Alatau (3850 m, in the upper reaches of the Kory river of Karatal).

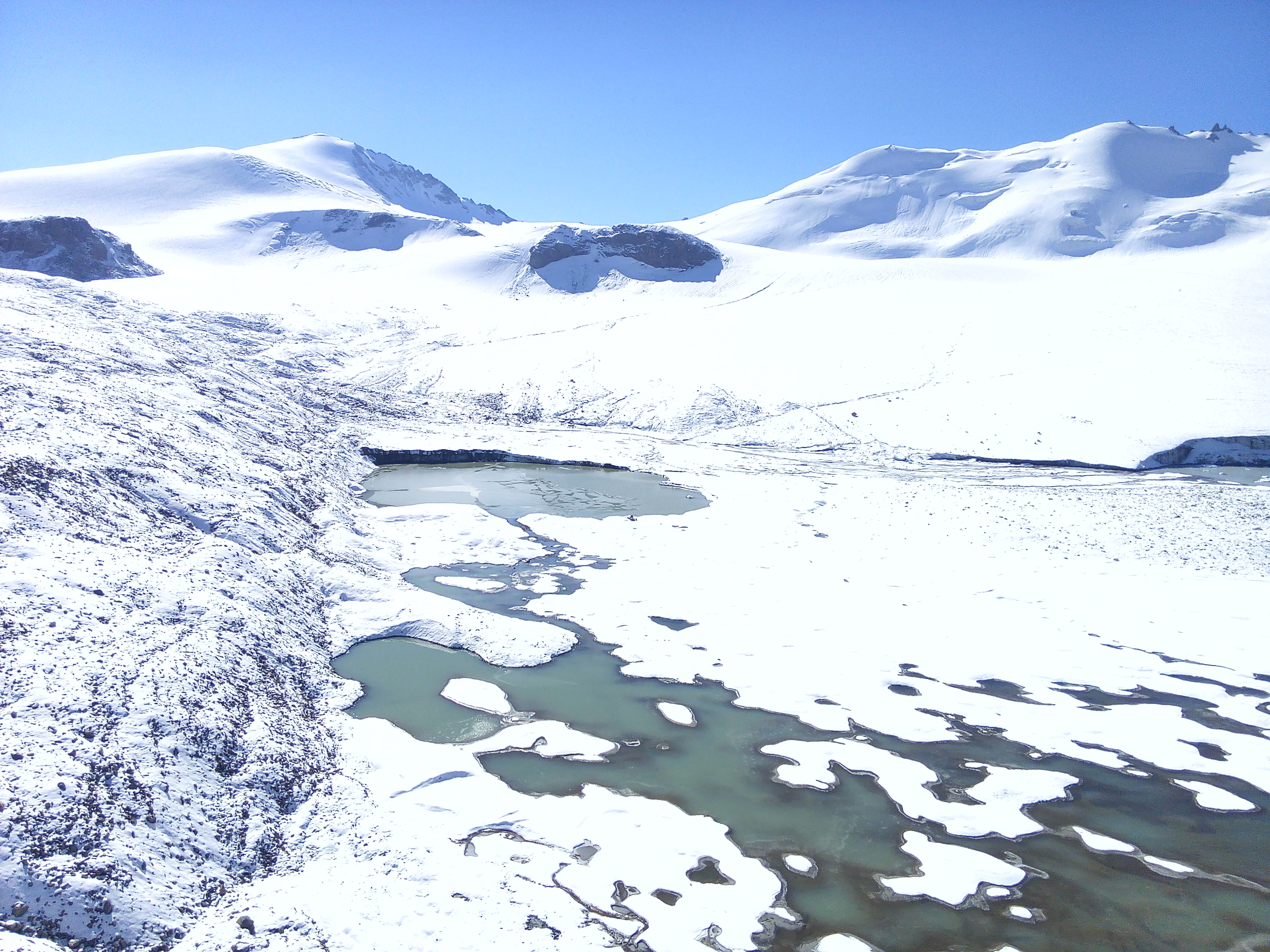
Makarevich glacier in Kaskelen pass, Trans-Ili Alatau, 2016

==== Scientific and public activities in the period from 1956 to 1992 ====
Sources:

- For 20 years represented the Soviet Union in the World Glacier Monitoring Service (WGMS);
- Member of the Glaciology Section and Chairman of the Working Group on Glacier Fluctuations and member of the Working Group on IGY;
- Member of the Glaciological Association of the CIS; Editor of collections on geography and glaciology of Kazakhstan;
- Member of the editorial board of the scientific journal "Materials of Glaciological Studies";
- Member of the editorial board of the Atlas of the Kazakh SSR, vol. 1 "Natural conditions and resources";
- Member of the editorial board of the Atlas of the world's snow and ice resources under the section "Fluctuations of glaciers";
- Member of the Academic Council of the Institute of Geography of the Academy of Sciences of the Kazakh SSR;
- Actively participated in the preparation of the rationale for the transformation of the Department of Geography into the Institute of Geography of the Academy of Sciences of the Kazakh SSR;
- Member of the Scientific and Technical Council of the Kazakh Service for flood protection;
- Organizer of several All-Union and International symposiums and seminars on glaciology in Almaty (Almaty);
- Participant of international symposiums and workshops in the USSR, France, England, Switzerland, China, Russia.

=== Popular science and literary activity ===
One of the most significant popular science works was an autobiographical book - "Life dedicated to glaciers" (rus. Zhizn', posvyashchennaya lednikam) published in 2004, the second edition was published in 2016. Also one of the last popular science works was "Photoatlas of glaciers of the Ile Alatau (Trans-Ili Alatau, Northern Tien Shan)", published in 2011 and undergone 3 reissues, containing retrospective photographs of glaciers of the Tien Shan, reflecting its state of glaciation in this region since the beginning of the XX century. Some of Makarevich's photographs are published in the booklet dedicated to the project "The Sound of the Glacier" (German: "Gletschermusik", Russian: "Музыка Ледника").

In addition to his popular science works, he wrote memoirs "Memoirs on Participation in the World War II 1941-1945" (rus. Ob uchastii v Velikoy Otechestvennoy Voyne 1941–1945). In 2001 he wrote an essay book about life in Germany called "Ah, Berlin", a year later he released a revised version called "Berlin through the eyes of a traveler" (rus. Berlin glazami puteshestvennika) in co-authorship with his daughter - Alissa Uvarova.

In 2014, a book was published, entitled "the Life of Tuyuksu Glacier. Past, Present and Future" (rus. Zhizn' lednika Tuyuksu. Proshloye, nastoyashcheye i budushcheye), which reflects the data of a half-century observations on the glacier, its regime, changes in morphometric parameters, hydrological regime and external and internal mass transfer, as well as recreational assessment of the glacial basin.

== Awards ==
Orders:

- two "Orders of the Patriotic War II degree № 336670", April 11, 1945; No. 1757093, April 6, 1985
- two "Orders of the Red Star No. 836505, September" 3, 1944; No. 2510201, April 9, 1945,

Medals:

- Medal "10 years of Astana" No. 11719
- Jubilee medal "For valorous work. In commemoration of the 100th anniversary of the birth of Vladimir Ilich Lenin", June 10, 1970
- Medal "For the victory over Germany in the Great Patriotic War of 1941-1945"
- Jubilee medal "70 years of Victory in the Great Patriotic War 1941-1945", April 2, 2015
- Jubilee medal "70 years of the Battle for Kursk"
- Medal "For the Capture of Königsberg"
- Medal "Veteran of Labor", December 2, 1983
- The winner of the socialist competition in 1973, on behalf of the Presidium of the Academy of Sciences of the Kazakh SSR
- "Mountaineer of the USSR I stage", 1940
- "Mountaineer of the USSR II stage", 1951
- Badge "25 years of victory in the Great Patriotic War"
- Badge "Frontman of 1941-1945"

== Bibliography ==
For his research and literary activity he published more than 200 scientific publications, monographs, essays and books.
