= Serhiy Chebotaryov =

Ukrainian footballer

Serhiy Chebotaryev
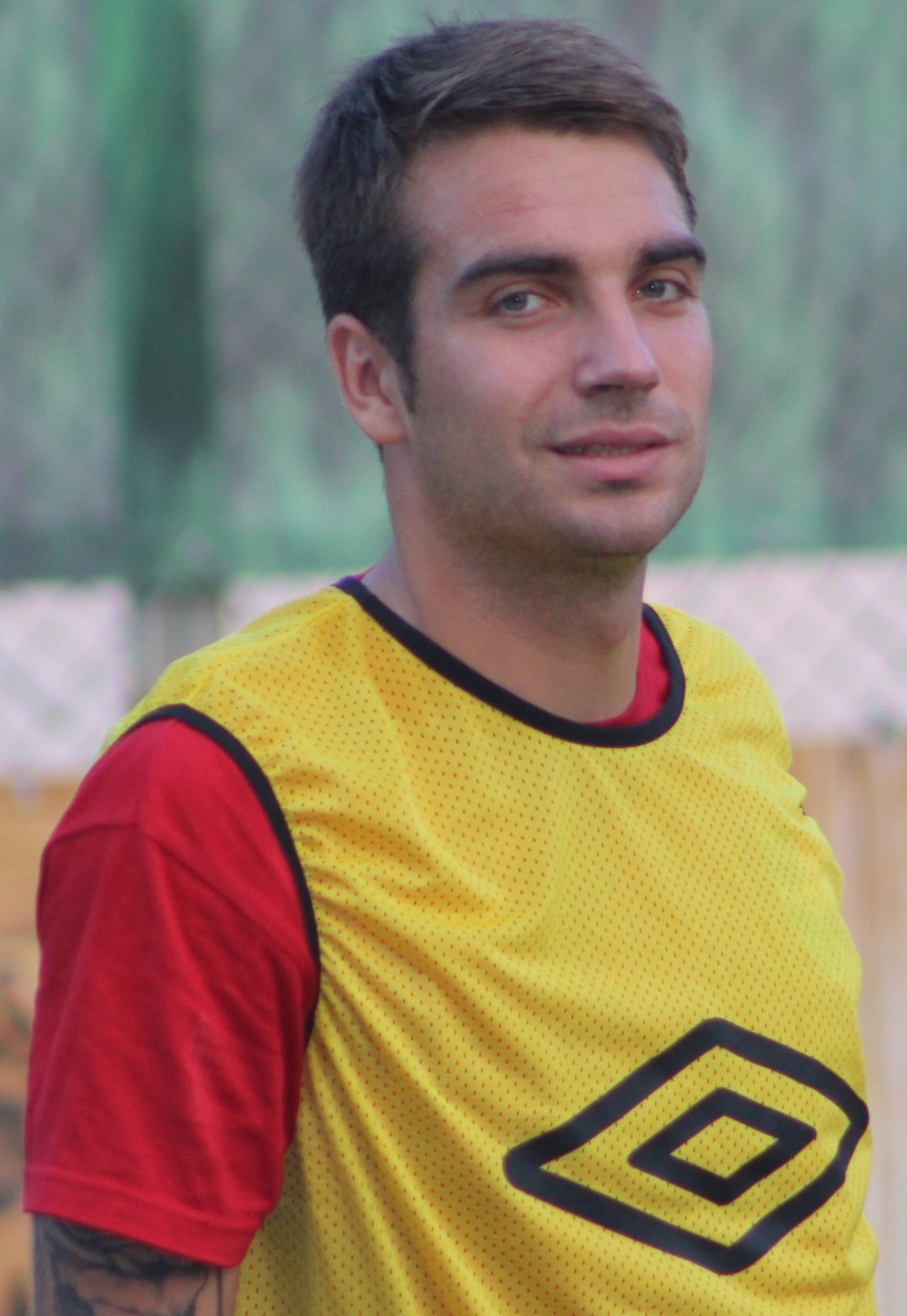

Personal information
- Full name: Serhiy Yuriyovych Chebotaryev
- Date of birth: 26 March 1991 (age 35)
- Place of birth: Dnipropetrovsk, Ukrainian SSR
- Height: 1.78 m (5 ft 10 in)
- Position: Defender

Team information
- Current team: Korsnäs FF
- Number: 15

Youth career
- 2004–2008: Dnipro Dnipropetrovsk

Senior career*
Years	Team	Apps	(Gls)
2008–2009	Dnipro Dnipropetrovsk	0	(0)
2009	Kryvbas Kryvyi Rih	0	(0)
2010	Naftovyk-Ukrnafta Okhtyrka	0	(0)
2010–2011	Sevastopol	0	(0)
2011	→ Iskra-Stal Rîbniţa (loan)	23	(2)
2012	Dynamo Khmelnytskyi	2	(0)
2013–2014	Slavutych Cherkasy	40	(5)
2014	Hirnyk Kryvyi Rih	1	(0)
2015	Kafa Feodosia	13	(5)
2016	Zugdidi	8	(0)
2016	Kafa Feodosia	14	(4)
2017	Bukovyna Chernivtsi	13	(1)
2018	Khujand		
2018	Dnipro 1918		
2019	Veres Rivne	0	(0)
2019–	Korsnäs FF	76	(47)
- * Club domestic league appearances and goals as of 21:16, 17 June 2023 (UTC)

Serhiy Chebotaryev (Ukrainian: Сергій Юрійович Чеботарьов; born 26 March 1991) is a professional Ukrainian football defender who plays for Swedish club Korsnäs FF.

== Career ==
Chebotaryev is a product of FC Dnipro Youth Sportive School. His first trainers were Volodymyr Stryzhevskyi and Volodymyr Knysh.

After playing for Ukrainian clubs in the different levels, with a short time in Moldova, in January 2016 he signed a contract with Georgian club FC Zugdidi from the Umaglesi Liga.

In August 2018, Chebotaryev joined FK Dnipro 1918. In February 2019, he signed a deal with Veres Rivne. However, a few days later, his contract was terminated, because the club had found out that Chebotaryev had played in the Crimean Premier League in 2016.

In May 2019, Chebotaryov moved to Finnish club Korsnäs FF.
