= Yuriy Shturko =

Ukrainian footballer

Personal information
- Full name: Yuriy Yuriyovych Shturko
- Date of birth: 8 October 1984 (age 42)
- Place of birth: Kryvyi Rih, Ukrainian SSR
- Height: 1.80 m (5 ft 11 in)
- Position: Striker

Youth career
- 1998: SC Odesa
- 1998–2001: Kryvbas Kryvyi Rih

Senior career*
Years	Team	Apps	(Gls)
2002–2004	Krystal Kherson	44	(1)
2004–2005	Zirka Kirovohrad	17	(3)
2005–2006	Kryvbas-2 Kryvyi Rih	28	(7)
2006	Volyn Lutsk	1	(0)
2006–2007	Mykolaiv	31	(2)
2007–2009	Dnister Ovidiopol	69	(13)
2009–2010	Kryvbas Kryvyi Rih	17	(1)
2010–2011	Zakarpattia Uzhhorod	26	(2)
2011–2015	Metalurh Zaporizhzhia	61	(11)
- * Club domestic league appearances and goals as of 13 March 2014

Yuriy Yuriyovych Shturko (Ukrainian: Юрій Юрійович Штурко; born 8 October 1984) is a Ukrainian former professional footballer.
