= 2012–13 FC Dynamo Kyiv season =

Dynamo Kyiv
2012–13 season
- Chairman: Ihor Surkis
- Manager: Oleh Blokhin
- Stadium: Olimpiysky National Sports Complex
- Premier League: 3rd
- Ukrainian Cup: Round of 32
- Champions League: Group stage
- Europa League: Round of 32
- Top goalscorer: League: Brown Ideye (17); All: Brown Ideye (21)
- Highest home attendance: 66,837 vs Shakhtar; 7 April 2013
- Lowest home attendance: 12,879 vs Vorskla; 17 March 2013
- Average home league attendance: 32,362
Home colours	Away colours

The 2012–13 season was Dynamo's 22nd Ukrainian Premier League season, and their third season under manager Yuri Semin. Yuri Semin was sacked 24 September 2012 after losing by Dynamo to principal rivals FC Shakhtar Donetsk in the Ukrainian Cup. On 25 September 2012, Oleh Blokhin was appointed new manager. During the season, Dynamo Kyiv competed in the Ukrainian Premier League, Ukrainian Cup and in the UEFA Champions League.

== Current squad ==
Squad is given according to the club's official website. Note: Flags indicate national team as defined under FIFA eligibility rules; some limited exceptions apply. Players may hold more than one non-FIFA nationality.

No.	Pos.	Nation	Player
1	GK	UKR	Oleksandr Shovkovskyi (captain)
2	DF	BRA	Danilo Silva
3	DF	UKR	Yevhen Selin
4	MF	POR	Miguel Veloso
8	MF	UKR	Oleksandr Aliyev
9	MF	UKR	Roman Bezus
10	FW	UKR	Andriy Yarmolenko
11	FW	NGR	Brown Ideye
13	MF	SUI	Admir Mehmedi
15	FW	ARG	Marco Ruben
16	MF	UKR	Serhiy Sydorchuk
17	DF	UKR	Taras Mykhalyk (vice-captain)
19	MF	UKR	Denys Harmash
20	MF	UKR	Oleh Husyev (vice-captain)

No.	Pos.	Nation	Player
21	MF	CRO	Niko Kranjčar
22	FW	UKR	Artem Kravets
24	DF	CRO	Domagoj Vida
25	MF	NGR	Lukman Haruna
26	DF	UKR	Serhiy Lyulka
33	DF	NGR	Taye Taiwo (on loan from Milan)
34	DF	UKR	Yevhen Khacheridi
35	GK	UKR	Maksym Koval
70	FW	ESP	Lucas (on loan from Karpaty Lviv)
71	GK	UKR	Denys Boyko
77	MF	UKR	Andriy Tsurikov
99	MF	BRA	Dudu
—	FW	UKR	Artem Milevskyi

=== Out on loan ===
Note: Flags indicate national team as defined under FIFA eligibility rules; some limited exceptions apply. Players may hold more than one non-FIFA nationality.

No.	Pos.	Nation	Player
—	DF	BRA	Betão (at Evian)
—	DF	UKR	Temur Partsvaniya (at Metalurh Zaporizhya)
—	DF	UKR	Taras Pinchuk (at Zirka Kirovohrad)
—	DF	MKD	Goran Popov (at West Bromwich Albion)
—	MF	UKR	Serhiy Rybalka (at Slovan Liberec)
—	MF	ARG	Facundo Bertoglio (at Grêmio)
—	MF	UKR	Andriy Bohdanov (at Arsenal Kyiv)
—	MF	UKR	Yevhen Makarenko (at Hoverla Uzhhorod)

No.	Pos.	Nation	Player
—	MF	SRB	Miloš Ninković (at Evian)
—	MF	UKR	Kyrylo Petrov (at Hoverla Uzhhorod)
—	MF	BRA	Raffael (at Schalke 04)
—	MF	UKR	Oleksandr Vasylyev (at Dnipro Dnipropetrovsk)
—	MF	CRO	Ognjen Vukojević (at Spartak Moscow)
—	MF	NGR	Ayila Yussuf (at Orduspor)
—	FW	COL	Andrés Escobar (at Deportivo Cali)

=== Managerial changes ===
Team	Outgoing head coach	Manner of departure	Date of vacancy	Table	Incoming head coach	Date of appointment
Dynamo Kyiv	(Russia) Yuri Syomin	Sacked	September 24	3rd	(Ukraine) Oleh Blokhin	September 25

== Competitions ==
=== Ukrainian Premier League ===
==== League table ====
Pos	Team	Pld	W	D	L	GF	GA	GD	Pts	Qualification or relegation
1	Shakhtar Donetsk (C)	30	25	4	1	82	18	+64	79	Qualification for the Champions League group stage
2	Metalist Kharkiv	30	20	6	4	59	25	+34	66	Qualification for the Champions League third qualifying round
3	Dynamo Kyiv	30	20	2	8	55	23	+32	62	Qualification for the Europa League play-off round
4	Dnipro Dnipropetrovsk	30	16	8	6	54	27	+27	56	Qualification for the Europa League play-off round
5	Metalurh Donetsk	30	14	7	9	45	35	+10	49	Qualification for the Europa League third qualifying round

Source: uafootball.net.ua
Rules for classification: 1st points; 2nd goal difference; 3rd goals scored; 4th head-to-head points; 5th head-to-head goal difference; 6th head-to-head goals scored; 7th fair play; 8th draw (Regulation, p.52-53).
(C) Champions

==== Results summary ====
Overall								Home						Away					
Pld	W	D	L	GF	GA	GD	Pts	W	D	L	GF	GA	GD	W	D	L	GF	GA	GD
30	20	2	8	55	23	+32	62	12	1	2	30	9	+21	8	1	6	25	14	+11

Last updated: 17 March 2013.
Source: Soccerway

==== Results by round ====
Round	1	2	3	4	5	6	7	8	9	10	11	12	13	14	15	16	17	18	19	20	21	22	23	24	25	26	27	28	29	30
Ground	H	A	H	A	H	A	H	A	H	H	A	H	A	H	A	A	H	A	H	A	H	A	H	A	A	H	A	H	A	H
Result	W	W	W	W	W	L	W	L	W	W	L	L	D	W	W	L	W	W	D	W	W	W	L	W	W	W	L	W	L	W
Position	6	5	3	2	2	2	2	3	3	2	3	3	3	3	3	3	3	3	4	4	3	2	3	3	3	2	3	3	3	3

Source: Soccerway
A = Away; H = Home; W = Win; D = Draw; L = Loss

==== Matches ====
14 July 2012 Match 1	Dynamo	1–0	Metalurh Donetsk	Kyiv
19:30	Ideye 90+2'	Summary		Stadium: NSC Olimpiyskiy; Attendance: 32,850; Referee: Vitaliy Hodulyan

22 July 2012 Match 2	Arsenal	0–1	Dynamo	Kyiv
19:30	Stargorodsky (yellow card) 77' (yellow-red card) 78'	Summary	Ideye 3'	Stadium: Dynamo Stadium; Attendance: 11,617; Referee: Anatoliy Zhabchenko

27 July 2012 Match 3	Dynamo	3–1	Hoverla	Kyiv
19:00	Husyev 30'; Ideye 86', 90+2'	Summary	Kosyrin 20'	Stadium: NSC Olimpiyskiy; Attendance: 20,153; Referee: Yuri Hrysio

3 August 2012 Match 4	Kryvbas	0–1	Dynamo	Kryvyi Rih
19:00		Summary	Yarmolenko 86'	Stadium: Metalurh Stadium; Attendance: 7,800; Referee: Anatoliy Abdula

12 August 2012 Match 5	Dynamo	4–1	Volyn	Kyiv
19:00	Kranjčar 22', 49'; Ideye 29', 90+1'	Summary	Ramon 34'	Stadium: NSC Olimpiyskiy; Attendance: 23,122; Referee: Yuri Mozharovskyi

18 August 2012 Match 6	Vorskla	1–0	Dynamo	Poltava
18:30	Hromov 25'	Summary		Stadium: Vorskla Stadium; Attendance: 10,500; Referee: Kostiantyn Trukhanov

25 August 2012 Match 7	Dynamo	2–0	Chornomorets	Kyiv
19:30	Ninković 23'; Ideye 72'	Summary		Stadium: NSC Olimpiyskiy; Attendance: 20,101; Referee: Andriy Kuzmin

2 September 2012 Match 8	Shakhtar	3–1	Dynamo	Donetsk
19:30	Kucher 19', 62'; Luiz Adriano 81'	Summary	Yarmolenko 45'	Stadium: Donbas Arena; Attendance: 53,423; Referee: Anatoliy Abdula

14 September 2012 Match 9	Dynamo	3–1	Karpaty	Kyiv
19:00	Ideye 33'; Kranjčar 57', 63'	Summary	Lucas 73' (pen.)	Stadium: NSC Olimpiyskiy; Attendance: 27,604; Referee: Vitaliy Hodulyan

28 September 2012 Match 10	Dynamo	1–0	Zorya	Kyiv
17:30	Raffael 81'	Summary		Stadium: NSC Olimpiyskiy; Attendance: 21,714; Referee: Yaroslav Kozyk

7 October 2012 Match 11	Dnipro	2–1	Dynamo	Dnipropetrovsk
17:30	Seleznyov 12'; Matheus 83'	Summary	Veloso 90+4'	Stadium: Dnipro Arena; Attendance: 30,093; Referee: Yuri Moseichuk

20 October 2012 Match 12	Dynamo	1–3	Metalist	Kyiv
19:30	Taiwo (yellow card) 51'; Vukojević (yellow card) 55'; Yarmolenko 59', (yellow card) 70'; Mykhalyk (yellow card) 68' (yellow-red card) 88'; Milevskyi (yellow card) 90+4'	Summary	Taison 34', (yellow card) 55'; Cleiton Xavier 52' (pen.); Edmar (yellow card) 69'; Cristaldo (yellow card) 78' (yellow-red card) 86'; Torres 90+3'	Stadium: NSC Olimpiyskiy; Attendance: 40,547; Referee: Victor Shvetsov

28 October 2012 Match 13	Illichivets	0–0	Dynamo	Mariupol
16:00	Okriashvili (yellow card) 90+4'	Summary	Betão (yellow card) 76'; Vukojević (yellow card) 80'	Stadium: Illichivets Stadium; Attendance: 11,200; Referee: Vitaliy Godulyan

3 November 2012 Match 14	Dynamo	2–0	Tavriya	Kyiv
17:30	Vukojević (yellow card) 3'; Ruben 45+1'; Mehmedi (yellow card) 56'; Mykhalyk 61'	Summary	Célio (yellow card) 19'; Shynder (yellow card) 57'	Stadium: NSC Olimpiyskiy; Attendance: 20,304; Referee: Olexander Derdo

10 November 2012 Match 15	Metalurh Zaporizhya	0–5	Dynamo	Zaporizhya
16:00	Mohammed Otman (yellow card) 45+1'; Mohammed Ashraf Khalfaoui (yellow card) 58'; Opanasenko (yellow card) 90+3'	Summary	Veloso 44'; Harmash 51'; Ideye 64', 74'; Yarmolenko 87'	Stadium: Slavutych-Arena; Attendance: 9,000; Referee: O.Ivanov

17 November 2012 Match 16	Metalurh Donetsk	1–0	Dynamo	Donetsk
18:30	Dimitrov 71'	Summary	Veloso (yellow card) 44'; Betão (yellow card) 80'	Stadium: Metalurh Stadium; Attendance: 2,500; Referee: Artem Zhabchenko

25 November 2012 Match 17	Dynamo	4–0	Arsenal	Kyiv
17:00	Khacheridi 40', (yellow card) 51'; Ideye 44', 90'; Husyev 88'	Summary	Starhorodskyi (yellow card) 67'; Matoukou (yellow card) 87'	Stadium: NSC Olimpiyskiy; Attendance: 20,815; Referee: Yuri Mozharovskiy

30 November 2012 Match 18	Hoverla	2–4	Dynamo	Uzhhorod
16:00	Balafas 12', (yellow card) 78' (yellow-red card) 90'; Yedigaryan (yellow card) 23'; Raičević 61'	Summary	Haruna 14', (yellow card) 45'; Ideye 18'; Miguel Veloso (yellow card) 20'; Dudu 45+2', (yellow card) 73'; Yarmolenko 72'; Bohdanov (yellow card) 75' (yellow-red card) 89'	Stadium: Avanhard Stadium; Attendance: 7,000; Referee: Olexander Derdo

3 March 2013 Match 19	Dynamo	1–1	Kryvbas	Kyiv
19:30	Haruna 47'; Husyev (yellow card) 55'; Veloso (yellow card) 80'	Summary	Dedechko (yellow card) 16'; Matič (yellow card) 43'; Pryyomov 72'; Borovyk (yellow card) 77'; Serdyuk (yellow card) 90+1'	Stadium: NSC Olimpiyskiy; Attendance: 20,594; Referee: Vitaliy Godulyan

10 March 2013 Match 20	Volyn	0–2	Dynamo	Lutsk
17:30	Bicfalvi (yellow card) 37'; Pryndeta (yellow card) 48'; Izvoranu (yellow card) 53'; Subotić (yellow card) 77'	Summary	Yarmolenko 51', (yellow card) 65'; Garmash 70'; Khacheridi (yellow card) 77'; Haruna (yellow card) 84'	Stadium: Avanhard Stadium; Attendance: 7,500; Referee: Yuri Mozharovskiy

17 March 2013 Match 21	Dynamo	1–0	Vorskla	Kyiv
17:30	Vida 5'; Bezus (yellow card) 23'	Summary	Perduta (yellow card) 14'; Rebenok (yellow card) 31'; Tkachuk (yellow card) 47'; Sapay (yellow card) 57'	Stadium: NSC Olimpiyskiy; Attendance: 12,879; Referee: Yuriy Moseychuk

31 March 2013 Match 22	Chornomorets	0–2	Dynamo	Odesa
15:00	Matos (yellow card) 68'	Summary	Husyev 47'; Yarmolenko 72'	Stadium: Chornomorets Stadium; Attendance: 34,164; Referee: Anatoliy Abdula

7 April 2013 Match 23	Dynamo	1–2	Shakhtar	Kyiv
19:30	Yarmolenko 10'	Summary	Mkhitaryan 44', 75'; Rakitskiy (yellow card) 28' (yellow-red card) 90'	Stadium: NSC Olimpiyskiy; Attendance: 66,837; Referee: Vitaliy Hodulyan

13 April 2013 Match 24	Karpaty	0–1	Dynamo	Lviv
17:30		Summary	Ideye 64'; Mykhalyk (yellow card) 15' (yellow-red card) 76'	Stadium: Ukraina Stadium; Attendance: 25,850; Referee: Yaroslav Kozyk

20 April 2013 Match 25	Zorya	0–5	Dynamo	Luhansk
18:30		Summary	Yarmolenko 29'; Ideye 39', 80'; Bezus 88'; Husyev 90+3' (pen.)	Stadium: Avanhard Stadium; Attendance: 20,200; Referee: Viktor Shvetsov

27 April 2013 Match 26	Dynamo	2–0	Dnipro	Kyiv
19:30	Haruna 9', 45+1'	Summary	Mandzyuk (yellow card) 16' (yellow-red card) 75'	Stadium: NSC Olimpiyskiy; Attendance: 55,219; Referee: Anatoliy Zhabchenko

4 May 2013 Match 27	Metalist	2–0	Dynamo	Kharkiv
19:30	Dević 35'; Xavier 60'	Summary		Stadium: OSC Metalist; Attendance: 38,750; Referee: Yuri Mozharovskyi

11 May 2013 Match 28	Dynamo	1–0	Illichivets	Kyiv
19:30	Haruna 17'	Summary		Stadium: NSC Olimpiyskiy; Attendance: 17,498; Referee: Viktor Shvetsov

19 May 2013 Match 29	Tavriya	3–2	Dynamo	Simferopol
18:30	Nazarenko 4' (pen.); Gadzhiyev 51' (pen.); Né 68'	Summary	Ideye 27'; Yarmolenko 76'; Koval (red card) 48'	Stadium: RSC Lokomotiv; Attendance: 17,000; Referee: Vitaliy Hodulyan

26 May 2013 Match 30	Dynamo	3–0	Metalurh Zaporizhya	Kyiv
18:00	Yarmolenko 24'; Kravets 28', 60'	Summary		Stadium: NSC Olimpiyskiy; Attendance: 15,095; Referee: Yuri Vaks

=== Ukrainian Cup ===
23 September 2012 Round of 32	Shakhtar Donetsk	4–1	Dynamo	Donetsk
19:30	Luiz Adriano 22'; Teixeira 40'; Fernandinho 75'; Srna 83'	Summary	Taiwo 27'	Stadium: Donbas Arena; Attendance: 47,571; Referee: Anatoliy Zhabchenko (Simferopol)

=== UEFA Champions League ===
==== Third qualifying round ====
31 July 2012 First leg	Dynamo Kyiv (Ukraine)	2–1	(Netherlands) Feyenoord	Kyiv, Ukraine
20:00	Immers 56' (o.g.); Ideye 69'	Report	Schaken 49'	Stadium: Olimpiyskiy Stadium; Attendance: 53,612; Referee: Andre Marriner (England)

7 August 2012 Second leg	Feyenoord (Netherlands)	0–1 (1–3 agg.)	(Ukraine) Dynamo Kyiv	Rotterdam, Netherlands
21:00		Report	Ideye 90+6'	Stadium: De Kuip; Attendance: 45,000; Referee: (France) Antony Gautier (French Football Federation)

==== Play-off round ====
21 August 2012 First leg	Borussia Mönchengladbach (Germany)	1–3	(Ukraine) Dynamo Kyiv	Mönchengladbach, Germany
21:45	Ring 13'	Report	Mykhalyk 28'; Yarmolenko 36'; L. De Jong 81' (o.g.)	Stadium: Borussia-Park; Attendance: 45,075; Referee: Pedro Proença (Portugal)

29 August 2012 Second leg	Dynamo Kyiv (Ukraine)	1–2 (4–3 agg.)	(Germany) Borussia Mönchengladbach	Kyiv, Ukraine
21:45	Ideye 88'	Summary	Khacheridi 70' (o.g.); Arango 78'	Stadium: Olimpiyskiy Stadium; Attendance: 66,800; Referee: Craig Thomson (Scotland)

==== Group stage ====
Group A
Team	Pld	W	D	L	GF	GA	GD	Pts
(France) Paris Saint-Germain	6	5	0	1	14	3	+11	15
(Portugal) Porto	6	4	1	1	10	4	+6	13
(Ukraine) Dynamo Kyiv	6	1	2	3	6	10	−4	5
(Croatia) Dinamo Zagreb	6	0	1	5	1	14	−13	1

18 September 2012 1	Paris Saint-Germain (France)	4–1	(Ukraine) Dynamo Kyiv	Paris, France
21:45	Ibrahimović 19' (pen.); Silva 29'; Alex 32'; Pastore 90+1'	Report	Veloso 87'	Stadium: Parc des Princes; Attendance: 42,536; Referee: Björn Kuipers (Netherlands)

3 October 2012 2	Dynamo Kyiv (Ukraine)	2–0	(Croatia) Dinamo Zagreb	Kyiv, Ukraine
21:45	Husyev 3'; Pivarić 33' (o.g.)	Report		Stadium: NSC Olimpiysky; Attendance: 47,804; Referee: Martin Atkinson (England)

24 October 2012 3	Porto (Portugal)	3–2	(Ukraine) Dynamo Kyiv	Porto, Portugal
21:45	Varela 15'; Martínez 36', 78'	Report	Husyev 21'; Ideye 72'	Stadium: Estádio do Dragão; Attendance: 29,317; Referee: Pavel Královec (Czech Republic)

6 November 2012 4	Dynamo Kyiv (Ukraine)	0–0	(Portugal) Porto	Kyiv, Ukraine
21:45		Report		Stadium: NSC Olimpiysky; Attendance: 34,386; Referee: Alberto Undiano Mallenco (Spain)

21 November 2012 5	Dynamo Kyiv (Ukraine)	0–2	(France) Paris Saint-Germain	Kyiv, Ukraine
21:45		Report	Lavezzi 45', 52'	Stadium: Olimpiyskiy Stadium; Attendance: 36,712; Referee: Wolfgang Stark (Germany)

4 December 2012 6	Dinamo Zagreb (Croatia)	1–1	(Ukraine) Dynamo Kyiv	Zagreb, Croatia
21:45	Krstanović 90+5' (pen.)	Report	Yarmolenko 45+1'	Stadium: Stadion Maksimir; Attendance: 3,663; Referee: Stanislav Todorov (Bulgaria)

=== UEFA Europa League ===
==== Knockout phase ====
===== Round of 32 =====
14 February 2013 First leg	(Ukraine) Dynamo Kyiv	1–1	(France) Bordeaux	Kyiv
20:00	Haruna 20', (yellow card) 25'; Mykhalyk (yellow card) 55'; Bezus (yellow card) 64'	Summary	Obraniak 23'; Sertic (yellow card) 86'	Stadium: NSC Olimpiyskiy; Attendance: 24,953; Referee: (Romania) Alexandru Tudor

21 February 2013 Second leg	(France) Bordeaux	1–0 (2–1 agg.)	(Ukraine) Dynamo Kyiv	Bordeaux
21:00	Diabaté (yellow card) 29', (goal) 41'; Sertic (yellow card) 32'; Poko (yellow card) 77'	Summary	Khacheridi (yellow card) 39'; Kranjčar (yellow card) 70'	Stadium: Stade Chaban-Delmas; Attendance: 11,889; Referee: (Croatia) Ivan Bebek

== Squad statistics ==
=== Goalscorers ===
As of 1 June 2013

Place	Position	Nation	Number	Name	Premier League	Ukrainian Cup	Champions League	Total
1	FW	(Nigeria)	11	Brown Ideye	17	0	4	21
2	FW	(Ukraine)	9	Andriy Yarmolenko	11	0	2	13
3	MF	(Nigeria)	25	Lukman Haruna	5	0	1	6
3	MF	(Ukraine)	20	Oleh Husyev	4	0	2	6
5	MF	(Croatia)	21	Niko Kranjčar	4	0	0	4
6	MF	(Portugal)	4	Miguel Veloso	2	0	1	3
6				Own goal	0	0	3	3
8	MF	(Ukraine)	19	Denys Harmash	2	0	0	2
8	FW	(Ukraine)	22	Artem Kravets	2	0	0	2
8	DF	(Ukraine)	17	Taras Mykhalyk	1	0	1	2
11	MF	(Ukraine)	9	Roman Bezus	1	0	0	1
11	MF	(Brazil)	99	Dudu	1	0	0	1
11	DF	(Ukraine)	34	Yevhen Khacheridi	1	0	0	1
11	MF	(Serbia)	36	Miloš Ninković	1	0	0	1
11	MF	(Brazil)	85	Raffael	1	0	0	1
11	FW	(Argentina)	15	Marco Ruben	1	0	0	1
11	DF	(Nigeria)	33	Taye Taiwo	0	1	0	1
11	DF	(Croatia)	24	Domagoj Vida	1	0	0	1
				TOTALS	55	1	14	70

=== Appearances and goals ===
As of 1 June 2013

No.	Pos	Nat	Player	Total		Premier League		Ukrainian Cup		Champions League	
No.	Pos	Nat	Player	Apps	Goals	Apps	Goals	Apps	Goals	Apps	Goals
1	GK	(Ukraine) UKR	Oleksandr Shovkovskyi	9	0	6	0	1	0	2	0
2	DF	(Brazil) BRA	Danilo Silva	28	0	21	0	0	0	7	0
3	DF	(Ukraine) UKR	Yevhen Selin	6	0	5+1	0	0	0	0	0
4	MF	(Portugal) POR	Miguel Veloso	37	3	23+1	2	1	0	12	1
8	MF	(Ukraine) UKR	Oleksandr Aliyev	3	0	0+3	0	0	0	0	0
9	MF	(Ukraine) UKR	Roman Bezus	11	1	3+6	1	0	0	2	0
10	FW	(Ukraine) UKR	Andriy Yarmolenko	40	13	23+4	11	1	0	11+1	2
11	FW	(Nigeria) NGR	Brown Ideye	40	21	24+4	17	1	0	9+2	4
13	MF	(Switzerland) SUI	Admir Mehmedi	22	0	8+8	0	0+1	0	2+3	0
15	FW	(Argentina) ARG	Marco Ruben	15	1	5+6	1	0	0	1+3	0
16	MF	(Ukraine) UKR	Serhiy Sydorchuk	7	0	2+5	0	0	0	0	0
17	DF	(Ukraine) UKR	Taras Mykhalyk	26	2	16	1	0	0	10	1
19	MF	(Ukraine) UKR	Denys Harmash	33	2	18+5	2	0	0	6+4	0
20	MF	(Ukraine) UKR	Oleh Husyev	39	6	25+3	4	1	0	6+4	2
21	MF	(Croatia) CRO	Niko Kranjčar	21	4	11+2	4	0	0	6+2	0
22	FW	(Ukraine) UKR	Artem Kravets	1	2	1	2	0	0	0	0
23	MF	(Ukraine) UKR	Vitaliy Buyalskyi	1	0	1	0	0	0	0	0
24	DF	(Croatia) CRO	Domagoj Vida	14	1	12	1	0	0	2	0
25	MF	(Nigeria) NGR	Lukman Haruna	23	6	17+1	5	0	0	4+1	1
29	FW	(Ukraine) UKR	Dmytro Khlyobas	1	0	0+1	0	0	0	0	0
33	DF	(Nigeria) NGR	Taye Taiwo	31	1	19+1	0	1	1	10	0
34	DF	(Ukraine) UKR	Yevhen Khacheridi	32	1	23	1	1	0	8	0
35	GK	(Ukraine) UKR	Maksym Koval	33	0	23	0	0	0	10	0
45	MF	(Ukraine) UKR	Vladyslav Kalytvyntsev	1	0	1	0	0	0	0	0
71	GK	(Ukraine) UKR	Denys Boyko	2	0	1+1	0	0	0	0	0
77	MF	(Ukraine) UKR	Andriy Tsurikov	3	0	1+2	0	0	0	0	0
99	MF	(Brazil) BRA	Dudu	15	1	9+4	1	0	0	2	0
Players who appeared for Dynamo who left the club during the season:
3	DF	(Brazil) BRA	Betão	23	0	12+1	0	1	0	8+1	0
5	MF	(Croatia) CRO	Ognjen Vukojević	22	0	9+3	0	1	0	6+3	0
6	DF	(North Macedonia) MKD	Goran Popov	3	0	1	0	0	0	2	0
10	FW	(Ukraine) UKR	Artem Milevskyi	15	0	3+7	0	0+1	0	1+3	0
23	MF	(Ukraine) UKR	Andriy Bohdanov	10	0	1+6	0	1	0	0+2	0
36	MF	(Serbia) SRB	Miloš Ninković	9	1	1+4	1	0	0	4	0
37	MF	(Nigeria) NGR	Ayila Yussuf	2	0	1+1	0	0	0	0	0
85	MF	(Brazil) BRA	Raffael	13	1	4+5	1	1	0	1+2	0

=== Disciplinary record ===
Number	Nation	Position	Name	Premier League		Ukrainian Cup		Champions League		Total	
Number	Nation	Position	Name	Yellow card	Red card	Yellow card	Red card	Yellow card	Red card	Yellow card	Red card
2	(Brazil)	DF	Danilo Silva	5	0	0	0	1	0	6	0
3	(Ukraine)	DF	Yevhen Selin	1	0	0	0	0	0	1	0
3	(Brazil)	DF	Betão	3	0	0	0	2	0	5	0
4	(Portugal)	MF	Miguel Veloso	8	0	0	0	1	0	9	0
5	(Croatia)	MF	Ognjen Vukojević	4	0	1	0	4	0	9	0
9	(Ukraine)	FW	Andriy Yarmolenko	6	0	1	0	1	0	8	0
10	(Ukraine)	FW	Artem Milevskyi	2	0	1	0	2	0	5	0
11	(Nigeria)	FW	Brown Ideye	3	0	0	0	0	0	3	0
13	(Switzerland)	MF	Admir Mehmedi	1	0	0	0	0	0	1	0
16	(Ukraine)	MF	Serhiy Sydorchuk	1	0	0	0	0	0	1	0
17	(Ukraine)	DF	Taras Mykhalyk	3	2	0	0	1	0	4	2
18	(Ukraine)	MF	Roman Bezus	1	0	0	0	1	0	2	0
19	(Ukraine)	MF	Denys Harmash	3	0	0	0	2	0	5	0
20	(Ukraine)	MF	Oleh Husyev	3	0	0	0	0	0	3	0
21	(Croatia)	MF	Niko Kranjčar	0	0	0	0	1	0	1	0
23	(Ukraine)	MF	Andriy Bohdanov	0	1	0	0	0	0	0	1
24	(Croatia)	DF	Domagoj Vida	2	0	0	0	0	0	2	0
25	(Nigeria)	MF	Lukman Haruna	6	0	0	0	1	0	7	0
33	(Nigeria)	DF	Taye Taiwo	1	0	0	0	1	0	2	0
34	(Ukraine)	DF	Yevhen Khacheridi	5	0	1	0	2	0	8	0
35	(Ukraine)	GK	Maksym Koval	0	1	0	0	1	0	1	1
36	(Serbia)	MF	Miloš Ninković	1	0	0	0	1	0	2	0
37	(Nigeria)	MF	Ayila Yussuf	1	0	0	0	0	0	1	0
99	(Brazil)	MF	Dudu	2	0	0	0	1	0	3	0
			TOTALS	62	4	4	0	22	0	88	4
