= 2011–12 FC Dynamo Kyiv season =

Dynamo Kyiv
2011–12 season
- Chairman: Ihor Surkis
- Manager: Yuri Semin
- Ukrainian Premier League: 2nd
- Ukrainian Cup: Round of 16
- Ukrainian Super Cup: Winners
- UEFA Europa League: Group stage
- Top goalscorer: League: Brown Ideye; Andriy Yarmolenko (12 each); All: Brown Ideye (14 goals)
Home colours	Away colours

This article covers the results and statistics of Dynamo Kyiv during the 2011–12 season. During the season, Dynamo Kyiv competed in the Ukrainian Premier League, Ukrainian Cup, Ukrainian Super Cup, UEFA Champions League and in the UEFA Europa League.

== Squad ==
As of match played 12 May 2012

No.	Name	Nationality	Position	Date of birth (age)	Signed from	Signed in	Contract ends	Apps.	Goals
Goalkeepers
1	Oleksandr Shovkovskyi	(Ukraine)	GK	2 January 1975 (aged 37)	Youth Team	1993		547	0
35	Maksym Koval	(Ukraine)	GK	9 December 1992 (aged 19)	Metalurh Zaporizhya	2010		28	0
74	Artem Kychak	(Ukraine)	GK	16 May 1989 (aged 22)	Youth Team	2006		2	0
Defenders
2	Danilo Silva	(Brazil)	DF	24 November 1986 (aged 25)	Internacional	2010			
3	Betão	(Brazil)	DF	11 November 1983 (aged 28)	Santos	2008			
6	Goran Popov	(North Macedonia)	DF	2 October 1984 (aged 27)	Heerenveen	2010			
17	Taras Mykhalyk	(Ukraine)	DF	28 October 1983 (aged 28)	CSKA Kyiv	2005			
30	Badr El Kaddouri	(Morocco)	DF	31 January 1981 (aged 31)	Wydad Casablanca	2002			
34	Yevhen Khacheridi	(Ukraine)	DF	28 July 1987 (aged 24)	Olkom Melitopol	2008			
44	Leandro Almeida	(Brazil)	DF	14 March 1987 (aged 25)	Atlético Mineiro	2009			
Midfielders
5	Ognjen Vukojević	(Croatia)	MF	20 December 1983 (aged 28)	Dinamo Zagreb	2008			
8	Oleksandr Aliyev	(Ukraine)	MF	3 February 1985 (aged 27)	Borysfen Boryspil	2002		132	30
14	Serhiy Rybalka	(Ukraine)	MF	1 April 1990 (aged 22)	Arsenal Kharkiv	2008			
19	Denys Harmash	(Ukraine)	MF	19 April 1990 (aged 22)	Youth Team	2007			
20	Oleh Husyev	(Ukraine)	MF	25 April 1983 (aged 29)	Arsenal Kyiv	2003			
25	Lukman Haruna	(Nigeria)	MF	4 December 1990 (aged 21)	AS Monaco	2011	2016	23	0
29	Vitaliy Buyalskyi	(Ukraine)	MF	6 January 1993 (aged 19)	Youth Team	2010		1	0
36	Miloš Ninković	(Serbia)	MF	25 December 1984 (aged 27)	Čukarički	2004		156	14
37	Ayila Yussuf	(Nigeria)	MF	4 November 1984 (aged 27)	Union Bank	2004		176	15
45	Vladyslav Kalitvintsev	(Ukraine)	MF	4 January 1993 (aged 19)	Youth Team	2009			
77	Corrêa	(Brazil)	MF	29 December 1980 (aged 31)	Palmeiras	2006			
99	Dudu	(Brazil)	MF	7 January 1992 (aged 20)	Cruzeiro	2011		6	2
Forwards
7	Andriy Shevchenko	(Ukraine)	FW	29 September 1976 (aged 35)	Chelsea	2009		249	124
9	Andriy Yarmolenko	(Ukraine)	FW	23 October 1989 (aged 22)	Desna Chernihiv	2007		139	42
10	Artem Milevskyi	(Ukraine)	FW	12 January 1985 (aged 27)	Borysfen-2 Boryspil	2002		263	87
11	Brown Ideye	(Nigeria)	FW	10 October 1988 (aged 23)	Sochaux	2011	2016	37	14
13	Admir Mehmedi	(Switzerland)	FW	16 March 1991 (aged 21)	Zürich	2012		9	1
27	Andrés Escobar	(Colombia)	FW	14 May 1991 (aged 20)	Deportivo Cali	2011		1	0
Away on loan
	Denys Boyko	(Ukraine)	GK	29 January 1988 (aged 24)	Youth team	2005			
	Andrey Varankow	(Belarus)	FW	8 February 1989 (aged 23)	Youth team	2007			
Left during the season
15	Pape Diakhaté	(Senegal)	DF	21 June 1984 (aged 27)	Nancy	2007			
23	Roman Eremenko	(Finland)	MF	19 March 1987 (aged 25)	Udinese	2009		91	5
24	Fanendo Adi	(Nigeria)	FW	10 October 1990 (aged 21)	loan from Metalurh Donetsk	2011	2011	4	1

== Transfers ==
=== In ===
Date	Position	Nationality	Name	From	Fee	Ref.
23 June 2011	MF	(Nigeria)	Lukman Haruna	AS Monaco	$2,800,000	
6 July 2011	FW	(Nigeria)	Brown Ideye	Sochaux	Undisclosed	
27 August 2011	MF	(Brazil)	Dudu	Cruzeiro	Undisclosed	
28 August 2011	FW	(Colombia)	Andrés Escobar	Deportivo Cali	Undisclosed	

=== Loans in ===
Start date	Position	Nationality	Name	From	End date	Ref.
1 July 2011	FW	(Nigeria)	Fanendo Adi	Metalurh Donetsk	1 December 2011	

=== Out ===
Date	Position	Nationality	Name	To	Fee	Ref.
11 July 2011	FW	(Ukraine)	Roman Zozulya	Dnipro Dnipropetrovsk	Undisclosed	
19 July 2011	FW	(Brazil)	André	Atlético Mineiro	Undisclosed	
1 August 2011	DF	(Senegal)	Pape Diakhaté	Granada	Undisclosed	
2 August 2011	DF	(Russia)	Andrey Yeshchenko	Volga Nizhny Novgorod	Undisclosed	
31 August 2011	MF	(Finland)	Roman Eremenko	Rubin Kazan	Undisclosed	

=== Loans out ===
Start date	Position	Nationality	Name	To	End date	Ref.
1 July 2011	GK	(Ukraine)	Denys Boyko	Kryvbas Kryvyi Rih	End of season	
1 July 2011	FW	(Belarus)	Andrey Varankow	Karpaty Lviv	31 December 2011	
31 August 2011	DF	(Morocco)	Badr El Kaddouri	Celtic	January 2012	
23 March 2012	FW	(Belarus)	Andrey Varankow	Neman Grodno	30 June 2012	

=== Released ===
Date	Position	Nationality	Name	Joined	Date	Ref
30 June 2012	MF	(Brazil)	Corrêa	Palmeiras		
30 June 2012	FW	(Ukraine)	Andriy Shevchenko	Retired		

== Competitions ==
=== Overview ===
Competition	First match	Last match	Starting round	Final position	Record							
Competition	First match	Last match	Starting round	Final position	Pld	W	D	L	GF	GA	GD	Win %
Premier League	10 July 2011	10 May 2012	Matchday 1	2nd	30	23	6	1	56	12	+44	76.67
Ukrainian Cup	21 September 2011	26 October 2011	Round of 32	Round of 16	2	1	0	1	5	5	+0	50.00
Super Cup	5 July 2011	5 July 2011	Final	Final	1	1	0	0	3	1	+2	100.00
UEFA Champions League	26 July 2011	3 August 2011	Third Qualifying Round	Third Qualifying Round	2	0	0	2	1	4	−3	0.00
UEFA Europa League	18 August 2011	14 December 2011	Playoff Round	Group Stage	6	1	4	1	7	7	+0	16.67
Total					41	26	10	5	72	29	+43	63.41

Last updated: 12 May 2012
Source: Competitions

=== Super Cup ===
5 July 2011	Shakhtar Donetsk	1 – 3	Dynamo Kyiv	Poltava
21:00 EEST (UTC+3)	Fernandinho 14' (yellow card) 40'; Srna (yellow card) 40'; Teixeira (yellow card) 85'	Report	Husyev 5' (pen.) (yellow card) 45+1'; Eremenko (yellow card) 15'; Diakhaté 32'; Popov (yellow card) 40'; Yussuf (yellow card) 40'; Vukojević (yellow card) 61'; Milevskyi (yellow card) 75' (goal) 83'; Yarmolenko (yellow card) 84'	Stadium: Oleksiy Butovsky Vorskla Stadium; Attendance: 24,750; Referee: Yuriy Vaks

=== Premier League ===
==== Results summary ====
Overall								Home						Away					
Pld	W	D	L	GF	GA	GD	Pts	W	D	L	GF	GA	GD	W	D	L	GF	GA	GD
30	23	6	1	56	12	+44	75	12	3	0	34	6	+28	11	3	1	22	6	+16

Last updated: 10 May 2012.
Source: See Results

==== Results by round ====
Round	1	2	3	4	5	6	7	8	9	10	11	12	13	14	15	16	17	18	19	20	21	22	23	24	25	26	27	28	29	30
Ground	H	A	H	A	H	A	H	A	H	A	H	A	H	H	A	A	H	A	H	A	H	A	H	A	H	A	H	A	H	A
Result	D	W	W	D	W	W	W	W	W	W	D	W	W	W	D	W	W	W	W	W	W	W	W	W	W	L	W	W	D	D
Position	10	4	2	4	2	2	2	1	2	2	2	2	2	1	1	1	1	1	1	1	1	1	1	1	1	2	2	2	2	2

Source: See Results
A = Away; H = Home; W = Win; D = Draw; L = Loss

==== Results ====
10 July 2011 Match 1	Dynamo Kyiv	1 – 1	Metalist Kharkiv	Kyiv
	Shevchenko 17'	Report	Xavier 3'	Stadium: Lobanovskyi Dynamo Stadium; Attendance: 16,000

16 July 2011 Match 2	Oleksandria	1 – 3	Dynamo Kyiv	Oleksandriia
	Zaporozhan 71'	Report	Yarmolenko 54'; Ideye 56', 80'	Stadium: CSC Nika Stadium; Attendance: 7,000

22 July 2011 Match 3	Dynamo Kyiv	4 – 0	Obolon Kyiv	Kyiv
	Ideye 68', 86'; Khacheridi 77'; Husyev 90+1'	Report		Stadium: Lobanovskyi Dynamo Stadium; Attendance: 10,628

30 July 2011 Match 4	Metalurh Donetsk	0 – 0	Dynamo Kyiv	Donetsk
		Report		Stadium: Metalurh Stadium; Attendance: 3,850

7 August 2011 Match 5	Dynamo Kyiv	2 – 0	Karpaty Lviv	Kyiv
	Shevchenko 34'; Vukojević 55'	Report		Stadium: Lobanovskyi Dynamo Stadium; Attendance: 14,200

13 August 2011 Match 6	Arsenal Kyiv	0 – 2	Dynamo Kyiv	Kyiv
		Report	Shevchenko 37' (pen.); Ideye 39'	Stadium: Lobanovskyi Dynamo Stadium; Attendance: 6,300

21 August 2011 Match 7	Dynamo Kyiv	1 – 0	Kryvbas Kryvyi Rih	Kyiv
	Yarmolenko 50'	Report		Stadium: Lobanovskyi Dynamo Stadium; Attendance: 6,300

28 August 2011 Match 8	Dnipro Dnipropetrovsk	0 – 4	Dynamo Kyiv	Dnipropetrovsk
		Report	Popov 24'; Milevskyi 25'; Yarmolenko 45+2', 70'	Stadium: Dnipro Arena; Attendance: 20,568

11 September 2011 Match 9	Dynamo Kyiv	3 – 1	Illichivets Mariupol	Kyiv
	Ninković 14'; Yarmolenko 69'; Butko 78' (o.g.)	Report	Kozhanov 88'	Stadium: Lobanovskyi Dynamo Stadium; Attendance: 9,200

18 September 2011 Match 10	Chornomorets Odesa	1 – 2	Dynamo Kyiv	Odesa
	Donets' 17'	Report	Aliyev 40' (pen.); Yarmolenko 42'	Stadium: Spartak Stadium; Attendance: 4,610

24 September 2011 Match 11	Dynamo Kyiv	0 – 0	Shakhtar Donetsk	Kyiv
		Report		Stadium: Lobanovskyi Dynamo Stadium; Attendance: 17,000

2 October 2011 Match 12	Vorskla Poltava	1 – 2	Dynamo Kyiv	Poltava
	Krasnopyorov 36'	Report	Ideye 65'; Yarmolenko 70'	Stadium: Butovsky Vorskla Stadium; Attendance: 8,350

16 October 2011 Match 13	Dynamo Kyiv	2 – 1	Volyn Lutsk	Kyiv
	Shevchenko 13'; Milevskyi 24'	Report	Schumacher 27'	Stadium: Lobanovskyi Dynamo Stadium; Attendance: 7,200

23 October 2011 Match 14	Dynamo Kyiv	6 – 1	Zorya Luhansk	Kyiv
	Husyev 12'; Milevskyi 16'; Aliyev 26'; Corrêa 58'; Dudu 61'; Yarmolenko 76'	Report	Bilyi 89'	Stadium: Lobanovskyi Dynamo Stadium; Attendance: 4,653

30 October 2011 Match 15	Tavriya Simferopol	0 – 0	Dynamo Kyiv	Simferopol
		Report		Stadium: Lokomotiv Stadium; Attendance: 12,000

6 November 2011 Match 16	Metalist Kharkiv	1 – 2	Dynamo Kyiv	Kharkiv
	Devych 76'	Report	Ideye 8', 35'	Stadium: Metalist Stadium; Attendance: 37,803

20 November 2011 Match 17	Dynamo Kyiv	4 – 0	Oleksandria	Kyiv
	Ideye 4'; Yarmolenko 45+1', 83'; Nazarenko 57' (o.g.)	Report		Stadium: Lobanovskyi Dynamo Stadium; Attendance: 3,890

26 November 2011 Match 18	Obolon Kyiv	0 – 1	Dynamo Kyiv	Kyiv
		Report	Yarmolenko 19'	Stadium: Obolon Arena; Attendance: 5,100

5 December 2011 Match 19	Dynamo Kyiv	1 – 0	Metalurh Donetsk	Kyiv
	Vukojević 89'	Report		Stadium: Lobanovskyi Dynamo Stadium; Attendance: 12,800

10 December 2011 Match 20	Karpaty Lviv	0 – 1	Dynamo Kyiv	Lviv
		Report	Ideye 88'	Stadium: Arena Lviv; Attendance: 32,600

3 March 2012 Match 21	Dynamo Kyiv	1 – 0	Arsenal Kyiv	Kyiv
	Aliyev 65'	Report		Stadium: Olimpiysky Stadium; Attendance: 51,258

11 March 2012 Match 22	Kryvbas Kryvyi Rih	0 – 3	Dynamo Kyiv	Kryvyi Rih
		Report	Yarmolenko 5'; Husyev 10'; Mehmedi 90+8'	Stadium: Metalurh Stadium; Attendance: 7,500

18 March 2012 Match 23	Dynamo Kyiv	2 – 0	Dnipro Dnipropetrovsk	Kyiv
	Aliyev 67'; Milevskyi 83'	Report		Stadium: Olimpiysky Stadium; Attendance: 68,014

25 March 2012 Match 24	Illichivets Mariupol	0 – 1	Dynamo Kyiv	Mariupol
			Ideye 38'	Stadium: Illichivets Stadium; Attendance: 11,000

1 April 2012 Match 25	Dynamo Kyiv	3 – 1	Chornomorets Odesa	Kyiv
	Ideye 27'; Harmash 41'; Aliyev 69'	Report	Matos 74'	Stadium: Olimpiysky Stadium; Attendance: 42,327

7 April 2012 Match 26	Shakhtar Donetsk	2 – 0	Dynamo Kyiv	Donetsk
	Teixeira 56'; Rakitskiy 81'	Report		Stadium: Donbas Arena; Attendance: 52,207

13 April 2012 Match 27	Dynamo Kyiv	3 – 0	Vorskla Poltava	Kyiv
	Milevskyi 45+2'; Corrêa 49'; Shevchenko 63'	Report		Stadium: Olimpiysky Stadium; Attendance: 28,480

20 April 2012 Match 28	Volyn Lutsk	0 – 1	Dynamo Kyiv	Lutsk
		Report	Shevchenko 45+3'	Stadium: Avanhard Stadium; Attendance: 11,000

2 May 2012 Match 29	Zorya Luhansk	0 – 0	Dynamo Kyiv	Luhansk
		Report		Stadium: Avanhard Stadium; Attendance: 19,800

10 May 2012 Match 30	Dynamo Kyiv	1 – 1	Tavriya Simferopol	Kyiv
	Milevskyi 25'	Report	Ljubičić 16'	Stadium: Olimpiysky Stadium; Attendance: 25,540

==== League table ====
Pos	Team	Pld	W	D	L	GF	GA	GD	Pts	Qualification or relegation
1	Shakhtar Donetsk (C)	30	25	4	1	80	18	+62	79 (Note: Between Round 26 and Round 28 Dynamo Kyiv and Shakhtar Donetsk had accumulated the same number of points. With the possibility that both teams could finish the competition on the same number of points, the administration of the Premier League decided on 2 May 2012 before Round 29, that if a Golden Match was to be played to decide the championship winner, the encounter would have taken place on 13 May 2012 in Zaporizhzhia at Slavutych Arena.)	Qualification to Champions League group stage
2	Dynamo Kyiv	30	23	6	1	56	12	+44	75	Qualification to Champions League third qualifying round
3	Metalist Kharkiv	30	16	11	3	54	32	+22	59 (Note: On 12 August 2010, the Football Federation of Ukraine punished Metalist Kharkiv and Karpaty Lviv for fixing a match in 2008; both teams were handed a fine and deducted nine points each. The FFU then released a statement on 19 October 2010 that the point deductions will be applied for the 2011–12 season. However, Karpaty Lviv have indicated that they will take the matter to the Court of Arbitration for Sport (CAS) at Lausanne. No action had been taken through the season nor of any decision by the league. On 2 August 2013 CAS acknowledged the fact of game fixing between Karpaty and Metalist in 2008. The court did not approve points deduction for both of the clubs, yet suggested to have Metalist stripped of its bronze awards for the 2007–08 Ukrainian Premier League and number of players and staff from both clubs were posed penalties and fines for involvement in the game fixing. On 6 August 2013 UEFA suspended advancement of Metalist Kharkiv in the 2013–14 UEFA Champions League to the playoff round until its final decision on 13 August 2013.)	Qualification to Europa League play-off round (Note: Metalurh Donetsk qualified for the Europa League as losing finalist of the 2011–12 Ukrainian Cup to Champions League-qualified Shakhtar Donetsk. Moreover, Dnipro Dnipropetrovsk and Arsenal Kyiv were moved up a round as the cup winner spot was not used.)
4	Dnipro Dnipropetrovsk	30	15	7	8	52	35	+17	52	Qualification to Europa League play-off round
5	Arsenal Kyiv	30	14	9	7	44	27	+17	51	Qualification to Europa League third qualifying round

Source: uafootball.net.ua
Rules for classification: 1st points; 2nd goal difference; 3rd goals scored; 4th fair play
(C) Champions

=== Ukrainian Cup ===
21 September 2011 Round of 32	Kremin Kremenchuk	2 – 3	Dynamo Kyiv	Kremenchuk
	Sumtsov 60'; Vovchenko 80'	Report	Rybalka 14'; Adi 15'; Dudu 46'	Stadium: FC Kremin Stadium; Attendance: 2,200

26 October 2011 Round of 16	Dynamo Kyiv	2 – 3	Shakhtar Donetsk	Kyiv
	Yarmolenko 41'; Milevskyi 90+4'	Report	Eduardo 9', 88'; Teixeira 31'	Stadium: Lobanovskyi Dynamo Stadium; Attendance: 16,000

=== UEFA Champions League ===
==== Qualifying rounds ====
26 July 2011 Third Qualifying Round 1st leg	Dynamo Kyiv (Ukraine)	0 – 2	(Russia) Rubin Kazan	Kyiv, Ukraine
21:00 EEST (UTC+3)	Khacheridi (yellow card) 67'	Report	Kasaev 6'; Medvedev (yellow card) 65'; Natcho 68' (pen.); Karadeniz (yellow card) 70'	Stadium: Valeriy Lobanovskyi Dynamo Stadium; Attendance: 16,430; Referee: David Fernández Borbalán (Spain)

3 August 2011 Third Qualifying Round 2nd leg	Rubin Kazan (Russia)	2 – 1 (4 – 1 agg.)	(Ukraine) Dynamo Kyiv	Kazan, Russia
19:00 EEST (UTC+3)	Dyadyun 19'; Bocchetti (yellow card) 49'; Medvedev 88'	Report	Haruna (yellow card) 14'; Vukojević (yellow card) 40'; Danilo Silva (yellow card) 45'; Yarmolenko (yellow card) 83'; Husyev 90+2'	Stadium: Central Stadium; Attendance: 19,820; Referee: Eric Braamhaar (Netherlands)

=== UEFA Europa League ===
==== Qualifying rounds ====
18 August 2011 Play-off 1st leg	Litex Lovech (Bulgaria)	1 – 2	(Ukraine) Dynamo Kyiv	Lovech, Bulgaria
19:45 EEST (UTC+3)	Vinícius (yellow card) 7'; Zanev (yellow card) 10'; Yanev 13' (yellow card) 71'; Bodurov (yellow card) 84'	Report	Ninković 7' (pen.); Popov (yellow card) 30'; Eremenko (yellow card) 42'; Ideye 77'	Stadium: Lovech Stadium; Attendance: 5,862; Referee: Michael Koukoulakis (Greece)

25 August 2011 Play-off 2nd leg	Dynamo Kyiv (Ukraine)	1 – 0 (3 – 1 agg.)	(Bulgaria) Litex Lovech	Kyiv, Ukraine
20:00 EEST (UTC+3)	Milevskyi (yellow card) 24' (goal) 74'; Yarmolenko (yellow card) 45'	Report	Josse (yellow card) 54' (yellow-red card) 77'; Milanov (yellow card) 83'	Stadium: Valeriy Lobanovskyi Dynamo Stadium; Attendance: 8,100; Referee: Stuart Attwell (England)

==== Group stage ====
Pos	Team	Pld	W	D	L	GF	GA	GD	Pts	Qualification	BEŞ	SC	DK	MTA
1	(Turkey) Beşiktaş	6	4	0	2	13	7	+6	12	Advance to knockout phase	—	3–1	1–0	5–1
2	(England) Stoke City	6	3	2	1	10	7	+3	11	Advance to knockout phase	2–1	—	1–1	3–0
3	(Ukraine) Dynamo Kyiv	6	1	4	1	7	7	0	7		1–0	1–1	—	3–3
4	(Israel) Maccabi Tel Aviv	6	0	2	4	8	17	−9	2		2–3	1–2	1–1	—

Source: Soccerway

15 September 2011 1	Dynamo Kyiv (Ukraine)	1 – 1	(England) Stoke City	Kyiv, Ukraine
20:00 EEST (UTC+3)	Harmash (yellow card) 45'; Milevskyi (yellow card) 48'; Popov (yellow card) 57'; Haruna (yellow card) 66'; Vukojević 90+1'	Report	Diao (yellow card) 16'; Shawcross (yellow card) 40'; Upson (yellow card) 43'; Huth (yellow card) 44'; Jerome 55'	Stadium: Valeriy Lobanovskyi Dynamo Stadium; Attendance: 14,500; Referee: Ovidiu Hațegan (Romania)

29 September 2011 2	Maccabi Tel Aviv (Israel)	1 – 1	(Ukraine) Dynamo Kyiv	Tel Aviv, Israel
22:05 EEST (UTC+3)	Dabbur (yellow card) 21'; Micha (yellow card) 36' (goal) 44'; Lugasi (yellow card) 65'	Report	Harmash (yellow card) 3'; Ideye 9'; Haruna (yellow card) 45+1'; Danilo Silva (yellow card) 90'	Stadium: Bloomfield Stadium; Attendance: 13,835; Referee: Marijo Strahonja (Croatia)

20 October 2011 3	Dynamo Kyiv (Ukraine)	1 – 0	(Turkey) Beşiktaş	Kyiv, Ukraine
22:05 EEST (UTC+3)	Husyev (yellow card) 33'; Vukojević (yellow card) 90'; Harmash 90+4'	Report	Quaresma (yellow card) 29'; Ernst (yellow card) 62'; Aurélio (yellow card) 87'; Sivok (yellow card) 88'; Gönen (yellow card) 90+3'	Stadium: Valeriy Lobanovskyi Dynamo Stadium; Attendance: 13,500; Referee: Milorad Mažić (Serbia)

3 November 2011 4	Beşiktaş (Turkey)	1 – 0	(Ukraine) Dynamo Kyiv	Istanbul, Turkey
20:00 EET (UTC+2)	Kavlak (yellow card) 59'; Korkmaz (yellow card) 64' (goal) 68'	Report	Harmash (yellow card) 33'; Aliyev (yellow card) 40'	Stadium: BJK İnönü Stadium; Attendance: 24,183; Referee: Tommy Skjerven (Norway)

1 December 2011 5	Stoke City (England)	1 – 1	(Ukraine) Dynamo Kyiv	Stoke-on-Trent, England
22:05 EET (UTC+2)	Huth (yellow card) 77'; Jones 81'	Report	Yarmolenko (yellow card) 7'; Upson 27' (o.g.); Khacheridi (yellow card) 83'	Stadium: Britannia Stadium; Attendance: 23,774; Referee: Florian Meyer (Germany)

14 December 2011 6	Dynamo Kyiv (Ukraine)	3 – 3	(Israel) Maccabi Tel Aviv	Kyiv, Ukraine
20:00 EET (UTC+2)	Yeini 12' (o.g.); Husyev 17', 80'; Leandro Almeida (red card) 47'; Khacheridi (red card) 56'; Yarmolenko (yellow card) 60'; Aliyev (yellow card) 79'	Report	Vered 49'; Nivaldo (yellow card) 54'; Yeini (yellow card) 56'; Atar 62' (yellow card) 62'; Konaté (yellow card) 69'; Dabbur 75'	Stadium: Valeriy Lobanovskyi Dynamo Stadium; Attendance: 3,850; Referee: Daniel Stålhammar (Sweden)

== Squad statistics ==
As of match played 10 May 2012

=== Appearances and goals ===
No.	Pos	Nat	Player	Total		Premier League		Ukrainian Cup		Super Cup		UEFA Champions League		UEFA Europa League	
No.	Pos	Nat	Player	Apps	Goals	Apps	Goals	Apps	Goals	Apps	Goals	Apps	Goals	Apps	Goals
1	GK	(Ukraine) UKR	Oleksandr Shovkovskyi	35	0	24	0	1	0	1	0	2	0	7	0
2	DF	(Brazil) BRA	Danilo Silva	38	0	25+2	0	1	0	1	0	2	0	7	0
3	DF	(Brazil) BRA	Betão	34	0	24+1	0	1	0	0	0	0	0	8	0
5	MF	(Croatia) CRO	Ognjen Vukojević	38	3	25+2	2	1	0	1	0	2	0	7	1
6	DF	(North Macedonia) MKD	Goran Popov	24	1	16	1	1	0	1	0	1	0	4+1	0
7	FW	(Ukraine) UKR	Andriy Shevchenko	22	6	12+4	6	1	0	0	0	0+1	0	4	0
8	MF	(Ukraine) UKR	Oleksandr Aliyev	37	5	17+9	5	0+1	0	0+1	0	0+1	0	5+3	0
9	FW	(Ukraine) UKR	Andriy Yarmolenko	40	13	26+2	12	1	1	1	0	2	0	8	0
10	FW	(Ukraine) UKR	Artem Milevskyi	29	9	16+2	6	1+1	1	1	1	0+1	0	5+2	1
11	FW	(Nigeria) NGR	Brown Ideye	37	14	25+2	12	1	0	0	0	1	0	6+2	2
13	FW	(Switzerland) SUI	Admir Mehmedi	9	1	5+4	1	0	0	0	0	0	0	0	0
14	MF	(Ukraine) UKR	Serhiy Rybalka	3	1	0+2	0	1	1	0	0	0	0	0	0
17	DF	(Ukraine) UKR	Taras Mykhalyk	9	0	6+1	0	1	0	0	0	0	0	1	0
19	MF	(Ukraine) UKR	Denys Harmash	33	2	13+9	1	2	0	0+1	0	0+1	0	5+2	1
20	MF	(Ukraine) UKR	Oleh Husyev	31	7	20+2	3	2	0	1	1	2	1	3+1	2
25	MF	(Nigeria) NGR	Lukman Haruna	23	0	10+4	0	1	0	1	0	2	0	0+5	0
27	FW	(Colombia) COL	Andrés Escobar	1	0	0	0	0+1	0	0	0	0	0	0	0
29	MF	(Ukraine) UKR	Vitaliy Buyalskyi	1	0	0	0	0+1	0	0	0	0	0	0	0
34	DF	(Ukraine) UKR	Yevhen Khacheridi	24	1	16+3	1	0	0	0	0	1	0	4	0
35	GK	(Ukraine) UKR	Maksym Koval	10	0	6+2	0	1	0	0	0	0	0	1	0
36	MF	(Serbia) SRB	Miloš Ninković	22	2	7+9	1	0	0	0	0	0+1	0	3+2	1
37	MF	(Nigeria) NGR	Ayila Yussuf	20	0	9+2	0	1	0	1	0	1	0	6	0
44	DF	(Brazil) BRA	Leandro Almeida	13	0	10+2	0	0	0	0	0	0	0	1	0
45	MF	(Ukraine) UKR	Vladyslav Kalitvintsev	2	0	0+1	0	0	0	0	0	0	0	1	0
74	GK	(Ukraine) UKR	Artem Kychak	1	0	0+1	0	0	0	0	0	0	0	0	0
77	MF	(Brazil) BRA	Corrêa	14	2	4+8	2	1	0	0	0	0	0	1	0
99	MF	(Brazil) BRA	Dudu	6	2	1+3	1	1	1	0	0	0	0	0+1	0
Players away from Dynamo Kyiv on loan:
30	DF	(Morocco) MAR	Badr El Kaddouri	5	0	1+2	0	0	0	0+1	0	1	0	0	0
Players who left Dynamo Kyiv during the season:
15	DF	(Senegal) SEN	Pape Diakhaté	9	1	6	0	0	0	1	1	2	0	0	0
23	MF	(Finland) FIN	Roman Eremenko	11	0	6	0	0	0	1	0	2	0	2	0
24	FW	(Nigeria) NGR	Fanendo Adi	4	1	0+3	0	1	1	0	0	0	0	0	0

=== Goal scorers ===
Place	Position	Nation	Number	Name	Premier League	Ukrainian Cup	Super Cup	UEFA Champions League	UEFA Europa League	Total
1	FW	(Nigeria)	11	Brown Ideye	12	0	0	0	2	14
2	FW	(Ukraine)	9	Andriy Yarmolenko	12	1	0	0	0	13
3	FW	(Ukraine)	10	Artem Milevskyi	6	1	1	0	1	9
4	MF	(Ukraine)	20	Oleh Husyev	3	0	1	1	2	7
5	FW	(Ukraine)	7	Andriy Shevchenko	6	0	0	0	0	6
6	MF	(Ukraine)	8	Oleksandr Aliyev	5	0	0	0	0	5
7				Own goal	2	0	0	0	2	4
8	MF	(Croatia)	5	Ognjen Vukojević	2	0	0	0	1	3
9	MF	(Brazil)	77	Corrêa	2	0	0	0	0	2
9	MF	(Brazil)	99	Dudu	1	1	0	0	0	2
9	MF	(Ukraine)	19	Denys Harmash	1	0	0	0	1	2
9	MF	(Serbia)	36	Miloš Ninković	1	0	0	0	1	2
13	DF	(North Macedonia)	6	Goran Popov	1	0	0	0	0	1
13	FW	(Switzerland)	13	Admir Mehmedi	1	0	0	0	0	1
13	DF	(Ukraine)	34	Yevhen Khacheridi	1	0	0	0	0	1
13	MF	(Ukraine)	14	Serhiy Rybalka	0	1	0	0	0	1
13	FW	(Nigeria)	24	Fanendo Adi	0	1	0	0	0	1
13	DF	(Senegal)	15	Pape Diakhaté	0	0	1	0	0	1
				TOTALS	56	5	3	1	10	75

=== Clean sheets ===
Place	Position	Nation	Number	Name	Premier League	Ukrainian Cup	Super Cup	UEFA Champions League	UEFA Europa League	Total
1	GK	(Ukraine)	1	Oleksandr Shovkovskyi	15	0	0	0	2	17
2	GK	(Ukraine)	35	Maksym Koval	6	0	0	0	0	6
				TOTALS	19	0	0	0	2	21

Shovkovskyi & Koval both played in Dynamo Kyiv's 0-0 draw against Tavriya Simferopol on 30 October 2011
Shovkovskyi & Koval both played in Dynamo Kyiv's 1-0 victory over Volyn Lutsk on 20 April 2012

=== Disciplinary record ===
Number	Nation	Position	Name	Premier League		Ukrainian Cup		Super Cup		UEFA Champions League		UEFA Europa League		Total	
Number	Nation	Position	Name	Yellow card	Red card	Yellow card	Red card	Yellow card	Red card	Yellow card	Red card	Yellow card	Red card	Yellow card	Red card
2	(Brazil)	DF	Danilo Silva	4	0	0	0	0	0	1	0	1	0	6	0
3	(Brazil)	DF	Betão	3	0	0	0	0	0	0	0	0	0	3	0
5	(Croatia)	MF	Ognjen Vukojević	6	0	0	0	1	0	1	0	1	0	9	0
6	(North Macedonia)	DF	Goran Popov	5	0	1	0	1	0	0	0	2	0	9	0
7	(Ukraine)	FW	Andriy Shevchenko	2	0	0	0	0	0	0	0	0	0	2	0
8	(Ukraine)	MF	Oleksandr Aliyev	6	0	1	0	0	0	0	0	2	0	9	0
9	(Ukraine)	FW	Andriy Yarmolenko	7	1	1	0	1	0	1	0	3	0	13	1
10	(Ukraine)	FW	Artem Milevskyi	7	1	0	0	1	0	0	0	2	0	10	1
11	(Nigeria)	FW	Brown Ideye	4	0	0	0	0	0	0	0	0	0	4	0
14	(Ukraine)	MF	Serhiy Rybalka	1	0	0	0	0	0	0	0	0	0	1	0
17	(Ukraine)	DF	Taras Mykhalyk	3	0	1	0	0	0	0	0	0	0	4	0
19	(Ukraine)	MF	Denys Harmash	9	2	1	0	0	0	0	0	3	0	13	2
20	(Ukraine)	MF	Oleh Husyev	4	0	1	0	1	0	0	0	1	0	7	0
25	(Nigeria)	MF	Lukman Haruna	6	0	0	0	0	0	1	0	2	0	9	0
34	(Ukraine)	DF	Yevhen Khacheridi	5	0	0	0	0	0	1	0	1	1	7	1
35	(Ukraine)	GK	Maksym Koval	0	1	0	0	0	0	0	0	0	0	0	1
36	(Serbia)	MF	Miloš Ninković	2	0	0	0	0	0	0	0	0	0	2	0
37	(Nigeria)	MF	Ayila Yussuf	1	0	0	0	1	0	0	0	0	0	2	0
44	(Brazil)	DF	Leandro Almeida	3	0	0	0	0	0	0	0	0	1	3	1
45	(Ukraine)	MF	Vladyslav Kalitvintsev	0	0	1	0	0	0	0	0	0	0	1	0
77	(Brazil)	MF	Corrêa	1	0	0	0	0	0	0	0	0	0	1	0
Players away on loan:
Players who left Dynamo Kyiv during the season:
15	(Senegal)	DF	Pape Diakhaté	2	0	0	0	0	0	0	0	0	0	2	0
23	(Finland)	MF	Roman Eremenko	3	0	0	0	1	0	0	0	1	0	5	0
			TOTALS	84	5	7	0	7	0	5	0	19	2	122	5
