= 2011 Ukrainian Super Cup =

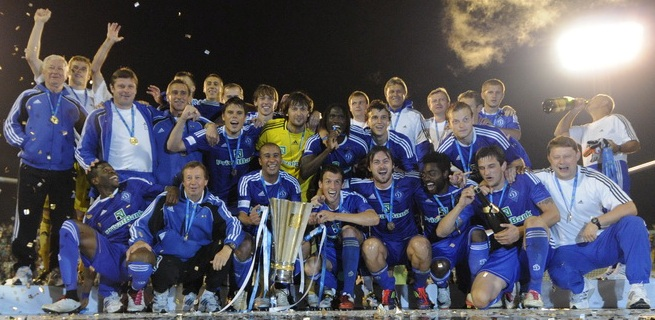
- Kaddouri holding the trophy
Shakhtar Donetsk	Dynamo Kyiv
1	3
- Date: 5 July 2011
- Venue: Vorskla Stadium, Poltava
- Referee: Yuriy Vaks (Simferopol)
- Attendance: 24,750

The 2011 Ukrainian Super Cup became the eighth edition of Ukrainian Super Cup, which is an annual season opening football exhibition game contested by the winners of the previous season's Ukrainian Top League and Ukrainian Cup competitions.

The match was played on 5 July 2011 in Poltava at the Vorskla Stadium becoming second time when the game was played at the stadium.

This year the Super Cup was contested by league and cup winner Shakhtar Donetsk and cup runner-up Dynamo Kyiv. Dynamo won it 3–1.

== Match ==
=== Details ===
5 July 2011
21:00

Shakhtar Donetsk	1–3	Dynamo Kyiv
Fernandinho 11'	Report	Husyev 5' (pen.); Diakhaté 32'; Milevskyi 83'

Vorskla Stadium, Poltava
Attendance: 24,750
Referee: Yuriy Vaks (Simferopol)

Shakhtar Donetsk	Dynamo Kyiv

GK	30	(Ukraine) Andriy Pyatov
DF	33	(Croatia) Darijo Srna (c)	(yellow card) 40'
DF	5	(Ukraine) Oleksandr Kucher
DF	44	(Ukraine) Yaroslav Rakytskyi
DF	13	(Ukraine) Vyacheslav Shevchuk
MF	3	(Czech Republic) Tomáš Hübschman
MF	7	(Brazil) Fernandinho	(yellow card) 40'
MF	22	(Armenia) Henrikh Mkhitaryan		(substituted off) 64'
MF	20	(Brazil) Douglas Costa
MF	19	(Brazil) Willian
CF	9	(Brazil) Luiz Adriano		(substituted off) 71'
Substitutes:
GK	25	(Ukraine) Oleksandr Rybka
DF	32	(Ukraine) Mykola Ishchenko
MF	29	(Brazil) Alex Teixeira	(yellow card) 85'	(substituted in) 64'
MF	19	(Ukraine) Oleksiy Ghai
DF	14	(Ukraine) Vasyl Kobin
CF	31	(Brazil) Dentinho
CF	17	(Ukraine) Yevhen Seleznyov		(substituted in) 71'
Manager :
	(Romania) Mircea Lucescu

GK	1	(Ukraine) Oleksandr Shovkovskyi (c)
DF	2	(Brazil) Danilo Silva
MF	5	(Croatia) Ognjen Vukojević	(yellow card) 61'
DF	6	(North Macedonia) Goran Popov	(yellow card) 40'
MF	9	(Ukraine) Andriy Yarmolenko	(yellow card) 84'	(substituted off) 90+3'
CF	10	(Ukraine) Artem Milevskyi	(yellow card) 75'
DF	15	(Senegal) Pape Diakhaté
MF	20	(Ukraine) Oleh Husyev	(yellow card) 45+1'	(substituted off) 90+4'
MF	23	(Finland) Roman Eremenko	(yellow card) 15'
MF	25	(Nigeria) Lukman Haruna		(substituted off) 65'
DF	37	(Nigeria) Ayila Yussuf	(yellow card) 40'
Substitutes:
GK	35	(Ukraine) Maksym Koval
CF	7	(Ukraine) Andriy Shevchenko
MF	8	(Ukraine) Oleksandr Aliyev		(substituted in) 90+3'
MF	19	(Ukraine) Denys Harmash		(substituted in) 90+4'
DF	30	(Morocco) Badr El Kaddouri		(substituted in) 65'
DF	34	(Ukraine) Yevhen Khacheridi
MF	36	(Serbia) Miloš Ninković
Manager :
	(Russia) Yuriy Syomin
