= Brown Ideye =

Nigerian footballer (born 1988)

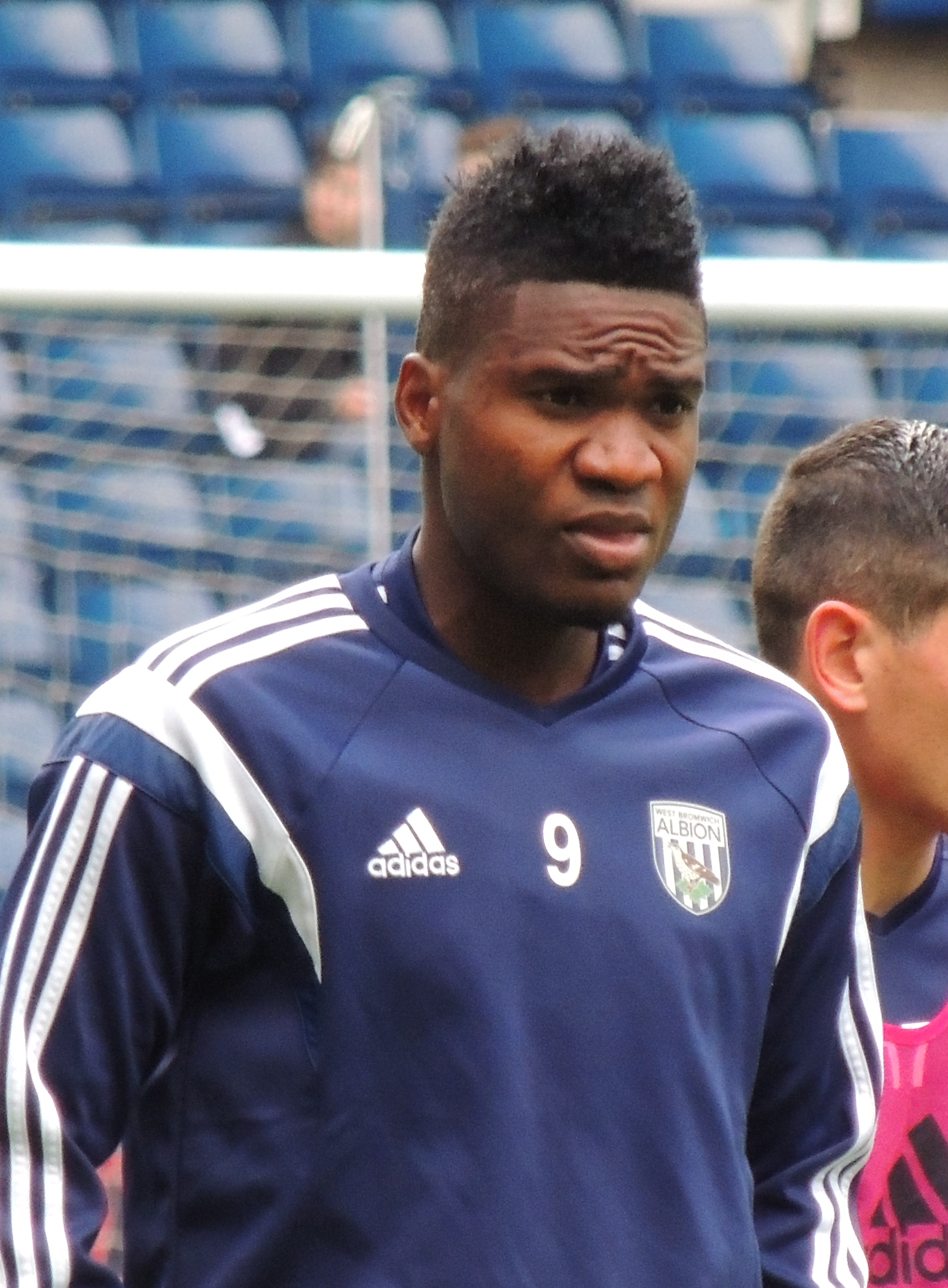
- Ideye with West Bromwich Albion in 2014

Personal information
- Full name: Aide Brown Ideye
- Date of birth: 10 October 1988 (age 38)
- Place of birth: Yenagoa, Bayelsa State, Nigeria
- Height: 1.81 m (5 ft 11 in)
- Position: Striker

Senior career*
| Years | Team | Apps | (Gls) |
| 2006–2007 | Bayelsa United | 19 | (6) |
| 2006–2007 | Ocean Boys | 13 | (10) |
| 2007–2009 | Neuchâtel Xamax | 55 | (23) |
| 2009–2011 | Sochaux | 52 | (17) |
| 2011–2014 | Dynamo Kyiv | 74 | (34) |
| 2014–2015 | West Bromwich Albion | 24 | (4) |
| 2015–2017 | Olympiacos | 43 | (23) |
| 2017–2019 | Tianjin Teda | 14 | (4) |
| 2018 | → Málaga (loan) | 13 | (2) |
| 2019–2020 | Aris | 22 | (8) |
| 2020–2021 | Göztepe | 35 | (2) |
| 2022 | Al-Yarmouk | 8 | (4) |
| 2024–2025 | Enyimba | 10 | (4) |
| Total | | 382 | (141) |

International career
| 2007 | Nigeria U20 | 5 | (1) |
| 2010–2016 | Nigeria | 28 | (6) |
Medal record
Men's football
Representing Nigeria
Africa Cup of Nations
| Winner | 2013 South Africa | Team |
- * Club domestic league appearances and goals

Aide Brown Ideye MON (born 10 October 1988) is a Nigerian former professional footballer who played as a striker. He represented the Nigeria national team at international level, winning the 2013 Africa Cup of Nations.

== Club career ==
=== Early career ===
Born in Yenagoa, Bayelsa State, Nigeria, Ideye began his career with Bayelsa United before moving to Ocean Boys. He was a member of the Ocean Boys team that won the Nigeria Premier League in 2006.

In January 2008 Ideye moved to Europe to sign with Swiss Super League club Neuchâtel Xamax. Before this move to Switzerland, he was on trial with Dutch side Willem II, but was not signed. After three years with Xamax, Ideye left to sign for French Ligue 1 club Sochaux.

=== Dynamo Kyiv ===
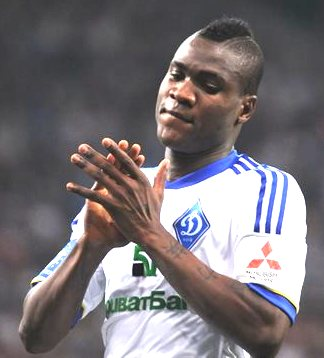
Ideye playing for Dynamo Kyiv in 2013

On 6 July 2011, Ideye signed a five-year deal with Ukrainian side Dynamo Kyiv. He made his first appearance on 16 July against Oleksandria, scoring two goals. In his second game for Dynamo, he again scored a brace, this time against Obolon Kyiv. On 7 August 2012, Ideye scored the winner in a UEFA Champions League qualifying third round second-leg game against Feyenoord, in which Dynamo ultimately progressed. He also scored against Borussia Mönchengladbach in the second-leg of the play-off round. Mönchengladbach won the game 2–1, but Kyiv progressed to the Champions League group stage on a 4–3 aggregate score. On 15 May 2014, Ideye was an unused substitute in Dynamo's 2–1 win over Shakhtar Donetsk in the 2014 Ukrainian Cup Final.

=== West Bromwich Albion ===
Ideye in 2015

On 18 July 2014, Ideye signed a three-year deal with English Premier League club West Bromwich Albion, becoming the club's record signing at a fee reported as £10 million. The contract included an option in the club's favour for an extra year. After a difficult start to the season in England, Ideye scored his first league goal for the club in their 3–1 loss to Manchester City on Boxing Day 2014, and scored four times in a six-day spell in February 2015 with goals against Burnley and Swansea City in the Premier League and two against West Ham United in the FA Cup.

=== Olympiacos ===
On 31 August 2015, Ideye joined Olympiacos from West Brom for an undisclosed fee, though believed to be around €6 million. The prospect of featuring in the Champions League again was rumoured to play a crucial role in convincing Ideye to move to the Athens-based club.

On 20 October 2015, Ideye scored a goal in Olympiacos' Champions League group stage victory over Dinamo Zagreb (1–0). He scored the 79th-minute winner with a superb finish from a tight angle, redeeming himself for an astonishing miss earlier in the second half. On 9 March 2016, Ideye received a lucrative offer from China during the January transfer window, however he rejected the offer as he preferred to stay with the reigning Super League Greece champions. On 17 April 2016, he was a key member for the club as it celebrated winning the domestic championship for the sixth consecutive season.

=== Tianjin Teda ===
Ideye left Olympiakos for Chinese Super League side Tianjin Teda in the January 2017 transfer window. Ideye joined the Chinese club on a two-and-a-half-year contract for a transfer fee of €12 million. His contract, which ran until the summer of 2019, was worth €3.5 million per year.

==== Málaga (loan) ====
On 29 January 2018, Ideye joined Spanish La Liga side Málaga on loan for six months.

=== Aris ===
On 20 June 2019, he joined Aris on a one-year contract, for an annual fee of €500,000.

Ideye had to wait until mid September to find his first goal, when he scored in a stunning 4–0 home win against Panathinaikos, which was also the first of the season. One week later, he received a low cross from Giannis Fetfatzidis and sent the ball in the back of the net, opening the score in an away Derby of Thessaloniki against PAOK, which ended as a 2–2 draw. On 27 October 2019, he scored from the penalty spot, sealing a 2–0 home win against Panetolikos. On 14 December 2019, he returned to the starring line-up, after a two-game suspension, and scored in a 3–1 away loss against OFI. On 19 December 2019, Nigerian striker Brown Ideye netted after 12 and 25 minutes to set an irresistible Aris on their way to complete a hammering 4–0 win against Volos.

On 8 January 2020, he scored in a 1–0 away win against Xanthi, in the first leg of the round of 16 of the Greek Cup and in the rematch he netted another one, helping to a 2–1 win and a qualification to the quarter finals. On 22 February 2020, he scored an equalizer in a 2–2 away draw against Lamia.

On 14 June 2020, he scored in a 3–1 away loss against Olympiacos for the Super League play-offs.

=== Enyimba ===
In December 2024, Ideye signed for Nigerian Professional Football League club Enyimba until the end of the 2024–25 season. After leaving the club at the end of the season, he publicly raised concerns over player welfare and unpaid bonuses.

== International career ==
Ideye represented his country at the 2007 FIFA U-20 World Cup in Canada. He played five games in the tournament and scored one goal, against Costa Rica. In May 2010, he was called up to the senior side as part of the 30-man team for the 2010 FIFA World Cup in South Africa. He was not part of the final 23-man squad, but was subsequently called up after a knee injury to Mikel John Obi ruled the midfielder out of the competition. Ideye was also called up to Nigeria's 23-man squad for the 2013 Africa Cup of Nations, playing in most of their games at the tournament. He scored Nigeria's second goal in their 4–1 semi-final win over Mali and played in their 1–0 win over Burkina Faso in the final.

Ideye was selected for Nigeria's squad at the 2013 FIFA Confederations Cup.

== Post-playing career ==
Ideye became the current "Director of Player Pathways and Partnerships" at Atlantic Business Football Club in July 2025.

== Career statistics ==
=== Club ===
As of match played 7 November 2021

Appearances and goals by club, season and competition
| Club | Season | League | | | National cup (Note: Includes Swiss Cup, Coupe de France, Ukrainian Cup, FA Cup, Greek Football Cup, Turkish Cup) | | League cup (Note: Includes Football League Cup) | | Continental | | Total | |
| Club | Season | Division | Apps | Goals | Apps | Goals | Apps | Goals | Apps | Goals | Apps | Goals |
|---|---|---|---|---|---|---|---|---|---|---|---|---|
| Bayelsa United | 2006 | Nigeria Premier League | 19 | 6 | 0 | 0 | — | | — | | 19 | 6 |
| Ocean Boys | 2006 | Nigeria Premier League | 5 | 1 | 0 | 0 | — | | — | | 5 | 1 |
| Ocean Boys | 2007 | Nigeria Premier League | 8 | 9 | 0 | 0 | — | | — | | 8 | 9 |
| Ocean Boys | Total | | 13 | 10 | 0 | 0 | — | | — | | 13 | 10 |
| Neuchâtel Xamax | 2007–08 | Swiss Super League | 5 | 1 | 0 | 0 | — | | — | | 5 | 1 |
| Neuchâtel Xamax | 2008–09 | Swiss Super League | 33 | 10 | 1 | 0 | — | | — | | 34 | 10 |
| Neuchâtel Xamax | 2009–10 | Swiss Super League | 17 | 12 | 0 | 0 | — | | — | | 17 | 12 |
| Neuchâtel Xamax | Total | | 55 | 23 | 1 | 0 | — | | — | | 56 | 23 |
| Sochaux | 2009–10 | Ligue 1 | 17 | 2 | 3 | 3 | 0 | 0 | — | | 20 | 5 |
| Sochaux | 2010–11 | Ligue 1 | 35 | 15 | 3 | 2 | 0 | 0 | — | | 38 | 17 |
| Sochaux | Total | | 52 | 17 | 6 | 5 | 0 | 0 | — | | 58 | 22 |
| Dynamo Kyiv | 2011–12 | Ukrainian Premier League | 27 | 12 | 1 | 0 | — | | 10 (Note: Two appearances in UEFA Champions League, eight appearances and two goals in UEFA Europa League) | 2 | 38 | 14 |
| Dynamo Kyiv | 2012–13 | Ukrainian Premier League | 28 | 17 | 1 | 0 | — | | 11 (Note: Ten appearances and four goals in UEFA Champions League, one appearance in UEFA Europa League) | 4 | 39 | 21 |
| Dynamo Kyiv | 2013–14 | Ukrainian Premier League | 19 | 5 | 3 | 3 | — | | 7 (Note: Appearances in UEFA Europa League) | 2 | 37 | 10 |
| Dynamo Kyiv | Total | | 74 | 34 | 5 | 3 | — | | 28 | 8 | 107 | 45 |
| West Bromwich Albion | 2014–15 | Premier League | 24 | 4 | 3 | 2 | 3 | 1 | — | | 30 | 7 |
| West Bromwich Albion | 2015–16 | Premier League | 0 | 0 | 0 | 0 | 1 | 0 | — | | 1 | 0 |
| West Bromwich Albion | Total | | 24 | 4 | 3 | 2 | 4 | 1 | — | | 31 | 7 |
| Olympiacos | 2015–16 | Super League Greece | 23 | 10 | 4 | 2 | — | | 8 (Note: Six appearances and one goal in UEFA Champions League, two appearances in UEFA Europa League) | 1 | 35 | 13 |
| Olympiacos | 2016–17 | Super League Greece | 20 | 13 | 2 | 1 | — | | 8 (Note: Two appearances in UEFA Champions League, six appearances and one goal in UEFA Europa League) | 1 | 30 | 15 |
| Olympiacos | Total | | 43 | 23 | 6 | 3 | — | | 16 | 2 | 65 | 28 |
| Tianjin Teda | 2017 | Chinese Super League | 14 | 4 | 0 | 0 | — | | — | | 14 | 4 |
| Málaga (loan) | 2017–18 | La Liga | 13 | 1 | 0 | 0 | — | | — | | 13 | 1 |
| Aris | 2019–20 | Super League Greece | 22 | 8 | 5 | 2 | — | | 4 | 0 | 31 | 10 |
| Göztepe | 2020–21 | Süper Lig | 30 | 2 | 1 | 1 | — | | — | | 31 | 3 |
| Göztepe | 2021–22 | Süper Lig | 5 | 0 | 0 | 0 | — | | — | | 5 | 0 |
| Göztepe | Total | | 35 | 2 | 1 | 1 | — | | — | | 36 | 3 |
| Al-Yarmouk | 2022–23 | Kuwaiti Division One | 0 | 0 | 0 | 0 | — | | — | | 0 | 0 |
| Career total | | | 364 | 132 | 27 | 16 | 4 | 1 | 48 | 10 | 443 | 159 |

=== International ===
As of match played 31 May 2016. Nigeria score listed first, score column indicates score after each Ideye goal.

International goals by date, venue, cap, opponent, score, result and competition
| No. | Date | Venue | Cap | Opponent | Score | Result | Competition |
|---|---|---|---|---|---|---|---|
| 1 | 14 November 2012 | Marlins Park, Miami, United States | 5 | Venezuela | 1–0 | 3–1 | Friendly |
| 2 | 6 February 2013 | Moses Mabhida Stadium, Durban, South Africa | 11 | Mali | 2–0 | 4–1 | 2013 Africa Cup of Nations |
| 3 | 31 May 2013 | NRG Stadium, Houston, United States | 14 | Mexico | 1–1 | 2–2 | Friendly |
| 4 | 10 September 2013 | Ahmadu Bello Stadium, Kaduna, Nigeria | 20 | Burkina Faso | 1–0 | 4–1 | Friendly |
| 5 | 10 September 2013 | Ahmadu Bello Stadium, Kaduna, Nigeria | 20 | Burkina Faso | 2–0 | 4–1 | Friendly |
| 6 | 31 May 2016 | Stade Josy Barthel, Luxembourg City, Luxembourg | 25 | Luxembourg | 1–0 | 3–1 | Friendly |

== Honours ==
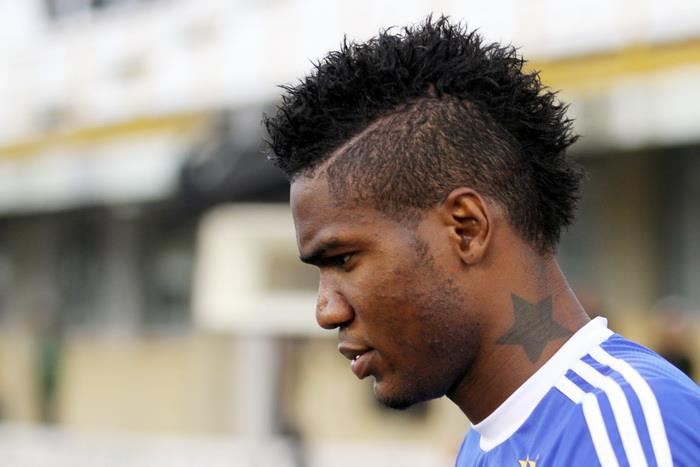
Ideye at the 2014 Ukrainian Cup Final

Ocean Boys

- Nigeria Premier League: 2006

Dynamo Kyiv

- Ukrainian Cup: 2013–14
- Ukrainian Super Cup: 2011

Olympiacos

- Super League Greece: 2015–16
- Greek Cup runner-up: 2015–16

Nigeria

- Africa Cup of Nations: 2013

Individual

- Member of the Order of the Niger
