= Denys Harmash =

Ukrainian footballer

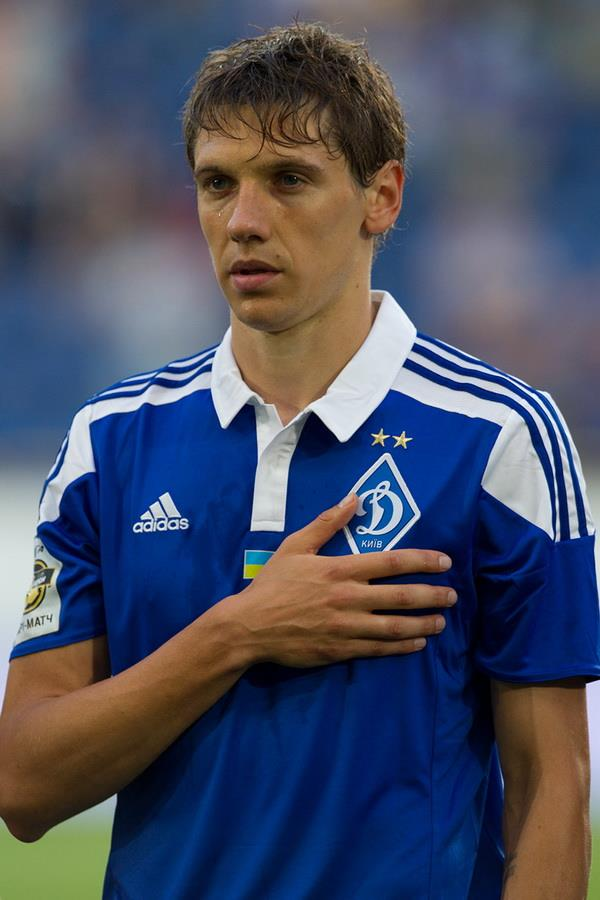
- Harmash playing for Dynamo Kyiv in 2015

Personal information
- Full name: Denys Viktorovych Harmash
- Date of birth: 19 April 1990 (age 36)
- Place of birth: Zorykivka, Luhansk Oblast, Soviet Union (now Ukraine)
- Height: 1.86 m (6 ft 1 in)
- Position: Midfielder

Youth career
- 2003–2005: LVUFK Luhansk
- 2005: Olimpik Donetsk
- 2005–2006: LVUFK Luhansk
- 2006–2007: RVUFK Kyiv

Senior career*
Years	Team	Apps	(Gls)
2007–2023	Dynamo Kyiv	237	(34)
2007	→ Dynamo-3 Kyiv	7	(3)
2007–2009	→ Dynamo-2 Kyiv	55	(9)
2020	→ Çaykur Rizespor (loan)	14	(3)
2023	Osijek	3	(0)
2024	Metalist 1925 Kharkiv	13	(2)
2024–2026	Lisne	11	(0)
2026	Tytan Kyiv	0	(0)

International career^{‡}
2007	Ukraine U17	4	(0)
2007–2009	Ukraine U18	17	(2)
2008–2009	Ukraine U19	13	(3)
2007–2011	Ukraine U21	21	(4)
2011–2021	Ukraine	31	(2)
Medal record
Men's football
Representing Ukraine
UEFA European Under-19 Championship
Winner	2009 Ukraine
- * Club domestic league appearances and goals as of 24 October 2025 ‡ National team caps and goals as of 11 November 2021

Denys Viktorovych Harmash (Ukrainian: Дени́с Ві́кторович Гарма́ш, born 19 April 1990) is a Ukrainian former footballer who played as a midfielder.

== Career ==
=== Club ===
On 6 September 2023, Dynamo Kyiv announced that Harmash had left the club after his contract was terminated by mutual agreement, with Croatian Football League club NK Osijek announced the signing of Harmash to a one-year contract, with the option of an additional year, on the same day.

=== International ===
On 7 October 2011, Harmash made his debut for the senior side of his country in the 3:0 home win against Bulgaria in an exhibition match.

== Career statistics ==
=== Club ===
As of 23 November 2021

Club	Season	League			Cup		Continental		Other		Total	
Club	Season	Division	Apps	Goals	Apps	Goals	Apps	Goals	Apps	Goals	Apps	Goals
Dynamo-3 Kyiv	2006–07	Ukrainian Second League	7	3	—		—		—		7	3
Dynamo-2 Kyiv	2007–08	Ukrainian First League	27	5	—		—		—		27	5
Dynamo-2 Kyiv	2008–09	Ukrainian First League	28	4	—		—		—		28	4
Dynamo-2 Kyiv	Total		55	9	—		—		—		55	9
Dynamo Kyiv	2007–08	Ukrainian Premier League	0	0	1	0	0	0	0	0	1	0
Dynamo Kyiv	2009–10	Ukrainian Premier League	4	0	1	0	0	0	0	0	5	0
Dynamo Kyiv	2010–11	Ukrainian Premier League	20	1	4	0	9 (Note: Three appearances and one goal in the UEFA Champions League, six appearances in the UEFA Europa League)	1	—		33	2
Dynamo Kyiv	2011–12	Ukrainian Premier League	22	1	2	0	8 (Note: One appearance in the UEFA Champions League, seven appearances and one goal in the UEFA Europa League)	1	1 (Note: Appearance in the Ukrainian Super Cup)	0	33	2
Dynamo Kyiv	2012–13	Ukrainian Premier League	23	2	—		10 (Note: Eight appearances in the UEFA Champions League, two appearances in the UEFA Europa League)	0	—		33	2
Dynamo Kyiv	2013–14	Ukrainian Premier League	13	2	3	2	1 (Note: Appearance(s) in the UEFA Europa League)	0	—		17	4
Dynamo Kyiv	2014–15	Ukrainian Premier League	6	0	3	0	1	0	0	0	10	0
Dynamo Kyiv	2015–16	Ukrainian Premier League	19	3	3	2	7 (Note: Appearance(s) in the UEFA Champions League)	1	1	0	30	6
Dynamo Kyiv	2016–17	Ukrainian Premier League	25	9	3	1	3	1	1	0	32	11
Dynamo Kyiv	2017–18	Ukrainian Premier League	26	3	3	1	12 (Note: Two appearances and one goal in the UEFA Champions League, ten appearances and one goal in the UEFA Europa League)	2	1	0	42	6
Dynamo Kyiv	2018–19	Ukrainian Premier League	13	2	2	2	12 (Note: Four appearances in the UEFA Champions League, eight appearances and two goals in the UEFA Europa League)	2	1	0	28	6
Dynamo Kyiv	2019–20	Ukrainian Premier League	13	0	1	0	5 (Note: Four appearances in the UEFA Europa League and one appearance in UEFA Champions League)	0	1	1	20	1
Dynamo Kyiv	2020–21	Ukrainian Premier League	12	3	1	0	5 (Note: Five appearances in the UEFA Europa League)	0	0	0	18	3
Dynamo Kyiv	2021–22	Ukrainian Premier League	17	7	1	0	6	1	1	0	25	8
Dynamo Kyiv	2022–23	Ukrainian Premier League	24	1	0	0	9 (Note: Five appearances in the UEFA Europa League and four appearances in the UEFA Champions League)	2	0	0	33	3
Dynamo Kyiv	Total		237	34	28	8	88	11	7	1	360	54
Çaykur Rizespor (loan)	2019–20	Süper Lig	14	3	2	0	—		—		16	3
Osijek	2023–24	Croatian Football League	3	0	1	0	—		—		0	0
Career total			313	49	30	8	88	11	7	1	438	69

=== International ===
As of 11 November 2021

National Team	Year	Caps	Goals
Ukraine	2011	3	0
Ukraine	2012	7	0
Ukraine	2013	4	1
Ukraine	2014	2	0
Ukraine	2015	8	1
Ukraine	2016	4	0
Ukraine	2017	2	0
Ukraine	2021	1	0
Total		31	2

=== International goals ===
As of 11 June 2019

Scores and results list Ukraine's goal tally first.

No	Date	Venue	Opponent	Score	Result	Competition
1.	7 June 2013	Podgorica City Stadium, Podgorica, Montenegro	Montenegro	1–0	4–0	2014 FIFA World Cup qualification
2.	14 June 2015	Arena Lviv, Lviv, Ukraine	Luxembourg	2–0	3–0	Euro 2016 qualification

== Honours ==
Dynamo Kyiv

- Ukrainian Premier League: 2014–15, 2015–16, 2020–21
- Ukrainian Cup: 2013–14, 2014–15, 2019–20, 2020–21
- Ukrainian Super Cup: 2009, 2011, 2016, 2018, 2019, 2020

Ukraine U19

- UEFA European Under-19 Championship: 2009

Individual

- Ukrainian Premier League player of the Month (2): 2021–22 (September), 2021–22 (October)

== Personal ==
Harmash's car was shot at in Kyiv on 5 December 2017, no casualties were reported.
