= Dudu (footballer, born 1992) =

Brazilian footballer

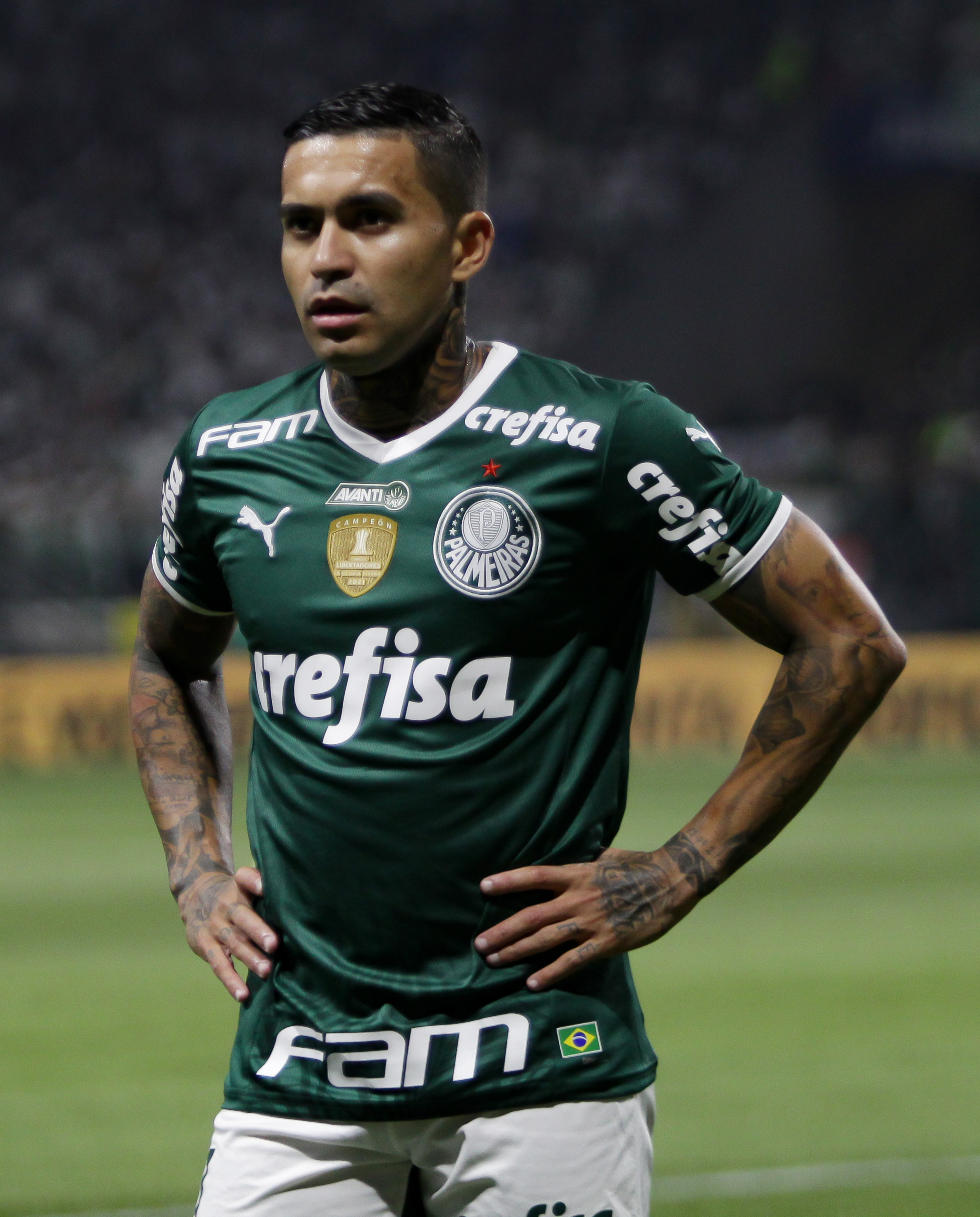
- Dudu playing for Palmeiras in 2022

Personal information
- Full name: Eduardo Pereira Rodrigues
- Date of birth: 7 January 1992 (age 34)
- Place of birth: Goiânia, Brazil
- Height: 1.66 m (5 ft 5 in)
- Positions: Winger; attacking midfielder

Team information
- Current team: Atlético Mineiro
- Number: 92

Youth career
- 2003–2004: Atlético Goianiense
- 2005–2010: Cruzeiro

Senior career*
Years	Team	Apps	(Gls)
2009–2011	Cruzeiro	21	(2)
2010	→ Coritiba (loan)	21	(0)
2011–2014	Dynamo Kyiv	24	(2)
2014	→ Grêmio (loan)	45	(6)
2015–2024	Palmeiras	358	(73)
2020–2021	→ Al-Duhail (loan)	22	(14)
2025	Cruzeiro	14	(2)
2025–	Atlético Mineiro	35	(6)

International career
2009	Brazil U-17	8	(0)
2011	Brazil U-20	7	(3)
2011–2017	Brazil	3	(1)
- * Club domestic league appearances and goals as of 7 April 2026

Eduardo Pereira Rodrigues (born 7 January 1992), commonly known as Dudu, is a Brazilian professional footballer who plays as an attacking midfielder and winger for Atlético Mineiro.

== Career ==
=== Early career ===
Dudu began his career in the youth side for Cruzeiro and earned on 14 June 2009 his first cap in the Campeonato Brasileiro Série A against Palmeiras. On 27 April 2010, Coritiba signed the 18-year-old attacking midfielder on loan from Cruzeiro until December 2010.

Dudu returned to Cruzeiro for the 2011 season. On 25 June in the match against Coritiba Dudu, playing as a substitute, surprised the coach Joel Santana, who said: "Dudu entered really well in the match. He is such a bold boy, intelligent, he doesn't forget the instructions. He is audacious, even being a little guy. It proves that tallness isn't really important for football. Quality, ability and competence are. He showed he is such a competent player, in spite of his young age."

=== Dynamo Kyiv ===
On 27 August 2011, it was announced on his team Cruzeiro's official homepage that Dudu would join Ukrainian side Dynamo Kyiv on a €5 million offer.

=== Grêmio ===
On 11 February 2014, Dudu was loaned to Grêmio until the end of the Brazilian season, on 31 December 2014.

=== Palmeiras ===
After almost being signed by Corinthians, on 11 January 2015 Dudu joined rival Palmeiras on a four-year contract. While being among the most important players in the squad, Dudu was also criticised by the fans due to his temperamental behavior on the pitch, which included being sent-off during the 2015 Campeonato Paulista finals after hitting the referee. He helped Palmeiras win the 2015 Copa do Brasil, by scoring twice in the final match against Santos. By the start of the 2016 season, the attitude problems were no longer an issue as Dudu took over as club captain following an elbow injury from former captain Fernando Prass. He then led the team to another title, the 2016 Campeonato Brasileiro, the ninth in the club's history.

In March 2018, he extended his contract until 2022. After the arrival of Roger Machado as the new head coach, Dudu was no longer wearing the armband for the team, while still being a regular starter on the left side of the attack.

==== Loan to Al-Duhail ====
Dudu spent the 2020–21 season on loan at Qatar Stars League side Al-Duhail, making 35 appearances and scoring 15 goals across all competitions.

==== Return to Palmeiras ====
In July 2021, Dudu returned to Palmeiras ahead of the 2021 Copa Libertadores final stages, appearing in seven matches and scoring twice in the team's winning campaign. He also played an important role in the team's 2022 Campeonato Brasileiro Série A title, appearing in all 38 rounds, scoring seven goals and receiving his fifth nomination to the Bola de Prata team of the year award.

=== Return to Cruzeiro ===
On 23 December 2024, it was announced the return of Dudu to Cruzeiro on a three-year deal. On 26 April 2025, after getting into a public dispute with team manager Leonardo Jardim for being relegated to the bench in recent matches, Dudu was barred from first team activities indefinitely. On 2 May, he and Cruzeiro reached an agreement for the termination of his contract.

=== Atlético Mineiro ===
On 6 May 2025, Dudu joined Atlético Mineiro on a deal running until December 2027.

== International career ==
On 28 October 2011, while playing for Dynamo, Dudu was called up to the senior team by manager Mano Menezes for friendlies against Gabon and Egypt. He made his national debut against Gabon on 10 November.

== Career statistics ==
=== Club ===
As of 15 December 2025

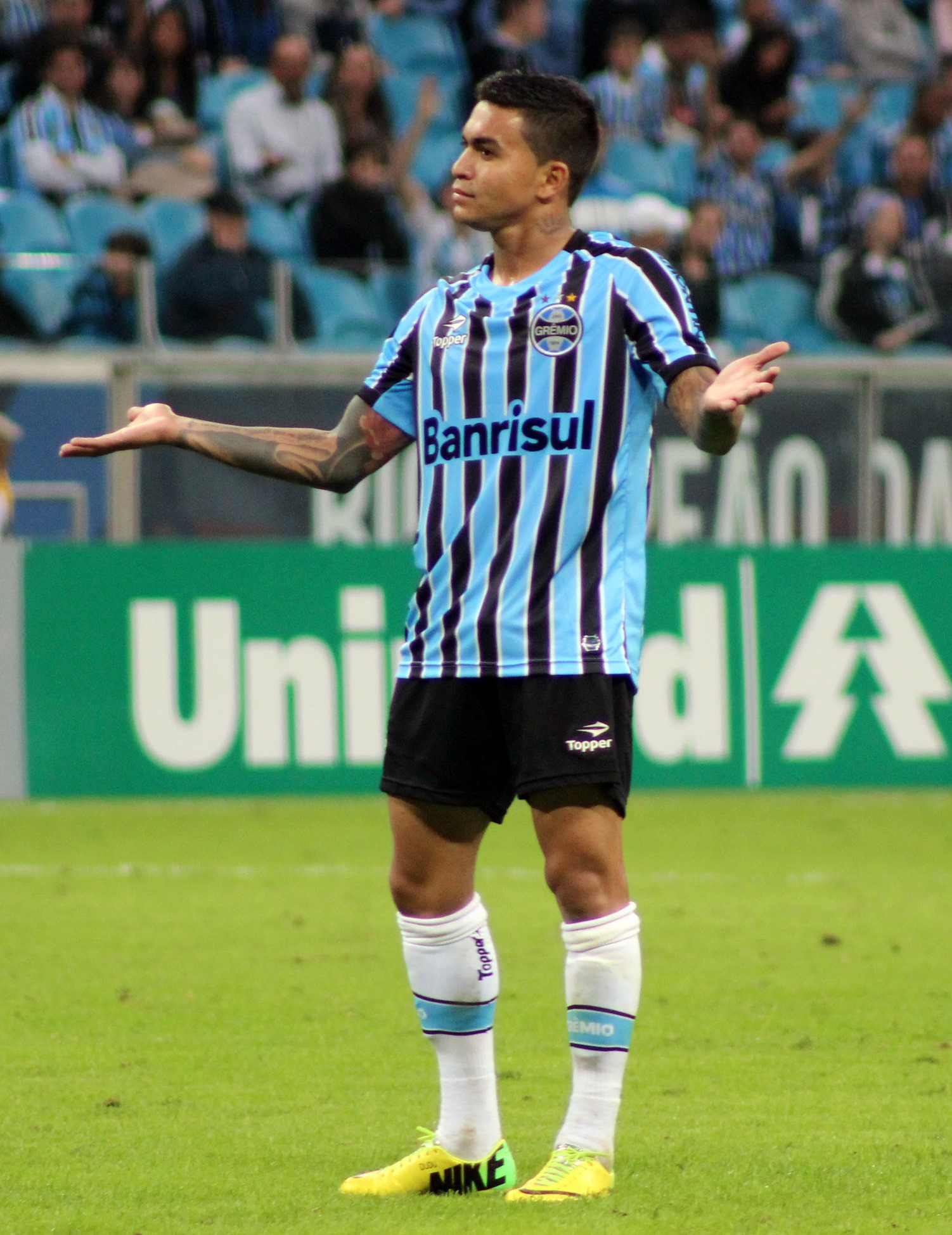
Dudu with Grêmio in 2014

Club	Season	League			State League		National Cup		Continental		Other		Total	
Club	Season	Division	Apps	Goals	Apps	Goals	Apps	Goals	Apps	Goals	Apps	Goals	Apps	Goals
Cruzeiro	2009	Série A	6	0	—		—		—		—		6	0
Cruzeiro	2010	Série A	0	0	1	0	0	0	0	0	—		1	0
Cruzeiro	2011	Série A	6	0	8	2	—		4 (Note: Appearance(s) in Copa Libertadores)	0	—		18	2
Cruzeiro	Total		12	0	9	2	0	0	4	0	—		25	2
Coritiba (loan)	2010	Série B	21	0	—		—		—		—		21	0
Dynamo Kyiv	2011–12	UPL	4	1	—		1	1	1 (Note: Appearance(s) in UEFA Europa League)	0	0	0	6	2
Dynamo Kyiv	2012–13	UPL	13	1	—		0	0	2 (Note: Appearance(s) in UEFA Champions League)	0	0	0	15	1
Dynamo Kyiv	2013–14	UPL	7	0	—		1	1	3	0	0	0	11	1
Dynamo Kyiv	Total		24	2	—		2	2	6	0	0	0	32	4
Grêmio	2014	Série A	35	3	10	3	1	0	7	2	—		53	8
Palmeiras	2015	Série A	28	10	16	3	11	3	—		—		55	16
Palmeiras	2016	Série A	33	6	12	3	2	0	4	0	—		51	9
Palmeiras	2017	Série A	26	9	14	4	4	2	7	1	—		51	16
Palmeiras	2018	Série A	31	7	17	4	5	1	11	2	—		64	14
Palmeiras	2019	Série A	36	9	14	2	4	0	10	2	—		64	13
Palmeiras	2020	Série A	0	0	8	2	0	0	2	0	—		10	2
Palmeiras	2021	Série A	21	2	—		—		7	2	2 (Note: Appearance(s) in FIFA Club World Cup)	1	30	5
Palmeiras	2022	Série A	38	7	12	2	4	0	10	1	2 (Note: Appearance(s) in Recopa Sudamericana)	0	66	10
Palmeiras	2023	Série A	14	3	14	0	5	0	8	0	1 (Note: Appearance in Supercopa do Brasil)	0	42	3
Palmeiras	2024	Série A	18	0	0	0	1	0	0	0	0	0	19	0
Palmeiras	Total		245	53	107	20	36	6	59	8	5	1	452	88
Al-Duhail (loan)	2020–21	QSL	22	14	—		2	1	4 (Note: Appearance(s) in AFC Champions League)	0	7 (Note: Three appearances in Emir of Qatar Cup, two appearances in FIFA Club World Cup, two appearances in Qatar Cup)	0	35	15
Cruzeiro	2025	Série A	5	1	9	1	0	0	3 (Note: Appearance(s) in Copa Sudamericana)	0	—		17	2
Atlético Mineiro	2025	Série A	18	3	—		2	0	6	1	—		26	4
Career total			382	76	135	26	43	9	89	11	12	1	661	123

=== International ===
Appearances and goals by national team and year
National team	Year	Apps	Goals
Brazil	2011	2	0
Brazil	2017	1	1
Total		3	1

International goals

Brazil score listed first, score column indicates score after each Dudu goal.

No.	Date	Venue	Cap	Opponent	Score	Result	Competition
1	26 January 2017	Estádio Olímpico Nilton Santos, Rio de Janeiro, Brazil	3	Colombia	1–0	1–0	Friendly

== Honours ==
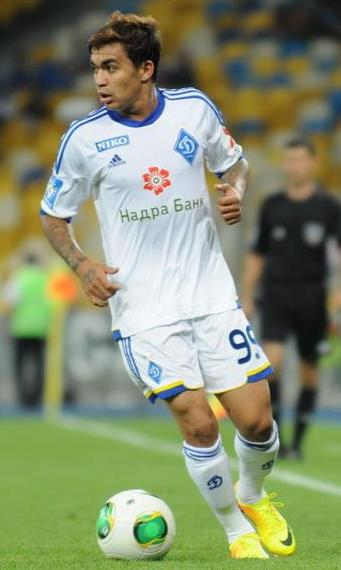
Dudu with Dynamo Kyiv in 2013

=== Club ===
Coritiba

- Campeonato Brasileiro Série B: 2010

Cruzeiro

- Campeonato Mineiro: 2011

Dynamo Kyiv

- Ukrainian Cup: 2013-14

Palmeiras

- Campeonato Brasileiro Série A: 2016, 2018, 2022, 2023
- Copa do Brasil: 2015
- Copa Libertadores: 2020, 2021
- Campeonato Paulista: 2020, 2022, 2023, 2024
- Recopa Sudamericana: 2022
- Supercopa do Brasil: 2023
- FIFA Club World Cup Runner Up: 2021

=== International ===
Brazil U20

- FIFA U-20 World Cup: 2011

Brazil U17

- South American U-17 Championship: 2009

=== Individual ===
- Bola de Ouro: 2018
- Bola de Prata: 2016, 2017, 2018, 2019, 2022
- Campeonato Brasileiro Série A Best Player: 2018
- Campeonato Brasileiro Série A Team of the Year: 2016, 2018
- Campeonato Brasileiro Série A top assist provider: 2016, 2018
- Best Winger in Brazil: 2018
- Campeonato Paulista Best Player: 2022
- Campeonato Paulista Team of the Year: 2018, 2019, 2022
- Copa Libertadores Dream Team: 2018, 2021
- South American Team of the Year: 2018
- FIFA Club World Cup Silver Ball: 2021

== Controversies ==
On 18 July 2025, Brazilian forward Dudu of Atlético Mineiro was handed a six-match ban and a R$90,000 fine by the Superior Tribunal de Justiça Desportiva (STJD) for misogynistic remarks he had posted on social media in 2023 about Palmeiras president Leila Pereira; the unanimous ruling, triggered by a complaint from the União Brasileira de Mulheres and featuring Pereira’s testimony, prompted Atlético Mineiro to seek a provisional suspension (efeito suspensivo) so the player could participate until a plenary appeal is heard, while both parties pursue parallel civil lawsuits alleging defamation and moral damages.
