= Taras Pinchuk =

Ukrainian footballer (born 1989)

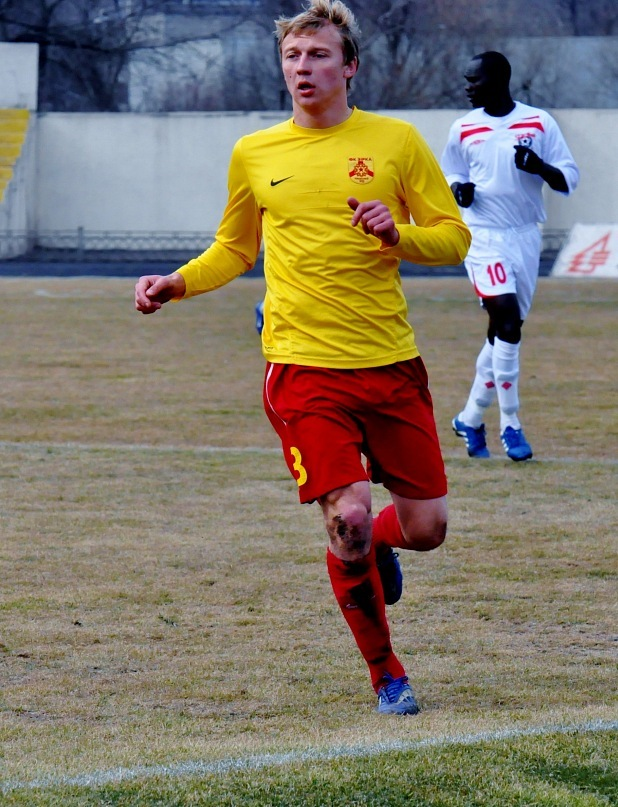

Personal information
- Full name: Taras Volodymyrovych Pinchuk
- Date of birth: 27 April 1989 (age 37)
- Place of birth: Kyiv, Ukrainian SSR
- Height: 1.82 m (5 ft 11 1/2 in)
- Position: Defender

Team information
- Current team: Livyi Bereh Kyiv
- Number: 2

Youth career
- 2002–2006: Dynamo Kyiv

Senior career*
Years	Team	Apps	(Gls)
2006–2012	Dynamo Kyiv	0	(0)
2006–2008	→ Dynamo-2 Kyiv	36	(0)
2007	→ Dynamo-3 Kyiv	8	(1)
2010–2012	→ Zirka Kirovohrad (loan)	65	(0)
2012–2013	Zirka Kirovohrad	40	(0)
2014–2015	Helios Kharkiv	27	(0)
2015–2018	Obolon-Brovar Kyiv	77	(0)
2018	Sumy	6	(0)
2018–2020	Veres Rivne	41	(0)
2021–	Livyi Bereh Kyiv	12	(2)

International career^{‡}
2004	Ukraine U15	3	(0)
2004–2005	Ukraine U16	15	(0)
2006	Ukraine U17	6	(0)
2006–2007	Ukraine U18	10	(0)
2007–2008	Ukraine U19	16	(0)
2013	Ukraine students		
- * Club domestic league appearances and goals as of 27 October 2021 ‡ National team caps and goals as of 27 October 2021

Taras Pinchuk (Ukrainian: Тарас Володимирович Пінчук; born 27 April 1989) is a professional Ukrainian football defender.

He is product of FC Dynamo Kyiv sportive school. He became on loan for Zirka Kirovohrad in Ukrainian First League from July 2010.

In January 2014 he became a free agent.
