= Lukman Haruna =

Nigerian footballer (born 1990)

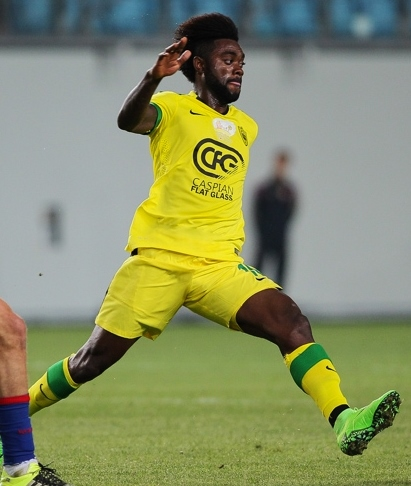

Personal information
- Full name: Lukman Abdulkarim Haruna
- Date of birth: 4 December 1990 (age 35)
- Place of birth: Lagos, Nigeria
- Height: 1.79 m (5 ft 10 1/2 in)
- Position: Midfielder

Youth career
- 2007–2009: Monaco

Senior career*
Years	Team	Apps	(Gls)
2009–2011	Monaco	44	(3)
2011–2017	Dynamo Kyiv	50	(8)
2015	→ Hoverla Uzhhorod (loan)	5	(0)
2015	→ Anzhi Makhachkala (loan)	12	(1)
2016	→ Astana (loan)	10	(1)
2018	Palanga	8	(0)
2019	Tataouine	2	(1)
2019–2020	Ararat Yerevan	5	(0)
Total		136	(14)

International career
2007	Nigeria U17	5	(1)
2009	Nigeria U20	2	(0)
2008–2016	Nigeria	13	(3)
- * Club domestic league appearances and goals

Lukman Abdulkarim Haruna (born 4 December 1990) is a Nigerian former footballer who played as a midfielder.

== Club career ==
In December 2007, AS Monaco signed Haruna on a four-year contract.

In June 2011, he signed a five-year contract with FC Dynamo Kyiv.

In July 2015, Haruna moved to FC Anzhi Makhachkala on a loan deal from Dynamo Kyiv until the end of 2015. Anzhi decided not to extend the loan after it ended.

On 3 April 2016, Haruna joined FC Astana on loan until 30 June 2016.

After trials with FK Vardar, RC Lens and Odense Boldklub, Haruna joined Lithuanian A Lyga club FK Palanga in March 2018.

In July 2019, Haruna joined Tunisian Ligue Professionnelle 1 club US Tataouine.

On 12 December 2019, FC Ararat Yerevan announced the signing of Haruna.

== International career ==
Haruna was part of the Nigerian team that won the 2007 FIFA U-17 World Cup held in South Korea. In 2010, he was part of the Nigerian 23-man squad in the 2010 FIFA World Cup in South Africa.

== Career statistics ==
=== Club ===
As of Match played 31 May 2020

Appearances and goals by club, season and competition
Club	Season	League			National Cup		League Cup		Continental		Other		Total	
Club	Season	Division	Apps	Goals	Apps	Goals	Apps	Goals	Apps	Goals	Apps	Goals	Apps	Goals
AS Monaco	2008–09	Ligue 1	4	0	0	0	0	0	–		–		4	0
AS Monaco	2009–10	Ligue 1	23	3	5	1	0	0	–		–		28	4
AS Monaco	2010–11	Ligue 1	17	0	1	0	1	0	–		–		19	0
AS Monaco	Total		44	3	6	1	1	0	–		–		51	4
Dynamo Kyiv	2011–12	Ukrainian Premier League	14	0	1	0	–		7	0	1	0	23	0
Dynamo Kyiv	2012–13	Ukrainian Premier League	18	5	0	0	–		5	1	–		23	6
Dynamo Kyiv	2013–14	Ukrainian Premier League	18	3	2	1	–		5	0	–		25	4
Dynamo Kyiv	2014–15	Ukrainian Premier League	0	0	0	0	–		0	0	1	0	1	0
Dynamo Kyiv	2015–16	Ukrainian Premier League	0	0	0	0	–		0	0	0	0	0	0
Dynamo Kyiv	2016–17	Ukrainian Premier League	0	0	0	0	–		0	0	0	0	0	0
Dynamo Kyiv	Total		50	8	3	1	–		17	1	2	0	72	10
Hoverla Uzhhorod (loan)	2014–15	Ukrainian Premier League	5	0	0	0	–		–		–		5	0
Anzhi Makhachkala (loan)	2015–16	Russian Premier League	12	1	1	0	–		–		–		13	1
Astana (loan)	2016	Kazakhstan Premier League	10	1	2	0	–		0	0	0	0	12	1
Palanga	2018	A Lyga	8	0	0	0	–		–		–		8	0
Ararat Yerevan	2019–20	Armenian Premier League	5	0	0	0	–		–		–		5	0
Career total			134	13	12	2	1	0	17	1	2	0	166	16

=== International ===
Nigeria
Year	Apps	Goals
2008	2	0
2010	5	1
2015	1	0
Total	8	1

Statistics accurate as of match played 5 September 2015

#	Date	Venue	Opponent	Score	Result	Competition
1.	30 May 2010	Stadium mk, Milton Keynes, England	Colombia	1–1	1–1	Friendly
Updated 15 July 2015.

== Honours ==
Dynamo Kyiv

- Ukrainian Cup: 2013–14

Astana

- Kazakhstan Premier League: 2016
- Kazakhstan Cup: 2016

Nigeria U17

- FIFA U-17 World Cup: 2007
