= Maksym Koval (footballer) =

Ukrainian footballer (born 1992)

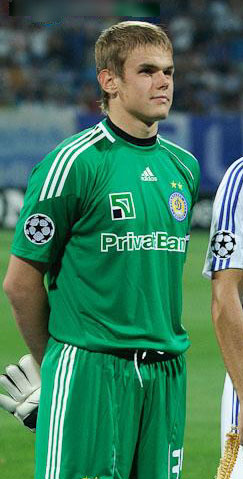
- Koval with Dynamo Kyiv in 2010

Personal information
- Full name: Maksym Anatoliyovych Koval
- Date of birth: 9 December 1992 (age 33)
- Place of birth: Zaporizhzhia, Ukraine
- Height: 1.90 m (6 ft 3 in)
- Position: Goalkeeper

Team information
- Current team: Chornomorets Odesa
- Number: 35

Youth career
- 2004–2008: Metalurh Zaporizhzhia Youth

Senior career*
Years	Team	Apps	(Gls)
2008–2010	Metalurh Zaporizhzhia	22	(0)
2008	→ Metalurh-2 Zaporizhzhia	18	(0)
2010–2019	Dynamo Kyiv	74	(0)
2014–2015	→ Hoverla Uzhhorod (loan)	21	(0)
2015–2016	→ OB (loan)	10	(0)
2018	→ Deportivo La Coruña (loan)	2	(0)
2018–2019	→ Al-Fateh (loan)	29	(0)
2019–2022	Al-Fateh	75	(0)
2022–2024	Sheriff Tiraspol	13	(0)
2024	Aris	0	(0)
2024	→ Kalamata (loan)	16	(0)
2024–2026	Yelimay	37	(0)
2026–	Chornomorets Odesa	2	(0)

International career^{‡}
2008–2009	Ukraine U17	8	(0)
2009	Ukraine U18	1	(0)
2010–2011	Ukraine U19	6	(0)
2010	Ukraine U20	1	(0)
2010–2012	Ukraine U21	11	(0)
2012	Ukraine	2	(0)
Medal record
Men's football
Representing Ukraine
UEFA European Under-19 Championship
Winner	2009 Ukraine
- * Club domestic league appearances and goals as of 28 March 2026 ‡ National team caps and goals as of 10 November 2017

Maksym Anatoliyovych Koval (Ukrainian: Максим Анатолійович Коваль; born 9 December 1992) is a Ukrainian professional footballer who plays as a goalkeeper for Ukrainian club Chornomorets Odesa.

== Club career ==
=== FC Metalurh Zaporizhzhia ===
==== 2009–10 ====
Koval is a product of Metalurh Zaporizhzhia Youth school system. He first appeared on the bench for the first team on 26 July 2009. He was there for just 5 games before he was given his chance. Mainly due to the number of absentees, he appeared in goal for Round 12 of the Ukrainian Premier League on 1 November; He kept a clean sheet in a 3–0 win. After a fine performance, he kept his place for the next two games, keeping two more clean sheets in the process. Even when he did concede, it was only a single goal in a 1–1 draw with Dynamo Kyiv, a game in which he also saved a 94th minute penalty kick from Artem Milevskyi, saving the point. Metalurg's form rose, and he kept his place from then on. A 0–4 drubbing by Metalist was the only real blip on his seasons performance. He ended with 6 clean sheets and having only conceded 23 in 19 games.

=== Dynamo Kyiv ===
==== 2010–11 ====
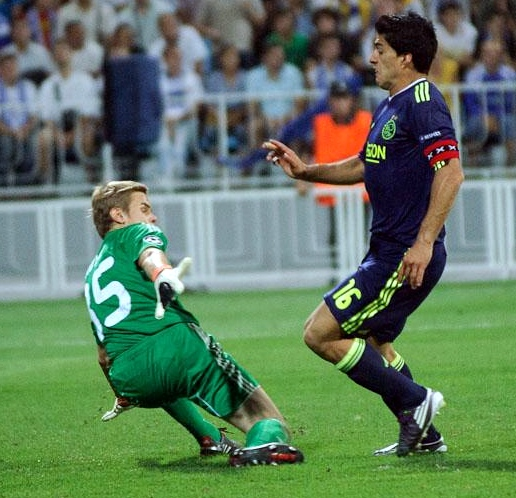
Koval on his debut with Ajax's Luis Suárez.

After a fine debut season, starting whilst he was aged just 16, Dynamo Kyiv showed interest. This was intensified after a superb performance against them during the season. He signed for them just 3 games into the 2010–11 season.

He made his debut for Dynamo in a UEFA Champions League play-off game against AFC Ajax, and with an impressive performance subsequently established himself as the first-choice goalkeeper with his new club in the absence of the injured Oleksandr Shovkovskyi, at the age of only 17. When Shovkovskyi returned from injury in the second half of the 2010–2011 season, Koval was moved to the back-up goalkeeper position.

In November 2010, Koval was named by Spanish football magazine, Don Balón as one of the 100 best young players in the world alongside David de Gea, who had recently moved to Manchester United.

==== 2011–12 ====
He was a substitute goalkeeper throughout the 2011–2012 season, making just 5 appearances up until mid-late April. He kept clean sheets in 4 of them, and conceded 1 in a 6–1 thrashing of FC Zorya Luhansk in October. However, at the end of April, he got a breakthrough, and due to injury to Oleksandr Shovkovskyi (and injury that would rule him out of Euro 2012) he played in the final 3 matches. Coming on initially as a halftime substitute away at Volyn Lutsk, he kept a 5th clean sheet of the season. Next up was Zorya Luhansk again, an though there was not to be a thrashing on this occasion, Koval kept a 6th clean sheet in 7 appearances, and Dynamo drew 0–0. His final chance to impress was against Tavriya Simferopol on 10 May. The game started well with Dynamo taking the lead, only for Koval to rush from his line as the opposing player made a dash forward, and foul him just outside the box with a poor tackle. He was sent off for preventing a clear goal scoring opportunity. In the 2011–12 season, he also made a single appearance in Ukrainian Cup (conceding 2 in a 3–2 win) and Europa League (conceding 3 in a 3–3 win).

==== 2012–13 ====
For the upcoming 2012–2013 season, it is widely thought that he will become the first choice keeper. As of 22 August 2012, he has started in all 7 of Dynamo Kyiv's opening games. In the 4 league games he has conceded 2 goals in 4 games, keeping 2 clean sheets. In the champions league he conceded 1 in a 2–1 home win over Feyenoord, and kept a clean sheet in the surprise 1–0 away win. He then went on to concede just once and make a string of saves in a shock 3–1 away win over Borussia Mönchengladbach.

==== 2014–15: loan to Hoverla Uzhhorod ====
On 6 August 2014, Koval was loaned out to Hoverla Uzhhorod until the end of 2014. On 3 March 2015, after participating in Dynamo's winter training camp, it was announced that Koval will return to Hoverla until the end of the season.

==== 2015–16: loan to Odense Boldklub ====
On 30 August 2015, Koval was loaned out to Danish club Odense Boldklub for a season long loan.

==== 2017–18: loan to Deportivo La Coruña ====
On 20 January 2018, Koval joined Spanish La Liga side Deportivo La Coruña on loan for the remainder of the season, in a deal that included a buyout option.

==== 2018–19: loan to Al-Fateh ====
On 23 July 2018, it was announced that Koval will spend the upcoming 2018-19 season with the Saudi Professional League club Al-Fateh.

=== Al Fateh ===
At the end of the loan period, Al Fateh was able to buy Koval's transfer from Dynamo Kyiv and signed the goalkeeper to a three-year deal. He left the club following the expiration of his contract on 30 June 2022.

=== Sheriff Tiraspol ===
On 13 August 2022, Sheriff Tiraspol announced the signing of Koval. On 10 January 2024, Sheriff announced the departure of Koval alongside Henrique Luvannor.

=== Aris Thessaloniki ===
On 13 January 2024, Aris Thessaloniki announced the signing of Koval to a 2.5-year contract, whilst also loaning him out to Kalamata until the end of the current season.

=== Elimai ===
On 13 January 2024, Elimai announced the signing of Koval on a free transfer from Aris Thessaloniki.

=== Chornomorets Odesa ===
On 10 February 2026, Chornomorets Odesa announced the signing of Koval. As a player for Chornomorets, he made his official debut against UCSA Tarasivka on 21 March 2026.

== International career ==
Koval was called up to the senior national team in June 2011 for matches against Uzbekistan and France, but did not play in any of these games. He finally made his debut on 1 June 2012, as a second-half substitute in the 2–3 loss against Austria in a friendly match. Koval was included in Ukraine's squad for the UEFA Euro 2012 tournament on home soil.

== Career statistics ==
=== Club ===
As of 24 June 2019

Club	Season	League			Cup (Note: Includes the Ukrainian Cup, Danish Cup, and King Cup)		Continental		Other		Total	
Club	Season	Division	Apps	Goals	Apps	Goals	Apps	Goals	Apps	Goals	Apps	Goals
Metalurh Zaporizhzhia	2009–10	Ukrainian Premier League	19	0	0	0	–		–		19	0
Metalurh Zaporizhzhia	2010–11	Ukrainian Premier League	3	0	0	0	–		–		3	0
Metalurh Zaporizhzhia	Total		22	0	0	0	0	0	0	0	22	0
Dynamo Kyiv	2010–11	Ukrainian Premier League	12	0	1	0	5 (Note: Two appearances in the UEFA Champions League, three appearances in the UEFA Europa League)	0	–		18	0
Dynamo Kyiv	2011–12	Ukrainian Premier League	8	0	1	0	1 (Note: Appearances in the UEFA Europa League)	0	0	0	10	0
Dynamo Kyiv	2012–13	Ukrainian Premier League	23	0	0	0	10 (Note: Eight appearances in the UEFA Champions League, two appearances in the UEFA Europa League)	0	–		33	0
Dynamo Kyiv	2013–14	Ukrainian Premier League	13	0	2	0	4	0	–		19	0
Dynamo Kyiv	2014–15	Ukrainian Premier League	0	0	0	0	0	0	0	0	0	0
Dynamo Kyiv	2015–16	Ukrainian Premier League	0	0	0	0	0	0	0	0	0	0
Dynamo Kyiv	2016–17	Ukrainian Premier League	7	0	2	0	0	0	0	0	9	0
Dynamo Kyiv	2017–18	Ukrainian Premier League	11	0	0	0	7 (Note: Two appearances in the UEFA Champions League, five appearances in the UEFA Europa League)	0	0	0	18	0
Dynamo Kyiv	2018–19	Ukrainian Premier League	0	0	0	0	0	0	0	0	0	0
Dynamo Kyiv	Total		74	0	6	0	27	0	0	0	107	0
Hoverla Uzhhorod (loan)	2014–15	Ukrainian Premier League	21	0	3	0	–		–		24	0
OB (loan)	2015–16	Superliga	10	0	1	0	–		–		11	0
Deportivo La Coruña (loan)	2017–18	La Liga	2	0	0	0	–		–		2	0
Al-Fateh (loan)	2018–19	Saudi Professional League	29	0	1	0	–		–		30	0
Al-Fateh	2019–20	Saudi Professional League	18	0	2	0	–		–		20	0
Al-Fateh	2020–21	Saudi Professional League	29	0	3	0	–		–		32	0
Al-Fateh	2021–22	Saudi Professional League	28	0	1	0	–		–		29	0
Al-Fateh	Total		75	0	6	0	-	-	-	-	81	0
Sheriff Tiraspol	2022–23	Super Liga	5	0	5	0	9 (Note: Zero appearances in the UEFA Champions League, five appearances in the UEFA Europa League, and four appearances in the UEFA Europa Conference League)	0	–		19	0
Sheriff Tiraspol	2023–24	Super Liga	8	0	0	0	14 (Note: Four appearances in the UEFA Champions League, and ten appearances in the UEFA Europa League)	0	–		22	0
Sheriff Tiraspol	Total		13	0	5	0	23	0	-	-	41	0
Career total			246	0	22	0	50	0	0	0	318	0

== Honours ==
=== Club ===
Dynamo Kyiv

- Ukrainian Cup: 2013–14

Chornomorets Odesa

- Ukrainian First League runner-up: 2025–26

=== Individual ===
- Ukraine's best young (Under-21) football player (according to Golden talent of Ukraine): April 2013, July 2013
