= Oleh Husiev =

Ukrainian footballer and coach

Oleh Husiev Олег Гусєв
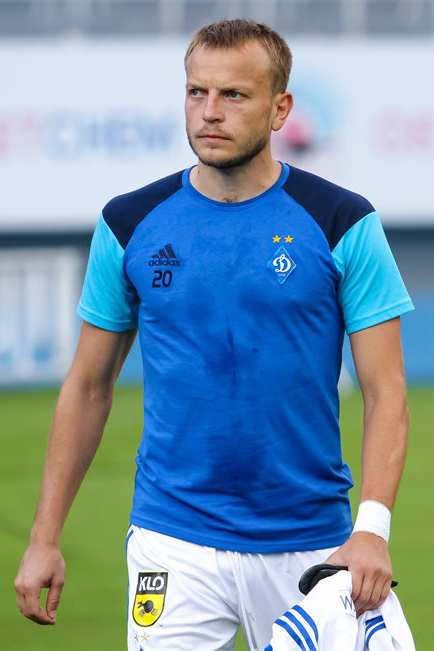
- Husiev with Dynamo Kyiv in 2017

Personal information
- Full name: Oleh Anatoliiovych Husiev
- Date of birth: 25 April 1983 (age 43)
- Place of birth: Stepanivka, Sumy Oblast, Ukrainian SSR, Soviet Union
- Height: 1.79 m (5 ft 10 in)
- Positions: Right midfielder; right back

Team information
- Current team: Dynamo Kyiv (assistant)

Youth career
- DYuSSh Stepanivka
- -2000: SDYuShOR Zmina Sumy

Senior career*
Years	Team	Apps	(Gls)
2000–2002	Frunzenets-Liha-99 Sumy	64	(17)
2002	Borysfen Boryspil	1	(0)
2002–2003	Arsenal Kyiv	23	(1)
2003–2018	Dynamo Kyiv	296	(57)
Total		384	(75)

International career^{‡}
2003	Ukraine U21	8	(2)
2003–2016	Ukraine	98	(13)

Managerial career
- 2018–2020: Dynamo Kyiv U-21 (assistant)
- 2020–: Dynamo Kyiv (assistant)
- * Club domestic league appearances and goals as of 19 May 2018 ‡ National team caps and goals as of 13 June 2017

Oleh Anatoliiovych Husiev (Ukrainian: Олег Анатолійович Гусєв; born 25 April 1983) is a Ukrainian retired footballer who played as a midfielder for FC Dynamo Kyiv. He mainly played as a right midfielder or a right-back.

He made over 250 Ukrainian Premier League appearances for Dynamo, winning the league three times in addition to four Ukrainian Cups and five Ukrainian Super Cups.

A full international since 2003, Husiev earned over 95 caps, making him the nation's fourth-most capped player and fourth-highest international goalscorer of all time. He represented Ukraine at the 2006 FIFA World Cup and UEFA Euro 2012.

== Club career ==
Husiev transferred to Dynamo in the summer of 2003. Following his strong display in the 2006 FIFA World Cup, he was linked with a move to French side Olympique Lyonnais. However, Dynamo Kyiv President Ihor Surkis stated that Husiev, along with fellow players Artem Milevskyi and Ruslan Rotan, are "the future of Dynamo Kyiv".

On 30 March 2014, Husiev suffered a knee to the head from goalkeeper Denys Boyko (on loan from Dynamo Kyiv to Dnipro) grabbing a ball in midair, this collision knocked him to the ground, where he laid motionless for a few seconds before one of the Dnipro midfielders, Jaba Kankava, ran over to open Husiev's mouth and moved his tongue to allow Husiev to breathe. Kankava is credited with possibly saving Husiev's life.

On 20 September 2015, Husiev scored a penalty in a 0–2 away win against Volyn Lutsk in the Ukrainian Premier League, which was marked as his 100th competitive senior goal.

Having left Dynamo Kyiv in December 2016, Husiev returned to Dynamo on 13 June 2017, signing a one-year contract. In 2018 it was announced that he is attending coaching class at the Kyiv Oblast Football Federation.

== International career ==
Husiev made his senior international debut for Ukraine on 20 August 2003, replacing fellow debutant Serhiy Tkachenko at half time in a 0–2 friendly defeat to Romania at the Shakhtar Stadium in Donetsk. He scored his first goal for the team on 17 November 2004, opening a 3–0 away win over Turkey in the ninth minute, for 2006 World Cup qualification. Husiev played all five of Ukraine's games as they reached the quarter-finals at their first World Cup in Germany, scoring the winner in their last-16 penalty shootout against Switzerland. He also played all of their matches as they co-hosted UEFA Euro 2012 with Poland, in a group stage exit.

== Personal life ==
His son Oleksiy Husiev is also a professional football player who plays for Chornomorets Odesa, on loan from Dynamo Kyiv.

== Career statistics ==
=== Club ===
Appearances and goals by club, season and competition
Club	Season	League			National cup		Europe		Other		Total	
Club	Season	Division	Apps	Goals	Apps	Goals	Apps	Goals	Apps	Goals	Apps	Goals
Frunzenets-Liha-99 Sumy	2000	AAFU	11	0	–		–		–		11	0
Frunzenets-Liha-99 Sumy	2000–01	Druha Liha	22	6	3	0	–		–		25	6
Frunzenets-Liha-99 Sumy	2001–02	Druha Liha	31	11	–		–		–		31	11
Frunzenets-Liha-99 Sumy	Total		64	17	3	0	–		–		67	17
Borysfen Boryspil	2002–03	Persha Liha	1	0	–		–		–		1	0
Arsenal Kyiv	2002–03	Vyshcha Liha	23	1	5	1	–		–		28	2
Dynamo Kyiv	2003–04	Vyshcha Liha	27	7	7	2	7 (Note: Appearance(s) in UEFA Champions League)	1	–		41	10
Dynamo Kyiv	2004–05	Vyshcha Liha	24	3	3	0	10 (Note: Eight appearances in UEFA Champions League, two appearances in UEFA Europa League)	0	1 (Note: Appearance in Ukrainian Super Cup)	1	38	4
Dynamo Kyiv	2005–06	Vyshcha Liha	24	4	4	2	2	1	1	0	31	7
Dynamo Kyiv	2006–07	Vyshcha Liha	26	4	5	2	10	0	–		41	6
Dynamo Kyiv	2007–08	Vyshcha Liha	20	2	3	2	8	0	–		31	4
Dynamo Kyiv	2008–09	Ukrainian Premier League	9	0	1	0	3 (Note: Appearance(s) in UEFA Europa League)	0	–		13	0
Dynamo Kyiv	2009–10	Ukrainian Premier League	16	5	2	0	4	1	1	0	21	6
Dynamo Kyiv	2010–11	Ukrainian Premier League	23	9	2	0	14 (Note: Three appearances in UEFA Champions League, eleven appearances in UEFA Europa League)	6	–		39	15
Dynamo Kyiv	2011–12	Ukrainian Premier League	22	3	2	0	6 (Note: Two appearances in UEFA Champions League, four appearances in UEFA Europa League)	3	1	1	31	7
Dynamo Kyiv	2012–13	Ukrainian Premier League	28	4	1	0	10 (Note: Eight appearances in UEFA Champions League, two appearances in UEFA Europa League)	2	–		39	6
Dynamo Kyiv	2013–14	Ukrainian Premier League	26	3	4	2	10	3	–		40	8
Dynamo Kyiv	2014–15	Ukrainian Premier League	17	3	7	2	9	4	1	0	34	9
Dynamo Kyiv	2015–16	Ukrainian Premier League	24	10	2	2	3	1	1	0	30	13
Dynamo Kyiv	2016–17	Ukrainian Premier League	6	1	–		1	0	–		7	1
Dynamo Kyiv	2017–18	Ukrainian Premier League	4	0	–		1	0	–		5	0
Dynamo Kyiv	Total		296	58	48	15	98	22	6	2	448	97
Career total			384	76	56	16	98	22	6	2	544	116

=== International ===
Scores and results list Ukraine's goal tally first, score column indicates score after each Husiev goal.

List of international goals scored by Oleh Husiev
No.	Date	Venue	Opponent	Score	Result	Competition
1	17 November 2004	Şükrü Saracoğlu, Istanbul, Turkey	Turkey	1–0	3–0	2006 FIFA World Cup qualification
2	15 August 2006	Valeriy Lobanovskyi Dynamo Stadium, Kyiv, Ukraine	Azerbaijan	4–0	6–0	Friendly
3	24 March 2007	Svangaskarð, Toftir, Faroe Islands	Faroe Islands	2–0	2–0	UEFA Euro 2008 qualification
4	28 March 2007	Chornomorets Stadium, Odessa, Ukraine	Lithuania	1–0	1–0	UEFA Euro 2008 qualification
5	17 October 2007	Olimpiyskiy National Sports Complex, Kyiv, Ukraine	Faroe Islands	2–0	5–0	UEFA Euro 2008 qualification
6	17 October 2007	Olimpiyskiy National Sports Complex, Kyiv, Ukraine	Faroe Islands	3–0	5–0	UEFA Euro 2008 qualification
7	14 October 2009	Estadi Comunal d'Andorra la Vella, Andorra la Vella, Andorra	Andorra	2–0	6–0	2010 FIFA World Cup qualification
8	11 October 2011	A. Le Coq Arena, Tallinn, Estonia	Estonia	1–0	2–0	Friendly
9	29 February 2012	HaMoshava Stadium, Petah Tikva, Israel	Israel	1–0	3–2	Friendly
10	28 May 2012	Kufstein Arena, Kufstein, Austria	Estonia	2–0	4–0	Friendly
11	9 February 2011	Tivoli-Neu, Innsbruck, Austria	Austria	1–1	2–3	Friendly
12	9 February 2011	Tivoli-Neu, Innsbruck, Austria	Austria	2–2	2–3	Friendly
13	22 March 2013	National Stadium, Warsaw, Poland	Poland	2–0	3–1	2014 FIFA World Cup qualification

== Honours ==
Dynamo Kyiv

- Ukrainian Premier League: 2003–04, 2006–07, 2008–09, 2014–15, 2015–16
- Ukrainian Cup: 2004–05, 2005–06, 2006–07, 2013–14, 2014–15
- Ukrainian Super Cup: 2004, 2006, 2007, 2009, 2011

Individual

- Ukrainian Premier League Footballer of the Year: 2005

== See also ==
- 2001 FIFA World Youth Championship squads#Ukraine
