= Danilo Silva =

Brazilian footballer (born 1986)

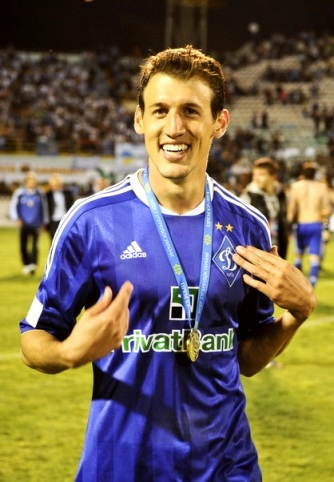

Personal information
- Full name: Danilo Aparecido da Silva
- Date of birth: November 24, 1986 (age 39)
- Place of birth: Campinas, Brazil
- Height: 1.86 m (6 ft 1 in)
- Position: Defender

Youth career
- 2004: Ginásio Pinhalense-SP

Senior career*
Years	Team	Apps	(Gls)
2005	MetroStars	5	(0)
2006–2008	Guarani	47	(3)
2007	→ São Paulo (loan)	3	(0)
2008–2010	Internacional	25	(2)
2010–2017	Dynamo Kyiv	154	(3)
2017–2019	Internacional	19	(0)
2018	→ Los Angeles FC (loan)	10	(0)
2019–2020	Los Angeles FC	6	(0)
- * Club domestic league appearances and goals as of 16 September 2020

Danilo Aparecido da Silva (born 24 November 1986), or simply known as Danilo Silva, is a retired Brazilian professional footballer who played as a centre-back. Silva announced his retirement from football on 23 September 2020.

== Club career ==
Dynamo Kyiv bought Danilo for R$9,867,760 from Internacional (50%) and third parties owner (50%).

== International career ==
In an interview with the coach of the Ukraine national team Mykhaylo Fomenko spoke of him as a possible naturalized. Danilo Silva indicated that he would be likely to accept a call-up for Ukraine national team if asked.

== Honours ==
São Paulo

- Campeonato Brasileiro Série A: 2007

Internacional

- Campeonato Gaúcho: 2009
- Suruga Bank Championship: 2009

Dynamo Kyiv

- Ukrainian Premier League: 2014–15, 2015–16
- Ukrainian Cup: 2013–14, 2014–15
- Ukrainian Super Cup: 2011, 2016

Los Angeles FC

- Supporters' Shield: 2019
