= 2011–12 FC Shakhtar Donetsk season =

Shakhtar
2011–12 season
- Chairman: Rinat Akhmetov
- Manager: Mircea Lucescu
- Ground: Donbas Arena
- Premier League: 1st
- Ukrainian Cup: Winners
- Super Cup: Runners-up
- Champions League: Group stage
- Top goalscorer: League: Yevhen Seleznyov (14); All: Luiz Adriano (16)
Home colours	Away colours

The 2011–12 FC Shakhtar Donetsk season saw the club complete a domestic double, winning their seventh Ukrainian Premier League and eight Ukrainian Cup whilst losing the Ukrainian Super Cup to FC Dynamo Kyiv. Shakhtar also competed in the UEFA Champions League, where they finished fourth in their group, and were eliminated from the competition.

== Season events ==
On 21 May, Shkhtar announced the signing of Dentinho from Corinthians on a contract until the summer of 2016 for a fee of €7.5m.

On 27 July, Fernandinho extended his contract with Shakhtar until the July 2016.

== Squad ==
As of match played 10 May 2012

Number	Name	Nationality	Position	Date of birth (age)	Signed from	Signed in	Contract ends	Apps.	Goals
Goalkeepers
16	Artem Tetenko	(Ukraine)	GK	12 February 1991 (aged 21)	Academy	2007		0	0
23	Bohdan Shust	(Ukraine)	GK	4 March 1986 (aged 26)	Karpaty Lviv	2005			
30	Andriy Pyatov	(Ukraine)	GK	28 June 1984 (aged 27)	Vorskla Poltava	2007		180	0
35	Yuriy Virt	(Ukraine)	GK	4 May 1974 (aged 38)	Metalurh Donetsk	2007			
45	Maksym Ivanov	(Ukraine)	GK	30 April 1991 (aged 21)	Academy	2008		0	0
58	Yevhen Halchuk	(Ukraine)	GK	28 December 1994 (aged 17)	Academy	2011		0	0
62	Mykyta Kryukov	(Ukraine)	GK	30 April 1991 (aged 21)	Academy	2008		0	0
Defenders
3	Tomáš Hübschman	(Czech Republic)	DF	4 September 1981 (aged 30)	Sparta Prague	2004		247	1
5	Oleksandr Kucher	(Ukraine)	DF	22 October 1982 (aged 29)	Metalist Kharkiv	2006		161	4
13	Vyacheslav Shevchuk	(Ukraine)	DF	13 May 1979 (aged 32)	Dnipro Dnipropetrovsk	2005		155	3
14	Vasyl Kobin	(Ukraine)	DF	24 May 1985 (aged 26)	Karpaty Lviv	2009		57	3
26	Răzvan Raț	(Romania)	DF	26 May 1981 (aged 30)	Rapid București	2003		288	12
27	Dmytro Chyhrynskyi (vice-captain)	(Ukraine)	DF	7 November 1986 (aged 25)	Barcelona	2010		167	13
33	Darijo Srna (Captain)	(Croatia)	DF	1 May 1982 (aged 30)	Hajduk Split	2003		337	27
36	Oleksandr Chyzhov	(Ukraine)	DF	10 August 1986 (aged 25)	Vorskla Poltava	2008		36	0
38	Serhiy Kryvtsov	(Ukraine)	DF	15 March 1991 (aged 21)	Metalurh Zaporizhzhia	2010	2015	9	0
43	Ivan Ordets	(Ukraine)	DF	8 July 1992 (aged 19)	Academy	2009		0	0
44	Yaroslav Rakitskyi	(Ukraine)	DF	3 August 1989 (aged 22)	Academy	2009		108	6
47	Maksym Zhychykov	(Ukraine)	DF	7 November 1992 (aged 19)	Academy	2009		0	0
57	Mykhaylo Pysko	(Ukraine)	DF	19 March 1993 (aged 19)	UFK Lviv	2010		0	0
60	Ihor Duts	(Ukraine)	DF	11 April 1994 (aged 18)	Academy	2011		0	0
	Yevhen Yefremov	(Ukraine)	DF	17 January 1994 (aged 18)	Academy	2011		0	0
Midfielders
7	Fernandinho	(Brazil)	MF	4 May 1985 (aged 27)	Paranaense	2005	2016	248	47
8	Ilsinho	(Brazil)	MF	12 October 1985 (aged 26)	São Paulo	2012	2015	103	15
10	Willian	(Brazil)	MF	9 August 1988 (aged 23)	Corinthians	2007	2012	199	29
15	Taras Stepanenko	(Ukraine)	MF	8 August 1989 (aged 22)	Metalurh Zaporizhzhia	2010	2015	32	1
19	Oleksiy Hai	(Ukraine)	MF	6 November 1982 (aged 29)	Illichivets Mariupol	2000		204	19
20	Douglas Costa	(Brazil)	MF	14 September 1990 (aged 21)	Grêmio	2010	2015	95	19
22	Henrikh Mkhitaryan	(Armenia)	MF	21 January 1989 (aged 23)	Metalurh Donetsk	2010	2015	64	15
29	Alex Teixeira	(Brazil)	MF	6 January 1990 (aged 22)	Vasco da Gama	2010	2015	79	14
46	Oleksiy Chereda	(Ukraine)	MF	18 April 1994 (aged 18)	Academy	2011		0	0
52	Oleksandr Noyok	(Ukraine)	MF	15 May 1992 (aged 19)	Academy	2009		0	0
56	Vitaliy Koltsov	(Ukraine)	MF	20 March 1994 (aged 18)	Academy	2011		0	0
61	Volodymyr Sadokha	(Ukraine)	MF	19 February 1994 (aged 18)	Academy	2011		0	0
64	Ruslan Kisil	(Ukraine)	MF	23 October 1991 (aged 20)	Academy	2008		0	0
65	Maksym Malyshev	(Ukraine)	MF	24 December 1992 (aged 19)	Academy	2005		0	0
67	Vyacheslav Churko	(Ukraine)	MF	10 May 1993 (aged 19)	Academy	2009		0	0
70	Alan Patrick	(Brazil)	MF	13 May 1991 (aged 20)	Santos	2011	2016	2	1
77	Vladlen Yurchenko	(Ukraine)	MF	22 January 1994 (aged 18)	Academy	2010		0	0
Forwards
9	Luiz Adriano	(Brazil)	FW	12 April 1987 (aged 25)	Internacional	2007		163	67
10	Yevhen Seleznyov	(Ukraine)	FW	20 July 1985 (aged 26)	Academy	2011		58	26
11	Eduardo	(Croatia)	FW	25 February 1983 (aged 29)	Arsenal	2010	2014	55	19
31	Dentinho	(Brazil)	FW	19 January 1989 (aged 23)	Corinthians	2011	2016	20	3
41	Serhiy Hryn	(Ukraine)	FW	6 June 1994 (aged 17)	Academy	2011		0	0
42	Valeriy Hryshyn	(Ukraine)	FW	12 June 1994 (aged 17)	Academy	2011		0	0
48	Artur Zahorulko	(Ukraine)	FW	13 February 1993 (aged 19)	Academy	2011		0	0
50	Vladyslav Kulach	(Ukraine)	FW	7 May 1993 (aged 19)	Academy	2010		0	0
54	Leonid Akulinin	(Ukraine)	FW	7 March 1993 (aged 19)	Academy	2009		0	0
63	Vladyslav Nekhtiy	(Ukraine)	FW	19 December 1991 (aged 20)	Academy	2008		0	0
72	Julius Aghahowa	(Nigeria)	FW	12 February 1982 (aged 30)	Kayserispor	2009		169	53
74	Maksym Ilyuk	(Ukraine)	FW	10 November 1990 (aged 21)	Bukovyna Chernivtsi	2008		0	0
Also under contract
	Stanislav Mykytsey	(Ukraine)	DF	7 September 1989 (aged 22)	Academy	2005		1	0
Out on loan
92	Roman Yemelyanov	(Russia)	MF	8 May 1992 (aged 20)	Tolyatti	2010	2013	1	0
	Rustam Khudzhamov	(Ukraine)	GK	5 October 1982 (aged 29)	Kharkiv	2008		19	0
	Mykyta Shevchenko	(Ukraine)	GK	26 January 1993 (aged 19)	Academy	2011		0	0
	Bohdan Butko	(Ukraine)	DF	13 January 1991 (aged 21)	Academy	2008		0	0
	Artem Fedetskyi	(Ukraine)	DF	26 April 1985 (aged 27)	Kharkiv	2008		9	1
	Ivan Lukaniuk	(Ukraine)	DF	5 February 1993 (aged 19)	Academy	2010		59	0
	Mykola Ishchenko	(Ukraine)	DF	9 March 1983 (aged 29)	Karpaty Lviv	2008		59	0
	Yaroslav Oliynyk	(Ukraine)	DF	14 March 1991 (aged 21)	Academy	2008		0	0
	Bruno Renan	(Brazil)	MF	19 April 1991 (aged 21)	Villarreal	2010	2015	2	0
	Tornike Okriashvili	(Georgia (country))	MF	12 February 1992 (aged 20)	Gagra	2011		0	0
	David Targamadze	(Georgia (country))	MF	22 August 1989 (aged 22)	Oleksandriya	2011	2016	0	0
	Ihor Chaykovskyi	(Ukraine)	MF	7 October 1991 (aged 20)	Academy	2008		0	0
	Vitaliy Fedotov	(Ukraine)	MF	16 July 1991 (aged 20)	Academy	2008		0	0
	Dmytro Hrechyshkin	(Ukraine)	MF	22 September 1991 (aged 20)	Academy	2008		0	0
	Maksym Kovalyov	(Ukraine)	MF	20 March 1989 (aged 23)	Academy	2005			
	Denys Kozhanov	(Ukraine)	MF	13 June 1987 (aged 24)	Academy	2005			
	Oleksiy Polyanskyi	(Ukraine)	MF	12 April 1986 (aged 26)	Metalurh Donetsk	2006			
	Kostyantyn Yaroshenko	(Ukraine)	MF	12 April 1986 (aged 26)	Metalurh Donetsk	2002			
	Pylyp Budkivskyi	(Ukraine)	FW	10 March 1992 (aged 20)	Academy	2009		0	0
	Ruslan Fomin	(Ukraine)	FW	2 March 1986 (aged 26)	Arsenal Kharkiv	2005		30	5
	Oleksandr Karavayev	(Ukraine)	FW	2 June 1992 (aged 19)	Academy	2005		0	0
	Vitaliy Vitsenets	(Ukraine)	FW	3 August 1990 (aged 21)	Academy	2010	2015	24	2
Players who left during the season
8	Jádson	(Brazil)	MF	5 October 1983 (aged 28)	Paranaense	2005		274	64
25	Oleksandr Rybka	(Ukraine)	GK	10 April 1987 (aged 25)	Obolon Kyiv	2011		26	0
99	Marcelo Moreno	(Bolivia)	FW	18 June 1987 (aged 24)	Cruzeiro	2008		46	11

=== Out on loan ===
Note: Flags indicate national team as defined under FIFA eligibility rules; some limited exceptions apply. Players may hold more than one non-FIFA nationality.

No.	Pos.	Nation	Player
—	GK	UKR	Rustam Khudzhamov (at Illichivets Mariupol)
—	GK	UKR	Mykyta Shevchenko (at Illichivets Mariupol)
—	DF	UKR	Bohdan Butko (at Illichivets Mariupol)
—	DF	UKR	Artem Fedetskyi (at Karpaty Lviv)
—	DF	UKR	Mykola Ishchenko (at Illichivets Mariupol)
—	DF	UKR	Ivan Lukanyuk (at Prykarpattya)
—	DF	UKR	Yaroslav Oliynyk (at Zorya Luhansk)
—	MF	BRA	Bruno (at Zorya Luhansk)
—	MF	GEO	Tornike Okriashvili (at Illichivets Mariupol)
—	MF	GEO	David Targamadze (at Illichivets Mariupol)
—	MF	RUS	Roman Yemelyanov (at Rostov)

No.	Pos.	Nation	Player
—	MF	UKR	Ihor Chaykovskyi (at Illichivets Mariupol)
—	MF	UKR	Vitaliy Fedotov (at Illichivets Mariupol)
—	MF	UKR	Dmytro Hrechyshkin (at Illichivets Mariupol)
—	MF	UKR	Maksym Kovalyov (at Illichivets Mariupol)
—	MF	UKR	Denys Kozhanov (at Illichivets Mariupol)
—	MF	UKR	Oleksiy Polyanskyi (at Illichivets Mariupol)
—	MF	UKR	Kostyantyn Yaroshenko (at Illichivets Mariupol)
—	FW	UKR	Pylyp Budkivskyi (at Illichivets Mariupol)
—	FW	UKR	Ruslan Fomin (at Illichivets Mariupol)
—	FW	UKR	Oleksandr Karavayev (at Sevastopol)
—	FW	UKR	Vitaliy Vitsenets (at Illichivets Mariupol)

== Transfers ==
=== In ===
Date	Position	Nationality	Name	From	Fee	Ref.
21 May 2011	FW	(Brazil)	Dentinho	Corinthians	€7,500,000	
24 June 2011	MF	(Brazil)	Alan Patrick	Santos	€4,000,000	
1 July 2011	GK	(Ukraine)	Oleksandr Rybka	Obolon Kyiv	Undisclosed	
1 July 2011	FW	(Ukraine)	Yevhen Seleznyov	Dnipro Dnipropetrovsk	Undisclosed	
30 December 2011	MF	(Georgia (country))	David Targamadze	Oleksandriya	Undisclosed	
26 January 2012	MF	(Brazil)	Ilsinho	Internacional	Undisclosed	

=== Out ===
Date	Position	Nationality	Name	To	Fee	Ref.
1 July 2011	DF	(Ukraine)	Ihor Korotetskyi	Zorya Luhansk	Undisclosed	
1 July 2011	FW	(Mexico)	Nery Castillo	Aris	Undisclosed	
1 July 2011	FW	(Ukraine)	Yehor Kartushov	Zorya Luhansk	Undisclosed	
14 December 2011	FW	(Bolivia)	Marcelo Moreno	Grêmio	Undisclosed	
1 January 2012	DF	(Brazil)	Leonardo	Atlético Goianiense	Undisclosed	
1 January 2012	MF	(Ukraine)	Serhiy Shevchuk	Illichivets Mariupol	Undisclosed	
1 January 2012	MF	(Ukraine)	Serhiy Yavorskyi	Illichivets Mariupol	Undisclosed	
1 January 2012	FW	(Ukraine)	Oleksandr Kasyan	Karpaty Lviv	Undisclosed	
15 January 2012	MF	(Brazil)	Jádson	São Paulo	Undisclosed	

=== Loans out ===
Date From	Position	Nationality	Name	To	Date To	Ref.
1 January 2011	GK	(Ukraine)	Bohdan Shust	Illichivets Mariupol	31 December 2011	
1 January 2011	MF	(Ukraine)	Ihor Chaykovskyi	Illichivets Mariupol	End of season	
4 January 2011	DF	(Ukraine)	Stanislav Mykytsey	Illichivets Mariupol	2 October 2011	
1 May 2011	DF	(Brazil)	Leonardo	Atlético Goianiense	31 December 2011	
1 July 2011	GK	(Ukraine)	Rustam Khudzhamov	Metalurh Donetsk	1 December 2011	
1 July 2011	DF	(Ukraine)	Bohdan Butko	Illichivets Mariupol	31 December 2014	
1 July 2011	MF	(Brazil)	Bruno	Zorya Luhansk	1 December 2011	
1 July 2011	MF	(Ukraine)	Kostyantyn Kravchenko	Karpaty Lviv	31 December 2011	
1 July 2011	MF	(Ukraine)	Maksym Kovalyov	Illichivets Mariupol	End of season	
1 July 2011	MF	(Ukraine)	Oleksiy Polyanskyi	Illichivets Mariupol	31 December 2011	
1 July 2011	MF	(Ukraine)	Serhiy Shevchuk	Illichivets Mariupol	31 December 2011	
1 July 2011	FW	(Ukraine)	Ruslan Fomin	Illichivets Mariupol	End of season	
1 July 2011	FW	(Ukraine)	Oleksandr Kasyan	Illichivets Mariupol	31 December 2011	
1 August 2011	MF	(Russia)	Roman Yemelyanov	Rostov	End of season	
1 August 2011	MF	(Ukraine)	Vitaliy Vitsenets	Illichivets Mariupol	End of season	
23 August 2011	DF	(Ukraine)	Mykola Ishchenko	Illichivets Mariupol	End of season	
1 January 2012	GK	(Ukraine)	Rustam Khudzhamov	Illichivets Mariupol	End of season	
1 January 2012	MF	(Georgia (country))	David Targamadze	Illichivets Mariupol	End of season	

=== Released ===
Date	Position	Nationality	Name	Joined	Date	Ref.
30 January 2012	GK	(Ukraine)	Oleksandr Rybka	Banned		
30 June 2012	GK	(Ukraine)	Yuriy Virt	Retired		
30 June 2012	FW	(Nigeria)	Julius Aghahowa	Retired		

== Competitions ==
=== Overall ===
Competition	First match	Last match	Starting round	Final position	Record							
Competition	First match	Last match	Starting round	Final position	Pld	W	D	L	GF	GA	GD	Win %
Premier League	10 July 2011	10 May 2012	Matchday 1	Champions	30	25	4	1	80	18	+62	83.33
Ukrainian Cup	21 September 2011	6 May 2012	Round of 32	Champions	5	5	0	0	12	6	+6	100.00
Super Cup	5 July 2011		Final	Runners Up	1	0	0	1	1	3	−2	0.00
UEFA Champions League	13 September 2011	6 December 2011	Group Stage	Group Stage	6	1	2	3	6	8	−2	16.67
Total					42	31	6	5	99	35	+64	73.81

Last updated: 10 May 2011
Source: Results

=== Super Cup ===
5 July 2011	Shakhtar Donetsk	1–3	Dynamo Kyiv	Poltava
21:00 EEST (UTC+3)	Fernandinho 14', (yellow card) 40'; Srna (yellow card) 40'; Teixeira (yellow card) 85'	Summary	Husyev 5' (pen.), (yellow card) 45+1'; Eremenko (yellow card) 15'; Diakhaté 31'; Yussuf (yellow card) 40'; Popov (yellow card) 40'; Vukojević (yellow card) 61'; Milevskyi (yellow card) 75', (goal) 83'; Yarmolenko (yellow card) 84'	Stadium: Oleksiy Butovskyi Vorskla Stadium; Attendance: 24,750; Referee: Yuriy Vaks

=== Premier League ===
==== Table ====
Pos	Team	Pld	W	D	L	GF	GA	GD	Pts	Qualification or relegation
1	Shakhtar Donetsk (C)	30	25	4	1	80	18	+62	79 (Note: Between Round 26 and Round 28 Dynamo Kyiv and Shakhtar Donetsk had accumulated the same number of points. With the possibility that both teams could finish the competition on the same number of points, the administration of the Premier League decided on 2 May 2012 before Round 29, that if a Golden Match was to be played to decide the championship winner, the encounter would have taken place on 13 May 2012 in Zaporizhzhia at Slavutych Arena.)	Qualification to Champions League group stage
2	Dynamo Kyiv	30	23	6	1	56	12	+44	75	Qualification to Champions League third qualifying round
3	Metalist Kharkiv	30	16	11	3	54	32	+22	59 (Note: On 12 August 2010, the Football Federation of Ukraine punished Metalist Kharkiv and Karpaty Lviv for fixing a match in 2008; both teams were handed a fine and deducted nine points each. The FFU then released a statement on 19 October 2010 that the point deductions will be applied for the 2011–12 season. However, Karpaty Lviv have indicated that they will take the matter to the Court of Arbitration for Sport (CAS) at Lausanne. No action had been taken through the season nor of any decision by the league. On 2 August 2013 CAS acknowledged the fact of game fixing between Karpaty and Metalist in 2008. The court did not approve points deduction for both of the clubs, yet suggested to have Metalist stripped of its bronze awards for the 2007–08 Ukrainian Premier League and number of players and staff from both clubs were posed penalties and fines for involvement in the game fixing. On 6 August 2013 UEFA suspended advancement of Metalist Kharkiv in the 2013–14 UEFA Champions League to the playoff round until its final decision on 13 August 2013.)	Qualification to Europa League play-off round (Note: Metalurh Donetsk qualified for the Europa League as losing finalist of the 2011–12 Ukrainian Cup to Champions League-qualified Shakhtar Donetsk. Moreover, Dnipro Dnipropetrovsk and Arsenal Kyiv were moved up a round as the cup winner spot was not used.)
4	Dnipro Dnipropetrovsk	30	15	7	8	52	35	+17	52	Qualification to Europa League play-off round
5	Arsenal Kyiv	30	14	9	7	44	27	+17	51	Qualification to Europa League third qualifying round

Source: uafootball.net.ua
Rules for classification: 1st points; 2nd goal difference; 3rd goals scored; 4th fair play
(C) Champions

==== Results summary ====
Overall								Home						Away					
Pld	W	D	L	GF	GA	GD	Pts	W	D	L	GF	GA	GD	W	D	L	GF	GA	GD
30	25	4	1	80	18	+62	79	13	1	1	42	7	+35	12	3	0	38	11	+27

Last updated: 10 May 2011.
Source: Results

==== Results by round ====
Round	1	2	3	4	5	6	7	8	9	10	11	12	13	14	15	16	17	18	19	20	21	22	23	24	25	26	27	28	29	30
Ground	H	A	H	A	H	A	H	A	H	H	A	H	A	H	A	A	H	A	H	A	H	A	H	A	A	H	A	H	A	H
Result	W	W	W	D	W	W	W	D	W	W	D	W	W	L	W	W	W	W	W	W	D	W	W	W	W	W	W	W	W	W
Position	1	1	1	1	1	1	1	2	1	1	1	1	1	3	2	2	2	2	2	2	2	2	2	2	2	1	1	1	1	1

Updated to match(es) played on 10 May 2011. Source: Results
A = Away; H = Home; W = Win; D = Draw; L = Loss

==== Results ====
10 July 2011 1	Shakhtar Donetsk	4–0	Obolon Kyiv	Donetsk
19:00 EEST (UTC+3)	Seleznyov 11'; Fernandinho (yellow card) 30'; Dentinho 63'; Mkhitaryan 83'; Luiz Adriano 90+1'	Summary	Sibiryakov (yellow card) 35'; Kotenko (yellow card) 65'; Baranets (yellow card) 86'	Stadium: Donbas Arena; Attendance: 34,036; Referee: Yaroslav Kozyk

16 July 2011 2	Metalurh Donetsk	0–2	Shakhtar Donetsk	Donetsk
19:00 EEST (UTC+3)	Pizzelli (yellow card) 43'; Volovyk (yellow card) 45+1'; Fernandes (yellow card) 60'	Summary	Srna 45+1'; Douglas Costa (yellow card) 53'; Willian 64'	Stadium: Metalurh Stadium; Attendance: 4,700; Referee: Anatolii Abdula

24 July 2011 3	Shakhtar Donetsk	2–1	Karpaty Lviv	Donetsk
19:00 EEST (UTC+3)	Srna (yellow card) 43'; Willian 50'; Kucher (yellow card) 55'; Teixeira 73'	Summary	Avelar 38'; Tkachuk (yellow card) 61'; Martynyuk (yellow card) 84'; Milošević (yellow card) 88'	Stadium: Donbas Arena; Attendance: 40,341; Referee: Serhii Boiko

31 July 2011 4	Arsenal Kyiv	1–1	Shakhtar Donetsk	Kyiv
19:30 EEST (UTC+3)	Hrytsay (yellow card) 8'; Florescu (yellow card) 29'; Polyovyi (yellow card) 29'; Mazilu 90+5'	Summary	Fernandinho 11'; Gai (yellow card) 58'	Stadium: Valeriy Lobanovskyi Dynamo Stadium; Attendance: 8,900; Referee: Yurii Hryso

7 August 2011 5	Shakhtar Donetsk	2–0	Kryvbas	Donetsk
19:00 EEST (UTC+3)	Seleznyov 43'; Shevchuk 48'	Summary	Kostyshyn (yellow card) 34'; Matić (yellow card) 72'	Stadium: Donbas Arena; Attendance: 38,134; Referee: Ihor Ishchenko

13 August 2011 6	Dnipro Dnipropetrovsk	1–3	Shakhtar Donetsk	Dnipropetrovsk
20:00 EEST (UTC+3)	Rotan (yellow card) 68'; Kalinić (yellow card) 69' (red card) 83', (goal) 81'; Kravchenko (yellow card) 78'; Inkoom (yellow card) 84'	Summary	Luiz Adriano 6', (yellow card) 30'; Douglas Costa (yellow card) 45'; Jádson 45+1'; Srna (yellow card) 53'; Fernandinho 59'; Seleznyov (yellow card) 76'	Stadium: Dnipro Arena; Attendance: 31,003; Referee: Anatolii Abdula

21 August 2011 7	Shakhtar Donetsk	3–0	Illichivets Mariupol	Donetsk
19:00 EEST (UTC+3)	Eduardo 7'; Teixeira 30'; Seleznyov 51'	Summary	Nevmyvaka (yellow card) 12' (yellow-red card) 77'; Pukanych (yellow card) 13'; Savin (yellow card) 43'	Stadium: Donbas Arena; Attendance: 38,125; Referee: Vitalii Romanov

28 August 2011 8	Chornomorets Odesa	2–2	Shakhtar Donetsk	Odesa
18:00 EEST (UTC+3)	Burdujan 5', 90'; Setti (yellow card) 67'; Politylo (yellow card) 76'	Summary	Jádson 25'; Rakytskiy (yellow card) 33'; Kucher (yellow card) 75'; Mkhitaryan 83'	Stadium: Spartak Stadium; Attendance: 4,610; Referee: Serhii Dankovskyi

9 September 2011 9	Shakhtar Donetsk	5–1	Volyn	Donetsk
19:00 EEST (UTC+3)	Luiz Adriano 18', 37'; Eduardo 27'; Jádson 34'; Rakytskiy (yellow card) 78'; Douglas Costa 85'	Summary	Maksymyuk (yellow card) 43'; Sharpar (yellow card) 49'; Maicon 52'; Schumacher (yellow card) 55'	Stadium: Donbas Arena; Attendance: 34,156; Referee: Serhii Lisenchuk

18 September 2011 10	Shakhtar Donetsk	1–0	Vorskla Poltava	Donetsk
18:00 EEST (UTC+3)	Fernandinho (yellow card) 32'; Dentinho 52'	Summary	Matviyiv (yellow card) 62'	Stadium: Donbas Arena; Attendance: 37,904; Referee: Oleksandr Derdo

24 September 2011 11	Dynamo Kyiv	0–0	Shakhtar Donetsk	Kyiv
20:00 EEST (UTC+3)	Vukojević (yellow card) 30'; Khacheridi (yellow card) 33'; Popov (yellow card) 72'; Mykhalyk (yellow card) 90+1'	Summary	Luiz Adriano (yellow card) 16'; Mkhitaryan (yellow card) 56'; Teixeira (yellow card) 72'; Hübschman (yellow card) 74'; Srna (yellow card) 77'; Seleznyov (yellow card) 90'	Stadium: Lobanovsky Dynamo Stadium; Attendance: 17,000; Referee: Viktor Shvetsov

2 October 2011 12	Shakhtar Donetsk	4–1	Zorya Luhansk	Donetsk
16:00 EEST (UTC+3)	Douglas Costa 44'; Seleznyov 50', 62', (yellow card) 78'; Eduardo 70'	Summary	Milko 22', (yellow card) 30'; Petryak (yellow card) 59'; Silyuk (yellow card) 80'	Stadium: Donbas Arena; Attendance: 30,804; Referee: Anatolii Zhabchenko

15 October 2011 13	Tavriya Simferopol	1–3	Shakhtar Donetsk	Simferopol
17:00 EEST (UTC+3)	Kalynychenko (yellow card) 18'; Nazarenko 36' (yellow card) 70'; Monakhov (yellow card) 90+4'	Summary	Luiz Adriano 28', 90+5'; Srna (yellow card) 34'; Shevchuk 90+2'	Stadium: Lokomotiv Stadium; Attendance: 15,100; Referee: Serhii Dankovskyi

23 October 2011 14	Shakhtar Donetsk	1–2	Metalist Kharkiv	Donetsk
16:00 EEST (UTC+3)	Shevchuk (yellow card) 25'; Douglas Costa (yellow card) 57'; Mkhitaryan 60'; Srna (yellow card) 62'	Summary	Dević (yellow card) 25'; Taison (yellow card) 32'; Villagra 45+2'; Torsiglieri 54'; Gueye (yellow card) 69' (yellow-red card) 82'; Edmar (yellow card) 71'; Dišljenković (yellow card) 90+3'	Stadium: Donbas Arena; Attendance: 45,204; Referee: Serhii Boiko

29 October 2011 15	Oleksandriya	2–3	Shakhtar Donetsk	Oleksandriia
17:00 EET (UTC+2)	Králík (yellow card) 11'; Starenkyi 24', (yellow card) 67'; Cherednychenko (yellow card) 34'; Sydorenko 37'; Davydov (yellow card) 78'; Zeynalov (yellow card) 84' (yellow-red card) 89'	Summary	Dentinho 5', (yellow card) 38'; Willian 13'; Teixeira 34'; Rakytskiy (yellow card) 50' (yellow-red card) 72'	Stadium: CSC Nika Stadium; Attendance: 7,000; Referee: Yevhen Aranovskiy

6 November 2011 16	Obolon Kyiv	0–2	Shakhtar Donetsk	Kyiv
17:00 EET (UTC+2)	Romanyuk (yellow card) 12'; Sibiryakov (yellow card) 23'; Shevchuk (yellow card) 64' (yellow-red card) 71'	Summary	Srna (yellow card) 9'; Stepanenko (yellow card) 43'; Douglas Costa 47'; Kryvtsov (yellow card) 51'; Seleznyov 90'	Stadium: Obolon Arena; Attendance: 5,000; Referee: Oleksandr Derdo

19 November 2011 17	Shakhtar Donetsk	2–0	Metalurh Donetsk	Donetsk
16:00 EET (UTC+2)	Luiz Adriano 64' (pen.); Shevchuk (yellow card) 77', (goal) 88'	Summary		Stadium: Donbas Arena; Attendance: 28,023; Referee: Ihor Ishchenko

27 November 2011 18	Karpaty Lviv	0–5	Shakhtar Donetsk	Lviv
16:00 EET (UTC+2)	Tlumak (yellow card) 23'; Holodyuk (yellow card) 57'; Batista (yellow card) 71'	Summary	Douglas Costa 23' (pen.); Seleznyov (yellow card) 27' (goal) 65', 67'; Fernandinho 58' (pen.); Mkhitaryan 75'	Stadium: Ukraina Stadium; Attendance: 15,000; Referee: Yurii Vaks

2 December 2011 19	Shakhtar Donetsk	5–0	Arsenal Kyiv	Donetsk
17:00 EET (UTC+2)	Srna 13'; Douglas Costa 30'; Mkhitaryan (yellow card) 45+2', (goal) 57'; Stepanenko (yellow card) 47'; Fernandinho (yellow card) 49'; Bohdanov 69' (o.g.); Shevchuk (yellow card) 73'; Eduardo 76'	Summary	Shershun (red card) 29'; Shatskikh (yellow card) 34'; Hrytsay (yellow card) 34'; Florescu (yellow card) 65'; Polevoy (yellow card) 89'	Stadium: Donbas Arena; Attendance: 21,945; Referee: Anatolii Zhabchenko

11 December 2011 20	Kryvbas	0–4	Shakhtar Donetsk	Kryvyi Rih
17:30 EET (UTC+2)	Valeyev (yellow card) 37'; Lysytskyi (yellow card) 44'; Bartulović (yellow card) 58'	Summary	Douglas Costa 10'; Mkhitaryan 60'; Kucher (yellow card) 75'; Eduardo 84'; Luiz Adriano 90+2'	Stadium: Metalurg Stadium; Attendance: 25,000; Referee: Viktor Shvetsov

4 March 2012 21	Shakhtar Donetsk	1–1	Dnipro Dnipropetrovsk	Donetsk
16:00 EET (UTC+2)	Mkhitaryan 40'; Kucher (yellow card) 88'; Srna (yellow card) 89'; Rakytskiy (yellow card) 90+4'	Summary	Konoplyanka (yellow card) 12'; Matheus 30', (yellow card) 75'; Mandzyuk (yellow card) 67' (yellow-red card) 89'; Oliynyk (yellow card) 69'	Stadium: Donbas Arena; Attendance: 39,873; Referee: Viktor Shvetsov

10 March 2012 22	Illichivets Mariupol	1–2	Shakhtar Donetsk	Mariupol
14:30 EET (UTC+2)	Budkivskyi (yellow card) 56'; Fedotov (yellow card) 63'; Yaroshenko 68'; Polyanskiy (yellow card) 75'; Pukanych (yellow card) 90+2'	Summary	Hübschman 6', (yellow card) 53'; Eduardo (yellow card) 30'; Willian 55'; Kryvtsov (yellow card) 67'; Kobin (yellow card) 75'	Stadium: Illichivets Stadium; Attendance: 9,500; Referee: Dmytro Kutakov

17 March 2012 23	Shakhtar Donetsk	4–0	Chornomorets Odesa	Donetsk
16:00 EET (UTC+2)	Seleznyov 5', 80'; Mkhitaryan (yellow card) 30'; Ilsinho 45+1'; Teixeira 67'; Kucher (yellow card) 70'; Douglas Costa (yellow card) 90+3'	Summary		Stadium: Donbas Arena; Attendance: 30,567; Referee: Yurii Mozharovskyi

23 March 2012 24	Volyn Lutsk	1–2	Shakhtar Donetsk	Lutsk
19:00 EET (UTC+2)	Pylypchuk 39', (yellow card) 81'; Sharpar (yellow card) 62'; Herasymyuk (yellow card) 69' (yellow-red card) 90'; Shelikhov (yellow card) 73'; Pyschur (yellow card) 77'; Siminin (yellow card) 90+3'	Summary	Luiz Adriano 26', 88' (pen.); Kucher (yellow card) 53' (yellow-red card) 60'; Srna (yellow card) 80'; Fernandinho (yellow card) 82'; Rakytskiy (yellow card) 84'	Stadium: Avanhard Stadium; Attendance: 10,000; Referee: Yaroslav Kozyk

1 April 2012 25	Vorskla Poltava	0–2	Shakhtar Donetsk	Poltava
16:00 EEST (UTC+3)	Oberemko (yellow card) 83'	Summary	Seleznyov 27'; Douglas Costa (yellow card) 31'; Teixeira 49'; Dentinho (yellow card) 68'; Chyhrynskyi (yellow card) 73'	Stadium: Butovsky Vorskla Stadium; Attendance: 13,500; Referee: Anatolii Zhabchenko

7 April 2012 26	Shakhtar Donetsk	2–0	Dynamo Kyiv	Donetsk
16:00 EEST (UTC+3)	Teixeira 56', (yellow card) 59'; Rakytskiy 81'; Willian (yellow card) 81'; Kucher (yellow card) 90'; Shevchuk (yellow card) 90+2'	Summary	Harmash (yellow card) 8' (yellow-red card) 42'; Yarmolenko (yellow card) 30'; Aliyev (yellow card) 44'; Popov (yellow card) 55'; Ideye (yellow card) 71'	Stadium: Donbas Arena; Attendance: 52,207; Referee: Yurii Vaks

16 April 2012 27	Zorya Luhansk	1–5	Shakhtar Donetsk	Luhansk
18:30 EEST (UTC+3)	Silyuk 72'	Summary	Mkhitaryan 8', 74'; Teixeira 16'; Luiz Adriano 31' (pen.); Srna 77'	Stadium: Avanhard Stadium; Attendance: 20,000; Referee: Yurii Mozharovskyi

21 April 2012 28	Shakhtar Donetsk	3–1	Tavriya	Donetsk
17:00 EEST (UTC+3)	Seleznyov 17', 69'; Rakytskiy 60'; Srna (yellow card) 90'	Summary	Shynder 47'	Stadium: Donbas Arena; Attendance: 34,107; Referee: Anatoliy Abdula

2 May 2012 29	Metalist	1–2	Shakhtar Donetsk	Kharkiv
19:00 EEST (UTC+3)	Blanco 11'; Obradović (yellow card) 37'; Gueye (yellow card) 40'; Sosa (yellow card) 85'	Summary	Luiz Adriano 36'; Stepanenko (yellow card) 49'; Fernandinho 50', (yellow card) 88'; Pyatov (yellow card) 68'; Shevchuk (yellow card) 90+3'	Stadium: Metalist Stadium; Attendance: 38,633; Referee: Anatolii Zhabchenko

10 May 2012 30	Shakhtar Donetsk	3–0	Oleksandria	Donetsk
19:00 EEST (UTC+3)	Willian 15'; Mkhitaryan 28'; Srna (yellow card) 67'; Seleznyov 56'	Summary	Sydorenko (yellow card) 79'	Stadium: Donbas Arena; Attendance: 49,317; Referee: Oleksandr Derdo

=== Ukrainian Cup ===
21 September 2011 Round of 32	Shakhtar Sverdlovsk	0–2	Shakhtar Donetsk	Sverdlovsk
15:30 EEST (UTC+3)	Korobkin (yellow card) 21'	Report	Alan Patrick 31'; Kobin (yellow card) 32'; Moreno 42'	Stadium: Hariushkin Stadium; Attendance: 7,750; Referee: Serhii Skrypak

26 October 2011 Round of 16	Dynamo Kyiv	2–3	Shakhtar Donetsk	Kyiv
20:15 EEST (UTC+3)	Yarmolenko 41', (yellow card) 76'; Husyev (yellow card) 70'; Aliyev (yellow card) 85'; Popov (yellow card) 89'; Mykhalyk (yellow card) 90+3'; Milevskyi 90+4'	Report	Eduardo 9', 88', (yellow card) 48'; Teixeira 31'; Rybka (yellow card) 72'; Mkhitaryan (yellow card) 90+3'	Stadium: Lobanovsky Dynamo Stadium; Attendance: 16,000; Referee: Anatolii Abdula

11 April 2012 Quarterfinals	Metalurh Zaporizhya	0–1	Shakhtar Donetsk	Zaporizhia
17:00 EEST (UTC+3)	Khalfaoui (yellow card) 30'; Tsurikov (yellow card) 60'; Byelik (yellow card) 70'; Shturko (yellow card) 80'	Report	Kobin (yellow card) 20'; Rakytskiy (yellow card) 59'; Mkhitaryan 79'	Stadium: Slavutych Arena; Attendance: 11,700; Referee: Andrii Kuzmin

27 April 2012 Semifinal	Volyn Lutsk	3–4	Shakhtar Donetsk	Lutsk
19:00 EEST (UTC+3)	Šikov (yellow card) 30'; Maicon 35' (pen.), 90+2' (yellow card) 59'; Siminin (yellow card) 46'; Pavlov (yellow card) 82'; Lopes 84'	Report	Teixeira 24'; Stepanenko (yellow card) 32'; Fernandinho 37' (pen.); Luiz Adriano 60' (pen.); Douglas Costa 90'; Fernandinho (yellow card) 90+1'; Pyatov (yellow card) 90+4'	Stadium: Avanhard Stadium; Attendance: 12,080; Referee: Vitaliy Hodulyan

6 May 2012 Final	Metalurh Donetsk	1–2 (a.e.t.)	Shakhtar Donetsk	Kyiv
19.30 EEST (UTC+3)	Mkrtchyan (yellow card) 23'; Ghazaryan (yellow card) 25'; Morozyuk 69'; Soares (yellow card) 80'	Report	Mkhitaryan (yellow card) 18'; Teixeira 23'; Fernandinho (yellow card) 90+4'; Kucher 104'	Stadium: NSC Olimpiyskiy; Attendance: 47,314; Referee: Anatolii Abdula

=== UEFA Champions League ===
==== Group stage ====
Pos	Team	Pld	W	D	L	GF	GA	GD	Pts	Qualification
1	(Cyprus) APOEL	6	2	3	1	6	6	0	9 (Note: Head-to-head points: APOEL 4, Zenit Saint Petersburg 1.)	Advance to knockout phase
2	(Russia) Zenit Saint Petersburg	6	2	3	1	7	5	+2	9	Advance to knockout phase
3	(Portugal) Porto	6	2	2	2	7	7	0	8	Transfer to Europa League
4	(Ukraine) Shakhtar Donetsk	6	1	2	3	6	8	−2	5	

Source: Soccerway
Notes:

13 September 2011 1	Porto (Portugal)	2–1	(Ukraine) Shakhtar Donetsk	Porto, Portugal
21:45 EEST (UTC+3)	Hulk 28'; Pereira (yellow card) 34'; Kléber 51'	Report	Luiz Adriano 12', (yellow card) 27'; Chyhrynskyi (yellow card) 31' (yellow-red card) 80'; Srna (yellow card) 34'; Rakytskiy (red card) 40'	Stadium: Estádio do Dragão; Attendance: 36,612; Referee: Felix Brych (Germany)

28 September 2011 2	Shakhtar Donetsk (Ukraine)	1–1	(Cyprus) APOEL	Donetsk, Ukraine
21:45 EEST (UTC+3)	Chyzhov (yellow card) 37'; Raț (yellow card) 69'; Jádson 64'	Report	Tričkovski 61'; Pinto (yellow card) 89'; Marcinho (yellow card) 90+3'	Stadium: Donbas Arena; Attendance: 47,014; Referee: Robert Schörgenhofer (Austria)

19 October 2011 3	Shakhtar Donetsk (Ukraine)	2–2	(Russia) Zenit St. Petersburg	Donetsk, Ukraine
21:45 EEST (UTC+3)	Willian 15'; Luiz Adriano 45+1'; Chyzhov (yellow card) 58'; Srna (yellow card) 62'	Report	Alves (yellow card) 3'; Shirokov 33'; Fayzulin 60'; Criscito (yellow card) 62'	Stadium: Donbas Arena; Attendance: 50,578; Referee: Frank De Bleeckere (Belgium)

1 November 2011 4	Zenit St. Petersburg (Russia)	1–0	(Ukraine) Shakhtar Donetsk	Saint Petersburg, Russia
19:00 EET (UTC+2)	Lombaerts 45+1'; Denisov (yellow card) 74'; Lazović (yellow card) 90+1'	Report	Srna (yellow card) 23'; Willian (yellow card) 52'; Luiz Adriano (yellow card) 65'	Stadium: Petrovsky Stadium; Attendance: 21,405; Referee: Stéphane Lannoy (France)

23 November 2011 5	Shakhtar Donetsk (Ukraine)	0–2	(Portugal) Porto	Donetsk, Ukraine
21:45 EET (UTC+2)	Eduardo (yellow card) 50'; Jádson (yellow card) 65'; Kobin (yellow card) 75'	Report	Rodríguez (yellow card) 35'; Hulk 79'; Raț 90+2' (o.g.)	Stadium: Donbas Arena; Attendance: 42,565; Referee: Craig Thomson (Scotland)

6 December 2011 6	APOEL (Cyprus)	0–2	(Ukraine) Shakhtar Donetsk	Nicosia, Cyprus
20:45 EEST (UTC+3)	Tričkovski (yellow card) 8'; Alexandrou (yellow card) 11'; Solari (yellow card) 72'; Oliveira (yellow card) 80'	Report	Rakytskiy (yellow card) 37'; Mkhitaryan (yellow card) 43'; Luiz Adriano 62'; Seleznyov 78'; Shevchuk (yellow card) 82'	Stadium: GSP Stadium; Attendance: 22,537; Referee: Ovidiu Alin Hategan (Romania)

== Squad statistics ==
As of match played 10 May 2012

=== Appearances and goals ===
No.	Pos	Nat	Player	Total		Premier League		Ukrainian Cup		UEFA Champions League		Super Cup	
No.	Pos	Nat	Player	Apps	Goals	Apps	Goals	Apps	Goals	Apps	Goals	Apps	Goals
3	MF	(Czech Republic) CZE	Tomáš Hübschman	28	1	17+3	1	1	0	5+1	0	1	0
5	DF	(Ukraine) UKR	Oleksandr Kucher	32	1	21	0	2+2	1	4+2	0	1	0
7	MF	(Brazil) BRA	Fernandinho	32	6	22+2	4	2+1	1	4	0	1	1
8	MF	(Brazil) BRA	Ilsinho	7	1	3+4	1	0	0	0	0	0	0
9	FW	(Brazil) BRA	Luiz Adriano	36	16	16+8	12	4+1	1	6	3	1	0
10	MF	(Brazil) BRA	Willian	37	6	25+2	5	2+1	0	6	1	1	0
11	FW	(Croatia) CRO	Eduardo	22	7	7+9	5	1	2	3+2	0	0	0
13	DF	(Ukraine) UKR	Vyacheslav Shevchuk	25	3	18	3	2+2	0	2	0	1	0
14	MF	(Ukraine) UKR	Vasyl Kobin	10	0	5+2	0	2	0	1	0	0	0
15	MF	(Ukraine) UKR	Taras Stepanenko	12	0	8+1	0	2+1	0	0	0	0	0
17	FW	(Ukraine) UKR	Yevhen Seleznyov	27	15	13+10	14	0	0	0+3	1	0+1	0
19	MF	(Ukraine) UKR	Oleksiy Gai	13	0	8+1	0	3+1	0	0	0	0	0
20	MF	(Brazil) BRA	Douglas Costa	38	7	15+12	6	2+3	1	2+3	0	1	0
22	MF	(Armenia) ARM	Henrikh Mkhitaryan	37	11	22+4	10	3+1	1	5+1	0	1	0
23	GK	(Ukraine) UKR	Bohdan Shust	1	0	1	0	0	0	0	0	0	0
26	DF	(Romania) ROU	Răzvan Raț	15	0	8	0	3	0	4	0	0	0
27	DF	(Ukraine) UKR	Dmytro Chyhrynskyi	9	0	5+1	0	1	0	2	0	0	0
29	MF	(Brazil) BRA	Alex Teixeira	37	10	12+14	7	5	3	2+3	0	0+1	0
30	GK	(Ukraine) UKR	Andriy Pyatov	15	0	10	0	4	0	0	0	1	0
31	FW	(Brazil) BRA	Dentinho	20	3	7+11	3	2	0	0	0	0	0
33	DF	(Croatia) CRO	Darijo Srna	34	3	25	3	3	0	5	0	1	0
36	DF	(Ukraine) UKR	Oleksandr Chyzhov	7	0	2+1	0	2	0	2	0	0	0
38	DF	(Ukraine) UKR	Sergiy Kryvtsov	6	0	5	0	1	0	0	0	0	0
44	DF	(Ukraine) UKR	Yaroslav Rakytskiy	37	2	27	2	4+1	0	4	0	1	0
70	MF	(Brazil) BRA	Alan Patrick	2	1	0+1	0	1	1	0	0	0	0
Players away from Shakhtar Donetsk on loan:
92	MF	(Russia) RUS	Roman Yemelyanov	1	0	0+1	0	0	0	0	0	0	0
Players that left Shakhtar Donetsk during the season:
8	MF	(Brazil) BRA	Jádson	17	4	9+2	3	1+1	0	3+1	1	0	0
25	GK	(Ukraine) UKR	Oleksandr Rybka	26	0	19	0	1	0	6	0	0	0
99	FW	(Bolivia) BOL	Marcelo Moreno	2	1	0	0	1	1	0+1	0	0	0

=== Goal scorers ===
Place	Position	Nation	Number	Name	Premier League	Ukrainian Cup	UEFA Champions League	Super Cup	Total
1	FW	(Brazil)	9	Luiz Adriano	12	1	3	0	16
2	FW	(Ukraine)	17	Yevhen Seleznyov	14	0	1	0	15
3	MF	(Armenia)	22	Henrikh Mkhitaryan	10	1	0	0	11
4	MF	(Brazil)	29	Alex Teixeira	7	3	0	0	10
5	MF	(Brazil)	20	Douglas Costa	6	1	0	0	7
5	FW	(Croatia)	11	Eduardo	5	2	0	0	7
7	MF	(Brazil)	10	Willian	5	0	1	0	6
7	MF	(Brazil)	7	Fernandinho	4	1	0	1	6
9	MF	(Brazil)	8	Jádson	3	0	1	0	4
10	FW	(Brazil)	31	Dentinho	3	0	0	0	3
10	DF	(Croatia)	33	Darijo Srna	3	0	0	0	3
10	DF	(Ukraine)	13	Vyacheslav Shevchuk	3	0	0	0	3
13	DF	(Ukraine)	44	Yaroslav Rakytskiy	2	0	0	0	2
14	MF	(Czech Republic)	3	Tomáš Hübschman	1	0	0	0	1
14	MF	(Brazil)	8	Ilsinho	1	0	0	0	1
14	MF	(Brazil)	70	Alan Patrick	0	1	0	0	1
14	FW	(Bolivia)	99	Marcelo Moreno	0	1	0	0	1
14	DF	(Ukraine)	5	Oleksandr Kucher	0	1	0	0	1
14				Own goal	1	0	0	0	1
				TOTALS	80	12	6	1	99

=== Clean sheets ===
Place	Position	Nation	Number	Name	Premier League	Ukrainian Cup	UEFA Champions League	Super Cup	Total
1	GK	(Ukraine)	25	Oleksandr Rybka	11	0	1	0	12
2	GK	(Ukraine)	30	Andriy Pyatov	4	2	0	0	6
				TOTALS	15	2	1	0	18

=== Disciplinary record ===
Number	Nation	Position	Name	Premier League		Ukrainian Cup		UEFA Champions League		Super Cup		Total	
Number	Nation	Position	Name	Yellow card	Red card	Yellow card	Red card	Yellow card	Red card	Yellow card	Red card	Yellow card	Red card
3	(Czech Republic)	MF	Tomáš Hübschman	2	0	0	0	0	0	0	0	2	0
5	(Ukraine)	DF	Oleksandr Kucher	8	1	0	0	0	0	0	0	8	1
7	(Brazil)	MF	Fernandinho	4	0	2	0	0	0	1	0	7	0
9	(Brazil)	FW	Luiz Adriano	2	0	0	0	2	0	0	0	4	0
10	(Brazil)	MF	Willian	1	0	0	0	1	0	0	0	2	0
11	(Croatia)	FW	Eduardo	1	0	1	0	1	0	0	0	2	0
13	(Ukraine)	DF	Vyacheslav Shevchuk	5	0	0	0	1	0	0	0	6	0
14	(Ukraine)	MF	Vasyl Kobin	1	0	2	0	1	0	0	0	4	0
15	(Ukraine)	MF	Taras Stepanenko	3	0	1	0	0	0	0	0	4	0
17	(Ukraine)	FW	Yevhen Seleznyov	4	0	0	0	0	0	0	0	4	0
19	(Ukraine)	MF	Oleksiy Gai	1	0	0	0	0	0	0	0	1	0
20	(Brazil)	MF	Douglas Costa	5	0	0	0	0	0	0	0	5	0
22	(Armenia)	MF	Henrikh Mkhitaryan	3	0	2	0	1	0	0	0	6	0
26	(Romania)	DF	Răzvan Raț	0	0	0	0	1	0	0	0	1	0
27	(Ukraine)	DF	Dmytro Chyhrynskyi	1	0	0	0	2	1	0	0	3	1
29	(Brazil)	MF	Alex Teixeira	2	0	0	0	0	0	1	0	3	0
30	(Ukraine)	GK	Andriy Pyatov	1	0	1	0	0	0	0	0	2	0
31	(Brazil)	FW	Dentinho	2	0	0	0	0	0	0	0	2	0
33	(Croatia)	DF	Darijo Srna	10	0	0	0	1	0	1	0	12	0
36	(Ukraine)	DF	Oleksandr Chyzhov	0	0	0	0	2	0	0	0	2	0
38	(Ukraine)	DF	Serhiy Kryvtsov	2	0	0	0	0	0	0	0	2	0
44	(Ukraine)	DF	Yaroslav Rakytskiy	6	1	1	0	3	1	0	0	10	2
Players away on loan:
Players who left Shakhtar Donetsk during the season:
8	(Brazil)	MF	Jádson	0	0	0	0	1	0	0	0	1	0
25	(Ukraine)	GK	Oleksandr Rybka	0	0	1	0	0	0	0	0	1	0
			TOTALS	64	2	11	0	17	2	3	0	95	4
