= 2007–08 in Australian soccer =

Soccer in Australia
- Season: 2007–08

Men's soccer
- A-League Premiership: Central Coast Mariners
- A-League Championship: Newcastle Jets
- Pre-Season Challenge Cup: Adelaide United

The 2007–08 season was the 39th season of national competitive soccer in Australia and 125th overall.

== National teams ==
=== Australia national soccer team ===
==== Results and fixtures ====
===== Friendlies =====
11 September 2007	Australia	0–1	Argentina	Melbourne, Australia
		Report	Demichelis 49'	Stadium: Melbourne Cricket Ground; Attendance: 70,171; Referee: Mike Dean

17 November 2007	Australia	1–0	Nigeria	London, England
	Carney 52'			Stadium: Craven Cottage; Attendance: 11,953; Referee: Mark Clatenburg

22 March 2008	Singapore	0–0	Australia	Singapore
		Report		Stadium: National Stadium; Attendance: 6,282; Referee: Veerapool Prayoon

23 May 2008	Australia	1–0	Ghana	Sydney, Australia
	Sterjovski 47'			Stadium: Sydney Football Stadium; Attendance: 29,910; Referee: Hajime Matsuo

===== World Cup 2010 qualifying =====
====== Group 1 ======
Team	Pld	W	D	L	GF	GA	GD	Pts	(Australia)	(Qatar)	(Iraq)	(China)
Australia	6	3	1	2	7	3	+4	10	—	3–0	1–0	0–1
Qatar	6	3	1	2	5	6	−1	10	1–3	—	2–0	0–0
Iraq	6	2	1	3	4	6	−2	7	1–0	0–1	—	1–1
China	6	1	3	2	3	4	−1	6	0–0	0–1	1–2	—

Legend: Blue = home team win; Yellow = draw; Red = away team win.

6 February 2008 1	Australia	3–0	Qatar	Melbourne, Australia
	Kennedy 10'; Cahill 18'; Bresciano 33'			Stadium: Telstra Dome; Attendance: 50,969; Referee: Subkhiddin Mohd Salleh (Malaysia)

26 March 2008 2	China	0–0	Australia	Kunming, China
				Stadium: Kunming Tuodong Sports Center; Attendance: 33,000; Referee: Mohamed Omar Al Saeedi (United Arab Emirates)

1 June 2008 3	Australia	1–0	Iraq	Brisbane, Australia
	Kewell 47'			Stadium: Lang Park; Attendance: 48,678; Referee: Ravshan Irmatov (Uzbekistan)

7 June 2008 4	Iraq	1–0	Australia	Dubai, United Arab Emirates
	Emad 27'			Stadium: Al-Ahli Stadium; Attendance: 8,000; Referee: Kazuhiko Matsumura (Japan)

14 June 2008 5	Qatar	1–3	Australia	Doha, Qatar
	Ibrahim 89'		Emerton 17', 56'; Kewell 74'	Stadium: Jassim bin Hamad Stadium; Attendance: 12,000; Referee: Gi Young Lee (South Korea)

22 June 2008 6	Australia	0–1	China	Sydney, Australia
			Sun 11'	Stadium: Sydney Football Stadium; Attendance: 70,054; Referee: Khalil Ibrahim Al Ghamdi (Saudi Arabia)

=== Men's under-23 ===
==== Friendlies ====
The following is a list of friendlies played by the men's senior national team in 2007–08.

2 March 2008	Australia	1–1	Mexico	San Francisco, United States
	Hearfield 88'	Report	D'Apuzzo 18' (o.g.)	Stadium: McAfee Coliseum; Attendance: 47,440

15 May 2008 Intercontinental Cup group stage	Australia	3–0	Croatia	Kuala Lumpur, Malaysia
	Rukavytsya 19'; Hearfield 52'; Troisi 74'	Report		Stadium: Kuala Lumpur Stadium

18 May 2008 Intercontinental Cup group stage	Australia	2–1	Chile	Kuala Lumpur, Malaysia
	Simon 25'; Zadkovich 60'	Report

20 May 2008 Intercontinental Cup group stage	Australia	4–0	Togo	Kuala Lumpur, Malaysia
	Hoffman 7'; Downes 42'; Zullo 65'; Simon 70'	Report

23 May 2008 Intercontinental Cup semifinal	Australia	3–1	Republic of Ireland	Kuala Lumpur, Malaysia
	Simon 7', 13', 75'	Report	Judge 85'

25 May 2008 Intercontinental Cup final	Australia	0–2	Nigeria	Kuala Lumpur, Malaysia
		Report	Okorowanta 7'; Sarki 85'	Referee: Krishnan Ramachandran (Malaysia)

28 June 2008	Australia	3–4	Chile	Darwin, Australia
	Downes 20', 68'; Hearfield 76'	Report	Paredes 26', 85'; Sagredo 47'; Vargas 82'	Stadium: Darwin Football Stadium; Attendance: 1,404; Referee: Ben Williams (Australia)

29 June 2008	Australia	1–1	Chile	Darwin, Australia
	Sarkies 27' (pen.)	Report	Seymour 67'	Stadium: Darwin Football Stadium; Attendance: 1,780; Referee: Peter Green (Australia)

==== 2008 Summer Olympics – Men's Asian Qualifiers ====
22 August 2007 Preliminary Round 3	Iraq	0–0	Australia	Al Rayyan, Qatar
		Report		Stadium: Ahmed bin Ali Stadium; Attendance: 1,500; Referee: Sun Baojie (China)

8 September 2007 Preliminary Round 3	Australia	1–0	North Korea	Newcastle, Australia
	Milligan 49'	Report		Stadium: EnergyAustralia Stadium; Attendance: 4,903; Referee: Hiroyoshi Takayama (Japan)

12 September 2007 Preliminary Round 3	Australia	3–0	Lebanon	Gosford, Australia
	Ward 6'	Report		Stadium: Bluetongue Stadium; Attendance: 4,171; Referee: Kadyrbek Chynybekov ()

17 October 2007 Preliminary Round 3	Lebanon	0–0	Australia	Beirut, Lebanon
		Report		Stadium: Beirut Municipal Stadium; Attendance: 350; Referee: Lee Gi-young (South Korea)

17 November 2007 Preliminary Round 3	Australia	2–0	Iraq	Gosford, Australia
	Leijer 18'; Milligan 58'	Report		Stadium: Bluetongue Stadium; Attendance: 13,888; Referee: Malik Abdul Bashir (Singapore)

21 November 2007 Preliminary Round 3	North Korea	1–1	Australia	Pyongyang, North Korea
	Pak 10'	Report	Milligan 71'	Stadium: Kim Il-sung Stadium; Attendance: 8,500; Referee: Muhsen Basma (Syria)

=== Men's under-20 ===
==== Friendlies ====
The following is a list of friendlies played by the men's senior national team in 2007–08.

27 July 2007 Weifang Cup	Australia	1–0	South Korea	Weifang, China
	M. Mullen 73'	Report

29 July 2007 Weifang Cup	Australia	4–1	Iran	Weifang, China
	Holland 8', 76'; Lujic 26', 89'	Report	60'

31 July 2007 Weifang Cup	China	1–0	Australia	Weifang, China
	86'	Report

5 August 2007 Weifang Cup	Australia	1–0	Uzbekistan	Weifang, China
	M. Mullen 31'	Report

==== 2008 AFC U-19 Championship qualification ====
6 November 2007	Australia	2–0	Indonesia	Ho Chi Minh City, Vietnam
	D. Mullen 60'; Nichols 80'	Report		Stadium: Thanh Long Sports Centre; Attendance: 1,500; Referee: Yang Zhiqiang (China)

8 November 2007	Australia	2–0	Vietnam	Ho Chi Minh City, Vietnam
	Nichols 73'; Cernak 80'	Report		Stadium: Thanh Long Sports Centre; Attendance: 2,000; Referee: Mahmoud Turki (Syria)

10 November 2007	Guatemala	0–15	Australia	Ho Chi Minh City, Vietnam
		Report	Nichols 9', 34', 51'; Minniecon 15', 40'; Trifiro 31', 45+1'; Jesic 45+2'; Lujic 53'; Hoffman 60'; Cernak 70'; Sebastian Ryall 74', 80'; Theodore 85'; DeVere 90+4'	Stadium: Thanh Long Sports Centre; Attendance: 500; Referee: Rustam Saidov (Uzbekistan)

14 November 2007	South Korea	4–0	Australia	Ho Chi Minh City, Vietnam
	Kim Bo-kyung 3'; Kim Dong-sub 28'; Cho Young-cheol 40'; Park Seung-il 69'	Report		Stadium: Thanh Long Sports Centre; Attendance: 1,000; Referee: Mohamad Mansour (Lebanon)

=== Men's under-17 ===
==== Friendlies ====
The following is a list of friendlies played by the men's senior national team in 2007–08.

9 August 2007 Toyota International Youth Cup	Japan	3–0	Australia	Nagoya, Japan
	70'	Report

11 August 2007 Toyota International Youth Cup	Australia	0–3	United States	Nagoya, Japan
		Report

13 August 2007 Toyota International Youth Cup	Australia	3–0	South Korea	Nagoya, Japan
	DiLizia; Ibrahim; Warren	Report

==== AFC U-16 Championship qualification ====
17 October 2007	Malaysia	0–2	Australia	Singapore
		Report	Warren 14'; Babalj 26'	Stadium: Jalan Besar Stadium; Attendance: 200; Referee: Ram Krishna Gosh (Bangladesh)

17 October 2007	Australia	0–0	North Korea	Singapore
		Report		Stadium: Jalan Besar Stadium; Attendance: 500; Referee: Võ Minh Trí (Vietnam

=== Women's senior ===
==== Results and fixtures ====
===== Friendlies =====
1 March 2008	Australia	2–0	New Zealand	Sydney, Australia
	Walsh 16'; Burgess 54'	Report		Stadium: Stockland Park

3 March 2008	Australia	2–1	New Zealand	Sydney, Australia
	Gill 22'; Chapman 47'	Report	Kete 30'	Stadium: Stockland Park

5 March 2008	Australia	4–2	New Zealand	Sydney, Australia
	McCallum 9'; Salisbury 58' (pen.); Polkinghorne 90'	Report	Smith 13'; Moorwood 45'	Stadium: Stockland Park

27 April 2008	United States	3–2	Australia	Cary, North Carolina, United States
	Kai 35'; Wambach 49'; Lloyd 90'	Report	Gill 86'; Salisbury 88'	Stadium: WakeMed Soccer Park; Attendance: 3,698; Referee: Margaret Domka (United States)

3 May 2008	United States	5–4	Australia	Birmingham, Alabama, United States
	Tarpley 28', 42'; Wambach 29', 46'; Hucles 90+4'	Report	Whitehill 19' (o.g.); Walsh 49'; Colthorpe 64'; Rampone 69' (o.g.)	Stadium: Legion Field; Attendance: 5,000; Referee: Sandra Serafini (United States)

23 May 2008	Australia	2–1	Canada	Sydney, Australia
	Chapman 22'; Munoz 40'	Report	Lang 55'	Stadium: Sydney Football Stadium; Referee: Tammy Ogston (Australia)

15 June 2008	Australia	1–2	United States	Suwon, South Korea
	Garriock 57'	Report	Kai 35'; Wambach 77'	Stadium: Suwon Sports Complex; Attendance: 1,357; Referee: Bibiana Steinhaus (Germany)

17 June 2008	Australia	3–0	Italy	Suwon, South Korea
	Garriock 66', 68'; Chapman 89'	Report		Stadium: Suwon Sports Complex

19 June 2008	Australia	1–0	Brazil	Suwon, South Korea
	Simon 90'			Stadium: Suwon Sports Complex; Attendance: 1,075

===== Women's World Cup 2007 =====
====== Group C ======
Pos	Team	Pld	W	D	L	GF	GA	GD	Pts	Qualification
1	Norway	3	2	1	0	10	4	+6	7	Advance to knockout stage
2	Australia	3	1	2	0	7	4	+3	5	Advance to knockout stage
3	Canada	3	1	1	1	7	4	+3	4	
4	Ghana	3	0	0	3	3	15	−12	0	

Source: FIFA

12 September 2007 1	Ghana	1–4	Australia	Hangzhou, China
	Amankwa 70'	Report	Walsh 15'; De Vanna 57', 81'; Garriock 69'	Stadium: Hangzhou Dragon Stadium; Attendance: 30,752; Referee: Adriana Correa (Colombia)

15 September 2007 2	Australia	1–1	Norway	Hangzhou, China
	De Vanna 83'	Report	Gulbrandsen 5'	Stadium: Hangzhou Dragon Stadium; Attendance: 33,835; Referee: Huijin Niu (China)

20 September 2007 3	Australia	2–2	Canada	Chengdu, China
	McCallum 53'; Salisbury 90+2'	Report	Tancredi 1'; Christine Sinclair 85'	Stadium: Chengu Sports Center Stadium; Attendance: 29,300; Referee: Gyoengi Gaal (Hungary)

====== Knockout stage ======
23 September 2007 Quarter-finals	Brazil	3–2	Australia	Tianjin, China
	Formiga 4'; Marta 23' (pen.); Rozeira 75'	Report	De Vanna 36'; Colthorpe 68'	Stadium: Olympic Center Stadium; Attendance: 35,061; Referee: Christine Beck (Germany)

===== Women's Asian Cup 2008 =====
====== Group B ======
Team	Pld	W	D	L	GF	GA	GD	Pts
Japan	3	2	0	1	15	4	+11	6
Australia	3	2	0	1	7	3	+4	6
South Korea	3	2	0	1	5	3	+2	6
Chinese Taipei	3	0	0	3	0	17	−17	0

29 May 2008 1	Australia	4–0	Chinese Taipei	Ho Chi Minh, Vietnam
	Garriock 19', 42'; Tristram 51'; De Vanna 82'	Report		Stadium: Thống Nhất Stadium; Attendance: 600; Referee: Hong Sil Ri (North Korea)

31 May 2008 2	South Korea	0–2	Australia	Ho Chi Minh, Vietnam
		Report	Perry 30'; De Vanna 69'	Stadium: Thống Nhất Stadium; Attendance: 300; Referee: Bentla D'Coth (India)

2 June 2008 3	Australia	1–3	Japan	Ho Chi Minh, Vietnam
	Polkinghorne 70'	Report	Ando 8'; Nagasato 33'; Miyama 50'	Stadium: Thống Nhất Stadium; Attendance: 300; Referee: Hong Sil Ri (North Korea)

====== Knockout stage ======
5 June 2008 Semi-finals	North Korea	3–0	Australia	Ho Chi Minh, Vietnam
	Kum-suk 2', 41', 60'	Report		Stadium: Thống Nhất Stadium; Attendance: 2,700; Referee: Pannipar Kamneung (Thailand)

8 June 2008 Third place play-off	Australia	0–3	Japan	Ho Chi Minh, Vietnam
		Report	Nagasato 15'; Miyama 78'; Sawa 86'	Stadium: Thống Nhất Stadium; Attendance: 1,200; Referee: Hong Eun-ah (South Korea)

=== Women's under-20 ===
==== Friendlies ====
The following is a list of friendlies played by the women's under-20 national team in 2007–08.

28 September 2007	China	1–0	Australia	Chengdu, China
	33'	Report

30 September 2007	China	0–0	Australia	Chengdu, China
		Report

==== AFC U-19 Women's Championship ====
6 October 2007	Japan	1–0	Australia	Chongqing, China
	Kira 21'	Report		Stadium: Chongqing Olympic Sports Center; Attendance: 300; Referee: Pannipar Kamueng (Thailand)

8 October 2007	Australia	1–2	North Korea	Chongqing, China
	Butt 13' (pen.)	Report	Cha Hu-nam 41'; Ra Un-sim 83' (pen.)	Stadium: Chongqing Olympic Sports Center; Attendance: 1,000; Referee: Wang Jia (China)

10 October 2007	Australia	2–1	Myanmar	Chongqing, China
	Connor 33'; Simon 53'	Report	Mu Mu Lwin 32'	Stadium: Chongqing Olympic Sports Center; Attendance: 150; Referee: Praew Semaksuk (Thailand)

=== Women's under-17 ===
==== Friendlies ====
The following is a list of friendlies played by the women's under-17 national team in 2007–08.

29 January 2008	Australia	0–6	United States	Auckland, New Zealand
		Report	S. Mewis 32', 41', 67'; DiMartino 40'; K. Mewis 59'; Verloo 79'	Stadium: North Harbour Stadium

31 January 2008	Australia	1–5	Germany	Auckland, New Zealand
	van Egmond 44'	Report	Huth 4'; Knaak 26'; Zumbült 33'; Doppler 62'; Popp 81'	Stadium: North Harbour Stadium

2 February 2008	New Zealand	0–1	Australia	Auckland, New Zealand
		Report	Tabain 44' (pen.)	Stadium: North Harbour Stadium

15 April 2008	Australia	0–4	New Zealand	Canberra, Australia
		Report	Wall 16', 86'; Pearl 35'; Campbell 77'	Stadium: Australian Institute of Sport

17 April 2008	Australia	0–4	New Zealand	Canberra, Australia
		Report	Murray 3', 40'; McLaughlin 23', 33'	Stadium: Australian Institute of Sport

== AFC competitions ==
=== AFC Champions League ===
==== Group stage ====
===== Group E =====
Team	Pld	W	D	L	GF	GA	GD	Pts
(Australia) Adelaide United	6	4	2	0	9	2	+7	14
(China) Changchun Yatai	6	3	3	0	10	3	+7	12
(South Korea) Pohang Steelers	6	1	2	3	6	7	−1	5
(Vietnam) Bình Dương	6	0	1	5	4	17	−13	1

===== Group G =====
Team	Pld	W	D	L	GF	GA	GD	Pts
(Japan) Gamba Osaka	6	4	2	0	14	8	+6	14
(Australia) Melbourne Victory	6	2	1	3	10	11	−1	7
(South Korea) Chunnam Dragons	6	1	3	2	8	10	−2	6
(Thailand) Chonburi	6	1	2	3	7	10	−3	5

==== Knockout stage ====
===== Quarter-finals =====
Team 1	Agg.	Team 2	1st leg	2nd leg
Kashima Antlers (Japan)	1–2	(Australia) Adelaide United	1–1	0–1

===== Semi-finals =====
Team 1	Agg.	Team 2	1st leg	2nd leg
Adelaide United (Australia)	3–1	(Uzbekistan) Bunyodkor	3–0	0–1

===== Final =====
Team 1	Agg.	Team 2	1st leg	2nd leg
Gamba Osaka (Japan)	5–0	(Australia) Adelaide United	3–0	2–0

== Men's soccer ==
=== A-League ===
Pos	Team	Pld	W	D	L	GF	GA	GD	Pts	Qualification
1	Central Coast Mariners	21	10	4	7	30	25	+5	34	Qualification for 2009 AFC Champions League group stage and Finals series (Note: First place qualifies for the 2009 AFC Champions League group stage. Winning the 2008 A-League Grand Final earns qualification for the 2009 AFC Champions League group stage, unless the Grand Final winners are also first place, in which case the Grand Final runner up qualifies.)
2	Newcastle Jets (C)	21	9	7	5	25	21	+4	34	Qualification for 2009 AFC Champions League group stage and Finals series
3	Sydney FC	21	8	8	5	28	24	+4	32	Qualification for 2008 Pan-Pacific Championship and Finals series
4	Queensland Roar	21	8	7	6	25	21	+4	31	Qualification for Finals series
5	Melbourne Victory	21	6	9	6	29	29	0	27	
6	Adelaide United	21	6	8	7	31	29	+2	26	
7	Perth Glory	21	4	8	9	27	34	−7	20	
8	Wellington Phoenix (Note: Wellington Phoenix cannot qualify for the AFC Champions League as they are not recognised as an AFC club.)	21	5	5	11	25	37	−12	20	

Source: ultimatealeague.com
Rules for classification: 1) points; 2) goal difference; 3) number of goals scored.
(C) Champions
Notes:

Semifinals
2	Newcastle Jets	2	0	2
1	Central Coast Mariners	0	3	3
3	Sydney FC	0	0	0
4	Queensland Roar	0	2	2

Preliminary final
2	Newcastle Jets (a.e.t.)	3
4	Queensland Roar	2

Final
1	Central Coast Mariners	0
2	Newcastle Jets	1

=== Cup competitions ===
==== Pre-Season Challenge Cup ====
===== Final =====
12 August 2007
15:00 ACST

Adelaide United	2–1	Perth Glory
Djite 65'; Cássio 83'		Bertos 45'

Hindmarsh Stadium, Adelaide
Attendance: 9,606
Referee: Ben Williams

== Retirements ==
- 1 July 2007: Paul Okon, 35, former Marconi Stallions and Newcastle Jets midfielder.
- 1 July 2007: Fernando Rech, 33, former Brisbane Strikers and Parramatta Power striker.
- 1 January 2008: Brendan Renaud, 34, former Marconi Stallions, Parramatta Power, St George, Blacktown City and Sydney FC midfielder.
- 1 February 2008: Craig Deans, 33, former Fremantle Spirit and Newcastle Jets centre-back.
- 1 February 2008: Tony Vidmar, 37, former Adelaide City and Central Coast Mariners left-back.
- 1 March 2008: Damien Brown, 33, former Central Coast Mariners, Canberra Cosmos, Parramatta Power and Newcastle Jets midfielder.
- 21 April 2008: Stan Lazaridis, 35, former West Adelaide left midfielder.
- 12 July 2008: Richie Alagich, 34, former West Adelaide, South Melbourne, Brisbane Strikers and Adelaide United right-back.
