= Willian (footballer, born 1988) =

Brazilian footballer (born 1988)

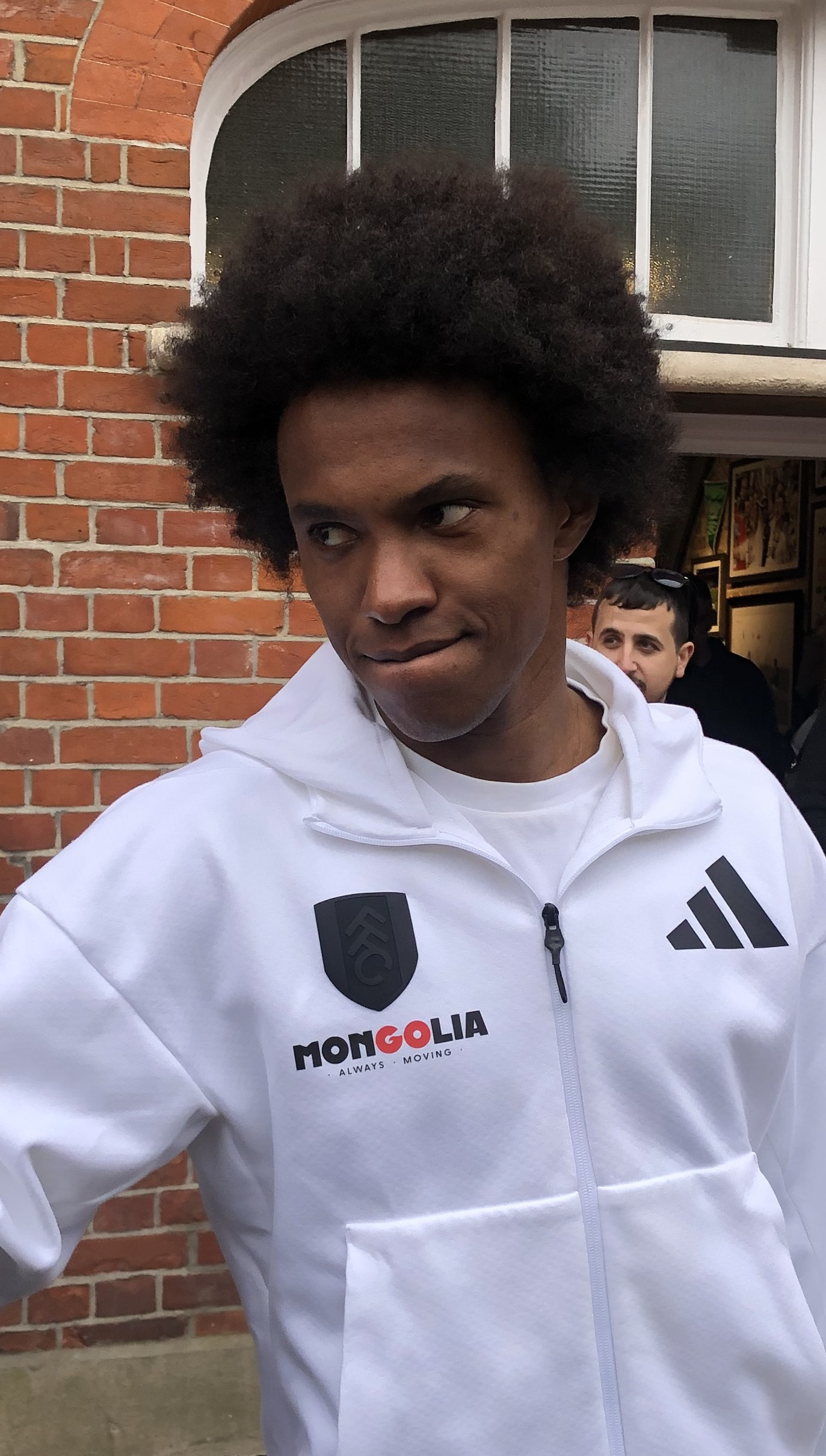
- Willian with Fulham in 2025

Personal information
- Full name: Willian Borges da Silva
- Date of birth: 9 August 1988 (age 38)
- Place of birth: Ribeirão Pires, Brazil
- Height: 1.75 m (5 ft 9 in)
- Positions: Winger; attacking midfielder; wide midfielder

Youth career
- 1998–2006: Corinthians
- 2005: → Mauaense (loan)

Senior career*
Years	Team	Apps	(Gls)
2006–2007	Corinthians	37	(2)
2007–2013	Shakhtar Donetsk	140	(20)
2013	Anzhi Makhachkala	11	(1)
2013–2020	Chelsea	234	(37)
2020–2021	Arsenal	25	(1)
2021–2022	Corinthians	35	(1)
2022–2024	Fulham	58	(9)
2024	Olympiacos	6	(0)
2025	Fulham	10	(0)
2025–2026	Grêmio	25	(1)

International career
2007	Brazil U20	12	(0)
2011–2019	Brazil	70	(9)
Medal record
Men's football
Representing Brazil
Copa América
Winner	2019 Brazil
South American Youth Championship
Winner	2007 Paraguay
- * Club domestic league appearances and goals as of 17 July 2026 (UTC)

Willian Borges da Silva (born 9 August 1988), known mononymously as Willian, is a Brazilian professional footballer. Primarily a winger throughout his career, he can also operate as an attacking midfielder or wide midfielder.

Willian began his career at Corinthians before joining Shakhtar Donetsk in August 2007 for a fee of €14 million. During his six years at the club, he won several honours, including four Ukrainian Premier League titles and the UEFA Cup in 2009. In 2013, he briefly signed with Anzhi Makhachkala before moving to Chelsea for £30 million, winning the Premier League and the League Cup in his second season in England. He signed for Arsenal in August 2020 before re-signing for boyhood club Corinthians the following year.

Willian made his debut for Brazil in 2011 and had since represented his country at the 2014 and 2018 FIFA World Cups, as well as the 2015 Copa América, the Copa América Centenario, and the 2019 Copa América, a tournament Brazil won on home soil.

== Club career ==
=== Corinthians ===
Willian started playing futsal at six years old in his hometown of Ribeirão Pires. In 1998, he joined the Corinthians youth system. In 2005, at the age of 17, he was already part of the squad that won the Copa São Paulo de Futebol Júnior. He was also among the Corinthians loanees who briefly played for Grêmio Mauaense in the 2005 Campeonato Paulista Série A3.

In 2007, Willian began playing for the Corinthians first team. He made five league appearances during his first season with the senior side as Corinthians finished mid-table. His breakthrough came with Corinthians in the following campaign, featuring in 11 league matches, scoring twice, and making 29 appearances in all competitions for the club. Although they were 13th when Willian was sold, they ended up finishing 17th in the Série A and were relegated for the first time in the club's history.

=== Shakhtar Donetsk ===
==== 2007–08 season ====
On 23 August 2007, Willian signed a five-year contract with Shakhtar Donetsk for a transfer fee of €14 million. His debut for the club came on 15 September in a 2–1 league victory over Chornomorets Odesa, where he came on as a 57th-minute substitute, replacing fellow Brazilian Jádson. Willian scored his first goal for the club on 31 October in a 4–1 victory over Arsenal Kyiv in the Ukrainian Cup. He made his European debut on 6 November in a 3–0 Champions League defeat to A.C. Milan, coming on as a 73rd-minute replacement for Răzvan Raț.

Willian ended his first season with Shakhtar with 31 total appearances, 28 of which came in the league, scoring three league goals. He helped Shakhtar to a Vyshcha Liha and Ukrainian Cup double, as they won the league by three points over Dynamo Kyiv and defeated them 2–0 in the 2008 Ukrainian Cup final.

==== 2008–09 season ====
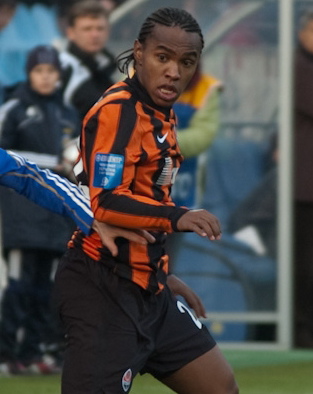
Willian playing for Shakhtar Donetsk in 2009

He played in the Super Cup penalty shootout victory over Dynamo Kyiv on 15 July, being replaced by Brandão after 46 minutes. On 27 August, he scored a goal in a 3–1 victory over Dinamo Zagreb in the Champions League. On 1 November, he scored his first league goal for Shakhtar in a 3–1 win against Zorya Luhansk. On 16 November, he scored the only goal in a 1–0 victory over Dynamo Kyiv. He scored the decisive goal in a 1–0 victory against Chornomorets Odesa on 25 April.

Willian played in Shakhtar's UEFA Cup Final 2–1 extra time victory against Werder Bremen, helping Shakhtar lift the last UEFA Cup title before it was rebranded as the UEFA Europa League. He made 52 appearances in the 2008–09 season, scoring eight goals. He appeared in all but one league match, scoring five goals, and also netted a goal in a Ukrainian Cup round of 16 tie against Zakarpattia Uzhhorod, which Shakhtar won 4–1.

==== 2009–10 season ====
Willian's first goal of the season came in a 6–1 Ukrainian Cup round of 32 victory against Dniester Ovidiopol on 15 August. He made an appearance in Shakhtar's 1–0 extra time defeat to Spanish side Barcelona in the UEFA Super Cup on 28 August, being replaced by Julius Aghahowa in the 90th minute of the match. On 17 September, he netted the second goal in a 4–1 win against Belgian side Club Brugge in a group stage match in the Europa League. He ended the season with seven goals in 39 appearances, including 22 appearances and five goals in the league. He helped Shakhtar to victory in the Ukrainian Premier League. They finished the league with 77 points, six ahead of nearest rivals Dynamo Kyiv.

==== 2010–11 season ====
Willian started the season with a goal in Shakhtar's emphatic 7–1 victory against Tavriya Simferopol in the Super Cup on 4 July. He followed that up on 10 July with the second goal in the first league match of the season, a 2–0 victory over Kryvbas Kryvyi Rih. On 15 August, he netted the only goal in a 1–0 victory against Karpaty Lviv, scoring in first-half stoppage time. He also scored the only goal in a 1–0 win against Illichivets Mariupol on 29 August. On 8 March, he scored two goals in a Champions League last 16 tie against Roma, with Shakhtar winning 3–0 on the night and progressing to the quarter-final after winning 6–2 on aggregate. He played in the 2–0 victory over Dynamo Kyiv in the Ukrainian Cup Final on 25 May, being replaced by Alex Teixeira after 77 minutes. He ended the season with eight goals from 43 appearances, including 23 league appearances and three league goals. Shakhtar retained their league title with a score of 72 points, seven points ahead of second-placed team Dynamo Kyiv. They added the Ukrainian Cup and Super Cup titles to clinch a domestic treble.

==== 2011–12 season ====
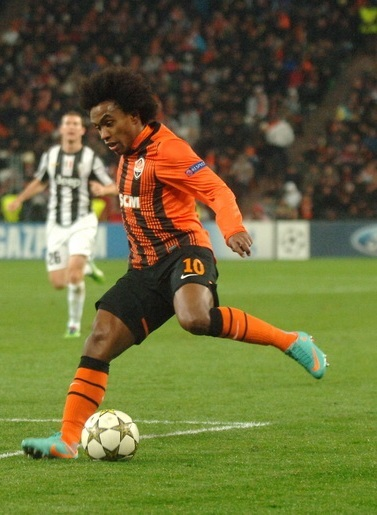
Willian playing for Shakhtar Donetsk in 2012

The following season, Willian played the full 90 minutes in the Super Cup match against Dynamo Kyiv on 5 July; however, Shakhtar lost the match 3–1. On 19 October, he scored the opening goal in a 2–2 draw with Zenit Saint Petersburg in the Champions League. He scored the second goal in a 2–1 win over Illichivets Mariupol on 10 March. On 6 May, he played the full match in a 2–1 extra-time victory against Metalurh Donetsk in the Ukrainian Cup Final. He finished the season with six goals—five in the league—from 37 appearances, 27 of which came in the league. Shakhtar secured the Ukrainian Premier League title for the third year in a row and the Ukrainian Cup title for a second consecutive season.

==== 2012–13 season ====
Shakhtar opened the season with a 2–0 win against Metalurh Donetsk in the Super Cup; however, Willian did not make the squad for the match. He had to wait until the fourth league match of the season, on 6 August, to make his first appearance, in a 4–0 win against Volyn Lutsk. He replaced goalscorer Alex Teixeira after 46 minutes. On 19 August, he scored his first goal of the season and provided two assists in a comprehensive 5–1 victory against Chornomorets Odesa. Willian scored both of Shakhtar's goals in their 3–2 loss to reigning European champions Chelsea in the Champions League group stage on 7 November.

=== Anzhi Makhachkala ===
On 31 January 2013, Willian moved to Anzhi Makhachkala for a fee thought to be in the region of €35 million. He originally chose to wear the number 10; however, due to UEFA restrictions stating that a player must wear a number used in the Champions League for the remainder of the season, he was forced to wear the number 88, which he had chosen at Shakhtar. After moving to Russia, Willian said he was happy to join Anzhi and wished Shakhtar Donetsk great success in the future. On his debut, Willian sustained an injury against Newcastle United in a Europa League match. He scored his only goal for Anzhi on 14 April 2013 in a 3–0 victory against Volga Nizhny Novgorod.

In August 2013, following financial restructuring, Anzhi chose to transfer their entire squad, including recent signing Willian.

=== Chelsea ===
==== 2013–14 season ====
On 25 August 2013, English Premier League club Chelsea agreed to a deal to sign Willian for a fee of £30 million, subject to a work permit hearing on 28 August 2013. The deal was made official on 28 August 2013, and Willian signed a five-year contract, receiving the number 22 shirt. Although regulations usually state that non-EU players must be regular internationals, Willian was given a work permit despite only having two caps at the time, as an FA panel deemed that if he were not Brazilian, he would have been a regular international and therefore would have had more caps.

Prior to signing for Chelsea, Willian had attracted interest from Chelsea's London rivals Tottenham. He completed a medical at Tottenham before meeting with Chelsea, which caused confusion as to which club he would sign for. Willian claims Chelsea was his first preference, and he would have only signed with Tottenham if the deal with Chelsea had fallen through.

Willian made his debut on 18 September against Basel in the Champions League, in a 2–1 home defeat. After featuring in wins against Swindon Town and Steaua București in the League Cup and Champions League respectively, he made his league debut on 6 October away to Norwich City, and scored in a 3–1 win. He scored his second Chelsea goal on 1 January 2014 in a 3–0 victory at Southampton. On 27 April 2014, Willian scored in Chelsea's 2–0 away victory against Liverpool.

==== 2014–15 season ====
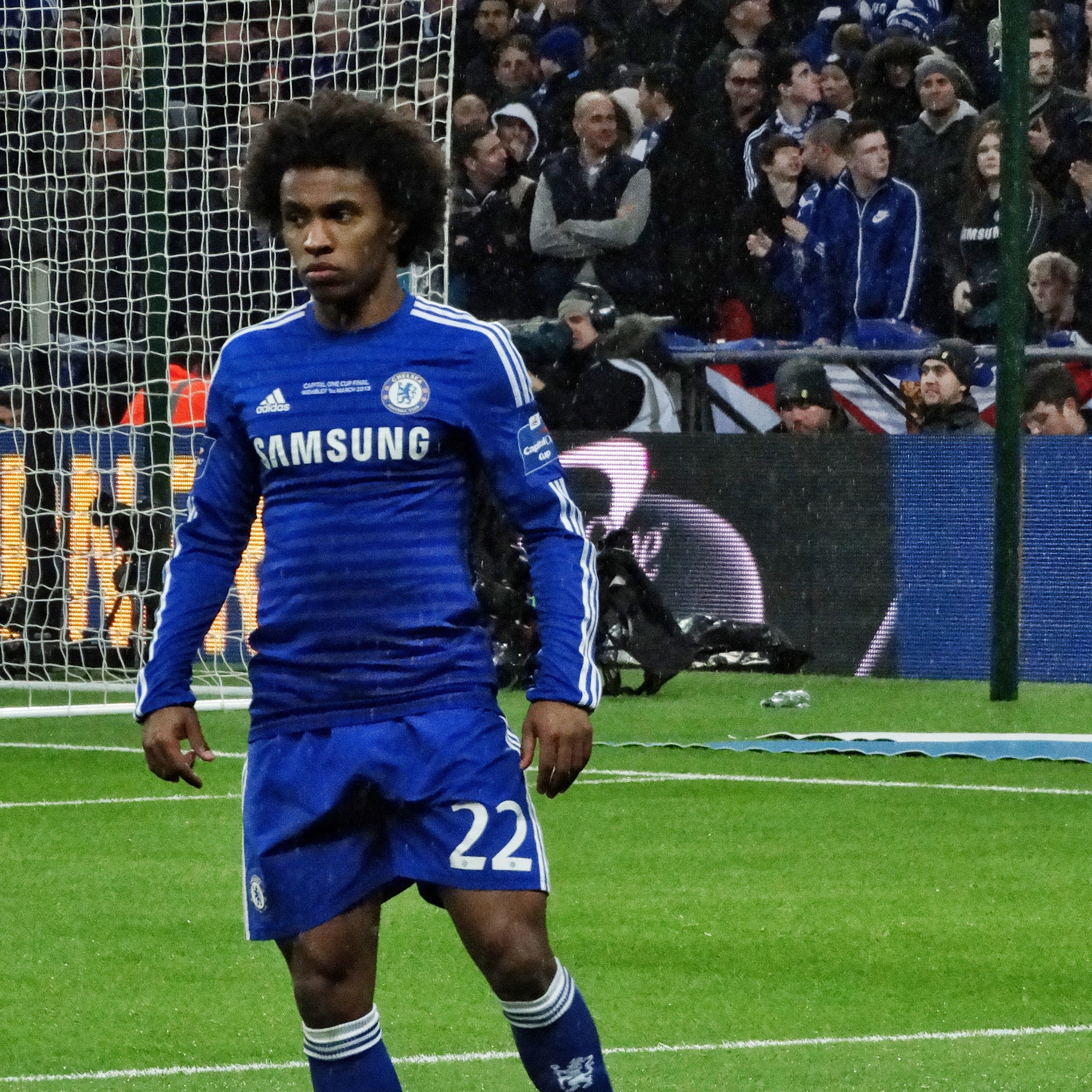
Willian playing for Chelsea in 2015

Willian scored his first goal of the new Premier League season in a 3–0 win over Aston Villa on 27 September. On 25 November, he scored his first Champions League goal for the club in a group stage match against Schalke 04 in Gelsenkirchen.

In extra time in a League Cup semi-final against Liverpool on 28 January 2015, he took the free-kick which was headed in by Branislav Ivanović to put Chelsea into the final. On 1 March, Willian was selected to start against Tottenham in the 2015 League Cup Final at Wembley Stadium, a match which Chelsea won 2–0 to win the trophy for the fifth time.

Willian ended the 2014–15 season having appeared in 36 of Chelsea's 38 league matches as the club won its fifth league title.

==== 2015–16 season ====
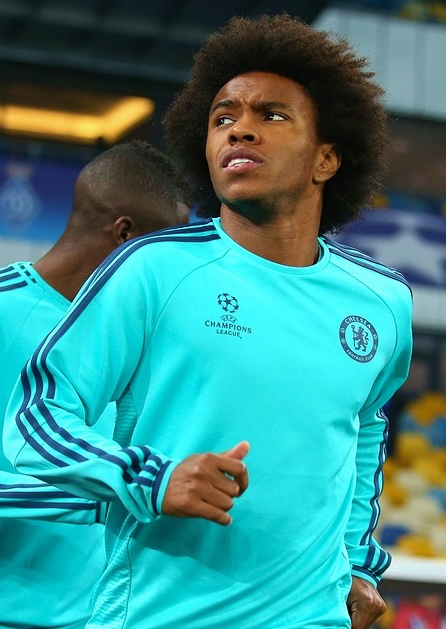
Willian for Chelsea in 2015–16

On 16 September, Willian scored directly from a free kick to open the scoring as Chelsea defeated Maccabi Tel Aviv in the club's first game of the Champions League group stage. He went on to score from free kicks in the team's next three matches; Premier League matches against Newcastle United and Southampton and a 2–1 loss at Porto in the Champions League. On 4 November, Willian scored his fifth free-kick of the season to give Chelsea a 2–1 win over Dynamo Kyiv, and 20 days later he recorded a sixth in a 4–0 triumph at Maccabi, making him Europe's top free-kick scorer of the season.

On 9 December, Willian scored his fifth Champions League goal of the season in a 2–0 victory over Porto in Chelsea's final group match, ensuring the team qualified for the knockout stage as group winners. He was subsequently named by UEFA as one of the top XI players of the Champions' League group stage.

On 13 May 2016, Willian was named Chelsea's Fans' Player of the Year and Players' Player of the Year for 2015–16.

==== 2016–17 season ====
On 12 July 2016, Willian signed a new four-year contract. On 27 August 2016, he scored his first goal of the season in a 3–0 win over newly promoted Burnley.

On 22 April 2017, Willian scored twice in Chelsea's 4–2 FA Cup semi-final victory over rivals Tottenham at Wembley Stadium.

==== 2017–18 season ====
On his 200th appearance for Chelsea, Willian scored twice and won two penalties as the Blues beat Qarabağ 4–0 at Baku National Stadium on 22 November. The win guaranteed the team progression into the knockout stages of the Champions League. In his next appearance, Willian came off the bench to score his first Premier League goal of the season, to rescue a point for Chelsea in a 1–1 draw against Liverpool at Anfield.

==== 2018–19 season ====
Willian scored his first goal of the season, coming off the bench to complete a 4–1 come-from-behind win at home to Cardiff City on 15 September. Prior to this, he had won a penalty that Eden Hazard converted for his hat trick. On 27 January, Willian, on his 550th club appearance, netted a brace in a 3–0 home win against Sheffield Wednesday in the fourth round of the FA Cup. The first goal was his 50th for Chelsea.

==== 2019–20 season ====
In August 2019, Willian became Chelsea's new number 10 for the 2019–20 season, taking over from Eden Hazard. He scored his first goal of the season in a 2–0 home league win over Brighton & Hove Albion on 28 September. In the next fixture, Willian scored the winning goal on his 300th Chelsea appearance, a 2–1 away win against Lille in the Champions League. He scored a brace to beat Tottenham 2–0 away from home on 22 December.

Willian scored twice in a 2–3 league defeat to West Ham United on 1 July 2020. In doing so, Willian became the first player to score a Premier League goal in every calendar month. He scored in his third consecutive game from the penalty spot in Chelsea's next league match, a 3–0 win over Watford; the goal meant Willian had scored nine league goals, his highest league total in a Chelsea shirt.

On 9 August, Willian released an open letter about his departure from the club on Twitter.

=== Arsenal ===
On 14 August 2020, Willian signed for Premier League club Arsenal on a three-year contract. On 12 September, Willian made his debut for the club against Fulham, recording two assists, as Arsenal won 3–0. On 28 February 2021, Willian registered an assist in a 3–1 win over Leicester City in the Premier League, which was his first goal contribution in the league for Arsenal since November 2020. On 9 May, Willian scored his only goal for Arsenal in a 3–1 home league win over West Bromwich Albion, sealing the Baggies' relegation to the EFL Championship.

Just after a year at the club, which Willian described as "the worst time that he had lived as a professional", and on 30 August 2021, Arsenal announced he had left the club by mutual consent and confirmed that Willian was set to re-join his boyhood club, Corinthians.

=== Return to Corinthians ===
On 30 August 2021, Corinthians announced the return of Willian to the club on a deal running until December 2023. He rescinded his contract in mid-August 2022 after complaining about virtual threats during his last months at the club.

=== Fulham ===
On 1 September 2022, Willian signed for Fulham on a one-year contract. On 23 October, Willian scored his first goal for Fulham, their third goal in a 3–2 away win at Leeds United. His second goal came on 12 January 2023, against his former club Chelsea, the first goal in Fulham's historic 2–1 win over their West London rivals, also meaning Fulham had won four top-flight games in a row for the first time since April 1966.

On 19 March 2023, in the FA Cup quarter-final against Manchester United, Willian received a red card for using his hand to block a shot from Jadon Sancho in the 70th minute, after a VAR check. During the VAR check, Fulham manager Marco Silva was given a red card for arguing with the referee. After referee Chris Kavanagh gave Willian a red card, Aleksandar Mitrović pushed Kavanagh, resulting in Mitrović receiving a red card as well. Despite leading 1–0 before the red cards, Fulham would ultimately be eliminated after a 3–1 defeat.

In July 2023, Fulham confirmed Willian had signed a new one-year deal with the club, keeping him at Craven Cottage through the 2023–24 Premier League season.

=== Olympiacos ===
On 2 September 2024, Willian signed a contract with Super League Greece club Olympiacos. On 30 December, his contract was terminated with mutual agreement.

=== Return to Fulham ===
On 6 February 2025, Willian rejoined Fulham on a short-term deal until the end of the 2024–25 season. Willian said he was "completely happy" to return to Fulham and said "I think we can do good things until the end of the season."

On 4 June 2025, Fulham announced that they would not be extending Willian's contract and he would leave the club at the end of the season.

== International career ==
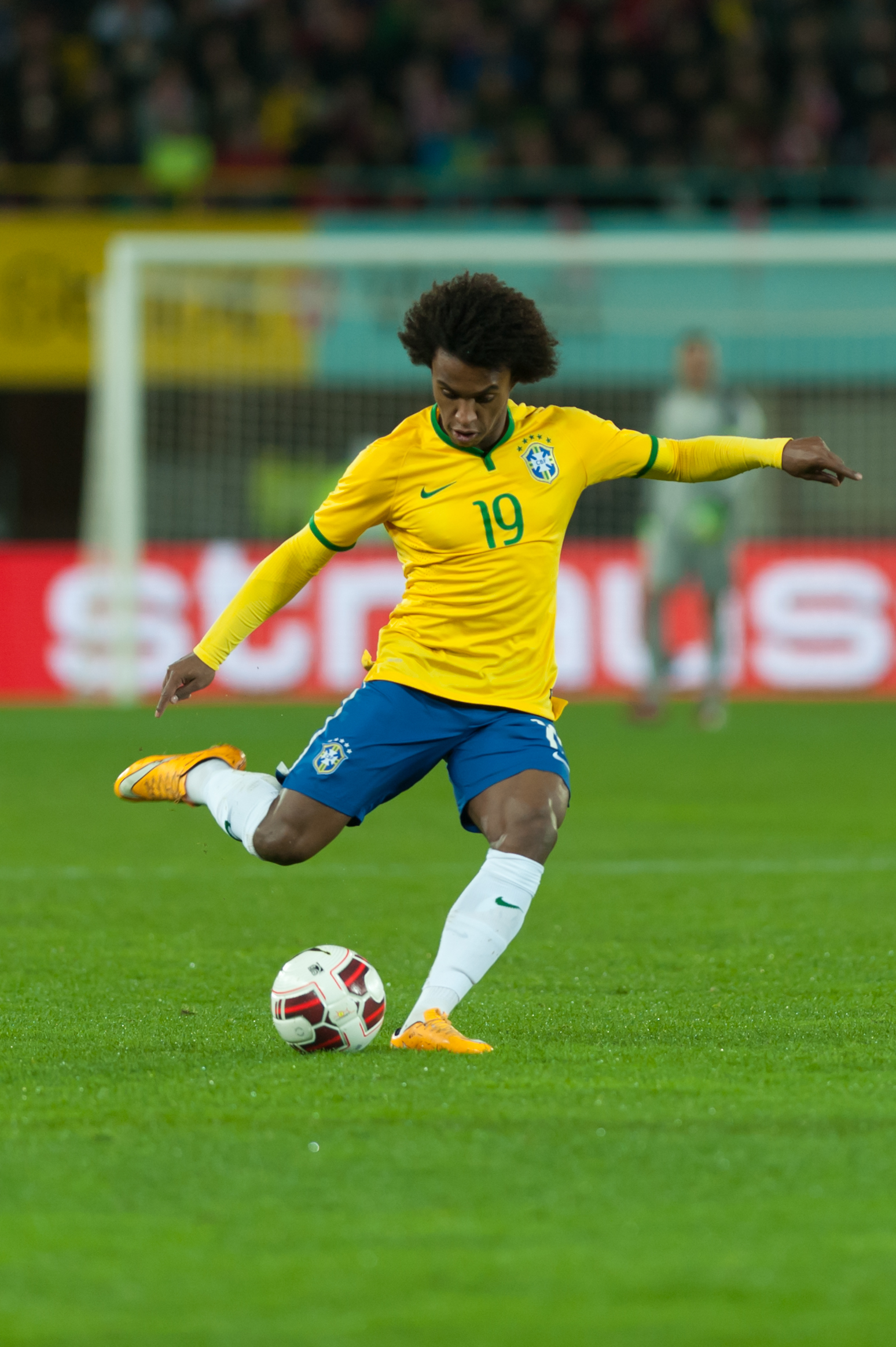
Willian in action for Brazil against Austria in 2014

As a member of the under-20 Brazil team, Willian made his debut in the 2007 South American Youth Championship against Chile on 7 January 2007, which Brazil went on to win. In 2007, he was also selected for the FIFA U-20 World Cup, but Brazil were eliminated in the quarterfinals by Spain.

On 10 November 2011, Willian made his senior debut for Brazil in a friendly match against Gabon. On 16 November 2013, he scored his first international goal in a 5–0 win over Honduras in Miami, Florida.

On 7 May 2014, Willian was selected as part of the 23-man squad for the 2014 FIFA World Cup. He came on at half-time in extra time of the round of 16 match against Chile in Belo Horizonte for his Chelsea teammate Oscar, and took a penalty in the shootout which he put wide of the goal, although Brazil nonetheless advanced.

At the 2015 Copa América, Willian assisted Roberto Firmino's decisive goal in the 2–1 win over Venezuela in Santiago, a result which sent Brazil into the quarterfinals as group winners.

On 5 May 2016, he was named by Brazil manager Dunga among the 23-man list for the Copa América Centenario to be held in the United States.

In May 2018, he was named in Tite's final 23-man squad for the 2018 FIFA World Cup in Russia.

On 7 June 2019, he received a late call-up for the 2019 Copa América to replace the injured Neymar.

== Style of play ==
A fast, agile, and technically gifted player, Willian is known for his quick feet, acceleration, and explosive style of play, which allow him to dribble past opponents at speed while keeping close control of the ball, a typical Brazilian style. He is also known for performing feints and tricks, such as the elástico, to confuse and beat defenders. He primarily plays as a winger, and his high stamina, vision, and creativity enable him to link up play between the deeper midfielders and the forwards, as well as create goalscoring chances. During the 2015–16 season, while at Chelsea, he demonstrated his prowess with direct free kicks, with almost all of his goals coming from set pieces. He improved his attacking statistics, which led to him being named Chelsea's top performer of the season.

== Personal life ==
Willian is married to Vanessa Martins. They have twin daughters, Valentina and Manuella. Like many Brazilian footballers, Willian is a devout Christian. Specifically, he is Evangelical.

In April 2016, Willian was named in the Panama Papers.

On 13 October 2016, Willian's mother, Dona Zezé, died at the age of 57. During the game against Premier League champions Leicester City, his teammates Diego Costa and Eden Hazard dedicated their goals to Willian and his mother. Chelsea manager, Antonio Conte, also dedicated the victory to Willian and his family.

In 2018, Willian and his teammate David Luiz acquired Babbo, an Italian restaurant located in Mayfair, London.

== Career statistics ==
=== Club ===
As of match played 17 July 2026

Appearances and goals by club, season and competition
Club	Season	League			National cup (Note: Includes Copa do Brasil, Ukrainian Cup, Russian Cup, FA Cup)		League cup (Note: Includes Football League/EFL Cup)		Continental		Other		Total	
Club	Season	Division	Apps	Goals	Apps	Goals	Apps	Goals	Apps	Goals	Apps	Goals	Apps	Goals
Corinthians	2006	Série A	5	0	0	0	—		0	0	3 (Note: Appearances in Campeonato Paulista)	0	8	0
Corinthians	2007	Série A	15	2	4	0	—		0	0	14	0	33	2
Corinthians	Total		20	2	4	0	—		0	0	17	0	41	2
Shakhtar Donetsk	2007–08	Vyshcha Liha	20	0	6	1	—		2 (Note: Appearances in UEFA Champions League)	0	—		28	1
Shakhtar Donetsk	2008–09	Ukrainian Premier League	29	5	5	1	—		17 (Note: Eight appearances and two goals in UEFA Champions League, nine appearances in UEFA Cup)	2	1 (Note: Appearance in Ukrainian Super Cup)	0	52	8
Shakhtar Donetsk	2009–10	Ukrainian Premier League	22	5	4	1	—		12 (Note: Two appearances in UEFA Champions League, ten appearances and one goal in UEFA Europa League)	1	1 (Note: Appearance in UEFA Super Cup)	0	39	7
Shakhtar Donetsk	2010–11	Ukrainian Premier League	28	3	4	2	—		10	2	1	1	43	8
Shakhtar Donetsk	2011–12	Ukrainian Premier League	27	5	3	0	—		6	1	1	0	37	6
Shakhtar Donetsk	2012–13	Ukrainian Premier League	14	2	2	1	—		6	4	0	0	22	7
Shakhtar Donetsk	Total		140	20	24	6	—		53	10	4	1	221	37
Anzhi Makhachkala	2012–13	Russian Premier League	7	1	3	0	—		3 (Note: Appearances in UEFA Europa League)	0	—		13	1
Anzhi Makhachkala	2013–14	Russian Premier League	4	0	0	0	—		0	0	—		4	0
Anzhi Makhachkala	Total		11	1	3	0	—		3	0	—		17	1
Chelsea	2013–14	Premier League	25	4	3	0	3	0	11	0	—		42	4
Chelsea	2014–15	Premier League	36	2	2	1	4	0	7	1	—		49	4
Chelsea	2015–16	Premier League	35	5	4	1	1	0	8	5	1 (Note: Appearance in FA Community Shield)	0	49	11
Chelsea	2016–17	Premier League	34	8	6	4	1	0	—		—		41	12
Chelsea	2017–18	Premier League	36	6	6	2	4	2	8	3	1	0	55	13
Chelsea	2018–19	Premier League	32	3	2	2	6	0	15	3	1	0	56	8
Chelsea	2019–20	Premier League	36	9	4	1	0	0	7	1	0	0	47	11
Chelsea	Total		234	37	27	11	19	2	56	13	3	0	339	63
Arsenal	2020–21	Premier League	25	1	2	0	1	0	9	0	0	0	37	1
Corinthians	2021	Série A	9	0	—		—		—		—		9	0
Corinthians	2022	Série A	14	0	2	0	—		8 (Note: Appearances in Copa Libertadores)	0	12	1	36	1
Corinthians	Total		23	0	2	0	0	0	8	0	12	1	45	1
Fulham	2022–23	Premier League	27	5	3	0	0	0	—		—		30	5
Fulham	2023–24	Premier League	31	4	2	0	4	1	—		—		37	5
Fulham	Total		58	9	5	0	4	1	—		—		67	10
Olympiacos	2024–25	Super League Greece	6	0	1	0	—		4	0	—		11	0
Fulham	2024–25	Premier League	10	0	2	0	—		—		—		12	0
Grêmio	2025	Série A	6	1	—		—		—		—		6	1
Grêmio	2026	Série A	9	0	1	1	—		2 (Note: Appearances in Copa Sudamericana)	0	10 (Note: Appearances in Campeonato Gaucho)	0	22	1
Grêmio	Total		15	1	1	1	—		2	0	10	0	28	2
Career total			542	71	71	18	24	3	135	23	46	2	818	117

=== International ===
As of match played 15 November 2019

Appearances and goals by national team and year
National team	Year	Apps	Goals
Brazil	2011	2	0
Brazil	2012	0	0
Brazil	2013	2	1
Brazil	2014	14	3
Brazil	2015	14	2
Brazil	2016	11	1
Brazil	2017	10	1
Brazil	2018	12	0
Brazil	2019	5	1
Total		70	9

As of match played 15 November 2019. Scores and results list Brazil's goal tally first, score column indicates score after each Willian goal.

List of international goals scored by Willian
No.	Date	Venue	Opponent	Score	Result	Competition
1	16 November 2013	Sun Life Stadium, Miami, United States	Honduras	4–0	5–0	Friendly
2	3 June 2014	Estádio Serra Dourada, Goiânia, Brazil	Panama	4–0	4–0	Friendly
3	9 September 2014	MetLife Stadium, East Rutherford, United States	Ecuador	1–0	1–0	Friendly
4	12 November 2014	Şükrü Saracoğlu Stadium, Istanbul, Turkey	Turkey	3–0	4–0	Friendly
5	13 October 2015	Estádio Castelão, Fortaleza, Brazil	Venezuela	1–0	3–1	2018 FIFA World Cup qualification
6	13 October 2015	Estádio Castelão, Fortaleza, Brazil	Venezuela	2–0	3–1	2018 FIFA World Cup qualification
7	11 October 2016	Estadio Metropolitano de Mérida, Mérida, Venezuela	Venezuela	2–0	2–0	2018 FIFA World Cup qualification
8	5 September 2017	Estadio Metropolitano Roberto Meléndez, Barranquilla, Colombia	Colombia	1–0	1–1	2018 FIFA World Cup qualification
9	22 June 2019	Arena Corinthians, São Paulo, Brazil	Peru	5–0	5–0	2019 Copa América

== Honours ==
Shakhtar Donetsk

- Ukrainian Premier League: 2007–08, 2009–10, 2010–11, 2011–12, 2012–13
- Ukrainian Cup: 2007–08, 2010–11, 2011–12, 2012–13
- Ukrainian Super Cup: 2008, 2010
- UEFA Cup: 2008–09

Chelsea

- Premier League: 2014–15, 2016–17
- FA Cup: 2017–18; runner-up: 2016–17
- Football League/EFL Cup: 2014–15; runner-up: 2018–19
- UEFA Europa League: 2018–19

Grêmio

- Campeonato Gaúcho: 2026

Brazil

- Copa América: 2019

Individual

- Ukrainian Premier League Best Player: 2010–11
- UEFA Champions League Team of the Group stage: 2015–16
- Chelsea Player of the Year: 2016
- Chelsea Players' Player of the Year: 2016, 2018
- Premier League Goal of the Month: January 2018, February 2023
- Chelsea Goal of the Season: 2018
- UEFA Europa League top assist provider: 2018–19
