= Union Bank F.C. =

Nigerian football club

Union Bank FC
- Full name: Union Bank Football Club
- Nickname: The Stallion Boys
- Ground: Onikan Stadium, Lagos; Union Bank Sports Complex, Surulere
- Capacity: 5,000/NA
- Chairman: Emmanuel Ogunwole
- League: Metro Pro League (Lagos)
Home colours

Union Bank FC was a Nigerian association football club based in Lagos and owned by Union Bank of Nigeria which also operated a number of other sports teams.

The club played in the first decade of the 21st century for a couple of seasons in the second tier of Nigerian football, the National Division 1. At last they were relegated to the third tier Nigeria Amateur League after the 2008–09 season.

The Union Bank FC won again promotion in 2013 but sold their second division spot to the resurrected Stationery Stores FC. Instead the club joined the Metro Pro League, a new privately run professional football league in Lagos. In June 2014 the club secured itself the one and only championship of this league, ahead of Bridge FC, formerly known as Julius Berger. Both, the league and Union Bank FC were apparently disbanded after that.

The Nigerian internationals Ayila Yussuf and Bernard Okorowanta commenced their careers in the early 2000s with the club.
