= Weifang Cup =

Football tournament

The Weifang Cup (Chinese: 潍坊杯) is a football tournament which traditionally features invited national and club teams composed of under-20 players although the first tournament in 2006 included under-13 and under-15 teams as well. The tournament is held by the China Football Association and Shandong Luneng Taishan F.C. every summer in the city of Weifang, China.

In 2012 this tournament expanded to 12 teams.

== Winners ==
Year		Winner	score	Runners-up
2006	U-15	Shandong Luneng (China)	RR	(Germany) Bayern Munich
2006	U-13	Shandong Luneng (China)	4–0	(China) Beijing Team
2007		Australia	RR	China
2008		not held		
2009		Espanyol (Spain)	1–0	China
2010		China	3–1	(China) Tianjin Teda
2011		Guadalajara (Mexico)	3–1	China
2012		Villarreal (Spain)	1–0	North Korea
2013		São Paulo (Brazil)	4–0	(China) Shandong Luneng
2014		River Plate (Argentina)	1–0	(China) Shandong Luneng
2015	Men	Wolfsburg (Germany)	1–0	(Mexico) Guadalajara
2015	Women	China	RR	Uzbekistan
2016	Men	Desportivo Brasil (Brazil)	4–1	China
2016	Women	China	RR	Japan
2017	Men	Wolfsburg (Germany)	4–0	(Brazil) Desportivo Brasil
2017	Women	China	RR	United States
2018	Men	Boca Juniors (Argentina)	3–0	(China) Shandong Luneng
2018	Women	United States	RR	Japan
2019	Men	Boca Juniors (Argentina)	2–0	(Brazil) Santos
2019	Women	China	RR	New Zealand
2020		Not held due to the COVID-19 pandemic		
2021		Not held due to the COVID-19 pandemic		
