= Kyrylo Sydorenko =

Ukrainian footballer

Personal information
- Full name: Kyrylo Volodymyrovych Sydorenko
- Date of birth: 25 July 1985 (age 41)
- Place of birth: Dnipropetrovsk, Ukrainian SSR
- Height: 1.83 m (6 ft 0 in)
- Position: Defender

Youth career
- 1998–2000: Dnipro-75 Dnipropetrovsk
- 2001–2002: Dnipro Dnipropetrovsk

Senior career*
Years	Team	Apps	(Gls)
2002–2005	Dnipro Dnipropetrovsk	0	(0)
2002	→ Dnipro-3 Dnipropetrovsk	2	(0)
2003–2004	→ Dnipro-2 Dnipropetrovsk	18	(0)
2005–2009	Tiraspol	102	(11)
2009	→ Dinamo Minsk (loan)	1	(0)
2010–2012	Oleksandriya	61	(14)
2012	Obolon Kyiv	11	(1)
2013	Arsenal Kyiv	7	(0)
2013–2014	Oleksandriya	17	(0)
2014–2015	Tiraspol	18	(1)
2015–2016	Illichivets Mariupol	45	(3)
2017	Helios Kharkiv	4	(0)
2018	Desna Chernihiv	5	(0)
2019–2020	VPK-Ahro Shevchenkivka	20	(3)
Total		311	(33)

Managerial career
- 2021: VPK-Ahro Shevchenkivka (assistant)
- * Club domestic league appearances and goals as of 6 February 2021

Kyrylo Sydorenko (Ukrainian: Кирило Володимирович Сидоренко; born 25 July 1985) is a Ukrainian retired football defender who played for VPK-Ahro Shevchenkivka.

== Club statistics ==
- Total matches played in Moldavian First League: 20 matches - 2 goals
