= Serhiy Sibiryakov =

Ukrainian footballer

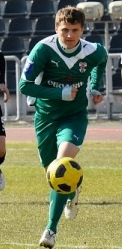
- Serhiy Sibiryakov (2011)

Personal information
- Full name: Serhiy Oleksandrovych Sibiryakov
- Date of birth: 1 January 1982 (age 44)
- Place of birth: Stryi, Lviv Oblast, Ukrainian SSR, Soviet Union
- Height: 1.80 m (5 ft 11 in)
- Position: Midfielder

Senior career*
Years	Team	Apps	(Gls)
2000	Tsementnyk-Khorda Mykolaiv	24	(1)
2001–2002	Dnipro Dnipropetrovsk	2	(0)
2001–2002	→ Dnipro-2 Dnipropetrovsk	44	(6)
2001–2002	→ Dnipro-3 Dnipropetrovsk	19	(1)
2003	Oleksandriya	3	(0)
2003	Zorya Luhansk	17	(1)
2004	Metalist Kharkiv	12	(0)
2004	→ Metalist-2 Kharkiv	3	(0)
2004	Arsenal Kharkiv	14	(3)
2005–2006	Tavriya Simferopol	22	(0)
2007–2012	Obolon Kyiv	130	(6)
2013	Bukovyna Chernivtsi	14	(1)
2014	Tytan Armiansk	9	(0)
2015	TSK Simferopol		
- * Club domestic league appearances and goals

Serhiy Sibiryakov (Ukrainian: Сергій Сібіряков); Sergey Sibiryakov (Russian: Сергей Сибиряков; born 1 January 1982) is a Ukrainian former footballer who played as a midfielder.

In February 2015, he became a player for TSK Simferopol, which acts in the Crimea championship.
