= Jan Králík =

Czech footballer

Personal information
- Date of birth: 7 March 1987 (age 39)
- Place of birth: Ústí nad Labem, Czechoslovakia
- Height: 1.81 m (5 ft 11 in)
- Position: Attacking midfielder

Senior career*
Years	Team	Apps	(Gls)
2004–2007	Viktoria Žižkov		
2007	→ Rimavská Sobota (loan)		
2008	Ružomberok	1	(0)
2008–2011	Slovan Bratislava	10	(0)
2011–2013	Oleksandriya	15	(1)
2013	Viktoria Žižkov	2	(0)
2014–2016	Ústí nad Labem	49	(4)
2016–2017	Bayern Hof	17	(2)
- * Club domestic league appearances and goals as of 31 December 2014

Jan Králík (born 7 March 1987 in Ústí nad Labem) is a Czech footballer who currently plays for Ústí nad Labem.
