= Sebastián Setti =

Argentine footballer

Seba Setti
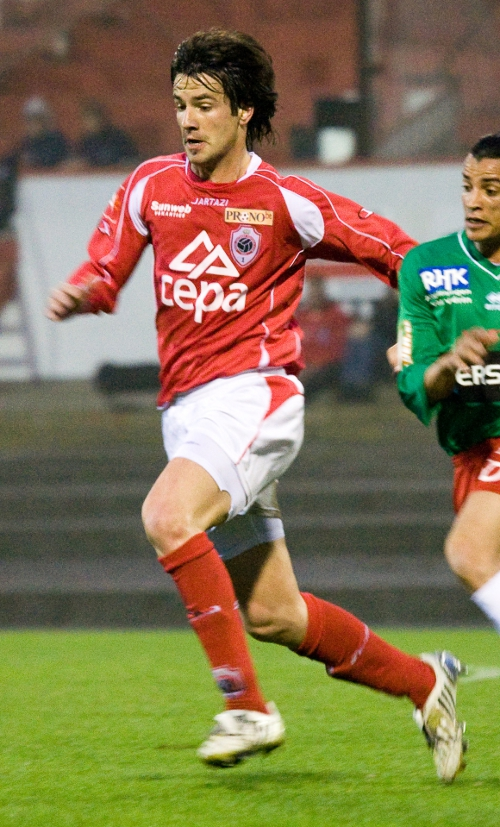

Personal information
- Full name: Sebastián Andrés Setti Wasilewski
- Date of birth: 9 February 1984 (age 42)
- Place of birth: Caseros, Buenos Aires, Argentina
- Height: 1.86 m (6 ft 1 in)
- Position: Midfielder

Team information
- Current team: Deinze (assistant coach)

Senior career*
Years	Team	Apps	(Gls)
2004–2007	Argentinos Juniors	13	(0)
2006–2007	→ Almagro (loan)	20	(1)
2007–2008	Guaraní	33	(0)
2008–2010	Royal Antwerp	52	(6)
2010	Changchun Yatai	22	(1)
2011–2012	Chornomorets Odesa	32	(0)
2012	Apollon Limassol	13	(1)
2013–2014	Asteras Tripoli	22	(1)
2014	Apollon Smyrni	5	(0)
2015–2016	Panthrakikos	9	(0)
2016	Atlético San Luis	11	(0)
2016–2017	Llagostera	3	(0)
2017	Figueres	?	(?)
2017–2019	Amorebieta	11	(0)

Managerial career
- 2018–2021: CD Laudio
- 2023: CF Montréal (assistant)
- 2024–: Deinze (assistant)
- * Club domestic league appearances and goals as of 24 November 2017

Sebastián "Seba" Andrés Setti Wasilewski (Spanish pronunciation: [seβasˈtjan ˈseβa anˈdɾes ˈseti]; born 9 February 1984) is an Argentine football manager and former professional player. he is the currently assistant coach of Challenger Pro League club Deinze.

== Club career ==
Setti used to play for Argentinos Juniors, Almagro in Argentina and Guaraní in Paraguay. He transferred to Royal Antwerp in 2008. On 14 August 2008, he scored his first goal for the club against K.A.S. Eupen. Manager Player Garzia Marcos (Garziafutbol) Agente players

Setti moved to China and signed a contract with Changchun Yatai in March 2010. He made his CSL debut for Changchun against Liaoning F.C. on 27 March.

On 13 January 2011, Setti signed a 2.5-year contract with Chornomorets Odesa. At this club, he got promoted to the Ukrainian football Premier League, being team's vice-captain.
