= Stockland Wetherill Park =

Shopping mall in Wetherill Park and Prairiewood, Sydney, Australia

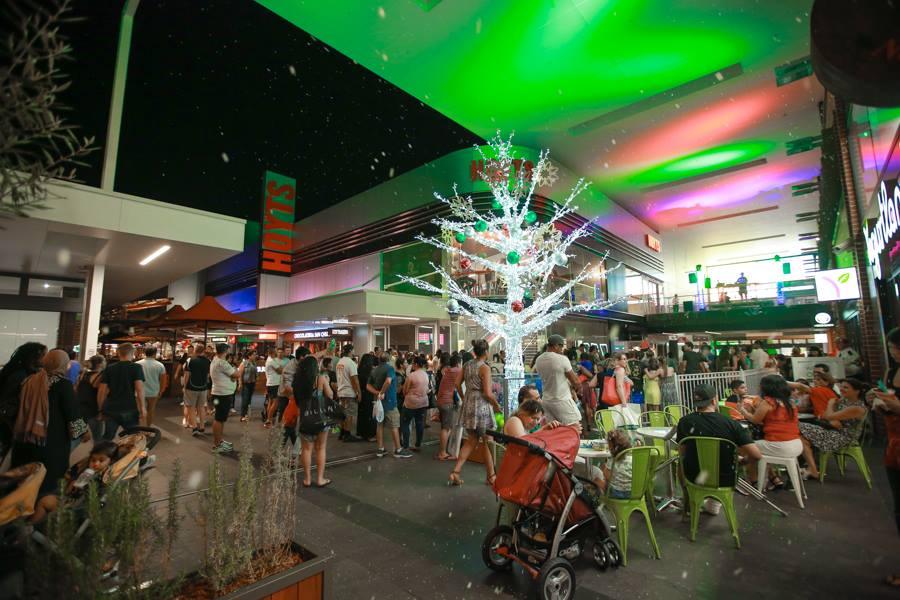
- Outdoor plaza
- Location: Wetherill Park and Prairiewood
- Coordinates: 33°51′32″S 150°53′56″E
- Opened: 1983; 43 years ago
- Developer: Stockland
- Num. of stores: 200+
- Num. of anchor tenants: 5
- Floor area: 71,356 m^{2} (768,070 sq ft)
- Floors: 2
- Parking: 2,637
- Public transit: Prairiewood
- Website: Stockland Wetherill Park

Stockland Wetherill Park (known as “Stockies” to locals) is a shopping mall in Wetherill Park, Sydney, Australia. Being an indoor and outdoor shopping centre, it is 47th-largest by area in the country. Costing $142 million to build, the centre was established in 1983 and has been through four phases of redevelopment, with the major one completed in September 2016, where it had undergone a $228 million renovation with some 5,600 m^{2} (60,000 sq ft) of retail space.

== Features ==
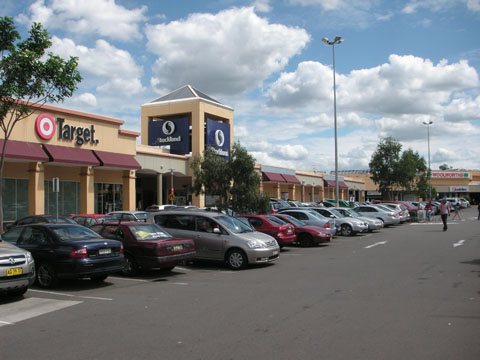
Stockland Mall before the major redevelopment (2010)

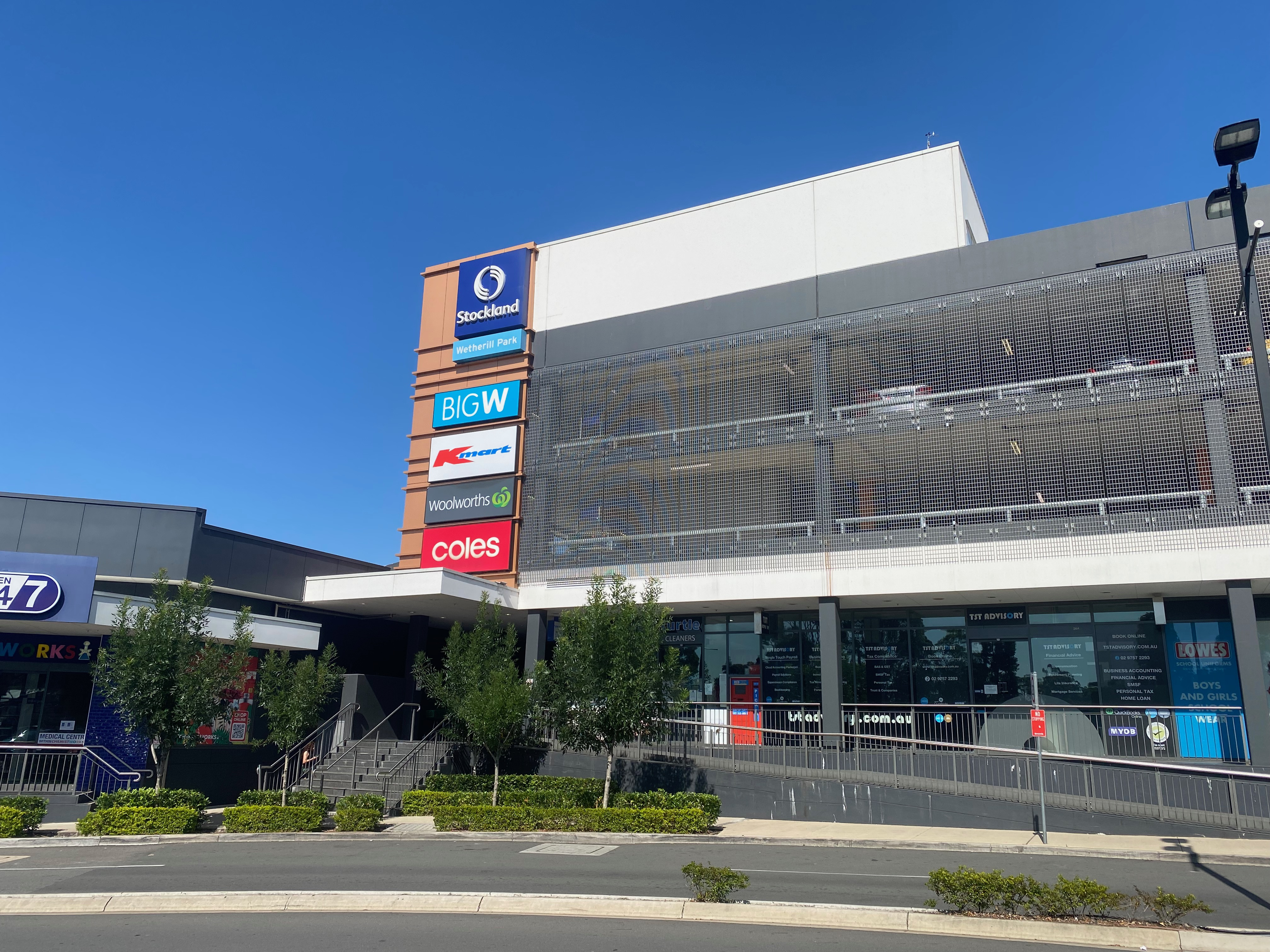
The entrance to the mall (2022)

The shopping centre features Coles, Woolworths, Big W, Kmart, JB Hi-Fi, Angus & Coote and 200 specialty stores, including over 20 fashion stores. It also features a refurbished, twelve-screen Hoyts cinema with leather seating and recliners, a 24-hour gym and alfresco dining with floor-to-ceiling windows. The centre features "The Grove", which contains an 800-seat indoor-outdoor food terrace with 14 restaurants, cafes and food operators, with those outside being in a lane-way setting. Cuisines in the eateries include Thai, Mexican, Vietnamese and Italian, among others.

The centre has also opened an extra 910 car parking spaces in 2016, bringing the total to close to 2700 spaces, which is a 30% increase on the number of spaces available before the redevelopment. The mall's height is roughly around 15 metres. Furthermore, the shopping centre also includes a children's playground, which is on the outdoor section of the mall.

Chris Bowen MP, Member for McMahon, Shadow Treasurer, Dr Hugh McDermott MP, Member for Prospect and Mayor of Fairfield City Council, Frank Carbone attended the official re-opening and toured the centre. Since opening stage 1 in 2015, Stockland Wetherill Park has received more than 5 million people through the new subdivisions of the mall.

== Access ==
The Liverpool–Parramatta T-way has a station at the complex, and there are a number of bus stops belonging to Transit Systems that operate nearby. A taxi zone is located on Polding Street which are both within the realm of the shopping mall.

== See also ==
- Fairfield Showground, nearby marketplace
