= Ayila Yussuf =

Nigerian footballer (born 1984)

Ayila Yussuf Atanda
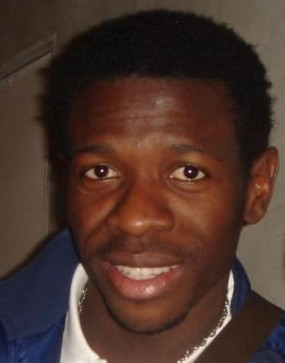

Personal information
- Full name: Atanda Ayila Yussuf
- Date of birth: 4 November 1984 (age 41)
- Place of birth: Lagos, Nigeria
- Height: 1.84 m (6 ft 0 in)
- Position: Defensive midfielder

Youth career
- 2002–2003: Julius Berger
- Enyimba
- Union Bank

Senior career*
Years	Team	Apps	(Gls)
2002–2003	Union Bank	43	(4)
2003–2014	Dynamo Kyiv	120	(10)
2003	→ Dynamo-2 Kyiv	10	(0)
2013	→ Orduspor (loan)	8	(1)
2013	→ Dynamo-2 Kyiv	8	(2)
2014	→ Metalist Kharkiv (loan)	11	(2)
Total		194	(18)

International career
2005–2011	Nigeria	31	(1)
- * Club domestic league appearances and goals

Atanda Ayila Yussuf (born 4 November 1984) is a Nigerian former professional footballer who played as a central defender or defensive midfielder. A former Nigerian youth international player, he moved to Ukrainian Premier League Dynamo Kyiv from Nigerian side Union Bank in 2003. Despite injuries, Yussuf became a regular for both Dynamo Kyiv and the Nigeria national team. He joined Metalist Kharkiv on loan in 2014.

== Club career ==
=== Early career ===
At 16 years of age, Yussuf signed his first professional contract with Enyimba International he then continued his career with Union Bank his selection in senior teams drew the attention of the youth national team coaches.

=== Dynamo Kyiv ===
After drawing interest from clubs like PSV Eindhoven and VfB Stuttgart, Yussuf signed with Dynamo Kyiv in July 2003. On 5 August, he made his debut in the club's reserve team, Dynamo-2 Kyiv, against Polissya Zhytomyr. Less than two months later, on 21 September, Yussef made his senior team debut against Zirka Kirovohrad. A serious knee injury ended his 2003–04 season. On 16 September 2004, he made his first appearance in the UEFA Champions League for Dynamo Kyiv in a match against Roma.

Since the second half of the 2011–12 season, Yussuf has struggled to maintain a place in the first team and was loaned to Süper Lig side Orduspor on 31 January 2013. After a loan spell in Turkey, he still had not regained a first-team spot and played for the reserve team of Dynamo Kyiv, Dynamo-2 Kyiv. On 18 February 2014, he joined league rivals Metalist Kharkiv on a loan deal until the end of the year.

== Career statistics ==
As of 2 January 2014

Appearances and goals by club, season and competition
Club	Season	League			Cup		Continental		Total	
Club	Season	Division	Apps	Goals	Apps	Goals	Apps	Goals	Apps	Goals
Dynamo-2 Kyiv	2003–04	Ukrainian First League	10	0	–		0	0	10	0
Dynamo Kyiv	2003–04	Ukrainian; Premier League	1	0	–		0	0	1	0
Dynamo Kyiv	2004–05	Ukrainian; Premier League	16	3	1	0	7	1	24	4
Dynamo Kyiv	2005–06	Ukrainian; Premier League	14	3	1	0	2	0	17	3
Dynamo Kyiv	2006–07	Ukrainian; Premier League	21	2	1	0	9	1	31	3
Dynamo Kyiv	2007–08	Ukrainian; Premier League	15	1	1	0	3	0	18	1
Dynamo Kyiv	2008–09	Ukrainian; Premier League	11	0	0	0	7	0	18	0
Dynamo Kyiv	2009–10	Ukrainian; Premier League	16	1	2	0	4	1	22	2
Dynamo Kyiv	2010–11	Ukrainian; Premier League	13	0	4	1	8	1	25	2
Dynamo Kyiv	2011–12	Ukrainian; Premier League	11	0	1	0	7	0	19	0
Dynamo Kyiv	2012–13	Ukrainian; Premier League	2	0	0	0	0	0	2	0
Dynamo Kyiv	Total		120	10	11	1	47	4	178	15
Orduspor (loan)	2012–13	Süper Lig	8	1	–		–		8	1
Dynamo-2 Kyiv	2013–14	Ukrainian First League	8	2	–		–		8	2
Career total			146	13	11	1	47	4	204	18
