= Anton Shevchuk =

Ukrainian footballer

Personal information
- Full name: Anton Yuriyovych Shevchuk
- Date of birth: 8 February 1990 (age 36)
- Place of birth: Uman, Cherkasy Oblast, Ukrainian SSR
- Height: 1.78 m (5 ft 10 in)
- Position: Midfielder

Youth career
- 2006–2007: FC Illichivets-Uman Uman

Senior career*
Years	Team	Apps	(Gls)
2009	FC Khodak Cherkasy	6	(2)
2010–2013	FC Obolon Kyiv	24	(0)
2012–2013	→ FC Obolon-2 Kyiv	13	(1)
2013–2014	FC Poltava	52	(2)
2015–2017	FC Obolon Kyiv	76	(8)
2018	FC Krymteplytsia Molodizhne	14	(1)
2018–2020	FC Kyzyltash Bakhchisaray	50	(13)
2021	FC Gvardeyets Skvortsovo		

International career
2010	Ukraine U20	1	(0)
2011–2012	Ukraine U21	8	(1)
- * Club domestic league appearances and goals

Anton Shevchuk (Ukrainian: Антон Юрійович Шевчук; born 8 February 1990) is a Ukrainian former professional football midfielder.

== Career ==
Shevchuk is product of youth team systems of Uman city. Made his debut for FC Obolon Kyiv entering as a substituted player in game against FC Metalurh Donetsk on 9 May 2010 in Ukrainian Premier League.

On 11 November 2011 he made his debut for the Ukraine national under-21 football team in a match against the Finland national under-21 football team.
