= Bernard Okorowanta =

Nigerian footballer

Personal information
- Full name: Bernard Okorowanta
- Date of birth: 11 December 1986 (age 39)
- Place of birth: Lagos, Nigeria
- Height: 1.77 m (5 ft 10 in)
- Position: Midfielder

Team information
- Current team: Warri Wolves F.C.

Senior career*
Years	Team	Apps	(Gls)
–2004	Union Bank F.C.		
2004–2005	Maccabi Tel Aviv F.C.		
2005–2007	Sivasspor	0	(0)
2007–2008	Hakoah Amidar Ramat Gan F.C.		
2008–2014	Bayelsa United F.C.		
2014–2015	Enyimba FC		
2016–	Warri Wolves F.C.		

International career
2008	Nigeria U-23	14	(1)
- * Club domestic league appearances and goals

Bernard Okorowanta (born 11 December 1986) is a Nigerian midfielder who plays for Warri Wolves F.C.

== Career ==
He started his career with Union Bank F.C. then moved to top Israeli side Maccabi Tel Aviv.

== Personal life ==
Bernard is the younger brother of ex-international, Tarila Okorowanta. He derives inspiration from the person who bought him his first boots.
