= 2013–14 in Ukrainian football =

Football in Ukraine
- Season: 2013–14

Men's football
- Premier League: Shakhtar Donetsk
- League 1: Olimpik Donetsk
- League 2: Hirnyk-Sport Komsomolsk
- Amateur League: Rukh Vynnyky (2014); ODEK Orzhiv (2013)
- Cup: Dynamo Kyiv
- Amateur Cup: AF Piatykhatska (2014); Chaika P. Borshchahivka (2013)
- Super Cup: Shakhtar Donetsk

Women's football
- League High: Zhytlobud-1 Kharkiv (2014); Zhytlobud-1 Kharkiv (2013)
- League 1: Nika Poltava (2014); Medyk Morshyn (2013)
- Women's Cup: Zhytlobud-1 Kharkiv (2014); Zhytlobud-1 Kharkiv (2013)

The 2013–14 season was the 23rd season of competitive association football in Ukraine since dissolution of the Soviet Union.

== Men's club football ==
League	Promoted to league	Relegated from league
Premier League	FC Sevastopol	~~Kryvbas Kryvyi Rih~~
League One	Desna Chernihiv; Nyva Ternopil; UkrAhroKom Holovkivka	Arsenal Bila Tserkva; Obolon Kyiv; ~~Krymteplytsia Molodizhne~~; ~~FC Odesa~~
League Two	Enerhiya Mykolaiv; Obolon-Brovar Kyiv	~~Yednist Plysky~~; ~~Obolon-2 Kyiv~~; ~~SKA Odesa~~; ~~Zhemchuzhyna Yalta~~; ~~FC Sevastopol-2~~

Note: For all scratched clubs, see section Clubs removed for more details

=== Premier League ===
Pos	Team	Pld	W	D	L	GF	GA	GD	Pts	Qualification or relegation
1	Shakhtar Donetsk (C)	28	21	2	5	62	23	+39	65	Qualification for the Champions League group stage
2	Dnipro Dnipropetrovsk	28	18	5	5	56	28	+28	59	Qualification for the Champions League third qualifying round (Note: On 18 June 2014 UEFA published seeding ranking for the upcoming 2014-15 UEFA Champions League season where FC Dnipro Dnipropetrovsk were pending approval of the UEFA Club Financial Control Body (CFCB) on 19 June 2014 to participate in the competition. The main issue that might have impeded Dnipro to participate in the continental competitions was the "Boateng case". The conflict arose during the 2012-13 season when Derek Boateng unsuccessfully tried to leave the club due to breach of contract and was forced to file a case against the club through the Court of Arbitration for Sport (CAS) in Lausanne. The end result was that Dnipro did play in the 2014-15 Champions League 3rd qualifying round (and, subsequently, the Europa League).)
3	Metalist Kharkiv	28	16	9	3	54	29	+25	57	Qualification for the Europa League play-off round
4	Dynamo Kyiv	28	16	5	7	55	33	+22	53	Qualification for the Europa League group stage (Note: FC Dynamo Kyiv qualified for the Group Stage of the 2014-15 Europa League as the 2013-14 Ukrainian Cup winner.)
5	Chornomorets Odesa	28	12	10	6	30	22	+8	46	Qualification for the Europa League third qualifying round
6	Metalurh Donetsk	28	12	7	9	45	42	+3	43	
7	Zorya Luhansk	28	11	9	8	35	30	+5	42	Qualification for the Europa League second qualifying round
8	Vorskla Poltava	28	10	10	8	36	38	−2	40	
9	Sevastopol (D)	28	10	5	13	32	43	−11	35	Club expelled after season (Note: After the annexation of Crimea by Russia, FC Sevastopol and SC Tavriya Simferopol were officially disbanded and in their place were created new clubs that aimed to participate in the Russian competitions next season.)
10	Illichivets Mariupol	28	10	4	14	27	33	−6	34	
11	Karpaty Lviv	28	7	11	10	33	39	−6	32	
12	Hoverla Uzhhorod	28	7	5	16	26	39	−13	26	
13	Volyn Lutsk	28	7	6	15	25	51	−26	24 (Note: On 20 May 2014, FC Volyn Lutsk were deducted three points by the FFU for breach of financial rules.)	
14	Metalurh Zaporizhzhia	28	2	6	20	19	54	−35	12	
15	Tavriya Simferopol (D)	28	2	4	22	15	46	−31	10	Club expelled after season
16	Arsenal Kyiv (D)	0	0	0	0	0	0	0	0	Club officially expelled from the league (Note: On 29 October 2013, the general director of FC Arsenal Kyiv Viktor Holovko announced that the club was filing for bankruptcy and withdrawing from competitions as it was unable to find any sponsors. The General Assembly of the Ukrainian Premier League was unable to reach a quorum and hence no decision was made on the expulsion of the club from the UPL. (18 December 2013) On 12 February 2014 Arsenal Kyiv was officially expelled from the league and all the club's results were annulled. Arsenal played 13 games with record 3 wins, 1 draw and 9 losses with 10 goals scored and 28 goals scored against and also one technical defeat was recorded against them.)

Source: uafootball.net.ua
Rules for classification: 1st points; 2nd goal difference; 3rd goals scored; 4th head-to-head points; 5th head-to-head goal difference; 6th head-to-head goals scored; 7th fair play rating
(C) Champions; (D) Disqualified

=== League 1 ===
Pos	Team	Pld	W	D	L	GF	GA	GD	Pts	Promotion or relegation
1	Olimpik Donetsk (C, P)	30	16	7	7	45	33	+12	55	Promoted to Ukrainian Premier League
2	PFC Oleksandriya	30	14	10	6	47	28	+19	52	Refused promotion (Note: PFC Oleksandriya were to be promoted after finishing second but the president of the club refused promotion citing instability in the country and business reasons with the cost of keeping a team in the Premier League.)
3	Stal Alchevsk	30	16	3	11	41	33	+8	51	
4	FC Poltava	30	14	4	12	36	34	+2	46	
5	Desna Chernihiv	30	14	2	14	33	27	+6	44	
6	Zirka Kirovohrad	30	12	8	10	36	34	+2	44	
7	Naftovyk-Ukrnafta Okhtyrka	30	12	7	11	40	35	+5	43	
8	UkrAhroKom Holovkivka (D)	30	11	9	10	27	27	0	42	Merged after season
9	Helios Kharkiv	30	10	11	9	29	35	−6	41	
10	Nyva Ternopil	30	10	9	11	33	32	+1	39	
11	FC Sumy	30	11	6	13	29	39	−10	39	
12	Tytan Armyansk (D)	30	10	8	12	32	41	−9	38	Withdrew after season (Note: FC Tytan Armyansk completed the season but the team was dissolved due to the annexation of Crimea by the Russian Federation.)
13	Bukovyna Chernivtsi	30	10	6	14	26	36	−10	36	
14	Dynamo-2 Kyiv	30	8	8	14	29	30	−1	32	
15	Avanhard Kramatorsk (D)	30	7	10	13	23	27	−4	31	Suspended after season (Note: FC Avanhard Kramatorsk completed the season but the team's participation in competitions was suspended due to the situation in the East Ukraine.)
16	MFC Mykolaiv	30	9	4	17	34	49	−15	31	Avoided relegation (Note: Relegation to the Ukrainian Second League for the next season was canceled. The Central Council of Professional Football League of Ukraine considered the force majeure circumstances that were created due to war conditions in Kramatorsk as the reason for the cancellation. With the goal to preserve the maximum integrity of the League, considering that a direct threat to the life of footballers, coaching staff, and club's administration, those games, that were to be conducted with participation of Avanhard Kramatorsk to the end of the season, were recognized that they were not going to take place because of those unforeseen events. (21 May 2014))

Source: Professional Football League of Ukraine
Rules for classification: 1st points; 2nd goal difference; 3rd goals scored; 4th head-to-head points;
5th head-to-head goal difference; 6th head-to-head goals scored; 7th head-to-head fair play (all games); 8th draw or playoff
(C) Champions; (D) Disqualified; (P) Promoted

=== League 2 ===
Pos	Team	Pld	W	D	L	GF	GA	GD	Pts	Promotion or relegation
1	Hirnyk-Sport Komsomolsk (C, P)	36	25	4	7	68	31	+37	79	Promoted to Ukrainian First League
2	Stal Dniprodzerzhynsk (P)	36	23	8	5	81	32	+49	77	Promoted to Ukrainian First League
3	FC Ternopil (P)	36	20	11	5	56	27	+29	71	Promoted to Ukrainian First League
4	Hirnyk Kryvyi Rih (P)	36	20	10	6	49	36	+13	70	Promoted to Ukrainian First League
5	Shakhtar Sverdlovsk	36	19	10	7	48	29	+19	67	Suspended (Note: Shakhtar Sverdlovsk completed the season but was suspended from the PFL after the season due to instability in their region.)
6	Slavutych Cherkasy	36	20	5	11	49	33	+16	65	
7	Kremin Kremenchuk	36	19	7	10	54	28	+26	64	
8	Obolon-Brovar Kyiv	36	16	12	8	51	34	+17	60	
9	Krystal Kherson	36	15	8	13	51	48	+3	53	
10	Shakhtar-3 Donetsk	36	17	2	17	50	50	0	53	
11	Real Pharma Ovidiopol	36	14	5	17	30	57	−27	47	
12	FC Karlivka	36	13	5	18	31	48	−17	44	Withdrew (Note: FC Karlivka completed the season but failed to submit a license for the next.)
13	Makiyivvuhillya Makiyivka	36	12	6	18	33	50	−17	42	
14	Myr Hornostayivka	36	11	4	21	32	27	+5	37	Withdrew (Note: Myr Hornostayivka withdrew from the PFL during the winter break. (24 March 2014))
15	Arsenal-Kyivshchyna Bila Tserkva	36	9	7	20	27	57	−30	34	
16	Enerhiya Nova Kakhovka	36	9	4	23	38	85	−47	31	
17	Enerhiya Mykolaiv	36	9	3	24	24	28	−4	30	Withdrew (Note: Enerhiya Mykolaiv withdrew from the PFL during the winter break. (6 March 2014))
18	Skala Stryi	36	8	3	25	22	60	−38	27	
19	Dynamo Khmelnytskyi	36	3	2	31	18	52	−34	11	Withdrew (Note: Dynamo Khmelnytskyi withdrew from the PFL after Round 21. (14 November 2013))

Source: Professional Football League of Ukraine
Rules for classification: 1st points; 2nd goal difference; 3rd goals scored; 4th head-to-head points; 5th head-to-head goal difference; 6th head-to-head goals scored; 7th head-to-head fair play (all games); 8th draw or playoff
(C) Champions; (P) Promoted

=== Cup competitions ===
==== Ukrainian Cup ====
15 May 2014
20:00 EEST

Dynamo Kyiv	2–1	Shakhtar Donetsk
Kucher 40' (o.g.); Vida 43'	Report	Douglas 57'

Vorskla Stadium, Poltava
Attendance: 9,700
Referee: Yuriy Mozharovsky (Lviv)

==== Super Cup ====
10 July 2013

Chornomorets Odesa	1–3	Shakhtar Donetsk
Antonov 45+1'	Report	Fred 17', 33'; Taison 68' (pen.)

Chornomorets Stadium, Odesa
Attendance: 32,400
Referee: Serhiy Boyko

== Women's club football ==
League	Promoted to league	Relegated from league
Higher League	Voskhod Stara Maiachka	~~Lehenda-ShVSM Chernihiv~~; Ateks SDIuShOR-16 Kyiv

Note: For all scratched clubs, see section Clubs removed for more details

=== Higher League ===
2014 Vyshcha Liha (women)
