= 2020 Football Championship of Cherkasy Oblast =

Football Championship of Cherkasy Oblast
- Season: 2020

The 2020 Football Championship of Cherkasy Oblast is the 67th season of the competition.

Two teams withdrew from the competition Nasha Riaba Katerynopil and Dnipro Cherkasy.

== League table ==
| Pos | Team | Pld | W | D | L | GF | GA | GD | Pts |
|---|---|---|---|---|---|---|---|---|---|
| 1 | Zlatokrai-2017 Zolotonosha (C) | 14 | 10 | 2 | 2 | 28 | 12 | +16 | 32 |
| 2 | UTK-Yatran Uman | 14 | 9 | 2 | 3 | 37 | 11 | +26 | 29 |
| 3 | Bazys Kochubeyivka | 14 | 9 | 1 | 4 | 40 | 14 | +26 | 28 |
| 4 | Olimp Kamianka | 14 | 8 | 2 | 4 | 28 | 19 | +9 | 26 |
| 5 | Altayir Drabiv | 14 | 6 | 2 | 6 | 41 | 23 | +18 | 20 |
| 6 | Rosava Stepantsi | 14 | 5 | 5 | 4 | 22 | 11 | +11 | 20 |
| 7 | Avanhard Monastyryshche | 14 | 1 | 1 | 12 | 14 | 46 | −32 | 4 |
| 8 | Roden Kaniv | 14 | 0 | 1 | 13 | 5 | 79 | −74 | 1 |

Source: "Чемпіонат Черкаської області 2020". Footboom. Archived from the original on 2020-11-17.
(C) Champions
