= Viktor Oparenyuk =

Ukrainian association football player

Personal information
- Full name: Viktor Ivanovych Oparenyuk
- Date of birth: 23 March 1969 (age 57)
- Height: 1.68 m (5 ft 6 in)
- Positions: Defender; midfielder

Senior career*
Years	Team	Apps	(Gls)
1986–1987	PFC Nyva Vinnytsia	15	(0)
1987–1989	SKA Kiev		
1989	FC Podillya Kyrnasivka		
1990–1991	PFC Nyva Vinnytsia	23	(0)
1993–1994	FC Keramik Baranivka	1	(0)
1994–1995	FC Podillya Kyrnasivka		
1995	FC Zhemchuzhina Sochi	1	(0)
1995	→ FC Zhemchuzhina-2 Sochi (loan)	9	(1)
1995	FC Volgar-Gazprom Astrakhan	8	(0)
1995	FC Krystal Chortkiv		
1996	FC Svitanok Vinnytsia		
1996–1997	FC Kovel-Volyn-2 Kovel	3	(0)
1997	FC Shakhter-Ispat-Karmet	14	(0)
1998	FC Khimik Stepnogorsk	6	(0)
1999–2000	Eintracht Schwerin		
2000–2001	FC Vinnytsia	9	(0)
2012–2013	FC Saturn-Peremoha Vapniarka		
- * Club domestic league appearances and goals

Viktor Ivanovych Oparenyuk (Ukrainian: Віктор Іванович Опаренюк; born 23 March 1969) is a former Ukrainian football player.
