= 2013 Ukrainian Football Amateur League =

Ukrainian Football Amateur League
- Season: 2013
- Dates: 1 May – 22 September 2013
- Champions: ODEK Orzhiv (1st title) Rukh Vynnyky (losing finalist)
- Promoted: 2 – (Obolon-Brovar and Enerhiya)
- Relegated: 12 teams (withdrawn)

The 2013 Ukrainian Football Amateur League season.

== Teams ==
=== Returning/reformed clubs ===
- Bastion Illichivsk (returning, last played season in 2009 as Bastion-2)
- Zbruch Volochysk (returning, last played season in 2011)
- Avanhard Novohrad-Volynskyi (returning, last played season in 2011)

=== Debut ===
List of teams that are debuting this season in the league.

- Avanhard Koryukivka
- YSB Chernihiv
- Obolon-Brovar Kyiv
- Zorya Biloziria
- Barsa Sumy
- Enerhiya Mykolaiv
- USC-Rubin Donetsk
- Bukovyna-2-LS Chernivtsi
- Kolos Khlibodarivka
- Rukh Vynnyky
- Burevisnyk Petrove
- LKT-Slavutych
- FC Vinnytsia

=== Withdrawn ===
List of clubs that took part in last year's competition but chose not to participate in the 2013 season.

- Arsenal Kharkiv
- Olimpik Kirovohrad
- FC Foros
- Sovinyon Tayirove
- Karpaty Kolomyia
- FC Tarutyne
- Lehion Zhytomyr
- FC Volodarka

=== Locations ===
Location of participating teams of the 2013 Ukrainian amateur championship

== First stage ==
=== Group 1 ===
Pos	Team	Pld	W	D	L	GF	GA	GD	Pts	Qualification
1	Rukh Vynnyky (Q)	10	7	2	1	20	6	+14	23	Finals
2	ODEK Orzhiv (Q)	10	7	1	2	15	10	+5	22	Finals
3	Zbruch Volochysk	10	4	3	3	11	13	−2	15	
4	Vinnytsia	10	3	2	5	12	15	−3	11	
5	Avanhard Novohrad-Volynsky	10	2	1	7	11	17	−6	7	
6	Bukovyna-2-LS Chernivtsi	10	2	1	7	7	15	−8	7	

(Q) Qualified for the phase indicated

=== Group 2 ===
Pos	Team	Pld	W	D	L	GF	GA	GD	Pts	Qualification
1	Zoria Bilozirya (Q)	10	7	1	2	15	8	+7	22	Finals
2	YSB Chernihiv (Q)	10	5	3	2	9	5	+4	18	Finals
3	Retro Vatutine	10	3	4	3	9	9	0	13	
4	Avanhard Koryukivka	10	3	2	5	11	14	−3	11	
5	LKT-Slavutych	10	3	2	5	9	16	−7	11	
6	Obolon-Brovar Kyiv (Q)	10	1	4	5	4	5	−1	7	Second League

(Q) Qualified for the phase indicated

=== Group 3 ===
Pos	Team	Pld	W	D	L	GF	GA	GD	Pts	Qualification
1	Lokomotyv Kupiansk (Q)	8	4	3	1	9	4	+5	15	Finals
2	Burevisnyk Petrove (Q)	8	4	2	2	11	8	+3	14	Finals
3	Nove Zhyttia Andriyivka	8	2	3	3	9	10	−1	9	
4	YSK-Rubin Donetsk	8	2	2	4	9	11	−2	8	
5	Barsa Sumy	8	2	2	4	6	11	−5	8	

(Q) Qualified for the phase indicated

=== Group 4 ===
Pos	Team	Pld	W	D	L	GF	GA	GD	Pts	Qualification
1	Bastion Illichivsk (Q)	10	7	0	3	15	14	+1	21	Finals
2	Enerhiya Mykolaiv (Q)	10	6	1	3	17	5	+12	19	Second League
3	Hvardiyets Hvardiyske (Q)	10	5	3	2	18	7	+11	18	Finals
4	Torpedo Mykolaiv	10	3	2	5	14	10	+4	11	
5	Kolos Khlibodarivka	10	3	0	7	6	20	−14	9	
6	ITV Simferopol	10	2	0	8	4	18	−14	6	

(Q) Qualified for the phase indicated

== Finals ==
=== Group A ===
Pos	Team	Pld	W	D	L	GF	GA	GD	Pts	Qualification	ODK	LKU	BIL	YCH
1	ODEK Orzhiv (H, Q)	3	2	0	1	5	1	+4	6	Final game	—	1–0	4–0	0–1
2	Lokomotyv Kupiansk	3	2	0	1	5	1	+4	6			—	3–0	2–0
3	Bastion Illichivsk	3	1	0	2	2	8	−6	3				—	2–1
4	YSB Chernihiv	3	1	0	2	2	4	−2	3					—

(H) Hosts; (Q) Qualified for the phase indicated

=== Group B ===
Pos	Team	Pld	W	D	L	GF	GA	GD	Pts	Qualification	RVY	ZBI	HHV	BPE
1	Rukh Vynnyky (Q)	3	3	0	0	6	2	+4	9	Final game	—	2–0	3–2	1–0
2	Zoria Bilozirya (H)	3	2	0	1	5	3	+2	6			—	2–1	3–0
3	Hvardiyets Hvardiyske	3	1	0	2	6	6	0	3				—	3–1
4	Burevisnyk Petrove	3	0	0	3	1	7	−6	0					—

(H) Hosts; (Q) Qualified for the phase indicated

=== Championship match ===
22 September 2013

Rukh Vynnyky	1 – 1 (a.e.t.)	ODEK Orzhiv
Makar 21'	Report	Savytskyi 45+1'
Penalties
	3–4

Dinaz Stadium, Lyutizh, Kyiv Oblast
Attendance: 250
Referee: Vadym Saik

== Number of teams by region ==
Number	Region	Team(s)
2	Autonomous Republic of Crimea	Hvardiets Hvardiyske, ITV Simferopol
2	Cherkasy Oblast	Retro Vatutine, Zorya Bilozirya
2	Chernihiv Oblast	Avanhard Koryukivka, YSB Chernihiv
2	Mykolaiv Oblast	Enerhia Mykolaiv, Torpedo Mykolaiv
1	Chernivtsi Oblast	Bukovyna-2-LS Chernivtsi
1	Donetsk Oblast	USC-Rubin Donetsk
1	Kharkiv Oblast	Lokomotyv Kupiansk
1	Kherson Oblast	Kolos Khlibodarivka
1	Khmelnytskyi Oblast	Zbruch Volochysk
1	Kirovohrad Oblast	Burevisnyk Petrove
1	Kyiv	Obolon-Brovar
1	Kyiv Oblast	LKT-Slavutych
1	Lviv Oblast	Rukh Vynnyky
1	Odesa Oblast	Bastion Illichivsk
1	Poltava Oblast	Nove Zhyttia Andriivka
1	Rivne Oblast	ODEK Orzhiv
1	Sumy Oblast	Barsa Sumy
1	Vinnytsia Oblast	FC Vinnytsia
1	Zhytomyr Oblast	Avanhard Novohrad-Volynskyi

== See also ==
- 2013 Ukrainian Amateur Cup
