= 2013 Ukrainian Amateur Cup =

2013 Ukrainian Cup among amateurs
Tournament details
- Country: Ukraine
- Teams: 27

Final positions
- Champions: SC Chaika Petropavlivska Borshchahivka
- Runners-up: FC Yednist Plysky

The 2013 Ukrainian Amateur Cup was the eighteenth annual season of Ukraine's football knockout competition for amateur football teams. The competition started on 21 August 2013 and concluded on 2 November 2013.

The cup holders FC Nove Zhyttia Andriivka were defeated by SC Chaika Petropavlivska Borshchahivka in semifinals.

== Participated clubs ==
In bold are clubs that were active at the same season AAFU championship (parallel round-robin competition).

- Cherkasy Oblast (3): **Retro Vatutine**, Urahan Kryvonosivka, **Zorya-2 Biloziria**
- Chernihiv Oblast (2): **LKT-Slavutych Chernihiv**, Yednist Plysky
- Chernivtsi Oblast: Mayak Velykyi Kuchuriv
- Dnipropetrovsk Oblast: VPK-Ahro Shevchenkivka
- Ivano-Frankivsk Oblast: Hazovyk Bohorodchany
- Kharkiv Oblast: Kolos Zachepylivka
- Kherson Oblast: **Kolos Khlibodarivka**
- Kirovohrad Oblast: **Burevisnyk Petrove**
- Kyiv Oblast (2): Chaika Petropavlivska Borshchahivka, Dinaz Vyshhorod
- Lviv Oblast (2): SCC Demnya, **Rukh Vynnyky**
- Mykolaiv Oblast (3): Pervomaisk, **Torpedo Mykolaiv**, Varvarivka Mykolaiv
- Odesa Oblast: Balkany Zorya
- Poltava Oblast: **Nove Zhyttia Andriivka**
- Rivne Oblast (3): Malynsk, Mayak Sarny, **ODEK Orzhiv**
- Sumy Oblast: **Barsa Sumy**
- Vinnytsia Oblast: **Vinnytsia**
- Volyn Oblast: Laska Boratyn
- Zakarpattia Oblast: Petrovo Tiszapéterfalva

== Bracket ==
The following is the bracket that demonstrates the last four rounds of the Ukrainian Cup, including the final match. Numbers in parentheses next to the match score represent the results of a penalty shoot-out.

Round of 16
SCC Demnya	0	2	2
ODEK Orzhiv	1	2	3
Hazovyk Bohorodchany	1	0	1 (3)
Rukh Vynnyky (p)	0	1	1 (4)
Laska Boratyn	0	0	0
FC Vinnytsia	2	4	6
Retro Vatutine	0	0	0
Yednist Plysky	0	1	1
Burevisnyk Petrove	3	2	5
Dinaz Vyshhorod	0	1	1
Chaika Petropavlivska Borshchahivka	1	1	2
Kolos Zachepylivka	0	1	1
Nove Zhyttia Andriyivka	2	1	3
MFC Pervomaisk	0	1	1
Varvarivka Mykolaiv	1	0	1
Kolos Khlibodarivka	0	2	2

Quarter-finals
ODEK Orzhiv	0	-	-
Rukh Vynnyky	4	+	+
Yednist Plysky (a)	1	2	3
FC Vinnytsia	1	2	3
Chaika Petropavlivska Borshchahivka	3	0	3
Burevisnyk Petrove	0	2	2
Nove Zhyttia Andriyivka	4	2	6
Kolos Khlibodarivka	0	2	2

Semi-finals
Rukh Vynnyky	3	0	3
Yednist Plysky (a)	1	2	3
Nove Zhyttia Andriyivka	1	0	1
Chaika Petropavlivska Borshchahivka	0	2	2

Final
Chaika Petropavlivska Borshchahivka	3	2	5
Yednist Plysky	0	3	3

== Competition schedule ==
=== First qualification round ===
Team 1	Agg.	Team 2	1st leg	2nd leg
SCC Demnya	5 – 0	Petrovo Tiszapéterfalva	2–0	3–0
Mayak Velykyi Kuchuriv	2 – 6	Hazovyk Bohorodchany	1–4	1–2
FC Malynsk	3 – 3 (4–5 p)	Laska Boratyn	0–3	3–0 (a.e.t.)
Mayak Sarny	2 – 2 (a)	FC Vinnytsia	2–1	0–1
Yednist Plysky	6 – 2	Barsa Sumy	2–0	4–2
Burevisnyk Petrove	2 – 2	VPK-Ahro Shevchenkivka	1–0	1–2
Chaika Petropavlivska Borshchahivka	4 – 2	Zorya-2 Biloziria	2–1	2–1
Kolos Zachepylivka	7 – 4	LKT-Slavutych Chernihiv	3–1	4–3
Pervomaisk	10 – 2	Urahan Kryvonosivka	5–0	5–2
Varvarivka Mykolaiv	2 – 0	Balkany Zorya	2–0	0–0
Kolos Khlibodarivka	2 – 1	Torpedo Mykolaiv	1–0	1–1

- Byes: ODEK Orzhiv, Rukh Vynnyky, Retro Vatutine, Dinaz Vyshhorod, Nove Zhyttia Andriivka

=== Second qualification round ===
Team 1	Agg.	Team 2	1st leg	2nd leg
SCC Demnya	2 – 3	ODEK Orzhiv	0–1	2–2
Hazovyk Bohorodchany	1 – 1 (3–4 p)	Rukh Vynnyky	1–0	0–1 (a.e.t.)
Laska Boratyn	0 – 6	FC Vinnytsia	0–2	0–4
Retro Vatutine	0 – 1	Yednist Plysky	0–0	0–1
Burevisnyk Petrove	5 – 1	Dinaz Vyshhorod	3–0	2–1
Chaika Petropavlivska Borshchahivka	2 – 1	Kolos Zachepylivka	1–0	1–1
Nove Zhyttia Andriyivka	3 – 1	MFC Pervomaisk	2–0	1–1
Varvarivka Mykolaiv	1 – 2	Kolos Khlibodarivka	1–0	0–2 (a.e.t.)

=== Quarterfinals (1/4) ===
Team 1	Agg.	Team 2	1st leg	2nd leg
ODEK Orzhiv	0 – 7	Rukh Vynnyky	0–4	0–3
Yednist Plysky	3 – 3 (a)	FC Vinnytsia	1–1	2–2
Chaika Petropavlivska Borshchahivka	3 – 2	Burevisnyk Petrove	3–0	0–2
Nove Zhyttia Andriyivka	6 – 2	Kolos Khlibodarivka	4–0	2–2

=== Semifinals (1/2) ===
Team 1	Agg.	Team 2	1st leg	2nd leg
Rukh Vynnyky	3 – 3 (a)	Yednist Plysky	3–1	0–2
Nove Zhyttia Andriyivka	1 – 2	Chaika Petropavlivska Borshchahivka	1–0	0–2

=== Final ===
Team 1	Agg.	Team 2	1st leg	2nd leg
Chaika Petropavlivska Borshchahivka	5 – 3	Yednist Plysky	3–0	2–3 (a.e.t.)

Winner of the 2013 Ukrainian Football Cup among amateur teams
Chaika Petropavlivska Borshchahivka (Kyiv Oblast); 1st time

== See also ==
- 2013 Ukrainian Football Amateur League
- 2013–14 Ukrainian Cup
