= 2013–14 Ukrainian Second League =

Ukrainian Second League
- Season: 2013–14
- Country: Ukraine
- Teams: 19
- Champions: Hirnyk-Sport Komsomolsk
- Promoted: Stal Dniprodzerzhynsk; Hirnyk-Sport; FC Ternopil; Hirnyk Kryvyi Rih
- Relegated: ~~Shakhtar Sverdlovsk~~ (withdrew); ~~FC Karlivka~~ (withdrew); ~~Myr Hornostayivka~~ (withdrew); ~~Enerhiya Mykolaiv~~ (withdrew); ~~Dynamo Khmelnytskyi~~ (withdrew)
- Matches: 293
- Goals: 791 (2.7 per match)
- Top goalscorer: 31 – Stanislav Kulish (Stal)
- Biggest home win: Krystal 8–1 Dynamo (Round 17)
- Biggest away win: Enerhiya N.K. 1–6 Stal (Round 16); Hirnyk 0–5 Hirnyk-Sport (Round 31)
- Highest scoring: 9 goals – Krystal 8–1 Dynamo (Round 17)
- Longest winning run: 7 – Hirnyk-Sport (Round 19–25)
- Longest unbeaten run: 12 – Ternopil (Round 11–19, 21–23)
- Longest winless run: 12 – Krystal (Round 3–8, 10–15)
- Longest losing run: 8 – Dynamo (Round 14–21)
- Highest attendance: 3,100 – Slavutych–Ternopil (Round 32)
- Lowest attendance: 0 – 3 matches (Round 33)

The 2013–14 Ukrainian Second League was the 23rd season of 3rd level professional football in Ukraine. The competition was consolidated from two groups to one round robin competition. The list of teams was approved by Central Committee of the Professional Football League of Ukraine on 20 June 2013. Final decision was adapted by the PFL Conference on 26 June 2013. The competition began on 14 July 2013 and had a break winter from 30 November 2013. The competition resumed on 29 March 2014.

== Team changes ==
=== Admitted teams ===
The following teams were admitted by the PFL after playing in the 2013 Ukrainian Football Amateur League and passing attestation.

- FC Enerhiya Mykolaiv – initial group stage (debut)
- FC Obolon-Brovar Kyiv – initial group stage (returning after an absence of 13 seasons)

=== Relegated teams ===
- FC Arsenal Bila Tserkva – (returning after an absence of four seasons)

=== Withdrawn teams ===
- FC Odesa were originally relegated from the Ukrainian First League but withdrew from the PFL prior to the start of the season
- FC Sevastopol-2 were withdrawn by the main club and will participate in the 2013–14 Ukrainian Premier League Reserves and Under 19 competition

=== Expelled teams ===
- FC Zhemchuzhyna Yalta was refused attestation and expelled

=== Name changes ===
- FC Arsenal Bila Tserkva was renamed to FC Arsenal-Kyivshchyna Bila Tserkva.
- Prior to the start of the season FC Poltava-2 Karlivka severed its ties with FC Poltava as their Reserve team and reregistered with the PFL as FC Karlivka staying in Karlivka.
- During the last season Real Pharm had moved to Ovidiopol. Prior to the start of the season the club had registered its name as Real Pharma Ovidiopol.

== Location map ==
The following displays the location of teams.

Location of teams in the 2013–14 Ukrainian Second League

== League table ==
Pos	Team	Pld	W	D	L	GF	GA	GD	Pts	Promotion or relegation
1	Hirnyk-Sport Komsomolsk (C, P)	36	25	4	7	68	31	+37	79	Promoted to Ukrainian First League
2	Stal Dniprodzerzhynsk (P)	36	23	8	5	81	32	+49	77	Promoted to Ukrainian First League
3	FC Ternopil (P)	36	20	11	5	56	27	+29	71	Promoted to Ukrainian First League
4	Hirnyk Kryvyi Rih (P)	36	20	10	6	49	36	+13	70	Promoted to Ukrainian First League
5	Shakhtar Sverdlovsk	36	19	10	7	48	29	+19	67	Suspended (Note: Shakhtar Sverdlovsk completed the season but was suspended from the PFL after the season due to the war in Donbas.)
6	Slavutych Cherkasy	36	20	5	11	49	33	+16	65	
7	Kremin Kremenchuk	36	19	7	10	54	28	+26	64	
8	Obolon-Brovar Kyiv	36	16	12	8	51	34	+17	60	
9	Krystal Kherson	36	15	8	13	51	48	+3	53	
10	Shakhtar-3 Donetsk	36	17	2	17	50	50	0	53	
11	Real Pharma Ovidiopol	36	14	5	17	30	57	−27	47	
12	FC Karlivka	36	13	5	18	31	48	−17	44	Withdrew (Note: FC Karlivka completed the season but failed to submit a license for the next.)
13	Makiyivvuhillya Makiyivka	36	12	6	18	33	50	−17	42	
14	Myr Hornostayivka	36	11	4	21	32	27	+5	37	Withdrew (Note: Myr Hornostayivka withdrew from the PFL during the winter break. (24 March 2014))
15	Arsenal-Kyivshchyna Bila Tserkva	36	9	7	20	27	57	−30	34	
16	Enerhiya Nova Kakhovka	36	9	4	23	38	85	−47	31	
17	Enerhiya Mykolaiv	36	9	3	24	24	28	−4	30	Withdrew (Note: Enerhiya Mykolaiv withdrew from the PFL during the winter break. (6 March 2014))
18	Skala Stryi	36	8	3	25	22	60	−38	27	
19	Dynamo Khmelnytskyi	36	3	2	31	18	52	−34	11	Withdrew (Note: Dynamo Khmelnytskyi withdrew from the PFL after Round 21. (14 November 2013))

Source: Professional Football League of Ukraine
Rules for classification: 1st points; 2nd goal difference; 3rd goals scored; 4th head-to-head points; 5th head-to-head goal difference; 6th head-to-head goals scored; 7th head-to-head fair play (all games); 8th draw or playoff
(C) Champions; (P) Promoted

=== Withdrawn teams ===
==== Dynamo Khmelnytskyi ====
On 14 November the Football Club Dynamo Khmelnytskyi informed the PFL informed that the club would not travel to their Round 22 match against Shakhtar-3 Donetsk, indicating that the club would be withdrawing from the professional ranks. Control Disciplinary Committee of the Football Federation of Ukraine confirmed the withdrawal after the team had not fulfilled playing two games during the season. All of their matches after Round 21 are considered technical losses. The club played twenty matches in the League and had a record of 3 wins, 2 draws and 15 losses (including a technical loss) with 18 goals scored and 49 allowed. (21 November 2013)

==== Enerhiya Mykolaiv ====
On 6 March the administration of Enerhiya Mykolaiv informed that the club would not be funded by MykolaivOblEnerho hence leaving the club defunct. All of their matches after Round 23 are considered technical losses. The club played twenty two matches in the League and had a record of 9 wins, 3 draws and 15 losses (including a technical loss) with 24 goals scored and 28 allowed. (6 March 2014)

==== Myr Hornostayivka ====
On 14 February the administration of Myr Hornostayivka informed that the club would not continue competing in the Second League. The president of the club informed the players that they are free agents. The club was officially withdrawn from the PFL later in March before the start of the spring session of the competition. All of their matches after Round 23 are considered technical losses. The club played twenty three matches in the League and had a record of 11 wins, 4 draws and 8 losses with 32 goals scored and 27 allowed. (24 March 2014)

==== Shakhtar Sverdlovsk ====
In summer of 2014 participation of the club in the Professional League competitions was suspended due to the Russian invasion of Ukraine. In summer of 2015 the club was officially withdrawn from the league.

=== Results ===
As of 7 June 2014

Home \ Away	AKB	DKH	ENM	ENK	HIR	HIS	KAR	KRE	KRK	MKM	MYH	OBK	RPO	SHS	SH3	SKS	SLC	STD	TNP
Arsenal-Kyivschyna Bila Tserkva		1–0	+:-	1–1	0–1	1–1	1–0	1–2	0–1	0–0	0–1	0–0	0–1	1–2	1–1	2–0	1–2	0–3	2–1
Dynamo Khmelnytskyi	2–4		0–1	-:+	-:+	-:+	1–3	1–3	-:+	-:+	-:+	-:+	0–1	1–3	0–1	4–1	1–2	2–2	2–1
Enerhiya Mykolaiv (Note: Enerhiya Mykolaiv moved their home matches to Central Stadium in Pervomaisk, Mykolaiv Oblast since the club was unable to prepare their home ground in Mykolaiv for the start of the season. (22 July 2013))	3–0	-:-		-:+	0–2	1–2	-:+	-:+	1–0	0–1	-:-	0–0	2–1	-:+	-:+	4–2	1–2	2–1	2–1
Enerhiya Nova Kakhovka	1–3	1–2	2–4		1–1	2–3	2–0	1–0	1–4	1–0	1–4	1–0	0–2	0–1	3–2	2–3	0–3 (Note: Round 29 match between Enerhiya Nova Kakhovka and Slavutych Cherkasy rescheduled and to be played during Round 36 when both teams have vacant dates due to byes or matches against teams that have withdrawn from the competition.)	1–6	0–1
Hirnyk Kryvyi Rih	2–0	3–0 (Note: Administration of Dynamo Khmelnytskyi informed that the club would not travel to their Round 15 match against Hirnyk Kryvyi Rih due to financial issues. Control Disciplinary Committee of the Football Federation of Ukraine award a 3–0 technical victory to Hirnyk.)	+:-	3–2		0–5	2–2	1–0	1–0	1–0	3–1	1–2	6–0	0–0	1–1	3–0	2–1	1–1	2–2
Hirnyk-Sport Komsomolsk	3–0	1–0	+:-	4–1	0–3		5–0	0–2	0–0	4–0	1–2	1–0	7–1	4–1	3–0	1–0	1–0	0–0	2–2
FC Karlivka	1–2	+:-	3–1	2–0	0–1	2–1		0–4	0–0	2–0	+:-	1–3	0–1	1–0	1–2	1–0	4–0	0–1	0–0
Kremin Kremenchuk	3–1	5–0	0–0	4–2	0–0	1–2	0–0		2–0	3–0	2–0	1–0	4–0	0–0	1–0	2–0	1–2	0–2	0–2
Krystal Kherson	6–2	8–1	+:-	2–1	1–1	1–2	1–3	0–1		2–2	1–1	0–1	2–1	2–2	4–2	3–1	1–0	2–3	1–0
Makiyivvuhillya Makiyivka	5–0	4–0	0–1	1–2	3–2	1–2 (Note: Round 27 match between Makiyivvuhillya Makiyivka and Hirnyk-Sport Komsomolsk postponed until after Round 29.)	1–0	0–0	1–3		2–4	2–2	3–0	1–3	2–0	1–0 (Note: The PFL moves Round 35 match between Shakhtar Sverdlovsk and Kremin Kreminchuk was moved Trudovyi Reservy Stadium in Bila Tserkva due to the civil unrest in Donetsk oblast. The match between Makiyivvuhillya Makiyivka and Skala Stryi was also moved to Metalurh Stadium in Dniprodzerzhinsk.)	ppd. (Note: Round 33 matches between Shakhtar Sverdlovsk and Shakhtar-3 Donetsk and Makiyivvuhillya Makiyivka and Slavutych Cherkasy postponed due to the decision of the Football Federation of Ukraine not conducting matches in Donetsk, Kharkiv, Luhansk and Odesa oblasts due to continual unrest in the region. The PFL ruled a technical victory to Shakhtar Sverdlovsk due to the force majeure circumstances that were created due to war conditions in the area and awarded Shakhtar Sverdlovsk a technical victory.)	1–2	1–0 (Note: Round 37 match between Makiyivvuhillya Makiyivka and FC Ternopil was moved to Union of Creative Youth Stadium in Dnipropetrovsk due to the war in Donbas.)
Myr Hornostayivka	1–1	3–0	1–0	-:+	-:+	0–1	1–0	2–1	-:+	-:+		-:+	-:+	2–0	4–1	0–3	1–2	1–2	1–1
Obolon-Brovar Kyiv	2–0	1–1	0–0	1–0	6–0	1–2	1–1	4–2	0–0	4–0	2–1		1–0	2–2	0–1	5–0	1–0	4–2	2–2
Real Pharma Odesa	1–0	+:-	+:-	4–2	3–1	0–2	abn. (Note: The Round 36 match between Real Pharma and FC Karlivka was to be played Krystal Stadium in Kherson but FC Karlivka decided not arrive for the match due to the late scheduling change.)	0–1	1–2	0–0	1–1	0–0		0–3	1–2	1–0	0–0	0–3	0–0
Shakhtar Sverdlovsk (Note: Due to the construction of the N.I. Horiushkin Memorial Stadium in Sverdlovsk, Shakhtar Sverdlovsk moved their home matches to Avanhard Stadium in Rovenky. (20 July 2013))	2–0	+:-	2–1	4–0	0–0 (Note: Round 30 match between Shakhtar Sverdlovsk and Hirnyk Kryvyi Rih was postponed to 29 May due to the war in Donbas. The match was moved to Trudovyi Reservy Stadium in Bila Tserkva due matches not played in Donetsk oblast.)	0–2	0–2	0–0	4–0 (Note: Round 32 match between Shakhtar Sverdlovsk and Krystal Kherson was postponed due to the war in Donbas. Match to be played after Round 37 at Trudovyi Reservy Stadium in Bila Tserkva.)	2–0	2–0	0–0	5–2		+:-	abd. (Note: Round 32 match Shakhtar-3 Donetsk and Skala Stryi was initially postponed due to unrest in the region and was to be played after Round 37. Skala team administration informed the PFL that due to health of many players the club will not travel for their scheduled match.)	2–0	4–2	1–1
Shakhtar-3 Donetsk	2–0	3–0 (Note: Administration of Dynamo Khmelnytskyi informed that the club would not travel to their Round 22 match against Shakhtar-3 Donetsk, indicating that the club would be withdrawing from the professional ranks. Control Disciplinary Committee of the Football Federation of Ukraine award a 3–0 technical victory to Shakhtar-3. (14 November 2013))	2–0	6–2	0–2	1–2	1–0	1–3	3–1	-:+ (Note: Round 38 match between Makiyivvuhillya Makiyivka and Shakhtar-3 Donetsk will not be played due to the force majeure circumstances that were created due to war conditions in the area, The PFL awarded Makiyivvuhillya Makiyivka a technical victory.)	+:-	2–3 (Note: Round 34 match between Shakhtar-3 Donetsk and Obolon-Brovar Kyiv is moved due to decisions made by the FFU of not conducting matches in Donetsk, Kharkiv, Luhansk and Odesa oblasts because of unrest in the region. The match to be played at Kyiv at Obolon Stadium.)	2–0	3–0		1–0	1–2	1–3	1–4 (Note: The PFL moves Round 36 match between Shakhtar-3 Donetsk and FC Ternopil was moved to Yunist Stadium in Komsomolsk due to the civil unrest in Donetsk oblast.)
Skala Stryi	0–1	+:-	+:-	2–2	0–1	1–2	1–0	0–2	2–2	3–0	+:-	1–0	0–2	0–1	0–1		0–2	2–5	0–1
Slavutych Cherkasy (Note: Due to the reconstruction of the athletic running track at Slavutych's home ground Central Stadium, the Round 6 match against Real Pharma Ovidiopol and the Round 8 match against Shakhtar-3 Donetsk was played at Zorya Stadium in Bilozirya, located about 20 km (12 mi) southwest from Cherkasy. (1 September 2013))	3–0	+:-	+:-	2–2	1–1	2–1	4–1	1–0	5–0	2–0	+:-	2–1	2–3	0–0	1–2	0–0		2–1	0–1 (Note: Round 32 match between Slavutych Cherkasy and FC Ternopil brought forward to prior to Round 29 due to Slavutych Cherkasy playing in the Semi-final of the Ukrainian Cup.)
Stal Dniprodzerzhynsk	0–0	+:-	3–0	7–1	0–1	2–0	6–1	2–2	1–0	2–1	+:-	6–0	3–0	1–1	4–1	3–0	1–0		0–0
FC Ternopil	3–1	+:-	3–0 (Note: Administration of Enerhiya Mykolaiv informed that the club would not travel to their Round 21 match against FC Ternopil due to temporary financial issues. Control Disciplinary Committee of the Football Federation of Ukraine award a 3–0 technical victory to FC Ternopil.)	3–0 (Note: Administration of Enerhiya Nova Kakhovka informed that the club would not travel to their Round 33 match against FC Ternopil due to difficult financial situation and lack of transportation. Control Disciplinary Committee of the Football Federation of Ukraine award a 3–0 technical victory to FC Ternopil.)	4–0	3–1	2–0	3–2 (Note: Round 27 match between FC Ternopil and Kremin Kreminchuk postponed until after Round 30.)	2–1	0–0	+:-	2–2	3–0	1–0	2–1	2–0	2–1	1–1	

Updated to match(es) played on 7 June 2014. Source: PFL Druha League calendar (in Ukrainian)
Legend: Blue = home team win; Yellow = draw; Red = away team win.

=== Round by round ===
The following table represents the teams position after each round in the competition.

Team ╲ Round	1	2	3	4	5	6	7	8	9	10	11	12	13	14	15	16	17	18	19	20	21	22	23	24	25	26	27	28	29	30	31	32	33	34	35	36	37	38
Hirnyk-Sport Komsomolsk	5	9	13	7	5	3	4	4	7	9	6	9	9	10	8	7	8	9	7	6	5	4	3	2	2	2	2	2	5	2	3	2	2	2	2	2	2	1
Stal Dniprodzerzhynsk	6	2	5	8	11	8	6	9	8	4	5	6	5	5	2	1	1	2	3	2	1	1	1	1	1	1	1	1	1	1	1	1	1	1	1	1	1	2
FC Ternopil	12	15	12	12	8	11	8	6	3	5	4	3	3	2	1	2	2	1	2	3	3	5	5	5	3	3	3	5	2	3	2	3	3	3	3	3	4	3
Hirnyk Kryvyi Rih	7	10	15	9	7	10	7	5	5	6	8	5	4	3	5	6	4	3	1	1	2	2	4	4	6	5	6	4	3	4	4	4	4	4	4	4	3	4
Shakhtar Sverdlovsk	16	11	6	4	4	4	3	3	4	2	3	4	6	7	9	8	7	6	6	4	4	3	2	3	4	4	4	6	4	5	6	6	7	8	8	8	8	5
Kremin Kremenchuk	2	1	4	6	10	7	12	12	12	12	14	13	13	13	13	13	13	12	11	10	8	6	8	7	7	7	8	7	7	8	5	5	5	5	5	7	5	6
Slavutych Cherkasy	1	7	3	3	2	2	2	2	2	3	1	1	2	1	3	4	3	4	5	7	6	8	6	6	5	6	5	3	6	6	8	8	8	7	7	6	7	7
Obolon-Brovar Kyiv	10	5	7	5	6	9	5	7	9	10	7	8	8	8	10	10	10	8	10	11	10	7	7	8	10	10	9	9	9	9	7	7	6	6	6	5	6	8
Krystal Kherson	19	13	11	15	16	16	16	17	17	17	18	19	18	19	19	17	14	14	14	14	13	12	12	11	11	11	12	11	11	11	10	10	10	11	10	10	9	9
Shakhtar-3 Donetsk	8	14	9	13	9	5	9	10	10	8	10	7	7	6	4	5	6	7	9	9	9	10	10	10	8	8	7	8	8	7	9	9	9	9	9	9	10	10
Real Pharma Odesa	17	19	16	10	13	13	11	8	6	7	9	10	10	11	11	11	9	11	12	13	14	13	13	14	12	12	11	10	10	10	11	11	11	10	11	11	12	11
FC Karlivka	18	12	10	11	14	14	15	14	13	15	15	12	12	12	12	12	12	13	13	12	12	14	14	13	14	14	13	13	13	13	12	12	12	12	12	12	11	12
Makiyivvuhillya Makiyivka	13	16	18	18	17	17	17	18	18	18	17	17	17	17	17	19	18	18	15	15	17	15	15	15	16	16	16	16	16	16	15	14	14	15	14	14	13	13
Myr Hornostayivka	3	3	1	1	1	1	1	1	1	1	2	2	1	4	6	3	5	5	4	5	7	9	9	9	9	9	10	12	12	12	13	13	13	13	13	13	14	14
Arsenal-Kyivschyna Bila Tserkva	9	6	8	14	15	15	13	13	14	14	12	14	15	15	14	14	15	15	16	16	15	16	16	16	15	15	15	15	15	15	16	15	15	14	15	15	16	15
Enerhiya Nova Kakhovka	4	8	14	16	12	12	14	15	16	16	13	15	16	16	15	15	16	16	17	17	18	18	18	18	18	17	18	17	18	18	18	18	18	17	17	17	17	16
Enerhiya Mykolaiv	11	4	2	2	3	6	10	11	11	11	11	11	11	9	7	9	11	10	8	8	11	11	11	12	13	13	14	14	14	14	14	16	16	16	16	16	16	17
Skala Stryi	14	17	17	17	18	18	19	19	19	19	19	18	19	18	18	16	17	17	18	18	16	17	17	17	17	18	17	18	17	17	17	17	17	18	18	18	18	18
Dynamo Khmelnytskyi	15	18	19	19	19	19	18	16	15	13	16	16	14	14	16	18	19	19	19	19	19	19	19	19	19	19	19	19	19	19	19	19	19	19	19	19	19	19

Updated to match(es) played on 31 May 2014. Source: pfl.ua

== Top goalscorers ==
As of 8 June 2014

#	Scorer	Goals (Pen.)	Team
1	(Ukraine) Stanislav Kulish	31 (3)	Stal Dniprodzerzhynsk
2	(Ukraine) Ihor Kiriyenko	27 (3)	Hirnyk-Sport Komsomolsk
3	(Ukraine) Andriy Ilyashov	15	Hirnyk Kryvyi Rih
3	(Ukraine) Bohdan Semenets	15	FC Ternopil
5	(Ukraine) Yuriy Komyahin	14 (1)	Enerhiya Nova Kakhovka
5	(Ukraine) Serhiy Stepanchuk	14 (2)	Kremin Kremenchuk

== See also ==
- 2013–14 Ukrainian Premier League
- 2013–14 Ukrainian First League
- 2013–14 Ukrainian Cup
