= FC Zoria-Akademiia Biloziria =

- Full name: FC Cherkashchyna-Akademiia Biloziria
- Founded: 1965
- Ground: Zoria Stadium, Biloziria
- Capacity: 1,000
- Chairman: Volodymyr Lashkul
- League: Cherkasy Oblast Football Federation

FC Zoria-Akademiia Biloziria (Ukrainian: Черкащина-Академія Білозір'я) is an amateur Ukrainian football club from the city of Biloziria, Cherkasy Raion. It was a farm club of the FC Cherkashchyna and was known as formerly FC Cherkaskyi Dnipro-2 and FC Cherkashchyna-Akademiia-2 Biloziria.

== History ==
Old logo of the club.

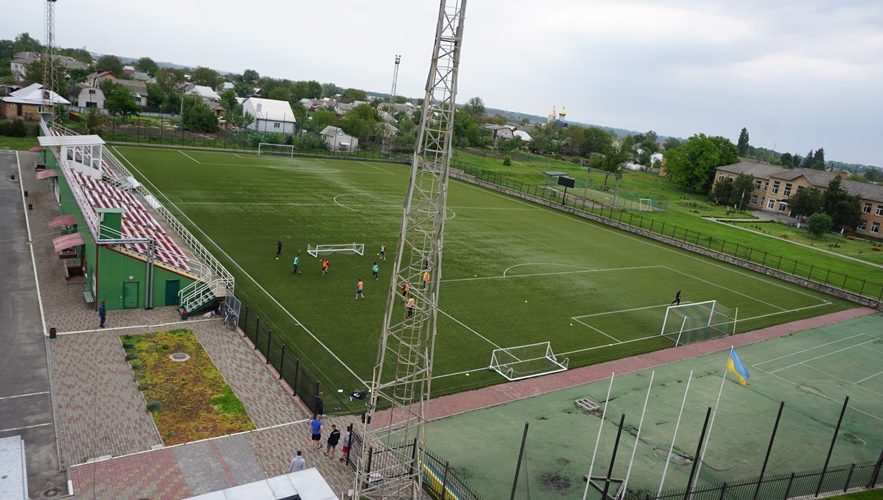
Zorya Stadium

The club was formed in 1965.

In 2010's, FC Zoria Biloziria became one of the best amateur teams in the Cherkasy Oblast Championship. In 2010, the team won the Oblast Cup and were runners-up in the Oblast Championship. The following season they were once again silver medalists in the Oblast Championship. In 2012, Zoria captured the double – winning both the Oblast championship and Oblast cup, and first made their debut in the Ukrainian Amateur championship and Ukrainian Amateur Cup championship. That same year, the club opened a modern stadium with an artificial surface, displays, lighting and stands for 1,000 suррorters.

Until late 2014, it was a separate football club from the village of Biloziria, Cherkasy Raion (district), Cherkasy Oblast. The club has applied to the Professional Football League of Ukraine and has passed attestation to play in the Ukrainian Second League for the 2014–15 season. In July 2014, FC Zorya Biloziria was reported to be supposedly merged with FC Slavutych Cherkasy, but continued its participation in amateur competitions. On 23 December 2014, it was confirmed that the club from Biloziria officially merged with the FC Cherkaskyi Dnipro as its farm team with name FC Zorya-Cherkaskyi Dnipro-2.

FC Cherkaskyi Dnipro was dissolved in July 2018, and FC Cherkashchyna-Akademiia Biloziria took their place in the Ukrainian Second League. FC Zorya-Akademiya was renamed as FC Cherkashchyna-Akademiia-2 Biloziria and continues compete at regional level. During winter break 2019–20 the senior team was abandoned by its owners and taken over by Football Federation of Cherkasy Oblast to avoid withdrawal of the club mid season. The former owners reorganized based on their own club FC Zorya-Akademia Bilozirya.

== Honors ==
- Cherkasy Oblast Football Championship
  - Winners (3): 2012, 2013, 2014 (all as Zoria Biloziria)
- Cherkasy Oblast Cup
  - Winners (2): 2010, 2012

== League and cup history ==
Season	Div.	Pos.	Pl.	W	D	L	GS	GA	P	Domestic Cup	Europe	Notes
2013	4th	1	10	7	1	2	15	8	22			
2013	4th	2	3	2	0	1	5	3	6			3rd place shared with Lokomotyv Kupiansk
2014	4th	1	10	8	2	0	14	4	26			
2014	4th	3	3	1	1	1	4	3	4			
2017–18	3rd	Withdrawn before the season										
