= Mikhail Krichevsky =

Jewish-Ukrainian supercentenarian

- Born: 25 February 1897; Karlovka, Poltava Governorate, Russian Empire
- Died: 26 December 2008 (aged 111 years, 305 days); Donetsk, Ukraine
- Military career
- Allegiance: Russian Empire
- Branch: Imperial Russian Army
- Service years: 1917
- Rank: Praporshchik
- Unit: Engineering corps
- Conflicts: World War I; Southwestern Front
- Awards: Order of the Red Banner of Labour

Mikhail Yefimovich Krichevsky (Ukrainian: Михайло Юхимович Кричевський, Russian: Михаил Ефимович Кричевский; 25 February 1897 – 26 December 2008) was a Jewish-Ukrainian supercentenarian and the last surviving World War I veteran who fought for the Russian Empire.

== Career ==
Krichevsky was mobilized into the Imperial Russian Army in 1917 and was sent to the Southwestern Front, after graduating from the Kiev Military Engineering School as an engineer-praporshchik.

== Personal life ==
After the October Revolution he returned home, where he settled and lived in Donetsk with his son and daughter-in-law.

Mikhail Krichevsky died in 2008 at the age of 111 years, 305 days.

== See also ==
- List of last surviving World War I veterans
