= FC Karlivka =

Professional football club based in Karlivka, Ukraine

- Full name: FC Karlivka
- Founded: 2011
- Ground: Mashynobudivnyk Stadium
- Capacity: 1,300
- Chairman: Andriy Sokil
- Manager: Serhiy Lukash
- League: Poltava Oblast League
- 2017–18: 10th

FC Karlivka was an amateur Ukrainian football club that was based in Karlivka, Poltavska Oblast.

== History ==
=== Predecessors ===
The first recorded team from Karlivka in Ukrainian republican football competitions appeared at the 1951 Football Championship of the Ukrainian SSR where among 10 teams in its group it placed second to the last.

The list of previous football teams from Karlivka that competed at republican level

- Kolhospnyk Karlivka 1951
- Naftovyk Karlivka 1984
- Trud Karlivka 1989
- Zoria Karlivka 1990, 1991

=== Current ===
The club was formed in 2011 as FC Karlivka and competed in amateur competitions including the Poltava oblast.

The club forged a tie with FC Poltava after the senior club was promoted to the Ukrainian First League in 2012 the main club entered the team as a Reserve team into the Ukrainian Second League competition for the 2012–13 season.

The club play their home games at the main club's training facilities in the town of Karlivka which is located approximately 50 kilometres (31 mi) from Poltava. Mashynobudivnyk Stadium was reconstructed in 2012 with a capacity for 1,300 spectators.

Prior to the start of the 2013–14 Ukrainian Second League season the club severed its ties with FC Poltava as their Reserve team and reregistered with the PFL as FC Karlivka.

== Name ==
- 2011– Jun. 2012 – FC Karlivka
- Jul. 2012– Jun. 2013 – FC Poltava-2 Karlivka
- Jun. 2013– FC Karlivka

== League and cup history ==
Season	Div.	Pos.	Pl.	W	D	L	GS	GA	P	Domestic Cup	Europe	Notes
2012–13	3rd "B"	4	24	11	11	2	29	15	44			
2012–13	3rd "2"	4	34	13	16	5	41	27	55			Stage 2
2013–14	3rd	12	36	13	5	18	31	48	44	1/32 finals		Withdrew
