= Karlivka (disambiguation) =

Karlivka (Ukrainian Карлівка) is the name of several places in Ukraine:

Cities:

- Karlivka – in Poltava Oblast

Villages:

- Karlivka – in Pokrovsk Raion, Donetsk Oblast
- Karlivka – in Nova Odesa Raion, Mykolaiv Oblast
- Klishchiivka (until 1945 Karlivka) – in Bakhmut Raion, Donetsk Oblast

Districts:

- Karlivka Raion – in Poltava Oblast
