= Mashynobudivnyk Stadium =

Football stadium in Karlivka, Ukraine

Coordinates: 49°27′09″N 35°08′02″E

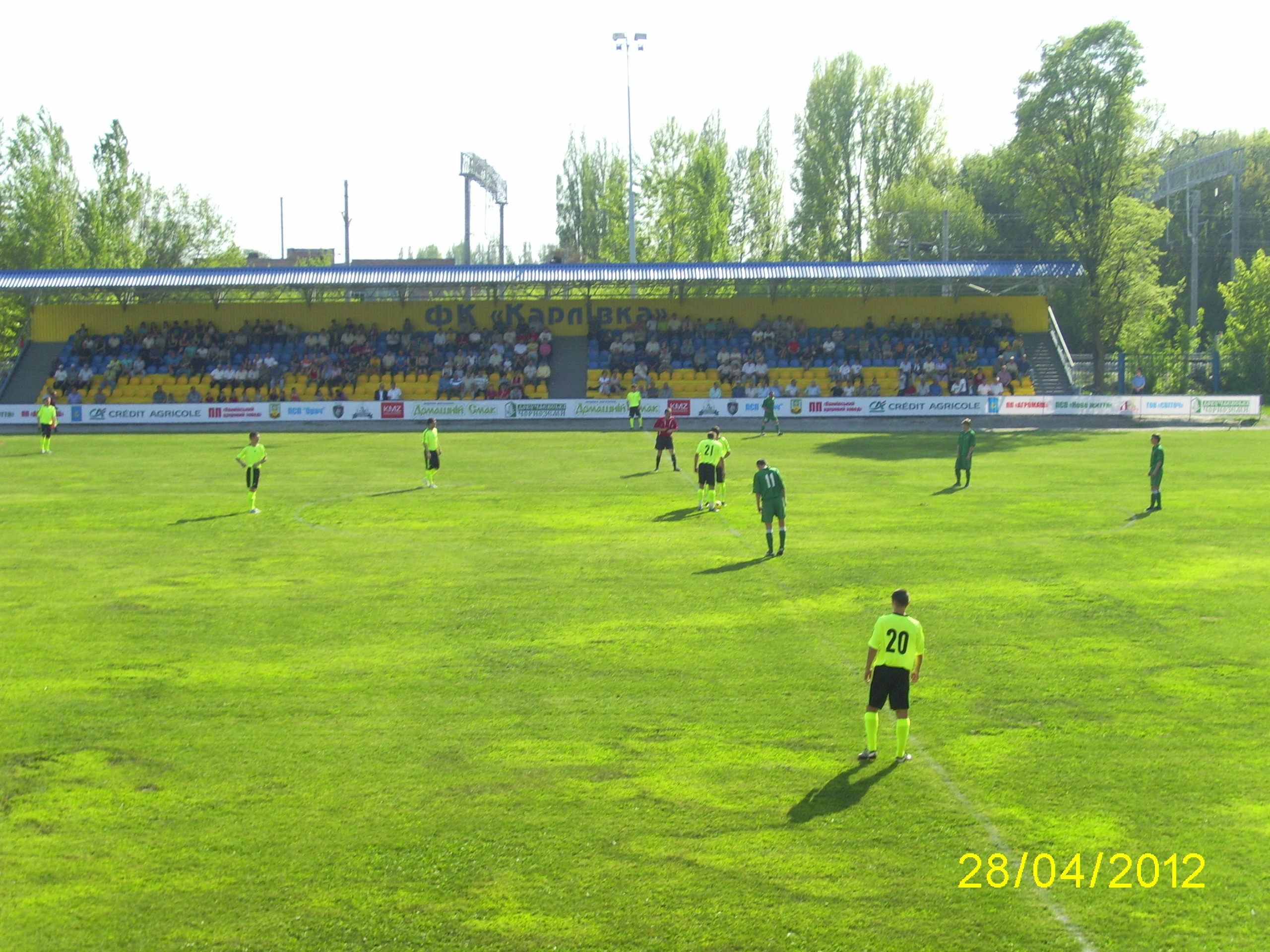
- Interactive map of Mashynobudivnyk Stadium
- Location: Karlivka, Ukraine
- Capacity: 1,300 (football)

Tenants
- FC Karlivka; FC Stal Alchevsk

Mashynobudivnyk Stadium (Ukrainian: Стадіон Машинобудівник) is a football stadium in Karlivka, Ukraine.
