= Cherkasy Oblast Football Association =

Cherkasy Oblast Football Association is a football governing body in the region of Cherkasy Oblast, Ukraine. The association is a collective member of the Ukrainian Association of Football.

Created in 1954 as part of the Soviet Ukraine, the region conducts its own football competitions including championship and cup competition. Before 1954, some teams competed and won football competitions of the Kyiv Oblast Football Association.

The region's main professional football team is FC Dnipro Cherkasy which throughout years several times has dissolved and later revived. The recent reorganization took place in 2018 and turned the club into Cherkashchyna–Akademiya. The club moved out of the city of Cherkasy to suburbs where is located its farm club. Beside Dnipro, Cherkasy Oblast also was represented at professional level by its regional titles record holder FC Lokomotyv Smila. Among other notable clubs in oblast there was Temp Cherkasy (played in 1970-80s) and FC LNZ-Lebedyn (near Shpola).

The region's main football arena is the Central City Stadium in Cherkasy, which was built in 1957 when the main football team obtain its status of team of masters (professional team).

== Previous Champions ==
- 1954 FC Torpedo Cherkasy
- 1955 FC Dynamo Cherkasy
- 1956 FC Kolhospnyk Cherkasy
- 1957 FC Kolhospnyk Cherkasy (2)
- 1958 Soviet Army Officers' Club (DOSA) Cherkasy
- 1959 FC Shakhtar Vatutine
- 1960 FC Spartak Uman
- 1961 FC Shakhtar Vatutine (2)
- 1962 FC Lokomotyv Zolotonosha
- 1963 FC Shakhtar Vatutine (3)
- 1964 FC Lokomotyv Smila
- 1965 FC Lokomotyv Smila (2)
- 1966 FC Lokomotyv Smila (3)
- 1967 FC Lokomotyv Smila (4)
- 1968 FC Lokomotyv Smila (5)
- 1969 FC Lokomotyv Smila (6)
- 1970 FC Lokomotyv Smila (7)
- 1971 FC Lokomotyv Smila (8)
- 1972 FC Fotoprylad Cherkasy
- 1973 FC Lokomotyv Smila (9)
- 1974 FC Lokomotyv Smila (10)
- 1975 FC Zorya Uman
- 1976 FC Khimik Cherkasy
- 1977 FC Khimik Cherkasy (2)
- 1978 FC Temp Cherkasy
- 1979 FC Temp Cherkasy (2)
- 1980 FC Avanhard Smila
- 1981 FC Traktor Chyhyryn
- 1982 FC Khimik Cherkasy
- 1983 FC Tiasmyn Smila
- 1984 FC Temp Cherkasy (3)
- 1985 FC Kolos Heronymivka
- 1986 FC Temp Cherkasy (4)
- 1987 FC Torpedo Cherkasy (2)
- 1988 FC Torpedo Cherkasy (3)
- 1989 FC Temp Korsun-Shevchenkivskyi
- 1990 FC Spartak Zolotonosha
- 1991 FC Kolos Heronymivka (2)
- =independence of Ukraine=
- 1992 FC Rotor Cherkasy
- 1993 FC Enerhetyk Chyhyryn
- 1994 FC Nyva-Naftovyk Korsun-Shevchenkivskyi
- 1995 FC Lokomotyv Smila (11)
- 1996 FC Nyva-Naftovyk Korsun-Shevchenkivskyi (2)
- 1997 FC Nyva Drabiv
- 1998 FC KKhP Talne
- 1999 FC Talne (2)
- 2000 FC Drabiv (2)
- 2001 FC Kolos Chornobai
- 2002 FC Kolos Chornobai (2)
- 2003 FC Kolos Chornobai (3)
- 2004 FC Nyva-Zlatokrai Zolotonosha Raion
- 2005 FC Khodak Cherkasy
- 2006 FC Khodak Cherkasy (2)
- 2007 FC Tiasmyn-Hazovyk Kamianka
- 2008 FC Khodak Cherkasy (3)
- 2009 FC Shpola-LNZ-Lebedyn
- 2010 FC Kholodnyi Yar Kamianka
- 2011 FC Shpola-LNZ-Lebedyn (2)
- 2012 FC Zorya Biloziria
- 2013 FC Zorya Biloziria (2)
- =Russo-Ukrainian War=
- 2014 FC Zorya Biloziria (3)
- 2015 UTK Yatran Palanka
- 2016 FC LNZ-Lebedyn (3)
- 2017 FC LNZ-Lebedyn (4)
- 2018 FC UTK Uman Raion (2)
- 2019 FC Altayir Drabiv
- 2020 FC Zlatokrai-2017 Zolotonosha Raion
- 2021 FC UTK Uman Raion (3)
- =full-scale Russian invasion=
- 2022 FC UTK Uman Raion (4)
- 2023 SC Profisport Zolotonosha
- 2024 FC Carbon Cherkasy
- 2025 FC Carbon Cherkasy (2)

=== Top winners ===
- 11 - FC Lokomotyv Smila
- 4 - 3 clubs (Temp, (Shpola)-LNZ-Lebedyn, UTK)
- 3 - 5 clubs (Shakhtar V., Torpedo Ch., Kolos Ch., Khodak Ch., Zorya)
- 2 - 7 clubs (Drabiv, Talne, Nyva-Naftovyk, Kolos H., Kolhospnyk, Khimik Ch., Carbon)
- 1 - 19 clubs

=== Cup winners ===
- 1954 FC Rafzavod Cherkasy
- 1955 FC Kharchovyk Smila
- 1956 FC Burevisnyk Cherkasy
- 1957 FC Kolhospnyk Cherkasy
- 1958 Soviet Army Officers' Club (DOSA) Cherkasy
- 1959 FC Spartak Shpola
- 1960 FC Harnizon Cherkasy
- 1961 FC Avanhard Smila
- 1962 FC Shakhtar Vatutine
- 1963 FC Avanhard Smila
- 1964 FC Shakhtar Vatutine
- 1965 FC Kharchovyk Smila
- 1966 FC Shakhtar Vatutine
- 1967 FC Lokomotyv Smila
- 1968 FC Avanhard Smila
- 1969 FC Lokomotyv Smila
- 1970 FC Khimik Cherkasy
- 1971 FC Avanhard Uman
- 1972 FC Lokomotyv Smila
- 1973 FC Lokomotyv Smila
- 1974 FC Fotoprylad Cherkasy
- 1975 FC Lokomotyv Smila
- 1976 FC Lokomotyv Smila
- 1977 FC Fotoprylad Cherkasy
- 1978 FC Khimik Cherkasy
- 1979 FC Tiasmyn Smila
- 1980 FC Khimik Cherkasy
- 1981 FC Tiasmyn Smila
- 1982 FC Tiasmyn Smila
- 1983 FC Tiasmyn Smila
- 1984 FC Tiasmyn Smila
- 1985 FC Kolos Heronymivka
- 1986 FC Kolos Heronymivka
- 1987 FC Temp Cherkasy
- 1988 FC Avanhard Smila
- 1989 FC Tiasmyn Smila
- 1990 FC Rotor Cherkasy
- 1991 FC Rotor Cherkasy
- 1992 FC Rotor Cherkasy
- 1993 FC Khimik Cherkasy
- 1994 FC Lokomotyv Smila
- 1995 FC Lokomotyv Smila
- 1996 FC Lokomotyv Smila
- 1997 FC KKhP Budivelnyk Talne
- 1998 FC Universytet-SDYuShOR Cherkasy
- 1999 FC Lokomotyv Smila
- 2000 FC Kolos Chornobai
- 2001 FC Ikar Uman Raion
- 2002 FC Yatran-Ikar Uman Raion
- 2003 FC Yatran Uman Raion
- 2004 FC Nyva-Zlatokrai Zolotonosha Raion
- 2005 FC Zlatokrai Zolotonosha Raion
- 2006 FC Avanhard Monastyryshche
- 2007 FC Khodak Cherkasy
- 2008 FC Kholodnyi Yar Kamianka
- 2009 FC Khodak Cherkasy
- 2010 FC Zorya Biloziria
- 2011 FC Umanfermash
- 2012 FC Zorya Biloziria
- 2013 FC Zorya Biloziria
- 2014 FC Zorya Biloziria
- 2015 FC Retro Vatutine
- 2016
- 2017

== Professional clubs ==
locations of all professional clubs and "teams of maters"
- FC Dnipro Cherkasy (Kolhospnyk, Hranit, Cherkasy), 1958-1971, 1974, 1977-1984, 1988-2002, 2003-2009, 2020-2022 (46 seasons)
  - Cherkasy-2, 2000-2001

- FC Lokomotyv Smila, 1996-1999 (3 seasons)
- FC Cherkashchyna (Slavutych Cherkasy, Cherkaskyi Dnipro), 2011-2021 (10 seasons)
- FC LNZ Cherkasy, 2021- (5 seasons)
- FC Carbon Cherkasy, 2026- (1 season)

== Other clubs at national/republican level ==
Note: the list includes clubs that played at republican competitions before 1959 and the amateur or KFK competitions after 1964. Until 1954, Cherkasy Oblast teams represented the Kyiv Oblast.

- (Uman, 1937, 1938)
- (Smila, 1938)
- (Pershyi Cherkaskyi, 1947)
- (Mashynobudivnyk Smila, 1948, 1949), 1981
- (DO Cherkasy, 1948, 1949)
- Torpedo Cherkasy, 1954
- Dnipro Cherkasy (Burevisnyk, Kolhospnyk, Hranit), 1955, 1956, 1957, 1973, 1976, 1985, 1986, 1987, 2003, 2019-20
- Shakhtar Vatutine, 1958, 1959, 1964, 1969
- Spartak Cherkasy, 1958
- Avanhard Uman, 1959, 1970
- Lokomotyv Smila, 1965 – 1968, 1971, 1972, 1975 – 1980, 1995-96
- Fotoprylad Cherkasy, 1972, 1975, 1977
- Zorya Uman, 1976, 1997-98
- Temp Cherkasy, 1980, 1987, 1988
- Tsukrovyk Horodyshche, 1981
- Prapor Chyhyryn, 1982
- Khimik Cherkasy, 1983
- Tiasmyn Smila, 1984, 1985, 1989, 1990
- Kolos Heronymivka, 1986 --> Dnipro Heronymivka (merger)
- Avanhard Smila, 1988
- Kolos Chornobai, 1988, 2000, 2002
- Rotor Cherkasy, 1989 – 1992-93
- Yatran Uman, 1990, 1993-94, 1994-95
- Nyva-Naftovyk Korsun-Shevchenkivskyi, 1990, 1994-95
- Spartak Zolotonosha, 1991, 1992-93
- Zirka Smila, 1997-98
- Rybka Cherkasy, 1997-98
- FC Drabiv, 2001
- DPA-TETs Cherkasy, 2003
- Illichivets Uman, 2005, 2006
- Slavutych Cherkasy (Khodak), 2006 – 2009, 2011
- Kholodnyi Yar Kamianka, 2008
- Retro Vatutine, 2012 – 2014
- Zoria Biloziria, 2013, 2014
- LNZ Lebedyn, 2018-19 – 2020-21

Cities' appearances: Uman (1937), Smila (1938), Cherkasy (1947), Vatutine (1958), Horodyshche (1981), Chyhyryn (1982), Heronymivka (1986), Chernobai (1988), Korsun-Shevchenkivskyi (1990), Zolotonosha (1991), Drabiv (2001), Kamianka (2008), Biloziria (2013), Lebedyn (2018)

== See also ==
- FFU Council of Regions
