= Volodymyr Makar =

Ukrainian footballer

Personal information
- Full name: Volodymyr Pavlovych Makar
- Date of birth: 22 January 1990 (age 36)
- Place of birth: Naraiv, Ternopil Oblast, Ukrainian SSR
- Height: 1.73 m (5 ft 8 in)
- Position: Midfielder

Youth career
- 2004–2006: Karpaty Lviv
- 2007: FC Pokrova Lviv

Senior career*
Years	Team	Apps	(Gls)
2008–2010	Lviv	0	(0)
2009–2010	→ Lviv-2	18	(0)
2010–2018	Rukh Vynnyky	164	(31)
Total		182	(31)
- * Club domestic league appearances and goals as of 27 December 2018

Volodymyr Makar (Ukrainian: Володимир Павлович Макар; born 22 January 1990) is a retired professional Ukrainian football midfielder who played for FC Rukh Vynnyky in the Ukrainian First League.

== Career ==
Makar is a product of the different youth sportive schools. His first trainer was Roman Hdanskyi.

He played one season in the Ukrainian Premier League Reserves club FC Lviv. And in 2010 Makar was signed by amateurs team FC Rukh Vynnyky. He was promoted, together with the team, to the Ukrainian Second League and the Ukrainian First League subsequently.
