= SC Enerhiya Mykolaiv =

Enerhiya Mykolaiv
- Full name: Sports Club Enerhiya Mykolaiv
- Founded: 21 December 2011
- Dissolved: 2014
- Ground: City Stadium, Pervomaisk
- Chairman: Yuriy Antoshenko
- Manager: Viacheslav Mazarati
- League: Ukrainian Second League
- 2013–14: 17th
Home colours	Away colours

SC Enerhiya Mykolaiv was a Ukrainian professional football club based in Mykolaiv. The club competed for one season (2013–14) and withdrew from the PFL.

== History ==
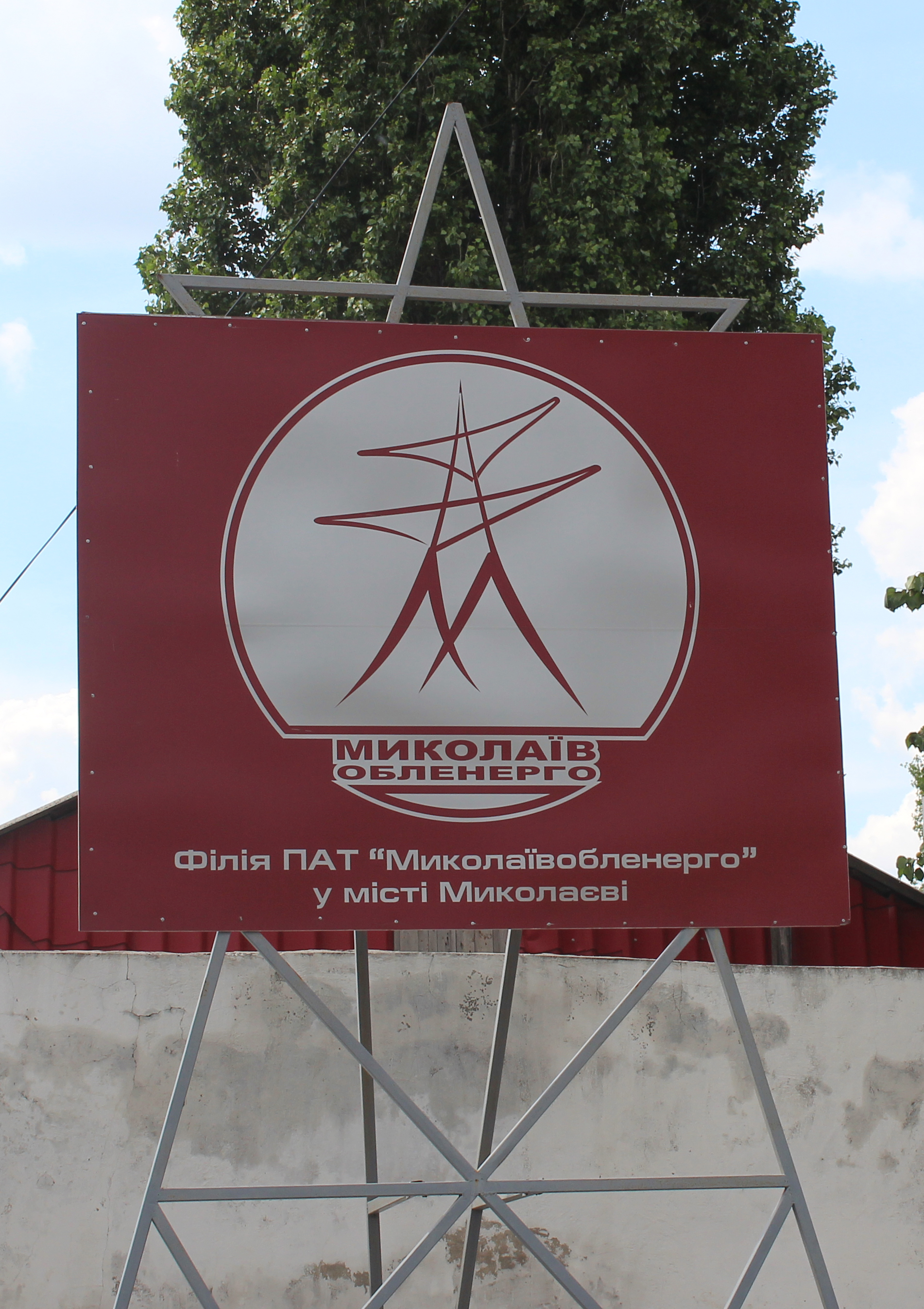
Emblem of the club's sponsor

In 2011, at the initiative of the Director General of the regional energy company Mykolaivoblenerho Yuriy Antoshenko it was decided to hold the "Day of Energy" mini-football tournament for all branches of the company. The internal football championship was held on 3 December 2011. The tournament attracted the participation of 22 teams of its various units. After the final match, Yuriy Antoshenko told reporters that within Mykolaivoblenerho a football team will be created that will take part in regional competitions.

The club's first match was on 25 December 2011 when they participated in Mykolaiv oblast winter championship with a landslide victory with a 4–0 victory over rivals Torpedo-95 Mykolaiv. The club were successful in oblast championship finishing first in 2012 and in the winter championship of 2013.

The team entered the 2013 Ukrainian Amateur competition and competed in Group 4.

The team applied to PFL and attestation has been accepted for the 2013–14 Ukrainian Second League season.

On 6 March 2014 the administration of Enerhiya Mykolaiv informed that the club would not be funded by MykolaivOblEnerho hence leaving the club defunct. All of their matches after Round 23 are considered technical losses. The club played twenty two matches in the League and had a record of 9 wins, 3 draws and 15 losses (including a technical loss) with 24 goals scored and 28 allowed.

== Honours ==
- Mykolaiv Oblast Championship
  - Winners (1): 2012
- Mykolaiv Oblast Winter Championship
  - Winners (2): 2011–12, 2012–13

== League and cup history ==
Season	Div.	Pos.	Pl.	W	D	L	GS	GA	P	Domestic Cup	Europe	Notes
2013	4th	2	10	6	1	3	17	5	19			
2013–14	3rd	17	36	9	3	24	24	28	30	1/16 finals		Withdrew

== Gallery ==
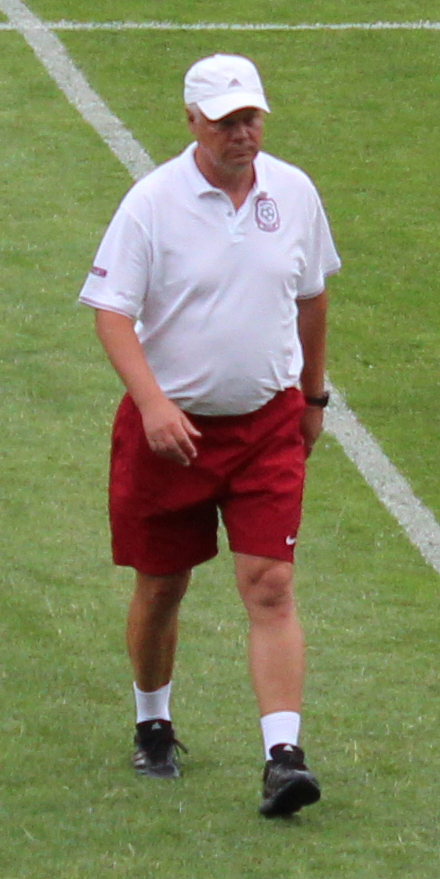
Club's head coach Vyacheslav Mazarati

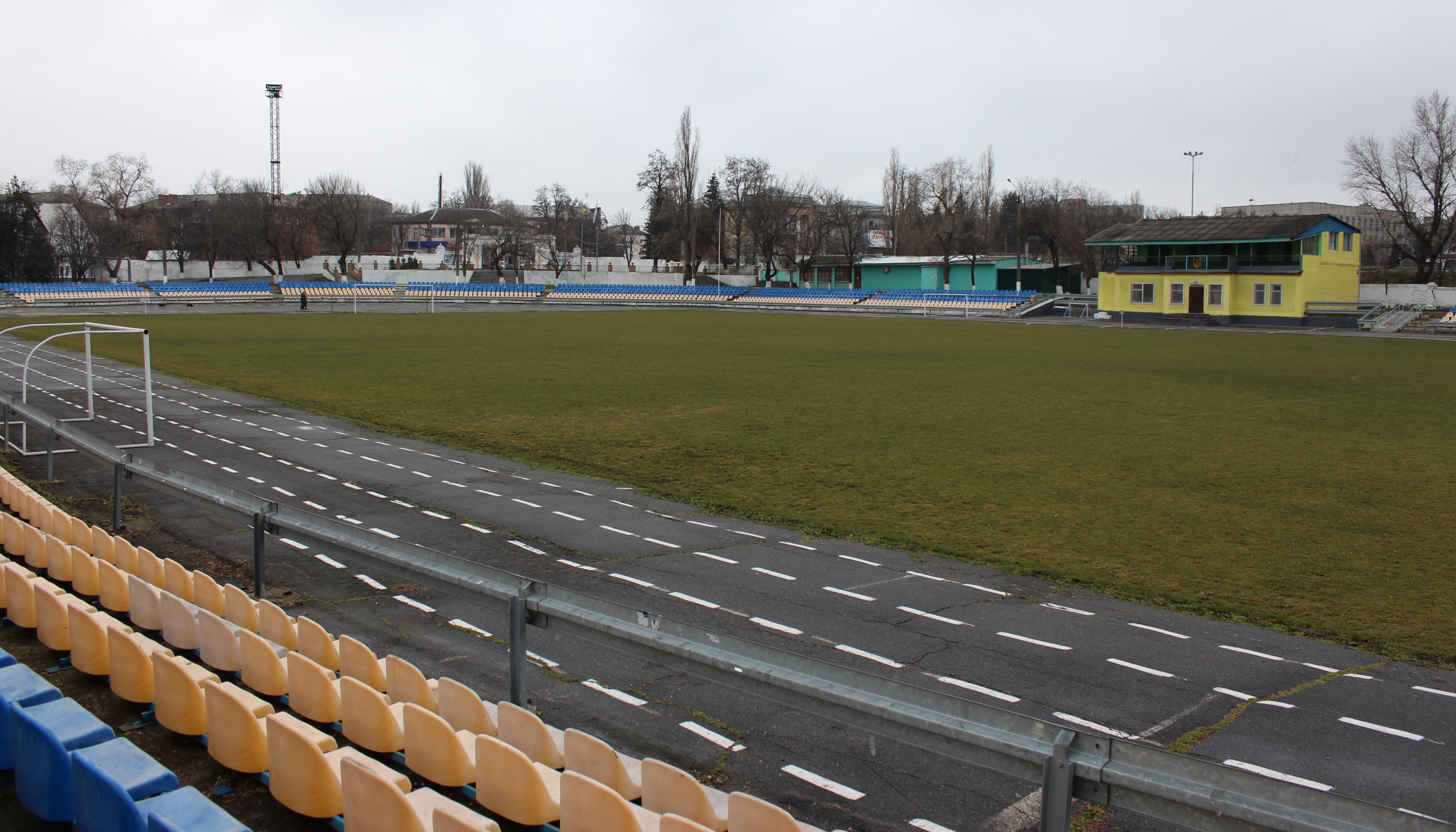
City Stadium in Pervomaisk, the club's home field in Druha Liha
