= Karlivka =

City in Poltava Oblast, Ukraine

Karlivka Карлівка
- City
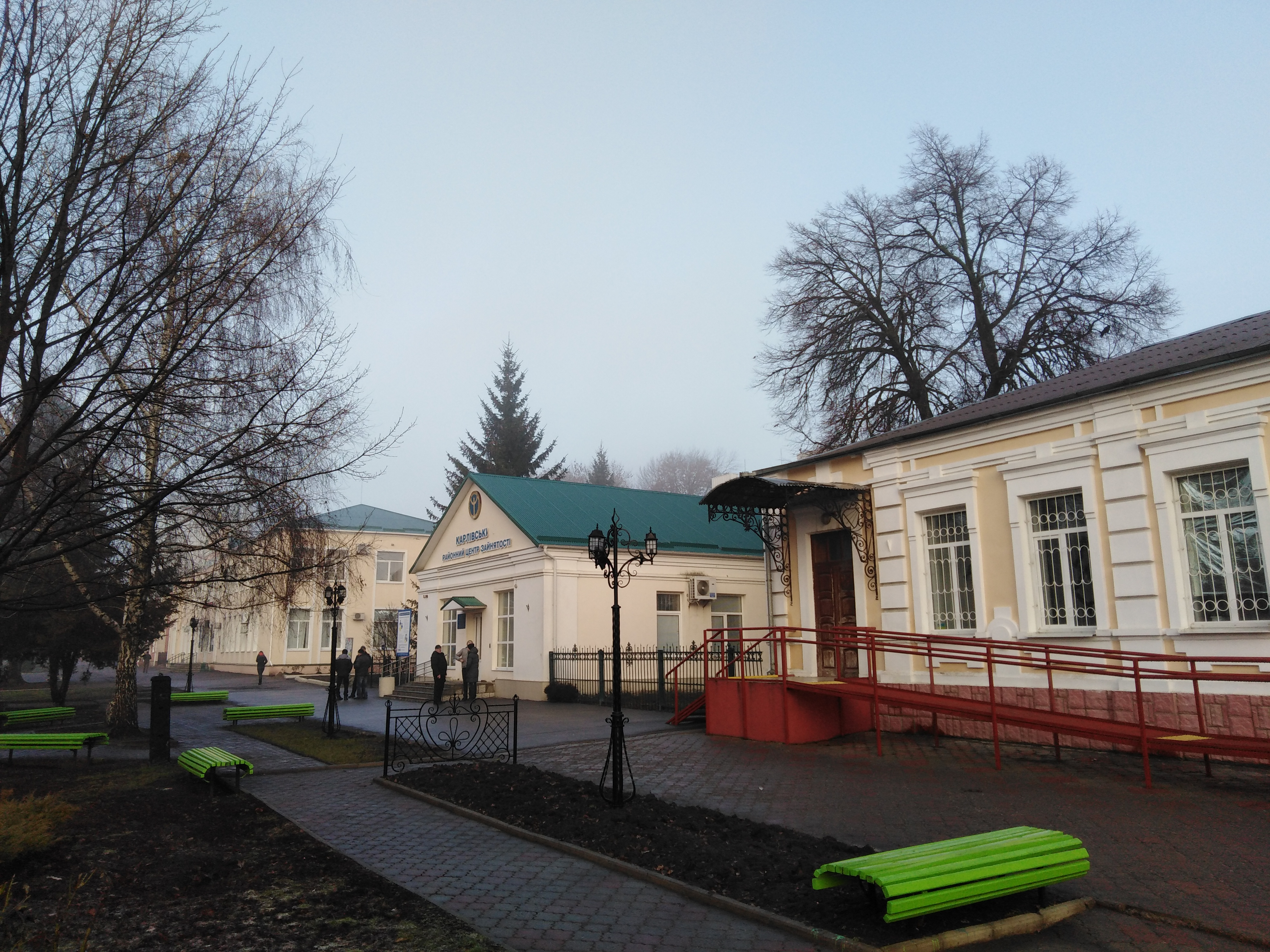
- Employment agency on Poltavskyi Shliakh Street

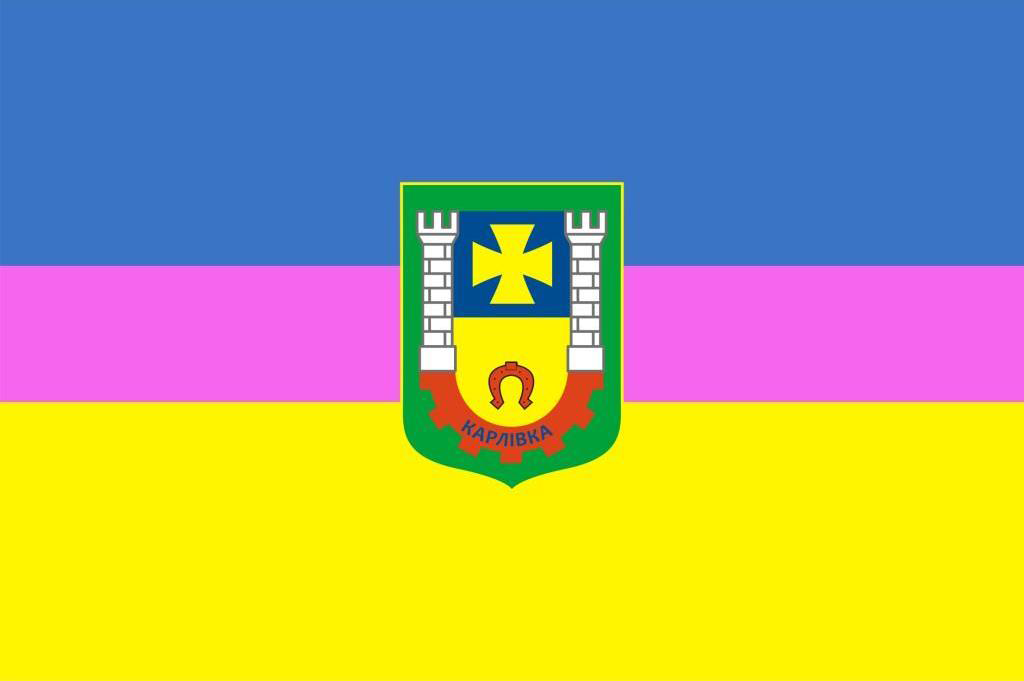
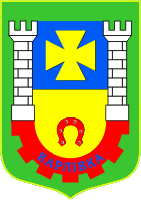
- Flag Coat of arms
- Interactive map of Karlivka
- Location within Ukraine Location within Poltava Oblast
- Country: Ukraine
- Oblast: Poltava Oblast
- Raion: Poltava Raion
- Hromada: Karlivka urban hromada

Population (2022)
  - Total: ▲14,045
  - Estimate (2025): ▼15,525

Karlivka (Ukrainian: Карлівка, IPA: [ˈkɑrl⁽ʲ⁾iu̯kɐ]) is a city in Poltava Raion, Poltava Oblast, Ukraine. It hosts the administration of Karlivka urban hromada, one of the hromadas of Ukraine. Population: 14,045 (2022 estimate).

== History ==
First settlers from the right bank of Dnieper arrived on the site of modern Karlivka in the 1670s, founding the settlement of Orchyk, which was part of the first Poltava sotnia of the Poltava Regiment. In the first quarter of the 18th century, the lands of the Poltava Regiment between the Kolomak and Orchyk rivers were given to the general of the Russian army Johann Bernhard Weissbach. After Weisbach's death in 1735, Karlivka was gifted to Field marshal Minikh, who named the settlement Minikhpol.

In 1812 a manor was constructed in Karlivka by its then owner Lev Razumovsky, son of the last Ukrainian hetman Kyrylo Rozumovsky. Later the town came in possession of Grand Duchess Elena Pavlovna of Russia and was inherited by her descendants from the Russian imperial family. Between 1899 Fedir Petliura, elder brother of Ukrainian political leader Symon Petliura, taught at the local school.

Before the World War II, Karlivka had more than 10,000 inhabitants and was classified as an urban-type settlement. A hospital, a polyclinic, a high school, and a factory training school operated in the village. Karlivka was granted city status on 13 April 1957.

Until 18 July 2020, Karlivka was the administrative center of Karlivka Raion. The raion was abolished in July 2020 as part of the administrative reform of Ukraine, which reduced the number of raions of Poltava Oblast to four. The area of Karlivka Raion was merged into Poltava Raion.

== Demographics ==
As of the Ukrainian national census in 2001, Karlivka had a population of 17,849 inhabitants. The ethnic composition of the population was as follows:

Ethnic groups in Karlivka
	percent
Ukrainians	94.45%
Russians	4.55%
Belarusians	0.44%
Armenians	0.12%
others	0.44%

== Economics ==
The economy of the city dominated by industrial and agricultural production. A number of industrial enterprises operates in the city, including Karlivka Machine-Building Plant, a mechanical factory, an alcohol plant, a furniture factory, a bakery, oil and gas deep drilling management expedition, a number of farms, ATP-15340 motor transport enterprise, and 4 repair and construction companies. Karlivsky Sugar Factory ceased operations in 2014 and was judicially liquidated in 2017.

In April 2019, the construction of a cooperative factory of the Association of Milk Producers began, with 10 participants being the founders, and it is planned to be put into operation at the end of 2021. The first stage of the plant will allow processing approximately 500 tons of extra-class milk daily. Further capacity of the plant will be increased to 1000 tons.

== Gallery ==
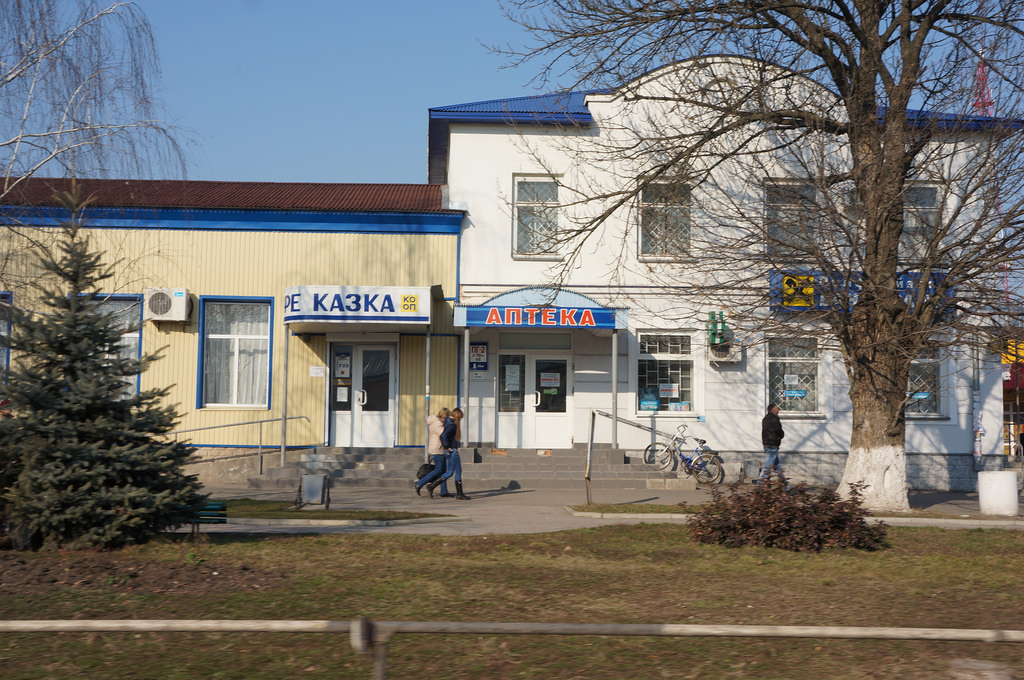
Central part of Karlivka

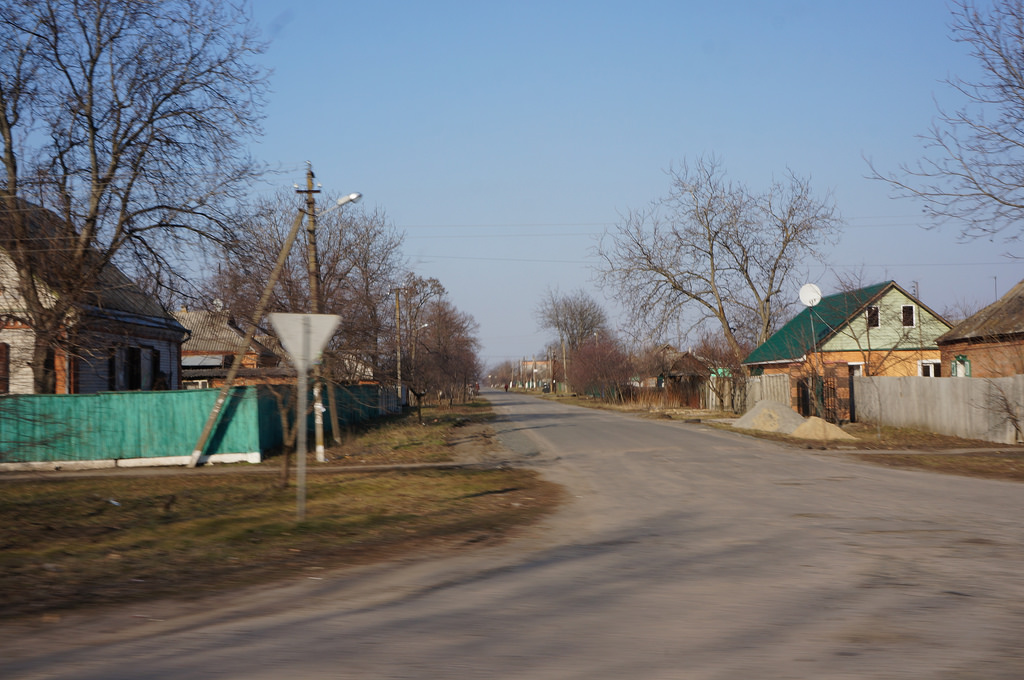
A residental street in Karlivka

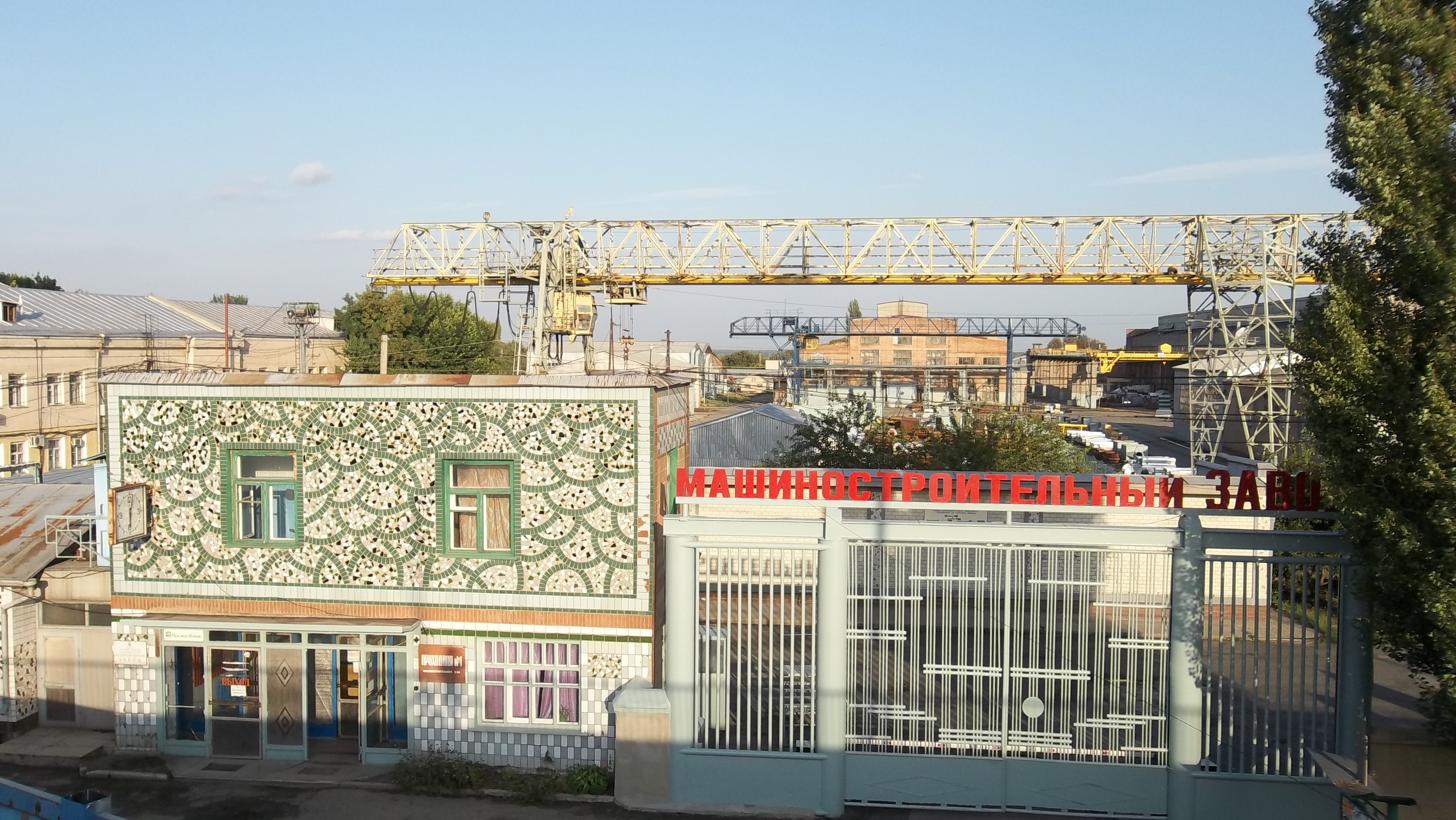
Karlivka Machine-Building Plant

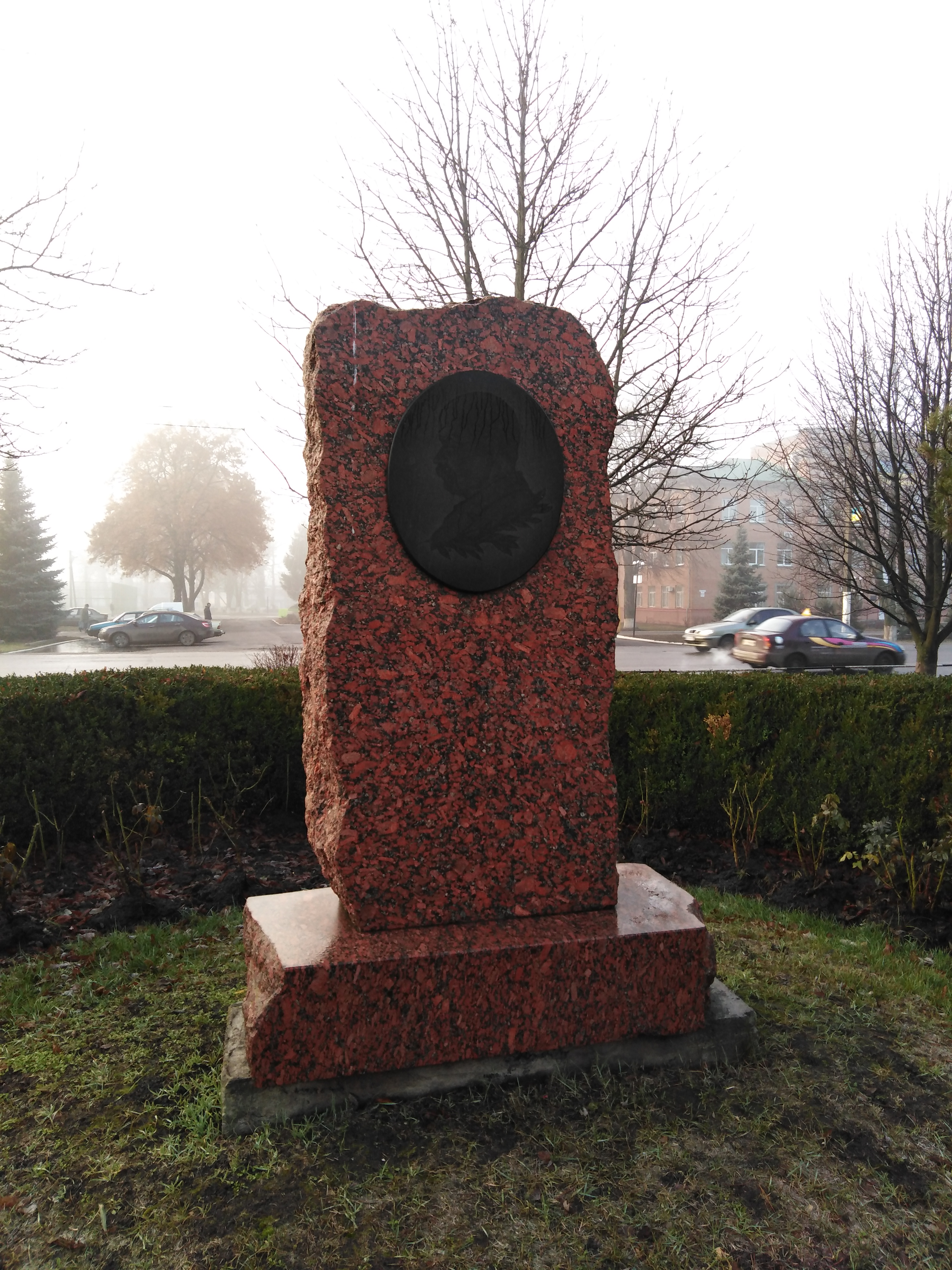
Monument to Taras Shevchenko

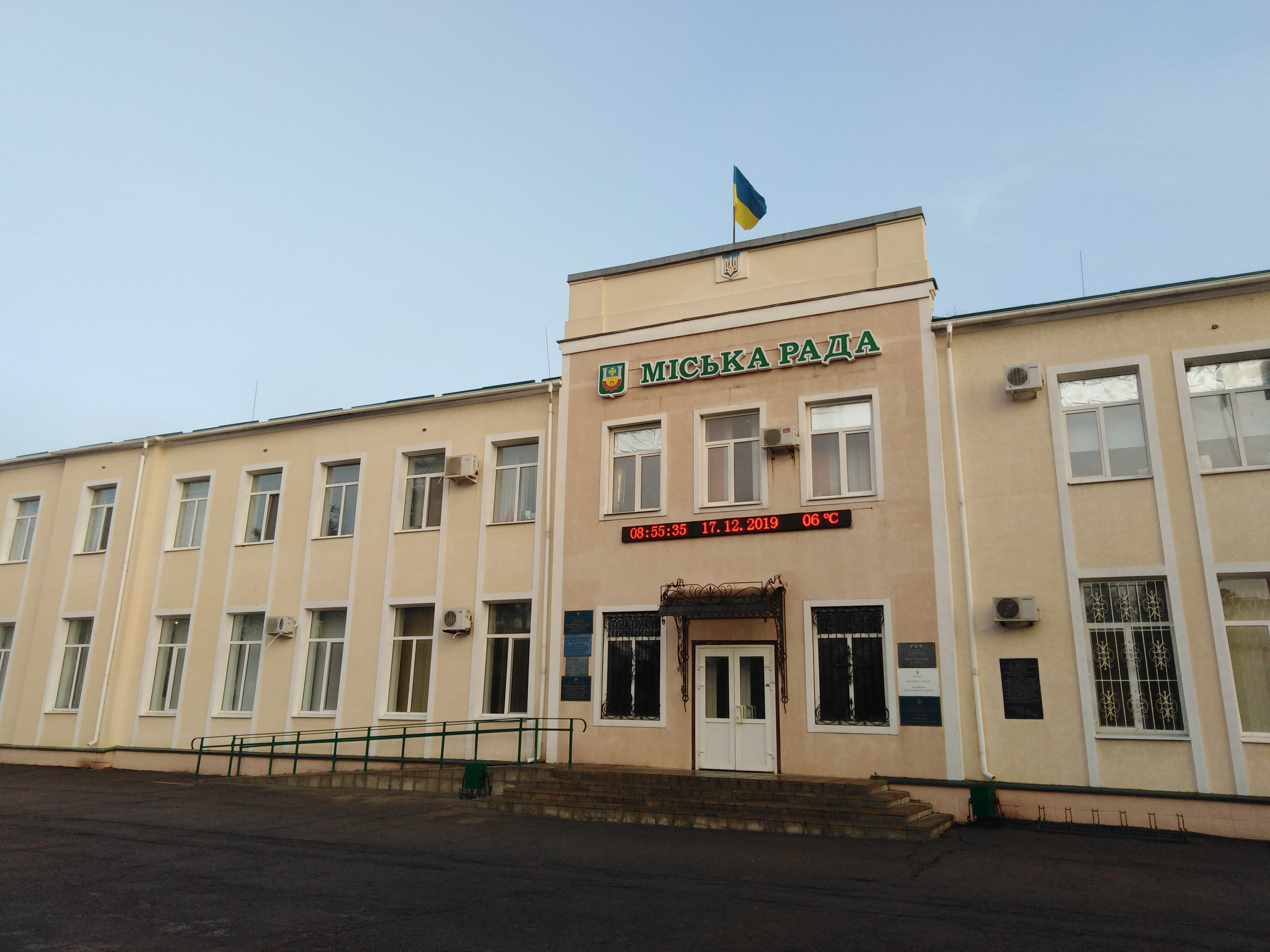
City Council

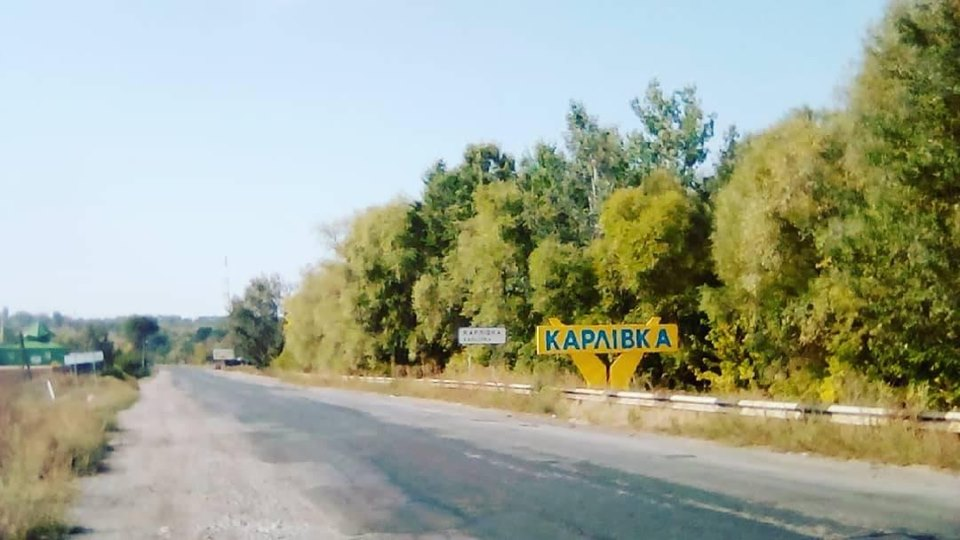
Welcome sign on the entrance to the city

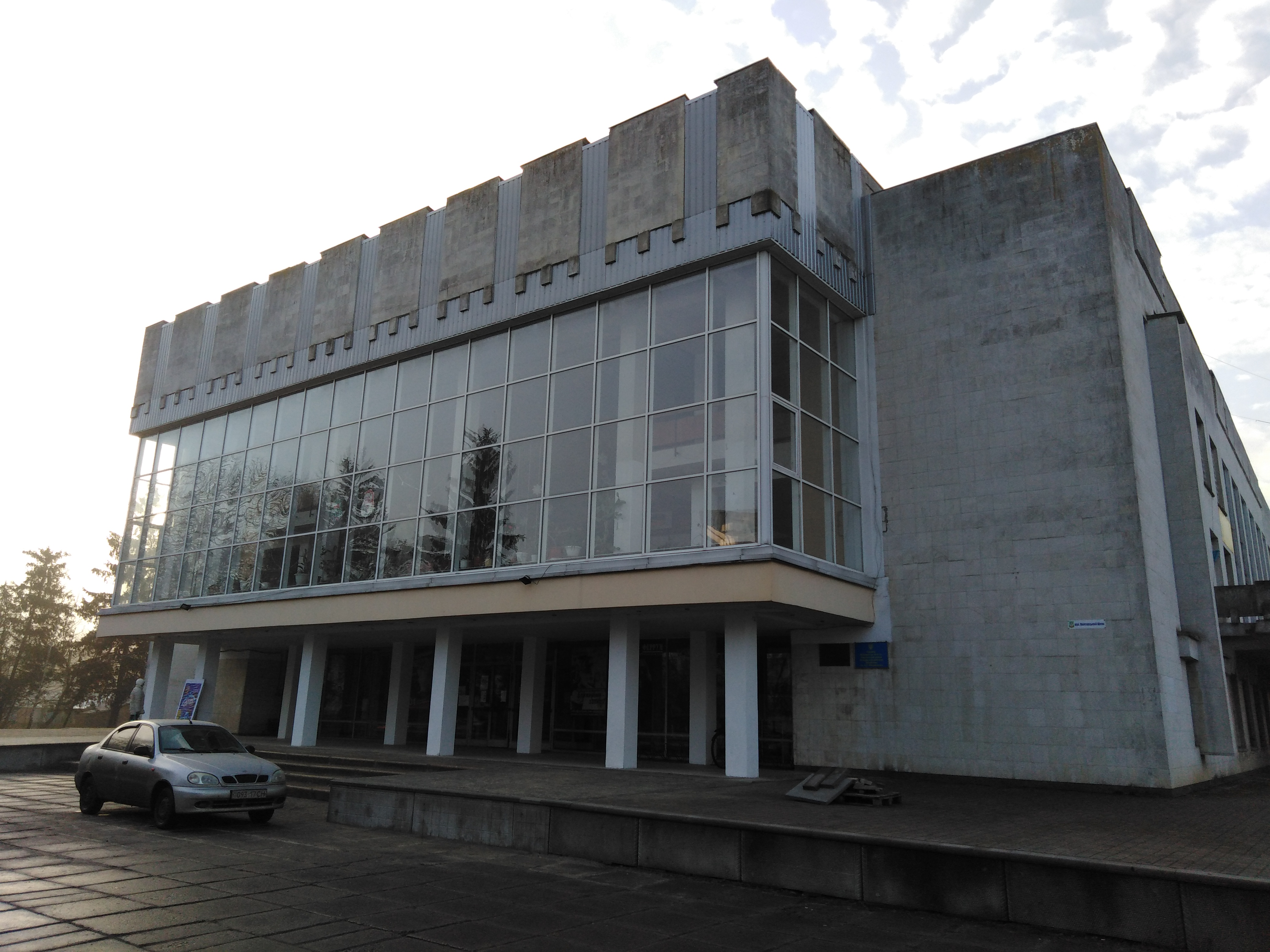
House of Culture

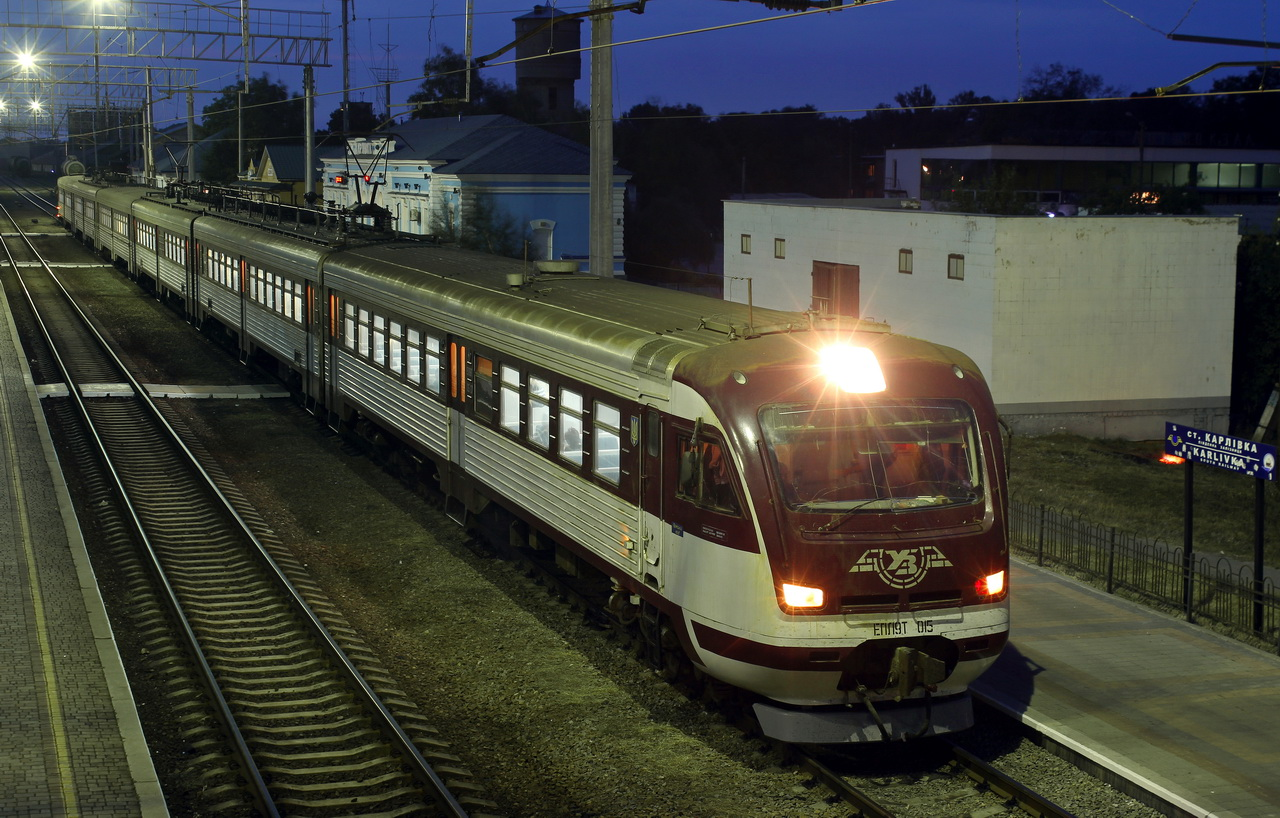
Railway station

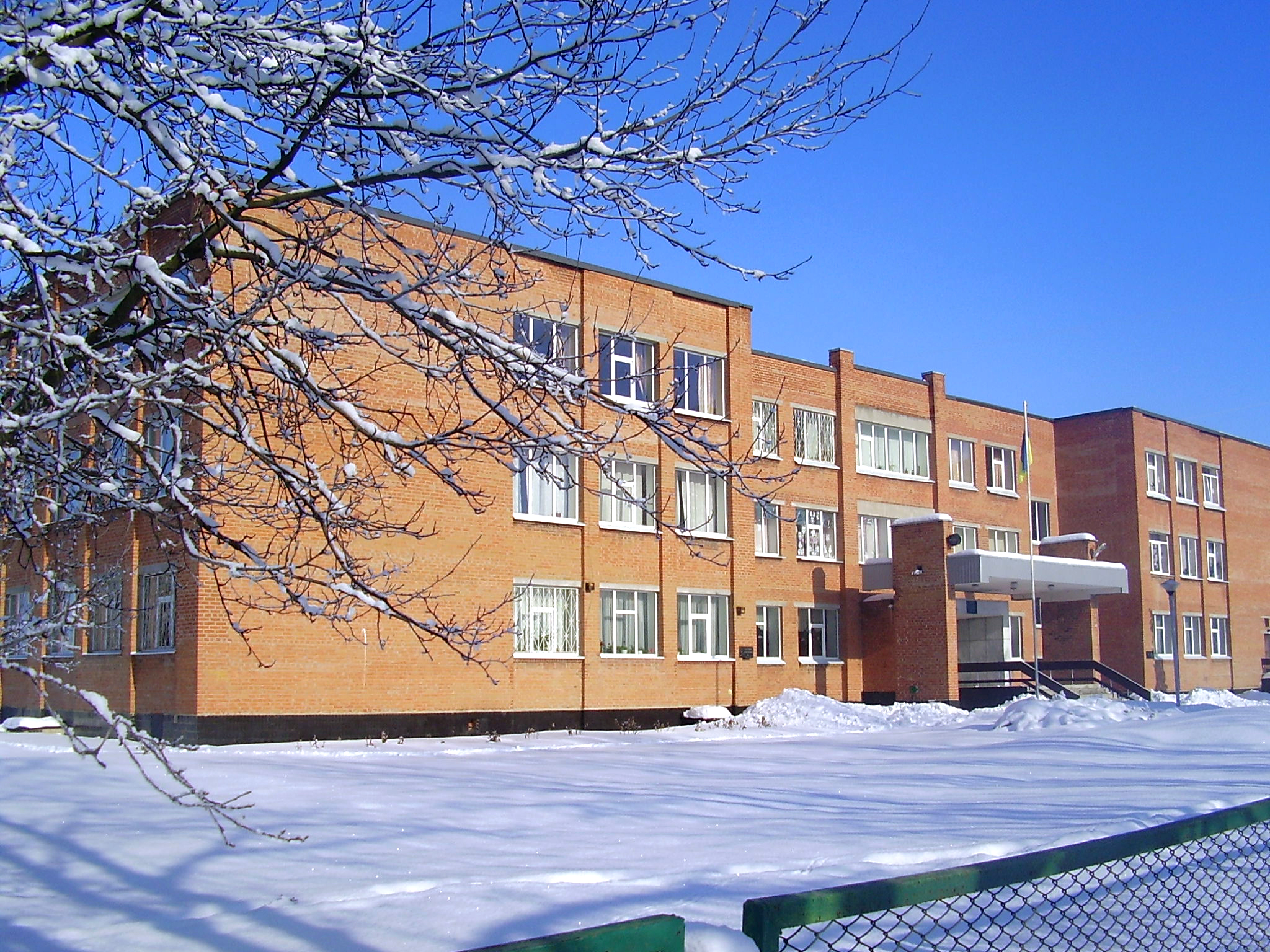
Nina Herasimenko Lyceum

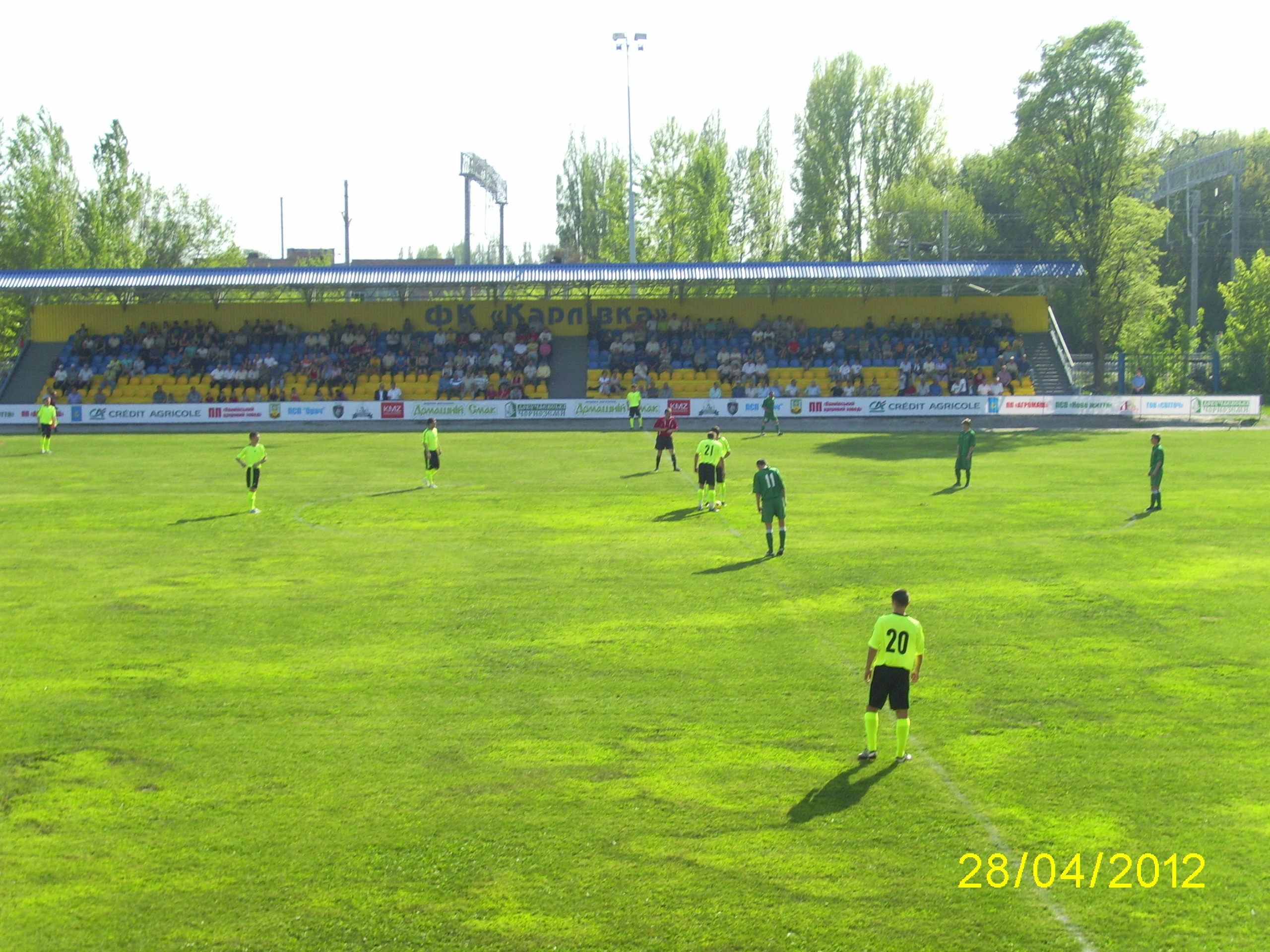
Mashynobudivnyk Stadium

== Education ==
- Karlivka Nina Herasimenko Lyceum
- School №1
- School №3
- School №4
- House of children's and youth creativity
- School of Arts
- Karlivka Vocational School
- Central District Hospital
- House of Culture
- Museum

== Notable people ==
- Trofim Lysenko (1898–1976), Soviet Ukrainian agrobiologist, promoter of the pseudoscientific agricultural and heritability of acquired characteristics theories termed Lysenkoism, which was official Soviet policy
- Nikolai Podgorny (1903–1983), Soviet politician, Chairman of the Presidium of the Supreme Soviet (1965–1977)
- Mikhail Krichevsky (1897–2008), last surviving Russian Army veteran of the First World War

== See also ==
- Karlivka (disambiguation)
