= FC Vinnytsia =

Vinnytsia
- Founded: 2010
- League: Amateur Championship
Home colours	Away colours

FC Vinnytsia is a Ukrainian amateur football team from Vinnytsia. The club competes in the Amateur Championship since 2013.

== History ==
The club was founded in 2010 as FC Derzhsluzhbovets-KFKS Vinnytsia and competed in regional competitions of Vinnytsia Oblast.

In 2012 the club changed its name to FC Vinnytsia and in 2013 entered the national amateur competitions.

== League and cup history ==
Season	Div.	Pos.	Pl.	W	D	L	GS	GA	P	Amateur Cup	Europe	Notes
2013	4th	4	10	3	2	5	12	15	11			
2014	4th	3	8	4	2	2	10	6	14			
