= 2026–27 in Ukrainian football =

Football in Ukraine
- Season: 2026–27

Men's football
- Super Cup: not held

The 2026–27 season is the 36th season of competitive association football in Ukraine since the dissolution of the Soviet Union.

With the continuation of the Russo-Ukrainian War, the Ukrainian Association of Football (UAF) decided to go forward with the continuation of another season. The UAF approved round-robin tournaments in all national league competitions under strict safety precautions.

== National teams ==
=== Ukraine national football team ===
==== 2026–27 UEFA Nations League ====
===== UEFA Nations League B =====
Pos	Team	Pld	W	D	L	GF	GA	GD	Pts	Promotion or qualification	(Northern Ireland)	(Hungary)	(Ukraine)	(Georgia (country))
1	Northern Ireland (X)	4	2	2	0	4	0	+4	8	Promotion to League A	—	0–0	14 Nov	0–0
2	Hungary	4	2	1	1	3	2	+1	7	Qualification for promotion play-offs	17 Nov	—	0–1	1–0
3	Ukraine	4	1	1	2	2	5	−3	4		0–3	1–2	—	17 Nov
4	Georgia (Y)	4	0	2	2	0	2	−2	2	Qualification for relegation play-offs	0–1	14 Nov	0–0	—

Updated to match(es) played on 5 October 2026. Source: UEFA
(X) Safe from relegation; (Y) Can at best reach promotion play-offs

=== Ukraine women's national football team ===
==== 2027 FIFA Women's World Cup ====
===== Group A3 =====
Pos	Team	Pld	W	D	L	GF	GA	GD	Pts	Qualification or relegation	(Spain)	(England)	(Iceland)	(Ukraine)
1	Spain	6	5	0	1	21	3	+18	15	Qualification to 2027 FIFA Women's World Cup	—	4–0	3–0	5–0
2	England	6	5	0	1	13	5	+8	15	Advance to play-offs	1–0	—	2–0	3–0
3	Iceland	6	2	0	4	3	12	−9	6	Advance to play-offs	1–6	0–1	—	1–0
4	Ukraine (R)	6	0	0	6	2	19	−17	0	Advance to play-offs and relegation to League B	1–3	1–6	0–1	—

Source: UEFA
(R) Relegated

===== Path 2 play-offs =====
Round 1

Team 1	Agg.	Team 2	1st leg	2nd leg
Slovakia	1–4	Ukraine	1–3	0–1

Round 2

Team 1	Agg.	Team 2	1st leg	2nd leg
Ukraine		England	26 Nov	5 Dec

Round 1
Tie 11
Slovakia	1	0	1
Ukraine	3	1	4
Tie 3
Greece	1	0	1
England	3	5	8

Round 2
Ukraine
England

== UEFA competitions ==
2025–26 season (UEFA competitions)
- Men's teams in Europe
- Shakhtar Donetsk (UCL); Dynamo Kyiv (UEL); LNZ Cherkasy (UECL); Polissya Zhytomyr (UECL)
- Women's teams in Europe
- Kharkiv (UWCL); Seasters Odesa (UWCL); Kolos Kovalivka (UWEC)

=== UEFA Champions League ===
==== League stage ====
Pos	Team	Pld	W	D	L	GF	GA	GD	Pts	Qualification
15	(Italy) Roma	3	1	1	1	8	5	+3	4	Advance to knockout phase play-offs (seeded)
16	(Spain) Atlético Madrid	3	1	1	1	4	3	+1	4	Advance to knockout phase play-offs (seeded)
17	(Ukraine) Shakhtar Donetsk	3	1	1	1	4	3	+1	4	Advance to knockout phase play-offs (unseeded)
18	(Netherlands) PSV Eindhoven	3	1	1	1	2	2	0	4	Advance to knockout phase play-offs (unseeded)
19	(Spain) Villarreal	3	1	0	2	8	8	0	3	Advance to knockout phase play-offs (unseeded)

Updated to match(es) played on 21 October 2026. Source: UEFA
Rules for classification: League phase tiebreakers

Home team	Score	Away team
PSV Eindhoven (Netherlands)	1–1	(Ukraine) Shakhtar Donetsk
Shakhtar Donetsk (Ukraine)	3–1	(Greece) AEK Athens
Inter Milan (Italy)	21 Oct	(Ukraine) Shakhtar Donetsk
Shakhtar Donetsk (Ukraine)	3 Nov	(Portugal) Sporting CP
Shakhtar Donetsk (Ukraine)	25 Nov	(Turkey) Fenerbahçe
Slovan Bratislava (Slovakia)	9 Dec	(Ukraine) Shakhtar Donetsk
RB Leipzig (Germany)	20 Jan	(Ukraine) Shakhtar Donetsk
Shakhtar Donetsk (Ukraine)	27 Jan	(Spain) Real Madrid

=== UEFA Europa League ===
==== Qualifying phase and play-off round ====
===== First qualifying round =====
First qualifying round
Team 1	Agg.	Team 2	1st leg	2nd leg
Dynamo Kyiv (Ukraine)	0–0 (4–2 p)	(Romania) Universitatea Cluj	0–0	0–0 (a.e.t.)

===== Second qualifying round =====
Second qualifying round
Team 1	Agg.	Team 2	1st leg	2nd leg
Dynamo Kyiv (Ukraine)	2–5	(Greece) PAOK	2–3	0–2

=== UEFA Conference League ===
==== Qualifying phase and play-off round ====
===== Second qualifying round =====
Second qualifying round
Team 1	Agg.	Team 2	1st leg	2nd leg
Polissya Zhytomyr (Ukraine)	4–5	(Denmark) Copenhagen	3–3	1–2
LNZ Cherkasy (Ukraine)	0–0 (2–4 p)	(Belgium) Gent	0–0	0–0 (a.e.t.)

===== Third qualifying round =====
Third qualifying round
Team 1	Agg.	Team 2	1st leg	2nd leg
Dynamo Kyiv (Ukraine)	1–2	(Azerbaijan) Qarabağ	1–0	0–2

=== UEFA Women's Champions League ===
==== Qualifying rounds ====
===== Round 2 =====
====== Champions Path ======
Tournament 5

Hosted by OH Leuven.

Semi-finals
5 August
(Ukraine) Metalist 1925 Kharkiv	1
(Turkey) Fenerbahçe	2
5 August
(Belgium) OH Leuven	4
(Serbia) TSC Bačka Topola	0

Final
8 August
(Belgium) OH Leuven (p)	1 (4)
(Turkey) Fenerbahçe	1 (2)
Third place
8 August
(Ukraine) Metalist 1925 Kharkiv (a.e.t.)	3
(Serbia) TSC Bačka Topola	2

====== League Path ======
Tournament 4

Hosted by St. Pölten.

Semi-finals
5 August
(Portugal) Sporting CP	5
(Ukraine) SeaSters Odesa	0
5 August
(Austria) St. Pölten	4
(Switzerland) Young Boys	3

Final
8 August
(Austria) St. Pölten (p)	1 (4)
(Portugal) Sporting CP	1 (1)
Third place
8 August
(Switzerland) Young Boys	1
(Ukraine) SeaSters Odesa	3

=== UEFA Women's Europa Cup ===
==== Qualifying rounds ====
===== Round 1 =====
First Qualifying Round
Team 1	Agg.	Team 2	1st leg	2nd leg
Mitrovica (Kosovo)	0–5	(Ukraine) Metalist 1925 Kharkiv	0–0	0–5
Torreense (Portugal)	9–2	(Ukraine) Kolos Kovalivka	6–1	3–1
SeaSters Odesa (Ukraine)	1–3	(Norway) Rosenborg	1–0	0–3

===== Round 2 =====
Second qualifying round
Team 1	Agg.	Team 2	1st leg	2nd leg
Metalist 1925 Kharkiv (Ukraine)	2–6	(Portugal) Torreense	1–2	1–4

== Men's club football ==
League		Promoted to league	Relegated from league
Premier League		Bukovyna Chernivtsi; Chornomorets Odesa; Livyi Bereh Kyiv	Rukh Lviv; Oleksandriya; Poltava
PFL League 1		Kulykiv-Bilka; Lokomotyv Kyiv; Kolos-2 Kovalivka; Polissya-2 Zhytomyr	Podillya Khmelnytskyi; Metalurh Zaporizhia; ~~Vorskla Poltava~~
PFL League 2	Groups		
PFL League 2	A	Bratslav Vinnytsia; Dnister Zalishchyky	Real Pharma Odesa; ~~Bukovyna-2 Chernivtsi~~; ~~Chaika Petropavlivska Borshchahivka~~; ~~Chornomorets-2 Odesa~~; ~~Hirnyk-Sport Horishni Plavni~~; ~~Lisne~~; ~~Livyi Bereh-2 Kyiv~~; ~~Uzhhorod~~
PFL League 2	B	Avanhard Lozova; Carbon Cherkasy; Poltava-2	Real Pharma Odesa; ~~Bukovyna-2 Chernivtsi~~; ~~Chaika Petropavlivska Borshchahivka~~; ~~Chornomorets-2 Odesa~~; ~~Hirnyk-Sport Horishni Plavni~~; ~~Lisne~~; ~~Livyi Bereh-2 Kyiv~~; ~~Uzhhorod~~

Note: For all scratched clubs, see section Clubs removed for more details.

=== Premier League ===
Pos	Team	Pld	W	D	L	GF	GA	GD	Pts	Qualification or relegation
1	Shakhtar Donetsk	9	8	0	1	20	5	+15	24	Qualification for the Champions League second qualifying round
2	Polissya Zhytomyr	9	7	1	1	20	8	+12	22	Qualification for the Conference League second qualifying round
3	Kharkiv	8	6	0	2	16	6	+10	18	Qualification for the Conference League second qualifying round
4	Dynamo Kyiv	8	5	1	2	11	8	+3	16	
5	Karpaty Lviv	9	4	3	2	17	8	+9	15	
6	LNZ Cherkasy	9	4	2	3	10	9	+1	14	
7	Zorya Luhansk	9	4	2	3	12	13	−1	14	
8	Epitsentr Kamianets-Podilskyi	9	2	3	4	9	12	−3	9	
9	Veres Rivne	9	2	3	4	6	11	−5	9	
10	Kolos Kovalivka	8	2	2	4	10	13	−3	8	
11	Bukovyna Chernivtsi	9	1	5	3	7	12	−5	8	
12	Livyi Bereh Kyiv	8	1	4	3	6	8	−2	7	
13	Obolon Kyiv	8	1	4	3	4	12	−8	7	Qualification for the Relegation play-off
14	Chornomorets Odesa	8	1	2	5	5	11	−6	5 (Note: Ranked on head-to-head points (goal difference, goals scored): Chornomorets Odesa 3(1-0=+1), Kudrivka 0(0-0=0), Kryvbas Kryvyi Rih 0(0-1=-1))	Qualification for the Relegation play-off
15	Kudrivka	9	1	2	6	10	21	−11	5	Relegation to Ukrainian First League
16	Kryvbas Kryvyi Rih	7	1	2	4	7	13	−6	5	Relegation to Ukrainian First League

Updated to match(es) played on 19 October 2026. Source: upl.ua
Rules for classification: 1) Points; 2) Head-to-head points; 3) Head-to-head goal difference; 4) Head-to-head goals scored; 5) Goal difference; 6) Goals scored; 7) Draw or "Golden match" if two teams are tied for title (Article 22, paragraph 3).

==== Relegation play-offs ====
Premier League teams	Agg.	First League teams	1st leg	2nd leg
	x–x			
	x–x			

=== First Semi-final ===
v

v

=== Second Semi-final ===
v

v

=== PFL League 1 (First League) ===
Pos	Team	Pld	W	D	L	GF	GA	GD	Pts	Promotion, qualification or relegation
1	Viktoriya Sumy	12	7	3	2	16	9	+7	24	Promotion to Ukrainian Premier League
2	Ahrobiznes Volochysk	12	7	2	3	19	14	+5	23	Promotion to Ukrainian Premier League
3	Kulykiv-Bilka	12	6	3	3	25	14	+11	21 (Note: Ranked on head-to-head: points, goal difference, goals scored: Kulykiv-Bilka 4(3-2=+1), Poltava 3(4-2=+2)0, Feniks-Mariupol 1(1-4=-3))	Qualification to promotion play-offs
4	Poltava	12	6	3	3	22	10	+12	21	Qualification to promotion play-offs
5	Feniks-Mariupol	12	6	3	3	18	13	+5	21	
6	Oleksandriya	12	5	5	2	17	11	+6	20	Qualified for the Round of 16 UC
7	Lokomotyv Kyiv	12	4	5	3	15	13	+2	17	
8	Prykarpattia-Blaho	12	4	3	5	12	14	−2	15 (Note: Ranked on head-to-head: points, goal difference, goals scored: Prykarpattia Ivano-Frankivsk 4(2-1=+1), Metalist 2(1-1=0)0, Nyva Ternopil 1(2-3=-1))	
9	Metalist Kharkiv	12	4	3	5	13	14	−1	15	Qualified for the Round of 16 UC
10	Nyva Ternopil	12	3	6	3	12	10	+2	15	
11	Inhulets Petrove	11	4	2	5	11	16	−5	14	
12	Kolos-2 Kovalivka	12	4	1	7	12	20	−8	13	Ineligible for promotion
13	UCSA Tarasivka	12	2	5	5	15	19	−4	11	Qualification to relegation play-off
14	Chernihiv	11	2	4	5	12	16	−4	10	Qualification to relegation play-off
15	Probiy Horodenka	12	2	3	7	12	30	−18	9	Relegation to Ukrainian Second League
16	Polissya-2 Zhytomyr	12	1	5	6	17	25	−8	8	Relegation to Ukrainian Second League

Updated to match(es) played on 17 October 2026. Source:
Rules for classification: 1) Points; 2) Head-to-head points; 3) Head-to-head goal difference; 4) Head-to-head goals scored; 5) Goal difference in all games; 6) Goals scored in all games (Note: calculation by criteria indicated in rules 2, 3, 4 is conducted with consideration of all teams that have an equal number of tournament points at the moment of calculation and not only among those which after preliminary criteria have appeared more successful).

==== Relegation play-offs ====
The relegation–promotion play-off games were expected to be scheduled to take place between the 13th and 14th-placed teams with the third and fourth-placed teams of the Second League.

=== PFL League 2 (Second League) ===
==== Group A ====
Pos	Team	Pld	W	D	L	GF	GA	GD	Pts	Promotion, qualification or relegation
1	Bratslav Vinnytsia	10	7	3	0	25	8	+17	24	Qualification to the league's title play-off
2	Nyva Vinnytsia	10	5	4	1	18	9	+9	19	Qualification to the third place play-off
3	Dnister Zalishchyky	10	5	3	2	18	14	+4	18	
4	Vilkhivtsi	10	3	4	3	11	13	−2	13 (Note: Ranked on head-to-head points: Vilkhivtsi 3, Podillya Khmelnytskyi 0)	
5	Podillya Khmelnytskyi	10	4	1	5	17	21	−4	13	
6	Skala 1911 Stryi	9	3	2	4	12	14	−2	11 (Note: Ranked on head-to-head points: Skala 1911 Stryi 3, Sambir-Nyva-2 Ternopil 0)	
7	Sambir-Nyva-2 Ternopil	10	3	2	5	9	16	−7	11	
8	Dinaz Vyshhorod	10	1	4	5	13	23	−10	7	
9	Rukh Lviv	9	1	1	7	13	18	−5	4	

Updated to match(es) played on unknown. Source: PFL.ua
Rules for classification: 1) Points; 2) Head-to-head points; 3) Head-to-head goal difference; 4) Head-to-head goals scored; 5) Goal difference in all games; 6) Goals scored in all games (Note: calculation by criteria indicated in rules 2, 3, 4 is conducted with consideration of all teams that have equal number of tournament points at the moment of calculation and not only among those which after preliminary criteria have appeared more successful).

==== Group B ====
Pos	Team	Pld	W	D	L	GF	GA	GD	Pts	Promotion, qualification or relegation
1	Carbon Cherkasy	9	5	3	1	21	10	+11	18	Qualification to the league's title play-off
2	Avanhard Lozova	9	5	1	3	10	9	+1	16	Qualification to the third place play-off
3	Poltava-2	10	4	2	4	8	7	+1	14	
4	Trostianets	9	3	4	2	9	6	+3	13	
5	Metalurh Zaporizhia	9	3	3	3	11	10	+1	12 (Note: Ranked on head-to-head points: Metalurh Zaporizhia 3, Atlet Kyiv 0)	
6	Atlet Kyiv	8	3	3	2	16	12	+4	12	
7	Rebel Kyiv	8	3	2	3	15	15	0	11	
8	Oleksandriya-2	10	2	4	4	8	10	−2	10	
9	Penuel Kryvyi Rih	10	1	2	7	7	26	−19	5	

Updated to match(es) played on unknown. Source: PFL.ua
Rules for classification: 1) Points; 2) Head-to-head points; 3) Head-to-head goal difference; 4) Head-to-head goals scored; 5) Goal difference in all games; 6) Goals scored in all games (Note: calculation by criteria indicated in rules 2, 3, 4 is conducted with consideration of all teams that have equal number of tournament points at the moment of calculation and not only among those which after preliminary criteria have appeared more successful).

==== The league's play-offs ====
Both groups' winners were expected to play each other for the season's title. Also, both these teams gained a direct promotion to the 2027–28 Ukrainian First League. At the same time, both groups' runners-up were expected to play among themselves for the season's third place and to play against the 13th- and 14th-placed teams in the Persha Liha (First League) for promotion.

Both matches, the league's final and third-place match, were played in a single-leg format and on a neutral field. A draw determined the hosting team for each match, which took place on May 15.

=== Cup competitions ===
==== Ukrainian Cup ====
2027 Ukrainian Cup final

== Women's club football ==
League	Promoted to league	Relegated from league
Prime League	New league (8)	
Higher League	Uzhhorod; Mariupol; Pohoryna Kostopil; Podil Kyiv; DIuSSh 1 Khmelnytskyi; Iunist Chernihiv	~~Vorskla Poltava~~

Note: For all scratched clubs, see section Clubs removed for more details.

=== Prime League ===
Pos	Team	Pld	W	D	L	GF	GA	GD	Pts	Qualification or relegation
1	Metalist 1925 Kharkiv	10	9	1	0	32	3	+29	28	Qualification for the Champions League second qualifying round
2	Seasters Odesa	11	7	3	1	29	3	+26	24 (Note: Head-to-head points: Seasters 3, Polissya 0.)	Qualification for the Champions League second qualifying round
3	Polissya Zhytomyr	11	8	0	3	29	13	+16	24	
4	Kolos Kovalivka	12	7	2	3	27	7	+20	23	
5	Shakhtar Donetsk	11	4	1	6	10	20	−10	13	
6	Ladomyr Volodymyr	12	2	2	8	8	37	−29	8	
7	Kryvbas Kryvyi Rih	12	1	2	9	6	37	−31	5	Qualification to the promotion/relegation playoffs
8	Pantery Uman	11	0	3	8	5	26	−21	3	Relegation to the Vyshcha Liha

Updated to match(es) played on 19 October 2026. Source: womensfootball.com.ua
Rules for classification: 1) Points; 2) Head-to-head points; 3) Head-to-head goal difference; 4) Goal difference; 5) Goals scored; 6) Fair play; 7) Draw lots.

=== Higher League ===
Pos	Team	Pld	W	D	L	GF	GA	GD	Pts	Qualification or relegation
1	Uzhhorod	6	4	1	1	21	4	+17	13	Promotion to the Prime League
2	EMS-Podillya Vinnytsia	5	3	0	2	6	4	+2	9 (Note: Head-to-head points: EMS-Podillia 3, Podil 0.)	Qualification for the playoffs
3	Podil Kyiv	6	3	0	3	10	12	−2	9	
4	Pohoryna Kostopil	6	2	1	3	8	9	−1	7 (Note: Head-to-head points: Pohoryna 4, Mariupol 1, Iunist 0.)	
5	Mariupol	4	2	1	1	6	4	+2	7	
6	SDIuShOR Iunist Chernihiv	5	2	1	2	3	3	0	7	
7	DIuSSh 1 Khmelnytskyi	6	1	0	5	3	21	−18	3	Relegation to the Persha Liha

Updated to match(es) played on 18 October 2026. Source: womensfootball.com.ua
Rules for classification: 1) Points; 2) Head-to-head points; 3) Head-to-head goal difference; 4) Goal difference; 5) Goals scored; 6) Fair play score; 7) Draw of lots.

== Managerial changes ==
This is a list of managerial changes among Ukrainian professional football clubs:

Team	Outgoing manager	Manner of departure	Date of vacancy	Table	Incoming manager	Date of appointment
				Pre-season		
