= 2026–27 Ukrainian Cup =

2026–27 BETON Ukrainian Cup

Tournament details
- Country: Ukraine
- Dates: 8 August 2026 – 19 May 2027; 8–12 August 2026 (qualification round); 21 August 2026 – 19 May 2027 (main event)
- Teams: 69

Tournament statistics
- Matches played: 53
- Goals scored: 177 (3.34 per match)
- Attendance: 23,454 (443 per match)
- Top goal scorer(s): Ivan Bandura, Ihor Horbach, Artem Kozak (3 goals)
- All statistics correct as of 6 October 2026.

The 2026–27 Ukrainian Cup was the 35th annual season of Ukraine's football knockout competition. It is sponsored by the betting company BETON. The Ukrainian Cup is the main domestic cup competition for men's football teams in Ukraine.

Dynamo Kyiv are the defending champions.

With the ongoing Russo-Ukrainian war, many teams are forced to play away, while life in the rear is interrupted by continuous air raids.

== Highlights of the format ==
The competition has kept the new format that was established last season. In total, the competition consists of seven stages - from the qualification to the final match. The tournament starts with the qualifying round, in which representatives of regional associations play with one another. In the Round of 64, AAFU teams, other amateur teams from the qualification round, PFL clubs from the Second and First leagues, as well as most clubs from the UPL will join the trophy challenge. Finally, the last entrants are the European competition participants that enter the competition in the Round of 32.

All matches at each stage of the Ukrainian Cup consist of one match. Pairings are determined by blind draw, without dividing teams into seeded and unseeded teams. It has also been noted that in all matches, except the final, if a draw occurs after regular time, no extra time will be played. The winner is determined immediately in a post-match penalty shootout.

Compared with the previous season, the number of participants has changed insignificantly, to 69, an increase of 1. Additionally, the number of amateur teams that entered the competition has increased noticeably to 25, compared to 21 previously. This compensated for the withdrawal of several clubs from the professional competitions. Due to the Russian occupation, at least five regions cannot compete in the tournament, except for a few clubs that were evacuated and survived the relocation.

== Team allocation and schedule ==
Distribution
	Teams entering this round	Teams advancing from the previous round
Qualification round (18 teams)	18 entrants from regional associations	
Round of 64 (56 teams)	12 entrants of the Premier League; 14 entrants of the First League; 15 entrants of the Second League; 6 entrants of the Amateur Cup	9 winners from the Qualification round
Round of 32 (16 teams)	4 entrants from the Premier League	28 winners from the Round of 64

=== Rounds schedule ===
Phase	Round	Number of fixtures	Clubs remaining	Draw date	Game date
Qualification		9	18 → 9	31 July 2026	9–11 August 2026
Main event	Round of 64	28	56 → 28	31 July 2026	21–23 August 2026
Main event	Round of 32	16	32 → 16	27 August 2026	8-10 September 2026
Main event	Round of 16	8	16 → 8	18 September 2026	27-29 October 2026
Main event	Quarter-finals	4	8 → 4	November 2026	2-4 March 2027
Main event	Semi-finals	2	4 → 2		20-22 April 2027
Main event	Final	1	2 → 1		19 May 2027

=== Teams ===
Enter in Qualification	Enter in Round of 64				Enter in Round of 32
Regional associations 18 teams	AAFU; 6 teams	PFL League 2; 15/18 teams	PFL League 1; 14/16 teams	UPL; 12/16 teams	UPL; 4/16 teams
Ahron Velyki Hayi (Ternopil); Bazys Kochubiyivka (Cherkasy); Chaika Vyshhorod (Kyiv city); Dovbush Chernivtsi (Chernivtsi); Druzhba-Kozaky Nizhyn (Chernihiv); Inhul Pervozvanivka (Kirovohrad); IRON Zaporizhzhia (Zaporizhzhia); FC Kalynivka (Kyiv); Kolos Polonne (Khmelnytskyi); LSTM 536 Lutsk (Volyn); FC Mykolaiv (Lviv); FC Novozhukiv (Rivne); Palmira Odesa (Odesa); Pokuttia Kolomyia (Ivano-Frankivsk); FC Reshetylivka (Poltava); Ukrainian Team Dnipro (Dnipropetrovsk); VIVAD Romaniv (Zhytomyr); FC Novyi Rozdil (extra)	Mayak Sarny; Olympiya Savyntsi*; FC Vilkhivtsi*; To4ka Odesa*; FC Rokyta*; Ahrotekh Tyshkivka*	Atlet Kyiv; Avanhard Lozova*; Bratslav Vinnytsia*; Carbon Cherkasy*; Dinaz Vyshhorod; Dnister Zalishchyky*; Metalurh Zaporizhia; Nyva Vinnytsia; Penuel Kryvyi Rih; Podillya Khmelnytskyi; Rebel Kyiv; Rukh Lviv; Skala 1911 Stryi; FC Trostianets; SC Vilkhivtsi	Ahrobiznes Volochysk; FC Chernihiv; Feniks-Mariupol; Inhulets Petrove; Kulykiv-Bilka; Lokomotyv Kyiv; Metalist Kharkiv; Nyva Ternopil; FC Oleksandriya; SC Poltava; Probiy Horodenka; Prykarpattia Ivano-Frankivsk; UCSA Tarasivka; Viktoriya Sumy	Bukovyna Chernivtsi; Chornomorets Odesa; Epitsentr Kamianets-P.; Karpaty Lviv; Kolos Kovalivka; Kryvbas Kryvyi Rih; FC Kudrivka; Livyi Bereh Kyiv; Metalist 1925 Kharkiv; Obolon Kyiv; Veres Rivne; Zorya Luhansk	Dynamo Kyiv; LNZ Cherkasy; Polissya Zhytomyr; Shakhtar Donetsk

Notes:

- With the asterisk (*) are noted the Second League teams that were recently admitted to the league from amateurs and the AAFU (amateur) team(s) that qualified in addition to the Amateur Cup finalist(s).
- Five reserve teams from the PFL League 1 (2) and League 2 (3) were not eligible to participate.
- The AAFU quota was increased from 4 to 6. Initially, Mayak Sarny, Avanhard Lozova, Olympia Savyntsi, and Dnister Zalishchyky were eligible for the tournament. Due to an increase in quota and Avanhard and Dnister obtaining professional status, all four quarter-finalists were added to the competition.
- Lviv Oblast was allowed 2 teams for the regional representative quota, with FC Mykolaiv competing as the Lviv Region Cup holder and FC Novyi Rozdil as the extra. Chaika Vyshhorod represents Kyiv city as the 2026 Kyiv City Cup winners. Dovbush Chernivtsi replaced Fazenda Chernivtsi.
- Teams that are making their first appearance (15): Bazys Kochubiyivka, Bratslav Vinnytsia, Chaika Vyshhorod, Dovbush Chernivtsi, Druzhba-Kozaky Nizhyn, Inhul Pervozvanivka, Kalynivka, Novozhukiv, Novyi Rozdil, Reshetylivka, Rokyta, To4ka Odesa, Ukrainian Team Dnipro, FC Vilkhivtsi, VIVAD Romaniv.
- Please note that there are two clubs with a similar name, Vilkhivtsi. They both represent villages of Vilkhivtsi, but in two different regions: SC Vilkhivtsi (PFL League 2) located in the Zakarpattia Oblast, FC Vilkhivtsi (AAFU quota) located in the Ivano-Frankivsk Oblast.

== Competition schedule ==
Legends: AM – AAFU (amateur) competitions (IV or lower tiers), 2L – Second League (III tier), 1L – First League (II tier), PL – Premier League (I tier)

=== Qualification round (1/64) ===
In this round, 18 clubs from the regional associations play each other to determine 9 winners who will proceed to the Round of 64.

The draw for the qualification and the round of 64 was held on 31 July 2026 with the participation of Oleh Luzhny. Right before the draw, all participants of the qualification round were placed in three regional groups of six (A, B, C).

Group A	Group B	Group C
(Lviv Oblast) Novyi Rozdil; (Lviv Oblast) Mykolaiv; (Ivano-Frankivsk Oblast) Pokuttya Kolomyia; (Chernivtsi Oblast) Dovbush Chernivtsi; (Ternopil Oblast) Ahron Velyki Hayi; (Volyn Oblast) LSTM 536 Lutsk	(Khmelnytskyi Oblast) Kolos Polonne; (Rivne Oblast) Novozhukiv; (Chernihiv Oblast) Druzhba-Kozaky Nizhyn; (Zhytomyr Oblast) VIVAD Romaniv; (Kyiv) Chaika Vyshhorod; (Kyiv Oblast) Kalynivka	(Dnipropetrovsk Oblast) Ukrainian Team Dnipro; (Poltava Oblast) Reshetylivka; (Kirovohrad Oblast) Inhul Pervozvanivka; (Odesa Oblast) Palmira Odesa; (Zaporizhia Oblast) IRON Zaporizhia; (Cherkasy Oblast) Bazys Kochubiyivka

Number of teams per tier remaining in the competitions in this round (Note: Yellow/tan color indicates that teams from that tier enter the competition in the next rounds; green color indicates that teams from that tier participate in the current round. The competition does not allow second teams or reserves to participate.)
Ukrainian Premier League (1)	Ukrainian First League (2)	Ukrainian Second League (3)	Ukrainian Association of Amateur Football (4)	Regional football associations of Ukraine (5)	Total
16 / 16	14 / 14	15 / 15	6 / 6	18 / 18	69 / 69

8 August 2026	FC Novyi Rozdil (AM)	0–0 (4–2 p)	(AM) FC Mykolaiv	Novyi Rozdil, Lviv Oblast
16:00		Report		Stadium: Halychyna; Referee: Ivan Koval (Lviv)
	Penalties
	Bohdan (penalty scored); Holodryha (penalty scored); Derevetskyi (penalty scored); Ostruvka (penalty scored)		(penalty missed) Fedyna; (penalty missed) Tsyupka; (penalty scored) Bohdanov; (penalty scored) Zavalyak

9 August 2026	Pokuttya Kolomyia (AM)	2–1	(AM) Dovbush Chernivtsi	Kolomyia, Ivano-Frankivsk Oblast
16:00	Klyuchko 29', 61'	Report	Stoloshchuk 53'	Stadium: Yunist; Attendance: 510; Referee: Rostyslav Molnar (Uzhhorod)

9 August 2026	Kolos Polonne (AM)	3–1	(AM) FC Novozhukiv	Polonne, Khmelnytskyi Oblast
14:00	Strashkevych 69' (pen.), 90+6' (pen.); Borysevych 90+1'	Report	Yashchuk 57'	Stadium: Polon; Referee: Vladyslav Vashchenko (Kyiv)

9 August 2026	Druzhba-Kozaky Nizhyn (AM)	2–2 (4–3 p)	(AM) VIVAD Romaniv	Kudrivka, Chernihiv Oblast
12:00	Kostenko 5' (pen.); Kabanets 34'	Report	Polishchuk 64'; Mosiychuk 89'	Stadium: Kudrivka Arena; Referee: Ihor Bondarchuk (Kyiv)
	Penalties
	Kostenko (penalty scored); Varyanyk (penalty scored); Iosha (penalty missed); Syplyvets (penalty scored); Bohunov (penalty scored)		(penalty scored) Mosiychuk; (penalty scored) Melnychenko; (penalty missed) Shevchuk; (penalty scored) Vyhovskyi; (penalty missed) Hrynevych

9 August 2026	Ukrainian Team Dnipro (AM)	0–5	(AM) FC Reshetylivka	Dnipro
14:00		Report	Odentsov 14'; Pylypovets 35' (pen.); Kunyev 73'; Sheptitskyi 81', 83'	Stadium: Olimpiyski Rezervy; Referee: Oleksandr Potapenko (Kharkiv)

9 August 2026	IRON Zaporizhia (AM)	0–1	(AM) Bazys Kochubiyivka	Bilozirya, Cherkasy Oblast
15:00		Report	Hryshchenko 46'	Stadium: Zorya; Referee: Rostyslav Dubyna (Dnipro)

11 August 2026	Inhul Pervozvanivka (AM)	1–3	(AM) Palmira Odesa	Kropyvnytskyi
14:00	Honcharov 73'	Report	Shevtsov 6'; Onufrak (red card) 11'; Barsukov 40'; Popov 67'	Stadium: Zirka imeni Berezkina; Referee: Maksym Polishchuk (Kryvyi Rih)

11 August 2026	Chaika Vyshhorod (AM)	1–5	(AM) FC Kalynivka	Vyshhorod, Kyiv Oblast
14:00	Donets 85'	Report	Komisar 20'; Rokotyanskyi 22'; Hryshchenko 79', 82'; Chepurnenko 89'	Stadium: Enerhetyk; Referee: Vitaliy Chekita (Odesa)

12 August 2026	Ahron Velyki Hayi (AM)	3–3 (5–6 p)	(AM) LSTM 536 Lutsk	Velyki Hayi, Ternopil Oblast
16:00	Hromyak 47' (pen.); Semenets 50', 86'	Report	Bandura 28', 90'; Tsikhotskyi 65'	Stadium: Tsentralnyi; Referee: Bohdan Lepak (Lviv)
	Penalties
	Poniedielnik (penalty scored); Skakun (penalty scored); Bilyk (penalty missed); Mostovyi (penalty scored); Kovalyk (penalty scored); Shcherbatyuk (penalty scored); Semenets (penalty missed)		(penalty scored) Samorchuk; (penalty scored) Zhylinskyi; (penalty scored) Shvorak; (penalty scored) Franchuk; (penalty missed) Herasymuk; (penalty scored) Shchaviy; (penalty scored) Bandura

=== Round of 64 (1/32) ===
In this round, 12 clubs from the Premier League, 14 clubs from the First League, 15 clubs from the Second League, and 6 teams from the last season's Amateur Cup entered the competition and joined the 9 winners of the Qualification round (all amateurs).

Number of teams per tier remaining in the competition in this round
Ukrainian Premier League (1)	Ukrainian First League (2)	Ukrainian Second League (3)	Ukrainian Association of Amateur Football (4)	Regional football associations of Ukraine (5)	Total
16 / 16	14 / 14	15 / 15	6 / 6	9 / 18	60 / 69

20 August 2026	Dinaz Vyshhorod (2L)	0–6	(1L) Feniks-Mariupol	Demydiv, Kyiv Oblast
14:00		Report	Sydorenko 8'; Kucherov 70', 77'; Orikhovskyi 73' (pen.); Kyslenko 74', 90'	Stadium: Dinaz; Referee: Mykola Baydyuk (Chernivtsi)

21 August 2026	Rebel Kyiv (2L)	0–4	(1L) Ahrobiznes Volochysk	Makariv, Kyiv Oblast
12:00		Report	Syomka 8', 25'; Riznyk 36'; Len 61'	Stadium: Tsentralnyi imeni Brukvenka; Referee: Myroslav Lypko (Ivano-Frankivsk)

21 August 2026	Druzhba-Kozaky Nizhyn (AM)	3–5	(AM) Bazys Kochubiyivka	Kudrivka, Chernihiv Oblast
12:00	Katynov 2', 81'; Varyanyk 11'	Report	Popov 17'; Sukhanov 24', 79'; Vryzhchuk 43'; Sytnyk 90+3'	Stadium: Kudrivka Arena; Referee: Maksym Skrypnyk (Kyiv Oblast)

21 August 2026	Bratslav Vinnytsia (2L)	0–2	(1L) FC Oleksandriya	Stavyshche, Kyiv Oblast
12:00		Report	Vashchenko 54'; Prytula 85'	Stadium: Kolos; Attendance: 47; Referee: Vasyl Faida (Lviv)

21 August 2026	Lokomotyv Kyiv (1L)	1–3	(1L) Probiy Horodenka	Kyiv
14:00	Savchuk (red card) 43'; Sakhnenko 53'	Report	Lepskyi 21'; Huk 51'; Fesenko 90+2'	Stadium: imeni Bannikova; Referee: Lyudmyla Telbukh (Dnipro)

21 August 2026	Podillya Khmelnytskyi (2L)	1–3	(1L) Viktoriya Sumy	Khmelnytskyi
16:00	Savin 11'	Report	Dolinskyi 5'; Hryshchenko 13'; Sharay 79'	Stadium: Podillya; Attendance: 560; Referee: Kristina Kozoroh (Kyiv Oblast)

22 August 2026	To4ka Odesa (AM)	1–2	(PL) Epitsentr Kamianets-Podilskyi	Odesa
13:00	Ponomarenko 63'	Report	Nene 45+1'; Telinskyi 60' (o.g.)	Stadium: Ivan; Referee: Dmytro Osaulenko (Kyiv)

22 August 2026	UCSA Tarasivka (1L)	0–3	(PL) Kolos Kovalivka	Bucha, Kyiv Oblast
12:00		Report	Tsurikov (red card) 55'; Rrapaj 60'; Tahiri 86'; Klymchuk 90+2'	Stadium: Stadium Yuvileinyi; Referee: Mykhaylo Rayda (Zakarpattia Oblast)

22 August 2026	Avanhard Lozova (2L)	1–6	(PL) FC Kudrivka	Yuriivka, Dnipropetrovsk Oblast
12:00	Hladkyi 31'	Report	Byelyayev 3', 42' (pen.); Selin 17' (o.g.); Cherevatenko 56' (o.g.); Yesin 71'; Oharkov 80'	Stadium: DYuSSh; Referee: Yevhen Tsybulko (Cherkasy Oblast)

22 August 2026	FC Reshetylivka (AM)	1–4	(1L) Prykarpattia Ivano-Frankivsk	Poltava
13:00	Opara 83'	Report	Hraban 51', 76'; Kos 62'; Demkiv 79' (pen.)	Stadium: Molodizhnyi; Referee: Mykola Bohatyr (Zaporizhzhia)

22 August 2026	Skala 1911 Stryi (2L)	0–6	(PL) Zorya Luhansk	Stryi, Lviv Oblast
13:00		Report	Dryshlyuk 21'; Budkivskyi 47'; Juninho 57'; Horbach 63', 75'; Boyko 87'	Stadium: Sokil; Attendance: 1,500; Referee: Nazariy Dord (Uzhhorod)

22 August 2026	Kolos Polonne (AM)	1–2	(2L) FC Trostianets	Zviahel, Zhytomyr Oblast
13:00	Shavrin 48'; Turchanov (red card) 90+3'	Report	Chehlov 23', 60'; Bohdanov (red card) 68'	Stadium: Avanhard; Referee: Taras Kozak (Lviv Oblast)

22 August 2026	FC Rokyta (AM)	0–3	(PL) Kryvbas Kryvyi Rih	Rokyta, Poltava Oblast
13:00		Report	Pidhurskyi 33'; Vilivald 56'; Herbert 78'	Stadium: Rokyta; Referee: Oleksandr Solovyan (Kyiv Oblast)

22 August 2026	Mayak Sarny (AM)	0–0 (4–2 p)	(1L) SC Poltava	Sarny, Rivne Oblast
13:00		Report		Stadium: Sarny Arena; Referee: Yaroslav Leskiv (Lviv Oblast)
	Penalties
	Totovytskyi (penalty scored); Yakubov (penalty scored); Serhiychuk (penalty scored); Danylyuk (penalty scored)		(penalty scored) Seitkhalilov; (penalty scored) Prikhna; (penalty missed) Danylenko; (penalty missed) Kasimov

22 August 2026	FC Kalynivka (AM)	0–9	(PL) FC Kharkiv	Shchaslyve, Kyiv Oblast
14:00		Report	Paraco 45'; Kalyuzhnyi 50'; Itodo 62'; Smolyakov 64'; Rashica 69'; Zabërgja 75'; Sydorenko 77' (o.g.); Antyukh 85'; Castillo 90'	Stadium: Arsenal Arena; Referee: Denys Reznikov (Kamianske)

22 August 2026	Inhulets Petrove (1L)	1–4	(PL) Veres Rivne	Petrove, Kirovohrad Oblast
15:00	Ursolov 24'	Report	Gonçalves 26'; Niyo (Note: In the report David Niyo marked as David Neno.) 51'; Bahriy 81'; Sharay 83'	Stadium: Inhulets Arena; Referee: Volodymyr Novokhatniy (Cherkasy)

22 August 2026	Dnister Zalishchyky (2L)	0–3	(PL) Livyi Bereh Kyiv	Zalishchyky, Ternopil Oblast
15:00		Report	Yakymiv 6'; Voloshyn 13'; Shastal 90+2'	Stadium: Dnister; Referee: Maksym Firsov (Rivne)

22 August 2026	Nyva Ternopil (1L)	0–4	(PL) Bukovyna Chernivtsi	Sambir, Lviv Oblast
16:00		Report	Stasyuk 18'; Hrusha 56'; Ilyin 87'; Mykhalchuk 90+2' (o.g.)	Stadium: imeni Brovarskoho; Referee: Andriy Zaytsev (Donetsk Oblast)

22 August 2026	Nyva Vinnytsia (2L)	2–2 (4–3 p)	(2L) Rukh Lviv	Vinnytsia
16:00	Vlasenko 17'; Kyslyanka 64' (o.g.)	Report	Fedushko 36', 40'	Stadium: Nyva training base Referee: Serhiy Podryhulya (Lutsk)
	Penalties
	Moroz (penalty scored); Boryachuk (penalty scored); Kalinin (penalty scored); Mendes (penalty scored); Yevchev (penalty missed)		(penalty scored) Fedushko; (penalty scored) Bodak; (penalty missed) Uhrynchuk; (penalty scored) Barshak; (penalty missed) Kroytar

22 August 2026	Karpaty Lviv (PL)	2–0	(PL) Obolon Kyiv	Lviv
18:00	Séry 37'; Iglesias 85'	Report		Stadium: Ukraina; Attendance: 6,200; Referee: Dmytro Yevtukhov (Dnipro)

23 August 2026	Penuel Kryvyi Rih (2L)	0–1	(1L) Metalist Kharkiv	Kryvyi Rih, Dnipropetrovsk Oblast
12:00		Report	Porokh 45+1'	Stadium: Sparta; Referee: Pavlo Pleshko (Kremenchuk)

23 August 2026	Ahrotekh Tyshkivka (AM)	2–1	(AM) FC Vilkhivtsi	Tyshkivka, Kirovohrad Oblast
12:00	Zamurenko 57'; Karanha 85'	Report	Pavlyuk 20'; Andrusyak (yellow card) 70' (yellow-red card) 86'; Pysko (red card) 88'	Stadium: Tyshkivskyi litsei Referee: Anatoliy Ukhov (Kryvyi Rih)

23 August 2026	Palmira Odesa (AM)	1–2	(1L) Kulykiv-Bilka	Odesa
12:00	Bulhanin 75'	Report	Malskyi 69'; Haladey 80' (pen.)	Stadium: Ivan (Note: The game Palmira vs Kulykiv-Bilka was originally to be held at Chornomorets Stadium, but had to be arranged at an alternative facility since the stadium has not been repaired in time.); Referee: Veronika Vasylchenko (Sloviansk)

23 August 2026	Pokuttia Kolomyia (AM)	0–1	(2L) Carbon Cherkasy	Horodenka, Ivano-Frankivsk Oblast
13:00		Report	Haydychuk 27' (o.g.); Lazarenko (red card) 39'	Stadium: Probiy Arena; Referee: Ivan Sadkovskyi (Ternopil Oblast)

23 August 2026	Olympiya Savyntsi (AM)	2–1	(2L) Metalurh Zaporizhia	Myrhorod, Poltava Oblast
13:00	Pochernin 41'; Reutov 79'	Report	Bodan (yellow card) 36' (yellow-red card) 78'; Sitalo 87'	Stadium: Start; Referee: Artem Hordynskyi (Vinnytsia)

23 August 2026	FC Novyi Rozdil (AM)	2–1	(2L) Atlet Kyiv	Kulykiv, Lviv Oblast
15:00	Hulevskyi 62'; Muzyka 76'	Report	Myts 90+2'	Stadium: Kulykiv Arena; Referee: Andriy Shevchuk (Volyn Oblast)

23 August 2026	SC Vilkhivtsi (2L)	1–0	(PL) Chornomorets Odesa	Vilkhivtsi, Zakarpattia Oblast
16:00	Shestakov 33'	Report		Stadium: Vilkhivtsi Arena-Park; Referee: Ivan Salash (Kalush)

23 August 2026	LSTM 536 Lutsk (AM)	1–2	(1L) FC Chernihiv	Lutsk
16:00	Bandura 12'	Report	Shalfeyev 55'; Haloyan 62'	Stadium: Avanhard; Attendance: 760; Referee: Viktor Solovyov (Odesa)

=== Round of 32 (1/16) ===
In this round, 4 clubs from the Premier League: Dynamo Kyiv, LNZ Cherkasy, Polissya Zhytomyr and Shakhtar Donetsk joined the 28 winners of the Round of 64 (10 clubs from the Premier League, 9 clubs from the First League, 4 clubs from the Second League, and 5 clubs from amateurs). The draw for the round of 32 was held on 27 August 2026 with the participation of Oleksandr Holovko. The Round of 32 (1/16) matches will be held in a span of two weeks, from September 8-10 to September 15-17, 2026.

Number of teams per tier remaining in the competition in this round
Ukrainian Premier League (1)	Ukrainian First League (2)	Ukrainian Second League (3)	Ukrainian Association of Amateur Football (4)	Regional football associations of Ukraine (5)	Total
14 / 16	9 / 14	4 / 15	3 / 6	2 / 18	32 / 69

8 September 2026	Olympiya Savyntsi (AM)	0–2	(PL) Kryvbas Kryvyi Rih	Myrhorod, Poltava Oblast
13:00	Reutov (yellow card) 72' (yellow-red card) 90+3'	Report	Rivas 30'; Santiago 90+2'	Stadium: Start; Attendance: 488; Referee: Ihor Stashuk (Chernihiv)

8 September 2026	Bazys Kochubiyivka (AM)	1–4	(AM) Mayak Sarny	Uman, Cherkasy Oblast
15:00	Rybak 21'	Report	Kulach 4', 51' (pen.); Totovytskyi 63'; Yakubov 73'	Stadium: Tsentralnyi Stadion; Referee: Yaroslav Leskiv (Lviv Oblast)

9 September 2026	Viktoriya Sumy (1L)	0–1	(1L) Metalist Kharkiv	Trostianets, Sumy Oblast
11:00		Report	Prykhodko 77'	Stadium: imeni Kutsa; Referee: Pavlo Plieshko (Kremenchuk)

9 September 2026	Carbon Cherkasy (2L)	0–3	(PL) Epitsentr Kamianets-P.	Heronymivka, Cherkasy Oblast
12:00		Report	Kozak 22', 72', 90+2'	Stadium: FC LNZ training base Attendance: 160; Referee: Vasyl Faida (Lviv)

9 September 2026	Probiy Horodenka (1L)	1–1 (1–3 p)	(1L) FC Oleksandriya	Horodenka, Ivano-Frankivsk Oblast
13:00	Hirnyi 47'	Report	da Silva 33'	Stadium: Probiy Arena; Referee: Ihor Sadkovskyi (Ternopil Oblast)
	Penalties
	Borysenko (penalty missed); Hirnyi (penalty scored); Ivanychuk (penalty missed); Napuda (penalty missed)		(penalty scored) Tretyakov; (penalty scored) Buletsa; (penalty scored) Kuzmyn

9 September 2026	FC Novyi Rozdil (AM)	3–1	(AM) Ahrotekh Tyshkivka	Kulykiv, Lviv Oblast
14:00	Adam 57'; Muzyka 60'; Hulevskyi 88'	Report	Kryvoshei 41'	Stadium: Arena Kulykiv; Attendance: 100; Referee: Vitaliy Malyar (Khmelnytskyi)

9 September 2026	Ahrobiznes Volochysk (1L)	1–1 (2–4 p)	(PL) Livyi Bereh Kyiv	Volochysk, Khmelnytskyi Oblast
15:00	Riznyk 13'	Report	Banada 90+3'	Stadium: Yunist; Referee: Lyudmyla Telbukh (Dnipro)
	Penalties
	Nyzhnyk (penalty missed); Zin (penalty scored); Kozak (penalty missed); Palyukh (penalty scored)		(penalty scored) Sokolov; (penalty scored) Andradina; (penalty scored) Vorobchak; (penalty scored) Shastal

9 September 2026	Feniks-Mariupol (1L)	0–2	(PL) Zorya Luhansk	Lviv
16:00		Report	Horbach 53'; Budkivskyi 70'	Stadium: SKIF; Referee: Serhiy Zadyran (Kyiv Oblast)

9 September 2026	Polissya Zhytomyr (PL)	2–0	(PL) FC Kudrivka	Zhytomyr
18:00	Haiduchyk 69'; Andrade 79'	Report		Stadium: Tsentralnyi; Referee: Oleksandr Shandor (Lviv)

10 September 2026	Nyva Vinnytsia (2L)	0–1	(PL) Dynamo Kyiv	Vinnytsia
15:30		Report	Thiaré 51'	Stadium: Nyva training base Attendance: 2,590; Referee: Oleksandr Kalyonov (Khmelnytskyi)

16 September 2026	Kolos Kovalivka (PL)	2–3	(PL) Karpaty Lviv	Kovalivka, Kyiv Oblast
12:00	Salabai 8'; Ndukve 45+2'	Report	Babohlo 32'; Chachua 47'; Vantukh 67'	Stadium: Kolos; Attendance: 536; Referee: Oleh Kohut (Ternopil)

16 September 2026	Prykarpattia Ivano-Frankivsk (1L)	0–2	(PL) FC Kharkiv	Ivano-Frankivsk
14:00		Report	Zabërgja 42'; Hadzhyiev 50'	Stadium: Rukh; Attendance: 950; Referee: Oleksandr Solovyan (Kyiv Oblast)

16 September 2026	Kulykiv-Bilka (1L)	0–1	(PL) Veres Rivne	Kulykiv, Lviv Oblast
15:00		Report	Kharatin 45+2'	Stadium: Arena Kulykiv; Attendance: 717; Referee: Volodymyr Novokhatniy (Cherkasy)

16 September 2026	Bukovyna Chernivtsi (PL)	0–0 (0–3 p)	(PL) LNZ Cherkasy	Chernivtsi
16:00		Report		Stadium: Bukovyna; Attendance: 6,128; Referee: Mykhailo Raida (Zakarpattia Oblast)
	Penalties
	Dakhnovskyi (penalty missed); Kozhushko (penalty missed); Hrusha (penalty missed)		(penalty scored) Didyk; (penalty scored) Jashari; (penalty scored) Kuzyk

17 September 2026	SC Vilkhivtsi (2L)	0–3	(PL) Shakhtar Donetsk	Vilkhivtsi, Zakarpattia Oblast
15:00		Report	Nazaryna 30'; Carvalho 44'; Tsukanov 72'	Stadium: Vilkhivtsi Arena-Park; Attendance: 2,128; Referee: Andriy Kovalenko (Poltava)

6 October 2026	FC Trostianets (2L)	2–4	(1L) FC Chernihiv	Trostyanets
11:00	Buryak 23', 35'	Report	Shumylo 46'; Novikov 76', 83'; Bezborodko 90+4'	Stadium: Kuts Stadium; Attendance: 80; Referee: Yehor Kievlich (Kropyvnytskyi)

=== Round of 16 (1/8) ===
In this round, 16 remaining clubs contest the main trophy (11 from the Premier League, 3 from the First League, and 2 from amateurs). The draw was held on 18 September 2026 with the participation of Denys Boyko.

Number of teams per tier remaining in the competition in this round
Ukrainian Premier League (1)	Ukrainian First League (2)	Ukrainian Second League (3)	Ukrainian Association of Amateur Football (4)	Regional football associations of Ukraine (5)	Total
11 / 16	3 / 14	0 / 15	1 / 6	1 / 18	16 / 69

27 October 2026	Livyi Bereh Kyiv (PL)	0–1	(PL) Veres Rivne	Zolochivska, Kyiv Oblast
13:00		Report	Wesley 41'	Stadium: Arena Livyi Bereh; Attendance: 376; Referee: Oleksandr Solovian (Kyiv Oblast)

27 October 2026	Shakhtar Donetsk (PL)	3–0	(PL) Dynamo Kyiv	Lviv
18:00	Mendoza 43'; Silva 74'; Santana 87'	Report	Mykhavko (red card) 31'; Voloshyn (red card) 90+2'; Ponomarenko (red card) 90+5'	Stadium: Arena Lviv; Attendance: 4,160; Referee: Viktor Kopievskyi (Kropyvnytskyi)

28 October 2026	Mayak Sarny (AM)	1–2	(PL) Kharkiv	Sarny, Rivne Oblast
11:00	Romanyuk 76'	Report	Kohut 35'; Dubko 87'	Stadium: Sarny Arena; Attendance: 1,320; Referee: Nazariy Dyord (Uzhhorod)

28 October 2026	LNZ Cherkasy (PL)	0–1	(1L) Metalist Kharkiv	Cherkasy
13:00		Report	Kaydalov 81'	Stadium: Cherkasy Arena; Attendance: 510; Referee: Dmytro Kubryak (Odesa)

28 October 2026	Polissya Zhytomyr (PL)	2–0	(AM) FC Novyi Rozdil	Zhytomyr
13:00	Filippov 10'; Hayduchyk 33'	Report		Stadium: Tsentralnyi Stadion; Attendance: 1,860; Referee: Volodymyr Novokhatniy (Cherkasy)

29 October 2026	FC Chernihiv (1L)	1–2	(PL) Epitsentr Kamianets-P.	Shchaslyve, Kyiv Oblast
12:00	Bezghubchenko 45+2'	Report	Myronyuk 24'; Yevpak 86'	Stadium: Knyazha-Arena (Arsenal-Arena); Referee: Dmytro Osaulenko (Kyiv).

29 October 2026	Zorya Luhansk (PL)	1–1 (2–3 p)	(PL) Kryvbas Kryvyi Rih	Kyiv
13:00	Jordan 7'	Report	Herbert 27' (Note: In some sources, it was reported that Volodymyr Vilivald scored the equalizer.)	Stadium: Stadion Dynamo imeni Lobanovskoho; Attendance: 165; Referee: Oleksandr Omelchenko (Sloviansk)
	Penalties
	Jordan (penalty missed); Dejan Popara (penalty scored); Horbach (penalty missed); Dryshlyuk (penalty scored); Budkivskyi (penalty missed)		(penalty scored) Bar Lin; (penalty scored) João Machado; (penalty missed) Roy Nawi; (penalty scored) Joseph Jones

29 October 2026	Karpaty Lviv (PL)	2–1	(1L) Oleksandriya	Lviv
18:00	Chachua 27'; Fellipe Vieira 43'		Kozak 45'	Stadium: Stadion Ukraina; Referee: Maksym Kozyriatskyi (Zaporizhzhia)

=== Quarter-finals (1/4) ===
In this round, 8 remaining clubs contest the main trophy.

Number of teams per tier remaining in the competition in this round
Ukrainian Premier League (1)	Ukrainian First League (2)	Ukrainian Second League (3)	Ukrainian Association of Amateur Football (4)	Regional football associations of Ukraine (5)	Total
7 / 16	1 / 14	0 / 15	0 / 6	0 / 18	8 / 69

2-4 March 2027	v	TBD
TBD		Stadium: TBD; Referee: TBD

2-4 March 2027	v	TBD
TBD		Stadium: TBD; Referee: TBD

2-4 March 2027	v	TBD
TBD		Stadium: TBD; Referee: TBD

2-4 March 2027	v	TBD
TBD		Stadium: TBD; Referee: TBD

=== Semi-finals (1/2) ===
Number of teams per tier remaining in the competition in this round
Ukrainian Premier League (1)	Ukrainian First League (2)	Ukrainian Second League (3)	Ukrainian Association of Amateur Football (4)	Regional football associations of Ukraine (5)	Total
0 / 16	0 / 14	0 / 15	0 / 6	0 / 18	0 / 69

20-22 April 2027	v	TBD
TBD		Stadium: TBD; Referee: TBD

20-22 April 2027	v	TBD
TBD		Stadium: TBD; Referee: TBD

=== Final ===
Number of teams per tier remaining in the competition in this round
Ukrainian Premier League (1)	Ukrainian First League (2)	Ukrainian Second League (3)	Ukrainian Association of Amateur Football (4)	Regional football associations of Ukraine (5)	Total
0 / 16	0 / 14	0 / 15	0 / 6	0 / 18	0 / 69

19 May 2027	v	TBD
TBD		Stadium: TBD; Referee: TBD

== Matches affected by air raid alerts ==
Qualification round
Chaika vs Kalynivka. Originally, the match was scheduled to be played on 8 August 2026, but had to be postponed to 11 August 2026 due to the missile strike on Kyiv.

Round of 64
To4ka vs Epitsentr. The match was scheduled to start on 21 August 2026 at 11:00 local time at Lyustdorf training center, but due to the Russian missile attack, it had to be rearranged to 22 August 2026 at 13:00 and moved to Ivan Stadium.
UCSA vs Kolos (K). The match was postponed for a few hours due to the Russian missile attack.
Avanhard (L) vs Kudrivka. The match was postponed on numerous occasions due to prolonged air raid alerts.
Rokyta vs Kryvbas. The match was postponed for a while due to a Russian missile attack.
Penuel vs Metalist. The match was postponed several times due to successive air raid alerts in Kryvyi Rih.

Round of 32
Bazys vs Mayak. The match was interrupted in the 66th minute for 3 hours and finished in near darkness.
Viktoriya vs Metalist. The match has been interrupted for some time due to air raid alerts.
Polissya vs Kudrivka. The match was interrupted in the 22nd minute and in the 66th minute due to an air raid alert in Zhytomyr. Because of that, the match ended after 10 p.m.
Trostianets vs Chernihiv. The match did not start and could not be held at all because of extended air raid alerts. It was postponed to a later date.

Round of 16
Livyi Bereh vs Veres. The match was postponed for a while due to a Russian missile attack.

== Statistics ==
=== Top goalscorers ===
The competition's top goalscorers, including those from the preliminary rounds.
As of 28 October 2026

Rank	Scorer	Team	Goals (Pen.)
1	Ivan Bandura	LSTM 536 Lutsk	3 (0)
1	Ihor Horbach	Zorya Luhansk	3 (0)
1	Artem Kozak	Epitsentr Kamianets-Podilskyi	3 (0)
4	23 player(s)		2
27	125 player(s)		1

- Own goals: Volodymyr Telinskyi (To4ka Odesa for Epitsentr Kamianets-Podilskyi), Pavlo Cherevatenko (Avanhard Lozova for Kudrivka), Yevhen Selin (Avanhard Lozova for Kudrivka), Bohdan Sydorenko (Kalynivka for Kharkiv), Milan Mykhalchuk (Nyva Ternopil for Bukovyna Chernivtsi), Kostyantyn Kyslyanka (Rukh Lviv for Nyva Vinnytsia), Serhiy Hayduchyk (Pokuttia Kolomyia for Carbon Cherkasy)

=== Clean sheets ===
As of 28 October 2026

Rank	Player	Club	Clean sheets
1	Pavlo Pletnyov	Metalist Kharkiv	3
2	6 player(s)		2
8	19 player(s)		1

=== Hat-tricks ===
As of 9 September 2026

Player	For	Against	Result	Date
Artem Kozak	Epitsentr Kamianets-Podilskyi	Carbon Cherkasy	3–0 (A)	9 September 2026

== See also ==
- 2026–27 Ukrainian Premier League
- 2026–27 Ukrainian Second League
- 2026–27 Ukrainian First League
- 2026–27 Ukrainian Amateur Cup
- 2026–27 Ukrainian Women's Cup
- List of Ukrainian football transfers summer 2026
- List of Ukrainian football transfers winter 2026–27
