= 2026–27 Ukrainian Second League =

Ukrainian Second League
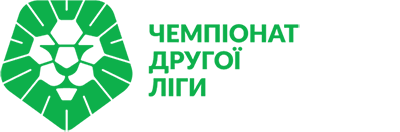
- Season: 2026–27
- Dates: 1 August 2026 – May 2027 (winter break: 29 November 2026 – 19 March 2027); May 2027 (play-offs)
- Teams: 18
- Matches: 24
- Goals: 79 (3.29 per match)
- Top goalscorer: Pavlo Fedosov, Ivan Zhumiha, Vasyl Palahnyuk (3 goals)
- Biggest home win: Bratslav 4–0 Sambir
- Biggest away win: Dinaz 2–6 Rukh
- Highest scoring: Dinaz 2–6 Rukh; Rebel 3–5 Carbon
- Longest winning run: 3 games Bratslav
- Longest unbeaten run: 3 games 4 teams
- Longest winless run: 3 games 3 teams
- Longest losing run: 2 games 2 teams
- Highest attendance: 342; Podillya 2–1 Nyva
- Lowest attendance: 0; 9 games (Note: at least for 2 games attendance was not reported)
- Total attendance: 2793
- Average attendance: 116
- All statistics correct as of As of 16 August 2026. Play-off statistics are not included.

The 2026–27 Ukrainian Second League is the 36th since its establishment. Due to regular airstrikes by the Russian Armed Forces, attendance restrictions were implemented, with many games played without spectators.

On 18 June 2026, the 36th PFL Conference determined the general composition of the competition and its format. Due to the withdrawal of a few more clubs, in mid of July the PFL central council confirmed the final composition and conducted a season's draw. As in the previous season, the competitions were planned to be held in two groups, split geographically, with both groups consisting of 9 each. The conference approved the admission of 4 amateur teams from the AAFU competition and 1 second team from the junior competitions.

The competitions were determined to start on 1 August 2026 and consist of a triple round robin format with two rounds held in summer-fall and one more in spring. It was also decided to preserve the post-season mini-tournaments, such as the first-place and third-place match-ups, as well as promotion/relegation between the first and the second leagues.

== Teams ==
=== Promoted teams ===
Four teams have been promoted from the 2025–26 Ukrainian Football Amateur League:

- Dnister Zalishchyky – 2nd place of Group 1 (returning, since 1993–94 season)
- Avanhard Lozova – 1st place of Group 2 (debut)
- Carbon Cherkasy – 5th place of Group 2 (debut)
- Bratslav Vinnytsia – 6th place of Group 2 (debut)

One second teams have been added:

- Poltava-2 – (debut, formed based on Poltava U-19 that competed in the Ukrainian Premier League last season)

=== Relegated teams ===
Two teams were relegated from the 2025–26 Ukrainian First League.

- Podillya Khmelnytskyi – 15th placed (returning, after five seasons)
- Metalurh Zaporizhia – 16th placed (returning, after four seasons)

One team was readmitted following withdrawal of the 2025–26 Ukrainian Premier League.

- Rukh Lviv – 14th placed (returning, after nine seasons)

=== Expelled and withdrawn teams ===
- Vorskla Poltava failed to receive the Professional Football League license for the next season.
- Chaika Petropavlivska Borshchahivka announced they are stopping their participation in professional competitions temporarily.
- Hirnyk-Sport Horishni Plavni temporarily withdrew due to financial issues.
- Real Pharma Odesa announced that it withdraws from professional competition and the next season will participate in the amateur competitions.
- FC Uzhhorod temporarily withdrew their first team from competition due to financial issues.
- Bukovyna-2 Chernivtsi announced that it withdraws their second team from the competition for the next season due to revival of the UPL under-21 competitions.
- Chornomorets-2 Odesa
- Livyi Bereh-2 Kyiv

=== Location map and stadiums ===
Home venues of teams in the 2026–27 Ukrainian Second League
— Group A — Group B
Home venues of teams in the 2026–27 Ukrainian Second League in Kyiv and Kyiv Oblast

==== Stadiums ====
Group A

Team	Stadium (Note: Minimum capacity of stadium for the Second League is 500 spectators.)	Position in 2025–26
Rukh Lviv	Arena Lviv	PL
Podillya Khmelnytskyi	Podillya SC	1L
Nyva Vinnytsia	Nyva training base	3rd
Sambir-Nyva-2 Ternopil	imeni Brovarskoho, Sambir	4th
Skala 1911 Stryi	Sokil	7th
Vilkhivtsi	Vilkhivtsi Arena	8th
Dinaz Vyshhorod	Dinaz Stadium, Demydiv	9th (Group B)
Bratslav Vinnytsia	Kolos, Stavyshche	AM
Dnister Zalishchyky	Dnister	AM

Group B

Team	Stadium	Position in 2025–26
Metalurh Zaporizhia	Slavutych Arena	1L
Rebel Kyiv	Tsentralnyi imeni Brukvenka, Makariv	4th
Atlet Kyiv	imeni Bannikova	5th (Group A)
Trostianets	imeni Kutsa	6th
Oleksandriya-2	Nika-plyus	7th
Penuel Kryvyi Rih	Hirnyk training base	10th
Avanhard Lozova	Livyi Bereh field 4, Hnidyn	AM
Carbon Cherkasy	LNZ training field, Heronymivka	AM
Poltava-2	Kremin Arena, Kremenchuk	—

Notes:

- [—] – The dash sign indicates that the club was admitted to the Second League without participation in the AAFU championship last season.
- PL – indicates participants of the 2025–26 Ukrainian Premier League
- 1L – indicates participants of the 2025–26 Ukrainian First League
- AM – indicates participants of the 2025–26 AAFU championship

== Managers ==
Club	Head coach	Replaced coach
Atlet Kyiv	Dmytro Murashenko	
Avanhard Lozova	Ihor Rakhayev	
Bratslav Vinnytsia	Vasyl Blinnikov	
Carbon Cherkasy	Ihor Stolovytskyi	
Dinaz Vyshhorod	Serhiy Datsenko	
Dnister Zalishchyky	Valeriy Ivashchenko	
Nyva Vinnytsia	Yuriy Yaroshenko	
Metalurh Zaporizhia	Serhiy Zaytsev	
Sambir-Nyva-2 Ternopil	Yaroslav Matviiv	
Oleksandriya-2	Viktor Bytsiura	
Penuel Kryvyi Rih	Ihor Solodenko	
Podillya Khmelnytskyi	Oleksandr Volovyk	
Poltava-2	Ihor Klymovskyi	
Rebel Kyiv	Maksym Demskyi	
Rukh Lviv	Bohdan Yesyp	
Skala 1911 Stryi	Vitaliy Shumskyi	
Trostianets	Yuriy Bakalov	
Vilkhivtsi	Oleksandr Semerenko	

=== Managerial changes ===
Team	Outgoing head coach	Manner of departure	Date of vacancy	Table	Incoming head coach	Date of appointment
Sambir-Nyva-2	Roman Marych			Pre-season	Yaroslav Matviiv	
Bratslav Vinnytsia	Vasyl Blinnikov			Pre-season	Yuriy Hura	11 March 2026
Poltava-2	new team			Pre-season	Ihor Klymovskyi	18 June 2026 (Note: Klymovskyi was a senior coach of Poltava U-19 during the 2025–26 UPL National League U-19. On 18 June 2026, former Poltava U-19 was admitted to the PFL Second League as Poltava-2.)
Rukh Lviv	new team			Pre-season	Bohdan Yesyp	19 June 2026 (Note: Rukh was reorganized based on their Rukh U-19 team which Yesyp coached; at the same time most of the players and the whole coaching staff of the first team left the club.)
Metalurh Zaporizhia	Serhiy Kovalets	Left the club	22 June 2026	Pre-season	Serhiy Zaytsev	24 June 2026
Dnister Zalishchyky	Oleh Krasnopyorov	Left the club	22 June 2026	Pre-season	Valeriy Ivashchenko	29 June 2026
Dinaz Vyshhorod	Oleksandr Holovko	Change of post	6 July 2026	Pre-season	Serhiy Datsenko	6 July 2026
Skala 1911 Stryi	Oleksandr Stepanov	Undisclosed	18 July 2026	Pre-season	Vitaliy Shumskyi	18 July 2026

== Group A league table ==
Pos	Team	Pld	W	D	L	GF	GA	GD	Pts	Promotion, qualification or relegation
1	Bratslav Vinnytsia	14	8	5	1	31	13	+18	29	Qualification to the league's title play-off
2	Nyva Vinnytsia	14	7	5	2	26	17	+9	26	Qualification to the third place play-off
3	Podillya Khmelnytskyi	14	8	1	5	26	23	+3	25	
4	Dnister Zalishchyky	15	7	3	5	26	23	+3	24	
5	Sambir-Nyva-2 Ternopil	14	6	3	5	20	20	0	21	
6	Vilkhivtsi	14	5	5	4	20	18	+2	20	
7	Skala 1911 Stryi	14	3	3	8	17	28	−11	12	
8	Rukh Lviv	14	2	3	9	19	25	−6	9 (Note: Ranked on head-to-head points: Rukh Lviv 4, Dinaz Vyshhorod 1)	
9	Dinaz Vyshhorod	15	1	6	8	19	37	−18	9	

Updated to match(es) played on unknown. Source: PFL.ua
Rules for classification: 1) Points; 2) Head-to-head points; 3) Head-to-head goal difference; 4) Head-to-head goals scored; 5) Goal difference in all games; 6) Goals scored in all games (Note: calculation by criteria indicated in rules 2, 3, 4 is conducted with consideration of all teams that have equal number of tournament points at the moment of calculation and not only among those which after preliminary criteria have appeared more successful).

=== Group A results ===
Home \ Away	BRA	DIN	DNI	NYV	POD	RUH	SN2	SKL	VLX	BRA	DIN	DNI	NYV	POD	RUH	SN2	SKL	VLX
Bratslav Vinnytsia		2–0	3–1	0–0	3–2	20/03	4–0	3–0	0–0									
Dinaz Vyshhorod	1–1		3–3	0–1	0–3	2–6	20/03	1–4	2–2									
Dnister Zalishchyky	3–3	1–0		28/11	3–2	0–1	1–1	3–1	3–1									
Nyva Vinnytsia	2–1	5–3	2–0		2–1	3–0 (Note: August 1, 2026 FC Nyva Vinnytsia - FC Rukh Lviv (2:1). According to the decision of the UAF's Control and Supervision Committee dated August 13, 2026, FC Rukh Lviv was awarded a technical defeat of 0:3 for the participation in the match of a football player whose name was not included in the match referee's report.)	4–1	20/03	2–2									
Podillya Khmelnytskyi	1–5	1–1	4–2	2–1		1–0	28/11	2–1	1–2									
Rukh Lviv	2–3	1–1	1–2	1–1	2–3		1–2	3–3	28/11									
Sambir-Nyva-2 Ternopil	1–1	1–2	1–0	3–0	1–2	1–0		0–1	0–0									
Skala 1911 Stryi	28/11	2–2	0–2	2–2	0–1	1–0	2–5		0–1									
Vilkhivtsi	0–2	4–1	0–2	1–1	20/03	2–1	2–3	3–0										

Updated to match(es) played on unknown. Source: pfl.ua (in Ukrainian)
Legend: Blue = home team win; Yellow = draw; Red = away team win.
Notes:

Additional notes:

=== Group A results by round ===
Team ╲ Round	1	2	3	4	5	6	7	8	9	10	11	12	13	14	15	16	17	18	19	20	21	22	23	24
Bratslav	W	W	W	D	W	D	W	W	W	D	D	L	D	W										
Dinaz	D	D	L	D	D	L	L	W	L	L	D	L	L	D	L									
Dnister	D	L	W	W	W	W	D	L	W	D	W	L	L	W	L									
Nyva V.	W	L	D	D	W	W	W	D	D	W	D	W	L	W										
Podillya	L	W	D	L	W	W	W	L	L	L	W	W	W	W										
Rukh	L	W	L	L	L	L	L	L	D	D	W	D	L	L										
SambirNT2	W	W	L	L	L	W	L	L	D	D	D	W	W	W										
Skala	D	L	W	W	L	L	L	D	W	L	L	D	L	L										
Vilkhivtsi	L	L	D	D	L	W	W	W	D	D	D	W	L	W										

Source: pfl.ua
W = Win; D = Draw; L = Loss

=== Group A position by week ===
Number = One or more less matches played per underline.
Positions are shown as of the end of the round.

Team ╲ Round	1	2	3	4	5	6	7	8	9	10	11	12	13	14	15	16	17	18	19	20	21	22	23	24	25	26	27
Bratslav	1	1	1	1	1	1	1	1	1	1	1	1	1	1	1	1											
Nyva V.	3	3	3	4	3	4	3	2	2	3	2	3	2	2	3	2											
Podillya	8	3	6	5	6	5	4	4	4	4	5	5	4	4	4	3											
Dnister	5	7	4	2	2	2	2	3	3	2	3	2	3	3	2	4											
SambirNT2	2	2	2	3	5	3	5	5	6	6	7	6	5	5	5	5											
Vilkhivtsi	7	9	9	9	9	9	7	6	5	5	4	4	6	6	6	6											
Skala	6	6	8	6	4	6	6	7	7	7	6	7	7	7	7	7											
Rukh	9	8	5	7	8	8	9	9	9	9	9	9	8	8	8	8											
Dinaz	4	5	7	8	7	7	8	8	8	8	8	8	9	9	9	9	9										

First match(es) will be played on ?. Source:
= Qualification to the league's title play-off; = Qualification to the third place play-off; = Last place

=== Group A goalscorers ===
As of 21 November 2026

Rank	Scorer	Team	Goals (Pen.)
1	Vasyl Palahnyuk	Dnister Zalishchyky	10 (1)
2	Daniil Savin	Dinaz Vyshhorod	7 (0)
3	Ruslan Palamar	Bratslav Vinnytsia	6 (0)
4	Ruslan Chernenko	Podillya Khmelnytskyi	5 (0)
5	Pavlo Fedosov	Bratslav Vinnytsia	4 (0)
5	Oleksandr Pyatov	Bratslav Vinnytsia	4 (0)
5	Nikita Dorosh	Dinaz Vyshhorod	4 (0)
5	Vladyslav Chaban	Podillya Khmelnytskyi	4 (0)
5	Ivan Zhumiha	Skala 1911 Stryi	4 (0)
6	6 player(s)		2
7	25 player(s)		1

- Own goals: Artur Ilyukhin (Podillya for Bratslav Vinnytsia)

=== Hat-tricks ===
As of 21 November 2026

Player	For	Against	Result	Date
(Ukraine) Daniil Savin	Dinaz Vyshhorod	Nyva Vinnytsia	3–5 (A)	21 November 2026

=== Group A clean sheets ===
As of 18 October 2026

Rank	Player	Club	Clean sheets
1	Valeriy Voskonyan	Bratslav Vinnytsia	6

== Group B league table ==
Pos	Team	Pld	W	D	L	GF	GA	GD	Pts	Promotion, qualification or relegation
1	Carbon Cherkasy	13	7	4	2	26	16	+10	25	Qualification to the league's title play-off
2	Atlet Kyiv	14	6	5	3	27	18	+9	23	Qualification to the third place play-off
3	Trostianets	15	6	5	4	23	15	+8	23	
4	Avanhard Lozova	15	6	3	6	15	15	0	21 (Note: Ranked on head-to-head points: Avanhard Lozova 3,Rebel Kyiv 0)	
5	Rebel Kyiv	13	6	3	4	24	17	+7	21	
6	Metalurh Zaporizhia	14	5	3	6	15	17	−2	18	
7	Oleksandriya-2	15	4	4	7	14	16	−2	16	
8	Poltava-2	14	4	3	7	13	18	−5	15	
9	Penuel Kryvyi Rih	14	3	2	9	11	36	−25	11	

Updated to match(es) played on unknown. Source: PFL.ua
Rules for classification: 1) Points; 2) Head-to-head points; 3) Head-to-head goal difference; 4) Head-to-head goals scored; 5) Goal difference in all games; 6) Goals scored in all games (Note: calculation by criteria indicated in rules 2, 3, 4 is conducted with consideration of all teams that have equal number of tournament points at the moment of calculation and not only among those which after preliminary criteria have appeared more successful).

=== Group B results ===
Home \ Away	ATL	AVL	CRB	MTZ	OL2	PEN	PL2	RBL	TRO	ATL	AVL	CRB	MTZ	OL2	PEN	PL2	RBL	TRO
Atlet Kyiv		1–0	2–2	2–3	2–0	20/03	4–2	2–3	1–1									
Avanhard Lozova	2–3		1–1	2–0	1–1	1–0	1–0	20/03	1–0									
Carbon Cherkasy	1–4	1–0		20/03	2–2	0–1	1–0	ppd	2–1									
Metalurh Zaporizhia	28/11	1–2	1–2		2–0	2–2	1–0	1–0	3–0									
Oleksandriya-2	2–1	3–1	0–1	0–0		3–0	20/03	1–1	0–1									
Penuel Kryvyi Rih	1–1	28/11	1–8	2–0	1–0		1–2	0–3	1–3									
Poltava-2	0–3	1–1	28/11	0–0	1–0	3–0		2–0	0–0									
Rebel Kyiv	0–0	1–2	3–5	2–1	2–1	4–0	3–0		28/11									
Trostianets	1–1	2–0	0–0	3–0	0–1	6–1	3–2	2–2										

Updated to match(es) played on unknown. Source: pfl.ua (in Ukrainian)
Legend: Blue = home team win; Yellow = draw; Red = away team win.

Additional notes:

=== Group B results by round ===
Team ╲ Round	1	2	3	4	5	6	7	8	9	10	11	12	13	14	15	16	17	18	19	20	21	22	23	24
Atlet	L	D	W	W	D	W	L	D	D	D	W	L	W	W										
Avanhard	L	D	L	L	W	W	W	W	W	L	L	D	D	W										
Carbon	L	W	D	W	D	D	W	W	W	-	W	D	L	W										
Metalurh Z.	D	D	D	L	L	L	W	L	W	W	L	W	W	L										
Oleksandriya2	W	D	D	W	L	D	D	L	L	L	W	L	W	L	L									
Penuel	W	L	D	L	L	L	L	D	L	L	W	W	L	L										
Poltava-2	D	W	W	D	L	L	L	W	L	W	L	L	D	L										
Rebel	W	L	L	W	W	D	D	L	-	D	W	L	W	W										
Trostianets	L	W	D	D	D	W	W	D	W	L	D	L	W	L	W									

Source: pfl.ua
W = Win; D = Draw; L = Loss

=== Group B position by week ===
Number= One and more less match played per underline. Positions are shown as of the end of the round.

Team ╲ Round	1	2	3	4	5	6	7	8	9	10	11	12	13	14	15	16	17	18	19	20	21	22	23	24	25	26	27
Carbon	8	3	5	7	5	4	5	1	1	1	1	1	1	1	1	1											
Atlet	7	8	8	6	4	3	1	3	3	2	6	6	2	4	3	2											
Trostianets	9	5	3	4	6	6	4	5	7	3	4	5	3	2	4	3											
Rebel	1	6	7	3	1	1	3	2	5	5	7	3	5	3	2	5											
Avanhard	6	9	9	9	9	7	7	6	2	4	2	2	4	5	5	4											
Metalurh Z.	4	7	6	8	8	8	9	8	8	8	5	8	6	7	6	6											
Oleksandriya2	2	2	2	1	3	2	2	4	6	7	8	7	8	6	7	7											
Poltava-2	5	1	1	2	2	5	6	7	4	6	3	4	7	8	8	8											
Penuel	3	4	4	5	7	8	8	9	9	9	9	9	9	9	9	9	9										

Qualification to the league's title play-off
Qualification to the third place play-off
Last place

=== Group B top goalscorers ===
As of 16 August 2026

Rank	Scorer	Team	Goals (Pen.)
1	Bohdan Bokulev	Penuel Kryvyi Rih	2 (0)
1	Vadym Chornyi	Carbon Cherkasy	2 (0)
1	Hlib Zinyar	Poltava-2	2 (0)
1	Andriy Bohdanov	Trostianets	2 (1)
5	22 player(s)		1
0	own goal(s)		0

- Own goal(s):

== The league's play-offs ==
=== Title play-off ===
Both groups' winners were expected to play each other for the season's title. Also, both these teams gained a direct promotion to the 2027–28 Ukrainian First League. At the same time, both groups' runners-up were expected to play among themselves for the season's third place and to play against the 13th- and 14th-placed teams in the Persha Liha (First League) for promotion.

Both matches, the league's final and third-place match, were played in a single-leg format and on a neutral field. A draw determined the hosting team for each match, which took place on May 15.

=== Promotion play-offs ===
The group runners-up were expected to qualify for the inter-tier promotion playoffs.

The relegation–promotion play-off games were expected to be scheduled to take place between the 13th and 14th-placed teams with the third and fourth-placed teams of the Second League.

== Awards ==
=== Round awards ===
Round	Player			Coach		
Round	Player	Club	Reference	Coach	Club	Reference
Round 1	Anton Dudik	Sambir-Nyva-2		Yuriy Hura	Bratslav Vinnytsia	
Round 2	Andriy Bohdanov	Trostianets		Yaroslav Matviiv	Sambir-Nyva-2	
Round 3						
Round 4						
Round 5						
Round 6						
Round 7						
Round 8						
Round 9						
Round 10						
Round 11						
Round 12						
Round 13						
Round 14						
Round 15						
Round 16						
Round 17						
Round 18						
Round 19						
Round 20						
Round 21						
winter break
Round 22						
Round 23						
Round 24						
Round 25						
Round 26						
Round 27						
Round 28						
Round 29						
Round 30						
Round 31						
Round 32						
Round 33						

== Number of teams by region ==
Number	Region	Team(s)
3	Lviv Oblast	Rukh Lviv, Sambir-Nyva-2 and Skala 1911 Stryi
2	Kyiv	Atlet and Rebel
2	Vinnytsia Oblast	Bratslav Vinnytsia and Nyva Vinnytsia
1	Dnipropetrovsk Oblast	Penuel Kryvyi Rih
1	Cherkasy Oblast	Carbon Cherkasy
1	Kharkiv Oblast	Avanhard Lozova
1	Khmelnytskyi Oblast	Podillya Khmelnytskyi
1	Kirovohrad Oblast	Oleksandriya-2
1	Kyiv Oblast	Dinaz Vyshhorod
1	Poltava Oblast	Poltava-2
1	Sumy Oblast	Trostianets
1	Ternopil Oblast	Dnister Zalishchyky
1	Zakarpattia Oblast	Vilkhivtsi
1	Zaporizhia Oblast	Metalurh Zaporizhia

== See also ==
- 2026–27 Ukrainian Cup
- 2026–27 Ukrainian Premier League
- 2026–27 Ukrainian First League
- 2026–27 Ukrainian Football Amateur League
- 2026–27 Ukrainian Premier League Under-21
- 2026–27 Ukrainian Women's Prime League
- 2026–27 Ukrainian Women's Higher League
- List of Ukrainian football transfers summer 2026
- List of Ukrainian football transfers winter 2026–27
