= 2026–27 Ukrainian Football Amateur League =

Ukrainian Football season

Ukrainian Amateur Football Championship
- Season: 2026–27
- Dates: Group stage: 15 August 2026 – May 2027; Winter break: 20 November 2026 – 27 March 2027; Play-offs: May – June 2027
- Teams: 18
- Final stage winner

The 2026–27 Ukrainian football championship among amateur teams is the 31st season since it replaced the physical culture teams' football championship. The Association of Amateur Football of Ukraine (AAFU) organizes the league competition.

== Teams ==
12 teams from last season reapplied for this season, including last season's winner, Ahrotekh Tyshkivka.

=== Returning/relegated clubs ===
- Real Pharma Odesa – (returning, last played during 2011 season)
- LSTM 536 Lutsk – (returning, last played during 2022–23 season)

=== Debut ===
List of teams that are debuting this season in the league:

- FC Borshchiv
- Palmira Odesa (late start, Sep 15)
- Budivelnyk Kremenchuk
- IRON Zaporizhia (late start)

=== Withdrawn teams ===
List of clubs that took part in last year's competition, but chose not to participate in the 2025–26 season:

- Korosten/Ahro-Nyva
- Standart Novi Sanzhary
- To4ka Odesa

List of clubs that withdrew during the season or right after it:

- Naftovyk Okhtyrka (after Round 1)

=== Location map ===
The following displays the location of teams.

Location of teams in the 2026-27 Ukrainian Amateur League
— Group A — Group B

== Group stage ==
=== Group 1 ===
Pos	Team	Pld	W	D	L	GF	GA	GD	Pts	Promotion, qualification or relegation
1	Kolos Polonne	10	6	0	4	10	6	+4	18	Qualification to final stage
2	Kormil Yavoriv	10	5	2	3	23	14	+9	17	Qualification to final stage
3	Mykolaiv	10	4	4	2	11	8	+3	16	Qualification to final stage
4	Borshchiv	10	4	3	3	10	10	0	15	Qualification to final stage
5	Mayak Sarny	10	3	5	2	14	11	+3	14	Qualification to final stage
6	VIVAD Romaniv	10	3	4	3	11	13	−2	13 (Note: Head-to-head points: VIVAD 3, Ahron 0.)	
7	Ahron Velyki Hayi	9	4	1	4	15	14	+1	13	
8	Kostopil	9	3	3	3	7	8	−1	12	
9	Trostianets	10	2	3	5	7	16	−9	9	
10	LSTM 536 Lutsk	10	1	3	6	11	19	−8	6	

Updated to match(es) played on 15 November 2026. Source: AAFU
Rules for classification: 1) Points; 2) Head-to-head points; 3) Head-to-head goal difference; 4) Head-to-head goals scored; 5) Goal difference; 6) Goals scored; 7) Draw of lots.
Notes:

Notes

- The round 1 game, Ahron vs Borshchiv, which was supposed to be held on August 16, was rescheduled to September 20.
- The round 7 game, Ahron vs Kostopil, which was supposed to be held on October 18, was rescheduled to November 15 and then later to March 28, 2027.
- The round 8 game, LSTM vs Ahron, which was supposed to be held on October 25, was rescheduled to a later date (November 15).

=== Group 2 ===
Pos	Team	Pld	W	D	L	GF	GA	GD	Pts	Promotion, qualification or relegation
1	Ahrotekh Tyshkivka	10	7	1	2	41	13	+28	22	Qualification to final stage
2	Rokyta	10	6	3	1	24	9	+15	21	Qualification to final stage
3	Palmira Odesa	11	5	2	4	29	24	+5	17	Qualification to final stage
4	Budivelnyk Kremenchuk	10	5	1	4	18	17	+1	16	
5	Olympia Savyntsi	9	4	3	2	12	13	−1	15	
6	IRON Zaporizhia	9	1	2	6	12	36	−24	5	
7	Real Pharma Odesa	11	0	2	9	12	36	−24	2	
-	Naftovyk Okhtyrka (Note: After losing 1:5 to Budivelnyk Kremenchuk Naftovyk Okhtyrka withdrew from the competition. All their results were annulled.)	0	0	0	0	0	0	0	0	Withdrawn

Updated to match(es) played on 19 November 2026. Source: AAFU
Rules for classification: 1) Points; 2) Head-to-head points; 3) Head-to-head goal difference; 4) Head-to-head goals scored; 5) Goal difference; 6) Goals scored; 7) Draw of lots.
Notes:

Notes

- Due to the late start of IRON, as well as the withdrawal of Naftovyk, the round 1 game Budivelnyk vs IRON was postponed to September 20. Round 1 was held on August 16.
- The round 3 game, IRON vs Olympia, which was scheduled to take place on September 6, was rescheduled and postponed to the next half of the season.
- The round 5 game, IRON vs Ahrotekh, which was scheduled to take place on September 26, was postponed due to an extended air raid siren and played on November 8.

== Number of teams by region ==
Number	Region	Team(s)
3	Poltava Oblast	Budivelnyk Kremenchuk, Olimpiya Savyntsi, Rokyta
2	Lviv Oblast	Kormil Yavoriv, Mykolaiv
2	Odesa Oblast	Palmira Odesa, Real Pharma Odesa
2	Rivne Oblast	Kostopil, Mayak Sarny
2	Ternopil Oblast	Ahron Velyki Hayi, Borshchiv
2	Volyn Oblast	LSTM 536 Lutsk, Trostianets
1	Kirovohrad Oblast	Ahrotekh Tyshkivka
1	Khmelnytskyi Oblast	Kolos Polonne
1	Sumy Oblast	Naftovyk Okhtyrka
1	Zaporizhia Oblast	IRON Zaporizhia
1	Zhytomyr Oblast	Vivad Romaniv

== See also ==
- 2026–27 Ukrainian Second League
- 2026–27 Ukrainian First League
- 2026–27 Ukrainian Premier League
- 2026–27 Ukrainian Amateur Cup
- 2026–27 Ukrainian Premier League Under-21
- 2026–27 Ukrainian Women's First League
- List of Ukrainian football transfers summer 2026
- List of Ukrainian football transfers winter 2026–27
