= Football Association of Sumy Oblast =

Football Association of Sumy Oblast is a football governing body in the region of Sumy Oblast, Ukraine. The association is a member of the Regional Council of UAF and the collective member of the UAF itself.

The regional championships and cup competitions are officially conducted since 1952.

The first mentioning of football game on territory of Sumy Oblast is traced to 1916 when the local daily newspaper "Sumskyi Visnyk" (Sumy Herald) on 25 May 1916 published an article about a tournament or collection of exhibition games where local team of Slavia played against some weaker local teams. On 1 June 1916 the same newspaper published an article about another game of Slavia against visiting Feniks from Kharkiv where the local team was victorious 4:3. The article also mentioned that Slavia played against another Kharkiv team in 1915. At that time Sumy Oblast did not exist and its territory was part of Chernigov Governorate and Kharkov Governorate.

There is information that football regional championships were conducted as soon as there was created Sumy Oblast in 1939. However, there is not enough information available about earlier championships.

== Previous Champions ==
- 1952 Mashynobudivnyk Sumy (1)
- 1953 Torpedo Sumy (1)
- 1954 Torpedo Sumy (2)
- 1955 Khimik Shostka (1)
- 1956 Nasosnyk Sumy (1)
- 1957 Burevisnyk Shostka (1)
- 1958 Nasosnyk Sumy (2)
- 1959 Avanhard Shostka (1)
- 1960 Avanhard Konotop (1)
- 1961 Ekran Shostka (1)
- 1962 SVADKU Sumy (1)
- 1963 Torpedo Sumy (3)
- 1964 Elektron Romny (1)
- 1965 Ekran Shostka (2)
- 1966 Kharchovyk Sumy (1)
- 1967 Kharchovyk Sumy (2)
- 1968 Shakhtar Konotop (1)
- 1969 Kharchovyk Sumy (3)
- 1970 SVADKU Sumy (2)
- 1971 Frunzenets Sumy (1)
- 1972 Frunzenets Sumy (2)
- 1973 Frunzenets Sumy (3)
- 1974 Svema Shostka (1)
- 1975 Frunzenets Sumy (4)
- 1976 Elektron Romny (2)
- 1977 Frunzenets Sumy (5)
- 1978 Frunzenets Sumy (6)
- 1979 Frunzenets Sumy (7)
- 1980 Frunzenets Sumy (8)
- 1981 Frunzenets Sumy (9)
- 1982 Lyvarnyk Sumy (1)
- 1983 Spartak Okhtyrka (1)
- 1984 Yavir Krasnopillya (1)
- 1985 Frunzenets Sumy (10)
- 1986 Avtomobilist Sumy (1)
- 1987 Frunzenets Sumy (11)
- 1988 FC Mayak Sumy (1)
- 1989 Frunzenets Sumy (12)
- 1990 Avtomobilist Sumy (2)
- 1991 Viktoriya Lebedyn (1)
- =independence of Ukraine=
- 1992 Syrzavod Hlukhiv (1)
- 1993 Spartak Okhtyrka (2)
- 1994 Svema Shostka (2)
- 1995 FC Shostka (3)
- 1995-96 Elektron Romny (3)
- 1996-97 Kharchovyk Popivka (1)
- 1997-98 Naftovyk-2 Okhtyrka (1)
- 1998-99 Frunzenets Sumy (13)
- 2000 Elektron-2 Romny (1)
- 2001 Shakhtar Konotop (2)
- 2002 Naftovyk-2 Okhtyrka (2)
- 2003 Naftovyk-2 Okhtyrka (3)
- 2004 Shakhtar Konotop (3)
- 2005 Naftovyk-2 Okhtyrka (4)
- 2006 Shakhtar Konotop (4)
- 2007 Shakhtar Konotop (5)
- 2008 Naftovyk-2 Okhtyrka (5)
- 2009 Shakhtar Konotop (6)
- 2010 ONPR–Ukrnafta Okhtyrka (6)
- 2011 FC Druzhba(1)
- 2012 Shakhtar Konotop (7)
- 2013 ONPR–Ukrnafta Okhtyrka (7)
- =Russo-Ukrainian War=
- 2014 Ahrobiznes TSK Romny (1)
- 2015 Ahrobiznes TSK Romny (2)
- 2016 Ahrobiznes TSK Romny (3)
- 2017 Ahrobiznes TSK Romny (4)
- 2018 Alians Lypova Dolyna (1)
- 2019 LS Group Verkhnya Syrovatka (1)
- 2020 Trostianets (1)
- 2021 Veleten Hlukhiv (1)
- =full-scale Russian invasion=
- 2017 Naftovyk Okhtyrka (8)
- 2017 Naftovyk Okhtyrka (9)
- 2017 Ukrayina Tokari (1)

=== Top winners ===
- 13 – Frunzenets Sumy
- 9 – ONPR–Ukrnafta (Naftovyk-2) Okhtyrka
- 7 – Shakhtar Konotop
- 4 – Elektron Romny (including Elektron-2)
- 4 – Ahrobiznes TSK Romny
- 3 – 3 clubs (Torpedo, Kharchovyk S., (Svema) Shostka)
- 2 – 4 clubs (Nasosnyk, Ekran, SVADKU, Avtomobilist)
- 1 – 14 clubs

== Professional clubs ==
- FC Frunzenets-Liha-99 Sumy (Avangard, Spartak), 1960-1983, 2000-2002 (26 seasons)
- FC Naftovyk Okhtyrka, 1986-2018 (33 seasons)
- FC Ahrotekhservis Sumy (Avtomobilist, SBTS), 1991-1996 (6 seasons)

- FC Elektron Romny, 1992–2004 (13 seasons)
- FC Spartak Sumy (Yavir Krasnopillia), 1992–2007 (16 seasons)
- FC Slovianets Konotop, 1997–1998 (a season)
- PFC Sumy (Yavir Krasnopillia), 2002–2019 (17 seasons)
- FC Barsa Sumy, 2015–2016 (a season)
- FC Alians Lypova Dolyna, 2019–2022 (2 seasons)
- FC Trostianets, 2021–2022, 2023– (3 seasons)
- FC Sumy, 2021–2022 (a season)
- FC Viktoriya Sumy, 2021–2022, 2023– (3 seasons)

== Other clubs at national/republican level ==
Note: the list includes clubs that played at republican competitions before 1959 and the amateur or KFK competitions after 1964.

- Sumy, 1936–1938
- Shostka, 1937
- Konotop, 1937, 1938, 1952
- Tsukrovyk Sumy, 1939, 1940
- Dynamo Sumy, 1946–1948
- Mashynobudivnyk Sumy, 1948, 1949, 1951, 1952
- Khimik Shostka, 1948, 1949, 1957, 1970, 1977
- Lokomotyv Konotop, 1948, 1949
- Spartak Sumy, 1949
- Torpedo Sumy, 1953–1959
- Shakhtar Konotop, 1958, 1959, 1965, 1969
- Avanhard Shostka, 1958, 1959
- Avanhard Sumy, 1959
- Elektron Romny, 1964, 1988 – 1991, 1995/96, 1996/97
- Spartak Krolevets, 1966
- Kharchovyk Sumy, 1967
- Sumy Oblast, 1968
- Frunzenets Sumy, 1971 – 1974, 1979, 1980, 1986, 1988, 1999, 2000
- Svema Shostka, 1974, 1975, 1978, 1994/95
- Naftovyk/Naftovyk-2 Okhtyrka, 1982 – 1985, 1992/93 – 1994/95, 2002, 2003, 2021/22 – 2024/25
- Lyvarnyk Sumy, 1983, 1984
- Yavir Krasnopillia, 1985 – 1987, 1989 – 1991, 2001, 2002
- Avtomobilist Sumy, 1987, 1990
- Khimik Bezdryk, 1988, 1989
- Mayak Sumy, 1989
- Khimik Sumy, 1990, 1991
- Spartak Hlukhiv, 1990
- Viktoria Lebedyn, 1991
- Budivelnyk Sumy, 1991 – 1994/95
- Esman Hlukhiv, 1992/93
- Slovianets Konotop, 1992/93, 1993/94, 1996/97, 1998/99, 2006
- Kharchovyk Popivka, 1993/94, 1994/95, 1996/97 – 1998/99
- Barsa Sumy, 2013
- Viktoria Mykolaivka, 2016/17 – 2020/21
- Ahrobiznes Romny, 2017/18
- Alians Lypova Dolyna, 2018/19
- Trostianets, 2019/20, 2020/21
- FC Sumy, 2020/21

== See also ==
- FFU Council of Regions
