= 2015 Football Championship of Sumy Oblast =

Football Championship of Sumy Oblast
- Season: 2015
- Champions: Ahrobiznes-TSK Romny

The 2015 Football Championship of Sumy Oblast was won by Ahrobiznes-TSK Romny.

== League table ==
Pos	Team	Pld	W	D	L	GF	GA	GD	Pts
1	Ahrobiznes-TSK Romny (C)	18	16	2	0	73	9	+64	50
2	Viktoria Zhovtneve	18	12	2	4	36	11	+25	38
3	Veleten-Spartak Hlukhiv	18	10	3	5	38	24	+14	33
4	Naftovyk-2 Okhtyrka	18	9	6	3	36	14	+22	33
5	Lokomotyv Krolevets	18	8	4	6	30	19	+11	28
6	SumDU-2 Sumy	18	7	3	8	24	35	−11	24
7	Barsa-98 Sumy	18	6	3	9	28	33	−5	21
8	Spartak-SumBud Sumy	18	4	2	12	19	45	−26	14
9	Kobra Sumy (Note: withdrew after Round 9.) (W)	18	3	2	13	11	48	−37	11
10	Kobra-SNAU Sumy (W)	18	0	1	17	5	62	−57	1

Source: "Итоги областных чемпионатов Украины 2015. Восток". UA-Football.
(C) Champions; (W) Withdrew
Notes:

Notes:

- In table number of losses is more by two as in the game between Kobra Sumy and Kobra-SNAU Sumy both teams received losses twice.
