= Olimp Stadium =

Stadium in Oleksandriia, Ukraine

KSK Olimp Stadium
- КСК "Олімп"
- Interactive map of KSK Olimp Stadium
- Location: Budivelnykiv Avenue, 30 Oleksandriia, Ukraine
- Coordinates: 48°39′52.9″N 33°04′06.8″E
- Capacity: 2,640
- Field size: 105 m × 68 m (344 ft × 223 ft)

Construction
- Opened: 25 May 1991; 35 years ago

Tenants
- Oleksandriya-2 (2024–present); Oleksandriya junior squads and Academy

Olimp Stadium (Ukrainian: стадіон КСК "Олімп") is a football stadium in Oleksandriia, Ukraine. It is the home stadium of Oleksandriya-2 who play in the Ukrainian Second League.

The cultural and sports complex Olimp was opened on 25 May 1991. It is located in Peremoha district of the city. Stadium has a covered stand, VIP area, press-box, covered futsal field with artificial turf, small gym and other facilities. It is a Ukrainian Association of Football Category 1 stadium. Oleksandriya-2 will play its home matches in the stadium starting in the 2024–25 season.
