= FC Carbon Cherkasy =

Football club based in Cherkasy

- Founded: 2016
- Ground: Cherkasy Arena; LNZ training base in Heronymivka
- Capacity: 10,321
- President: Narek Kazaryan
- Head coach: Ihor Stolovytskyi
- League: Ukrainian Amateur League
- 2025–26: 5th placed in Group 2
- Website: https://fccarbon.team/

FC Carbon Cherkasy (Ukrainian: ФК «Карбон» Черкаси), is a football club based in Cherkasy, Ukraine.

== Overview ==
The club was established in 2016. At first the club played in the city futsal competition, later transitioned to actual association football. Carbon is named after their initial sponsor, which specializes in the distribution of crude oil products.

In 2024, Carbon participated in the 2024 PFL open tournament. Later that year, they took part in the 2024–25 Ukrainian Amateur Cup, but were eliminated in the first round by Standart Novi Sanzhary. In 2025, Carbon made their debut at the national amateur level, 2025–26 Ukrainian Football Amateur League. That same year, the club participated in the 2025–26 Ukrainian Cup where they were eliminated by the former UPL club, Inhulets Petrove, 1:2. They also took part in the 2025–26 Ukrainian Amateur Cup, where in the Round of 16 were eliminated by Olympiya Savyntsi 2:6 on aggregate. They finished the 2025–26 Ukrainian Football Amateur League in fifth place in their group among nine participants.

Since April of 2026, Carbon has been building their own stadium, "City-Arena", which will be based on a former Stadion Temp in Cherkasy. In the summer of 2026, it was confirmed that Carbon has been admitted to the 2026–27 Ukrainian Second League. On 1 August 2026, Carbon played their first game at professional level hosting Penuel Kryvyi Rih. They lost that game 0:1.

== Honors ==
Cherkasy Oblast football championship

- Winners (2): 2023–24, 2024–25

Cherkasy Oblast Cup

- Winners (1): 2024

== League and cup history ==
Season	Div.	Pos.	Pl.	W	D	L	GS	GA	P	Domestic Cup	Europe		Notes
2025–26	4th (Amateur League:Group 2)	5_{/9}	16	8	1	7	39	35	25	Round of 64 (1/32)	-	-	Admission to Ukrainian Second League
2026–27	3th (Second League:Group B)	1_{/9}	10	6	3	1	23	11	21	Round of 32 (1/16)	-	-	TBD
