= Illya Badenko =

Ukrainian footballer (born 2005)

Personal information
- Full name: Illya Vadymovych Badenko
- Date of birth: 31 March 2005 (age 21)
- Place of birth: Kherson, Ukraine
- Height: 1.79 m (5 ft 10 in)
- Position: Midfielder

Team information
- Current team: Kudrivka U21
- Number: 22

Youth career
- 2018–2019: Krystal Kherson
- 2019–2022: Dnipro
- 2022–2024: Dnipro-1

Senior career*
Years	Team	Apps	(Gls)
2024	Dnipro-1	1	(0)
2024–	Oleksandriya	0	(0)
2024–2026	→ Oleksandriya-2	14	(0)
2026–	Kudrivka U21	12	(1)

International career^{‡}
2024	Ukraine U19	2	(0)
- * Club domestic league appearances and goals as of 31 December 2024 ‡ National team caps and goals as of 8 October 2024

Illya Vadymovych Badenko (Ukrainian: Ілля Вадимович Баденко; born 31 March 2005) is a Ukrainian professional footballer who plays as a midfielder for Kudrivka U21.

== Club career ==
Born in Kherson, Badenko began his career in the Krystal Kherson academy, then he continued in the Dnipro and Dnipro-1, joining latter in August 2022, where he played in the Ukrainian Premier League Reserves.

He made his debut as a second half-time substituted player for Dnipro-1 in the Ukrainian Premier League in an away match against LNZ Cherkasy on 12 March 2024.

== International career ==
In March 2024, Melnychenko was called up by manager Dmytro Mykhaylenko to the final squad of the Ukraine national under-19 football team to play in the 2024 UEFA European Under-19 Championship elit round matches.
