= Daniil Savin =

Ukrainian footballer (born 2005)

Personal information
- Full name: Daniil Artemovych Savin
- Date of birth: 29 June 2005 (age 21)
- Place of birth: Luhansk, Ukraine
- Height: 1.72 m (5 ft 8 in)
- Position: Right winger

Team information
- Current team: Dinaz Vyshhorod
- Number: 14

Youth career
- 2017–2022: Mariupol

Senior career*
Years	Team	Apps	(Gls)
2021–2022	Mariupol	1	(0)
2025–2026	Bukovyna-2 Chernivtsi	25	(3)
2026–	Dinaz Vyshhorod	14	(7)
- * Club domestic league appearances and goals as of 21 November 2026

Daniil Artemovych Savin (Ukrainian: Данііл Артемович Савін; born 29 June 2005) is a Ukrainian professional footballer who plays as a right winger for Ukrainian club Bukovyna-2 Chernivtsi in Ukrainian Second League.

== Career ==
=== Mariupol ===
Savin is a product of Mariupol, where on 18 September 2021, he made his debut in Ukrainian Second League against Shakhtar Donetsk. With this debut, Sabin became the youngest player to debut in the Ukrainian championship, at the age of 16 years and 81 days, breaking the record set by Mykola Shaparenko six years earlier. In the summer of 2022, Mariupol would indeed be dissolved, Savin became a free agent and a couple of months later moved to Shakhtar, where he played 26 games in a year and a half in the Under-19 championship.

=== Bukovyna-2 Chernivtsi ===
In summer 2025 he moved to Bukovyna-2 Chernivtsi in Ukrainian Second League. On 27 September 2025, he scored the winning goal against Polissya-2 Zhytomyr in which the Bukovyna-2 Chernivtsi won 1-0. Due to his performance, he was included in the Best XI of Round 10 of the 2025–26 Ukrainian Second League. On 13 November 2025, he scored against Real Pharma Odesa. in Odessa.

On 4 July 2026, he was invited by FC Chernihiv to play a friendly match against Lokomotiv Kiev at the Chernihiv Arena in Chernihiv.

=== Dinaz Vyshhorod ===
Recently he signed for Dinaz Vyshhorod and on 14 August 2026 he scored against Rukh Lviv.

== Career statistics ==
As of match played 21 November 2026

Appearances and goals by club, season and competition
Club	Season	League			Cup		Europe		Other		Total	
Club	Season	Division	Apps	Goals	Apps	Goals	Apps	Goals	Apps	Goals	Apps	Goals
Mariupol	2021–22	Ukrainian Premier League	1	0	0	0	0	0	0	0	1	0
Bukovyna-2 Chernivtsi	2025–26	Ukrainian Second League	25	3	0	0	0	0	0	0	25	3
Dinaz Vyshhorod	2026–27	Ukrainian Second League	14	7	1	0	0	0	0	0	15	7
Career total			40	10	1	0	0	0	0	0	41	10
