= 2019 Football Championship of Sumy Oblast =

Football Championship of Sumy Oblast
- Season: 2019
- Champions: LS Group Verkhnia Syrovatka

The 2019 Football Championship of Sumy Oblast was won by LS Group Verkhnia Syrovatka.

Just after the winter break on 4 March 2020 LS Group Verkhnia Syrovatka switched their name to FC Sumy and expressed their intention to play at national amateur competitions.

== League table ==
Pos	Team	Pld	W	D	L	GF	GA	GD	Pts
1	LS Group Verkhnia Syrovatka (C)	16	14	0	2	51	12	+39	42
2	FC Trostianets-2	16	13	0	3	54	9	+45	39
3	Veleten Hlukhiv	16	11	2	3	46	18	+28	35
4	FC Krolevets	16	8	3	5	18	16	+2	27
5	FC Trostianets	16	8	3	5	44	18	+26	27
6	Hranum Snizhky	16	4	1	11	22	38	−16	13
7	FC Romny	16	3	3	10	20	36	−16	12
8	FC Druzhba (Note: For no show FC Druzhba received a technical loss and was penalized with 3 points deduction.)	16	2	2	12	12	54	−42	5
9	FC Shostka	16	1	2	13	8	74	−66	5

Source: "Чемпіонат області". Football Federation of Sumy Oblast. Archived from the original on 2019-10-09.
(C) Champions
