= 2026–27 Ukrainian Amateur Cup =

2026–27 Ukrainian Cup for amateur teams
Tournament details
- Country: Ukraine
- Dates: 26 August 2026 – May 2027
- Teams: 22
- Ukrainian Cup qualification: TBD

The 2026–27 Ukrainian Amateur Cup is the 31st season of the national football cup competition for amateur teams. Twenty-two teams were admitted to the competition, including 15 teams, which previously has competed before. It is few teams less than the previous season.

The defending champions Avanhard Lozova do not participate, having been admitted to professional football last season.

== Participated clubs ==
In bold are clubs that are active in the same season of the AAFU championship (parallel round-robin competition).

- Dnipropetrovsk Oblast (1): Oril Tsarychanka
- Khmelnytskyi Oblast (1): **Kolos Polonne**
- Kirovohrad Oblast (1): **Ahrotekh Tyshkivka**
- Kyiv (1): Tytan Kyiv
- Kyiv Oblast (2): Bucha Fortuna, Sokil Mykhailivka-Rubezhivka
- Lviv Oblast (4): **Kormil Yavoriv**, Mostyska, **Mykolaiv**, Piatnychany
- Odesa Oblast (2): **Real Pharma Odesa**, To4ka Odesa
- Poltava Oblast (3): **Budivelnyk Kremenchuk**, **Olympiya Savyntsi**, **Rokyta**
- Rivne Oblast (4): **Kostopil**, Lehion Dubno, **Mayak Sarny**, Novozhukiv
- Ternopil Oblast (1): Buchach
- Volyn Oblast (1): Dukhche
- Zhytomyr Oblast (1): Korosten/Ahro-Nyva

Notes

- Teams that were simultaneously competing in the 2026–27 Ukrainian Cup: Ahrotekh Tyshkivka (AAFU), Kolos Polonne, Mykolaiv, Novozhukiv, Olympiya Savyntsi (AAFU), Rokyta (AAFU), To4ka Odesa (AAFU)
- All league teams (AAFU championship) received a bye to the Round of 16: Ahrotekh Tyshkivka, Budivelnyk Kremenchuk, Kolos Polonne, Kormil Yavoriv, FC Kostopil, Mayak Sarny, FC Mykolaiv, Olympia Savyntsi, Real Pharma Odesa, FC Rokyta
- Debuting teams: FC Buchach, FC Dukhche, Kolos Polonne, Lehion Dubno, FC Mostyska, FC Novozhukiv, Real Pharma Odesa

== Bracket ==
The following is the bracket that demonstrates the last four rounds of the Ukrainian Cup, including the final match. Numbers in parentheses next to the match score represent the results of a penalty shoot-out.

Round of 16
FC Mykolaiv	1	1	2
FC Kostopil	0	0	0
Kormil Yavoriv	2	3	5
FC Novozhukiv	1	0	1
Kolos Polonne	4	2	6
FC Mostyska	0	0	0
Mayak Sarny	0	2	2
FC Pyatnychany	1	0	1
Budivelnyk Kremenchuk	3	4	7
Real Pharma Odesa	0	0	0
Olympia Savyntsi (a.e.t.)	1	2	3
Korosten/Ahro-Nyva	1	1	2
FC Rokyta	1	2	3 (2)
Bucha Fortuna (p)	0	3	3 (4)
Tytan Kyiv	1	1	2
Ahrotekh Tyshkivka	0	0	0

Quarter-finals
FC Mykolaiv	2	2	4
Kormil Yavoriv	0	1	1
Kolos Polonne	1	1	2
Mayak Sarny	0	3	3
Budivelnyk Kremenchuk	0	0	0
Olympia Savyntsi	3	3	6
Bucha Fortuna	1	1	2
Tytan Kyiv	2	3	5

Semi-finals
FC Mykolaiv
Mayak Sarny
Olympia Savyntsi
Tytan Kyiv

Final
May – Kyiv

== Results ==
=== Preliminary round ===
The first leg was played on 26 September. The second leg was played on 2 September.

Team 1	Agg.	Team 2	1st leg	2nd leg
First leg – August 26, Second leg – September 2
FC Pyatnychany	8 – 0	FC Buchach	5–0 (Note: The match took place at Stadion "Sokil" in Stryi.)	3–0
FC Novozhukiv	6 – 0	FC Dukhche	0–0 (Note: The match took place at Stadion "Zhuky" in Zorya.)	6–0 (Note: The match took place at Stadion "DYuSSh" in Rozhyshche.)
Korosten/Ahro-Nyva	3 – 2	Sokil Mykhailivka-Rubezhivka	0–0	3–2 (Note: Originally scheduled to take place on September 2, the game Korosten/Ahro-Nyva vs Sokil was postponed at a score of 0–0 due to the extended air raid alerts.)
Bucha Fortuna	7 – 1	To4ka Odesa	2–1	5–0
Oril Tsarychanka	0 – 14	Tytan Kyiv	0–5 (Note: The match took place at Stadion "Litsei No.21" in Kamianske.)	0–9
First leg – September 2, Second leg – September 9
Lehion Dubno	1 – 8	FC Mostyska	1–2	0–6

=== Round of 16 ===
The first leg was played on 16 September. The second leg was played on 23 September.

Team 1	Agg.	Team 2	1st leg	2nd leg
First leg – September 16, Second leg – September 23
FC Mykolaiv	2 – 0	FC Kostopil	1–0	1–0
Kormil Yavoriv	5 – 1	FC Novozhukiv	2–1	3–0 (Note: The match took place at Stadion "Zhuky" in Zorya.)
Mayak Sarny	2 – 1	FC Pyatnychany	0–1	2–0
Kolos Polonne	6 – 0	FC Mostyska	4–0	2–0
Olympia Savyntsi	3 – 2	Korosten/Ahro-Nyva	1–1	2–1 (a.e.t.)
FC Rokyta	3 – 3 (2–4 p)	Bucha Fortuna	1–0	2–3 (a.e.t.)
Tytan Kyiv	2 – 0	Ahrotekh Tyshkivka	1–0	1–0
First leg – September 16, Second leg – September 30
Budivelnyk Kremenchuk	7 – 0	Real Pharma Odesa	3–0	4–0

=== Quarter-finals ===
The first leg was played on 7 October. The second leg was played on 14 October.

Team 1	Agg.	Team 2	1st leg	2nd leg
First leg – October 7, Second leg – October 14
FC Mykolaiv	4 – 1	Kormil Yavoriv	2–0	2–1
Kolos Polonne	2 – 3	Mayak Sarny	1–0	1–3
Budivelnyk Kremenchuk	0 – 6	Olympia Savyntsi	0–3	0–3
First leg – October 14, Second leg – October 21
Bucha Fortuna	2 – 5	Tytan Kyiv	1–2	1–3

=== Semi-finals ===
The semifinal matches are scheduled for 2027.

Team 1	Agg.	Team 2	1st leg	2nd leg
FC Mykolaiv	Match 1	Mayak Sarny		
Olympia Savyntsi	Match 2	Tytan Kyiv		

== See also ==
- 2026–27 Ukrainian Cup
- 2026–27 Ukrainian Football Amateur League
- 2026–27 Ukrainian Women's Cup
