= Ihor Stolovytskyi =

Ukrainian footballer (born 1969)

Personal information
- Full name: Ihor Mykhaylovych Stolovytskyi
- Date of birth: 29 August 1969 (age 57)
- Place of birth: Cherkasy, Ukrainian SSR
- Height: 1.74 m (5 ft 9 in)
- Position: Midfielder

Team information
- Current team: Karbon Cherkasy

Youth career
- Cherkasy sports school 1
- Kharkiv sports boarding school

Senior career*
Years	Team	Apps	(Gls)
1986–1989	Torpedo Ryazan	117	(11)
1990–1995	Shakhtar Donetsk	114	(7)
1995	Torpedo Zaporizhzhia	16	(0)
1996	Spartak Ryazan	31	(6)
1997–2000	Cherkasy	138	(13)
2001–2004	Zirka Kirovohrad	87	(8)
2004–2005	Cherkasy	7	(0)
Total		510	(45)

International career
1986	Soviet Union U18		

Managerial career
- 2008–2009: Dnipro Cherkasy (assistant)
- 2012–2013: Zoria Biloziria
- 2014: Slavutych Cherkasy (assistant)
- 2014–2016: Cherkaskyi Dnipro
- 2017–2018: Cherkaskyi Dnipro
- 2018–2019: Kremin Kremenchuk
- 2020–2021: Dnipro Cherkasy
- 2021: Kremin Kremenchuk
- 2023–: Karbon Cherkasy
- * Club domestic league appearances and goals

Ihor Mykhaylovych Stolovytskyi (Ukrainian: Ігор Михайлович Столовицький; born 29 August 1969) is a Ukrainian football coach and former player.

== Career ==
Stolovytskyi started his football career in his home city of Cherkasy, attending Cherkasy Sports School No. 1 (DYuSSh No. 1). Later, as a young footballer, he moved to Kharkiv, where he attended the local sports boarding school.

Stolovytskyi made his professional debut while playing in the Russian SFSR for Spartak Ryazan in the 1986 Soviet Second League. He spent 4 seasons at the Ryazan team of masters, which several times had changed their name (Sapfir and later Torpedo). In 1990, the Shakhtar head coach, Valeriy Yaremchenko, invited him to Donetsk.

Eventually, he worked as a manager of FC Cherkaskyi Dnipro and previously played for Dnipro Cherkasy.
