= FC Oleksandriya-2 =

Professional football club based in Oleksandriia, Ukraine

Oleksandriya-2
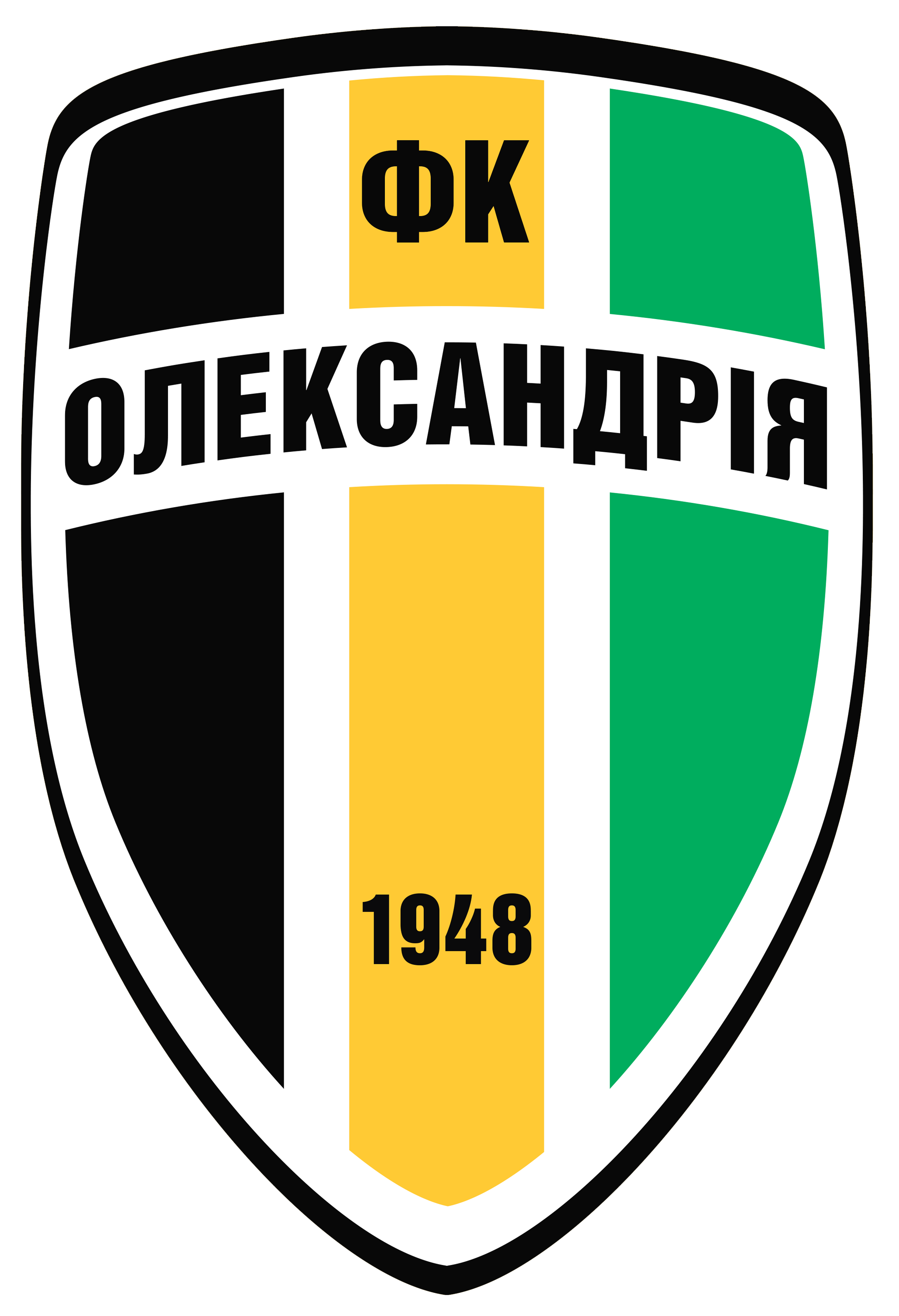
- Full name: Футбольний клуб Олександрія-2; Football Club Oleksandriya-2
- Founded: 13 June 2024; 2 years ago
- Ground: Olimp Stadium, Oleksandriia
- Capacity: 2,640
- Owner(s): Serhiy Kuzmenko (honorary president); UkrAhroKom (98.5%); AhroVista (1.5%)
- General Director: Ivan Kuzmenko
- Manager: Viktor Bytsyura
- League: Ukrainian Second League
- Website: http://fco.com.ua/
Home colours	Away colours

Football Club Oleksandriya-2 is a Ukrainian football team based in Oleksandriia, Ukraine, and it serves as a junior team for the FC Oleksandriya. Like most tributary teams, the best players are sent up to the senior team, meanwhile developing other players for further call-ups.

== History ==
Oleksandriya-2 was created on 6 June 2024 before the start of 2024–25 Ukrainian Second League season.

== League and cup history ==
Season	Div.	Pos.	Pl.	W	D	L	GS	GA	P	Domestic Cup	Europe		Notes
2024–25	3th (Second League:Group B)	4_{/10}	18	7	7	4	30	19	28	-	-	-	-
2025–26	3th (Second League:Group B)	7_{/11}	30	12	8	10	37	32	44	-	-	-	-
2026–27	3th (Second League:Group B)	TBD	1	1	0	0	1	0	3	-	-	-	TBD

Previously under the name of Polihraftekhnika, there existed Polihraftekhnika-2 in 1990s. It competed in at regional level and the Ukrainian Association of Amateur Football (AAFU). For a little while it was also known as Polihraftekhnika-Krystal. In 2000s there existed a separate farm club Oleksandriya-Ametyst which was based on a local football academy "Ametyst". That team also competed at regional level and AAFU. Sometime in 2012–2014 Oleksandriya cooperated with UkrAhroKom Holovkivka. The team from Holovkivka reached the Ukrainian First League before officially merging with FC Oleksandriya as part of reorganization in 2014.

Oleksandriya-2 became the first own reserve team that debuted at professional level in 2024.

== Current squad ==
As of 2 May 2025

Note: Flags indicate national team as defined under FIFA eligibility rules; some limited exceptions apply. Players may hold more than one non-FIFA nationality.

No.	Pos.	Nation	Player
2	DF	UKR	Illya Ukhan
3	DF	UKR	Yuriy Matviiv
13	GK	UKR	Yehor Taran
14	MF	UKR	Maksym Radchenko
16	FW	UKR	Nazar Kayda
25	MF	UKR	Illya Badenko
28	MF	UKR	Serhiy Lebedyev
32	DF	UKR	Daniil Romanenko
34	FW	UKR	Artem Petryk
35	DF	UKR	Danylo Harazha
39	DF	UKR	Dmytro Hrazhdan
42	MF	UKR	Yehor Tsevukh
49	MF	BRA	Mateus Amaral (on loan from São Paulo U20)

No.	Pos.	Nation	Player
52	FW	UKR	Oleksandr Zhadan
69	FW	UKR	Myron Hrebenyuk
72	GK	UKR	Nazar Makarenko
80	MF	UKR	Matviy Malko
83	MF	UKR	Danylo Khan
88	MF	UKR	Danylo Volynets
89	FW	UKR	Denys Kubenko
94	FW	UKR	Maksym Astafyev
96	MF	UKR	Vladyslav Shapovalov
97	MF	UKR	Nazar Prokopenko
98	MF	UKR	Denys Bredelyov
99	MF	UKR	Simon Haloyan

== Managers ==
- (Ukraine) Viktor Bytsyura (6 June 2024 – 2 October 2025)
- (Ukraine) Volodymyr Sharan (3 October 2025 – present)

== See also ==
- FC Oleksandriya
