= FC Dinaz Vyshhorod =

Ukrainian professional football club

- Full name: Vyshhorod Raion Sports Society FC Dinaz
- Founded: 1999
- Ground: Dinaz Stadium, Lyutizh
- Capacity: 1,000
- Chairman: Yaroslav Moskalenko
- Head coach: Oleksandr Holovko
- League: Ukrainian First League
- 2023–24: Ukrainian First League, 15th of 20
- Website: http://www.dinaz.com.ua/
Home colours	Away colours	Third colours

FC Dinaz Vyshhorod (Ukrainian: ФК «Діназ» Вишгород) is a Ukrainian professional club from Vyshhorod which plays in Ukrainian First League. Prior to entering professional football, the club was competing in the regional competitions of Kyiv Oblast and Ukrainian amateur competitions.

Its home stadium is located in the village of Lyutizh and has a capacity of 1,000 spectators. Its training stadium is located in Demydiv and holds up to 380 visitors.

== History ==
The club was founded in 1999 by Yaroslav Moskalenko.

== Honours ==
Ukrainian Second League

- Runners-up 2020–21

Football championship of Kyiv Oblast

- Winners (1): 2011
- Runners-up (2): 2015, 2018

Football cup of Kyiv Oblast

- Winners (3): 2005, 2012, 2015
- Runners-up (1): 2006

== Players ==
=== First team squad ===
As of 7 November 2026

Note: Flags indicate national team as defined under FIFA eligibility rules; some limited exceptions apply. Players may hold more than one non-FIFA nationality.

No.	Pos.	Nation	Player
1	GK	UKR	Ruslan Karnaushenko
3	DF	UKR	Denys Kuryakov
4	DF	UKR	Nikita Honcharov
5	DF	UKR	Andriy Hurin
7	MF	UKR	Andriy Soroka
8	FW	UKR	Danylo Kostyrya
9	MF	UKR	Nikita Dorosh
10	MF	UKR	Kyrylo Senko
11	MF	UKR	Denys Ostapchuk
13	GK	UKR	Ivan Bykhovchenko
14	MF	UKR	Daniil Savin
15	MF	UKR	Mykyta Boyev
17	DF	UKR	Oleksiy Zhurba
18	FW	UKR	Artur Bobita
19	MF	UKR	Oleksandr Smityukh

No.	Pos.	Nation	Player
20	GK	UKR	Denis Paliy
21	MF	UKR	Dmytro Ponomarenko
22	MF	UKR	Oleksandr Kantur
24	FW	UKR	Vladyslav Komunitskyi
25	MF	UKR	Mykhaylo Shust (captain)
27	MF	UKR	Yevhen Zeva
30	FW	UKR	Volodymyr Kononenko
44	FW	UKR	Vadym Penknyi
69	GK	UKR	Tit Chernetskyi
95	DF	UKR	Vladyslav Shulyak
96	DF	UKR	Oleksandr Zaytsev
99	DF	UKR	Daniil Zbrytskyi

=== Out on loan ===
Note: Flags indicate national team as defined under FIFA eligibility rules; some limited exceptions apply. Players may hold more than one non-FIFA nationality.

No. / Pos. / Nation / Player	No. / Pos. / Nation / Player

=== Personnel ===
Position	Staff
President	(Ukraine) Yaroslav Moskalenko
General director	(Ukraine) Serhiy Starenkyi
Head coach	(Ukraine) Oleksandr Holovko

== League and cup history ==
Season	Div.	Pos.	Pl.	W	D	L	GS	GA	P	Domestic Cup	Other		Notes
2000	4th (Amateur League "3")	5_{/5}	8	1	3	4	5	8	6	-	-	-	-
2001–2010	regional competitions (Kyiv Oblast)												
2011	4th (Amateur League "2")	6_{/6}	10	0	1	9	3	25	1	-	-	-	-
2012–2018	regional competitions (Kyiv Oblast)												
2018–19	4th (Amateur League "B")	5/12	22	10	5	7	47	38	35	-	-	-	Admission to Ukrainian Second League
2019–20	3th (Second League:Group A)	4/11	20	9	4	7	27	24	31	1/16 finals	-	-	-
2021–22	3th (Second League:Group A)	3/13	24	15	6	3	52	19	51	1/32 finals	-	-	-
2021–22	3th (Second League:Group A)	4/14	19	13	1	5	33	18	40	1/32 finals	-	-	Promotion to Ukrainian First League
2022–23	2nd (First League:Group A)	6 /8	14	2	4	8	14	28	10	-	-	-	Qualified to Relegation group
2022–23	2nd (First League:Group A)	12/16	14	5	6	3	16	17	21	-	-	-	-
2022–23	2nd (First League:Group B)	10 /10	18	3	4	11	15	28	13	1/64 finals	-	-	Qualified to Relegation group
2022–23	2nd (First League:Group B)	15/20	28	8	6	14	31	38	30	1/64 finals	-	-	-
2024–25	2nd (First League:Group B)	8 /9	16	3	4	9	12	28	13	1/64 finals	-	-	Qualified to Relegation group
2024–25	2nd (First League:Group B)	16/17	24	3	8	13	19	46	17	1/64 finals	-	-	Relegation to Ukrainian Second League
2025–26	3th (Second League:Group B)	9_{/11}	30	5	4	21	26	62	19	1/32 finals	-	-	-
2026–27	3th (Second League:Group A)	7_{/9}	3	0	2	1	7	11	2	1/32 finals	-	-	TBD

== Coaches ==
- 1999 – 1999 Valeriy Syvashenko
- 2001 – 2001 Volodymyr Kozhukhov
- 2003 – 2007 Volodymyr Ustynov
- 2007 – 2014 Oleh Spichek
  - 2013 – 2013 Oleksandr Yezhakov
- 2014 – 2016 Mykhailo Stelmakh
- 2016 – 2017 Ihor Prodan
- 2017 – 2017 Mykola Slobodianyuk
- 2018 – 2021 Volodymyr Bondarenko
- 2022 – present Oleksandr Holovko

== Notable players ==
- Yevhen Chepurnenko
- Maksym Banasevych
- Serhiy Starenkyi
