= Ihor Horbach =

Ukrainian water polo player

Personal information
- Nationality: Ukrainian
- Born: 11 August 1968 (age 56)

Sport
- Sport: Water polo

Ihor Horbach (born 11 August 1968) is a Ukrainian water polo player. He competed in the men's tournament at the 1996 Summer Olympics.
