= Vyacheslav Turchanov =

Ukrainian footballer

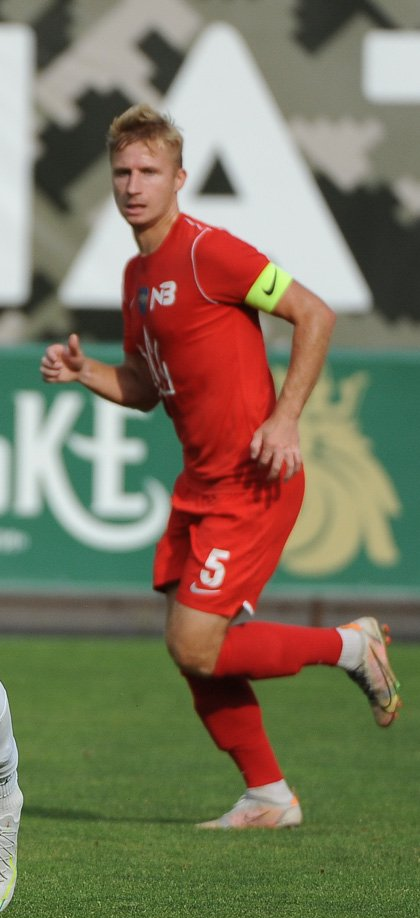

Personal information
- Full name: Vyacheslav Ihorovych Turchanov
- Date of birth: 3 August 1991 (age 35)
- Place of birth: Kyiv, Ukrainian SSR, Soviet Union
- Height: 1.80 m (5 ft 11 in)
- Position: Midfielder

Team information
- Current team: Kolos-2 Kovalivka
- Number: 8

Youth career
- 2004–2008: Arsenal Kyiv

Senior career*
| Years | Team | Apps | (Gls) |
| 2008–2010 | Dnipro Dnipropetrovsk | 0 | (0) |
| 2010–2013 | Obolon Kyiv | 12 | (0) |
| 2012 | → Obolon-2 Kyiv | 15 | (0) |
| 2013 | Arsenal Kyiv | 1 | (0) |
| 2013–2014 | Poltava | 37 | (0) |
| 2016–2017 | Arsenal Kyiv | 38 | (0) |
| 2017–2018 | Obolon-Brovar Kyiv | 30 | (0) |
| 2018 | Rubikon-Vyshneve (amateurs) | ? | (?) |
| 2019–2021 | Chaika Petropavlivska Borshchahivka | 36 | (1) |
| 2021–2024 | Nyva Buzova | 31 | (10) |
| 2024– | Kolos-2 Kovalivka | 13 | (1) |

International career^{‡}
| 2006–2007 | Ukraine-16 | 7 | (1) |
| 2006–2007 | Ukraine-17 | 14 | (2) |
| 2008 | Ukraine-18 | 1 | (0) |
| 2010 | Ukraine-20 | 2 | (0) |
| 2012 | Ukraine-21 | 2 | (0) |
- * Club domestic league appearances and goals as of 26 September 2023 ‡ National team caps and goals as of 7 June 2018

Vyacheslav Turchanov (Ukrainian: В`ячеслав Ігорович Турчанов; born 3 August 1991 in Kyiv) is a professional Ukrainian football midfielder who plays for Kolos-2 Kovalivka.

Turchanov is a product of the youth team systems of FC Arsenal Kyiv. He did not play in the first Arsenal's team and signed a contract with FC Obolon in 2009.

He was called up to play for the Ukraine national under-21 football team by trainer Pavlo Yakovenko for the Commonwealth Cup in 2012.
