= Andriy Bohdanov =

Ukrainian footballer (born 1990)

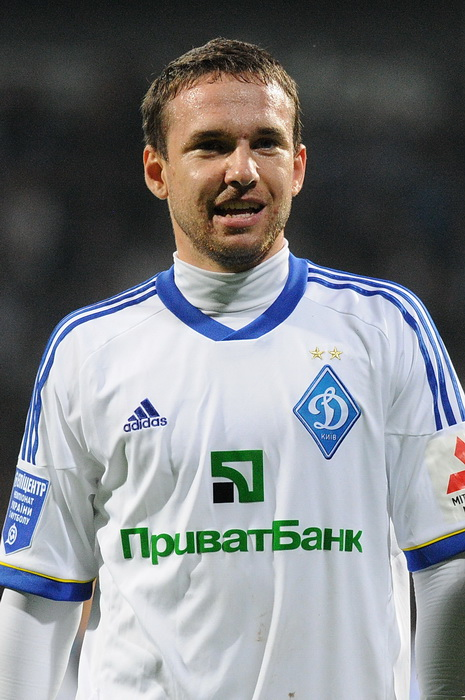
- Bohdanov with Dynamo Kyiv in 2012

Personal information
- Full name: Andriy Yevhenovych Bohdanov
- Date of birth: 21 January 1990 (age 36)
- Place of birth: Kyiv, Soviet Union (now Ukraine)
- Height: 1.80 m (5 ft 11 in)
- Position: Midfielder

Team information
- Current team: Trostianets
- Number: 90

Youth career
- 2003–2007: Dynamo Kyiv

Senior career*
Years	Team	Apps	(Gls)
2007–2008	Dynamo Kyiv	0	(0)
2007	→ Dynamo-3 Kyiv	14	(0)
2008–2012	Arsenal Kyiv	65	(5)
2009	→ Oleksandriya (loan)	14	(2)
2012–2013	Dynamo Kyiv	7	(0)
2013	→ Arsenal Kyiv (loan)	18	(3)
2014–2015	Metalist Kharkiv	9	(0)
2014–2015	→ Ergotelis (loan)	13	(1)
2015	Saxan	0	(0)
2015–2016	Volyn Lutsk	17	(0)
2016–2017	Olimpik Donetsk	40	(6)
2018	Arka Gdynia	21	(1)
2019	Desna Chernihiv	24	(1)
2020–2024	Kolos Kovalivka	84	(0)
2024–2026	Feniks-Mariupol	36	(4)
2026–	Trostianets	8	(2)

International career
2010	Ukraine U20	3	(2)
2010–2012	Ukraine U21	24	(3)
2013	Ukraine	1	(0)
- * Club domestic league appearances and goals as of 16 November 2026

Andriy Yevhenovych Bohdanov (Ukrainian: Андрій Євгенович Богданов; born 21 January 1990) is a Ukrainian professional footballer who plays as a midfielder for Trostianets.

== Club career ==
On 2 August 2024, Bohdanov signed with Feniks-Mariupol in the Ukrainian First League.

In July 2026, he signed for Trostianets

== Personal life ==
During the 2022 Russian invasion of Ukraine Bohdanov joined the Territorial Defense Forces of his hometown Kyiv.

== Honours ==
Arka Gdynia

- Polish Super Cup: 2018
