= FC Trostianets =

Trostianets
- Full name: Football Club Trostianets
- Founded: 2015
- Ground: Stadion imeni Kutsa, Trostianets
- Capacity: 1,100
- President: Bohdan Yesyp
- Head coach: Valeriy Shapovalov
- League: Ukrainian Second League
- 2025–26: Ukrainian Second League, 6th (Group B)
- Website: https://www.fctrostyanets.com/
Home colours	Away colours	Third colours

Football Club Trostianets (Ukrainian: Футбольний клуб «Тростянець») is a Ukrainian football club from Trostianets. In 2018–2019 the club merged with the disbanded FC Naftovyk Okhtyrka (later reinstated). In June 2021, FC Trostianets was admitted to the Second League.

== History ==
In 2015 the club was reestablished as part of public organization "Sport Trostianechyny" (Ukrainian: Спорт Тростянеччини) created in 2015. The idea of creation belongs to the mayor of Trostianets Yuriy Bova. As sponsors for the newly established club, there were Trostianets city council and a local chocolate factory owned by the American brand Mondelez International. During its debut season at the 2015 Sumy Oblast championship second tier the club placed second yielding to Lokomotyv Konotop. Later same year it also competed at an off-season tournament the Sumy Oblast winter championship where it placed 4th among 7 teams.

Before start the 2016 season FC Trostianets played an invitational friendly with a team from the Trostianets twin city Boguchwała tying at 1. For the 2016 season the club fielded two teams one in regional competitions of Sumy Oblast (second tier), another in Okhtyrka Raion. That season Trostianets first team placed 3rd, while second team placed 6th. The 2017 season was even less successful for the club and its first team placed only 4th. Later that year Trostianets also hosted a veteran team "Legends of Ukrainian Football" composed of many retired Ukrainian professional footballer among which were Oleg Salenko, Andriy Vorobey, Svyatoslav Syrota, Anatoliy Bezsmertnyi and many more. In 2017 there was initiated reconstruction of the city stadium during which was repaired the administration building, changing rooms, showering rooms, rooms for referees, fence-line at entrance.

In 2018 there took many changes among which was formation of the Trostianets united territorial community (hromada) and city, establishment of SC Akademiya futbolu at the stadium directed by Bohdan Yesyp, dissolution of FC Naftovyk Okhtyrka and its reserve Naftovyk-2. Because of all those events, it was decided to replace discontinued Naftovyk-2 in the Sumy Oblast top tier with FC Trostianets for the 2018 season. At the same time the club kept its reserve team at the Okhtyrka Raion championship (Trostianets-3) and another at the Sumy Oblast second tier (Trostianets-2). The 2018 season FC Trostianets finished 4th at the Sumy Oblast top tier. The same year, the club also reached the Sumy Oblast cup competition final yielding to LS Group (later FC Sumy). Trostianets-2 placed 5th at the Sumy Oblast second tier and it reached the cup competition semifinals being eliminated by the Trostianets first team.

In 2019 both Trostianets (on the rights of the folded Naftovyk Okhtyrka) and Trostianets-2 competed at the Sumy Oblast top tier with Trostianets-2 placing 2nd, while the first team only 4th. Trostianets-2 also won the Sumy Oblast cup and entered the 2019–20 Ukrainian Football Amateur League which in 2020 it finished on the 4th position in Group 2. Competing at the national amateur competition, in 2020 Trostianets-2 changed its name to Trostianets.

In 2020 Trostianets also became a champion of the Sumy Oblast beating in the gold match the revived FC Naftovyk Okhtyrka.

== League and cup history ==
Season	Div.	Pos.	Pl.	W	D	L	GS	GA	P	Domestic Cup	Europe		Notes
2021–22	3th (Second League:Group B)	7_{/16}	19	9	4	6	34	29	31	First preliminary round (1/128)	-	-	Withdrew after season
2023–24	3th (Second League)	11_{/14}	26	5	6	15	23	37	21	Third preliminary round (1/32)	-	-	-
2024–25	3th (Second League:Group B)	6_{/10}	18	5	7	6	20	16	22	First preliminary round (1/64)	-	-	-
2025–26	3th (Second League:Group B)	6_{/11}	30	13	8	9	46	31	47	Round of 64 (1/32)	-	-	-
2026–27	3th (Second League:Group B)	3_{/9}	12	4	5	3	14	9	17	Round of 32 (1/16)	-	-	TBD

== Honours ==
- Sumy Oblast Championship
  - Winner (1): 2020
  - Runners-up (1): 2019
- Sumy Oblast Cup
  - Winner (2): 2019, 2020
  - Runners-up (1): 2018

== Current squad ==
As of 23 February 2026

Note: Flags indicate national team as defined under FIFA eligibility rules; some limited exceptions apply. Players may hold more than one non-FIFA nationality.

No.	Pos.	Nation	Player
1	GK	UKR	Ivan Dubovyi
2	DF	UKR	Yuriy Myzyuk
7	MF	UKR	Maksym Chehlov
8	MF	UKR	Timofiy Khussin
9	MF	UKR	Andriy Slipukhin
11	MF	UKR	Heorhiy Kovalskyi
14	MF	UKR	Nazar Velychko
15	FW	UKR	Artem Novopashyn
17	MF	UKR	Vadym Taranushych (captain)
18	DF	UKR	Vadym Hordiychuk
21	MF	UKR	Pavlo Zamurenko

No.	Pos.	Nation	Player
23	MF	UKR	Serhiy Miserzhy
28	MF	UKR	Volodymyr Blyznyuk
29	GK	UKR	Bohdan Vasetskyi
31	GK	UKR	Serhiy Shapoval
33	FW	UKR	Yevheniy Mazur
36	DF	UKR	Vitaliy Morokhovets
43	FW	UKR	Vladyslav Vasylchenko
53	DF	UKR	Dmytro Kostyuchenko
55	MF	UKR	Volodymyr Korol
94	MF	UKR	Oleksandr Bolotenko
99	DF	UKR	Maksym Kovalenko

== Head coaches ==
- –2023 Serhiy Korytnyk
- 2023–2024 Valeriy Shapovalov
- 2024– Volodymyr Prokopynenko

== See also ==
- FC Naftovyk Okhtyrka
