= Kuts Stadium =

Stadium in Trostianets, Ukraine

- Стадіон імені Володимира Куца
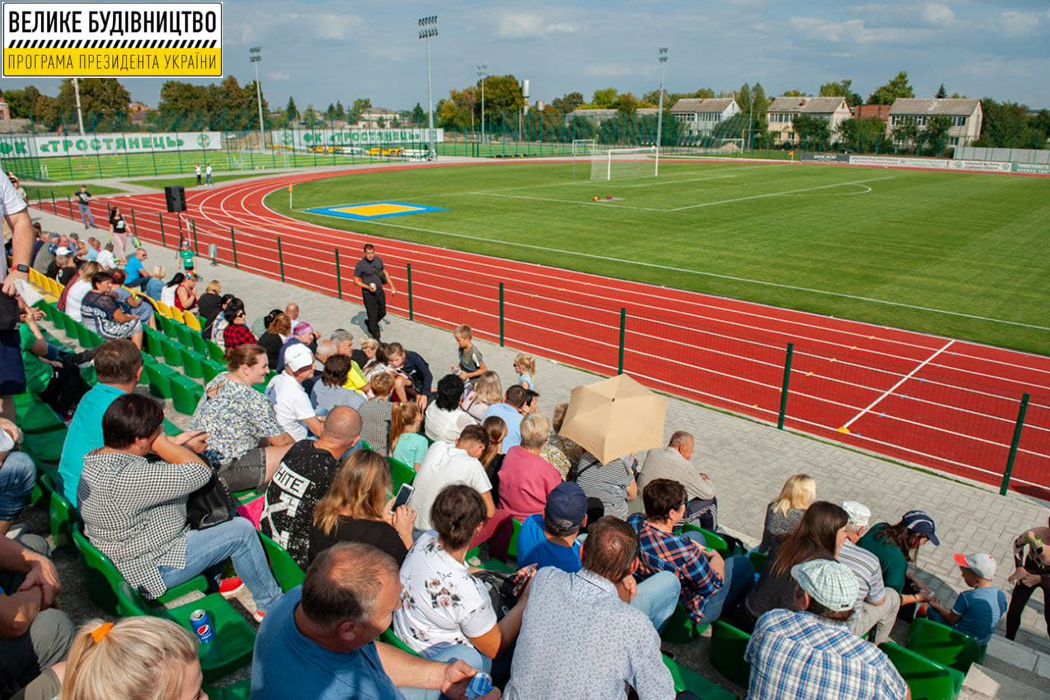
- Interactive map of Kuts Stadium
- Full name: Stadion imeni Volodymyra Kutsa
- Location: Keniha Street, 11 Trostianets, Ukraine
- Coordinates: 50°28′52″N 34°56′38″E
- Capacity: 1,124
- Surface: grass
- Field size: 105 m × 68 m (344 ft × 223 ft)

Construction
- Renovated: 2021

Tenant
- Trostianets

Stadion imeni Volodymyra Kutsa (Ukrainian: Стадіон імені Володимира Куца) is a football stadium in Trostianets, Ukraine. It is the home stadium of FC Trostianets.

It is a Ukrainian Association of Football Category 1 stadium. Stadium is named for Olympic champion Volodymyr Kuts. A monument dedicated to him was erected at the stadium in 1985.

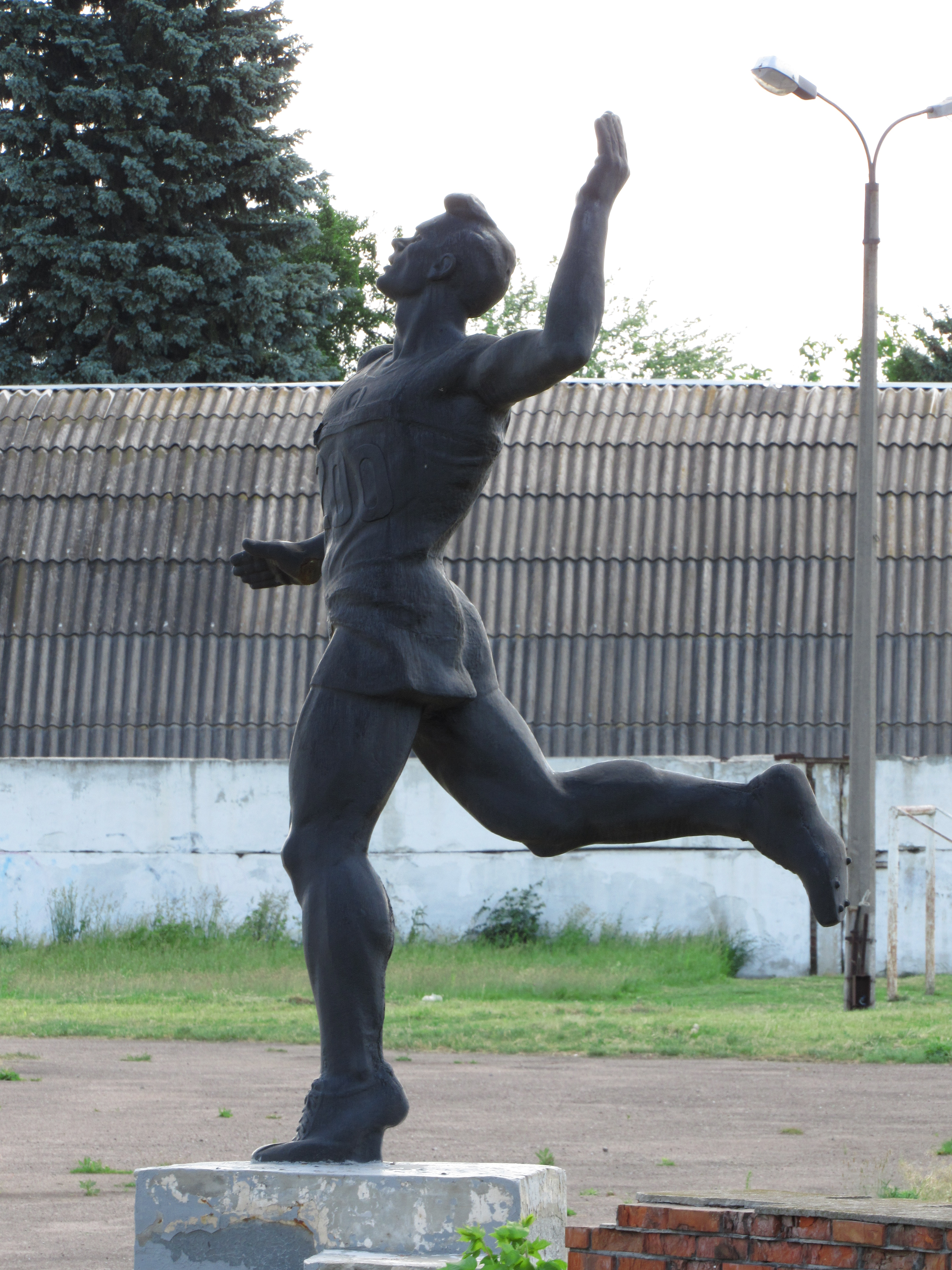
Monument to Volodymyr Kuts
