= CFC Penuel Kryvyi Rih =

Ukrainian football club

Penuel Kryvyi Rih
- Full name: Christian Football Club Penuel Kryvyi Rih
- Founded: 2005
- Ground: Svitlo, Kryvyi Rih
- Capacity: 500
- Chairman: Yuliy Morozov
- Manager: Oleksandr Zelenskyi

The Christian Football Club Penuel Kryvyi Rih (Ukrainian: Християнський футбольний клуб «Пенуел» Кривий Ріг) is a Ukrainian professional football club from the city of Kryvyi Rih. It is named after Penuel, a place described in the Hebrew Bible as being not far from Succoth, on the east of the Jordan River and south of the river Jabbok in present-day Jordan, mentioned in the Book of Genesis as the site of Jacob's struggle with the angel.

The club was formed back in 2005.

== History ==
Established in 2005 at the cultural and public center "Shelter+", the club itself is not part of any religious institution or denomination. It builds cooperation with all those for whom football, Christian values, and the development of a healthy young generation are important. Penuel fields several youth and children teams in the Ukrainian Youth Football League. The club has rebuilt the old stadium of the local mine Hvardiiska that the club bought from the State Property Fund of Ukraine.

In 2024, in an interview with "Ukrainskyi futbol", the president of CFC Penuel Yuliy Morozov explained that the club was created on the initiative of Andriy Trypolskyi, who at the age of 21 received an injury and was forced to give up his professional football career. About five years later, his team was adopted by the charity fund Shelter+.

In 2018–2022, Penuel participated every year in the league competitions of the Dnipropetrovsk Oblast, "Super League". In 2021–22, the club was quite successful at the Ukrainian First League U-19 Championship, which was interrupted due to the Russian invasion of Ukraine.

Since 2022, Penuel has participated in competitions of AAFU (amateur association). Despite placing close to the bottom of its group, the club was admitted to the 2025–26 Ukrainian Second League.

== League and cup history ==
Season	Div.	Pos.	Pl.	W	D	L	GS	GA	P	Domestic Cup	Europe		Notes
2023–24	4th (Amateur League)	9_{/9}	16	2	0	14	7	45	6	-	-	-	-
2024–25	4th (Amateur League:Group 2)	8_{/10}	18	5	3	10	24	34	18	-	-	-	Admission to Ukrainian Second League
2025–26	3th (Second League:Group B)	10_{/11}	30	3	8	19	27	64	17	Round of 64 (1/32)	-	-	-
2026–27	3th (Second League:Group B)	9_{/9}	12	3	2	7	10	26	11	Round of 64 (1/32)	-	-	TBD
