= 2026–27 FC Bratslav Vinnytsia season =

Bratslav Vinnytsia
2026–27 season
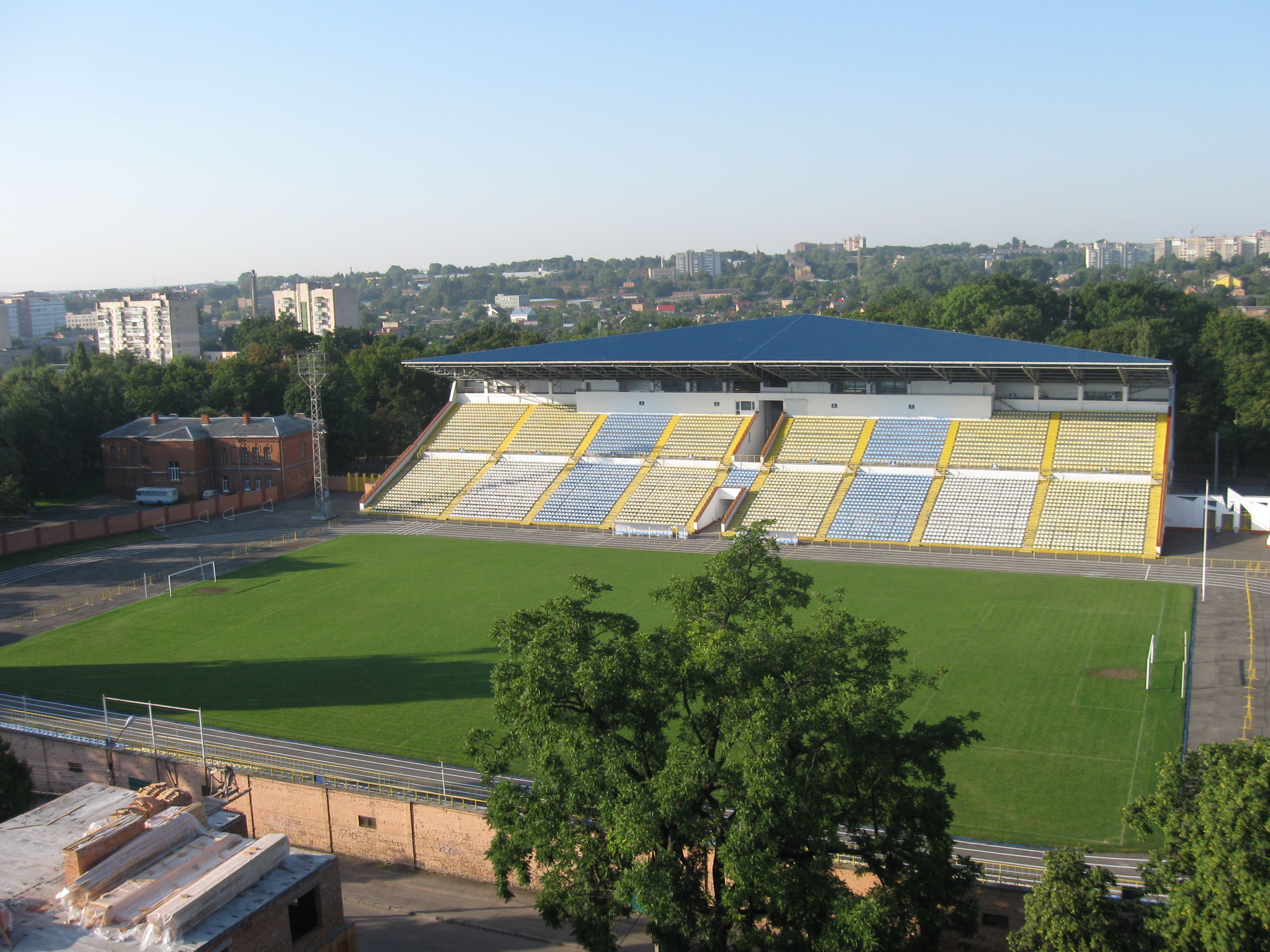
- Director: Yuriy Maksymenko
- Manager: Yuriy Hura
- Stadium: Sport Complex Podillia, Podillia; Nyva training base
- Second League: 1st
- Ukrainian Cup: Round of 64 (1/32)
- Top goalscorer: League: Ruslan Palamar (6) All: Ruslan Palamar (6)
- Highest home attendance: 480 (vs Podillya Khmelnytskyi, 10 October 2026)
- Lowest home attendance: 0 (vs Podillya, 1 August 2026)
- Biggest win: Bratslav Vinnytsia 4-0 Sambir-Nyva-2 Ternopil
- Biggest defeat: Nyva Vinnytsia 2-1 Bratslav Vinnytsia

During the 2026–27 season, FC Bratslav Vinnytsia competed in the Ukrainian Second League and in Ukrainian Cup for the first time.

== Season summary ==
On 4 July 2026, Vladyslav Nekhtiy signed a contract with the club. On 14 July 14, 2026, the club was officially included on the list of teams participating in the Ukrainian Second League, Group A, for the 2026-27 season. On 24 July 2026, Maksym Lopyryonok left the club signing with Probiy Horodenka in Ukrainian First League On 1 August 2026, the club played their first game at professional level facing Podillya Khmelnytskyi at Kolos Stadium in Stavyshche, Kyiv Oblast. They won the game 3:2 by scoring two goals in the final minutes. The first goal for Bratslav scored Pavlo Fedosov. On August 14, 2026, they secured their biggest victory, a 4–0 win against Sambir-Nyva-2 Ternopil at Kolos Stadium in Stavyshche. On 21 August 2026 lost in Round of 64 in Ukrainian Cup against Oleksandriya 0-2 at the Vasyl Faida Stadium in Lviv. Forward Oleksandr Kurakin has signed a contract with Hatoko Khanh Hoa a team competing in the V.2 League, the second tier of Vietnamese football running until the summer of 2027. In Ukrainian Second League, the club has gone eleven consecutive matches without a defeat, remaining in the lead of Group A throughout. On 2 November, the club lost its first match of the season to Nyva Vinnytsia 2–1, following an own goal; the match had originally begun the previous day but was interrupted due to a prolonged air-raid siren. On 15 November, 2026, the match against Dinaz Vyshhorod was postponed during the second half due to a prolonged air-raid alert. The match was completed the following day and ended in a 1–1 draw.

== Players ==
=== Squad information ===
As of 16 November 2026

Squad no.	Name	Nationality	Position	Date of birth (age)
Goalkeepers
1	Valeriy Voskonyan	(Armenia) (Ukraine)	GK	6 April 1994 (aged 32)
31	Dmytro Yashchenko	(Ukraine)	GK	19 August 2004 (aged 21)
71	Ilya Moskovchenko	(Ukraine)	GK	10 April 2007 (aged 19)
Defenders
17	Vladyslav Shkolnyi	(Ukraine)	DF	14 March 2002 (aged 24)
20	Mykola Yarosh	(Ukraine)	DF	22 May 2001 (aged 25)
21	Nikita Baginskyi	(Ukraine)	DF	22 February 2006 (aged 20)
23	Oleksandr Nasonov	(Ukraine)	DF	28 April 1992 (aged 34)
35	Andriy Bogoslavskyi	(Ukraine)	DF	22 December 1998 (aged 27)
66	Maksym Strads	(Ukraine)	DF	19 July 2002 (aged 24)
99	Volodymyr Shvets	(Ukraine)	MF	27 April 2004 (aged 22)
Midfielders
4	Valentyn Koreshkov	(Ukraine)	MF	17 February 1999 (aged 27)
5	Oleksandr Pyatov	(Ukraine)	MF	28 July 1996 (aged 29)
6	Danylo Hrabovetskyi	(Ukraine)	MF	5 March 2005 (aged 21)
8	Orest Panchyshyn	(Ukraine)	MF	10 August 2000 (aged 25)
10	Vadym Panasyuk	(Ukraine)	MF	10 August 2000 (aged 25)
19	Vladyslav Komunitskyi	(Ukraine)	MF	19 January 2004 (aged 22)
22	Ruslan Palamar	(Ukraine)	MF	9 August 1993 (aged 32)
29	Vladyslav Solovey	(Ukraine)	MF	10 March 2002 (aged 24)
30	Michael Obamina	(Nigeria)	MF	11 March 2003 (aged 23)
33	Vladyslav Nekhtiy	(Kazakhstan) (Ukraine)	MF	19 December 1991 (aged 34)
77	Oleksiy Bandurin	(Ukraine)	MF	25 March 2005 (aged 21)
85	Taras Shtokal	(Ukraine)	MF	29 January 2006 (aged 20)
Forwards
7	Pavlo Fedosov	(Ukraine)	FW	14 August 1996 (aged 29)
9	Valentyn Ovcharuk	(Ukraine)	FW	1 February 2003 (aged 23)
13	Yuriy Maksymenko	(Ukraine)	FW	19 December 1981 (aged 44)
	Dmytro Makarov	(Ukraine)	FW	19 March 2005 (aged 21)

== Transfers ==
=== In ===
Date	Pos.	Player	Age	Moving from	Type	Fee	Source
Summer
17 July 2026	FW	(Ukraine) Pavlo Fedosov	30	(Ukraine) Viktoriya Sumy	Transfer	Free	
17 July 2026	MF	(Ukraine) Vladyslav Nekhtiy	34	(Ukraine) Metalurh Zaporizhzhia	Transfer	Free	
17 July 2026	MF	(Ukraine) Oleksiy Bandurin	28	(Ukraine) Metalurh Zaporizhzhia	Transfer	Free	
19 July 2026	MF	(Ukraine) Maksym Strads	24	(Ukraine) FC Bucha Fortuna	Transfer	Free	
22 July 2026	GK	(Ukraine) Ilya Moskovchenko	19	(Ukraine) LNZ Cherkasy U19	Transfer	Free	
31 July 2026	MF	(Ukraine) Nikita Baginskyi	20	(Ukraine) Horishni Plavni	Transfer	Free	
31 July 2026	FW	(Ukraine) Valentyn Ovcharuk	23	(Ukraine) SC Chaika	Transfer	Free	
31 July 2026	MF	(Ukraine) Volodymyr Shvets	22	(Ukraine) Livyi Bereh Kyiv	Transfer	Free	
31 July 2026	MF	(Nigeria) Michael Obamina	23	(Ukraine) Naftovyk Dolyna	Transfer	Free	
7 August 2026	MF	(Ukraine) Taras Shtokal	20	(Ukraine) LNZ Cherkasy U19	Transfer	Free	
15 August 2026	GK	(Armenia) Valeriy Voskonyan	32	(Ukraine) Poltava	Transfer	Free	
15 August 2026	FW	(Ukraine) Dmytro Makarov	21	(Ukraine) Sambir-Nyva-2 Ternopil	Transfer	Free	
27 August 2026	MF	(Ukraine) Oleksandr Pyatov	30	(Ukraine) Poltava	Transfer	Free	
4 September 2026	MF	(Ukraine) Maksym Kulish	27	(Ukraine) Probiy Horodenka	Transfer	Free	
9 September 2026	MF	(Ukraine) Vladyslav Komunitskyi	22	(Ukraine) Dinaz Vyshhorod	Transfer	Free	

=== Out ===
Date	Pos.	Player	Age	Moving to	Type	Fee	Source
Summer
1 July 2026	GK	(Ukraine) Vitaliy Chebotaryov	33	Unattached	Released	Free	
1 July 2026	MF	(Ukraine) Maksym Astafyev	21	Unattached	Released	Free	
1 July 2026	FW	(Ukraine) Oleksandr Kurakin	20	Unattached	Released	Free	
22 July 2026	MF	(Ukraine) Kyrylo Matveev	24	(Ukraine) Probiy Horodenka	Transfer	Free	
24 July 2026	MF	(Ukraine) Maksym Lopyryonok	31	(Ukraine) Probiy Horodenka	Transfer	Free	
24 July 2026	FW	(Ukraine) Vasyl Palahnyuk	35	(Ukraine) Dnister Zalishchyky	Transfer	Free	
9 September 2026	FW	(Ukraine) Dmytro Makarov	21	Unattached	Released	Free	
23 September 2026	FW	(Ukraine) Oleksandr Kurakin	20	(Vietnam) Khatoco Khanh Hoa	Transfer	Free	

== Competitions ==
=== Overall record ===
Competition	First match	Last match	Starting round	Record							
Competition	First match	Last match	Starting round	Pld	W	D	L	GF	GA	GD	Win %
First League	25 July 2026	2027	Matchday 1	14	8	5	1	31	13	+18	57.14
Ukrainian Cup	21 August 2026	21 August 2026	Round of 32	1	0	0	1	0	2	−2	0.00
Total				15	8	5	2	31	15	+16	53.33

Last updated: 21 November 2026
Source: Results

=== First League ===
==== League table ====
Pos	Team	Pld	W	D	L	GF	GA	GD	Pts	Promotion, qualification or relegation
1	Bratslav Vinnytsia	14	8	5	1	31	13	+18	29	Qualification to the league's title play-off
2	Nyva Vinnytsia	14	7	5	2	26	17	+9	26	Qualification to the third place play-off
3	Podillya Khmelnytskyi	14	8	1	5	26	23	+3	25	
4	Dnister Zalishchyky	15	7	3	5	26	23	+3	24	
5	Sambir-Nyva-2 Ternopil	14	6	3	5	20	20	0	21	
6	Vilkhivtsi	13	4	5	4	17	18	−1	17	
7	Skala 1911 Stryi	13	3	3	7	17	25	−8	12	
8	Rukh Lviv	14	2	3	9	19	25	−6	9 (Note: Ranked on head-to-head points: Rukh Lviv 4, Dinaz Vyshhorod 1)	
9	Dinaz Vyshhorod	15	1	6	8	19	37	−18	9	

Updated to match(es) played on unknown. Source: PFL.ua
Rules for classification: 1) Points; 2) Head-to-head points; 3) Head-to-head goal difference; 4) Head-to-head goals scored; 5) Goal difference in all games; 6) Goals scored in all games (Note: calculation by criteria indicated in rules 2, 3, 4 is conducted with consideration of all teams that have equal number of tournament points at the moment of calculation and not only among those which after preliminary criteria have appeared more successful).
Notes:

Pos	Team	Pld	W	D	L	GF	GA	GD	Pts	Promotion, qualification or relegation
1	Carbon Cherkasy	13	7	4	2	26	16	+10	25	Qualification to the league's title play-off
2	Atlet Kyiv	14	6	5	3	27	18	+9	23	Qualification to the third place play-off
3	Trostianets	15	6	5	4	23	15	+8	23	
4	Rebel Kyiv	13	6	3	4	24	17	+7	21	
5	Avanhard Lozova	14	5	3	6	13	15	−2	18 (Note: Ranked on head-to-head points: Avanhard Lozova 3,Metalurh Zaporizhia 0)	
6	Metalurh Zaporizhia	13	5	3	5	15	15	0	18	
7	Oleksandriya-2	15	4	4	7	14	16	−2	16	
8	Poltava-2	14	4	3	7	13	18	−5	15	
9	Penuel Kryvyi Rih	14	3	2	9	11	36	−25	11	

Updated to match(es) played on unknown. Source: PFL.ua
Rules for classification: 1) Points; 2) Head-to-head points; 3) Head-to-head goal difference; 4) Head-to-head goals scored; 5) Goal difference in all games; 6) Goals scored in all games (Note: calculation by criteria indicated in rules 2, 3, 4 is conducted with consideration of all teams that have equal number of tournament points at the moment of calculation and not only among those which after preliminary criteria have appeared more successful).
Notes:

Both groups' winners were expected to play each other for the season's title. Also, both these teams gained a direct promotion to the 2027–28 Ukrainian First League. At the same time, both groups' runners-up were expected to play among themselves for the season's third place and to play against the 13th- and 14th-placed teams in the Persha Liha (First League) for promotion.

Both matches, the league's final and third-place match, were played in a single-leg format and on a neutral field. A draw determined the hosting team for each match, which took place on May 15.

==== Results summary ====
Overall								Home						Away					
Pld	W	D	L	GF	GA	GD	Pts	W	D	L	GF	GA	GD	W	D	L	GF	GA	GD
14	7	5	2	31	8	+23	26	5	1	1	15	3	+12	2	4	1	16	5	+11

Last updated: 21 November 2026.
Source: Results

==== Results by round ====
Round	1	2	3	4	5	6	7	8	9	10	11	12	13	14
Ground	H	A	H	H	H	A	H	A	A	H	A	A	A	H
Result	W	W	W	D	W	D	W	W	W	D	D	L	D	W
Position	1	1	1	1	1	1	1	1	1	1	1	1	1	1

Updated to match(es) played on 21 November 2026. Source: Results
A = Away; H = Home; W = Win; D = Draw; L = Loss

==== Matches ====
1 August 2026 1	Bratslav Vinnytsia	3–2	Podillya Khmelnytskyi	Stavyshche
15:30 EEST (UTC+03:00)		Report		Stadium: Kolos; Attendance: 0

9 August 2026 2	Vilkhivtsi	0–2	Bratslav Vinnytsia	Vilkhivtsi
15:30 EEST (UTC+03:00)		Report		Stadium: Vilkhivtsi Arena; Attendance: 251

15 August 2026 3	Bratslav Vinnytsia	4–0	Sambir-Nyva-2 Ternopil	Stavyshche
15:30 EEST (UTC+03:00)		Report		Stadium: Kolos; Attendance: 0

29 August 2026 4	Bratslav Vinnytsia	0–0	Nyva Vinnytsia	Stavyshche
15:30 EEST (UTC+03:00)		Report		Stadium: Kolos; Attendance: 80

13 September 2026 5	Bratslav Vinnytsia	2–0	Dinaz Vyshhorod	Stavyshche
15:30 EEST (UTC+03:00)		Report		Stadium: Kolos; Attendance: 50

13 September 2026 6	Dnister Zalishchyky	3–3	Bratslav Vinnytsia	Zalishchyky
15:30 EEST (UTC+03:00)		Report		Stadium: Dnister; Attendance: 300

26 September 2026 7	Bratslav Vinnytsia	3–0	Skala 1911 Stryi	Stavyshche
15:30 EEST (UTC+03:00)		Report		Stadium: Kolos; Attendance: 100

4 October 2026 8	Rukh Lviv	2–3	Bratslav Vinnytsia	Lviv
15:30 EEST (UTC+03:00)		Report		Stadium: NTB Rukh; Attendance: 100

10 October 2026 9	Podillya Khmelnytskyi	1–5	Bratslav Vinnytsia	Podillya
15:30 EEST (UTC+03:00)		Report		Stadium: Podillya SC; Attendance: 480

18 October 2026 10	Bratslav Vinnytsia	0–0	Vilkhivtsi	Stavyshche
15:30 EEST (UTC+03:00)		Report		Stadium: Kolos; Attendance: 50

23 October 2026 11	Sambir-Nyva-2 Ternopil	1–1	Bratslav Vinnytsia	Sambir
15:30 EEST (UTC+03:00)		Report		Stadium: imeni Brovarskoho; Attendance: 250

1 November 2026 12	Nyva Vinnytsia	Postponed	Bratslav Vinnytsia	Vinnytsia
15:30 EEST (UTC+03:00)				Stadium: Nyva training base

2 November 2026 12	Nyva Vinnytsia	2–1	Bratslav Vinnytsia	Vinnytsia
15:30 EEST (UTC+03:00)		Report		Stadium: Nyva training base Attendance: 450

15 November 2026 13	Dinaz Vyshhorod	Postponed	Bratslav Vinnytsia	Demydiv
15:30 EEST (UTC+03:00)				Stadium: Dinaz Stadium

16 November 2026 13	Dinaz Vyshhorod	1–1	Bratslav Vinnytsia	Demydiv
15:30 EEST (UTC+03:00)		Report		Stadium: Dinaz Stadium

21 November 2026 14	Bratslav Vinnytsia	3–1	Dnister Zalishchyky	Stavyshche
15:30 EEST (UTC+03:00)		Report		Stadium: Kolos

=== Ukrainian Cup ===
21 August 2026 Round of 64 (1/32)	Bratslav Vinnytsia	0–2	Oleksandriya	Vasyl Faida (Lviv)
EEST (UTC+3)		Report		Stadium: Kolos

== Statistics ==
=== Appearances and goals ===
No.	Pos	Nat	Player	Total		Ukrainian Second League		Ukrainian Cup		Play-offs	
No.	Pos	Nat	Player	Apps	Goals	Apps	Goals	Apps	Goals	Apps	Goals
Goalkeepers
1	GK	(Armenia) ARM	Valeriy Voskonyan	14	0	13	0	1	0	0	0
31	GK	(Ukraine) UKR	Dmytro Yashchenko	1	0	1	0	0	0	0	0
71	GK	(Ukraine) UKR	Ilya Moskovchenko	0	0	0	0	0	0	0	0
Defenders
17	DF	(Ukraine) UKR	Vladyslav Shkolnyi	8	1	7	1	1	0	0	0
20	DF	(Ukraine) UKR	Mykola Yarosh	0	0	0	0	0	0	0	0
21	DF	(Ukraine) UKR	Nikita Baginskyi	3	0	3	0	0	0	0	0
23	DF	(Ukraine) UKR	Oleksandr Nasonov	14	2	13	2	1	0	0	0
35	DF	(Ukraine) UKR	Andriy Bogoslavskyi	6	0	5	0	1	0	0	0
66	DF	(Ukraine) UKR	Maksym Strads	15	0	14	0	1	0	0	0
99	DF	(Ukraine) UKR	Volodymyr Shvets	10	0	9	0	1	0	0	0
Midfielders
5	MF	(Ukraine) UKR	Oleksandr Pyatov	8	4	8	4	0	0	0	0
4	MF	(Ukraine) UKR	Valentyn Koreshkov	15	2	14	2	1	0	0	0
6	MF	(Ukraine) UKR	Danylo Hrabovetskyi	0	0	0	0	0	0	0	0
8	MF	(Ukraine) UKR	Orest Panchyshyn	14	0	13	0	1	0	0	0
10	MF	(Ukraine) UKR	Vadym Panasyuk	15	2	14	2	1	0	0	0
11	MF	(Ukraine) UKR	Maksym Kulish	10	2	10	2	0	0	0	0
22	MF	(Ukraine) UKR	Ruslan Palamar	15	6	14	6	1	0	0	0
24	MF	(Ukraine) UKR	Andriy Petryk	8	1	8	1	0	0	0	0
29	MF	(Ukraine) UKR	Vladyslav Solovey	0	0	0	0	0	0	0	0
30	MF	(Nigeria) NGR	Michael Obamina	10	1	9	1	1	0	0	0
33	MF	(Ukraine) UKR	Vladyslav Nekhtiy	13	2	12	2	1	0	0	0
35	MF	(Ukraine) UKR	Andriy Bogoslavskyi	14	1	13	1	1	0	0	0
77	MF	(Ukraine) UKR	Oleksiy Bandurin	13	0	12	0	1	0	0	0
85	MF	(Ukraine) UKR	Taras Shtokal	13	2	12	2	1	0	0	0
Forwards
7	FW	(Ukraine) UKR	Pavlo Fedosov	10	4	9	4	1	0	0	0
9	FW	(Ukraine) UKR	Valentyn Ovcharuk	9	1	8	1	1	0	0	0
13	FW	(Ukraine) UKR	Yuriy Maksymenko	0	0	0	0	0	0	0	0
19	FW	(Ukraine) UKR	Vladyslav Komunitskyi	0	0	0	0	0	0	0	0
Players transferred out during the season
	FW	(Ukraine) UKR	Dmytro Makarov	0	0	0	0	0	0	0	0

Source: Competitions

Last updated: 21 November 2026

=== Goalscorers ===
Rank	No.	Pos	Nat	Name	Second League	Cup	Play-offs	Total
1	22	MF	(Ukraine)	Ruslan Palamar	6	0	0	6
2	7	FW	(Ukraine)	Pavlo Fedosov	4	0	0	4
3	5	MF	(Ukraine)	Oleksandr Pyatov	4	0	0	4
4	11	MF	(Ukraine)	Maksym Kulish	3	0	0	3
5	23	DF	(Ukraine)	Oleksandr Nasonov	2	0	0	2
6	33	MF	(Ukraine)	Vladyslav Nekhtiy	2	0	0	2
7	10	MF	(Ukraine)	Vadym Panasyuk	2	0	0	2
8	17	DF	(Ukraine)	Vladyslav Shkolnyi	1	0	0	1
9	85	MF	(Ukraine)	Taras Shtokal	1	0	0	1
10	30	MF	(Nigeria)	Michael Obamina	1	0	0	1
11	4	MF	(Ukraine)	Valentyn Koreshkov	1	0	0	1
12	9	FW	(Ukraine)	Valentyn Ovcharuk	1	0	0	1
13	8	MF	(Ukraine)	Orest Panchyshyn	1	0	0	1
14	24	MF	(Ukraine)	Andriy Petryk	1	0	0	1
15	35	DF	(Ukraine)	Andriy Bogoslavskyi	1	0	0	1
				Total	32	0	0	32

Last updated: 21 November 2026

=== Clean sheets ===
Rank	No.	Pos	Nat	Name	First League	Cup	Play-offs	Total
1	1	GK	(Armenia)	Valeriy Voskonyan	6	0	0	6
				Total	6	0	0	6

Last updated: 18 October 2026

=== Disciplinary record ===
No.	Pos	Nat	Player	First League			Ukrainian Cup			Play-offs			Total		
No.	Pos	Nat	Player	Yellow card	(yellow card) (yellow-red card)	Red card	Yellow card	(yellow card) (yellow-red card)	Red card	Yellow card	(yellow card) (yellow-red card)	Red card	Yellow card	(yellow card) (yellow-red card)	Red card
8	MF	(Ukraine)	Orest Panchyshyn	4	0	0	0	0	0	0	0	0	4	0	0
35	DF	(Ukraine)	Andriy Bogoslavskyi	3	0	0	0	0	0	0	0	0	3	0	0
23	DF	(Ukraine)	Oleksandr Nasonov	3	0	0	0	0	0	0	0	0	3	0	0
66	DF	(Ukraine)	Maksym Strads	3	0	0	0	0	0	0	0	0	3	0	0
10	MF	(Ukraine)	Vadym Panasyuk	2	0	0	0	0	0	0	0	0	2	0	0
77	MF	(Ukraine)	Oleksiy Bandurin	1	0	0	1	0	0	0	0	0	2	0	0
4	MF	(Ukraine)	Valentyn Koreshkov	2	0	0	0	0	0	0	0	0	2	0	0
24	MF	(Ukraine)	Andriy Petryk	2	0	0	0	0	0	0	0	0	2	0	0
17	DF	(Ukraine)	Vladyslav Shkolnyi	1	0	0	0	0	0	0	0	0	1	0	0
33	MF	(Ukraine)	Vladyslav Nekhtiy	1	0	0	0	0	0	0	0	0	1	0	0
30	MF	(Ukraine)	Volodymyr Shvets	1	0	0	0	0	0	0	0	0	1	0	0
7	FW	(Ukraine)	Pavlo Fedosov	1	0	0	0	0	0	0	0	0	1	0	0
22	MF	(Ukraine)	Ruslan Palamar	0	0	0	1	0	0	0	0	0	1	0	0
			Total	21	0	0	2	0	0	0	0	0	23	0	0

Last updated: 21 November 2026
