= Boza (name) =

Boza is a surname. Notable people with the name include:

- Benjamín Boza (fl. 1900–1901), Peruvian politician, mayor of Lima
- Carlota Boza (born 2001), Spanish actress
- Francisco Boza (born 1964), Peruvian sports shooter
- Juan Boza (1941–1991), Cuban artist
- Máximo Arrates Boza (1859–1936), Panamanian composer
- Boza (born 1997), Panamanian singer

== See also ==
- Boza, fermented drink made from maize or wheat
- Bolsover, nicknamed 'Boza'
- Boža Jovanović (fl. 1979–1982), Serbian rock drummer
- Boża Wola (disambiguation)
- Bozas, French commune
- Bozza, surname
- Bosa (disambiguation)
- Buza (disambiguation)
