= Buza =

Buza can refer to:

== Places ==
- Buza, Iran
- Buza, Poland
- Buza, Cluj, a commune in Romania

== Other uses ==
- Bouza (beer), variant spelling of the Egyptian beverage
- Boza, a beverage
- Booza (also bouza), a Syrian ice-cream

== See also ==
- Boza (name)
