= FC Chernihiv Player of the Year =

Chernihiv
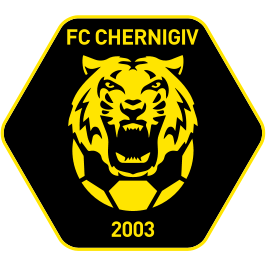
- Full name: Football Club Chernihiv
- Founded: December 7, 2003; 22 years ago
- Ground: Chernihiv Arena
- Capacity: 500
- Owner: Yuriy Synytsya
- Director: Mykola Synytsya
- Manager: Valeriy Chornyi
- Website: http://chernigiv.ua/

The FC Chernihiv Player of the Year award is voted for annually by the members of the official fan club for FC Chernihiv, in recognition of the best overall performance by an individual player throughout the football season.

== Winners ==
Season	Name	Age	Position	Nationality	Caps	Current club
2026	Maksym Tatarenko	27	Goalkeeper	Ukraine	48	FC Chernihiv
2025	Maksym Tatarenko	27	Goalkeeper	Ukraine	48	FC Chernihiv
2024	Pavlo Fedosov	29	Striker	Ukraine	43	Bratslav Vinnytsia
2023	Maksym Serdyuk	23	Midfielder	Ukraine	114	FC Chernihiv

== Wins by playing position ==
Position	Number of winners
Goalkeeper	2
Defender	0
Midfielder	1
Forward	1

== Wins by nationality ==
Nationality	Number of winners
Ukraine	4
