= Wierzbica-Osiedle =

- Village
- Location within Poland
- Coordinates: 51°15′43″N 23°18′30″E
- Country: Poland
- Voivodeship: Lublin
- County: Chełm
- Gmina: Wierzbica

Wierzbica-Osiedle [vjɛʐˈbit͡sa ɔˈɕɛdlɛ] is a village in the administrative district of Gmina Wierzbica, within Chełm County, Lublin Voivodeship, in eastern Poland.

== Sport ==
The village is represented by the football club Ogniwo Wierzbica who have generally competed in the Liga okręgowa, although the club was promoted to the IV liga during the 2023-2024 season.
