= Michael Obamina =

Nigerian footballer (born 2003)

Personal information
- Full name: Michael Obamina
- Date of birth: 11 April 2003 (age 23)
- Place of birth: Benin City, Nigeria
- Height: 1.73 m (5 ft 8 in)
- Position: Midfielder

Team information
- Current team: Bratslav Vinnytsia
- Number: 30

Youth career
- –2021: Super Stars Football Academy

Senior career*
Years	Team	Apps	(Gls)
2021–2024	Rukh Lviv	0	(0)
2021–2024	→ Rukh-2 Lviv	1	(0)
2024	Kremin Kremenchuk	10	(0)
2025–2026	Naftovyk Dolyna	0	(0)
2026–	Bratslav Vinnytsia	9	(1)
- * Club domestic league appearances and goals as of 4 October 2026

Michael Obamina (born 11 April 2003) is a Nigerian professional footballer who plays as a midfielder for Ukrainian club Bratslav Vinnytsia .

== Early life ==
Michael Obamina was born on 11 April 2003, in Benin City, Nigeria. He was trained in Super Stars Football Academy in Uyo, Nigeria. Ukrainian First League club Rukh Lviv tried to sign him in 2019, however COVID pandemic made the move impossible at that time.

== Club career ==
=== Rukh Lviv ===
Obamina joined Rukh in September 2021. He signed a four-year contract and took the number 41 shirt. After joining the club Obamina played for Rukh U17 and U19 teams. He made his debut in the fifty-eights minute for U19 team in a 3:1 win against Zorya Luhansk U19 on 10 September 2021. He played in three matches in that season. In the next season he played in three matches again, however this was enough for him to receive a medal when Rukh U19 won the league. He left the club as a free agent in February 2024.

=== Rukh-2 Lviv ===
Obamina played in one match in the 2021 Football Championship of Lviv Oblast with the second team of Rukh. In next season he played in nine and scored once. His goal was fortieth goal scored by a Rukh player in Lviv Oblast Premier League. He also became eight hundred and forty-fifth goal scorer in the league. In the 2023 season Obamina played in seven matches. He scored twice during the season.

Obamina made his debut for Rukh-2 in the Ukrainian Second League on 23 November 2023. He came on in the eighty-fourth minute in a 2:1 loss to Nyva Vinnytsia.

=== Kremin ===
In mid January Obamina was training with Ukrainian First League club Kremin Kremenchuk. He scored in a 3:3 draw with Rokyta in a Winter Cup on 10 February. Kremin announced that Obamina joined the team on 27 February. He signed a two-year contract and took the number 30 shirt. In June 2024 he went on trial to Podillya Khmelnytskyi where he scored in a friendly against Kolos Polonne on 19th.

== Career statistics ==
As of 13 June 2024

Appearances and goals by club, season and competition
Club	Season	League			Cup		Other		Total	
Club	Season	Division	Apps	Goals	Apps	Goals	Apps	Goals	Apps	Goals
Rukh Lviv U19	2021–22	Ukrainian Premier League Under-19	—		—		—		—	
Rukh Lviv U19	2022–23	Ukrainian Premier League Under-19	—		—		—		—	
Rukh Lviv U19	Total		—		—		—		—	
Rukh-2 Lviv	2021	Lviv Oblast Premier League	1	0	—		—		1	0
Rukh-2 Lviv	2022	Lviv Oblast Premier League	9	1	—		—		9	1
Rukh-2 Lviv	2023	Lviv Oblast Premier League	7	2	—		2	0	9	2
Rukh-2 Lviv	2023–24	Second League	1	0	—		—		1	0
Rukh-2 Lviv	Total		18	3	—		2	0	20	3
Kremin	2023–24	First League	10	0	—		—		10	0
Career total			28	3	—		2	0	30	3

== Honours ==
Rukh Lviv U19

- Ukrainian Premier League U19: 2022–23
