= Pniówno =

- Village
- Location within Poland
- Coordinates: 51°14′35″N 23°20′38″E
- Country: Poland
- Voivodeship: Lublin
- County: Chełm
- Gmina: Wierzbica

Pniówno [ˈpɲuvnɔ] is a village in the administrative district of Gmina Wierzbica, within Chełm County, Lublin Voivodeship, in eastern Poland.
