= Chylin Mały =

- Village
- Location within Poland
- Coordinates: 51°16′36″N 23°19′13″E
- Country: Poland
- Voivodeship: Lublin
- County: Chełm
- Gmina: Wierzbica

Chylin Mały [ˈxɨlin ˈmawɨ] is a village in the administrative district of Gmina Wierzbica, within Chełm County, Lublin Voivodeship, in eastern Poland.
