= Olchowiec-Kolonia, Chełm County =

Olchowiec-Kolonia
- Village
- Location within Poland
- Coordinates: 51°13′45″N 23°16′45″E
- Country: Poland
- Voivodeship: Lublin
- County: Chełm
- Gmina: Wierzbica

Olchowiec-Kolonia [ɔlˈxɔvjɛt͡s kɔˈlɔɲa] is a village in the administrative district of Gmina Wierzbica, within Chełm County, Lublin Voivodeship, in eastern Poland.
