= Karczunek, Chełm County =

Karczunek
- Village
- Location within Poland
- Coordinates: 51°20′39″N 23°17′59″E
- Country: Poland
- Voivodeship: Lublin
- County: Chełm
- Gmina: Wierzbica

Karczunek [karˈt͡ʂunɛk] is a village in the administrative district of Gmina Wierzbica, within Chełm County, Lublin Voivodeship, in eastern Poland.
