= Vitaliy Chebotaryov =

Ukrainian footballer

Personal information
- Full name: Vitalii Vitaliiovych Chebotarov
- Date of birth: 7 February 1996 (age 30)
- Place of birth: Ukraine
- Height: 1.79 m (5 ft 10 in)
- Position: Goalkeeper

Team information
- Current team: Bratslav

Youth career
- 2010–2013: Arsenal Kharkiv

Senior career*
Years	Team	Apps	(Gls)
2013	Helios Kharkiv	0	(0)
2015	Kvadro	10	(0)
2015	Tskhinvali	0	(0)
2016	Locomotive Tbilisi	0	(0)
2016–2017	Naftovyk Okhtyrka	0	(0)
2017–2018	Kakhovka	6	(0)
2018	Kvadro	12	(0)
2019	Trostianets	0	(0)
2019	Tavriya Simferopol	17	(0)
2020–2021	Metalist Kharkiv	0	(0)
2021–2022	Trostianets	1	(0)
2022	Bukovyna Chernivtsi	6	(0)
2023–2025	Livyi Bereh Kyiv	14	(0)
2025	UCSA Tarasivka	4	(0)
2025–2026	Obolon Kyiv	0	(0)
2026	Bratslav	0	(0)
- * Club domestic league appearances and goals as of 10 July 2026 ‡ National team caps and goals as of 21 September 2025

Vitalii Vitaliiovych Chebotarov (Ukrainian: Віталій Віталійович Чеботарьов; born 7 February 1996) is a Ukrainian professional footballer who plays as an Goalkeeper for Bratslav.

== Club career ==
He started playing football at the Arsenal Kharkiv academy. In 2015, he played 10 matches in the Kharkiv regional championship for Kvadro. In the same year, he went to Georgia, where he played for Tskhinvali and Locomotive Tbilisi.

In July 2016, he joined the club Naftovyk Okhtyrka. He was included in the team's squad for the matches of the Ukrainian First League, but he did not play a single match.

In 2020 he signed for Metalist Kharkiv in Ukrainian Second League. In June of the following year he left the club without playing a single match. In 2021 he moved to Trostianets where he played one match in Ukrainian Second League. On 4 August 2021 he made his debut in Ukrainian Cup against Skoruk Tomakivka.

In 2022 he signed for Bukovyna Chernivtsi but after 6 matches he was released by the club.

In March 2025, he moved to UCSA Tarasivka in the Ukrainian First League. In July 2025, his contract with the club was ended by mutual agreement.

In September 2025, he signed for Obolon Kyiv in the Ukrainian Premier League.

At the end of February 2026 he moved to Bratslav.

== Honours ==
Metalist Kharkiv

- Ukrainian Second Leagueː 2020–21
