= Kozia Góra, Lublin Voivodeship =

Kozia Góra
- Village
- Location within Poland
- Coordinates: 51°15′45″N 23°21′43″E
- Country: Poland
- Voivodeship: Lublin
- County: Chełm
- Gmina: Wierzbica

Kozia Góra [ˈkɔʑa ˈɡura] is a village in the administrative district of Gmina Wierzbica, within Chełm County, Lublin Voivodeship, in eastern Poland.
