= Bakus-Wanda =

- Village
- Location within Poland
- Coordinates: 51°17′46″N 23°16′17″E
- Country: Poland
- Voivodeship: Lublin
- County: Chełm
- Gmina: Wierzbica

Bakus-Wanda [ˈbakus ˈvanda] is a village in the administrative district of Gmina Wierzbica, within Chełm County, Lublin Voivodeship, in eastern Poland.
