= Busówno =

- Village
- Location within Poland
- Coordinates: 51°15′50″N 23°16′50″E
- Country: Poland
- Voivodeship: Lublin
- County: Chełm
- Gmina: Wierzbica
- Elevation: 200 m (660 ft)

Busówno [buˈsuvnɔ] is a village in the administrative district of Gmina Wierzbica, within Chełm County, Lublin Voivodeship, in eastern Poland.
