= Wólka Tarnowska, Lublin Voivodeship =

Wólka Tarnowska
- Village
- Location within Poland
- Coordinates: 51°18′N 23°17′E
- Country: Poland
- Voivodeship: Lublin
- County: Chełm
- Gmina: Wierzbica

Population
  - Total: 160

Wólka Tarnowska [ˈvulka tarˈnɔfska] is a village in the administrative district of Gmina Wierzbica, within Chełm County, Lublin Voivodeship, in eastern Poland.
