= Pavlo Fedosov =

Ukrainian footballer (born 1996)

Personal information
- Full name: Pavlo Ihorovych Fedosov
- Date of birth: 14 August 1996 (age 30)
- Place of birth: Chernihiv, Ukraine
- Height: 1.75 m (5 ft 9 in)
- Position: Striker

Team information
- Current team: Bratslav Vinnytsia
- Number: 7

Youth career
- 2013: Yunist Chernihiv

Senior career*
Years	Team	Apps	(Gls)
2013	YSB Chernihiv	7	(1)
2014–2015	Polissya Dobryanka	8	(4)
2015–2017	Arsenal-Bila Tserkva	39	(5)
2016	Riga	4	(0)
2017	→ Sumy (loan)	12	(0)
2017	→ Arsenal Kyiv (loan)	12	(2)
2017–2018	Arsenal Kyiv	14	(2)
2017–2019	Nyva Vinnytsia	26	(7)
2019–2020	Avanhard Koriukivka	3	(1)
2020–2022	Balkany Zorya	16	(4)
2023–2025	Chernihiv	35	(10)
2026	Viktoriya Sumy	7	(0)
2026–	Bratslav Vinnytsia	9	(4)
- * Club domestic league appearances and goals as of 21 November 2026

Pavlo Fedosov (Ukrainian: Павло Ігорович Федосов; born 14 August 1996) is a Ukrainian professional footballer who plays as a striker for Bratslav Vinnytsia.

== Career ==
Fedosov is a product of Yunist Chernihiv Youth Sportive School, joining at age 6.

=== Riga ===
In 2016 he moved to Riga in the Latvian First League but he did not find much space in the club and played only for matches.

=== Sumy ===
In 2016 he moved to Sumy in the Ukrainian First League.

=== Arsenal Kyiv ===
In August 2017 he signed a contract with club FC Arsenal Kyiv in the Ukrainian First League.

=== Nyva Vinnytsia ===
In 2018 he moved to Nyva Vinnytsia.

=== Balkany Zorya ===
In 2021 he moved to Balkany Zorya.

=== Chernihiv ===
On 29 March 2023 he signed a new contract with Chernihiv in the Ukrainian First League. On 19 november 2023, he was included in the Best XI of Round 17 of the 2023–24 Ukrainian First League. Following the promotion of the club in Ukrainian First League, he was not included in the roster of the club.

=== Viktoriya Sumy ===
On 18 March 2026 he signed for FC Viktoriya Sumy.

=== Bratslav Vinnytsia ===
In summer 2026, he signed for Bratslav Vinnytsia and on 1 August 2026 he scored his first goal against Podillya Khmelnytskyi at Kolos Stadium in Stavyshche, Kyiv Oblast. Following his performance he was included in the Best XI of Round 1 of the 2026–27 Ukrainian Second League.

== Personal life ==
His mother, Tetyana Fedosova, is a retired footballer who played for Lehenda Chernihiv.

== Career statistics ==
As of match played 21 November 2026

Appearances and goals by club, season and competition
Club	Season	League			Cup		Europe		Other		Total	
Club	Season	Division	Apps	Goals	Apps	Goals	Apps	Goals	Apps	Goals	Apps	Goals
Bila Tserkva	2014–15	Ukrainian Second League	25	2	0	0	0	0	0	0	25	2
Bila Tserkva	2015–16	Ukrainian Second League	14	3	0	0	0	0	0	0	14	3
Riga	2016	Latvian Higher League	4	0	0	0	0	0	0	0	4	0
Sumy (loan)	2016–17	Ukrainian First League	12	0	0	0	0	0	0	0	12	0
Arsenal Kyiv (loan)	2016–17	Ukrainian First League	11	2	0	0	0	0	0	0	11	2
Arsenal Kyiv	2017–18	Ukrainian First League	2	0	0	0	0	0	0	0	2	0
Nyva Vinnytsia	2017–18	Ukrainian Second League	10	1	0	0	0	0	0	0	10	1
Nyva Vinnytsia	2018–19	Ukrainian Second League	16	6	0	0	0	0	0	0	16	6
Avangard Korukivka	2019–20	Ukrainian Football Amateur League	3	1	0	0	0	0	0	0	3	1
Balkany Zorya	2020–21	Ukrainian Second League	8	2	0	0	0	0	0	0	8	2
Balkany Zorya	2021–22	Ukrainian Second League	8	2	0	0	0	0	0	0	8	2
Chernihiv	2022–23	Ukrainian First League	0	0	0	0	0	0	0	0	0	0
Chernihiv	2023–24	Ukrainian First League	28	9	1	0	0	0	0	0	29	9
Chernihiv	2024–25	Ukrainian Second League	7	1	1	1	0	0	0	0	8	2
Viktoriya Sumy	2025–26	Ukrainian First League	7	0	0	0	0	0	0	0	7	0
Bratslav Vinnytsia	2026–27	Ukrainian Second League	9	4	1	0	0	0	0	0	10	4
Career total			164	32	3	1	0	0	0	0	167	33

== Honours ==
Arsenal Kyiv

- Ukrainian First League: 2017–18

Riga

- Latvian Cup: Runner-Up 2016–17

Individual

- Top Scorer of Chernihiv on the season 2023–24 (9 goals)
- FC Chernihiv Player of the Year: (1) 2024
