= Święcica, Lublin Voivodeship =

Święcica
- Village
- Location within Poland
- Coordinates: 51°13′42″N 23°18′41″E
- Country: Poland
- Voivodeship: Lublin
- County: Chełm
- Gmina: Wierzbica

Święcica (Polish pronunciation: [ɕfjɛɲˈt͡ɕit͡sa]) is a village in the administrative district of Gmina Wierzbica, within Chełm County, Lublin Voivodeship, in eastern Poland.
