= Wierzbica, Gmina Wierzbica =

Wierzbica
- Village
- Location within Poland
- Coordinates: 51°15′44″N 23°19′13″E
- Country: Poland
- Voivodeship: Lublin
- County: Chełm
- Gmina: Wierzbica

Population
  - Total: 310
- Website: http://www.ugwierzbica.pl/

Wierzbica ([vjɛʐˈbit͡sa]) is a village in Chełm County, Lublin Voivodeship, in eastern Poland. It is the seat of the gmina (administrative district) called Gmina Wierzbica.
