= Kamienna Góra, Lublin Voivodeship =

Kamienna Góra
- Village
- Location within Poland
- Coordinates: 51°13′17″N 23°19′54″E
- Country: Poland
- Voivodeship: Lublin
- County: Chełm
- Gmina: Wierzbica

Kamienna Góra [kaˈmjɛnna ˈɡura] is a village in the administrative district of Gmina Wierzbica, within Chełm County, Lublin Voivodeship, in eastern Poland.
