= Chylin, Lublin Voivodeship =

Chylin
- Village
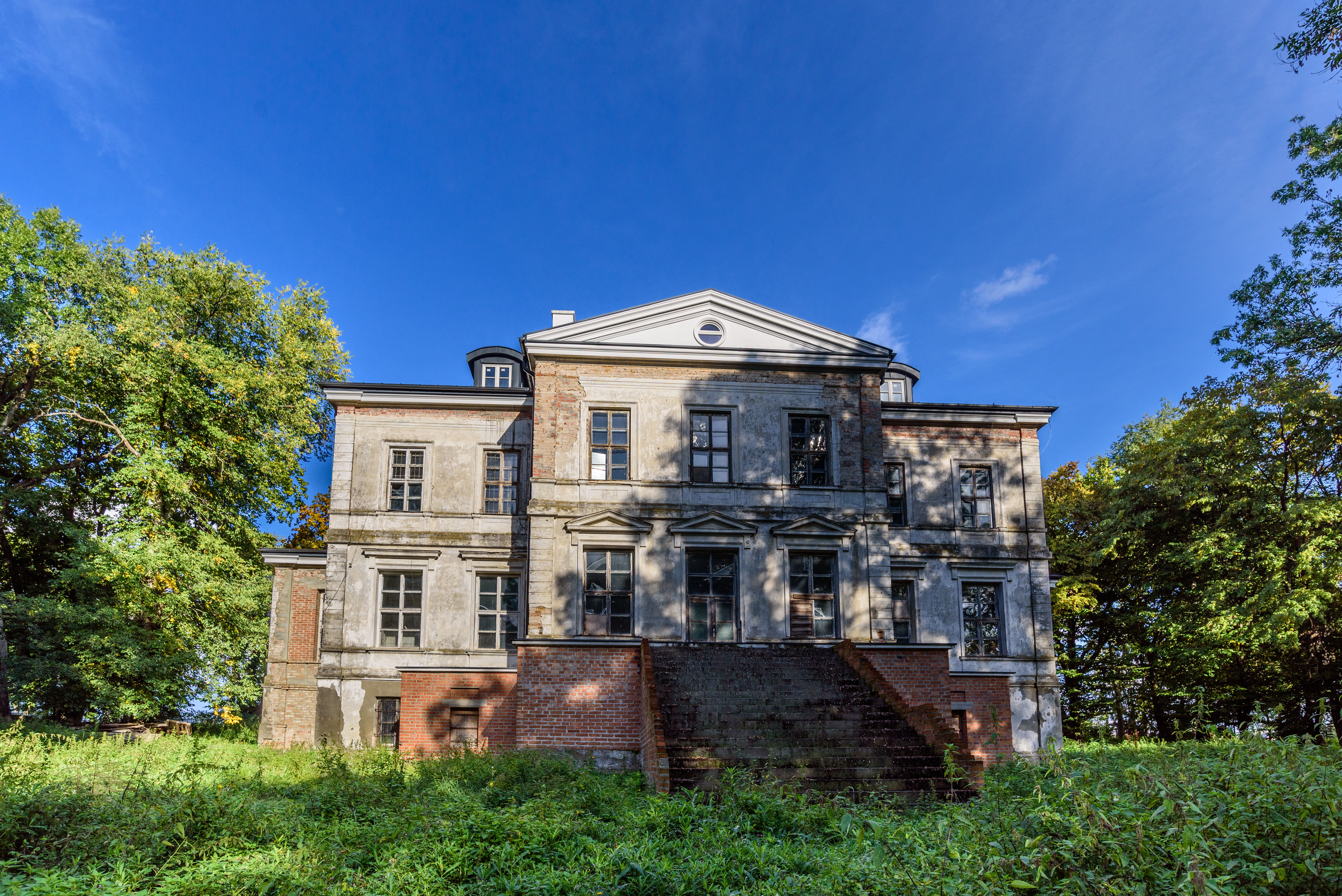
- Manor in Chylin (2022)

- Location within Poland
- Coordinates: 51°17′13″N 23°19′53″E
- Country: Poland
- Voivodeship: Lublin
- County: Chełm
- Gmina: Wierzbica

Chylin [ˈxɨlin] is a village in the administrative district of Gmina Wierzbica, within Chełm County, Lublin Voivodeship, in eastern Poland.
