= Gmina Wierzbica, Lublin Voivodeship =

Gmina Wierzbica Wierzbica Commune
- Gmina
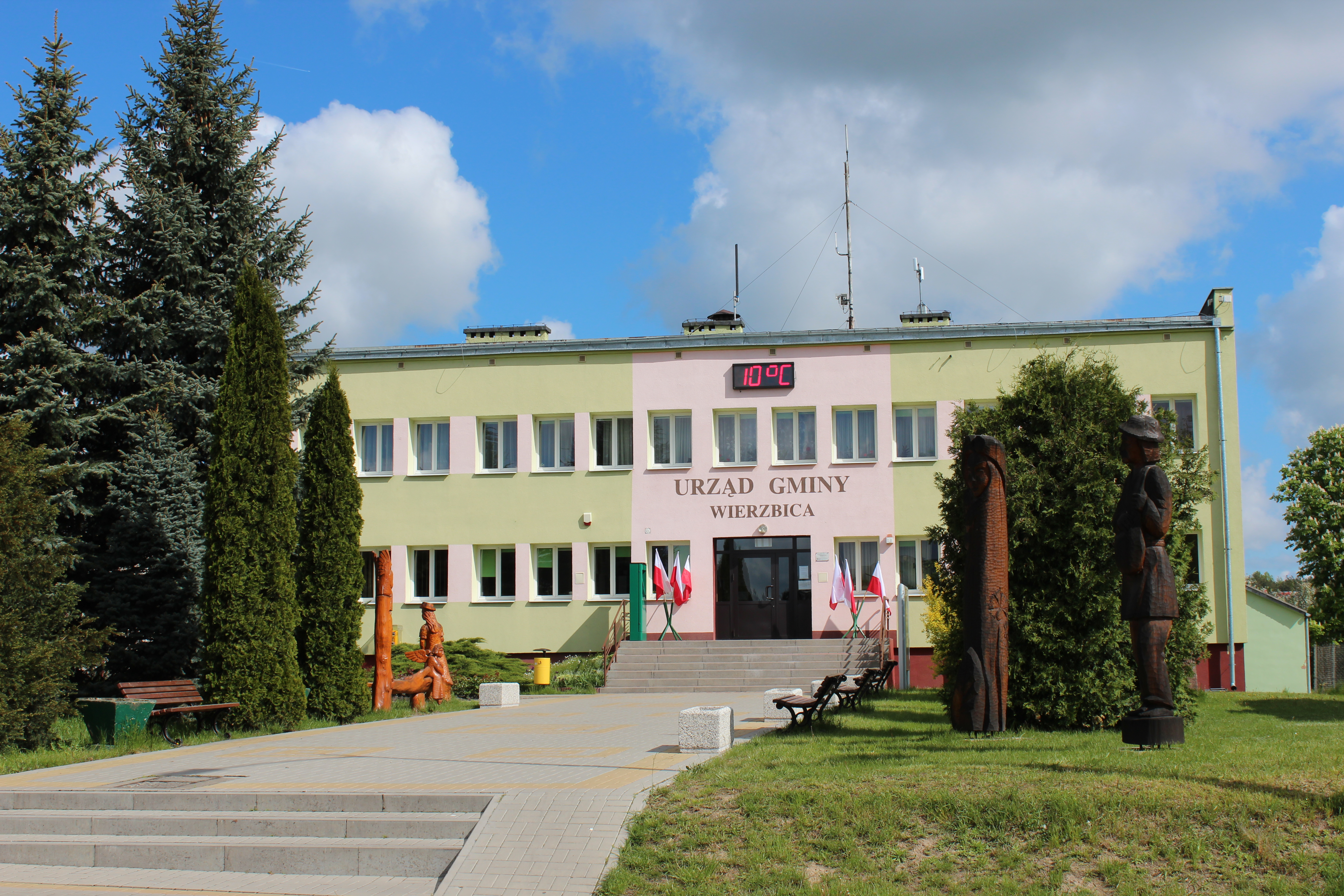

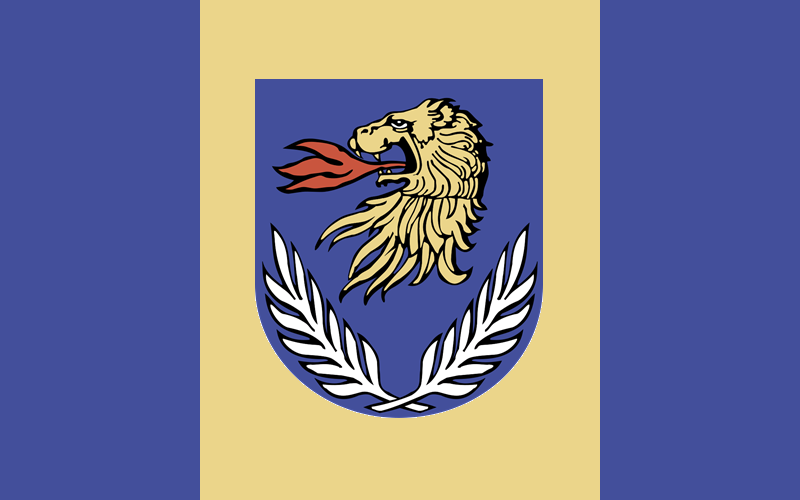
- Flag Coat of arms

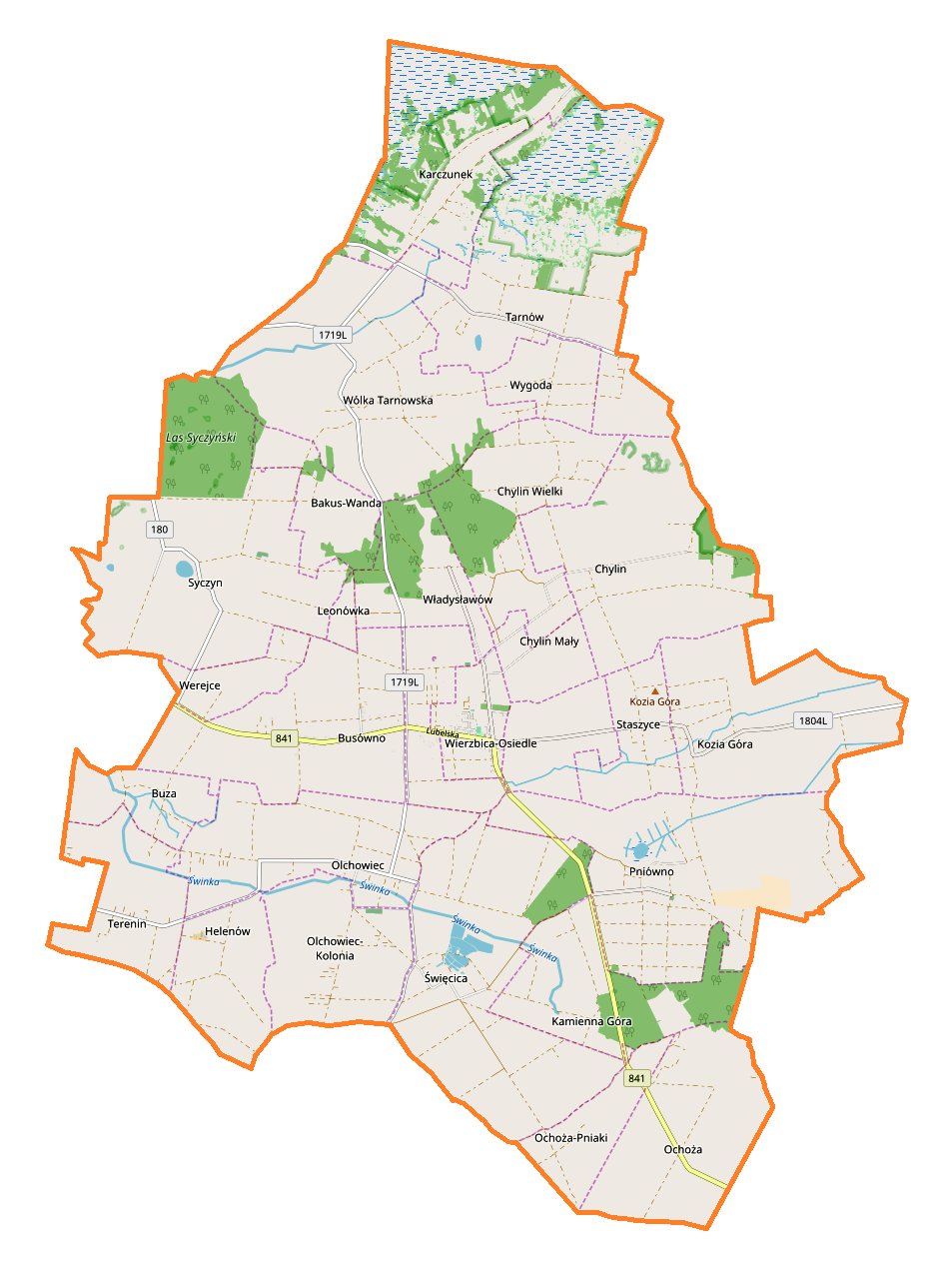
- Coordinates (Wierzbica): 51°15′44″N 23°19′13″E
- Country: Poland
- Voivodeship: Lublin
- County: Chełm County
- Seat: Wierzbica

Area
  - Total: 146.36 km^{2} (56.51 sq mi)

Population (2006)
  - Total: 5,372
  - Density: 36.70/km^{2} (95.06/sq mi)

Gmina Wierzbica is a rural gmina (administrative district) in Chełm County, Lublin Voivodeship, in eastern Poland. Its seat is the village of Wierzbica, which lies approximately 17 kilometres (11 mi) north-west of Chełm and 53 km (33 mi) east of the regional capital Lublin.

The gmina covers an area of 146.36 square kilometres (56.5 sq mi), and as of 2006 its total population is 5,372.

== Villages ==
Gmina Wierzbica contains the villages and settlements of:

- Bakus-Wanda
- Busówno
- Busówno-Kolonia
- Buza
- Chylin
- Chylin Mały
- Chylin Wielki
- Helenów
- Kamienna Góra
- Kamienna Góra-Gajówka
- Karczunek
- Kozia Góra
- Ochoża
- Ochoża-Pniaki
- Olchowiec
- Olchowiec-Kolonia
- Pniówno
- Staszyce
- Święcica
- Syczyn
- Tarnów
- Terenin
- Werejce
- Wierzbica
- Wierzbica-Osiedle
- Władysławów
- Wólka Tarnowska
- Wólka Tarnowska-Osada
- Wygoda

== Neighbouring gminas ==
Gmina Wierzbica is bordered by the town of Rejowiec Fabryczny and by the gminas of Chełm, Cyców, Hańsk, Sawin, Siedliszcze and Urszulin.
