= Wygoda, Chełm County =

Wygoda vɨˈɡɔda
- Village
- Location within Poland
- Coordinates: 51°18′46″N 23°18′44″E
- Country: Poland
- Voivodeship: Lublin
- County: Chełm
- Gmina: Wierzbica

Wygoda [vɨˈɡɔda] is a village in the administrative district of Gmina Wierzbica, within Chełm County, Lublin Voivodeship, in eastern Poland.
