= Staszyce, Lublin Voivodeship =

Staszyce
- Village
- Location within Poland
- Coordinates: 51°15′47″N 23°21′2″E
- Country: Poland
- Voivodeship: Lublin
- County: Chełm
- Gmina: Wierzbica

Population
  - Total: 80
- Time zone: UTC+1 (CET)
  - Summer (DST): UTC+2 (CEST)

Staszyce [staˈʂɨt͡sɛ] is a village in the administrative district of Gmina Wierzbica, within Chełm County, Lublin Voivodeship, in eastern Poland.

== History ==
Three Polish citizens were murdered by Nazi Germany in the village during World War II.
