= Tarnów, Lublin Voivodeship =

Tarnów
- Village
- Location within Poland
- Coordinates: 51°19′14″N 23°19′16″E
- Country: Poland
- Voivodeship: Lublin
- County: Chełm
- Gmina: Wierzbica

Tarnów [ˈtarnuf] is a village in the administrative district of Gmina Wierzbica, within Chełm County, Lublin Voivodeship, in eastern Poland.
