= Bozza =

Bozza is a surname. Notable people with the surname include:

- Anthony Bozza (fl. 1995), American author and journalist
- Eugène Bozza (1905–1991), French composer
- Tullio Bozza (1891–1922), Italian fencer

== See also ==
- Boza (name)
