= Chylin Wielki =

- Village
- Location within Poland
- Coordinates: 51°17′55″N 23°19′18″E
- Country: Poland
- Voivodeship: Lublin
- County: Chełm
- Gmina: Wierzbica

Chylin Wielki (Polish pronunciation: [ˈxɨlin ˈvjɛlkʲi]) is a village in the administrative district of Gmina Wierzbica, within Chełm County, Lublin Voivodeship, in eastern Poland.
