= Radisnyi Sad =

Rural settlement in Mykolaiv Oblast, Ukraine

Radisnyi Sad Радісний Сад
- Rural settlement
- Location of Radisnyi Sad Radisnyi Sad (Ukraine)
- Coordinates: 46°54′04″N 31°59′14″E
- Country: Ukraine
- Oblast: Mykolaiv Oblast
- Raion: Mykolaiv Raion
- Appeared: 1908
- Elevation: 28 m (92 ft)

Population (2022)
  - Total: 1,790
- Postal code: 57160
- Area code: +380 518
- Climate: Cfa

Radisnyi Sad (Ukrainian: Радісний Сад) is a rural settlement in Mykolaiv Raion, Mykolaiv Oblast, Ukraine. It hosts the administration of Radsadivska rural hromada, one of the hromadas of Ukraine. Until May 2016, it was previously known as Radsad.

The settlement is located at Bug estuary just across from Mykolaiv. The modern settlement traces its history to unnamed khutir (hamlet) that appeared in 1908 and, on territory of which in 1920, there was established a Soviet sovkhoz (state farm) that received the name of Radsad. The state farm was specializing in wine production and with dissolution of the Soviet Union was transformed into a public agricultural firm. In 1963, the state farm was honoured with a Soviet title of the "Collective of the Communist Labor". By 1970 (8th five-year plan), the state farm established in settlement a thermal power station of 1,000 kWatt, several carpentry and mechanical shops, own motor pool accounted for 25 trucks, 15 km of water pipelines, 16,000 m^{2} of residential space, children summer camp, hotel.

On territory of the settlement were found archeological settlements and burials of Scythian times (4th-3rd BCE) as well as Ancient Greek colony (3rd-1st BCE).

== Notable people ==
- Valeriy Voskonyan, Ukrainian and Armenian footballer
