= Ochoża-Pniaki =

- Village
- Location within Poland
- Coordinates: 51°12′20″N 23°19′23″E
- Country: Poland
- Voivodeship: Lublin
- County: Chełm
- Gmina: Wierzbica

Ochoża-Pniaki [ɔˈxɔʐa ˈpɲaki] is a village in the administrative district of Gmina Wierzbica, within Chełm County, Lublin Voivodeship, in eastern Poland.
