= Władysławów, Chełm County =

Village in Lublin Voivodeship, Poland

Władysławów
- Village
- Location within Poland
- Coordinates: 51°16′44″N 23°18′16″E
- Country: Poland
- Voivodeship: Lublin
- County: Chełm
- Gmina: Wierzbica

Władysławów [vwadɨˈswavuf] is a village in the administrative district of Gmina Wierzbica, within Chełm County, Lublin Voivodeship, in eastern Poland.
