= Syczyn =

- Village
- Location within Poland
- Coordinates: 51°17′N 23°15′E
- Country: Poland
- Voivodeship: Lublin
- County: Chełm
- Gmina: Wierzbica

Syczyn [ˈsɨt͡ʂɨn] is a village in the administrative district of Gmina Wierzbica, within Chełm County, Lublin Voivodeship, in eastern Poland.
