= Helenów, Chełm County =

Helenów
- Village
- Location within Poland
- Coordinates: 51°14′18″N 23°14′50″E
- Country: Poland
- Voivodeship: Lublin
- County: Chełm
- Gmina: Wierzbica

Helenów [xɛˈlɛnuf] is a village in the administrative district of Gmina Wierzbica, within Chełm County, Lublin Voivodeship, in eastern Poland.
