= Oleksandr Pyatov =

Ukrainian footballer

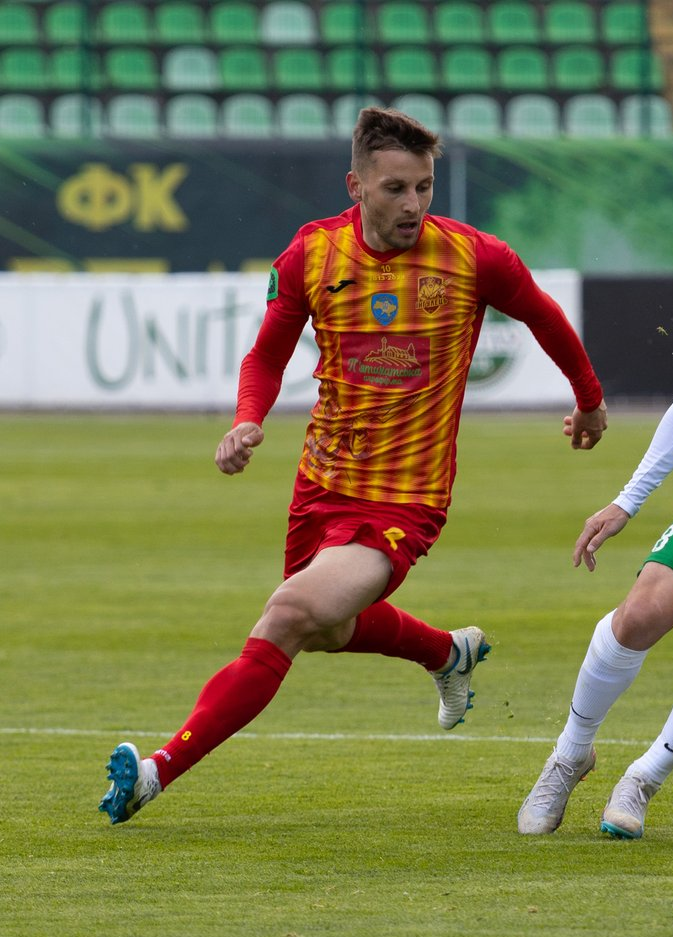

Personal information
- Full name: Oleksandr Volodymyrovych Pyatov
- Date of birth: 28 July 1996 (age 30)
- Place of birth: Pervomaisk, Ukraine
- Height: 1.77 m (5 ft 10 in)
- Position: Central midfielder

Team information
- Current team: Bratslav
- Number: 5

Youth career
- 2009–2011: BVUFK Brovary
- 2011–2012: Arsenal Bila Tserkva
- 2012–2014: BVUFK Brovary
- 2014: Halychyna Velykyi Doroshiv

Senior career*
Years	Team	Apps	(Gls)
2015	Halychyna Velykyi Doroshiv	0	(0)
2016	Mykolaiv	0	(0)
2016–2017	Real Pharma Odesa	39	(2)
2018–2019	Myr Hornostaivka	32	(0)
2019–2020	Hirnyk Kryvyi Rih	17	(0)
2020–2022	Kryvbas Kryvyi Rih	41	(5)
2022	→ Znojmo (loan)	13	(0)
2022–2023	Olimpia Zambrów	29	(0)
2023–2025	Inhulets Petrove	72	(7)
2026	Poltava	8	(0)
2026–	Bratslav	8	(4)
- * Club domestic league appearances and goals as of 25 October 2026

Oleksandr Volodymyrovych Pyatov (Ukrainian: Олександр Володимирович П'ятов; born 28 July 1996) is a Ukrainian professional footballer who plays as a central midfielder for Bratslav .

== Honours ==
Inhulets

- Ukrainian First League: 2023–24
