= Yuriy Maksymenko =

Ukrainian footballer

Personal information
- Full name: Yuriy Volodymyrovych Maksymenko
- Date of birth: 19 December 1981 (age 44)
- Place of birth: Vinnytsia, Ukrainian SSR, USSR
- Height: 1.84 m (6 ft 1/2 in)
- Position: Defender

Team information
- Current team: Bratslav Vinnytsia
- Number: 13

Senior career*
Years	Team	Apps	(Gls)
2000–2001	Stal-2 Alchevsk	2	(0)
2003–2003	Nyva Ternopil	14	(2)
2004	Sogdiana Jizzakh	3	(0)
2004–2005	FC Shahdag Qusar	4	(0)
2006	Nyva Vinnytsia	2	(0)
2007	Budfarfor Slavuta	8	(2)
2008	Horyzont Koziatyn	3	(0)
2008–2009	Bukovyna Chernivtsi	12	(2)
2008–2009	Desna Chernihiv	1	(0)
2009–2011	Desna-2 Chernihiv	24	(0)
2011–2013	Putrivka	0	(0)
2025–	Bratslav Vinnytsia	0	(0)

Managerial career
- 2025–: Bratslav Vinnytsia (Director)
- * Club domestic league appearances and goals as of 16 November 2026

Yuriy Volodymyrovych Maksymenko (Ukrainian: Юрій Володимирович Максименко) is a Ukrainian retired footballer.

== Career ==
Yuriy Maksymenko started his career in 2000 for one season with Stal-2 Alchevsk. In 2003 he moved to Nyva Ternopil where he played 14 matches and scoring 2 goals. In 2004 he moved to Sogdiana Jizzakh in Uzbekistan, then he moved to FC Shahdag Qusar in Azerbaijan. In 2006, he returned to Ukraine, joining Nyva Vinnytsia, where he played 2 matches, and in 2007 he moved to Budfarfor from Slavuta, where he played 8 matches and scored 2 goals in the 2007 Ukrainian Football Amateur League. He also played 3 matches for Horyzont Koziatyn and 12 matches with Bukovyna Chernivtsi, scoring 2 goals. In January 2009, he moved to Desna Chernihiv, the club in the city of Chernihiv where he played 1 match and also he played for Desna-2 Chernihiv for the regional competition. Then he moved to Putrivka.

== Manager Career ==
In 2025, he became the president of the Bratslav Vinnytsia team. His reorganization of the club led the team to gained their first victory in the amateur championship. In March 2026, he managed to bring into the club players like Maksym Lopyryonok, Vladyslav Shkolnyi and Kyrylo Matveev from Chornomorets, Chernihiv and Kudrivka respectively joined the club.
