= Werejce =

- Village
- Location within Poland
- Coordinates: 51°16′18″N 23°14′42″E
- Country: Poland
- Voivodeship: Lublin
- County: Chełm
- Gmina: Wierzbica

Werejce [vɛˈrɛi̯t͡sɛ] is a village in the administrative district of Gmina Wierzbica, within Chełm County, Lublin Voivodeship, in eastern Poland.
