= Vilkhivtsi =

Vilkhivtsi may refer to

== Populated places ==
- Vilkhivtsi, Zakarpattia Oblast
- Vilkhivtsi, Ivano-Frankivsk Oblast
- Vilkhivtsi, Lviv Oblast
- Vilkhivtsi, Khmelnytskyi Oblast
- Olchowiec, Bieszczady County, also known as Vilkhivtsi
- Olchowiec, Chełm County, also known as Vilkhivtsi

== Sport ==
- SC Vilkhivtsi
- FC Vilkhivtsi
