= Wólka Tarnowska-Osada =

- Village
- Location within Poland
- Coordinates: 51°19′33″N 23°16′39″E
- Country: Poland
- Voivodeship: Lublin
- County: Chełm
- Gmina: Wierzbica

Wólka Tarnowska-Osada [ˈvulka tarˈnɔfska ɔˈsada] is a settlement in the administrative district of Gmina Wierzbica, within Chełm County, Lublin Voivodeship, in eastern Poland.
