= Kamienna Góra-Gajówka =

- Village
- Location within Poland
- Coordinates: 51°13′04″N 23°20′22″E
- Country: Poland
- Voivodeship: Lublin
- County: Chełm
- Gmina: Wierzbica

Kamienna Góra-Gajówka [kaˈmjɛnna ˈɡura ɡaˈjufka] is a village in the administrative district of Gmina Wierzbica, within Chełm County, Lublin Voivodeship, in eastern Poland.
