= Ochoża, Chełm County =

Ochoża
- Village
- Location within Poland
- Coordinates: 51°13′N 23°21′E
- Country: Poland
- Voivodeship: Lublin
- County: Chełm
- Gmina: Wierzbica
- Time zone: UTC+1 (CET)
  - Summer (DST): UTC+2 (CEST)

Ochoża [ɔˈxɔʐa] is a village in the administrative district of Gmina Wierzbica, within Chełm County, Lublin Voivodeship, in eastern Poland.

== History ==
Twelve Polish citizens were murdered by Nazi Germany in the village during World War II.
