= Terenin, Lublin Voivodeship =

Terenin
- Village
- Location within Poland
- Coordinates: 51°14′10″N 23°13′25″E
- Country: Poland
- Voivodeship: Lublin
- County: Chełm
- Gmina: Wierzbica

Population
  - Total: 130

Terenin [tɛˈrɛnin] is a village in the administrative district of Gmina Wierzbica, within Chełm County, Lublin Voivodeship, in eastern Poland.
