= Olchowiec, Chełm County =

Olchowiec
- Village
- Location within Poland
- Coordinates: 51°14′40″N 23°16′36″E
- Country: Poland
- Voivodeship: Lublin
- County: Chełm
- Gmina: Wierzbica

Olchowiec [ɔlˈxɔvʲɛt͡s] is a village in the administrative district of Gmina Wierzbica, within Chełm County, Lublin Voivodeship, in eastern Poland.
