= 2022–23 Ukrainian Premier League Under-19 =

Ukrainian Premier League Under-19
- Season: 2022–23

The 2022–23 Ukrainian Premier League Under-19 season were competitions between the youth teams of the Ukrainian Premier League.

== Teams ==
Entering	Replaced
Kryvbas Kryvyi Rih; Metalist Kharkiv	Desna Chernihiv; FC Mariupol

== League table ==
Pos	Team	Pld	W	D	L	GF	GA	GD	Pts	Qualification or relegation
1	Rukh Lviv	30	26	4	0	91	17	+74	82	Qualification to Domestic Champions path
2	Dynamo Kyiv	30	23	5	2	72	21	+51	74	
3	Shakhtar Donetsk	30	21	6	3	70	19	+51	69	Qualification to UEFA Champions League Path
4	Oleksandriya	30	18	5	7	58	26	+32	59	
5	Vorskla Poltava	30	13	6	11	51	39	+12	45	
6	Kolos Kovalivka	30	11	10	9	40	36	+4	43	
7	Dnipro-1	30	12	5	13	41	46	−5	41	
8	Zorya Luhansk	30	11	5	14	50	54	−4	38	
9	Lviv	30	9	10	11	31	35	−4	37	Relegated
10	Metalist Kharkiv	30	9	8	13	40	68	−28	35	Relegated
11	Veres Rivne	30	9	7	14	36	46	−10	34	
12	Kryvbas Kryvyi Rih	30	8	7	15	29	55	−26	31 (Note: Head-to-head points: Kryvbas 4; Metalist 1925 1)	
13	Metalist 1925 Kharkiv	30	9	4	17	40	51	−11	31	
14	Chornomorets Odesa	30	6	7	17	28	55	−27	25	
15	Inhulets Petrove	30	3	8	19	21	72	−51	17	Relegated
16	Mynai	30	2	3	25	20	78	−58	9	

Source: Ukrainian Premier League website
Rules for classification: 1) Points; 2) Head-to-head points; 3) Head-to-head goal difference; 4) Head-to-head higher number of goals scored; 5) Goal difference; 6) Higher number of goals scored; 7) Draw or "Golden match" if two teams tied for title (Article 22, paragraph 3).

=== Top scorers ===
Scorer	Team	Goals (Pen.)
(Ukraine) Vladyslav Pohorilyi	Shakhtar Donetsk	16 (1)
(Ukraine) Ivan Davydenko	Oleksandriya	14 (4)
(Ukraine) Vitaliy Lobko	Zorya Luhansk	13 (0)
(Ukraine) Illya Kvasnytsya	Rukh Lviv	12 (1)
(Ukraine) Ramik Hadzhyiev	SC Dnipro-1	12 (2)
(Ukraine) Ihor Horbach	Dynamo Kyiv	12 (2)

Source: Ukrainian Premier League website

== See also ==
- 2022–23 Ukrainian Premier League
