= Vladyslav Nekhtiy =

Ukrainian footballer

Personal information
- Full name: Vladyslav Volodymyrovych Nekhtiy
- Date of birth: 19 December 1991 (age 34)
- Place of birth: Almaty, Kazakhstan
- Height: 1.81 m (5 ft 11 in)
- Position: Midfielder

Team information
- Current team: Bratslav Vinnytsia
- Number: 33

Youth career
- 2005–2006: Metalurh Donetsk
- 2006–2008: Shakhtar Donetsk

Senior career*
Years	Team	Apps	(Gls)
2008–2013	Shakhtar Donetsk	0	(0)
2008–2010	→ Shakhtar-3 Donetsk	31	(5)
2013–2014	Kairat	16	(0)
2014–2015	Kaisar	15	(1)
2015–2016	Avanhard Kramatorsk	26	(6)
2016	Illichivets Mariupol	10	(0)
2017	Poltava	13	(3)
2017–2019	Kolos Kovalivka	72	(4)
2020	Avanhard Kramatorsk	8	(1)
2020–2022	Metalist Kharkiv	28	(7)
2022–2023	LNZ Cherkasy	22	(1)
2023–2024	Nyva Buzova	25	(2)
2024–2025	Kudrivka	16	(0)
2025–2026	Metalurh Zaporizhzhia	31	(1)
2026–	Bratslav Vinnytsia	12	(2)

International career^{‡}
2009	Ukraine U18	2	(0)
2009	Ukraine U19	6	(1)
- * Club domestic league appearances and goals as of 21 November 2026 ‡ National team caps and goals as of 26 December 2016

Vladyslav Volodymyrovych Nekhtiy (Ukrainian: Владислав Володимирович Нехтій; born 19 December 1991) is a professional footballer who plays as a midfielder who plays for Bratslav Vinnytsia. Born in Kazakhstan, he has represented Ukraine at youth level.

== Career ==
He is product of FC Shakhtar Donetsk sportive school.

Nekhtiy signed 3 years contract with FC Kairat in Kazakhstan Premier League from February 2013. In June 2014, Nekhtiy had his contract with Kairat terminated. Following his release from Kairat, Nekhtiy signed for fellow Kazakhstan Premier League side FC Kaisar in the summer of 2014, leaving them a year later in June 2015.

== Personal life ==
Along with his Ukrainian citizenship, he also possesses a Kazakh passport. Vladyslav is a son of another footballer Volodymyr Nekhtiy and is the youngest of the Volodymyr's three sons.
