= Orest Panchyshyn =

Ukrainian footballer

Personal information
- Full name: Orest Yevhenovych Panchyshyn
- Date of birth: 30 August 2000 (age 26)
- Place of birth: Novoiavorivsk, Ukraine
- Height: 1.75 m (5 ft 9 in)
- Position: Midfielder

Team information
- Current team: Feniks-Mariupol
- Number: 8

Youth career
- 2012–2019: UFK-Karpaty Lviv

Senior career*
Years	Team	Apps	(Gls)
2019–2021	Karpaty Lviv	9	(1)
2021	Mynai	0	(0)
2021–2024	Kremin Kremenchuk	58	(2)
2024	Bukovyna Chernivtsi	0	(0)
2024	→ Kremin Kremenchuk (loan)	10	(0)
2025	Podillya Khmelnytskyi	9	(0)
2025–2026	Feniks-Mariupol	14	(0)
2026–	Bratslav	13	(0)

International career
2017	Ukraine U-17	1	(0)
2018	Ukraine U-18	4	(0)
- * Club domestic league appearances and goals as of 21 November 2026

Orest Panchyshyn (Ukrainian: Орест Євгенович Панчишин; born 30 August 2000) is a Ukrainian professional footballer who plays as a midfielder for Ukrainian club Bratslav.

== Career ==
Born in Novoyavorivsk, Panchyshyn is a product of the UFK-Karpaty Lviv youth sportive school system. His first trainers were Volodymyr Vilchynskyi and Ivan Pavlyukh. But before joined UFK-Karpaty, he was trained by Zinoviy Pisyura in the football section in his native town.

He played for FC Karpaty in the Ukrainian Premier League Under-21 and Under-19 and later was promoted to the senior squad team, when Karpaty was relegated into the Ukrainian Second League. Panchyshyn made his debut for FC Karpaty as the main-squad player in the losing away match against FC Karpaty Halych on 27 September 2020 in the Ukrainian Second League, but in January 2021 signed contract with the Ukrainian Premier League FC Mynai. Panchyshyn had to buy himself out of the contract with Karpaty to join Mynai.

=== Kremin ===
Next season he moved to Ukrainian First League club Kremin Kremenchuk. He scored his debut goal for Kremin in a 3:1 win against Ahrobiznes Volochysk on 10 September 2021. Panchyshyn suffered a rupture of the cruciate ligaments of the right knee during a match against Prykarpattia Ivano-Frankivsk on 6 October 2021. He featured in 13 games and scored 2 goals in his first season with Kremin. He was fully recovered and began training on 12 July 2022. Panchyshyn signed a new one-year contract in July 2023. On 12 June 2024 Panchyshyn was released by Kremin having made fifty-eight appearances and scoring two goals.

=== Bukovyna ===
Panchyshyn joined Ukrainian First League club Bukovyna Chernivtsi in June 2024.

== Career statistics ==
As of 13 June 2024

Appearances and goals by club, season and competition
Club	Season	League			Cup		Other		Total	
Club	Season	Division	Apps	Goals	Apps	Goals	Apps	Goals	Apps	Goals
Karpaty reserves	2017–18	Ukrainian Premier League Reserves and Under 19	—		—		—		—	
Karpaty reserves	2018–19	Ukrainian Premier League Reserves and Under 19	—		—		—		—	
Karpaty reserves	2019–20	Ukrainian Premier League Reserves and Under 19	—		—		—		—	
Karpaty reserves	Total		—		—		—		—	
Karpaty	2020–21	Ukrainian Second League	9	1	1	0	—		10	1
Mynai reserves	2020–21	Ukrainian Premier League Reserves and Under 19	—		—		—		—	
Kremin	2021–22	Ukrainian First League	12	2	1	0	—		13	2
Kremin	2022–23	Ukrainian First League	20	0	—		—		20	0
Kremin	2023–24	Ukrainian First League	26	0	—		—		26	0
Kremin	Total		58	2	1	0	—		59	2
Bukovyna Chernivtsi	2024–25	Ukrainian First League	0	0	0	0	—		0	0
Career total			67	3	2	0	—		69	3

=== International ===
As of 5 January 2024

Appearances and goals by national team and year
National team	Year	Apps	Goals
Ukraine U17	2017	1	0
Ukraine U18	2018	4	0
Career total		5	0
