= Oleksandr Nasonov =

Ukrainian footballer

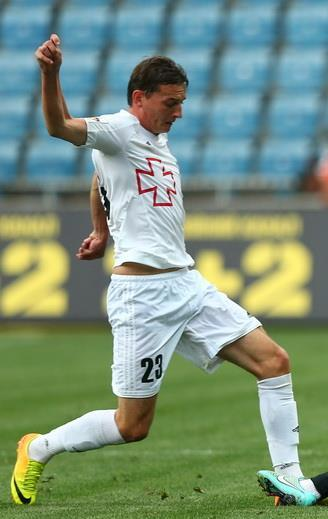

Personal information
- Full name: Oleksandr Yuriyovych Nasonov
- Date of birth: 28 April 1992 (age 34)
- Place of birth: Kyiv, Ukraine
- Height: 1.78 m (5 ft 10 in)
- Position: Defender

Team information
- Current team: Bratslav
- Number: 23

Youth career
- 2005–2006: Dynamo Kyiv
- 2006–2007: Vidradnyi Kyiv
- 2007: RVUFK Kyiv
- 2008–2009: Dnipro Dnipropetrovsk

Senior career*
Years	Team	Apps	(Gls)
2009–2012	Dnipro Dnipropetrovsk	0	(0)
2012	→ Volyn Lutsk (loan)	6	(0)
2012–2013	Volyn Lutsk	19	(0)
2013–2015	Metalurh Donetsk	36	(0)
2015	Volyn Lutsk	10	(0)
2016	Granit Mikashevichi	2	(0)
2016–2018	Mariupol	43	(0)
2018	Arsenal Kyiv	9	(0)
2019	Lviv	14	(0)
2020–2021	Speranța Nisporeni	17	(1)
2021–2022	LNZ Cherkasy	30	(3)
2022	Sokół Kleczew	10	(0)
2022	Pakhtakor Tashkent	10	(0)
2023–2024	LNZ Cherkasy	21	(0)
2024–2026	Lisne	13	(0)
2026–	Bratslav	13	(2)

International career
2009–2010	Ukraine U18	14	(1)
2010–2011	Ukraine U19	5	(0)
2012	Ukraine U20	5	(0)
2012–2014	Ukraine U21	21	(0)
- * Club domestic league appearances and goals as of 21 November 2026

Oleksandr Nasonov (Ukrainian: Олександр Юрійович Насонов; born 28 April 1992) is a Ukrainian professional footballer who plays as a defender for Bratslav.

== Career ==
Nasonov is product of youth team systems of the different Kyiv's sportive schools, and then he joined FC Dnipro Dnipropetrovsk. He did not play in the first Dnipro's team and signed a half-year loan contract with FC Volyn in February 2012.

He was called up to play for the Ukraine national under-21 football team by trainer Pavlo Yakovenko to the Commonwealth Cup in 2012.

In August 2020, the Moldovan Football Federation found three Speranța players – Nasonov, Matvey Guiganov, and Mihail Bolun – guilty of match-fixing and barred them from accessing any Moldovan football venue for one year.
