= Boża Wola =

Boża Wola may refer to the following places:

- Boża Wola, Łódź Voivodeship (central Poland)
- Boża Wola, Lublin County in Lublin Voivodeship (east Poland)
- Boża Wola, Zamość County in Lublin Voivodeship (east Poland)
- Boża Wola, Lesser Poland Voivodeship (south Poland)
- Boża Wola, Subcarpathian Voivodeship (south-east Poland)
- Boża Wola, Świętokrzyskie Voivodeship (south-central Poland)
- Boża Wola, Grodzisk County in Masovian Voivodeship (east-central Poland)
- Boża Wola, Legionowo County in Masovian Voivodeship (east-central Poland)
- Boża Wola, Mińsk County in Masovian Voivodeship (east-central Poland)
- Boża Wola, Radom County in Masovian Voivodeship (east-central Poland)
- Boża Wola, Greater Poland Voivodeship (west-central Poland)
