= Juan Boza Sánchez =

Cuban-born American artist

- Born: 1941; Camaguey, Cuba
- Died: 1991 (aged 49–50); New York City

Juan Boza Sánchez or Juan Stopper Sanchez (1941 in Camagüey, Cuba – 1991 in New York City, New York) was a gay Afro-Cuban-American artist specializing at painting, drawing, engraving, installation and graphic design.

Boza Sánchez studied at the Escuela Nacional de Bellas Artes "San Alejandro" from 1960 to 1962 and then from 1962 to 1964 at the Escuela Nacional de Arte (ENA) both located in Havana, Cuba. He was expelled from San Alejandro due to "political issues" and became a lithographer with the Experimental Graphic Workshop in 1965.

Boza Sánchez was fired as a result of the Congress of Education and Culture which convened in 1971 and led to the censorship of many artists in Cuba. In the years between 1971 and his exodus from Cuba in 1980 Boza restored religious statues to earn a living.

He died in 1991 in New York City.

== Collections ==
His work is in a number of collections: the British Broadcasting Corporation (BBC) in London, UK; the Casa de las Américas in Havana, Cuba; the Tapes Inc. Foundation in New York City; the Museum of the Independent University of Mexico in Mexico City; and the 'Museo Nacional de Bellas Artes in Havana.
