= Buza, Poland =

Buza
- Village
- Location within Poland
- Coordinates: 51°15′16″N 23°13′46″E
- Country: Poland
- Voivodeship: Lublin
- County: Chełm
- Gmina: Wierzbica

Buza [ˈbuza] is a village in the administrative district of Gmina Wierzbica, within Chełm County, Lublin Voivodeship, in eastern Poland.
