= Buza, Cluj =

Buza Búza
- Commune
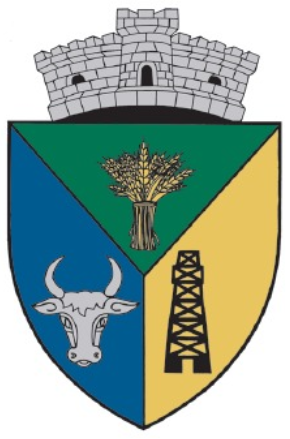
- Coat of arms

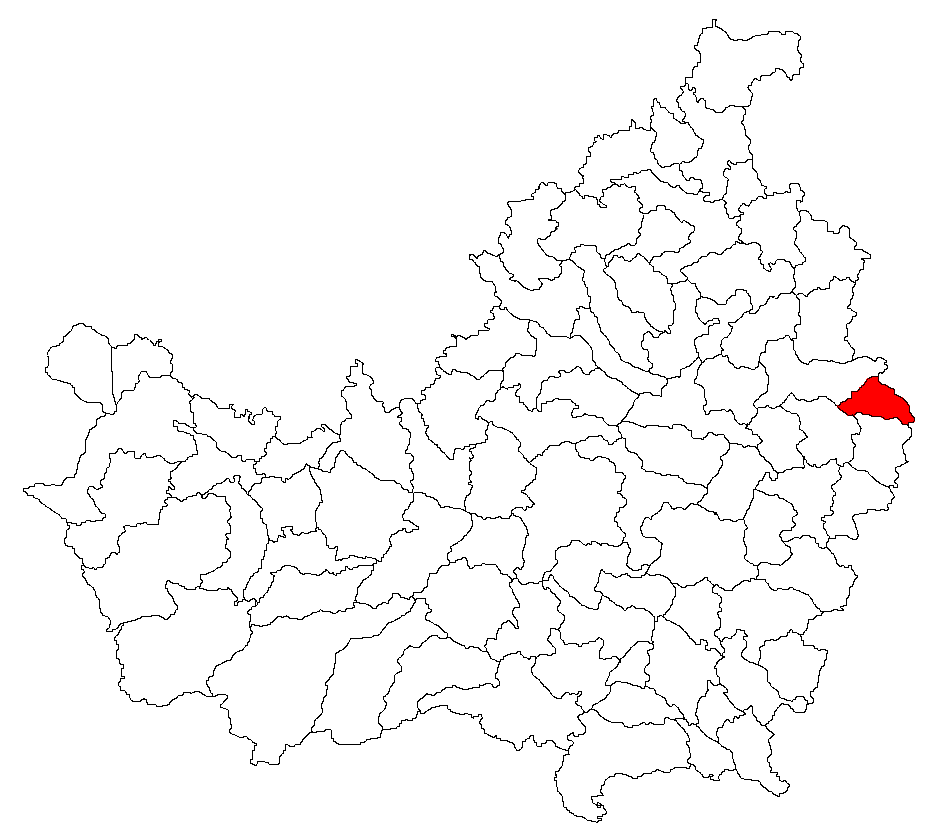
- Location in Cluj County

- Location in Romania
- Coordinates: 46°54′35″N 24°08′50″E
- Country: Romania
- County: Cluj
- Established: 1220
- Subdivisions: Buza, Rotunda

Government
  - Mayor (2020–2024): Stefan Czéghér (UDMR)
- Area: 29.37 km^{2} (11.34 sq mi)
- Elevation: 383 m (1,257 ft)
- Population (2021-12-01): 1,138
  - Density: 39/km^{2} (100/sq mi)
- Time zone: EET/EEST (UTC+2/+3)
- Postal code: 407115
- Area code: +40 x64
- Vehicle reg.: CJ
- Website: www.primariabuza.ro

Buza (Romanian: Buza; Hungarian: Búza; German: Weizendorf) is a commune in Cluj County, Transylvania, Romania. It is composed of two villages, Buza and Rotunda (Buzapuszta).

== Demographics ==
According to the 2011 census, the commune had 1,264 inhabitants; Romanians made up 47.8% of the population, Hungarians made up 46.1%, and Roma made up 4.0%. At the 2021 census, Buza had a population of 1,138; of those, 47.45% were Romanians, 42.27% Hungarians, and 7.56% Roma.
