= Ruslan Palamar =

Ukrainian footballer

Personal information
- Full name: Ruslan Yuriyovych Palamar
- Date of birth: 9 August 1993 (age 33)
- Place of birth: Odesa, Ukraine
- Height: 1.78 m (5 ft 10 in)
- Position: Midfielder

Team information
- Current team: Bratslav Vinnytsia
- Number: 22

Youth career
- 2006–2010: DYuSSh-11 Odesa
- 2011–2014: Chornomorets Odesa

Senior career*
Years	Team	Apps	(Gls)
2012–2013	Chornomorets Odesa	0	(0)
2015–2018	Zhemchuzhyna Odesa	71	(30)
2018–2019	Balkany Zorya	43	(7)
2020–2021	Mykolaiv	39	(7)
2021–2022	Hirnyk-Sport Horishni Plavni	19	(1)
2022–2023	Mynai	9	(1)
2023	Nyva Buzova	17	(7)
2024	Dinaz Vyshhorod	10	(1)
2024–2026	Viktoriya Sumy	38	(10)
2026–	Bratslav Vinnytsia	14	(6)
- * Club domestic league appearances and goals as of 21 November 2026

Ruslan Yuriyovych Palamar (Ukrainian: Руслан Юрійович Паламар; born 9 August 1993) is a Ukrainian football midfielder who plays for Bratslav Vinnytsia in Ukrainian Second League.

== Career ==
=== Chornomorets Odesa ===
Palamar is a product of FC Chornomorets Odesa youth sportive system and spent a time playing for FC Chornomorets Odesa in the Ukrainian Premier League Reserves as well few games for its senior team in the Premiers. His first coach was A.Baranov.

=== Zhemchuzhyna Odesa ===
In 2015, he joined a new amateur club Zhemchuzhyna Odesa.

=== Balkany Zorya ===
On 11 June 2018 Palamar signed contract witch Balkany Zorya after his previous club Zhemchuzhyna was dissolved.

In February 2026, he moved to Bratslav.
