= Valeriy Voskonyan =

Ukrainian footballer

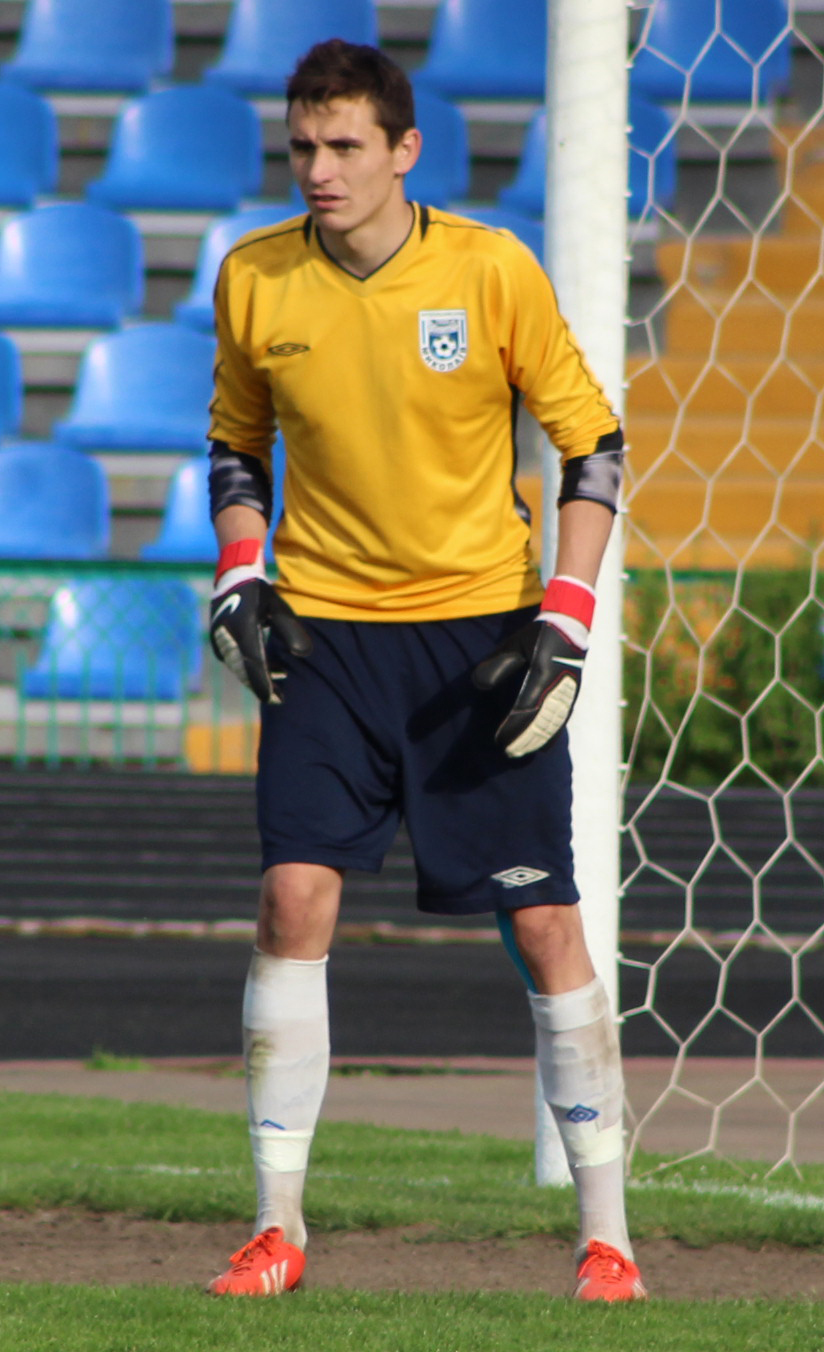

Personal information
- Full name: Valeriy Mykolayovych Voskonyan
- Date of birth: 6 April 1994 (age 32)
- Place of birth: Radisnyi Sad, Ukraine
- Height: 1.78 m (5 ft 10 in)
- Position: Goalkeeper

Team information
- Current team: Bratslav Vinnytsia
- Number: 1

Youth career
- 2007: Youth Sportive School Radsad
- 2007–2009: RVUFK Kyiv
- 2010–2012: Mykolaiv

Senior career*
Years	Team	Apps	(Gls)
2012–2016	Mykolaiv	20	(0)
2016–2018	Pyunik	27	(0)
2018–2019	Mykolaiv	2	(0)
2018–2019	→ Mykolaiv-2	15	(0)
2019	VPS	4	(0)
2019	→ VPS II	1	(0)
2020	Aragats	3	(0)
2020	Krystal Kherson	4	(0)
2021	Uzhhorod	3	(0)
2022	Lyubomyr Stavyshche		
2022–2023	Vast Mykolaiv	15	(0)
2023–2024	Inhulets Petrove	0	(0)
2024–2026	Poltava	34	(0)
2026–	Bratslav Vinnytsia	13	(0)
- * Club domestic league appearances and goals as of 21 November 2026

Valeriy Mykolayovych Voskonyan (Ukrainian: Валерій Миколайович Восконян; Armenian: Վալերի Ոսկոնյան; born 6 April 1994) is a Ukrainian and Armenian footballer who plays as a goalkeeper for Bratslav Vinnytsia.

== Career ==
Native of Mykolaiv suburbs, Voskonyan began his sports career in local sports school.

In 2016, Voskonyan signed for Armenian top flight side Pyunik from Mykolaiv in the Ukrainian second division.

In 2018, Voskonyan was invited to the Armenia national football team, but did not play a single game.

In 2019, he signed for Finnish club VPS.

In 2020, he signed for Krystal in the Ukrainian second division from Armenian second division team Aragats.

In 2024, Voskonyan was honoured as the Player of the Month for September by the "Ukrayinskyi Football" online newspaper. His performance for SC Poltava contributed to noticeable start of the Ukrainian club which took a lead in the Ukrainian First League and maintaining it in the autumn of 2024.

== Honours ==
Inhulets Petrove

- Ukrainian First League: 2023–24

Individual

- SportArena Player of the Round: 2025–26 (Round 14),
- Ukraine Premier League Player of the Round: 2025–26 (Round 14),
