= Bosa (disambiguation) =

Bosa is a town and comune in the Sardinia region of Italy.

Bosa may also refer to:

== People ==
- Bosa of York, 7th century Bishop of York
- David Bosa (born 1992), Italian speed skater
- Joey Bosa (born 1995), American football defensive end
- John Bosa (born 1964), American football defensive tackle
- Nick Bosa (born 1997), American football defensive end
- Peter Bosa (1927–1998), Canadian politician

== Other uses ==
- Bosa (Bogotá), a locality of Bogotá, Colombia
- Build One South Africa (BOSA), a political party in South Africa
- Boza, also Bosa, a fermented drink made from maize or wheat
- Bi-directional optical sub-assembly, a type of electro-optical component

== See also ==
- Bossa nova, a genre of Brazilian music
