= Máximo Arrates Boza =

Panamanian composer

Máximo Arrates Boza (also known as Maestro Chicito) (Santiago de Cuba, November 6, 1859 – August 9, 1936) was a Panamanian composer. He also played viola in the national symphony orchestra, and was a professor at the Conservatorio de Música y Declamación de Panamá.
