= Maksym Lopyryonok =

Ukrainian footballer

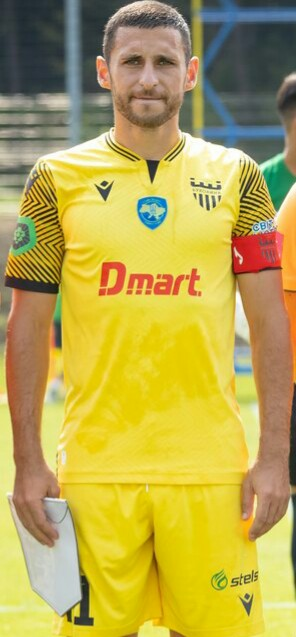

Personal information
- Full name: Maksym Ivanovych Lopyryonok
- Date of birth: 13 April 1995 (age 31)
- Place of birth: Alchevsk, Ukraine
- Height: 1.86 m (6 ft 1 in)
- Position: Defender

Team information
- Current team: Probiy Horodenka

Youth career
- 2008: UFK Dnipropetrovsk
- 2009–2012: Dnipro Dnipropetrovsk

Senior career*
Years	Team	Apps	(Gls)
2012–2017	Dnipro	20	(0)
2017–2020	Dnipro-1	80	(3)
2020	→ Mynai (loan)	10	(0)
2021	Istiklol	0	(0)
2021	Mynai	10	(0)
2021–2023	LNZ Cherkasy	42	(2)
2024–2025	Bukovyna Chernivtsi	17	(0)
2025	Chornomorets Odesa	9	(0)
2026	Bratslav	0	(0)
2026–	Probiy Horodenka	0	(0)

International career^{‡}
2010	Ukraine U16	1	(0)
- * Club domestic league appearances and goals as of 6 February 2026 ‡ National team caps and goals as of 15 July 2017

Maksym Ivanovych Lopyryonok (Ukrainian: Максим Іванович Лопирьонок; born 13 April 1995) is a Ukrainian professional footballer who plays as a defender for Probiy Horodenka.

== Career ==
Lopyryonok is a product of the UFK Dnipropetrovsk and FC Dnipro youth systems.

He made his debut for FC Dnipro in the match against FC Stal Kamianske on 30 October 2016 in the 2016–17 Ukrainian Premier League.

=== Chornomorets Odesa ===
On 13 July 2025, Lopyryonok joined Chornomorets Odesa. He made his debut for Chornomorets on 23 August 2025 against Zorya Luhansk in the 2025–26 Ukrainian Cup, and scored his first club goal. On 6 February 2026, Lopyryonok left the club.

On 16 July 2026, Lopyryonok joined Probiy Horodenka.
