= FC Bratslav Vinnytsia =

Football club based in Cherkasy

- Full name: FC Bratslav Vinnytsia
- Founded: 2016
- Ground: Sport Complex Podillia, Podillia; Nyva training base
- Capacity: 6800
- Chairman: Yuriy Maksymenko
- Manager: Yuriy Hura
- League: Ukrainian Second League
- 2025–26: Ukrainian Amateur League 6th
- Website: https://fc-bratslav.vn.ua/

FC Bratslav Vinnytsia (Ukrainian: ФК «Брацлав» Вінниця), is a football club based in Vinnytsia, Ukraine.

== Overview ==
The club was established in 2025 and was based on a children's football school, Bratslav Junior, that had existed since 2016. The club also has own sports school in Bratslav. The club's president Yuriy Maksymenko is a former professional footballer and a chairman of the Vinnytsia city football association.

== History ==
=== Origin ===
The history of the Bratslav football club began in 2016, when the Bratslav Junior youth football school was founded in Bratslav, which participated in the championship of the Ukrainian Youth Football League, but after the full-scale Russian invasion of Ukraine in 2022, most of the children went abroad, and the school's activities were suspended. After that, the school's management decided to create an adult amateur team, first to participate in the Ukrainian Football Amateur League, and then in professional competitions. In the interview with SportArena in January 2026, when asked whether the club represents Bratslav, Yuriy Maksymenko stated that the club represents the city of Vinnytsia. In 2025, the club made its debut in the Ukrainian amateur championship. On 7 March 2026 FC Bratslav gained their first victory in the amateur championship. On 8 March 2026, Maksym Lopyryonok, Vladyslav Shkolnyi and Kyrylo Matveev from Chornomorets, Chernihiv and Kudrivka respectively joined the club.

=== Ukrainian Second League ===
In 2026, the club was admitted to the 2026–27 Ukrainian Second League. In the summer of 2026, president Yuriy Maksymenko outlined his new ambitious plan, which included inviting 10 more players. Maksymenko also stated that he is looking for a new coach and is grateful to Vasyl Blinnikov for his efforts as the first manager. On 11 March 2026, Maksymenko informed that the club signed Yuriy Hura as the new manager. At the same time, in an interview with Ukrfootball on 29 May 2026, Hura said that he is still thinking whether to take charge of Bratslav. On July 14, 2026, it was officially announced that the club was included on the list of teams participating in the Ukrainian Second League, Group A, for the 2026-27 season. In summer 2026 Maksym Lopyryonok left the club signing with Probiy Horodenka in Ukrainian First League

On 1 August 2026, Bratslav played their first game at professional level facing Podillya Khmelnytskyi at Kolos Stadium in Stavyshche, Kyiv Oblast. They won the game 3:2 by scoring two goals in the final minutes. The first goal for Bratslav scored Pavlo Fedosov.

== Infrastructure ==
The club started playing at the Nyva training base in Vinnytsia. After the team was admitted to the Ukrainian Second League, it was announced that the team may move to the Sport Complex Podillia in Podillia. Their first game in the Second League, Bratslav played at Kolos Stadium in Stavyshche.

== Players ==
=== Current squad ===
As of 4 October 2026

Note: Flags indicate national team as defined under FIFA eligibility rules; some limited exceptions apply. Players may hold more than one non-FIFA nationality.

No.	Pos.	Nation	Player
1	GK	ARM	Valeriy Voskonyan
4	MF	UKR	Valentyn Koreshkov
6	MF	UKR	Danylo Hrabovetskyi
7	FW	UKR	Pavlo Fedosov
8	MF	UKR	Orest Panchyshyn
9	FW	UKR	Valentyn Ovcharuk
10	MF	UKR	Vadym Panasyuk
11	MF	UKR	Maksym Kulish
12	GK	UKR	Dmytro Yashchenko
13	FW	UKR	Yuriy Maksymenko
17	DF	UKR	Vladyslav Shkolnyi
19	MF	UKR	Vladyslav Komunitskyi
20	DF	UKR	Mykola Yarosh

No.	Pos.	Nation	Player
21	DF	UKR	Nikita Bahinskyi
22	MF	UKR	Ruslan Palamar
23	DF	UKR	Oleksandr Nasonov
29	MF	UKR	Vladyslav Solovey
30	MF	NGR	Michael Obamina
31	GK	UKR	Dmytro Yashchenko
33	MF	UKR	Vladyslav Nekhtiy
35	DF	UKR	Andriy Bohoslavskyi
66	DF	UKR	Maksym Strads
71	GK	UKR	Ilya Moskovchenko
77	MF	UKR	Oleksiy Bandurin
85	MF	UKR	Taras Shtokal
99	DF	UKR	Volodymyr Shvets

== Personnel ==
Position	Staff
President	(Ukraine) Yuriy Maksymenko
Head coach	(Ukraine) Yuriy Hura
Sports director	(Ukraine) Volodymyr Krakovetskyi

=== Former managers ===
- 2025–2026 Vasyl Blinnikov

== League and cup history ==
Season	Div.	Pos.	Pl.	W	D	L	GS	GA	P	Domestic Cup	Europe		Notes
2025–26	4th "2" (Amateur League)	6_{/9}	16	5	1	10	25	54	16	-	-	-	Admitted to SL
2026–27	3rd "A" (Second League)	1st	14	8	5	1	31	13	29	Round of 64 (1/32)	-	-	-
