= Sport Complex Podillia =

Stadium in Khmelnytskyi, Ukraine

Podillia Stadium
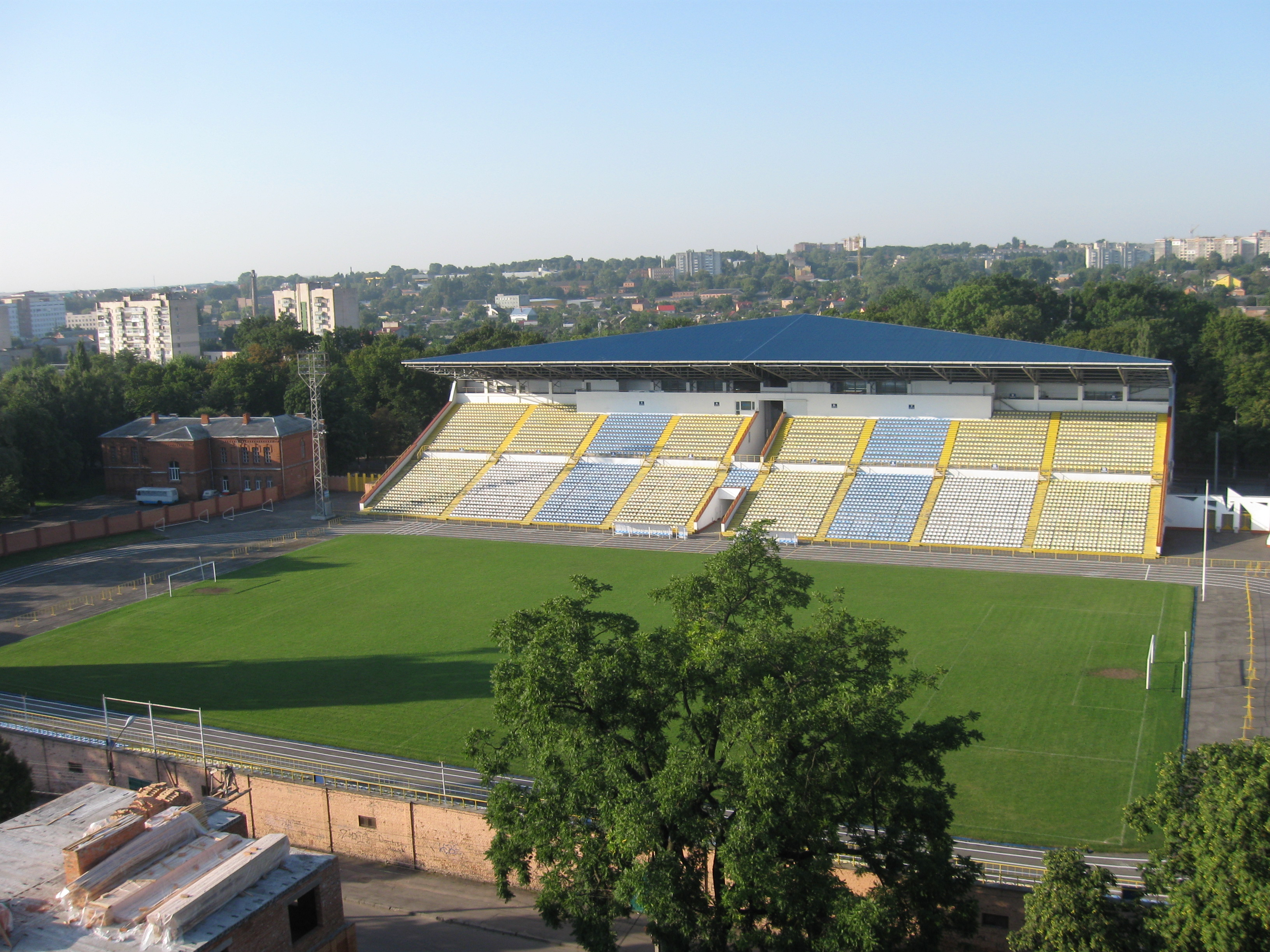
- in 2008
- Interactive map of Podillia Stadium
- Location: Khmelnytskyi, Ukraine
- Coordinates: 49.420556°N 26.995556°E
- Capacity: 6,811 (football)
- Surface: Grass
- Field size: 105x68

Tenant
- FC Podillia Khmelnytskyi

The Sport Complex Podillia (also known as the Podillia Stadium; Ukrainian: Спортивний комплекс «Поділля»; Sportyvnyĭ kompleks "Podillia") is a sports facility in Khmelnytskyi, Ukraine.

The stadium is the central stadium in Khmelnytskyi Oblast and a home stadium of Ukrainian football club Podillia Khmelnytskyi.

The stadium is located in the city's centre near the Franko City Park, a city hospital, and the Border Service Academy.

Beside football competitions, the stadium is being actively used for various track and field (light athletics) competitions.

== Gallery ==
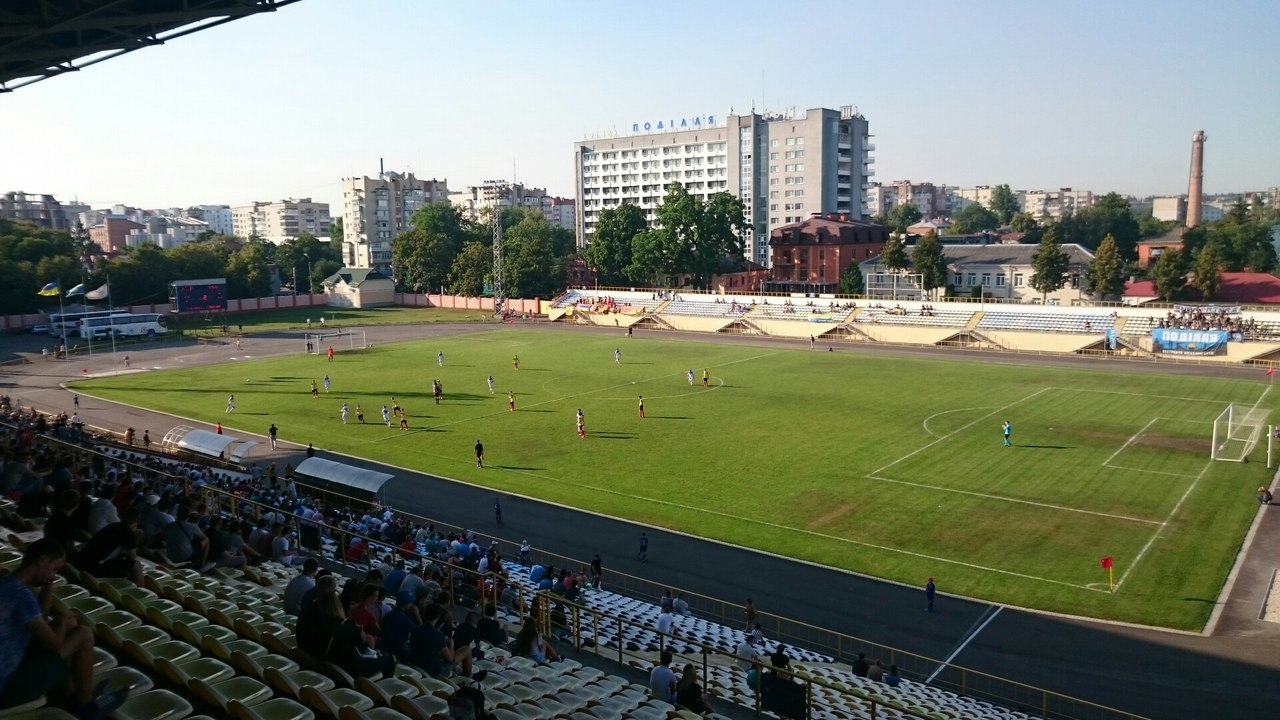
Podillia – Metalurh game in 2016

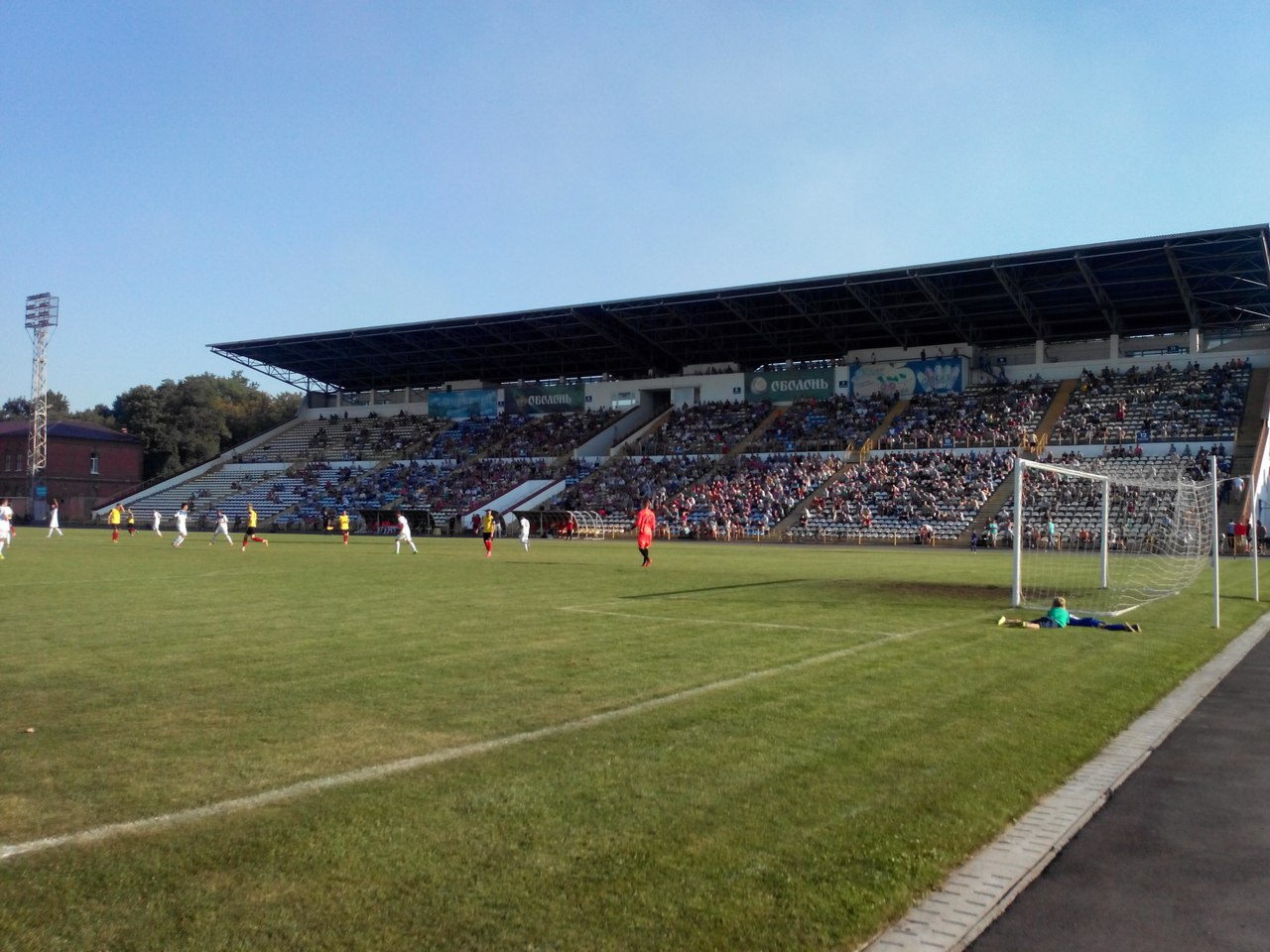
Field view at the Podillia – Metalurh game

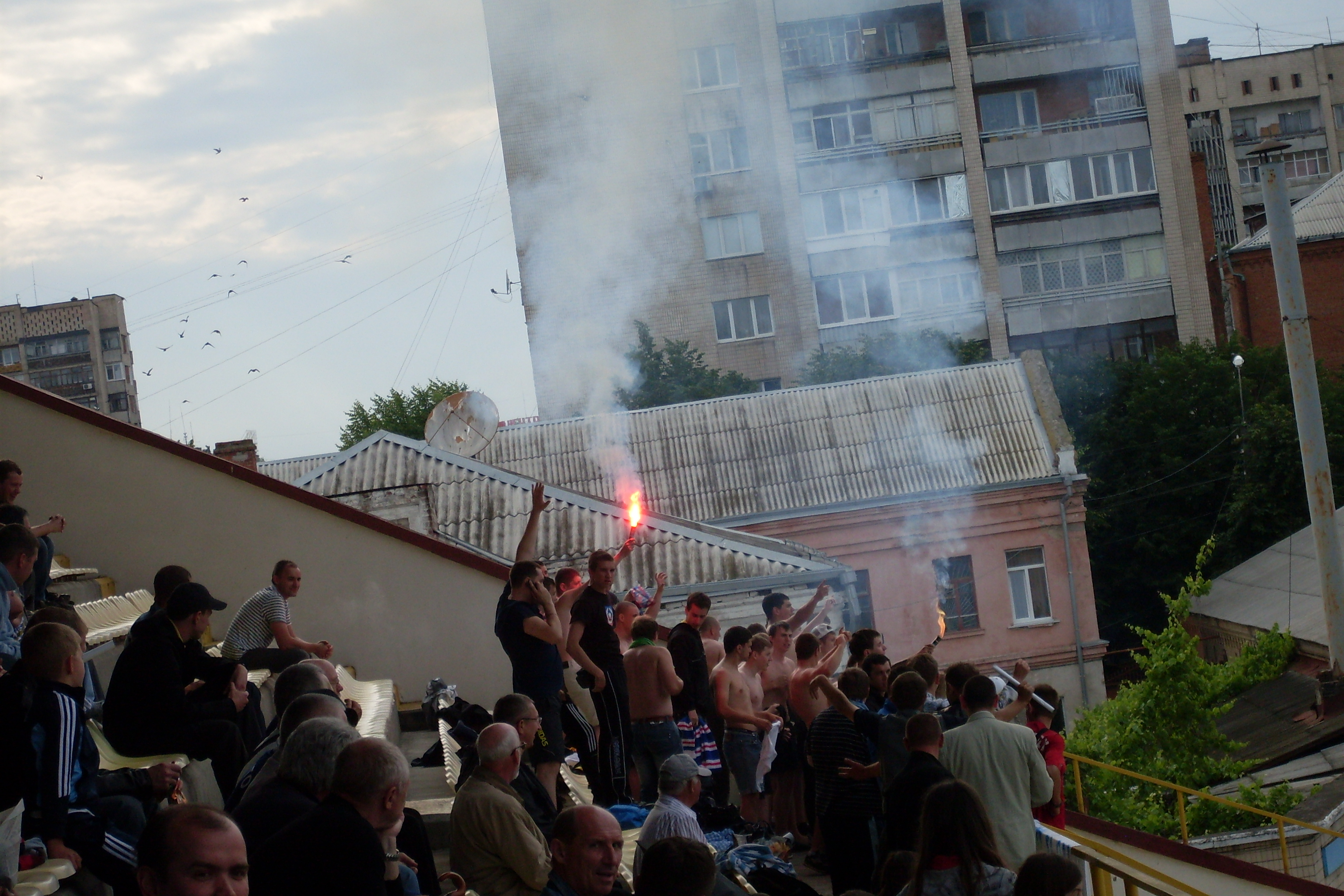
Visiting MFC Mykolaiv fans in 2012

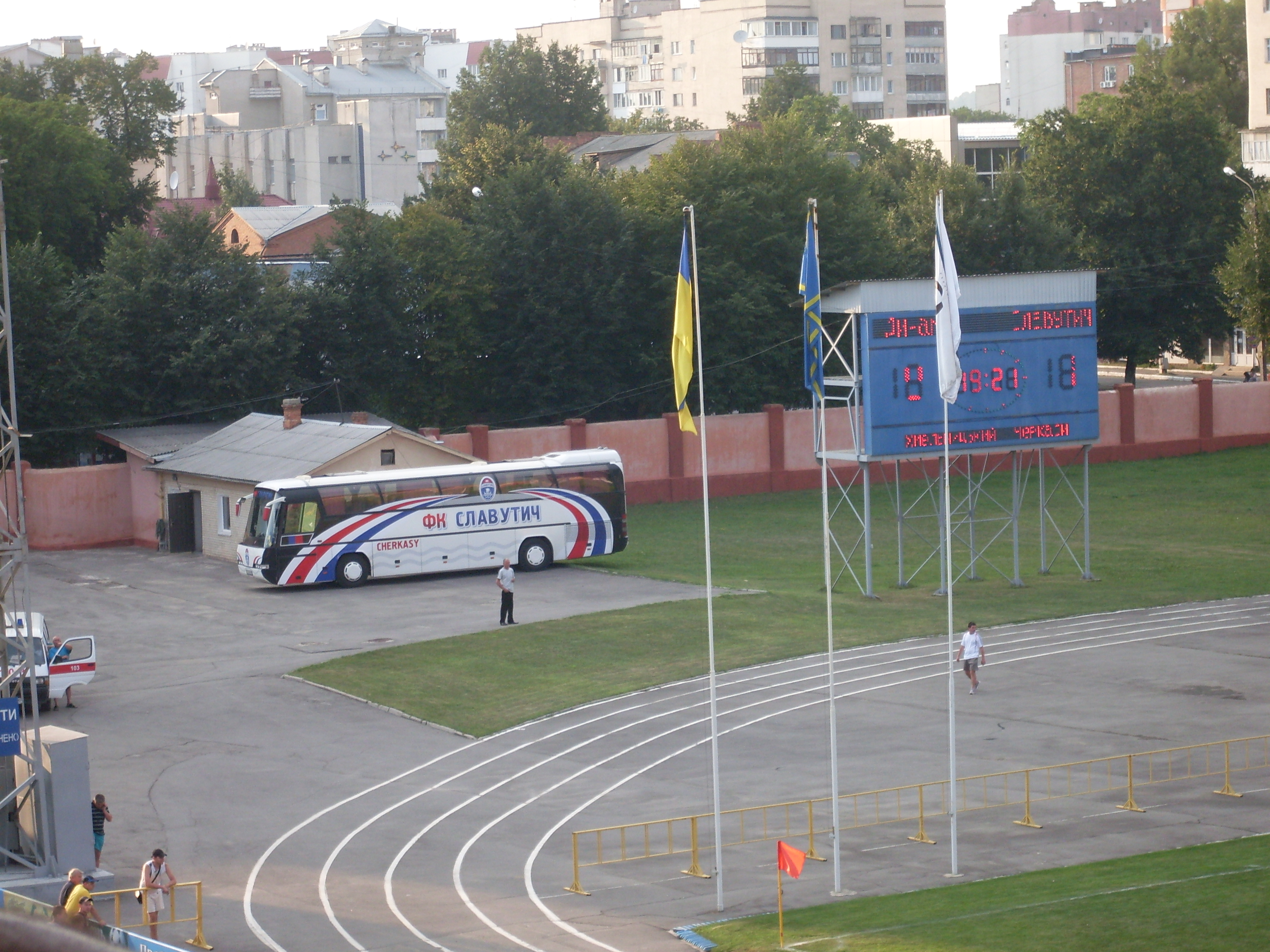
A bus of FC Slavutych (now FC Cherkashchyna) in 2012

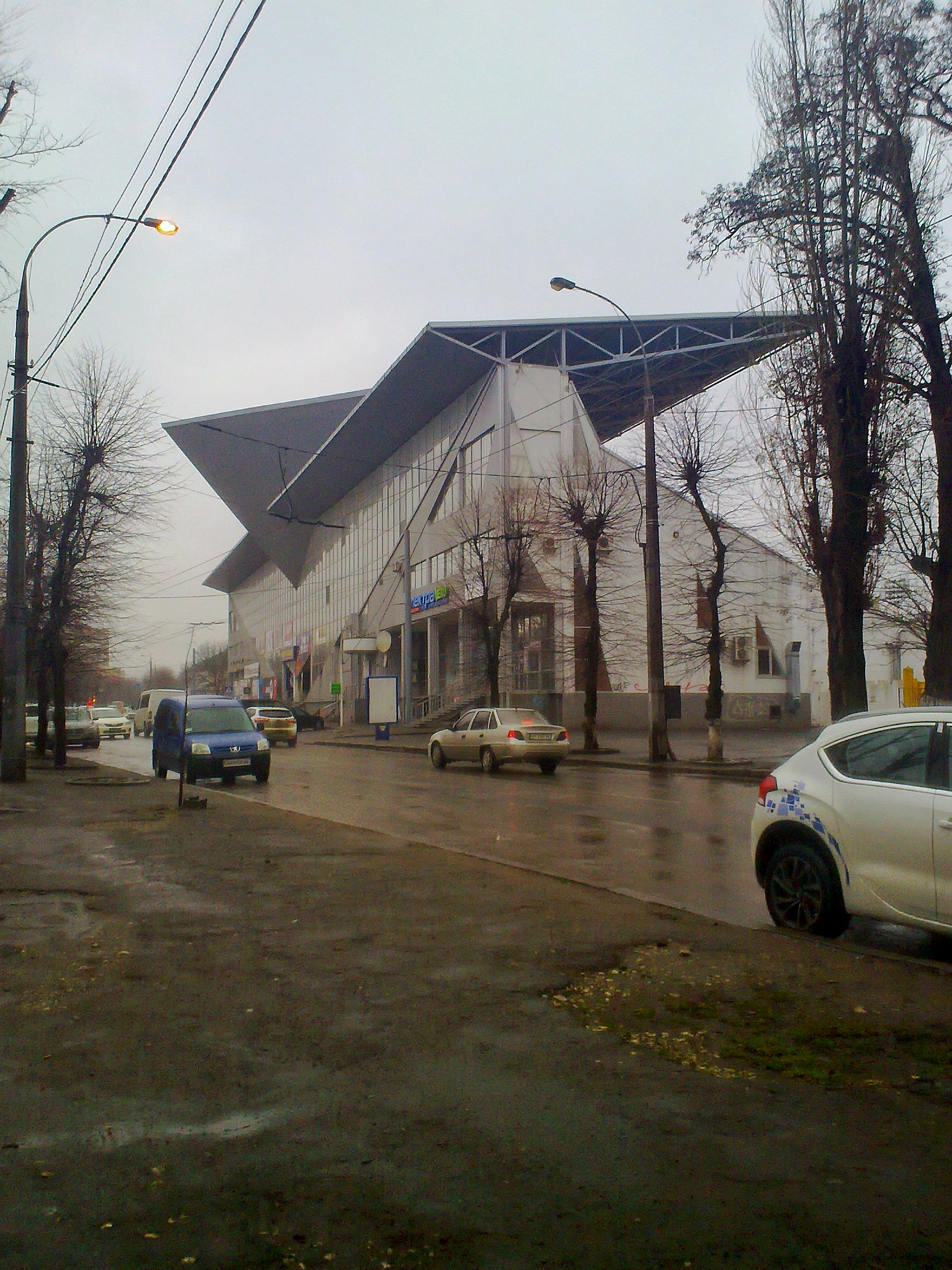
Street view of the main stand in 2018

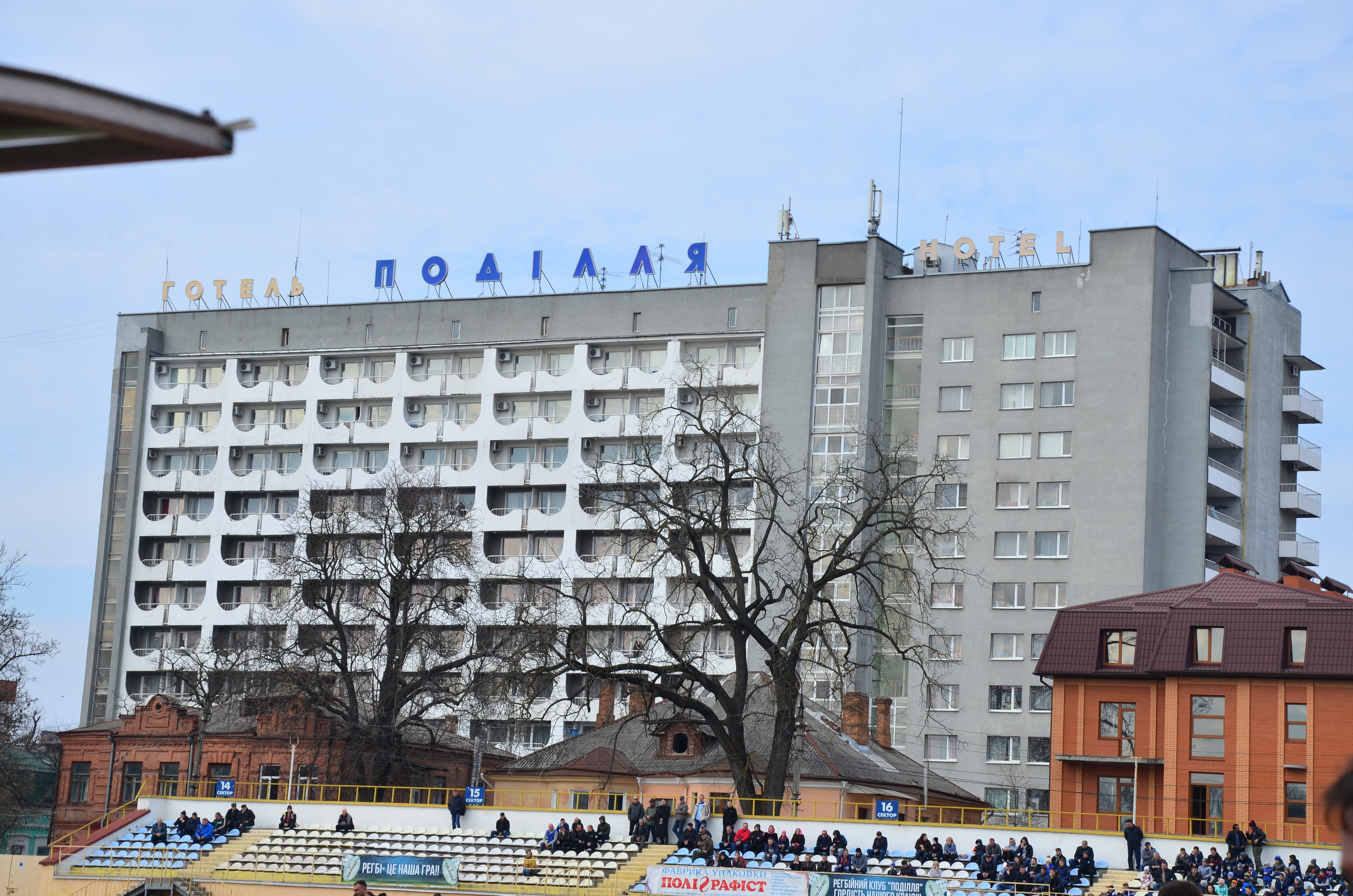
Hotel Podillia in 2019

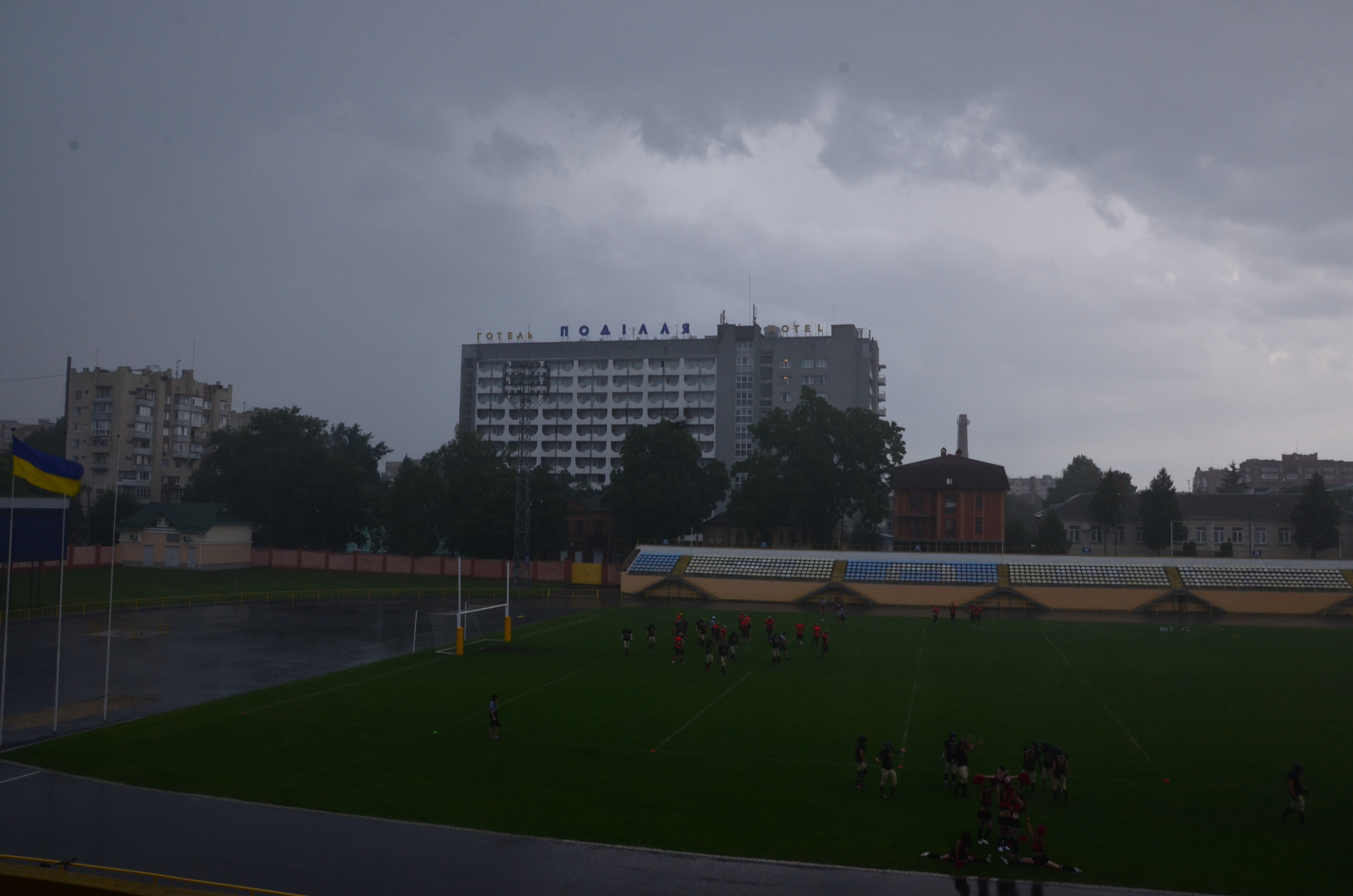
An American football game in 2016

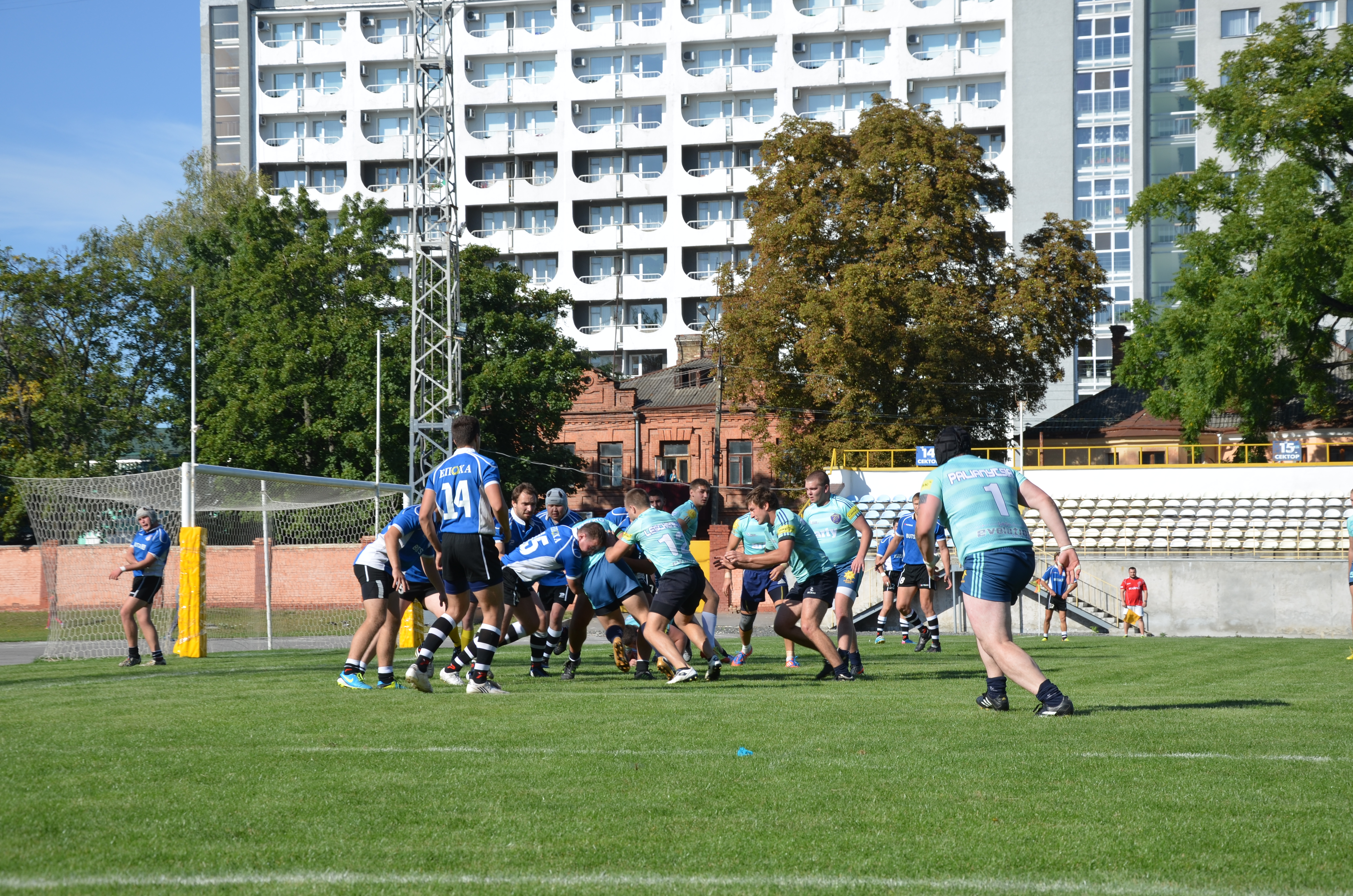
A rugby game in 2014
