= 2024–25 Ukrainian Cup =

Tournament details
- Country: Ukraine
- Dates: 3 August 2024–14 May 2025; 3 August 2024–22 August 2024 (preliminary rounds); October 2024–14 May 2025 (main event)
- Teams: 49

Final positions
- Champions: Shakhtar Donetsk (15th title)
- Runners-up: Dynamo Kyiv
- Semifinalists: Polissya Zhytomyr; Bukovyna Chernivtsi
- UEFA Europa League: Shakhtar Donetsk

Tournament statistics
- Matches played: 48
- Goals scored: 131 (2.73 per match)
- Attendance: 41,659 (868 per match)
- Top goal scorer: Bohdan Orynchak (4 goals)
- All statistics correct as of 14 May 2025. 33 out of 48 games had attendance

The 2024–25 Ukrainian Cup was the 33rd annual season of Ukraine's football knockout competition. The competition started on 3 August 2024 and concluded on 14 May 2025 with the final. Champions qualified for the first qualifying round 2025-26 UEFA Europa League.

As in the previous season, due to security concerns, certain limitations of attendance were recommended by the government.

All competition rounds consisted of a single game with a home field advantage granted to a team from lower league. Draw for all the rounds was blind.

== Team allocation and schedule ==
The competition includes all professional first teams from the Premier League (16/16 teams of the league), First League (18/18), Second League (13/20) and 2 best performer from the previous year's Amateur Cup. Seven clubs' second teams all from the Second League are not eligible for the tournament.

Distribution
	Teams entering in this round	Teams advancing from previous round
First preliminary round (32 teams)	17 entrants from the First League; 13 entrants of the Second League; 2 entrants of the 2023–24 Amateur Cup	
Second preliminary round (18 teams)	2 entrants from the mini tournament finals	16 winners from the First preliminary round
Third preliminary round (16 teams)	7 entrants from the Premier League	9 winners from the Second preliminary round
Round of 16 (16 teams)	8 entrants from the Premier League	8 winners from the Third preliminary round

=== Rounds schedule ===
Phase	Round	Number of fixtures	Clubs remaining	Draw date	Game date
Preliminary	First round	16	32 → 16	26 July 2024	3 and 4 August 2024
Preliminary	Second round	9	18 → 9	5 August 2024	11-13 August 2024
Preliminary	Third round	8	16 → 8	14 August 2024	21-22 August 2024
Main event	Round of 16	8	16 → 8	28 August 2024	30 October 2024
Main event	Quarter-finals	4	8 → 4	8 November 2024	2 April 2025
Main event	Semi-finals	2	4 → 2	April 2025	23 April 2025
Main event	Final	1	2 → 1	April 2025	14 May 2025

=== Teams ===
Enter in First Round			Enter in Second Round	Enter in Third Round	Enter in Round of 16
AAFU; 2 teams	PFL League 2; 13/20 teams	PFL League 1; 17/18 teams	"Mini tournament final" 2 teams	UPL; 7/16 teams	UPL; 8/16 teams
FC Mykolaiv; Olympia Savyntsi*	Chaika Petropavlivska B; FC Chernihiv; Hirnyk-Sport; FC Kulykiv*; Lokomotyv Kyiv; Nyva Vinnytsia; Probiy Horodenka*; Real Pharma Odesa; Revera 1908 Ivano-Frankivsk*; Skala Stryi; FC Trostianets; FC Uzhhorod; SC Vilkhivtsi*	Ahrobiznes Volochysk; Bukovyna Chernivtsi; Dinaz Vyshhorod; Epitsentr Kamianets-Podilskyi; FC Khust; Kremin Kremenchuk; FC Kudrivka; FSC Mariupol; Metalist Kharkiv; Metalist 1925 Kharkiv; Metalurh Zaporizhia; Nyva Ternopil; Podillya Khmelnytskyi; SC Poltava; Prykarpattia Ivano-Frankivsk; UCSA Tarasivka; Viktoriya Sumy	UPL: Livyi Bereh Kyiv; PFL League 1: FC Mynai	Chornomorets Odesa; Inhulets Petrove; Karpaty Lviv; Kolos Kovalivka; Obolon Kyiv; Veres Rivne; Zorya Luhansk	Dynamo Kyiv; Kryvbas Kryvyi Rih; LNZ Cherkasy; FC Oleksandriya; Polissya Zhytomyr; Rukh Lviv; Shakhtar Donetsk; Vorskla Poltava

Notes:

- With the asterisk (*) are noted the Second League teams that were recently admitted to the league from amateurs and the AAFU (amateur) team(s) that qualified in place of the Amateur Cup finalist(s).
- For the AAFU qualification, Mykolaiv and Shturm Ivankiv were eligible. However, Shturm Ivankiv merged with Kolos Kovalivka as the latter's reserve team. The place of Shturm was filled by one of semifinalists Olympia Savyntsi.
- Seven reserve teams from the PFL League 2 were not eligible to participate.
- Mini tournament was organized during the summer break due to abrupt withdrawal of SC Dnipro-1.
- Teams that were making their first appearance (4): Kulykiv-Bilka, Probiy Horodenka, Revera 1908 Ivano-Frankivsk, Vilkhivtsi.

== Bracket ==
The following is the tournament bracket that demonstrates the last four rounds of the Ukrainian Cup, including the final match. Numbers in parentheses next to the match score represent the results of a penalty shoot-out.

Third round 21–22 August 2024
21 August 2024
Olimpiya Savyntsi	1
Zorya Luhansk	4
22 August 2024
FC Kudrivka	0
UCSA Tarasivka	4
21 August 2024
Kolos Kovalivka	0 (4)
Obolon Kyiv (p)	0 (5)
22 August 2024
Metalist 1925 Kharkiv	0
Veres Rivne	4
21 August 2024
Probiy Horodenka (p)	2 (4)
Inhulets Petrove	2 (2)
21 August 2024
FC Mykolaiv	1
Bukovyna Chernivtsi	2
21 August 2024
FC Mynai	0
Viktoriya Sumy	2
21 August 2024
Karpaty Lviv	3
Chornomorets Odesa	0

Round of 16; 29–30 October 2024
30 October 2024
Shakhtar Donetsk	1
Zorya Luhansk	0
30 October 2024
UCSA Tarasivka	1
FC Oleksandriya	4
30 October 2024
Polissya Zhytomyr	2
Kryvbas Kryvyi Rih	1
30 October 2024
Veres Rivne (a.e.t.)	2
Obolon Kyiv	1
30 October 2024
Probiy Horodenka	0
Bukovyna Chernivtsi	1
30 October 2024
Viktoriya Sumy (p)	2 (3)
LNZ Cherkasy	2 (1)
29 October 2024
Rukh Lviv	1
Karpaty Lviv	0
30 October 2024
Vorskla Poltava	1
Dynamo Kyiv (a.e.t.)	2

Quarter-finals; 1-2 April 2025
2 April 2025
FC Oleksandriya	0
Shakhtar Donetsk (a.e.t.)	1
2 April 2025
Veres Rivne	0
Polissya Zhytomyr (a.e.t.)	1
1 April 2025
Bukovyna Chernivtsi	2
Viktoriya Sumy	1
2 April 2025
Rukh Lviv	0
Dynamo Kyiv	1

Semi-finals; 23 April 2025
23 April 2025
Polissia Zhytomyr	0
Shakhtar Donetsk (a.e.t.)	1
23 April 2025
Bukovyna Chernivtsi	1
Dynamo Kyiv	4

Final; 14 May 2025
14 May 2025
Shakhtar Donetsk (p)	1 (6)
Dynamo Kyiv	1 (5)

== Competition schedule ==
Legends: AM – AAFU (amateur) competitions (IV tier), 2L – Second League (III tier), 1L – First League (II tier), PL – Premier League (I tier)

=== First preliminary round (1/64) ===
In this round, 17 clubs from the First League, 13 clubs from the Second League and 2 participants of the 2023–24 Amateur Cup.

The draw was held on 26 July 2024 with participation of Andriy Vorobey and Vitaliy Danylchenko.

3 August 2024	Chernihiv (2L)	1–0	(2L) Chaika Petropavlivska Borshchahivka	Chernihiv
	Fedosov 69'	Report	Sychevskyi (yellow card) 39' (yellow-red card) 71'	Stadium: Yunist Stadium; Referee: O.Harkusha (Zhytomyr)

3 August 2024	Real Pharma Odesa (2L)	0–3	(1L) UCSA Tarasivka	Odesa
		Report	Castro 28'; Khovaiko 33'; Vavá Guerreiro 67'	Stadium: Ivan; Referee: A.Artemenko (Mykolaiv)

3 August 2024	Dinaz Vyshhorod (1L)	1–2	(1L) Kudrivka	Bucha, Kyiv Oblast
	Seytkhalilov 41'; Yarmak (yellow card) 52' (yellow-red card) 63'	Report	Storchous 11'; Rohozynskyi 90'	Stadium: Yuvileinyi; Referee: R.Halitsyn (Sumy)

3 August 2024	Viktoriya Sumy (1L)	1–0	(1L) Metalurh Zaporizhia	Sumy
	Knysh 45+1'	Report		Stadium: Yuvileinyi; Referee: V.Orendochka (Poltava)

3 August 2024	Hirnyk-Sport Horishni Plavni (2L)	3–1	(1L) Mariupol	Horishni Plavni, Poltava Oblast
	Onishchenko 62', 78'; Studenko 69'	Report	Savin 32'	Stadium: Yunist; Referee: A.Voyevoda (Dnipro)

3 August 2024	Lokomotyv Kyiv (2L)	1–4	(1L) Metalist 1925 Kharkiv	Kyiv
	Karanha 80'	Report	Sydorov 24', 32'; Sten 45'; Moura 49'	Stadium: imeni Bannikova; Attendance: 203; Referee: A.Hordynskyi (Vinnytsia)

3 August 2024	Kulykiv (2L)	0–0 (4–2 p)	(2L) Nyva Vinnytsia	Kulykiv, Lviv Oblast
		Report		Stadium: Arena Kulykiv; Attendance: 360; Referee: R.Molnar (Uzhhorod)
	Penalties
	Panasyuk (penalty missed); Nychyporenko (penalty scored); Bilyi (penalty scored); Pylypchuk (penalty scored); Ilyukhin (penalty scored)		(penalty scored) Boryachuk; (penalty scored) Yevtikhov; (penalty missed) Khorenzhenko; (penalty missed) Melnyk

3 August 2024	Trostianets (2L)	0–1	(1L) Poltava	Trostianets, Sumy Oblast
		Report	Streltsov 39'	Stadium: imeni Kutsa; Attendance: 96; Referee: S.Dubykivskyi (Kyiv Oblast)

3 August 2024	Revera 1908 Ivano-Frankivsk (2L)	2–2 (2–4 p)	(1L) Podillia Khmelnytskyi	Ivano-Frankivsk
	Pashchak 36'; Uhrynyuk 120'; Burtnyk (yellow card) 31' (yellow-red card) 102'	Report	Orobets 75'; Kostenko 93'; Kulakevych (yellow card) 82' (yellow-red card) 113'	Stadium: imeni Hemby; Attendance: 296; Referee: Ya.Leskiv (Lviv Oblast)
	Penalties
	Kukurudz (penalty missed); Uhrynyuk (penalty scored); Shkolnyi (penalty scored); Neledva (penalty missed)		(penalty scored) Tsybulnyk; (penalty scored) Veremiyenko; (penalty scored) Kostenko; (penalty scored) Koreshkov

3 August 2024	Vilkhivtsi (2L)	0–0 (5–6 p)	(1L) Metalist Kharkiv	Vilkhivtsi, Zakarpattia Oblast
		Report; Report (Metalist)		Stadium: Vilkhivtsi Arena Park; Attendance: 300; Referee: T.Kozak (Lviv Oblast)
	Penalties
	Hlahola (penalty missed); Nemchaninov (penalty scored); Panasenko (penalty scored); Shestakov (penalty scored); Funduk (penalty scored); Havrylyuk (penalty scored); Bazarov (penalty missed)		Bahachanskyi (penalty scored); Dihtyar (penalty scored); Horenko (penalty missed); Abramov (penalty scored); Porokh (penalty scored); Kaydalov (penalty scored); Vernattus (penalty scored)

3 August 2024	Skala 1911 Stryi (2L)	2–0	(1L) Epitsentr Kamianets-Podilskyi	Morshyn, Lviv Oblast
	Averyanov 11'; Yanata 36'	Report		Stadium: Medyk; Referee: I.Mandzyuk (Ternopil Oblast)

3 August 2024	Uzhhorod (2L)	0–4	(1L) Prykarpattia Ivano-Frankivsk	Uzhhorod
		Report	Kos 6', 47'; Ilchuk 23' (o.g.); Shvets 43'	Stadium: Avanhard; Attendance: 300; Referee: M.Baidyuk (Chernivtsi)

3 August 2024	Mykolaiv (AM)	1–0	(1L) Ahrobiznes Volochysk	Mykolaiv, Lviv Oblast
	Hloba 45+1' (o.g.)	Report		Stadium: Miskyi; Attendance: 650; Referee: A.Shevchuk (Volyn Oblast)

3 August 2024	Nyva Ternopil (1L)	1–1 (3–4 p)	(1L) Bukovyna Chernivtsi	Ternopil
	Riznyk 14'	Report; Report (Bukovyna)	Kilyevyi 16'	Stadium: Miskyi; Attendance: 450; Referee: V.Malyar (Khmelnytskyi)
	Penalties
	Kukharuk (penalty scored); Doroshenko (penalty scored); Holub (penalty missed); Kytsun (penalty scored); Zin (penalty missed)		Tyshchenko (penalty scored); Shynkarenko (penalty scored); Morhovskyi (penalty scored); Koltsov (penalty scored)

4 August 2024	Olimpiya Savyntsi (AM)	2–0	(1L) Kremin Kremenchuk	Poltava
	Rudenko 30'; Koshman 41'	Report		Stadium: Molodizhnyi; Referee: Yevhenii Makarenko (Sumy)

4 August 2024	Probiy Horodenka (2L)	4–0	(1L) Khust	Horodenka, Ivano-Frankivsk Oblast
	Filipovych 2'; Sondey 23' (pen.); Orynchak 28', 37'	Report		Stadium: Kolos; Referee: I.Sadkovskyi (Ternopil Oblast)

=== Second preliminary round (1/32) ===
In this round, a club from the Premier League and a club from the First League entered the competition and joined the 16 winners of the First preliminary round (9 clubs from First League, 5 clubs from Second League, 2 – amateurs).

The draw was held on 5 August 2024 with participation of Dmytro Mykhailenko and Serhiy Annenko.

11 August 2024	Mykolaiv (AM)	3–1	(1L) Metalist Kharkiv	Mykolaiv, Lviv Oblast
16:00	Slavetskyi 56'; Dmukhovskyi 71'; Tsyupka 88'	Report; Report (LAF)	Horenko 29'; Dihtyar (yellow card) 32' (yellow-red card) 68'	Stadium: Miskyi; Attendance: 1,100; Referee: Vadym Zaprutnyak (Vinnytsia)

12 August 2024	Probiy Horodenka (2L)	2–2 (4–3 p)	(2L) Kulykiv	Horodenka, Ivano-Frankivsk Oblast
12:00	Orynchak 39'; Dmytruk 43'	Report	Nychyporenko 45+3' (pen.); Pylypchuk 67'	Stadium: Kolos; Attendance: 220; Referee: K.Kozoroh (Kyiv Oblast)
	Penalties
	Bilyi (penalty scored); Sondey (penalty scored); Ivanychuk (penalty scored); Rizhko (penalty scored)		Nychyporenko (penalty scored); Pylypchuk (penalty scored); Hros (penalty missed); Lebedenko (penalty scored); Bereza (penalty missed)

12 August 2024	Metalist 1925 Kharkiv (1L)	5–3 (a.e.t.)	(1L) Poltava	Kyiv
12:00	Owusu 31'; Imerekov 44'; Moura 68', 104'; Sten 117'	Report	Streltsov 66'; Plakhtyr 71'; Chervinskyi 83'	Stadium: imeni Bannikova; Attendance: 87; Referee: Ye.Tsybulko (Cherkasy Oblast)

12 August 2024	Chernihiv (2L)	0–1	(1L) Viktoriya Sumy	Chernihiv
12:00		Report	Yevpak 33'; Mashtalir (penalty missed) 58'	Stadium: Yunist Stadium; Referee: S.Podryhulya (Lutsk)

12 August 2024	Prykarpattia Ivano-Frankivsk (1L)	0–1	(1L) Bukovyna Chernivtsi	Ivano-Frankivsk
14:00		Report	Hirnyi 53'	Stadium: Rukh; Attendance: 437; Referee: M.Bohatyr (Zaporizhia)

12 August 2024	Podillia Khmelnytskyi (1L)	0–1	(1L) UCSA Tarasivka	Khmelnytskyi
15:00		Report	Debelko 31'	Stadium: Podillia; Attendance: 468; Referee: M.Lypko (Ivano-Frankivsk)

12 August 2024	Skala 1911 Stryi (2L)	1–3	(1L) Mynai	Morshyn, Lviv Oblast
16:00	Dmytruk 41' (o.g.)	Report	Prokopchuk 12'; Hunichev 48', 73'	Stadium: Medyk; Referee: I.Salash (Kalush)

13 August 2024	Kudrivka (1L)	3–2	(PL) Livyi Bereh Kyiv	Bucha, Kyiv Oblast
12:00	Potimkov 37'; Korkishko 77'; Storchous 86'	Report	Lytovchenko 60', 76'	Stadium: Yuvileinyi; Referee: O.Kohut (Ternopil)

13 August 2024	Olimpiya Savyntsi (AM)	4–2	(2L) Hirnyk-Sport Horishni Plavni	Horishni Plavni, Poltava Oblast
13:00	Koshman 16' (pen.), 68'; Pochernin 53'; Burlyai 73'	Report	Chukwuemeka 9'; Posyevkin 30'	Stadium: Yunist; Referee: V.Vasylchenko (Slovyansk)

=== Third preliminary round (1/16) ===
In this round, another 7 out of remaining 15 clubs from the Premier League entered the competition and joined the 9 winners of the Second preliminary round (6 clubs from First League, a club from Second League, 2 – amateurs).

The draw was held on 14 August 2024 with participation of Vyacheslav Shevchuk and Aliaksandr Khatskevich.

21 August 2024	Olimpiya Savyntsi (AM)	1–4	(PL) Zorya Luhansk	Horishni Plavni, Poltava Oblast
13:00	Kovtun 50'	Report	Ndour 27'; Slesar 28'; Horbach 56'; Yatsyk 90+1'	Stadium: Yunist; Referee: A.Zaitsev (Donetsk Oblast)

21 August 2024	Probiy Horodenka (2L)	2–2 (4–2 p)	(PL) Inhulets Petrove	Horodenka, Ivano-Frankivsk Oblast
15:00	Kharuk 22'; Orynchak 78'	Report	Pushkarov 63'; Vilivald 86'	Stadium: Kolos; Referee: S.Lapko (Lviv)
	Penalties
	Bilyi (penalty scored); Felipovych (penalty scored); Ivanychuk (penalty scored); Rizhko (penalty scored)		Mysyk (penalty missed); Volokhatyi (penalty scored); Pyatov (penalty scored); Kyslenko (penalty missed)

21 August 2024	Mynai (1L)	0–2	(1L) Viktoriya Sumy	Mynai, Zakarpattia Oblast
16:00		Report	Ulyanov 51'; Danylyuk 87'	Stadium: Mynai Arena; Attendance: 230; Referee: A.Mykhailyuk (Zhytomyr)

21 August 2024	Kolos Kovalivka (PL)	0–0 (4–5 p)	(PL) Obolon Kyiv	Kovalivka, Kyiv Oblast
17:00		Report		Stadium: Kolos; Attendance: 477; Referee: D.Reznikov (Kamianske)
	Penalties
	Bondarenko (penalty scored); Demchenko (penalty scored); Gagnidze (penalty missed); Salabay (penalty scored); Bezborodko (penalty scored); Kryvoruchko (penalty missed)		Dubko (penalty scored); Vitenchuk (penalty scored); Karas (penalty missed); Pryimak (penalty scored); Taranukha (penalty scored); Teslyuk (penalty scored)

21 August 2024	Mykolaiv (AM)	1–2	(1L) Bukovyna Chernivtsi	Mykolaiv, Lviv Oblast
17:00	Koval 58'; Hurskyi (red card) 69'	Report	Tyshchenko 71' (pen.); Boychuk 90+5'	Stadium: Miskyi; Attendance: 860; Referee: I.Stashuk (Chernihiv)

21 August 2024	Karpaty Lviv (PL)	3–0	(PL) Chornomorets Odesa	Lviv
18:00	Ocheretko 34'; Kuzyk 43'; Chachua 75'	Report		Stadium: Ukraina; Attendance: 1,930; Referee: N.Gyorgy (Uzhhorod)

22 August 2024	Kudrivka (1L)	0–4	(1L) UCSA Tarasivka	Bucha, Kyiv Oblast
13:00		Report	Goulart 29'; Fogo 58', 63'; Debelko 74'	Stadium: Yuvileinyi; Referee: M.Firsov (Rivne)

22 August 2024	Metalist 1925 Kharkiv (1L)	0–4	(PL) Veres Rivne	Hnidyn, Kyiv Oblast
17:00		Report	Campos 7'; Stepanyuk 10'; Hayduchyk 67'; Sharay 89'	Stadium: Livyi Bereh; Attendance: 320; Referee: S.Prychyna (Lviv Oblast)

=== Round of 16 (1/8) ===
In this round, the remaining 8 clubs from the Premier League entered the competition and joined the 8 winners of the Third preliminary round (4 clubs from Premier League, 3 clubs from First League, a club from Second League).

The draw was held on 28 August 2024 with participation of Vladyslav Vashchuk and Oleh Luzhnyi.

29 October 2024	Rukh Lviv (PL)	1–0	(PL) Karpaty Lviv	Lviv
18:00	Pidhurskyi 78'	Report		Stadium: Arena Lviv; Attendance: 3,000; Referee: Vitaliy Romanov

30 October 2024	Probiy Horodenka (2L)	0–1	(1L) Bukovyna Chernivtsi	Horodenka, Ivano-Frankivsk Oblast
12:00		Report	Boychuk 88'	Stadium: Probiy Arena; Attendance: 1,500; Referee: Artem Mykhailyuk

30 October 2024	UCSA Tarasivka (1L)	1–4	(PL) FC Oleksandriya	Kyiv
13:00	Debelko 49'	Report	Plaksa 8', 39'; Kozak 23'; Skorko 37'	Stadium: imeni Bannikova; Attendance: 270; Referee: Oleksandr Kalyonov

30 October 2024	Vorskla Poltava (PL)	1–2 (a.e.t.)	(PL) Dynamo Kyiv	Poltava
15:30	Iyede 26'	Report	Guerrero 31' (pen.); Vanat 100'	Stadium: Vorskla; Attendance: 2,358; Referee: Oleksandr Afanasyev

30 October 2024	Polissya Zhytomyr (PL)	2–1	(PL) Kryvbas Kryvyi Rih	Zhytomyr
15:30	Krushynskyi 44'; Hutsulyak 72'	Report	Zaderaka 17'	Stadium: Polissia Tsentralnyi Miskyi; Attendance: 950; Referee: Oleksandr Omelchenko

30 October 2024	Veres Rivne (PL)	2–1 (a.e.t.)	(PL) Obolon Kyiv	Rivne
18:00	Stepanyuk 58'; Luan 92'	Report	Slobodyan 54' (pen.); Lukyanchuk (yellow card) 29' (yellow-red card) 65'	Stadium: Avanhard; Attendance: 993; Referee: Oleksandr Solovyan

30 October 2024	Viktoriya Sumy (1L)	2–2 (a.e.t.) (3–1 p)	(PL) LNZ Cherkasy	Cherkasy
18:00	Nych 4'; Ryabyi 120+1'	Report	Momoh 48'; Thill 99'	Stadium: Cherkasy Arena; Attendance: 327; Referee: Nazariy Gyorgy
	Penalties
	Palamar (penalty scored); Novotryasov (penalty scored); Shpyryonok (penalty scored)		Thill (penalty missed); Jashari (penalty missed); Oliynyk (penalty scored); Nonikashvili (penalty missed)

30 October 2024	Shakhtar Donetsk (PL)	1–0	(PL) Zorya Luhansk	Lviv
18:00	Traoré 21'	Report	Eskinja (red card) 80'	Stadium: Arena Lviv; Attendance: 1,097; Referee: Denys Shurman

=== Quarter-finals (1/4) ===
This round includes 6 clubs from the Premier League and two teams from the First League.

The draw was held on 8 November 2024 with participation of Oleh Luzhny among notable football celebrities.

1 April 2025	Bukovyna Chernivtsi (1L)	2–1	(1L) Viktoriya Sumy	Chernivtsi
13:00	Tyshchenko 4'; Shynkarenko 59' (o.g.); Bezuhlyi 84'	Report		Stadium: Bukovyna; Attendance: 4,500; Referee: Dmytro Panchyshyn (Kharkiv)

2 April 2025	FC Oleksandriya (PL)	0–1 (a.e.t.)	(PL) Shakhtar Donetsk	Oleksandriya, Kirovohrad Oblast
14:00		Report	Kevin 109'	Stadium: Nika; Attendance: 1,180; Referee: Mykola Balakin (Kyiv Oblast)

2 April 2025	Rukh Lviv (PL)	0–1	(PL) Dynamo Kyiv	Lviv
18:00		Report	Pikhalyonok 43'	Stadium: Arena Lviv; Attendance: 1,350; Referee: Vitaliy Romanov (Dnipro)

2 April 2025	Veres Rivne (PL)	0–1 (a.e.t.)	(PL) Polissya Zhytomyr	Rivne
18:00		Report	Batista 93'	Stadium: Avanhard; Attendance: 2,960; Referee: Oleksiy Derevinskyi (Khmelnytskyi)

=== Semi-finals (1/2) ===
This round will include three clubs from the Premier League and a team from the First League.

23 April 2025	Bukovyna Chernivtsi (1L)	1–4	(PL) Dynamo Kyiv	Lviv
16:00	Boychuk 23'	Report	Voloshyn 56'; Popov 63'; Brazhko 72' (pen.); Shaparenko 76'	Stadium: Ukraina; Attendance: 3,200; Referee: Maksym Kozyryatskyi (Zaporizhzhia)

23 April 2025	Polissya Zhytomyr (PL)	0–1 (a.e.t.)	(PL) Shakhtar Donetsk	Zhytomyr
18:00		Report	Alisson 114'	Stadium: Tsentralnyi; Attendance: 4,550; Referee: Dmytro Panchyshyn (Kharkiv)

=== Final ===
14 May 2025	Shakhtar Donetsk (PL)	1–1 (a.e.t.) (6–5 p)	(PL) Dynamo Kyiv	Zhytomyr
	Kauã 64'	Report	Yarmolenko 43'	Stadium: Tsentralnyi; Attendance: 4,740; Referee: M. Balakin (Kyiv Oblast)
	Penalties
	Nazaryna (penalty scored); Alisson (penalty scored); Kevin (penalty scored); Kauã (penalty scored); Ghram (penalty scored); Kryskiv (penalty scored)		(penalty scored) Vanat; (penalty scored) Brazhko; (penalty scored) Vivcharenko; (penalty scored) Mykhailenko; (penalty scored) Pikhalyonok; (penalty missed) Karavayev

== Top goalscorers ==
The competition's top three goalscorers including preliminary rounds.

As of 23 April 2025

Rank	Scorer	Team	Goals (Pen.)
1	(Ukraine) Bohdan Orynchak	Probiy Horodenka	4
2	(Ukraine) Bohdan Boychuk	Bukovyna Chernivtsi	3
2	(Ukraine) Roman Debelko	UCSA Tarasivka	3
2	(Brazil) Ari Moura	Metalist 1925 Kharkiv	3
2	(Ukraine) Ihor Koshman	Olimpiya Savyntsi	3 (1)

== See also ==
- 2024–25 Ukrainian Premier League
- 2024–25 Ukrainian First League
- 2024–25 Ukrainian Second League
- 2024–25 Ukrainian Amateur Cup
