= 2024–25 Ukrainian First League =

Ukrainian First League
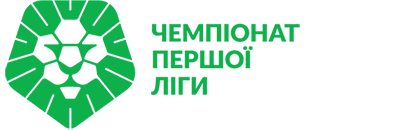
- Season: 2024–25
- Dates: 7 August 2024 – 23 November 2024 (first stage); 29 March 2025 – 30 May 2025 (second stage); June 2025 (play-offs)
- Champions: Epitsentr
- Promoted: Epitsentr; Kudrivka; Metalist 1925; Poltava
- Relegated: Dinaz; Khust (withdrew); Kremin (withdrew); Mynai (withdrew)
- Matches: 146
- Goals: 338 (2.32 per match)
- Top goalscorer: Danylo Kravchuk (Epitsentr) (9 goals)
- Biggest home win: 5–0 (UCSA – Kremin, Round 6)
- Biggest away win: 0–4 (Mariupol – Viktoriya, Round 6)
- Highest scoring: 5–2 (Epitsentr – Khust, Round 3); 4–3 (Epitsentr – UCSA, Round 1P); 3–4 (UCSA – Kudrivka, Round 10)
- Highest attendance: 1,931 (Bukovyna – Mynai, Round 9)
- Lowest attendance: 0 (64 matches)
- Total attendance: 41,803
- Average attendance: 510
- All statistics correct as of 12 April 2015.

The 2024–25 Ukrainian First League was the 34th football league season since its establishment. The league competition consisted of 18 teams. The competition took place during the ongoing war with the Russia since late February 2022.

The season started with an opening match of the season on 7 August 2024 between Ahrobiznes and Metalist in Volochysk. Most of the other Round 1 matches were played in the following day, 8 August 2024.

== Format ==
The PFL has decided to keep the split group format of double round-robin tournaments with 9 teams in group, total 18 teams. The number of teams has been reduced to 18 compared to the 20 last season. Similar to the last season the top teams will qualify for the promotion tournament, four from each, while less fortunate teams, five from each, will qualify for the relegation tournament. Due to odd number of teams in both groups of the first stage, the second stage groups, promotion and relegation, will not have even number of teams. In total the first stage will have 18 rounds with 72 matches in each group, 16 for each team.

The second stage will have another two groups one for promotion to the top tier, another for relegation to the tier below. The promotion group tournament will consist of 8 teams, top 4 teams from each group (A and B) of the first stage. The teams' record from the previous stage will be grandfathered in full. Each team in the promotion group will play 8 matches with the best four teams of the other group of the first stage (home and away). In total there will be 32 matches. The top two teams of the promotion group will get promotion rights to the Ukrainian Premier League, while the next two teams (3rd and 4th places) would receive a chance to get promotion rights through play-off match-up with the top tier teams.

The teams that would place 5th through 9th in each group (A and B) in the first stage will form the relegation group. The teams' record from the previous stage will be grandfathered in full as well. Each 10 teams of the relegation group will play 10 matches with the 5 teams of the other group of the first stage (home and away). In total there will be 50 matches. The bottom three teams (places 8-10) will gain direct relegation to the tier below (Druha Liha/Ukrainian Second League), while teams that would place 6th and 7th will meet with runners-up of the Druha Liha in play-off match-ups to contest their place in the league.

=== Emergency changes ===
Following the withdrawal of FC Khust in September 2024, the Professional Football League adopted following decisions:

- If a First League team is withdrawn and has not played fifty percent of the matches in the first stage of the First League competition, then the points scored in the first stage of the competition with that team will be annulled (scratched).
- After completing the first stage, this team automatically takes the last place in the respective group, and after completing the second stage, it automatically takes the last place in the Relegation group.
- If a team is withdrawn from group A, then the points scored in group B with the team with the lowest place in the tournament table of this group are annulled, for the teams of the corresponding group, in the second stage of the competition (for the teams of the Championship group) and remain (counted) (for teams of the Elimination group), a similar approach is used when removing a team from group B.

== Teams ==
This season, Ukrainian First League consisted of 18 teams.

=== Promoted teams ===
Two teams were promoted at the end of the 2023–24 Ukrainian Second League.

- UCSA Tarasivka – playoff winner (debut)
- FC Kudrivka – placed 7th (debut, replacing "Kudrivka-Nyva")

=== Relegated teams ===
Two teams were relegated at the end of the 2023–24 Ukrainian Premier League.

- Metalist 1925 Kharkiv – 16th placed (returning after three seasons)
- FC Mynai – 15th placed (returning after four seasons)

=== Administrative issues ===
==== Temporary relocation ====
Due to the Russian military aggression, three clubs in the league were forced to relocate.

- FC Metalist Kharkiv moved to Uzhhorod
- FSC Mariupol moved to Boryspil
- FC Metalist 1925 Kharkiv moved to Zolocha community (Kyiv suburb)

==== Withdrawn ====
- FC Kudrivka which has its teams in both Chernihiv and Kyiv regions (representing Irpin) merged and took over Nyva Buzova (Irpin city area). The club withdrew its original team from the lower tier for this season.
- Due to withdrawal of the Ukrainian Second League (tier 3) champion Druzhba Myrivka, FC Khust, which was defeated in play-off match-up against PFC Zviahel, was allowed to remain in the Persha Liha (tier 2) competitions.
- On 21 June 2024, it was announced that Podoliany Ternopil (2023–24 AAFU debutants) are planned to merge with FC Khust as FC Khust-Podoliany. The merging was not done.
- FSC Mariupol, after missing 2 calendar matches in the first half of the season, allowed to stay in the league despite regulations. On March 10, 2025, the head coach of the club announced that an official letter that the club withdraws from competitions will be sent the next day on March 11. About a week later, in internet news media appeared information about that an amateur club, Feniks Pidmonastyr (2024–25 amateurs), has agreed and was approved to play under FSC Mariupol brand. On March 19, it was announced that Feniks is ready to pay the Mariupol's debt of 5 million hryvnia. Next day it was confirmed that the "replacement" will go into effect and in the second half of March will take part in a traditional local Juzst Memorial tournament. On 24 March 2025, the general director of Feniks explained that until the end of the season the club will be playing as Feniks-Mariupol.
- PFC Zviahel – promoted as a playoff winner to debut, but withdrawn before the season started
- Kudrivka-Nyva – partially merged during the last season's winter break, the club completed merger
- Druzhba Myrivka – winner of the 2023–24 Ukrainian Second League withdrawn from competitions
- FC Khust – after playing only three matches, the club announced that it withdraws from the league. On the moment of its announcement, it lost all its 3 matches and was placing the last 9th position.

=== Location map ===
The following displays the location of teams.

Home venues of teams in the 2024–25 Ukrainian First League. Teams of FSC Mariupol, Metalist Kharkiv, Metalist 1925 Kharkiv, and Viktoriya Sumy were forced to play away from home.
— Group A — Group B

== Stadiums ==
The following stadiums were used as home grounds for the teams in the competition.

Rank	Stadium	Location	Capacity	Club	Notes
1	Dynamo imeni Lobanovskoho	Kyiv	16,873	Metalist 1925 Kharkiv	used as home ground in 1 match
2	Miskyi imeni Shukhevycha	Ternopil	15,150	Nyva Ternopil	
3	Bukovyna	Chernivtsi	12,000	Bukovyna Chernivtsi	
4	Slavutych-Arena	Zaporizhzhia	11,883	Metalurh Zaporizhzhia	
5	Avanhard	Uzhhorod	10,383	Metalist Kharkiv	used as home ground during the season (Note: Due to the Russian invasion of Ukraine (2022).)
6	Cherkasy Arena	Cherkasy	10,321	Viktoriya Sumy	used as home ground in 3 match
7	Podillia	Khmelnytskyi	6,800	Podillia Khmelnytskyi	
8	Rukh	Ivano-Frankivsk	6,500	Prykarpattia Ivano-Frankivsk	
9	Kolos	Boryspil, Kyiv Oblast	5,654	FSC Mariupol	used as home ground during the first half of the season
9	Kolos	Boryspil, Kyiv Oblast	5,654	Viktoriya Sumy	used as home ground in 4 matches
10	Karpaty	Khust, Zakarpattia Oblast	5,200	FC Khust	
11	Arena Livyi Bereh	Zolocha hromada, Kyiv Oblast	4,700	Metalist 1925 Kharkiv	used as home ground during the season
12	Skif Stadium	Lviv	3,742	Feniks-Mariupol	used as home ground during the second half of the season
13	Yunist Stadium	Volochysk, Khmelnytskyi Oblast	2,700	Ahrobiznes Volochysk	
14	imeni Tonkocheyeva	Kamianets-Podilskyi, Khmelnytskyi Oblast	2,587	Epitsentr Kamianets-Podilskyi	
15	Yunist Stadium	Horishni Plavni, Poltava Oblast	2,500	Kremin Kremenchuk	used as home ground during the season (Note: FC Kremin is barred from playing at its home stadium (Kremin-Arena) due to its turf issues.)
15	Yunist Stadium	Horishni Plavni, Poltava Oblast	2,500	SC Poltava	used as home ground in 1 match
16	imeni Bannikova	Kyiv	1,678	UCSA Tarasivka	
16	imeni Bannikova	Kyiv	1,678	Viktoriya Sumy	used as home ground in 2 matches
17	Mynai Arena	Mynai, Zakarpattia Oblast	1,312	FC Mynai	
18	Mashynobudivnyk	Karlivka, Poltava Oblast	1,300	Kremin Kremenchuk	used as home ground in 1 match
19	Stadium Yuvileinyi	Bucha, Kyiv Oblast	1,028	FC Kudrivka	used as home ground in 8 matches
20	Molodizhnyi	Poltava	680	SC Poltava	
21	Dinaz	Demydiv, Kyiv Oblast	500	Dinaz Vyshhorod	
21	Dinaz	Demydiv, Kyiv Oblast	500	Kremin Kremenchuk	used as home ground in 1 match
21	Dinaz	Demydiv, Kyiv Oblast	500	Viktoriya Sumy	used as home ground in 1 match
22	Kudrivka Arena	Kudrivka, Chernihiv Oblast	500	FC Kudrivka	used as home ground in 3 matches
23	FC LNZ training base	Heronymivka, Cherkasy Oblast	300	Viktoriya Sumy	used as home ground in 2 matches

== Personnel and sponsorship ==
Team	President	Head coach	Captain	Kit manufacturer	Shirt sponsor
Ahrobiznes Volochysk	Oleh Sobutskyi	Oleksandr Chyzhevskyi	Roman Bilyi	Nike	Ahrobiznes
Bukovyna Chernivtsi	Andriy Safronyak	Hryhoriy Churilov (caretaker)	Vitaliy Koltsov	Nike	Dmart
Dinaz Vyshhorod	Yaroslav Moskalenko	Oleksandr Holovko	Andriy Voloshyn	Nike	Цар Хліб
Epitsentr Kamianets-Podilskyi	Ivan Chernonoh	Serhiy Nahornyak	Andriy Bezhenar	Macron	Епіцентр
Khust	Mykhaylo Madyarchyk	Volodymyr Tsytkin	Bohdan Pavlych	Joma	—
Kremin Kremenchuk	Serhii Kovnir	(vacant)	Oleksandr Dykhtiaruk	SWIFT	TERMINAL-MK
Kudrivka	Roman Solodarenko	Vasyl Baranov	Anton Yashkov	Nike	—
Feniks-Mariupol	Oleksandr Yaroshenko Yuriy Pavlyshyn	Maksym Feshchuk	Andriy Bohdanov	Joma	Kyrrex
Metalist Kharkiv	Oleksandr Yaroslavskyi	Andriy Anishchenko	Vladyslav Rybak	Joma	—
Metalist 1925 Kharkiv	Volodymyr Nosov	Oleksandr Chyzhov (caretaker)	Maksym Imerekov	Puma	WhiteBIT
Metalurh Zaporizhzhia	Maksym Lupashko	Coaching crew	Dmytro Krapyvnyi	Legea	Weltum
Mynai	Valeriy Peresolyak	Yevhen Kalynychenko	Oleh Vyshnevskyi	Kelme	FavBet
Nyva Ternopil	Oleksandr Stadnyk	Yuriy Virt	Arsen Slotyuk	Kelme	—
Podillya Khmelnytskyi	Yevhen Beiderman	Serhiy Kovalets	Oleksandr Tsybulnyk	Kelme	Kolvi
Poltava	Serhiy Ivashchenko	Volodymyr Sysenko (Note: While Sysenko was sick and staying the official SC Poltava manager, at least since 19 May 2025, his duties were temporarily performed by Ihor Tymchenko until Sysenko recovered from his illness.)	Vladyslav Danylenko	Joma	КВП
Prykarpattia Ivano-Frankivsk	Vasyl Olshanetskyi	Oleh Rypan	Vasyl Tsyutsyura	Joma	—
UCSA Tarasivka	Serhiy Lesnyk	Ivan Ostapov (caretaker)	Anton Yevdokymov	Kelme	—
Viktoriya Sumy	Serhiy Bondarenko	Anatoliy Bezsmertnyi	Dmytro Ulyanov	Puma	—

=== Managerial changes ===
Team	Outgoing head coach	Manner of departure	Date of vacancy	Table	Incoming head coach	Date of appointment
Nyva Ternopil	Oleksandr Stakhiv	Mutual agreement	10 June 2024	Pre-season	Yevhen Kalynychenko	19 June 2024
Metalurh Zaporizhzhia	Anton Hay (caretaker)	End of interim	23 June 2024	Pre-season	Volodymyr Shapovalov	23 June 2024
Dinaz Vyshhorod	Oleksandr Holovko	Change of role	16 July 2024	Pre-season	Oleksandr Ryabokon	16 July 2024
UCSA Tarasivka	Mykola Tsymbal	Sacked	23 July 2024	Pre-season	Dmytro Chyrykal	23 July 2024
Metalist 1925 Kharkiv	Viktor Skrypnyk	Resigned	26 July 2024	Pre-season	Serhiy Karpenko (interim)	28 July 2024
Metalist 1925 Kharkiv	Serhiy Karpenko (interim)	End of interim spell	20 August 2024	7th (group B)	(Netherlands) Patrick van Leeuwen	20 August 2024
Kudrivka	Roman Loktionov	Sacked	4 September 2024	4th (group B)	Vasyl Baranov (interim)	4 September 2024
Nyva Ternopil	Yevhen Kalynychenko	Sacked	13 September 2024	4th (group A)	Ruslan Umanets (interim)	13 September 2024
Nyva Ternopil	Ruslan Umanets (interim)	End of interim	16 September 2024	6th (group A)	Yuriy Virt	16 September 2024
Metalurh Zaporizhzhia	Volodymyr Shapovalov	Sacked	30 September 2024	8th (group B)	Illya Blyznyuk	1 October 2024
Podillya Khmelnytskyi	Vitaliy Kostyshyn	Resigned	19 October 2024	7th (group A)	Oleksandr Zhdanov (caretaker)	22 October 2024
Bukovyna Chernivtsi	Valeriy Kryventsov	Suspended	22 October 2024	3rd (group A)	Hryhoriy Churilov (caretaker)	22 October 2024
Podillia Khmelnytskyi	Oleksandr Zhdanov (caretaker)	Continued the caretaker spell in tandem	27 October 2024	7th (group A)	Coaching tandem (Note: Oleksandr Zhdanov & Andriy Fedorenko (caretakers))	27 October 2024
Podillia Khmelnytskyi	Coaching tandem (Note: Oleksandr Zhdanov & Andriy Fedorenko (caretakers))	End of caretaker period	29 October 2024	7th (group A)	Serhiy Kovalets	29 October 2024 (Note: Serhiy Kovalets started his work since 1 November 2024.)
Bukovyna Chernivtsi	Valeriy Kryventsov	Mutual consent after suspended in October	30 November 2024	4th (group A)	Hryhoriy Churilov (caretaker)	22 October 2024 (Note: Hryhoriy Churilov still have a caretaker spell after suspended and sacked of the previous coach)
Kudrivka	Vasyl Baranov (interim)	Change of role	17 December 2024	1st (group B)	Vasyl Baranov	17 December 2024
Mynai	(Serbia) Željko Ljubenović	Mutual consent	21 January 2025	13th (relegation group)	Yevhen Kalynychenko	1 February 2025
Dinaz Vyshhorod	Oleksandr Ryabokon	Mutual consent Signed with FC Lisne	27 February 2025	15th (relegation group)	Oleksandr Holovko	28 February 2025
Mariupol	Oleh Krasnoperov	Club's reorganization Signed with Dnister Zalishchyky	March 2025	10th (relegation group)	Maksym Feshchuk	20 March 2025
UCSA Tarasivka	Dmytro Chyrykal	Mutual consent	24 April 2025	6th (promotion group)	Ivan Ostapov (caretaker)	24 April 2025
Metalurh Zaporizhzhia	Illya Blyznyuk	Mutual consent	28 April 2025	14th (relegation group)	Coaching crew (Note: Yuriy Slabyshev, Serhiy Rudyka, and Ruslan Halihuzov (caretakers))	28 April 2025
Metalist 1925 Kharkiv	(Netherlands) Patrick van Leeuwen	Suspended	18 May 2025	4th (promotion group)	Oleksandr Chyzhov (caretaker)	19 May 2025
Kremin Kremenchuk	Ihor Klymovskyi	End of contract	27 May 2025	17th (relegation group)	TBA	

== Group A league table ==
Pos	Team	Pld	W	D	L	GF	GA	GD	Pts	Promotion, qualification or relegation
1	Epitsentr Kamianets-Podilskyi	14	8	5	1	21	7	+14	29	Qualified to the Promotion group
2	Ahrobiznes Volochysk	14	9	1	4	16	13	+3	28	Qualified to the Promotion group
3	Metalist Kharkiv	14	6	4	4	20	11	+9	22	Qualified to the Promotion group
4	Bukovyna Chernivtsi	14	5	5	4	11	11	0	20	Qualified to the Promotion group
5	Nyva Ternopil	14	4	4	6	13	17	−4	16 (Note: Head-to-head points: Nyva 4, Mynai 1)	Qualified to the Relegation group
6	Mynai	14	4	4	6	12	20	−8	16	Qualified to the Relegation group
7	Prykarpattia Ivano-Frankivsk	14	3	4	7	14	18	−4	13	Qualified to the Relegation group
8	Podillia Khmelnytskyi	14	1	5	8	9	19	−10	8	Qualified to the Relegation group
-	Khust	0	0	0	0	0	0	0	0	Withdrawn and record annulled

Updated to match(es) played on 23 November 2024. Source: PFL.ua
Rules for classification: 1) Points; 2) Head-to-head points; 3) Head-to-head goal difference; 4) Head-to-head goals scored; 5) Goal difference in all games; 6) Goals scored in all games (Note: calculation by criteria indicated in rules 2, 3, 4 is conducted with consideration of all teams that have an equal number of tournament points at the moment of calculation and not only among those which after preliminary criteria have appeared more successful).

=== Group A results ===
Home \ Away	AHR	BUK	EPC	XST	MET	MIN	NYV	POD	PRY
Ahrobiznes Volochysk		1–0	2–1		2–1	2–1	0–1	1–0	0–1
Bukovyna Chernivtsi	0–1		1–1		2–1	2–1	1–0	1–1	0–0
Epitsentr Kamianets-Podilskyi	2–0	2–0		5–2	1–1	4–0	1–1	2–1	3–0
FC Khust							2–3		
Metalist Kharkiv	0–1	0–1	0–0			3–0	2–0	1–1	2–1
FC Mynai	3–1	1–0	0–0		0–3		0–2	0–0	4–2
Nyva Ternopil	2–3	1–1	0–1		1–1	1–1		2–1	2–1
Podillya Khmelnytskyi	1–1	0–1	1–2	1–0	0–3	0–1	1–0		2–2
Prykarpattia Ivano-Frankivsk	0–1	1–1	0–1		1–2	0–0	3–0	2–0	

Updated to match(es) played on 23 November 2024. Source: Calendar (in Ukrainian)
Legend: Blue = home team win; Yellow = draw; Red = away team win.

=== Group A results by week ===
Team ╲ Round	1	2	3	4	5	6	7	8	9	10	11	12	13	14
Ahrobiznes Volochysk	W	W	W	W	W	W	W	W	W	L	L	D	L	L
Bukovyna Chernivtsi	D	L	W	W	L	W	W	D	L	D	D	D	W	L
Epitsentr Kamianets-Podilskyi	W	D	W	D	W	L	W	D	D	D	W	W	W	W
Khust	L	L	L	—	—	—	—	—	—	—	—	—	—	—
Metalist Kharkiv	L	D	D	D	L	W	W	L	W	W	D	L	W	W
Mynai	W	L	D	L	D	L	L	D	W	W	D	L	L	W
Nyva Ternopil	L	D	L	W	L	L	L	D	L	D	D	W	W	W
Podillia Khmelnytskyi	D	L	D	D	L	W	L	L	D	L	L	D	L	L
Prykarpattia Ivano-Frankivsk	D	L	L	D	W	L	L	D	D	W	W	L	L	L

Updated to match(es) played on 23 November 2024. Source: pfl.ua
W = Win; D = Draw; L = Loss

=== Group A goalscorers ===
As of 23 November 2024

Rank	Scorer	Team	Goals (Pen.)
1	Danylo Kravchuk	Epitsentr Kamianets-Podilskyi	9 (0)
2	Andriy Riznyk	Nyva Ternopil	7 (0)
3	Artur Remenyak	FC Mynai	5 (0)
3	Dmytro Haladey	Nyva Ternopil	5 (1)
3	Vasyl Tsyutsyura	Prykarpattia Ivano-Frankivsk	5 (2)
6	2 player(s)		4
8	8 player(s)		3
16	10 player(s)		2
26	39 player(s)		1

=== Group A clean sheets ===
As of 23 November 2024

Rank	Player	Club	Clean sheets
1	Oleh Bilyk	Epitsentr Kamianets-Podilskyi	8
2	Roman Pidkivka	Ahrobiznes Volochysk	5
2	Vladyslav Rybak	Metalist Kharkiv	5
4	2 player(s)		4
6	1 player(s)		3
7	2 player(s)		2
9	3 player(s)		1

== Group B league table ==
Pos	Team	Pld	W	D	L	GF	GA	GD	Pts	Promotion, qualification or relegation
1	Kudrivka	16	9	4	3	22	12	+10	31	Qualified to the Promotion group
2	Metalist 1925 Kharkiv	16	8	5	3	21	10	+11	29	Qualified to the Promotion group
3	Poltava	16	8	5	3	24	14	+10	29	Qualified to the Promotion group
4	UCSA Tarasivka	16	8	4	4	31	21	+10	28	Qualified to the Promotion group
5	Viktoriya Sumy	16	6	5	5	23	12	+11	23	Qualified to the Relegation group
6	Mariupol	16	5	3	8	17	23	−6	18	Qualified to the Relegation group
7	Metalurh Zaporizhzhia	16	4	5	7	15	22	−7	17	Qualified to the Relegation group
8	Dinaz Vyshhorod	16	3	4	9	12	28	−16	13	Qualified to the Relegation group
9	Kremin Kremenchuk	16	2	3	11	9	32	−23	9	Qualified to the Relegation group

Source: PFL.ua
Rules for classification: 1) Points; 2) Head-to-head points; 3) Head-to-head goal difference; 4) Head-to-head goals scored; 5) Goal difference in all games; 6) Goals scored in all games (Note: calculation by criteria indicated in rules 2, 3, 4 is conducted with consideration of all teams that have an equal number of tournament points at the moment of calculation and not only among those which after preliminary criteria have appeared more successful).

=== Group B results ===
Home \ Away	DIN	KRE	KDR	MAR	M25	MET	POL	UCS	VKT
Dinaz Vyshhorod		0–1	0–1	1–4	0–2	2–0	3–1	0–2	1–1 (Note: The game scheduled to be played on 7 August 2024 on Viktoriya's ground was postponed to later due to air raid siren. The game was rescheduled and took place on 24 September 2024 on Dinaz's ground instead whilst Matchday 10 match was rescheduled to take place on Viktoriya's ground.)
Kremin Kremenchuk	0–3		0–3	3–0 (Note: On 27 November 2024 the postponed game between FC Kremin and FSC Mariupol was canceled due to financial hardship of the Mariupol team. The decision for the game result was determied by the UAF Control and Disciplinary Committee on 3 December 2024.)	1–1	0–1 (Note: The game scheduled to be played on 3 October 2024 was postponed to later due to air raid siren. The game was rescheduled and took place on 30 October 2024.)	0–0	0–1	0–3
FC Kudrivka	0–0	2–1		1–0	1–1	3–0	0–0	0–1	0–2
FSC Mariupol	3–0	3–0 (Note: The match that originally ended 2–1 was changed to technical result due to an ineligible player for Kremin.)	0–0		1–0	1–1	1–2	2–3	0–4
Metalist 1925 Kharkiv	2–2	4–0	0–2	1–1		2–0	0–1	2–0	2–0
Metalurh Zaporizhzhia	3–0 (Note: On 22 November 2024, the PFL announced that it was informed by FC Dinaz that the club cannot make it to the game Metalurh-Dinaz scheduled on 24 November 2024. On 25 November 2024, the president of PFL commented that FC Dinaz will be awarded with a technical loss for no show. On 28 November 2024, the UAF Control and Disciplinary Committee determined the technical result of the match which reflected the previous comment of the PFL president.)	1–0	1–3	1–0	1–2		0–0	1–2	1–3
SC Poltava	3–0	4–2	1–2	3–0	0–1	2–2		1–1	1–0
UCSA Tarasivka	5–0	5–0	3–4	3–0 (Note: On 14 October 2024 the Mariupol players refused to appear on the field due to unpaid wages by the club. Mariupol was awarded technical loss for forfeit on decision of the UAF Control and Disciplinary Commission of 24 October 2024.)	0–0	2–2	1–3		1–1
Viktoriya Sumy	0–0	1–1 (Note: The game scheduled to be played on 26 August 2024 was postponed to later due to air raid siren. The game was rescheduled and took place on 13 November 2024.)	2–0	0–1	0–1	0–0	1–2	5–1	

Updated to match(es) played on 27 November 2024. Source: Calendar (in Ukrainian)
Legend: Blue = home team win; Yellow = draw; Red = away team win.

=== Group B results by week ===
Team ╲ Round	1	2	3	4	5	6	7	8	9	10	11	12	13	14	15	16
Dinaz Vyshhorod	D	L	L	D	L	L	D	W	D	L	W	L	L	L	W	L
Kremin Kremenchuk	L	D	L	L	L	W	L	L	L	L	L	L	D	D	L	W
Kudrivka	L	D	W	L	W	D	D	D	W	W	W	L	W	W	W	W
Mariupol	W	L	W	D	L	D	L	W	D	L	W	L	W	L	L	L
Metalist 1925 Kharkiv	L	D	D	D	W	W	D	L	D	W	W	W	W	W	L	W
Metalurh Zaporizhzhia	W	L	L	D	D	L	L	L	D	L	D	W	W	L	D	W
Poltava	W	W	D	W	D	W	W	W	D	L	D	W	L	D	W	L
UCSA Tarasivka	W	L	W	D	W	W	W	D	L	D	W	L	W	W	D	L
Viktoriya Sumy	W	W	L	W	L	D	D	D	D	W	W	L	L	L	D	W

Source: pfl.ua
W = Win; D = Draw; L = Loss

=== Group B goalscorers ===
As of 25 November 2024

Rank	Scorer	Team	Goals (Pen.)
1	(Brazil) Ari Moura	Metalist 1925 Kharkiv	8 (1)
2	(Brazil) Vavá Guerreiro	UCSA Tarasivka	6 (2)
2	Ruslan Palamar	Viktoriya Sumy	6 (5)
4	(Paraguay) Pablo Castro	UCSA Tarasivka	5 (0)
4	Andriy Storchous	FC Kudrivka	5 (0)
4	Maksym Yevpak	Viktoriya Sumy	5 (0)
4	Illya Zubkov	FSC Mariupol	5 (1)
4	Dmytro Shcherbak	SC Poltava	5 (3)
9	2 player(s)		4
11	8 player(s)		3
19	19 player(s)		2
38	45 player(s)		1

=== Group B clean sheets ===
As of 25 November 2024

Rank	Player	Club	Clean sheets
1	Danylo Varakuta	Metalist 1925 Kharkiv	7
1	Anton Yashkov	FC Kudrivka	7
3	Nikita Fedotov	UCSA Tarasivka	6
3	Oleksandr Lytvynenko	Viktoriya Sumy	6
3	(Armenia) Valeriy Voskonyan	SC Poltava	6
6	2 player(s)		3
8	3 player(s)		2
11	4 player(s)		1

== Promotion group league table ==
Pos	Team	Pld	W	D	L	GF	GA	GD	Pts	Promotion, qualification or relegation
1	Epitsentr Kamianets-Podilskyi (C, P)	22	16	5	1	39	15	+24	53	Promotion to Ukrainian Premier League
2	Poltava (P)	22	12	5	5	31	19	+12	41	Promotion to Ukrainian Premier League
3	Metalist 1925 Kharkiv (O, P)	22	10	6	6	29	20	+9	36	Qualification to promotion play-offs
4	Kudrivka (O, P)	22	10	5	7	25	18	+7	35	Qualification to promotion play-offs
5	Ahrobiznes Volochysk	22	10	3	9	19	26	−7	33	
6	Metalist Kharkiv	22	8	7	7	29	21	+8	31	
7	Bukovyna Chernivtsi	22	8	6	8	20	20	0	30	
8	UCSA Tarasivka	22	7	6	9	33	35	−2	27	

Source: PFL.ua
Rules for classification: 1) Points; 2) Head-to-head points; 3) Head-to-head goal difference; 4) Head-to-head goals scored; 5) Goal difference in all games; 6) Goals scored in all games (Note: calculation by criteria indicated in rules 2, 3, 4 is conducted with consideration of all teams that have an equal number of tournament points at the moment of calculation and not only among those which after preliminary criteria have appeared more successful).
(C) Champions; (O) Play-off winners; (P) Promoted

=== Promotion group results ===
Home \ Away	AHR	BUK	EPC	KDR	MET	M25	POL	UCS
Ahrobiznes Volochysk				0–2		1–1	1–2	1–0
Bukovyna Chernivtsi				1–0		1–2	1–1	2–0
Epitsentr Kamianets-Podilskyi				2–1		2–1	2–0	4–3
Kudrivka	2–0	2–0	0–1		1–1			
Metalist Kharkiv				2–0		1–0	0–1	0–2
Metalist 1925 Kharkiv	4–0	2–1	1–3		2–2			
Poltava	2–0	2–0	2–3		1–0			
UCSA Tarasivka	0–0	0–3	0–1		3–3			

Source: Calendar (in Ukrainian)
Legend: Blue = home team win; Yellow = draw; Red = away team win.

=== Promotion group results by week ===
Team ╲ Round	1	2	3	4	5	6	7	8
Ahrobiznes Volochysk	L	D	L	L	L	W	L	D
Bukovyna Chernivtsi	W	L	D	W	L	L	L	W
Epitsentr Kamianets-Podilskyi	W	W	W	W	W	W	W	W
Kudrivka	L	D	W	L	W	L	W	L
Metalist Kharkiv	W	D	L	L	D	W	D	L
Metalist 1925 Kharkiv	L	W	L	W	D	W	L	D
Poltava	W	L	D	W	W	L	W	W
UCSA Tarasivka	L	D	W	L	L	L	D	L

Source: pfl.ua
W = Win; D = Draw; L = Loss

=== Promotion group goalscorers ===
As of 24 May 2025

Rank	Scorer	Team	Goals (Pen.)
1	Danylo Kravchuk	Epitsentr Kamianets-Podilskyi	13 (2)
2	(Brazil) Ari Moura	Metalist 1925 Kharkiv	11 (2)
3	Vladlen Yurchenko	Metalist 1925 Kharkiv	9 (1)
4	Ivan Bendera	Epitsentr Kamianets-Podilskyi	8 (0)
5	Artem Liehostayev	FC Kudrivka	6 (0)
5	Yevhen Misyura	SC Poltava	6 (0)
5	Mykyta Sytnykov	UCSA Tarasivka	6 (0)
5	(Brazil) Vavá Guerreiro	UCSA Tarasivka	6 (2)
5	Maksym Voytikhovskyi	Ahrobiznes Volochysk	6 (2)
5	Dmytro Shcherbak	SC Poltava	6 (3)
11	4 player(s)		5
15	5 player(s)		4
20	17 player(s)		3
37	16 player(s)		2
53	40 player(s)		1

=== Promotion group clean sheets ===
As of 24 May 2025

Rank	Player	Club	Clean sheets
1	Oleh Bilyk	Epitsentr Kamianets-Podilskyi	11
2	(Armenia) Valeriy Voskonyan	SC Poltava	10
3	Anton Yashkov	FC Kudrivka	9
4	Danylo Varakuta	Metalist 1925 Kharkiv	8
5	2 player(s)		7
7	1 player(s)		6
8	1 player(s)		5
9	1 player(s)		2
10	5 player(s)		1

== Relegation group league table ==
Pos	Team	Pld	W	D	L	GF	GA	GD	Pts	Promotion, qualification or relegation
9	Viktoriya Sumy	24	9	9	6	32	17	+15	36	
10	Prykarpattia Ivano-Frankivsk	24	8	8	8	32	28	+4	32 (Note: Head-to-head goal difference: Prykarpattia +2, Nyva -2)	
11	Nyva Ternopil	24	8	8	8	28	27	+1	32	
12	Mynai	24	8	6	10	26	30	−4	30	Withdrawn after the season
13	Feniks-Mariupol (Note: The UAF Control and Disciplinary Committee spared FC Mariupol despite two no-shows during the season.)	24	8	4	12	26	34	−8	28	
14	Metalurh Zaporizhzhia	24	6	8	10	24	35	−11	26	Qualification to relegation play-off
15	Podillya Khmelnytskyi (O)	24	5	9	10	22	28	−6	24	Qualification to relegation play-off
16	Dinaz Vyshhorod (R)	24	3	8	13	19	46	−27	17	Relegation to Ukrainian Second League
17	Kremin Kremenchuk (R)	24	3	5	16	14	45	−31	14	Withdrawn after relegation
-	Khust (Note: FC Khust has withdrawn during the first stage and technically was not part of the relegation tournament.)	0	0	0	0	0	0	0	0	Withdrawn during the first stage of the tournament

Source: PFL.ua
Rules for classification: 1) Points; 2) Head-to-head points; 3) Head-to-head goal difference; 4) Head-to-head goals scored; 5) Goal difference in all games; 6) Goals scored in all games (Note: calculation by criteria indicated in rules 2, 3, 4 is conducted with consideration of all teams that have an equal number of tournament points at the moment of calculation and not only among those which after preliminary criteria have appeared more successful).
(O) Play-off winners; (R) Relegated

=== Relegation group results ===
Home \ Away	DIN	KRE	MAR	MET	MIN	NYV	POD	PRY	VKT
Dinaz Vyshhorod					1–2	1–1	1–1	2–2	
Kremin Kremenchuk					1–0	1–2	0–2	0–0	
Feniks-Mariupol					2–0	0–1	0–2	2–3	
Metalurh Zaporizhzhia					2–1	1–1	1–2	0–2	
Mynai	3–0	3–0 (Note: On 15 May 2025, it became known that the game Mynai-Kremin will not take place due to financial situation with Kremin.)	2–0	1–1					0–1
Nyva Ternopil	5–0	3–1	2–3	0–0					0–0
Podillya Khmelnytskyi	0–0	1–1	1–2	2–3					1–1
Prykarpattia Ivano-Frankivsk	4–2	2–1	0–0	4–1					0–1
Viktoriya Sumy					2–2	3–0	0–1	1–1	

Source: Calendar (in Ukrainian)
Legend: Blue = home team win; Yellow = draw; Red = away team win.

=== Relegation group results by week ===
Team ╲ Round	1	2	3	4	5	6	7	8	9	10
Dinaz Vyshhorod	L	L	B	L	D	L	D	B	D	D
Kremin Kremenchuk	L	L	W	D	B	L	D	L	L	B
Feniks-Mariupol	D	B	L	W	W	L	B	W	L	L
Metalurh Zaporizhzhia	L	D	D	B	L	W	W	D	B	L
Mynai	W	D	L	L	L	W	L	W	D	W
Nyva Ternopil	W	W	D	L	D	W	D	D	W	L
Podillya Khmelnytskyi	W	D	W	D	D	L	W	L	W	D
Prykarpattia Ivano-Frankivsk	D	W	D	W	W	W	D	L	D	W
Viktoriya Sumy	B	D	D	W	D	B	L	W	D	W

Source: pfl.ua
B = Bye; W = Win; D = Draw; L = Loss

=== Relegation group goalscorers ===
As of 30 May 2025

Rank	Scorer	Team	Goals (Pen.)
1	Ruslan Palamar	Viktoriya Sumy	9 (7)
2	Vasyl Tsyutsyura	Prykarpattia Ivano-Frankivsk	8 (3)
3	Andriy Riznyk	Nyva Ternopil	7 (0)
3	Dmytro Haladey	Nyva Ternopil	7 (1)
5	Andriy Khoma	Prykarpattia Ivano-Frankivsk	6 (0)
5	Vadym Shavrin	Podillya Khmelnytskyi	6 (1)
7	5 player(s)		5
12	7 player(s)		4
19	6 player(s)		3
25	21 player(s)		2
46	58 player(s)		1

=== Relegation group clean sheets ===
As of 30 May 2025

Rank	Player	Club	Clean sheets
1	Oleksandr Lytvynenko	Viktoriya Sumy	9
2	1 player(s)		7
3	2 player(s)		5
5	1 player(s)		4
6	4 player(s)		3
10	4 player(s)		2
14	7 player(s)		1

== Awards ==
=== Monthly awards ===
Month	Player of the Month		Ref.
Month	Player	Club	Ref.
August 2024	(Ukraine) Maksym Voytikhovskyi	Ahrobiznes Volochysk	
September 2024	(Armenia) Valeriy Voskonyan	SC Poltava	
October 2024	(Ukraine) Oleksiy Lytovchenko	FC Kudrivka	
November 2024	(Ukraine) Anton Yashkov	FC Kudrivka	
April 2025	(Ukraine) Andriy Bezhenar	FC Epitsentr Kamianets-Podilskyi	
May 2025			

=== Round awards ===
Fall half

Round	Player			Coach		
Round	Player	Club	Reference	Coach	Club	Reference
Round 1	(Ukraine) Andriy Bezhenar	Epitsentr Kamianets-Podilskyi		(Ukraine) Oleh Krasnopyorov	FSC Mariupol	
Round 2	(Ukraine) Dmytro Shcherbak	SC Poltava		(Ukraine) Oleksandr Chyzhevskyi	Ahrobiznes Volochysk	
Round 3	(Ukraine) Danylo Kravchuk	Epitsentr Kamianets-Podilskyi		(Ukraine) Dmytro Chyrykal	UCSA Tarasivka	
Round 4	(Ukraine) Ruslan Palamar	Viktoriya Sumy		(Ukraine) Oleh Krasnopyorov (2)	FSC Mariupol	
Round 5	(Ukraine) Dmytro Haladey	Nyva Ternopil		(Ukraine) Yevhen Kalynychenko	Nyva Ternopil	
Round 6	(Paraguay) Pablo Castro	UCSA Tarasivka		(Ukraine) Anatoliy Bezsmertnyi	Viktoriya Sumy	
Round 7	(Ukraine) Roman Tolochko	Ahrobiznes Volochysk		(Ukraine) Serhiy Nahornyak	Epitsentr Kamianets-Podilskyi	
Round 8	(Ukraine) Petro Lutsiv	Metalist Kharkiv		(Ukraine) Andriy Anishchenko	Metalist Kharkiv	
Round 9	(Ukraine) Denys Pidruchnyi	Metalist Kharkiv		(Ukraine) Volodymyr Sysenko	SC Poltava	
Round 10	(Ukraine) Dmytro Korkishko	FC Kudrivka		(Ukraine) Vasyl Baranov	FC Kudrivka	
Round 11	(Brazil) Ari Moura	Metalist 1925 Kharkiv		(Ukraine) Oleksandr Chyzhevskyi (2)	Ahrobiznes Volochysk	
Round 12	(Ukraine) Artur Remenyak	FC Mynai		(Ukraine) Oleksandr Ryabokon	Dinaz Vyshhorod	
Round 13	(Ukraine) Vasyl Kravets	Metalist 1925 Kharkiv		(Netherlands) Patrick van Leeuwen	Metalist 1925 Kharkiv	
Round 14	(Ukraine) Oleksiy Lytovchenko	FC Kudrivka		(Ukraine) Volodymyr Sysenko (2)	SC Poltava	
Round 15	(Ukraine) Ivan Bendera	Epitsentr Kamianets-Podilskyi		(Ukraine) Oleh Krasnopyorov (3)	FSC Mariupol	
Round 16	(Ukraine) Roman Debelko	UCSA Tarasivka		(Ukraine) Yuriy Virt	Nyva Ternopil	
Round 17	(Ukraine) Andriy Riznyk	Nyva Ternopil		(Ukraine) Andriy Anishchenko (2)	Metalist Kharkiv	
Round 18	(Ukraine) Maksym Yevpak	Viktoriya Sumy		(Netherlands) Patrick van Leeuwen (2)	Metalist 1925 Kharkiv	
winter break

Spring half

Round	Player			Coach		
Round	Player	Club	Reference	Coach	Club	Reference
winter break
Round 1	(Ukraine) Anton Savin	Podillya Khmelnytskyi		(Ukraine) Serhiy Kovalets	Podillya Khmelnytskyi	
Round 2	(Ukraine) Ivan Bendera	Epitsentr Kamianets-Podilskyi		(Ukraine) Andriy Anishchenko (3)	Metalist Kharkiv	
Round 3	(Kosovo) Ermir Rashytsia	Metalist 1925 Kharkiv		(Ukraine) Serhiy Nahornyak (2)	Epitsentr Kamianets-Podilskyi	
Round 4	(Ukraine) Vasyl Tsyutsyura	Prykarpattia Ivano-Frankivsk		(Ukraine) Serhiy Nahornyak (3)	Epitsentr Kamianets-Podilskyi	
Round 5	(Ukraine) Ruslan Buryak	Feniks-Mariupol		(Ukraine) Hryhoriy Churilov (acting)	Bukovyna Chernivtsi	
Round 6	(Ukraine) Andriy Bliznichenko	Metalurh Zaporizhzhia		(Ukraine) Vasyl Baranov (2)	FC Kudrivka	
Round 7	(Ukraine) Vladlen Yurchenko	Metalist 1925 Kharkiv		(Ukraine) Serhiy Kovalets (2)	Podillya Khmelnytskyi	
Round 8	(Ukraine) Valeriy Rohozynskyi	FC Kudrivka		(Ukraine) Maksym Feshchuk	Feniks-Mariupol	
Round 9	(Ukraine) Yevhen Streltsov	SC Poltava		(Ukraine) Ihor Tymchenko	SC Poltava	
Round 10	(Ukraine) Anton Demchenko	FC Mynai		(Ukraine) Anatoliy Bezsmertnyi (2)	Viktoriya Sumy	

== Play-offs ==
=== Promotion play-offs ===
Teams that placed 13th and 14th in the 2024–25 Ukrainian Premier League played two-leg play-off with the third and fourth teams of the 2024–25 Ukrainian First League. As a result, both the Ukrainian First League teams (Metalist 1925 and Kudrivka) received promotion after beating the Ukrainian Premier League teams (Vorskla and Livyi Bereh), which in turn were relegated. Due to the Russian 2025 summer escalation and the Russian ballistic missile attack warnings, on 1 June 2025, both matches were suspended but later renewed.

Team 1	Agg.	Team 2	1st leg	2nd leg
Kudrivka	2–2 (4–3 p)	Vorskla Poltava	1–2	1–0
Livyi Bereh Kyiv	0–2	Metalist 1925 Kharkiv	0–1	0–1

=== First Semi-final ===
29 May 2025	Kudrivka	1–2	Vorskla Poltava	Kyiv
15:30	Kozak 83'	Report	Ndukve 23'; Pavlyuk 39'	Stadium: Obolon Arena; Attendance: 1,100; Referee: Dmytro Panchyshyn (Kharkiv)

1 June 2025	Vorskla Poltava	0–1 (3–4 p)	Kudrivka	Poltava
13:00		Report	Lytovchenko 9'	Stadium: Vorskla; Attendance: 2,204; Referee: Mykola Balakin (Kyiv oblast)
	Penalties
	Ndukve (penalty scored); Malysh (penalty scored); Iyede (penalty missed); Kane (penalty missed); Salabay (penalty scored); Sklyar (penalty missed)		(penalty scored) Tuzenko; (penalty missed) Storchous; (penalty scored) Shershen; (penalty scored) Potimkov; (penalty missed) Serdyuk; (penalty scored) Liehostayev

2–2 on aggregate; Kudrivka won 4–3 on penalties and promotion to Premier League. While, Vorskla lost 3–4 on penalties and relegation to First League

=== Second Semi-final ===
29 May 2025	Livyi Bereh Kyiv	0–1	Metalist 1925 Kharkiv	Hnidyn, Kyiv Oblast
18:00		Report	Moura 38'	Stadium: Arena Livyi Bereh; Attendance: 1,167; Referee: Viktor Kopiyevskyi (Kropyvnytskyi)

1 June 2025	Metalist 1925 Kharkiv	1–0	Livyi Bereh Kyiv	Hnidyn, Kyiv Oblast
15:30	Kalitvintsev 90'	Report		Stadium: Arena Livyi Bereh; Attendance: 1,800; Referee: Vitaliy Romanov (Dnipro)

Metalist 1925 Kharkiv won 2–0 on aggregate and promotion to Premier League. While, Livyi Bereh Kyiv lost 0–2 on aggregate and relegation to First League.

=== Relegation play-offs ===
The relegation–promotion play-off games were scheduled to take place between the 6th (14th) and 7th (15th) placed teams in the Relegation group of the First League with the second and third placed teams of the Second League.

In the Second League play-offs, the two group winners (A and B) squared off for the Second League final, with the winner being granted direct promotion. At the same time, the losing team had qualified for the First League relegation play-off stage with one of the First League teams. Simultaneously, the two group runners-up (the 2nd-placed in each group) face each other to determine the season's third-place team (the third-place final), which would qualify for the First League relegation play-off stage with one of the First League teams as well, while the losing team is eliminated. On 6 May 2025, the PFL held a draw to determine which team would play against another team from another league. The Second League teams played their first games at home.

This was the fourth time Metalurh Zaporizhzhia qualified for the post-season play-offs.

Second League play-offs
Final
B1	Kolos-2 Kovalivka	0	3	3
A1	Probiy Horodenka (p)	1	2	3
Third place
B2	FC Chernihiv	3	1	4
A3	Skala 1911 Stryi	2	0	2

First League relegation play-offs
2L	Kolos-2 Kovalivka	0	0	0
15	Podillya Khmelnytskyi	2	1	3
2L	FC Chernihiv	3	2	5
14	Metalurh Zaporizhzhia	0	0	0

Second League teams	Agg.	First League teams	1st leg	2nd leg
Kolos-2 Kovalivka	0 – 3	Podillya Khmelnytskyi	0–2	0–1
FC Chernihiv	5 – 0	Metalurh Zaporizhzhia	3–0	2–0

=== First Semi-final ===
4 June 2025	Kolos-2 Kovalivka	0–2	Podillya Khmelnytskyi	Bucha, Kyiv Oblast
12:00		Report	Balan 19'; Shkinder 48'	Stadium: Stadium Yuvileinyi; Attendance: 0 Referee: Ihor Stashuk

8 June 2025	Podillya Khmelnytskyi	1–0	Kolos-2 Kovalivka	Khmelnytskyi
12:00	Veremiyenko 58'	Report		Stadium: Podillia; Referee: Andriy Likarenko

Podillya Khmelnytskyi won 3–0 on aggregate.

=== Second Semi-final ===
8 June 2025	FC Chernihiv	3–0	Metalurh Zaporizhzhia	Chernihiv
13:00	Shalfeyev 15'; Bezghubchenko 43'; Romanchenko 81' (p)	Report	Kostyuchenko (yellow card) 78' (yellow-red card) 80'	Stadium: Chernihiv Arena; Attendance: 0 Referee: Maksym Firsov

12 June 2025	Metalurh Zaporizhzhia	0–2	FC Chernihiv	Zaporizhzhia
12:00		Report	Koydan 63'; Shumylo 84'	Stadium: Slavutych Arena; Attendance: 0 Referee: Yevhen Tsybulko

FC Chernihiv won 5–0 on aggregate. Metalurh Zaporizhia avoided relegation after withdrawal of FC Mynai.

== Number of teams by region ==
Number	Region	Team(s)
3	Khmelnytskyi Oblast	Ahrobiznes, Epitsentr, and Podillia
2	Kharkiv Oblast	Metalist and Metalist 1925
2	Kyiv Oblast	Dinaz and UCSA
2	Poltava Oblast	Kremin and Poltava
2	Zakarpattia Oblast	Khust and Mynai
1	Chernihiv Oblast	Kudrivka
1	Chernivtsi Oblast	Bukovyna
1	Donetsk Oblast	Mariupol
1	Ivano-Frankivsk Oblast	Prykarpattia
1	Sumy Oblast	Viktoriya
1	Ternopil Oblast	Nyva
1	Zaporizhia Oblast	Metalurh

== See also ==
- 2024–25 Ukrainian Premier League
- 2024–25 Ukrainian Second League
- 2024–25 Ukrainian Football Amateur League
