= Danylyuk =

Danyliuk or Danylyuk (also spelled as Daniliuk or Danilyuk) is a Ukrainian surname derived from the given name Danylo or Danilo. Notable people with this surname include:

- Artem Danylyuk (born 2001), Ukrainian footballer
- Oleksandr Danylyuk (born 1975), Ukrainian politician and statesman
- Oleksandr Danylyuk (lawyer) (born 1981), Ukrainian lawyer and human rights activist
- Roman Danyliuk (born 1993), Ukrainian Paralympic athlete
- Ruslan Danilyuk (born 1974), Belarusian footballer
- Mariya Omelianovych née Danilyuk (born 1960), Ukrainian rower
