= Andriy Bezhenar =

Ukrainian footballer (born 1991)

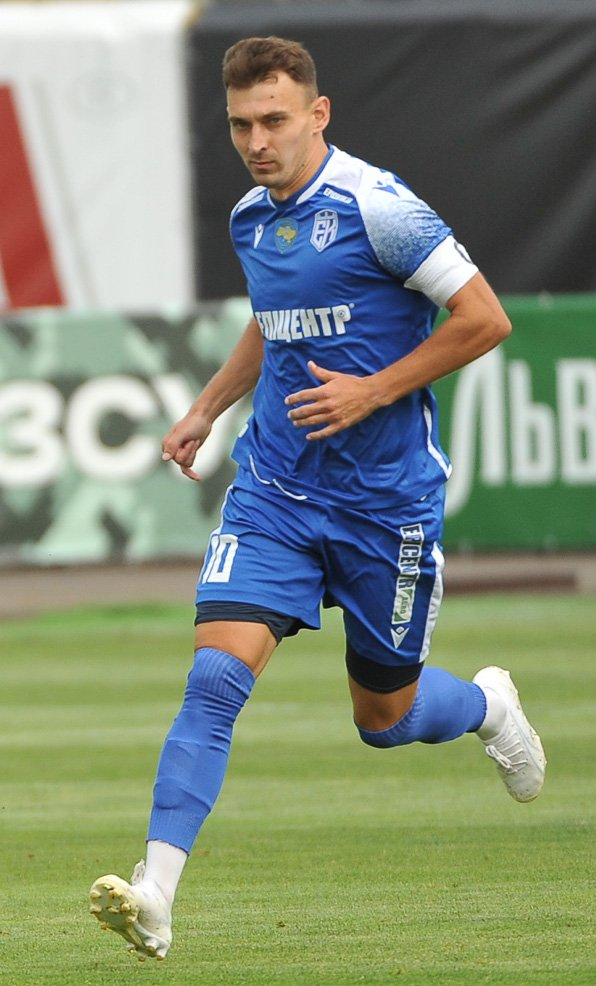

Personal information
- Full name: Andriy Ivanovych Bezhenar
- Date of birth: 16 November 1991 (age 34)
- Place of birth: Novoselytsia, Ukraine
- Height: 1.85 m (6 ft 1 in)
- Position: Midfielder

Team information
- Current team: Epitsentr Kamianets-Podilskyi
- Number: 10

Youth career
- DYuSSh Kelmentsi

Senior career*
Years	Team	Apps	(Gls)
2012	Pidhirya Storozhynets	0	(0)
2013	Nistru Otaci	12	(3)
2013	Bukovyna-2-LS Chernivtsi	5	(1)
2015	FC Voloka	5	(3)
2016	FC Ivankivtsi	8	(5)
2017–2018	Kolos Horodenka	21	(7)
2019	Pokuttya Kolomyia	8	(2)
2019–	Epitsentr Kamianets-Podilskyi	157	(14)
2022–2023	→ Enerhetyk Vinnytsia (loan)	6	(6)

International career^{‡}
2015	Chernivtsi Oblast (regional)	2	(1)
- * Club domestic league appearances and goals as of 3 June 2026 ‡ National team caps and goals as of 15 November 2015

Andriy Ivanovych Bezhenar (Ukrainian: Андрій Іванович Беженар; born 16 November 1991) is a Ukrainian futsal player and professional footballer who plays as a midfielder for Epitsentr Kamianets-Podilskyi.

Besides playing an association football, Bezhenar participates in futsal competitions as well.

== Brief biography ==
Bezhenar is from a village of Novoselytsia, near Kelmentsi, which is the eastern portion of Chernivtsi Oblast. He graduated from a school in Kelmentsi and also attended the Kelmentsi sports school (DYuSSh). Later Bezhenar enrolled in Chernivtsi National University and played for the university football team. His first football coach in Kelmentsi sports school was Oleksandr Kotov.

In 2015, Bezhenar played for the Chernivtsi Oblast football team at the 2015–16 FFU Regions' Cup, which is the Ukrainian qualification stage for the UEFA Regions' Cup. The Chernivtsi Oblast team was eliminated by the Zakarpattia Oblast in the Round of 16.

For a short time, Bezhenar played in Moldova for FC Nistru Otaci, where he became a professional footballer. After receiving an injury, Bezhenar returned to Ukraine, continuing to play at the amateur level. Following the 2017 season, he received a call from an acquaintance in Dunaivtsi offering him to join Epitsentr, which was just restarting at amateurs.

== Honours ==
Epitsentr Kamianets-Podilskyi

- Ukrainian Football Amateur League
  - Runner-up: 2019–20
- Ukrainian First League
  - Winner: 2024–25
- First League player of the month: April of 2025
