= 2023–24 Ukrainian Amateur Cup =

2023–24 Ukrainian Cup for amateur teams
Tournament details
- Country: Ukraine
- Dates: 30 August 2023 – 8 May 2024
- Teams: 27

Final positions
- Champions: FC Mykolaiv
- Runners-up: Shturm Ivankiv
- Ukrainian Cup: FC Mykolaiv; Olympiya Savyntsi

The 2023–24 Ukrainian Amateur Cup was the 28th season of the national football cup competition for amateur teams, which started on August 30, 2023.

The last season champion Druzhba Myrivka was admitted to the 2023–24 Ukrainian Second League and was not eligible to compete.

== Participated clubs ==
In bold are clubs that were active at the same season AAFU championship (parallel round-robin competition).

- Cherkasy Oblast (1): Zlatokrai Zolotonosha
- Dnipropetrovsk Oblast (1): **Penuel Kryvyi Rih**
- Ivano-Frankivsk Oblast (2): Blaho-Yunist Verkhnia, Pokuttia Kolomyia
- Kharkiv Oblast (2): **Avanhard Lozova**, Kolos Sakhnovshchyna
- Kirovohrad Oblast (1): **Zirka Kropyvnytskyi**
- Kyiv Oblast (3): **Shturm Ivankiv**, **Sokil Mykhailivka-Rubezhivka**, Denhoff Denykhivka
- Lviv Oblast (2): FC Mykolaiv, FC Piatnychany
- Odesa Oblast (1): **Tytan Odesa**
- Poltava Oblast (2): **Olimpiya Savyntsi**, Standart Novi Sanzhary
- Ternopil Oblast (3): Dnister Zalishchyky, Halych Zbarazh, Medobory Zelene
- Volyn Oblast (4): FC Volodymyr, FC Kovel, LSTM 536 Lutsk, FC Trostianets
- Zakarpattia Oblast (3): **Maramuresh Nyzhnia Apsha**, **SC Vilkhivtsi**, SKhI Uzhhorod
- Zhytomyr Oblast (2): FC Berdychiv, Polissia Stavky

Notes

- FC Mykolaiv, Olimpiya Savyntsi, Shturm Ivankiv were simultaneously competing at the 2023–24 Ukrainian Cup.

== Bracket ==
The following is the bracket that demonstrates the last four rounds of the Ukrainian Cup, including the final match. Numbers in parentheses next to the match score represent the results of a penalty shoot-out.

Round of 16
Medobory Zelene	1	0	1
FC Mykolaiv	1	4	5
Dnister Zalishchyky	1	1	2
SC Vilkhivtsi	1	2	3
FC Piatnychany	3	0	3
Maramuresh Nyzhnia Apsha (a)	1	2	3
Blaho-Yunist Verkhnia	1	3	4
FC Trostianets	1	2	3
Shturm Ivankiv	2	2	4
Standart Novi Sanzhary	0	0	0
Zirka Kropyvnytskyi	0	1	1
Sokil Mykhailivka-Rubezhivka	2	4	6
Polissia Stavky	1	1	2
Denhoff Denykhivka (a.e.t.)	1	2	3
Olimpiya Savyntsi	1	4	5
Kolos Sakhnovshchyna	0	0	0

Quarter-finals
SC Vilkhivtsi	1	0	1
FC Mykolaiv	2	3	5
Maramuresh Nyzhnia Apsha	0	0	0
Blaho-Yunist Verkhnia	1	1	2
Sokil Mykhailivka-Rubezhivka	0	1	1
Shturm Ivankiv	2	1	3
Denhoff Denykhivka	2	0	2
Olimpiya Savyntsi (a)	1	1	2

Semi-finals
FC Mykolaiv	0	2	2
Blaho-Yunist Verkhnia	1	0	1
Olimpiya Savyntsi	1	0	1
Shturm Ivankiv	1	2	3

Final
Shturm Ivankiv	2	1	3
FC Mykolaiv (a)	2	1	3

== Results ==
=== Round of 32 ===
Many first leg matches were played on 30 August. Second leg is scheduled on 6 September.

Team 1	Agg.	Team 2	1st leg	2nd leg
First leg – August 30, Second leg – September 6
Maramuresh Nyzhnia Apsha	4 – 1	SKhI Uzhhorod	2–1	2–0
FC Volodymyr	0 – 4	FC Piatnychany	0–1	0–3
FC Trostianets	6 – 2	FC Kovel	1–2	5–0
LSTM 536 Lutsk	5 – 7	Medobory Zelene	1–2	4–5
Halych Zbarazh	0 – 6	Blaho-Yunist Verkhnia	0–2	0–4
Pokuttia Kolomyia	0 – 3	Dnister Zalishchyky	0–0	0–3
Sokil Mykhailivka-Rubezhivka	3 – 2	FC Berdychiv	1–0 (Note: The match took place at Yunist Stadium in Kolomyia.)	2–2
Polissia Stavky	8 – 3	Zlatokrai 2017 Zolotonosha	7–1	1–2
Avanhard Lozova	1 – 4	Standart Novi Sanzhary	0–2 (Note: The match took place at Sports School Stadium in Yuriyivka, Dnipropetrovsk Oblast.)	1–2 (Note: The match took place at Olimpiyski Rezervy Stadium in Dnipro.)
Penuel Kryvyi Rih	3 – 4	Kolos Sakhnovshchyna	1–1	2–3
First leg – September 6, Second leg – September 13
Tytan Odesa	2 – 4	Denhoff Denykhivka	1–1	1–3

=== Round of 16 ===
Five clubs received byes to this round FC Mykolaiv, SC Vilkhivtsi, Shturm Ivankiv, Zirka Kropyvnytskyi, Olimpiya Savyntsi. First leg games were played on 20 September, second leg games on 27 September.

Team 1	Agg.	Team 2	1st leg	2nd leg
First leg – September 20, Second leg – September 27
Shturm Ivankiv	4 – 0	Standart Novi Sanzhary	2–0 (Note: The match took place at Central Stadium in Kalynivka, Kyiv Oblast.)	2–0
Polissia Stavky	2 – 3	Denhoff Denykhivka	1–1	1–2 (a.e.t.)
Zirka Kropyvnytskyi	1 – 6	Sokil Mykhailivka-Rubezhivka	0–2	1–4
FC Piatnychany	3 – 3 (a)	Maramuresh Nyzhnia Apsha	3–1	0–2
Blaho-Yunist Verkhnia	4 – 3	FC Trostianets	1–1	3–2
First leg – September 20, Second leg – October 4
Dnister Zalishchyky	2 – 3	SC Vilkhivtsi	1–1	1–2
Medobory Zelene	1 – 5	FC Mykolaiv	1–1	0–4
First leg – September 27, Second leg – October 4
Olimpiya Savyntsi	5 – 0	Kolos Sakhnovshchyna	1–0	4–0

=== Quarterfinals ===
First leg games were played on 11 October second leg games on 18 October.

Team 1	Agg.	Team 2	1st leg	2nd leg
First leg – October 11, Second leg – October 18
Sokil Mykhailivka-Rubezhivka	1 – 3	Shturm Ivankiv	0–2	1–1 (Note: The match took place at Central Stadium in Kalynivka, Kyiv Oblast.)
Denhoff Denykhivka	2 – 2 (a)	Olimpiya Savyntsi	2–1 (Note: The match took place at KNUBA-Arena in Kyiv.)	0–1
Maramuresh Nyzhnia Apsha	0 – 2	Blaho-Yunist Verkhnia	0–1	0–1
SC Vilkhivtsi	1 – 5	FC Mykolaiv	1–2	0–3

=== Semifinals ===
First leg games were played on 3 April second leg games on 10 April.

Team 1	Agg.	Team 2	1st leg	2nd leg
First leg – April 3, Second leg – April 10
FC Mykolaiv	2 – 1	Blaho-Yunist Verkhnia	0–1	2–0 (Note: The match took place at Khet-Tryk Arena in Ivano-Frankivsk.)
Olimpiya Savyntsi	1 – 3	Shturm Ivankiv	1–1 (Note: The match took place at Molodizhnyi Stadium in Poltava.)	0–2 (Note: The match took place at Livyi Bereh training base in Kyiv.)

=== Final ===
Team 1	Agg.	Team 2	1st leg	2nd leg
First leg – 1 May, Second leg – 8 May
Shturm Ivankiv	3 – 3 (a)	FC Mykolaiv	2–2 (Note: The match took place at Livyi Bereh training base in Kyiv.)	1–1

Winner of the 2023–24 Ukrainian Football Cup among amateur teams
FC Mykolaiv (Lviv Oblast); 1st time

== See also ==
- 2023–24 Ukrainian Football Amateur League
- 2023–24 Ukrainian Cup
