= Spilna Sprava =

Political party in Ukraine

Spilna Sprava Civil Movement Громадянський рух «Спільна справа» Гражданское движение «Спильна справа»
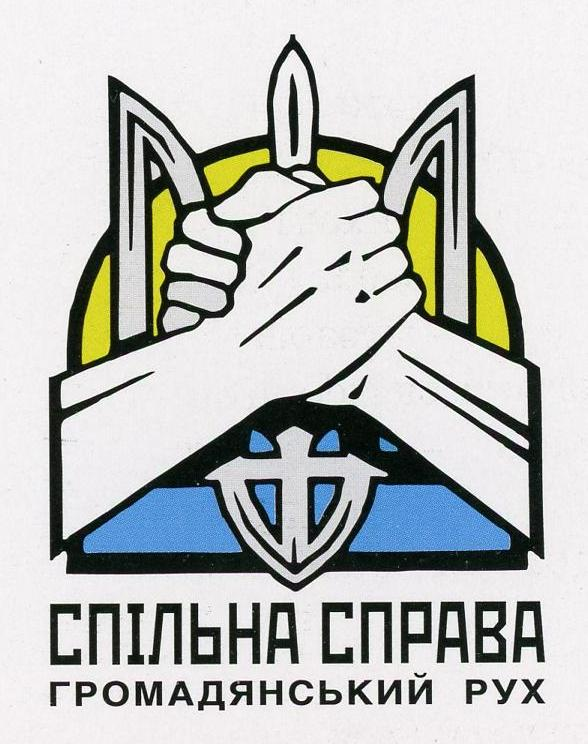
- Leader: Oleksandr Danylyuk
- Founded: December 2010
- Ideology: Ukrainian nationalism; Anti-Yanukovych (before 2014)
- Colours: Yellow and blue (Flag of Ukraine)
- Slogan: "Держава - понад партії, нація - понад класами" "Государство – сверх партий, нация – сверх классов"("The state above parties, the nation above classes")

Party flag

Website
- https://www.spilnasprava.info/

Spilna Sprava (Ukrainian: Спільна справа, lit. 'common cause', 'common issue', Russian: Спильна справа «Общее дело») is a political party in Ukraine registered on 19 March 2015, though active since late 2010. The name of the organisation, taken from Latin Res publica, indicates the republican nature of the movement, as well as symbolises the active civic solidarity of Ukrainians. It was founded in December 2010, during the Tax Maidan protests against the fiscal policies of Viktor Yanukovych.

Spilna Sprava has advocated for free and fair parliamentary and local elections, people's control over the Verkhovna Rada (the parliament of Ukraine) between elections, and fiscal reform. As a political pressure group, Spilna Sprava embraced non-parliamentary means of political mobilisation, and, along with the ultranationalist Right Sector, formed the radical wing of protesters during Euromaidan. The usage of reversed national colours in the party's flag represent a political standpoint, and symbolise national emergency, protest and call for action.

== Early history ==
In December 2010, Spilna Sprava tried to implement a national referendum about discontinuing of the electoral mandates of the members of the Verkhovna Rada and the peaceful removal of President Viktor Yanukovych from power, whom Spilna Sprava accused of authoritarianism in running the country. After the referendum was denied, an electronic signature-gathering campaign began. It was claimed by Spilna Sprava that, by 12 April 2011, nearly 250,000 signatures had been collected.

On 14 May 2011, Spilna Sprava attempted to stage a number of protests across cities in Ukraine culminating with the Indignation Day (Day of Anger) in Kyiv: Massive demonstrations and rallies at the Presidential Administration and Verkhovna Rada buildings. The anti-government protest in Kyiv failed, as 300-400 protesters were confronted by nearly 1,500 riot police officers.

On 8 August 2011, Spilna Sprava tried unsuccessfully to start new anti-government protests, but met with little reaction from Ukrainian society as a whole.

During the 2012 Ukrainian parliamentary election, Spilna Sprava organized an independent monitoring of the pre-election situation and vote casting. It claimed at a press conference on 31 October 2012, after the elections, that significant vote fraud had been uncovered in the Vinnytsia, Khmelnytskyi, Zhytomyr, Poltava, Kyiv, Kirovohrad, and Cherkasy Oblasts of Ukraine.

In 2013, Spilna Sprava, along with major Ukrainian opposition factions, staged a number of rallies and demonstrations in Kyiv and elsewhere, including, at Kyiv's Saint Sofia Square on 18 May. The rally was dispersed by Berkut forces. Several Spilna Sprava activists were detained.

The group's leader is Oleksandr Danylyuk, a lawyer, human rights activist and poet who was earlier involved in campaigns against former President Leonid Kuchma and Mayor of Kyiv Leonid Chernovetskyi, as well as in the 2004 Orange Revolution. Danylyuk has described Spilna Sprava as a "pro-democracy civil movement", though he has also advocated for radical action to oppose corruption in Ukraine. On 3 February 2014, Danylyuk reportedly arrived in London fleeing an imminent arrest in Ukraine after an arrest warrant was issued. He later returned to Kyiv after the fall of Viktor Yanukovych's administration on 22 February 2014.

== Euromaidan ==
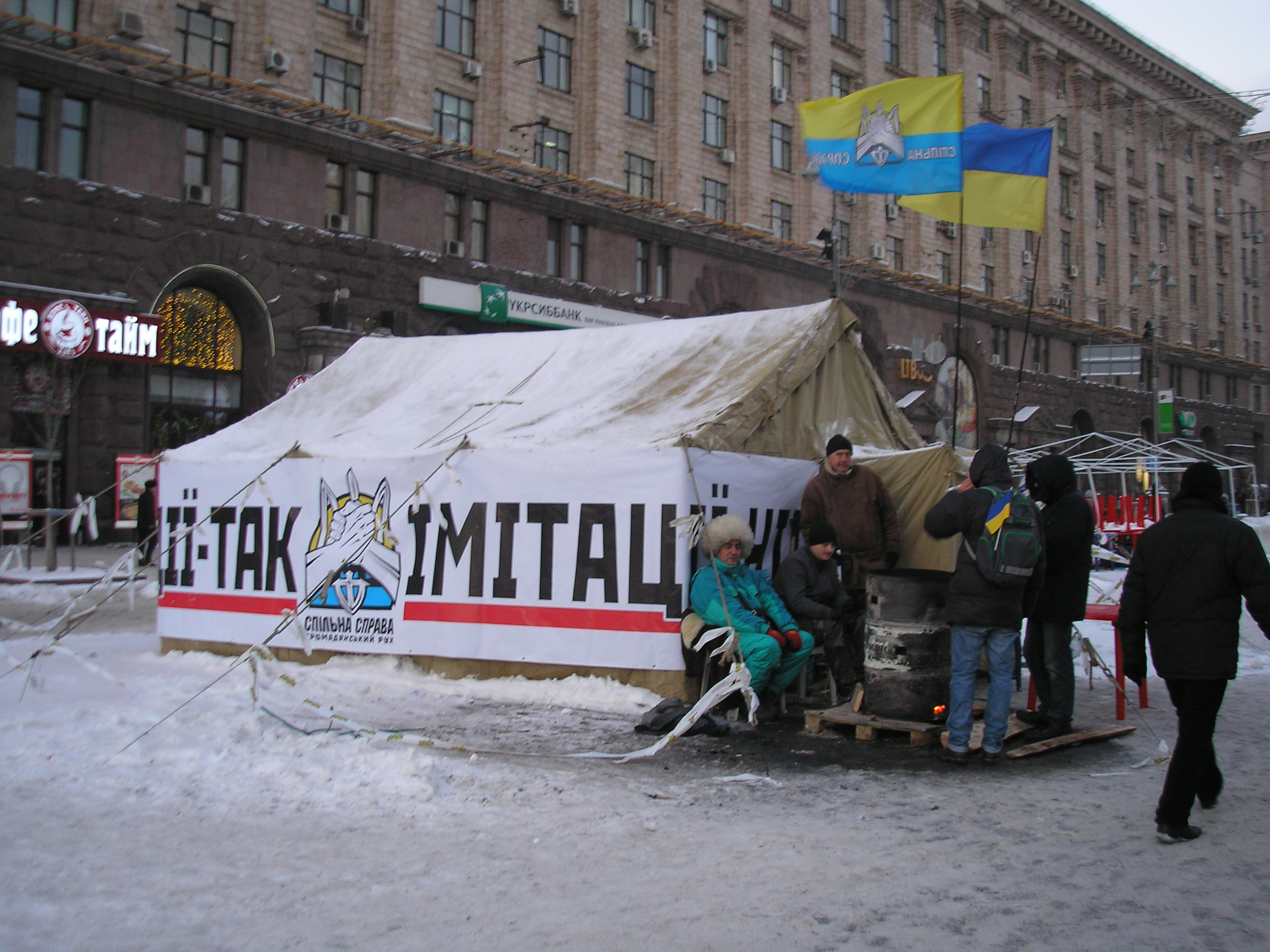
Spilna Sprava's tent at Euromaidan

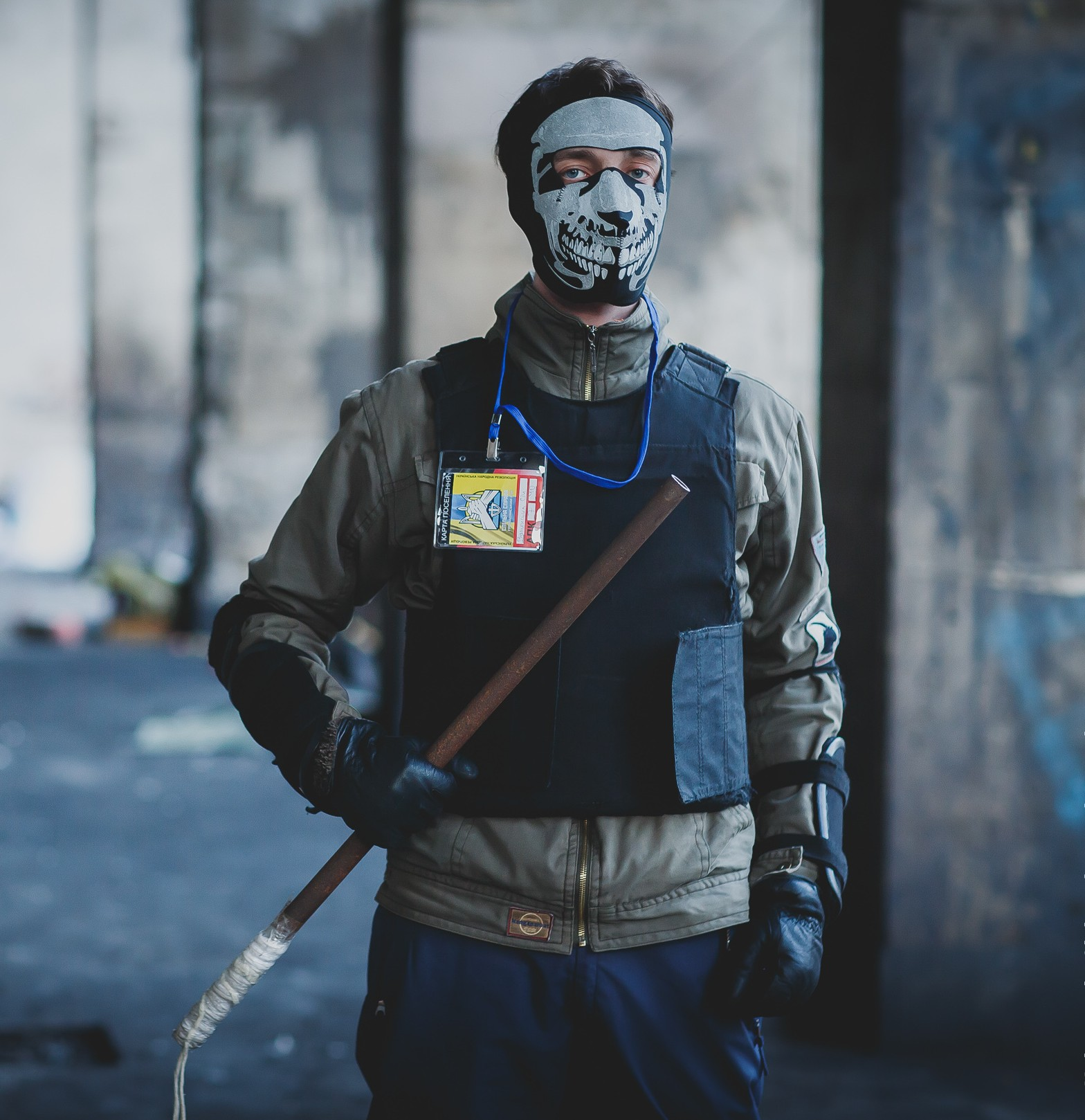
A masked Spilna Sprava activist

During the anti-government Euromaidan in Ukraine in 2014, Spilna Sprava formed a radical faction of the Euromaidan protest movement, while acting independently from Euromaidan leadership. It maintained several tents and recruitment booths at Euromaidan displaying group's distinctive political symbols.

As a direct action-oriented group, Spilna Sprava refused cooperation with the moderate oppositional political actors, accusing them in hidden collaboration with Viktor Yanukovych and secret plans to undermine Euromaidan. It successfully mobilised across the political spectrum, recruiting an unwieldy assortment of political radicals which included common people, veteran activists, veterans of the Soviet–Afghan War, football hooligans and street thugs.

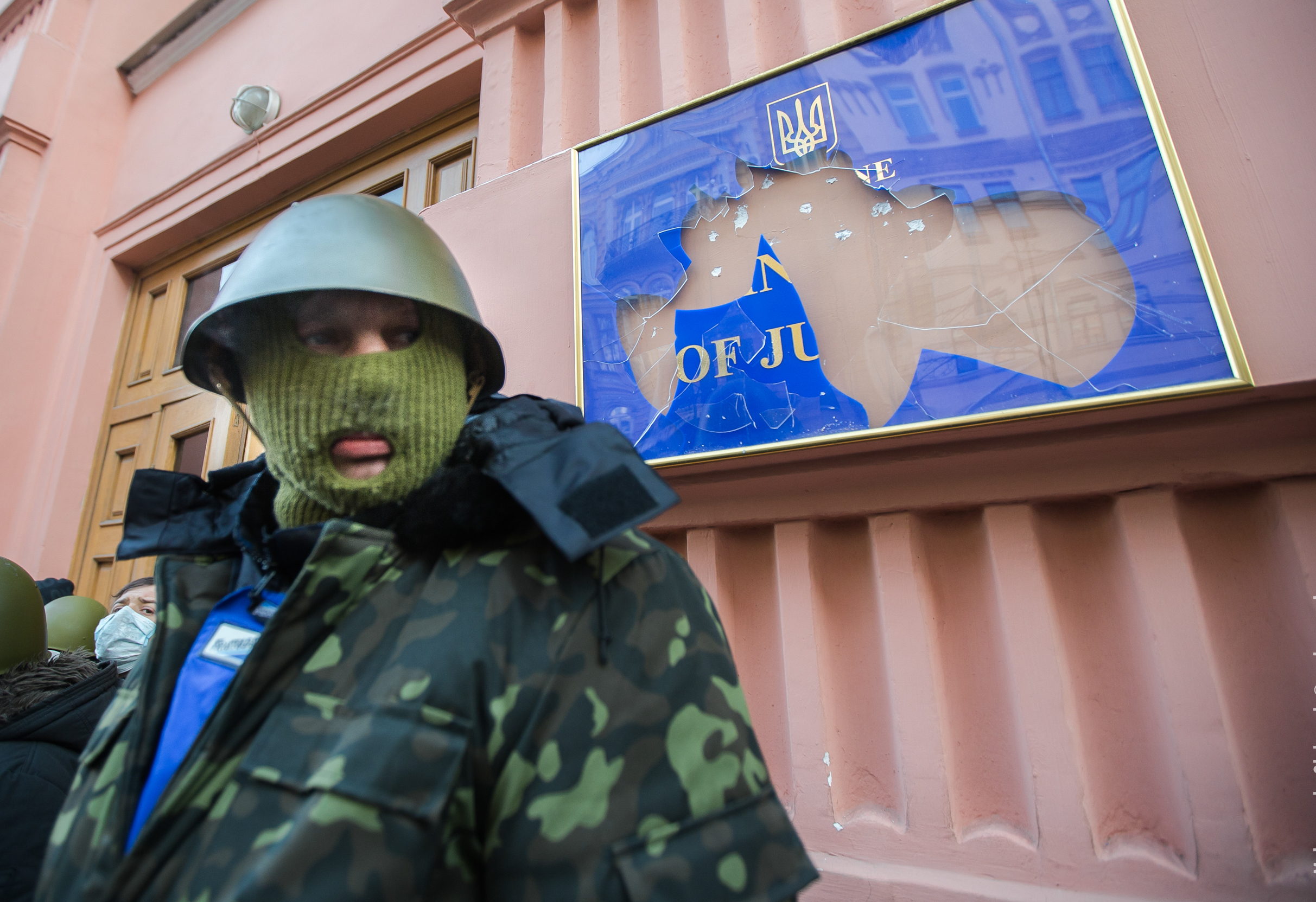
A Spilna Sprava militant at the Ministry of Justice after its capture by protesters

Spilna Sprava militants dressed in fatigues, wore ski masks, and brandished bats, stun guns, knives and Molotov cocktails, and willingly took part in street fights with riot police. Law enforcement officers also engaged militants on multiple occasions. The office of public liaison of the Ukrainian Interior Ministry reported on 31 January 2014 that two armed Spilna Sprava militants with the intention of harming police officers were arrested.

Spilna Sprava came to international prominence after its members seized several key governmental buildings in Kyiv in February 2014, including the Ministry of Justice, Ministry of Agriculture, and Ministry of Energy (the lattermost for only a few hours, purportedly just to show that it could take control of any government office building if it so desired) during Euromaidan.

Activists from Spilna Sprava also stormed and seized the five-storey Ukrainian House convention centre in Kyiv, where a large detachment of the Internal Troops of Ukraine, mostly inexperienced conscripts, had been stationed. Spilna Sprava militants threatened them with Molotov cocktails. "The younger guys wanted to flood the floor with gasoline and burn [the troops] alive," Oleksiy Tsibko, a participant in the Ukrainian House's storming later said. However, following a tense standoff lasting several hours, the protesters formed a corridor and allowed the Internal Troops to leave. The Ukrainian House later became a base of operations for protesters, with a mess-hall, hospital, sleeping quarters, and meeting room. Tsibko added that Soviet–Afghan War veterans were ready to use firearms, saying that they felt that "the battle is already underway, and if [the police] fire so much as one live round into one of our guys, we have enough to respond in kind. Believe me, it won't just be a couple of hundred who lay down dead when it's over."

The Ministry of Internal Affairs stated that it had voluntarily removed its police force instead of risking a bloody confrontation with rioting members from Spilna Sprava. On several occasions, Spilna Sprava clashed with self-defense forces, which sought to rein them in and forcibly evicted them from several locations.

== Criticism ==
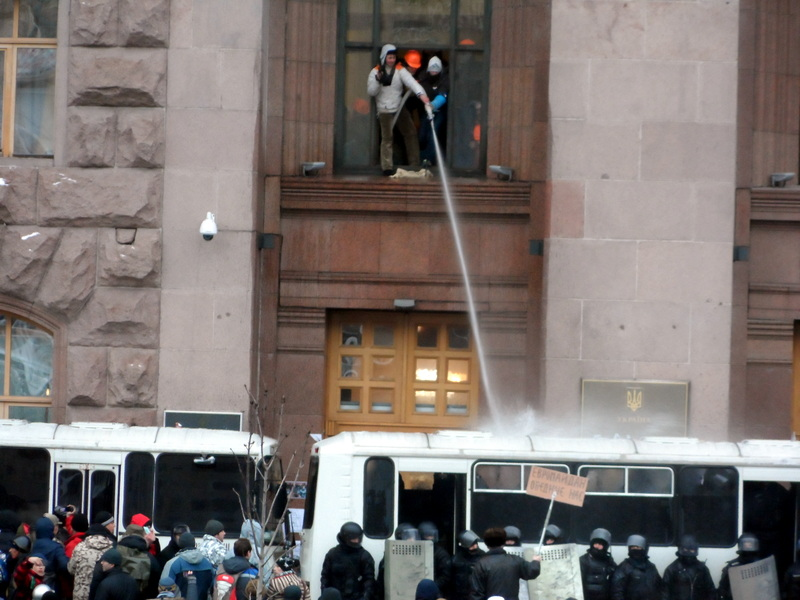
Kyiv City Hall on 11 December 2013

Spilna Sprava was accused by other Euromaidan leaders of sowing and reaping the seeds of discord inside the protest movement, and in staging "provocations" that could have undermined the ongoing talks with President Viktor Yanukovych and the Second Azarov government. Attacks on government offices were considered a possible pretext for imposing martial law in Ukraine, with Justice Minister Olena Lukash arguing in a televised address for the introduction of martial law in the country after the Ministry of Justice building was seized.

European Commissioner for Enlargement and European Neighborhood Policy Štefan Füle warned about the dangers of radicalization of the peaceful protest movement of Euromaidan, and Vitali Klitschko, leader of the Ukrainian Democratic Alliance for Reform, personally came to the Justice Ministry and asked Spilna Sprava activists to retreat from the building. The activists, however, refused, as well as calling Klitschko names. Conversely, Energy and Coal Industry Minister of Ukraine Eduard Stavytsky was able to negotiate an end to the seizure of the ministry's building by Spilna Sprava militants, arguing that its continuation may disrupt the work of the ministry, including the oversight of Ukraine's nuclear power stations.

During Euromaidan, relations between Spilna Sprava and Ukrainian nationalist party Svoboda were especially tense and mistrustful, with Svoboda activists threatening Spilna Sprava militants with stun guns and forcing them out of the Ministry of Agriculture. Six activists from Spilna Sprava were reportedly injured in the confrontation. Tensions between the two groups began at the beginning of Euromaidan, during the police siege of the seized Kyiv City Council building on 11 December 2013. When Spilna Sprava activists left the building to confront riot police in the street, they were locked out by Svoboda militants, and later accused of fleeing the scene. Further deteriorating relations, both riot policemen and Spilna Sprava activists were sprayed in a chilling December wind from a fire hose out of the second-floor window. Svoboda-Spilna Sprava relations following the success of Euromaidan and Yanukovych's flight from Ukraine, however, remained tense. In one incident, on 29 April 2014, the "Self-Defence of Maidan" tried to disperse a torch rally procession in Kyiv staged by Spilna Sprava and the Patriot of Ukraine in commemoration of protesters killed during Euromaidan, resulting in a large brawl near Maidan Nezalezhnosti.
