= Oleksandr Danylyuk (lawyer) =

Ukrainian lawyer and human rights activist

- Данилюк Олександр Володимирович
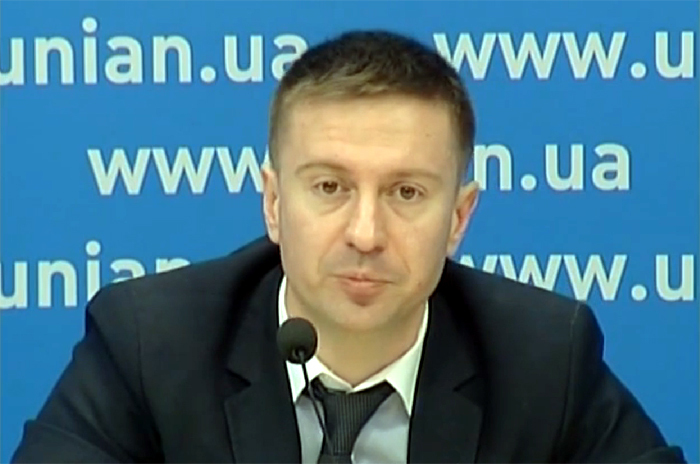
- Oleksandr Danylyuk
- Born: 26 September 1981 (age 44); Kyiv, USSR (now Ukraine)
- Education: Kyiv National Economic University
- Political party: Spilna Sprava

Oleksandr Volodymyrovych Danylyuk (Ukrainian: Олександр Володимирович Данилюк; born September 26, 1981) is a Ukrainian public figure, lawyer, human rights activist. Coordinator of the public movement (now party) "Spilna Sprava" (Common Cause). Chief Advisor to the Minister of Defense of Ukraine Valeriy Heletey on a voluntary basis from July 15 to November 5, 2014.

== Early life and education ==
Born on September 26, 1981, in Kyiv, Ukraine. Mother is a doctor, a father is a scientist. Oleksandr Danyliuk graduated from the Kyiv National Economic University of Ukraine as Master of Laws(legal regulation of economy). Specialist of FDI attraction (USAID certificate).

== Career ==
2001–2003 - Lawyer Conflict resolution of Center for Conflictology and Law&.

2003–2006 - The National Bar Association Member.

2006–2010 - Executive Head of All-Ukrainian Center for Business Assistance.

2010 - Civil movement "Spilna Sprava" (Common Cause) Coordinator

2014 - Advisor to the Chief of the DSS (Department for State Security).

2014–2015 Ministry of defense of Ukraine. Chief Advisor to the Minister of Defense(de facto – Chief of Staff). Personal participation in military and special operations in Donbas, in particular, in the recapturing Sloviansk, Kramatorsk and protection of Mariupol.

From 2015: Centre for Defence Reforms, Chairman. Development of a number of reforms in the area of national security and defense, including:

- The concept of asymmetric response to Russian aggression;
- Reforming the structure of the Armed Forces;
- Creation of SOCCOM;
- Establishing a Joint Intelligence Committee;
- Creation of a Committee for economical warfare;
- The concept of information warfare;

== Presidential candidate 2019 ==
Registered as a presidential candidate in Ukraine number 22. In the 2019 Ukrainian presidential election he won 0.02% of the votes.

== Family ==
Danyliuk is married and has two children.
