= Oleksandr Zhdanov =

Ukrainian-Israeli football defender

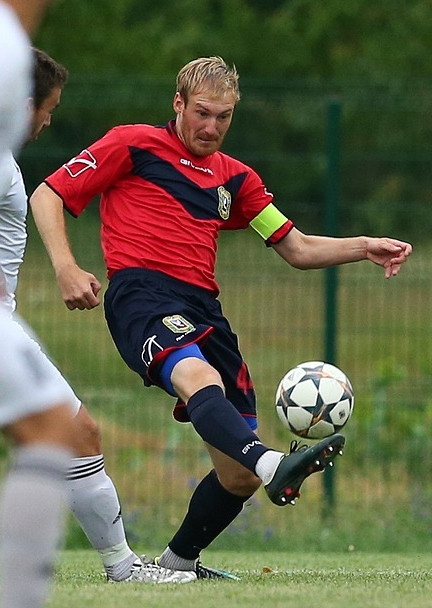

Personal information
- Full name: Oleksandr Mykolayovych Zhdanov
- Date of birth: 27 May 1984 (age 42)
- Place of birth: Kharkiv, Ukrainian SSR, Soviet Union
- Height: 1.82 m (5 ft 11 1/2 in)
- Position: Defender

Team information
- Current team: Podillia Khmelnytskyi

Youth career
- 1998–2001: Metalist Kharkiv

Senior career*
Years	Team	Apps	(Gls)
2003–2006	Hazovyk-KhGV Kharkiv	73	(8)
2006–2009	Lviv	63	(1)
2007–2008	→ Knyazha Shchaslyve (loan)	29	(1)
2009–2012	Kryvbas Kryvyi Rih	44	(0)
2012–2013	Poltava	39	(2)
2014	Slutsk	11	(0)
2014–2015	Kolos Zachepylivka (amateurs)	16	(1)
2016	Hapoel Beit She'an	15	(0)
2016	Bnei Sakhnin	0	(0)
2016–2017	Maccabi Netanya	19	(0)
2017–2019	Metalist 1925 Kharkiv	54	(5)
2020–2021	Podillya Khmelnytskyi	9	(2)

Managerial career
- 2024: Podillya Khmelnytskyi (caretaker)
- * Club domestic league appearances and goals

Oleksandr Zhdanov (Ukrainian: Олександр Миколайович Жданов; born 27 May 1984) is a former professional Ukrainian-Israeli football defender.

== Honours ==
- Liga Leumit
  - Winner (1): 2016–17
