= Andriy Anishchenko =

Ukrainian footballer and coach

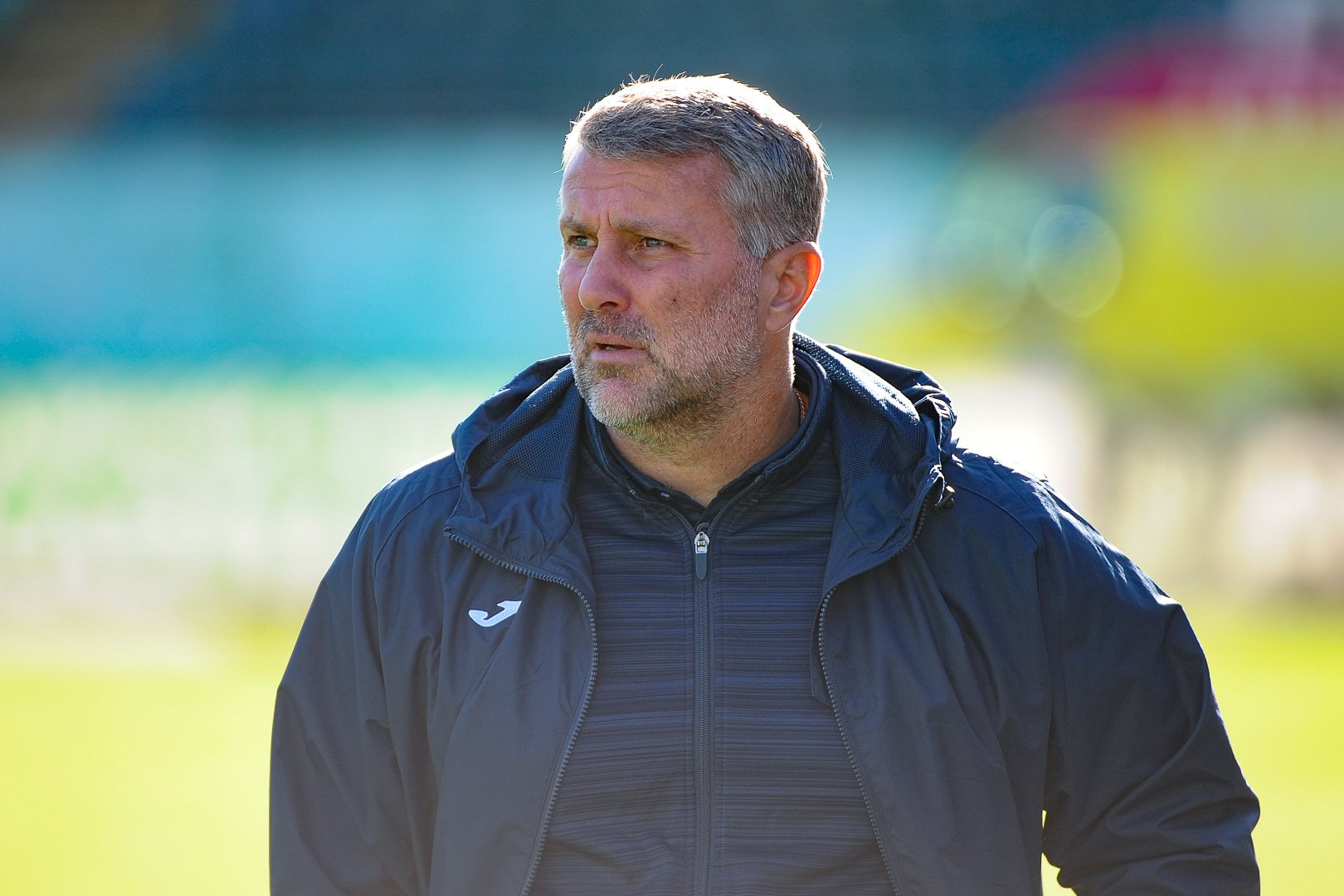

Personal information
- Full name: Andriy Anatoliyovych Anishchenko
- Date of birth: 16 April 1975 (age 51)
- Place of birth: Kharkiv, Ukrainian SSR
- Height: 1.82 m (5 ft 11 1/2 in)
- Position: Defender

Team information
- Current team: Metalist Kharkiv (manager)

Senior career*
Years	Team	Apps	(Gls)
1992–1993	Olympik Kharkiv	8	(0)
1993	Tavriya Kherson	8	(0)
1994	Selmash Mogilev	8	(0)
1994–1995	Artania Ochakiv	31	(1)
1995–1996	Krylia Sovetov Samara	16	(0)
1996–1997	Metalist Kharkiv	8	(0)
1997	FC Krystal Parkhomivka		
1998–2003	Kryvbas Kryvyi Rih	109	(1)
1999–2001	→ Kryvbas-2 Kryvyi Rih	15	(2)
2003–2004	Arsenal Kharkiv	23	(0)
2004	Helios Kharkiv	1	(0)
2004–2005	Arsenal Kharkiv	15	(1)
2005–2008	Helios Kharkiv	84	(6)

Managerial career
- 2009–2015: Metalist Kharkiv (reserves)
- 2022–2023: Metalist Kharkiv (reserves)
- 2023–: Metalist Kharkiv
- * Club domestic league appearances and goals

Andriy Anatoliyovych Anishchenko (Ukrainian: Андрій Анатолійович Аніщенко; born 16 April 1975) is a Ukrainian football coach and a former player.

== Career ==
A native of Kharkiv, Anishchenko started his career at Olimpik Kharkiv, which competed in the Transitional League (which existed until 1995). Later, he briefly played for Tavria Kherson and Transmash Mogilev (in Belarus). In 1994, he joined Artania Ochakiv, a third-tier club, where he became a regular in the club's first team. In 1995 and 1996, Anishchenko played in the Russian Federation. In 1996, he returned to Kharkiv, where he played for a couple of Kharkiv clubs, including the region's main club, Metalist Kharkiv. In 1998, Anishchenko joined Kryvbas Kryvyi Rih, for which he played most of the matches in his professional career, all in the Ukrainian top tier. During that time, for a couple of seasons, Kryvbas was among the top three clubs in Ukraine. In 2003, he once again returned to Kharkiv, where he played for the local lower-tier clubs and eventually retired in 2008.

After his retirement, Anishchenko became a coach on the Metalist coaching staff. Since 2011, he has headed the Metalist coaching staff of the club's reserve squad. In 2019, he was placed in charge of the Metalist football academy. In 2023, Anishchenko became the head coach of Metalist.

== Honours ==
FC Kryvbas Kryvyi Rih

- Ukrainian Premier League bronze: 1998–99, 1999–2000
