= Bohdan Boychuk =

Ukrainian footballer

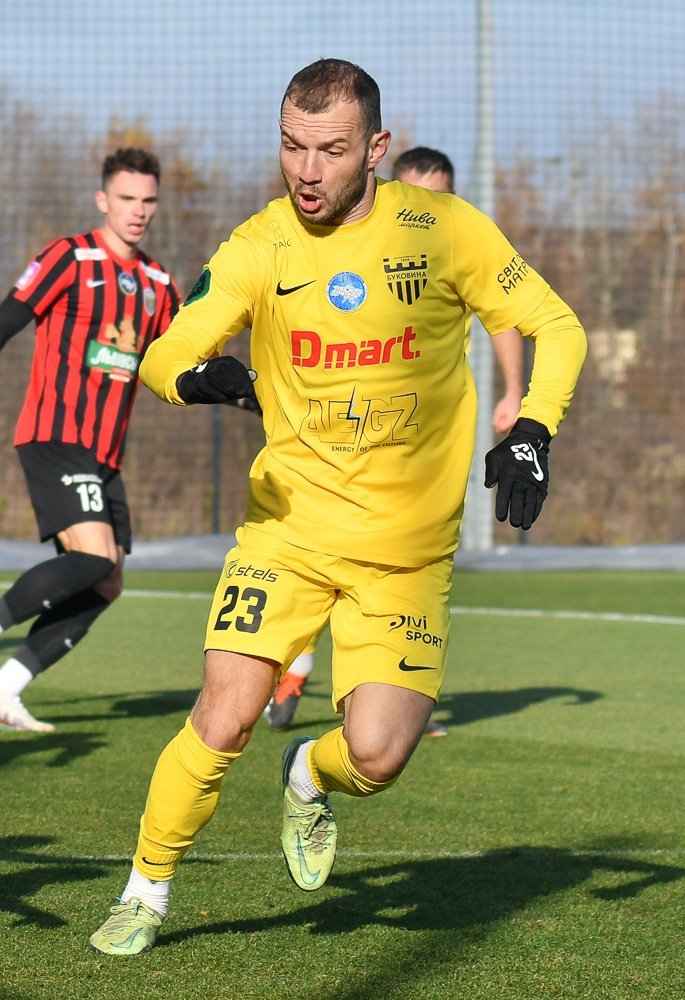

Personal information
- Full name: Bohdan Serhiyovych Boychuk
- Date of birth: 30 May 1996 (age 30)
- Place of birth: Kherson, Ukraine
- Height: 1.70 m (5 ft 7 in)
- Positions: Midfielder; forward

Team information
- Current team: Bukovyna Chernivtsi
- Number: 10

Youth career
- 2009–2010: Olimpik Donetsk
- 2010–2011: Metalist Kharkiv

Senior career*
Years	Team	Apps	(Gls)
2011–2016	Metalist Kharkiv	4	(0)
2016	Zaria Bălți	6	(1)
2016–2017	Neftekhimik Nizhnekamsk	19	(0)
2018	Dinamo-Auto Tiraspol	20	(2)
2019–2023	Rukh Lviv	66	(4)
2023	Metalist Kharkiv	9	(2)
2023–2024	Chornomorets Odesa	24	(4)
2024–	Bukovyna Chernivtsi	34	(9)

International career
2012	Ukraine U16	3	(2)
- * Club domestic league appearances and goals as of 24 December 2025

Bohdan Boychuk (Ukrainian: Богдан Сергійович Бойчук; born 30 May 1996) is a Ukrainian professional footballer who plays for Bukovyna Chernivtsi.

== Career ==
Boychuk is a product of the FC Olimpik Donetsk and Metalist Kharkiv Youth School Systems.

He made his debut for FC Metalist in the match against FC Dynamo Kyiv on 1 March 2015 in the Ukrainian Premier League.

In July 2023 Boychuk became a player of Chornomorets Odesa. In July 2024 Boychuk became a player of Bukovyna Chernivtsi.
