= Dmytro Haladey =

Ukrainian footballer

Personal information
- Full name: Dmytro Oleksandrovych Haladey
- Date of birth: 26 August 1999 (age 27)
- Place of birth: Dubno, Ukraine
- Height: 1.81 m (5 ft 11 in)
- Position: Forward

Team information
- Current team: Kulykiv-Bilka
- Number: 26

Youth career
- –2012: DYuSSh Dubno
- 2012–2017: Pansion Shepetivka

Senior career*
Years	Team	Apps	(Gls)
2018–2020	Vyshnivets		
2022	Ahrobiznes Volochysk	0	(0)
2022–2023	Vysoke Myto	0	(0)
2023–2025	Nyva Ternopil	64	(15)
2026–	Kulykiv-Bilka	9	(1)
- * Club domestic league appearances and goals as of 4 June 2026

Dmytro Oleksandrovych Haladey (Ukrainian: Дмитро Олександрович Галадей; born 26 August 1999) is a Ukrainian professional footballer who plays as a forward for Ukrainian club Kulykiv-Bilka.

During the 2024–25 season, Haladey was honored as a player of the round.
