= Vasyl Tsyutsyura =

Ukrainian footballer

Personal information
- Full name: Vasyl Ihorovych Tsyutsyura
- Date of birth: 26 February 1994 (age 32)
- Place of birth: Mizhrichchia, Ivano-Frankivsk Oblast, Ukraine
- Height: 1.76 m (5 ft 9 in)
- Position: Centre-forward

Team information
- Current team: Prykarpattia Ivano-Frankivsk
- Number: 14

Youth career
- 2007–2011: Prykarpattia Ivano-Frankivsk

Senior career*
Years	Team	Apps	(Gls)
2012–2016	Skala Stryi	116	(32)
2015	→ Stal Dniprodzerzhynsk (loan)	0	(0)
2017–2018	Naftovyk-Ukrnafta Okhtyrka	35	(6)
2018–	Prykarpattia Ivano-Frankivsk	175	(38)
- * Club domestic league appearances and goals as of 4 June 2026

Vasyl Ihorovych Tsyutsyura (Ukrainian: Василь Ігорович Цюцюра; born 26 February 1994) is a Ukrainian professional footballer who plays as a centre-forward for Ukrainian club Prykarpattia Ivano-Frankivsk.
