= Oleksiy Lytovchenko =

Ukrainian footballer

Personal information
- Date of birth: 15 August 1996 (age 30)
- Place of birth: Kyiv, Ukraine
- Height: 1.74 m (5 ft 9 in)
- Position: Left winger

Team information
- Current team: Olimp Dmytrivka (amateurs)

Senior career*
Years	Team	Apps	(Gls)
2017–2019	Nyva Ternopil	36	(14)
2020–2021	Cherkashchyna	8	(1)
2020–2021	Horishni Plavni	11	(0)
2022–2023	SC Chaika	16	(12)
2023–2024	Livyi Bereh Kyiv	25	(5)
2024–2025	Kudrivka	16	(3)
2026–	Olimp Dmytrivka (amateurs)	0	(0)
- * Club domestic league appearances and goals as of 18 October 2026

Oleksiy Lytovchenko (Ukrainian: Олексій Ігорович Литовченко; born 15 August 1996) is a Ukrainian professional footballer who plays as a left winger.

== Career ==
=== Nyva Ternopil ===
In 2017 Lytovchenko moved to Nyva Ternopil in the city of Ternopil and on 3 september 2017, he made his debut Ukrainian Second League in the home match against Podillya Khmelnytskyi.

=== Cherkashchyna ===
In 2020 he signed for Cherkashchyna in Ukrainian Second League. He made his debut with the new club against Real Pharma Odesa in Odesa. On 10 october 2020, he scored his first goal against Mykolaiv-2.

=== SC Chaika ===
In 2022 joyned SC Chaika in Ukrainian Second League. On 3 september 2022 he made his debut against Nyva Buzova. On 6 June, he was included in the Best XI of Round 4 of the 2022-23 Ukrainian Second League.

=== Livyi Bereh Kyiv ===
In 2023 he signed for Livyi Bereh Kyiv. He helped the club to be promoted to the Ukrainian Premier League, but before the play off, his contract was expired.

=== Kudrivka ===
In summer 2024 he moved to Kudrivka in Ukrainian First League. On 6 June, he was included in the Best XI of Round 14 of the 2024-25 Ukrainian First League and he was also elected player of the month for october. On 24 December 2025 his contract was terminated by mutual agreement with the club.

== Honours ==
=== Individual ===
- Ukrainian First League Player of the Month: October 2024
