= FC Mykolaiv =

Football club based in Mykolaiv, Lvivska Oblast, Ukraine

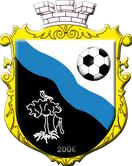

FC Mykolaiv is a football club based in Mykolaiv, Lvivska Oblast, Ukraine.

== Overview ==
The club was originally called Tsementnyk-Khorda Mykolaiv and was supported by the cement factory in the town.

Tsementnyk-Khorda performed well at the amateur level in the 1996–97 season and finished runners-up in the competition. This was an entry criterion to the professional leagues and the following season the club entered the Druha Liha.

The club was competitive at that level for 4 seasons and then abruptly withdrew from the competition in 2001 after their sponsors decided not to fund the team.

Currently the club competes in the Lvivska Oblast competition.

== Honors ==
Ukrainian Amateur Cup

- Winners (1): 2023–24

Ukrainian football championship among amateurs

- Runners-up (1): 1996-97

Soviet Cup for collective teams of physical culture

- Finalists (1): 1970

Ukrainian Cup for collective teams of physical culture

- Finalists (1): 1979

Lviv Oblast football championship

- Winners (3): 1983, 1986, 1992
- Runners-up (2): 1979, 2013

Lviv Oblast Cup

- Holders (1): 1970

== League and cup history ==
Season	Div.	Pos.	Pl.	W	D	L	GS	GA	P	Domestic Cup	Europe	Notes
1997–98	3rd "A"	6	34	15	6	13	34	34	51	1/64 finals		
1998–99	3rd "A"	3	28	16	5	7	31	24	53	1/32 finals		
1999-00	3rd "A"	4	30	14	8	8	38	24	50	1/16 finals Second League Cup		
2000–01	3rd "A"	5	30	16	3	11	41	29	51	1/8 finals Second League Cup		
2001–02	3rd "A"	18	36	5	3	28	18	41	31	First Round		Club withdraws
2002–	Club reforms and competes at the Amateur Level											
