= Andriy Riznyk =

Ukrainian footballer

Personal information
- Full name: Andriy Ivanovych Riznyk
- Date of birth: 15 March 2000 (age 26)
- Place of birth: Nyrkiv, Ukraine
- Height: 1.76 m (5 ft 9 in)
- Position: Centre-forward

Team information
- Current team: Ahrobiznes Volochysk
- Number: 9

Youth career
- 2013–2014: DYuSSh Zalishchyky
- 2017: Ternopil-Pedlitsey

Senior career*
Years	Team	Apps	(Gls)
2015–2016	Ternopil	3	(1)
2017–2018	Krystal Chortkiv	29	(11)
2018–2019	Ahronyva Zavodske	25	(26)
2019–2025	Nyva Ternopil	110	(19)
2025	Livyi Bereh Kyiv	17	(0)
2026–	Ahrobiznes Volochysk	12	(1)
- * Club domestic league appearances and goals as of 3 June 2026

Andriy Ivanovych Riznyk (Ukrainian: Андрій Іванович Різник; born 15 March 2000) is a Ukrainian professional footballer who plays as a centre-forward for Ukrainian club Ahrobiznes Volochysk.

Riznyk started out playing for FC Ternopil where his first coach was Vasyl Ivehesh. He signed his first contract at 15 in 2015 with Ternopil. His debut in the First league took place on 30 August 2015 at the match against Illichivets Mariupol.
