= Ari Moura =

Brazilian footballer (born 1996)

Personal information
- Full name: Ari Moura Vieira Filho
- Date of birth: 31 July 1996 (age 30)
- Place of birth: Quaraí, Brazil
- Height: 1.74 m (5 ft 9 in)
- Position: Winger

Youth career
- Associação Rosário de Esportes

Senior career*
Years	Team	Apps	(Gls)
2016	Veranópolis	1	(0)
2017	São Luiz		
2017	Marcílio Dias		
2018	Toledo	8	(0)
2018–2024	Metropolitano	17	(2)
2019	→ Confiança (loan)	13	(1)
2019–2020	→ Brasil de Pelotas (loan)	8	(1)
2020	→ Chapecoense (loan)	7	(0)
2020–2021	→ Confiança (loan)	35	(3)
2021	→ Paysandu (loan)	4	(0)
2021–2022	→ Bnei Sakhnin (loan)	27	(2)
2022–2023	→ Sektzia Ness Ziona (loan)	27	(2)
2023–2024	→ Metalist 1925 Kharkiv (loan)	19	(3)
2024–2026	Metalist 1925 Kharkiv	33	(11)
2026	Juventude	0	(0)
- * Club domestic league appearances and goals as of 3 June 2026

Ari Moura Vieira Filho (born 31 July 1996), is a Brazilian professional footballer who plays as a winger.

Ari Moura was selected as a player of the Round during the 2023–24 Ukrainian Premier League round 29 when on his efforts of scoring two goals Metalist 1925 Kharkiv managed to tie with Polissya Zhytomyr at 3.
