= Artem Danylyuk =

Ukrainian footballer (born 2001)

Personal information
- Full name: Artem Yuriyovych Danylyuk
- Date of birth: 6 July 2001 (age 25)
- Place of birth: Rivne, Ukraine
- Height: 1.78 m (5 ft 10 in)
- Position: Left-back

Team information
- Current team: Mariupol

Youth career
- 2011–2014: Veres Rivne
- 2014–2018: UFK-Karpaty Lviv

Senior career*
Years	Team	Apps	(Gls)
2018–2020	Karpaty Lviv	0	(0)
2020–2023	Veres Rivne	5	(0)
2022–2023	→ Bukovyna Chernivtsi (loan)	10	(0)
2023	Bukovyna Chernivtsi	17	(0)
2024	Viktoriya Sumy	18	(2)
2025–	Mariupol	5	(0)

International career^{‡}
2016–2017	Ukraine U16	7	(0)
2017–2018	Ukraine U17	12	(0)
2019	Ukraine U18	3	(0)
- * Club domestic league appearances and goals as of 10 June 2025 ‡ National team caps and goals as of 7 September 2021

Artem Yuriyovych Danylyuk (Ukrainian: Артем Юрійович Данилюк; born 6 July 2001) is a Ukrainian professional footballer who plays as a left-back for Mariupol.

== Career ==
Born in Rivne, Danylyuk is a product of the local Veres Rivne youth sportive school and the UFK-Karpaty Lviv youth sportive school system.

He played for FC Karpaty in the Ukrainian Premier League Reserves, but never made his debut for the main-squad team in the Ukrainian First League. In September 2020 he signed a deal with his home team Veres Rivne, that played in this time in the Ukrainian First League, where he made his debut as a second-half substitute in the home winning match against FC Polissya Zhytomyr on 20 March 2021.
