= Polonia =

Polonia may refer to:

- Poland, in Latin

== Places ==
- Polonia Maior or Greater Poland, a historical region of Poland
- Polonia Minor or Lesser Poland, a historical region of Poland
- Polonia, Manitoba, Canada
- Polonia, Texas, United States
- Polonia, Wisconsin, United States
- Pollonia, Milos, Greece
- Polonia Triangle, Chicago, United States
- Polonia Township, Roseau County, Minnesota, United States
- Polonia International Airport, Indonesia
- Medan Polonia, Medan, North Sumatra, Indonesia
- Camp Polonia, Ahvaz, Iran
- 1112 Polonia, an asteroid
- Hotel Polonia Palace, historic four-star hotel in Warsaw on Jerusalem Avenue
- Hotel Polonia Palast, hotel in Łódź, Poland
- Ołdaki-Polonia, village in Ostrów County, Masovian Voivodeship, Poland

== Arts and entertainment ==
- Polònia, a comedy television programme shown in Catalonia, Spain
- Polonia (personification), the symbolic representation of Poland, including a list of art works titled Polonia
- Polonia (Elgar), a musical work by Edward Elgar
- Polonia (Wagner), an 1836 overture by Richard Wagner
- Polonia brothers, an American low-budget filmmaking duo
- Symphony in B minor (Paderewski), subtitled "Polonia", a 1908 symphony by Ignacy Jan Paderewski
- Polonia sive de situ, populis, moribus, magistratibus et Republica regni Polonici libri duo, book by Marcin Kromer, first published in Cologne in 1577 in Latin
- Polonia-Express, East German film directed by Kurt Jung-Alsen
- Gaude Mater Polonia, medieval Polish hymns, written in Latin
- Stella Polonia, Polish folk song and dance ensemble associated with Our Lady Queen of Poland Parish in Toronto, Ontario, Canada
- The Spirit of Polonia, also known as Solidarity, by Edmund Lewandowski is a sculpture in Milwaukee, United States
- TVP Polonia, a Polish cable and satellite channel of Telewizja Polska
- Polonia 1, Polish commercial television channels
- Radio Polonia International, international broadcasting station of Poland

== People ==
- Cleto Polonia (born 1968), Italian footballer
- Louis Polonia (1935–2005), French footballer
- Luis Polonia (born 1963), Major League Baseball outfielder and designated hitter
- Mark Polonia and John Polonia (born 1968), twin brothers and filmmakers who founded Polonia brothers
- Polonia Ronzi (1835–1912), Italian operatic tenor, composer, conductor, and voice teacher
- Polonia Sanz y Ferrer (died 1892), Spanish dentist

== Sport clubs ==
- FC Polonia Berlin, Germany
- Polonia Adelaide, now Croydon FC, Australia
- Polonia Bydgoszcz
- Polonia Bytom
- Polonia Cernăuți, Romania
- Polonia Chodzież
- Polonia Gdańsk (disambiguation)
- Polonia Hamburg, Germany
- Polonia Karwina, Czechoslovakia
- Polonia Khmelnytsky, Ukraine
- Polonia London, United Kingdom
- Polonia Nowy Tomyśl
- Maribyrnong Polonia, now Western Eagles FC, Melbourne, Australia
- Polonia Piła
- Polonia Poznań
- Polonia Przemyśl
- Polonia Słubice
- Polonia Środa Wielkopolska
- Polonia Świdnica
- KS Polonia Vilnius, Lithuania
- Polonia Warsaw

== Other uses ==
- SS Polonia (1910), passenger steamship that was built in Scotland in 1910
- Polonia (train), a EuroCity express train between Austria and Warsaw
- Konwent Polonia, Polish student corporation
- Polish diaspora (Polonia in Polish)
  - World Polonia Games, sports event, organized every two years for members of Polonia
  - American Polonia
- The former name of the Broadway-Fillmore neighborhood in Buffalo, New York
- Polonia Technica, non-profit organization, established in 1941 in New York City
- Miss Polonia, national Beauty pageant in Poland
- Order of Polonia Restituta, Polish state order

== See also ==
- Polonium
- Polonyna (disambiguation)
- Poloniny (disambiguation)
