= Football in Berlin =

Location map of professional football clubs in the city of Berlin

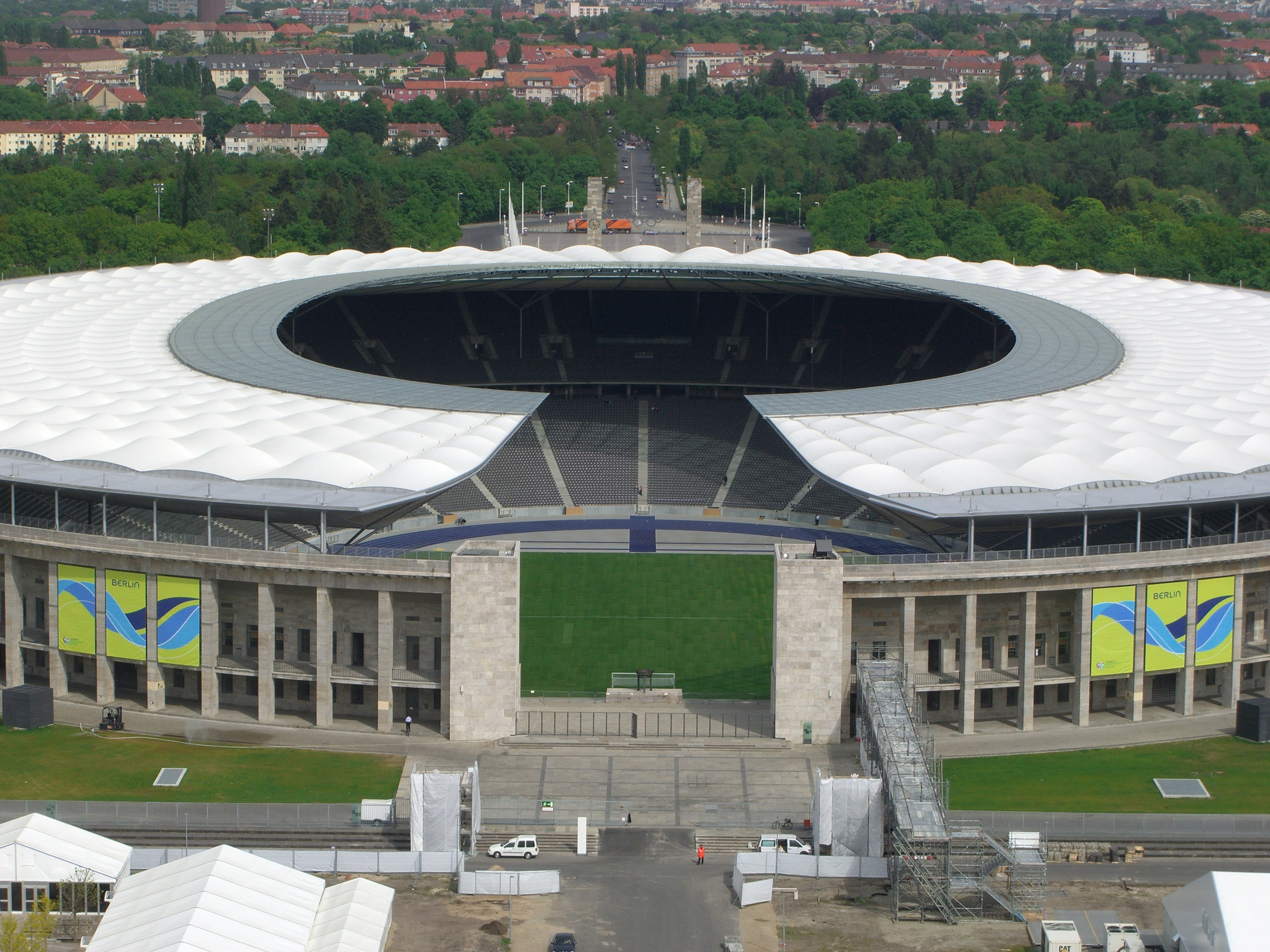
Berlin's Olympiastadion hosted the 2006 FIFA World Cup Final. The DFB Cup Final is held every year at the venue since 1985.

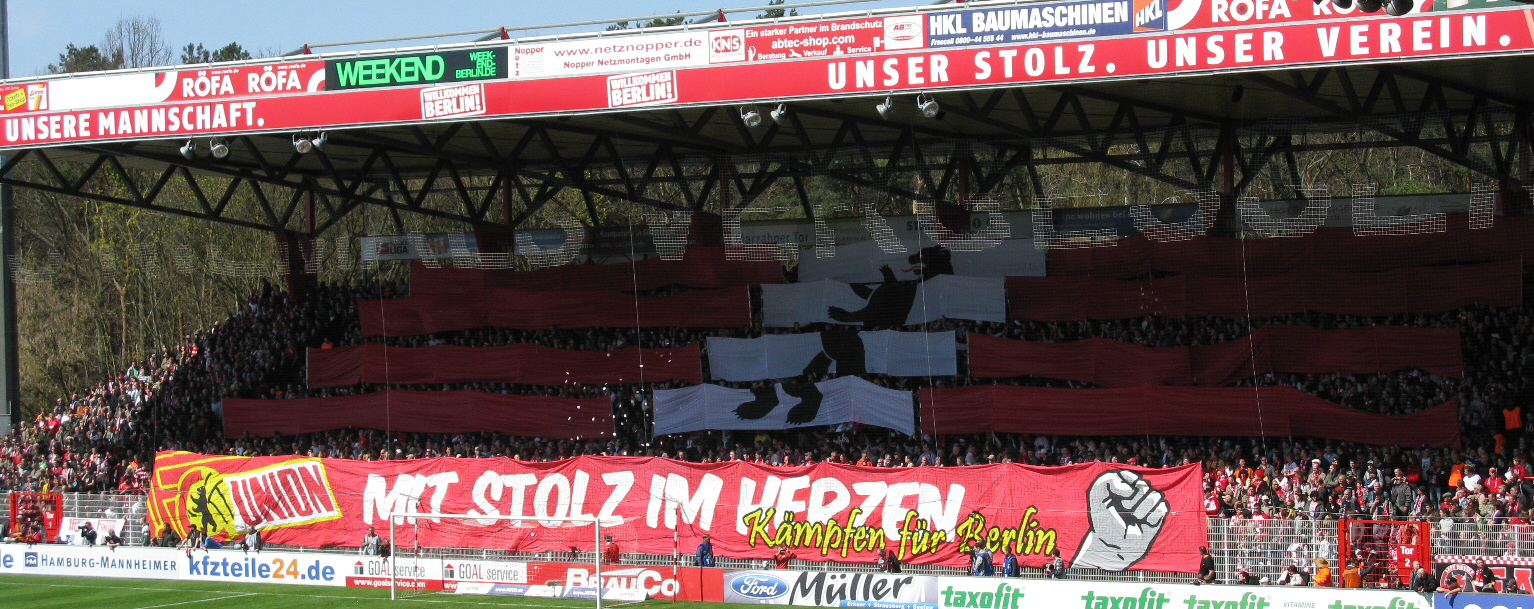
Supporters choreography at a match of 1. FC Union Berlin

Football in Berlin, the capital of Germany, has a long history. The city contributed 24 of the 86 founders of the DFB, the German Football Association. The DFB Cup Final has been held every year at the Olympiastadion since 1985.

The two main football clubs in Berlin are Hertha Berlin and Union Berlin. Hertha BSC, a founder of the DFB, played in the West German system during the Cold War. 1. FC Union Berlin played in the East German system.

The Olympic Stadium hosted the later stages of football at the 1936 Summer Olympics, with the other matches played at smaller grounds in the city. The ground was also a venue in the 1974 FIFA World Cup group containing both West and East Germany. The 2006 FIFA World Cup Final was held at Olympiastadion and saw Italy defeat France on penalties. In 2015 the UEFA Champions League Final was held in Berlin.

== Football culture ==
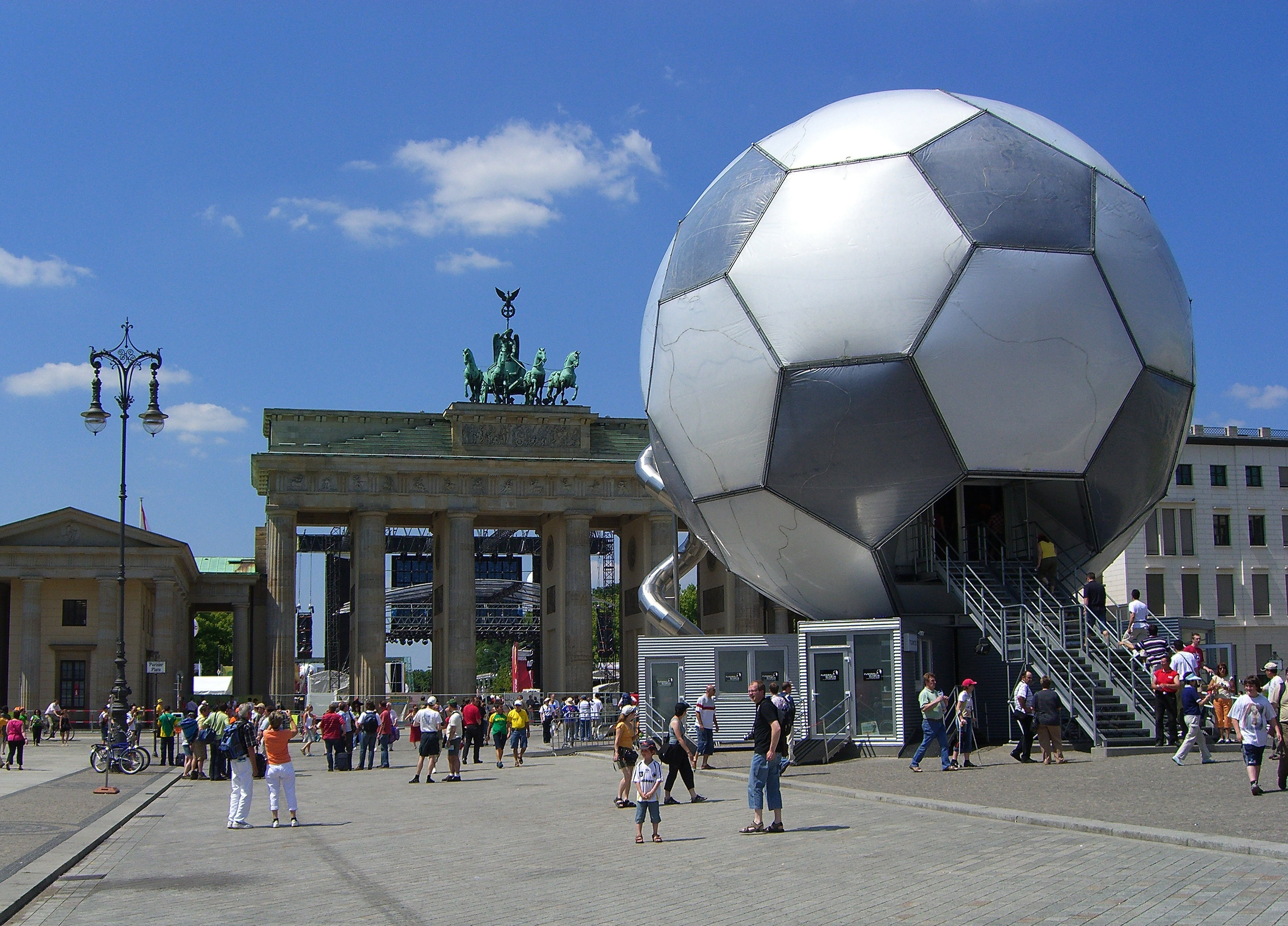
Fan Fest 2006

Open Air gatherings of several hundred thousands spectators have become popular during international football competitions, like the World Cup or the UEFA European Championship. Many fans and viewers come together to watch the matches on huge video screens. The event is known as the Fan Mile and takes place at the Brandenburg Gate every two years.

== Clubs ==
=== Hertha BSC ===
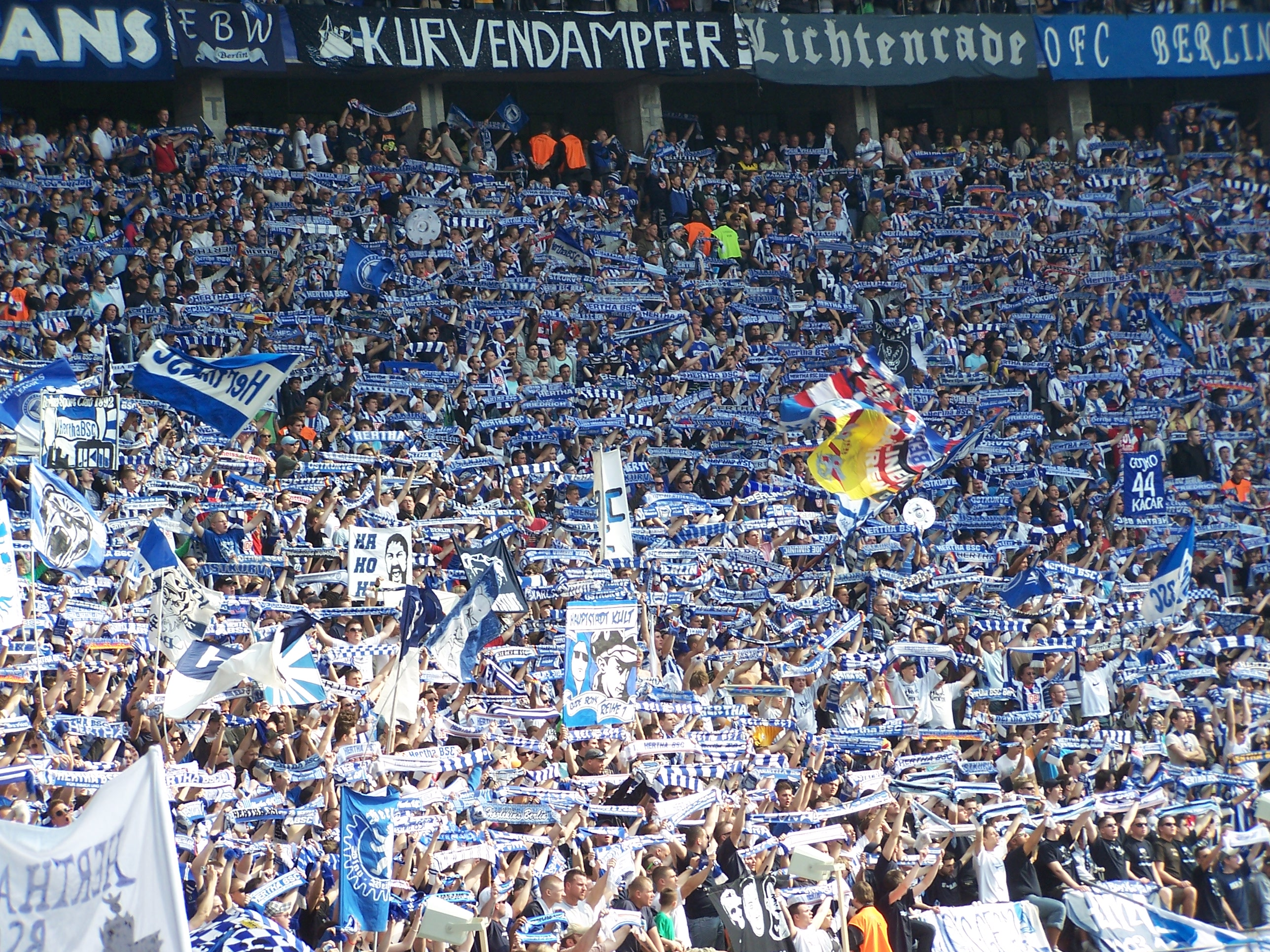
Fans of Hertha BSC in the Olympic Stadium

Hertha BSC were founded on 25 July 1892 and were a founding member of the German Football Association (DFB) in 1900. Hertha won its only two German championships in 1930 and 1931, the latter being the last DFB league title won by a Berlin club. Hertha was the most successful club in the Brandenburg football championship (1892–1933), winning on 12 occasions, including seven consecutive titles between 1925 and 1931 and the last season in 1932-33 before the VBB-Oberliga was abolished by the Nazi regime.

The club was a founder of the German Bundesliga in 1963, but has never won its title. They currently play in the Bundesliga following promotion after finishing champions of the 2. Bundesliga in the 2012–13 season. Hertha are a tenant of the Olympic Stadium.

In 1999–2000, Hertha were Berlin's first-ever representative in the UEFA Champions League, defeating Anorthosis Famagusta of Cyprus to qualify for the First Group Stage, where they advanced at the expense of Italy's AC Milan. In the Second Group Stage they were eliminated after finishing bottom.

=== 1. FC Union Berlin ===
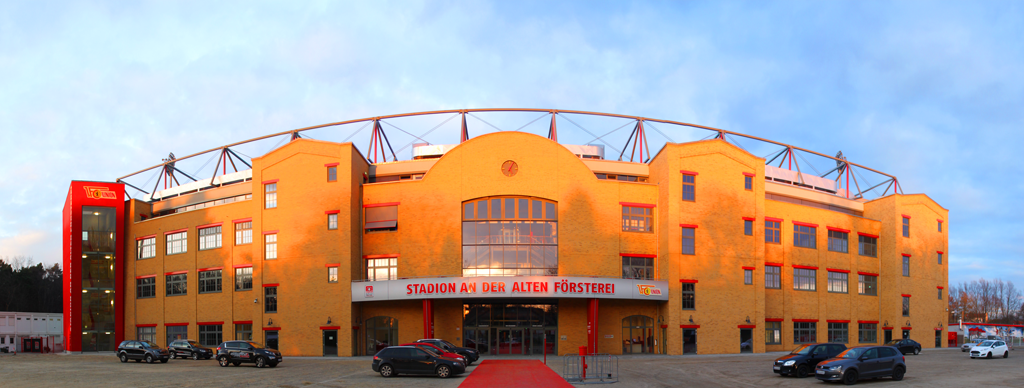
Union Berlin have played at the Stadion An der Alten Försterei since 1920.

FC Olympia Oberschöneweide was established in 1906, from a merger of three smaller local clubs in Oberschöneweide (despite a team of a similar name winning the German title the previous year, Union 92 Berlin). The team were runner-up in the 1923 German football championship, where they lost 0-3 in the final to Hamburger SV.

After World War II the club was temporarily banned, and then re-established as SG Oberschöneweide. Located in the eastern part of Berlin, the club suffered badly from the division of the city. Due to Soviet authorities imposing a travel ban on the club, most players and coaches left for West Berlin in 1950 to form SC Union 06 Berlin. The remaining part carried on as SG Union Oberschöneweide, which was the name of the club since 1948. Following a series of name changes and mergers, the club was re-founded as football club 1. FC Union Berlin in 1966. Despite some early mild success in post-split Germany, Union were relatively unsuccessful in East Germany, frequently changing between the DDR-Oberliga and the second-tier DDR-Liga. Union won the FDGB-Pokal in 1968.

In the 1990s the club was present mostly in regional leagues (third division) and were promoted to 2. Bundesliga in 2001. After three years they were relegated twice to fourth division but won, after being promoted to third division again, 3. Liga in 2009 to reach 2. Bundesliga. Union reached the final of the 2000–01 DFB-Pokal before losing 2–0 in the final in Berlin to Schalke 04. Union were promoted to the Bundesliga for the first time in their history in 2019, following a 2–2 aggregate draw in the Promotion-Relegation Playoff with VfB Stuttgart, which Union won on away goals.

The club plays at Stadion An der Alten Försterei, which the club and its predecessors has occupied since 1920. The stadium has a capacity of 22,012 spectators, for the most part on standing terraces. The venue became also known for events like the annual "Weihnachtssingen" (Christmas Carols Event) and the "WM-Wohnzimmer" (World Cup Living Room) in 2014.

Union Berlin is well known for its fan-base and chant "Eisern Union" (Iron Union). The club is recognized as one of Germany's cult clubs, based on initiatives over the last two decades.

=== BFC Dynamo ===
SC Dynamo Berlin was founded as a sports club in East Berlin in 1954. In order to establish a competitive team in the East German capital, the team of SG Dynamo Dresden was delegated to East Berlin to play for SC Dynamo Berlin. SC Dynamo Berlin won the 1959 FDGB-Pokal, but was overshadowed by ASK Vorwärts Berlin in the 1960s. The team played its home matches at the large Walter-Ulbricht-Stadion during the first seasons. The football department of SC Dynamo Berlin was separated from the sports club in 1966 and re-organized as football club BFC Dynamo.

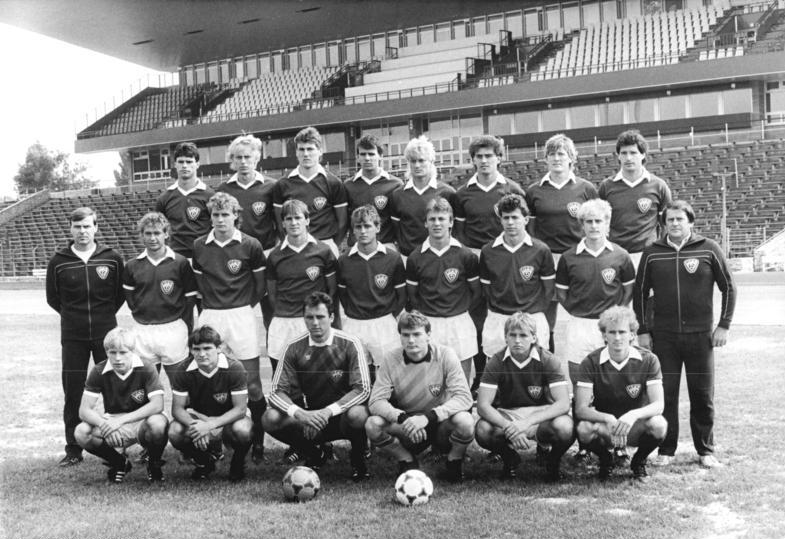
The team of BFC Dynamo at the Friedrich-Ludwig-Jahn-Sportpark on 17 July 1987

BFC Dynamo was developed into a flagship club of sports association SV Dynamo. It had the best material conditions in the league and the best team by far. BFC Dynamo won ten East German championships in succession between 1979 and 1988. It also won the FDGB-Pokal in 1988 and 1989 as well as the DFV-Supercup in 1989. BFC Dynamo is the only club in Berlin to have reached the semi-finals of the most prestigious European club competitions. The club reached the semi-finals of the 1971–72 European Cup Winners' Cup, before losing to Dynamo Moscow in a penalty shoot-out. BFC Dynamo became the first German team to defeat an English team in England in the European Cup when the team defeated Nottingham Forest under Brian Clough at the City Ground in the quarter-finals of the 1979–80 European Cup.

BFC Dynamo put a lot of focus on its youth work. Its successes during the East German era was built on an elaborate youth system. The club was able to recruit young talented players from training centers (TZ) across the whole of East Germany, including numerous training centers (TZ) of SV Dynamo. BFC Dynamo had the youngest team in the league in the 1975-76 DDR-Oberliga season with an average age of only 22,8 years. Most of its top performers of the 1980s came through its own youth teams, such as Andreas Thom, Frank Rohde, Bodo Rudwaleit and Rainer Ernst.

BFC Dynamo was the only first division club in the whole of Berlin when the Berlin Wall opened in 1989. The club was controversial for its connection to the Stasi and was re-branded FC Berlin on 19 February 1990. The club fell on hard times after German reunification and suffered a near bankruptcy in 2001. The club has since recovered and managed to qualify for the Regionalliga Nordost after a successful 2013–14 season. The team subsequently moved back to the stadium of its heyday, the Friedrich-Ludwig-Jahn-Sportpark. BFC Dynamo is based in the locality of Alt-Hohenschönhausen of the borough of Lichtenberg. The Sportforum Hohenschönhausen is considered the spiritual home of the club. BFC Dynamo has youth teams in all age groups and operates an award-winning day care project.

=== FC Viktoria 1889 Berlin ===
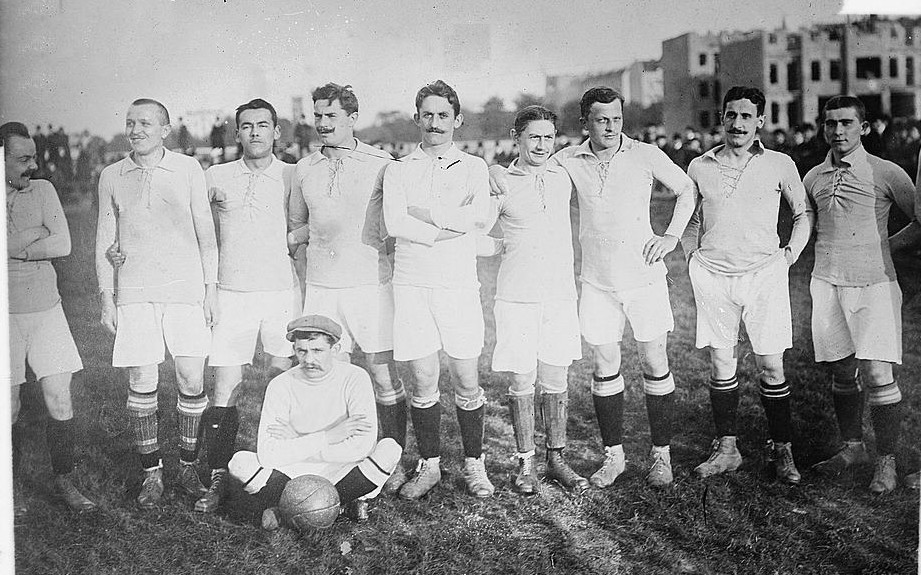
The football team of BFC Viktoria around 1910-1913

BFC Viktoria 1889 was established in 1889 and was a founder of the DFB in 1900. The club emerged as the strongest football club in Berlin at the turn of the century, until World War I, and won two German championships (1907–08 and 1910–11). It was weakened by the division of Berlin during the Cold War, as only one club from West Berlin was permitted entry to the new Bundesliga in 1963, an honour given to Hertha. The club won the 1893–94 German Championship on 28 July 2007, in a two-legged final 113 years after their opponents FC Hanau 93 decided not to travel 400 km to Berlin on the original occasion.

The club announced its plans to merger with Lichterfelder FC in March 2013. The new club competes under the name FC Viktoria 1889 Berlin, and the full name of the new association is Fußballclub Viktoria 1889 Berlin Lichterfelde-Tempelhof e. V. The aim of the merger was to become the third club in the ongoing evolution of Berlin football, behind Hertha BSC and 1. FC Union Berlin. FC Viktoria 1889 Berlin qualified for the Regionalliga Nordost after the 2012-13 season. The club then qualified for the 3. Liga after a successful 2020-21 season. The club led 2020-21 Regionalliga Nordost when the season ended prematurely after eleven rounds played due to the COVID-19 pandemic. The team had won all eleven matches played during the short season.

=== Tennis Borussia Berlin ===
Tennis Borussia Berlin was founded in 1902 as Berliner Tennis- und Ping-Pong-Gesellschaft Borussia taking its name from its origins as a tennis and ping-pong club. Borussia is a Latinised version of Prussia and was a widely used name for sports clubs in the former state of Prussia. The club took up football in 1903 and quickly developed a rivalry with Berlin's leading side Hertha BSC.

After World War II and into the early 1950s, TeBe emerged as Berlin's top side but were unable to keep up their form and earn selection to the Germany's new professional league, the Bundesliga, formed in 1963. The team played in tier II leagues throughout the 60s and 70s with the exception of two short-lived forays into the Bundesliga in 1974–75 and 1976–77. Most of the 1980s were spent playing in the third tier Oberliga Berlin.

Through most of its history TeBe has been afflicted by financial problems but has always managed to hang on while many other of Berlin's clubs folded or disappeared in mergers.

Finally, in 2000, the club had adopted its current name "Tennis Borussia Berlin", as the club had always been known under this moniker and to avoid being mistaken as a tennis club.

=== Ethnic clubs ===
Berlin's oldest Jewish football club, Bar Kochba Berlin, founded in 1898, merged with another, Hakoah Berlin in 1930 to form Bar Kochba-Hakoah. Under the Nazi regime, Jewish clubs were segregated in 1933 and dissolved in 1938. Jewish clubs competed in other sports from the end of the war, but it was not until 1970 that Bar Kochba-Hakoah were revived as a football club, as a member of the Maccabi World Union which encourages Jewish sport. Now competing as TuS Makkabi Berlin in the sixth-tier Berlin-Liga, the club made headlines in Germany and the Jewish State of Israel in October 2006. Despite the club's low profile and the increase in tolerance in German society, the club were subjected to anti-Semitic, Neo-Nazi chants from fans and players of VSG Altglienicke.

Türkiyemspor Berlin is another sixth-tier Berlin-Liga club, founded in 1978 and composed of Germans of Turkish descent. In 2010-11, it was relegated from the fourth-tier Regionalliga Nord. The name Turkiyemspor is used by other Turkish-centred clubs in Germany and abroad. Former Turkish international Ümit Karan began his career at the club. SV Yeşilyurt, another club founded by immigrants from İzmir and Istanbul, was founded in 1973 and wound up in 2007 when it merged with Berliner AK 07. AK, despite being founded in 1907, have merged with various Turkish-centred clubs in its history and since 2006 has been in partnership with the Turkish club Ankaraspor, taking on their name and colours for the 2006-07 season.

FC Polonia Berlin is a football club founded by Poles living in Berlin and Germans of Polish descent. The club was founded in 2012 and refers to the heritage of the Polski Klub Sportowy Berlin (PSK Berlin). PKS Berlin was founded in 1911. The team found itself in the Soviet sector of Berlin after World War II. The team played as PKS Zryw Berlin in the 1950-51 Landesliga Berlin. The club was then joined with sports community BSG Empor Nord Berlin in 1951. BSG Empor Nord Berlin was founded as BSG Handelsorganisation Berlin (BSG HO Berlin) in 1949. BSG HO Berlin then became affiliated to the new sports association SV Empor in 1951 and renamed BSG Empor Nord Berlin. The team played as BSG Empor HO Berlin from 1974. The team reached the third tier of the East German football league system. Polonia Berlin plays in Kreisliga C (eleventh-tier). The name Polonia is used by other Polish-centred clubs in Germany (for example Polonia Hamburg) and abroad.

SD Croatia Berlin, of the eighth-tier Berlin Bezirksliga Division 1, was founded in 1972 for the city's Croatian community. Its futsal club won the DFB Futsal Cup in 2010 and 2011.

== List of current clubs ==
=== Men's football ===
As of the 2020–21 season.

Club	Club founded	League	Level	Home Ground	Capacity
1. FC Union Berlin	1966 (Note: The history of 1. FC Union Berlin begins with football club FC Olympia Oberschöneweide, founded in 1906.)	Bundesliga	1	Stadion An der Alten Försterei	22,012
Hertha BSC	1892	2.Bundesliga	2	Olympiastadion	74,475
BFC Dynamo	1966 (Note: BFC Dynamo originally began as a football department of SC Dynamo Berlin, founded in 1954.)	Regionalliga Nordost	4	Stadion im Sportforum	4,500
FC Viktoria 1889 Berlin	1889	Regionalliga Nordost	4	Stadion Lichterfelde	4,300
Berliner AK 07	1907	Regionalliga Nordost	4	Poststadion	10,000
VSG Altglienicke	1946 (Note: The history of VSG Altglienicke can be traced to sports association MTV Spieß, founded in 1883.)	Regionalliga Nordost	4	Stadion auf dem Wurfplatz (Note: The Stadion auf dem Wurfplatz is also known as the Olympipark-Amateurstadion.)	5,400
SV Lichtenberg 47	1947	Regionalliga Nordost	4	Hans-Zoschke-Stadion	10,000
Tennis Borussia Berlin	1902	Regionalliga Nordost	4	Mommsenstadion	11,500
SpVg Blau-Weiß 90 Berlin	1992 (Note: SpVg Blau-Weiß 90 Berlin is the successor club of Blau-Weiß 1890 Berlin, founded in 1890.)	NOFV-Oberliga Nord	5	Sportplatz an der Rathausstraße (Union-Platz)	3,000
SV Tasmania Berlin	1973 (Note: SV Tasmania Berlin is the successor club of SC Tasmania 1900 Berlin, founded in 1900.)	NOFV-Oberliga Nord	5	Sportpark Neukölln	3,500
FC Hertha 03 Zehlendorf	1903	NOFV-Oberliga Nord	5	Ernst-Reuter-Sportanlage	4,000
CFC Hertha 06	1903	NOFV-Oberliga Nord	5	Sportplatz Sömmeringstraße	3,000
SC Staaken	1919	NOFV-Oberliga Nord	5	Sportpark Staaken	1,500
SFC Stern 1900	1900	NOFV-Oberliga Nord	5	Sportplatz Schildhornstraße	1,000
SV Sparta Lichtenberg	1911	Berlin-Liga	6	Sportplatz Fischerstraße	1,000
Berliner Sport-Club	1892	Berlin-Liga	6	Hubertussportplatz	3,000
SC Charlottenburg	1898	Berlin-Liga	6	Mommsenstadion	15,005
TuS Makkabi Berlin	1970 (Note: TuS Makkabi Berlin was founded in continuation of the tradition of jewish sports association Bar Kochba Berlin, founded in 1898.)	Berlin-Liga	6	Julius-Hirsch-Sportanlage	1,000
SV Empor Berlin	1949	Berlin-Liga	6	Friedrich-Ludwig-Jahn-Sportpark	19,708
SD Croatia Berlin	1972	Berlin-Liga	6	Friedrich-Ebert-Stadion	4,500
Türkiyemspor Berlin	1978	Berlin-Liga	6	Willy-Kressmann-Stadion	5,000
BSV Al-Dersimspor	1993	Berlin-Liga	6	Laskersportplatz	2,000
FC Brandenburg 03	1903	Berlin-Liga	6	Sportplatz Sömmeringstraße	3,000
Berlin Türkspor	1965	Berlin-Liga	6	Sportplatz Heckerdamm	-
BFC Preussen	1894	Landesliga, Staffel 1	7	Preussen-Stadion Malteserstraße	3,000
FSV Berolina Stralau	1901	Landesliga, Staffel 1	7	Lasker-Sportplatz	4,000
TSV Mariendorf 1897	1897	Landesliga, Staffel 1	7	Volkspark Mariendorf	10,000
Spandauer SC Teutonia 99	1899	Landesliga, Staffel 1	7	Stadion Hakenfelde	1,500
FC Spandau 06	2003 (Note: FC Spandau 06 was formed from a merger of several local clubs, among them, Spandauer BC 06, which was the continuation of SC Britannia 06 Spandau, founded in 1906.)	Landesliga, Staffel 2	7	Stadion am Ziegelhof (Sportplatz Ziegelhof)	3,000
BFC Meteor 06	1906	Landesliga, Staffel 2	7	Hanne-Sobek-Sportanlage	3,000
1. FC Lübars 1962	1962	Landesliga, Staffel 2	7	Sportplatz Schluchseestraße	500
SV Stern Britz 1889	1889	Landesliga, Staffel 2	7	Stadion am Buckower Damm	5,000
Berliner SV 1892	1892	Bezirksliga, Staffel 1	8	Stadion-Wilmersdorf	2,500
NSF Gropiusstadt	1907	Bezirksliga, Staffel 1	8	Silbersteinsportplatz	-
SV Blau-Weiß Hohen Neuendorf	1920	Bezirksliga, Staffel 2	8	Sportplatz Niederheide	2,000
FK Srbija Berlin	2008	Bezirksliga, Staffel 2	8	Stadion Neuendorfer Straße	2,500
BSC Marzahn	1985	Bezirksliga, Staffel 3	8	Sportanlage Schönagelstraße	1,000
SC Union 06 Berlin	1950 (Note: SC Union 06 Berlin share a common origin with 1. FC Union Berlin, in football club FC Olympia 06 Oberschöneweide, founded in 1906.)	Bezirksliga, Staffel 3	8	Poststadion	10,000
FV Wannsee	1896	Kreisliga A, Staffel 2	9	Stadion Wannsee	5,000
SV Nord Wedding 1893	1893	Kreisliga A, Staffel 1	9	Sportanlage Kühnemannstraße (Werner-Kluge-Sportplatz)	2,000
BSC Kickers 1900	1900	Kreisliga A, Staffel 3	8	Sportplatz Monumentenstraße	2,000
Friedrichshagener SV 1912	1912	Kreisliga A, Staffel 3	9	Sportanlage Friedrichshagen (Sportplatz am Wasserwerk)	2,500
Berliner TSC	1963 (Note: The football department of TSC Berlin was separated from the sports club in 1966 and reorganized as football club 1. FC Union Berlin. The sports club created a new football department after German reunification.)	Kreisliga A, Staffel 4	9	Sportanlage Paul-Heyse-Straße (Sportplatz Paul-Heyse-Straße)	-
FC Polonia Berlin	2012	Kreisliga A, Staffel 4	9	Polonia Park (Sportplatz Ollenhauerstraße)	-
Berliner FC Alemannia 1890	1890	Kreisliga B, Staffel 4	10	Sportanlage Kienhorstpark	7,000
SC Minerva 93	1893	Kreisliga B, Staffel 6	10	Chausseestraße	5,000
BFC Germania 1888	1888	Kreisliga B, Staffel 5	10	Sportplatz an der Götzstraße	1,000

=== Women's football ===
As of the 2020–21 season.

Club	Women's team formed	League	Level	Home Ground	Capacity
1. FC Union Berlin	1990	Frauen-Regionalliga Nordost, Staffel Nord	3	Fritz-Lesch-Sportanlage	3,000
FC Viktoria 1889 Berlin	1975 (Note: The team was originally formed by FV Brandenburg-Lichterfelde, later Lichterfelder FC 1892 Berlin.)	Frauen-Regionalliga Nordost, Staffel Nord	3	Stadion Lichterfelde	4,300
SV Blau-Weiß Hohen Neuendorf	2001	Frauen-Regionalliga Nordost, Staffel Nord	3	Sportplatz Niederheide	2,000
SFC Stern 1900	2003	Frauen-Regionalliga Nordost, Staffel Nord	3	Sportplatz Schildhornstraße	300
Türkiyemspor Berlin	2009	Frauen-Regionalliga Nordost, Staffel Nord	3	Willi-Kressmann-Stadion	5,000
SC Staaken	2003	Frauen Berlin-Liga	4	Sportpark Staaken	1,500
SV Lichtenberg 47	1971	Frauen Berlin-Liga	4	Sportplatz Bornitzstraße	-
SpVg Blau-Weiß 90 Berlin	2008	Frauen Berlin-Liga	4	Sportplatz an der Rathausstraße (Union-Platz)	3,000
FC Hertha 03 Zehlendorf	2001	Frauen Berlin-Liga	4	Ernst-Reuter-Sportfeld	4,500

== In Bundesliga ==
As of the 2022–23 Bundesliga season

Club	Seasons
Hertha BSC	1963–64 – 1964–65, 1968–69 – 1979–80, 1982–83, 1990–91, 1997–98 – 2009–10; 2011–12, 2013–14 – 2022–23
Tennis Borussia Berlin	1974–75, 1976–77
Blau-Weiß 1890 Berlin	1986–87
Union Berlin	2019–20–

== Berlin derbies ==
- East-West Berlin derby: 1. FC Union Berlin vs. Hertha BSC
- East Berlin derby: 1. FC Union Berlin vs. BFC Dynamo

The first Berlin derby in the Bundesliga took place between Hertha BSC and Tennis Borussia Berlin at the Olympiastadion on 16 November 1974.

Currently, the main Berlin derby is between Hertha BSC and 1. FC Union Berlin. In the 2019–20 Bundesliga, Hertha BSC and 1. FC Union Berlin disputed the first Bundesliga meeting between the two teams, occurred on 3 November 2019.

== Major competitions ==
=== 1936 Summer Olympic Games ===
Football at the 1936 Summer Olympics in Berlin saw group games and quarter-finals held at three venues in the capital: the Poststadion, the Mommsenstadion and the Stadion am Gesundbrunnen (home to Hertha between 1924 and 1974). All games after the quarter-finals were held at the Olympic Stadium, and Italy beat Austria 2-1 in the final on 15 August.

=== 1974 FIFA World Cup Group A ===
Group A at the 1974 FIFA World Cup featured three matches at Berlin's Olympic Stadium, all involving Chile, against West Germany, East Germany and Australia. West Germany won 1-0, although the other matches were draws. The infamous match between the two German teams, however, was played in Hamburg.

=== 2006 FIFA World Cup Final ===
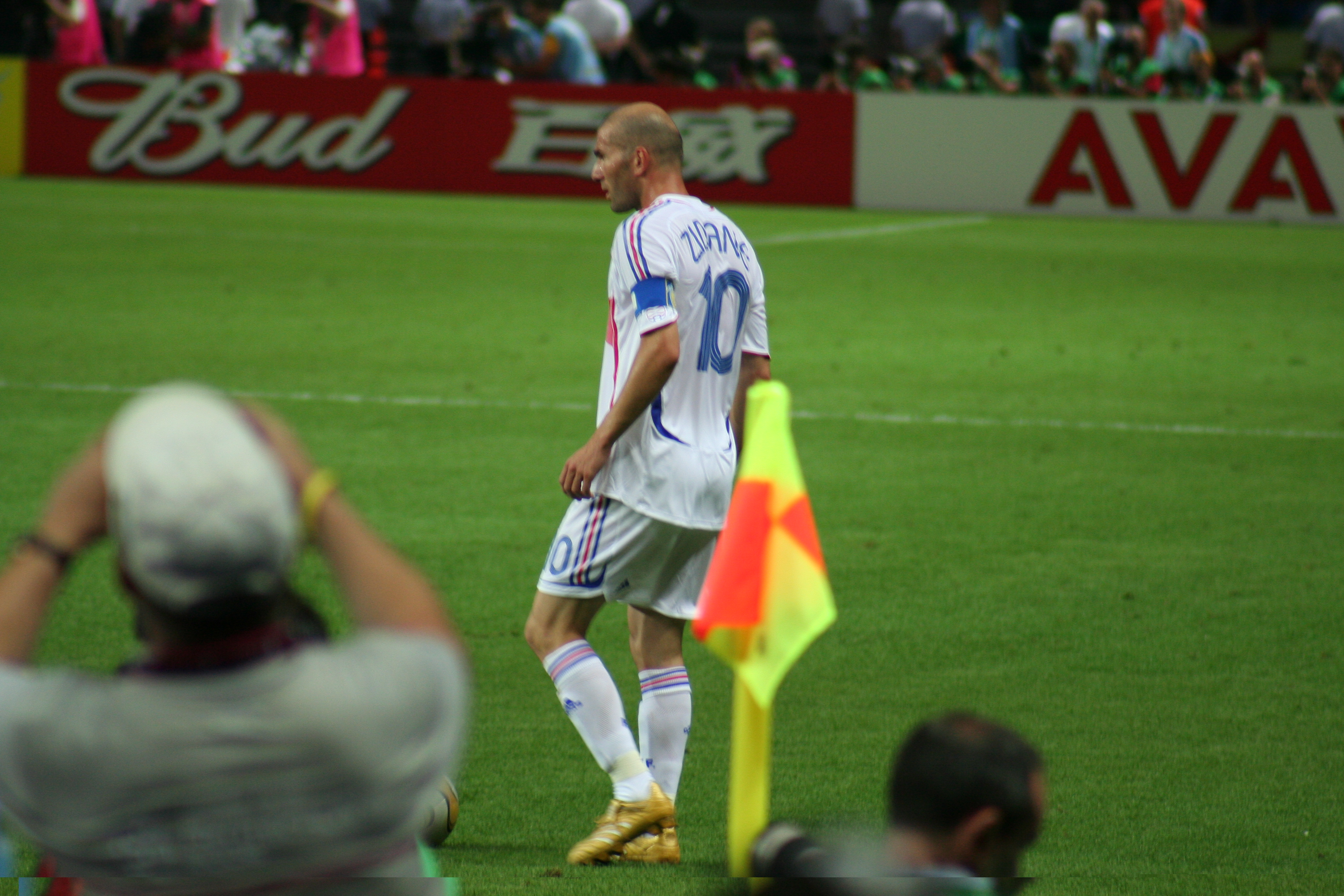
Zinedine Zidane at the 2006 FIFA World Cup Final in Berlin

The 2006 FIFA World Cup Final was held on 9 July 2006 at Berlin's Olympiastadion to determine the winner of the 2006 FIFA World Cup. Italy beat France in a shootout after the match finished 1–1 after extra time. France's Zinedine Zidane was sent off in his last-ever match, for headbutting Italy's Marco Materazzi's chest in retaliation to verbal insults.

According to FIFA, 715.1 million individuals globally watched the final match of this tournament. IPG's independent media agency Initiative Worldwide estimated a 260 million people viewership. The independent firm Initiative Futures Sport + Entertainment estimates it at 322 million viewers.

=== 2015 UEFA Champions League Finals ===
In May 2013, the Olympiastadion was chosen as the venue for the 2015 UEFA Champions League Final. In July 2014, it was announced that Berlin would also be the host for the 2015 UEFA Women's Champions League Final. The women's final was played at the Friedrich-Ludwig-Jahn-Sportpark.

The 2015 UEFA Champions League Final was the final match of the 2014–15 UEFA Champions League, the 60th season of Europe's premier club football tournament organised by UEFA, and the 23rd season since it was renamed from the European Champion Clubs' Cup to the UEFA Champions League. It was played on 6 June 2015, between Italian side Juventus and Spanish side Barcelona. Barcelona were the winners, beating Juventus 3–1 to gain their fifth trophy in the competition.

The 2015 UEFA Women's Champions League Final was played on 14 May 2015. Unlike recent years in which the Women's Champions League final was held in the same week as the men's Champions League final, the two finals were separated by almost a month. German side 1. FFC Frankfurt defeated French side Paris 2–1 in the final to win a record fourth title.

== See also ==
- Sport in Berlin
- Berlin Football Association
- Football in Munich
- Football in Germany
- Brandenburg football championship
