= Football in Munich =

Munich is home to a number of football clubs, and has hosted games in two FIFA World Cups, including West Germany's victory in the 1974 FIFA World Cup final.

== Clubs ==
FC Bayern Munich have won a record 33 national championships, along with 20 German Cups, 6 League Cups, 10 DFL-Supercups, 6 UEFA Champions League/European Cups, 1 UEFA Cup, 1 UEFA Cup Winners' Cup, 2 UEFA Super Cups, 2 Intercontinental Cups and 2 FIFA Club World Cups for a total of 83 trophies.

TSV 1860 Munich contest the Munich derby with Bayern and have won 1 National Championship along with 2 DFB Cups. 1860 and Bayern both played in the city's Olympiastadion before moving to the 75,000 capacity Allianz Arena in 2005. Bayern Munich's reserve team, Bayern II, won the 2019–20 3. Liga but were denied promotion to the 2. Bundesliga as reserve teams are not allowed to play in the top two tiers of German football.

Other clubs in the city include, SpVgg Helios München, Türkgücü München, FC Wacker München, BSC Sendling. Türkgücü München secured promotion to the 3. Liga for the first time in their history in 2020. As of the 2020–21 season, there are three Munich clubs in Germany's third tier (Bayern II, 1860 and Türkgücü).

== List of current clubs ==
=== Men's football ===
As of the beginning of the 2023–24 season.

Club	Club founded	League	Level	Home Ground	Capacity
TSV 1860 Munich	1860	3. Liga	3	Grünwalder Stadion	15,000
FC Bayern Munich	1900	Bundesliga	1	Allianz Arena	75,000
Türkgücü München	1975	Regionalliga	4	Grünwalder Stadion	15,000

=== Women's football ===
As of the beginning of the 2023–24 season.

Club	Women's team formed	League	Level	Home Ground	Capacity
FC Bayern Munich (women)	1970	Frauen-Bundesliga	1	FC Bayern Campus	2,500

== Munich derbies ==
The Munich derby (German: Münchner Stadtderby) is the name given to football matches between FC Bayern Munich and TSV 1860 Munich, both of them from Munich, Germany.

== Major competitions ==
=== 1974 FIFA World Cup ===
The Munich Olympic Stadium (Olympiastadion) was the site of the final match of the 1974 FIFA World Cup between the sides of Netherlands and Germany finishing 2–1 to the host nation.

=== 2006 FIFA World Cup ===
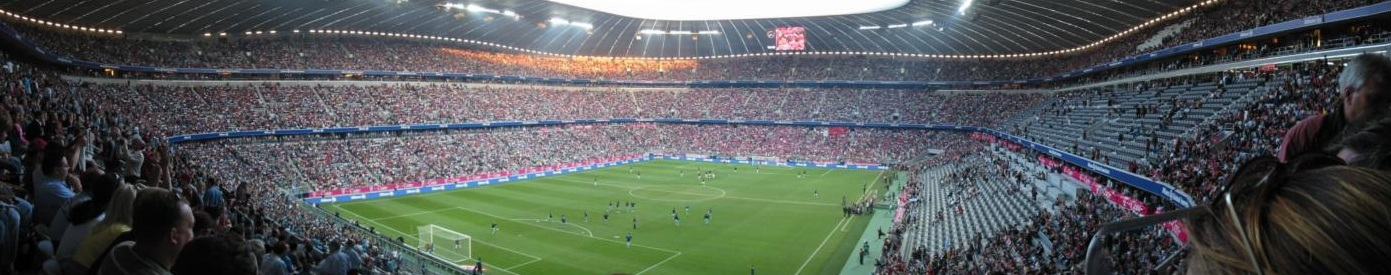
Inside Allianz Arena

Munich was one of the cities named for the 2006 FIFA World Cup. Allianz Arena was built to host the matches played in Munich instead of Olympic Stadium.

The following games were played at the stadium during the World Cup of 2006:

Date	Time (CEST)	Team #1	Result	Team #2	Round	Attendance
9 June 2006	18:00	Germany	4–2	Costa Rica	Group A (opening match)	66,000
14 June 2006	18:00	Tunisia	2–2	Saudi Arabia	Group H	66,000
18 June 2006	18:00	Brazil	2–0	Australia	Group F	66,000
21 June 2006	21:00	Ivory Coast	3–2	Serbia and Montenegro	Group C	66,000
24 June 2006	17:00	Germany	2–0	Sweden	Round of 16	66,000
5 July 2006	21:00	Portugal	0–1	France	Semi-finals	66,000

=== UEFA Euro 1988 ===
The 1988 UEFA European Football Championship final tournament was held in West Germany. It was the eighth European Football Championship, which is held every four years and supported by UEFA. The final tournament took place between 10 and 25 June 1988 with Munich hosting the final in the Olympiastadion. The tournament eventually crowned Netherlands as European champions for the first, and so far only time with Marco van Basten's iconic goal sealing a famous 2–0 win for the Dutch against the Soviet Union.

Euro 88 was a rare occurrence of a major football tournament being completed without a single player being sent off, any knockout matches going into extra time or penalties and having at least one goal scored in every match.

=== UEFA Euro 2024 ===
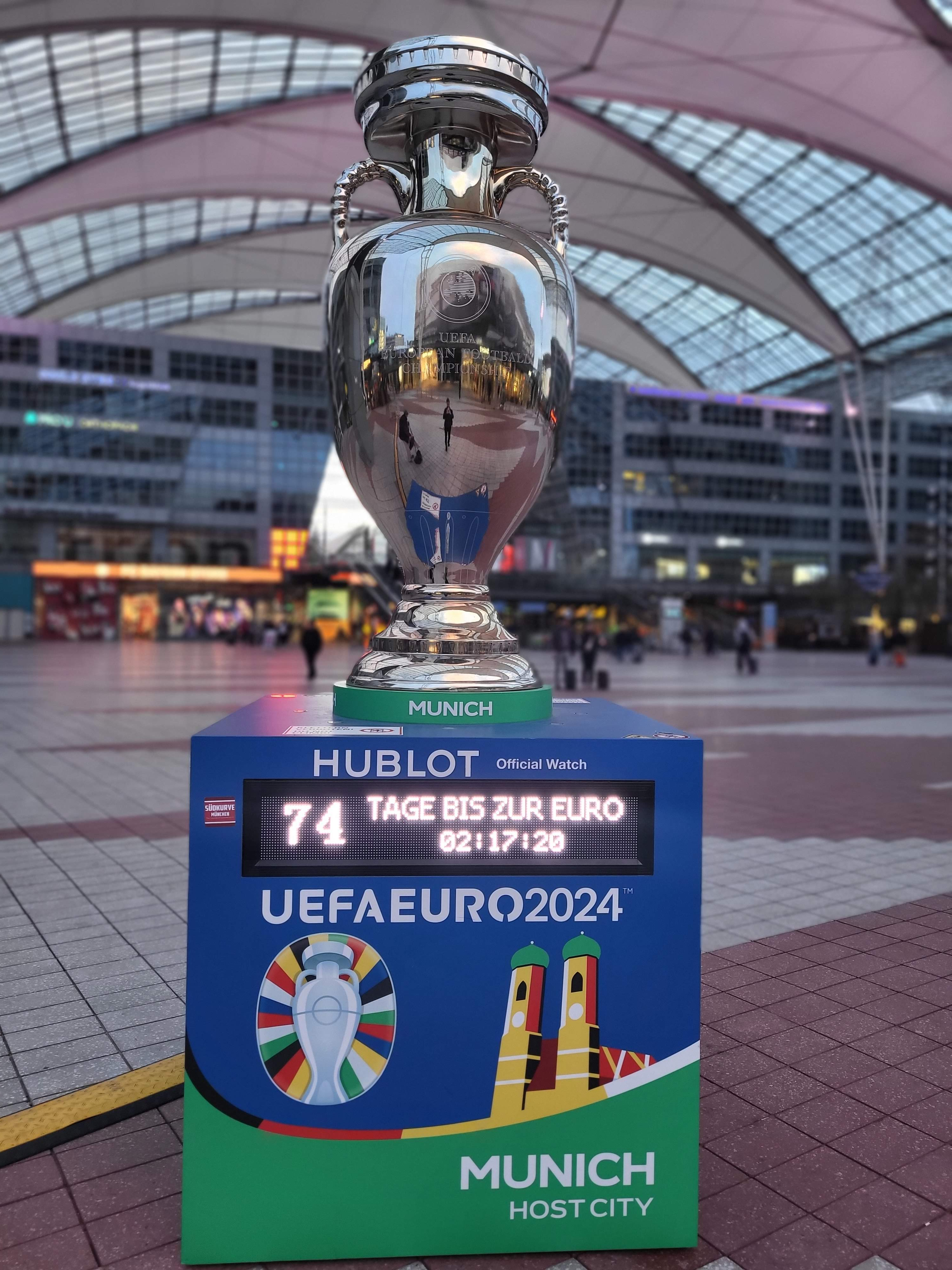
Countdown clock for UEFA Euro 2024 in front of Munich Airport

Munich was one of the cities named for the UEFA Euro 2024. The Allianz Arena is down to host four group stage matches, including the opening game, one match in the round of 16 and one semi-finals match.

Date	Time	Team #1	Result	Team #2	Round	Attendance
14 June 2024	21:00	Germany	5–1	Scotland	Group A (opening match)	65,052
17 June 2024	15:00	Romania	3–0	Ukraine	Group E	61,591
20 June 2024	15:00	Slovenia	1–1	Serbia	Group C	63,028
25 June 2024	21:00	Denmark	0–0	Serbia	Group C	64,288
2 July 2024	18:00	Romania	0–3	Netherlands	Round of 16	65,012
9 July 2024	21:00	Spain	2–1	France	Semi-finals	62,042

=== European club competition finals ===
==== UEFA Champions League/European Champions Cup Finals ====
===== Won by Bayern Munich =====
Bayern Munich have won six European Cups, including three straight titles in the mid-1970s, one each in 2001 and 2013 and, most recently, in 2020.

===== Held in Munich =====
====== 1979 European Cup Final ======
The 1979 European Cup Final was a football match held in Olympiastadion on 30 May 1979, that saw Nottingham Forest of England defeat Malmö FF of Sweden 1–0.

====== 1993 UEFA Champions League Final ======
The 1993 UEFA Champions League Final was a football match between French club Marseille and Italy's Milan, played on 26 May 1993 in Olympiastadion. Marseille won the match 1–0.

====== 1997 UEFA Champions League Final ======
The 1997 UEFA Champions League Final was a football match played between Borussia Dortmund of Germany and Juventus from Italy. The event took place in Olympiastadion on 28 May 1997. Borussia Dortmund wore their traditional yellow and black shirts, while Juventus donned their blue away kit. Dortmud won the match 3–1.

====== 2012 UEFA Champions League Final ======
The 2012 UEFA Champions League Final was the final match of the 2011–12 UEFA Champions League, the 57th season of the UEFA Champions League football tournament and the 20th since it was renamed from the European Champion Clubs' Cup. The match was played at the Allianz Arena and won by Chelsea, who beat Bayern Munich on penalties after extra time.

== Famous footballers from Munich ==
- Markus Babbel
- Franz Beckenbauer
- Ludwig Goldbrunner
- Peter Grosser
- Hans Jakob
- Adolf Kunstwadl
- Philipp Lahm
- Hans-Georg Schwarzenbeck
- Sandro Wagner

== See also ==
- Sport in Munich
- Football in Germany
- Football in Berlin
