= Yan Morhovskyi =

Ukrainian footballer

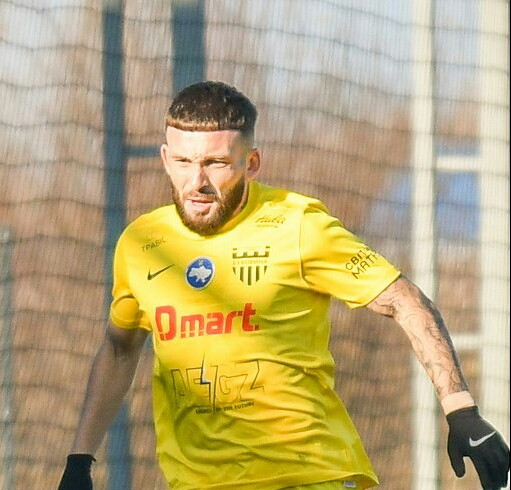

Personal information
- Full name: Yan Petrovych Morhovskyi
- Date of birth: 20 September 1998 (age 28)
- Place of birth: Zoriane, Zhytomyr Oblast, Ukraine
- Height: 1.69 m (5 ft 7 in)
- Position: Left-back

Youth career
- 2014–2018: Podillya Khmelnytskyi

Senior career*
Years	Team	Apps	(Gls)
2015	Podillya-DYuSSh-1 Khmelnytskyi	4	(2)
2016–2022	Podillya Khmelnytskyi	147	(10)
2022–2023	Polissya Zhytomyr	13	(0)
2023–2024	Zviahel	16	(3)
2024–2026	Bukovyna Chernivtsi	44	(0)
- * Club domestic league appearances and goals as of 3 June 2026

Yan Petrovych Morhovskyi (Ukrainian: Ян Петрович Морговський; born 20 September 1998) is a Ukrainian professional footballer who plays as a left-back.

== Brief biography ==
Morhovskyi was born in Ruzhyn. He is a graduate of the Podillya football academy. His first coach was Vitaliy Balytskyi.
