= Pollonia, Milos =

Village in Milos, Greece

Pollonia Πολλώνια
- Settlement
- Location within Greece
- Coordinates: 36°45′45″N 24°31′32″E
- Country: Greece
- Administrative region: South Aegean
- Regional unit: Milos
- Municipality: Milos
- Community: Triovasalos

Population (2021)
  - Total: 268
- Time zone: UTC+2 (EET)
  - Summer (DST): UTC+3 (EEST)

Pollonia or Apollonia is a seaside village in the north-eastern part of the island of Milos, Greece. It is the second harbour of Milos island after Adamantas and it has taken its name from the temple of Apollo that existed to the east of the settlement. There is a regular connection from the village to the neighbouring island of Kimolos with a small boat. The main beach of Pollonia is sandy and popular to tourists, while there are two more beaches near the village: "Polychroni's beach" and "Piso thalassa" (translating to "Back sea").

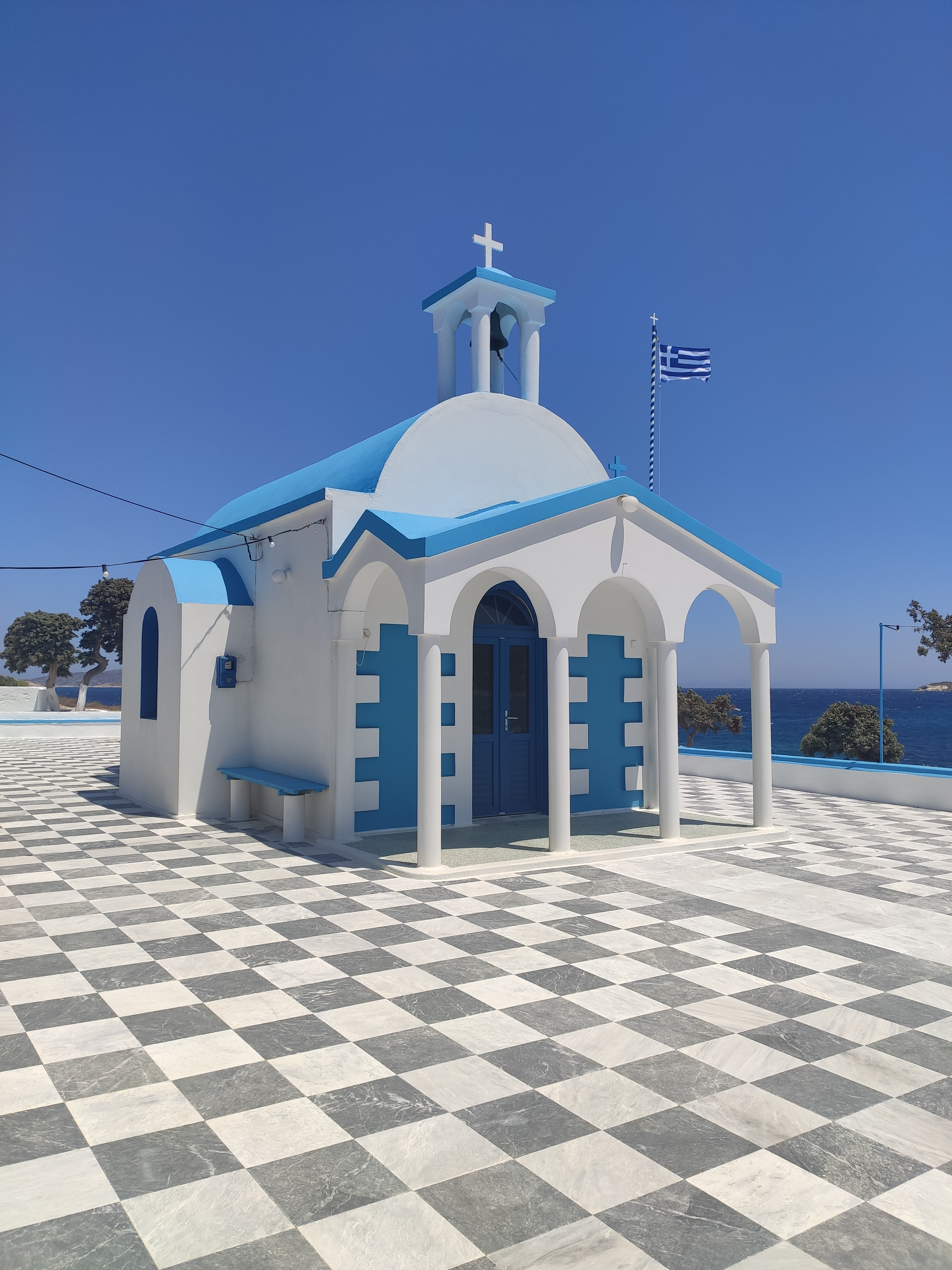
Saint Nicholas Holy Orthodox Chapel

In 1940, the village was included in the (then) community of Pera Triovasalos. According to Kallikratis plan it belongs to the community of Triovasalos of Milos municipality. It had 268 inhabitants as of the 2021 Greek census.
