= Poloniny =

Poloniny may refer to:

- 22469 Poloniny, an asteroid, discovered in 1997
- Poloniny National Park, in northeastern Slovakia
- Poloniny Dark-Sky Park, first dark sky park in Slovakia.
- Połoniny, Warmian-Masurian Voivodeship, a place in Poland
- Poloniny, a variant name for the Polonynian Mountains

== See also ==
- Polonyna (disambiguation)
- Polonia (disambiguation)
