= Sport in Munich =

Sports in the German city of Munich

== Sports clubs ==
Munich is home to several professional sports teams, including Germany's most popular football club, FC Bayern. Furthermore, the city is home to FC Bayern's professional basketball team and professional hockey team EHC Red Bull München. The Munich area currently has one team in the Bundesliga system, which comprises the two top divisions of German football.

| Club | Sport | Founded | League | Venue |
|---|---|---|---|---|
| FC Bayern Munich | Football | 1900 | Bundesliga | Allianz Arena |
| FC Bayern Munich (basketball) | Basketball | 1946 | Basketball Bundesliga | Audi Dome |
| EHC Red Bull München | Ice hockey | 1998 | Deutsche Eishockey Liga | Olympia Eishalle |
| TSV 1860 Munich | Football | 1860/1899 | 3. Liga | Grünwalder Stadion |
| SpVgg Unterhaching | Football | 1925 | 3. Liga | Sportpark Unterhaching |

== Football ==
Munich is the most successful city in Bundesliga history. SpVgg Unterhaching joined FC Bayern Munich and TSV 1860 Munich in the 2000–01 season, making this Bundesliga season the only one in history where one city was represented by three teams. The success of Munich in German football doesn't stop there; Bayern has won 30 national championships, along with 20 DFB-Pokale, 6 UEFA Champions League/European Cups, 8 DFL-Supercups, 6 DFL-Ligapokale, 1 UEFA Cup, 1 UEFA Cup Winners' Cup, 2 UEFA Super Cups, 2 Intercontinental Cups and 2 FIFA Club World Cups, for a total of 78 trophies. 1860 Munich has won 1 national championship along with 2 DFB-Pokale, leaving the city of Munich with 81 total trophies.

=== 2006 FIFA World Cup ===
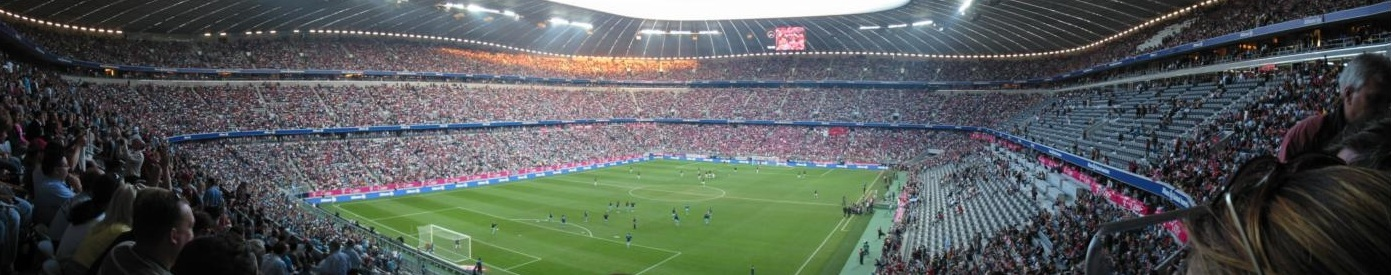
Inside Allianz Arena

Munich was one of the cities named for the 2006 FIFA World Cup. Allianz Arena was built to host the matches played in Munich instead of Olympic Stadium.

The following games were played at the stadium during the tournament:

| Date | Time (CET) | Team #1 | Score | Team #2 | Round | Spectators |
|---|---|---|---|---|---|---|
| 9 June 2006 | 18:00 | Germany | 4–2 | Costa Rica | Group A (opening match) | 66,000 |
| 14 June 2006 | 18:00 | Tunisia | 2–2 | Saudi Arabia | Group H | 66,000 |
| 18 June 2006 | 18:00 | Brazil | 2–0 | Australia | Group F | 66,000 |
| 21 June 2006 | 21:00 | Ivory Coast | 3–2 | Serbia and Montenegro | Group C | 66,000 |
| 24 June 2006 | 17:00 | Germany | 2–0 | Sweden | Round of 16 | 66,000 |
| 5 July 2006 | 21:00 | Portugal | 0–1 | France | Semi-finals | 66,000 |

=== 2020 UEFA European Championship ===
Munich hosted three group-stage games and a quarterfinal in the intercontinental Euro 2020. This included all three of Germany's games in the group stage.

=== 2024 UEFA European Championship ===
Munich hosted the opening game of Euro 2024, with Germany beating Scotland 5-1. It also hosted 3 more group games, one in the Round of 16, and a semifinal.

== Olympics ==
=== 1972 Summer Olympics ===
Munich held the 1972 Summer Olympic Games from 26 August to 11 September 1972.

==== Munich massacre ====
The Games were largely overshadowed by what has come to be known as the Munich massacre. On 5 September, a group of eight Palestinian terrorists belonging to the Black September organization broke into the Olympic Village and took eleven Israeli athletes, coaches and officials hostage in their apartments. Two of the hostages who resisted were killed in the first moments of the break-in; the subsequent standoff in the Olympic Village lasted for almost 18 hours.

==== Medal count ====
These were the top ten nations that won medals at these Games.

The host country is highlighted.

* Host nation (West Germany)

| Rank | Nation | Gold | Silver | Bronze | Total |
|---|---|---|---|---|---|
| 1 | Soviet Union (URS) | 50 | 27 | 22 | 99 |
| 2 | United States (USA) | 33 | 31 | 30 | 94 |
| 3 | East Germany (GDR) | 20 | 23 | 23 | 66 |
| 4 | West Germany (FRG)* | 13 | 11 | 16 | 40 |
| 5 | Japan (JPN) | 13 | 8 | 8 | 29 |
| 6 | Australia (AUS) | 8 | 7 | 2 | 17 |
| 7 | Poland (POL) | 7 | 5 | 9 | 21 |
| 8 | Hungary (HUN) | 6 | 13 | 16 | 35 |
| 9 | Bulgaria (BUL) | 6 | 10 | 5 | 21 |
| 10 | Italy (ITA) | 5 | 3 | 10 | 18 |
| Totals (10 entries) | | 161 | 138 | 141 | 440 |

=== 2018 Winter Olympics bid ===
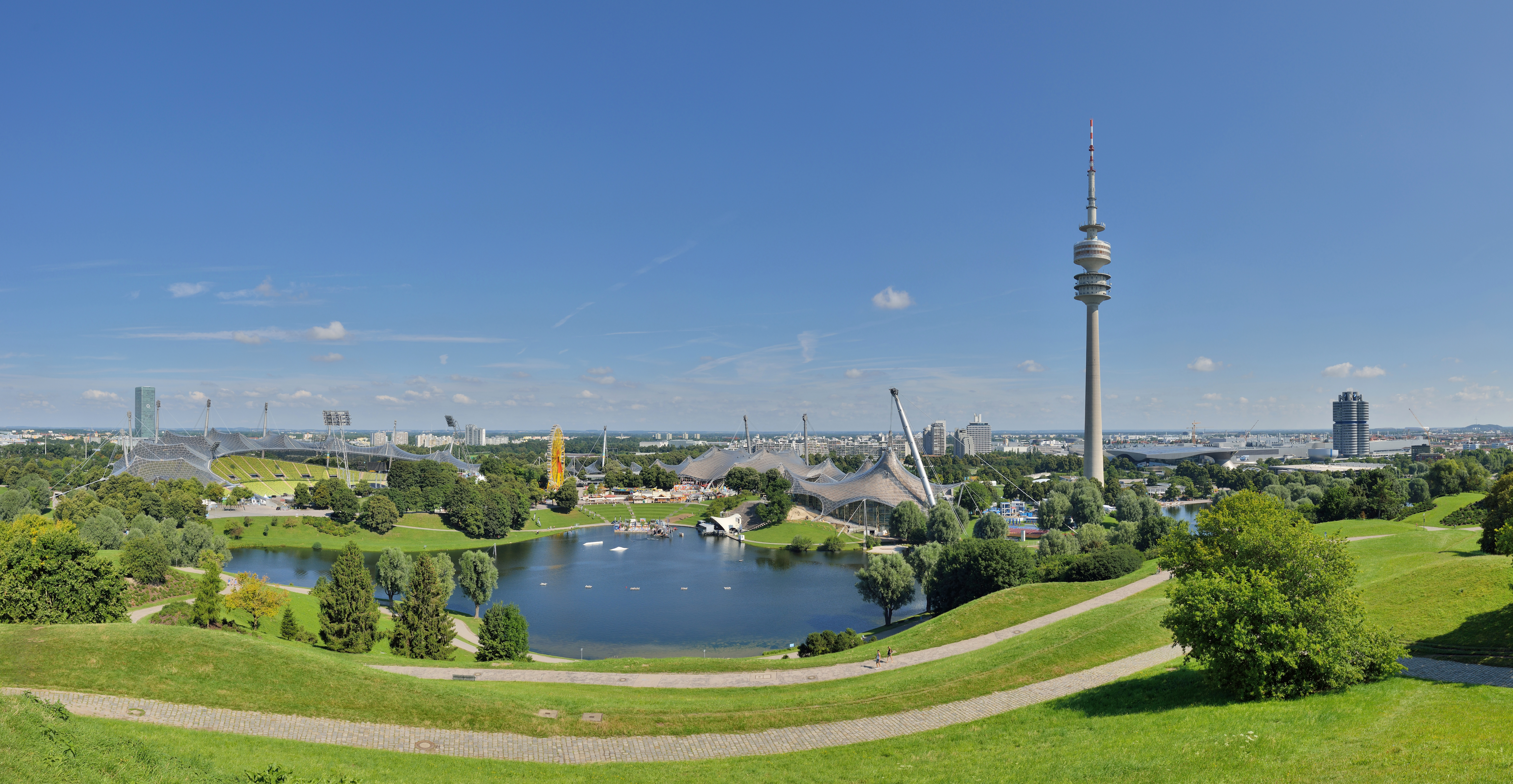
Olympiasee in Olympiapark, Munich

On 22 June 2010, the International Olympic Committee selected Munich as one of the three candidate cities for the 2018 Winter Olympic Games, along with Annecy (in France) and Pyeongchang (in South Korea). If chosen, Munich would have been the first city to host both the Summer and Winter Olympic Games. Pyeongchang was announced as the host after receiving 63 votes, with Munich finishing second after receiving 25 votes.

== Basketball ==
Munich's Olympiahalle hosted the final stages of the FIBA EuroBasket in 1993.

== Athletes born in Munich ==
=== Football ===
- Markus Babbel
- Franz Beckenbauer
- Thomas Hitzlsperger
- Philipp Lahm
- Christian Lell
- Jan Mauersberger
- Zvjezdan Misimović
- Andreas Ottl

=== Hockey ===
- Markus Pöttinger
- Christoph Schubert

=== Other ===
- Craig Lefferts
