= Stoczniowiec Gdańsk (disambiguation) =

Stoczniowiec Gdańsk (Stoczniowiec being the Polish for "shipyard") is a name used by some sports teams in Gdańsk, Poland.

== Current uses ==
- SKS Stoczniowiec Gdańsk, Polish football team, formed in 1945.
- Stoczniowiec Gdańsk, Polish ice hockey team, formed in 1953.

Both teams have also gone by the names Polonia Gdańsk.
