= Polonyna =

Polonyna may refer to:

- Polonyna (montane meadow), a type of mountain meadows in the Carpathians
- Polonyna Chornohora, a mountain in the Ukrainian Carpathians
- Polonyna Beskids, a mountain range of the Eastern Beskids

== See also ==
- Poloniny (disambiguation)
- Polonia (disambiguation)
