= Hotel Polonia Palast =

Hotel in Łódź, Poland

Hotel Polonia Palace
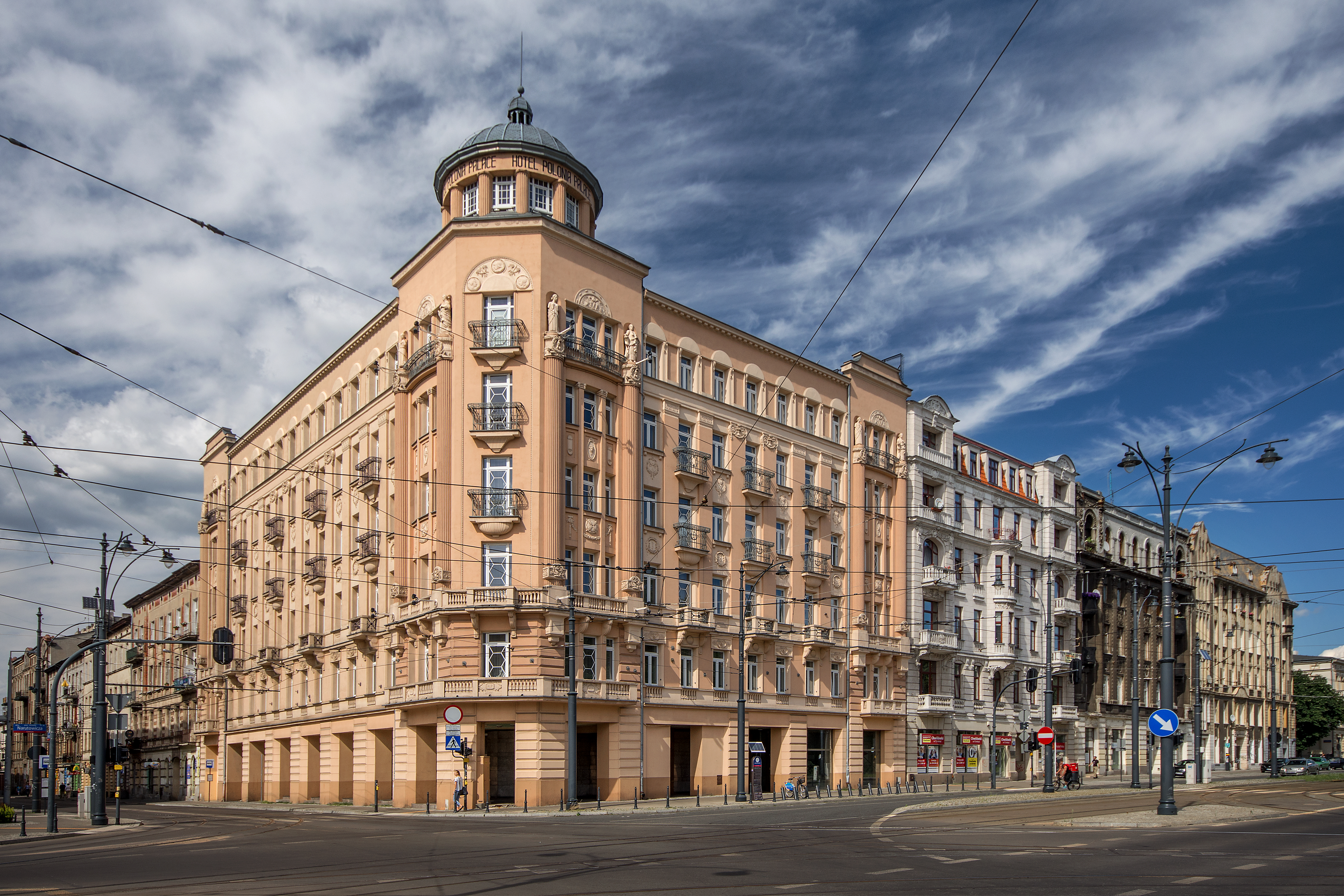
- Interactive map of the Hotel Polonia Palace area

General information
- Location: 38 Narutowicza str. Łódź, Poland
- Coordinates: 51°46′17.14″N 19°27′48.32″E
- Opening: 1912

Website
- polonia.centrumhotele.pl

Hotel Polonia Palst is a hotel in Łódź, Poland.

== History ==
Hotel Palast was built in the years 1910 to 1912, at the then intersection of Dzielna and Widzewska streets. The Dobrzyński family gave the idea for the construction. The facade of the hotel was designed by Rudolf Koloch from Wrocław. The elevations had a classicist style with breaks of grooved half-columns. Allegorical figures of women in ancient costumes stood on them.

The building was very modern for its period, because it had central heating, electric light, a lift, a chemical-electric laundry, telephones, running water and extensive equipment. After World War I, the owners of the hotel were the brothers Leopold Dobrzyński and Maurycy Dobrzyński. In the 1920s, during the general overhaul, the name was changed to Polonia Palast. In 1939, the name was changed again, this time to Polonia. After the Second World War, the building was occupied by the Red Army and it set up a military hospital there.

In January 1946, the hotel was handed over to the city authorities, which subordinated it to Hotel Miejskie. The building was completely renovated in the years 1969–1972. The arcades were created along the facade of the building and the intersection of Kiliński street and Narutowicz street.

In 2009, a general renovation was completed. The façade and the interior of the building both had been renovated. In addition to restoring the old look, it was decided to return to the name Polonia Palast.
