= Stella Polonia =

- Origin: Toronto, Ontario, Canada
- Genres: Folk
- Years active: 2004–present
- Website: www.stellapolonia.ca

Stella Polonia is a Polish folk song and dance ensemble associated with Our Lady Queen of Poland Parish in Toronto, Ontario, Canada. The group was founded in 2004 by Fr. Miroslaw Frankowski with Ewa and Tadeusz Wierzbicki.

Stella Polonia's repertoire includes all Polish national dances as well as a selection of Polish regional dances and songs. All arrangements are based on authentic folk elements which have been adapted for stage performance. Dance performances are interweaved with folk songs and instrumentals, which allow for a variety of programs, ensuring that each performance is unique. Polish folklore represents a cultural heritage, and each dance and song is performed in costumes that belong to that specific region. Costumes used by Stella Polonia have been custom-made and incorporate original designs and concepts by Ewa Wierzbicka and Fr. Miroslaw Frankowski.

The group has performed on more than 100 occasions throughout Canada, the USA and Mexico. Their performances have been featured on Canadian, US and Polish television channels, and have been presented on CD or DVD. The group has approximately 119 active members, which includes dancers in five age groups, musicians and support persons.

Stella Polonia is involved in charitable activities, giving free performances for seniors and organizing humanitarian aid for orphanages in Poland.
