= FC Polonia Berlin =

Polish association football club

FC Polonia Berlin e. V.
- Full name: FC Polonia Berlin e. V.
- Nicknames: Biało-Czerwoni (The Whites and Reds); Polacy (Poles)
- Founded: 2012
- Ground: Polonia Park (Sportplatz Ollenhauerstraße)
- Chairman: Adrian Tomaszewski
- League: Kreisliga A
- 2023–24: 7th
Home colours

FC Polonia Berlin e. V. is a Polish association football club based in the locality of Reinickendorf in the borough of the Reinickendorf in Berlin, Germany.

== History ==
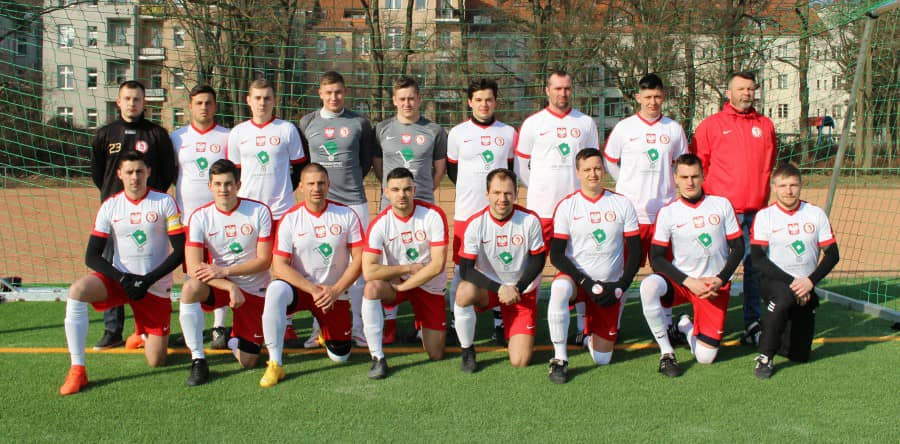
FC Polonia Berlin team in 2017/2018 season.

The club refers to the heritage of the Polski Klub Sportowy Berlin (PKS Berlin or PKS Zryw Berlin).

PKS Berlin was founded in 1911. The club was merged with BSG Handelsorganisation Berlin (BSG HO Berlin) in 1951. BSG HO Berlin was incorporated into the sports association SV Empor in 1954 and renamed BSG Empor Nord Berlin. The club was known as BSG Empor HO Berlin from 1974. The club reached the third tier of the East German football league system. BSG Empor HO Berlin was renamed SV Empor Berlin in 1990.

FC Polonia Berlin was founded in 2012 by Poles living in Berlin and Germans of Polish descent.

FC Polonia Berlin plays in the ninth tier Kreisliga A. The name Polonia is used by other Polish-centred clubs in Germany (for example Polonia Hamburg).

== Seasons ==
Season	Division	Pos	G	Pts	W	D	L	F	A
2017–18	Kreisliga C group 4 (11th tier)	1/12	22	55	17	4	1	104	20
2018–19	Kreisliga B group 2 (10th tier)	1/16	30	79	26	1	3	124	35
2019–20	Kreisliga A group 2 (9th tier)	11/15	19	1,21	7	2	10	53	54
2020–21	Kreisliga A group 4 (9th tier)	7/17	4	-	2	0	2	9	5
2021–22	Kreisliga A group 4 (9th tier)	5/16	30	54	16	6	8	110	70
2022–23	Kreisliga A group 4 (9th tier)	9/16	30	34	11	1	18	78	91
2023–24	Kreisliga A group 4 (9th tier)	7/14	26	37	11	4	11	65	64
2024–25	Kreisliga A group 3 (9th tier)	9/16	30	39	11	9	10	81	64
2025–26	Kreisliga A group 3 (9th tier)	?/16	30						
