= Triovasalos =

Triovasalos Τριοβασάλος
- Community
- Location within Greece
- Coordinates: 36°44′41″N 24°26′00″E
- Country: Greece
- Administrative region: South Aegean
- Regional unit: Milos
- Municipality: Milos

Population (2021)
  - Community: 1,379
- Time zone: UTC+2 (EET)
  - Summer (DST): UTC+3 (EEST)

Triovasalos is a village and a community in the island of Milos, Cyclades, Greece. According to the 2021 Greek census it had 1,379 residents. Triovasalos is adjacent to the neighboring Pera Triovasalos and the two villages together occupy two neighboring cliffs.

The main sights of the village are two churches: one of Saint Spyridon, dated to the start of the 19th century, and one of Saint George, dated to 1849.
