= Polonia Gdańsk (disambiguation) =

Polonia Gdańsk (Polonia being the Latin name for "Poland") is a name that has been used by some sports teams in Gdańsk, Poland.

== Former uses ==
- SKS Stoczniowiec Gdańsk, Polish football team, formed in 1945. Known as "Polonia Gdańsk" during the 1960s–1970, and 1992–2020.
- Stoczniowiec Gdańsk, Polish ice hockey team, formed in 1953. Known as "Polonia Gdańsk" from 1953 to 1970.
- Lechia-Polonia Gdańsk, Polish football team, formed in 1998, dissolved in 2002. Formed by a merger between Lechia Gdańsk and Polonia Gdańsk

Both teams that are still functioning that used the Polonia Gdańsk name now go by the name Stoczniowiec Gdańsk.
