= Football in Germany =

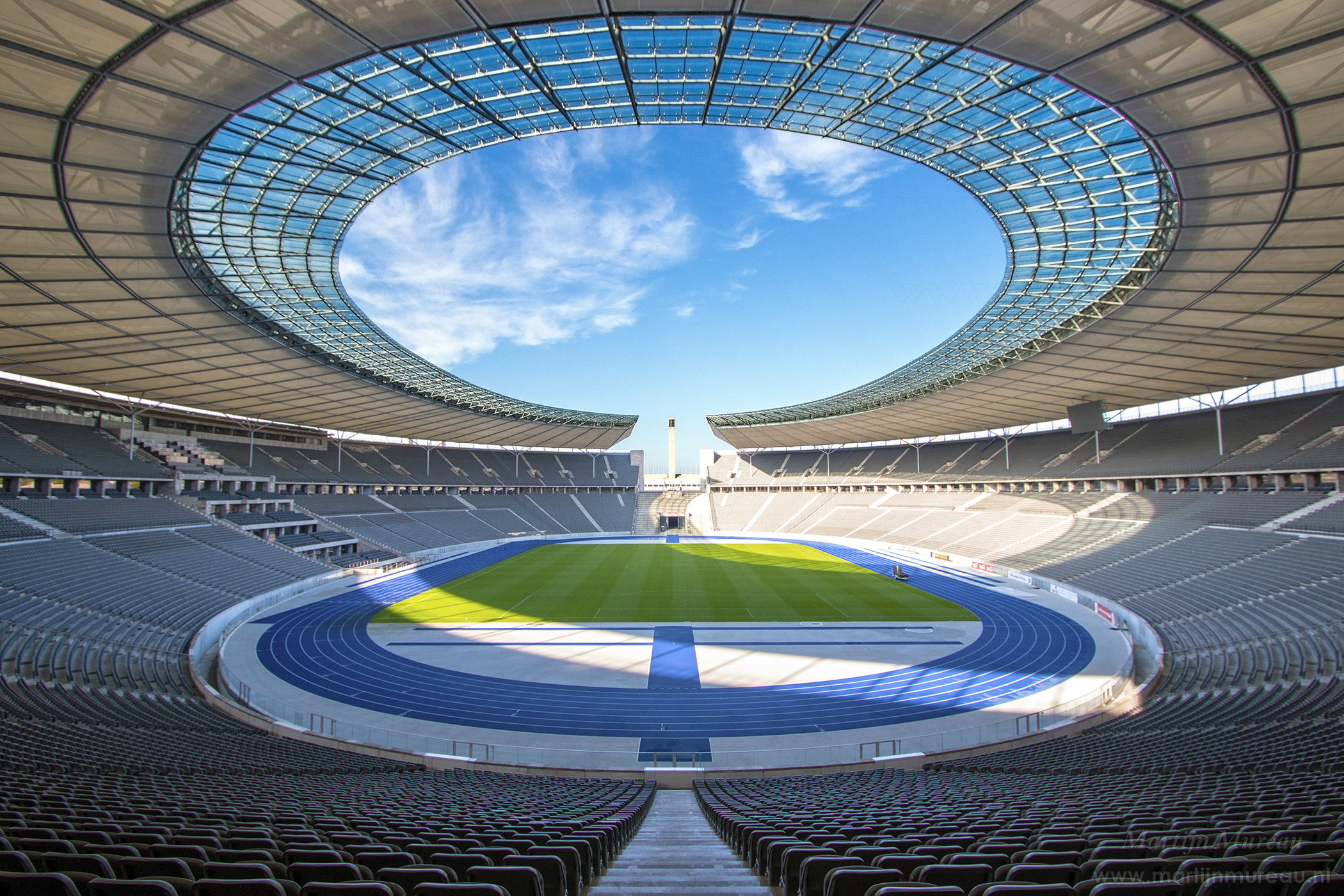
- Olympiastadion in Berlin, used by Hertha BSC, the national football team of Germany and for the final of the DFB-Pokal
- Country: Germany
- Governing body: DFB
- National team: Men's • women's
- First played: 1874; 152 years ago
- Clubs: 31,000F

National competitions
- FIFA World Cup; FIFA Women's World Cup; UEFA European Championship; UEFA Women's Championship; UEFA Nations League; UEFA Women's Nations League

Club competitions
- List: League: Bundesliga Frauen-Bundesliga; 2. Bundesliga; 3. Liga Regionalliga: Regionalliga Nord Regionalliga Nordost Regionalliga West Regionalliga Südwest Regionalliga Bayern Oberliga Landesliga Verbandsliga; Cups: DFB-Pokal DFB-Pokal Frauen Franz Beckenbauer Supercup DFB-Supercup Frauen

International competitions
- FIFA Club World Cup; FIFA Intercontinental Cup; UEFA Champions League; UEFA Women's Champions League; UEFA Europa League; UEFA Women's Europa Cup; UEFA Conference League; UEFA Super Cup

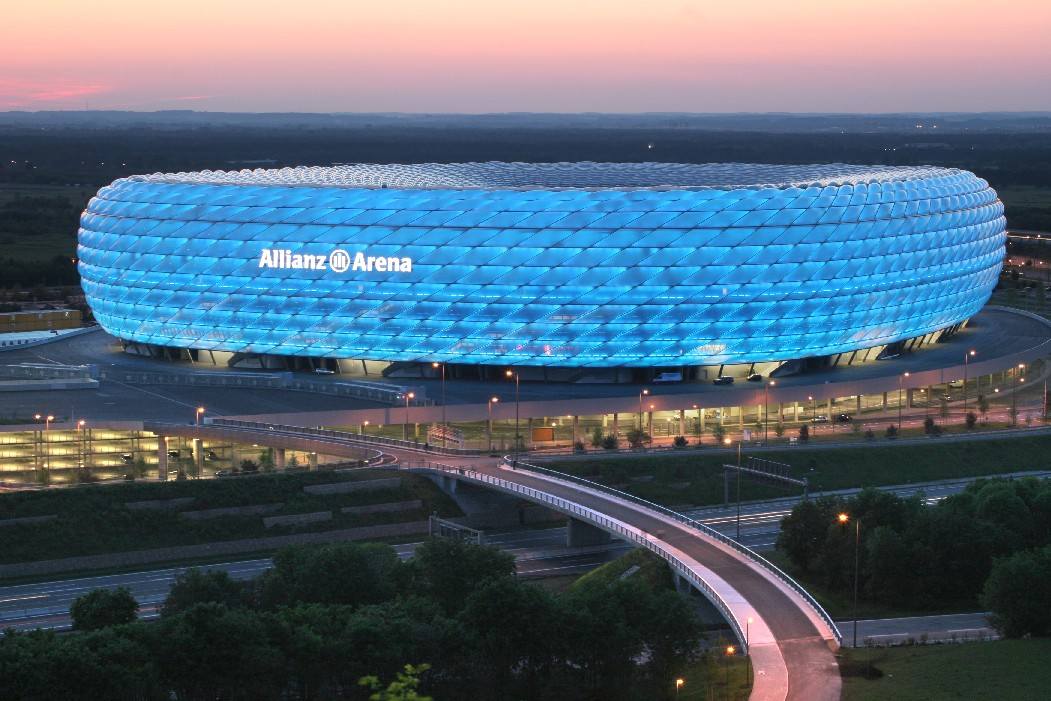
Allianz Arena in Munich, home stadium of club FC Bayern Munich

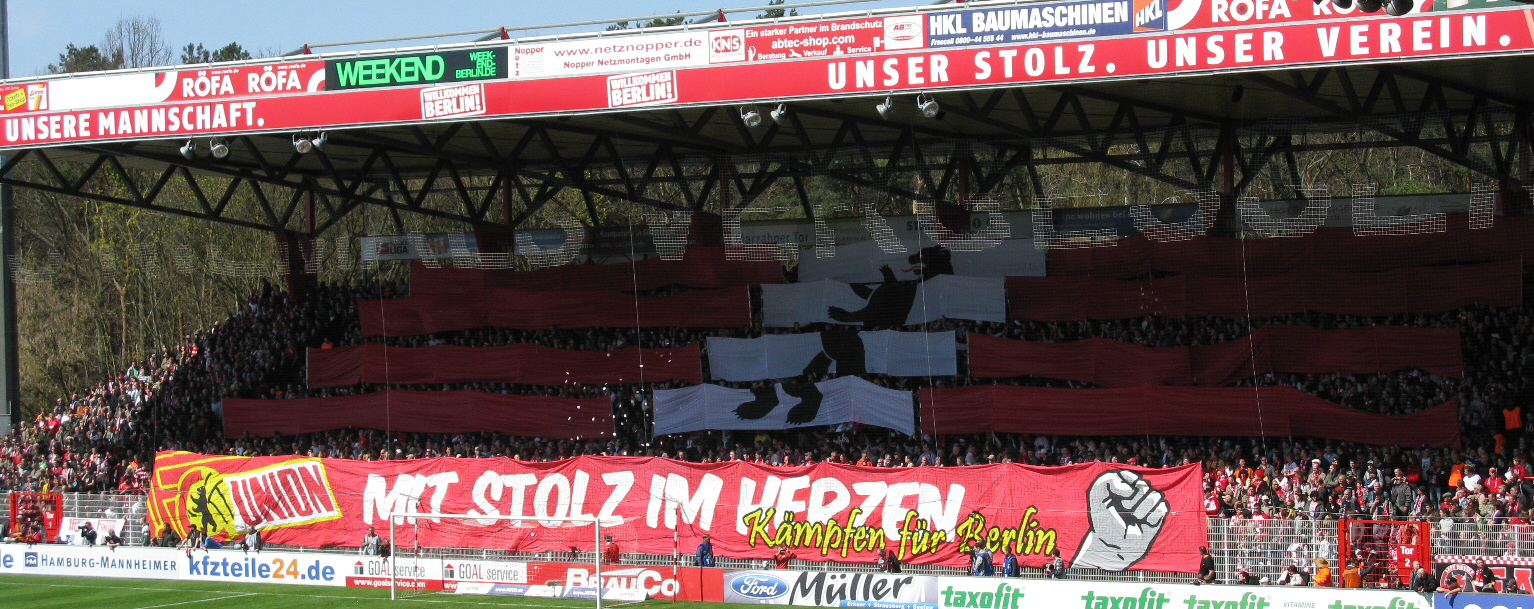
Supporters choreography for the German Football Association club 1. FC Union Berlin

Football is the most popular sport in Germany with 57% of the population declaring interest in watching it. The German Football Association (German: Deutscher Fußball-Bund or DFB) is the sport's national governing body, with 6.6 million members (roughly eight percent of the population) organized in over 23,713 football clubs.

There is a league system, with the Bundesliga (men, women) and 2. Bundesliga (men, women) on top. The winner of the Bundesliga is crowned the German football champion. Additionally, there are domestic cup competitions, most notably the DFB-Pokal (men, women) and Supercup (men, women).

The Germany men's national football team has won four FIFA World Cups (1954, 1974, 1990, 2014), being the joint-second most successful nation (shared with Italy) in the tournament only surpassed by Brazil. It also holds three UEFA European Championships (1972, 1980, 1996), behind only Spain, and won the FIFA Confederations Cup in 2017.

The Germany women's national football team has won two FIFA Women's World Cups (2003, 2007) and a record eight UEFA European Women's Championships (1989, 1991, 1995, 1997, 2001, 2005, 2009, 2013), as well as a gold medal in the Summer Olympics in 2016.

Germany was the first nation to win both the men's and women's World Cup.

(West) Germany hosted of men's FIFA World Cup in 1974 and 2006, the UEFA European Championship in 1988 and 2024 and the FIFA Confederations Cup in 2005. They also hosted the 1989, 1995 and 2001 editions of the UEFA European Women's Championship, as well as the 2011 FIFA Women's World Cup.

== History ==
=== Introduction to football ===
The earliest record men's football match took place in Braunschweig in 1874. Two schoolteachers, August Hermann and Konrad Koch, initiated the first match after Hermann had obtained a round football from England. In 1875, Koch published the first German version of the rules of football, although Koch's version of the game still closely resembled Rugby football.

=== Early clubs and associations ===
The Dresden English Football Club is considered the first modern football club in Germany and probably the first in continental Europe. It was founded in 1874 by Englishmen living and working around Dresden. In the following 20 years the game achieved a growing popularity. Football clubs were founded in Berlin, Hamburg and Stuttgart.

On 28 January 1900, representatives from 86 football clubs from German-speaking areas in and outside the German Empire met in the restaurant Mariengarten in Leipzig, founding the DFB. The founding meeting was led by E. J. Kirmse, chairman of the Leipziger Fussball Verband (Leipzig Football Association). Ferdinand Hueppe, representing the DFC Prag, was elected the first president of the DFB.

Already some years before 1900, associations like the Bund Deutscher Fussballspieler or Deutscher Fussball und Cricket-Bund were founded, but they were limited to smaller areas of the German Empire, in those cases to areas around Berlin. The first championship beyond municipal areas was held in 1898 by the Verband Sueddeutscher Fussball-Vereine (Association of South German football clubs), later affiliated with the DFB.

The first women's football club was found in Leipzig in 1907.

The men's national football team has represented Germany in international football competitions since 1908.

=== Weimar Republic ===
In 1919, the proletarian Arbeiter-Turnbund was renamed Arbeiter-Turn- und Sportbund (ATSB). The name change especially reflected the incorporation of football into the federation, which promoted leftist political views and attempted to break the monopolisation of football under the umbrella of the DFB.

The German men's national football team played its first post-WWI match on 27 June 1920 in Zürich against Switzerland, which the Swiss team won 1:4.

In 1930, Lotte Specht founded the 1. Deutscher Damen-Fußballclub, a women's football club, in Frankfurt am Main.

=== Nazi Germany ===
With the rise of Nazism, left-leaning sporting associations such as the ATSB and Rotsport were banned. Communist sporting officials such as Ernst Grube, Reichstag deputy and head of Rotsport, were murdered in concentration camps. The DFB integrated as Fachamt Reichsfußball into the National Socialist League of the Reich for Physical Exercise. From 1933 to 1945 the highest level of play in German football was organised in 16 Gauligen, whose winners qualified for the finals in the German championship, held at the end of season.

In 1936, the football authorities of the Deutscher Reichsbund für Leibesübungen publicly declared football incompatible with the prescribed role of women in the Nazi state and stated that womens should be deliberately excluded from such sports.

=== Re-organisation after World War II ===
Following the war, the DFB was re-founded in 1950. It claimed and was recognised to organise football in all of Germany, but effectively only controlled the sport in West Germany. In 1948, the Saarland Football Association was founded in the Saar Protectorate and joined FIFA in 1950. The German Football Association (DFV) joined FIFA in 1952 and governed football in East Germany.

The West German men's national team and the Saar men's national team both entered the qualification of the men's FIFA World Cup 1954. While Germany won the tournament, the Saar team failed to qualify. The East Germany men's national team entered the qualification of the men's FIFA World Cup 1958.

A nationwide men's league was founded in East Germany in 1949 (DDR-Oberliga). The nationwide men's Bundesliga was only introduced in 1963.

The West German DFB banned women's football within the federation in 1955. In response, the West German Women's Football Association and the German Women's Football Association were founded in 1956 and 1957, respectively. Both organised local competitions, as well as a combined 220 international matches. In 1957, the International Ladies Football Association was founded in Nuremberg as a global women's football governing body. It organised a European Championship in Berlin in 1957.

The East German DFV never banned women's football. Women's football teams emerged from the late 1950s onwards.

=== Cold War ===
The men's FIFA World Cup 1974 was staged in West Germany, and both German teams were drawn in the same group in the first round. Meeting on 22 June 1974 in a politically charged match in Hamburg, East Germany beat West Germany 1–0, on a goal by Jürgen Sparwasser. Both German teams advanced to the second round anyway. The GDR team was eliminated there, while the DFB team eventually went on to win the tournament.

=== Reunification ===
In the year of German reunification (1990), the West Germany men's national team secured its third World Cup.

East Germany fielded a women's national team for the first time in 1990, playing a single friendly match against the Czech Republic before disbanding.

To integrate the clubs from East Germany into the DFB league system, the men's Bundesliga was extended 20 clubs for the 1991/1992 season and immediately reduced back to 18 teams after the season.

Similarly, the North and South Divisions of the women's Bundesliga were both extended to 11 teams for the 1991/1992 season and reduced back to 10 each after the season.

== Organisation ==
=== German Football Association (DFB) ===
The national association is the German Football Association (or Deutscher Fußball-Bund) headquartered in Frankfurt. The association has 23,713 member clubs which field 144,007 teams of which 10,791 are women's and girls' teams. With over eight million active and passive members, the DFB is the world's largest sports federation.

==== National teams ====
===== Men's =====
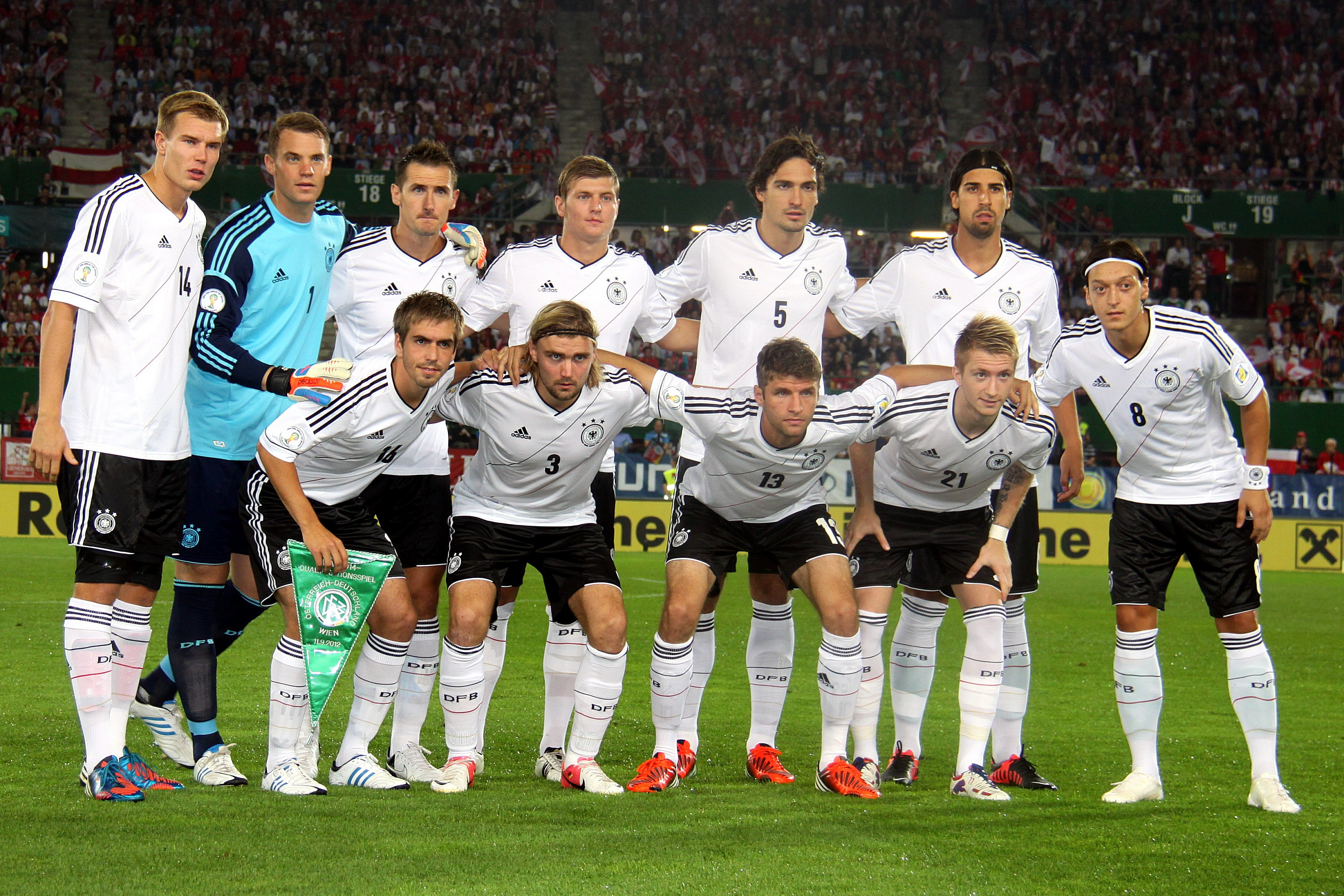
Germany national football team in 2012

The Germany men's national football team has represented Germany in international football competitions since 1908. It has won four FIFA World Cups and three European Championships.

===== Women's =====
While several teams represented Germany internationally in women's football since 1956, the DFB-organised national team has represented Germany since 1982. It has won two FIFA World Cups and eight European Championships.

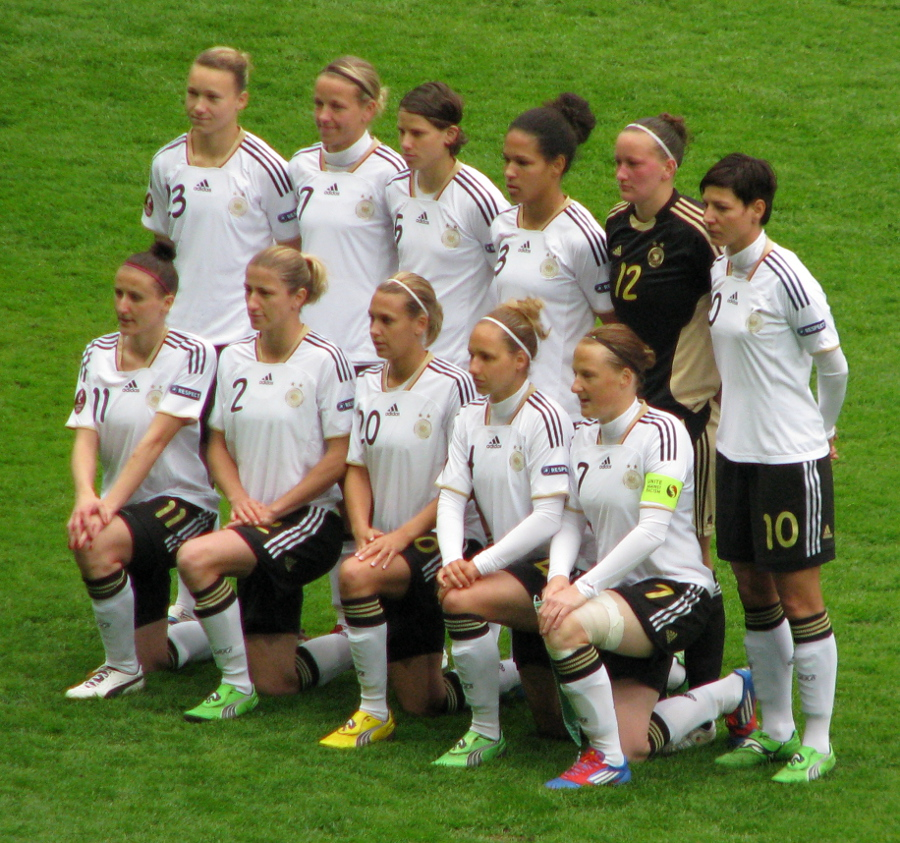
Germany national football team in 2012

=== Home stadiums ===
The national teams play in various stadiums throughout Germany.

== Men's honours ==
=== Major competitions ===
FIFA World Cup

- Champions (4): 1954, 1974, 1990, 2014
- Runners-up (4): 1966, 1982, 1986, 2002
- Third place (4): 1934, 1970, 2006, 2010
- Fourth place (1): 1958

UEFA European Championship

- Champions (3): 1972, 1980, 1996
- Runners-up (3): 1976, 1992, 2008
- Third place (3): 1988, 2012, 2016

Summer Olympic Games

- Gold Medal (1): 1976
- Silver Medal (2): 1980, 2016
- Bronze Medal (3): 1964, 1972, 1988
- Fourth place (1): 1952

FIFA Confederations Cup

- Champions (1): 2017
- Third place (1): 2005

UEFA Nations League

- Fourth place (1): 2024-25

Overview
Event	1st place	2nd place	3rd place	4th place
FIFA World Cup	4	4	4	1
UEFA European Championship	3	3	3	x
Summer Olympic Games	1	2	3	1
FIFA Confederations Cup	1	0	1	0
UEFA Nations League	0	0	0	1
Total	9	9	11	3

== Women's honours ==
=== Major competitions ===
FIFA Women's World Cup

- Champions (2): 2003, 2007
- Runners-up (1): 1995
- Fourth place (2): 1991, 2015

UEFA Women's Championship

- Champions (8): 1989, 1991, 1995, 1997, 2001, 2005, 2009, 2013
- Runners-up (1): 2022
- Fourth place (1): 1993

Summer Olympic Games

- Gold Medal (1): 2016
- Bronze Medal (4): 2000, 2004, 2008, 2024

UEFA Women's Nations League

- Third place (1): 2024

Overview
Event	1st place	2nd place	3rd place	4th place
FIFA Women's World Cup	2	1	0	2
UEFA Women's Championship	8	1	0	1
Summer Olympic Games	1	0	4	0
UEFA Women's Nations League	0	0	1	0
Total	11	2	5	3

== FIFA World Cup ==
The Germany men's national football team has won four FIFA World Cups and have been the runners up on four other occasions. The four World Cup championships are commemorated by the four stars above the Germany national team logo on the team's jerseys. Germany hosted the World Cups in 1974 and in 2006.

The women's national team has won two FIFA Women's World Cups, commemorated by two stars above the crest on their jerseys. Germany hosted the 2011 Women's World Cup.

== UEFA European Championship ==
The Germany men's national team has won three European Championship (1972, 1980 and 1996) and finished as a runners-up in 1976, 1992 and 2008.

The Germany women's national team has won a record eight European Championships (1989, 1991, 1995, 1997, 2001, 2005, 2009, 2013) and finished as a runners-up in 2022.

== Club football ==
=== Men's league system ===
The country's top-tier men's league is the 18-team Bundesliga. Bayern Munich has won a record of 31 Bundesliga championships since the formation of the league in 1963. The second-tier league is known as the 2. Bundesliga. The third tier is named 3. Liga.

=== Women's league system ===
The country's top-tier women's league is the 14-team Bundesliga. VfL Wolfsburg, 1. FFC Frankfurt and Bayern Munich all have won a record 7 Bundesliga titles since the formation of the league in 1990. The second-tier league is known as 2. Bundesliga. From 2027, a nationwide third-tier league will be implemented.

=== Domestic cup competitions ===
The DFB-Pokal is the national men's competition in Germany. It has been held annually since 1952. Bayern Munich has a won record 21 titles. Each football club which participates in the German football league system is entitled to enter the tournament. The clubs of the lower leagues play in regional qualification rounds, with the winners joining the teams of the Bundesliga, 2. Bundesliga and the top placed teams of 3. Liga in the main round of the tournament in the following year. Each elimination is determined by a single game held on the ground of one of the two participating teams. Since 1985 the final has been held each year at the Olympic Stadium in Berlin.

The national women's cup competition is also named DFB-Pokal. It has been held annually since 1980. VfL Wolfsburg has won a record 11 titles. Each football club which participates in the German football league system is entitled to enter the tournament. The clubs of the lower leagues play in regional qualification rounds, with the winners joining the teams of the Bundesliga and 2. Bundesliga in the main round of the tournament in the following year.Each elimination is determined by a single game held on the ground of one of the two participating teams. Since 2010, the final has been held each year at the RheinEnergie Stadion in Cologne.

== German clubs in international competitions ==
=== Men's clubs ===
German clubs have won the UEFA Champions League and its predecessor, the European Cup, eight times: Bayern Munich in 1974, 1975, 1976, 2001, 2013 and 2020; Borussia Dortmund in 1997 and Hamburger SV in 1983.

The Europa League and its predecessor UEFA Cup have been won by Borussia Mönchengladbach (1995 & 1979), Eintracht Frankfurt (1980 & 2022), Bayer Leverkusen (1988), Bayern Munich (1996) and Schalke 04 (1997).

=== Women's clubs ===
German clubs have won the UEFA Champions League and its predecessor UEFA Women's Cup nine times: 1. FFC Frankfurt in 2002, 2006, 2008 and 2015; Turbine Potsdam in 2005 and 2010; VfL Wolfsburg in 2013 and 2014 and FCR 2001 Duisburg in 2009. With a combined nine titles, German teams are the most successful in European club competitions.

== German football stadiums ==
Stadiums with a capacity of 60,000 or higher are included.

#	Image	Stadium	Capacity	City	State	Home team(s)	Opened	Notes
1		Westfalenstadion	81,365	Dortmund	North Rhine-Westphalia	Borussia Dortmund	1974	UEFA Category 4 stadium
2		Allianz Arena	75,000	Munich	Bavaria	FC Bayern Munich	2005	UEFA Category 4 stadium
3		Olympiastadion Berlin	74,475	Berlin	Berlin	Hertha BSC	1936	UEFA Category 4 stadium
4		Olympiastadion Munich	69,250	Munich	Bavaria	Various	1972	
5		Veltins-Arena	62,271	Gelsenkirchen	North Rhine-Westphalia	FC Schalke 04	2001	UEFA Category 4 stadium
6		MHPArena	60,469	Stuttgart	Baden-Württemberg	VfB Stuttgart	1933	UEFA Category 4 stadium

== See also ==
- Women's football in Germany
- East Germany national football team
- Futsal in Germany
- Football in Berlin
- Football in Munich
