= Polonia Chmielnicki =

Ukrainian football team

- Full name: Football Club Polonia Chmielnicki
- Founded: 2007
- Ground: Lokomotiv Stadium
- Manager: Roman Medlakowski
- League: Khmelnytskyi Oblast Football Championship
- Website: FC. Polonia Chmielnicki on Facebook
| Home colours colors | Away colours colors |

Polonia Chmielnicki is an association football club from Khmelnytskyi, founded in 2007 by local members of Polish minority in Ukraine. Its colours are white-red-black, and the team's chairman is Roman Medlakowski. The history of the team is closely associated with the Municipal Association of Poles in Khmelnytskyi: a group, which had originally existed until 1992, and refounded in 2007. Together with the Association, Polonia Khmelnytskyi was created in the same year. The team is financially supported by local Poles and the Polish Consulate.

== Sources ==
- Polski klub piłkarski Polonia Chmielnicki, czyli kresowe granie

== See also ==
- List of football clubs in Ukraine
- Pogoń Lwów
- Poles in Ukraine
- Polonia Wilno
