= 2018 SE Palmeiras season =

Palmeiras
2018 season
- President: Maurício Galiotte
- Coach: Roger Machado (Until July 25); Wesley Carvalho (interim); Paulo Turra (interim); Felipão (August 3–)
- Stadium: Allianz Parque
- Série A: Champions
- Campeonato Paulista: Runners-up
- Copa Libertadores: Semifinal
- Copa do Brasil: Semifinal
- Top goalscorer: League: Willian (10 goals); All: Miguel Borja (20 goals)
- Highest home attendance: 41,256 (vs. Vitória – December 2)
- Lowest home attendance: 22,597 (vs. São Caetano – March 5)
- Average home league attendance: 32,476
Home colors	Away colors	Third colors

The 2018 season was the 104th in SE Palmeiras' existence. This season Palmeiras participated in the Campeonato Paulista, Copa Libertadores, Copa do Brasil and the Série A.

== Players ==
=== Squad information ===
As of the end of the season. Note: Flags indicate national team as defined under FIFA eligibility rules; some limited exceptions apply. Players may hold more than one non-FIFA nationality.

No.	Pos.	Nation	Player
1	GK	BRA	Fernando Prass (vice-captain)
2	DF	BRA	Marcos Rocha (on loan from Atlético Mineiro)
3	DF	BRA	Edu Dracena
4	DF	ARG	Nicolás Freire (on loan from Torque)
5	MF	BRA	Thiago Santos
6	DF	BRA	Diogo Barbosa
7	FW	BRA	Dudu (captain)
9	FW	COL	Miguel Borja
10	MF	BRA	Moisés
12	DF	BRA	Mayke (on loan from Cruzeiro)
13	DF	BRA	Luan
14	MF	BRA	Gustavo Scarpa
15	DF	PAR	Gustavo Gómez (on loan from Milan)
16	FW	BRA	Deyverson

No.	Pos.	Nation	Player
17	MF	BRA	Jean
18	MF	VEN	Alejandro Guerra
19	MF	BRA	Bruno Henrique
20	MF	BRA	Lucas Lima
21	GK	BRA	Weverton
25	DF	BRA	Antônio Carlos
26	DF	BRA	Victor Luis
28	MF	BRA	Hyoran
29	FW	BRA	Willian
30	MF	BRA	Felipe Melo
37	FW	BRA	Artur
39	MF	BRA	Vitinho
42	GK	BRA	Jailson
44	DF	BRA	Pedrão

=== Transfers ===
==== Transfers in ====
Pos.	Player	Transferred from	Fee/notes	Date	Source
DF	(Brazil) Emerson Santos	(Brazil) Botafogo	Sign.	August 16, 2017	
DF	(Brazil) Diogo Barbosa	(Brazil) Cruzeiro	Sign.	November 17, 2017	
MF	(Brazil) Lucas Lima	(Brazil) Santos	Sign.	November 30, 2017	
GK	(Brazil) Weverton	(Brazil) Atlético Paranaense	R$2,000,000.	December 15, 2017	
DF	(Brazil) Marcos Rocha	(Brazil) Atlético Mineiro	Loan.	December 27, 2017	
DF	(Brazil) Victor Luis	(Brazil) Botafogo	Loan return.	January 3, 2018	
DF	(Brazil) Pedrão	Youth system	Sign.	January 3, 2018	
MF	(Argentina) Agustín Allione	(Brazil) Bahia	Loan return.	January 3, 2018	
FW	(Brazil) Artur	(Brazil) Londrina	Loan return.	January 3, 2018	
DF	(Brazil) Thiago Martins	(Brazil) Bahia	Loan return.	January 3, 2018	
MF	(Brazil) Gustavo Scarpa	(Brazil) Fluminense	Free transfer.	January 15, 2018	
DF	(Argentina) Nicolás Freire	(Netherlands) PEC Zwolle	Loan.	June 25, 2018	
MF	(Brazil) Vitinho	(Spain) Barcelona B	Loan return.	June 27, 2018	
DF	(Paraguay) Gustavo Gómez	(Italy) Milan	Loan.	July 31, 2018	
MF	(Japan) Daiju Sasaki	(Japan) Vissel Kobe	Loan.	August 14, 2018	

==== Transfers out ====
Pos.	Player	Transferred to	Fee/notes	Date	Source
DF	(Brazil) Zé Roberto		Retired.	November 25, 2017	
DF	(Brazil) Egídio	(Brazil) Cruzeiro	Sign.	November 29, 2017	
MF	(Brazil) Arouca	(Brazil) Atlético Mineiro	Loan.	December 14, 2017	
GK	(Brazil) Vinicius Silvestre	(Brazil) Ponte Preta	Loan.	December 15, 2017	
FW	(Brazil) Erik	(Brazil) Atlético Mineiro	Loan.	December 18, 2017	
FW	(Brazil) Róger Guedes	(Brazil) Atlético Mineiro	Loan.	December 27, 2017	
DF	(Brazil) João Pedro	(Brazil) Bahia	Loan.	December 30, 2017	
MF	(Brazil) Raphael Veiga	(Brazil) Atlético Paranaense	Loan.	January 2, 2018	
DF	(Colombia) Yerry Mina	(Spain) Barcelona	R$48,000,000.	January 10, 2018	
MF	(Argentina) Agustín Allione	(Brazil) Bahia	Loan	January 26, 2018	
DF	(Brazil) Fabiano	(Brazil) Internacional	Loan	March 10, 2018	
DF	(Brazil) Juninho	(Brazil) Atlético Mineiro	Loan	April 27, 2018	
MF	(Brazil) Michel Bastos	(Brazil) Sport	Loan	April 28, 2018	
MF	(Brazil) Tchê Tchê	(Ukraine) Dynamo Kyiv	R$20,400,000	June 3, 2018	
FW	(Brazil) Róger Guedes	(China) Shandong Luneng Taishan	Loan.	July 13, 2018	
FW	(Brazil) Keno	(Egypt) Pyramids FC	R$37,800,000	June 25, 2018	
DF	(Brazil) João Pedro	(Portugal) FC Porto	R$16,100,000	July 7, 2018	
GK	(Brazil) Daniel Fuzato	(Italy) Roma	R$2,100,000	July 9, 2018	
DF	(Brazil) Emerson Santos	(Brazil) Internacional	Loan.	July 16, 2018	
DF	(Brazil) Thiago Martins	(Japan) Yokohama F. Marinos	Loan.	August 14, 2018	

=== Transfer summary ===
==== Expenditure ====
Summer: R$0

Winter: ▼ R$2m

Total: ▼ R$2m

==== Income ====
Summer: ▲ R$79.2m

Winter: ▲ R$48m

Total: ▲ R$127.2m

==== Net totals ====
Summer: ▲ R$79.2m

Winter: ▲ R$46m

Total: ▲ R$125.2m ($31m USD)

== Competitions ==
=== Overview ===
Competition	First match	Last match	Starting round	Final position	Record							
Competition	First match	Last match	Starting round	Final position	Pld	W	D	L	GF	GA	GD	Win %
Série A	16 April 2018	2 December 2018	Matchday 1	Winners	38	23	11	4	64	26	+38	60.53
Copa do Brasil	9 May 2018	26 September 2018	Round of 16	Semi-Finals	6	2	3	1	5	3	+2	33.33
Campeonato Paulista	18 January 2018	8 April 2018	Matchday 1	Runners-up	18	12	2	4	30	11	+19	66.67
Copa Libertadores	1 March 2018	31 October 2018	Group stage	Semi-Finals	12	8	2	2	22	8	+14	66.67
Total					74	45	18	11	121	48	+73	60.81

Source: Competitions

=== Friendlies ===
January 12 Closed-door	Palmeiras	1–0	Atibaia	São Paulo
16:00 (UTC−2)	Willian	Report		Stadium: Academia de Futebol
Note: Match was disputed with three halves.

=== Mid-season friendlies ===
During the break for the 2018 FIFA World Cup, Palmeiras disputed three friendly matches, two in Panama and one in Costa Rica.

June 30	Árabe Unido (Panama)	0–2	(Brazil) Palmeiras	Panama City, Panama
21:30 UTC−3	Brown (yellow card) 55'	Report	Hyoran 12'; Willian 22'; (yellow card) 49'; Thiago Santos (yellow card) 67'	Stadium: Estadio Rommel Fernández; Referee: Victor Rios (Panama)

July 4	Independiente Medellín (Colombia)	0–2	(Brazil) Palmeiras	Panama City, Panama
22:00 UTC−3	Moreno (yellow card) 71'; Anchico (yellow card) 84'; Mosquera (yellow card) 89'	Report	Bruno Henrique 17'; Felipe Melo (yellow card) 43'; Deyverson 63'; Antônio Carlos (yellow card) 85'; Thiago Santos (yellow card) 90+1'	Stadium: Estadio Rommel Fernández

July 8	Alajuelense (Costa Rica)	0–6	(Brazil) Palmeiras	La Sabana, Costa Rica
14:00 UTC−3		Report	Bruno Henrique 15'; Hyoran 41', 57', 59'; Gustavo Scarpa 55', 67'	Stadium: Estadio Nacional de Costa Rica

=== Campeonato Paulista ===
==== First stage ====
Palmeiras was drawn on the Group C.

Pos	Team	Pld	W	D	L	GF	GA	GD	Pts	Qualification
1	Palmeiras	12	8	2	2	19	8	+11	26	knockout stage
2	Novorizontino	12	6	2	4	18	17	+1	20	knockout stage
3	São Bento	12	4	5	3	11	8	+3	17	
4	Ferroviária	12	2	7	3	11	12	−1	13	

Source: Soccerway

January 18 1	Palmeiras	3–1	Santo André	São Paulo
19:30 (UTC−2)	Willian 27'; Lucas Lima 36'; Keno 83'	Report	João Lucas 58'; Walterson (yellow card) 66'	Stadium: Allianz Parque; Attendance: 31,678; Referee: Salim Fende Chavez

January 21 2	Botafogo-SP	0–1	Palmeiras	Ribeirão Preto
17:00 (UTC−2)		Report	Borja 53'	Stadium: Santa Cruz; Attendance: 18,194; Referee: Raphael Claus

January 25 3	Palmeiras	2–1	Red Bull Brasil	São Paulo
21:00 (UTC−2)	Thiago Santos 45+2', 87', (yellow card) 46'; Victor Luis (yellow card) 58'	Report	Deivid 23'; Nininho (yellow card) 39'; Rodrigo Andrade (yellow card) 66' (yellow-red card) 79'; Júlio César (yellow card) 68'; Éder (yellow card) 81'	Stadium: Allianz Parque; Attendance: 26,559; Referee: José Cláudio Rocha Filho

January 28 4	Bragantino	0–2	Palmeiras	Bragança Paulista
17:00 (UTC−2)	Ewerton (yellow card) 10'; Adenilson (yellow card) 32'; Lázaro (yellow card) 84'	Report	Keno 63'; Dudu 71'	Stadium: Nabi Abi Chedid; Attendance: 7,775; Referee: Vinicius Gonçalves Dias Araujo

February 4 5	Palmeiras	2–1	Santos	São Paulo
17:00 (UTC−2)	Antônio Carlos 2'; Lucas Lima (yellow card) 25'; Tchê Tchê (yellow card) 45+1'; Borja 49'; Felipe Melo (yellow card) 72'; Victor Luis (yellow card) 89'	Report	Caju (yellow card) 5'; Arthur Gomes (yellow card) 36'; Renato 62'; Alison (yellow card) 71'; Copete (yellow card) 79'	Stadium: Allianz Parque; Attendance: 37,867; Referee: Flávio Rodrigues de Souza

February 10 6	Mirassol	0–2	Palmeiras	Mirassol
19:00 (UTC−2)	Douglas Baggio (yellow card) 15'; Paulinho (yellow card) 45'; Jesiel (yellow card) 84'; André Luis (yellow card) 87'	Report	Borja 23'; Antônio Carlos (yellow card) 30'; Dudu 85' (pen.); Felipe Melo (yellow card) 86'	Stadium: Municipal José Maria de Campos Maia; Attendance: 11,967; Referee: Luiz Flávio de Oliveira

February 15 7	Palmeiras	2–2	Linense	São Paulo
21:00 (UTC−2)	Borja 3', 51', (yellow card) 42'; Felipe Melo (yellow card) 90+1'	Report	Adalberto 43'; Marcão Silva (yellow card) 61'; Murilo Henrique 75'	Stadium: Allianz Parque; Attendance: 25,712; Referee: Lucas Canetto Bellote

February 18 8	Ponte Preta	0–0	Palmeiras	Campinas
19:30 (UTC−3)	Fellipe Cardoso (yellow card) 35'; João Vitor (yellow card) 66'; Marciel (yellow card) 76'	Report	Michel Bastos (yellow card) 23'; Antônio Carlos (yellow card) 78'	Stadium: Moisés Lucarelli; Attendance: 3,401; Referee: Vinicius Gonçalves Dias Araujo

February 24 9	Corinthians	2–0	Palmeiras	São Paulo
17:00 (UTC−3)	Fagner (yellow card) 25'; Rodriguinho 39'; Clayson (yellow card) 73', (goal) 83' (pen.)	Report	Lucas Lima (yellow card) 26'; Jailson (red card) 60'; Dudu (yellow card) 80'; Borja (yellow card) 90+1'	Stadium: Arena Corinthians; Attendance: 42,178; Referee: Raphael Claus

March 5 10	Palmeiras	0–1	São Caetano	São Paulo
20:30 (UTC−3)	Moisés (yellow card) 85'; Gustavo Scarpa (yellow card) 90+4'	Report	Chiquinho 6'; Esley (yellow card) 84'; Paes (yellow card) 90+2'; Alex Reinaldo (yellow card) 90+2'	Stadium: Allianz Parque; Attendance: 22,597; Referee: Vinicius Furlan

March 8 11	Palmeiras	2–0	São Paulo	São Paulo
20:30 (UTC−3)	Antônio Carlos 9'; Victor Luis (yellow card) 19'; Borja 31'; Felipe Melo (yellow card) 37'; Bruno Henrique (yellow card) 66'; Thiago Martins (yellow card) 70'	Report	Marcos Guilherme (yellow card) 19'; Hudson (yellow card) 28'; Petros (yellow card) 76'; Shaylon (yellow card) 80'	Stadium: Allianz Parque; Attendance: 34,916; Referee: Flávio Rodrigues de Souza

March 11 12	Ituano	0–3	Palmeiras	Itu
17:00 (UTC−3)	Marcos Serrato (yellow card) 39'	Report	Gustavo Scarpa 43', 62'; Fernando (yellow card) 78', (goal) 79'	Stadium: Novelli Júnior; Attendance: 7,604; Referee: Vinicius Gonçalves Dias Araujo

==== Quarterfinal ====
March 17 First leg	Novorizontino	0–3	Palmeiras	Novo Horizonte
19:00 UTC−3	Tony (yellow card) 18'; Cléo Silva (yellow card) 41'	Report	Dudu 20' (pen.); Victor Luis (yellow card) 45'; Thiago Martins (yellow card) 55'; Borja (yellow card) 62'; Antônio Carlos (yellow card) 75'; Willian 76'; Bruno Henrique (yellow card) 87'; Keno 88'	Stadium: Doutor Jorge Ismael de Biasi; Attendance: 8,121; Referee: Flávio Rodrigues de Souza

March 21 Second leg	Palmeiras	5–0 (8–0 agg.)	Novorizontino	São Paulo
21:45 UTC−3	Bruno Henrique 6'; Keno 18'; Willian 34'; Dudu 45+1'; Papagaio 79'	Report	Éder (yellow card) 32'; Thallyson (yellow card) 43'; Alisson Safira (yellow card) 50'; Jonatan Lima (yellow card) 55' (yellow-red card) 63'	Stadium: Allianz Parque; Attendance: 25,446; Referee: Vinicius Furlan

==== Semifinal ====
March 24 First leg	Santos	0–1	Palmeiras	São Paulo
19:00 UTC−3	Daniel Guedes (yellow card) 32'; Alison (yellow card) 42'	Report	Willian 11'; Antônio Carlos (yellow card) 33'; Thiago Santos (yellow card) 90'; Dudu (yellow card) 90+4'	Stadium: Pacaembu; Attendance: 16,916; Referee: Flávio Rodrigues de Souza

March 27 Second leg	Palmeiras	1–2 (2–2 agg.) (5–3 p)	Santos	São Paulo
20:30 UTC−3	Bruno Henrique 16'; Willian (yellow card) 36'; Felipe Melo (yellow card) 49'	Report	Eduardo Sasha 13', (yellow card) 35'; Alison (yellow card) 14'; Rodrygo 39'; Lucas Veríssimo (yellow card) 41'; David Braz (yellow card) 44'; Daniel Guedes (yellow card) 83'	Stadium: Pacaembu; Attendance: 34,743; Referee: Marcelo Aparecido Ribeiro de Souza
	Penalties
	Dudu (penalty scored); Tchê Tchê (penalty scored); Victor Luis (penalty scored); Moisés (penalty scored); Guerra (penalty scored)		(penalty scored) Gabriel; (penalty scored) Jean Mota; (penalty missed) Diogo Vitor; (penalty scored) Arthur Gomes

==== Final ====
March 31 First leg	Corinthians	0–1	Palmeiras	São Paulo
16:30 UTC−3	Henrique (yellow card) 45+3'; Clayson (red card) 45+3'; Romero (yellow card) 58'; Gabriel (yellow card) 70'; Maycon (yellow card) 73'	Report	Borja 6', (yellow card) 45+3'; Willian (yellow card) 23'; Felipe Melo (red card) 45+3'; Lucas Lima (yellow card) 53'; Bruno Henrique (yellow card) 67'; Dudu (yellow card) 72'; Thiago Santos (yellow card) 75'	Stadium: Arena Corinthians; Attendance: 43,535; Referee: Leandro Bizzio Marinho

April 8 Second leg	Palmeiras	0–1 (1–1 agg.) (3–4 p)	Corinthians	São Paulo
16:00 UTC−3	Dudu (yellow card) 54'; Moisés (yellow card) 78'	Report	Rodriguinho 1', (yellow card) 90+8'; Cássio (yellow card) 16'; Romero (yellow card) 51'; Fagner (yellow card) 65'; Balbuena (yellow card) 71'	Stadium: Allianz Parque; Attendance: 41,227; Referee: Marcelo Aparecido Ribeiro de Souza
	Penalties
	Dudu (penalty missed); Victor Luis (penalty scored); Lucas Lima (penalty missed); Marcos Rocha (penalty scored); Moisés (penalty scored)		(penalty scored) Danilo; (penalty scored) Romero; (penalty scored) Lucca; (penalty missed) Fagner; (penalty scored) Maycon

=== Copa Libertadores ===
==== Group stage ====
The draw was held on December 20, 2017. Palmeiras was drawn on Group 8.

Pos	Team	Pld	W	D	L	GF	GA	GD	Pts	Qualification
1	(Brazil) Palmeiras	6	5	1	0	14	3	+11	16	Round of 16
2	(Argentina) Boca Juniors	6	2	3	1	8	4	+4	9	Round of 16
3	(Colombia) Junior	6	2	1	3	5	8	−3	7	Copa Sudamericana
4	(Peru) Alianza Lima	6	0	1	5	1	13	−12	1	

Source: CONMEBOL
Rules for classification: Group stage tiebreakers

March 1 1	Junior (Colombia)	0–3	(Brazil) Palmeiras	Barranquilla, Colombia
21:30 (UTC−3)	Gutiérrez (red card) 9'; Piedrahita (yellow card) 38'	Report	Bruno Henrique 19', 70', (yellow card) 35'; Borja (yellow card) 44', (goal) 51'	Stadium: Estadio Metropolitano Roberto Meléndez; Referee: Enrique Cáceres (Paraguay)

April 3 2	Palmeiras (Brazil)	2–0	(Peru) Alianza Lima	São Paulo, Brazil
21:30 (UTC−3)	Thiago Martins 10'; Borja 45'; Felipe Melo (yellow card) 82'	Report	Duclós (yellow card) 28'	Stadium: Allianz Parque; Attendance: 30,456; Referee: José Argote (Venezuela)

April 11 3	Palmeiras (Brazil)	1–1	(Argentina) Boca Juniors	São Paulo, Brazil
21:45 (UTC−3)	Felipe Melo (yellow card) 12'; Keno 89', (yellow card) 90'	Report	Magallán (yellow card) 37'; Tevez 90+1'	Stadium: Allianz Parque; Attendance: 37,192; Referee: Andrés Cunha (Uruguay)

April 25 4	Boca Juniors (Argentina)	0–2	(Brazil) Palmeiras	Buenos Aires, Argentina
21:45 (UTC−3)	Ábila (yellow card) 40'; Magallán (yellow card) 41'; Pérez (yellow card) 77'; Nández (yellow card) 86'	Report	Keno 39', (yellow card) 54'; Lucas Lima 66'; Marcos Rocha (yellow card) 75'; Hyoran (yellow card) 87'	Stadium: La Bombonera; Referee: Roberto Tobar (Chile)

May 3 5	Alianza Lima (Peru)	1–3	(Brazil) Palmeiras	Lima, Peru
21:30 (UTC−3)	Garro (yellow card) 30'; Velarde (yellow card) 38'; Duclós (yellow card) 52'; Cruzado 71' (pen.); Quevedo (yellow card) 83'	Report	Willian 19'; Hyoran 31'; Borja 66'; Luan (yellow card) 70'	Stadium: Estadio Alejandro Villanueva; Referee: Gery Vargas (Bolivia)

May 16 6	Palmeiras (Brazil)	3–1	(Colombia) Junior	São Paulo, Brazil
21:45 (UTC−3)	Emerson Santos (yellow card) 41'; Borja 51', 59', 68'	Report	Gutiérrez 66'; Piedrahita (yellow card) 78'	Stadium: Allianz Parque; Attendance: 25,787; Referee: Enrique Cáceres (Paraguay)

==== Round of 16 ====
The draw for the round of 16 was held on 4 June 2018, 20:00 PYT (UTC−4), at the CONMEBOL Convention Centre in Luque, Paraguay.

August 9 First leg	Cerro Porteño (Paraguay)	0–2	(Brazil) Palmeiras	Asunción, Paraguay
21:45 UTC−3	Rojas (yellow card) 34'; Palau (yellow card) 53'; Churín (yellow card) 72'	Report	Moisés (yellow card) 1'; Borja 46', 70'; Dudu (yellow card) 73'	Stadium: Estadio General Pablo Rojas; Referee: Fernando Rapallini (Argentina)

August 30 Second leg	Palmeiras (Brazil)	0–1 (2–1 agg.)	(Paraguay) Cerro Porteño	São Paulo, Brazil
21:45 UTC−3	Felipe Melo (red card) 5'; Deyverson (red card) 90+3'; Edu Dracena (yellow card) 90+5'	Report	Churín (yellow card) 8'; Arzamendia 56'; Rojas (yellow card) 64'; Novick (yellow card) 89'; Cáceres (red card) 90+3'; Escobar (yellow card) 90+3'; Palau (yellow card) 90+9'	Stadium: Allianz Parque; Attendance: 33,204; Referee: Germán Delfino (Argentina)

==== Quarterfinal ====
September 20 First leg	Colo-Colo (Chile)	0–2	(Brazil) Palmeiras	Santiago, Chile
21:45 UTC−3	Baeza (yellow card) 66'; Insaurralde (yellow card) 80'; Pérez (red card) 90+7'	Report	Bruno Henrique 2', (yellow card) 38'; Thiago Santos (yellow card) 45+1'; Dudu 77'	Stadium: Estadio Monumental David Arellano; Referee: Andrés Cunha (Uruguay)

October 3 Second leg	Palmeiras (Brazil)	2–0 (4–0 agg.)	(Chile) Colo-Colo	São Paulo, Brazil
21:45 UTC−3	Dudu 36'; Borja 52' (pen.)	Report	Zaldivia (yellow card) 26'	Stadium: Allianz Parque; Attendance: 37,950; Referee: Wilmar Roldán (Colombia)

==== Semifinal ====
October 24 First leg	Boca Juniors (Argentina)	2–0	(Brazil) Palmeiras	Buenos Aires, Argentina
21:45 UTC−3	Zárate (yellow card) 22'; Olaza (yellow card) 28'; Villa (yellow card) 62'; Benedetto 83', 87'	Report	Bruno Henrique (yellow card) 21'; Gómez (yellow card) 29'	Stadium: La Bombonera; Referee: Roberto Tobar (Chile)

October 31 Second leg	Palmeiras (Brazil)	2–2 (2–4 agg.)	(Argentina) Boca Juniors	São Paulo, Brazil
21:45 UTC−3	Felipe Melo (yellow card) 26'; Luan (yellow card) 41', (goal) 52'; Gómez 60' (pen.), (yellow card) 75'	Report	Ábila 17', (yellow card) 56'; Pérez (yellow card) 67'; Benedetto 69'	Stadium: Allianz Parque; Attendance: 40,299; Referee: Wilmar Roldán (Colombia)

=== Campeonato Brasileiro ===
==== Standings ====
Pos	Team	Pld	W	D	L	GF	GA	GD	Pts	Qualification or relegation
1	Palmeiras (C)	38	23	11	4	64	26	+38	80	Qualification for Copa Libertadores group stage
2	Flamengo	38	21	9	8	59	29	+30	72	Qualification for Copa Libertadores group stage
3	Internacional	38	19	12	7	51	29	+22	69	Qualification for Copa Libertadores group stage
4	Grêmio	38	18	12	8	48	27	+21	66	Qualification for Copa Libertadores group stage
5	São Paulo	38	16	15	7	46	34	+12	63	Qualification for Copa Libertadores second stage

Source: CBF
Rules for classification: 1) points; 2) wins; 3) goal difference; 4) goals scored; 5) head-to-head results; 6) least red cards received; 7) least yellow cards received; 8) draw.
(C) Champions

==== Matches ====
The match schedule was released on February 5, 2018.

April 16 1	Botafogo	1–1	Palmeiras	Rio de Janeiro
20:00 UTC−3	Igor Rabello 81'; Marcinho (yellow card) 90+2'	Report	Diogo Barbosa (yellow card) 33'; Guerra 53'; Marcos Rocha (yellow card) 63'; Felipe Melo (yellow card) 67'; Dudu (yellow card) 80'	Stadium: Engenhão; Attendance: 7,020; Referee: Ricardo Marques (Minas Gerais)

April 22 2	Palmeiras	1–0	Internacional	São Paulo
16:00 UTC−3	Dudu 39'; Bruno Henrique (yellow card) 42'; Felipe Melo (yellow card) 90+1'	Report	Iago (yellow card) 37'; Rodrigo Dourado (yellow card) 78'	Stadium: Pacaembu; Attendance: 23,236; Referee: Marcelo de Lima Henrique (Rio de Janeiro)

April 29 3	Palmeiras	0–0	Chapecoense	São Paulo
16:00 UTC−3	Diogo Barbosa (yellow card) 53'; Dudu (yellow card) 53'; Borja (yellow card) 60'; Deyverson (yellow card) 71'	Report	Wellington Paulista (yellow card) 28'; Rafael Thyere (yellow card) 39'; Arthur (yellow card) 42'; Bruno Pacheco (yellow card) 54'; Amaral (yellow card) 70'; Elicarlos (yellow card) 81'	Stadium: Allianz Parque; Attendance: 30,617; Referee: Igor Junio Benevenuto (Minas Gerais)

May 6 4	Atlético Paranaense	1–3	Palmeiras	Curitiba
16:00 UTC−3	Thiago Carleto (yellow card) 8'; Pablo 89'	Report	Felipe Melo (yellow card) 8'; Bruno Henrique 43'; Lucas Lima (yellow card) 55'; Marcos Rocha 59'; Willian 84'	Stadium: Arena da Baixada; Attendance: 20,417; Referee: Cláudio Francisco Lima e Silva (Sergipe)

May 13 5	Corinthians	1–0	Palmeiras	São Paulo
16:00 UTC−3	Rodriguinho 37'; Maycon (yellow card) 80'; Mantuan (yellow card) 85'	Report	Edu Dracena (yellow card) 18'; Borja (yellow card) 73'; Dudu (yellow card) 81'	Stadium: Arena Corinthians; Attendance: 34,967; Referee: Anderson Daronco (Rio Grande do Sul)

May 19 6	Palmeiras	3–0	Bahia	São Paulo
21:00 UTC−3	Willian 2'; Antônio Carlos 32', (yellow card) 69'; Borja 41', (yellow card) 43'; Lucas Lima (yellow card) 45+2'	Report	Lucas Fonseca (yellow card) 21'; Gregore (yellow card) 90+1'	Stadium: Allianz Parque; Attendance: 26,351; Referee: Rafael Traci (Paraná)

May 26 7	Palmeiras	2–3	Sport	São Paulo
19:00 UTC−3	Felipe Melo (yellow card) 19'; Keno 32'; Diogo Barbosa (yellow card) 45'; Marcos Rocha (yellow card) 56'; Hyoran 81'	Report	Anselmo 50', 72', (yellow card) 53'; Ernando (yellow card) 75'; Raul Prata (yellow card) 85' (yellow-red card) 90+5'; Rafael Marques 86'	Stadium: Allianz Parque; Attendance: 25,947; Referee: Dewson Fernando Freitas da Silva (Pará)

May 30 8	Cruzeiro	1–0	Palmeiras	Belo Horizonte
21:45 UTC−3	Rafael Sóbis 68'; Thiago Neves (yellow card) 70'; Robinho (yellow card) 81'; Cabral (yellow card) 87'	Report	Willian (yellow card) 43'; Marcos Rocha (yellow card) 44'; Bruno Henrique (yellow card) 56'; Antônio Carlos (yellow card) 77'; Moisés (yellow card) 89'; Thiago Santos (yellow card) 90+1'	Stadium: Mineirão; Attendance: 16,175; Referee: Bráulio da Silva Machado (Santa Catarina)

June 2 9	Palmeiras	3–1	São Paulo	São Paulo
21:00 UTC−3	Felipe Melo (yellow card) 42'; Dudu (yellow card) 43', (goal) 69'; Willian 54', 66'; Jailson (yellow card) 88'; Antônio Carlos (yellow card) 90'	Report	Anderson Martins (yellow card) 11'; Éder Militão (yellow card) 15'; Edu Dracena 29' (o.g.); Bruno Alves (yellow card) 50'; Nenê (yellow card) 71'	Stadium: Allianz Parque; Attendance: 32,841; Referee: Rodolpho Toski Marques (Paraná)

June 6 10	Grêmio	0–2	Palmeiras	Porto Alegre
21:45 UTC−3	Paulo Victor (yellow card) 62'; Luan (yellow card) 72'	Report	Dudu (yellow card) 31'; Felipe Melo (yellow card) 55'; Moisés (yellow card) 60'; Willian 66', 86'; Hyoran (yellow card) 68'; Bruno Henrique (yellow card) 73'	Stadium: Arena do Grêmio; Attendance: 26,566; Referee: Rafael Traci (Paraná)

June 10 11	Ceará	2–2	Palmeiras	Fortaleza
16:00 UTC−3	Felipe Azevedo 25'; Samuel Xavier (yellow card) 58'; Élton (yellow card) 73', (goal) 87'; Pio (yellow card) 83'	Report	Thiago Santos 5'; Dudu 22'; Jean (yellow card) 70'; Willian (yellow card) 85'	Stadium: Castelão; Attendance: 32,081; Referee: Jean Pierre Gonçalves Lima (Rio Grande do Sul)

June 13 12	Palmeiras	1–1	Flamengo	São Paulo
21:00 UTC−3	Willian 5'; Moisés (yellow card) 41'; Felipe Melo (yellow card) 57'; Victor Luis (yellow card) 73'; Marcos Rocha (yellow card) 79'; Dudu (red card) 90+5'; Jailson (red card) 90+6'; Luan (red card) 90+7'	Report	Éverton Ribeiro (yellow card) 29'; Rodinei (yellow card) 42'; Felipe Vizeu (yellow card) 50'; Thuler 54'; Diego Alves (yellow card) 55'; Vinícius Júnior (yellow card) 79'; Cuéllar (red card) 90+5'; Jonas (red card) 90+6'; Henrique Dourado (red card) 90+7'	Stadium: Allianz Parque; Attendance: 36,882; Referee: Bráulio da Silva Machado (Santa Catarina)

July 19 13	Santos	1–1	Palmeiras	São Paulo
20:00 UTC−3	Alison (yellow card) 23'; Jean Mota (yellow card) 31'; Rodrygo (yellow card) 44'; Gustavo Henrique 74'; Léo Cittadini (yellow card) 86'	Report	Lucas Lima 5', (yellow card) 7'; Felipe Melo (yellow card) 14'; Deyverson (yellow card) 44'; Antônio Carlos (yellow card) 55'; Hyoran (yellow card) 61'; Gustavo Scarpa (yellow card) 73'	Stadium: Pacaembu; Attendance: 26,417; Referee: Dewson Fernando Freitas da Silva (Pará)

July 22 14	Palmeiras	3–2	Atlético Mineiro	São Paulo
16:00 UTC−3	Moisés 2', (yellow card) 3'; Bruno Henrique 75', 90+3'; Edu Dracena (yellow card) 90+5'	Report	Luan 50', (yellow card) 52'; Chará 80'; Terans (yellow card) 90+3'; Matheus Galdezani (red card) 90+'	Stadium: Allianz Parque; Attendance: 29,246; Referee: Péricles Bassols (Pernambuco)
Note: Matheus Galdezani was sent off after the match ended.

July 25 15	Fluminense	1–0	Palmeiras	Rio de Janeiro
19:30 UTC−3	Gilberto 42', (yellow card) 65'; Airton (yellow card) 59'	Report	Felipe Melo (yellow card) 7'; Mayke (yellow card) 83'; Edu Dracena (red card) 90'	Stadium: Maracanã; Attendance: 21,462; Referee: Rodrigo D'Alonso Ferreira (Santa Catarina)

July 29 16	Palmeiras	3–0	Paraná	São Paulo
11:00 UTC−3	Bruno Henrique 16', 40'; Diogo Barbosa (yellow card) 26'; Mayke (yellow card) 49'; Lucas Lima 77'	Report	Mansur (yellow card) 67'; Rodolfo (yellow card) 90+2'	Stadium: Allianz Parque; Attendance: 35,776; Referee: Wagner Reway (Mato-Grosso)

August 5 17	América Mineiro	0–0	Palmeiras	Belo Horizonte
16:00 UTC−3	Aderlan (yellow card) 83'	Report	Thiago Santos (yellow card) 16'; Luan (yellow card) 82'	Stadium: Estádio Independência; Attendance: 8,077; Referee: André Luiz de Freitas Castro (Goiás)

August 12 18	Palmeiras	1–0	Vasco	São Paulo
19:00 UTC−3	Deyverson 60'; Luan (yellow card) 70'	Report	Andrey (yellow card) 61'; Maxi López (yellow card) 85'	Stadium: Allianz Parque; Attendance: 30,012; Referee: Wilton Sampaio (Goiás)

August 19 19	Vitória	0–3	Palmeiras	Salvador
16:00 UTC−3	Rodrigo Andrade (yellow card) 33'; Neílton (yellow card)	Report	Deyverson 10', 28'; Bruno Henrique (yellow card) 19'; Dudu 58'	Stadium: Barradão; Attendance: 8,822; Referee: Rodrigo Batista Raposo (Distrito Federal)

August 22 20	Palmeiras	2–0	Botafogo	São Paulo
21:00 UTC−3	Edu Dracena (yellow card) 72'; Lucas Lima 77', 86'; Dudu (yellow card) 87'	Report	Moisés (yellow card) 41' (yellow-red card) 70'; Bochecha (yellow card) 54'; Brenner (yellow card) 62'; Igor Rabello (yellow card) 81'; Gilson (yellow card) 85'	Stadium: Allianz Parque; Attendance: 24,882; Referee: Anderson Daronco (Rio Grande do Sul)

August 26 21	Internacional	0–0	Palmeiras	Porto Alegre
16:00 UTC−3	Moledo (yellow card) 49'; Iago (yellow card) 90+4'	Report	Gómez (yellow card) 40'; Diogo Barbosa (yellow card) 55'; Marcos Rocha (yellow card) 57'	Stadium: Beira-Rio; Attendance: 38,979; Referee: Bruno Arleu de Araújo (Rio de Janeiro)

September 2 22	Chapecoense	1–2	Palmeiras	Chapecó
19:00 UTC−3	Torres (yellow card) 1'; Leandro Pereira (yellow card) 21'; Osman (yellow card) 44'; Rafael Thyere 60'; Márcio Araújo (yellow card) 66'	Report	Victor Luis (yellow card) 4'; Hyoran 13', (yellow card) 89'; Borja 51'; Diogo Barbosa (yellow card) 55'; Luan (yellow card) 87'	Stadium: Arena Condá; Attendance: 4,546; Referee: Ricardo Marques (Minas Gerais)

September 5 23	Palmeiras	2–0	Atlético Paranaense	São Paulo
21:00 UTC−3	Dudu (yellow card) 45'; Willian 70'; Moisés 90+4' (pen.)	Report	Renan Lodi (yellow card) 62'; Wellington (yellow card) 77'; Santos (yellow card) 90+3'	Stadium: Allianz Parque; Attendance: 24,601; Referee: Marcelo de Lima Henrique (Rio de Janeiro)

September 9 24	Palmeiras	1–0	Corinthians	São Paulo
16:00 UTC−3	Lucas Lima (yellow card) 5'; Deyverson 56', (yellow card) 68'	Report	Danilo Avelar (yellow card) 15'; Roger (yellow card) 64'; Ralf (yellow card) 76'	Stadium: Allianz Parque; Attendance: 38,568; Referee: Jean Pierre Gonçalves Lima (Rio Grande do Sul)

September 16 25	Bahia	1–1	Palmeiras	Salvador
16:00 UTC−3	Gilberto 17'; Elton (yellow card) 45+1'	Report	Lucas Lima (yellow card) 40'; Bruno Henrique (yellow card) 51'; Felipe Melo 77'	Stadium: Arena Fonte Nova; Attendance: 24,951; Referee: Héber Lopes (Santa Catarina)

September 23 26	Sport	0–1	Palmeiras	Recife
18:00 UTC−3	Jair (yellow card) 38'; Ronaldo Alves (yellow card) 61'	Report	Felipe Melo (yellow card) 10'; Willian 80'; Luan (yellow card) 85'	Stadium: Ilha do Retiro; Attendance: 18,681; Referee: Paulo Roberto Alves Júnior (Paraná)

September 30 27	Palmeiras	3–1	Cruzeiro	São Paulo
11:00 UTC−3	Lucas Lima 22'; Gómez (yellow card) 29', (goal) 65' (pen.); Felipe Melo (yellow card) 36'; Hyoran 41', (yellow card) 72'; Deyverson (yellow card) 90+4'; Moisés (yellow card) 90+4'	Report	Mancuello (yellow card) 18', (goal) 30' (pen.); Ezequiel (yellow card) 68'; Marcelo Hermes (yellow card) 82'; Fred (yellow card) 82'; Léo (yellow card) 87'; Manoel (yellow card) 90'	Stadium: Pacaembu; Attendance: 35,654; Referee: Dewson Fernando Freitas da Silva (Pará)

October 6 28	São Paulo	0–2	Palmeiras	São Paulo
18:00 UTC−3	Rodrigo Caio (yellow card) 16'; Rojas (yellow card) 41'	Report	Victor Luis (yellow card) 18'; Felipe Melo (yellow card) 25'; Gómez 33'; Deyverson 37'; Dudu (yellow card) 48'	Stadium: Morumbi; Attendance: 56,694; Referee: Wilton Sampaio (Goiás)

October 14 29	Palmeiras	2–0	Grêmio	São Paulo
16:00 UTC−3	Deyverson 7', 78'; Thiago Santos (yellow card) 35'; Gómez (yellow card) 47'; Luan (yellow card) 64'; Jailson (yellow card) 81'	Report	Bressan (yellow card) 58'; Marcelo Oliveira (yellow card) 76'	Stadium: Pacaembu; Attendance: 32,015; Referee: Ricardo Marques (Minas Gerais)

October 21 30	Palmeiras	2–1	Ceará	São Paulo
16:00 UTC−3	Bruno Henrique (yellow card) 1', (goal) 17' (pen.), 34'; Diogo Barbosa (yellow card) 10'; Deyverson (red card) 45'; Hyoran (yellow card) 49'; Mayke (yellow card) 73'; Lucas Lima (yellow card) 78'	Report	Arthur 54'; Samuel Xavier (yellow card) 10'; Richardson (yellow card) 72'	Stadium: Pacaembu; Attendance: 33,355; Referee: André Luiz de Freitas Castro (Goiás)

October 27 31	Flamengo	1–1	Palmeiras	Rio de Janeiro
19:00 UTC−3	Renê (yellow card) 57'; Moreno 80', (yellow card) 90+4'	Report	Dudu 49'; Antônio Carlos (yellow card) 57'; Thiago Santos (yellow card) 58'; Weverton (yellow card) 84'; Moisés (yellow card) 90+1'; Victor Luis (yellow card) 90+4'	Stadium: Maracanã; Attendance: 58,613; Referee: Rafael Traci (Paraná)

November 3 32	Palmeiras	3–2	Santos	São Paulo
19:00 UTC−3	Dudu 13', (yellow card) 90'; Edu Dracena (yellow card) 33', (goal) 39'; Lucas Lima (yellow card) 51'; Victor Luis 70'	Report	Luiz Felipe (yellow card) 7'; González (yellow card) 21'; Gabriel (yellow card) 22'; Copete 54'; Victor Ferraz (yellow card) 56'; Dodô 64'; Diego Pituca (yellow card) 69' (yellow-red card) 79'	Stadium: Allianz Parque; Attendance: 38,938; Referee: Bráulio da Silva Machado (Santa Catarina)

November 11 33	Atlético Mineiro	1–1	Palmeiras	Belo Horizonte
17:00 UTC−2	Ricardo Oliveira (yellow card) 28'; Elias 63'; Iago Maidana (yellow card) 73'; Adilson (yellow card) 75'	Report	Felipe Melo (yellow card) 28'; Bruno Henrique 76' (pen.); Edu Dracena (yellow card) 88'	Stadium: Independência; Attendance: 20,488; Referee: Wilton Sampaio (Goiás)

November 14 34	Palmeiras	3–0	Fluminense	São Paulo
21:45 UTC−2	Borja (yellow card) 26', (goal) 40'; Diogo Barbosa (yellow card) 58'; Thiago Santos (yellow card) 59'; Lucas Lima (yellow card) 71'; Felipe Melo 82'; Luan (yellow card) 87', (goal) 89'; Gustavo Scarpa (yellow card) 90+2'	Report	Paulo Ricardo (yellow card) 8'; Richard (yellow card) 30'; Jadson (yellow card) 32' (yellow-red card) 90'; Digão (yellow card) 78'; Kayke (yellow card) 84'	Stadium: Allianz Parque; Attendance: 37,430; Referee: Bráulio da Silva Machado (Santa Catarina)

November 18 35	Paraná	1–1	Palmeiras	Londrina
17:00 UTC−2	Keslley 34', (yellow card) 42'; Jhony (yellow card) 35'; Igor (yellow card) 78'; Renê (yellow card) 90+4'	Report	Gustavo Scarpa 53' (pen.), (yellow card) 56'; Borja (yellow card) 90+5'	Stadium: Estádio do Café; Attendance: 25,076; Referee: Bruno Arleu de Araújo (Rio de Janeiro)

November 21 36	Palmeiras	4–0	América Mineiro	São Paulo
21:45 UTC−2	Luan 58'; Willian 75'; Dudu 77'; Deyverson 81'	Report	Ademir (yellow card) 13'; Ricardo Silva (yellow card) 15'; Norberto (yellow card) 31'; Carlinhos (yellow card) 51'; Matheus Ferraz (yellow card) 54'; Leandro Donizete (yellow card) 62'	Stadium: Allianz Parque; Attendance: 39,429; Referee: Paulo Roberto Alves Júnior (Paraná)

November 25 37	Vasco	0–1	Palmeiras	Rio de Janeiro
17:00 UTC−2	Desábato (yellow card) 14'; Leandro Castán (yellow card) 16'; Andrey (yellow card) 80'; Ríos (yellow card) 82'; Yago Pikachu (red card) 90+2'	Report	Felipe Melo (yellow card) 25'; Bruno Henrique (yellow card) 29'; Gómez (yellow card) 54'; Deyverson 71', (yellow card) 73'; Jean (yellow card) 90+2'	Stadium: São Januário; Attendance: 21,066; Referee: Rafael Traci (Paraná)

December 2 38	Palmeiras	3–2	Vitória	São Paulo
17:00 UTC−2	Edu Dracena 42'; Deyverson (yellow card) 55'; Gustavo Scarpa 56'; Felipe Melo (yellow card) 81'; Bruno Henrique 89'	Report	Lucas Ribeiro (yellow card) 27'; Luan (yellow card) 58', (goal) 72'; Yago 70' (pen.)	Stadium: Allianz Parque; Attendance: 41,256; Referee: Héber Lopes (Santa Catarina)

==== Results by round ====
Round	1	2	3	4	5	6	7	8	9	10	11	12	13	14	15	16	17	18	19	20	21	22	23	24	25	26	27	28	29	30	31	32	33	34	35	36	37	38
Result	D	W	D	W	L	W	L	L	W	W	D	D	D	W	L	W	D	W	W	W	D	W	W	W	D	W	W	W	W	W	D	W	D	W	D	W	W	W
Position	11	5	7	2	5	4	6	10	7	3	6	6	7	5	7	6	5	5	5	5	4	5	3	3	3	2	1	1	1	1	1	1	1	1	1	1	1	1

Source: CBF
W = Win; D = Draw; L = Loss

=== Copa do Brasil ===
As a team that disputed the Copa Libertadores, Palmeiras entered in the round of 16. The draw was held on April 20, 2018.

==== Round of 16 ====
May 9 First leg	América Mineiro (Minas Gerais)	1–2	(São Paulo (state)) Palmeiras	Belo Horizonte
19:30 UTC−3	Rafael Lima (yellow card) 28'; Leandro Donizete (yellow card) 67'; Serginho 72'	Report	Borja 37'; Keno 56'	Stadium: Estádio Independência; Attendance: 12,241; Referee: Bráulio da Silva Machado (Santa Catarina)

May 23 Second leg	Palmeiras (São Paulo (state))	1–1 (3–2 agg.)	(Minas Gerais) América Mineiro	São Paulo
21:45 UTC−3	Lucas Lima (yellow card) 23'; Willian 63'; Felipe Melo (yellow card) 65'	Report	Serginho 37'; Leandro Donizete (yellow card) 47'; Aderlan (yellow card) 80'	Stadium: Allianz Parque; Attendance: 22,831; Referee: Jean Pierre Gonçalves Lima (Rio Grande do Sul)

==== Quarterfinal ====
The draw for the quarterfinal was held on May 30, 2018.

August 2 First leg	Bahia	0–0	(São Paulo (state)) Palmeiras	Salvador
19:15 UTC−3	Zé Rafael (yellow card) 53'; Bruno (yellow card) 62'; Tiago (yellow card) 65'; Gregore (yellow card) 74'	Report	Diogo Barbosa (yellow card) 21'; Felipe Melo (yellow card) 58'; Deyverson (red card) 90'	Stadium: Arena Fonte Nova; Attendance: 27,014; Referee: Anderson Daronco (Rio Grande do Sul)

August 16 Second leg	Palmeiras (São Paulo (state))	1–0 (1–0 agg.)	Bahia	São Paulo
19:15 UTC−3	Felipe Melo (yellow card) 42'; Dudu 73'; Borja (yellow card) 81'	Report	Bruno (yellow card) 38'; Nino Paraíba (yellow card) 58'	Stadium: Pacaembu; Attendance: 28,057; Referee: Marcelo de Lima Henrique (Rio de Janeiro)

==== Semifinal ====
A draw was held on August 22, 2018 to define the order of the matches.

September 12 First leg	Palmeiras (São Paulo (state))	0–1	(Minas Gerais) Cruzeiro	São Paulo
21:45 UTC−3	Thiago Santos (yellow card) 15'; Dudu (yellow card) 45+3'	Report	Barcos 4'; Léo (yellow card) 45+1'; Fábio (yellow card) 54'; Edílson (yellow card) 80' (red card) 81'	Stadium: Allianz Parque; Attendance: 31,960; Referee: Wagner Reway (Mato Grosso)

September 26 Second leg	Cruzeiro (Minas Gerais)	1–1 (2–1 agg.)	(São Paulo (state)) Palmeiras	Belo Horizonte
21:45 UTC−3	Barcos 26'; Egídio (yellow card) 29'; Sassá (red card) 90+'	Report	Borja (yellow card) 30'; Felipe Melo (yellow card) 46', (goal) 49'; Deyverson (yellow card) 86'; Willian (yellow card) 90+7'; Mayke (red card) 90+'; Diogo Barbosa (red card) 90+'	Stadium: Mineirão; Attendance: 44,681; Referee: Wagner do Nascimento Magalhães (Rio de Janeiro)
Note: Sassá, Mayke and Diogo Barbosa were sent off after the end of the match.

== Statistics ==
=== Overall statistics ===
Games played	74 (18 Campeonato Paulista, 12 Copa Libertadores, 38 Campeonato Brasileiro Série A, 6 Copa do Brasil)
Games won	45 (12 Campeonato Paulista, 8 Copa Libertadores, 23 Campeonato Brasileiro, 2 Copa do Brasil)
Games drawn	18 (2 Campeonato Paulista, 2 Copa Libertadores, 11 Campeonato Brasileiro, 3 Copa do Brasil)
Games lost	11 (4 Campeonato Paulista, 2 Copa Libertadores, 4 Campeonato Brasileiro, 1 Copa do Brasil)
Goals scored	121
Goals conceded	48
Goal difference	+72 (+19 Campeonato Paulista, +14 Copa Libertadores, +38 Campeonato Brasileiro, +1 Copa do Brasil)
Best result	5–0 (vs. Novorizontino – March 21, Campeonato Paulista)
Worst result	0–2 (vs. Corinthians – Campeonato Paulista, February 24); 0–2 (vs. Boca Juniors – Copa Libertadores, October 24)
Yellow cards	187
Red cards	12
Clean sheets	36
Most clean sheets	Jailson
Top scorer	Miguel Borja (20 goals)

=== Goalscorers ===
In italic players who left the team in mid-season.

Place	Position	Nationality	Number	Name	Campeonato Paulista	Copa Libertadores	Série A	Copa do Brasil	Total
1	FW	(Colombia)	9	Borja	7	9	3	1	20
2	FW	(Brazil)	29	Willian	4	1	10	1	16
3	FW	(Brazil)	7	Dudu	4	2	7	1	14
3	MF	(Brazil)	19	Bruno Henrique	2	3	9	0	14
4	FW	(Brazil)	16	Deyverson	0	0	9	0	9
5	FW	(Brazil)	11	Keno	4	2	1	1	8
6	MF	(Brazil)	20	Lucas Lima	1	1	5	0	7
7	MF	(Brazil)	28	Hyoran	0	1	3	0	4
7	MF	(Brazil)	14	Gustavo Scarpa	2	0	2	0	4
8	DF	(Brazil)	25	Antônio Carlos	2	0	1	0	3
8	MF	(Brazil)	5	Thiago Santos	2	0	1	0	3
8	DF	(Paraguay)	15	G. Gómez	0	1	2	0	3
8	MF	(Brazil)	30	Felipe Melo	0	0	2	1	3
8	DF	(Brazil)	13	Luan	0	1	2	0	3
9	MF	(Brazil)	10	Moisés	0	0	2	0	2
9	DF	(Brazil)	3	Edu Dracena	0	0	2	0	2
10	FW	(Brazil)	47	Fernando	1	0	0	0	1
10	FW	(Brazil)	49	Papagaio	1	0	0	0	1
10	DF	(Brazil)	31	Thiago Martins	0	1	0	0	1
10	MF	(Venezuela)	18	Guerra	0	0	1	0	1
10	DF	(Brazil)	22	Marcos Rocha	0	0	1	0	1
10	DF	(Brazil)	26	Victor Luis	0	0	1	0	1

=== Hat-tricks ===
Player	Against	Result	Date	Competition
(Colombia) Borja	(Colombia) Atletico Junior	3–1 (H)	16 May 2018	Copa Libertadores

(H) – Home; (A) – Away

=== Clean sheets ===
Last updated on 9 September 2018.

Rank	Name	Campeonato Brasileiro	Copa do Brasil	Copa Libertadores	Paulista Serie A	Total
—	(Brazil) Weverton	8/12	2/2	1/2	0/0	11/16
—	(Brazil) Jailson	4/12	0/2	3/5	10/18	17/27
—	(Brazil) Fernando Prass	1/1	0/0	0/1	0/0	1/2
Total		13/25	2/4	4/8	10/18	29/55
