= 2018 Campeonato Paulista knockout stage =

The knockout stage of the 2018 Campeonato Paulista began on 17 March with the quarter-final and concluded on 8 April 2018 with the final. A total of eight teams competed in the knockout stage. Corinthians were the champions.

== Round and draw dates ==
All draws held at Federação Paulista de Futebol headquarters in São Paulo, Brazil.

Round	Draw date	First leg	Second leg
Quarter-finals	13 March 2018	17–18 March 2018	20–22 March 2018
Semi-finals	22 March 2018	24–25 March 2018	27–28 March 2018
Finals	–	31 March 2018	8 April 2018

== Format ==
Each tie is played over two legs, with the team with the best placing in the general table playing the second leg at home. The quarterfinals are played between the winners and runners-up of each group. In the semifinals the best team (first) will face the team with the worst campaign (fourth), while the second will face the team with the third best campaign.

== Qualified teams ==
Group	Winners	Runners-up
A	Corinthians	Bragantino
B	São Paulo	São Caetano
C	Palmeiras	Novorizontino
D	Santos	Botafogo

=== Bracket ===
Quarterfinals
C1	Palmeiras	3	5	8
C2	Novorizontino	0	0	0
D1	Santos	0	0	0 (3)
D2	Botafogo-SP	0	0	0 (1)
A1	Corinthians	2	2	4
A2	Bragantino	3	0	3
B1	São Paulo	0	2	2
B2	São Caetano	1	0	1

Semifinals
C1	Palmeiras	1	1	2 (5)
D1	Santos	0	2	2 (3)
A1	Corinthians	0	1	1 (5)
B1	São Paulo	1	0	1 (4)

Finals
C1	Palmeiras	1	0	1 (3)
A1	Corinthians	0	1	1 (4)

== Quarterfinals ==
Team 1	Agg.	Team 2	1st leg	2nd leg
Corinthians	4–3	Bragantino	2–3	2–0
São Paulo	2–1	São Caetano	0–1	2–0
Palmeiras	8–0	Novorizontino	3–0	5–0
Santos	0–0 (3–1 p)	Botafogo	0–0	0–0

=== Quarterfinal A ===
March 18, 2018
16:00 UTC−03:00

Bragantino	3 – 2	Corinthians
Matheus Peixoto 45+2'; Vitinho 71'; Italo 76'	Report	66' Balbuena; 88' Pedrinho

Pacaembu Stadium, São Paulo
Attendance: 15,525
Referee: Leandro Bizzio Marinho

March 22, 2018
20:00 UTC−03:00

Corinthians	2 – 0	Bragantino
Sidcley 30'; Maycon 45'	Report

Arena Corinthians, São Paulo
Attendance: 32,930
Referee: Vinicius Gonçalves Dias Araujo

=== Quarterfinal B ===
March 17, 2018
16:00 UTC−03:00

São Caetano	1 – 0	São Paulo
Chiquinho 53'	Report

Estádio Anacleto Campanella, São Caetano do Sul
Attendance: 4,791
Referee: Vinicius Furlan

March 20, 2018
21:00 UTC−03:00

São Paulo	2 – 0	São Caetano
Tréllez 64'; Diego Souza 85'	Report

Estádio do Morumbi, São Paulo
Attendance: 17,899
Referee: Salim Fende Chavez

=== Quarterfinal C ===
March 17, 2018
19:00 UTC−03:00

Novorizontino	0 – 3	Palmeiras
	Report	21' Dudu; 77' Willian; 89' Keno

Estádio Dr. Jorge Ismael de Biasi, Novo Horizonte
Attendance: 8,121
Referee: Flavio Rodrigues de Souza

March 21, 2018
21:45 UTC−03:00

Palmeiras	5 – 0	Novorizontino
Bruno Henrique 6'; Keno 19'; Willian 35'; Dudu 45+1'; Rafael Papagaio 80'	Report

Allianz Parque, São Paulo
Attendance: 25,446
Referee: Vinicius Furlan

=== Quarterfinal D ===
March 18, 2018
19:00 UTC−03:00

Botafogo	0 – 0	Santos
	Report

Estádio Santa Cruz, Ribeirão Preto
Attendance: 11,933
Referee: Raphael Claus

March 21, 2018
19:30 UTC−03:00

Santos	0–0	Botafogo
	Report
Penalties
Gabriel (penalty scored); Vitor Bueno (penalty missed); Diogo Vitor (penalty scored); Lucas Veríssimo (penalty missed); Arthur Gomes (penalty scored)	3–1	(penalty scored) Jheimy; (penalty missed) Bruno Moraes; (penalty missed) Dodô; (penalty missed) Willian

Estádio Urbano Caldeira, Santos
Attendance: 6,209
Referee: Leandro Bizzio Marinho

== Semifinals ==
Team 1	Agg.	Team 2	1st leg	2nd leg
Palmeiras	2–2 (5–3 p)	Santos	1–0	1–2
Corinthians	1–1 (5–4 p)	São Paulo	0–1	1–0

=== Semifinal 1 ===
March 24, 2018
19:00 UTC−03:00

Santos	0–1	Palmeiras
	Report	12' Willian

Pacaembu, São Paulo
Attendance: 19,546
Referee: Flávio Rodrigues de Souza

March 27, 2018
20:30 UTC−03:00

Palmeiras	1–2	Santos
Bruno Henrique 17'	Report	13' Eduardo Sasha; 39' Rodrygo
Penalties
Dudu (penalty scored); Tchê Tchê (penalty scored); Victor Luis (penalty scored); Moisés (penalty scored); Guerra (penalty scored)	5–3	(penalty scored) Gabriel; (penalty scored) Jean Mota; (penalty missed) Diogo Vitor; (penalty scored) Arthur Gomes

Pacaembu, São Paulo
Attendance: 36,591
Referee: Marcelo Aparecido Ribeiro de Souza

=== Semifinal 2 ===
March 25, 2018
16:00 UTC−03:00

São Paulo	1–0	Corinthians
Nenê 45+3'	Report

Estádio do Morumbi, São Paulo
Attendance: 42,830
Referee: Raphael Claus

March 28, 2018
21:45 UTC−03:00

Corinthians	1–0	São Paulo
Rodriguinho 90+3'	Report
Penalties
Mateus Vital (penalty scored); Rodriguinho (penalty missed); Clayson (penalty scored); Pedrinho (penalty scored); Maycon (penalty scored); Danilo (penalty scored)	5–4	(penalty missed) Diego Souza; (penalty scored) Lucas Fernandes; (penalty scored) Bruno Alves; (penalty scored) Reinaldo; (penalty scored) Éder Militão; (penalty missed) Liziero

Arena Corinthians, São Paulo
Attendance: 43,367
Referee: Vinícius Gonçalves Dias Araújo

== Finals ==
Team 1	Agg.	Team 2	1st leg	2nd leg
Palmeiras	1–1 (3–4 p)	Corinthians	1–0	0–1

March 31, 2018
16:30 UTC−03:00

Corinthians	0 - 1	Palmeiras
	Report	6' Miguel Borja

Arena Corinthians, São Paulo
Attendance: 43,905
Referee: Leandro Bizzio Marinho

April 8, 2018
16:00 UTC−03:00

Palmeiras	0–1	Corinthians
	Report	2' Rodriguinho
Penalties
Dudu (penalty missed); Victor Luis (penalty scored); Lucas Lima (penalty missed); Marcos Rocha (penalty scored); Moisés (penalty scored)	3–4	(penalty scored) Danilo; (penalty scored) Romero; (penalty scored) Lucca; (penalty missed) Fagner; (penalty scored) Maycon

Allianz Parque, São Paulo
Attendance: 41,227
Referee: Marcelo Aparecido Ribeiro de Souza
