= Diogo Barbosa (footballer) =

Brazilian footballer (born 1992)

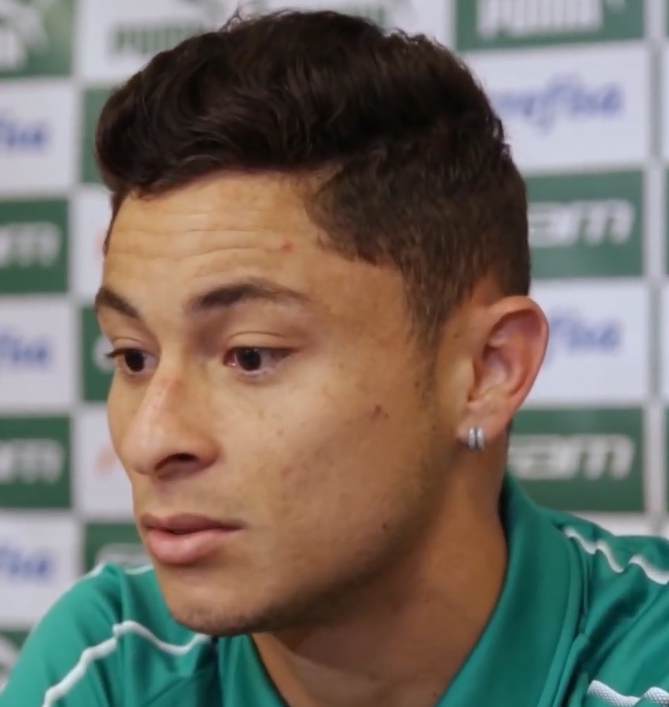
- Diogo Barbosa in 2019

Personal information
- Full name: Diogo Barbosa Mendanha
- Date of birth: 17 August 1992 (age 34)
- Place of birth: Terra Nova do Norte, Brazil
- Height: 1.79 m (5 ft 10 in)
- Position: Left-back

Team information
- Current team: Juventude
- Number: 16

Youth career
- Vila Nova
- 2010–2011: Vasco da Gama

Senior career*
Years	Team	Apps	(Gls)
2010–2012	Vasco da Gama	5	(0)
2011–2012	→ Sport Recife (loan)	5	(0)
2013	Guarani	14	(0)
2013–2014	Coritiba	30	(0)
2014	→ Atlético Goianiense (loan)	11	(0)
2015	Goiás	27	(0)
2016	Botafogo	43	(2)
2017	Cruzeiro	43	(1)
2018–2020	Palmeiras	75	(0)
2020–2023	Grêmio	84	(1)
2023	→ Fluminense (loan)	19	(1)
2024	Fluminense	33	(0)
2025–2026	Fortaleza	26	(1)
2026–	Juventude	30	(0)
- * Club domestic league appearances and goals as of 17 November 2026

Diogo Barbosa Mendanha (17 August 1992), known as Diogo Barbosa, is a Brazilian footballer who plays for Juventude as a left-back.

== Club career ==
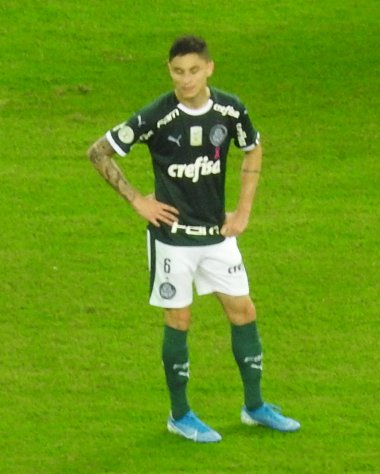
Diogo Barbosa playing for Palmeiras in 2019

Born in Terra Nova do Norte, Mato Grosso, Diogo joined Vasco da Gama in 2010, after impressing for Vila Nova's youth categories. He made his first team – and Série A – debut on 24 October 2010, starting in a 1–1 home draw against Flamengo.

On 13 September 2011, after being rarely used, Diogo was loaned to Sport until the end of the following year. In August 2012, however, he moved to ASA also in a temporary deal, but his loan was cut short just days later.

On 31 October 2012, Diogo agreed to a contract with Guarani, after having his federative rights assigned to Coimbra. The following 2 June, he moved to Coritiba.

On 14 July 2014, Diogo was loaned to Atlético Goianiense until the end of the year. On 8 January of the following year, he joined Goiás.

On 29 December 2015, Diogo agreed to a one-year deal with Botafogo. He scored his first goal in the first division on 16 July 2016, netting his team's first in a 3–3 home draw against Flamengo.

On 14 December 2016, after failing to agree new terms, Diogo signed a three-year contract with Cruzeiro.

On 14 November 2017, the sale of Diogo Barbosa to Palmeiras was settled for R$17.000.000.

On 11 September 2020, he was announced as a Grêmio player, signing a contract until 2023.

== Career statistics ==
As of 28 December 2023

Club	Season	League			State League		Cup		Continental		Other		Total	
Club	Season	Division	Apps	Goals	Apps	Goals	Apps	Goals	Apps	Goals	Apps	Goals	Apps	Goals
Vasco da Gama	2010	Série A	5	0	0	0	0	0	—		—		5	0
Vasco da Gama	2011	Série A	0	0	0	0	0	0	—		—		0	0
Vasco da Gama	Total		5	0	0	0	0	0	—		—		5	0
Sport Recife	2011	Série B	3	0	—		—		—		—		3	0
Sport Recife	2012	Série A	0	0	2	0	1	0	—		—		3	0
Sport Recife	Total		3	0	2	0	1	0	—		—		6	0
Guarani	2013	Série C	0	0	14	0	1	0	—		—		15	0
Coritiba	2013	Série A	24	0	—		—		1 (Note: Appearance(s) in Copa Sudamericana)	0	—		25	0
Coritiba	2014	Série A	0	0	6	0	0	0	—		—		6	0
Coritiba	Total		24	0	6	0	0	0	1	0	—		31	0
Atlético Goianiense	2014	Série B	11	0	—		—		—		—		11	0
Goiás	2015	Série A	26	0	1	0	0	0	1	0	—		28	0
Botafogo	2016	Série A	26	2	17	0	2	0	—		—		45	2
Cruzeiro	2017	Série A	31	1	12	0	13	1	2	0	1 (Note: Appearance(s) in Primeira Liga)	0	59	2
Palmeiras	2018	Série A	20	0	1	0	6	0	9 (Note: Appearance(s) in Copa Libertadores)	0	—		36	0
Palmeiras	2019	Série A	33	0	10	0	2	0	6	0	—		51	0
Palmeiras	2020	Série A	5	0	6	0	0	0	0	0	—		11	0
Palmeiras	Total		58	0	17	0	8	0	15	0	—		98	0
Grêmio	2020	Série A	21	0	—		7	0	4	0	—		32	0
Grêmio	2021	Série A	16	1	5	0	2	1	5 (Note: Two appearances in Copa Libertadores, three appearances in Copa Sudamericana)	0	—		28	2
Grêmio	2022	Série B	21	0	6	0	0	0	—		—		27	0
Grêmio	2023	Série A	6	0	9	0	4	0	—		—		19	0
Grêmio	Total		68	1	20	0	13	1	9	0	—		106	2
Fluminense	2023	Série A	19	1	—		—		5	0	2 (Note: Appearance(s) in FIFA Club World Cup)	0	26	1
Career total			271	5	89	0	38	2	33	0	3	0	430	7

== Honours ==
=== Club ===
Goiás

- Campeonato Goiano: 2015

Cruzeiro

- Copa do Brasil: 2017

Palmeiras

- Campeonato Brasileiro Série A: 2018
- Campeonato Paulista: 2020

Grêmio

- Campeonato Gaúcho: 2021, 2022, 2023
- Recopa Gaúcha: 2021, 2022, 2023

Fluminense

- Copa Libertadores: 2023
- Recopa Sudamericana: 2024

=== Individual ===
- Campeonato Carioca Team of the Year: 2016
- Best Left-back in Brazil: 2017
