= 2018 Campeonato Paulista =

Campeonato Paulista - Série A1
- Season: 2018
- Teams: 16
- Champions: Corinthians
- Relegated: Linense; Santo André
- Matches: 96
- Goals: 193 (2.01 per match)
- Top goalscorer: Miguel Borja (7 goals)

The 2018 Campeonato Paulista de Futebol Profissional da Primeira Divisão - Série A1 was the 117th season of São Paulo's top professional football league.

== Format ==
- In the first stage the sixteen teams are drawn, with seeding, into four groups of four teams each, with each team playing once against the twelve clubs from the other three groups. After each team has played twelve matches, the top two teams of each group qualify for the quarter-final stage.
- After the completion of the first stage, the two clubs with the lowest number of points, regardless of the group, will be relegated to the Campeonato Paulista Série A2.
- Quarter-finals, semi-finals and finals are played in a two-legged home and away fixture, with the best placed first stage team playing the second leg at home.
- In case of a draw in any knockout stage, the match will be decided by a penalty shoot-out.

=== Tiebreakers ===
The teams are ranked according to points (3 points for a win, 1 point for a draw, 0 points for a loss). If two or more teams are equal on points on completion of the group matches, the following criteria are applied to determine the rankings:

1. Higher number of wins;
2. Superior goal difference;
3. Higher number of goals scored;
4. Fewest red cards received;
5. Fewest yellow cards received;
6. Draw in the headquarters of the FPF.

== Teams ==
Club	Home city	Manager	2017 result
Botafogo-SP	Ribeirão Preto	Léo Condé	6th
Bragantino	Bragança Paulista	Marcelo Veiga	2nd (Série A2)
Corinthians	São Paulo (Tatuapé)	Fábio Carille	1st
Ferroviária	Araraquara	PC Oliveira	14th
Ituano	Itu	Vinícius Bergantin	10th
Linense	Lins	Márcio Fernandes	7th
Mirassol	Mirassol	Moisés Egert	9th
Novorizontino	Novo Horizonte	Doriva	8th
Palmeiras	São Paulo (Perdizes)	Roger Machado	3rd
Ponte Preta	Campinas	Eduardo Baptista	2nd
Red Bull Brasil	Campinas	Ricardo Catalá	13th
Santo André	Santo André	Sérgio Soares	11th
Santos	Santos	Jair Ventura	5th
São Bento	Sorocaba	Paulo Roberto Santos	12th
São Caetano	São Caetano do Sul	Pintado	1st (Série A2)
São Paulo	São Paulo (Morumbi)	Diego Aguirre	4th

Source: Futebol Paulista

== First stage ==
Key to colours in group tables
Group winners and runners-up advance to the quarter-finals
Two bottom teams (independent of group) are relegated

=== Group A ===
Pos	Team	Pld	W	D	L	GF	GA	GD	Pts	Qualification
1	Corinthians	12	7	2	3	17	8	+9	23	knockout stage
2	Bragantino	12	4	5	3	9	8	+1	17	knockout stage
3	Ituano	12	4	5	3	13	13	0	17	
4	Linense	12	2	4	6	13	20	−7	10	

Source: Soccerway

=== Group B ===
Pos	Team	Pld	W	D	L	GF	GA	GD	Pts	Qualification
1	São Paulo	12	5	2	5	12	11	+1	17	knockout stage
2	São Caetano	12	4	3	5	8	14	−6	15	knockout stage
3	Ponte Preta	12	2	6	4	6	8	−2	12	
4	Santo André	12	1	5	6	11	18	−7	8	

Source: Soccerway

=== Group C ===
Pos	Team	Pld	W	D	L	GF	GA	GD	Pts	Qualification
1	Palmeiras	12	8	2	2	19	8	+11	26	knockout stage
2	Novorizontino	12	6	2	4	18	17	+1	20	knockout stage
3	São Bento	12	4	5	3	11	8	+3	17	
4	Ferroviária	12	2	7	3	11	12	−1	13	

Source: Soccerway

=== Group D ===
Pos	Team	Pld	W	D	L	GF	GA	GD	Pts	Qualification
1	Santos	12	5	3	4	17	13	+4	18	knockout stage
2	Botafogo-SP	12	4	4	4	9	11	−2	16	knockout stage
3	Red Bull Brasil	12	2	7	3	10	11	−1	13	
4	Mirassol	12	2	6	4	9	13	−4	12	

Source: Soccerway

== Knockout stage ==
=== Bracket ===
Quarterfinals
C1	Palmeiras	3	5	8
C2	Novorizontino	0	0	0
D1	Santos	0	0	0 (3)
D2	Botafogo-SP	0	0	0 (1)
A1	Corinthians	2	2	4
A2	Bragantino	3	0	3
B1	São Paulo	0	2	2
B2	São Caetano	1	0	1

Semifinals
C1	Palmeiras	1	1	2 (5)
D1	Santos	0	2	2 (3)
A1	Corinthians	0	1	1 (5)
B1	São Paulo	1	0	1 (4)

Finals
C1	Palmeiras	1	0	1 (3)
A1	Corinthians	0	1	1 (4)

Campeonato Paulista
2018 Champion
Corinthians
29th Title

== General table ==
Pos	Team	Pld	W	D	L	GF	GA	GD	Pts	Qualification or relegation
1	Corinthians (C)	18	10	2	6	23	13	+10	32	Finals
2	Palmeiras	18	12	2	4	30	11	+19	38	Finals
3	São Paulo	16	7	2	7	15	13	+2	23	Eliminated in the semifinals
4	Santos	16	6	5	5	19	15	+4	23	Eliminated in the semifinals
5	Novorizontino (B)	14	6	2	6	18	25	−7	20	Eliminated in the quarterfinals
6	Bragantino	14	5	5	4	12	12	0	20	Eliminated in the quarterfinals
7	São Caetano (B)	14	5	3	6	9	16	−7	18	Eliminated in the quarterfinals
8	Botafogo-SP	14	4	6	4	9	11	−2	18	Eliminated in the quarterfinals
9	São Bento	12	4	5	3	11	8	+3	17	
10	Ituano (B)	12	4	5	3	13	13	0	17	
11	Ferroviária	12	2	7	3	11	12	−1	13	
12	Red Bull Brasil	12	2	7	3	10	11	−1	13	
13	Ponte Preta	12	2	6	4	6	8	−2	12	
14	Mirassol	12	2	6	4	9	13	−4	12	
15	Linense (R)	12	2	4	6	13	20	−7	10	Relegation to Paulista Série A2
16	Santo André (R)	12	1	5	6	11	18	−7	8	Relegation to Paulista Série A2

Updated to match(es) played on April 8, 2018. Source: Soccerway.com
Rules for classification: 1st stage 2nd points; 3rd wins; 4th goal difference; 5th goals scored; 6th head-to-head results; 7th least red cards received; 8th least yellow cards received; 9th draw.
(B) Qualification for the Campeonato Brasileiro Série D; (C) Champions; (R) Relegated

== Awards ==
=== Team of the year ===
Pos.	Player	Club
GK	(Brazil) Jailson	Palmeiras
DF	(Brazil) Marcos Rocha	Palmeiras
DF	(Paraguay) Fabián Balbuena	Corinthians
DF	(Brazil) Antônio Carlos	Palmeiras
DF	(Brazil) Victor Luis	Palmeiras
MF	(Brazil) Felipe Melo	Palmeiras
MF	(Brazil) Rodriguinho	Corinthians
MF	(Brazil) Lucas Lima	Palmeiras
FW	(Brazil) Dudu	Palmeiras
FW	(Colombia) Miguel Borja	Palmeiras
FW	(Brazil) Gabriel	Santos
MAN	(Brazil) Roger Machado	Palmeiras

Source
Last updated: 10 April 2018

Player of the Season

The Player of the Year was awarded to Jailson.

Young Player of the Season

The Young Player of the Year was awarded to Rodrygo.

Countryside Best Player of the Season

The Countryside Best Player of the Year was awarded to Bruno Moraes.

Top scorer of the Season

The top scorer of the season was Miguel Borja, who scored seven goals.

== Top scorers ==
As of 17 April 2019

Rank	Player	Club	Goals
1.	(Colombia) Miguel Borja	Palmeiras	7
2.	(Brazil) Bruno Moraes	Botafogo-SP	5
2.	(Brazil) Matheus Peixoto	Bragantino	5
3.	(Brazil) Dudu	Palmeiras	4
3.	(Brazil) Gabriel	Santos	4
3.	(Brazil) Juninho	Novorizontino	4
3.	(Brazil) Keno	Palmeiras	4
3.	(Brazil) Rodriguinho	Corinthians	4
3.	(Brazil) Safira	Novorizontino	4
3.	(Brazil) Willian	Palmeiras	4
3.	(Brazil) Wilson	Linense	4
