= Hyoran =

Brazilian footballer (born 1993)

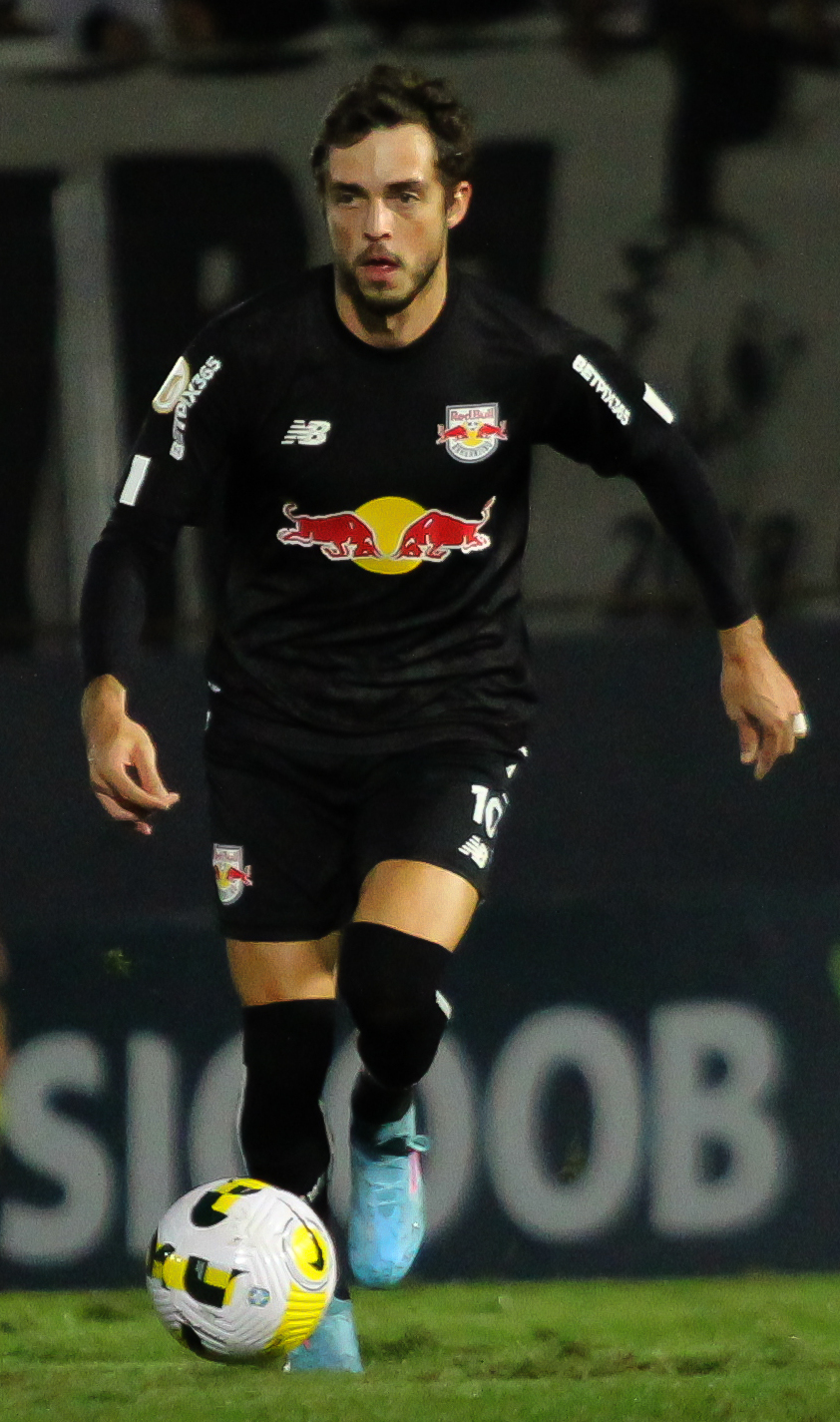
- Hyoran with Red Bull Bragantino in 2022

Personal information
- Full name: Hyoran Kauê Dalmoro
- Date of birth: 25 May 1993 (age 33)
- Place of birth: Chapecó, Brazil
- Height: 1.75 m (5 ft 9 in)
- Position: Attacking midfielder

Team information
- Current team: São Bernardo
- Number: 42

Youth career
- 2007: Paraná
- 2007: Coritiba
- 2008–2012: Corinthians
- 2012–2013: Chapecoense

Senior career*
Years	Team	Apps	(Gls)
2011–2012	Corinthians	0	(0)
2011	→ Flamengo-SP (loan)	7	(0)
2013–2016	Chapecoense	69	(5)
2017–2021	Palmeiras	42	(5)
2020–2021	→ Atlético Mineiro (loan)	42	(8)
2021–2023	Atlético Mineiro	51	(6)
2022	→ Red Bull Bragantino (loan)	38	(6)
2024–2026	Internacional	20	(1)
2025	→ Sport Recife (loan)	20	(0)
2026–	São Bernardo	21	(1)
- * Club domestic league appearances and goals as of 18 November 2026

Hyoran Kauê Dalmoro (born 25 May 1993), known simply as Hyoran, is a Brazilian footballer who plays as an attacking midfielder for São Bernardo.

== Club career ==
=== Early career ===
Born in Chapecó, Santa Catarina, Hyoran appeared for Paraná, Coritiba and Corinthians' youth setup before making his senior debuts while on loan at Flamengo de Guarulhos. He returned to Corinthians in January 2012, being subsequently released.

=== Chapecoense ===
Hyoran signed for Chapecoense shortly after, being initially assigned to the under-20s. He was promoted to the main squad in 2013, but was never used during the campaign, as his side was promoted to Série A for the first time ever.

Hyoran made his first team – and top level – debut on 6 September 2014, coming on as a late substitute for Camilo in a 0–0 home draw against Goiás. He was made a starter in 2015 by manager Vinícius Eutrópio, also scoring a brace in a 5–2 away win against Interporto for the season's Copa do Brasil.

On 28 November 2016, Hyoran did not board LaMia Airlines Flight 2933 for the 2016 Copa Sudamericana Finals, which crashed and killed 19 of his teammates, due to an injury.

=== Palmeiras ===
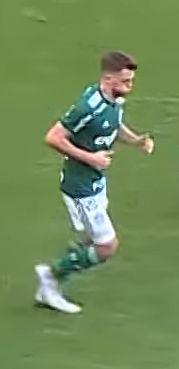
Hyoran with Palmeiras in 2018

On 9 November 2016, Hyoran agreed to a pre-contract with fellow top tier club Palmeiras, effective the following January.

=== Atlético Mineiro ===
On 8 January 2020, Hyoran joined Atlético Mineiro on a season-long loan. On 23 February 2021, he signed for the club on a permanent basis and a three-year deal, for a €1.15 million fee.

==== Loan to Red Bull Bragantino ====
On 13 January 2022, Atlético announced an agreement for the season-long loan of Hyoran to Red Bull Bragantino.

== Career statistics ==
As of 1 January 2024

Club	Season	League			State League		Cup		Continental		Other		Total	
Club	Season	Division	Apps	Goals	Apps	Goals	Apps	Goals	Apps	Goals	Apps	Goals	Apps	Goals
Flamengo-SP	2011	Paulista A3	—		7	0	—		—		—		7	0
Chapecoense	2013	Série B	0	0	0	0	—		—		—		0	0
Chapecoense	2014	Série A	4	0	0	0	0	0	—		—		4	0
Chapecoense	2015	Série A	17	0	18	1	3	3	0	0	—		38	4
Chapecoense	2016	Série A	20	2	10	2	4	0	2 (Note: Appearance(s) in Copa Sudamericana)	0	—		36	4
Chapecoense	Subtotal		41	2	28	3	7	3	2	0	—		78	8
Palmeiras	2017	Série A	5	1	1	0	0	0	0	0	—		6	1
Palmeiras	2018	Série A	24	3	0	0	2	0	5 (Note: Appearance(s) in Copa Libertadores)	1	—		31	4
Palmeiras	2019	Série A	12	1	0	0	1	0	6	1	—		19	2
Palmeiras	Subtotal		41	5	1	0	3	0	11	2	—		56	7
Atlético Mineiro	2020	Série A	29	8	14	0	2	0	2	1	—		47	9
Atlético Mineiro	2021	Série A	18	1	9	1	3	1	3	0	—		33	3
Atlético Mineiro	2023	Série A	12	2	11	2	3	0	9	0	—		35	4
Atlético Mineiro	Subtotal		59	11	34	3	8	1	14	1	—		115	16
Red Bull Bragantino	2022	Série A	26	3	12	3	1	0	4	0	—		43	6
Career total			167	21	82	9	19	4	31	3	0	0	299	37

== Honours ==
Chapecoense

- Campeonato Catarinense: 2016
- Copa Sudamericana: 2016

Palmeiras

- Campeonato Brasileiro Série A: 2018

Atlético Mineiro

- Campeonato Brasileiro Série A: 2021
- Copa do Brasil: 2021
- Campeonato Mineiro: 2020, 2021, 2023
