= Felipe Melo =

Brazilian footballer (born 1983)

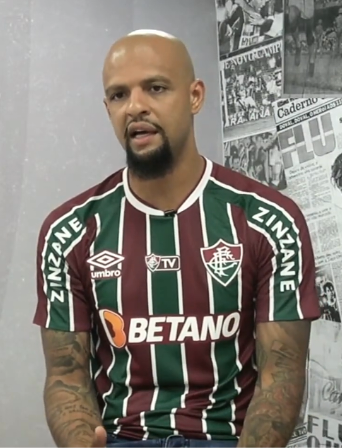
- Felipe Melo with Fluminense in 2022

Personal information
- Full name: Felipe Melo de Carvalho
- Date of birth: 26 June 1983 (age 43)
- Place of birth: Barra Mansa, Brazil
- Height: 1.85 m (6 ft 1 in)
- Positions: Defensive midfielder; centre-back

Senior career*
Years	Team	Apps	(Gls)
2001–2003	Flamengo	26	(3)
2003–2004	Cruzeiro	31	(2)
2004	Grêmio	19	(3)
2005	Mallorca	7	(0)
2005–2007	Racing Santander	48	(6)
2007–2008	Almería	33	(7)
2008–2009	Fiorentina	29	(2)
2009–2013	Juventus	58	(4)
2011–2013	→ Galatasaray (loan)	63	(13)
2013–2015	Galatasaray	52	(2)
2015–2017	Inter Milan	31	(1)
2017–2021	Palmeiras	160	(10)
2022–2024	Fluminense	74	(2)
Total		631	(55)

International career
2009–2010	Brazil	22	(2)
Medal record
Men's Football
Representing Brazil
FIFA Confederations Cup
Winner	2009 South Africa
U-20 South American Championship
Runner-up	2003 Uruguay
- * Club domestic league appearances and goals

Felipe Melo de Carvalho (born 26 June 1983), known as Felipe Melo, is a Brazilian former professional footballer who played as a defensive midfielder or centre-back.

He began his career with Brazilian teams Flamengo, Cruzeiro and Grêmio, before moving to Spain in 2005, where he represented Mallorca, Racing Santander and Almería in La Liga. After one year at Fiorentina, he signed for Juventus for €25 million in 2009. Felipe Melo spent four seasons at Galatasaray, playing 154 total games and winning eight honours, including three Süper Lig titles. After a spell back in Serie A with Inter Milan, he returned to Brazil in 2017 by signing for Palmeiras. He won the Campeonato Brasileiro Série A in 2018 and the Copa Libertadores in 2020 and 2021 with Palmeiras, before joining Fluminense where he won the latter again in 2023, before retiring in 2025.

Felipe Melo was a Brazilian international from 2009 to 2010, earning 22 caps and scoring two goals. He was part of their squads that won the 2009 FIFA Confederations Cup and reached the quarter-finals of the 2010 FIFA World Cup.

== Club career ==
=== Brazil ===
Felipe Melo began his career for Flamengo, where he made 69 appearances and scored no goals in his two-season spell with the club. Following impressive performances with Flamengo, Melo transferred to Cruzeiro in the summer of 2003, but would remain for just one season. In his single season with Cruzeiro, Melo managed to make 31 league appearances, scoring two goals. Following yet another impressive season in Brazil, he was sold to Grêmio.

Following his transfer to Grêmio, Melo managed to make an additional 19 appearances and adding three goals to his tally in his native Brazil. He would only remain in Porto Alegre for 2004, because Grêmio was relegated that year and the team was dismantled.

=== Spain ===
In January 2005, Felipe Melo moved abroad for the first time, joining Spanish La Liga club Mallorca, who released Andrija Delibašić to give him a place. He played only eight times for the Balearic team, his season ending through knee ligament injury against Valencia in March; they narrowly avoided relegation.

Ahead of the 2005–06 season, Melo moved to fellow league team Racing de Santander. He scored his first goal for them on 21 December, in a 2–1 win away to Real Madrid at the Santiago Bernabéu.

On 3 July 2007, Felipe Melo became Almería's first signing ahead of their debut top-flight season. The transfer, which involved buying some of his rights from a third-party owner, was the most expensive in the club's history. He was a regular in midfield for Unai Emery's team, contributing seven goals as the Andalusians finished 8th.

=== Fiorentina ===
After a successful first season at Almería, Felipe Melo agreed to transfer to Italian side Fiorentina in a reported €13 million transfer for the 2008–09 season. Having held Spanish nationality since the 2007–08 season, he was not counted as a non-EU player in the Italian Serie A.

He made his debut in the first leg of the third qualifying round of the UEFA Champions League against Slavia Prague, and scored his first goal in a Viola shirt against Atalanta in the Serie A. After a very impressive debut season in the Serie A, which included 29 appearances and two goals, the Brazilian transferred to Juventus in Turin.

=== Juventus ===
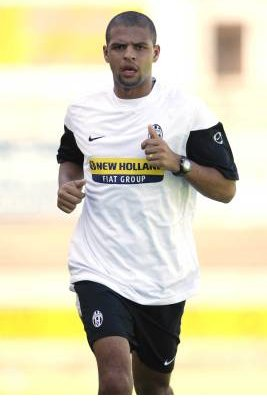
Felipe Melo training with Juventus in 2009

On 30 June 2009, following a lauded performance with Brazil at the 2009 FIFA Confederations Cup, Felipe Melo signed a new five-year contract with Fiorentina, with a release clause of €25 million. At this point, Arsenal was reportedly in negotiations to sign the player. Within days, however, Melo was the subject of a bid from Juventus. The two rival clubs eventually agreed a fee of €25 million in total and Juve's Marco Marchionni joined Fiorentina on 15 July 2009 for a tagged price of €4.5 million. Later, Cristiano Zanetti, tagged for €2 million, re-joined Fiorentina. This allowed Juve to pay Fiorentina €18.5 million in three instalments.

The first half of the 2009–10 season was one to forget despite a bright start to his Juve career. He scored his first Juve goal against top-of-the-table rivals Roma in a 3–1 win. In the December Derby d'Italia fixture at home, he was controversially sent off for a supposed elbow at Inter Milan's Mario Balotelli. The incident sparked a fiery argument between his teammate Gianluigi Buffon and Inter midfielder Thiago Motta, and both had to be separated by Inter and Juve players. Due to his poor performances throughout the season, he won the Bidone d'Oro Award in 2009, which was given to the worst Serie A player during a particular season. Melo was instrumental in his side's win over A.C. Milan at the San Siro in the 2010–11 season, and was later voted man of the match.

=== Galatasaray ===
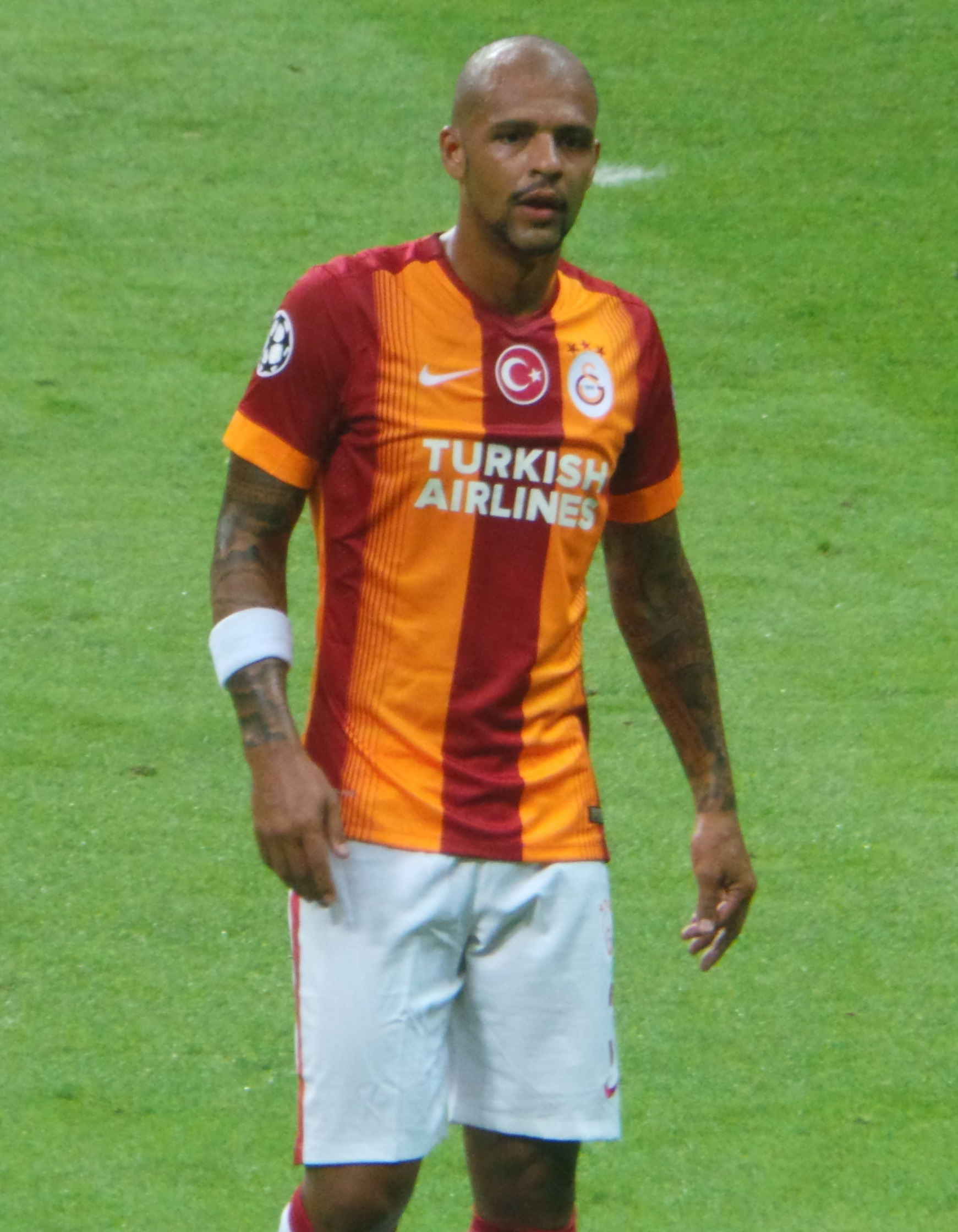
Felipe Melo playing for Galatasaray in 2014

On 22 July 2011, Felipe Melo joined Galatasaray in Turkey on a season-long loan deal for €1.5 million, with an option to transfer permanently at the end of the season for €13 million. He agreed on a contract with a net annual salary of €3.3 million plus a per-appearance bonus of €30,000, replacing departed Lorik Cana as the club's new central midfielder. He was attributed to the nickname "Pitbull" by the team supporters because of his passionate playing style, which also helped him become a fans favourite quickly; it is said that he displayed the mutual respect back with his tattoo of the club's mascot, a lion, on his arm. This is not true, however, because in his own statement, he states that this is a coincidence and that he got the tattoo due to the fact that in Brazil, a lion is a symbol for Jesus Christ.

Felipe Melo scored his first goal on 18 September 2011 from a 35-metre-long shot against Samsunspor. He scored 12 goals in 36 league matches, and at the end of the season, he was among the champion squad.

Felipe Melo had been expected to make a permanent move to Galatasaray, but on 24 July, transfer fee negotiations between the club and Juventus broke down due to the Turkish club requesting a lower fee for the player. On 14 August, the two clubs were able to agree another loan deal sending Melo to Turkey for the 2012–13 season, for €1.75 million, with the agreement including "the option, to be exercised by Galatasaray by 30 April 2013, for the permanent acquisition of the player for a price of €6.5 million". Melo also had a wage cut to €2.9 million with an appearances-based bonus of €25,000.

On 24 November, in a game between Galatasaray and Elazığspor in the Süper Lig, Felipe Melo went in goal and saved a penalty, after regular keeper Fernando Muslera had committed a foul and been sent off after Galatasaray had already used all their substitutions.

On 20 July 2013, Felipe Melo made a permanent move to Galatasaray on a three-year contract worth €3.1 million plus bonuses, while the transfer fee was reduced to €3.75 million plus bonuses of a maximum €500,000, which the club activated. He made his 100th appearance for the club on 2 February 2014 in Süper Lig encounter against Bursaspor in a 6–0 home win.

On 13 August 2015, Melo signed a four-year contract extension; during the first season of said contract, the yearly salary remained unchanged at €3.1 million, but was set to be reduced to €2.6 million for next three seasons. As of 2015, he is the most decorated Brazilian player in Turkish domestic competitions, winning seven cups, beating the record of his fellow countryman and ex-Galatasaray goalkeeper Cláudio Taffarel.

=== Inter Milan ===
On 31 August 2015, Felipe Melo returned to Italy to sign with Inter Milan on a two-year contract and a €3.7 million transfer fee, plus €500,000 bonuses for each UEFA Champions League group stage qualification of the club, up to the 2017–18 season. Melo also received €657,500 from Galatasaray. He officially returned to Serie A play on 23 September 2015 against Hellas Verona, against which he also scored his first goal for Inter.

=== Palmeiras ===
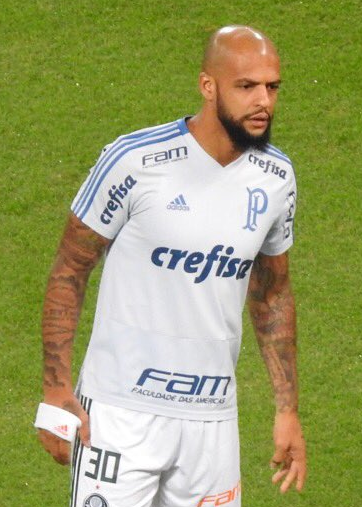
Felipe Melo in action for Palmeiras in 2018

On 8 January 2017, Palmeiras announced the signing of Felipe Melo on a three-year contract. Four days later Inter Milan announced that it was a loan until 30 June, with Melo's contract with Inter set to expire on the same day. He made his debut on 5 February in a 1–0 home win over Botafogo-SP on the first day of the Campeonato Paulista season; during the game he screamed in the ear of opponent Samuel Santos, which he admitted was done to liven up the fans. On 22 March, he scored his first goal for the team to conclude a 2–0 win over Mirassol also at Allianz Parque. In July, he was frozen out of the team for criticising manager Cuca; he returned in September.

In the 2018 season, Palmeiras came second in the state and first in the national league, under the management of Luiz Felipe Scolari. Felipe Melo said that he improved as a player and a professional under the new manager, and contributed two goals, one being in a 3–0 win over Fluminense in the final stretch of the season.

Felipe Melo signed a new contract in June 2019, for two more years at Palmeiras. He scored three times in that year's national competition, including in derbies against Corinthians (1–1 away draw) and São Paulo (3–0 home win).

In the 2020 season, Felipe Melo was part of a Palmeiras team that won the state championship and the Copa do Brasil, as well as the Copa Libertadores. His team retained the continental tournament a year later with an extra-time final win over Flamengo in Montevideo.

=== Fluminense ===
On 13 December 2021, 38-year-old Felipe Melo returned to his home state's football 18 years after leaving Flamengo, signing for Fluminense. He chose the squad number 70 in allusion to the team's win in the 1952 Copa Rio 70 years earlier. His team won the 2022 Campeonato Carioca against Flamengo.

In 2023, Fluminense retained the state title against the same rival, and in September that year Felipe Melo's contract was extended to the end of 2024. He also won his third career Libertadores title, against Boca Juniors.

=== Retirement ===
On 24 January 2025, Felipe Melo announced his retirement from football at the age of 41.

== International career ==
Felipe Melo made his senior international debut for Brazil on 10 February 2009 against Italy in a friendly, a match Brazil won 2–0. On 1 April 2009, he scored his first goal for his country against Peru in a 3–0 World Cup qualification victory.

Felipe Melo was named to the Brazilian squad for the 2009 FIFA Confederations Cup in South Africa, playing in every match of the tournament for his side and scoring the opener in a 3–0 group stage win against the United States. Brazil would again beat the U.S. in the final to win a third consecutive Confederations Cup title.

Felipe Melo was named in Brazil's final 23-man squad for the 2010 FIFA World Cup. In Brazil's quarter-final against the Netherlands in Port Elizabeth, he provided the assist for Robinho's tenth-minute opener, before Melo himself slightly touched a Wesley Sneijder cross, which at first was recorded as an own goal, but later credited to Sneijder. Sneijder then put the Dutch 2–1 ahead, before Melo was then sent off by referee Yuichi Nishimura in the 73rd minute for a violent stamp on Dutch winger Arjen Robben. On Brazil's return home after the World Cup, Felipe Melo took the brunt of the criticism of the fans as they threw insults, pushed and shoved towards the players.

== Style of play ==
A quick, strong, tenacious, yet talented midfielder, Felipe Melo is known in particular for his hard-working, energetic, physical, and hard-tackling playing style, which has earned him the nicknames Pitbull and Gladiator, while in 2015 his Inter manager at the time, Roberto Mancini, described Melo and his teammate Gary Medel as warriors. He is able to play as a central or box-to-box midfielder, but is usually deployed as a defensive midfielder, where his stamina, power, tactical intelligence, and ball-winning abilities aid him in breaking down opposing plays, while his good all-round skills, first touch, and passing allow him subsequently to distribute the ball to his more offensive-minded teammates. In addition to his defensive attributes, he is also known for his dynamism and ability to make late runs into the area from midfield, which occasionally enables him to provide an additional attacking outlet to his teams. Throughout his career, Melo has stood out for his leadership on the pitch, although he has also equally been criticised for his aggression and tendency to pick up cards.

== Personal life ==
Felipe Melo is married to Roberta, and they have one daughter (Pietra) and three sons, Davi, Linyker (who he named after the English centre forward Gary Lineker), and Bernardo.

On 18 June 2013, through Twitter and Facebook, Felipe Melo offended Renato Maurício Prado, a pundit of the Fox Sports channel. Among another names callings, Melo called Prado "coward", "arsehole" and "the most famous cuckold of sporting journalism". Prado sued Melo in August.

On 4 June 2014, Felipe Melo was on vacation with his family and friend in Las Vegas. Whilst enjoying dinner with his family and friends, a former football player and his friend handed Melo a hand-written paper stating "Sampiyon Fenerbahçe – which means Champion Fenerbahçe". Fenerbahçe, the main opponent of Galatasaray, had finished as Turkish Süper Lig champions for the 2013–14 season, which had just concluded. Melo responded to the note by showing the two his middle finger and by kicking one of them. The case was taken to American police.

Felipe Melo endorsed Jair Bolsonaro in the 2018 Brazilian presidential election. He dedicated his winning goal against Chapecoense in October 2019 to the president, a fan of Palmeiras.

== Career statistics ==
=== Club ===
As of match played 21 September 2024

Appearances and goals by club, season and competition
Club	Season	League			State league (Note: Includes Campeonato Mineiro, Campeonato Gaúcho, Campeonato Paulista)		National cup (Note: Includes Copa del Rey, Copa do Brasil, Coppa Italia, Turkish Cup)		Continental		Other		Total	
Club	Season	Division	Apps	Goals	Apps	Goals	Apps	Goals	Apps	Goals	Apps	Goals	Apps	Goals
Flamengo	2001	Série A	3	1	0	0	0	0	—		—		3	1
Flamengo	2002	Série A	21	2	0	0	0	0	6 (Note: Appearances in Copa Libertadores)	2	—		27	4
Flamengo	2003	Série A	2	0	0	0	0	0	—		—		2	0
Flamengo	Total		26	3	0	0	0	0	6	2	—		32	5
Cruzeiro	2003	Série A	31	2	0	0	0	0	2 (Note: Appearances in Copa Sudamericana)	0	—		33	2
Cruzeiro	2004	Série A	0	0	0	0	0	0	3	1	—		3	1
Cruzeiro	Total		31	2	0	0	0	0	5	1	—		36	3
Grêmio	2004	Série A	19	3	0	0	0	0	2	0	—		21	3
Mallorca	2004–05	La Liga	7	0	—		0	0	—		—		7	0
Racing Santander	2005–06	La Liga	33	3	—		1	0	—		—		34	3
Racing Santander	2006–07	La Liga	15	3	—		0	0	—		—		15	3
Racing Santander	Total		48	6	—		1	0	—		—		49	6
Almería	2007–08	La Liga	33	7	—		1	0	—		—		34	7
Fiorentina	2008–09	Serie A	29	2	—		1	0	10 (Note: Eight appearances in UEFA Champions League, two appearances in UEFA Cup)	0	—		40	2
Juventus	2009–10	Serie A	29	3	—		2	0	9 (Note: Six appearances in UEFA Champions League, three appearances in UEFA Europa League)	0	—		40	3
Juventus	2010–11	Serie A	29	1	—		2	0	7 (Note: Appearances in UEFA Europa League)	0	—		38	1
Juventus	Total		58	4	—		4	0	16	0	—		78	4
Galatasaray	2011–12	Süper Lig	36	12	—		0	0	—		—		36	12
Galatasaray	2012–13	Süper Lig	26	1	—		0	0	9 (Note: Appearances in UEFA Champions League)	0	—		35	1
Galatasaray	2013–14	Süper Lig	30	1	—		8	1	8	1	1 (Note: Appearance in Turkish Super Cup)	0	47	3
Galatasaray	2014–15	Süper Lig	20	1	—		7	1	6	0	1	0	34	2
Galatasaray	2015–16	Süper Lig	2	0	—		0	0	0	0	—		2	0
Galatasaray	Total		114	15	—		15	2	23	1	2	0	154	18
Inter Milan	2015–16	Serie A	26	1	—		2	0	—		—		28	1
Inter Milan	2016–17	Serie A	5	0	—		0	0	5	0	—		10	0
Inter Milan	Total		31	1	—		2	0	5	0	—		38	1
Palmeiras	2017	Série A	10	0	13	2	3	0	4	0	—		30	2
Palmeiras	2018	Série A	29	2	13	0	5	1	8	0	—		55	3
Palmeiras	2019	Série A	24	3	11	1	4	0	9	2	—		48	6
Palmeiras	2020	Série A	15	0	13	1	4	0	6	0	0	0	38	1
Palmeiras	2021	Série A	24	1	8	0	1	0	8	0	5 (Note: Two appearances in FIFA Club World Cup, two appearances in Recopa Sudamericana, one appearance in Supercopa do Brasil)	0	46	1
Palmeiras	Total		102	6	58	4	17	1	35	2	5	0	217	13
Fluminense	2022	Série A	24	0	6	0	4	0	4	0	—		38	0
Fluminense	2023	Série A	19	2	11	0	3	1	12	0	2 (Note: Appearances in FIFA Club World Cup)	0	47	3
Fluminense	2024	Série A	10	0	4	0	1	0	6	0	2 (Note: Appearance(s) in Recopa Sudamericana)	0	23	0
Fluminense	Total		53	2	21	0	8	1	22	0	4	0	108	3
Career total			551	51	79	4	49	4	124	6	11	0	814	67

=== International ===
Appearances and goals by national team and year
National team	Year	Apps	Goals
Brazil	2009	15	2
Brazil	2010	7	0
Total		22	2

Scores and results list Brazil's goal tally first, score column indicates score after each Felipe Melo goal.

List of international goals scored by Felipe Melo
No.	Date	Venue	Opponent	Score	Result	Competition
1	1 April 2009	Estádio Beira-Rio, Porto Alegre, Brazil	Peru	3–0	3–0	2010 FIFA World Cup qualification
2	18 June 2009	Loftus Versfeld Stadium, Pretoria, South Africa	United States	1–0	3–0	2009 FIFA Confederations Cup

== Honours ==
Flamengo

- Campeonato Carioca: 2001
- Copa dos Campeões: 2001

Cruzeiro

- Série A: 2003

Galatasaray

- Süper Lig: 2011–12, 2012–13, 2014–15
- Turkish Cup: 2013–14, 2014–15
- Turkish Super Cup: 2012, 2013, 2015

Palmeiras

- Copa Libertadores: 2020, 2021
- Série A: 2018
- Copa do Brasil: 2020
- Campeonato Paulista: 2020

Fluminense

- Copa Libertadores: 2023
- Recopa Sudamericana: 2024
- Campeonato Carioca: 2022, 2023

Brazil

- FIFA Confederations Cup: 2009

Individual

- Campeonato Paulista Team of the Year: 2017, 2018
- Best Defensive Midfielder in Brazil: 2018
