= Alex Reinaldo =

Brazilian footballer (born 1991)

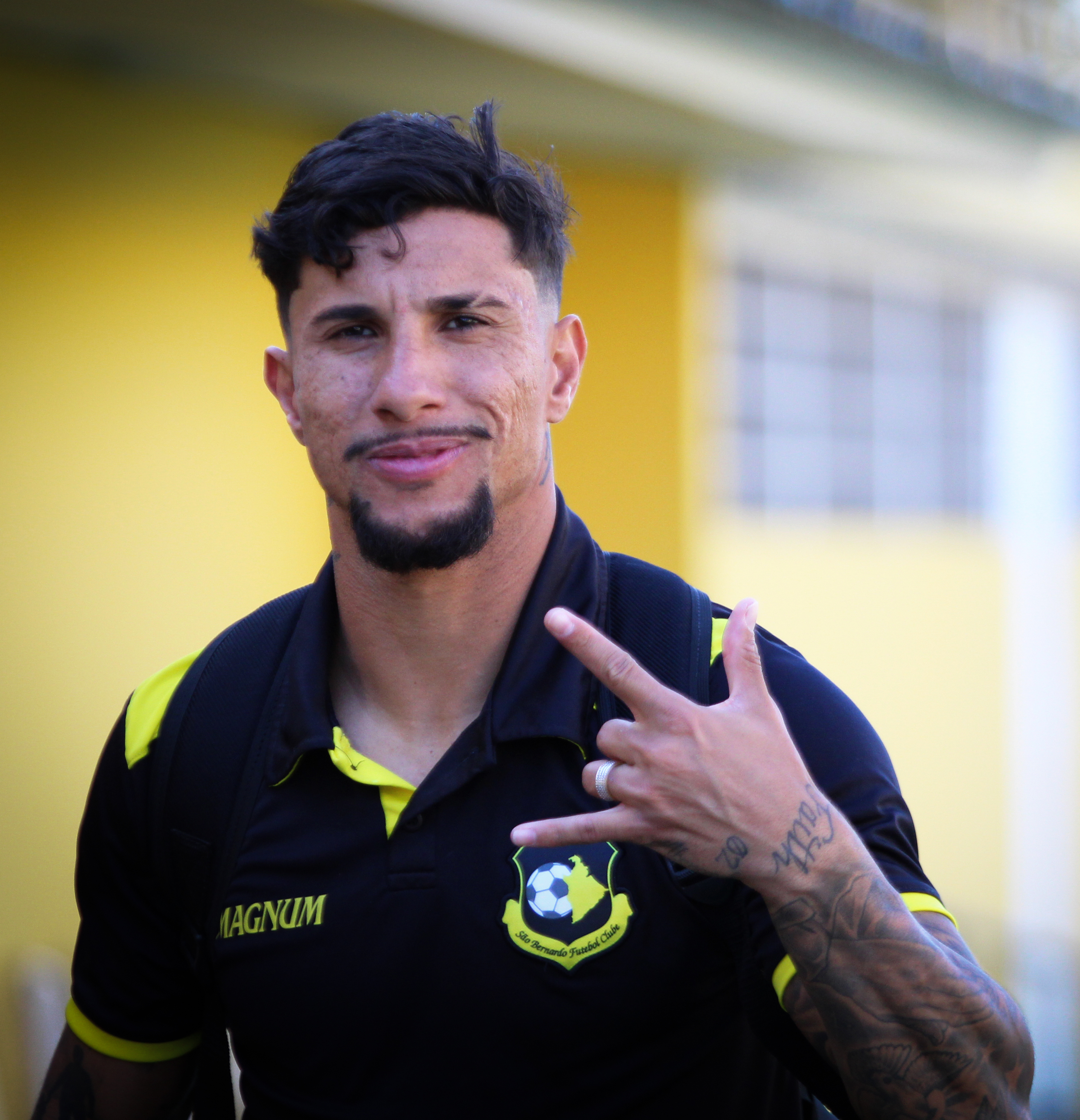
- Alex Reinaldo with São Bernardo in 2022

Personal information
- Full name: Alex Reinaldo da Silva Vieira
- Date of birth: 8 March 1991 (age 35)
- Place of birth: Jacobina, Brazil
- Height: 1.70 m (5 ft 7 in)
- Position: Right-back

Team information
- Current team: Retrô
- Number: 15

Senior career*
Years	Team	Apps	(Gls)
2009–2012	União Barbarense	48	(4)
2012	Bragantino	2	(0)
2013	União Barbarense	17	(4)
2013–2014	Avaí	8	(0)
2014	→ Atlético Sorocaba (loan)	3	(0)
2015	São Bento	14	(2)
2015	Red Bull Brasil	5	(0)
2016	Mogi Mirim	10	(0)
2016	Mirassol	16	(2)
2017–2020	São Caetano	101	(9)
2020	Criciúma	5	(0)
2021–2022	Água Santa	3	(0)
2022–2023	São Bernardo	44	(5)
2024	Oeste	9	(2)
2024–	Retrô	9	(1)
- * Club domestic league appearances and goals as of 24 January 2022

Alex Reinaldo da Silva Vieira (born 8 March 1991), known as Alex Reinaldo, is a Brazilian professional footballer who plays as a right-back for Retrô.

== Career statistics ==
As of 24 January 2022

Club	Season	League			State League		Cup		Continental		Other		Total	
Club	Season	Division	Apps	Goals	Apps	Goals	Apps	Goals	Apps	Goals	Apps	Goals	Apps	Goals
União Barbarense	2011	Paulista A2	—		11	2	—		—		—		11	2
União Barbarense	2012	Paulista A2	—		24	2	—		—		—		24	2
União Barbarense	Subtotal		—		35	4	—		—		—		35	4
Bragantino	2012	Série B	2	0	—		—		—		—		2	0
União Barbarense	2013	Paulista	—		17	4	—		—		—		17	4
Avaí	2013	Série B	8	0	—		—		—		—		8	0
Atlético Sorocaba	2014	Paulista	—		3	0	—		—		—		3	0
São Bento	2015	Paulista	—		14	2	—		—		—		14	2
Red Bull Brasil	2015	Série D	5	0	—		—		—		—		5	0
Mogi Mirim	2016	Paulista	—		10	0	—		—		—		10	0
Mirassol	2016	Paulista A2	—		—		—		—		16 (Note: All appearance(s) in Copa Paulista)	2	16	2
São Caetano	2017	Paulista A2	—		20	0	—		—		21	1	41	1
São Caetano	2018	Paulista	—		10	0	0	0	—		—		10	0
São Caetano	2019	Série D	4	0	10	2	—		—		17	3	31	5
São Caetano	2020	Paulista	—		19	3	—		—		—		19	3
São Caetano	Subtotal		4	0	59	5	0	0	—		38	4	101	9
Criciúma	2020	Série C	5	0	—		—		—		—		5	0
Água Santa	2021	Paulista	—		2	0	—		—		—		2	0
Career total			24	0	140	15	0	0	0	0	54	6	218	21

== Honours ==
=== Club ===
Retrô

- Campeonato Brasileiro Série D: 2024
