= Francisco Duclós =

Peruvian soccer player (born 1996)

Personal information
- Full name: Francisco Elías Duclós Flores
- Date of birth: 29 January 1996 (age 30)
- Place of birth: Lima, Peru
- Height: 1.83 m (6 ft 0 in)
- Position: Defender

Team information
- Current team: Alianza Atlético
- Number: 55

Youth career
- Alianza Lima

Senior career*
Years	Team	Apps	(Gls)
-2016	Celta de Vigo B→(loan)	2	(0)
2016-	Alianza Lima	107	(1)
- * Club domestic league appearances and goals

Francisco Elías Duclós Flores (born 29 January 1996) is a Peruvian footballer.

== Career statistics ==
=== Club ===
As of match played 28 October 2023

Club	Season	League		National cup		Continental		Total	
Club	Season	Apps	Goals	Apps	Goals	Apps	Goals	Apps	Goals
Celta de Vigo B	2014-15	3	0	0	0	—		3	0
Alianza Lima	2016	21	1	0	0	—		21	1
Alianza Lima	2017	22	0	5	0	—		27	0
Alianza Lima	2018	31	0	0	0	4	0	35	0
Alianza Lima	2019	9	0	1	0	2	0	12	0
Alianza Lima	2020	9	0	—		0	0	9	0
Alianza Lima	Total	92	1	6	0	6	0	104	1
Sport Huancayo	2021	5	0	—		1	0	6	0
Ayacucho F.C.	2022	20	0	—		5	1	25	1
Academia Cantolao	2023	26	1	0	0	—		26	1
Career total		146	2	6	0	12	1	164	3
