= Adalberto (footballer, born 1987) =

Brazilian footballer

Personal information
- Full name: Adalberto Hilário Ferreira Neto
- Date of birth: 21 July 1987 (age 39)
- Place of birth: Juiz de Fora, Brazil
- Height: 1.82 m (6 ft 0 in)
- Position: Centre-back

Youth career
- 2003–2006: Atlético Mineiro
- 2006: Feyenoord

Senior career*
Years	Team	Apps	(Gls)
2007	América-MG		
2007	Westerlo	4	(0)
2007–2008	Ipatinga		
2009–2010	Kallo		
2010	Tupi		
2010	RFC Liège	15	(3)
2011	Tombense		
2011–2012	Tupi	7	(0)
2012	Americano	14	(2)
2013	Guarani-MG	10	(4)
2013–2014	Ipatinga	19	(2)
2014	América FC	18	(5)
2014	América	18	(2)
2014–2015	Linense	14	(0)
2015–2016	Criciúma	17	(1)
2016	Linense	0	(0)
2016–2017	CRB	48	(10)
2018	Linense	0	(0)
2018	Botafogo PB	0	(0)
2019	Goytacaz	0	(0)
2019	América RN	0	(0)
2019	Tupi	5	(0)
2019	Ipatinga	0	(0)
2020	São Bento	0	(0)
- * Club domestic league appearances and goals as of 22:21, 6 November 2019 (UTC)

Adalberto Hilário Ferreira Neto or simply Adalberto (born 21 July 1987) is a Brazilian professional footballer who plays as a centre-back.

== Career ==
In March 2007, Adalberto transferred from América-MG to Westerlo, where he played four league matches in the Belgian First Division before returning to Brazil. He contract was terminated in June 2008. He played the 2009/2010 for Kallo and was in April 2010 sold to Tupi Football Club. The central defender left after three months his club Tupi and returned to Belgium who signed with RFC Liège.
