= Jailson (footballer, born July 1981) =

Brazilian footballer

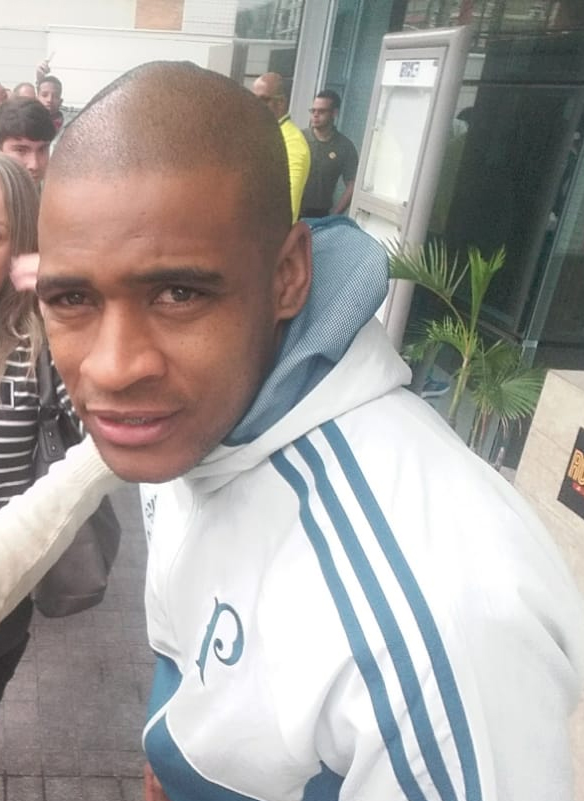
- Jailson with Palmeiras in 2017

Personal information
- Full name: Jailson Marcelino dos Santos
- Date of birth: July 20, 1981 (age 45)
- Place of birth: São José dos Campos, Brazil
- Height: 1.86 m (6 ft 1 in)
- Position: Goalkeeper

Youth career
- Joseense

Senior career*
Years	Team	Apps	(Gls)
2003	Campinense		
2004–2005	Joseense		
2005–2006	Ituano		
2007	Campinense		
2007–2009	Guaratinguetá	30	(0)
2009	Juventude	6	(0)
2010–2012	Guaratinguetá	125	(0)
2012–2013	Oeste	21	(0)
2013–2014	Ceará	21	(0)
2014–2021	Palmeiras	81	(0)
2022	Cruzeiro	0	(0)
2022	América Mineiro	14	(0)
- * Club domestic league appearances and goals as of 13:59, 6 July 2022 (UTC)

Jailson Marcelino dos Santos (born 20 July 1981), simply known as Jailson, is a retired Brazilian footballer who played as a goalkeeper.

== Honours ==
=== Club ===
Palmeiras

- Copa do Brasil: 2015, 2020
- Campeonato Brasileiro Série A: 2016, 2018
- Campeonato Paulista: 2020
- Copa Libertadores: 2020, 2021
- Recopa Sudamericana runner-up: 2021

=== Individual ===
- Bola de Prata: 2016
- Campeonato Brasileiro Série A Team of the Year: 2016
- Campeonato Paulista Best player: 2018
- Campeonato Paulista Team of the year: 2018
