= Rodriguinho (footballer, born 1988) =

Brazilian footballer

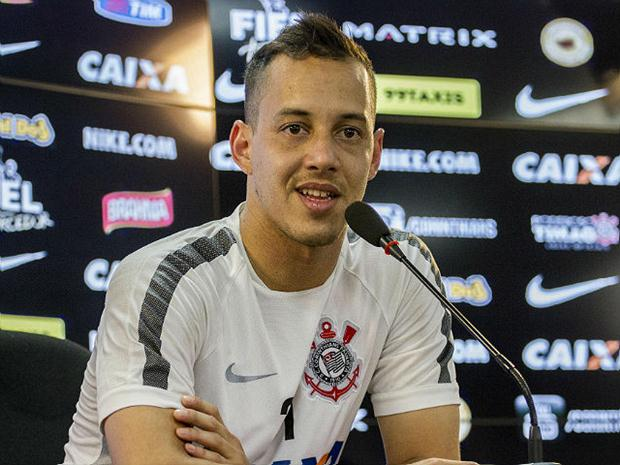
- Rodriguinho in 2015

Personal information
- Full name: Rodrigo Eduardo Costa Marinho
- Date of birth: 27 March 1988 (age 38)
- Place of birth: Natal, Brazil
- Height: 1.77 m (5 ft 9 1/2 in)
- Position: Attacking midfielder

Youth career
- 2006: ABC

Senior career*
Years	Team	Apps	(Gls)
2007–2009	ABC	31	(5)
2010–2011	Bragantino	65	(11)
2011–2013	América Mineiro	104	(22)
2013–2018	Corinthians	165	(32)
2014	→ Grêmio (loan)	12	(2)
2014–2015	→ Al Sharjah (loan)	29	(9)
2018	Pyramids	11	(0)
2019–2020	Cruzeiro	22	(8)
2020–2021	Bahia	93	(19)
2022–2023	Cuiabá	63	(16)

International career^{‡}
2017	Brazil	2	(0)
- * Club domestic league appearances and goals as of 02:04, 27 February 2023 (UTC) ‡ National team caps and goals as of 07:59, 7 February 2018 (UTC)

Rodrigo Eduardo Costa Marinho (born 27 March 1988), commonly known as Rodriguinho, is a Brazilian professional footballer who plays as an attacking midfielder.

Rodriguinho started his senior professional career with ABC in 2007. After stints with Bragantino and América Mineiro, he joined Corinthians in 2013. In the 2017 season, he became the joint top-scorer of his team with 11 goals. Rodriguinho made his international debut with the Brazil national team on 25 January 2017, against Colombia.

== Club career ==
=== Early career ===
Born in Natal, Rio Grande do Norte, Rodriguinho started his professional career with ABC in 2007. However, his playing time was limited and he considered becoming a professional futsal player. On 20 November 2009, he moved to Bragantino, with the club acquiring 30% of his rights. An undisputed starter, he also featured regularly for the reserves.

=== América Mineiro ===
On 11 May 2011, Rodriguinho moved to América Mineiro after agreeing to a deal which would keep him at the club until the end of 2012 Campeonato Mineiro. 11 days later, he made his first team debut in a league match against Bahia; scoring a goal in the 2–1 victory. On 30 July 2013, he scored a hat-trick and made two assists during a 5–0 victory against Sport Recife.

In August 2013, Rodriguinho played his 100th match for Coelho in a 1–1 draw against América-RN. Although in September, the club announced Rodriguinho's transfer to Qatari club El Jaish, the deal did not materialise It was later revealed that a problem in getting the work visa was the reason behind the deal getting cancelled. Nevertheless, Rodriguinho contributed with 25 goals in 103 matches for the club.

=== Corinthians ===
Rodriguinho moved to Corinthians on 30 September 2013 for $4 million, with the club acquiring 60% of his rights. In the following month, he made his debut in a 0–0 draw against Atlético Mineiro.

==== Loans to Grêmio and Al-Sharjah ====
On 14 April 2014, Rodriguinho joined Grêmio on a season long loan deal. However, after being rarely used, he left the club on 30 September. Two days later, he was loaned to Emirati club Al-Sharjah on a loan deal June 2015; joining three Brazilian compatriots at the club.

==== Breakthrough ====
Upon returning from loan in June 2015, Rodriguinho featured sparingly as the club won the 2015 Série A. From the 2016 season onwards, he became a regular starter for the club.

After being on the radar of several European clubs since July 2016, Corinthians rejected an offer from Turkish club Fenerbahçe in January 2017, to secure Rodriguinho's services. In the 2017 season, he became the joint top scorer of the club with 11 goals, with his side winning the Série A and Paulista.

=== Pyramids ===
On 21 July 2018, Egyptian side Pyramids FC announced the signing of Rodriguinho.

=== Cruzeiro ===
In January 2019, Rodriguinho returned to his home country after agreeing to a three-year deal with Cruzeiro, after the club paid a US$ 4 million fee. He was hampered by injuries during his spell at the club, and on 13 February 2020, he terminated his contract with the club.

=== Bahia ===
On 14 February 2020, one day after leaving Cruzeiro, Rodriguinho signed a contract with Bahia until December 2021. He was a regular starter for his new side, but suffered top tier relegation in 2021.

=== Cuiabá ===
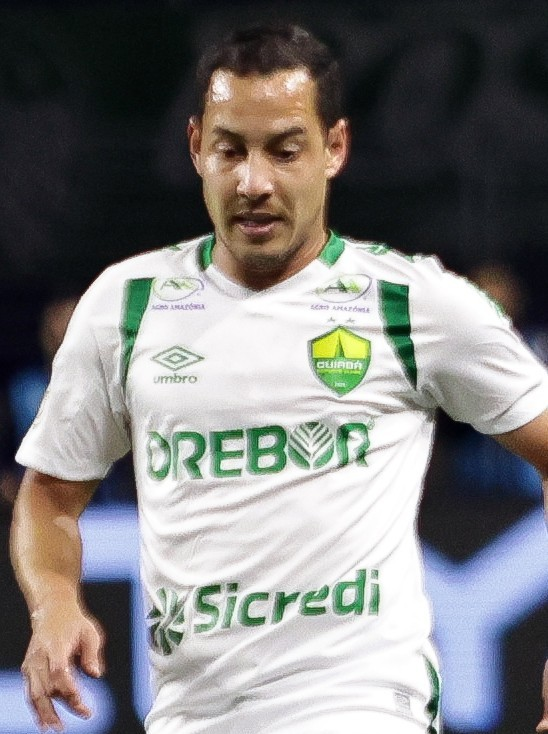
Rodriguinho with Cuiabá in 2022

On 30 December 2021, Rodriguinho was announced as one of the eight additions of Cuiabá.

== International career ==
In January 2017, Rodriguinho was called to the national team for a friendly match against Colombia. He made his full international debut in on 26 January, replacing Willian Arão at half-time in the 1–0 win.

== Personal life ==
In September 2012, Rodriguinho suffered a car accident after having lost control over the vehicle. Although he denied being drunk, he accepted the fact that his driving license had expired when he was driving the car.

== Career statistics ==
As of 26 February 2023.

Club	Season	National League			State League		Cup		Continental		Other		Total	
Club	Season	Division	Apps	Goals	Apps	Goals	Apps	Goals	Apps	Goals	Apps	Goals	Apps	Goals
ABC	2007	Série C	4	0	1	0	—		—		—		5	0
ABC	2008	Série B	1	0	11	5	2	0	—		—		14	5
ABC	2009	Série B	6	0	8	0	2	0	—		—		16	0
ABC	Total		11	0	20	5	4	0	—		—		35	5
Bragantino	2010	Série B	29	8	18	2	0	0	—		—		47	10
Bragantino	2011	Série B	0	0	18	1	0	0	—		—		18	1
Bragantino	Total		29	8	36	3	0	0	—		—		65	11
América Mineiro	2011	Série A	36	6	0	0	0	0	—		—		36	6
América Mineiro	2012	Série B	22	4	13	2	4	0	—		—		39	6
América Mineiro	2013	Série B	17	8	6	1	6	1	—		—		29	10
América Mineiro	Total		75	18	19	3	10	1	—		—		104	22
Corinthians	2013	Série A	8	0	0	0	0	0	—		—		8	0
Corinthians	2014	Série A	0	0	7	0	0	0	—		—		7	0
Corinthians	2015	Série A	12	2	0	0	0	0	—		—		12	2
Corinthians	2016	Série A	29	4	10	3	4	3	6 (Note: Appearances in Copa Libertadores)	0	—		49	10
Corinthians	2017	Série A	32	3	14	4	5	2	5 (Note: Appearances in Copa Sudamericana)	2	—		56	11
Corinthians	2018	Série A	11	5	15	4	2	0	5	0	—		33	9
Corinthians	Total		92	14	46	11	11	9	16	2	—		165	32
Grêmio (loan)	2014	Série A	11	2	0	0	0	0	1	0	—		12	2
Al-Sharjah (loan)	2014–15	UAE Pro-League	20	5	—		8	4	—		—		28	9
Pyramids	2018–19	Egyptian Premier League	8	0	—		0	0	—		—		8	0
Cruzeiro	2019	Série A	5	1	9	4	1	0	5	3	—		20	8
Cruzeiro	2020	Série B	0	0	2	0	0	0	—		—		2	0
Cruzeiro	Total		5	1	11	4	1	0	5	3	—		22	8
Bahia	2020	Série A	24	7	1	0	0	0	5	0	7 (Note: Appearances in Copa do Nordeste)	2	37	9
Bahia	2021	Série A	25	3	0	0	6	2	5	1	11	3	47	9
Bahia	Total		49	10	1	0	6	2	10	1	18	5	84	18
Cuiabá	2022	Série A	33	3	11	8	4	2	3	0	—		51	13
Cuiabá	2023	Série A	0	0	7	3	1	0	—		—		8	3
Cuiabá	Total		33	3	18	11	5	2	3	0	—		59	16
Career total			326	59	151	37	45	14	35	6	18	5	575	121

== Honours ==
ABC

- Campeonato Potiguar: 2007, 2008

Corinthians

- Campeonato Brasileiro Série A: 2015, 2017
- Campeonato Paulista: 2017, 2018

Cruzeiro

- Campeonato Mineiro: 2019

Bahia

- Campeonato Baiano: 2020
- Copa do Nordeste: 2021

Cuiabá

- Campeonato Mato-Grossense: 2022, 2023

=== Individual ===
- Campeonato Paulista Team of the Year: 2017, 2018
