= Willian (footballer, born 1986) =

Brazilian footballer

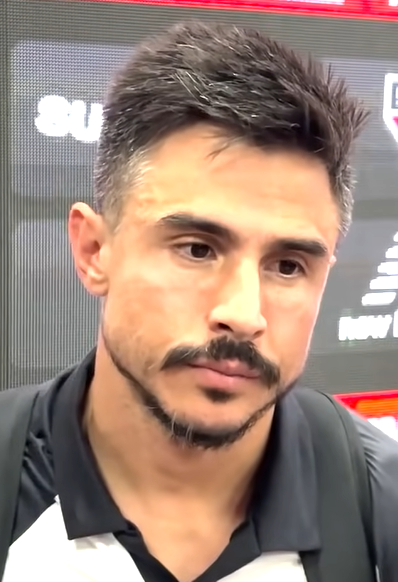
- Willian in 2024

Personal information
- Full name: Willian Gomes de Siqueira
- Date of birth: 19 November 1986 (age 39)
- Place of birth: Três Fronteiras, Brazil
- Height: 1.70 m (5 ft 7 in)
- Position: Forward

Team information
- Current team: América Mineiro
- Number: 9

Youth career
- 2002–2003: Guarani

Senior career*
| Years | Team | Apps | (Gls) |
| 2004–2005 | Guarani | 18 | (2) |
| 2006–2010 | Atlético Paranaense | 47 | (9) |
| 2009 | → Vila Nova (loan) | 29 | (8) |
| 2010–2012 | Tombense | 0 | (0) |
| 2010 | → Figueirense (loan) | 49 | (25) |
| 2011–2012 | → Corinthians (loan) | 71 | (15) |
| 2012–2014 | Metalist Kharkiv | 25 | (4) |
| 2013–2014 | → Cruzeiro (loan) | 51 | (10) |
| 2014–2017 | Cruzeiro | 90 | (18) |
| 2017–2021 | Palmeiras | 189 | (50) |
| 2022–2023 | Fluminense | 45 | (4) |
| 2023 | → Athletico Paranaense (loan) | 18 | (4) |
| 2024–2025 | Santos | 39 | (7) |
| 2025– | América Mineiro | 70 | (16) |
- * Club domestic league appearances and goals as of 18 November 2026

Willian Gomes de Siqueira (born 19 November 1986), simply known as Willian or by the nickname Willian Bigode, is a Brazilian professional footballer who plays as a forward for América Mineiro.

== Career ==
=== Early career ===
Born in Três Fronteiras, São Paulo, Willian joined Guarani's youth setup in 2002. He made his first team – and Série A – debut on 22 August 2004, coming on as a second half substitute for Sandro Hiroshi in a 1–1 home draw against Vasco da Gama.

Willian appeared rarely for the club during the season, as his side suffered relegation. He appeared more regularly in the following year, but was still sparingly used.

=== Atlético Paranaense ===
On 23 December 2005, Willian signed for Atlético Paranaense. He scored his first goal in the top tier for the club on 30 August 2006, netting the winner in a 2–1 home win against Santos.

Willian was rarely used in the following years, also suffering a knee injury in 2007. On 3 February 2009, he was loaned to Vila Nova until December.

While on loan, Willian scored eight goals during the year's Série B, being the club's top goalscorer as his side avoided relegation. Highlights included braces against Campinense (two times) and América de Natal.

On 26 January 2010, after returning from loan, Willian rescinded his contract with Atlético.

=== Figueirense ===
In February 2010, Willian joined Figueirense. He was the top goalscorer of Campeonato Catarinense with 13 goals in only 15 matches, being also elected the best player of the tournament.

Willian also scored a further 12 goals during the Série B championship, being one of the key units as the club achieved top level promotion as second.

=== Corinthians ===
On 3 January 2011, Willian signed for Corinthians, with Atlético still retaining part ownership. He made his debut for the club late in the month, replacing Morais in a 2–2 draw at São Bernardo.

Willian scored his first goals for Timão on 13 March 2011, netting a brace in a 3–2 away win against Mirassol. Mainly used as a substitute during the Campeonato Paulista, he became a regular starter for the club during the year's Brasileirão; he scored a double in a 2–0 home win against Fluminense on 12 June.

Willian also appeared regularly in 2012 Copa Libertadores, helping Corinthians to lift their first-ever title in the competition.

=== Metalist Kharkiv ===
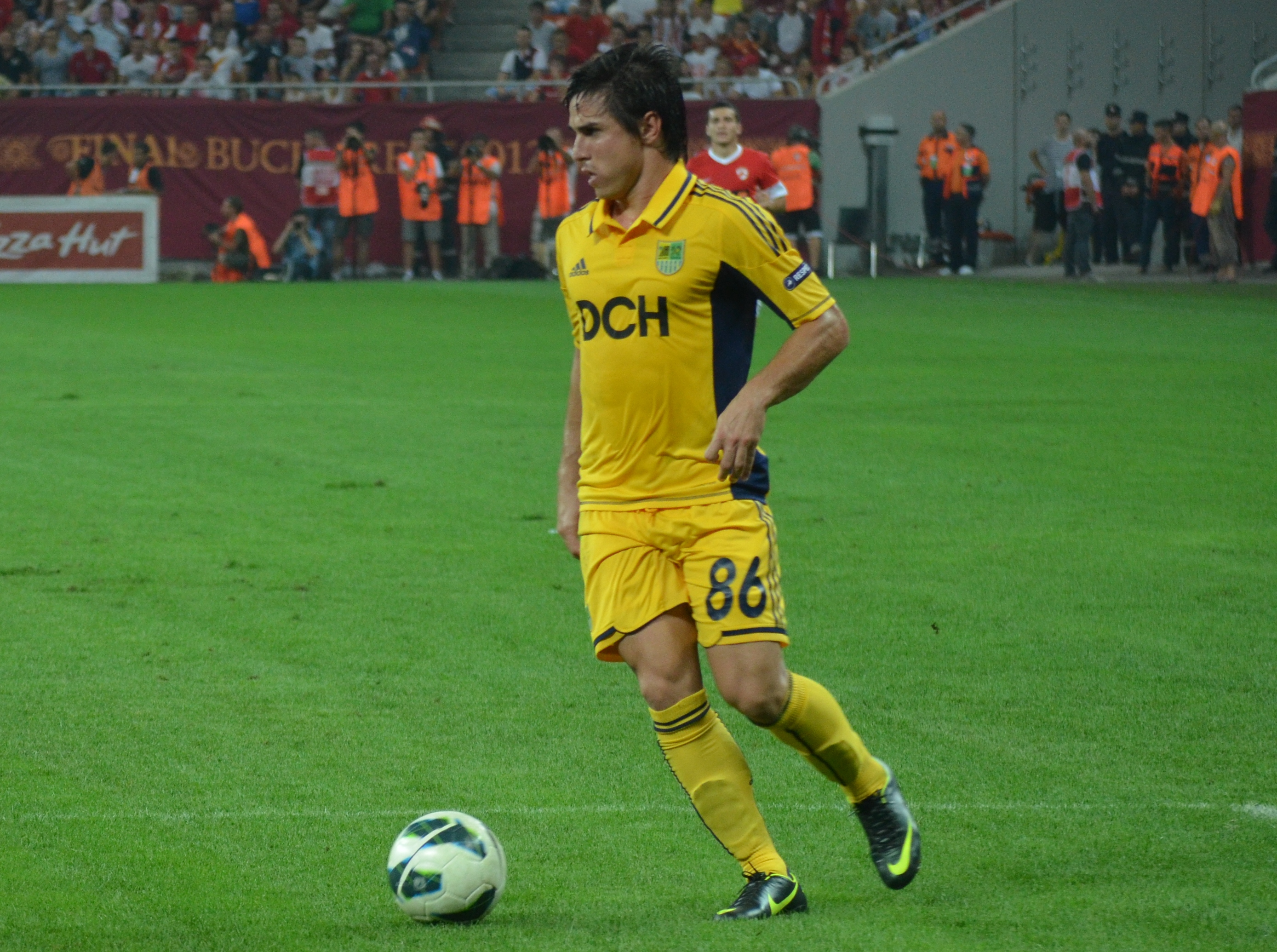
Willian in a match with Metalist Kharkiv in 2012.

On 2 July 2012, Willian moved abroad, signing for Ukrainian Premier League club FC Metalist Kharkiv. He scored his first goal abroad on 18 August, netting the second in a 3–0 win at FC Hoverla Uzhhorod.

Willian made his continental debut on 23 August 2012, starting in a 2–0 away win against FC Dinamo București in the UEFA Europa League. Again mainly used as a substitute, he returned to his homeland in the following year.

=== Cruzeiro ===
On 14 July 2013, Willian signed a one-year loan deal with Cruzeiro, with Diego Souza moving permanently in the opposite direction. Roughly one year later, he was bought outright for a fee of €3.5 million; he also appeared regularly as his side achieved back-to-back Brasileirão titles in 2013 and 2014.

During the 2015 campaign, Willian became an undisputed starter under new manager Mano Menezes; during the manager's debut on 6 September, he scored four goals in a 5–1 home routing of Figueirense.

=== Palmeiras ===
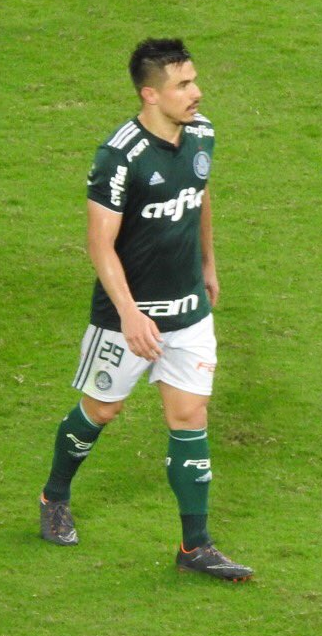
Willian playing for Palmeiras in 2018

On 11 January 2017, Willian signed for Palmeiras after being involved in an exchange with Robinho. Regularly used in his first year, he won the 2018 Série A with the club, and finished the year with 17 goals overall.

After scoring another 16 goals in 2018, Willian spent most of the 2019 campaign sidelined due to a knee injury. In the 2020 season, he won the Campeonato Paulista, the Copa do Brasil and the Copa Libertadores, but did not feature in the latter's Final.

On 26 June 2021, Willian renewed his contract with Verdão until December 2022. On 20 December, however, he left the club amidst an offer from Fluminense.

=== Fluminense ===
On 21 December 2021, Willian was announced at Flu on a two-year deal. He scored his first goal for the club on 10 February 2022, netting the equalizer in a 2–1 Campeonato Carioca home win over rivals Botafogo.

Mainly a backup to Germán Cano, Willian won two consecutive Carioca titles with the club, but featured very rarely in the 2023 campaign.

==== Loan to Athletico Paranaense ====
On 20 March 2023, Fluminense announced the loan of Willian to Athletico Paranaense until the end of the year. He was also a backup option during his second spell at Furacão, but still scored four goals.

=== Santos ===
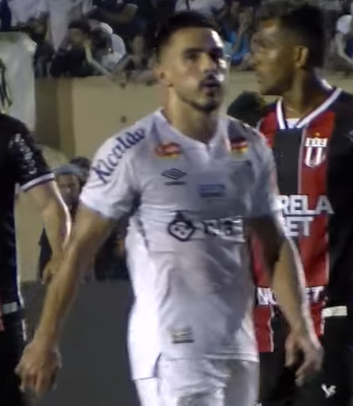
Willian playing for Santos in 2024

On 28 December 2023, Santos announced the signing of Willian on a one-year deal. He made his debut for the club the following 20 January, replacing Julio Furch in a 1–0 away win over Botafogo-SP.

Willian scored his first goal for Peixe on 11 February 2024, netting his team's second in a 2–2 away draw against Mirassol.

=== América Mineiro ===
On 28 February 2025, Willian terminated his link with Santos and joined América Mineiro.

== Career statistics ==
As of 18 November 2024

Appearances and goals by club, season and competition
| Club | Season | League | | | State League | | Cup | | Continental | | Other | | Total | |
| Club | Season | Division | Apps | Goals | Apps | Goals | Apps | Goals | Apps | Goals | Apps | Goals | Apps | Goals |
|---|---|---|---|---|---|---|---|---|---|---|---|---|---|---|
| Guarani | 2004 | Série A | 7 | 0 | — | | 0 | 0 | — | | — | | 7 | 0 |
| Guarani | 2005 | Série B | 7 | 1 | 4 | 1 | 0 | 0 | — | | — | | 11 | 2 |
| Guarani | Total | | 14 | 1 | 4 | 1 | 0 | 0 | 0 | 0 | 0 | 0 | 18 | 2 |
| Atlético Paranaense | 2006 | Série A | 15 | 4 | 3 | 1 | 1 | 0 | 0 | 0 | — | | 19 | 5 |
| Atlético Paranaense | 2007 | Série A | 5 | 1 | 0 | 0 | 0 | 0 | 0 | 0 | — | | 5 | 1 |
| Atlético Paranaense | 2008 | Série A | 6 | 0 | 18 | 3 | 1 | 0 | 0 | 0 | — | | 25 | 3 |
| Atlético Paranaense | Total | | 26 | 5 | 21 | 4 | 2 | 0 | 0 | 0 | 0 | 0 | 49 | 9 |
| Vila Nova (loan) | 2009 | Série B | 29 | 8 | 0 | 0 | 0 | 0 | — | | — | | 29 | 8 |
| Figueirense | 2010 | Série B | 34 | 12 | 15 | 13 | — | | — | | — | | 49 | 25 |
| Corinthians | 2011 | Série A | 36 | 6 | 16 | 4 | — | | 0 | 0 | — | | 52 | 10 |
| Corinthians | 2012 | Série A | 5 | 0 | 14 | 5 | — | | 8 (Note: Appearance(s) in Copa Libertadores) | 0 | — | | 27 | 5 |
| Corinthians | Total | | 41 | 6 | 30 | 9 | 0 | 0 | 8 | 0 | 0 | 0 | 79 | 15 |
| Metalist Kharkiv | 2012–13 | Premier League | 25 | 4 | — | | 2 | 0 | 10 (Note: Appearance(s) in UEFA Europa League) | 0 | — | | 37 | 4 |
| Cruzeiro | 2013 | Série A | 26 | 7 | — | | 2 | 1 | — | | — | | 28 | 8 |
| Cruzeiro | 2014 | Série A | 27 | 2 | 13 | 3 | 7 | 4 | 9 | 1 | — | | 56 | 10 |
| Cruzeiro | 2015 | Série A | 30 | 11 | 7 | 1 | 0 | 0 | 9 | 1 | — | | 46 | 13 |
| Cruzeiro | 2016 | Série A | 33 | 4 | 5 | 0 | 8 | 3 | — | | 1 (Note: Appearance(s) in Primeira Liga) | 0 | 47 | 7 |
| Cruzeiro | Total | | 116 | 24 | 25 | 4 | 15 | 8 | 18 | 2 | 1 | 0 | 177 | 38 |
| Palmeiras | 2017 | Série A | 26 | 7 | 16 | 5 | 3 | 1 | 7 | 4 | — | | 52 | 17 |
| Palmeiras | 2018 | Série A | 32 | 10 | 17 | 4 | 6 | 1 | 10 | 1 | — | | 65 | 16 |
| Palmeiras | 2019 | Série A | 22 | 4 | 0 | 0 | 2 | 0 | 4 | 0 | — | | 28 | 4 |
| Palmeiras | 2020 | Série A | 32 | 7 | 16 | 6 | 7 | 0 | 10 | 4 | 2 (Note: Appearance(s) in FIFA Club World Cup) | 0 | 67 | 17 |
| Palmeiras | 2021 | Série A | 20 | 4 | 8 | 3 | 2 | 1 | 4 | 2 | 1 (Note: Appearance(s) in Recopa Sudamericana) | 0 | 35 | 10 |
| Palmeiras | Total | | 132 | 32 | 57 | 18 | 20 | 3 | 35 | 11 | 3 | 0 | 247 | 64 |
| Fluminense | 2022 | Série A | 28 | 3 | 12 | 1 | 3 | 0 | 9 (Note: Four appearances and one goal in Copa Libertadores, five appearances and one goal in Copa Sudamericana) | 2 | — | | 52 | 6 |
| Fluminense | 2023 | Série A | 0 | 0 | 5 | 0 | 0 | 0 | 0 | 0 | — | | 5 | 0 |
| Fluminense | Total | | 28 | 3 | 17 | 1 | 3 | 0 | 9 | 2 | 0 | 0 | 57 | 6 |
| Athletico Paranaense (loan) | 2023 | Série A | 18 | 4 | — | | 3 | 0 | 2 | 0 | — | | 23 | 4 |
| Santos | 2024 | Série B | 29 | 5 | 10 | 2 | — | | — | | — | | 39 | 7 |
| Santos | 2025 | Série A | 0 | 0 | 0 | 0 | 0 | 0 | — | | — | | 0 | 0 |
| Santos | Total | | 29 | 5 | 10 | 2 | 0 | 0 | 0 | 0 | 0 | 0 | 39 | 7 |
| América Mineiro | 2025 | Série B | 0 | 0 | — | | 0 | 0 | — | | — | | 0 | 0 |
| Career total | | | 433 | 93 | 162 | 48 | 38 | 9 | 70 | 13 | 4 | 0 | 708 | 157 |

== Honours ==
Corinthians

- Campeonato Brasileiro Série A: 2011
- Copa Libertadores: 2012

Cruzeiro

- Campeonato Brasileiro Série A: 2013, 2014
- Campeonato Mineiro: 2014

Palmeiras

- Campeonato Brasileiro Série A: 2018
- Campeonato Paulista: 2020
- Copa do Brasil: 2020
- Copa Libertadores: 2020, 2021
- Recopa Sudamericana runner-up: 2021

Fluminense

- Taça Guanabara: 2022, 2023
- Campeonato Carioca: 2022, 2023

Santos

- Campeonato Brasileiro Série B: 2024

Individual

- Campeonato Catarinense Best player: 2010
- Campeonato Catarinense Team of the year: 2010
- Campeonato Paulista Team of the year: 2020
