= Victor Luis =

Brazilian footballer

Victor Luís
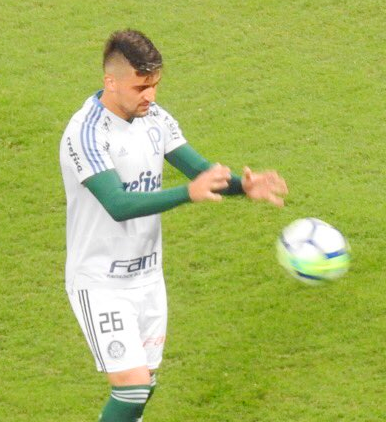
- Victor Luís with Palmeiras in 2018

Personal information
- Full name: Victor Luís Chuab Zamblauskas
- Date of birth: 23 June 1993 (age 33)
- Place of birth: São Paulo, Brazil
- Height: 1.77 m (5 ft 10 in)
- Position: Left-back

Team information
- Current team: Mirassol
- Number: 12

Youth career
- 2002: Portuguesa
- 2003–2012: Palmeiras

Senior career*
Years	Team	Apps	(Gls)
2012–2022	Palmeiras	137	(3)
2012–2013	→ Porto B (loan)	18	(1)
2015	→ Ceará (loan)	27	(3)
2016–2017	→ Botafogo (loan)	60	(2)
2020–2021	→ Botafogo (loan)	26	(2)
2022	→ Ceará (loan)	25	(0)
2023	Coritiba	37	(3)
2024–2026	Vasco da Gama	23	(1)
2026–	Mirassol	3	(0)
- * Club domestic league appearances and goals as of 19 March 2026

Victor Luís Chuab Zamblauskas (born 23 June 1993), known as Victor Luís, is a Brazilian footballer who plays as a left-back for Mirassol.

== Club career ==
Born in São Paulo, Victor Luis joined Palmeiras' youth categories in 2003, aged ten, after starting it out at Portuguesa. He progressed through the former's youth setup, always as a first-choice.

In July 2012 Victor Luis moved abroad for the first time in his career, after agreeing to a one-year loan deal at Porto B. On 12 August he made his professional debut, starting in a 2–2 away draw against Tondela in the Segunda Liga; he scored his first goal late in the month, netting a last-minute equalizer in a 1–1 draw at Portimonense through a free kick.

In June 2013 Victor Luis returned to Verdão, after appearing in 18 matches for Porto B. He was promoted to the main squad by manager Gilson Kleina, but was never used during the campaign, which ended in promotion.

Victor Luis made his Palmeiras debut on 9 March 2014, replacing Bruno César in the 64th minute of a 3–1 away win against Paulista. He made his Série A debut on 18 May, again from the bench in a 1–0 success at Vitória.

Victor Luis signed a new deal with the club on 30 July, running until 2017. He scored his first goal for Palmeiras on 17 September, netting the last of a 2–2 home draw against Flamengo.

The player has Lithuanian ancestry, so Brazilian media site spread rumors that he could choose to play for the Lithuanian national football team, then coached by Edgaras Jankauskas. The media claimed that the coach had already contacted the player about this option.

== Honours ==
Palmeiras

- Campeonato Brasileiro Série B: 2013
- Campeonato Brasileiro Série A: 2018
- Campeonato Paulista: 2020
- Copa Libertadores: 2021
- Recopa Sudamericana runner-up: 2021

=== Individual ===
- Campeonato Paulista Team of the year: 2018
