= List of Brazilian football transfers winter 2018–19 =

This is the 2018–19 winter transfer window for Brazilian football season 2018–19. Additionally, players without a club may join at any time, clubs may sign players on loan at any time, and clubs may sign a goalkeeper on an emergency loan if they have no registered goalkeeper available. It includes football transfers related to clubs from the Campeonato Brasileiro Série A and Campeonato Brasileiro Série B.

== Campeonato Brasileiro Série A ==
=== Athletico Paranaense ===
In: Note: Flags indicate national team as defined under FIFA eligibility rules; some limited exceptions apply. Players may hold more than one non-FIFA nationality.

No.	Pos.	Nation	Player

Out: Note: Flags indicate national team as defined under FIFA eligibility rules; some limited exceptions apply. Players may hold more than one non-FIFA nationality.

No.	Pos.	Nation	Player
7	MF	BRA	Raphael Veiga (loan return to Palmeiras)
92	FW	BRA	Pablo (to São Paulo)

=== Atlético Mineiro ===
In: Note: Flags indicate national team as defined under FIFA eligibility rules; some limited exceptions apply. Players may hold more than one non-FIFA nationality.

No.	Pos.	Nation	Player
—	DF	BRA	Guga (from Avaí)
—	DF	BRA	Igor Rabello (from Botafogo)
—	DF	BRA	Réver (from Internacional)
—	MF	BRA	Jair (from Sport Recife)

Out: Note: Flags indicate national team as defined under FIFA eligibility rules; some limited exceptions apply. Players may hold more than one non-FIFA nationality.

No.	Pos.	Nation	Player
8	MF	ARG	Tomás Andrade (loan return to (Argentina) River Plate)
95	FW	BRA	Denílson (on loan to (Saudi Arabia) Al-Faisaly)
—	DF	BRA	Capixaba (on loan to Vila Nova, previously on loan at Chapecoense)
—	DF	BRA	Jesiel (on loan to (Japan) Kawasaki Frontale, previously on loan at Paraná)
—	FW	BRA	Carlos (to (Portugal) Vitória de Setúbal, previously on loan at Paraná)

=== Avaí ===
In: Note: Flags indicate national team as defined under FIFA eligibility rules; some limited exceptions apply. Players may hold more than one non-FIFA nationality.

No.	Pos.	Nation	Player
—	GK	BRA	Lucas Frigeri (on loan from São Caetano)
—	FW	BRA	Gegê (from (Turkey) Adana Demirspor)

Out: Note: Flags indicate national team as defined under FIFA eligibility rules; some limited exceptions apply. Players may hold more than one non-FIFA nationality.

No.	Pos.	Nation	Player
1	GK	BRA	Kozlinski (to Atlético Goianiense)
7	FW	BRA	Rafinha (to (Mexico) Tapachula)
80	DF	BRA	Airton (to Ponte Preta)
90	DF	BRA	João Paulo (loan return to Tombense)
98	DF	BRA	Guga (to Atlético Mineiro)

=== Bahia ===
In: Note: Flags indicate national team as defined under FIFA eligibility rules; some limited exceptions apply. Players may hold more than one non-FIFA nationality.

No.	Pos.	Nation	Player
—	MF	BRA	Juninho (loan return from Ceará)
—	MF	BRA	Yuri (loan return from CSA)

Out: Note: Flags indicate national team as defined under FIFA eligibility rules; some limited exceptions apply. Players may hold more than one non-FIFA nationality.

No.	Pos.	Nation	Player
10	MF	BRA	Zé Rafael (to Palmeiras)
13	DF	BRA	Douglas Grolli (to (Portugal) Marítimo)
15	DF	BRA	Edson (loan return to Fluminense)

=== Botafogo ===
In: Note: Flags indicate national team as defined under FIFA eligibility rules; some limited exceptions apply. Players may hold more than one non-FIFA nationality.

No.	Pos.	Nation	Player
—	DF	BRA	Arnaldo (loan return from Ceará)
—	MF	BRA	Alan Santos (on loan from (Mexico) UANL, previously on loan at (United Arab Emirates) Al-Ittihad Kalba)

Out: Note: Flags indicate national team as defined under FIFA eligibility rules; some limited exceptions apply. Players may hold more than one non-FIFA nationality.

No.	Pos.	Nation	Player
1	GK	BRA	Jefferson (retired)
8	MF	BRA	Matheus Fernandes (to Palmeiras)
12	GK	BRA	Saulo (on loan to Vila Nova)
23	FW	BRA	Pachu (on loan to Boavista)
—	MF	BRA	Lucca Motta (to CSA)
—	FW	BRA	Renan Gorne (on loan to Volta Redonda, previously on loan at Paysandu)

=== Ceará ===
In: Note: Flags indicate national team as defined under FIFA eligibility rules; some limited exceptions apply. Players may hold more than one non-FIFA nationality.

No.	Pos.	Nation	Player
—	DF	BRA	Charles (from Paraná)
—	DF	BRA	Cristovam (on loan from Paraná, previously on loan at (South Korea) Bucheon 1995)
—	DF	BRA	Samuel Xavier (from Sport Recife, previously on loan)
—	MF	KOR	Chico (from (South Korea) Pohang Steelers)
—	MF	BRA	Felipe Silva (from (Japan) Sanfrecce Hiroshima)
—	MF	BRA	Fernando Sobral (from Sampaio Corrêa)
—	MF	BRA	William Oliveira (from Madureira)
—	FW	BRA	João Paulo (from São Paulo, previously on loan at Criciúma)
—	FW	BRA	Matheus Matias (on loan from Corinthians)
—	FW	BRA	Vitor Feijão (from Paraná, previously on loan at Criciúma)
—	FW	BRA	Willie (from (Switzerland) Servette)

Out: Note: Flags indicate national team as defined under FIFA eligibility rules; some limited exceptions apply. Players may hold more than one non-FIFA nationality.

No.	Pos.	Nation	Player
11	MF	BRA	Felipe Azevedo (to América Mineiro)
12	GK	BRA	Renan (to São Bento)
20	MF	BRA	Juninho (loan return to Bahia)
40	FW	BRA	Arthur (to Palmeiras)
89	DF	BRA	Arnaldo (loan return to Botafogo)
97	DF	BRA	Patrick (on loan to Vila Nova)

=== Chapecoense ===
In: Note: Flags indicate national team as defined under FIFA eligibility rules; some limited exceptions apply. Players may hold more than one non-FIFA nationality.

No.	Pos.	Nation	Player

Out: Note: Flags indicate national team as defined under FIFA eligibility rules; some limited exceptions apply. Players may hold more than one non-FIFA nationality.

No.	Pos.	Nation	Player
48	DF	BRA	Capixaba (loan return to Atlético Mineiro)

=== Corinthians ===
In: Note: Flags indicate national team as defined under FIFA eligibility rules; some limited exceptions apply. Players may hold more than one non-FIFA nationality.

No.	Pos.	Nation	Player
—	DF	BRA	Michel (from (Spain) Las Palmas)
—	DF	BRA	Richard (from Fluminense)
—	MF	BRA	Ramiro (from Grêmio)
—	FW	ARG	Mauro Boselli (from (Mexico) León)
—	FW	BRA	André Luis (from Cianorte)
—	FW	BRA	Gustavo Silva (from Coritiba)

Out: Note: Flags indicate national team as defined under FIFA eligibility rules; some limited exceptions apply. Players may hold more than one non-FIFA nationality.

No.	Pos.	Nation	Player
2	MF	BRA	Guilherme Mantuan (on loan to Ponte Preta)
13	DF	BRA	Guilherme Romão (on loan to São Bento)
20	MF	BRA	Danilo (to Vila Nova)
28	MF	BRA	Paulo Roberto (on loan to Fortaleza)
29	FW	BRA	Matheus Matias (on loan to Ceará)
47	FW	QAT	Emerson Sheik (retired)
—	MF	BRA	Marciel (re-loan to Oeste)
—	FW	TUR	Colin Kazim-Richards (on loan to (Mexico) Veracruz, previously on loan at (Mexico) BUAP)

=== Cruzeiro ===
In: Note: Flags indicate national team as defined under FIFA eligibility rules; some limited exceptions apply. Players may hold more than one non-FIFA nationality.

No.	Pos.	Nation	Player
—	DF	COL	Luis Orejuela (on loan from (Netherlands) Ajax)

Out: Note: Flags indicate national team as defined under FIFA eligibility rules; some limited exceptions apply. Players may hold more than one non-FIFA nationality.

No.	Pos.	Nation	Player
2	DF	BRA	Ezequiel (released)
20	MF	BRA	Bruno Silva (to Fluminense)
—	DF	BRA	Mayke (to Palmeiras, previously on loan)
—	MF	BRA	Eurico (to Villa Nova, previously on loan at Ipatinga)
—	MF	BRA	Gabriel Xavier (to (Japan) Nagoya Grampus, previously on loan)
—	MF	BRA	Thonny Anderson (to Grêmio, previously on loan)

=== CSA ===
In: Note: Flags indicate national team as defined under FIFA eligibility rules; some limited exceptions apply. Players may hold more than one non-FIFA nationality.

No.	Pos.	Nation	Player
—	GK	BRA	Fabrício (from Boa)
—	GK	BRA	João Carlos (from CRB)
—	MF	BRA	Gerson (from (Poland) } Lechia Gdańsk)
—	DF	BRA	Joazi (from Náutico)
—	DF	BRA	Luciano Castán (from (Qatar) Al-Khor)
—	DF	BRA	Régis (from São Paulo)
—	DF	BRA	Pedro Rosa (from Sertãozinho)
—	MF	BRA	Amaral (from Boa)
—	MF	BRA	Jhonnatan (from Náutico)
—	MF	BRA	Lucca Motta (from Botafogo U20)
—	MF	BRA	Matheus Sávio (on loan from Flamengo)
—	MF	BRA	Mauro Silva (from Bangu)
—	FW	BRA	Hiago (from (Sweden) Kalmar)
—	FW	BRA	Lohan (from Friburguense)
—	FW	BRA	Patrick Fabiano (from (Kuwait) Al-Salmiya)
—	FW	BRA	Thiaguinho (from Ponte Preta)

Out: Note: Flags indicate national team as defined under FIFA eligibility rules; some limited exceptions apply. Players may hold more than one non-FIFA nationality.

No.	Pos.	Nation	Player
5	MF	BRA	Yuri (loan return to Bahia)
7	FW	BRA	Neto Berola (to América Mineiro)
11	FW	BRA	Hugo Cabral (to Ponte Preta)

=== Flamengo ===
In: Note: Flags indicate national team as defined under FIFA eligibility rules; some limited exceptions apply. Players may hold more than one non-FIFA nationality.

No.	Pos.	Nation	Player
3	DF	BRA	Rodrigo Caio (from São Paulo)
9	FW	BRA	Gabriel Barbosa (on loan from (Italy) Inter Milan)
14	MF	URU	Giorgian De Arrascaeta (from Cruzeiro)
27	FW	BRA	Bruno Henrique (from Santos)

Out: Note: Flags indicate national team as defined under FIFA eligibility rules; some limited exceptions apply. Players may hold more than one non-FIFA nationality.

No.	Pos.	Nation	Player
11	MF	BRA	Lucas Paquetá (to (Italy) Milan)
17	FW	COL	Marlos Moreno (loan return to (England) Manchester City)
22	MF	BRA	Matheus Sávio (on loan to CSA)
27	MF	BRA	Rômulo (on loan to Grêmio)
—	DF	BRA	Rafael Vaz (to Goiás, previously on loan at Universidad de Chile)
19	FW	BRA	Henrique Dourado (to (China) Henan Jianye)

=== Fluminense ===
In: Note: Flags indicate national team as defined under FIFA eligibility rules; some limited exceptions apply. Players may hold more than one non-FIFA nationality.

No.	Pos.	Nation	Player
2	DF	BRA	Gilberto (re-loan from (Italy) Fiorentina)
—	DF	BRA	Matheus Ferraz (from América Mineiro)
—	MF	BRA	Mateus Gonçalves (from (Mexico) Tijuana, previously on loan at Sport Recife)
—	MF	BRA	Bruno Silva (from Cruzeiro)

Out: Note: Flags indicate national team as defined under FIFA eligibility rules; some limited exceptions apply. Players may hold more than one non-FIFA nationality.

No.	Pos.	Nation	Player
6	DF	BRA	Ayrton Lucas (to (Russia) Spartak Moscow)
22	GK	BRA	Júlio César (to Grêmio)
25	MF	BRA	Richard (to Corinthians)
—	DF	BRA	Giovanni (to Ponte Preta, previously on loan at América Mineiro)
—	DF	BRA	Léo Pelé (to São Paulo)

=== Fortaleza ===
In: Note: Flags indicate national team as defined under FIFA eligibility rules; some limited exceptions apply. Players may hold more than one non-FIFA nationality.

No.	Pos.	Nation	Player
—	GK	BRA	Felipe Alves (from Athletico Paranaense)
—	DF	BRA	Carlinhos (from América Mineiro)
—	DF	BRA	Patrick (on loan from Ferroviária)
—	MF	BRA	Diego Ferreira (on loan from Tombense)
—	MF	BRA	Edinho (on loan from Atlético Mineiro)
—	MF	BRA	Madson (from (Qatar) Al-Khor)
—	MF	BRA	Paulo Roberto (on loan from Corinthians)
—	FW	BRA	Pedro Júnior (from (Japan) Kashima Antlers, previously on loan at (China) Wuhan Zall)
—	FW	BRA	Júnior Santos (from Ituano, previously on loan at Ponte Preta)

Out: Note: Flags indicate national team as defined under FIFA eligibility rules; some limited exceptions apply. Players may hold more than one non-FIFA nationality.

No.	Pos.	Nation	Player
3	DF	BRA	Diego Jussani (to América Mineiro)
19	FW	BRA	Wilson (to Mirassol)
27	MF	BRA	Nenê Bonilha (loan return to (Portugal) Vitória de Setúbal)

=== Goiás ===
In: Note: Flags indicate national team as defined under FIFA eligibility rules; some limited exceptions apply. Players may hold more than one non-FIFA nationality.

No.	Pos.	Nation	Player
—	GK	BRA	Sidão (from São Paulo)
—	DF	PER	Nilson Loyola (from (Peru) Melgar)
—	DF	BRA	Rafael Vaz (from Flamengo, previously on loan at Universidad de Chile)
—	FW	BRA	Júnior Brandão (on loan from (Bulgaria) Ludogorets Razgrad)

Out: Note: Flags indicate national team as defined under FIFA eligibility rules; some limited exceptions apply. Players may hold more than one non-FIFA nationality.

No.	Pos.	Nation	Player
17	FW	BRA	Júnior Viçosa (to América Mineiro)

=== Grêmio ===
In: Note: Flags indicate national team as defined under FIFA eligibility rules; some limited exceptions apply. Players may hold more than one non-FIFA nationality.

No.	Pos.	Nation	Player
9	FW	BRA	Diego Tardelli (from (China) Shandong Luneng)
10	FW	BRA	Felipe Vizeu (on loan from (Italy) Udinese)
13	MF	BRA	Rômulo (on loan from Flamengo)
16	MF	BRA	Thaciano (from Boa Esporte, previously on loan)
18	FW	BRA	Luciano (from (Spain) Leganés, previously on loan at Fluminense)
20	MF	ARG	Walter Montoya (on loan from (Mexico) Cruz Azul)
22	GK	BRA	Julio César (from Fluminense)
27	MF	BRA	Thonny Anderson (from Cruzeiro, previously on loan)
29	DF	BRA	Juninho Capixaba (from Corinthians, previously on loan)
33	DF	BRA	David Braz (from Santos)
38	DF	BRA	Rodrigues (from ABC, previously on loan)
42	DF	BRA	Rafael Galhardo (on loan from Vasco)
90	FW	BRA	André (from Sport, previously on loan)

Out: Note: Flags indicate national team as defined under FIFA eligibility rules; some limited exceptions apply. Players may hold more than one non-FIFA nationality.

No.	Pos.	Nation	Player
1	GK	BRA	Marcelo Grohe (to (Saudi Arabia) Al-Ittihad)
9	FW	BRA	Jael (to (Japan) FC Tokyo)
10	MF	BRA	Douglas (end of contract)
14	MF	BRA	Kaio (on loan to Sport)
15	FW	BRA	Vico (on loan to Ponte Preta)
17	MF	BRA	Lincoln (to (Portugal) Santa Clara)
20	MF	ARG	Walter Montoya (loan return to (Mexico) Cruz Azul)
21	DF	BRA	Madson (on loan to Athletico Paranaense)
22	DF	BRA	Bressan (to (United States) FC Dallas)
27	MF	BRA	Thonny Anderson (on loan to Athletico Paranaense)
30	FW	BRA	Marinho (to Santos)
77	MF	BRA	Cícero (end of contract)
—	GK	BRA	Bruno Grassi (to Criciúma)
—	GK	BRA	Leo (to Rio Ave, previously on loan)
—	DF	BRA	Breno (to Londrina, previously on loan at Figueirense)
—	DF	BRA	Iago (to Veranópolis, previously on loan at Criciúma)
—	DF	BRA	Rafael Thyere (on loan to Sport)
—	MF	BRA	Lima (on loan to Ceará, previously on loan at (United Arab Emirates) Al-Wasl)
—	MF	BRA	Moisés (end of contract, previously on loan at Londrina)
—	MF	BRA	Ramiro (to Corinthians)
—	FW	BRA	Batista (end of contract, previously on loan at Atlético Tubarão)
—	FW	BRA	Guilherme (on loan to Sport, previously on loan at Coritiba)
—	FW	BRA	Henrique Almeida (on loan to Chapecoense, previously on loan at (Portugal) Belenenses)
—	FW	BRA	Nicolas Careca (to (Portugal) Estoril, previously on loan at (Ukraine) Vorskla Poltava)
—	FW	BRA	Tetê (to (Ukraine) Shakhtar Donetsk)
—	FW	BRA	Yuri Mamute (on loan to Figueirense, previously on loan at Água Santa)

=== Internacional ===
In: Note: Flags indicate national team as defined under FIFA eligibility rules; some limited exceptions apply. Players may hold more than one non-FIFA nationality.

No.	Pos.	Nation	Player
—	FW	BRA	Neílton (from Vitória)

Out: Note: Flags indicate national team as defined under FIFA eligibility rules; some limited exceptions apply. Players may hold more than one non-FIFA nationality.

No.	Pos.	Nation	Player
9	FW	BRA	Leandro Damião (loan return to Santos)
23	DF	BRA	Thales (on loan to Vitória)
—	FW	BRA	Andrigo (on loan to Vitória)

=== Palmeiras ===
In: Note: Flags indicate national team as defined under FIFA eligibility rules; some limited exceptions apply. Players may hold more than one non-FIFA nationality.

No.	Pos.	Nation	Player
1	GK	BRA	Fernando Prass (re-signed)
2	DF	BRA	Marcos Rocha (from Atlético MG, previously on loan)
3	DF	BRA	Edu Dracena (re-signed)
11	MF	BRA	Ricardo Goulart (on loan from (China) Guangzhou Evergrande)
12	DF	BRA	Mayke (from Cruzeiro, previously on loan)
42	GK	BRA	Jailson (re-signed)
—	MF	BRA	Matheus Fernandes (from Botafogo)
—	MF	BRA	Raphael Veiga (loan return from Athletico Paranaense)
—	MF	BRA	Zé Rafael (from Bahia)
—	FW	BRA	Arthur (from Ceará)
—	FW	BRA	Carlos Eduardo (from (Egypt) Pyramids)
—	FW	BRA	Felipe Pires (on loan from (Germany) 1899 Hoffenheim)

Out: Note: Flags indicate national team as defined under FIFA eligibility rules; some limited exceptions apply. Players may hold more than one non-FIFA nationality.

No.	Pos.	Nation	Player
—	GK	BRA	Vagner (on loan to Novorizontino, previously on loan at Londrina)
—	GK	BRA	Vinícius Silvestre (on loan to CRB, previously on loan at Ponte Preta)
—	MF	BRA	Juninho (to Figueirense, previously on loan at Vila Nova)

=== Santos ===
In: Note: Flags indicate national team as defined under FIFA eligibility rules; some limited exceptions apply. Players may hold more than one non-FIFA nationality.

No.	Pos.	Nation	Player

Out: Note: Flags indicate national team as defined under FIFA eligibility rules; some limited exceptions apply. Players may hold more than one non-FIFA nationality.

No.	Pos.	Nation	Player
8	MF	BRA	Renato (retired)
—	FW	BRA	Leandro Damião (to (Japan) Kawasaki Frontale, previously on loan at Internacional)

=== São Paulo ===
In: Note: Flags indicate national team as defined under FIFA eligibility rules; some limited exceptions apply. Players may hold more than one non-FIFA nationality.

No.	Pos.	Nation	Player
—	GK	BRA	Tiago Volpi (on loan from (Mexico) Querétaro)
—	DF	BRA	Léo Pelé (from Fluminense)
—	DF	BRA	Igor Vinícius (on loan from Ituano)
—	MF	BRA	Hernanes (from Hebei China Fortune)
—	FW	BRA	Biro Biro (from (China) Shanghai Shenxin)
—	FW	BRA	Pablo (from Atlético Paranaense)

Out: Note: Flags indicate national team as defined under FIFA eligibility rules; some limited exceptions apply. Players may hold more than one non-FIFA nationality.

No.	Pos.	Nation	Player
1	GK	BRA	Sidão (to Goiás)
3	DF	BRA	Rodrigo Caio (to Flamengo)
33	DF	BRA	Régis (to CSA)
—	DF	BRA	Auro Jr. (to (Canada) Toronto, previously on loan)
—	FW	BRA	João Paulo (to Ceará, previously on loan at Criciúma)

=== Vasco da Gama ===
In: Note: Flags indicate national team as defined under FIFA eligibility rules; some limited exceptions apply. Players may hold more than one non-FIFA nationality.

No.	Pos.	Nation	Player
—	MF	BRA	Bruno César (from (Portugal) Sporting CP)
—	FW	BRA	Ribamar (from (Saudi Arabia) Ohod)

Out: Note: Flags indicate national team as defined under FIFA eligibility rules; some limited exceptions apply. Players may hold more than one non-FIFA nationality.

No.	Pos.	Nation	Player
1	GK	URU	Martín Silva (to (Paraguay) Libertad)
13	DF	BRA	Rafael Marques (to Boavista)

== Campeonato Brasileiro Série B ==
=== América Mineiro ===
In: Note: Flags indicate national team as defined under FIFA eligibility rules; some limited exceptions apply. Players may hold more than one non-FIFA nationality.

No.	Pos.	Nation	Player
—	DF	BRA	Diego Jussani (from Fortaleza)
—	DF	BRA	João Paulo (from Figueirense)
—	DF	BRA	Leandro Silva (from Coritiba)
—	MF	BRA	Felipe Azevedo (from Ceará)
—	FW	BRA	Júnior Viçosa (from Goiás)
—	FW	BRA	Marcelo Toscano (from (Japan) Omiya Ardija)
—	FW	BRA	Neto Berola (from CSA)

Out: Note: Flags indicate national team as defined under FIFA eligibility rules; some limited exceptions apply. Players may hold more than one non-FIFA nationality.

No.	Pos.	Nation	Player
3	DF	BRA	Matheus Ferraz (to Fluminense)
14	DF	BRA	Giovanni (loan return to Fluminense)
17	MF	BRA	Gérson Magrão (to Ponte Preta)
21	MF	BRA	Ruy (loan return to Coritiba)

=== Atlético Goianiense ===
In: Note: Flags indicate national team as defined under FIFA eligibility rules; some limited exceptions apply. Players may hold more than one non-FIFA nationality.

No.	Pos.	Nation	Player
—	GK	BRA	Kozlinski (from Avaí)
—	MF	BRA	Jatobá (on loan from (Portugal) Sporting CP)
—	MF	BRA	Matheuzinho (from (Mexico) Juárez)

Out: Note: Flags indicate national team as defined under FIFA eligibility rules; some limited exceptions apply. Players may hold more than one non-FIFA nationality.

No.	Pos.	Nation	Player

=== Botafogo-SP ===
In: Note: Flags indicate national team as defined under FIFA eligibility rules; some limited exceptions apply. Players may hold more than one non-FIFA nationality.

No.	Pos.	Nation	Player

Out: Note: Flags indicate national team as defined under FIFA eligibility rules; some limited exceptions apply. Players may hold more than one non-FIFA nationality.

No.	Pos.	Nation	Player

=== Bragantino ===
In: Note: Flags indicate national team as defined under FIFA eligibility rules; some limited exceptions apply. Players may hold more than one non-FIFA nationality.

No.	Pos.	Nation	Player

Out: Note: Flags indicate national team as defined under FIFA eligibility rules; some limited exceptions apply. Players may hold more than one non-FIFA nationality.

No.	Pos.	Nation	Player
3	DF	BRA	Guilherme Mattis (to CRB)

=== Brasil de Pelotas ===
In: Note: Flags indicate national team as defined under FIFA eligibility rules; some limited exceptions apply. Players may hold more than one non-FIFA nationality.

No.	Pos.	Nation	Player
—	MF	BRA	Washington (from Renofa Yamaguchi)

Out: Note: Flags indicate national team as defined under FIFA eligibility rules; some limited exceptions apply. Players may hold more than one non-FIFA nationality.

No.	Pos.	Nation	Player
—	DF	BRA	Tiago Cametá (to Vila Nova)

=== Coritiba ===
In: Note: Flags indicate national team as defined under FIFA eligibility rules; some limited exceptions apply. Players may hold more than one non-FIFA nationality.

No.	Pos.	Nation	Player

Out: Note: Flags indicate national team as defined under FIFA eligibility rules; some limited exceptions apply. Players may hold more than one non-FIFA nationality.

No.	Pos.	Nation	Player
23	DF	BRA	Chiquinho (to Meizhou Hakka)
28	DF	BRA	Leandro Silva (to América Mineiro)
94	GK	BRA	Samuel (to Portimonense)
—	MF	BRA	Ruy (on loan to Vitória, previously on loan at América Mineiro)
—	FW	BRA	Gustavo Silva (to Corinthians)

=== CRB ===
In: Note: Flags indicate national team as defined under FIFA eligibility rules; some limited exceptions apply. Players may hold more than one non-FIFA nationality.

No.	Pos.	Nation	Player
—	GK	BRA	Vinícius Silvestre (on loan from Palmeiras, previously on loan at Ponte Preta)
—	DF	BRA	Bonfim (from Juventude)
—	DF	BRA	Edson (from (Iran) Gostaresh Foulad)
—	DF	BRA	Ferrugem (from (Japan) Ventforet Kofu)
—	DF	BRA	Guilherme Mattis (from Bragantino)
—	DF	BRA	João Paulo (from Tombense, previously on loan at Avaí)
—	DF	BRA	Júnior (from Paraná)
—	DF	BRA	Wellington Carvalho (from Tombense, previously on loan)
—	MF	BRA	Hudson (from (Estonia) JK Järve)
—	MF	BRA	Lucas (from Juventude)
—	MF	BRA	Mateus Silva (from Guarani)
—	FW	BRA	Danillo Bala (on loan from São Bento, previously on loan at Campinense)
—	FW	BRA	Hugo (on loan from Pelotas, previously on loan at Juventude)
—	FW	BRA	Vitinho (from Ponte Preta)
—	FW	BRA	William Barbio (from Boa)

Out: Note: Flags indicate national team as defined under FIFA eligibility rules; some limited exceptions apply. Players may hold more than one non-FIFA nationality.

No.	Pos.	Nation	Player
1	GK	BRA	João Carlos (to CSA)
7	FW	BRA	Willians (to (Qatar) Al-Khor)
14	MF	BRA	Tinga (to (Bolivia) San José)

=== Criciúma ===
In: Note: Flags indicate national team as defined under FIFA eligibility rules; some limited exceptions apply. Players may hold more than one non-FIFA nationality.

No.	Pos.	Nation	Player
—	GK	BRA	Bruno Grassi (from Grêmio)
—	MF	BRA	Reis (from Vila Nova)

Out: Note: Flags indicate national team as defined under FIFA eligibility rules; some limited exceptions apply. Players may hold more than one non-FIFA nationality.

No.	Pos.	Nation	Player
7	FW	BRA	João Paulo (loan return to São Paulo)
8	DF	BRA	Iago (loan return to Grêmio)
11	FW	BRA	Vitor Feijão (loan return to Paraná)

=== Cuiabá ===
In: Note: Flags indicate national team as defined under FIFA eligibility rules; some limited exceptions apply. Players may hold more than one non-FIFA nationality.

No.	Pos.	Nation	Player

Out: Note: Flags indicate national team as defined under FIFA eligibility rules; some limited exceptions apply. Players may hold more than one non-FIFA nationality.

No.	Pos.	Nation	Player

=== Figueirense ===
In: Note: Flags indicate national team as defined under FIFA eligibility rules; some limited exceptions apply. Players may hold more than one non-FIFA nationality.

No.	Pos.	Nation	Player
—	MF	BRA	Juninho (from Palmeiras, previously on loan at Vila Nova)

Out: Note: Flags indicate national team as defined under FIFA eligibility rules; some limited exceptions apply. Players may hold more than one non-FIFA nationality.

No.	Pos.	Nation	Player
16	DF	BRA	João Paulo (to América Mineiro)
19	FW	BRA	Henan (to São Bento)
20	FW	BRA	Renan Mota (to (Japan) Kyoto Sanga)
22	MF	BRA	Lucas Marques (loan return to Vitória)
26	DF	BRA	Diego Renan (to Ponte Preta)

=== Guarani ===
In: Note: Flags indicate national team as defined under FIFA eligibility rules; some limited exceptions apply. Players may hold more than one non-FIFA nationality.

No.	Pos.	Nation	Player
—	DF	BRA	Inácio (on loan from Porto B)
—	MF	BRA	Carlinhos (on loan from Standard Liège)

Out: Note: Flags indicate national team as defined under FIFA eligibility rules; some limited exceptions apply. Players may hold more than one non-FIFA nationality.

No.	Pos.	Nation	Player
4	DF	BRA	Fabrício (to (Mexico) Veracruz)
11	FW	BRA	Erik (to (Portugal) Aves)
—	MF	BRA	Mateus Silva (to CRB)

=== Londrina ===
In: Note: Flags indicate national team as defined under FIFA eligibility rules; some limited exceptions apply. Players may hold more than one non-FIFA nationality.

No.	Pos.	Nation	Player

Out: Note: Flags indicate national team as defined under FIFA eligibility rules; some limited exceptions apply. Players may hold more than one non-FIFA nationality.

No.	Pos.	Nation	Player
3	DF	BRA	Dirceu (to Ratchaburi Mitr Phol)
5	MF	BRA	João Paulo (to São Bento)
12	GK	BRA	Vagner (loan return to Palmeiras)
18	MF	BRA	Moisés (loan return to Grêmio)

=== Oeste ===
In: Note: Flags indicate national team as defined under FIFA eligibility rules; some limited exceptions apply. Players may hold more than one non-FIFA nationality.

No.	Pos.	Nation	Player
8	MF	BRA	Marciel (re-loan from Corinthians)

Out: Note: Flags indicate national team as defined under FIFA eligibility rules; some limited exceptions apply. Players may hold more than one non-FIFA nationality.

No.	Pos.	Nation	Player

=== Operário Ferroviário ===
In: Note: Flags indicate national team as defined under FIFA eligibility rules; some limited exceptions apply. Players may hold more than one non-FIFA nationality.

No.	Pos.	Nation	Player

Out: Note: Flags indicate national team as defined under FIFA eligibility rules; some limited exceptions apply. Players may hold more than one non-FIFA nationality.

No.	Pos.	Nation	Player

=== Paraná ===
In: Note: Flags indicate national team as defined under FIFA eligibility rules; some limited exceptions apply. Players may hold more than one non-FIFA nationality.

No.	Pos.	Nation	Player

Out: Note: Flags indicate national team as defined under FIFA eligibility rules; some limited exceptions apply. Players may hold more than one non-FIFA nationality.

No.	Pos.	Nation	Player
3	DF	BRA	Jesiel (loan return to Atlético Mineiro)
4	DF	BRA	Charles (to Ceará)
15	DF	BRA	Júnior (to CRB)
21	FW	BRA	Carlos (loan return to Atlético Mineiro)
—	DF	BRA	Cristovam (on loan to Ceará, previously on loan at (South Korea) Bucheon 1995)
—	FW	BRA	Vitor Feijão (to Ceará, previously on loan at Criciúma)

=== Ponte Preta ===
In: Note: Flags indicate national team as defined under FIFA eligibility rules; some limited exceptions apply. Players may hold more than one non-FIFA nationality.

No.	Pos.	Nation	Player
—	DF	BRA	Airton (from Avaí)
—	DF	BRA	Diego Renan (from Figueirense)
—	DF	BRA	Edson (from Fluminense, previously on loan at Bahia)
—	DF	BRA	Giovanni (from Fluminense, previously on loan at América Mineiro)
—	DF	BRA	Luis Ricardo (from Portuguesa)
—	MF	BRA	Gérson Magrão (from América Mineiro)
—	MF	BRA	Guilherme Mantuan (on loan from Corinthians)
—	MF	BRA	Igor Henrique (from Tombense)
—	FW	BRA	Dudu (from (Japan) Kashiwa Reysol)
—	FW	BRA	Hugo Cabral (from CSA)
—	FW	BRA	Marylson (from Joinville)

Out: Note: Flags indicate national team as defined under FIFA eligibility rules; some limited exceptions apply. Players may hold more than one non-FIFA nationality.

No.	Pos.	Nation	Player
12	GK	BRA	Vinícius Silvestre (loan return to Palmeiras)
19	FW	BRA	Vitinho (to CRB)

=== São Bento ===
In: Note: Flags indicate national team as defined under FIFA eligibility rules; some limited exceptions apply. Players may hold more than one non-FIFA nationality.

No.	Pos.	Nation	Player
—	GK	BRA	Renan (from Ceará)
—	DF	BRA	Guilherme Romão (on loan from Corinthians)
—	DF	BRA	Wesley (from (Philippines) Davao Aguilas)
—	MF	BRA	João Paulo (from Londrina)
—	FW	BRA	Henan (to Figueirense)

Out: Note: Flags indicate national team as defined under FIFA eligibility rules; some limited exceptions apply. Players may hold more than one non-FIFA nationality.

No.	Pos.	Nation	Player
—	FW	BRA	Danillo Bala (on loan to CRB, previously on loan at Campinense)

=== Sport Recife ===
In: Note: Flags indicate national team as defined under FIFA eligibility rules; some limited exceptions apply. Players may hold more than one non-FIFA nationality.

No.	Pos.	Nation	Player

Out: Note: Flags indicate national team as defined under FIFA eligibility rules; some limited exceptions apply. Players may hold more than one non-FIFA nationality.

No.	Pos.	Nation	Player
22	MF	BRA	Mateus Gonçalves (loan return to (Mexico) Tijuana)
—	DF	BRA	Samuel Xavier (to Ceará, previously on loan)
—	MF	COL	Reinaldo Lenis (on loan to (Argentina) Newell's Old Boys, previously on loan at (Colombia) Atlético Nacional)
—	FW	BRA	André (to Grêmio, previously on loan)

=== Vila Nova ===
In: Note: Flags indicate national team as defined under FIFA eligibility rules; some limited exceptions apply. Players may hold more than one non-FIFA nationality.

No.	Pos.	Nation	Player
—	GK	BRA	Cleriston (from Iporá)
—	GK	BRA	Saulo (on loan from Botafogo)
—	DF	BRA	Tiago Cametá (from Brasil de Pelotas)
—	DF	BRA	Capixaba (on loan from Atlético Mineiro, previously on loan at Chapecoense)
—	DF	BRA	Patrick (on loan from Ceará)
—	DF	BRA	Felipe Rodrigues (from Diadema)
—	MF	BRA	Danilo (from Corinthians)
—	MF	BRA	Denner (from Tombense)
—	FW	BRA	Michel (on loan from (Portugal) Aves)

Out: Note: Flags indicate national team as defined under FIFA eligibility rules; some limited exceptions apply. Players may hold more than one non-FIFA nationality.

No.	Pos.	Nation	Player
11	MF	BRA	Juninho (loan return to Palmeiras)
15	MF	BRA	Dener (to (Japan) Fagiano Okayama)
16	MF	BRA	Reis (to Criciúma)

=== Vitória ===
In: Note: Flags indicate national team as defined under FIFA eligibility rules; some limited exceptions apply. Players may hold more than one non-FIFA nationality.

No.	Pos.	Nation	Player
—	DF	BRA	Thales (on loan from Internacional)
—	MF	BRA	Ruy (on loan from Coritiba, previously on loan at América Mineiro)
—	MF	BRA	Wesley (on loan from (Portugal) Estoril)
—	FW	BRA	Andrigo (on loan from Internacional)

Out: Note: Flags indicate national team as defined under FIFA eligibility rules; some limited exceptions apply. Players may hold more than one non-FIFA nationality.

No.	Pos.	Nation	Player
10	FW	BRA	Neílton (to Internacional)
14	DF	BRA	Lucas Ribeiro (to (Germany) TSG 1899 Hoffenheim)
33	DF	BRA	Aderlan Santos (loan return to (Spain) Valencia)
—	MF	BRA	Lucas Marques (to (Portugal) Santa Clara, previously on loan at Figueirense)
