= 2019 SE Palmeiras season =

Palmeiras
2019 season
- President: Maurício Galiotte
- Coach: Felipão (Until September 2); Mano Menezes (September 3 – December 1); Andrey Lopes (interim)
- Stadium: Allianz Parque
- Série A: 3rd
- Campeonato Paulista: Semi-final
- Copa Libertadores: Quarter-final
- Copa do Brasil: Quarter-final
- Top goalscorer: League: Bruno Henrique (10 goals); All: Gustavo Scarpa; Dudu (13 each)
- Highest home attendance: 39,751 (vs. São Paulo – April 7)
- Lowest home attendance: 6,779 (vs. Goiás – December 5)
- Average home league attendance: 27,995
Home colors	Away colors	Third colors

The 2019 season was the 105th in Sociedade Esportiva Palmeiras existence. This season Palmeiras participated in the Campeonato Paulista, Copa Libertadores, Copa do Brasil and the Série A.

== Squad information ==
Squad at the end of the season.

Note: Flags indicate national team as defined under FIFA eligibility rules; some limited exceptions apply. Players may hold more than one non-FIFA nationality.

No.	Pos.	Nation	Player
1	GK	BRA	Fernando Prass (vice-captain)
2	DF	BRA	Marcos Rocha
3	DF	BRA	Edu Dracena
4	DF	BRA	Vitor Hugo
5	MF	BRA	Thiago Santos
6	DF	BRA	Diogo Barbosa
7	FW	BRA	Dudu
8	MF	BRA	Zé Rafael
9	FW	COL	Miguel Borja
10	FW	BRA	Luiz Adriano
12	DF	BRA	Mayke
13	DF	BRA	Luan
14	MF	BRA	Gustavo Scarpa
15	DF	PAR	Gustavo Gómez
16	FW	BRA	Deyverson
17	MF	BRA	Jean

No.	Pos.	Nation	Player
18	MF	BRA	Ramires
19	MF	BRA	Bruno Henrique (captain)
20	MF	BRA	Lucas Lima
21	GK	BRA	Weverton
23	MF	BRA	Raphael Veiga
25	DF	BRA	Antônio Carlos
26	DF	BRA	Victor Luis
27	FW	BRA	Henrique (on loan from Henan Jianye)
28	MF	BRA	Hyoran
29	FW	BRA	Willian
30	MF	BRA	Felipe Melo
35	MF	BRA	Matheus Fernandes
37	FW	BRA	Carlos Eduardo
38	FW	COL	Iván Angulo
42	GK	BRA	Jailson
47	FW	BRA	Gabriel Veron

=== Transfers ===
==== Transfers in ====
Pos.	Player	Transferred from	Fee/notes	Date	Source
DF	(Brazil) Mayke	(Brazil) Cruzeiro	Sign. Player was on loan in the 2018 season.	November 28, 2018	
MF	(Brazil) Zé Rafael	(Brazil) Bahia	R$14,500,000	November 29, 2018	
FW	(Brazil) Arthur	(Brazil) Ceará	R$5,000,000	November 30, 2018	
MF	(Brazil) Matheus Fernandes	(Brazil) Botafogo	R$17,000,000	December 6, 2018	
FW	(Brazil) Carlos Eduardo	(Egypt) Pyramids FC	R$25,200,000	December 19, 2018	
FW	(Brazil) Felipe Pires	(Germany) Hoffenheim	Loan.	December 20, 2018	
MF	(Brazil) Raphael Veiga	(Brazil) Athletico Paranaense	Loan return.	January 3, 2019	
FW	(Brazil) Yan	(Brazil) Youth system	Sign.	January 3, 2019	
DF	(Brazil) Marcos Rocha	(Brazil) Atlético Mineiro	Sign. Player was on loan in the 2018 season.	January 10, 2019	
MF	(Brazil) Ricardo Goulart	(China) Guangzhou Evergrande	Loan.	January 15, 2019	
FW	(Brazil) Luan Silva	(Brazil) Vitória	Loan.	March 21, 2019	
FW	(Brazil) Yan	(Portugal) Estoril	Loan return.	June 30, 2019	
FW	(Colombia) Iván Angulo	(Colombia) Envigado	Sign.	June 3, 2019	
MF	(Brazil) Ramires	Free agent	Sign. Last played for (China) Jiangsu Suning	June 13, 2019	
DF	(Brazil) Vitor Hugo	(Italy) Fiorentina	R$25,500,000	July 29, 2019	
FW	(Brazil) Luiz Adriano	(Russia) Spartak Moscow	R$4,600,000	July 30, 2019	
FW	(Brazil) Henrique	(China) Henan Jianye	Loan.	July 30, 2019	
FW	(Brazil) Gabriel Veron	(Brazil) Palmeiras Academy	Sign.	November 26, 2019	

==== Transfers out ====
Pos.	Player	Transferred to	Fee/notes	Date	Source
FW	(Brazil) Artur	(Brazil) Bahia	Loan.	January 4, 2019	
MF	(Brazil) Vitinho	(Brazil) São Caetano	Loan.	January 17, 2019	
DF	(Argentina) Nicolás Freire		Released.	January 17, 2019	
DF	(Brazil) Pedrão	(Brazil) América Mineiro	Loan.	January 22, 2019	
DF	(Brazil) Leandro Almeida	(Brazil) Paraná	Free transfer	January 22, 2019	
FW	(Brazil) Yan	(Portugal) Estoril	Loan.	January 31, 2019	
FW	(Brazil) Rafael Papagaio	(Brazil) Atlético Mineiro	Loan.	February 13, 2019	
DF	(Brazil) Luan Cândido	(Germany) RB Leipzig	R$39,000,000	March 15, 2019	
MF	(Brazil) Ricardo Goulart	(China) Guangzhou Evergrande	Loan return.	May 23, 2019	
FW	(Brazil) Yan	(Brazil) Sport	Loan.	June 11, 2019	
DF	(Brazil) Juninho	(Brazil) Bahia	Loan.	July 3, 2019	
MF	(Venezuela) Alejandro Guerra	(Brazil) Bahia	Loan.	July 4, 2019	
DF	(Brazil) Nathan	(Switzerland) FC Zürich	Free transfer	July 4, 2019	
FW	(Brazil) Felipe Pires	(Brazil) Fortaleza	Loan.	July 21, 2019	
MF	(Brazil) Moisés	(China) Shandong Luneng	R$23,000,000	July 21, 2019	
FW	(Brazil) Erik	(Japan) Yokohama Marinos	Loan.	July 26, 2019	
DF	(Brazil) Fabiano	(Portugal) Boavista	Loan.	August 18, 2019	
MF	(Brazil) Vitinho	(Brazil) Red Bull Bragantino	Loan.	August 20, 2019	
FW	(Brazil) Arthur Cabral	(Switzerland) Basel	Loan.	August 27, 2019	
DF	(Brazil) Vitão	(Ukraine) Shakhtar Donetsk	R$21,000,000	September 2, 2019	

=== Transfer summary ===
Undisclosed fees are not included in the transfer totals.

Expenditure

Total: ▼ R$91,800,000

Income

Total: ▲ R$83,000,000

Net totals

Total: ▼ R$8,800,000

== Competitions ==
=== Overview ===
Competition	First match	Last match	Starting round	Final position	Record							
Competition	First match	Last match	Starting round	Final position	Pld	W	D	L	GF	GA	GD	Win %
Série A	28 April 2019	8 December 2019	Matchday 1	Third place	38	21	11	6	61	32	+29	55.26
Copa do Brasil	22 May 2019	17 July 2019	Round of 16	Quarter-Finals	4	3	0	1	4	1	+3	75.00
Campeonato Paulista	20 January 2019	7 April 2019	Matchday 1	Semi-Finals	16	8	7	1	19	6	+13	50.00
Copa Libertadores	6 March 2019	27 August 2019	Group stage	Quarter-Finals	10	7	1	2	21	5	+16	70.00
Total					68	39	19	10	105	44	+61	57.35

Source: Competitions

=== Friendlies ===
January 12	Palmeiras	1–0	Comercial	São Paulo
9:30 UTC−2	Borja	Report		Stadium: Academia de Futebol

July 3	Guarani	2–1	Palmeiras	Campinas
19:00 UTC−3	Armero (yellow card) 52'; Diego Cardoso 60' (pen.); Bady 84'; Bruno Silva (yellow card) 90+3'	Report	Edu Dracena 9'; Diogo Barbosa (yellow card) 35'	Stadium: Brinco de Ouro; Attendance: 5,260

=== Campeonato Paulista ===
==== First stage ====
Palmeiras was drawn on the Group B.

Pos	Team	Pld	W	D	L	GF	GA	GD	Pts	Qualification or relegation
1	Palmeiras	12	7	4	1	13	5	+8	25	Knockout stage
2	Novorizontino	12	5	5	2	10	9	+1	20	Knockout stage
3	Guarani	12	4	2	6	13	18	−5	14	
4	São Bento (R)	12	1	4	7	8	18	−10	7	Relegation to Série A2

Source: Soccerway
(R) Relegated

January 20 1	Red Bull Brasil	1–1	Palmeiras	Campinas
19:00 UTC−2	Jobson 34'; Osman (yellow card) 48'; Aderlan (yellow card) 90+2'	Report	Borja 13'; Luan (yellow card) 57'	Stadium: Estádio Moisés Lucarelli; Attendance: 10,389; Referee: Luiz Flávio de Oliveira

January 23 2	Palmeiras	1–0	Botafogo-SP	São Paulo
21:00 UTC−2	Deyverson 20'; Marcos Rocha (yellow card) 85'	Report	Willian Oliveira (yellow card) 18'	Stadium: Allianz Parque; Attendance: 23,752; Referee: Flávio Rodrigues de Souza

January 27 3	São Caetano	0–2	Palmeiras	São Caetano do Sul
19:00 UTC−2	Marquinhos (yellow card) 5'; Bruno Mezenga (yellow card) 82'	Report	Borja 13'; Mayke (yellow card) 33'; Moisés (yellow card) 41'; Luan 61', (yellow card) 71'	Stadium: Estádio Anacleto Campanella; Attendance: 7,584; Referee: Vinicius Gonçalves Dias Araújo

January 30 4	Oeste	0–1	Palmeiras	Barueri
21:00 UTC−2	Kanu (yellow card) 51'; Alyson (yellow card) 55'; Cicinho (yellow card) 85'; Matheus Jesus (yellow card) 88'	Report	Felipe Pires 45'; Raphael Veiga (yellow card) 54'; Thiago Santos (yellow card) 68'	Stadium: Arena Barueri; Attendance: 9,229; Referee: Salim Fende Chavez

February 2 5	Palmeiras	0–1	Corinthians	São Paulo
17:00 UTC−2	Felipe Melo (yellow card) 39'; Bruno Henrique (yellow card) 40'; Mayke (yellow card) 86'; Deyverson (red card) 87'	Report	Danilo Avelar 7', (yellow card) 83'; Jádson (yellow card) 24'; Fagner (yellow card) 32'; Henrique (yellow card) 87'	Stadium: Allianz Parque; Attendance: 38,550; Referee: Luiz Flávio de Oliveira

February 11 6	Palmeiras	2–0	Bragantino	São Paulo
20:00 UTC−2	Dudu 7'; Gustavo Scarpa 28' (pen.); Antônio Carlos (yellow card) 59'	Report	Itaqui (yellow card) 37'; Lázaro (yellow card) 41'; Magno (yellow card) 54'; Klauber (yellow card) 66'	Stadium: Pacaembu; Attendance: 20,144; Referee: Vinicius Furlan

February 17 7	Ferroviária	0–0	Palmeiras	Araraquara
17:00 UTC−3	Anderson Uchoa (yellow card) 50'	Report		Stadium: Estádio Fonte Luminosa; Attendance: 10,374; Referee: Douglas Marques das Flores

February 23 8	Palmeiras	0–0	Santos	São Paulo
19:00 UTC−3	Weverton (yellow card) 31'; Antônio Carlos (yellow card) 38'	Report	Jean Lucas (yellow card) 36'; Yuri (yellow card) 44'; Cueva (yellow card) 62'	Stadium: Allianz Parque; Attendance: 33,980; Referee: Flávio Rodrigues de Souza

February 27 9	Palmeiras	3–2	Ituano	São Paulo
21:30 UTC−3	Ricardo Goulart 11', 22'; Borja (yellow card) 25', (goal) 57'; Thiago Santos (yellow card) 77'; Diogo Barbosa (yellow card) 87'; Felipe Melo (yellow card) 90'	Report	Baralhas (yellow card) 6'; Marcos Serrato 54'; Morato 74'	Stadium: Allianz Parque; Attendance: 20,660; Referee: Lucas Canetto Bellote

March 9 10	Mirassol	1–1	Palmeiras	Mirassol
16:30 UTC−3	Zé Roberto (yellow card) 38' (yellow-red card) 53'; Léo Baiano (yellow card) 43'; Carlão 54'	Report	Gómez 50' (pen.); Diogo Barbosa (yellow card) 57'	Stadium: José Maria de Campos Maia; Attendance: 9,689; Referee: Vinicius Gonçalves Dias Araújo

March 16 11	São Paulo	0–1	Palmeiras	São Paulo
16:30 UTC−3	Pablo (yellow card) 29'; Anderson Martins (yellow card) 70'	Report	Moisés (yellow card) 14'; Gómez (yellow card) 35'; Antônio Carlos (yellow card) 39'; Borja (yellow card) 44'; Carlos Eduardo 79', (yellow card) 89'	Stadium: Pacaembu; Attendance: 17,755; Referee: Thiago Duarte Peixoto

March 20 12	Palmeiras	1–0	Ponte Preta	São Paulo
21:30 UTC−3	Jean (yellow card) 6'; Felipe Pires (yellow card) 34'; Raphael Veiga 81'	Report	Nathan (yellow card) 45'; Diego Renan (yellow card) 60'	Stadium: Allianz Parque; Attendance: 23,019; Referee: Márcio Henrique de Gois

==== Quarterfinal ====
March 23 First leg	Novorizontino	1–1	Palmeiras	Novo Horizonte
17:00 UTC−3	Danielzinho (yellow card) 28'; Cléo Silva 38'	Report	Arthur 66'	Stadium: Doutor Jorge Ismael de Biasi; Attendance: 4,925; Referee: Raphael Claus

March 26 Second leg	Palmeiras	5–0 (6–1 agg.)	Novorizontino	São Paulo
21:00 UTC−3	Felipe Melo 5'; Ricardo Goulart 9'; Gustavo Scarpa 51' (pen.), 76'; Dudu 60' (pen.)	Report	Cléo Silva (yellow card) 37'; Dudu Vieira (yellow card) 79'	Stadium: Pacaembu; Attendance: 24,861; Referee: Vinicius Gonçalves Dias Araújo

==== Semifinal ====
March 30 First leg	São Paulo	0–0	Palmeiras	São Paulo
18:00 UTC−3	Liziero (yellow card) 24'; Luan (yellow card) 43'; Arboleda (yellow card) 57'; Hudson (yellow card) 88'	Report	Felipe Melo (yellow card) 16'; Victor Luis (yellow card) 47'; Marcos Rocha (yellow card) 56'; Gustavo Scarpa (yellow card) 87'	Stadium: Morumbi; Attendance: 43,202; Referee: Vinicius Furlan

April 7 Second leg	Palmeiras	0–0 (0–0 agg.) (4–5 p)	São Paulo	São Paulo
16:00 UTC−3	Gómez (yellow card) 18'; Deyverson (yellow card) 90+5'	Report	Hudson (yellow card) 18'; Reinaldo (yellow card) 47'; Éverton (yellow card) 57'	Stadium: Allianz Parque; Attendance: 39,751; Referee: Flávio Rodrigues de Souza
	Penalties
	Bruno Henrique (penalty scored); Gómez (penalty scored); Ricardo Goulart (penalty missed); Luan (penalty scored); Diogo Barbosa (penalty scored); Zé Rafael (penalty missed)		Nenê (penalty scored); Everton Felipe (penalty scored); Hudson (penalty scored); Carneiro (penalty scored); Volpi (penalty missed); Bruno Alves (penalty scored)

=== Copa Libertadores ===
==== Group stage ====
The draw for the qualifying stages and group stage was held on 17 December 2018 at the CONMEBOL Convention Centre in Luque, Paraguay. Palmeiras was drawn on the group F.

Pos	Team	Pld	W	D	L	GF	GA	GD	Pts	Qualification
1	(Brazil) Palmeiras	6	5	0	1	13	1	+12	15	Round of 16
2	(Argentina) San Lorenzo	6	3	1	2	4	2	+2	10	Round of 16
3	(Peru) Melgar	6	2	1	3	2	9	−7	7	Copa Sudamericana
4	(Colombia) Junior	6	1	0	5	1	8	−7	3	

Source: CONMEBOL
Rules for classification: Group stage tiebreakers

March 6 1	Junior (Colombia)	0–2	(Brazil) Palmeiras	Barranquilla, Colombia
21:30 UTC−3	Gutiérrez (yellow card) 44' (yellow-red card) 75'	Report	Gustavo Scarpa 10'; Marcos Rocha 90+1'	Stadium: Estadio Metropolitano Roberto Meléndez; Referee: Daniel Fedorczuk (Uruguay)

March 12 2	Palmeiras (Brazil)	3–0	(Peru) Melgar	São Paulo, Brazil
19:15 UTC−3	Felipe Melo 24', (yellow card) 30'; Ricardo Goulart 53', (yellow card) 64'; Deyverson 70'; Thiago Santos (yellow card) 90'	Report	Freitas (yellow card) 17'; Fuentes (yellow card) 52'	Stadium: Allianz Parque; Attendance: 30,023; Referee: Mario Díaz de Vivar (Paraguay)

April 2 3	San Lorenzo (Argentina)	1–0	(Brazil) Palmeiras	Buenos Aires, Argentina
19:15 UTC−3	Castellani (yellow card) 45'; Herrera 50', (yellow card) 51'	Report	Thiago Santos (yellow card) 32'; Bruno Henrique (yellow card) 40'; Marcos Rocha (yellow card) 45+1'; Deyverson (yellow card) 86'	Stadium: Estadio Pedro Bidegain; Referee: Julio Bascuñán (Chile)

April 10 4	Palmeiras (Brazil)	3–0	(Colombia) Junior	São Paulo, Brazil
21:30 UTC−3	Deyverson 19'; Luan (yellow card) 24'; Bruno Henrique (yellow card) 32'; Dudu 54'; Hyoran 88'	Report	Pérez (yellow card) 18'; Díaz (yellow card) 40'	Stadium: Allianz Parque; Attendance: 28,791; Referee: Roberto Tobar (Chile)

April 25 5	Melgar (Peru)	0–4	(Brazil) Palmeiras	Arequipa, Peru
23:00 UTC−3	Cuesta (yellow card) 13'; Neyra (yellow card) 29' (yellow-red card) 90+1'; Ramos (yellow card) 36'; Fuentes (yellow card) 56'	Report	Gómez 8'; Scarpa 21', 67'; Zé Rafael (yellow card) 28'; Deyverson (yellow card) 61'; Moisés 80'	Stadium: Monumental de la UNSA; Referee: Carlos Orbe (Ecuador)

May 8 6	Palmeiras (Brazil)	1–0	(Argentina) San Lorenzo	São Paulo, Brazil
21:30 UTC−3	Mayke (yellow card) 63'; Gustavo Scarpa 69'; Felipe Melo (yellow card) 83'; Luan (yellow card) 90+3'	Report	Martínez (yellow card) 90'	Stadium: Allianz Parque; Attendance: 29,204; Referee: Gery Vargas (Bolivia)

==== Round of 16 ====
The draw for the round of 16 was held on 13 May 2019.

July 23 First leg	Godoy Cruz (Argentina)	2–2	(Brazil) Palmeiras	Mendoza, Argentina
21:30 UTC−3	García 5', 28'; Aleo (yellow card) 32'; Brunetta (yellow card) 50'	Report	Felipe Melo 33'; Luan (yellow card) 40'; Borja 58'	Stadium: Estadio Malvinas Argentinas; Referee: Wilmar Roldán (Colombia)

July 30 Second leg	Palmeiras (Brazil)	4–0 (6–2 agg.)	(Argentina) Godoy Cruz	São Paulo, Brazil
21:30 UTC−3	Bruno Henrique (yellow card) 33'; Raphael Veiga 56' (pen.), (yellow card) 58'; Borja 74'; Gustavo Scarpa 83'; Dudu 90+3'	Report	Cardona (yellow card) 14'; Varela (yellow card) 56'; Merentiel (yellow card) 77'; Manzur (red card) 87'	Stadium: Allianz Parque; Attendance: 35,666; Referee: Esteban Ostojich (Uruguay)

==== Quarterfinal ====
August 20 First leg	Grêmio (Brazil)	0–1	(Brazil) Palmeiras	Porto Alegre, Brazil
21:30 UTC−3	Kannemann (yellow card) 17'	Report	Felipe Melo (yellow card) 8' (yellow-red card) 77'; Gustavo Scarpa 30'; Thiago Santos (yellow card) 80'	Stadium: Arena do Grêmio; Referee: Patricio Loustau (Argentina)

August 27 Second leg	Palmeiras (Brazil)	1–2 (2–a2 agg.)	(Brazil) Grêmio	São Paulo, Brazil
21:30 UTC−3	Luiz Adriano 13'; Marcos Rocha (yellow card) 88'	Report	Maicon (yellow card) 15'; Everton 17'; Alisson 21', (yellow card) 77'; Matheus Henrique (yellow card) 28'; Jean Pyerre (yellow card) 47'; Geromel (yellow card) 90+3'	Stadium: Pacaembu; Attendance: 34,541; Referee: Néstor Pitana (Argentina)

=== Série A ===
==== Standings ====
Pos	Team	Pld	W	D	L	GF	GA	GD	Pts	Qualification or relegation
1	Flamengo (C)	38	28	6	4	86	37	+49	90	Qualification for Copa Libertadores group stage (Note: Flamengo qualified for the Copa Libertadores group stage by winning the 2019 Copa Libertadores. Athletico Paranaense qualified for the Copa Libertadores group stage by winning the 2019 Copa do Brasil.)
2	Santos	38	22	8	8	60	33	+27	74	Qualification for Copa Libertadores group stage
3	Palmeiras	38	21	11	6	61	32	+29	74	Qualification for Copa Libertadores group stage
4	Grêmio	38	19	8	11	64	39	+25	65	Qualification for Copa Libertadores group stage
5	Athletico Paranaense	38	18	10	10	51	32	+19	64	Qualification for Copa Libertadores group stage

Source: CBF
Rules for classification: 1) points; 2) wins; 3) goal difference; 4) goals scored; 5) head-to-head results; 6) least red cards received; 7) least yellow cards received; 8) draw.
(C) Champions

==== Result by round ====
Round	1	2	3	4	5	6	7	8	9	10	11	12	13	14	15	16	17	18	19	20	21	22	23	24	25	26	27	28	29	30	31	32	33	34	35	36	37	38
Result	W	D	W	W	W	W	W	W	W	D	L	D	D	D	D	W	L	W	W	W	W	D	D	L	W	W	D	W	W	W	W	D	D	L	L	L	W	W
Position	1	4	2	1	1	1	1	1	1	1	1	2	2	2	3	3	5	3	2	2	2	2	2	3	2	2	2	2	2	2	2	2	2	3	3	3	3	3

Updated to match(es) played on December 8, 2019. Source: CBF
A = Away; H = Home; W = Win; D = Draw; L = Loss

==== Matches ====
The schedule was released on February 22, 2019.

April 28 1	Palmeiras	4–0	Fortaleza	São Paulo
19:00 UTC−3	Zé Rafael 16', 70'; Deyverson (yellow card) 45'; Marcos Rocha 58'; Bruno Henrique 90'	Report	Carlinhos (yellow card) 43'; Osvaldo (yellow card) 45'	Stadium: Allianz Parque; Attendance: 26,701; Referee: Bráulio da Silva Machado (Santa Catarina)

May 1 2	CSA	1–1	Palmeiras	Maceió
16:00 UTC−3	Matheus Sávio 62'	Report	Raphael Veiga 8'	Stadium: Rei Pelé; Attendance: 15,735; Referee: Caio Max Augusto Vieira (Rio Grande do Norte)

May 4 3	Palmeiras	1–0	Internacional	São Paulo
19:00 UTC−3	Deyverson 13'; Felipe Melo (yellow card) 17'; Marcos Rocha (yellow card) 71'	Report	Cuesta (yellow card) 12'; Sarrafiore (yellow card) 12'; Guerrero (yellow card) 17'; Edenílson (yellow card) 76'; Zeca (yellow card) 90+2'	Stadium: Allianz Parque; Attendance: 31,549; Referee: Wagner do Nascimento Magalhães (Rio de Janeiro)

May 12 4	Atlético Mineiro	0–2	Palmeiras	Belo Horizonte
16:00 UTC−3	Nathan (yellow card) 45'	Report	Raphael Veiga (yellow card) 35'; Diogo Barbosa (yellow card) 41'; Bruno Henrique 43', 52'; Felipe Melo (yellow card) 73'	Stadium: Mineirão; Attendance: 24,368; Referee: Anderson Daronco (Rio Grande do Sul)

May 18 5	Palmeiras	4–0	Santos	São Paulo
19:00 UTC−3	Gómez 5'; Deyverson 18'; Dudu (yellow card) 37'; Raphael Veiga 51'; Felipe Melo (yellow card) 83'; Hyoran 87'	Report	González (yellow card) 36'; Gustavo Henrique (yellow card) 39'; Alison (yellow card) 69'; Victor Ferraz (yellow card) 77'	Stadium: Pacaembu; Attendance: 30,058; Referee: Rafael Traci (Santa Catarina)

May 25 6	Botafogo	0–1	Palmeiras	Brasília
16:00 UTC−3	João Paulo (yellow card) 36'; Gilson (yellow card) 38'; Valencia (yellow card) 40'; Bochecha (yellow card) 43'; Fernando (yellow card) 49'; Gabriel (yellow card) 58'; Fernández (yellow card) 58'; Cícero (yellow card) 60'; Diego Souza (yellow card) 62'; Ferrareis (yellow card) 68'	Report	Gómez 61' (pen.)	Stadium: Mané Garrincha; Attendance: 33,143; Referee: Paulo Roberto Alves Júnior (Paraná)

June 2 7	Chapecoense	1–2	Palmeiras	Chapecó
19:00 UTC−3	Everaldo 36' (pen.); Douglas (yellow card) 55'; Elicarlos (yellow card) 61'	Report	Antônio Carlos (yellow card) 15'; Felipe Melo (yellow card) 24'; Dudu 31'; Marcos Rocha 44'; Deyverson (yellow card) 57'; Zé Rafael (yellow card) 58'; Gómez (yellow card) 69'	Stadium: Arena Condá; Attendance: 10,615; Referee: Rodolpho Toski Marques (Paraná)

June 8 8	Palmeiras	1–0	Athletico Paranaense	São Paulo
16:30 UTC−3	Felipe Melo (yellow card) 11'; Raphael Veiga 79' (pen.); Zé Rafael (yellow card) 90+2'	Report	Léo Pereira (yellow card) 28'; Wellington (yellow card) 34'; Nikão (yellow card) 42'; Márcio Azevedo (yellow card) 77'	Stadium: Allianz Parque; Attendance: 37,086; Referee: Rodrigo D'Alonso Ferreira (Santa Catarina)

June 13 9	Palmeiras	2–0	Avaí	São Paulo
20:00 UTC−3	Lucas Lima (yellow card) 28'; Deyverson 34'; Bruno Henrique 65'	Report	Kunde (yellow card) 55'	Stadium: Allianz Parque; Attendance: 31,946; Referee: Marcelo de Lima Henrique (Rio de Janeiro)

July 13 10	São Paulo	1–1	Palmeiras	São Paulo
19:00 UTC−3	Pablo 9'; Arboleda (yellow card) 35'; Hudson (yellow card) 44'; Raniel (yellow card) 90+2'	Report	Moisés (yellow card) 22'; Antônio Carlos (yellow card) 43'; Carlos Eduardo (yellow card) 54'; Dudu 70'	Stadium: Morumbi; Attendance: 38,267; Referee: Bruno Arleu de Araújo (Rio de Janeiro)

July 20 11	Ceará	2–0	Palmeiras	Fortaleza
19:00 UTC−3	Luiz Otávio (yellow card) 3'; Mateus Gonçalves 31'; William Oliveira (yellow card) 57'; Leandro Carvalho 71'; Felippe Cardoso (yellow card) 74'	Report	Felipe Melo (yellow card) 45'; Gómez (yellow card) 74'	Stadium: Arena Castelão; Attendance: 31,556; Referee: Rodrigo D'Alonso Ferreira (Santa Catarina)

July 27 12	Palmeiras	1–1	Vasco	São Paulo
17:00 UTC−3	Gustavo Scarpa 14' (pen.); Thiago Santos (yellow card) 66'	Report	Marrony 2'; Leandro Castán (yellow card) 13'; Bruno César (yellow card) 28'; Henrique (yellow card) 86'; Marcos Júnior (yellow card) 90+1'	Stadium: Allianz Parque; Attendance: 37,754; Referee: Ricardo Marques (Minas Gerais)

August 4 13	Corinthians	1–1	Palmeiras	São Paulo
19:00 UTC−3	Manoel 12'; Gil (yellow card) 43'	Report	Gómez (yellow card) 11'; Diogo Barbosa (yellow card) 39'; Felipe Melo 47', (yellow card) 65'	Stadium: Arena Corinthians; Attendance: 42,675; Referee: Anderson Daronco (Rio Grande do Sul)

August 11 14	Palmeiras	2–2	Bahia	São Paulo
16:00 UTC−3	Dudu 12', 57', (yellow card) 51'; Marcos Rocha (yellow card) 39'; Zé Rafael (yellow card) 45+1'; Felipe Melo (red card) 45+3'; Gustavo Scarpa (yellow card) 45+7'; Diogo Barbosa (yellow card) 51'; Thiago Santos (yellow card) 90+3'	Report	Giovanni (yellow card) 44'; Lucca (yellow card) 45+6'; Gilberto 52' (pen.), 84' (pen.); Gregore (yellow card) 85' (yellow-red card) 86'; Wanderson (yellow card) 90+1'	Stadium: Allianz Parque; Attendance: 34,275; Referee: Igor Junio Benevenuto de Oliveira (Minas Gerais)

August 17 15	Grêmio	1–1	Palmeiras	Porto Alegre
21:00 UTC−3	David Braz 87'	Report	Dudu 13'	Stadium: Arena do Grêmio; Attendance: 12,897; Referee: Wagner do Nascimento Magalhães (Rio de Janeiro)

September 1 17	Flamengo	3–0	Palmeiras	Rio de Janeiro
16:00 UTC−3	Gabriel 10', 60' (pen.); Arrascaeta 37'; Rodrigo Caio (yellow card) 53'; Bruno Henrique (yellow card) 78'	Report	Willian (yellow card) 7'; Bruno Henrique (yellow card) 56'; Gómez (red card) 81'	Stadium: Maracanã; Attendance: 61,390; Referee: Rafael Traci (Santa Catarina)

September 7 18	Goiás	1–2	Palmeiras	Goiânia
21:00 UTC−3	Rafael Vaz 19'; Léo Sena (yellow card) 25'; Renatinho (yellow card) 27'; Alan Ruschel (yellow card) 41'; Gilberto (yellow card) 78'; Marcelo Hermes (yellow card) 90+8'	Report	Willian 81'; Lucas Lima (yellow card) 88' (yellow-red card) 90'; Gustavo Scarpa 90+10'	Stadium: Serra Dourada; Attendance: 17,115; Referee: Wagner Reway (Pernambuco)

September 10 16	Palmeiras	3–0	Fluminense	São Paulo
21:00 UTC−3	Luiz Adriano 8', 57', 62'	Report	Wellington Nem (yellow card) 31'; Airton (yellow card) 59'	Stadium: Allianz Parque; Attendance: 27,956; Referee: Anderson Daronco (Rio Grande do Sul)
Note: Match was originally to be played in August 25, but was delayed due to the Brazilian club's participation in the 2019 Copa Libertadores and the 2019 Copa Sudamericana.

September 14 19	Palmeiras	1–0	Cruzeiro	São Paulo
19:00 UTC−3	Bruno Henrique 45'; Felipe Melo (yellow card) 68'; Dudu (yellow card) 73'	Report	Marquinhos Gabriel (yellow card) 49'; Rafael Santos (yellow card) 53'; Éderson (yellow card) 86'	Stadium: Allianz Parque; Attendance: 35,578; Referee: Rodolpho Toski Marques (Paraná)

September 22 20	Fortaleza	0–1	Palmeiras	Fortaleza
16:00 UTC−3	Felipe Alves (yellow card) 81'; Felipe (yellow card) 85'; André Luis (yellow card) 85'; Carlinhos (yellow card) 88'	Report	Willian 47'; Marcos Rocha (yellow card) 77'	Stadium: Castelão; Attendance: 34,514; Referee: Marcelo de Lima Henrique (Rio de Janeiro)

September 26 21	Palmeiras	6–2	CSA	São Paulo
19:15 UTC−3	Luiz Adriano 5', 74'; Willian 10'; Bruno Henrique 28', 82'; Gómez 45+1'	Report	Apodi 51'; Jean Cléber (yellow card) 60'; Ricardo Bueno 87'	Stadium: Pacaembu; Attendance: 20,023; Referee: Diego Pombo Lopez (Bahia)

September 29 22	Internacional	1–1	Palmeiras	Porto Alegre
16:00 UTC−3	Patrick 27', (yellow card) 82'; Rafael Sóbis (yellow card) 74'; Cuesta (yellow card) 90+2'	Report	Willian 57'; Lucas Lima (yellow card) 75'; Borja (yellow card) 86'	Stadium: Beira-Rio; Attendance: 19,816; Referee: Bráulio da Silva Machado (Santa Catarina)

October 6 23	Palmeiras	1–1	Atlético Mineiro	São Paulo
16:00 UTC−3	Gómez (yellow card) 8'; Dudu (yellow card) 53', (goal) 82'; Deyverson (yellow card) 90+5'	Report	Luan (yellow card) 42'; Nathan 45+2'; Cleiton (yellow card) 58'; Di Santo (yellow card) 61'; Leonardo Silva (yellow card) 90+4'	Stadium: Allianz Parque; Attendance: 32,659; Referee: Rafael Traci (Santa Catarina)

October 9 24	Santos	2–0	Palmeiras	Santos
21:30 UTC−3	Gustavo Henrique 12'; Marinho 17'; Sánchez (yellow card) 75'	Report	Felipe Melo (yellow card) 63'; Carlos Eduardo (yellow card) 70'; Willian (red card) 72'	Stadium: Vila Belmiro; Attendance: 11,408; Referee: Flávio Rodrigues de Souza (São Paulo)

October 12 25	Palmeiras	1–0	Botafogo	São Paulo
21:00 UTC−3	Thiago Santos 14', (yellow card) 72'; Luan (yellow card) 36'	Report	Fernando (yellow card) 9'; Carli (yellow card) 40'	Stadium: Pacaembu; Attendance: 19,028; Referee: Anderson Daronco (Rio Grande do Sul)

October 16 26	Palmeiras	1–0	Chapecoense	São Paulo
21:00 UTC−3	Gómez (yellow card) 45+2'; Victor Luis (red card) 71'; Felipe Melo 90+9'	Report	Bruno Pacheco (yellow card) 54'; Gum (red card) 67'; Elicarlos (yellow card) 70'; Tiepo (yellow card) 90+6'	Stadium: Allianz Parque; Attendance: 22,738; Referee: Vinicius Gomes do Amaral (Rio Grande do Sul)
Note: Victor Luis and Tiepo were booked on the bench.

October 20 27	Athletico Paranaense	1–1	Palmeiras	Curitiba
19:00 UTC−3	Marcelo Cirino 6'; Thiago Heleno (yellow card) 68'	Report	Gómez (yellow card) 29'; Deyverson 40'; Bruno Henrique (yellow card) 70'	Stadium: Arena da Baixada; Attendance: 18,732; Referee: Ricardo Marques (Minas Gerais)

October 27 28	Avaí	1–2	Palmeiras	Florianópolis
18:00 UTC−3	Betão (yellow card) 40'; Jonathan (yellow card) 48'; João Paulo 78' (pen.); Ricardo (yellow card) 84'	Report	Felipe Melo (yellow card) 48'; Deyverson 53'; Weverton (yellow card) 77'; Gustavo Scarpa 85' (pen.)	Stadium: Ressacada; Attendance: 8,815; Referee: Wilton Sampaio (Goiás)

October 30 29	Palmeiras	3–0	São Paulo	São Paulo
19:30 UTC−3	Bruno Henrique 11'; Felipe Melo 41'; Gustavo Scarpa 56'	Report		Stadium: Allianz Parque; Attendance: 29,481; Referee: Raphael Claus (São Paulo)

November 2 30	Palmeiras	1–0	Ceará	São Paulo
19:00 UTC−3	Vitor Hugo (yellow card) 11'; Zé Rafael 16'; Weverton (yellow card) 88'	Report	Cristovam (yellow card) 44'; Brock (yellow card) 72'	Stadium: Allianz Parque; Attendance: 29,019; Referee: Felipe Fernandes de Lima (Minas Gerais)

November 6 31	Vasco	1–2	Palmeiras	Rio de Janeiro
21:30 UTC−3	Mayke 18' (o.g.); Henríquez (yellow card) 21'; Rossi (yellow card) 21'; Fellipe Bastos (yellow card) 33'; Marrony (yellow card) 45'; Bruno César (yellow card) 47'; Danilo Barcelos (yellow card) 81'; Leandro Castán (yellow card) 85' (red card) 85'	Report	Lucas Lima 11', (yellow card) 62'; Deyverson (yellow card) 39'; Matheus Fernandes (yellow card) 45+2'; Zé Rafael (yellow card) 52'; Luiz Adriano 76'	Stadium: São Januário; Attendance: 8,249; Referee: Rafael Traci (Santa Catarina)

November 9 32	Palmeiras	1–1	Corinthians	São Paulo
19:00 UTC−3	Marcos Rocha (yellow card) 66'; Thiago Santos (yellow card) 80'; Bruno Henrique 90+3'	Report	Gabriel (yellow card) 76'; Michel 90+1'	Stadium: Pacaembu; Attendance: 34,283; Referee: Vinicius Gonçalves Dias Araújo (São Paulo)

November 17 33	Bahia	1–1	Palmeiras	Salvador
16:00 UTC−3	Flávio (yellow card) 18'; Arthur Caíke 45+1'; Ronaldo (yellow card) 78'	Report	Borja 70'	Stadium: Arena Fonte Nova; Attendance: 23,194; Referee: Bruno Arleu de Araújo (Rio de Janeiro)

November 24 34	Palmeiras	1–2	Grêmio	São Paulo
16:00 UTC−3	Thiago Santos (yellow card) 49'; Dudu (yellow card) 76'; Bruno Henrique 82' (pen.)	Report	Matheus Henrique (yellow card) 44'; Everton 68' (pen.); Diego Tardelli (yellow card) 81'; Pepê (yellow card) 85', (goal) 90+3'	Stadium: Allianz Parque; Attendance: 22,767; Referee: Wilton Sampaio (Goiás)

November 28 35	Fluminense	1–0	Palmeiras	Rio de Janeiro
19:30 UTC−3	Marcos Paulo 37'; Digão (yellow card) 43'; Daniel (yellow card) 85'; Nino (yellow card) 90'	Report	Hyoran (yellow card) 41'; Victor Luis (yellow card) 64'; Willian (yellow card) 71'	Stadium: Maracanã; Attendance: 29,968; Referee: Leandro Vuaden (Rio Grande do Sul)

December 1 36	Palmeiras	1–3	Flamengo	São Paulo
16:00 UTC−3	Willian (yellow card) 81'; Matheus Fernandes 83'	Report	De Arrascaeta 4'; Rafinha (yellow card) 33'; Gabriel 45+1', 47'; Vitinho (yellow card) 54'	Stadium: Allianz Parque; Attendance: 22,219; Referee: Ricardo Marques (Minas Gerais)

December 5 37	Palmeiras	5–1	Goiás	Campinas
19:15 UTC−3	Zé Rafael 21', (yellow card) 53'; Diogo Barbosa (yellow card) 25'; Edu Dracena (yellow card) 29'; Dudu 33', 81'; Weverton (yellow card) 66'; Veron 69', 89'; Matheus Fernandes (yellow card) 76'	Report	Rafael Moura 26' (pen.); Rafinha (yellow card) 51'	Stadium: Brinco de Ouro; Attendance: 6,779; Referee: Bruno Arleu de Araújo (Rio de Janeiro)

December 8 38	Cruzeiro	0–2	Palmeiras	Belo Horizonte
16:00 UTC−3		Report	Zé Rafael (yellow card) 45', (goal) 56'; Dudu 82'	Stadium: Mineirão; Attendance: 24,035; Referee: Marcelo de Lima Henrique (Rio de Janeiro)

=== Copa do Brasil ===
==== Round of 16 ====
The draw was held on May 2, 2019.

May 22 First leg	Sampaio Corrêa (Maranhão)	0–1	(São Paulo (state)) Palmeiras	São Luís
19:15 UTC−3	Douglas Assis (yellow card) 90+4'	Report	Moisés 90+1'	Stadium: Castelão; Attendance: 22,680; Referee: Rodrigo D'Alonso Ferreira (Santa Catarina)

May 30 Second leg	Palmeiras (São Paulo (state))	2–0 (3–0 agg.)	(Maranhão) Sampaio Corrêa	São Paulo
20:00 UTC−3	Mayke 38'; Lucas Lima (yellow card) 40'; Felipe Melo (yellow card) 45+3'; Zé Rafael 48'; Dudu (yellow card) 73'; Antônio Carlos (yellow card) 83'	Report	Moisés (yellow card) 21'; João Paulo (yellow card) 21'; Esquerdinha (yellow card) 41'; Felipe Dias (yellow card) 71'	Stadium: Allianz Parque; Attendance: 26,880; Referee: Jean Pierre Gonçalves Lima (Rio Grande do Sul)

==== Quarterfinal ====
The draw was held on June 10, 2019.

July 10 First leg	Palmeiras (São Paulo (state))	1–0	(Rio Grande do Sul) Internacional	São Paulo
21:30 UTC−3	Zé Rafael 19'; Felipe Melo (yellow card) 27'; Luan (yellow card) 84'	Report	Cuesta (yellow card) 45+3'; Rafael Sóbis (yellow card) 76'; Rodrigo Moledo (yellow card) 86'	Stadium: Allianz Parque; Attendance: 36,443; Referee: Wilton Sampaio (Goiás)

July 17 Second leg	Internacional (Rio Grande do Sul)	1–0 (1–1 agg.) (5–4 p)	(São Paulo (state)) Palmeiras	Porto Alegre
21:30 UTC−3	Patrick 40'; López (yellow card) 54'; D'Alessandro (yellow card) 56' (yellow-red card) 90+4'; Wellington Silva (yellow card) 90+9'	Report	Dudu (yellow card) 53'; Luan (yellow card) 69'; Gómez (yellow card) 70'; Marcos Rocha (yellow card) 85'	Stadium: Estádio Beira-Rio; Attendance: 40,229; Referee: Rafael Traci (Santa Catarina)
	Penalties
	Guerrero (penalty scored); Rafael Sóbis (penalty scored); Edenílson (penalty scored); Rodrigo Lindoso (penalty scored); Patrick (penalty missed); Nonato (penalty scored)		Bruno Henrique (penalty scored); Gómez (penalty missed); Diogo Barbosa (penalty scored); Luan (penalty scored); Willian (penalty scored); Moisés (penalty missed)

== Statistics ==
=== Overall statistics ===
Games played	68 (16 Campeonato Paulista, 10 Copa Libertadores, 38 Série A, 4 Copa do Brasil)
Games won	39 (8 Campeonato Paulista, 7 Copa Libertadores, 21 Série A, 3 Copa do Brasil)
Games drawn	19 (7 Campeonato Paulista, 1 Copa Libertadores, 11 Série A, 0 Copa do Brasil)
Games lost	10 (1 Campeonato Paulista, 2 Copa Libertadores, 6 Série A, 1 Copa do Brasil)
Goals scored	105
Goals conceded	44
Goal difference	+61 (+13 Campeonato Paulista, +16 Copa Libertadores, +29 Série A, +3 Copa do Brasil)
Clean sheets	37
Most clean sheets	Weverton (25)
Best result	5–0 (vs. Novorizontino, Campeonato Paulista – March 26)
Worst result	0–3 (vs. Flamengo, Série A – September 1)
Yellow cards	134
Red cards	7
Top scorer	Gustavo Scarpa and Dudu (13 goals each)

=== Goalscorers ===
In italic players who left the team in mid-season.

Place	Position	Nationality	Number	Name	Campeonato Paulista	Copa Libertadores	Série A	Copa do Brasil	Total
1	MF	(Brazil)	14	Gustavo Scarpa	3	6	4	0	13
1	FW	(Brazil)	7	Dudu	2	2	9	0	13
2	MF	(Brazil)	19	Bruno Henrique	0	0	10	0	10
3	FW	(Brazil)	16	Deyverson	1	2	5	0	8
4	FW	(Brazil)	10	Luiz Adriano	0	1	6	0	7
4	MF	(Brazil)	8	Zé Rafael	0	0	5	2	7
5	MF	(Brazil)	30	Felipe Melo	1	2	3	0	6
5	FW	(Colombia)	9	M. Borja	3	2	1	0	6
6	MF	(Brazil)	23	Raphael Veiga	1	1	3	0	5
6	DF	(Paraguay)	15	G. Gómez	1	1	3	0	5
7	MF	(Brazil)	11	Ricardo Goulart	3	1	0	0	4
7	FW	(Brazil)	29	Willian	0	0	4	0	4
8	DF	(Brazil)	2	Marcos Rocha	0	1	2	0	3
9	MF	(Brazil)	10	Moisés	0	1	0	1	2
9	MF	(Brazil)	28	Hyoran	0	1	1	0	2
9	FW	(Brazil)	47	Veron	0	0	2	0	2
10	DF	(Brazil)	13	Luan	1	0	0	0	1
10	FW	(Brazil)	27	Felipe Pires	1	0	0	0	1
10	FW	(Brazil)	37	Carlos Eduardo	1	0	0	0	1
10	FW	(Brazil)	39	Arthur	1	0	0	0	1
10	DF	(Brazil)	12	Mayke	0	0	0	1	1
10	MF	(Brazil)	5	Thiago Santos	0	0	1	0	1
10	MF	(Brazil)	20	Lucas Lima	0	0	1	0	1
10	MF	(Brazil)	35	Matheus Fernandes	0	0	1	0	1
