= Novo Horizonte =

Novo Horizonte (Portuguese, 'new horizon') may refer to the following places in Brazil:

- Novo Horizonte, Bahia
- Novo Horizonte, Santa Catarina
- Novo Horizonte, São Paulo
- Novo Horizonte, Ataléia, Minas Gerais

== See also ==
- Novorizonte
