= Novo Horizonte, Santa Catarina =

Municipality of Santa Catarina, Brazil

Coordinates: 26°26′38″S 52°50′02″W

- Municipality
- Flag Coat of arms
- Interactive map of Novo Horizonte, Santa Catarina
- Country: Brazil
- Time zone: UTC−3 (BRT)

Novo Horizonte (portuguese for "New Horizon") is a Brazilian municipality in the west of the state of Santa Catarina. It is situated on a latitude of 26° 26' 40" South, and a longitude of 52° 50' 01" East, at an altitude of 710 metres. It was created in 1992 out of the existing municipality of São Lourenço do Oeste. The population was estimated at 2,404 inhabitants in 2020. The municipality covers 151 km^{2}.

== Neighbouring towns ==
Novo Horizonte is bordered by the following municipalities:

- São Lourenço do Oeste
- Jupiá
- Galvão
- Coronel Martins
- Santiago do Sul
- Formosa do Sul
