= Tiepo =

Brazilian footballer

Personal information
- Full name: Giovanni Silva Tiepo
- Date of birth: 8 February 1998 (age 28)
- Place of birth: São Domingos, Brazil
- Height: 1.84 m (6 ft 0 in)
- Position: Goalkeeper

Team information
- Current team: Floresta
- Number: 22

Youth career
- 2008–2012: Internacional
- 2012–2018: Chapecoense

Senior career*
Years	Team	Apps	(Gls)
2017–2023	Chapecoense	35	(0)
2024–2025	Cianorte	26	(0)
2025	Chapecoense	0	(0)
2026–	Floresta	6	(0)
- * Club domestic league appearances and goals as of 9 November 2026

Giovanni Silva Tiepo (born 8 February 1998), commonly known as Tiepo, is a Brazilian footballer who plays as a goalkeeper for Floresta.

== Career ==
=== Early career ===
Born in São Domingos, Santa Catarina, Tiepo joined Chapecoense's youth setup in 2012, after being released from Internacional.

=== Chapecoense ===
He made his first team debut on 9 February 2017, starting in a 2–0 away loss against Cruzeiro, for the year's Primeira Liga.

In April 2019, after spending the two previous campaigns as a third-choice, Tiepo became a starter after João Ricardo's suspension and Elias' injury. New signing Vagner arrived, but also suffered a knee injury, and Tiepo was kept as the first-choice; he made his Série A debut on 27 April, making several key stops in a 2–0 home success over Internacional.

== Career statistics ==
As of 25 October 2021.

Club	Season	League			State League		Cup		Continental		Other		Total	
Club	Season	Division	Apps	Goals	Apps	Goals	Apps	Goals	Apps	Goals	Apps	Goals	Apps	Goals
Chapecoense	2017	Série A	0	0	0	0	0	0	—		1 (Note: Appearance(s) in Primeira Liga.)	0	1	0
Chapecoense	2018	Série A	0	0	0	0	0	0	—		—		0	0
Chapecoense	2019	Série A	25	0	4	0	2	0	0	0	—		31	0
Chapecoense	2020	Série B	0	0	1	0	2	0	—		—		3	0
Chapecoense	2021	Série A	3	0	1	0	2	0	—		—		6	0
Total			28	0	6	0	6	0	0	0	1	0	41	0

== Honours ==
Chapecoense

- Campeonato Catarinense: 2017, 2020
- Campeonato Brasileiro Série B: 2020
