= Universo ao Meu Redor =

Studio album by Marisa Monte
- Released: 2006
- Producer: Marisa Monte and Mario Caldato

Universo ao Meu Redor is a studio album by Brazilian singer Marisa Monte, released in March 2006. It was simultaneously released with Infinito Particular. It reached number two in Brasil Hot 100 Airplay.

== Track listing ==
1. Universo ao Meu Redor (Arnaldo Antunes/Carlinhos Brown/Marisa Monte)
2. O Bonde do Dom (Arnaldo Antunes/Carlinhos Brown/Marisa Monte)
3. Meu Canário (Jayme Silva)
4. Três Letrinhas (Galvão/Moraes Moreira)
5. Quatro Paredes (Arnaldo Antunes/Cézar Mendes/Marisa Monte)
6. Perdoa, Meu Amor (Casemiro Vieira)
7. Cantinho Escondido (Arnaldo Antunes/Cézar Mendes|Carlinhos Brown/Marisa Monte)
8. Statue of Liberty (Fernandinho Beat Box/David Byrne/Marisa Monte)
9. A Alma e a Matéria (Arnaldo Antunes/Carlinhos Brown/Marisa Monte)
10. Lágrimas e Tormentos (Argemiro Patrocínio)
11. Satisfeito (Arnaldo Antunes/Carlinhos Brown/Marisa Monte)
12. Para Mais Ninguém (Paulinho da Viola)
13. Vai Saber? (Adriana Calcanhotto)
14. Pétalas Esquecidas (Teresa Batista/Dona Ivone Lara)

== Charts ==
=== Year-end charts ===
Chart (2006)	Peak position
Brazilian Albums (Pro-Música Brasil)	13
