= Thiaguinho =

Thiaguinho or Tiaguinho is a Portuguese name derived from Tiago or Thiago, meaning little Tiago or Tiago junior, and may refer to:

- Thiaguinho (singer) (born 1983), born Thiago André Barbosa, Brazilian singer

== Footballers ==
- Thiaguinho (footballer, born 1984), Thiago Rocha da Cunha, Brazilian defensive midfielder
- Thiaguinho (footballer, born 1985), Thiago Silva de Paiva, Brazilian attacking midfielder
- Thiaguinho (footballer, born 1987), Thiago Benevides Gonçalves, Brazilian winger
- Thiaguinho (footballer, born 1990), Thiago dos Santos Menezes, Brazilian forward
- Thiaguinho (footballer, born 1997), Thiago Beserra dos Santos, Brazilian midfielder
- Thiaguinho (footballer, born 1998), Wytalo Thiago de Assis Lima, Brazilian striker
- Thiaguinho (footballer, born 2000), Thiago de Oliveira Silva, Brazilian attacking midfielder
- Tiaguinho (footballer, born 1994) (1994–2016), Tiago da Rocha Vieira, Brazilian forward
- Tiaguinho (footballer, born 2008), Tiago Augusto Gonçalves, Brazilian midfielder
- Tiaguinho (futsal player) (born 1998), Tiago André Santos Fernandes, Portuguese futsal player
