= Coronel Martins =

- Municipality
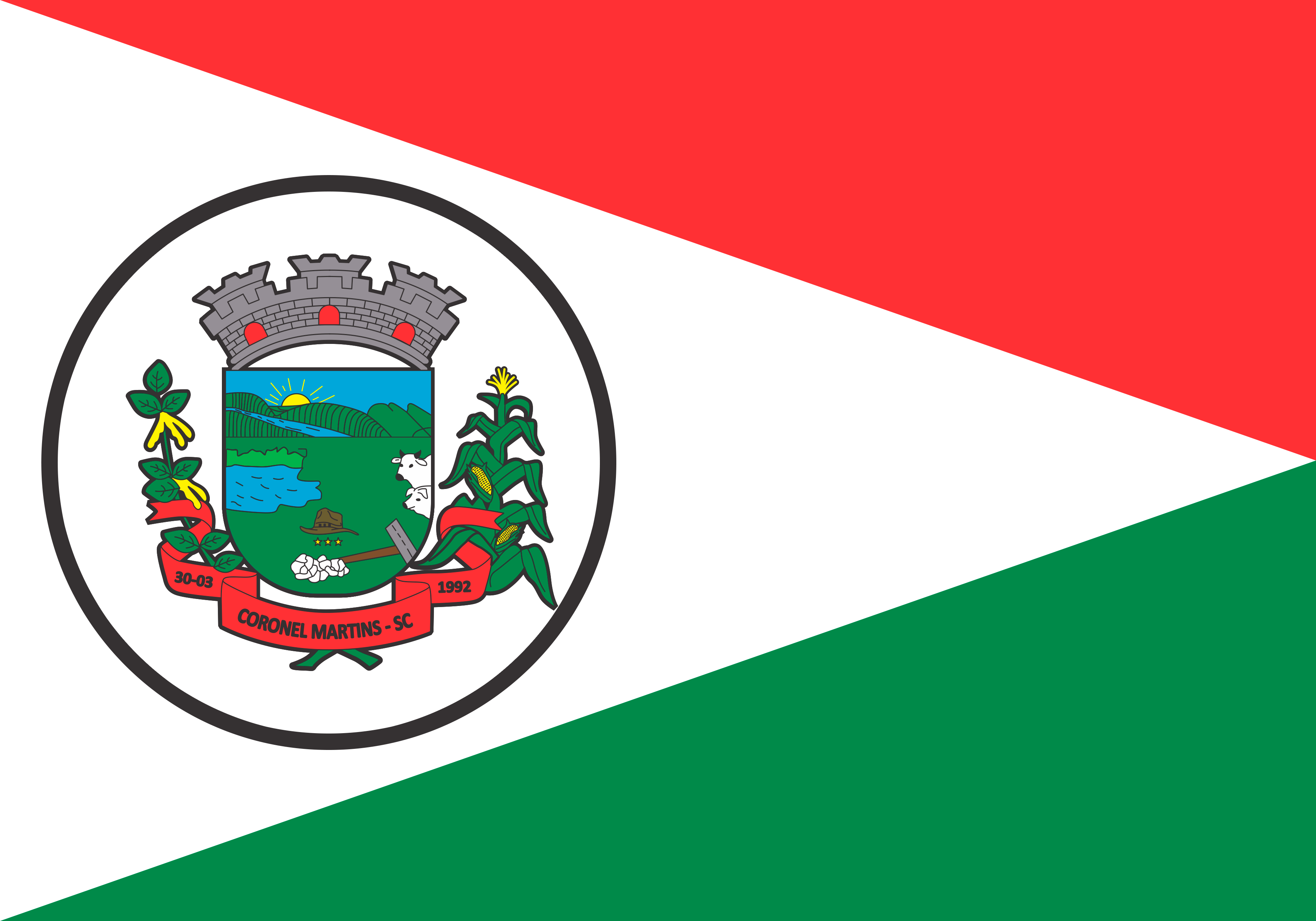
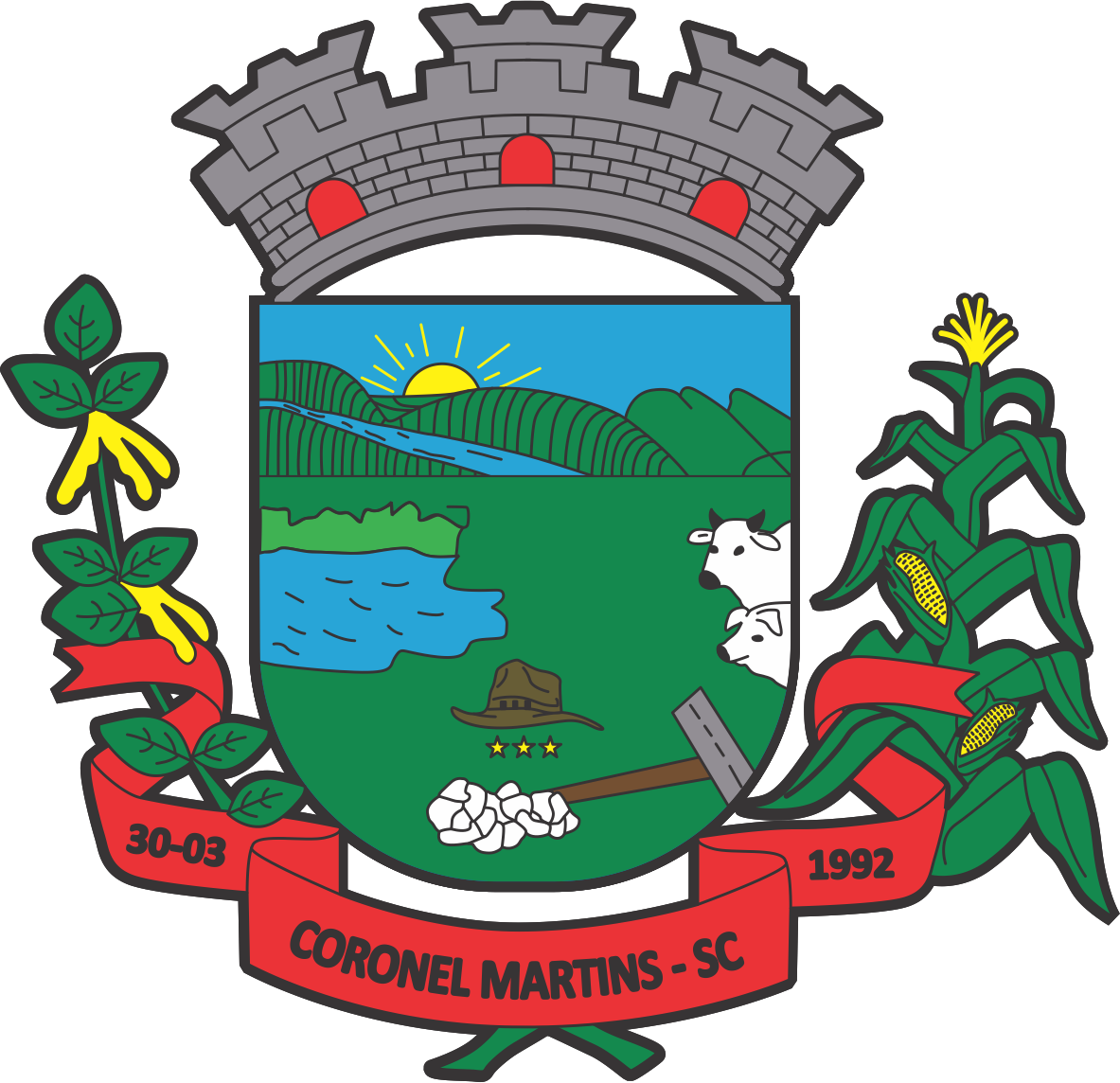
- Flag Coat of arms

- Location in Brazil
- Coordinates: 26°30′S 52°39′W
- Country: Brazil
- Region: South
- State: Santa Catarina
- Mesoregion: Oeste Catarinense

Population (2020)
  - Total: 2,555
- Time zone: UTC -3
- Website: www.coronelmartins.sc.gov.br

Coronel Martins is a municipality in the state of Santa Catarina in the South region of Brazil. It was created in 1992 out of the existing municipality of São Domingos.

== See also ==
- List of municipalities in Santa Catarina
