= Infinito Particular =

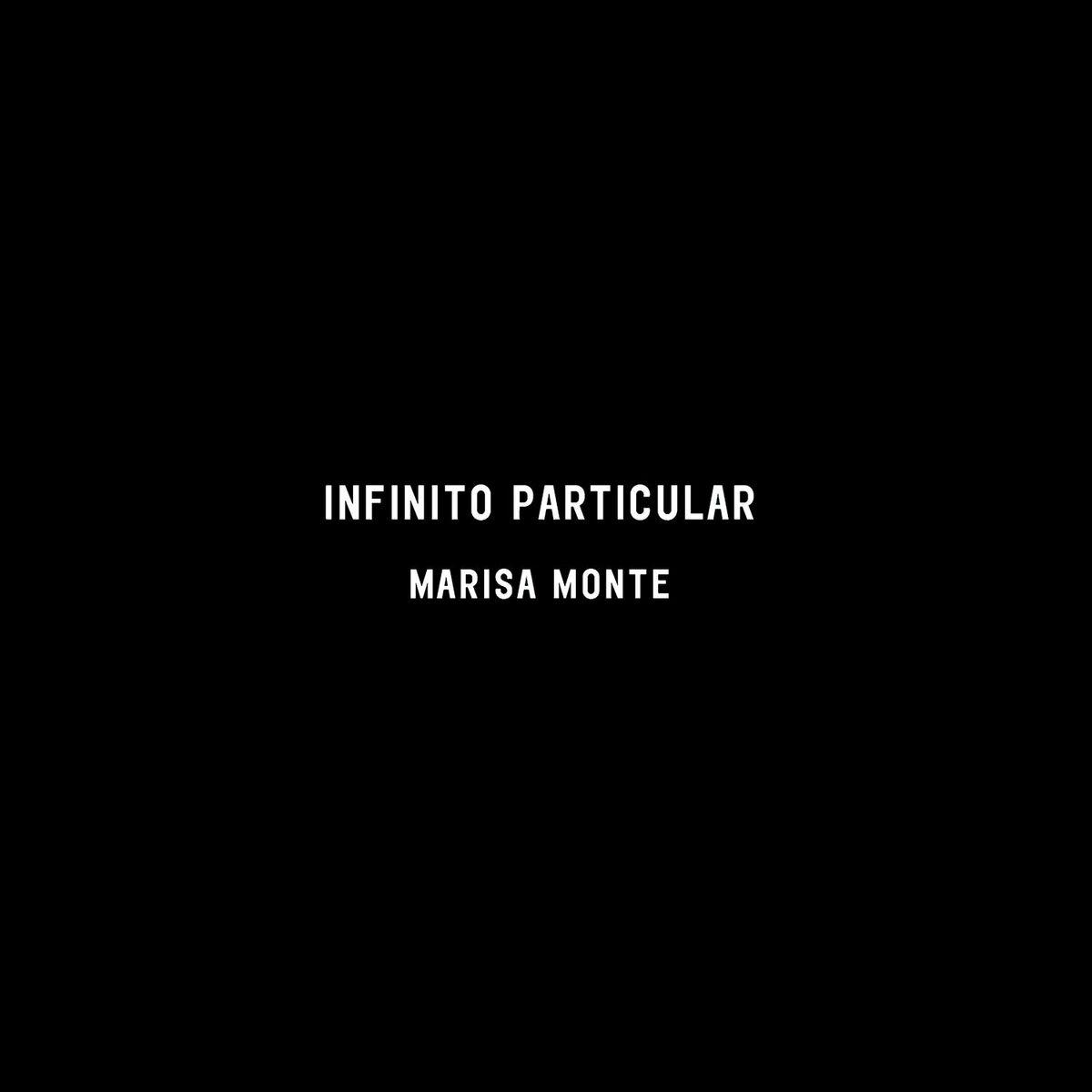

Studio album by Marisa Monte
- Released: 2006

Infinito Particular ("Private Infinity") is a studio album by Brazilian singer Marisa Monte, released in 2006. Its featured songs include "Infinito Particular", "Vilarejo" and "Pra Ser Sincero". The album was released simultaneously with another album from the same singer: Universo ao Meu Redor.

== Track listing ==
1. Infinito Particular (Arnaldo Antunes/Marisa Monte/Carlinhos Brown)
2. Vilarejo (Monte/Pedro Baby/Brown/Antunes)
3. Pra Ser Sincero (Brown/Monte)
4. Levante (Antunes/Brown/Monte/Seu Jorge)
5. Aquela (Monte/Leonardo Reis)
6. A Primeira Pedra (Brown/Monte/Antunes)
7. O Rio (Jorge/Brown/Antunes/Monte)
8. Gerânio (Nando Reis/Monte/Jennifer Gomes)
9. Quem foi (Monte/Marcelo Yuka)
10. Pernambucolismo (Monte/Rodrigo Campello)
11. Aconteceu (Monte/Antunes)
12. Até Parece (Monte/Dadi/Antunes/Brown)
13. Pelo Tempo que Durar (Adriana Calcanhotto/Monte)

== Charts ==
=== Year-end charts ===
| Chart (2006) | Peak position |
|---|---|
| Brazilian Albums (Pro-Música Brasil) | 12 |
