= Iago (footballer, born 1995) =

Brazilian footballer

Personal information
- Full name: Iago Sampaio Silva
- Date of birth: 21 May 1995 (age 31)
- Place of birth: Rio de Janeiro, Brazil
- Height: 1.70 m (5 ft 7 in)
- Position: Midfielder

Team information
- Current team: Patrocinense

Youth career
- –2013: Fluminense
- 2013–2016: Grêmio

Senior career*
Years	Team	Apps	(Gls)
2016–2018	Grêmio	12	(0)
2017	→ Figueirense (loan)	14	(0)
2018	→ Baltika Kaliningrad (loan)	1	(0)
2018	Criciúma	3	(0)
2019	Veranópolis	0	(0)
2020–	Patrocinense	0	(0)
- * Club domestic league appearances and goals as of 19:21, 2 August 2020 (UTC)

Iago Sampaio Silva, known as Iago (born 21 May 1995) is a Brazilian football player who plays for Patrocinense.

== Club career ==
He made his Campeonato Brasileiro Série A debut for Grêmio on 24 July 2016 in a game against São Paulo.

On 5 January 2018, he signed with the Russian club FC Baltika Kaliningrad on a year-long loan.
