= Bom Sucesso do Sul =

- Municipality
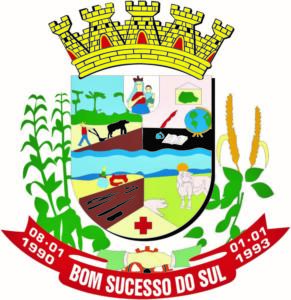
- Flag Coat of arms

- Location in Brazil
- Coordinates: 26°4′33″S 52°50′2″W
- Country: Brazil
- Region: Southern
- State: Paraná
- Mesoregion: Sudoeste Paranaense

Population (2020)
  - Total: 3,254
- Time zone: UTC−3 (BRT)

Bom Sucesso do Sul is a municipality in the state of Paraná in the Southern Region of Brazil.

== See also ==
- List of municipalities in Paraná
