= Diego Jussani =

Brazilian footballer (born 1987)

Personal information
- Full name: Diego Jussani
- Date of birth: 7 September 1987 (age 39)
- Place of birth: Americana, Brazil
- Height: 1.89 m (6 ft 2 in)
- Position: Defender

Team information
- Current team: Oeste

Senior career*
Years	Team	Apps	(Gls)
2009	Brasilis		
2009	Itapirense		
2010–2011	Ponte Preta	13	(2)
2011	Bahia	2	(0)
2012–2013	Joinville	45	(1)
2014	São Bernardo	7	(0)
2014	ABC	11	(1)
2015	São Bernardo	14	(0)
2015–2016	CRB	39	(5)
2017	Guarani	33	(3)
2018	Fortaleza	34	(2)
2019	América Mineiro	2	(0)
2019	Vila Nova	29	(2)
2020	XV de Piracicaba	20	(1)
2020–2021	Portuguesa	34	(1)
2022–2023	Oeste	22	(0)
2024	Inter de Limeira		
- * Club domestic league appearances and goals as of 21:34, 14 September 2020 (UTC)

Diego Jussani (born 7 September 1987) is a Brazilian footballer who plays for Oeste as a defender.

== Club career ==
Born in Americana, São Paulo, Jussani started his senior professional career with Brasilis before moving to Ponte Preta in 2010. After having spent two seasons with the club, he moved to Bahia on 19 May 2011. His output in the 2011 season was his two appearances in the national league besides featuring for the under-23 team. On 27 December, he signed a contract extension, keeping him at the club for the 2012 season. On 18 January 2012, he made his Baiano debut against Alagoinhas in a 3–3 draw.

After being released by Bahia, Jussani signed with Joinville on 17 May 2012. In December 2013, he moved to São Bernardo. In the following summer, he signed with ABC Futebol Clube. On 7 July, he scored his first goal in a 1–1 draw against Globo.

In May 2015, Jussani moved to CRB. He contributed with six goals in 62 matches, as his club won the Alagoano in 2015 and 2016. After a stint with Guarani, he signed with Fortaleza on 20 December 2017.

On 26 December 2018, Jussani joined América Mineiro for the upcoming season. Only two games into the Série B season, and having been captain and first choice for América, he signed until the end of 2019 with Vila Nova.
