= Mateus da Silva =

Brazilian footballer

Personal information
- Full name: Mateus da Silva
- Date of birth: 30 August 1991 (age 35)
- Place of birth: Nossa Senhora da Gloria, Brazil
- Height: 1.84 m (6 ft 0 in)
- Position: Midfielder

Team information
- Current team: Tombense

Senior career*
Years	Team	Apps	(Gls)
2010	Ponte Preta	1	(0)
2011	Salgueiro	21	(0)
2012	Mogi Mirim	5	(0)
2013	Tombense	8	(1)
2014	Bragantino	12	(0)
2014–2016	Tombense	40	(4)
2016	Mirassol	21	(0)
2016–2018	Paços de Ferreira	20	(1)
2018	→ Nacional (loan)	7	(1)
2018	→ Guarani (loan)	0	(0)
2018–	Tombense	0	(0)
2019	→ CRB (loan)	5	(0)
2020	→ Primavera (loan)	0	(0)
2020-	→ Fidelis Andria	0	(26)
- * Club domestic league appearances and goals as of 24 October 2019

Mateus da Silva (born 30 August 1991) is a Brazilian footballer who plays for Fidelis Andria.
