= Vagner (footballer, born 1989) =

Brazilian footballer

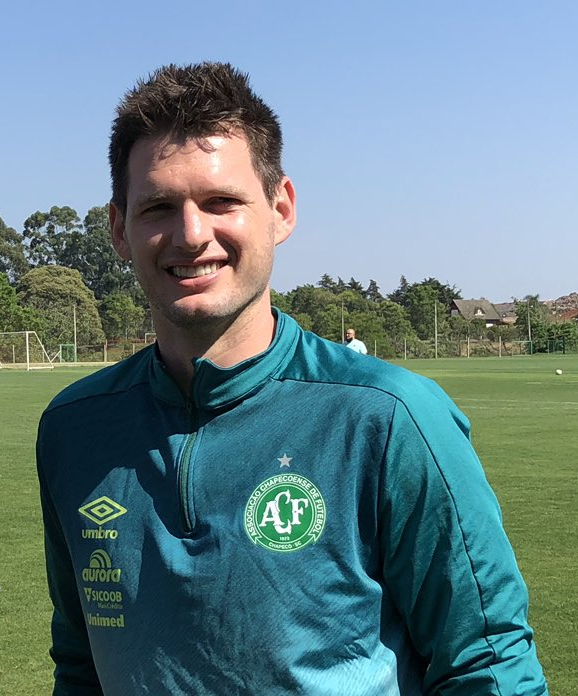
- Vagner with Chapecoense in 2020

Personal information
- Full name: Vagner Antônio Brandalise
- Date of birth: 24 August 1989 (age 37)
- Place of birth: Bom Sucesso do Sul, Brazil
- Height: 1.91 m (6 ft 3 in)
- Position: Goalkeeper

Team information
- Current team: Náutico
- Number: 1

Youth career
- Grêmio
- PSTC
- 2005–2007: Atlético Paranaense
- 2007–2009: Paulista

Senior career*
Years	Team	Apps	(Gls)
2009–2012	Paulista	22	(0)
2011	→ Villa Nova (loan)	10	(0)
2011	→ Criciúma (loan)	2	(0)
2013–2014	Ituano	23	(0)
2014–2015	Avaí	83	(0)
2016–2019	Palmeiras	3	(0)
2017	→ Mirassol (loan)	12	(0)
2017	→ Guarani (loan)	11	(0)
2018	→ Ituano (loan)	14	(0)
2018	→ Londrina (loan)	35	(0)
2019	→ Novorizontino (loan)	12	(0)
2019	→ Chapecoense (loan)	2	(0)
2020–2022	Chapecoense	18	(0)
2023–	Náutico	31	(0)
- * Club domestic league appearances and goals as of 6 June 2023

Vagner Antônio Brandalise (born 3 June 1989), simply known as Vagner, is a Brazilian footballer who plays as a goalkeeper for Náutico.

== Club career ==
Born in Bom Sucesso do Sul, Paraná, Vagner graduated with Paulista's youth setup. He made his senior debut on 1 February, starting in a 4–1 home routing over Guaratinguetá for the Campeonato Paulista championship.

After loans at Vila Nova and Criciúma, Vagner joined Ituano on 8 November 2012. He appeared regularly for the side, being a starter during the club's Paulistão winning campaign.

On 17 April 2014 Vagner signed for Avaí. On 22 December, after appearing in 36 matches and being promoted to Série A, he renewed his link with the club.

On 10 December 2015, after his side was immediately relegated back to the second tier, Vagner signed a four-year deal with Palmeiras.

== Career statistics ==
=== Club ===
As of match played 2 January 2025

Appearances and goals by club, season and competition
Club	Season	League			State league		National cup (Note: Includes Copa do Brasil, Copa Paraguay)		Continental		Other		Total	
Club	Season	Division	Apps	Goals	Apps	Goals	Apps	Goals	Apps	Goals	Apps	Goals	Apps	Goals
Paulista	2009	—			3 (Note: Appearance(s) in Campeonato Paulista)	0	—		—		—		3	0
Paulista	2010	—			0	0	—		—		—		0	0
Paulista	2012	—			19	0	2	0	—		—		21	0
Paulista	Total		—		22	0	2	0	0	0	0	0	24	0
Villa Nova (loan)	2011	Série D	0	0	10 (Note: Appearance(s) in Campeonato Mineiro)	0	—		—		—		10	0
Criciúma (loan)	2011	Série B	2	0	0	0	—		—		—		2	0
Ituano	2013	—			4	0	—		—		19 (Note: Appearance(s) in Copa Paulista)	0	23	0
Ituano	2014	Série D	0	0	19	0	—		—		—		19	0
Ituano	Total		0	0	23	0	0	0	0	0	19	0	42	0
Avaí	2014	Série B	36	0	0	0	4	0	—		—		40	0
Avaí	2015	Série A	33	0	14 (Note: Appearance(s) in Campeonato Catarinense)	0	2	0	—		—		49	0
Avaí	Total		69	0	14	0	6	0	0	0	0	0	89	0
Palmeiras	2016	Série A	3	0	0	0	1	0	0	0	—		4	0
Mirassol (loan)	2017	—			12	0	—		—		—		12	0
Guarani (loan)	2017	Série B	11	0	0	0	—		—		—		11	0
Ituano (loan)	2018	—			14	0	1	0	—		0	0	15	0
Londrina (loan)	2018	Série B	35	0	0	0	0	0	—		—		35	0
Novorizontino (loan)	2019	Série D	0	0	12	0	—		—		—		12	0
Chapecoense (loan)	2019	Série A	0	0	0	0	2	0	0	0	—		2	0
Chapecoense	2020	Série B	0	0	0	0	0	0	—		0	0	0	0
Chapecoense	2021	Série A	0	0	0	0	0	0	—		0	0	0	0
Chapecoense	2022	Série B	18	0	0	0	0	0	—		0	0	18	0
Chapecoense	Total		18	0	0	0	0	0	0	0	0	0	18	0
Náutico	2023	Série C	18	0	12 (Note: Appearance(s) in Campeonato Pernambucano)	0	4	0	—		8 (Note: Appearance(s) in Copa do Nordeste)	0	42	0
Náutico	2024	Série C	4	0	13	0	—		—		9	0	26	0
Náutico	Total		22	0	25	0	4	0	0	0	17	0	68	0
Tacuary	2024	Paraguayan Primera División	15	0	—		0	0	—		—		15	0
Capital	2025	Série D	0	0	0	0	0	0	—		1 (Note: Appearance(s) in Copa Verde)	0	1	0
Career total			175	0	132	0	16	0	0	0	37	0	360	0

== Honours ==
Ituano

- Campeonato Paulista: 2014

Palmeiras

- Campeonato Brasileiro Série A: 2016

Chapecoense

- Campeonato Catarinense: 2020
- Campeonato Brasileiro Série B: 2020
