= Novo Horizonte, Bahia =

Municipality of Bahia, Brazil

Coordinates: 12°48′28″S 42°10′04″W

- Municipality
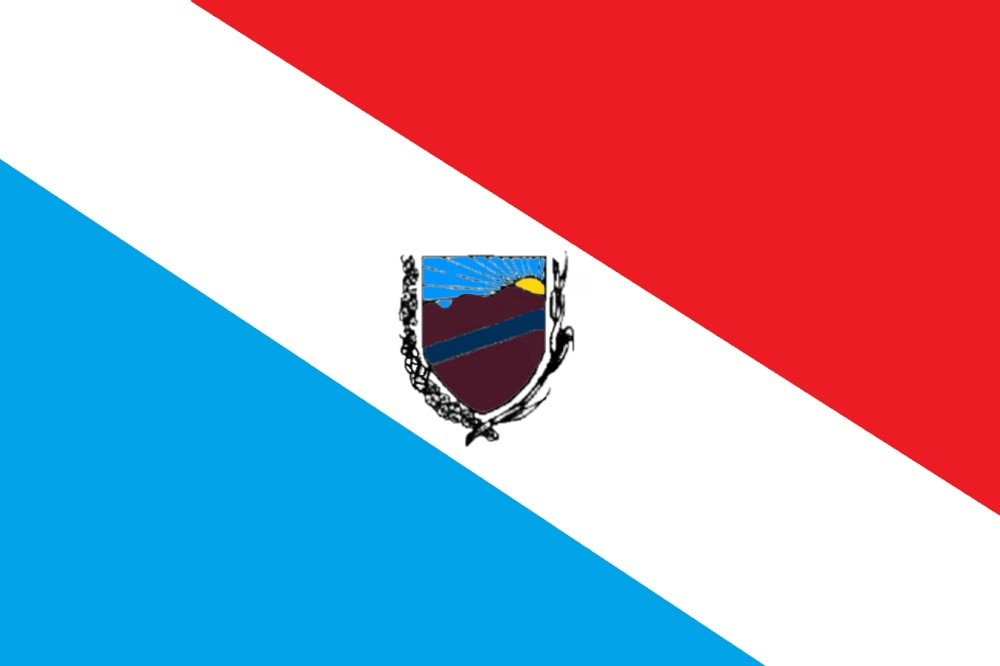
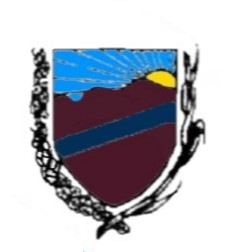
- Flag Coat of arms
- Interactive map of Novo Horizonte, Bahia
- Country: Brazil
- Region: Nordeste
- State: Bahia

Population (2020)
  - Total: 12,522
- Time zone: UTC−3 (BRT)

Novo Horizonte, Bahia is a municipality in the state of Bahia in the North-East region of Brazil.

== See also ==
- List of municipalities in Bahia
