= Carlos Eduardo (footballer, born October 1996) =

Brazilian footballer

Personal information
- Full name: Carlos Eduardo Ferreira de Souza
- Date of birth: 10 October 1996 (age 30)
- Place of birth: Nerópolis, Brazil
- Height: 1.73 m (5 ft 8 in)
- Position: Right winger

Team information
- Current team: Mirassol
- Number: 96

Youth career
- Goiás

Senior career*
Years	Team	Apps	(Gls)
2015–2018	Goiás	141	(26)
2018	Pyramids FC	10	(1)
2019–2023	Palmeiras	16	(1)
2020–2022	→ Athletico Paranaense (loan)	66	(9)
2022	→ Red Bull Bragantino (loan)	26	(0)
2023	→ Estoril (loan)	13	(2)
2023–2024	Alanyaspor	31	(4)
2024–2025	Vitória	23	(0)
2025–	Mirassol	35	(3)
- * Club domestic league appearances and goals as of 9 April 2026

Carlos Eduardo Ferreira de Souza (born 10 October 1996), known as Carlos Eduardo, is a Brazilian professional footballer who plays for Mirassol as a right winger.

== Career ==
=== Goiás ===
Born in Nerópolis, Goiás, Carlos Eduardo finished his formation with Goiás. He made his professional – and Série A – debut on 4 June 2015, starting in a 0–1 away loss against Sport.

Carlos Eduardo scored his first goal in the main category of Brazilian football on 8 July 2015, netting his team's last in a 4–1 home routing of Santos. He was mainly used as a substitute during his first season, which ended in relegation to Série B.

On 21 February 2017, Carlos Eduardo further extended his contract with the Esmeraldino. During that campaign, he was an undisputed starter, contributing with nine league goals as his side narrowly avoided another drop; highlights included a brace in a 2–1 home win against Santa Cruz on 7 June.

=== Pyramids FC ===
On 29 June 2018, Carlos Eduardo signed a three-year contract with Egyptian club Pyramids FC for a €6 million transfer fee. He made his debut for the club on 3 August, starting in a 1–0 away win against ENPPI SC.

Carlos Eduardo scored his first (and only) goal abroad on 28 November 2018, netting the last in a 2–0 away defeat of Nogoom FC.

=== Palmeiras ===
On 19 December 2018, Carlos Eduardo agreed to a five-year contract with Palmeiras back in his homeland, for a rumoured fee of US$ 6.5 million.

On 16 March 2019, Carlos Eduardo scored the game winning goal against São Paulo, his only goal for Palmeiras in the season.

==== Athletico Paranaense (loan) ====
On 7 January 2020, Carlos Eduardo signed a three-year loan deal with Athletico Paranaense.

==== Estoril (loan) ====
On 25 January 2023, Carlos Eduardo joined Primeira Liga club Estoril on loan until the end of the season.

== Career statistics ==
As of 13 October 2021

Appearances and goals by club, season and competition
Club	Season	League			State League		Cup		Continental		Other		Total	
Club	Season	Division	Apps	Goals	Apps	Goals	Apps	Goals	Apps	Goals	Apps	Goals	Apps	Goals
Goiás	2015	Série A	16	2	7	1	1	0	1 (Note: Appearance(s) in Copa Sudamericana)	0	—		25	3
Goiás	2016	Série B	25	4	16	5	2	1	—		—		43	10
Goiás	2017	Série B	37	9	17	2	5	1	—		—		59	12
Goiás	2018	Série B	12	2	11	1	7	2	—		—		30	5
Goiás	Total		90	17	51	9	15	4	1	0	—		157	27
Pyramids FC	2018–19	Egyptian Premier League	10	1	—		0	0	—		—		10	1
Palmeiras	2019	Série A	7	0	9	1	2	0	1 (Note: Appearance(s) in Copa Libertadores)	0	—		19	1
Athletico Paranaense	2020	Série A	30	7	7	1	2	0	6	0	0	0	45	8
Athletico Paranaense	2021	Série A	18	1	5	0	4	0	5	1	—		32	2
Athletico Paranaense	Total		48	8	12	1	6	0	11	1	0	0	77	10
Career total			155	26	72	11	23	4	13	1	0	0	253	39

== Honours ==
Goiás

- Campeonato Goiano: 2015, 2016, 2017, 2018

Athletico Paranaense

- Campeonato Paranaense: 2020
- Copa Sudamericana: 2021
