= Capixaba (footballer) =

Brazilian footballer (born 1997)

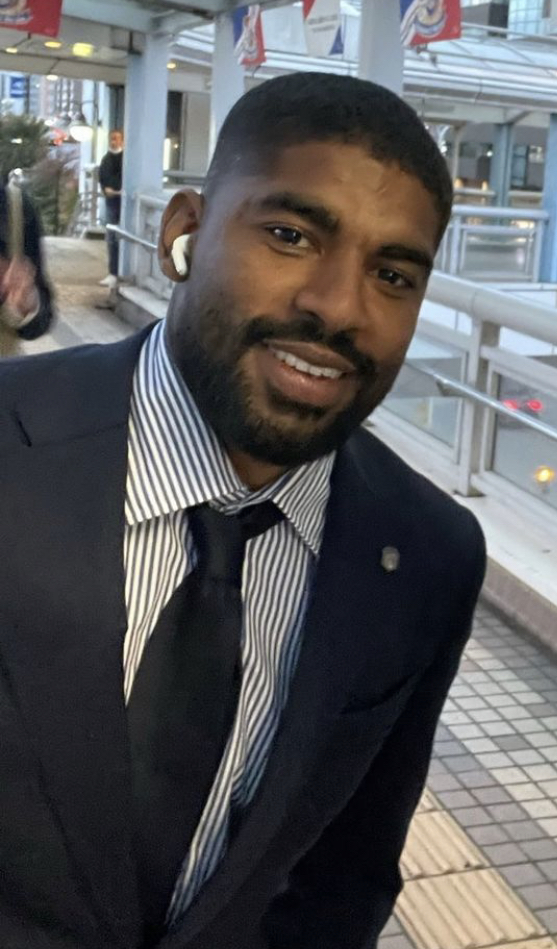
- Capixaba in 2024.

Personal information
- Full name: João Victor da Vitória Fernandes
- Date of birth: 9 January 1997 (age 29)
- Place of birth: Guarapari, Brazil
- Height: 1.70 m (5 ft 7 in)
- Position: Forward

Team information
- Current team: Shimizu S-Pulse
- Number: 7

Youth career
- 2013–2017: Atlético Mineiro

Senior career*
Years	Team	Apps	(Gls)
2016–2021	Atlético Mineiro	7	(0)
2017	→ Ferroviária (loan)	8	(1)
2018	→ América Mineiro (loan)	10	(1)
2018	→ Chapecoense (loan)	3	(0)
2019	→ Vila Nova (loan)	34	(2)
2020	→ Novorizontino (loan)	8	(1)
2020	→ Coimbra (loan)	2	(0)
2020–2021	→ Juventude (loan)	27	(3)
2021–2022	Juventude	84	(6)
2023–2024	Cerezo Osaka	54	(2)
2025–	Shimizu S-Pulse	40	(3)
- * Club domestic league appearances and goals as of 10 August 2026

João Victor da Vitória Fernandes (born 9 January 1997), commonly known as Capixaba, is a Brazilian professional footballer who plays as a forward for J1 League club Shimizu S-Pulse.

== Club career ==
=== Atlético Mineiro ===
Born in Guarapari, Espírito Santo, Capixaba joined Atlético Mineiro's youth setup in 2013. He made his professional debut on 2 April 2016, in a 7–2 Campeonato Mineiro win over Villa Nova.

He played for Juventude between 2020 and 2021, appearing 31 times, scoring thrice and helping them to a third-place finish in the 2020 Campeonato Brasileiro Série B, which meant the club returned to the top division after a 14-year absence.

=== Juventude ===
In February 2021, he joined Juventude on a permanent basis.

=== Cerezo Osaka ===
On 8 January 2023, Capixaba officially joined Japanese side Cerezo Osaka on a permanent deal.

=== Shimizu S-Pulse ===
On 19 December 2024, it was announced that Capixaba had officially joined Shimizu S-Pulse on a permanent deal.
