= João Carlos (footballer, born 1988) =

Brazilian footballer

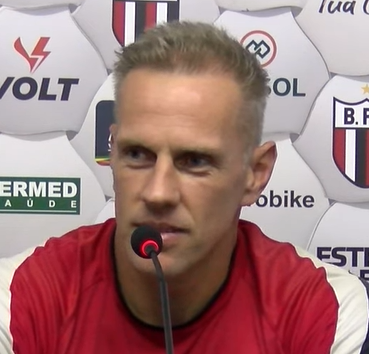
- João Carlos in 2024

Personal information
- Full name: João Carlos Heidemann
- Date of birth: 6 April 1988 (age 38)
- Place of birth: Paranavaí, Brazil
- Height: 1.90 m (6 ft 3 in)
- Position: Goalkeeper

Team information
- Current team: Cuiabá
- Number: 1

Youth career
- 2003–2008: Atlético Paranaense

Senior career*
Years	Team	Apps	(Gls)
2008–2015	Atlético Paranaense	14	(0)
2009	→ Ipatinga (loan)	9	(0)
2011	→ Atlético Goianiense (loan)	0	(0)
2011	→ Ipatinga (loan)	11	(0)
2012–2013	→ Fortaleza (loan)	38	(0)
2014	→ Nacional-MG (loan)	11	(0)
2014	→ Boa Esporte (loan)	27	(0)
2015	→ Ponte Preta (loan)	9	(0)
2016–2017	Ponte Preta	32	(0)
2018	CRB	48	(0)
2019	CSA	20	(0)
2020–2023	Cuiabá	64	(0)
2024–2025	Botafogo-SP	48	(0)
2026–	Cuiabá	26	(0)

International career
2004–2005	Brazil U17	0	(0)
- * Club domestic league appearances and goals as of 18 November 2026

João Carlos Heidemann (born 6 April 1988), known as João Carlos, is a Brazilian footballer who plays as a goalkeeper for Cuiabá.

== Career statistics ==
As of 4 January 2024.

Club	Season	League			State League		Cup		Continental		Other		Total	
Club	Season	Division	Apps	Goals	Apps	Goals	Apps	Goals	Apps	Goals	Apps	Goals	Apps	Goals
Atlético Paranaense	2008	Série A	0	0	0	0	0	0	—		—		0	0
Atlético Paranaense	2010	Série A	5	0	1	0	0	0	—		—		6	0
Atlético Paranaense	2011	Série A	0	0	8	0	0	0	—		—		8	0
Atlético Paranaense	2012	Série B	0	0	0	0	0	0	—		—		0	0
Atlético Paranaense	Total		5	0	9	0	0	0	—		—		14	0
Ipatinga (loan)	2009	Série B	9	0	0	0	0	0	—		—		9	0
Atlético Goianiense (loan)	2011	Série A	0	0	—		—		—		—		0	0
Ipatinga (loan)	2011	Série C	11	0	—		—		—		—		11	0
Fortaleza (loan)	2012	Série C	2	0	7	0	3	0	—		—		12	0
Fortaleza (loan)	2013	Série C	14	0	15	0	6	0	—		10 (Note: Appearance(s) in Copa do Nordeste)	0	45	0
Fortaleza (loan)	Total		16	0	22	0	9	0	—		10	0	57	0
Nacional-MG (loan)	2014	Mineiro	—		11	0	—		—		—		11	0
Boa Esporte (loan)	2014	Série B	27	0	—		—		—		—		27	0
Ponte Preta	2015	Série A	1	0	8	0	3	0	0	0	—		12	0
Ponte Preta	2016	Série A	17	0	14	0	6	0	—		—		37	0
Ponte Preta	2017	Série A	1	0	0	0	0	0	1 (Note: Appearance(s) in Copa Sudamericana)	0	—		2	0
Ponte Preta	Total		19	0	22	0	9	0	1	0	—		51	0
CRB	2018	Série B	38	0	10	0	4	0	—		10	0	62	0
CSA	2019	Série A	11	0	9	0	1	0	—		9	0	30	0
Cuiabá	2020	Série B	33	0	2	0	4	0	—		3 (Note: Appearance(s) in Copa Verde)	0	42	0
Cuiabá	2021	Série A	4	0	5	0	0	0	—		0	0	9	0
Cuiabá	2022	Série A	11	0	1	0	0	0	3	0	—		15	0
Cuiabá	2023	Série A	3	0	5	0	0	0	—		—		8	0
Cuiabá	Total		51	0	13	0	4	0	3	0	3	0	74	0
Botafogo-SP	2024	Série B	0	0	0	0	—		—		—		0	0
Career total			187	0	96	0	27	0	4	0	32	0	345	0

== Honours ==
Atlético Goianiense

- Campeonato Goiano: 2011

CSA

- Campeonato Alagoano: 2019

Cuiabá

- Campeonato Mato-Grossense: 2021, 2022, 2023
