= Saulo (footballer, born 1995) =

Brazilian footballer

Personal information
- Full name: Saulo Ferreira Silva
- Date of birth: 20 April 1995 (age 31)
- Place of birth: Belo Horizonte, Brazil
- Height: 1.90 m (6 ft 3 in)
- Position: Goalkeeper

Team information
- Current team: Ituano

Youth career
- 2013–2017: Botafogo

Senior career*
Years	Team	Apps	(Gls)
2017–2020	Botafogo	23	(0)
2019	→ Vila Nova (loan)	1	(0)
2021–2022	Sport	14	(0)
2023	Londrina	12	(0)
2024–	Ituano	24	(0)
- * Club domestic league appearances and goals as of 11 November 2026

Saulo Ferreira Silva (born 20 April 1995), commonly known as Saulo, is a Brazilian footballer who plays as a goalkeeper for Ituano.

== Career statistics ==
=== Club ===
As of 8 April 2019.

Club	Season	League			State League		Cup		Continental		Other		Total	
Club	Season	Division	Apps	Goals	Apps	Goals	Apps	Goals	Apps	Goals	Apps	Goals	Apps	Goals
Botafogo	2017	Série A	0	0	2	0	0	0	—		—		2	0
Botafogo	2018	Série A	17	0	0	0	0	0	3 (Note: Appearance(s) in Copa Sudamericana)	0	—		20	0
Botafogo	2019	Série A	0	0	—		—		—		—		0	0
Botafogo	Total		17	0	2	0	0	0	3	0	—		22	0
Vila Nova (loan)	2019	Série B	0	0	1	0	0	0	—		—		1	0
Career total			17	0	3	0	0	0	3	0	0	0	23	0

== Honours ==
Botafogo

- Campeonato Carioca: 2018
