= Thiaguinho (footballer, born 1998) =

Brazilian footballer

Personal information
- Full name: Wytallo Thiago Lima da Silva
- Date of birth: 2 January 1998 (age 28)
- Height: 1.70 m (5 ft 7 in)
- Position: Striker

Team information
- Current team: Marcílio Dias

Youth career
- Ponte Preta

Senior career*
Years	Team	Apps	(Gls)
2018	Ponte Preta	2	(0)
2019	CSA	0	(0)
2019	Inter de Limeira	0	(0)
2020	Desportivo Brasil	7	(0)
2020	Inter de Limeira	0	(0)
2021–	Marcílio Dias	4	(0)
- * Club domestic league appearances and goals as of 21 August 2021

Wytallo Thiago Lima da Silva (born 2 January 1998), commonly known as Thiaguinho, is a Brazilian footballer who plays for Marcílio Dias as a striker.

== Club career ==
A product of the youth academy of Ponte Preta, Thiaguinho started training with the senior team in January 2018. On 22 January, he made his first team debut, coming on as a substitute for Léo Melo in a 1–0 defeat against Linense, in Campeonato Paulista. On 10 September, his contract was terminated by the club.

On 1 January 2019, Thiaguinho signed with CSA, newly promoted to Série A.

== Career statistics ==
As of match played 25 January 2018

Appearances and goals by club, season and competition
Club	Season	League			State League		National Cup		Continental		Total	
Club	Season	Division	Apps	Goals	Apps	Goals	Apps	Goals	Apps	Goals	Apps	Goals
Ponte Preta	2018	Série B	0	0	2	0	0	0	—		2	0
Career total			0	0	2	0	0	0	0	0	2	0
