= São Domingos, Santa Catarina =

São Domingos
- Municipality
- Flag Coat of arms

- Coordinates: 26°33′28″S 52°31′55″W
- Country: Brazil
- Region: South
- State: Santa Catarina
- Mesoregion: Oeste Catarinense

Population (2020)
  - Total: 9,434
- Time zone: UTC -3
- Website: www.saodomingos.sc.gov.br

São Domingos is a municipality in the state of Santa Catarina in the South region of Brazil.

== See also ==
- List of municipalities in Santa Catarina
