= Matheus Fernandes =

Brazilian footballer

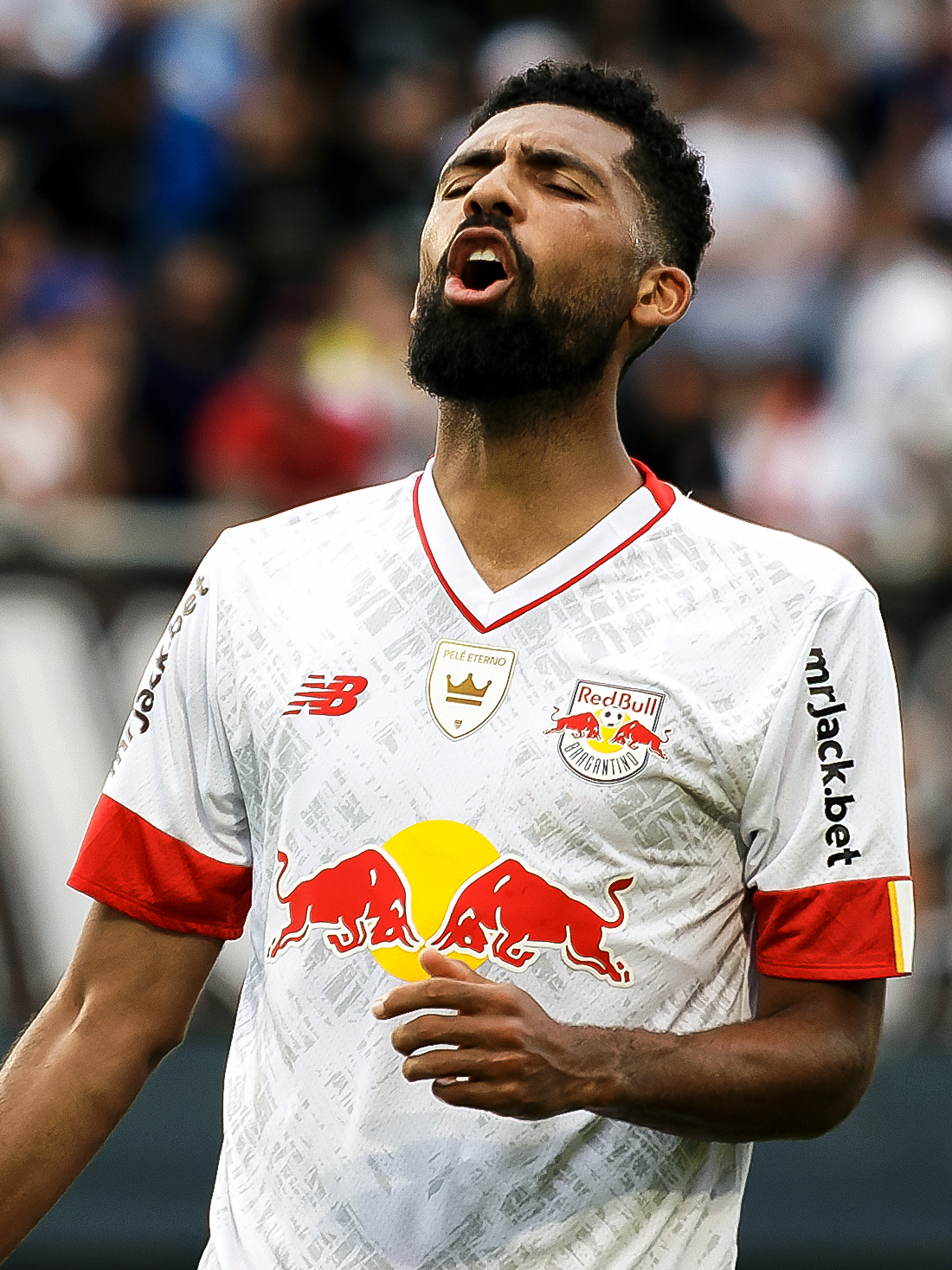
- Matheus Fernandes with Red Bull Bragantino in 2023

Personal information
- Full name: Matheus Fernandes Siqueira
- Date of birth: 30 June 1998 (age 28)
- Place of birth: Itaboraí, Brazil
- Height: 1.83 m (6 ft 0 in)
- Position: Central midfielder

Team information
- Current team: Red Bull Bragantino
- Number: 35

Youth career
- 2015–2016: Botafogo

Senior career*
Years	Team	Apps	(Gls)
2016–2018	Botafogo	68	(0)
2019–2020	Palmeiras	11	(1)
2020	→ Valladolid (loan)	3	(0)
2020–2021	Barcelona	1	(0)
2021–2024	Palmeiras	7	(0)
2022	→ Athletico Paranaense (loan)	18	(0)
2023	→ Red Bull Bragantino (loan)	46	(1)
2024–	Red Bull Bragantino	63	(4)

International career
2014	Brazil U17	2	(0)
2016	Brazil U20	2	(0)
- * Club domestic league appearances and goals as of 7 April 2026

Matheus Fernandes Siqueira (born 30 June 1998) is a Brazilian professional footballer who plays as a central midfielder for Red Bull Bragantino.

== Club career ==
=== Botafogo ===
Born in Itaboraí, Rio de Janeiro, Fernandes represented Botafogo as a youth. He was called up to the 2016 pre-season with the main squad, but was only promoted to the first team by manager Jair Ventura; late in the year, he renewed his contract until the end of 2019.

Fernandes made his senior debut on 28 January 2017, starting in a 1–1 Campeonato Carioca home draw against Nova Iguaçu. Four days later he made his Copa Libertadores debut, replacing Camilo in a 2–1 home win against Colo-Colo.

Fernandes was a regular starter for Bota during the 2018 campaign, appearing in 32 league matches (40 overall) and winning the year's Campeonato Carioca. He scored his first professional goal on 10 May of that year, netting the opener in a 1–1 Copa Sudamericana home draw against Audax Italiano (3–2 aggregate win).

=== Palmeiras ===
On 19 December 2018, Fernandes signed a five-year contract with Palmeiras, for a rumoured fee of R$ 15 million. A backup to regular starters Felipe Melo and Bruno Henrique, he was not registered for the year's Campeonato Paulista, and only made his debut for the club on 1 May, replacing Moisés in a 1–1 away draw against CSA.

Fernandes started to feature more regularly after Moisés' departure to Shandong Luneng, and scored his first goal on 1 December 2019, but in a 1–3 home loss against Flamengo.

==== Valladolid (loan) ====
On 31 January 2020, just hours after signing for Barcelona, Fernandes joined fellow La Liga side Real Valladolid on loan from Palmeiras. He only made his debut abroad on 20 June, starting in a 0–1 loss at Atlético Madrid.

=== Barcelona ===
On 31 January 2020, Barcelona announced that they had reached agreement with Palmeiras for the transfer of Fernandes, who would join the Catalan club ahead of the 2020–21 season at the end of September, after completing his loan spell with Real Valladolid. Barça paid a fee of €7 million plus €3 million on add-ons, and the player agreed to a five-year contract with the club. On 24 November, he made his first and only appearance for Barcelona's first team and also in the UEFA Champions League when he replaced Pedri for the final 17 minutes during a 4–0 away victory against Dynamo Kyiv in a Champions League group stage match.

On 17 April 2021, Matheus won his first and only trophy with Barcelona after his side defeated Athletic Bilbao 4–0 in the Copa del Rey final. Although he didn't feature for a single minute in the competition, he was considered as a winner as he was named in the matchday squads in two of the matches.

On 29 June 2021, his contract was terminated by Barcelona.

=== Return to Palmeiras ===
On 9 July 2021, Palmeiras signed Matheus for 4 1/2 seasons, till 31 December 2025, after his contract with Barcelona was terminated.

== International career ==
Fernandes represented Brazil at under-17 and under-20 levels.

== Career statistics ==
=== Club ===
As of match played 15 February 2025

Appearances and goals by club, season and competition
Club	Season	League			State league		National cup (Note: Includes Copa do Brasil, Copa del Rey)		Continental		Other		Total	
Club	Season	Division	Apps	Goals	Apps	Goals	Apps	Goals	Apps	Goals	Apps	Goals	Apps	Goals
Botafogo	2016	Série A	0	0	0	0	0	0	—		—		0	0
Botafogo	2017	Série A	22	0	6 (Note: Appearance(s) in Campeonato Carioca)	0	5	0	7 (Note: Appearance(s) in Copa Libertadores)	0	—		40	0
Botafogo	2018	Série A	33	0	7	0	0	0	5 (Note: Appearance(s) in Copa Sudamericana)	1	—		45	1
Botafogo	Total		55	0	13	0	5	0	12	1	0	0	85	1
Palmeiras	2019	Série A	11	1	0	0	1	0	0	0	—		12	1
Palmeiras	2020	Série A	0	0	0	0	0	0	0	0	0	0	0	0
Palmeiras	Total		11	1	0	0	1	0	0	0	0	0	12	1
Valladolid (loan)	2019-20	La Liga	3	0	—		0	0	—		—		3	0
Barcelona	2020-21	La Liga	0	0	—		0	0	1 (Note: Appearance(s) in UEFA Champions League)	0	0	0	1	0
Palmeiras	2021	Série A	7	0	0	0	0	0	0	0	0	0	7	0
Palmeiras	2022	Série A	0	0	0	0	0	0	0	0	—		0	0
Palmeiras	2023	Série A	0	0	0	0	0	0	0	0	0	0	0	0
Palmeiras	2024	Série A	0	0	0	0	0	0	0	0	0	0	0	0
Palmeiras	2025	Série A	0	0	0	0	0	0	0	0	0	0	0	0
Palmeiras	Total		7	0	0	0	0	0	0	0	0	0	7	0
Athletico Paranaense (loan)	2022	Série A	14	0	4 (Note: Appearance(s) in Campeonato Paranaense)	0	3	0	6 (Note: Four appearances in Copa Libertadores, Two appearances in Recopa Sudamericana)	0	—		27	0
Red Bull Bragantino (loan)	2023	Série A	33	1	13 (Note: Appearance(s) in Campeonato Paulista)	0	2	0	7	0	—		55	1
Red Bull Bragantino (loan)	2024	Série A	16	1	8	0	2	0	6 (Note: One appearance in Copa Libertadores, Five appearances in Copa Sudamericana)	0	—		32	1
Red Bull Bragantino (loan)	2025	Série A	0	0	4	1	0	0	0	0	—		4	1
Red Bull Bragantino (loan)	Total		49	2	25	1	4	0	13	0	0	0	91	3
Career total			139	3	42	1	13	0	32	1	0	0	226	5

== Honours ==
=== Club ===
Botafogo

- Campeonato Carioca: 2018

Barcelona

- Copa del Rey: 2020–21

Palmeiras

- Copa Libertadores: 2021
