= 2016 Campeonato Paulista knockout stage =

The knockout stage of the 2016 Campeonato Paulista began on 16 April with the quarter-final and was concluded on 8 May 2016 with the final. A total of eight teams competed in the knockout stage, with Santos being crowned champions after a 2–1 aggregate win against Audax.

== Round and draw dates ==
All draws held at Federação Paulista de Futebol headquarters in São Paulo, Brazil.

| Round | Draw date | First leg | Second leg |
|---|---|---|---|
| Quarter-finals | 11 April 2016 | 16–18 April 2016 | – |
| Semi-finals | 19 April 2016 | 23–24 April 2016 | – |
| Finals | 25 April 2016 | 1 May 2016 | 8 May 2016 |

== Format ==
With the exception of the final, which is played over two legs, each tie is played over a single leg, with the team with the best placing in the general table playing at home. The quarterfinals are played between the winners and runners-up of each group. In the semifinals the best team (first) will face the team with the worst campaign (fourth), while the second will face the team with the third best campaign.

== Qualified teams ==
| Group | Winners | Runners-up |
|---|---|---|
| A | Santos | São Bento |
| B | Palmeiras | São Bernardo |
| C | Audax | São Paulo |
| D | Corinthians | Red Bull Brasil |

=== Bracket ===
Quarterfinals
A1 | Santos | 2
A2 | São Bento | 0
B1 | Palmeiras | 2
B2 | São Bernardo | 0
D1 | Corinthians | 4
D2 | Red Bull Brasil | 0
C1 | Audax | 4
C2 | São Paulo | 1

Semifinals
A1 | Santos | 2 (3)
B1 | Palmeiras | 2 (2)
D1 | Corinthians | 2 (1)
C1 | Audax | 2 (4)

Finals
A1 | Santos | 1 | 1 | 2
C1 | Audax | 1 | 0 | 1

== Quarterfinals ==
| Team 1 | Score | Team 2 |
|---|---|---|
| Corinthians | 4–0 | Red Bull Brasil |
| Santos | 2–0 | São Bento |
| Audax | 4–1 | São Paulo |
| Palmeiras | 2–0 | São Bernardo |

16 April 2016
16:20 (UTC−03)

| Corinthians | 4 – 0 | Red Bull Brasil |
|---|---|---|
| Giovanni Augusto 16'; André 39'; Alan Mineiro 56'; Lucca 68' | Report |

Arena Corinthians, São Paulo
Attendance: 37,340
Referee: Luiz Flávio de Oliveira

16 April 2016
18:30 (UTC−03)

| Santos | 2 – 0 | São Bento |
|---|---|---|
| Vitor Bueno 9', 41' | Report |

Vila Belmiro, Santos
Attendance: 12,051
Referee: Vinícius Gonçalves Dias Araújo

17 April 2016
18:30 (UTC−03)

| Audax | 4 – 1 | São Paulo |
|---|---|---|
| Ytalo 27', 42'; Mike 51'; Juninho 70' | Report | 34' Calleri |

José Liberatti, Osasco
Attendance: 7,920
Referee: José Cláudio Rocha Filho

18 April 2016
21:00 (UTC−03)

| Palmeiras | 2 – 0 | São Bernardo |
|---|---|---|
| Alecsandro 36'; Gabriel Jesus 87' | Report |

Allianz Parque, São Paulo
Attendance: 30,731
Referee: Vinicius Furlan

== Semifinals ==
| Team 1 | Score | Team 2 |
|---|---|---|
| Corinthians | 2–2 (1–4 p) | Audax |
| Santos | 2–2 (3–2 p) | Palmeiras |

23 April 2016
18:30 (UTC−03)

| Corinthians | 2 – 2 | Audax |
|---|---|---|
| André 51', 78' | Report | 25' Bruno Paulo; 70' Tchê Tchê |
Penalties
| André (penalty scored); Fagner (penalty missed); Rodriguinho (penalty missed) | 1 – 4 | (penalty scored) Velicka; (penalty scored) Tchê Tchê; (penalty scored) Ytalo; (penalty scored) Camacho |

Arena Corinthians, São Paulo
Attendance: 41,343
Referee: Thiago Duarte Peixoto

24 April 2016
16:00 (UTC−03)

| Santos | 2 – 2 | Palmeiras |
|---|---|---|
| Gabriel 40', 74' | Report | 88', 89' Rafael Marques |
Penalties
| Lucas Lima (penalty missed); David Braz (penalty scored); Zeca (penalty scored); Victor Ferraz (penalty scored) | 3 – 2 | (penalty scored) Cleiton Xavier; (penalty missed) Barrios; (penalty scored) Jean; (penalty missed) Rafael Marques; (penalty missed) Fernando Prass |

Vila Belmiro, Santos
Attendance: 13,690
Referee: Marcelo Aparecido de Souza

== Finals ==
| Team 1 | Agg. | Team 2 | 1st leg | 2nd leg |
|---|---|---|---|---|
| Santos | 2–1 | Audax | 1–1 | 1–0 |

May 1
16:00 (UTC−03)

| Audax | 1–1 | Santos |
|---|---|---|
| Mike 58' | Report | 80' Ronaldo Mendes |

José Liberatti, Osasco
Attendance: 12,669
Referee: Flávio Rodrigues de Souza

| Audax | Santos |

| GK | 1 | (Brazil) Sidão |
| CB | 6 | (Brazil) André Castro | (yellow card) 40' |
| CB | 3 | (Brazil) Bruno Silva |
| CB | 4 | (Brazil) Velicka |
| RWB | 2 | (Brazil) Tchê Tchê |
| DM | 5 | (Brazil) Yuri |
| DM | 8 | (Brazil) Camacho (c) |
| LWB | 10 | (Brazil) Juninho | | (substituted off) 46' |
| RW | 7 | (Brazil) Mike |
| CF | 9 | (Brazil) Ytalo |
| LW | 8 | (Brazil) Bruno Paulo |
Substitutes:
| GK | 12 | (Brazil) Felipe Alves |
| MF | 13 | (Brazil) Felipe Diadema |
| DF | 14 | (Brazil) Bruno Lima |
| MF | 15 | (Brazil) Mauricio |
| MF | 16 | (Brazil) Renan |
| FW | 17 | (Brazil) Erick Luis |
| FW | 18 | (Brazil) Márcio Diogo |
| FW | 19 | (Brazil) Wellington | (yellow card) 75' | (substituted on) 46' |
| MF | 20 | (Brazil) Rodolfo |
| GK | 26 | (Brazil) Jefferson |
Manager:
(Brazil) Fernando Diniz

| GK | 1 | (Brazil) Vanderlei |
| RB | 4 | (Brazil) Victor Ferraz |
| CB | 14 | (Brazil) David Braz |
| CB | 6 | (Brazil) Gustavo Henrique | (yellow card) 86' |
| LB | 37 | (Brazil) Zeca |
| DM | 29 | (Brazil) Thiago Maia |
| DM | 8 | (Brazil) Renato |
| AM | 20 | (Brazil) Lucas Lima | (yellow card) 60' | (substituted off) 66' |
| RW | 18 | (Brazil) Vitor Bueno | | (substituted off) 74' |
| LW | 10 | (Brazil) Gabriel | | (substituted off) 89' |
| CF | 9 | (Brazil) Ricardo Oliveira (c) |
Substitutes:
| GK | 12 | (Brazil) Vladimir |
| DF | 2 | (Brazil) Luiz Felipe |
| DF | 3 | (Brazil) Caju |
| DF | 28 | (Brazil) Lucas Veríssimo |
| MF | 5 | (Brazil) Alison |
| MF | 11 | (Brazil) Elano |
| MF | 17 | (Brazil) Rafael Longuine |
| MF | 23 | (Brazil) Ronaldo Mendes | | (substituted on) 66' |
| MF | 41 | (Brazil) Serginho |
| FW | 26 | (Brazil) Paulinho | | (substituted on) 74' |
| FW | 30 | (Cameroon) Joel | | (substituted on) 89' |
| FW | 40 | (Brazil) Neto Berola |
Manager:
(Brazil) Dorival Júnior

May 8
16:00 (UTC−03)

| Santos | 1–0 | Audax |
|---|---|---|
| Ricardo Oliveira 45' | Report |

Vila Belmiro, Santos
Attendance: 16,018
Referee: Raphael Claus

| Santos | Audax |

| GK | 1 | (Brazil) Vanderlei |
| RB | 4 | (Brazil) Victor Ferraz | (yellow card) 3' |
| CB | 14 | (Brazil) David Braz |
| CB | 6 | (Brazil) Gustavo Henrique | (yellow card) 51' |
| LB | 37 | (Brazil) Zeca |
| DM | 29 | (Brazil) Thiago Maia | (yellow card) 54' |
| DM | 8 | (Brazil) Renato |
| AM | 20 | (Brazil) Lucas Lima | | (substituted off) 26' |
| RW | 18 | (Brazil) Vitor Bueno | | (substituted off) 67' |
| LW | 10 | (Brazil) Gabriel | (yellow card) 69' |
| CF | 9 | (Brazil) Ricardo Oliveira (c) | | (substituted off) 74' |
Substitutes:
| GK | 12 | (Brazil) Vladimir |
| DF | 3 | (Brazil) Caju |
| DF | 28 | (Brazil) Lucas Veríssimo |
| MF | 11 | (Brazil) Elano |
| MF | 17 | (Brazil) Rafael Longuine |
| MF | 21 | (Brazil) Leandrinho |
| MF | 23 | (Brazil) Ronaldo Mendes | | (substituted on) 67' |
| MF | 41 | (Brazil) Serginho |
| FW | 26 | (Brazil) Paulinho | | (substituted on) 26' |
| FW | 30 | (Cameroon) Joel | | (substituted on) 74' |
| FW | 31 | (Argentina) Maxi Rolón |
| FW | 40 | (Brazil) Neto Berola |
Manager:
(Brazil) Dorival Júnior

| GK | 1 | (Brazil) Sidão |
| CB | 6 | (Brazil) Francis | | (substituted off) 46' |
| CB | 3 | (Brazil) Bruno Silva | | (substituted off) 79' |
| CB | 4 | (Brazil) Velicka | (yellow card) 69' |
| RWB | 2 | (Brazil) Tchê Tchê |
| DM | 5 | (Brazil) Yuri |
| DM | 8 | (Brazil) Camacho (c) |
| LWB | 10 | (Brazil) Juninho | | (substituted off) 64' |
| RW | 7 | (Brazil) Mike |
| CF | 9 | (Brazil) Ytalo |
| LW | 8 | (Brazil) Bruno Paulo | (yellow card) 80' |
Substitutes:
| GK | 12 | (Brazil) Felipe Alves |
| MF | 13 | (Brazil) Felipe Diadema | | (substituted on) 79' |
| DF | 14 | (Brazil) Bruno Lima |
| MF | 15 | (Brazil) Mauricio |
| MF | 16 | (Brazil) Renan |
| FW | 17 | (Brazil) Erick Luis |
| FW | 18 | (Brazil) Márcio Diogo |
| FW | 19 | (Brazil) Wellington | | (substituted on) 64' |
| MF | 20 | (Brazil) Rodolfo | | (substituted on) 46' |
| GK | 26 | (Brazil) Jefferson |
Manager:
(Brazil) Fernando Diniz
