= Jefferson Paulino =

Brazilian footballer

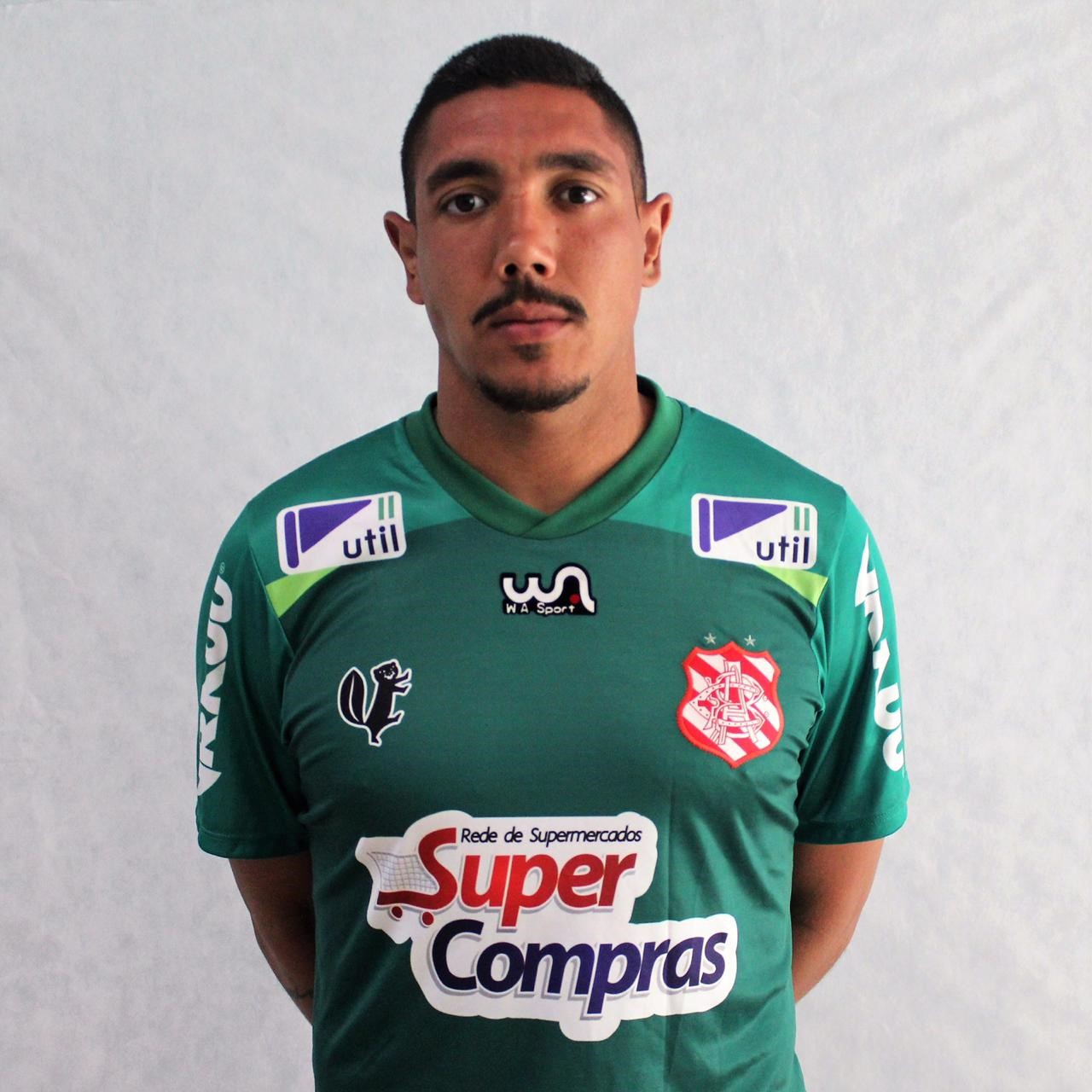
- Jefferson Paulino in 2019

Personal information
- Full name: Jefferson da Silva Paulino
- Date of birth: 15 November 1991 (age 34)
- Place of birth: São Paulo, Brazil
- Height: 1.85 m (6 ft 1 in)
- Position: Goalkeeper

Team information
- Current team: Retrô

Youth career
- Corinthians
- Atibaia
- 2007–2009: Juventus-SP
- 2010–2011: EC São Bernardo

Senior career*
Years	Team	Apps	(Gls)
2011–2012	EC São Bernardo	24	(0)
2013	Osasco FC	14	(0)
2013–2014	Grêmio Osasco	16	(0)
2014	→ Taboão da Serra (loan)	11	(0)
2015–2016	Audax	0	(0)
2016	→ Oeste (loan)	1	(0)
2017	Grêmio Osasco	19	(0)
2017–2018	Audax	10	(0)
2018	→ Audax Rio (loan)	6	(0)
2019	Bangu	13	(0)
2019	→ Guarani (loan)	12	(0)
2020	Guarani	23	(0)
2021	Inter de Limeira	7	(0)
2021	Brusque	5	(0)
2022	Santo André	12	(0)
2022	Ferroviária	14	(0)
2022	→ Ituano (loan)	14	(0)
2023–2025	Ituano	100	(0)
2025	Volta Redonda	14	(0)
2026–	Retrô	0	(0)
- * Club domestic league appearances and goals as of 19 December 2025

Jefferson da Silva Paulino (born 15 November 1991) is a Brazilian professional footballer who plays as a goalkeeper for Retrô.

== Club career ==
Paulino was born in São Paulo, and played for Corinthians, Atibaia, Juventus-SP and EC São Bernardo as a youth. He made his senior debut with the latter during the 2011 Campeonato Paulista Segunda Divisão, and moved to Osasco FC ahead of the 2013 season.

After playing for Grêmio Osasco and Taboão da Serra on loan, Paulino was a part of the Audax squad that finished second in the 2016 Campeonato Paulista, being a third-choice behind Felipe Alves and Sidão. He later represented Oeste in the 2016 Série B, being a backup to Felipe Alves as the club established a partnership with Audax.

On 19 January 2017, Paulino returned to Grêmio Osasco, but finished the year back at Audax in the Série D. In 2018, he was loaned to Audax Rio for the Campeonato Carioca Série B1, and signed for Bangu on 19 November of that year.

On 23 April 2019, Paulino was announced at Guarani, on loan from Bangu. He signed a permanent contract with the club for the 2020 campaign, and renewed his contract on 11 May of that year.

On 15 February 2021, Paulino agreed to a contract with Inter de Limeira. On 31 May, he moved to Brusque in the second division, but was mainly a backup option.

In November 2021, Paulino joined Santo André. Regularly used, he moved to Ferroviária the following 6 April, before being loaned to Ituano on 5 August.

On 12 December 2022, Paulino signed a permanent deal with Ituano, and was an undisputed starter in the club's 2023 Campeonato Paulista run.

== Career statistics ==
As of 20 March 2023

Club	Season	League			State League		Cup		Continental		Other		Total	
Club	Season	Division	Apps	Goals	Apps	Goals	Apps	Goals	Apps	Goals	Apps	Goals	Apps	Goals
São Bernardo	2011	Paulista 2ª Divisão	—		18	0	—		—		—		18	0
São Bernardo	2012	Paulista 2ª Divisão	—		6	0	—		—		—		6	0
São Bernardo	Subtotal		—		24	0	—		—		—		24	0
Osasco FC	2013	Paulista 2ª Divisão	—		14	0	—		—		—		14	0
Grêmio Osasco	2013	Paulista A3	—		0	0	—		—		1 (Note: Appearance(s) in Copa Paulista)	0	1	0
Grêmio Osasco	2014	Paulista A3	—		16	0	—		—		—		16	0
Grêmio Osasco	Subtotal		—		16	0	—		—		1	0	17	0
Taboão da Serra	2014	Paulista 2ª Divisão	—		11	0	—		—		—		11	0
Audax	2015	Paulista	—		0	0	—		—		0	0	0	0
Audax	2016	Série D	0	0	0	0	—		—		—		0	0
Audax	Subtotal		0	0	0	0	—		—		0	0	0	0
Oeste	2016	Série B	1	0	—		—		—		—		1	0
Grêmio Osasco	2017	Paulista A3	—		19	0	—		—		—		19	0
Audax	2017	Série D	1	0	—		—		—		8	0	9	0
Audax	2018	Paulista A2	—		9	0	—		—		—		9	0
Audax	Subtotal		1	0	9	0	—		—		8	0	18	0
Audax Rio	2018	Carioca Série B1	—		6	0	—		—		8 (Note: Appearance(s) in Copa Rio)	0	14	0
Bangu	2019	Carioca	—		13	0	—		—		—		13	0
Guarani	2019	Série B	12	0	—		—		—		—		12	0
Guarani	2020	Série B	8	0	15	0	—		—		—		23	0
Guarani	Subtotal		20	0	15	0	—		—		—		35	0
Inter de Limeira	2021	Série D	0	0	7	0	—		—		—		7	0
Brusque	2021	Série B	5	0	—		—		—		—		5	0
Santo André	2022	Série D	0	0	12	0	—		—		—		12	0
Ferroviária	2022	Série D	14	0	—		—		—		—		14	0
Ituano	2022	Série B	14	0	—		—		—		—		14	0
Ituano	2023	Série B	0	0	14	0	2	0	—		—		16	0
Ituano	Subtotal		14	0	14	0	2	0	—		—		30	0
Career total			55	0	160	0	2	0	0	0	17	0	234	0
