= Fernando Diniz =

Brazilian football manager (born 1974)

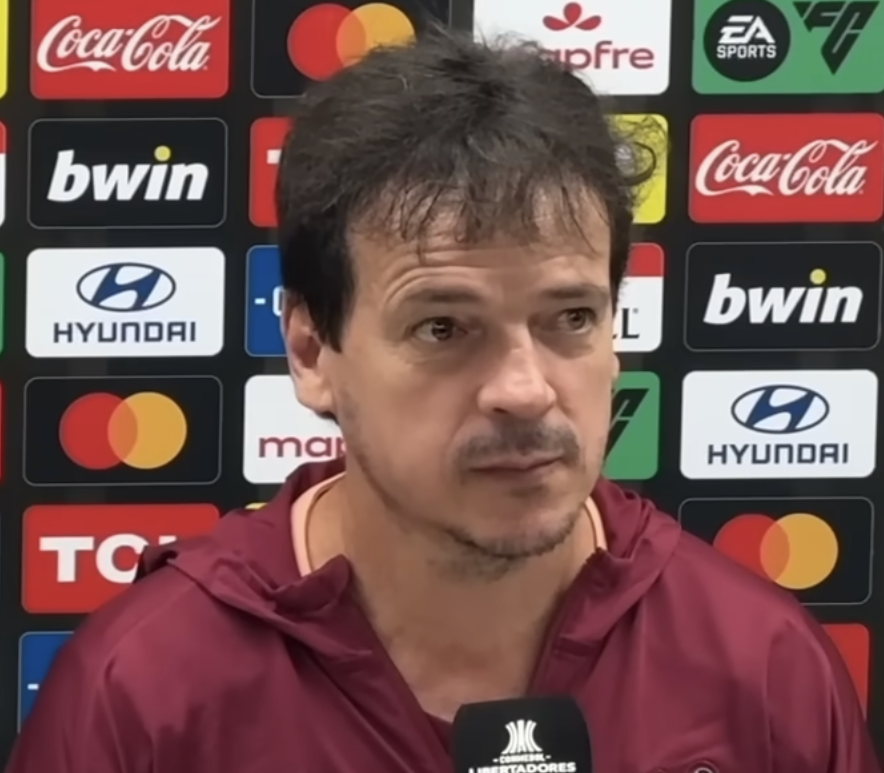
- Diniz during a post-match conference as Corinthians coach in 2026

Personal information
- Full name: Fernando Diniz Silva
- Date of birth: 27 March 1974 (age 52)
- Place of birth: Patos de Minas, Brazil
- Height: 1.83 m (6 ft 0 in)
- Position: Midfielder

Senior career*
Years	Team	Apps	(Gls)
1993–1996	Juventus-SP		
1995	→ Guarani (loan)	18	(3)
1996	Palmeiras	18	(1)
1997–1998	Corinthians	26	(0)
1998–2000	Paraná	52	(6)
2000–2003	Fluminense	72	(4)
2003	Flamengo	12	(1)
2004	Juventude	0	(0)
2004	Cruzeiro	8	(0)
2005	Santos	2	(0)
2006–2007	Paulista	19	(3)
2007	Santo André	17	(1)
2008	Juventus-SP	10	(0)
2008	Gama	1	(0)

Managerial career
- 2009–2010: Votoraty
- 2010: Paulista
- 2011: Botafogo-SP
- 2012: Atlético Sorocaba
- 2013–2014: Audax
- 2014: Guaratinguetá
- 2015: Audax
- 2015: Paraná
- 2016: Audax
- 2016: Oeste
- 2017: Audax
- 2018: Atlético Paranaense
- 2019: Fluminense
- 2019–2021: São Paulo
- 2021: Santos
- 2021: Vasco da Gama
- 2022–2024: Fluminense
- 2023–2024: Brazil (interim)
- 2024–2025: Cruzeiro
- 2025–2026: Vasco da Gama
- 2026: Corinthians
- * Club domestic league appearances and goals

Fernando Diniz Silva (born 27 March 1974) is a Brazilian professional football coach and former player who played as a midfielder. Post retirement as a professional athlete in 2008, Diniz graduated from the Universidade São Marcos in São Paulo. Where his final thesis would be "The importance of the coach's leadership in a football team".

Diniz is widely recognized in Brazil for his unique style of tactical structure, prioritizing ball control, playing out the back, and a position-less approach to attacking. A modern style influenced by Jogo Bonito. Initially compared to Pep Guardiola's tiki-taka, his style of play is described in Brazil as the Dinizismo, his own version of the relationism style of play.

== Early life and family ==
Diniz was born to Antônio da Silva Dias and Maria Diniz Silva in Patos de Minas, Brazil, on the 27th of March 1974. Diniz was the sixth child and grew up alongside several siblings. When Diniz was 10 months old, his family moved to Vila Ema, a neighborhood in eastern São Paulo in hopes to find better economic opportunities. When Diniz was 8 years old, his father passed away after suffering with Leukemia, which then he was raised by his single mother.

His Mother passed away in 2017 at the age of 76.

== Playing career ==
Born in Patos de Minas, Minas Gerais, Diniz started his career with Juventus-SP in 1993. In 1996, he moved to Guarani, but agreed to a contract with Palmeiras shortly after.

In 1997, Diniz moved to Palmeiras' fierce rivals Corinthians, featuring regularly during his two-year spell at the club. He subsequently represented Paraná, Fluminense, Flamengo, Juventude, Cruzeiro and Santos, all in the top tier.

In 2006, Diniz signed for Paulista, and later played for Santo André and Gama. He retired with the latter in 2008, aged 34.

== Coaching career ==
=== Early career ===
One year after retiring, Diniz was appointed head coach of lowly Votoraty, where he was crowned champions of both Copa Paulista and Campeonato Paulista Série A3. In 2010 he moved to Paulista, club he already represented as a player, and won another Copa Paulista with the side.

On 5 February 2011, Diniz was named Botafogo-SP head coach, but was fired after only four matches in charge. He was appointed at the helm of Atlético Sorocaba in 2012. Despite achieving promotion from the Campeonato Paulista Série A2, he was relieved from his duties in October of that year.

In 2013, Diniz joined Audax, and introduced the tiki-taka, style of Barcelona, in the club. On 8 July 2015 he moved to another club he represented as a player, Paraná.

Diniz returned to Audax for the 2016 Campeonato Paulista, which he managed to lead the side to the finals, but lost to Santos. Subsequently, he was appointed head coach of Oeste after a partnership between Oeste and Audax was established.

Diniz returned to Audax for a third spell in 2017, but suffered relegation.

=== Atlético Paranaense ===
Diniz only returned to managerial duties in the following season; after being announced as head coach of Guarani in November 2017, he signed with Atlético Paranaense in January 2018. He was dismissed from the team in June, being subsequently replaced by under-23 coach Tiago Nunes.

=== Fluminense ===
On 19 December 2018, Diniz was appointed head coach of another club he represented as a player, Fluminense. He was sacked by the club on 19 August 2019.

=== São Paulo ===
Diniz took over São Paulo on 27 September 2019. In the 2020 Série A, he led the club to a streak of 17 matches undefeated from September to December.

In January 2021, during a 2–4 loss to Red Bull Bragantino, Diniz had an argument with Tchê Tchê which led to strong media criticism due to his way of speaking to the player. On 1 February, after seven winless matches, he was sacked.

=== Santos ===
On 6 May 2021, Diniz agreed to a one-year contract with Santos, being officially named head coach the following day. On 5 September, after six matches without winning, he was sacked by Peixe.

=== Vasco da Gama ===
Four days after leaving Santos, Diniz was appointed at Vasco da Gama in the second division. He was dismissed on 11 November 2021, after failing to achieve promotion.

=== Fluminense return ===
Diniz returned to Fluminense on 30 April 2022, after Abel Braga resigned. He won the 2023 Campeonato Carioca with the club, his first major trophy as a head coach. He also led them to success in the 2023 Copa Libertadores by winning the final 2–1 against Boca Juniors.

On 24 June 2024, Diniz was dismissed from Flu after a poor performance in the 2024 Série A.

=== Brazil national team ===
On 4 July 2023, Diniz was appointed as interim head coach of the Brazil national team on a one-year deal. On 21 November, Brazil lost 1–0 to Argentina at the Maracanã Stadium, which was the nation's first-ever defeat at home in a World Cup qualification match.

On 5 January 2024, CBF president Ednaldo Rodrigues dismissed Diniz from his role as Brazil interim head coach.

=== Cruzeiro ===
On 23 September 2024, Diniz took over another club he represented as a player, Cruzeiro. He signed a contract until the end of 2025, and replaced sacked Fernando Seabra.

Heavily criticized due to the club's poor run after his arrival, Diniz was sacked on 27 January 2025, with just three matches into the new season. He left after seven defeats, seven draws and four wins in 18 matches.

=== Vasco da Gama return ===
On 9 May 2025, Diniz returned to Vasco on a contract until the end of 2026. He was sacked on 22 February of the following year, after a poor start of the new season.

=== Corinthians ===
On 6 April 2026, Diniz agreed to become the head coach of Corinthians, replacing Dorival Júnior. He was sacked on 7 October 2026 after a streak of seven consecutive losses in the Brasileirão.

== Personal Life ==
Marriage and children

Diniz is married and has children, although he generally keeps his immediate family away from media attention. Generally, his wife and family remain in the interior of São Paulo whilst his work as a coach requires him to move city to city to accompany his team alone, only returning to visit when permitted by his club. Diniz has publicly acknowledged the difficulty of managing his managerial responsibilities and family life. He has described it as one of the greatest sacrifices of his career.

Education and interest in psychology

Diniz developed and interest in education, human behavior and psychology from an early age. Following his retirement in 2008, Diniz enrolled in psychology, graduating in 2012 at the Universidade São Marcos, one of the most traditional schools for psychology in Brazil before its shutdown in 2013. Whilst studying, he also began his managerial career. His undergraduate thesis examined the methods and importance of how football managers develop players, particularly outside the field. His work emphasized treating athletes as individuals and preparing them for life outside of football.

Diniz has openly spoken about utilizing psychotherapy throughout his life, including after the death of his father and difficulties of his career.

Personal beliefs and philosophy

Diniz has often criticized the culture of modern football when it comes to managing players, describing what he considers the dehumanization of professional football. Specifically, how players are typically only valued for their performance. He has stated that players are treated as objects at clubs.

Although playing for many of the biggest clubs in Brazil, Diniz was unsatisfied, stating that the professional environment did not adequately adhere to the players' emotional and social needs

This has bled into his style of coaching and player managment, he has developed many close relationships with former players, and has succeeded in rehabilitating footballers who have struggled at previous clubs.

== Career statistics ==
Appearances and goals by club, season and competition
Club	Season	League			State League		Cup		Continental		Other		Total	
Club	Season	Division	Apps	Goals	Apps	Goals	Apps	Goals	Apps	Goals	Apps	Goals	Apps	Goals
Juventus-SP	1995	Série C	0	0	25	3	—		—		—		25	3
Juventus-SP	1996	Série C	0	0	26	2	—		—		—		26	2
Juventus-SP	Total		0	0	51	5	—		—		—		51	5
Guarani (loan)	1995	Série A	18	3	—		—		1 (Note: Appearance(s) in Copa CONMEBOL)	0	—		19	3
Palmeiras	1996	Série A	18	1	—		—		2	0	—		20	1
Corinthians	1997	Série A	12	0	10	0	3	0	—		—		25	0
Corinthians	1998	Série A	0	0	4	0	2	1	—		4 (Note: Appearance(s) in Torneio Rio – São Paulo)	0	10	1
Corinthians	Total		12	0	14	0	5	1	—		4	0	35	1
Paraná	1998	Série A	17	1	—		—		—		—		17	1
Paraná	1999	Série A	15	1	8	1	—		4	0	12 (Note: Appearance(s) in Copa Sul)	0	39	2
Paraná	2000	Série A	0	0	12	3	3	0	—		0	0	15	3
Paraná	Total		32	2	20	4	3	0	4	0	12	0	71	6
Fluminense	2000	Série A	14	2	—		—		—		—		14	2
Fluminense	2001	Série A	16	1	14	0	3	0	—		5	0	38	1
Fluminense	2002	Série A	18	1	4	0	5	2	—		15 (Note: 11 appearances and one goal in Torneio Rio – São Paulo, four appearances in Copa dos Campeões)	1	41	4
Fluminense	2003	Série A	1	0	5	0	2	0	—		—		8	0
Fluminense	Total		49	4	23	0	9	2	—		20	1	101	7
Flamengo	2003	Série A	12	1	—		—		—		—		12	1
Juventude	2004	Série A	0	0	0	0	0	0	—		—		0	0
Cruzeiro	2004	Série A	8	0	—		—		—		—		8	0
Santos	2005	Série A	0	0	2	0	—		2 (Note: Appearance(s) in Copa Libertadores)	0	—		4	0
Paulista	2006	Série B	5	2	—		—		—		—		5	2
Paulista	2007	Série B	0	0	14	1	—		—		—		14	1
Paulista	Total		5	2	14	1	—		—		—		19	3
Santo André	2007	Série B	17	1	—		—		—		—		17	1
Juventus-SP	2008	Paulista	—		10	0	—		—		—		10	0
Gama	2008	Série B	1	0	—		—		—		—		1	0
Career total			172	14	134	10	17	3	9	0	36	1	368	28

== Coaching statistics ==
As of 7 October 2026

Coaching record by team and tenure
Team	From	To	Record								Ref
Team	From	To	G	W	D	L	GF	GA	GD	Win %	Ref
Votoraty	12 January 2009	30 June 2010	77	38	17	22	129	90	+39	49.35	
Paulista	1 July 2010	3 February 2011	54	23	19	12	92	71	+21	42.59	
Botafogo-SP	4 February 2011	5 March 2011	4	1	0	3	5	10	−5	25.00	
Atlético Sorocaba	January 2012	17 October 2012	45	24	8	13	86	63	+23	53.33	
Audax	1 January 2013	25 April 2014	64	33	18	13	99	61	+38	51.56	
Guaratinguetá	25 April 2014	October 2014	18	6	7	5	32	18	+14	33.33	
Audax	October 2014	8 July 2015	15	6	4	5	23	19	+4	40.00	
Paraná	8 July 2015	27 September 2015	17	7	3	7	22	21	+1	41.18	
Audax	30 October 2015	16 May 2016	19	8	5	6	32	26	+6	42.11	
Oeste	16 May 2016	27 November 2016	37	9	16	12	34	45	−11	24.32	
Audax	27 November 2016	2 June 2017	14	3	4	7	18	22	−4	21.43	
Atlético Paranaense	3 January 2018	25 June 2018	21	5	7	9	25	27	−2	23.81	
Fluminense	19 December 2018	19 August 2019	44	18	11	15	71	48	+23	40.91	
São Paulo	27 September 2019	1 February 2021	77	35	21	21	120	89	+31	45.45	
Santos	7 May 2021	5 September 2021	27	10	7	10	29	29	+0	37.04	
Vasco da Gama	9 September 2021	11 November 2021	12	4	3	5	12	18	−6	33.33	
Fluminense	30 April 2022	24 June 2024	144	73	30	41	233	156	+77	50.69	
Brazil (Interim)	4 July 2023	5 January 2024	6	2	1	3	8	7	+1	33.33	
Cruzeiro	23 September 2024	27 January 2025	18	4	7	7	15	21	−6	22.22	
Vasco da Gama	9 May 2025	22 February 2026	54	17	15	22	73	72	+1	31.48	
Corinthians	6 April 2026	7 October 2026	33	13	8	12	36	32	+4	39.39	
Total			800	339	211	250	1,194	945	+249	42.38	—

== Honours ==
=== Player ===
Corinthians

- Campeonato Paulista: 1997

Fluminense

- Campeonato Carioca: 2002

=== Coach ===
Votoraty

- Copa Paulista: 2009
- Campeonato Paulista Série A3: 2009

Paulista

- Copa Paulista: 2010

Audax

- Campeonato Paulista: runner-up 2016

Fluminense

- Copa Libertadores: 2023
- Recopa Sudamericana: 2024
- Campeonato Carioca: 2023

Cruzeiro

- Copa Sudamericana: runner-up 2024

Vasco da Gama

- Copa do Brasil: runner-up 2025

Individual

- South American Coach of the Year: 2023
