= Wellington (footballer, born 1994) =

Brazilian footballer

Personal information
- Full name: Wellington Walter Nogueira
- Date of birth: 19 January 1994 (age 32)
- Place of birth: Boituva, Brazil
- Height: 1.78 m (5 ft 10 in)
- Position: Forward

Team information
- Current team: Jataiense

Youth career
- 2012: Atlético Sorocaba
- 2012–2013: Francana

Senior career*
Years	Team	Apps	(Gls)
2013	Francana	12	(4)
2013	Audax	0	(0)
2014–2015	Grêmio Osasco	21	(2)
2014	→ Guaratinguetá (loan)	2	(0)
2015–2017	Audax	0	(0)
2016	→ Oeste (loan)	12	(0)
2017	→ Grêmio Osasco (loan)	0	(0)
2017	Tombense	12	(0)
2018	URT	6	(0)
2019	Novo Horizonte	9	(0)
2019	Iporá	1	(0)
2019	Jataiense	8	(2)
2020	Jaraguá	6	(2)
2020	Capital CF	2	(0)
2020	Nacional-SP	5	(1)
2021	Audax	3	(0)
2021	Goianésia	8	(2)
2022	Juventus-SP	11	(0)
2022	Gaúcho	6	(0)
2022	Inter de Lages	8	(0)
2023	Iporá	10	(0)
2023–	Jataiense	10	(1)
- * Club domestic league appearances and goals as of 18:28, 16 October 2023 (UTC)

Wellington Walter Nogueira (born January 19, 1994, in Boituva), known as Wellington or by his nickname Boituva, is a Brazilian footballer who plays for Jataiense as forward. He played in 2016 for Oeste in the Brazilian Série B due to a partnership between Audax and Oeste.

== Career statistics ==
As of 9 January 2017

Appearances and goals by club, season and competition
Club	Season	League			State League		Cup		Conmebol		Other		Total	
Club	Season	Division	Apps	Goals	Apps	Goals	Apps	Goals	Apps	Goals	Apps	Goals	Apps	Goals
Francana	2013	Paulista A3	—		12	4	—		—		—		12	4
Audax	2013	Paulista A2	—		—		—		—		4 (Note: Appearance(s) in Copa Paulista)	0	4	0
Grêmio Osasco	2014	Paulista A2	—		8	0	—		—		11	3	19	3
Grêmio Osasco	2015	Paulista A3	—		13	2	—		—		—		13	2
Grêmio Osasco	Total		0	0	21	2	0	0	0	0	11	3	32	5
Guaratinguetá	2014	Série C	2	0	—		—		—		—		2	0
Audax	2015	Paulista	—		—		—		—		14	6	14	6
Audax	2016	Série D	—		8	1	—		—		—		8	1
Audax	Total		0	0	8	1	0	0	0	0	14	6	22	7
Oeste	2016	Série B	12	0	—		—		—		—		12	0
Career total			14	0	41	7	0	0	0	0	29	9	84	16
