= Ronaldo Mendes =

Brazilian footballer

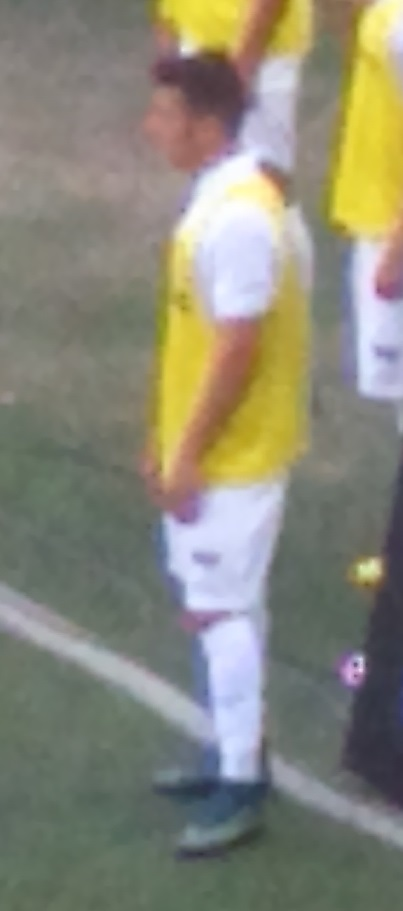
- Ronaldo Mendes warming up for Santos in 2016

Personal information
- Full name: Ronaldo César Mendes de Medeiros
- Date of birth: 16 August 1992 (age 34)
- Place of birth: Paial, Brazil
- Height: 1.71 m (5 ft 7 in)
- Position: Attacking midfielder

Team information
- Current team: Paysandu

Youth career
- Paraná

Senior career*
Years	Team	Apps	(Gls)
2010	Paraná	0	(0)
2011	Corinthians-AL	8	(0)
2012	CSA	9	(9)
2012	CRB	10	(1)
2013	Paraná	8	(2)
2013	→ Guarani (loan)	15	(4)
2014–2016	Comercial Viçosa	0	(0)
2014	→ Criciúma (loan)	1	(0)
2014	→ ABC (loan)	11	(1)
2015	→ Penapolense (loan)	10	(1)
2015	→ ABC (loan)	23	(3)
2016	→ Santos (loan)	10	(2)
2016–2021	Al Wasl	74	(16)
2018	→ Al-Fujairah (loan)	10	(0)
2021–2023	Çaykur Rizespor	12	(1)
2023–	Paysandu	0	(0)
- * Club domestic league appearances and goals as of 12 June 2023

Ronaldo César Mendes de Medeiros (born 16 August 1992), known as Ronaldo Mendes or simply Ronaldo, is a Brazilian professional footballer who plays as attacking midfielder for Chapecoense.

== Career ==
=== Early career ===
Born in Nova Erechim, Santa Catarina, Ronaldo was a Paraná Clube youth graduate, but after failing to make his breakthrough, he moved to Corinthians Alagoano in 2011. The following year, he joined CSA, and made his debut for the club on 24 June 2012 by starting and scoring a brace in a 3–1 home win against Vitória da Conquista.

Ronaldo scored four goals in a 5–0 home routing of Feirense on 12 August 2012. On 19 September, after scoring nine goals in nine matches, he signed for Série B side CRB.

Ronaldo made his professional debut on 22 September 2012, coming on as a half-time substitute and scoring his team's first in a 3–2 away loss against São Caetano. He finished the campaign with ten appearances, as his side suffered relegation.

In January 2013 Ronaldo moved to Guarani, on loan from Paraná. On 8 November, after struggling with injuries, he rescinded his contract.

On 13 December 2013, Ronaldo joined Botafogo-SP, but was released shortly after. On 1 August 2014, he signed a short-term deal with Criciúma in Série A, after being previously training with the club.

Ronaldo made his debut in the main category of Brazilian football on 17 August 2014, replacing Serginho in a 2–0 away loss against Grêmio. In September he rescinded his link, and moved to ABC.

After representing Penapolense in 2015 Campeonato Paulista, Ronaldo returned to ABC on 20 April 2015. He appeared regularly for the side, featuring in 23 matches and scoring three goals.

=== Santos ===
On 19 December 2015, Ronaldo signed a one-year deal with Santos. Initially assigned to the B-team, he was promoted to the main squad in the following month.

Ronaldo made his debut for Peixe on 6 February 2016, coming on as a second-half substitute and suffering a late penalty in a 2–1 home win against Ituano. On 10 April, again from the bench, he scored the winner in a home success over Audax for the same scoreline; he scored the equalizer against the same team in the first leg of the final, as his side was crowned champions in a 2–1 aggregate win.

=== Al-Wasl ===
On 7 July 2016, Ronaldo moved abroad for the first time in his career, joining Emirati club Al-Wasl.

== Career statistics ==
As of 1 November 2023

Appearances and goals by club, season and competition
Club	Season	League			State League		Cup		Continental		Other		Total	
Club	Season	Division	Apps	Goals	Apps	Goals	Apps	Goals	Apps	Goals	Apps	Goals	Apps	Goals
Corinthians-AL	2011	Alagoano	—		8	0	—		—		—		8	0
CSA	2012	Série D	9	9	—		—		—		—		9	9
CRB	2012	Série B	10	1	—		—		—		—		10	1
Guarani	2013	Série C	—		15	4	—		—		—		15	4
Paraná	2013	Série B	8	2	—		—		—		—		8	2
Criciúma	2014	Série A	1	0	—		—		—		—		1	0
ABC	2014	Série B	11	1	—		—		—		—		11	1
Penapolense	2015	Paulista	—		10	1	—		—		—		10	1
ABC	2015	Série B	23	3	—		2	0	—		—		25	3
Santos	2016	Série A	4	0	6	2	2	1	—		—		12	3
Al Wasl	2016–17	UAE Pro League	25	9	—		6	0	—		—		31	9
Al Wasl	2017–18	UAE Pro League	19	2	—		9	3	6 (Note: Appearance(s) in AFC Champions League)	0	—		34	5
Al Wasl	2018–19	UAE Pro League	7	2	—		2	0	4 (Note: Two appearances in AFC Champions League and two appearances in Arab Club Champions Cup)	0	—		11	2
Al Wasl	2019–20	UAE Pro League	0	0	—		0	0	0	0	—		0	0
Al Wasl	2020–21	UAE Pro League	23	3	—		4	0	0	0	—		27	3
Al Wasl	Total		75	16	—		21	3	10	0	—		106	19
Al-Fujairah	2018–19	UAE Pro League	10	0	—		3	0	—		—		13	0
Rizespor	2021–22	Süper Lig	12	1	—		—		—		—		12	1
Rizespor	2022–23	Süper Lig	0	0	—		2	0	—		—		2	0
Rizespor	Total		12	1	—		2	0	—		—		14	1
Paysandu	2023	Série C	9	1	—		—		—		—		9	1
Career total			172	34	39	7	30	4	10	0	0	0	251	45

== Honours ==
Santos

- Campeonato Paulista: 2016
