= Velicka (footballer) =

Brazilian footballer

Personal information
- Full name: Leandro Nunes Velicka
- Date of birth: 26 February 1986 (age 40)
- Place of birth: São Paulo, Brazil
- Height: 1.77 m (5 ft 10 in)
- Positions: Defender; midfielder

Senior career*
| Years | Team | Apps | (Gls) |
| 2007 | Grêmio Barueri | 0 | (0) |
| 2008 | Tupi | | |
| 2008 | Monte Azul | | |
| 2008 | Tupy–GO | 8 | (2) |
| 2009 | Monte Azul | 19 | (8) |
| 2009–2010 | Mirassol | 4 | (1) |
| 2010 | Atlético Sorocaba | 8 | (3) |
| 2010 | Linense | 0 | (0) |
| 2011 | São José-SP | 20 | (2) |
| 2011 | Comercial-SP | 0 | (0) |
| 2012 | Noroeste | 23 | (3) |
| 2013–2017 | Audax | 0 | (0) |
| 2014 | → Guaratinguetá (loan) | 14 | (5) |
| 2016 | → Oeste (loan) | 16 | (0) |
| 2017 | → Oeste (loan) | 19 | (1) |
| 2018 | Ferroviária | 11 | (1) |
| 2018 | CSA | 5 | (0) |
| 2019 | Brasil de Pelotas | 0 | (0) |
| 2019 | Taubaté | 0 | (0) |
| 2020 | Água Santa | 0 | (0) |
- * Club domestic league appearances and goals as of 21:31, 6 July 2019 (UTC)

Leandro Nunes Velicka (born February 26, 1986, in São Paulo), commonly known as Velicka, is a Brazilian footballer.

He can play in multiple roles such as a right or left back, and defensive or a centre midfielder.

== Career ==
Velicka played in 2016 for Oeste in the Brazilian Série B due to a partnership between Audax and Oeste.

== Career statistics ==
As of 22 April 2019

| Club | Season | League | | | State League | | Cup | | Conmebol | | Other | | Total | |
| Club | Season | Division | Apps | Goals | Apps | Goals | Apps | Goals | Apps | Goals | Apps | Goals | Apps | Goals |
|---|---|---|---|---|---|---|---|---|---|---|---|---|---|---|
| Grêmio Barueri | 2007 | Série B | — | | — | | — | | — | | 9 (Note: All appearance(s) in Copa Paulista) | 3 | 9 | 3 |
| Tupy-GO | 2008 | Goiano 2ª Divisão | — | | 8 | 2 | — | | — | | — | | 8 | 2 |
| Monte Azul | 2009 | Paulista A2 | — | | 19 | 8 | — | | — | | — | | 19 | 8 |
| Mirassol | 2009 | Série D | 4 | 1 | — | | — | | — | | 10 | 1 | 14 | 2 |
| Mirassol | 2010 | Paulista | — | | 2 | 0 | — | | — | | — | | 2 | 0 |
| Mirassol | Subtotal | | 4 | 1 | 2 | 0 | — | | — | | 10 | 1 | 16 | 2 |
| Atlético Sorocaba | 2010 | Paulista A2 | — | | 8 | 3 | — | | — | | — | | 8 | 3 |
| Linense | 2010 | Paulista A2 | — | | — | | — | | — | | 19 | 4 | 19 | 4 |
| São José-SP | 2011 | Paulista A2 | — | | 20 | 2 | — | | — | | — | | 20 | 2 |
| Comercial-SP | 2011 | Paulista A2 | — | | — | | — | | — | | 17 | 0 | 17 | 0 |
| Noroeste | 2012 | Paulista A2 | — | | 23 | 3 | — | | — | | 22 | 3 | 23 | 3 |
| Audax | 2013 | Paulista A2 | — | | 22 | 2 | — | | — | | 22 | 1 | 44 | 3 |
| Audax | 2014 | Paulista | — | | 15 | 3 | — | | — | | — | | 15 | 3 |
| Audax | 2015 | Paulista | — | | 0 | 0 | — | | — | | 2 | 0 | 2 | 0 |
| Audax | 2016 | Série D | 0 | 0 | 13 | 2 | — | | — | | — | | 13 | 2 |
| Audax | 2017 | Série D | 0 | 0 | 4 | 1 | 1 | 0 | — | | — | | 5 | 1 |
| Audax | Subtotal | | 0 | 0 | 54 | 8 | 1 | 0 | — | | 24 | 1 | 79 | 9 |
| Guaratinguetá (loan) | 2014 | Série C | 14 | 5 | — | | — | | — | | — | | 14 | 5 |
| Oeste (loan) | 2016 | Série B | 16 | 0 | — | | — | | — | | — | | 16 | 0 |
| Oeste (loan) | 2017 | Série B | 19 | 1 | — | | — | | — | | — | | 19 | 1 |
| Ferroviária | 2018 | Paulista | — | | 11 | 1 | — | | — | | — | | 11 | 1 |
| CSA | 2018 | Série B | 5 | 0 | — | | 0 | 0 | — | | — | | 5 | 0 |
| Brasil de Pelotas | 2019 | Série B | 0 | 0 | 5 | 0 | 0 | 0 | — | | — | | 5 | 0 |
| Career total | | | 58 | 7 | 150 | 27 | 1 | 0 | 0 | 0 | 101 | 12 | 310 | 46 |
