= Felipe Rodrigues =

Brazilian footballer (born 1995)

Personal information
- Full name: Felipe Rodrigues dos Santos
- Date of birth: 31 October 1995 (age 31)
- Place of birth: São Paulo, Brazil
- Height: 1.83 m (6 ft 0 in)
- Position: Right-back

Team information
- Current team: Ferroviária
- Number: 22

Youth career
- 2004–2013: Diadema
- 2013–2015: Paulista

Senior career*
Years	Team	Apps	(Gls)
2013	Diadema	6	(0)
2014–2015	Paulista	14	(2)
2016–2018	Audax	19	(3)
2016	→ Oeste (loan)	26	(1)
2017	→ Santos (loan)	0	(0)
2018	→ Sport Recife (loan)	6	(0)
2018	→ Guarani (loan)	10	(1)
2019	Vila Nova	23	(0)
2020–2022	Novorizontino	54	(5)
2022–2024	Vorskla Poltava	35	(4)
2025	Noroeste	7	(1)
2026–	Ferroviária	18	(1)
- * Club domestic league appearances and goals as of 9 November 2026

Felipe Rodrigues dos Santos (born 31 October 1995), known as Felipe Diadema or Felipe Rodrigues, is a Brazilian footballer who plays for Ferroviária. Mainly a right back, he can also play as a central defender or defensive midfielder.

== Club career ==
Born in São Paulo, Felipe finished his formation with Paulista, although first appearing as a senior for Clube Atlético Diadema in the 2013 season. He made his first team debut for the former on 5 March 2014, coming on as a half-time substitute in a 2–1 Campeonato Paulista away loss against Oeste; thirteen days later he scored his first senior goal, netting the first in a 4–4 draw at Mogi Mirim.

On 10 December 2015, Felipe signed for Audax. Mainly a backup, he appeared in eight matches during the 2016 Campeonato Paulista, scoring a bicycle kick goal against Água Santa on 21 February.

Felipe represented Oeste on loan in the 2016 Série B, after a partnership with Audax was established. On 25 May 2017, he was loaned to Santos for one year, being initially assigned to the B-team.

On 8 January 2018, Felipe was loaned to fellow top tier club Sport for one year.

On 3 July 2018, Felipe joined Série B side Guarani on loan until the end of the season.

== Career statistics ==
As of 3 November 2020

Club	Season	League			State League		Cup		Continental		Other		Total	
Club	Season	Division	Apps	Goals	Apps	Goals	Apps	Goals	Apps	Goals	Apps	Goals	Apps	Goals
Diadema	2013	Paulista 2ª Divisão	—		6	0	—		—		—		6	0
Paulista	2014	Paulista	—		3	1	—		—		14 (Note: All appearance(s) in Copa Paulista)	0	17	1
Paulista	2015	Paulista A2	—		11	1	—		—		11	1	22	2
Paulista	Total		—		14	2	—		—		25	1	39	3
Audax	2016	Série D	0	0	8	1	—		—		—		8	1
Audax	2017	Série D	0	0	11	2	2	0	—		—		13	2
Audax	Total		0	0	19	3	2	0	—		—		21	3
Oeste (loan)	2016	Série B	26	1	—		—		—		—		26	1
Santos (loan)	2017	Série A	0	0	—		—		—		17	1	17	1
Sport Recife (loan)	2018	Série A	0	0	5	0	1	0	—		0	0	6	0
Guarani (loan)	2018	Série B	10	1	—		—		—		—		10	1
Vila Nova	2019	Série B	13	0	6	0	4	0	—		—		23	0
Novorizontino	2020	Série D	8	1	2	0	0	0	—		—		10	1
Career total			44	3	46	5	3	0	0	0	41	1	134	9
