= Guilherme Camacho =

Brazilian footballer (born 1990)

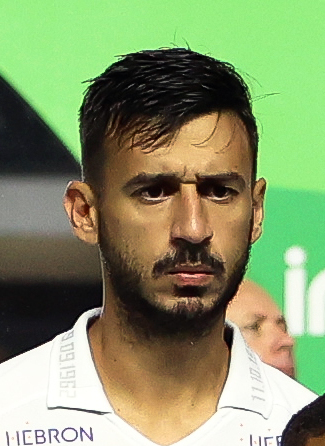
- Camacho in 2022

Personal information
- Full name: Guilherme de Aguiar Camacho
- Date of birth: 2 March 1990 (age 36)
- Place of birth: Rio de Janeiro, Brazil
- Height: 1.81 m (5 ft 11 in)
- Position: Midfielder

Team information
- Current team: CSA

Youth career
- Madureira
- 1999–2008: Flamengo

Senior career*
Years	Team	Apps	(Gls)
2008–2014	Flamengo	23	(2)
2008	→ Paraná (loan)	4	(0)
2010	→ Goiás (loan)	3	(0)
2011	→ Bahia (loan)	31	(4)
2013	→ Audax Rio (loan)	6	(0)
2014	→ Audax (loan)	13	(1)
2014–2016	Audax	32	(2)
2014	→ Guaratinguetá (loan)	16	(3)
2015	→ Botafogo (loan)	17	(0)
2016–2021	Corinthians	95	(2)
2018	→ Atlético Paranaense (loan)	19	(1)
2019	→ Athletico Paranaense (loan)	11	(0)
2021–2023	Santos	81	(1)
2024	Guarani	10	(0)
2025–	CSA	0	(0)
- * Club domestic league appearances and goals as of 14:15, 4 December 2023 (UTC)

Guilherme de Aguiar Camacho (born 2 March 1990), sometimes known as just Camacho, is a Brazilian footballer who plays as a midfielder for CSA.

== Career ==
=== Flamengo ===
Born in Rio de Janeiro, Camacho joined Flamengo's youth setup at the age of nine, from Madureira. In August 2008, he was loaned to Série B side Paraná until the end of the year, as a part of the deal which saw Éverton move in the opposite direction permanently.

Camacho made his professional debut on 11 October 2008, coming on as a substitute for Giuliano in a 1–1 away draw against Juventude. After three further appearances, he returned to Fla for the 2009 campaign.

Camacho made his first team debut with Flamengo on 15 July 2009, replacing Zé Roberto late into a 1–2 home loss against Palmeiras for the Série A championship. He scored his first goal for the club the following 4 April, netting his team's third in a 3–0 away win against Friburguense.

On 24 September 2010, after being rarely used, Camacho was loaned to Goiás until December. On 31 December, he was announced at Bahia also in a temporary deal.

After featuring regularly for Bahia, Camacho was called back to Flamengo for the 2012 pre-season, but was again rarely used by the club. In 2013, he represented Audax Rio on loan, before playing for Grêmio Osasco Audax in the 2014 campaign.

=== Audax ===
After leaving Flamengo, Camacho subsequently had a short period at Guaratinguetá before signing permanently with Audax for the 2015 campaign. He was a regular starter in the 2015 Campeonato Paulista, and joined Botafogo on 4 May of that year, on loan until December.

Camacho helped Bota to achieve promotion to the top tier as champions with 17 appearances, and returned to Audax for the 2016 Paulistão. In the latter competition, he was an undisputed starter as Audax reached the Finals for the first time ever.

=== Corinthians ===
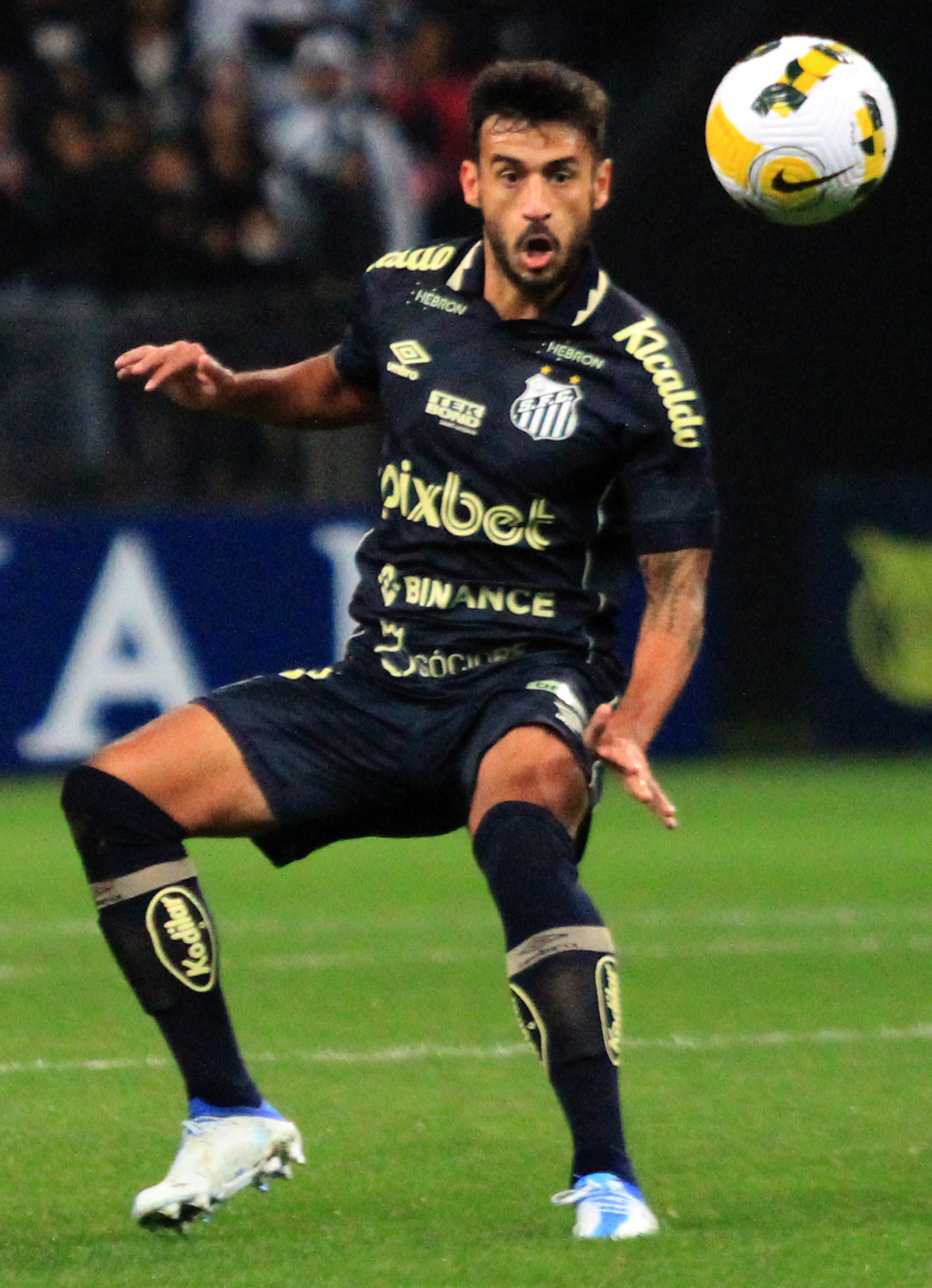
Camacho with Santos in 2022

On 23 May 2016, Camacho signed a three-year contract with Corinthians. He made his debut for the club on 17 June, in a 0–1 loss against Fluminense, and scored his first goal on 16 November by netting the opener in a 1–1 draw at Figueirense.

Camacho was a part of the squad which won the 2017 Paulista, the 2017 Série A and 2018 Paulista, but was mainly used as a substitute. On 24 February 2018, he moved to Atlético Paranaense on loan until the end of the year, with Sidcley moving in the opposite direction.

Camacho's loan with Athletico was renewed for a further year on 4 January 2019, but saw his playing time being reduced during the campaign. He confirmed his return to Corinthians for the 2020 season on 10 December.

On 4 February 2020, Camacho renewed his contract with Timão until December 2022. On 14 June of the following year, he terminated his contract with the club.

=== Santos ===
On 15 June 2021, Camacho signed a contract with Santos until December 2022. He made his debut for the club two days later, replacing Danilo Boza in a 0–1 away loss against Fluminense.

On 22 September 2022, Camacho renewed with Peixe until 2023. He scored his first goal for the club on 17 October, netting the opener in a 2–0 away win over Red Bull Bragantino.

Camacho played his 100th match for Santos on 8 October 2023, a 2–1 away win over Palmeiras.

== Career statistics ==
As of 4 December 2023

Club	Season	League			State League		Cup		Continental		Other		Total	
Club	Season	Division	Apps	Goals	Apps	Goals	Apps	Goals	Apps	Goals	Apps	Goals	Apps	Goals
Flamengo	2008	Série A	0	0	0	0	0	0	—		—		0	0
Flamengo	2009	Série A	9	0	0	0	0	0	1 (Note: Appearance(s) in Copa Sudamericana)	0	—		10	0
Flamengo	2010	Série A	6	0	1	1	0	0	—		—		7	1
Flamengo	2012	Série A	3	0	4	1	—		3 (Note: Appearance(s) in Copa Libertadores)	0	—		10	1
Flamengo	Total		18	0	5	2	0	0	4	0	—		27	2
Paraná (loan)	2008	Série B	4	0	—		—		—		—		4	0
Goiás (loan)	2010	Série A	3	0	—		—		—		—		3	0
Bahia (loan)	2011	Série A	13	1	18	3	6	1	—		—		37	5
Audax Rio	2013	Carioca	—		6	0	—		—		12 (Note: Appearance(s) in Copa Rio)	1	18	1
Audax	2014	Paulista	—		13	1	—		—		—		13	1
Audax	2015	Paulista	—		14	0	—		—		—		14	0
Audax	2016	Série D	0	0	18	2	—		—		—		18	2
Audax	Total		0	0	45	3	—		—		—		45	3
Guaratinguetá (loan)	2014	Série C	16	3	—		—		—		—		16	3
Botafogo (loan)	2015	Série B	17	0	—		1	0	—		—		18	0
Corinthians	2016	Série A	17	1	—		4	0	—		—		21	1
Corinthians	2017	Série A	27	0	10	0	2	0	6	0	—		45	0
Corinthians	2018	Série A	0	0	4	0	0	0	—		—		4	0
Corinthians	2020	Série A	20	0	10	0	0	0	2	0	—		32	0
Corinthians	2021	Série A	2	0	5	1	2	0	5	0	—		14	1
Corinthians	Total		66	1	29	1	8	0	13	0	—		116	2
Athletico Paranaense (loan)	2018	Série A	19	1	—		4	0	2	0	—		25	1
Athletico Paranaense (loan)	2019	Série A	11	0	—		0	0	5	0	—		16	0
Athletico Paranaense (loan)	Total		30	1	—		4	0	7	0	—		41	1
Santos	2021	Série A	30	0	—		—		4	0	—		34	0
Santos	2022	Série A	26	1	11	0	5	0	4	0	—		46	1
Santos	2023	Série A	11	0	3	0	4	0	3	0	—		21	0
Santos	Total		67	1	14	0	9	0	11	0	—		101	1
Career total			234	7	117	9	28	1	35	0	12	1	426	18

== Honours ==
=== Club ===
Flamengo

- Campeonato Brasileiro Série A: 2009

Botafogo

- Campeonato Brasileiro Série B: 2015

Corinthians

- Campeonato Brasileiro Série A: 2017
- Campeonato Paulista: 2017, 2018

Athletico Paranaense

- Copa Sudamericana: 2018

=== Individual ===
- Campeonato Paulista Team of the year: 2016
