= Bruno Paulo =

Brazilian footballer (born 1990)

Personal information
- Full name: Bruno Paulo Machado Barbosa
- Date of birth: 14 February 1990 (age 36)
- Place of birth: Rio de Janeiro, Brazil
- Height: 1.82 m (6 ft 0 in)
- Position: Forward

Youth career
- 2002–2009: Flamengo

Senior career*
| Years | Team | Apps | (Gls) |
| 2009 | Flamengo | 4 | (0) |
| 2010–2012 | Desportivo Brasil | 0 | (0) |
| 2010 | → Palmeiras (loan) | 1 | (0) |
| 2010 | → Vasco da Gama (loan) | 4 | (1) |
| 2011 | → Bahia (loan) | 7 | (1) |
| 2012 | → Atlético Paranaense (loan) | 0 | (0) |
| 2013 | Santo André | 14 | (1) |
| 2013 | Lajeadense | 4 | (1) |
| 2014 | Red Bull Brasil | 18 | (2) |
| 2014 | Guaratinguetá | 11 | (2) |
| 2015–2016 | Audax | 25 | (6) |
| 2016–2019 | Corinthians | 1 | (0) |
| 2017 | → Santa Cruz (loan) | 25 | (3) |
| 2018 | → CRB (loan) | 9 | (1) |
| 2019 | → Brasil de Pelotas (loan) | 19 | (2) |
| 2019 | Kazma | 0 | (0) |
| 2020 | Guarani | 1 | (0) |
| 2021 | Rayong | 7 | (0) |
- * Club domestic league appearances and goals as of 22:50, 9 January 2021 (UTC)

Bruno Paulo Machado Barbosa (born 14 February 1990), known as Bruno Paulo, is a Brazilian footballer who plays as a forward.

== Club career ==
Bruno Paulo was born in Rio de Janeiro. A Flamengo youth graduate, he made his first team – and Série A debut on 22 July 2009, coming in as a second-half substitute for fellow youngster Jorbison in a 1–1 home draw against Grêmio Barueri.

Bruno Paulo appeared in four first-team matches before leaving Flamengo in December 2009, due to a contract dispute. After having his federative rights acquired by Traffic Group, he was assigned to Desportivo Brasil and subsequently loaned to Palmeiras, Vasco da Gama, Bahia and Atlético Paranaense, appearing rarely for all of those clubs.

After being released by Traffic, Bruno Paulo represented Santo André, Lajeadense and Red Bull Brasil, only being a regular starter at the latter. On 22 May 2014 he joined Osasco Audax, being immediately loaned to Guaratinguetá.

He signed with Corinthians on 24 May 2016.

== Honours ==
Flamengo

- Campeonato Brasileiro Série A: 2009

Individual

- December player in the Iraqi Premier League: 2022–23
