= Andre Castro =

Andre Castro may refer to:

- André Castro (born 1988), Portuguese football midfielder
- André Castro (footballer, born 1991), Brazilian football right-back
- Andre Castro (racing driver) (born 1999), American racing driver
