= Sidão (footballer) =

Brazilian footballer

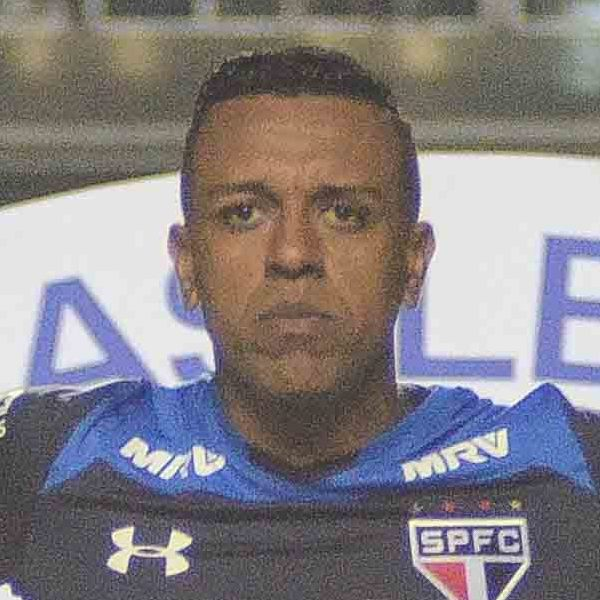
- Sidão with São Paulo in 2018

Personal information
- Full name: Sidney Aparecido Ramos da Silva
- Date of birth: 24 December 1982 (age 43)
- Place of birth: São Paulo, Brazil
- Height: 1.89 m (6 ft 2 1/2 in)
- Position: Goalkeeper

Youth career
- Corinthians

Senior career*
Years	Team	Apps	(Gls)
2001–2003	Corinthians B	10	(0)
2003	Juventus-SP	20	(0)
2004–2008	Taboão da Serra	30	(0)
2005	→ Sampaio Corrêa (loan)	10	(0)
2008	União Mogi	11	(0)
2009–2010	Rio Claro	25	(0)
2010	Luverdense	13	(0)
2010–2011	Grêmio Prudente	8	(0)
2012	Rio Claro	10	(0)
2012–2016	Audax	36	(0)
2014	→ Guaratinguetá (loan)	4	(0)
2015	→ Audax Rio (loan)	0	(0)
2016	→ Botafogo (loan)	32	(0)
2017–2019	São Paulo	46	(0)
2019–2021	Goiás	19	(0)
2019	→ Vasco da Gama (loan)	7	(0)
2020–2021	→ Figueirense (loan)	29	(0)
2022	Concórdia	1	(0)
2022–2023	Atlético Catarinense	23	(0)
2023	Concórdia	13	(0)
2024	Azuriz	1	(0)
2024	Paraná	11	(0)
2025–	Sobradinho		
- * Club domestic league appearances and goals as of 27 July 2024

Sidney Aparecido Ramos da Silva (born 24 December 1982), commonly known as Sidão, is a Brazilian professional footballer who plays as a goalkeeper.

== Club career ==
Born in São Paulo, Sidão was a Corinthians youth graduate. After failing to appear with the main squad, he would spend the most of his career playing mainly for lower sides in the same state.

=== Audax ===
On 28 June 2012 Sidão joined Audax. With the side he was mainly used as a backup, but after the injury of the starter Felipe Alves in 2016, he was promoted as first-choice and appeared regularly as his club reached the Campeonato Paulista finals for the first time in its history.

==== Botafogo (loan) ====
On 24 May 2016, Sidão was loaned to Botafogo until the end of the year.

=== São Paulo ===
On 24 November 2016, Sidão signed a two-year contract with São Paulo. Sidão would be a key player for São Paulo in 2017 Florida Cup. He defended four penalties, two ones at semifinals against Argentine side River Plate and two other ones at final against fierce rivals Corinthians. He felt herself impressed after figuring out he broke Rogério Ceni's, his coach, record: Ceni defended two penalties in his two first matches for Tricolor. This way, São Paulo won 2017 Florida Cup, and Sidão was considered best player on final.

=== Goiás ===
On 13 December 2018 Goiás signed a one-year contract with Sidão, on a free transfer. In March 2019, he drew controverse after saying that his move to Goiás was a step down on his career.

==== Vasco da Gama (loan) ====
On 4 May 2019, Sidão joined Vasco da Gama on a loan deal to replace the injured goalkeeper Fernando Miguel. On 12 May, after a bad performance in a 3–0 loss against Santos, he was ironically voted as the Man of the Match with near 90% of the votes in an open online poll led by Rede Globo, being awarded a trophy afterwards. The prank was followed by sympathy from professional footballers, clubs and former footballers, leading to a public apology from the television network.

== Honours ==
São Paulo

- Florida Cup: 2017

Paraná

- Campeonato Paranaense Série Prata: 2024
