= Felipe Alves (footballer, born 1988) =

Brazilian footballer

Personal information
- Full name: Felipe Alves Raymundo
- Date of birth: 21 May 1988 (age 38)
- Place of birth: São Paulo, Brazil
- Height: 1.87 m (6 ft 2 in)
- Position: Goalkeeper

Team information
- Current team: Santa Cruz

Youth career
- Paulista

Senior career*
Years	Team	Apps	(Gls)
2009–2012	Paulista	22	(0)
2011	→ Vitória (loan)	2	(0)
2012–2013	Atlético Sorocaba	30	(0)
2014–2018	Audax	59	(0)
2014	→ Guaratinguetá (loan)	14	(0)
2015	→ Paraná (loan)	10	(0)
2016	→ Oeste (loan)	36	(0)
2017	→ Oeste (loan)	2	(0)
2018	Atlético Paranaense	6	(0)
2019–2023	Fortaleza	89	(0)
2022	→ Juventude (loan)	1	(0)
2022–2023	→ São Paulo (loan)	17	(0)
2024	Fluminense	0	(0)
2025	Noroeste	0	(0)
2025–	Santa Cruz	0	(0)
- * Club domestic league appearances and goals as of 15 March 2023

Felipe Alves Raymundo (born 21 May 1988), known as Felipe Alves, is a Brazilian professional footballer who plays for Santa Cruz, as a goalkeeper.

== Club career ==
Born in São Paulo, Felipe Alves finished his formation with Paulista. He made his first team debut on 28 March 2009, coming on as a half-time substitute in a 0–0 Campeonato Paulista away draw against Ituano.

Felipe Alves became a starter for the 2009 Campeonato Brasileiro Série D, and remained a first-choice in the following years. On 17 June 2011, he was loaned to Série B side Vitória until the end of the year.

On 8 December 2011, Felipe Alves moved to Atlético Sorocaba. Ahead of the 2014 season, he joined Audax, featuring regularly.

Felipe Alves served loan stints at Guaratinguetá, Paraná and Oeste, all of them managed by Fernando Diniz. On 2 February 2018, he agreed to a one-year deal with Atlético Paranaense in the Série A, again reuniting with Diniz.

On 3 June 2018, aged 30, Felipe Alves made his debut in the main category of Brazilian football, starting in a 3–1 defeat at América Mineiro.

== Career statistics ==
As of 13 November 2022.

Appearances and goals by club, season and competition
Club	Season	League			State League		Cup		Continental		Other		Total	
Club	Season	Division	Apps	Goals	Apps	Goals	Apps	Goals	Apps	Goals	Apps	Goals	Apps	Goals
Paulista	2009	Paulista	—		3	0	—		—		—		3	0
Paulista	2010	Paulista	—		11	0	—		—		—		11	0
Paulista	2011	Paulista	—		8	0	2	0	—		—		10	0
Paulista	Total		—		22	0	2	0	—		—		24	0
Vitória (loan)	2011	Série B	2	0	—		—		—		—		2	0
Atlético Sorocaba	2012	Paulista	—		24	0	—		—		—		24	0
Atlético Sorocaba	2013	Paulista	—		6	0	—		—		—		6	0
Atlético Sorocaba	Total		—		30	0	—		—		—		30	0
Audax	2013	Paulista	—		—		—		—		21	0	21	0
Audax	2014	Paulista	—		14	0	—		—		—		14	0
Audax	2015	Paulista	—		14	0	—		—		—		14	0
Audax	2016	Série D	—		10	0	—		—		—		10	0
Audax	2017	Série D	5	0	12	0	2	0	—		2	0	21	0
Audax	2018	Paulista	—		3	0	—		—		—		3	0
Audax	Total		5	0	53	0	2	0	—		23	0	83	0
Guaratinguetá (loan)	2014	Série C	14	0	—		—		—		—		14	0
Paraná (loan)	2015	Série B	10	0	—		—		—		—		10	0
Oeste (loan)	2016	Série B	36	0	—		—		—		—		36	0
Oeste (loan)	2017	Série B	2	0	—		—		—		—		2	0
Atlético Paranaense	2018	Série A	6	0	—		0	0	0	0	—		6	0
Fortaleza	2019	Série A	32	0	10	0	1	0	2	0	0	0	45	0
Fortaleza	2020	Série A	37	0	7	0	1	0	—		10	0	55	0
Fortaleza	2021	Série A	20	0	8	0	6	0	—		8	0	42	0
Fortaleza	Total		89	0	25	0	8	0	2	0	18	0	142	0
Juventude (loan)	2022	Série A	1	0	0	0	2	0	—		—		3	0
São Paulo (loan)	2022	Série A	17	0	—		—		4	0	—		21	0
São Paulo (loan)	2023	Série A	0	0	0	0	0	0	0	0	—		0	0
São Paulo (loan)	Total		17	0	0	0	0	0	4	0	—		21	0
Career total			182	0	130	0	14	0	6	0	41	0	373	0

== Honours ==
Paulista

- Copa Paulista: 2010

Fortaleza

- Campeonato Cearense: 2019, 2020, 2021
- Copa do Nordeste: 2019

São Paulo

- Copa do Brasil: 2023

Fluminense

- Recopa Sudamericana: 2024
