= André Castro (footballer, born 1991) =

Brazilian footballer

Personal information
- Full name: André Andrade de Castro
- Date of birth: 2 November 1991 (age 35)
- Place of birth: São Paulo, Brazil
- Height: 1.81 m (5 ft 11 in)
- Positions: Defensive midfielder; centre-back

Team information
- Current team: Lemense

Youth career
- 2007–2009: Audax
- 2009–2010: Internacional

Senior career*
Years	Team	Apps	(Gls)
2011	Audax	8	(0)
2012–2013	Audax Rio	48	(2)
2014–2017	Osasco Audax	61	(0)
2014	→ Guaratinguetá (loan)	15	(0)
2015	→ Vitória (loan)	0	(0)
2016	→ Oeste (loan)	24	(0)
2017	Atlético Goianiense	32	(0)
2018	Red Bull Brasil	15	(1)
2018–2019	Ponte Preta	22	(0)
2019	Atlético Goianiense	23	(0)
2020	Mirassol	5	(0)
2020–2021	Ituano	12	(1)
2021	Erbil SC		
2022–	Lemense	4	(0)
- * Club domestic league appearances and goals as of 20:03, 30 May 2022 (UTC)

André Andrade de Castro (born 2 November 1991), known as André Castro, is a Brazilian professional footballer who plays for Lemense. A versatile player, he plays mainly as either a centre-back or defensive midfielder, but can also appear as a right-back.

== Career ==
Born in São Paulo, André Castro played in 2016 for Oeste in the Campeonato Brasileiro Série B due to a partnership between Audax and Oeste.

In May 2019, Castro returned to Atlético Goianiense.

== Career statistics ==
As of 19 August 2017

Appearances and goals by club, season and competition
Club	Season	League			State League		Cup		Conmebol		Other		Total	
Club	Season	Division	Apps	Goals	Apps	Goals	Apps	Goals	Apps	Goals	Apps	Goals	Apps	Goals
Audax	2011	Paulista A2	—		8	0	—		—		22 (Note: Appearance(s) in Copa Paulista)	0	30	0
Audax–RJ	2012	Carioca B	—		38	1	—		—		14 (Note: Appearance(s) in Copa Rio)	0	52	1
Audax–RJ	2013	Carioca	—		10	1	—		—		—		10	1
Audax–RJ	Total		—		48	2	—		—		14	0	62	2
Audax	2013	Paulista A2	—		—		—		—		17	2	17	2
Audax	2014	Paulista	—		14	0	—		—		—		14	0
Audax	2015	Paulista	—		14	0	—		—		—		14	0
Audax	2016	Série D	0	0	14	0	—		—		—		14	0
Audax	2017	Série D	0	0	11	0	2	0	—		—		13	0
Audax	Total		0	0	53	0	2	0	—		17	2	72	2
Guaratinguetá	2014	Série C	15	0	—		—		—		—		15	0
Vitória	2015	Série B	0	0	—		—		—		—		0	0
Oeste	2016	Série B	24	0	—		—		—		—		24	0
Atlético Goianiense	2017	Série A	18	0	—		0	0	—		—		18	0
Career total			57	0	109	4	2	0	0	0	53	2	221	4
