= Juca Baleia =

Brazilian footballer

Personal information
- Full name: Juvenal Marinho dos Passos
- Date of birth: 3 May 1959 (age 67)
- Place of birth: São Luís, Brazil
- Height: 1.85 m (6 ft 1 in)
- Position: Goalkeeper

Youth career
- 1976–1978: Sampaio Corrêa

Senior career*
Years	Team	Apps	(Gls)
1979	Expressinho		
1980	Tupan		
1981–1988	Maranhão		
1989	Bacabal		
1990–1993	Sampaio Corrêa		
1994	Expressinho		

Managerial career
- 2014: Expressinho
- 2017: Santa Quitéria (youth sectors)
- 2019: Santa Quitéria (director of football)
- * Club domestic league appearances and goals as of 11 September 2023

Juvenal Marinho dos Passos (born 3 May 1959), better known by the nickname Juca Baleia, is a Brazilian former professional footballer and manager who played as a goalkeeper.

== Career ==
Juca started in the youth teams of Sampaio Corrêa, but it was at rival Maranhão where he played most of the 1980s. Due to the problems he faced with being overweight (weighed around 120 kg), he gained the nickname "Juca Baleia" (English: Whale). At this time, he claimed that his good performance in goal decreased whenever he tried to lose weight. In 1990 he left folklore to shine at the club that revealed him, Sampaio Corrêa, becoming three-time state champions.

In 1992, he became nationally known after a great performance in a match against Palmeiras, at the 1992 Copa do Brasil. Juca treasures goalkeeper Carlos Gallo's shirt, received as a gift on that occasion.

Juca was coach of Expressinho in the 2014 Second Level conquest, and in the following years he started working at Santa Quitéria.

"I beat the law of physics" - Juca Baleia

== Honours ==
=== Player ===
Sampaio Corrêa

- Campeonato Maranhense: 1990, 1991, 1992

=== Manager ===
Expressinho

- Campeonato Maranhense Second Division: 2014

== See also ==
- Serjão, another Brazilian goalkeeper famous for being overweight.
