= Serjão =

Serjão (meaning "big Sergio" in Portuguese) is a nickname of people with given name Sergio and may refer to:

- Sérgio Luis Gardino da Silva (born 1979), Brazilian footballer
- Sérgio Luís Lisboa de Almeida (born 1966), Brazilian goalkeeper famous by his overweight
- Sérgio Ricardo de Jesus Vertello (born 1975), Brazilian footballer
- Sergio Luis Maciel Lucas (born 1979), Brazilian born Azerbaijani futsal player
