= Tchê Tchê =

Brazilian footballer

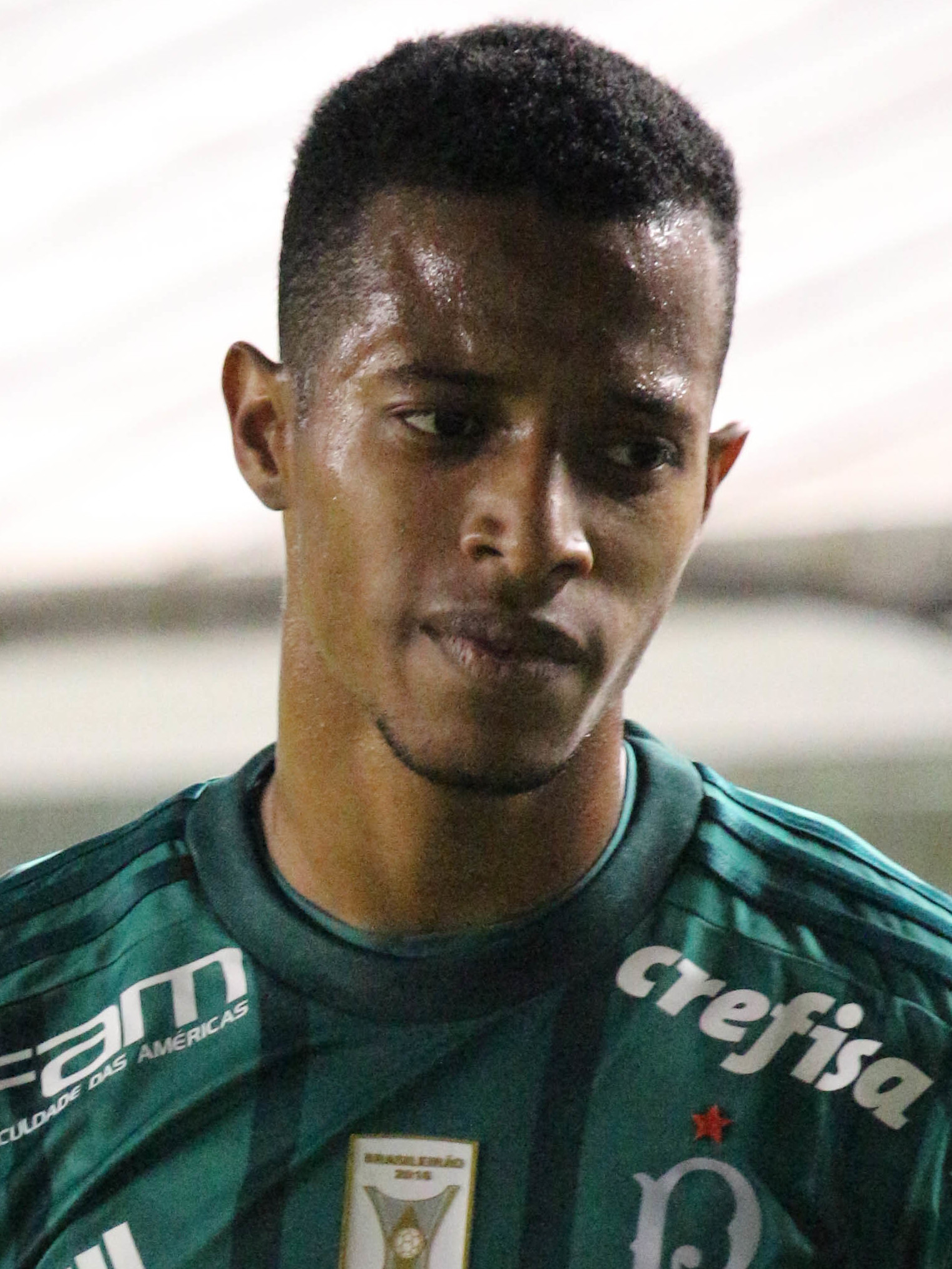
- Tchê Tchê with Palmeiras in 2017

Personal information
- Full name: Danilo das Neves Pinheiro
- Date of birth: 30 August 1992 (age 34)
- Place of birth: São Paulo, Brazil
- Height: 1.75 m (5 ft 9 in)
- Position: Midfielder

Team information
- Current team: Vasco da Gama
- Number: 3

Youth career
- 2006–2011: Audax

Senior career*
Years	Team	Apps	(Gls)
2011–2016	Audax	77	(7)
2014	→ Guaratinguetá (loan)	14	(0)
2015	→ Ponte Preta (loan)	0	(0)
2015	→ Boa Esporte (loan)	3	(0)
2016–2018	Palmeiras	94	(4)
2018–2019	Dynamo Kyiv	16	(0)
2019–2022	São Paulo	83	(6)
2021–2022	→ Atlético Mineiro (loan)	45	(1)
2022–2024	Botafogo	113	(4)
2025–	Vasco da Gama	65	(3)
- * Club domestic league appearances and goals as of 12 September 2026

Danilo das Neves Pinheiro (born 30 August 1992), known by his nickname Tchê Tchê, is a Brazilian professional footballer who plays as midfielder for Vasco da Gama.

== Club career ==
Born in São Paulo, Tchê Tchê joined Audax's youth setup in 2006, after being approved on a trial. He made his senior debut for the club on 27 March 2011, playing the last 14 minutes in a 3–1 Campeonato Paulista Série A2 home win against Rio Branco. Tchê Tchê was a regular starter for Audax in the club's first season in Campeonato Paulista, appearing in ten matches. His first match in the tournament occurred on 18 January 2014, a 0–0 away draw against Paulista. After subsequent loans at Guaratinguetá, Ponte Preta and Boa Esporte,

Tchê Tchê impressed with Audax during the 2016 Paulistão; he scored his first professional goal on 23 April 2016, netting from long range in a 2–2 draw at Corinthians, which ensured his team's qualification to the finals for the first time in their history. On 28 April 2016, Tchê Tchê signed a pre-contract with Série A club Palmeiras, being effective after the Campeonato Paulista finals. On 8 June 2018, Tchê Tchê signed a 5-year contract with Ukrainian Premier League club Dynamo Kyiv. On 30 March 2019, Tchê Tchê signed a four-year contract with São Paulo, coming back for his country Brazil.

On 6 April 2021, Tchê Tchê joined Atlético Mineiro on loan with an option to buy until May 2022. In April 2022, Botafogo presented Tchê Tchê as a new reinforcement. The first player from the SAF Botafogo era to reach 100 games for Glorioso, Tchê Tchê won honors from the Club before the classic against Flamengo, at Maracanã, in the seventh round of the Carioca Championship.

== Career statistics ==
=== Club ===
As of 12 September 2025.

Appearances and goals by club, season and competition
Club	Season	League			State League		Cup		Continental		Other		Total	
Club	Season	Division	Apps	Goals	Apps	Goals	Apps	Goals	Apps	Goals	Apps	Goals	Apps	Goals
Audax	2011	Paulista A2	—		1 (Note: Appearance(s) in Campeonato Paulista Série A2)	0	—		—		—		1	0
Audax	2012	Paulista A2	—		24	2	—		—		—		24	2
Audax	2013	Paulista A2	—		23	4	—		—		19 (Note: Appearance(s) in Copa Paulista)	2	42	6
Audax	2014	Paulista	—		10 (Note: Appearance(s) in Campeonato Paulista)	0	—		—		—		10	0
Audax	2016	Paulista	—		19	1	—		—		—		19	1
Audax	Total		—		77	7	—		—		19	2	96	9
Guaratinguetá (loan)	2014	Série C	15	0	—		—		—		—		15	0
Ponte Preta (loan)	2015	Série B	—		0	0	1	0	—		—		1	0
Boa Esporte (loan)	2015	Série B	3	0	—		—		—		—		3	0
Palmeiras	2016	Série A	37	2	—		2	1	—		—		39	3
Palmeiras	2017	Série A	34	0	8	2	4	0	7 (Note: Appearance(s) in Copa Libertadores)	0	—		53	2
Palmeiras	2018	Série A	1	0	14	0	0	0	3	0	—		18	0
Palmeiras	Total		72	2	22	2	6	1	10	0	—		110	5
Dynamo Kyiv	2018–19	Premier League	9	0	—		1	0	5 (Note: One appearance in UEFA Champions League, four appearances in UEFA Europa League)	0	1 (Note: Appearance in Ukrainian Super Cup)	0	16	0
São Paulo	2019	Série A	35	1	—		2	0	—		—		37	1
São Paulo	2020	Série A	34	4	11	0	5	0	8 (Note: Six appearances in Copa Libertadores, two appearances in Copa Sudamericana)	0	—		58	4
São Paulo	2021	Série A	—		3	1	—		—		—		3	1
São Paulo	Total		69	5	14	1	7	0	8	0	—		98	6
Atlético Mineiro (loan)	2021	Série A	33	1	5 (Note: Appearance(s) in Campeonato Mineiro)	0	9	0	10	0	—		57	1
Atlético Mineiro (loan)	2022	Série A	0	0	7	0	—		1	1	—		8	1
Atlético Mineiro (loan)	Total		33	1	12	0	9	0	11	1	—		65	2
Botafogo	2022	Série A	29	1	—		2	0	—		—		31	1
Botafogo	2023	Série A	36	2	11 (Note: Appearance(s) in Campeonato Carioca)	0	6	0	11 (Note: Appearances in Copa Sudamericana)	1	—		64	3
Botafogo	2024	Série A	28	0	9	1	3	0	15	0	—		55	1
Botafogo	Total		93	3	20	1	11	0	26	1	—		150	5
Vasco da Gama	2025	Série A	29	1	8	0	6	1	7	0	—		50	2
Vasco da Gama	2026	Série A	20	2	8	0	5	0	6	0	—		39	2
Vasco da Gama	Total		49	3	16	0	11	1	12	1	—		89	4
Career total			343	14	161	11	46	2	73	2	20	2	643	31

== Honours ==
=== Club ===
Palmeiras

- Campeonato Brasileiro Série A: 2016, 2018

Dynamo Kyiv

- Ukrainian Super Cup: 2018

Atlético Mineiro

- Campeonato Brasileiro Série A: 2021
- Copa do Brasil: 2021
- Campeonato Mineiro: 2021, 2022
- Supercopa do Brasil: 2022

Botafogo

- Copa Libertadores: 2024
- Campeonato Brasileiro Série A: 2024

=== Individual ===
- Campeonato Paulista Team of the Year: 2016
- Campeonato Paulista Best Newcomer: 2016
- Bola de Prata: 2016
- Campeonato Brasileiro Série A Team of the Year: 2016
- Best Central Midfielder in Brazil: 2016, 2023
