= Dorival Júnior =

Brazilian footballer (born 1962)

- Dorival Júnior with Corinthians in 2026

Personal information
- Full name: Dorival Silvestre Júnior
- Date of birth: 25 April 1962 (age 64)
- Place of birth: Araraquara, Brazil
- Height: 1.86 m (6 ft 1 in)
- Position: Defensive midfielder

Team information
- Current team: São Paulo (head coach)

Youth career
- 1976–1977: Marília
- 1978–1982: Ferroviária

Senior career*
Years	Team	Apps	(Gls)
1982–1983	Ferroviária	19	(0)
1983–1984	Marília		
1984–1985	Guarani	37	(0)
1985–1986	Avaí		
1986–1987	Joinville	35	(0)
1988	São José-SP	23	(1)
1988	Coritiba	23	(0)
1989–1992	Palmeiras	124	(3)
1993	Grêmio	9	(0)
1994–1995	Juventude	92	(4)
1996	Araçatuba		
1997	Matonense		
1998	Botafogo-SP		

International career
1993	Brazil	0	(0)

Managerial career
- 2002: Ferroviária
- 2003–2004: Figueirense
- 2005: Fortaleza
- 2005: Criciúma
- 2005: Juventude
- 2005–2006: Sport Recife
- 2006: Avaí
- 2006–2007: São Caetano
- 2007: Cruzeiro
- 2008: Coritiba
- 2009: Vasco da Gama
- 2010: Santos
- 2010–2011: Atlético Mineiro
- 2011–2012: Internacional
- 2012–2013: Flamengo
- 2013: Vasco da Gama
- 2013: Fluminense
- 2014: Palmeiras
- 2015–2017: Santos
- 2017–2018: São Paulo
- 2018: Flamengo
- 2020: Athletico Paranaense
- 2022: Ceará
- 2022: Flamengo
- 2023: São Paulo
- 2024–2025: Brazil
- 2025–2026: Corinthians
- 2026–: São Paulo
- * Club domestic league appearances and goals

Dorival Silvestre Júnior (Brazilian Portuguese pronunciation: [doɾiˈvaw siwˈvɛstɾi ˈʒuni.oʁ]; born 25 April 1962) is a Brazilian professional football coach and former player. He is the current head coach of São Paulo.

A defensive midfielder, Júnior notably played for Palmeiras. After retiring, he began his coaching career in 2002 with Ferroviária, but only gained national notoriety in 2010 when coaching Neymar's Santos. He later led Flamengo to a 2022 Copa Libertadores win and São Paulo to their first-ever Copa do Brasil title in 2023, before being named head coach of the Brazil national team in January 2024.

== Playing career ==
Known only as Júnior during his playing days, he was born in Araraquara, São Paulo, and made his debuts as a senior with hometown's Ferroviária in 1982. Two years later, after a brief stint at Marília (club he also represented in the youth setup), he moved to Guarani.

In 1985, Júnior began playing in the state of Santa Catarina, first for Avaí and later for Joinville. In 1988, he went back to his native state, representing São José, but during the same year he moved to Coritiba.

In 1989 Júnior joined Palmeiras, remaining with the club until 1992. In the following year he was sold to Grêmio, and subsequently joined Juventude in 1994.

Júnior had subsequent spells at Araçatuba, Matonense and Botafogo-SP, retiring with the latter.

== Coaching career ==
=== Early career ===
After retiring, Júnior immediately started working as an assistant of Luiz Carlos Ferreira at Matonense in 1999. He followed Ferreirão to the likes of Inter de Limeira, Atlético Sorocaba, Guarani, Paulista and Santo André, always as his assistant.

=== Ferroviária ===
In April 2002, while an assistant coach at Figueirense, Júnior was named head coach of his first club Ferroviária. He left in May of that year to return to Figueirense, as a director of football.

=== Figueirense ===
In September 2003, Júnior was named head coach of Figueira in the place of Ferreira. He won the 2004 Campeonato Catarinense with the side, but was sacked on 20 December of that year.

=== Fortaleza ===
Three days after leaving Figueirense, Júnior was appointed Fortaleza head coach, replacing Zetti. He was dismissed on 30 March, after a 2–2 draw against rivals Ceará.

=== Criciúma and Juventude ===
In May 2005, Júnior took over Criciúma, but left the club on 8 July after accepting an offer from Juventude. He was dismissed from the latter on 29 July, after just four matches.

=== Sport Recife ===
On 8 November 2005, Júnior agreed to become Sport Recife's head coach for the upcoming season. He won the 2006 Campeonato Pernambucano, but was relieved from his duties on 15 August, being subsequently replaced by Givanildo Oliveira.

=== Avaí and São Caetano ===
On 6 September 2006, Júnior was appointed Avaí head coach. He left the club on 17 October to take over São Caetano, but was unable to avoid relegation from the top tier.

=== Cruzeiro ===
On 8 May 2007, after impressing with the Azulão during that year's Campeonato Paulista, when the club reached the finals, Júnior was named Cruzeiro head coach. On 3 December, despite finishing fifth, he was fired.

=== Coritiba ===
On 4 January 2008, Júnior was presented as head coach of another club he represented as a player, Coritiba. On 13 November, he announced he would depart the club at the end of the campaign.

=== Vasco da Gama ===
After not renewing contract with Coxa, Júnior was appointed at the helm of Vasco da Gama on 12 December 2008. He led the club to a promotion from the 2009 Série B, but still announced his departure on 27 November 2009, after failing to agree new terms.

=== Santos ===
On 5 December 2009, Júnior was named head coach of Santos. He led the club to the 2010 Campeonato Paulista and 2010 Copa do Brasil titles (with an historical 10–0 win over Naviraiense in the latter tournament) with an extremely offensive football, with Neymar, Paulo Henrique Ganso and Robinho as its key units.

==== Altercation with Neymar and dismissal ====
On 15 September 2010, Júnior had an altercation with Neymar during a 4–2 home win over Atlético Goianiense; after suffering a penalty, Neymar demanded to take the spot kick, but was told by Júnior that Marcel was the one who would take it. Despite Marcel's goal, the discussion between the player and the coach remained, with Neymar later refusing to pass the ball to Marcel in the match.

On 21 September 2010, it was reported that Júnior would keep Neymar out of the upcoming match against Corinthians as a punishment for his indiscipline actions. Just hours later, however, he was dismissed.

=== Atlético Mineiro ===
On 25 September 2010, just four days after leaving Santos, Júnior took over Atlético Mineiro, replacing Vanderlei Luxemburgo. He managed to avoid relegation with the club, but was sacked the following 7 August, after being knocked out of the 2011 Copa do Brasil and losing the 2011 Campeonato Mineiro.

=== Internacional ===
On 12 August 2011, Júnior was named at the helm of Internacional. He won the 2012 Campeonato Gaúcho, and despite struggling with the absence of key players Oscar and Leandro Damião to the 2012 Summer Olympics, he was dismissed on 20 July 2012.

=== Flamengo ===
Five days after leaving Inter, Júnior took over Flamengo. He signed a contract until the end of 2013. On 16 March 2013, he left the club after rejecting a wage cut.

=== Vasco da Gama return ===
On 10 July 2013, Júnior agreed to return to Vasco. He was sacked on 28 October, with the club in the relegation zone.

=== Fluminense ===
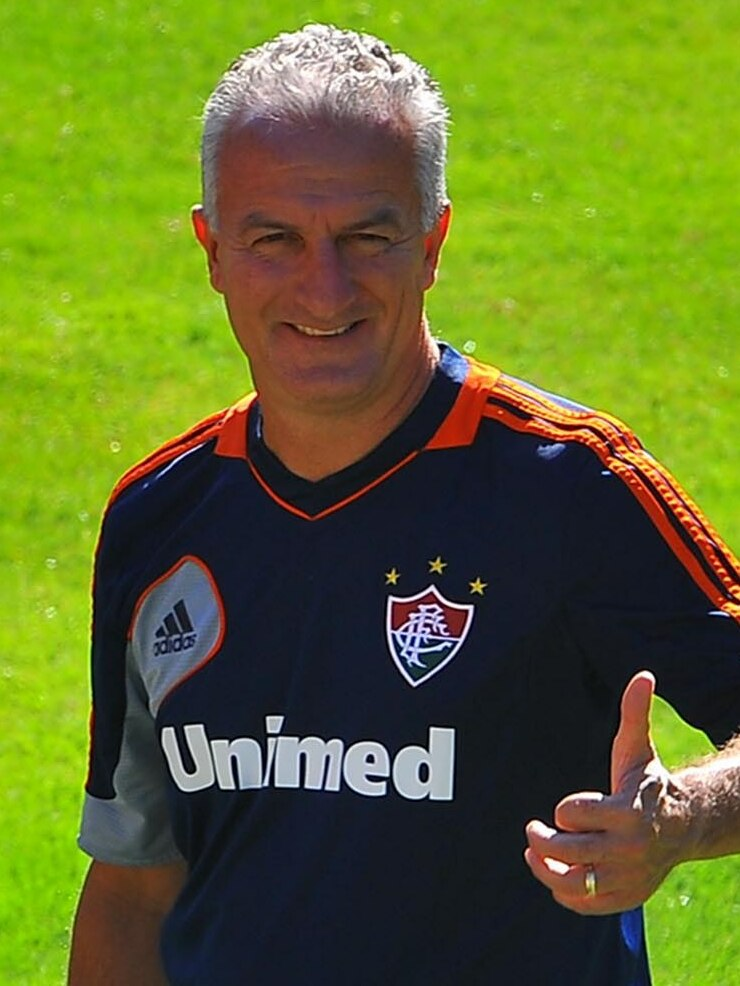
Júnior with Fluminense in a training period in November 2013

On 11 November 2013, Júnior was appointed head coach of Fluminense. With the club in the relegation zone, he avoided the drop due to Portuguesa's irregular lineup of Héverton.

On 10 December 2013, Júnior left Flu.

=== Palmeiras ===
On 3 September 2014, Júnior agreed to become Palmeiras' head coach, with a contract until the end of the year. He narrowly avoided relegation with the club, and was sacked on 8 December.

=== Santos return ===
Júnior returned to Santos on 9 July 2015, replacing Marcelo Fernandes. In his first year, he took the club out of the relegation zone to finish seventh, while also reaching the finals of the 2015 Copa do Brasil.

Júnior led Peixe to the second position in the 2016 Campeonato Brasileiro Série A, aside from winning the 2016 Campeonato Paulista. On 4 June 2017, after a 1–0 away defeat to rivals Corinthians and with the club in a poor form overall (only three points out of twelve), he was sacked.

=== São Paulo ===
On 5 July 2017, Júnior took over São Paulo, signing a contract until the end of 2018. He was sacked the following 9 March, after a defeat to rivals Palmeiras.

=== Flamengo return ===
Júnior returned to Flamengo on 28 September 2018, for the remaining 12 matches of the season. He left in December, after his contract expired.

=== Athletico Paranaense ===
On 27 December 2019, Júnior was appointed head coach of fellow top tier side Athletico Paranaense. The following 28 August, he was dismissed by the club after suffering four consecutive defeats, despite him being sidelined in three of those defeats after testing positive for COVID-19.

=== Ceará ===
On 28 March 2022, after more than one year without coaching, Júnior took over Ceará also in the top tier. He led the club to six straight wins in the 2022 Copa Sudamericana group stage, becoming the first club to do so.

=== Third spell at Flamengo ===
On 10 June 2022, Júnior left Ceará to return to Flamengo, replacing sacked Paulo Sousa. He led the side to the Copa do Brasil and Copa Libertadores titles, but left on 25 November, after not renewing his contract.

=== São Paulo return ===
On 20 April 2023, Júnior returned to São Paulo, replacing sacked Rogério Ceni. He helped the club to win their first-ever Copa do Brasil, after a 2–1 aggregate win over former side Flamengo.

On 7 January 2024, São Paulo released an official note stating that Júnior had left the club to take over the Brazil national team.

=== Brazil national team ===
On 10 January 2024, the Brazilian Football Confederation confirmed Júnior as head coach of the Brazil national team. On 28 March 2025, he was sacked from the role. The decision was announced three days after Brazil suffered a 4–1 defeat to Argentina, the joint-record for Brazil's largest losing margin in the history of the World Cup qualifiers (tied with a 3–0 defeat to Chile in 2000). Júnior was in charge of the Seleção for sixteen matches, with seven wins, seven draws and two defeats.

=== Corinthians ===
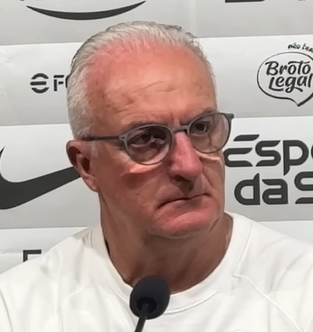
Júnior with Corinthians in 2026

On 28 April 2025, Júnior was announced as head coach of Corinthians, signing a contract until December 2026. He led the club to the 2025 Copa do Brasil – his fourth individual win in the competition – and the 2026 Supercopa do Brasil titles, respectively defeating Vasco da Gama and Flamengo. On 5 April 2026, Júnior was fired from Timão after a run of eight winless matches.

=== Third spell at São Paulo ===
On 15 May 2026, Júnior returned to São Paulo for a third spell, signing a contract until the end of the year.

== Personal life ==
Júnior is the nephew of the former Brazilian player Dudu. His son, Lucas Silvestre, is also his assistant since 2010.

In September 2019, Júnior was diagnosed with prostate cancer, which he had removed the following month.

== Career statistics ==
Appearances and goals by club, season and competition
Club	Season	League			State League		Cup		Continental		Other		Total	
Club	Season	Division	Apps	Goals	Apps	Goals	Apps	Goals	Apps	Goals	Apps	Goals	Apps	Goals
Guarani	1984	Série B	11	0	23	0	—		—		7 (Note: Appearance(s) in Torneio Heleno Nunes)	0	41	0
Guarani	1985	Série A	3	0	0	0	—		—		—		3	0
Guarani	Total		14	0	23	0	—		—		7	0	44	0
São José-SP	1988	Paulista	—		23	1	—		—		—		23	1
Coritiba	1988	Série A	23	0	—		—		—		—		23	0
Palmeiras	1989	Série A	16	0	23	2	—		—		—		39	2
Palmeiras	1990	Série A	16	0	27	0	—		—		—		43	0
Palmeiras	1991	Série A	13	0	20	1	—		—		—		33	1
Palmeiras	1992	Série A	1	0	8	0	3	1	—		—		12	1
Palmeiras	Total		46	0	78	3	3	1	—		—		127	4
Grêmio	1993	Série A	7	0	2	0	8	0	—		1 (Note: Appearance(s) in Supercopa Libertadores)	0	18	1
Juventude	1994	Série B	18	2	34	2	—		—		—		52	4
Juventude	1995	Série A	12	0	28	0	4	0	—		—		44	0
Juventude	Total		30	2	62	2	4	0	—		—		96	4
Career total			120	2	188	6	15	1	0	0	8	0	331	9

== Coaching statistics ==
As of 4 November 2026

Coaching record by team and tenure
Team	From	To	Record								Ref
Team	From	To	G	W	D	L	GF	GA	GD	Win %	Ref
Ferroviária	April 2002	May 2002	8	2	2	4	13	16	−3	25.00	
Figueirense	25 September 2003	20 December 2004	81	31	23	27	116	98	+18	38.27	
Fortaleza	23 December 2004	30 March 2005	25	13	8	4	45	28	+17	52.00	
Criciúma	26 May 2005	6 July 2005	7	3	1	3	11	13	−2	42.86	
Juventude	10 July 2005	29 July 2005	4	1	0	3	7	14	−7	25.00	
Sport Recife	8 November 2005	15 August 2006	36	18	10	8	59	35	+24	50.00	
Avaí	6 September 2006	17 October 2006	9	3	1	5	12	15	−3	33.33	
São Caetano	17 October 2006	8 May 2007	32	16	5	11	50	39	+11	50.00	
Cruzeiro	8 May 2007	3 December 2007	40	19	6	15	74	60	+14	47.50	
Coritiba	4 January 2008	7 December 2008	67	32	15	20	104	65	+39	47.76	
Vasco da Gama	12 December 2008	29 November 2009	62	38	16	8	111	47	+64	61.29	
Santos	5 December 2009	21 September 2010	58	37	7	14	148	75	+73	63.79	
Atlético Mineiro	25 September 2010	8 August 2011	51	25	10	16	97	74	+23	49.02	
Internacional	12 August 2011	20 July 2012	63	32	18	13	107	59	+48	50.79	
Flamengo	25 July 2012	16 March 2013	37	15	12	10	42	37	+5	40.54	
Vasco da Gama	10 July 2013	28 October 2013	29	9	8	12	43	45	−2	31.03	
Fluminense	11 November 2013	10 December 2013	5	3	1	1	8	5	+3	60.00	
Palmeiras	3 September 2014	8 December 2014	20	6	5	9	20	35	−15	30.00	
Santos	9 July 2015	4 June 2017	127	74	25	28	217	112	+105	58.27	
São Paulo	5 July 2017	9 March 2018	40	17	11	12	50	45	+5	42.50	
Flamengo	28 September 2018	1 December 2018	12	7	3	2	21	7	+14	58.33	
Athletico Paranaense	27 December 2019	28 August 2020	18	9	3	6	27	16	+11	50.00	
Ceará	28 March 2022	10 June 2022	18	11	4	3	33	13	+20	61.11	
Flamengo	10 June 2022	31 December 2022	43	26	8	9	77	35	+42	60.47	
São Paulo	20 April 2023	7 January 2024	54	25	13	16	64	46	+18	46.30	
Brazil	10 January 2024	28 March 2025	16	7	7	2	25	17	+8	43.75	
Corinthians	28 April 2025	5 April 2026	66	26	19	21	71	61	+10	39.39	
São Paulo	15 May 2026	present	24	7	8	9	25	26	−1	29.17	
Total			1,052	512	249	291	1,677	1,138	+539	48.67	—

== Honours ==
=== Player ===
Joinville

- Campeonato Catarinense: 1987

Grêmio

- Campeonato Gaúcho: 1993

Juventude

- Campeonato Brasileiro Série B: 1994

=== Coach ===
Figueirense

- Campeonato Catarinense: 2004

Sport Recife

- Campeonato Pernambucano: 2006

Coritiba

- Campeonato Paranaense: 2008

Vasco da Gama

- Campeonato Brasileiro Série B: 2009

Santos

- Copa do Brasil: 2010
- Campeonato Paulista: 2010, 2016

Internacional

- Recopa Sudamericana: 2011
- Campeonato Gaúcho: 2012

Athletico Paranaense

- Campeonato Paranaense: 2020

Flamengo

- Copa do Brasil: 2022
- Copa Libertadores: 2022

São Paulo

- Copa do Brasil: 2023

Corinthians

- Copa do Brasil: 2025
- Supercopa do Brasil: 2026

== See also ==
- List of football managers with the most matches
