= Serjão (footballer, born 1966) =

Brazilian footballer

Personal information
- Full name: Sérgio Luís Lisboa de Almeida
- Date of birth: 7 October 1966 (age 60)
- Place of birth: Brasília, Brazil
- Height: 1.88 m (6 ft 2 in)
- Position: Goalkeeper

Youth career
- Ceilândia
- Tiradentes-DF
- Serrano-RJ
- Portuguesa-RJ
- Vasco da Gama

Senior career*
Years	Team	Apps	(Gls)
1990	Tiradentes-DF		
1991	Vasco-DF		
1997	Gama (director of football)		
2003	ARUC-DF		
2004–2006	Ceilândia		
- * Club domestic league appearances and goals as of 11 September 2023

Sérgio Luís Lisboa de Almeida (born 7 October 1966), better known as Serjão, is a Brazilian former professional footballer who played as a goalkeeper.

== Career ==
Serjão gained fame in 2003, when he competed in the Campeonato Brasiliense for ARUC weighing 153 kg (around 338 lbs). This is due to the fact that he was already retired from professional football, and only returned due to his good performance in the amateur league in Brasília. Serjão played again in 2004, 2005 and 2006, this time for Ceilândia EC. In 1997, he had been football director at Gama.

== Personal life ==
After definitively retiring from football, he managed a company that operated in the construction sector. In 2015, due to an investigation into money laundering, he was arrested. At the time, he was found trying to hide inside a doghouse.

== See also ==
- Juca Baleia, another Brazilian goalkeeper famous for being overweight.
