= 2016 Campeonato Paulista =

Campeonato Paulista - Série A1
- Season: 2016
- Teams: 20
- Champions: Santos
- Relegated: Água Santa; Mogi Mirim; XV de Piracicaba; Oeste; Capivariano; Rio Claro
- Série D: Audax; São Bento
- Matches: 158
- Goals: 411 (2.6 per match)
- Best player: Lucas Lima
- Top goalscorer: Roger (11 goals)
- Best goalkeeper: Vanderlei
- Biggest home win: Ponte Preta 7–2 Água Santa (2 April)
- Biggest away win: Ferroviária 3–5 Santos (3 April)
- Highest scoring: Ponte Preta 7–2 Água Santa (2 April)

The 2016 Campeonato Paulista de Futebol Profissional da Primeira Divisão - Série A1 was the 115th season of São Paulo's top professional football league.

== Format ==
- In the first stage the twenty teams are drawn, with seeding, into four groups of five teams each, with each team playing once against the fifteen clubs from the other three groups. After each team has played fifteen matches, the top two teams of each group qualify for the quarter-final stage.
- After the completion of the first stage, the six clubs with the lowest number of points, regardless of the group, will be relegated to the Campeonato Paulista Série A2.
- If the four clubs with the lowest number of points are from the same group, the best third-placed club from the other groups will qualify for the quarter-final stage.
- Quarter-finals and semi-finals are played in a single match, with the best placed first stage team playing at home. The finals are played in a two-legged home and away fixture, with the best placed first stage team playing the second leg at home.
- In case of a draw in any knockout stage, the match will be decided by a penalty shoot-out.

=== Tiebreakers ===
The teams are ranked according to points (3 points for a win, 1 point for a draw, 0 points for a loss). If two or more teams are equal on points on completion of the group matches, the following criteria are applied to determine the rankings:

1. Higher number of wins;
2. Superior goal difference;
3. Higher number of goals scored;
4. Fewest red cards received;
5. Fewest yellow cards received;
6. Draw in the headquarters of the FPF.

== Teams ==
| Club | Home city | Manager | 2015 result |
|---|---|---|---|
| Água Santa | Diadema | Márcio Bittencourt | 4th (Série A2) |
| Audax | Osasco | Fernando Diniz | 9th |
| Botafogo-SP | Ribeirão Preto | Márcio Fernandes | 7th |
| Capivariano | Capivari | Roberto Fernandes | 14th |
| Corinthians | São Paulo (Tatuapé) | Tite | 3rd |
| Ferroviária | Araraquara | Ricardo Moraes | 1st (Série A2) |
| Ituano | Itu | Tarcísio Pugliese | 11th |
| Linense | Lins | Moacir Júnior | 16th |
| Mogi Mirim | Mogi Mirim | Flávio Araújo | 12th |
| Novorizontino | Novo Horizonte | Guilherme | 2nd (Série A2) |
| Oeste | Itápolis | Serjão | 3rd (Série A2) |
| Palmeiras | São Paulo (Perdizes) | Cuca | 2nd |
| Ponte Preta | Campinas | Alexandre Gallo | 5th |
| Red Bull Brasil | Campinas | Mauricio Barbieri | 6th |
| Rio Claro | Rio Claro | Sérgio Guedes | 15th |
| Santos | Santos | Dorival Júnior | 1st |
| São Bento | Sorocaba | Paulo Roberto Santos | 10th |
| São Bernardo | São Bernardo do Campo | Sérgio Soares | 13th |
| São Paulo | São Paulo (Morumbi) | Edgardo Bauza | 4th |
| XV de Piracicaba | Piracicaba | Luiz Carlos Ferreira | 8th |

Source: Futebol Paulista

== First stage ==
Group winners and runners-up advance to the quarter-finals. Six bottom teams (independent of group) are relegated.

=== Group A ===
| Pos | Team | Pld | W | D | L | GF | GA | GD | Pts | Qualification or relegation |
|---|---|---|---|---|---|---|---|---|---|---|
| 1 | Santos (Q) | 15 | 9 | 5 | 1 | 28 | 14 | +14 | 32 | Advance to the quarter-finals |
| 2 | São Bento (Q) | 15 | 7 | 6 | 2 | 21 | 11 | +10 | 27 | Advance to the quarter-finals |
| 3 | Linense (E) | 15 | 4 | 8 | 3 | 21 | 19 | +2 | 20 | |
| 4 | Botafogo-SP (E) | 15 | 4 | 7 | 4 | 15 | 14 | +1 | 19 | |
| 5 | Oeste (R) | 15 | 3 | 4 | 8 | 13 | 20 | −7 | 13 | Relegated |

(E) Eliminated; (Q) Qualified for the phase indicated; (R) Relegated

=== Group B ===
| Pos | Team | Pld | W | D | L | GF | GA | GD | Pts | Qualification or relegation |
|---|---|---|---|---|---|---|---|---|---|---|
| 1 | Palmeiras (Q) | 15 | 7 | 3 | 5 | 25 | 17 | +8 | 24 | Advance to the quarter-finals |
| 2 | São Bernardo (Q) | 15 | 6 | 5 | 4 | 22 | 21 | +1 | 23 | Advance to the quarter-finals |
| 3 | Ponte Preta (E) | 15 | 6 | 4 | 5 | 22 | 16 | +6 | 22 | |
| 4 | Ituano (E) | 15 | 6 | 4 | 5 | 19 | 19 | 0 | 22 | |
| 5 | Novorizontino (E) | 15 | 5 | 6 | 4 | 24 | 21 | +3 | 21 | |

(E) Eliminated; (Q) Qualified for the phase indicated

=== Group C ===
| Pos | Team | Pld | W | D | L | GF | GA | GD | Pts | Qualification or relegation |
|---|---|---|---|---|---|---|---|---|---|---|
| 1 | Audax (Q) | 15 | 7 | 3 | 5 | 24 | 21 | +3 | 24 | Advance to the quarter-finals |
| 2 | São Paulo (Q) | 15 | 6 | 4 | 5 | 17 | 14 | +3 | 22 | Advance to the quarter-finals |
| 3 | Ferroviária (E) | 15 | 5 | 2 | 8 | 19 | 21 | −2 | 17 | |
| 4 | XV de Piracicaba (R) | 15 | 3 | 6 | 6 | 12 | 19 | −7 | 15 | Relegated |
| 5 | Capivariano (R) | 15 | 2 | 4 | 9 | 14 | 29 | −15 | 10 | Relegated |

(E) Eliminated; (Q) Qualified for the phase indicated; (R) Relegated

=== Group D ===
| Pos | Team | Pld | W | D | L | GF | GA | GD | Pts | Qualification or relegation |
|---|---|---|---|---|---|---|---|---|---|---|
| 1 | Corinthians (Q) | 15 | 11 | 2 | 2 | 26 | 8 | +18 | 35 | Advance to the quarter-finals |
| 2 | Red Bull Brasil (Q) | 15 | 7 | 1 | 7 | 24 | 22 | +2 | 22 | Advance to the quarter-finals |
| 3 | Água Santa (R) | 15 | 4 | 4 | 7 | 17 | 29 | −12 | 16 | Relegated |
| 4 | Mogi Mirim (R) | 15 | 4 | 3 | 8 | 12 | 23 | −11 | 15 | Relegated |
| 5 | Rio Claro (R) | 15 | 2 | 3 | 10 | 9 | 26 | −17 | 9 | Relegated |

(Q) Qualified for the phase indicated; (R) Relegated

== Knockout stage ==
=== Bracket ===
Quarterfinals
A1 | Santos | 2
A2 | São Bento | 0
B1 | Palmeiras | 2
B2 | São Bernardo | 0
D1 | Corinthians | 4
D2 | Red Bull Brasil | 0
C1 | Audax | 4
C2 | São Paulo | 1

Semifinals
A1 | Santos | 2 (3)
B1 | Palmeiras | 2 (2)
D1 | Corinthians | 2 (1)
C1 | Audax | 2 (4)

Finals
A1 | Santos | 1 | 1 | 2
C1 | Audax | 1 | 0 | 1

Note: Semifinal bracket depend on general table: 1 vs 4 ; 2 vs 3

== General table ==
| Pos | Team | Pld | W | D | L | GF | GA | GD | Pts | Qualification or relegation |
|---|---|---|---|---|---|---|---|---|---|---|
| 1 | Santos (C) | 19 | 11 | 7 | 1 | 34 | 17 | +17 | 40 | Finals of knockout stage |
| 2 | Audax (B) | 19 | 8 | 5 | 6 | 31 | 26 | +5 | 29 | Finals of knockout stage |
| 3 | Corinthians | 17 | 12 | 3 | 2 | 32 | 10 | +22 | 39 | Eliminated in the semifinals |
| 4 | Palmeiras | 17 | 8 | 4 | 5 | 29 | 19 | +10 | 28 | Eliminated in the semifinals |
| 5 | São Bento | 16 | 7 | 6 | 3 | 21 | 13 | +8 | 27 | Eliminated in the quarterfinals |
| 6 | São Bernardo (B) | 16 | 6 | 5 | 5 | 22 | 23 | −1 | 23 | Eliminated in the quarterfinals |
| 7 | Red Bull Brasil (B) | 16 | 7 | 1 | 8 | 24 | 26 | −2 | 22 | Eliminated in the quarterfinals |
| 8 | São Paulo | 16 | 6 | 4 | 6 | 18 | 18 | 0 | 22 | Eliminated in the quarterfinals |
| 9 | Ponte Preta | 15 | 6 | 4 | 5 | 22 | 16 | +6 | 22 | |
| 10 | Ituano (B) | 15 | 6 | 4 | 5 | 19 | 19 | 0 | 22 | |
| 11 | Novorizontino | 15 | 5 | 6 | 4 | 24 | 21 | +3 | 21 | |
| 12 | Linense | 15 | 4 | 8 | 3 | 21 | 19 | +2 | 20 | |
| 13 | Botafogo-SP | 15 | 4 | 7 | 4 | 15 | 14 | +1 | 19 | |
| 14 | Ferroviária | 15 | 5 | 2 | 8 | 19 | 21 | −2 | 17 | |
| 15 | Água Santa (R) | 15 | 4 | 4 | 7 | 16 | 28 | −12 | 16 | Relegation to 2017 Campeonato Paulista Série A2 |
| 16 | Mogi Mirim (R) | 15 | 4 | 3 | 8 | 12 | 23 | −11 | 15 | Relegation to 2017 Campeonato Paulista Série A2 |
| 17 | XV de Piracicaba (R) | 15 | 3 | 6 | 6 | 12 | 19 | −7 | 15 | Relegation to 2017 Campeonato Paulista Série A2 |
| 18 | Oeste (R) | 15 | 3 | 4 | 8 | 13 | 19 | −6 | 13 | Relegation to 2017 Campeonato Paulista Série A2 |
| 19 | Capivariano (R) | 15 | 2 | 4 | 9 | 17 | 34 | −17 | 10 | Relegation to 2017 Campeonato Paulista Série A2 |
| 20 | Rio Claro (R) | 15 | 2 | 3 | 10 | 9 | 26 | −17 | 9 | Relegation to 2017 Campeonato Paulista Série A2 |

Updated to match(es) played on 8 May 2016. Source: Soccerway.com
Rules for classification: 1st points; 2nd wins; 3rd goal difference; 4th goals scored; 5th head-to-head results; 6th least red cards received; 7th least yellow cards received; 8th draw.
(B) Qualification for the Campeonato Brasileiro Série D; (C) Champions; (R) Relegated

== Top scorers ==
As of 8 May 2016

| Rank | Player | Club | Goals |
|---|---|---|---|
| 1. | (Brazil) Roger | Red Bull Brasil | 11 |
| 2. | (Brazil) Rodrigo Andrade | Audax | 8 |
| 2. | (Brazil) Alecsandro | Palmeiras | 8 |
| 3. | (Brazil) William Pottker | Linense | 7 |
| 3. | (Brazil) Wellington Paulista | Ponte Preta | 7 |
| 3. | (Brazil) Gabriel | Santos | 7 |
| 3. | (Brazil) Ricardo Oliveira | Santos | 7 |

== Awards ==
=== Team of the year ===
| Pos. | Player | Club |
|---|---|---|
| GK | (Brazil) Vanderlei | Santos |
| DF | (Brazil) Fagner | Corinthians |
| DF | (Brazil) Felipe | Corinthians |
| DF | (Brazil) Gustavo Henrique | Santos |
| DF | (Brazil) Zeca | Santos |
| MF | (Brazil) Thiago Maia | Santos |
| MF | (Brazil) Camacho | Audax |
| MF | (Brazil) Tchê Tchê | Audax |
| MF | (Brazil) Lucas Lima | Santos |
| FW | (Brazil) Roger | Red Bull Brasil |
| FW | (Brazil) Gabriel | Santos |

Source Globo Esporte
Last updated: 9 May 2016

Player of the Season

The Player of the Year was awarded to Lucas Lima.

Young Player of the Season

The Young Player of the Year was awarded to Tchê Tchê.

Countryside Best Player of the Season

The Countryside Best Player of the Year was awarded to Roger.

Top scorer of the Season

The top scorer of the season was Roger, who scored 11 goals.
