= Clube Atlético Sorocaba =

Brazilian football club

Atlético Sorocaba
- Full name: Clube Atlético Sorocaba
- Nickname: Galo (Rooster)
- Founded: 21 February 1991; 35 years ago
- Dissolved: April 2016
- Ground: Estádio Municipal Walter Ribeiro
- Capacity: 13,722
- Owner: Unification Church
- President: Koichi Sasaki
- 2016: Paulista Série A2, 18th of 20 (relegated)
Home colors	Away colors

Clube Atlético Sorocaba, usually known as Atlético Sorocaba, was a Brazilian football club from Sorocaba, having competed in the Campeonato Brasileiro Série C several times.

== History ==
The club was founded on 21 February 1991 by entrepreneur João Caracante Filho as a basketball and volleyball club.

Atlético Sorocaba became a football club on 15 March 1993 after they fused with Clube Atlético Barcelona and Estrada de Ferro Sorocabana Futebol Clube.

Atlético Sorocaba competed in the Campeonato Brasileiro Série C in 1994, 1995, 1996, 1997, 1998, 2002, 2003, and 2004. The club's best performances was in 1996, when they reached the third stage of the competition.

In 2016, owing to financial issues, Atlético Sorocaba officials announced their withdrawal from professional competitions after being relegated to Série A3.

Their last official game was on 3 April 2016, a goalless draw against Portuguesa.

In 2026, after ten years of inactivity, Atlético Sorocaba was disaffiliated by Federação Paulista de Futebol (FPF) for "non-compliance with statutory obligations". The disaffiliation disciplinary procedure was opened by the FPF in 2024 and approved by the Sports Justice Court of São Paulo state (Tribunal de Justiça Desportiva do Estado de São Paulo, TJD-SP) at the beginning of March 2026.

== Ownership ==
The club was owned by Sun Myung Moon's Unification Church, as was CENE.

== Rivalry ==
Atlético Sorocaba had an intense rivalry with São Bento called the "Derby Sorocabano" (Brazilian Portuguese: Dérbi Sorocabano).

Games played	São Bento wins	São Bento goals	Atlético Sorocaba wins	Atlético Sorocaba goals	Draws
40	8	33	17	49	15

== Matches against North Korea ==
Atlético Sorocaba gained popularity due to their trips to North Korea between 2009 and 2015 as a result of an invitation by Sun Myung Moon, then-club owner.

=== First trip ===
On their first trip, in 2009, Atlético Sorocaba played a friendly against the North Korean national team at Kim Il Sung Stadium, as a preparation game for the 2010 World Cup, in which the North Koreans had qualified for.

This friendly is the most well-known friendly because the 80,000 people in attendance were led to believe that Atlético Sorocaba were in fact the Brazilian national team.

The result of this friendly, played on November 5, 2009, was a draw.

Atlético Sorocaba players later said in interviews that they were scared they would not have been let out of North Korea if they won the match, which prompted them to play for a draw.

=== Second trip ===
Their second trip, in 2010, was less eventful, mainly due to a reduced excitement around football following the nation's failure at the 2010 World Cup. This time, the club was no longer recognized as the Brazilian national team.

The match was played at Yanggakdo Stadium, with around 40,000 people in attendance.

The match ended in a 1-0 victory for the North Koreans, with the winning goal being a controversial penalty.

Multiple Atlético Sorocaba players complained about the refereeing in this friendly.

=== Third trip ===
Their third trip, in 2011, would mark the final time they would send their professional squad to North Korea.

Led by Fernando Diniz, they would play two more friendlies, one resulting in another 1-0 win for North Korea, and another 0-0 draw in the second friendly.

=== Fourth and final trip ===
In their fourth and final trip, in 2015, they would only send their U-15 squad, in order to play a tournament against other youth teams from North Korea, South Korea, China and Croatia.

Atlético Sorocaba would finish third in this youth competition, with the final being between two North Korean teams.

Another talking point about this trip was one of their squad members, Pedro Lutti, being born in the United States.

Born in Miami to Brazilian parents, he only lived in the United States for 1 month when he was born. He made the trip to North Korea with Brazilian paperwork and his birthplace was never discovered by North Korean authorities.

During the trip, his fellow squad member made jokes to him that they would inform the authorities that he was American.

== Records ==
The club's records prior to their dissolution are as below:

Games played	Wins	Draws	Losses
808	312	234	262

== Honours ==
=== Regional ===
- Recopa Sul-Brasileira
  - Runners-up (1): 2008

=== State ===
- Copa Paulista
  - Winners (1): 2008
