= Guaratinguetá Futebol =

Brazilian association football club based in São Paulo

Guaratinguetá
- Full name: Guaratinguetá Futebol Ltda.
- Nickname(s): Garça; O Orgulho do Vale
- Founded: 1 October 1998
- Dissolved: 6 March 2017; 8 years ago
- Ground: Ninho da Garça
- Capacity: 15,769
- President: Domilson de Araujo Carneiro
- 2016 2016: Série B, 20th of 20 (relegated); Paulista Série A3, 17th of 20 (relegated)
- Website: guarafutebol.com.br
Home colors	Away colors

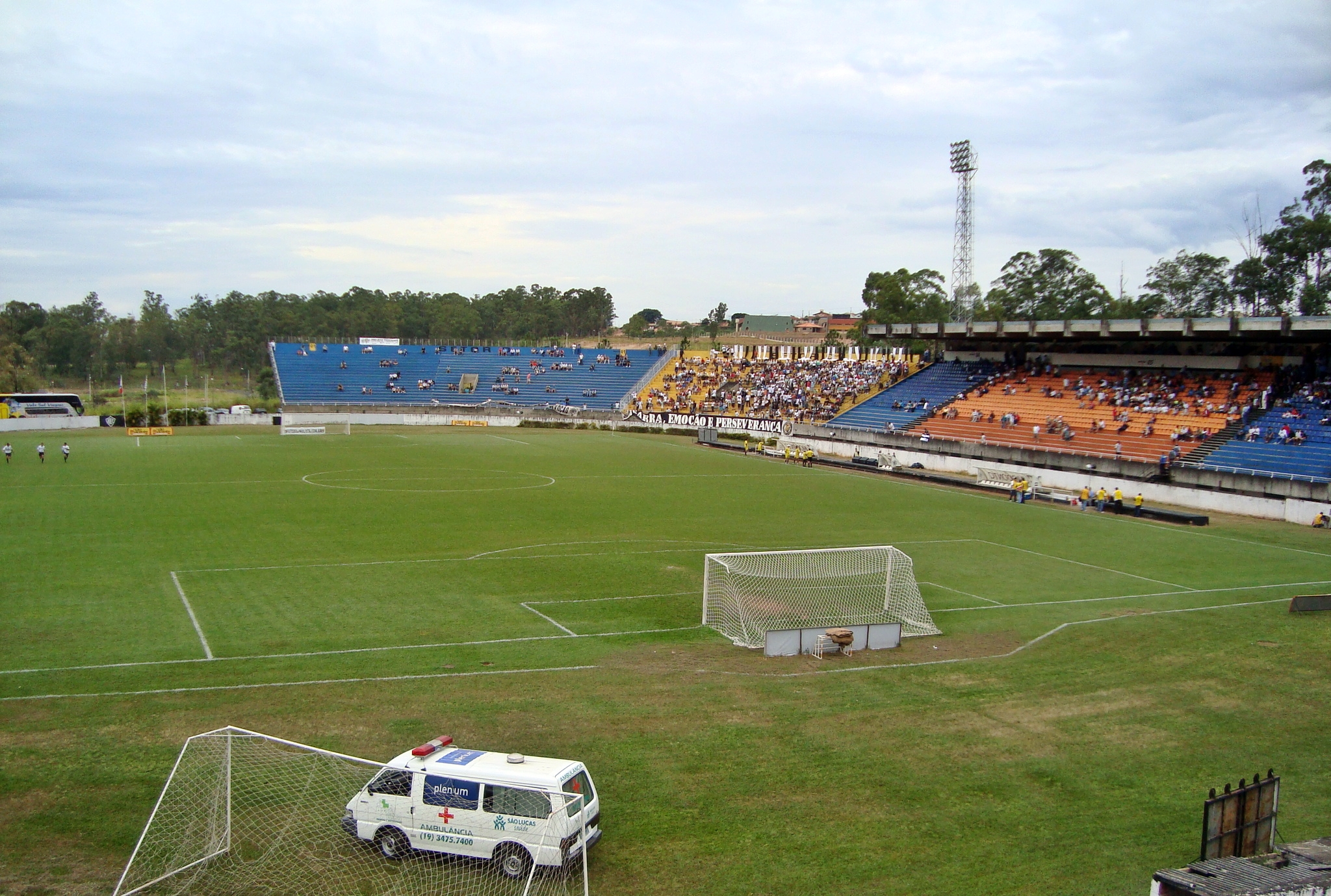
Estádio Municipal Décio Vitta

Guaratinguetá Futebol Ltda., commonly referred to as simply Guaratinguetá, was a Brazilian professional football club based in Guaratinguetá, São Paulo. Due to financial challenges, the activities of the club are terminated and the last time they participated in a professional match was in September 2016.

== History ==
On 1 October 1998, the club was founded as Guaratinguetá Esporte Clube by a group including Doctor Mário Augusto Rodrigues Nunes (nicknamed Marinho).

On 4 November 1999, the Consórcio de Guaratinguetá (Guaratinguetá Consortium) was created, to co-manage the club with C.S.R Futebol e Marketing, owned by the entrepreneur Carlos Arini and by the football players César Sampaio and Rivaldo.

On 26 November 1999, the club joined the São Paulo Football Federation, competing in the Campeonato Paulista Série B2 in the following year.

In 2002, the Consórcio de Guaratinguetá ended, and the club was owned by the entrepreneurs Odário Mardegan Durães and Elmiro Aparecido de Faria.

Since 2004, the club has been owned by the entrepreneur Sony Alberto Douer. In 2005, he and the entrepreneur Carlos Arini founded Sony Sports, a company created to manage the club. Some time later, the entrepreneurs Clementino Bolan and Gustavo Gazzolla joined Sony Sports. The club then received its current name, Guaratinguetá Futebol, after it became a limited company.

In 2006, Guaratinguetá was eliminated in the Campeonato Paulista Série A2 semifinal stage, but was second in its group, and was therefore promoted to the following year's Campeonato Paulista Série A1.

In 2007, the club competed in the Campeonato Paulista Série A1 for the first time. Guaratinguetá was defeated by São Caetano 2–0 at the Anacleto Campanella stadium in its debut in the competition.

On 15 October 2010, the club announced its move from Guaratinguetá to Americana, and their change of name to Americana Futebol.

On 28 November 2011, after more than a year in Americana, the club's administrator, Sony Sports, announced the team's return to Guaratinguetá to compete in the 2012 Campeonato Paulista and other competitions, as Americana city and its main stadium, Estádio Décio Vitta was not able to support the club and the city's club, Rio Branco, and also because most of the supports of the club live in Guaratinguetá.

== Club colors ==
The club colors are red and white. The home kit is all red and the away kit is all white.

== Stadium ==
Guaratinguetá's home stadium was Estádio Municipal Professor Dario Rodrigues Leite, nicknamed Ninho da Garça, meaning Heron's Nest, with a maximum capacity of 15,769 people.

The club also trained at a training ground named Centro de Treinamento Dario Rodrigues Leite.

== Anthem ==
Americana's anthem authors were Cláudio Braga and Marcelo Betti.

== Mascot ==
The club's mascot is a heron. The animal is also depicted in the club's logo.

== Honours ==
- Campeonato Paulista do Interior
  - Winners (1): 2007
