= Grêmio Osasco Audax Esporte Clube =

Football club in Osasco, Brazil

Audax
- Full name: Grêmio Osasco Audax Esporte Clube
- Founded: 9 January 1986; 40 years ago
- Ground: Pref. José Liberatti
- Capacity: 12,430
- President: Renato Dos Santos Botega
- Head Coach: Luciano Quadros
- League: Campeonato Paulista Segunda Divisão
- 2025: Paulista Série A4, 15th of 16 (relegated)
- Website: www.audaxsp.com.br
Home colours	Away colours

Grêmio Osasco Audax Esporte Clube, commonly referred to as Audax, is a professional association football club based in Osasco, São Paulo, Brazil. The team competes in Campeonato Paulista Segunda Divisão, the fifth tier of the São Paulo state football league.

The club was formerly known as Pão de Açúcar Esporte Clube, PAEC and Audax São Paulo Esporte Clube.

== History ==
The club was founded as a city of São Paulo-based club on 8 December 2004 as Pão de Açúcar Esporte Clube, playing their first professional game on 7 April 2007, against Jabaquara, for the Campeonato Paulista Segunda Divisão. They won the Campeonato Paulista Segunda Divisão in 2008, after beating Batatais in the final.

Pão de Açúcar Esporte Clube was renamed to Audax São Paulo Esporte Clube on 17 July 2011, adopting a new logo and new kits. The owner of the club, Grupo Pão de Açúcar, changed the club's name to bring the team closer to its supporters.

The club was sold on September 22, 2013 to Mário Teixeira, president of Bradesco and vice-president of Grêmio Osasco, renamed to Grêmio Osasco Audax and moved to Osasco.

In his little time after having changed from the city, the team controlled by Fernando Diniz surprised to eliminate major clubs, such as the São Paulo and Corinthians in the Campeonato Paulista.

After its campaign in the Paulistão, the club partnered with Oeste to participate in the Campeonato Brasileiro Série B, with Fernando Diniz and several members of the squad involved.

== Honours ==
=== State ===
- Campeonato Paulista
  - Runners-up (1): 2016
- Campeonato Paulista Série A3
  - Winners (1): 2019
- Campeonato Paulista Série A4
  - Winners (1): 2008

=== Women's Football ===
- Copa Libertadores Femenina
  - Winners (1): 2017
- Copa do Brasil de Futebol Feminino
  - Winners (1): 2016

== Stadium ==
Grêmio Audax Osasco plays they home games at Estádio José Liberatti. The stadium has a maximum capacity of 12,430.

Audax São Paulo Esporte Clube, until 2014, played their home games at Estádio Nicolau Alayon. The stadium has a maximum capacity of 9,660 people.

The club, until 2011, played their home games at Estádio Conde Rodolfo Crespi, nicknamed Estádio Rua Javari. The stadium has a maximum capacity of 4,000 people.

== Women's team ==
Their women's team debuted in the 2015 Campeonato Paulista de Futebol Feminino and then for two years put together a combined squad with Corinthians (called Corinthians Audax) and won the 2017 Copa Libertadores Femenina and the 2016 Copa do Brasil de Futebol Feminino.
