= 2017 SE Palmeiras season =

Palmeiras
2017 season
- President: Maurício Galiotte
- Coach: Eduardo Baptista (until May 4); Cuca (May 9 – October 13); Alberto Valentim (interim)
- Stadium: Allianz Parque
- Série A: 2nd
- Campeonato Paulista: Semifinal
- Copa Libertadores: Round of 16
- Copa do Brasil: Quarter-final
- Top goalscorer: League: Dudu (9 goals); All: Willian (17 goals)
- Highest home attendance: 39,091 (vs. Corinthians – July 12)
- Lowest home attendance: 17,778 (vs. Ponte Preta – October 19)
- Average home league attendance: 29,709
| Home colors | Away colors | Third colors |

The 2017 season was the 103rd in SE Palmeiras existence. This season Palmeiras participated in the Campeonato Paulista, Copa Libertadores, Copa do Brasil and the Série A.

== Players ==
=== Squad information ===
Squad at the end of the season. Note: Flags indicate national team as defined under FIFA eligibility rules; some limited exceptions apply. Players may hold more than one non-FIFA nationality.

| No. | Pos. | Nation | Player |
|---|---|---|---|
| 1 | GK | BRA | Fernando Prass (vice-captain) |
| 2 | MF | BRA | Jean |
| 3 | DF | BRA | Edu Dracena |
| 4 | DF | BRA | Juninho |
| 5 | MF | BRA | Arouca |
| 6 | DF | BRA | Egídio |
| 7 | FW | BRA | Dudu (captain) |
| 8 | MF | BRA | Tchê Tchê |
| 9 | FW | COL | Miguel Borja |
| 10 | MF | BRA | Moisés |
| 11 | MF | BRA | Zé Roberto |
| 12 | DF | BRA | Mayke |
| 13 | DF | BRA | Luan |
| 14 | GK | BRA | Jailson |
| 15 | MF | BRA | Michel Bastos |
| 16 | FW | BRA | Deyverson |

| No. | Pos. | Nation | Player |
|---|---|---|---|
| 17 | FW | BRA | Erik |
| 18 | MF | VEN | Alejandro Guerra |
| 19 | MF | BRA | Bruno Henrique |
| 20 | MF | BRA | Raphael Veiga |
| 21 | MF | BRA | Thiago Santos |
| 22 | DF | BRA | Fabiano |
| 23 | FW | BRA | Róger Guedes |
| 25 | DF | BRA | Antônio Carlos |
| 26 | DF | COL | Yerry Mina |
| 27 | FW | BRA | Keno |
| 28 | MF | BRA | Hyoran |
| 29 | FW | BRA | Willian |
| 30 | MF | BRA | Felipe Melo |
| 42 | GK | BRA | Vinicius Silvestre |
| 51 | GK | BRA | Daniel Fuzato |

=== Copa Libertadores squad ===
As of August 7, 2017.

Note: Flags indicate national team as defined under FIFA eligibility rules; some limited exceptions apply. Players may hold more than one non-FIFA nationality.

| No. | Pos. | Nation | Player |
|---|---|---|---|
| 1 | GK | BRA | Fernando Prass (vice-captain) |
| 2 | DF | BRA | Jean |
| 3 | DF | BRA | Edu Dracena |
| 4 | DF | BRA | Juninho |
| 5 | MF | BRA | Arouca |
| 6 | DF | BRA | Egídio |
| 7 | FW | BRA | Dudu (captain) |
| 8 | MF | BRA | Tchê Tchê |
| 9 | DF | BRA | Mayke |
| 10 | MF | BRA | Moisés |
| 11 | MF | BRA | Zé Roberto |
| 12 | FW | COL | Miguel Borja |
| 13 | MF | BRA | Luan |
| 14 | GK | BRA | Jailson |
| 15 | MF | BRA | Michel Bastos |

| No. | Pos. | Nation | Player |
|---|---|---|---|
| 16 | FW | BRA | Deyverson |
| 17 | FW | BRA | Erik |
| 18 | MF | VEN | Alejandro Guerra |
| 19 | MF | BRA | Bruno Henrique |
| 20 | MF | BRA | Raphael Veiga |
| 21 | DF | BRA | Thiago Santos |
| 22 | DF | BRA | Fabiano |
| 23 | FW | BRA | Róger Guedes |
| 24 | GK | BRA | Vinicius Silvestre |
| 25 | DF | BRA | Antônio Carlos |
| 26 | DF | COL | Yerry Mina |
| 27 | FW | BRA | Keno |
| 28 | MF | BRA | Hyoran |
| 29 | FW | BRA | Willian |
| 30 | MF | BRA | Felipe Melo |

=== Transfers ===
==== Transfers in ====
| Pos. | Player | Transferred from | Fee/notes | Date | Source |
|---|---|---|---|---|---|
| FW | (Brazil) Keno | (Brazil) Santa Cruz | Sign | October 18, 2016 | |
| MF | (Brazil) Hyoran | (Brazil) Chapecoense | Sign | November 9, 2016 | |
| MF | (Brazil) Raphael Veiga | (Brazil) Coritiba | Sign | November 11, 2016 | |
| MF | (Venezuela) Alejandro Guerra | (Colombia) Atlético Nacional | Sign | December 27, 2016 | |
| MF | (Brazil) Michel Bastos | (Brazil) São Paulo | Sign | December 31, 2016 | |
| MF | (Brazil) Felipe Melo | (Italy) Internazionale | Sign | January 8, 2017 | |
| DF | (Brazil) Antônio Carlos | (Brazil) Ponte Preta | Loan | January 10, 2017 | |
| FW | (Brazil) Willian | (Brazil) Cruzeiro | Sign | January 11, 2017 | |
| FW | (Colombia) Miguel Borja | (Colombia) Atlético Nacional | Sign | February 9, 2017 | |
| DF | (Brazil) Luan | (Brazil) Vasco | Sign | April 3, 2017 | |
| DF | (Brazil) Mayke | (Brazil) Cruzeiro | Loan | May 13, 2017 | |
| DF | (Brazil) Juninho | (Brazil) Coritiba | Sign | May 16, 2017 | |
| MF | (Brazil) Bruno Henrique | (Italy) Palermo | Sign | June 14, 2017 | |
| FW | (Brazil) Deyverson | (Spain) Levante | Sign | July 11, 2017 | |

==== Transfers out ====
| Pos. | Player | Transferred to | Fee/notes | Date | Source |
|---|---|---|---|---|---|
| DF | (Brazil) Roger Carvalho | (Brazil) Atlético Goianiense | Sign | December 22, 2016 | |
| MF | (Brazil) Gabriel | Later he signed with (Brazil) Corinthians | Contract not renewed | January 5, 2017 | |
| MF | (Brazil) Matheus Sales | (Brazil) Bahia | Loan | January 8, 2017 | |
| MF | (Brazil) Cleiton Xavier | (Brazil) Vitória | Sign | January 10, 2017 | |
| GK | (Brazil) Vagner | (Brazil) Mirassol | Loan | January 11, 2017 | |
| DF | (Brazil) Fabrício | (Brazil) Cruzeiro | Loan return | January 11, 2017 | |
| FW | (Brazil) Leandro Pereira | (Brazil) Sport | Loan | January 11, 2017 | |
| MF | (Argentina) Agustín Allione | (Brazil) Bahia | Loan | January 13, 2017 | |
| DF | (Brazil) João Pedro | (Brazil) Chapecoense | Loan | January 17, 2017 | |
| MF | (Brazil) Rodrigo | (Brazil) Sport | Loan | February 9, 2017 | |
| FW | (Paraguay) Lucas Barrios | (Brazil) Grêmio | Sign | February 22, 2017 | |
| FW | (Brazil) Alecsandro | (Brazil) Coritiba | Sign | May 10, 2017 | |
| FW | (Brazil) Rafael Marques | (Brazil) Cruzeiro | Sign | May 13, 2017 | |
| DF | (Brazil) Vitor Hugo | (Italy) Fiorentina | Sign | May 18, 2017 | |
| MF | (Brazil) Vitinho | (Spain) Barcelona B | Loan | July 11, 2017 | |
| DF | (Brazil) Thiago Martins | (Brazil) Bahia | Loan | September 6, 2017 | |

== Competitions ==
=== Overview ===
| Competition | First match | Last match | Starting round | Final position | Record | | | | | | | |
| Competition | First match | Last match | Starting round | Final position | Pld | W | D | L | GF | GA | GD | Win % |
|---|---|---|---|---|---|---|---|---|---|---|---|---|
| Série A | 14 May 2017 | 3 December 2017 | Matchday 1 | Runners-up | 38 | 19 | 6 | 13 | 61 | 45 | +16 | 50.00 |
| Copa do Brasil | 22 May 2017 | 17 July 2017 | Round of 16 | Quarter-Finals | 4 | 1 | 2 | 1 | 6 | 6 | +0 | 25.00 |
| Campeonato Paulista | 5 February 2017 | 22 April 2017 | Matchday 1 | Semi-Finals | 16 | 11 | 1 | 4 | 30 | 12 | +18 | 68.75 |
| Copa Libertadores | 8 March 2017 | 9 August 2017 | Group stage | Round of 16 | 8 | 5 | 1 | 2 | 14 | 10 | +4 | 62.50 |
| Total | | | | | 66 | 36 | 10 | 20 | 111 | 73 | +38 | 54.55 |

Source: Competitions

=== Friendlies ===
| January 21 | Chapecoense | 2–2 | Palmeiras | Chapecó |
| 16:30 (UTC−2) | Douglas Grolli 14'; Wellington Paulista (yellow card) 44'; Amaral 46' | Report | Raphael Veiga 11'; Róger Guedes (yellow card) 40'; Vitinho 78' | Stadium: Arena Condá; Attendance: 14,988; Referee: Héber Lopes |

| January 29 | Palmeiras | 1–1 | Ponte Preta | São Paulo |
| 17:00 (UTC−2) | Vitinho (yellow card) 72'; Barrios 74' | Report | William Pottker (yellow card) 17'; Wendel (yellow card) 39'; João Vitor (yellow card) 43' (yellow-red card) 53'; Matheus Jesus (yellow card) 57'; Jadson (yellow card) 78'; Ramon 89' (pen.) | Stadium: Allianz Parque; Attendance: 15,878 |

=== Campeonato Paulista ===
==== First stage ====
The draw was held on November 1, 2016. Palmeiras was drawn on Group C.

| Pos | Team | Pld | W | D | L | GF | GA | GD | Pts | Qualification |
|---|---|---|---|---|---|---|---|---|---|---|
| 1 | Palmeiras | 12 | 8 | 1 | 3 | 23 | 8 | +15 | 25 | knockout stage |
| 2 | Novorizontino | 12 | 4 | 3 | 5 | 17 | 21 | −4 | 15 | knockout stage |
| 3 | Santo André | 12 | 3 | 5 | 4 | 15 | 18 | −3 | 14 | |
| 4 | São Bento | 12 | 4 | 1 | 7 | 8 | 12 | −4 | 13 | |

Source: Soccerway

| February 5 1 | Palmeiras | 1–0 | Botafogo-SP | São Paulo |
| 17:00 (UTC−2) | Tchê Tchê (yellow card) 41', (goal) 46' | Report | Matheus Mancini (yellow card) 4'; Samuel Santos (yellow card) 61'; Diego Pituca (yellow card) 71'; Rafael Bastos (yellow card) 76' | Stadium: Allianz Parque; Attendance: 24,947; Referee: Flávio Rodrigues de Souza |

| February 12 2 | Ituano | 1–0 | Palmeiras | Itu |
| 19:30 (UTC−2) | Ronaldo (yellow card) 28'; Guly 51'; Naylhor (yellow card) 63' | Report | Felipe Melo (yellow card) 80' | Stadium: Novelli Júnior; Attendance: 11,962; Referee: Raphael Claus |

| February 16 3 | Palmeiras | 2–0 | São Bernardo | São Paulo |
| 19:30 (UTC−2) | Willian (yellow card) 43'; Dudu 64'; Jean 77' (pen.); Keno (yellow card) 83' | Report | Vinicius Kiss (yellow card) 37'; Geandro (yellow card) 57'; Marcinho (yellow card) 76' | Stadium: Allianz Parque; Attendance: 23,708; Referee: José Cláudio Rocha Filho |

| February 19 4 | Linense | 0–4 | Palmeiras | Lins |
| 17:00 (UTC−3) | Caíque (yellow card) 36'; Zé Antônio (yellow card) 75' | Report | Willian 23'; Raphael Veiga 26'; Michel Bastos 53'; Mina (yellow card) 54'; Barrios (yellow card) 80', (goal) 81' | Stadium: Gilbertão; Attendance: 10,208; Referee: Luiz Flávio de Oliveira |

| February 22 5 | Corinthians | 1–0 | Palmeiras | São Paulo |
| 21:45 (UTC−3) | Gabriel (yellow card) 22' (yellow-red card) 45'; Jô 87'; Moisés (yellow card) 90+3' | Report | Felipe Melo (yellow card) 5'; Raphael Veiga (yellow card) 10'; Jean (yellow card) 59'; Vitor Hugo (yellow card) 82'; Alecsandro (yellow card) 90+2' | Stadium: Arena Corinthians; Attendance: 30,727; Referee: Thiago Duarte Peixoto |

| February 25 6 | Palmeiras | 4–1 | Ferroviária | São Paulo |
| 16:30 (UTC−3) | Keno 13', (yellow card) 53'; Michel Bastos 65'; Thiago Santos (yellow card) 71'; Fernando Prass (yellow card) 75'; Borja 82'; Róger Guedes 85' | Report | Flávio (yellow card) 54'; Fábio Gonçalves (yellow card) 68'; Alan Mineiro 76' (pen.); Léo Veloso (yellow card) 90+2' | Stadium: Allianz Parque; Attendance: 26,201; Referee: Leandro Bizzio Marinho |

| March 3 7 | Red Bull Brasil | 1–3 | Palmeiras | Campinas |
| 21:05 (UTC−3) | Elvis (yellow card) 36'; Bruno Alves (yellow card) 75'; Evandro 87'; Élton (yellow card) 90'; Thallyson (yellow card) 90+2' | Report | Willian 7'; Felipe Melo (yellow card) 44'; Róger Guedes 79'; Borja 90+4' | Stadium: Moisés Lucarelli; Attendance: 10,176; Referee: Vinicius Furlan |

| March 11 8 | Palmeiras | 3–0 | São Paulo | São Paulo |
| 16:00 (UTC−3) | Dudu 45'; Thiago Santos (yellow card) 50'; Tchê Tchê 55', (yellow card) 72'; Vitor Hugo (yellow card) 59'; Guerra 70' | Report | João Schmidt (yellow card) 32'; Cícero (yellow card) 45'; Rodrigo Caio (yellow card) 75' | Stadium: Allianz Parque; Attendance: 36,090; Referee: Marcelo Aparecido Ribeiro de Souza |

| March 19 9 | Santos | 1–2 | Palmeiras | Santos |
| 18:30 (UTC−3) | Ricardo Oliveira 74' | Report | Felipe Melo (yellow card) 17'; Jean (yellow card) 52', (goal) 85'; Willian 87' | Stadium: Vila Belmiro; Attendance: 8,742; Referee: Flávio Rodrigues de Souza |

| March 22 10 | Palmeiras | 2–0 | Mirassol | São Paulo |
| 20:30 (UTC−3) | Rafael Marques 52'; Fabiano (yellow card) 72'; Antônio Carlos (yellow card) 75'; Felipe Melo 87' | Report | Willian (yellow card) 30'; Raul (yellow card) 48' | Stadium: Allianz Parque; Attendance: 21,488; Referee: Rafael Gomes Felix da Silva |

| March 25 11 | Palmeiras | 2–2 | Audax | São Paulo |
| 16:00 (UTC−3) | Róger Guedes (yellow card) 36', (goal) 45+1'; Willian 72'; Tchê Tchê (yellow card) 77'; Vitinho (yellow card) 83'; Thiago Santos (yellow card) 89'; Antônio Carlos (yellow card) 90+2' | Report | Matheuzinho (yellow card) 23'; Betinho 68'; Léo Artur 80', (yellow card) 90+'; Felipe Alves (yellow card) 90' | Stadium: Allianz Parque; Attendance: 27,386; Referee: Marcelo Aparecido Ribeiro de Souza |

| March 29 12 | Ponte Preta | 1–0 | Palmeiras | Campinas |
| 21:45 (UTC−3) | Marllon (yellow card) 19'; Lucca (yellow card) 42'; William Pottker 74' (pen.) | Report | Zé Roberto (yellow card) 15' (yellow-red card) 71'; Erik (yellow card) 31'; Vitor Hugo (yellow card) 40' | Stadium: Moisés Lucarelli; Attendance: 7,442; Referee: Leandro Bizzio Marinho |

==== Knockout stages ====
===== Quarter-final =====
| April 2 First leg | Novorizontino | 1–3 | Palmeiras | Novo Horizonte |
| 19:00 (UTC−3) | Roberto 11', (yellow card) 82'; Éder (yellow card) 42' | Report | Róger Guedes (yellow card) 32' (yellow-red card) 90', (goal) 89'; Dudu 38'; Felipe Melo (yellow card) 44'; Borja (yellow card) 57', (goal) 65' | Stadium: Dr. Jorge Ismael de Biasi; Attendance: 9,229; Referee: Luiz Flávio de Oliveira |

| April 7 Second leg | Palmeiras | 3–0 (6–1 agg.) | Novorizontino | São Paulo |
| 21:00 (UTC−3) | Willian 32'; Borja 68'; Dudu 88' | Report | Éder (yellow card) 30' | Stadium: Pacaembu; Attendance: 29,145; Referee: Flávio Rodrigues de Souza |

===== Semifinal =====
| April 16 First leg | Ponte Preta | 3–0 | Palmeiras | Campinas |
| 16:00 (UTC−3) | William Pottker 1'; Lucca 7'; Jadson (yellow card) 8'; Jeferson (yellow card) 14', (goal) 33'; Fernando Bob (yellow card) 20'; Reynaldo (yellow card) 85' | Report | Thiago Santos (yellow card) 19'; Borja (yellow card) 55'; Mina (yellow card) 86' | Stadium: Moisés Lucarelli; Attendance: 13,706; Referee: Marcelo Aparecido Ribeiro de Souza |

| April 22 Second leg | Palmeiras | 1–0 (1–3 agg.) | Ponte Preta | São Paulo |
| 19:00 (UTC−3) | Felipe Melo (yellow card) 4', (goal) 82'; Dudu (yellow card) 38'; Guerra (yellow card) 81' | Report | Marllon (yellow card) 23'; Fernando Bob (yellow card) 39' | Stadium: Allianz Parque; Attendance: 39,086; Referee: Raphael Claus |

=== Copa Libertadores ===
==== Group stage ====
| Pos | Team | Pld | W | D | L | GF | GA | GD | Pts | Qualification |
|---|---|---|---|---|---|---|---|---|---|---|
| 1 | (Brazil) Palmeiras | 6 | 4 | 1 | 1 | 13 | 9 | +4 | 13 | Round of 16 |
| 2 | (Bolivia) Jorge Wilstermann | 6 | 3 | 0 | 3 | 12 | 10 | +2 | 9 | Round of 16 |
| 3 | (Argentina) Atlético Tucumán | 6 | 2 | 1 | 3 | 8 | 10 | −2 | 7 | Copa Sudamericana |
| 4 | (Uruguay) Peñarol | 6 | 2 | 0 | 4 | 11 | 15 | −4 | 6 | |

Source: CONMEBOL

The draw of the tournament was held on 21 December 2016, 20:00 PYST (UTC−3), at the CONMEBOL Convention Centre in Luque, Paraguay. Palmeiras was drawn on the Group 5.

| March 8 1 | Atlético Tucumán (Argentina) | 1–1 | (Brazil) Palmeiras | Tucumán, Argentina |
| 21:45 (UTC−3) | Zampedri 24'; Bianchi (yellow card) 38'; Di Plácido (yellow card) 45+1' | Report | Vitor Hugo (yellow card) 18' (yellow-red card) 20'; Keno 39'; Thiago Santos (yellow card) 41'; Fernando Prass (yellow card) 79' | Stadium: Estadio Monumental José Fierro; Attendance: 35,000; Referee: Mario Díaz de Vivar (Paraguay) |

| March 15 2 | Palmeiras (Brazil) | 1–0 | (Bolivia) Jorge Wilstermann | São Paulo, Brazil |
| 21:45 (UTC−3) | Mina (yellow card) 58', (goal) 90+5' | Report | Bergese (yellow card) 28'; Cabezas (yellow card) 32'; Thomaz (yellow card) 38'; Alex Silva (yellow card) 58'; Aponte (yellow card) 70'; Olivares (yellow card) 90+6' | Stadium: Allianz Parque; Attendance: 38,419; Referee: Eduardo Gamboa (Chile) |

| April 12 3 | Palmeiras (Brazil) | 3–2 | (Uruguay) Peñarol | São Paulo, Brazil |
| 21:45 (UTC−3) | Willian 46'; Dudu 49', (yellow card) 90+3' (yellow-red card) 90+3'; Felipe Melo (yellow card) 62'; Mina (yellow card) 70'; Fabiano 90+9' | Report | Pereira (yellow card) 4'; Affonso (yellow card) 29'; Arias 31'; Petryk (yellow card) 41'; C. Rodríguez (yellow card) 47'; G. Rodríguez (yellow card) 69', (goal) 74' | Stadium: Allianz Parque; Attendance: 38,483; Referee: Roddy Zambrano (Ecuador) |

| April 26 4 | Peñarol (Uruguay) | 2–3 | (Brazil) Palmeiras | Montevideo, Uruguay |
| 21:45 (UTC−3) | Affonso 12'; Nández (yellow card) 14'; Arias 38'; Alex Silva (yellow card) 50' | Report | Felipe Melo (yellow card) 14'; Borja (yellow card) 22'; Willian 48', 72'; Edu Dracena (yellow card) 60'; Mina 62'; Michel Bastos (yellow card) 80' | Stadium: Estadio Campeón del Siglo; Referee: Enrique Cáceres (Paraguay) |

| May 3 5 | Jorge Wilstermann (Bolivia) | 3–2 | (Brazil) Palmeiras | Cochabamba, Bolivia |
| 21:45 (UTC−3) | Aponte (yellow card) 26'; Morales 35', (yellow card) 47'; Machado 40'; Cardozo 68'; Ortiz (yellow card) 89' | Report | Guerra 45'; Cabezas 72' (o.g.) | Stadium: Estadio Félix Capriles; Referee: Wilson Lamouroux (Colombia) |

| May 24 6 | Palmeiras (Brazil) | 3–1 | (Argentina) Atlético Tucumán | São Paulo, Brazil |
| 21:45 (UTC−3) | Mina 14'; Thiago Santos (yellow card) 43'; Willian 68'; Zé Roberto 90+1' | Report | Evangelista (yellow card) 14'; Rodríguez 56'; Canuto (yellow card) 71'; González (red card) 71'; Aliendro (yellow card) 80' | Stadium: Allianz Parque; Attendance: 37,418; Referee: Wilmar Roldán (Colombia) |

==== Knockout stage ====
===== Round of 16 =====
The draw for this round was held on June 14. As Palmeiras finished first in his group, they hosted the second leg.

| July 5 First leg | Barcelona (Ecuador) | 1–0 | (Brazil) Palmeiras | Guayaquil, Ecuador |
| 21:45 (UTC−3) | Pineida (yellow card) 17'; Valencia (yellow card) 43'; Lanza (yellow card) 70'; Díaz (yellow card) 81'; Álvez 90+1' | Report | Zé Roberto (yellow card) 36'; Juninho (yellow card) 58'; Tchê Tchê (yellow card) 65' | Stadium: Estadio Monumental Isidro Romero Carbo; Referee: Patricio Loustau (Argentina) |

| August 9 Second leg | Palmeiras (Brazil) | 1–0 (1–1 agg.) (4–5 p) | (Ecuador) Barcelona | São Paulo, Brazil |
| 21:45 (UTC−3) | Moisés 50'; Edu Dracena (yellow card) 79'; Thiago Santos (yellow card) 88' | Report | E. Castillo (yellow card) 45+1'; Oyola (yellow card) 71'; Caicedo (yellow card) 88' | Stadium: Allianz Parque; Attendance: 38,310; Referee: Néstor Pitana (Argentina) |
| | Penalties |
| | Guerra (penalty scored); Tchê Tchê (penalty scored); Bruno Henrique (penalty missed); Keno (penalty scored); Moisés (penalty scored); Egídio (penalty missed) | | (penalty scored) Álvez; (penalty scored) Oyola; (penalty scored) S. Castillo; (penalty scored) Caicedo; (penalty missed) Díaz; (penalty scored) Ayoví |

=== Campeonato Brasileiro ===
==== Standings ====
| Pos | Team | Pld | W | D | L | GF | GA | GD | Pts | Qualification or relegation |
|---|---|---|---|---|---|---|---|---|---|---|
| 1 | Corinthians (C) | 38 | 21 | 9 | 8 | 50 | 30 | +20 | 72 | Qualification for Copa Libertadores group stage |
| 2 | Palmeiras | 38 | 19 | 6 | 13 | 61 | 45 | +16 | 63 | Qualification for Copa Libertadores group stage |
| 3 | Santos | 38 | 17 | 12 | 9 | 42 | 32 | +10 | 63 | Qualification for Copa Libertadores group stage |
| 4 | Grêmio | 38 | 18 | 8 | 12 | 55 | 36 | +19 | 62 | Qualification for Copa Libertadores group stage |
| 5 | Cruzeiro | 38 | 15 | 12 | 11 | 47 | 39 | +8 | 57 | Qualification for Copa Libertadores group stage |

Source: CBF
Rules for classification: 1) points; 2) wins; 3) goal difference; 4) goals scored; 5) head-to-head results; 6) least red cards received; 7) least yellow cards received; 8) draw.
(C) Champions

==== Matches ====
| May 14 1 | Palmeiras | 4–0 | Vasco | São Paulo |
| 16:00 (UTC−3) | Jean 6' (pen.); Guerra 40'; Borja 46', 79' (pen.) | Report | Jomar (yellow card) 77'; Douglas (yellow card) 90+1' | Stadium: Allianz Parque; Attendance: 33,425; Referee: Rodolpho Toski Marques (Paraná) |

| May 20 2 | Chapecoense | 1–0 | Palmeiras | Chapecó |
| 19:00 (UTC−3) | Luiz Antônio 72'; Andrei Girotto (yellow card) 78' | Report | Willian (yellow card) 66' | Stadium: Arena Condá; Attendance: 10,323; Referee: André Luiz de Freitas Castro (Goiás) |

| May 27 3 | São Paulo | 2–0 | Palmeiras | São Paulo |
| 19:00 (UTC−3) | Rodrigo Caio (yellow card) 35'; Pratto 62'; Sidão (yellow card) 63'; Thomaz (yellow card) 73'; Luiz Araújo 83' | Report | Mina (yellow card) 43' | Stadium: Morumbi; Attendance: 33,288; Referee: Anderson Daronco (Rio Grande do Sul) |

| June 4 4 | Palmeiras | 0–0 | Atlético Mineiro | São Paulo |
| 16:00 (UTC−3) | Thiago Santos (yellow card) 62'; Michel Bastos (yellow card) 81' | Report | Robinho (yellow card) 43'; Victor (yellow card) 44'; Yago (yellow card) 69'; Alex Silva (yellow card) 88' | Stadium: Allianz Parque; Attendance: 34,240; Referee: Marcelo de Lima Henrique (Rio de Janeiro) |

| June 7 5 | Coritiba | 1–0 | Palmeiras | Curitiba |
| 19:30 (UTC−3) | Rildo (yellow card) 18'; Márcio (yellow card) 40'; William Matheus (yellow card) 45+2'; Matheus Galdezani 51' | Report | Thiago Santos (yellow card) 43'; Felipe Melo (yellow card) 53'; Antônio Carlos (yellow card) 80' | Stadium: Couto Pereira; Attendance: 16,648; Referee: Bráulio da Silva Machado (Santa Catarina) |

| June 10 6 | Palmeiras | 3–1 | Fluminense | São Paulo |
| 16:00 (UTC−3) | Guerra 9'; Felipe Melo (yellow card) 19'; Keno 40'; Zé Roberto (yellow card) 86'; Róger Guedes (yellow card) 89', (goal) 90+3' | Report | Henrique Dourado 18', (yellow card) 19'; Henrique (yellow card) 55' | Stadium: Allianz Parque; Attendance: 33,066; Referee: André Luiz de Freitas Castro (Goiás) |

| June 14 7 | Santos | 1–0 | Palmeiras | Santos |
| 21:45 (UTC−3) | Lucas Lima (yellow card) 40'; Kayke 50' | Report | Juninho (yellow card) 35'; Tchê Tchê (yellow card) 39' | Stadium: Vila Belmiro; Attendance: 10,143; Referee: Wilton Sampaio (Goiás) |

| June 18 8 | Bahia | 2–4 | Palmeiras | Salvador |
| 16:00 (UTC−3) | Vinícius 44'; Régis Souza (yellow card) 44'; João Paulo 84' | Report | Róger Guedes 17' (pen.); Keno (yellow card) 27', (goal) 48'; Willian (yellow card) 54', (goal) 90+2'; Juninho (yellow card) 72'; Mina 82'; Guerra (yellow card) 89' | Stadium: Arena Fonte Nova; Attendance: 33,166; Referee: Rodolpho Toski Marques (Paraná) |

| June 21 9 | Palmeiras | 1–0 | Atlético Goianiense | São Paulo |
| 21:00 (UTC−3) | Mina (yellow card) 30'; Borja 45'; Guerra (yellow card) 84' | Report | Silva (yellow card) 64'; André Castro (yellow card) 69' | Stadium: Allianz Parque; Attendance: 29,014; Referee: Antônio Dib Moraes de Sousa (Piauí) |

| June 25 10 | Ponte Preta | 1–2 | Palmeiras | Campinas |
| 16:00 (UTC−3) | Fernando Bob (yellow card) 16'; Lucca 40', (yellow card) 74'; Rodrigo (yellow card) 61' (red card) 89'; Emerson Sheik (yellow card) 66'; Renato Cajá (yellow card) 82' (yellow-red card) 90+3'; Wendel (yellow card) 87' | Report | Gabriel Furtado (yellow card) 32'; Guerra 38', 45', (yellow card) 77'; Tchê Tchê (red card) 90+3' | Stadium: Moisés Lucarelli; Attendance: 5,523; Referee: Wagner Reway (Mato Grosso) |

| July 1 11 | Palmeiras | 1–0 | Grêmio | São Paulo |
| 16:00 (UTC−3) | Juninho (yellow card) 57'; Machado 77' (o.g.); Borja (yellow card) 84'; Raphael Veiga (yellow card) 87' | Report | Bressan (yellow card) 49' | Stadium: Pacaembu; Attendance: 29,075; Referee: Wagner do Nascimento Magalhães (Rio de Janeiro) |
Note: This match was played at Pacaembu Stadium, São Paulo, instead of the regular stadium Allianz Parque due to an Ariana Grande concert that was held in the stadium.

| July 9 12 | Cruzeiro | 3–1 | Palmeiras | Belo Horizonte |
| 16:00 (UTC−3) | Thiago Neves 31'; Hudson 41'; Ariel (yellow card) 83'; Élber 90+1' | Report | Mayke (yellow card) 34'; Willian 61', (yellow card) 83'; Dudu (yellow card) 85'; Tchê Tchê (yellow card) 90+1' | Stadium: Mineirão; Attendance: 15,129; Referee: Péricles Bassols Pegado Cortez (Pernambuco) |

| July 12 13 | Palmeiras | 0–2 | Corinthians | São Paulo |
| 21:45 (UTC−3) | Thiago Santos (yellow card) 24'; Dudu (yellow card) 27'; Borja (yellow card) 89' | Report | Jádson 22' (pen.), (yellow card) 60'; Rodriguinho (yellow card) 24'; Guilherme Arana 64', (yellow card) 89'; Cássio (yellow card) 82' | Stadium: Allianz Parque; Attendance: 39,091; Referee: Leandro Vuaden (Rio Grande do Sul) |

| July 16 14 | Palmeiras | 4–2 | Vitória | São Paulo |
| 11:00 (UTC−3) | Edu Dracena (yellow card) 32'; Róger Guedes 36' (pen.); Dudu 45', 76'; Mayke 70'; Gabriel Furtado (yellow card) 71' | Report | Uillian Correia 9'; Cleiton Xavier (yellow card) 33'; Wallace (yellow card) 34'; Geferson (yellow card) 69'; David 84' | Stadium: Allianz Parque; Attendance: 36,263; Referee: Bruno Arleu de Araújo (Rio de Janeiro) |

| July 19 15 | Flamengo | 2–2 | Palmeiras | Rio de Janeiro |
| 21:45 (UTC−3) | Pará 7'; Guerrero 43'; Márcio Araújo (yellow card) 66'; Mancuello (yellow card) 86' | Report | Bruno Henrique (yellow card) 21'; Willian 31'; Róger Guedes 42'; Mina (yellow card) 49'; Luan (yellow card) 57'; Borja (yellow card) 57'; Michel Bastos (yellow card) 72'; Tchê Tchê (yellow card) 75'; Jailson (yellow card) 75'; Thiago Santos (yellow card) 79'; Dudu (yellow card) 89' | Stadium: Luso Brasileiro; Attendance: 14,223; Referee: Jailson Macedo Freitas (Bahia) |

| July 23 16 | Sport | 0–2 | Palmeiras | São Lourenço da Mata |
| 16:00 (UTC−3) | André (yellow card) 63'; Rithely (yellow card) 73'; Diego Souza (yellow card) 90+2' | Report | Bruno Henrique 33'; Keno 45+2'; Juninho (yellow card) 62'; Jailson (yellow card) 78'; Raphael Veiga (yellow card) 90' | Stadium: Arena Pernambuco; Attendance: 42,025; Referee: Eduardo Tomaz de Aquino Valadão (Goiás) |

| July 29 17 | Palmeiras | 2–0 | Avaí | São Paulo |
| 19:00 (UTC−3) | Dudu 10'; Deyverson 34', (yellow card) 89' | Report | Juan (yellow card) 45' (yellow-red card) 45'; Joel (yellow card) 74' | Stadium: Allianz Parque; Attendance: 33,633; Referee: Anderson Daronco (Rio Grande do Sul) |

| August 2 18 | Botafogo | 1–2 | Palmeiras | Rio de Janeiro |
| 21:45 (UTC−3) | Rodrigo Lindoso (yellow card) 43'; Igor Rabello (yellow card) 46'; Rodrigo Pimpão 53'; Carli (yellow card) 72'; João Paulo (yellow card) 83'; Valencia (yellow card) 90' | Report | Igor Rabello 45' (o.g.); Egídio (yellow card) 48'; Deyverson 85'; Jailson (yellow card) 90+2' | Stadium: Estádio Olímpico Nilton Santos; Attendance: 7,517; Referee: Rafael Traci (Paraná) |

| August 6 19 | Palmeiras | 0–1 | Atlético Paranaense | São Paulo |
| 16:00 (UTC−3) | Michel Bastos (yellow card) 35' | Report | Thiago Heleno 17'; Guilherme (yellow card) 23'; Paulo André (yellow card) 81'; Fabrício (yellow card) 90+2' | Stadium: Allianz Parque; Attendance: 29,778; Referee: Rodrigo Batista Raposo (Distrito Federal) |

| August 13 20 | Vasco | 1–1 | Palmeiras | Volta Redonda |
| 16:00 (UTC−3) | Nenê (yellow card) 69'; Escobar 87' | Report | Guerra 76'; Raphael Veiga (yellow card) 76'; Jean (yellow card) 86' | Stadium: Raulino de Oliveira; Attendance: 4,306; Referee: Paulo Roberto Alves Júnior (Paraná) |

| August 20 21 | Palmeiras | 0–2 | Chapecoense | São Paulo |
| 19:00 (UTC−3) | Moisés (yellow card) 46' | Report | Reinaldo (yellow card) 34'; Fabrício Bruno 38'; Moisés Ribeiro (yellow card) 45+1'; Douglas Grolli (yellow card) 72'; Roberto (yellow card) 82'; Túlio de Melo 90+4' | Stadium: Allianz Parque; Attendance: 21,261; Referee: Dyorgines José Padovani de Andrade (Espírito Santo) |

| August 27 22 | Palmeiras | 4–2 | São Paulo | São Paulo |
| 16:00 (UTC−3) | Willian 35', 38'; Keno 78'; Bruno Henrique (yellow card) 78'; Hyoran 90+1' | Report | Marcos Guilherme 12'; Hernanes 45+6'; Edimar (yellow card) 54'; Arboleda (yellow card) 63' | Stadium: Allianz Parque; Attendance: 33,537; Referee: Sandro Meira Ricci (Santa Catarina) |

| September 9 23 | Atlético Mineiro | 1–1 | Palmeiras | Belo Horizonte |
| 16:00 (UTC−3) | Fred (yellow card) 7'; Fábio Santos 43' (pen.); Leonardo Silva (yellow card) 55'; Alex Silva (yellow card) 60' | Report | Luan (yellow card) 32' (yellow-red card) 40'; Deyverson 33'; Tchê Tchê (yellow card) 74'; Willian (red card) 77'; Fernando Prass (yellow card) 85' | Stadium: Independência; Attendance: 15,672; Referee: Leandro Vuaden (Rio Grande do Sul) |

| September 18 24 | Palmeiras | 1–0 | Coritiba | São Paulo |
| 20:00 (UTC−3) | Jean 39'; Edu Dracena (yellow card) 58'; Egídio (yellow card) 64'; Mayke (yellow card) 70' | Report | Henrique Almeida (yellow card) 31'; Dodô (yellow card) 50'; Alan Santos (yellow card) 69' | Stadium: Pacaembu; Attendance: 24,391; Referee: Dewson Fernando Freitas da Silva (Pará) |

| September 24 25 | Fluminense | 0–1 | Palmeiras | Rio de Janeiro |
| 16:00 (UTC−3) | Lucas (yellow card) 8'; Nogueira (yellow card) 18' | Report | Edu Dracena (yellow card) 30'; Egídio (yellow card) 40', (goal) 41' | Stadium: Maracanã; Attendance: 11,208; Referee: Anderson Daronco (Rio Grande do Sul) |

| September 30 26 | Palmeiras | 0–1 | Santos | São Paulo |
| 19:00 (UTC−3) | Luan (yellow card) 42'; Fernando Prass (yellow card) 90+' | Report | Matheus Jesus (yellow card) 59'; Jean Mota (yellow card) 68'; Ricardo Oliveira 75'; Zeca (yellow card) 79'; Alison (yellow card) 87'; Bruno Henrique (yellow card) 90+2' | Stadium: Allianz Parque; Attendance: 37,527; Referee: Marcelo Aparecido Ribeiro de Souza (São Paulo) |
Note: Fernando Prass received a yellow card after the end of the match.

| October 12 27 | Palmeiras | 2–2 | Bahia | São Paulo |
| 21:00 (UTC−3) | Willian 1'; Edu Dracena (yellow card) 34'; Bruno Henrique 38' | Report | Mendoza (yellow card) 27'; Edigar Junio 45+1', 88' (pen.); Renê Júnior (yellow card) 66' | Stadium: Pacaembu; Attendance: 24,299; Referee: Rafael Traci (Paraná) |

| October 15 28 | Atlético Goianiense | 1–3 | Palmeiras | Goiânia |
| 17:00 (UTC−2) | William Alves (yellow card) 17' (yellow-red card) 80'; Gilvan (yellow card) 45+2'; Walter 76' (pen.) | Report | Willian 20'; Moisés 43'; Dudu 59', (yellow card) 71' | Stadium: Estádio Olímpico Pedro Ludovico; Attendance: 12,619; Referee: Rodolpho Toski Marques (Paraná) |

| October 19 29 | Palmeiras | 2–0 | Ponte Preta | São Paulo |
| 20:00 (UTC−2) | Keno 27'; Borja 72' | Report | Elton (yellow card) 1'; Marllon (yellow card) 34'; Jeferson (yellow card) 40'; Nino Paraíba (yellow card) 85' | Stadium: Pacaembu; Attendance: 17,778; Referee: Leandro Bizzio Marinho (São Paulo) |

| October 22 30 | Grêmio | 1–3 | Palmeiras | Porto Alegre |
| 17:00 (UTC−2) | Michel (yellow card) 23', (goal) 78'; Luan (yellow card) 80' | Report | Bruno Henrique (yellow card) 44'; Dudu 48', 62'; Moisés 54' | Stadium: Arena do Grêmio; Attendance: 16,238; Referee: Ricardo Marques (Minas Gerais) |

| October 30 31 | Palmeiras | 2–2 | Cruzeiro | São Paulo |
| 20:00 (UTC−2) | Borja 34', 85' | Report | Juninho 5' (o.g.); Romero (yellow card) 28'; Robinho 63', (yellow card) 77' | Stadium: Allianz Parque; Attendance: 37,961; Referee: Héber Lopes (Santa Catarina) |

| November 5 32 | Corinthians | 3–2 | Palmeiras | São Paulo |
| 17:00 (UTC−2) | Romero 27', (yellow card) 30'; Balbuena 29'; Jô 37' (pen.); Gabriel (yellow card) 59'; Fagner (yellow card) 78'; Maycon (yellow card) 80'; Cássio (yellow card) 83'; Jádson (yellow card) 87' | Report | Mina 34'; Edu Dracena (yellow card) 36'; Tchê Tchê (yellow card) 49'; Egídio (yellow card) 54'; Bruno Henrique (yellow card) 57'; Moisés 67'; Deyverson (red card) 90+4'; Dudu (yellow card) 90+5' | Stadium: Arena Corinthians; Attendance: 46,090; Referee: Anderson Daronco (Rio Grande do Sul) |

| November 8 33 | Vitória | 3–1 | Palmeiras | Salvador |
| 21:45 (UTC−2) | Yago 5', 39', (yellow card) 31'; Tréllez 14'; Uillian Correia (yellow card) 42' (yellow-red card) 63'; José Welison (yellow card) 72'; René (yellow card) 83' | Report | Dudu 19'; Mayke (yellow card) 87' | Stadium: Barradão; Attendance: 14,803; Referee: Dewson Fernando Freitas da Silva (Pará) |

| November 12 34 | Palmeiras | 2–0 | Flamengo | São Paulo |
| 17:00 (UTC−2) | Deyverson 13', 35' | Report | Renê (yellow card) 33' | Stadium: Allianz Parque; Attendance: 27,831; Referee: Bráulio da Silva Machado (Santa Catarina) |

| November 16 35 | Palmeiras | 5–1 | Sport | São Paulo |
| 20:00 (UTC−2) | Deyverson 56', 78'; Luan 63'; Dudu 89'; Keno 90+1' | Report | Diego Souza (yellow card) 68', (goal) 82'; Anselmo (yellow card) 72' | Stadium: Allianz Parque; Attendance: 18,744; Referee: Rafael Traci (Paraná) |

| November 20 36 | Avaí | 2–1 | Palmeiras | Florianópolis |
| 20:00 (UTC−2) | Marquinhos 57' (pen.); Lourenço 61'; Wellington Simião (yellow card) 87'; Kozlinski (yellow card) 90+3' | Report | Fernando Prass (yellow card) 56'; Keno 74'; Willian (yellow card) 90+4' | Stadium: Ressacada; Attendance: 11,082; Referee: Ricardo Marques (Minas Gerais) |

| November 27 37 | Palmeiras | 2–0 | Botafogo | São Paulo |
| 20:00 (UTC−2) | Felipe Melo (yellow card) 10'; Moisés (yellow card) 48'; Dudu 54'; Keno 62'; Edu Dracena (yellow card) 80' | Report | Bruno Silva (yellow card) 16'; João Paulo (yellow card) 29'; Gilson (yellow card) 46'; Rodrigo Pimpão (yellow card) 51'; Rodrigo Lindoso (yellow card) 80' | Stadium: Allianz Parque; Attendance: 23,562; Referee: Elmo Alves Resende Cunha (Goiás) |

| December 3 38 | Atlético Paranaense | 3–0 | Palmeiras | Curitiba |
| 17:00 (UTC−2) | Ribamar 5'; Éderson 17' (pen.); Sidcley 33', (yellow card) 45+2'; Santos (yellow card) 44'; Pavez (yellow card) 79' | Report | Luan (yellow card) 16'; Dudu (yellow card) 25'; Thiago Santos (yellow card) 77'; Guerra (yellow card) 80'; Mina (yellow card) 85' | Stadium: Arena da Baixada; Attendance: 12,879; Referee: Cláudio Francisco Lima e Silva (Sergipe) |

==== Results by round ====
| Round | 1 | 2 | 3 | 4 | 5 | 6 | 7 | 8 | 9 | 10 | 11 | 12 | 13 | 14 | 15 | 16 | 17 | 18 | 19 | 20 | 21 | 22 | 23 | 24 | 25 | 26 | 27 | 28 | 29 | 30 | 31 | 32 | 33 | 34 | 35 | 36 | 37 | 38 |
|---|---|---|---|---|---|---|---|---|---|---|---|---|---|---|---|---|---|---|---|---|---|---|---|---|---|---|---|---|---|---|---|---|---|---|---|---|---|---|
| Result | W | L | L | D | L | W | L | W | W | W | W | L | L | W | D | W | W | W | L | D | L | W | D | W | W | L | D | W | W | W | D | L | L | W | W | L | W | L |
| Position | 2 | 8 | 14 | 13 | 16 | 13 | 15 | 13 | 9 | 4 | 4 | 5 | 7 | 5 | 6 | 5 | 5 | 4 | 4 | 4 | 4 | 4 | 4 | 4 | 4 | 4 | 5 | 4 | 3 | 2 | 2 | 4 | 4 | 3 | 3 | 3 | 2 | 2 |

Updated to match(es) played on 3 December 2017. Source: Globo Esporte
W = Win; D = Draw; L = Loss

=== Copa do Brasil ===
As a team that disputed the Copa Libertadores, Palmeiras entered in the round of 16. The draw was held on April 20, 2017.

==== Round of 16 ====
| May 17 First leg | Palmeiras (São Paulo (state)) | 1–0 | (Rio Grande do Sul) Internacional | São Paulo |
| 21:45 (UTC–3) | Léo Ortiz 32' (o.g.); Erik (yellow card) 88' | Report | Gutiérrez (yellow card) 62'; Rodrigo Dourado (yellow card) 73' | Stadium: Allianz Parque; Attendance: 31,463; Referee: Sandro Ricci (Santa Catarina) |

| May 31 Second leg | Internacional (Rio Grande do Sul) | 2–1 (2–2a agg.) | (São Paulo (state)) Palmeiras | Porto Alegre |
| 21:45 (UTC–3) | D'Alessandro 8'; López 55'; Léo Ortiz (yellow card) 67'; Danilo Silva (yellow card) 87' | Report | Edu Dracena (yellow card) 18'; Felipe Melo (yellow card) 56'; Thiago Santos 79'; Erik (yellow card) 80'; Borja (yellow card) 90+4'; Fernando Prass (yellow card) 90+5' | Stadium: Estádio Beira-Rio; Attendance: 34,724; Referee: Ricardo Marques (Minas Gerais) |

==== Quarter-final ====
The draw was held on June 5, 2017.

| June 28 First leg | Palmeiras (São Paulo (state)) | 3–3 | (Minas Gerais) Cruzeiro | São Paulo |
| 21:45 (UTC−3) | Dudu 51', 60'; Thiago Santos (yellow card) 63'; Fernando Prass (yellow card) 64'; Willian 64', (yellow card) 90' | Report | Thiago Neves 6'; Robinho 19'; Alisson 30'; Romero (yellow card) 37'; Rafael Sóbis (yellow card) 62'; Hudson (yellow card) 76'; Ábila (yellow card) 84' | Stadium: Allianz Parque; Attendance: 32,067; Referee: Jailson Macedo Freitas (Bahia) |

| July 26 Second leg | Cruzeiro (Minas Gerais) | 1–1 (a4–4 agg.) | (São Paulo (state)) Palmeiras | Belo Horizonte |
| 21:45 (UTC−3) | Alisson (yellow card) 56'; De Arrascaeta (yellow card) 66'; Diogo Barbosa 84'; Thiago Neves (yellow card) 90+4' | Report | Mina (yellow card) 21'; Egídio (yellow card) 48'; Keno 70'; Edu Dracena (yellow card) 90+3' | Stadium: Mineirão; Attendance: 41,660; Referee: Wilton Sampaio (Goiás) |

== Statistics ==
=== Overall statistics ===
As of December 3

| Games played | 66 (16 Campeonato Paulista, 8 Copa Libertadores, 38 Campeonato Brasileiro Série A, 4 Copa do Brasil) |
| Games won | 36 (11 Campeonato Paulista, 5 Copa Libertadores, 19 Campeonato Brasileiro, 1 Copa do Brasil) |
| Games drawn | 10 (1 Campeonato Paulista, 1 Copa Libertadores, 6 Campeonato Brasileiro, 2 Copa do Brasil) |
| Games lost | 20 (4 Campeonato Paulista, 2 Copa Libertadores, 13 Campeonato Brasileiro, 1 Copa do Brasil) |
| Goals scored | 111 |
| Goals conceded | 73 |
| Goal difference | +38 (+18 Campeonato Paulista, +4 Copa Libertadores, +16 Campeonato Brasileiro, 0 Copa do Brasil) |
| Best result | 4–0 (vs. Linense – February 19, Campeonato Paulista); 4–0 (vs. Vasco – May 14, Campeonato Brasileiro); 5–1 (vs. Sport – November 16, Campeonato Brasileiro) |
| Worst result | 0–3 (vs. Ponte Preta – April 16, Campeonato Paulista); 0–3 (vs. Atlético Paranaense – December 3, Campeonato Brasileiro) |
| Yellow cards | 152 |
| Red cards | 8 |
| Top scorer | Willian (17 goals) |
| Clean sheets | 21 |
| Most clean sheets | Fernando Prass |

=== Goalscorers ===
In italic players who left the team in mid-season.

| Place | Position | Nationality | Number | Name | Campeonato Paulista | Copa Libertadores | Série A | Copa do Brasil | Total |
|---|---|---|---|---|---|---|---|---|---|
| 1 | FW | (Brazil) | 29 | Willian | 5 | 4 | 7 | 1 | 17 |
| 2 | FW | (Brazil) | 7 | Dudu | 4 | 1 | 9 | 2 | 16 |
| 3 | FW | (Brazil) | 27 | Keno | 1 | 1 | 8 | 1 | 11 |
| 4 | FW | (Colombia) | 9 | Miguel Borja | 4 | 0 | 6 | 0 | 10 |
| 5 | FW | (Brazil) | 23 | Róger Guedes | 4 | 0 | 4 | 0 | 8 |
| 6 | MF | (Venezuela) | 18 | Alejandro Guerra | 1 | 1 | 5 | 0 | 7 |
| 6 | FW | (Brazil) | 16 | Deyverson | 0 | 0 | 7 | 0 | 7 |
| 7 | MF | (Brazil) | 2 | Jean | 2 | 0 | 3 | 0 | 5 |
| 7 | DF | (Colombia) | 26 | Yerry Mina | 0 | 3 | 2 | 0 | 5 |
| 8 | MF | (Brazil) | 10 | Moisés | 0 | 1 | 2 | 0 | 3 |
| 9 | MF | (Brazil) | 15 | Michel Bastos | 2 | 0 | 0 | 0 | 2 |
| 9 | MF | (Brazil) | 32 | Tchê Tchê | 2 | 0 | 0 | 0 | 2 |
| 9 | MF | (Brazil) | 30 | Felipe Melo | 2 | 0 | 0 | 0 | 2 |
| 9 | MF | (Brazil) | 19 | Bruno Henrique | 0 | 0 | 2 | 0 | 2 |
| 10 | MF | (Brazil) | 20 | Raphael Veiga | 1 | 0 | 0 | 0 | 1 |
| 10 | DF | (Brazil) | 22 | Fabiano | 0 | 1 | 0 | 0 | 1 |
| 10 | DF | (Brazil) | 11 | Zé Roberto | 0 | 1 | 0 | 0 | 1 |
| 10 | MF | (Brazil) | 21 | Thiago Santos | 0 | 0 | 0 | 1 | 1 |
| 10 | DF | (Brazil) | 12 | Mayke | 0 | 0 | 1 | 0 | 1 |
| 10 | MF | (Brazil) | 28 | Hyoran | 0 | 0 | 1 | 0 | 1 |
| 10 | DF | (Brazil) | 6 | Egídio | 0 | 0 | 1 | 0 | 1 |
| 10 | DF | (Brazil) | 13 | Luan | 0 | 0 | 1 | 0 | 1 |
| 10 | FW | (Brazil) | 19 | Rafael Marques | 1 | 0 | 0 | 0 | 1 |
| 10 | FW | (Paraguay) | 8 | Lucas Barrios | 1 | 0 | 0 | 0 | 1 |
