= 2017 Campeonato Paulista knockout stage =

The knockout stage of the 2017 Campeonato Paulista will begin on 1 April with the quarter-final and will be concluded on 7 May 2017 with the final. A total of eight teams will compete in the knockout stage.

== Round and draw dates ==
All draws held at Federação Paulista de Futebol headquarters in São Paulo, Brazil.

Round	Draw date	First leg	Second leg
Quarter-finals	30 March 2017	1–2 April 2017	7–10 April 2017
Semi-finals	11 April 2017	16 April 2017	22–23 April 2017
Finals	–	30 April 2017	7 May 2017

== Format ==
Each tie is played over two legs, with the team with the best placing in the general table playing the second leg at home. The quarterfinals are played between the winners and runners-up of each group. In the semifinals the best team (first) will face the team with the worst campaign (fourth), while the second will face the team with the third best campaign.

== Qualified teams ==
Group	Winners	Runners-up
A	Corinthians	Botafogo
B	São Paulo	Linense
C	Palmeiras	Novorizontino
D	Santos	Ponte Preta

=== Bracket ===
Quarterfinals
A1	Corinthians	0	1	1
A2	Botafogo	0	0	0
B1	São Paulo	2	5	7
B2	Linense	0	0	0
C1	Palmeiras	3	3	6
C2	Novorizontino	1	0	1
D1	Santos	0	1	1 (4)
D2	Ponte Preta	1	0	1 (5)

Semifinals
A1	Corinthians	2	1	3
B1	São Paulo	0	1	1
C1	Palmeiras	0	1	1
D2	Ponte Preta	3	0	3

Finals
A1	Corinthians	3	1	4
D2	Ponte Preta	0	1	1

== Quarterfinals ==
Team 1	Agg.	Team 2	1st leg	2nd leg
Corinthians	1–0	Botafogo	0–0	1–0
São Paulo	7–0	Linense	2–0	5–0
Palmeiras	6–1	Novorizontino	3–1	3–0
Santos	1–1 (4–5 p)	Ponte Preta	0–1	1–0

=== Quarterfinal A ===
April 1, 2017
18:30 UTC−03:00

Botafogo	0 – 0	Corinthians
	Report

Estádio Santa Cruz, Ribeirão Preto
Attendance: 16,218
Referee: Flavio Rodrigues de Souza

April 9, 2017
16:00 UTC−03:00

Corinthians	1 – 0	Botafogo
Rodriguinho 37'	Report

Arena Corinthians, São Paulo
Attendance: 33,491
Referee: Marcelo Aparecido Ribeiro de Souza

=== Quarterfinal B ===
April 2, 2017
16:00 UTC−03:00

Linense	0 – 2	São Paulo
	Report	49' (o.g.) Diego Felipe; 90+3' Pratto

Estádio do Morumbi, São Paulo
Attendance: 15,480
Referee: Leandro Bizzio Marinho

April 8, 2017
16:00 UTC−03:00

São Paulo	5 - 0	Linense
Gilberto 23'; Thiago Mendes 47'; Thiago Mendes 60'; Thomaz 79'; Gilberto 81'	Report

Estádio do Morumbi, São Paulo
Attendance: 27,230
Referee: Luiz Flavio De Oliveira

=== Quarterfinal C ===
April 2, 2017
19:00 UTC−03:00

Novorizontino	1 – 3	Palmeiras
Roberto 11'	Report	39' Dudu; 66' Borja; 90' Róger Guedes

Estádio Dr. Jorge Ismael de Biasi, Novo Horizonte
Attendance: 9,229
Referee: Luiz Flavio de Oliveira

April 7, 2017
21:00 UTC−03:00

Palmeiras	3 - 0	Novorizontino
Willian 33'; Borja 69'; Dudu 89'	Report

Estádio do Pacaembu, São Paulo
Attendance: 29,145
Referee: Flavio Rodrigues De Souza

=== Quarterfinal D ===
April 1, 2017
16:00 UTC−03:00

Ponte Preta	1 – 0	Santos
William Pottker 21'	Report

Estádio Moisés Lucarelli, Campinas
Attendance: 11,545
Referee: Salim Fende Chavez

April 10, 2017
20:00 UTC−03:00

Santos	1 – 0	Ponte Preta
David Braz 16'	Report
Penalties
Kayke (penalty scored); David Braz (penalty missed); Jean Mota (penalty scored); Copete (penalty scored); Lucas Lima (penalty scored)	4–5	(penalty scored) Ravanelli; (penalty scored) Yago; (penalty scored) Clayson; (penalty scored) Jadson; (penalty scored) William Pottker

Estádio do Pacaembu, São Paulo
Attendance: 37,145
Referee: Rafael Gomes Felix da Silva

== Semifinals ==
Team 1	Agg.	Team 2	1st leg	2nd leg
Palmeiras	1–3	Ponte Preta	0–3	1–0
Corinthians	3–1	São Paulo	2–0	1–1

=== Semifinal 1 ===
April 16, 2017
16:00 UTC−03:00

Ponte Preta	3 – 0	Palmeiras
William Pottker 1'; Lucca 8'; Jeferson 33'	Report

Estádio Moisés Lucarelli, Campinas
Attendance: 13,706
Referee: Marcelo Aparecido Ribeiro de Souza

April 22, 2017
19:00 UTC−03:00

Palmeiras	1 – 0	Ponte Preta
Felipe Melo 83'	Report

Allianz Parque, São Paulo
Attendance: 39,086
Referee: Raphael Claus

=== Semifinal 2 ===
April 16, 2017
19:00 UTC−03:00

São Paulo	0 – 2	Corinthians
	Report	20' Jô; 45+3' Rodriguinho

Estádio do Morumbi, São Paulo
Attendance: 45,366
Referee: Luiz Flavio de Oliveira

April 23, 2017
16:00 UTC−03:00

Corinthians	1 – 1	São Paulo
Jô 45+2'	Report	84' Pratto

Arena Corinthians, São Paulo
Attendance: 43,008
Referee: Flavio Rodrigues de Souza

== Finals ==
Team 1	Agg.	Team 2	1st leg	2nd leg
Corinthians	4–1	Ponte Preta	3–0	1–1

April 30, 2017
16:00 UTC−03:00

Ponte Preta	0 – 3	Corinthians
	Report	14', 80' Rodriguinho; 59' Jádson

Estádio Moisés Lucarelli, Campinas
Attendance: 17,322
Referee: Raphael Claus

May 7, 2017
16:00 UTC−03:00

Corinthians	1 - 1	Ponte Preta
Romero 62'	Report	86' Marllon Borges

Arena Corinthians, São Paulo
Referee: Leandro Bizzio Marinho
