= Limberg Gutiérrez =

Limberg Gutiérrez may refer to:

- Limberg Gutiérrez (footballer, born 1977), Bolivian football attacking midfielder
- Limberg Gutiérrez (footballer, born 1998), Bolivian football midfielder, and son of the footballer born 1977
