= Gilberto (footballer, born 1989) =

Brazilian footballer

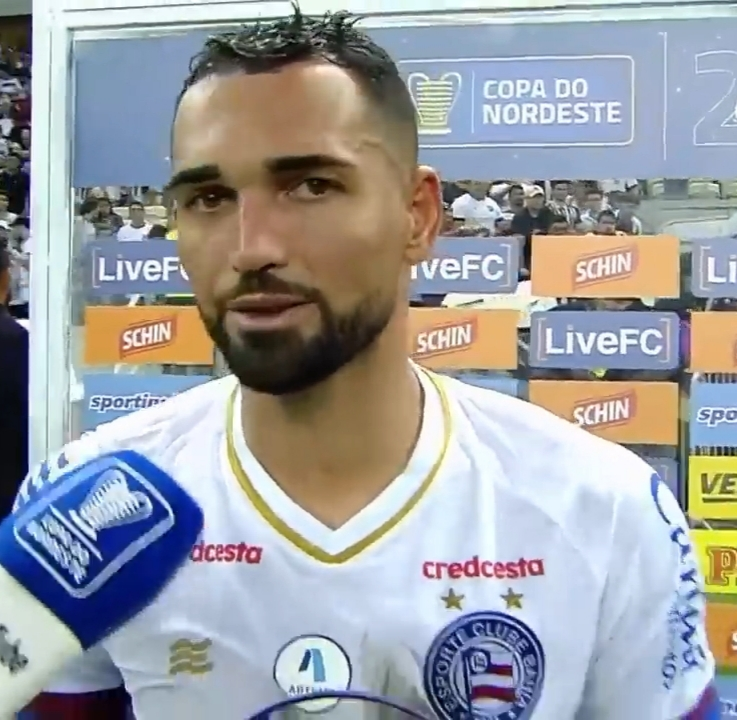
- Gilberto with Bahia in 2020

Personal information
- Full name: Gilberto Oliveira Souza Júnior
- Date of birth: 5 June 1989 (age 37)
- Place of birth: Piranhas, Brazil
- Height: 1.78 m (5 ft 10 in)
- Position: Striker

Team information
- Current team: Londrina
- Number: 9

Youth career
- 2005–2007: Confiança
- 2007–2009: Santa Cruz

Senior career*
Years	Team	Apps	(Gls)
2009–2011	Santa Cruz	26	(12)
2010	→ Vera Cruz (loan)	18	(12)
2011–2014	Internacional	39	(5)
2012	→ Sport Recife (loan)	25	(7)
2013	→ Portuguesa (loan)	24	(14)
2014–2015	Toronto FC	28	(7)
2015	→ Vasco da Gama (loan)	25	(9)
2015–2016	Chicago Fire	19	(5)
2016–2017	São Paulo	36	(13)
2018	Yeni Malatyaspor	12	(2)
2018–2022	Bahia	129	(49)
2022	Al-Wasl	24	(9)
2023	Cruzeiro	28	(6)
2024–2025	Juventude	60	(12)
2026–	Londrina	21	(2)
- * Club domestic league appearances and goals as of 18 November 2026

Gilberto Oliveira Souza Júnior (born 5 June 1989), simply known as Gilberto, is a Brazilian professional footballer who plays as a striker for Londrina.

== Career ==
=== Santa Cruz ===
A Santa Cruz youth graduate, Gilberto made his senior debut on 5 July 2009, coming on as a substitute in a 3–0 Série D away win against CSA. In January 2010, after five first team appearances, he was loaned to Vera Cruz until the end of the year's Campeonato Pernambucano.

After scoring twelve goals in 18 appearances (including four in a 4–1 home routing of Vitória das Tabocas), Gilberto returned to Santa and started to feature more regularly. He became an undisputed starter during the 2011 campaign under Zé Teodoro, scoring twelve goals in the 2011 Pernambucano and being chosen as the best striker in the competition.

=== Internacional ===
In May 2011, Gilberto signed a three-year contract with Internacional in the Série A. He made his debut in the category on 28 May, replacing Mario Bolatti in a 1–0 loss at Ceará.

Gilberto scored his first goal in the main category of Brazilian football on 16 November 2011, netting the game's only in a home defeat of Bahia. On 7 July of the following year, after being sparingly used, he was loaned to Sport Recife until May 2013.

After appearing regularly, Gilberto returned to Inter in January 2013. In July, however, he moved to Portuguesa also in a temporary deal; an immediate starter, he finished the season 14 goals for the club.

=== Toronto FC ===
On 13 December 2013, Gilberto joined Major League Soccer side Toronto FC for a reported transfer fee of over $3 million, choosing MLS after turning down more lucrative offers from Mexico and Germany. He made his debut with Toronto FC against D.C. United on 22 March 2014, the game ended in a 1–0 home victory.

Entering as a substitute against the Columbus Crew on 31 May 2014, Gilberto recorded an assist on Jermain Defoe's 81st-minute equalizer in an eventual 3–2 win to help his team win the Trillium Cup. On 27 June 2014, Gilberto scored his first goal for Toronto FC against the New York Red Bulls, lashing in a 72nd minute free-kick, after arguing with Defoe as to who would take the kick.

==== Vasco da Gama (loan) ====
Due to the arrival of Jozy Altidore, and Sebastian Giovinco in January 2015, both of whom would take up DP slots, after only one season with Toronto, Gilberto was loaned to Brazilian club Vasco da Gama on 20 February 2015. He was the club's top goalscorer during the 2015 Campeonato Carioca with nine goals, but was demoted to a backup option after the arrival of new manager Celso Roth.

=== Chicago Fire ===
Vasco de Gama terminated the loan in July 2015, forcing Toronto to release Gilberto. He was claimed off waivers and acquired as a designated player by Chicago Fire on 27 July 2015.

After scoring five goals in his first season – which included a brace against former club Toronto – Gilberto failed to find the net in his second, and his contract with Chicago Fire was mutually terminated on 29 June 2016.

=== São Paulo ===
On 15 July 2016, Gilberto signed a contract with São Paulo FC until December 2017. A backup to Andrés Chávez, he only featured in eight matches.

On 12 February 2017, Gilberto scored a hat-trick in 5–2 home routing of Ponte Preta, for the year's Campeonato Paulista. He finished the tournament as the top goalscorer with nine goals, along with William Pottker.

=== Yeni Malatyaspor ===
Following a two-year stint with São Paulo, Gilberto joined Süper Lig side Yeni Malatyaspor in Turkey.

=== Bahia ===
On 11 June 2018, Gilberto returned to Brazil, signing a six-month contract with Bahia. He signed an extension until the end of 2021, being the lead scorer for the team. On 19 October 2020, he became the all-time leading scorer in goals in the Campeonato Brasileiro for Bahia. On 5 November 2020, Gilberto scored his 50th goal in 113 matches for Bahia, across all competitions.

=== Al-Wasl ===
On 9 January 2022, Gilberto signed contract free with Al-Wasl.

== Career statistics ==
As of 22 February 2024

Appearances and goals by club, season and competition
Club	Season	League			State League		Cup		Continental		Other		Total	
Club	Season	Division	Apps	Goals	Apps	Goals	Apps	Goals	Apps	Goals	Apps	Goals	Apps	Goals
Santa Cruz	2009	Série D	5	0	—		—		—		—		5	0
Santa Cruz	2010	Série D	4	0	—		0	0	—		14 (Note: Eight appearances, two goals in Copa do Nordeste; six appearances, four goals in Copa Pernambuco)	6	18	6
Santa Cruz	2011	Série C	0	0	17	12	3	1	—		—		20	13
Santa Cruz	Total		9	0	17	12	3	1	—		14	6	43	19
Vera Cruz (loan)	2010	Pernambucano	—		18	12	—		—		—		18	12
Internacional	2011	Série A	13	1	—		—		—		—		13	1
Internacional	2012	Série A	6	1	9	3	—		4 (Note: Appearances in Copa Libertadores)	1	—		19	5
Internacional	2013	Série A	3	0	8	0	0	0	—		—		11	0
Internacional	Total		22	2	17	3	0	0	4	1	—		43	6
Sport Recife (loan)	2012	Série A	25	7	—		—		—		—		25	7
Portuguesa (loan)	2013	Série A	24	14	—		—		—		—		24	14
Toronto FC	2014	Major League Soccer	28	7	—		4 (Note: Appearance(s) in Canadian Championship)	0	—		—		32	7
Vasco da Gama (loan)	2015	Série A	12	0	13	9	1	0	—		—		26	9
Chicago Fire	2015	Major League Soccer	10	5	—		1	0	—		—		11	5
Chicago Fire	2016	Major League Soccer	9	0	—		0	0	—		—		9	0
Chicago Fire	Total		19	5	—		1	0	—		—		20	5
São Paulo	2016	Série A	8	2	—		2	0	—		—		10	2
São Paulo	2017	Série A	17	2	11	9	4	2	1 (Note: Appearance(s) in Copa Sudamericana)	0	—		33	13
São Paulo	Total		25	4	11	9	6	2	1	0	—		43	15
Yeni Malatyaspor	2017–18	Süper Lig	12	2	—		—		—		—		12	2
Bahia	2018	Série A	21	8	—		2	0	2	1	—		25	9
Bahia	2019	Série A	32	14	7	3	9	4	2	0	8 (Note: Appearance(s) in Copa do Nordeste)	8	56	29
Bahia	2020	Série A	33	9	0	0	1	0	8	6	8	4	50	13
Bahia	2021	Série A	36	15	0	0	6	2	4	1	10	8	56	26
Bahia	Total		122	46	7	3	18	6	16	8	26	20	189	83
Al-Wasl	2021–22	UAE Pro League	14	4	—		3	3	—		1 (Note: Appearance(s) in UAE League Cup)	1	18	8
Al-Wasl	2022–23	UAE Pro League	10	5	—		1	1	—		2	1	13	7
Al-Wasl	Total		24	9	—		4	4	—		3	2	31	15
Cruzeiro	2023	Série A	20	3	8	3	4	0	—		—		32	6
Juventude	2024	Série A	0	0	4	2	0	0	—		—		4	2
Career total			342	99	95	53	43	11	21	9	43	28	528	198

== Honours ==
Santa Cruz

- Campeonato Pernambucano: 2011

Internacional

- Campeonato Gaúcho: 2012, 2013

Vasco da Gama

- Campeonato Carioca: 2015

Bahia

- Campeonato Baiano: 2019, 2020

Individual

- Campeonato Paulista top scorer: 2017
- Copa do Nordeste top scorer: 2021
