= 2017 Campeonato Paulista =

Campeonato Paulista - Série A1
- Season: 2017
- Teams: 16
- Champions: Corinthians
- Relegated: São Bernardo; Audax
- Matches: 106
- Goals: 272 (2.57 per match)
- Top goalscorer: Gilberto; William Pottker; 9 goals each
- Biggest home win: Santos 6–2 Linense (3 February)
- Biggest away win: Linense 0–4 Palmeiras (19 February)

The 2017 Campeonato Paulista de Futebol Profissional da Primeira Divisão - Série A1 was the 116th season of São Paulo's top professional football league.

== Format ==
- In the first stage the sixteen teams are drawn, with seeding, into four groups of four teams each, with each team playing once against the twelve clubs from the other three groups. After each team has played twelve matches, the top two teams of each group qualify for the quarter-final stage.
- After the completion of the first stage, the two clubs with the lowest number of points, regardless of the group, will be relegated to the Campeonato Paulista Série A2.
- Quarter-finals, semi-finals and finals are played in a two-legged home and away fixture, with the best placed first stage team playing the second leg at home.
- In case of a draw in any knockout stage, the match will be decided by a penalty shoot-out.

=== Tiebreakers ===
The teams are ranked according to points (3 points for a win, 1 point for a draw, 0 points for a loss). If two or more teams are equal on points on completion of the group matches, the following criteria are applied to determine the rankings:

1. Higher number of wins;
2. Superior goal difference;
3. Higher number of goals scored;
4. Fewest red cards received;
5. Fewest yellow cards received;
6. Draw in the headquarters of the FPF.

== Teams ==
Club	Home city	Manager	2016 result
Audax	Osasco	Fernando Diniz	2nd
Botafogo-SP	Ribeirão Preto	Moacir Júnior	13th
Corinthians	São Paulo (Tatuapé)	Fábio Carille	3rd
Ferroviária	Araraquara	PC Oliveira	14th
Ituano	Itu	Roque Júnior	10th
Linense	Lins	Márcio Fernandes	12th
Mirassol	Mirassol	Moisés Egert	2nd (Série A2)
Novorizontino	Novo Horizonte	Silas Pereira	11th
Palmeiras	São Paulo (Perdizes)	Eduardo Baptista	4th
Ponte Preta	Campinas	Felipe Moreira	9th
Red Bull Brasil	Campinas	Alberto Valentim	7th
Santo André	Santo André	Toninho Cecílio	1st (Série A2)
Santos	Santos	Dorival Júnior	1st
São Bento	Sorocaba	Paulo Roberto Santos	5th
São Bernardo	São Bernardo do Campo	Sérgio Vieira	6th
São Paulo	São Paulo (Morumbi)	Rogério Ceni	8th

Source: Futebol Paulista

== First stage ==
Key to colours in group tables
Group winners and runners-up advance to the quarter-finals
Two bottom teams (independent of group) are relegated

=== Group A ===
Pos	Team	Pld	W	D	L	GF	GA	GD	Pts	Qualification
1	Corinthians	12	7	3	2	14	9	+5	24	knockout stage
2	Botafogo-SP	12	4	5	3	13	10	+3	17	knockout stage
3	Ituano	12	3	5	4	11	12	−1	14	
4	São Bernardo	12	3	1	8	10	17	−7	10	

Source: Soccerway

=== Group B ===
Pos	Team	Pld	W	D	L	GF	GA	GD	Pts	Qualification
1	São Paulo	12	5	5	2	25	20	+5	20	knockout stage
2	Linense	12	5	2	5	16	25	−9	17	knockout stage
3	Red Bull Brasil	12	3	4	5	14	16	−2	13	
4	Ferroviária	12	3	4	5	10	15	−5	13	

Source: Soccerway

=== Group C ===
Pos	Team	Pld	W	D	L	GF	GA	GD	Pts	Qualification
1	Palmeiras	12	8	1	3	23	8	+15	25	knockout stage
2	Novorizontino	12	4	3	5	17	21	−4	15	knockout stage
3	Santo André	12	3	5	4	15	18	−3	14	
4	São Bento	12	4	1	7	8	12	−4	13	

Source: Soccerway

=== Group D ===
Pos	Team	Pld	W	D	L	GF	GA	GD	Pts	Qualification
1	Santos	12	7	1	4	23	13	+10	22	knockout stage
2	Ponte Preta	12	6	4	2	18	16	+2	22	knockout stage
3	Mirassol	12	4	3	5	17	17	0	15	
4	Audax	12	2	3	7	16	21	−5	9	

Source: Soccerway

== Knockout stage ==
=== Bracket ===
Quarterfinals
A1	Corinthians	0	1	1
A2	Botafogo	0	0	0
B1	São Paulo	2	5	7
B2	Linense	0	0	0
C1	Palmeiras	3	3	6
C2	Novorizontino	1	0	1
D1	Santos	0	1	1 (4)
D2	Ponte Preta	1	0	1 (5)

Semifinals
A1	Corinthians	2	1	3
B1	São Paulo	0	1	1
C1	Palmeiras	0	1	1
D2	Ponte Preta	3	0	3

Finals
A1	Corinthians	3	1	4
D2	Ponte Preta	0	1	1

Campeonato Paulista
2017 champion

28th title

== General table ==
Pos	Team	Pld	W	D	L	GF	GA	GD	Pts	Qualification or relegation
1	Corinthians (C)	18	10	6	2	22	11	+11	36	Finals of knockout stage
2	Ponte Preta	18	8	5	5	23	22	+1	29	Finals of knockout stage
3	Palmeiras	16	11	1	4	30	12	+18	34	Eliminated in the semifinals
4	São Paulo	16	7	6	3	33	23	+10	27	Eliminated in the semifinals
5	Santos	14	8	1	5	24	14	+10	25	Eliminated in the quarterfinals
6	Botafogo-SP	14	4	6	4	13	11	+2	18	Eliminated in the quarterfinals
7	Linense (B)	14	5	2	7	16	32	−16	17	Eliminated in the quarterfinals
8	Novorizontino (B)	14	4	3	7	18	27	−9	15	Eliminated in the quarterfinals
9	Mirassol (B)	12	4	3	5	17	17	0	15	
10	Ituano	12	3	5	4	11	12	−1	14	
11	Santo André	12	3	5	4	15	18	−3	14	
12	São Bento	12	4	1	7	8	12	−4	13	
13	Red Bull Brasil	12	3	4	5	14	16	−2	13	
14	Ferroviária	12	3	4	5	10	15	−5	13	
15	São Bernardo (R)	12	3	1	8	10	17	−7	10	Relegation to 2018 Campeonato Paulista Série A2
16	Audax (R)	12	2	3	7	16	21	−5	9	Relegation to 2018 Campeonato Paulista Série A2

Updated to match(es) played on 7 May 2017. Source: Soccerway.com
Rules for classification: 1st points; 2nd wins; 3rd goal difference; 4th goals scored; 5th head-to-head results; 6th least red cards received; 7th least yellow cards received; 8th draw.
(B) Qualification for the Campeonato Brasileiro Série D; (C) Champions; (R) Relegated

== Top scorers ==
As of 24 April 2017

Rank	Player	Club	Goals
1.	(Brazil) Gilberto	São Paulo	9
1.	(Brazil) William Pottker	Ponte Preta	9
2.	(Brazil) Henan	Santo André	7
2.	(Brazil) Lucca	Ponte Preta	7
3.	(Brazil) Jô	Corinthians	6
4.	(Peru) Cueva	São Paulo	5
4.	(Argentina) Pratto	São Paulo	5
4.	(Brazil) Roberto	Novorizontino	5
4.	(Brazil) Willian	Palmeiras	5
4.	(Brazil) Xuxa	Mirassol	5

== Awards ==
=== Team of the year ===
Pos.	Player	Club
GK	(Brazil) Aranha	Ponte Preta
DF	(Brazil) Fagner	Corinthians
DF	(Colombia) Yerry Mina	Palmeiras
DF	(Brazil) Pablo	Corinthians
DF	(Brazil) Guilherme Arana	Corinthians
MF	(Brazil) Felipe Melo	Palmeiras
MF	(Brazil) Fernando Bob	Ponte Preta
MF	(Peru) Christian Cueva	São Paulo
MF	(Brazil) Rodriguinho	Corinthians
FW	(Brazil) Jô	Corinthians
FW	(Brazil) William Pottker	Ponte Preta
MAN	(Brazil) Fábio Carille	Corinthians

Source Globo Esporte
Last updated: 14 May 2017

Player of the Season

The Player of the Year was awarded to William Pottker.

Young Player of the Season

The Young Player of the Year was awarded to Clayson.

Countryside Best Player of the Season

The Countryside Best Player of the Year was awarded to William Pottker.

Top scorer of the Season

The top scorer of the season was Gilberto and William Pottker, who scored nine goals each.
