= Limberg Gutiérrez (footballer, born 1998) =

Bolivian footballer (born 1998)

Limberg Gutiérrez Jr.
Personal information
- Full name: Limberg Gutiérrez Mojica
- Date of birth: 12 June 1998 (age 28)
- Place of birth: Santa Cruz de la Sierra, Bolivia
- Height: 1.76 m (5 ft 9 1/2 in)
- Position: Midfielder

Team information
- Current team: Real Tomayapo
- Number: 21

Youth career
- –2015: La Paz
- 2015–2018: Nacional

Senior career*
Years	Team	Apps	(Gls)
2018	Bolívar	1	(0)
2019	Guabirá	5	(0)
2020–2022	Real Potosí	15	(1)
2022	The Strongest	0	(0)
2023–2024	Santa Cruz	28	(5)
2024–2025	Blooming	10	(0)
2025	→ Juazeirense (loan)	5	(0)
2025–	Real Tomayapo	1	(0)

International career^{‡}
2015	Bolivia U17	3	(0)
2015–2017	Bolivia U20	7	(0)
2017	Bolivia	1	(0)
- * Club domestic league appearances and goals as of 30 December 2025 ‡ National team caps and goals as of 19:11, 10 May 2021 (UTC)

Limberg Gutiérrez Mojica (born 12 June 1998), is a Bolivian international footballer who plays as a midfielder for Real Tomayapo. He is the son of former Bolivian international footballer Limberg Gutiérrez.

== International career ==
Gutiérrez Jr. made his international debut in a 1–0 away loss to Colombia in 2018 FIFA World Cup qualification, replacing Juan Aponte after 90 minutes.

== Career statistics ==
=== Club ===
As of 10 May 2021.

Club	Season	League			Cup		Continental		Other		Total	
Club	Season	Division	Apps	Goals	Apps	Goals	Apps	Goals	Apps	Goals	Apps	Goals
Club Bolívar	2018	Bolivian Primera División	1	0	0	0	0	0	0	0	1	0
Guabirá	2019	Bolivian Primera División	5	0	0	0	–		0	0	5	0
Real Potosí	2021	Bolivian Primera División	1	0	0	0	–		0	0	1	0
Career total			7	0	0	0	0	0	0	0	7	0

=== International ===
As of matches played 15 June 2017.

National team	Year	Apps	Goals
Bolivia	2017	1	0
Total		1	0
