= Éder (footballer, born 1988) =

Brazilian footballer (born 1988)

Personal information
- Full name: Edson Correia de Araujo
- Date of birth: 10 June 1988 (age 38)
- Place of birth: Maceió (city)/ Alagoas, (AL), Brazil
- Height: 1.71 m (5 ft 7 in)
- Position: Defensive midfielder

Team information
- Current team: São Bento

Youth career
- CRB

Senior career*
Years	Team	Apps	(Gls)
2009–2010	CRB	6	(0)
2012	Santacruzense	14	(0)
2012	Arapongas	5	(0)
2013	Rio Claro	17	(1)
2014–2015	São Bento	26	(4)
2015	Paraná	21	(0)
2016	São Bento	14	(2)
2016	Spartak Trnava	5	(1)
2017	Grêmio Novorizontino	9	(0)
2017	Red Bull Brasil	4	(0)
2017–2018	São Bento	6	(2)
2018–2020	Red Bull Brasil		
- * Club domestic league appearances and goals as of 21 August 2017

Edson Correia de Araujo, better known as Éder (born 10 June 1988), was a Brazilian footballer who played as a defensive midfielder.

== Club career ==
=== Spartak Trnava ===
In June 2016, Éder transferred to Slovak club Spartak Trnava, signing a two-year contract. He made his debut for Spartak Trnava in a 1–1 draw against Armenian side Shirak SC in the second round of the 2016–17 UEFA Europa League qualifiers. He made his professional Fortuna Liga debut against DAC Dunajská Streda on 24 July 2016. He was praised for his performance in the 2–1 win, scoring in the 18th minute to level the game at 1–1. Due to injuries, his playing time at Spartak would be limited, resulting in the termination of his contract with the club in October 2016. Éder played a total of eight matches for Spartak Trnava, five in the league, two in the Europa League qualifiers and one in the Slovak Cup.
