= Márcio (footballer, born 1993) =

Brazilian footballer

Personal information
- Full name: Márcio Marcelo Leite Júnior
- Date of birth: 14 January 1993 (age 33)
- Place of birth: Porto Feliz, Brazil
- Height: 1.88 m (6 ft 2 in)
- Position: Centre back

Team information
- Current team: São Bento

Youth career
- Palmeirinha

Senior career*
Years	Team	Apps	(Gls)
2012–2014	Pirassununguense		
2015–2019	Atibaia	40	(1)
2016	→ Confiança (loan)	2	(0)
2017	→ Coritiba (loan)	26	(1)
2018	→ Paraná (loan)	3	(0)
2018	→ CRB (loan)	2	(0)
2019	→ Boa Esporte (loan)	2	(0)
2020	Penapolense		
2020	Pouso Alegre FC		
2020	São Bento	5	(0)
2021–	Rio Branco	1	(0)
- * Club domestic league appearances and goals as of 2 November 2021

Márcio Marcelo Leite Júnior (born 14 January 1993), simply known as Márcio, is a Brazilian professional footballer who plays as a central defender for São Bento.
