= Jeferson (footballer, born 1996) =

Brazilian footballer

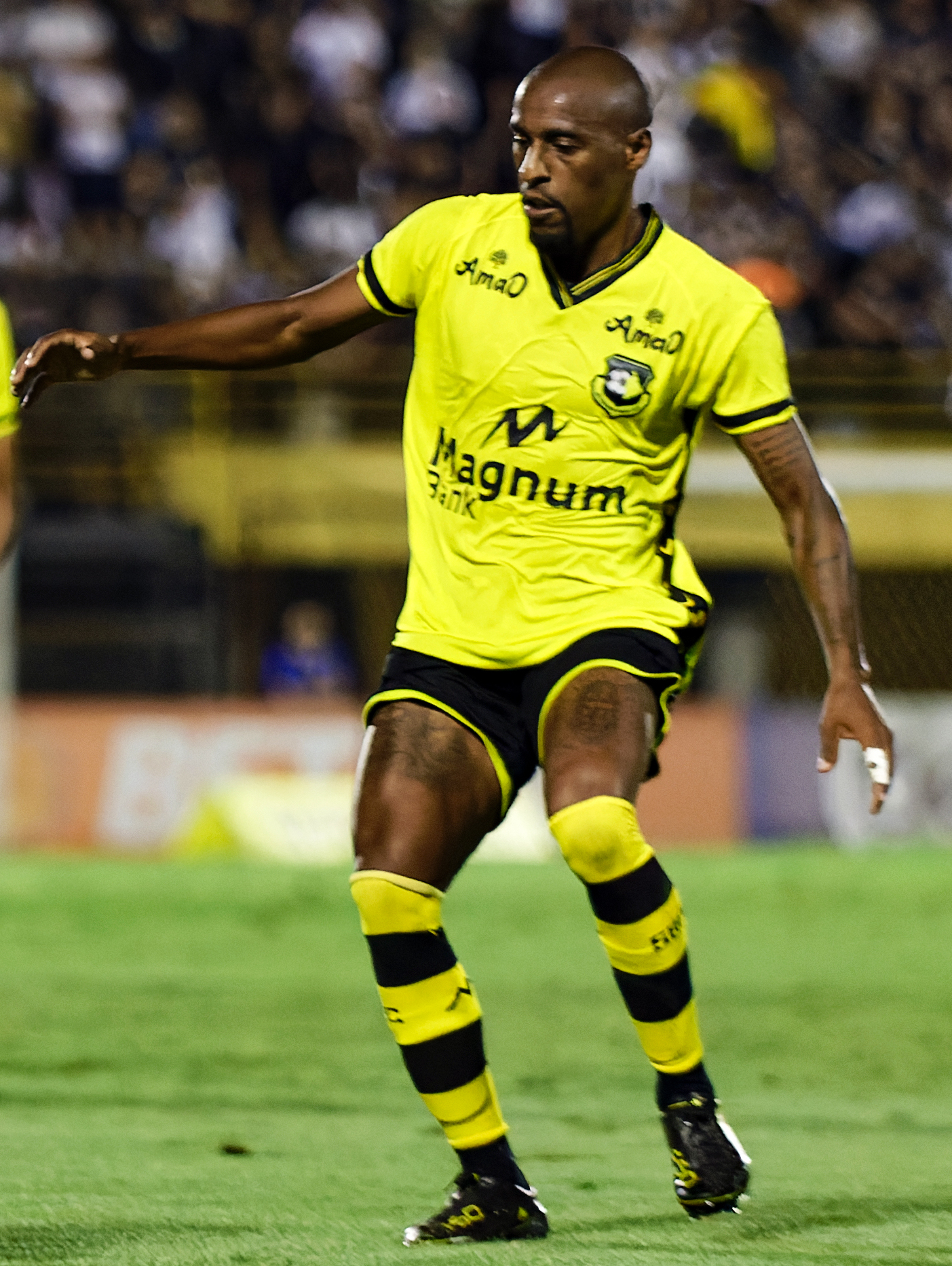
- Jeferson with São Bernardo in 2023

Personal information
- Full name: Jeferson de Araújo de Carvalho
- Date of birth: 22 June 1996 (age 30)
- Place of birth: Campinas, Brazil
- Height: 1.70 m (5 ft 7 in)
- Position: Right back

Team information
- Current team: Brusque
- Number: 2

Youth career
- Ponte Preta

Senior career*
Years	Team	Apps	(Gls)
2013–2021	Ponte Preta	123	(2)
2018–2019	→ Vitória (loan)	44	(1)
2019	→ Vila Nova (loan)	27	(2)
2020	→ Botafogo-SP (loan)	26	(4)
2021	→ Ituano (loan)	10	(0)
2021	→ Mirassol (loan)	14	(0)
2021	→ Sport Recife (loan)	0	(0)
2021	→ Náutico (loan)	3	(0)
2022	Santo André	10	(0)
2022	Ferroviária	11	(0)
2022	→ Londrina (loan)	16	(0)
2023–2024	São Bernardo	32	(1)
2025–2026	Botafogo-SP	34	(0)
2026–	Brusque	14	(1)

International career^{‡}
2013	Brazil U17	5	(0)
- * Club domestic league appearances and goals as of 9 November 2026 ‡ National team caps and goals as of 4 January 2017

Jeferson de Araújo de Carvalho (born 22 June 1996), known as Jeferson Carvalho, or only Jeferson, is a Brazilian footballer who plays as a right back for Brusque.

== Career ==
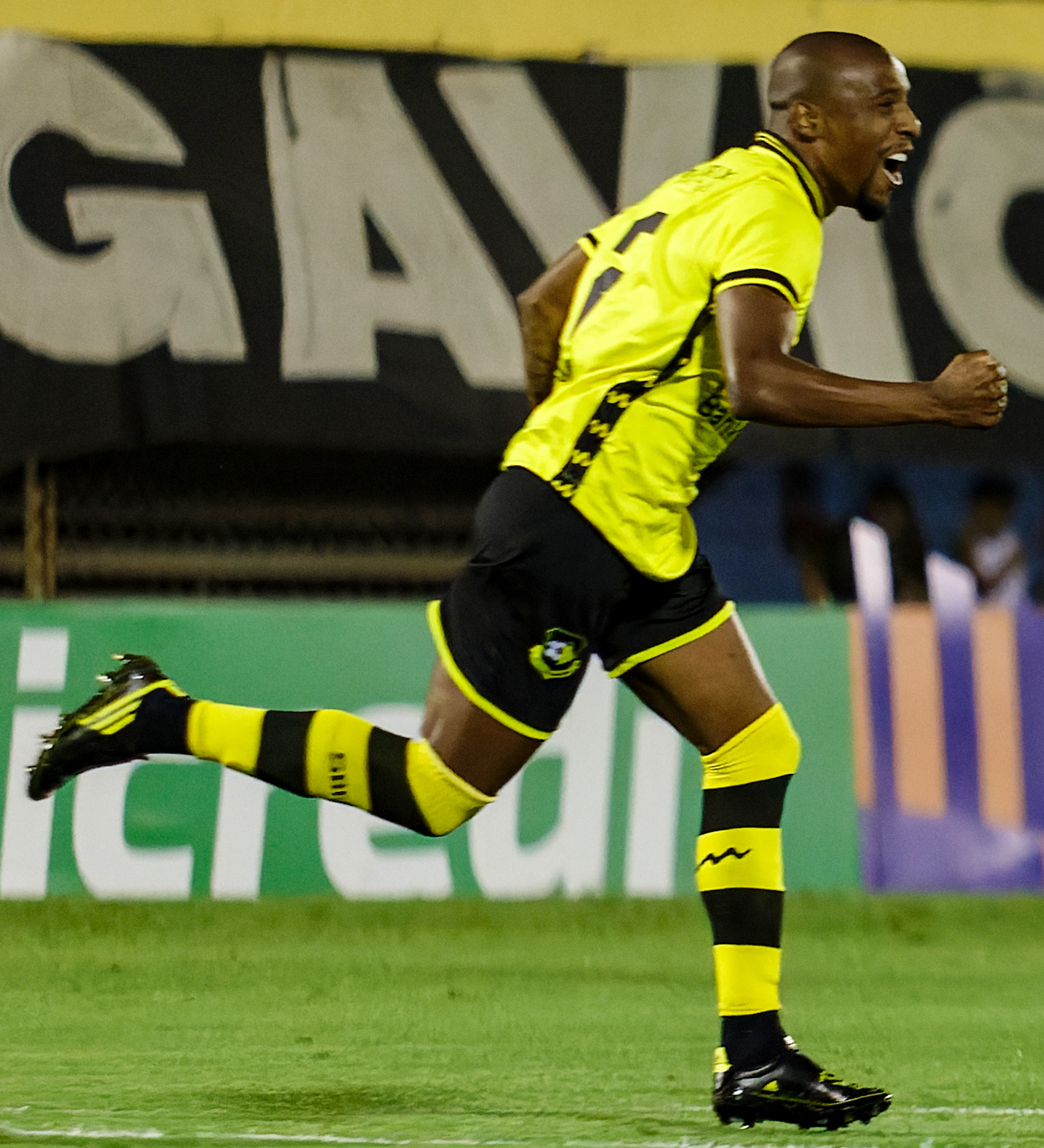
Jeferson with São Bernardo in 2023

=== Ponte Preta ===
Born in Campinas, Jeferson graduated with Ponte Preta's youth setup. On 7 September 2011 he made his first team debut, coming on as a second-half substitute in a 0–1 away loss against Nacional for Copa do Brasil.

Jeferson made his Série A debut on 15 October 2015, starting in a 1–0 away success over Palmeiras. His first goal in the category came on 16 June 2016, in a 3–2 home success over Atlético Paranaense.

In April 2019, he joined Vila Nova on loan.

== International career ==
Jeferson was called up for Brazil under-17s ahead of the South American championship and World Cup.

== Career statistics ==
As of 4 January 2017

Club	Season	League			State League		Cup		Conmebol		Other		Total	
Club	Season	Division	Apps	Goals	Apps	Goals	Apps	Goals	Apps	Goals	Apps	Goals	Apps	Goals
Ponte Preta	2013	Série A	0	0	0	0	1	0	—		—		1	0
Ponte Preta	2014	Série B	2	0	0	0	0	0	—		—		2	0
Ponte Preta	2015	Série A	3	0	3	0	5	0	2	0	—		13	0
Ponte Preta	2016	Série A	20	1	12	0	5	0	—		—		37	1
Career total			25	1	15	0	11	0	2	0	0	0	53	1
