= Juan Aponte =

Bolivian footballer (born 1992)

Personal information
- Full name: Juan Pablo Aponte Gutierrez
- Date of birth: 18 May 1992 (age 34)
- Place of birth: Portachuelo, Bolivia
- Position: Full-back

Youth career
- 2011–2012: Nacional Potosi

Senior career*
Years	Team	Apps	(Gls)
2013-2014	Nacional Potosi	25	(1)
2014-2020	Wilstermann	178	(1)
2021	Oriente Petrolero	20	(2)
2022	The Strongest	18	(0)
2023	Wilstermann	16	(0)

International career
2018	Bolivia	1	(0)
- * Club domestic league appearances and goals as of 00:15, 1 January 2025 (UTC)

Juan Pablo Aponte Gutierrez (born 18 May 1992) is a Bolivian former professional footballer who played the majority of his career for C.D. Jorge Wilstermann in the Bolivian Primera División, and played for the Bolivia national football team.

== Club career ==
A left-back, Aponte played at Nacional Potosí between 2011 and 2014. He played for C.D. Jorge Wilstermann in the Bolivian Primera División between 2014 and 2020, winning three league titles in 2016, 2018 and 2019. His appearances included playing for the club in the 2017 Copa Libertadores as they reached the quarter-finals.

In January 2021, Aponte signed for Oriente Petrolero on a one-year contract. He signed for The Strongest for the 2022 season. He returned to Wilstermann in March 2023.

== International career ==
On March 23, 2017, he started a 2018 FIFA World Cup away qualification game for the Bolivia national football team against Colombia.

== Personal life ==
Aponte is from Portachuelo in Santa Cruz de la Sierra.

== Controversy ==
In April 2020, while a player at C.D. Jorge Wilstermann, Aponte was placed under house arrest in his hometown of Portachuelo after being charged with endangering public health and dangerous driving after being found to be driving intoxicated and violating the local quarantine rules during the COVID-19 pandemic. Wilstermann's president, Grover Vargas, when speaking to the media after the incident said he would not be dismissed by the club due to his previous impeccable behaviour and remorsefulness.
