= Roberto César (footballer, born 1985) =

Brazilian footballer

Roberto
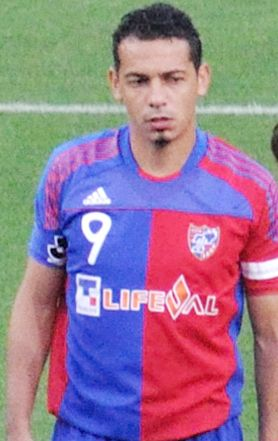

Personal information
- Full name: Roberto César Zardin Rodrigues
- Date of birth: 19 December 1985 (age 40)
- Place of birth: Sapiranga, Brazil
- Height: 1.78 m (5 ft 10 in)
- Position: Forward

Team information
- Current team: Vitória

Senior career*
Years	Team	Apps	(Gls)
2003–2004	Figueirense		
2004	Albirex Niigata	1	(0)
2005	Atlético Ibirama		
2005–2006	Figueirense		
2007–2009	Cabofriense		
2007	→ Macaé (loan)		
2008	→ Tigres do Brasil (loan)		
2009–2010	Avaí	38	(8)
2011–2013	FC Tokyo	29	(10)
2012	→ Coritiba (loan)	17	(1)
2013	→ Ulsan Hyundai (loan)	18	(1)
2014–2016	Avaí	47	(5)
2016	Novorizontino	12	(3)
2016–2017	Criciúma	31	(5)
2017	Novorizontino	12	(5)
2017–2018	Ceará	40	(8)
2018	Ponte Preta	17	(1)
2019–2020	Oeste	60	(4)
2020–2021	Juventude	27	(1)
2021	Figueirense	15	(2)
2021	Londrina	13	(2)
2022	Vitória	23	(1)
- * Club domestic league appearances and goals as of 24 September 2022

Roberto César Zardin Rodrigues, better known as Roberto (born 19 December 1985), is a Brazilian footballer.

== Club career ==
Roberto went through a few clubs in Brazil and Niigata in Japan, until he transferred to Avai on April 30, 2009. At the beginning of the 2010 season, he was close to a transfer to Coritiba through an exchange by the athlete Marcos Aurélio, but the deal did not go ahead and Roberto stayed in Avaí.

== Honours ==
Avaí

- Campeonato Catarinense: 2010

FC Tokyo

- J2 League: 2011

Coritiba

- Campeonato Paranaense: 2012
