= William Pottker =

Brazilian footballer

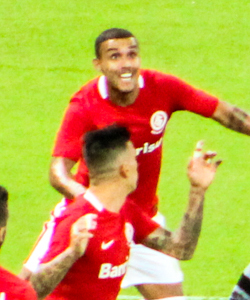
- Pottker with Internacional in 2017

Personal information
- Full name: William de Oliveira Pottker
- Date of birth: 22 February 1993 (age 33)
- Place of birth: Florianópolis, Brazil
- Height: 1.80 m (5 ft 11 in)
- Position: Forward

Team information
- Current team: Londrina
- Number: 23

Youth career
- Figueirense

Senior career*
Years	Team	Apps	(Gls)
2011–2016	Figueirense	12	(0)
2013	→ Gandzasar (loan)	11	(3)
2013	→ Ventforet Kofu (loan)	1	(1)
2014	→ Red Bull Brasil (loan)	9	(0)
2015	→ Linense (loan)	13	(5)
2015–2016	→ Braga B (loan)	10	(1)
2016	→ Linense (loan)	13	(7)
2016–2017	Ponte Preta	51	(24)
2017–2020	Internacional	108	(26)
2020–2023	Cruzeiro	25	(6)
2021–2022	→ Al-Wasl (loan)	11	(1)
2022	→ Avaí (loan)	27	(3)
2023	→ Coritiba (loan)	4	(0)
2023–2025	Avaí	35	(2)
2025	Atlético Goianiense	17	(3)
2025–2026	CRB	25	(0)
2026	Ponte Preta	12	(2)
2026–	Londrina	13	(2)
- * Club domestic league appearances and goals as of 18 November 2026

William de Oliveira Pottker (born 22 February 1993) is a Brazilian professional footballer who plays as a forward for Londrina.

== Career ==
Born in Florianópolis, Pottker graduated with Figueirense's youth setup. On 7 September 2011 he made his first team – and Série A – debut, coming on as a second-half substitute in a 1–1 away draw against Atlético Goianiense.

Pottker was subsequently loaned to Gandzasar, Ventforet Kofu, Red Bull Brasil and Linense, scoring five goals with the latter in 2015 Campeonato Paulista. On 16 May 2015, he was loaned to S.C. Braga in a season-long deal, with a buyout clause.

After only appearing for Braga's B-team in Segunda Liga, Pottker returned to Brazil and played for Linense, on loan, until the end of 2016 Campeonato Paulista. On 5 May 2016, after scoring seven goals, he signed a three-year contract with Ponte Preta.

Pottker finished the tournament with a career-best 14 goals (being also the top scorer among Fred and Diego Souza), being a key unit as his side finished eighth; highlights included a brace in a 3–0 away win over Santa Cruz on 30 June 2016. He also topped the charts in the 2017 Campeonato Paulista with nine goals, as Ponte finished second.

On 16 February 2017, Pottker was sold to Internacional, but remained at Ponte until the end of the year's Paulistão.

On 18 July 2017, he made his debut for Internacional, against Luverdense, scoring the only goal of the game in the 93rd minute.

== Career statistics ==
As of 12 November 2019

Appearances and goals by club, season and competition
Club	Season	League			Cup		Continental		Other		Total	
Club	Season	Division	Apps	Goals	Apps	Goals	Apps	Goals	Apps	Goals	Apps	Goals
Figueirense	2011	Série A	1	0	—		—		—		1	0
Figueirense	2012	Série A	6	0	—		—		3	0	9	0
Figueirense	2014	Série A	1	0	—		—		—		1	0
Figueirense	2015	Série A	—		1	0	—		—		1	0
Figueirense	Total		8	0	1	0	0	0	3	0	12	0
Gandzasar (loan)	2012–13	Armenian Premier League	7	2	4	1	—		—		11	3
Red Bull Brasil (loan)	2014	Paulista A2	—		—		—		9	0	9	0
Linense (loan)	2015	Paulista	—		—		—		13	5	13	5
Braga B (loan)	2015–16	LigaPro	10	1	—		—		—		10	1
Linense (loan)	2016	Série D	0	0	1	0	—		12	7	13	7
Ponte Preta	2016	Série A	31	14	—		—		—		31	14
Ponte Preta	2017	Série A	0	0	2	1	1	0	17	9	20	10
Ponte Preta	Total		31	14	2	1	1	0	17	9	51	24
Internacional	2017	Série B	32	10	—		—		—		32	10
Internacional	2018	Série A	30	5	3	1	—		6	4	39	9
Internacional	2019	Série A	8	4	0	0	4	0	7	1	10	5
Internacional	Total		70	19	3	1	4	0	13	5	81	24
Career total			126	36	11	3	5	0	67	26	200	64

== Honours ==
Individual

- Campeonato Brasileiro Série A Top Goalscorer: 2016
- Campeonato Paulista Player of the year: 2017
- Campeonato Paulista Countryside player of the year: 2017
- Campeonato Paulista Team of the year: 2017
- Campeonato Paulista top scorer: 2017
